= 2011 Shirak FC season =

Shirak
2011 season
- Chairman: Arman Sahakyan
- Manager: Samvel Petrosyan
- Stadium: Gyumri City Stadium
- Premier League: 7th
- Armenian Cup: Runners-up
- Armenian Cup: Progressed to 2012–13 season
- Top goalscorer: League: Andranik Barikyan (10); All: Andranik Barikyan (13)

The 2011 season was Shirak's 21st consecutive season in the Armenian Premier League and covers the period from 1 January 2011 to 31 December 2011.

== Squad ==
As of match played 24 November 2011

No.	Name	Nationality	Position	Date of birth (age)	Signed from	Signed in	Contract ends	Apps.	Goals
Goalkeepers
1	Gela Dzamunashvili	(Georgia (country))	GK	15 August 1981 (aged 30)	Meskheti Akhaltsikhe	2010		9	0
16	Ihar Logvinaw	(Belarus)	GK	23 August 1983 (aged 28)	Belshina Bobruisk	2011		34	0
	Norayr Abrahamyan	(Armenia)	GK	30 October 1985 (aged 26)	Academy	2009			
Defenders
2	Davit Mkrtchyan	(Armenia)	DF	30 June 1989 (aged 22)					
3	Armen Ghazaryan	(Armenia)	DF	30 January 1988 (aged 23)	Youth team				
4	Hovhannes Tahmazyan	(Armenia)	DF	11 January 1970 (aged 41)	Mika	2007			
13	Rafael Paltajyan	(Armenia)	DF	2 February 1984 (aged 27)	Youth team	2004			
17	Garnik Sargsyan	(Armenia)	DF	11 March 1983 (aged 28)	Youth team	2001			
21	Gevorg Hovhannisyan	(Armenia)	DF	16 June 1983 (aged 28)	Youth team	2003			
25	Aghvan Davoyan	(Armenia)	DF	21 March 1990 (aged 21)	Youth team	2010			
28	Haykaz Gevorgyan	(Armenia)	DF	27 May 1993 (aged 19)	Youth team				
Midfielders
6	Armen Tigranyan	(Armenia)	MF	27 November 1985 (aged 25)	Ulisses	2011		26	0
7	Karen G.Khachatryan	(Armenia)	MF	8 May 1981 (aged 30)	Youth team	1999			
8	Tigran Davtyan	(Armenia)	MF	10 June 1978 (aged 33)	Ulisses	2009			
10	Davit Hakobyan	(Armenia)	MF	21 March 1993 (aged 18)	Youth team	2010			
11	Hrachya Mnatsakanyan	(Armenia)	MF	16 December 1985 (aged 25)	Youth team	2006			
12	Andranik Barikyan	(Armenia)	MF	11 September 1980 (aged 31)	Youth team	1998			
14	Ararat Harutyunyan	(Armenia)	MF	24 August 1975 (aged 36)	Ulisses	2007			
15	Karen Aleksanyan	(Armenia)	MF	17 June 1980 (aged 31)	Ulisses	2011		32	1
18	Ara Mkrtchyan	(Armenia)	MF	3 November 1984 (aged 27)	Youth team	2005			
20	Karen Muradyan	(Armenia)	MF	1 November 1992 (aged 19)	Youth team	2011		10	0
22	Arman Aslanyan	(Armenia)	MF	30 January 1994 (aged 17)	Youth team	2011		0	0
23	Arsen Hovhannisyan	(Armenia)	MF	12 May 1989 (aged 22)	Ararat Yerevan	2009			
26	Hayk Galstyan	(Armenia)	MF	23 March 1998 (aged 13)	Youth team	2011		1	0
29	Arman Margaryan	(Armenia)	MF	8 March 1989 (aged 22)					
30	Artur Davtyan	(Armenia)	MF	13 May 1990 (aged 21)	Youth team	2010			
33	Artur Gasparyan	(Armenia)	MF	17 May 1994 (aged 17)	Youth team	2011		0	0
Forwards
5	Yoro Lamine Ly	(Senegal)	FW	27 August 1988 (aged 23)	loan from ASC Niarry Tally	2011		12	2
9	Mkrtich Nalbandyan	(Armenia)	FW	5 February 1989 (aged 22)	Youth team	2006			
27	Aram Tosunyan	(Armenia)	FW	29 May 1993 (aged 18)	Youth team	2011		5	0
Players out on loan
Players who left during the season
2	Hovhannes Grigoryan	(Armenia)	DF	9 March 1985 (aged 26)	Gandzasar Kapan	2011		13	1
5	Artak Grigoryan	(Armenia)	DF	24 April 1979 (aged 32)	Ararat Yerevan	2009			
14	Karen Stepanyan	(Armenia)	DF	1 December 1985 (aged 25)	Gandzasar Kapan	2011		6	0
19	Tiago Lopez	(Brazil)	MF	1 December 1985 (aged 25)	Shabab Al-Ordon	2010			
22	Karen N.Khachatryan	(Armenia)	FW	10 June 1985 (aged 26)	Kilikia	2011		19	3
23	Benjamin Kabongo	(Armenia)	FW	27 January 1987 (aged 24)	URS Centre	2011		3	0
26	Artak Oseyan	(Armenia)	MF	16 May 1987 (aged 24)					

== Transfers ==
=== In ===
Date	Position	Nationality	Name	From	Fee	Ref.
1 January 2011	DF	(Armenia)	Hovhannes Grigoryan	Gandzasar Kapan	Undisclosed	
1 January 2011	DF	(Armenia)	Karen Stepanyan	Gandzasar Kapan	Undisclosed	
1 January 2011	MF	(Armenia)	Karen Aleksanyan	Ulisses	Undisclosed	
1 January 2011	MF	(Armenia)	Armen Tigranyan	Ulisses	Undisclosed	
1 January 2011	FW	(Armenia)	Karen N.Khachatryan	Kilikia	Undisclosed	
1 January 2011	FW	(Belgium)	Benjamin Kabongo	URS Centre	Undisclosed	
8 February 2011	GK	(Belarus)	Ihar Logvinaw	Belshina Bobruisk	Undisclosed	

=== Loan in ===
Start date	Position	Nationality	Name	From	End date	Ref.
Summer 2011	FW	(Senegal)	Yoro Lamine Ly	ASC Niarry Tally	End of Season	

=== Out ===
Date	Position	Nationality	Name	From	Fee	Ref.
1 July 2011	DF	(Armenia)	Hovhannes Grigoryan	Mika	Undisclosed	
18 July 2011	FW	(Armenia)	Karen N.Khachatryan	Ararat Yerevan	Undisclosed	

=== Released ===
Date	Position	Nationality	Name	Joined	Date
30 June 2011	DF	(Armenia)	Karen Stepanyan	King Delux	
30 June 2011	DF	(Brazil)	Tiago Lopez	Muaither	
30 June 2011	FW	(Belgium)	Benjamin Kabongo	KSK Maldegem	
31 December 2011	GK	(Belarus)	Ihar Logvinaw	Minsk	
31 December 2011	GK	(Georgia (country))	Gela Dzamunashvili	Meskheti Akhaltsikhe	
31 December 2011	DF	(Armenia)	Davit Mkrtchyan		
31 December 2011	DF	(Armenia)	Hovhannes Tahmazyan	Retired	
31 December 2011	MF	(Armenia)	Hayk Galstyan	Mika	
31 December 2011	MF	(Armenia)	Arsen Hovhannisyan	Ararat Yerevan	
31 December 2011	MF	(Armenia)	Karen G.Khachatryan	Retired	
31 December 2011	MF	(Armenia)	Arman Margaryan	Retired	
31 December 2011	MF	(Armenia)	Hrachya Mnatsakanyan	Retired	
31 December 2011	MF	(Armenia)	Garnik Sargsyan	Retired	

== Competitions ==
=== Premier League ===
==== Results summary ====
Overall								Home						Away					
Pld	W	D	L	GF	GA	GD	Pts	W	D	L	GF	GA	GD	W	D	L	GF	GA	GD
28	6	7	15	27	42	−15	25	5	4	5	15	16	−1	1	3	10	12	26	−14

Last updated: 5 November 2011.
Source: See Results

==== Results ====
5 March 2011 1	Mika	0 – 0	Shirak	Yerevan
15:00 (UTC+4)	Mkrtchyan (yellow card) 19'; A.Petrosyan (yellow card) 24'	Report	Hovhannisyan (red card) 23'; A.Barikyan (yellow card) 40'	Stadium: Mika Stadium; Attendance: 1,500; Referee: Arman Amirkhanyan

20 March 2011 2	Shirak	2 – 1	Impuls	Ijevan
15:00 (UTC+4)	Hovhannisyan 22'; Tahmazyan (yellow card) 30'; H.Grigoryan (yellow card) 34'; A.Barikyan 85'; Tiago Lopez (yellow card) 87'	Report	Elton Luis (yellow card) 30'; G.Tibilashvili 45'; M.Simonyan (yellow card) 84'	Stadium: Arnar Stadium; Attendance: 1,100; Referee: Arman Amirkhanyan

2 April 2011 3	Gandzasar Kapan	1 – 0	Shirak	Kapan
16:00 (UTC+4)	Kocharyan 10'; V.Marshavela (yellow card) 14'; Obradović (yellow card) 86'	Report	Logvinaw (yellow card) 9'; A.Barikyan (yellow card) 24'; Tigranyan (yellow card) 38'; H.Grigoryan (yellow card) 67'; M.Nalbandyan (yellow card) 86'	Stadium: Gandzasar Stadium; Attendance: 1,000; Referee: Gevorg Eghoyan

10 April 2011 4	Shirak	1 – 3	Ulisses	Ijevan
16:00 (UTC+4)	H.Mnatsakanyan (yellow card) 26'; K.N.Khachatryan 42'	Report	Krasovski 29', 36'; Aleksanyan 59' (yellow card) 59'	Stadium: Arnar Stadium; Attendance: 150; Referee: Gevorg Eghoyan

17 April 2011 5	Pyunik	1 – 0	Shirak	Yerevan
16:00 (UTC+4)	Manucharyan 17'; Ga.Poghosyan (red card) 88'; Yedigaryan (yellow card) 90'	Report	Tiago Lopez (yellow card) 4'	Stadium: Vazgen Sargsyan Republican Stadium; Attendance: 400; Referee: Gevorg Eghoyan

23 April 2011 6	Banants	2 – 2	Shirak	Yerevan
16:00 (UTC+4)	Poghosyan 18'; Correa 51' (yellow card) 90'; Daghbashyan (yellow card) 77'	Report	Aleksanyan (yellow card) 42'; A.Barikyan (yellow card) 51' (goal) 78' (pen.); K.N.Khachatryan 75'	Stadium: Vazgen Sargsyan Republican Stadium; Attendance: 400; Referee: Andranik Arsenyan

30 April 2011 7	Shirak	1 – 1	Ararat Yerevan	Ijevan
17:00 (UTC+4)	A.Barikyan 24'	Report	Hakobyan 46'	Stadium: Arnar Stadium; Attendance: 200; Referee: Gevorg Eghoyan

7 May 2011 8	Shirak	1 – 0	Mika	Ijevan
17:00 (UTC+4)	M.Nalbandyan 62'; Tigranyan (yellow card) 71'	Report	Ishkhanyan (red card) 66'; G.Poghosyan (yellow card) 86'	Stadium: Arnar Stadium; Attendance: 300; Referee: Gevorg Eghoyan

15 May 2011 9	Impuls	2 – 1	Shirak	Abovyan
18:00 (UTC+4)	Goharyan 39', 58'; N.Davtyan (yellow card) 79'	Report	M.Nalbandyan 64'	Stadium: Abovyan City Stadium; Attendance: 600; Referee: Suren Baliyan

22 May 2011 10	Shirak	0 – 2	Gandzasar Kapan	Ijevan
18:00 (UTC+4)	Hovhannisyan (yellow card) 35'; M.Nalbandyan (yellow card) 72'	Report	Matić 15'; Kocharyan 37'; A.Hambardzumyan (yellow card) 45'; V.Marshavela (yellow card) 57'	Stadium: Arnar Stadium; Attendance: 300; Referee: Manuk Fahradyan

29 May 2011 11	Ulisses	1 – 0	Shirak	Yerevan
18:00 (UTC+4)	A.Bareghamyan 70'	Report	A.Oseyan (yellow card) 79'	Stadium: Hrazdan Stadium; Attendance: 300; Referee: Gevorg Eghoyan

11 June 2011 12	Shirak	2 – 0	Pyunik	Ijevan
19:00 (UTC+4)	A.Ghazaryan (yellow card) 14'; K.G.Khachatryan (yellow card) 28'; A.Barikyan 30'; Hovhannisyan 72' (yellow card) 87'	Report		Stadium: Arnar Stadium; Attendance: 200; Referee: Gevorg Eghoyan

18 June 2011 13	Shirak	1 – 1	Banants	Ijevan
19:00 (UTC+4)	K.N.Khachatryan 66'	Report	Balabekyan 75'	Stadium: Arnar Stadium; Attendance: 150; Referee: Zaven Hovhannisyan

26 June 2011 14	Ararat Yerevan	2 – 1	Shirak	Yerevan
19:00 (UTC+4)	K.Veranyan 14' (pen.); Ara.Hovhannisyan 46'; G.Fon Acran (yellow card) 85'	Report	A.Barikyan (yellow card) 42'; K.G.Khachatryan 90'	Stadium: Hrazdan Stadium; Attendance: 200; Referee: Manuk Fahradyan

24 July 2011 15	Mika	4 – 1	Shirak	Yerevan
19:00 (UTC+4)	Beglaryan 27'; S.Muradyan 54'; A.Azatyan 82' (yellow card) 82'; Ednei 90'	Report	M.Nalbandyan 63'	Stadium: Mika Stadium; Attendance: 500; Referee: Arman Amirkhanyan

30 July 2011 16	Shirak	2 – 3	Impuls	Ijevan
19:00 (UTC+4)	A.Barikyan 36'; Aleksanyan (yellow card) 62' (goal) 90'; H.Gevorgyan (yellow card) 72'	Report	A.Barseghyan 41'; Gyozalyan 45'; S.Hakobyan 82' (yellow card) 82'	Stadium: Arnar Stadium; Attendance: 250; Referee: Manuk Fahradyan

6 August 2011 17	Gandzasar Kapan	4 – 0	Shirak	Kapan
18:00 (UTC+4)	Obradović 20'; Gustavo Correia 27'; Matić 81'; Avetisyan 90'	Report		Stadium: Gandzasar Stadium; Attendance: 2,500; Referee: Zaven Hovhannisyan

13 August 2011 18	Shirak	0 – 2	Ulisses	Ijevan
18:00 (UTC+4)	A.Ghazaryan (yellow card) 43' (red card) 49'; G.Sargsyan (red card) 45'	Report	A.Grigoryan 29' (yellow card) 60'; D.Grigoryan (yellow card) 53'; A.Tadevosyan 87'	Stadium: Arnar Stadium; Attendance: 150; Referee: Manuk Fahradyan

21 August 2011 19	Pyunik	1 – 0	Shirak	Yerevan
19:00 (UTC+4)	Yedigaryan 78'	Report	A.Mkrtchyan (yellow card) 67'; A.Barikyan (yellow card) 74'	Stadium: Vazgen Sargsyan Republican Stadium; Attendance: 300; Referee: Suren Baliyan

27 August 2011 20	Banants	3 – 1	Shirak	Yerevan
18:00 (UTC+4)	Hambardzumyan 12' (yellow card) 32'; Beto 24' (pen.); Balabekyan (yellow card) 39'; Correa 45'; G.Khachatryan (yellow card) 78'	Report	Hakobyan 20'; A.Mkrtchyan (yellow card) 23'; Tigranyan (yellow card) 30'; A.Davtyan (yellow card) 59'	Stadium: Banants-1; Attendance: 500; Referee: Gevorg Eghoyan

10 September 2011 21	Shirak	1 – 0	Ararat Yerevan	Ijevan
17:00 (UTC+4)	H.Mnatsakanyan (yellow card) 45'; R.Paltajyan (yellow card) 51'; Ly 85'	Report	K.Avoyan (yellow card) 28'; R.Safaryan (yellow card) 65'	Stadium: Arnar Stadium; Attendance: 250; Referee: Manuk Fahradyan

17 September 2011 22	Shirak	1 – 1	Mika	Ijevan
17:00 (UTC+4)	Ly 14' (pen.) (yellow card) 54'; T.Davtyan (yellow card) 18'; A.Barikyan (yellow card) 82'	Report	Kasparov (yellow card) 13'; H.Grigoryan (yellow card) 16'; Fangzhuo 19' (pen.); Mkrtchyan (yellow card) 57'; Tadevosyan (yellow card) 89'	Stadium: Arnar Stadium; Attendance: 500; Referee: Manuk Fahradyan

25 September 2011 23	Impuls	2 – 1	Shirak	Ijevan
17:00 (UTC+4)	Shilla 30'; Badoyan 88'	Report	Aleksanyan (yellow card) 25'; Hakobyan 27'; R.Paltajyan (yellow card) 55'; Davtyan (yellow card) 90+2'	Stadium: Arnar Stadium; Attendance: 150; Referee: Zaven Hovhannisyan

2 October 2011 24	Shirak	3 – 0	Gandzasar Kapan	Ijevan
16:00 (UTC+4)		Report	N.Grigoryan (yellow card) 90+4'	Stadium: Arnar Stadium; Attendance: 150; Referee: Zaven Hovhannisyan
Note: Match awarded as a 3-0 technical victory to Shirak.

16 October 2011 25	Ulisses	2 – 2	Shirak	Yerevan
15:00 (UTC+4)	D.Grigoryan (yellow card) 36'; Krasovski 66', 79'	Report	A.Barikyan 64', 71'	Stadium: Hrazdan Stadium; Attendance: 300; Referee: Andranik Arsenyan

22 October 2011 26	Shirak	0 – 0	Pyunik	Ijevan
15:00 (UTC+4)	A.Mkrtchyan (yellow card) 72'	Report		Stadium: Arnar Stadium; Attendance: 200; Referee: Zaven Hovhannisyan

29 October 2011 27	Shirak	0 – 2	Banants	Ijevan
15:00 (UTC+4)	Hovhannisyan (yellow card) 29'	Report	Correa 10'; Beto 82'	Stadium: Arnar Stadium; Attendance: 100; Referee: Gevorg Eghoyan

5 November 2011 28	Ararat Yerevan	1 – 3	Shirak	Yerevan
14:00 (UTC+4)	V.Karapetyan (yellow card) 60'; Karapetyan 83'	Report	A.Barikyan 13' (pen.), 50', 88'; H.Mnatsakanyan (yellow card) 21'; Hovhannisyan (yellow card) 84'	Stadium: Hrazdan Stadium; Attendance: 80; Referee: Manuk Fahradyan

==== Table ====
Pos	Team	Pld	W	D	L	GF	GA	GD	Pts	Qualification
4	Banants	28	12	8	8	42	30	+12	44	
5	Mika	28	12	8	8	36	25	+11	44	
6	Impulse	28	10	7	11	37	36	+1	37	
7	Shirak	28	6	7	15	27	42	−15	25	Qualification for the Europa League first qualifying round (Note: Winners of 2011–12 Armenian Cup qualified for the first qualifying round of the UEFA Europa League.)
8	Ararat Yerevan	28	2	4	22	14	57	−43	10	

Rules for classification: 1) points; 2) goal difference; 3) number of goals scored.

=== Armenian Cup ===
==== 2011 ====
10 March 2011 Quarterfinal 1st leg	Shirak	1 – 1	Pyunik	Ijevan
15:00 (UTC+4)	A.Barikyan 34'; Tigranyan (yellow card) 54' (yellow-red card) 59'	Report	S.Hovsepyan 87'	Stadium: Arnar Stadium; Referee: Manuk Fahradyan

14 March 2011 Quarterfinal 2nd leg	Pyunik	0 – 1 (1 – 2 agg.)	Shirak	Yerevan
15:00 (UTC+4)	Yedigaryan (yellow card) 70'	Report	Hovhannisyan (yellow card) 19'; A.Barikyan (yellow card) 24'; Tiago Lopes 37'; K.N.Khachatryan (yellow card) 77'; Aleksanyan (yellow card) 89'; Logvinaw (yellow card) 90+3'	Stadium: Alashkert Stadium; Referee: Suren Baliyan

6 April 2011 Semifinal 1st leg	Shirak	0 – 1	Ulisses	Ijevan
15:00 (UTC+4)	Aleksanyan (yellow card) 75'	Report	A.Adamyan (yellow card) 22'; G.Nranyan 90+3'	Stadium: Arnar Stadium; Referee: Andranik Arsenyan

27 April 2011 Semifinal 2nd leg	Ulisses	0 – 2 (a.e.t.) (1 – 2 agg.)	Shirak	Yerevan
15:00 (UTC+4)	Krasovski (yellow card) 22' (yellow-red card) 119'; L.Akobia (red card) 34'; M.Manasyan (yellow card) 119'	Report	H.Grigoryan 30'; A.Barikyan (yellow card) 34'; T.Davtyan (yellow card) 78'; M.Nalbandyan 99' (yellow card) 99'; A.Mkrtchyan (yellow card) 108'; Hovhannisyan (yellow card) 112'	Stadium: Hrazdan Stadium; Referee: Suren Baliyan

===== Final =====
11 May 2011	Shirak	1 – 4	Mika	Yerevan
19:00 (UTC+4)	A.Barikyan 42' (yellow card) 64'	Report	Alex 16'; G.Poghosyan (yellow card) 32'; Beglaryan 35', 68'; Fangzhuo 90+1'	Stadium: Vazgen Sargsyan Republican Stadium; Referee: David Fernández

==== 2011–12 ====
20 November 2011 Quarterfinal 1st leg	Shirak	2 – 1	Banants	Ijevan
14:00 (UTC+4)	Hovhannisyan 56'; Tigranyan (yellow card) 67'; A.Barikyan 88'	Report	Yedigaryan (yellow card) 55'; Karapetyan 58' (yellow card) 73'	Stadium: Arnar Stadium; Referee: Zaven Hovhannisyan
Note: Match played at the Arnar Stadium in Ijevan instead of Shirak's regular City Stadium in Gyumri.

24 November 2011 Quarterfinal 2nd leg	Banants	0 – 0 (1 – 2 agg.)	Shirak	Yerevan
13:00 (UTC+4)	Correa (yellow card) 20'	Report	A.Barikyan (yellow card) 20'; Tigranyan (yellow card) 20'; T.Davtyan (yellow card) 23'; Logvinaw (yellow card) 82'; Aleksanyan (yellow card) 90+3'	Stadium: Banants Stadium; Referee: Suren Baliyan

The Semifinal took place during the 2012–13 season.

== Statistics ==
As of match played 24 November 2011

=== Appearances and goals ===
No.	Pos	Nat	Player	Total		Premier League		2011 Armenian Cup		2011–12 Armenian Cup	
No.	Pos	Nat	Player	Apps	Goals	Apps	Goals	Apps	Goals	Apps	Goals
1	GK	(Georgia (country)) GEO	Gela Dzamunashvili	2	0	1+1	0	0	0	0	0
2	DF	(Armenia) ARM	Davit Mkrtchyan	1	0	0+1	0	0	0	0	0
3	DF	(Armenia) ARM	Armen Ghazaryan	19	0	16	0	2+1	0	0	0
4	DF	(Armenia) ARM	Hovhannes Tahmazyan	15	0	12+1	0	2	0	0	0
5	FW	(Senegal) SEN	Yoro Lamine Ly	12	2	9+1	2	0	0	2	0
6	MF	(Armenia) ARM	Armen Tigranyan	26	0	17+3	0	4	0	2	0
7	MF	(Armenia) ARM	Karen G.Khachatryan	18	1	10+5	1	0+2	0	1	0
8	MF	(Armenia) ARM	Tigran Davtyan	33	0	23+3	0	5	0	2	0
9	FW	(Armenia) ARM	Mkrtich Nalbandyan	26	3	15+8	3	2+1	0	0	0
10	MF	(Armenia) ARM	Davit Hakobyan	27	2	18+3	2	2+2	0	2	0
11	MF	(Armenia) ARM	Hrachya Mnatsakanyan	22	0	10+6	0	0+4	0	2	0
12	MF	(Armenia) ARM	Andranik Barikyan	28	13	17+5	10	4	2	2	1
13	DF	(Armenia) ARM	Rafael Paltajyan	12	0	10	0	0	0	2	0
14	DF	(Armenia) ARM	Ararat Harutyunyan	7	0	1+4	0	0	0	1+1	0
15	MF	(Armenia) ARM	Karen Aleksanyan	32	1	26	1	4	0	2	0
16	GK	(Belarus) BLR	Ihar Logvinaw	34	0	27	0	5	0	2	0
17	DF	(Armenia) ARM	Garnik Sargsyan	11	0	7+2	0	0	0	0+2	0
18	MF	(Armenia) ARM	Ara Mkrtchyan	31	0	13+13	0	3+1	0	0+1	0
20	MF	(Armenia) ARM	Karen Muradyan	10	0	3+5	0	0	0	0+2	0
21	DF	(Armenia) ARM	Gevorg Hovhannisyan	30	3	24	2	4	0	2	1
25	DF	(Armenia) ARM	Aghvan Davoyan	4	0	1+3	0	0	0	0	0
26	MF	(Armenia) ARM	Hayk Galstyan	1	0	0+1	0	0	0	0	0
27	FW	(Armenia) ARM	Aram Tosunyan	5	0	0+4	0	0+1	0	0	0
28	DF	(Armenia) ARM	Haykaz Gevorgyan	4	0	4	0	0	0	0	0
29	MF	(Armenia) ARM	Arman Margaryan	3	0	1+2	0	0	0	0	0
30	MF	(Armenia) ARM	Artur Davtyan	9	0	5+4	0	0	0	0	0
Players away on loan:
Players who left Shirak during the season:
2	DF	(Armenia) ARM	Hovhannes Grigoryan	13	1	8	0	4+1	1	0	0
5	DF	(Armenia) ARM	Artak Grigoryan	5	0	2	0	1+2	0	0	0
14	DF	(Armenia) ARM	Karen Stepanyan	6	0	0+5	0	0+1	0	0	0
19	MF	(Brazil) BRA	Tiago Lopez	12	1	8	0	4	1	0	0
22	FW	(Armenia) ARM	Karen N.Khachatryan	19	3	9+5	3	3+2	0	0	0
23	FW	(Belgium) BEL	Benjamin Kabongo	3	0	0+2	0	1	0	0	0
26	MF	(Armenia) ARM	Artak Oseyan	16	0	11	0	5	0	0	0

=== Goal scorers ===
Place	Position	Nation	Number	Name	Premier League	2011 Armenian Cup	2011–12 Armenian Cup	Total
1	MF	(Armenia)	12	Andranik Barikyan	10	2	1	13
2	FW	(Armenia)	9	Mkrtich Nalbandyan	3	1	0	4
3	FW	(Armenia)	22	Karen N. Khachatryan	3	0	0	3
3	DF	(Armenia)	21	Gevorg Hovhannisyan	2	0	1	3
5	MF	(Armenia)	10	Davit Hakobyan	2	0	0	2
5	FW	(Senegal)	5	Yoro Lamine Ly	2	0	0	2
7	MF	(Armenia)	15	Karen Aleksanyan	1	0	0	1
7	MF	(Armenia)	7	Karen G.Khachatryan	1	0	0	1
7	MF	(Brazil)	19	Tiago Lopez	0	1	0	1
7	DF	(Armenia)	2	Hovhannes Grigoryan	0	1	0	1
				Awarded	3	0	0	3
				TOTALS	27	5	2	34

=== Clean sheets ===
Place	Position	Nation	Number	Name	Premier League	2011 Armenian Cup	2011–12 Armenian Cup	Total
1	GK	(Belarus)	16	Ihar Logvinaw	6	2	1	9
				TOTALS	6	2	1	9

=== Disciplinary record ===
Number	Nation	Position	Name	Premier League		2011 Armenian Cup		2011–12 Armenian Cup		Total	
Number	Nation	Position	Name	Booked	Sent off (straight red)	Booked	Sent off (straight red)	Booked	Sent off (straight red)	Booked	Sent off (straight red)
3	(Armenia)	DF	Armen Ghazaryan	2	1	0	0	0	0	2	1
4	(Armenia)	DF	Hovhannes Tahmazyan	1	0	0	0	0	0	1	0
5	(Senegal)	FW	Yoro Lamine Ly	1	0	0	0	0	0	1	0
6	(Armenia)	MF	Armen Tigranyan	3	0	2	1	2	0	7	1
7	(Armenia)	MF	Karen G.Khachatryan	1	0	0	0	0	0	1	0
8	(Armenia)	MF	Tigran Davtyan	2	0	1	0	1	0	4	0
9	(Armenia)	FW	Mkrtich Nalbandyan	2	0	1	0	0	0	3	0
11	(Armenia)	MF	Hrachya Mnatsakanyan	3	0	0	0	0	0	3	0
12	(Armenia)	MF	Andranik Barikyan	6	0	3	0	1	0	10	0
15	(Armenia)	MF	Karen Aleksanyan	3	0	2	0	1	0	6	0
16	(Belarus)	GK	Ihar Logvinaw	1	0	1	0	1	0	3	0
17	(Armenia)	DF	Garnik Sargsyan	0	1	0	0	0	0	0	1
18	(Armenia)	MF	Ara Mkrtchyan	3	0	1	0	0	0	4	0
20	(Armenia)	DF	Rafael Paltajyan	2	0	0	0	0	0	2	0
21	(Armenia)	DF	Gevorg Hovhannisyan	4	1	2	0	0	0	6	1
28	(Armenia)	DF	Haykaz Gevorgyan	1	0	0	0	0	0	1	0
30	(Armenia)	DF	Artur Davtyan	1	0	0	0	0	0	1	0
Players away on loan:
Players who left Shirak during the season:
2	(Armenia)	DF	Hovhannes Grigoryan	2	0	0	0	0	0	2	0
19	(Brazil)	MF	Tiago Lopez	2	0	0	0	0	0	2	0
22	(Armenia)	FW	Karen N.Khachatryan	0	0	1	0	0	0	1	0
26	(Armenia)	MF	Artak Oseyan	1	0	0	0	0	0	1	0
			TOTALS	41	3	14	1	6	0	61	4
