= 2013–14 Shirak FC season =

Shirak
2013-14 season
- Chairman: Arman Sahakyan
- Manager: Vardan Bichakhchyan
- Stadium: Gyumri City Stadium
- Premier League: 2nd
- Armenian Cup: Quarterfinal vs Banants
- UEFA Champions League: Second qualifying round vs Partizan
- Top goalscorer: League: Serges Déblé (15); All: Serges Déblé (16)
- Highest home attendance: 2,860 vs Partizan (17 July 2013)
- Lowest home attendance: 0 vs Banants (15 March 2014); 0 vs Ulisses (11 May 2014)
- Average home league attendance: 1,033 (18 May 2014)

The 2013–14 season was Shirak's 23rd consecutive season in the Armenian Premier League and covers the period from 1 July 2013 to 30 June 2014.

== Squad ==
As of match played 18 May 2014

No.	Name	Nationality	Position	Date of birth (age)	Signed from	Signed in	Contract ends	Apps.	Goals
Goalkeepers
1	Norayr Abrahamyan	(Armenia)	GK	30 October 1985 (aged 28)	Academy	2009			
13	Daniel Hovhannisyan	(Armenia)	GK	9 April 1997 (aged 17)	Academy	2013		0	0
22	Artur Harutyunyan	(Armenia)	GK	12 August 1985 (aged 28)	Mika	2012		60	0
	Edgar Movsisyan	(Armenia)	GK	31 August 1988 (aged 25)	Academy	2013		0	0
Defenders
3	Artyom Mikaelyan	(Armenia)	DF	12 July 1991 (aged 22)	Youth team	2010		23	0
4	Didier Kadio	(Ivory Coast)	DF	5 April 1990 (aged 24)	SO de l'Armée	2012		74	5
7	Hrayr Mkoyan	(Armenia)	DF	2 September 1986 (aged 27)	Gandzasar Kapan	2014			
14	Arman Tadevosyan	(Armenia)	DF	26 September 1994 (aged 19)	Youth team	2013		0	0
17	Davit Marikyan	(Armenia)	DF	8 May 1993 (aged 21)	Bötzingen	2013		35	1
21	Gevorg Hovhannisyan	(Armenia)	DF	16 June 1983 (aged 30)	Youth team	2003			
25	Aghvan Davoyan	(Armenia)	DF	21 March 1990 (aged 24)	Youth team	2010			
Midfielders
5	Tigran Davtyan	(Armenia)	MF	10 June 1978 (aged 35)	Ulisses	2009			
10	Davit Hakobyan	(Armenia)	MF	21 March 1993 (aged 21)	Youth team	2010			
12	Andranik Barikyan	(Armenia)	MF	11 September 1980 (aged 33)	Youth team	1998			
15	Karen Aleksanyan	(Armenia)	MF	17 June 1980 (aged 33)	Ulisses	2011			
16	Shahen Shahinyan	(Armenia)	MF	12 February 1995 (aged 19)	Youth team	2013		0	0
19	Karen Muradyan	(Armenia)	MF	1 November 1992 (aged 21)	Youth team	2011			
23	Arman Aslanyan	(Armenia)	MF	30 January 1994 (aged 20)	Youth team	2013		0	0
33	Artur Gasparyan	(Armenia)	MF	17 May 1994 (aged 20)	Youth team	2011			
	Eboue Kouassi	(Ivory Coast)	MF	13 December 1997 (aged 16)	Youth team	2014		0	0
Forwards
8	Serges Déblé	(Ivory Coast)	FW	1 October 1989 (aged 24)	Khimki	2013		29	16
11	Edvard Panosyan	(Armenia)	FW	11 October 1992 (aged 21)	Youth team	2013		15	1
18	Aram Muradyan	(Armenia)	FW	14 April 1995 (aged 19)	Academy	2013		13	1
20	Yoro Lamine Ly	(Senegal)	FW	27 August 1988 (aged 25)	Bnei Yehuda	2014		75	24
27	Aram Tosunyan	(Armenia)	FW	29 May 1993 (aged 20)	Youth team	2011			
29	Dame Diop	(Senegal)	FW	15 February 1993 (aged 21)	Khimki	2013		62	19
30	David Ghandilyan	(Armenia)	FW	4 June 1993 (aged 20)	Youth team	2013		8	1
Players out on loan
Players who left during the season
6	Armen Tigranyan	(Armenia)	MF	27 November 1985 (aged 28)	Ulisses	2011			
9	Ismaël Fofana	(Ivory Coast)	FW	8 September 1988 (aged 25)	Séwé	2012		42	18
9	Boti Goa	(Ivory Coast)	FW	3 March 1989 (aged 25)	Zestafoni	2013		10	0
11	Jacob Asiedu-Apau	(Ghana)	MF	12 October 1994 (aged 19)	loan from Medeama	2013	2013	4	0
13	Samuel Kyere	(Ghana)	DF	6 August 1992 (aged 21)	Berekum Chelsea	2013		17	0
18	Ara Mkrtchyan	(Armenia)	MF	3 November 1984 (aged 29)	Youth team	2005			
24	George Odhiambo	(Kenya)	FW	31 December 1992 (aged 21)	Nairobi City Stars	2013		19	1
33	Kyaram Sevoyan	(Armenia)	MF	4 May 1994 (aged 20)	Metalurh Donetsk	2013		2	0
79	Karen Akopyan	(Russia)	MF	18 January 1992 (aged 22)	Dynamo Moscow	2013		13	0

== Transfers ==
=== In ===
Date	Position	Nationality	Name	From	Fee	Ref.
1 August 2013	FW	(Ivory Coast)	Serges Déblé	Khimki	Undisclosed	
22 August 2013	MF	(Armenia)	Kyaram Sevoyan	Metalurh Donetsk	Undisclosed	
23 August 2013	MF	(Russia)	Karen Akopyan	Dynamo Moscow	Undisclosed	
30 August 2013	FW	(Ivory Coast)	Boti Goa	Zestafoni	Undisclosed	
1 January 2014	MF	(Ivory Coast)	Eboue Kouassi	Académie Symbiose Foot d'Abobo	Undisclosed	
20 January 2014	DF	(Armenia)	Hrayr Mkoyan	Gandzasar Kapan	Undisclosed	
27 February 2014	FW	(Senegal)	Yoro Lamine Ly	Bnei Yehuda	Undisclosed	

=== Loan in ===
Start date	Position	Nationality	Name	From	End date	Ref.
1 July 2013	MF	(Ghana)	Jacob Asiedu-Apau	Medeama	31 December 2013	

=== Out ===
Date	Position	Nationality	Name	From	Fee	Ref.
2 August 2013	FW	(Kenya)	George Odhiambo	Ulisses	Undisclosed	
6 August 2013	FW	(Ivory Coast)	Ismaël Fofana	Partizan	Undisclosed	
22 August 2013	DF	(Ghana)	Samuel Kyere	Asante Kotoko	Undisclosed	
27 February 2014	MF	(Russia)	Karen Akopyan	Smena	Undisclosed	
28 February 2014	FW	(Ivory Coast)	Boti Goa	Zhetysu	Undisclosed	

=== Released ===
Date	Position	Nationality	Name	Joined	Date
28 August 2013	MF	(Armenia)	Ara Mkrtchyan	Retired	
1 January 2014	MF	(Armenia)	Kyaram Sevoyan	Retired	
1 January 2014	MF	(Armenia)	Armen Tigranyan	Ulisses	
30 June 2014	MF	(Armenia)	Artur Gasparyan		

== Competitions ==
=== Armenian Supercup ===
24 September 2013	Shirak	2 – 0	Pyunik	Yerevan
17:00 (UTC+4)	Déblé 29'; D.Marikyan (yellow card) 73'; Diop (yellow card) 76'; Kadio (yellow card) 82' (goal) 86'	Report	H.Asoyan (yellow card) 21'	Stadium: Vazgen Sargsyan Republican Stadium; Referee: Zaven Hovhannisyan

=== Premier League ===
==== Results summary ====
Overall								Home						Away					
Pld	W	D	L	GF	GA	GD	Pts	W	D	L	GF	GA	GD	W	D	L	GF	GA	GD
28	13	8	7	48	31	+17	47	7	4	3	26	16	+10	6	4	4	22	15	+7

Last updated: 18 May 2014.
Source: See Results

==== Results ====
4 August 2013 1	Shirak	2 – 3	Gandzasar Kapan	Gyumri
18:00 (UTC+4)	Fofana 31'; A.Barikyan (yellow card) 35'; Kadio 90'	Report	Dashyan 13', 33' (yellow card) 90+3'; A.Beglaryan (yellow card) 78'; D.Marikyan 83' (o.g.)	Stadium: Gyumri City Stadium; Attendance: 1,000; Referee: Suren Baliyan

18 August 2013 2	Alashkert	1 – 1	Shirak	Yerevan
19:00 (UTC+4)	T.Grigoryan (yellow card) 28'; T.Beglaryan (yellow card) 35'; Shishkov 42'; S.Galstyan (yellow card) 57'; E. Hovhannisyan (yellow card) 90+3'	Report	Déblé 38'	Stadium: Vazgen Sargsyan Republican Stadium; Attendance: 500; Referee: Zaven Hovhannisyan

25 August 2013 3	Shirak	2 – 1	Banants	Gyumri
17:00 (UTC+4)	Rodríguez 32' (pen.) (yellow card) 65'; Malakyan (yellow card) 43'; V.Ayvazyan (yellow card) 56'; Hambardzumyan (yellow card) 64'	Report	A.Barikyan 43', 65' (pen.) (yellow card) 74'; Diop (yellow card) 65'	Stadium: Gyumri City Stadium; Attendance: 1,000; Referee: Arman Ghushchyan

31 August 2013 4	Ulisses	0 – 3	Shirak	Yerevan
19:00 (UTC+4)	Ugrekhelidze (yellow card) 22'; Harutyunyan (yellow card) 67'; Kasule (red card) 90+4'	Report	Kadio 9'; Déblé (yellow card) 29' (goal) 86', 87'; K.Muradyan (red card) 90+4'	Stadium: Yerevan Football Academy Stadium; Attendance: 300; Referee: Arman Ghushchyan

14 September 2013 5	Shirak	1 – 1	Ararat Yerevan	Gyumri
17:00 (UTC+4)	A.Davoyan 51'; A.Barikyan (yellow card) 74'	Report	G.Nranyan 44'; V.Kаrаpetyan (yellow card) 70'; A.Rakic (yellow card) 85'; Balabekyan (yellow card) 90+2'	Stadium: Gyumri City Stadium; Attendance: 1,000; Referee: Zaven Hovhannisyan

21 September 2013 6	Shirak	0 – 2	Pyunik	Gyumri
16:00 (UTC+4)	D.Marikyan (yellow card) 35'; Kadio (yellow card) 75'	Report	Malakyan (yellow card) 29'; Ga.Poghosyan 36' (yellow card) 44'; Papikyan 75'	Stadium: Gyumri City Stadium; Attendance: 1,500; Referee: Tigran Hovsepyan

28 September 2013 7	Mika	2 – 2	Shirak	Yerevan
15:00 (UTC+4)	A.Hakobyan 1'; Karapetyan (yellow card) 32'; A.Petrosyan (yellow card) 35'; A.Adamyan 89'	Report	Déblé 7', 39'	Stadium: Mika Stadium; Attendance: 300; Referee: Gevorg Eghoyan

19 October 2013 9	Shirak	5 – 2	Alashkert	Gyumri
15:00 (UTC+4)	Hakobyan 50'; A.Barikyan (yellow card) 51' (goal) 53', 60'; Déblé 63'; D.Ghandilyan 83'	Report	M.Manasyan 7'; T.Hakhnazaryan (yellow card) 48'; T.Beglaryan (yellow card) 66'; T.Grigoryan 79'	Stadium: Gyumri City Stadium; Attendance: 500; Referee: Gevorg Eghoyan

27 October 2013 10	Banants	1 – 0	Shirak	Yerevan
15:00 (UTC+4)	Hovsepyan 87'	Report	K.Muradyan (yellow card) 41'; D.Marikyan (yellow card) 64'; N.Abrahamyan (yellow card) 88'; Kadio (yellow card) 90+3'	Stadium: Banants Stadium; Attendance: 500; Referee: Zaven Hovhannisyan

30 October 2013 8	Gandzasar Kapan	2 – 0	Shirak	Kapan
15:00 (UTC+4)	Mkoyan (yellow card) 18'; Obradović (yellow card) 32'; S.Jikia 42'; N.Beglaryan 68'; A.Grigoryan (yellow card) 82'	Report		Stadium: Gandzasar Stadium; Attendance: 1,000; Referee: Tigran Hovsepyan

2 November 2013 11	Shirak	2 – 1	Ulisses	Gyumri
15:00 (UTC+4)	Diop 53', 60'; D.Marikyan (yellow card) 70'; G.Hovhannisyan (yellow card) 90'	Report	L.Ngavouka-Tseke (yellow card) 56'; Sahakyan (yellow card) 73'; R.Yeghiazaryan (yellow card) 82'; O.Hambardzumyan (yellow card) 88'	Stadium: Gyumri City Stadium; Attendance: 500; Referee: Suren Baliyan

9 November 2013 12	Ararat Yerevan	0 – 3	Shirak	Yerevan
16:00 (UTC+4)		Report	Diop 2'; Aleksanyan (yellow card) 27'; Déblé 33'; K.Muradyan 90'	Stadium: Hrazdan Stadium; Attendance: 200; Referee: Zaven Hovhannisyan

24 November 2013 13	Pyunik	1 – 2	Shirak	Yerevan
16:00 (UTC+4)	V.Bakalyan 45'; Voskanyan (yellow card) 70'	Report	Déblé 45'; Hakobyan 68'; D.Marikyan (yellow card) 83'	Stadium: Yerevan Football Academy Stadium; Attendance: 300; Referee: Tigran Hovsepyan

30 November 2013 14	Shirak	1 – 1	Mika	Gyumri
14:00 (UTC+4)	Déblé 49' (yellow card) 81'; G.Hovhannisyan (yellow card) 61'; A.Barikyan (yellow card) 68'; Kadio (yellow card) 83'	Report	A.Petrosyan (yellow card) 41'; V.Satumyan 82'; Go.Poghosyan (yellow card) 87'	Stadium: Gyumri City Stadium; Attendance: 300; Referee: Gevorg Eghoyan

2 March 2014 15	Shirak	1 – 1	Gandzasar Kapan	Gyumri
14:00 (UTC+4)	Diop 31'; Hakobyan (yellow card) 41'; Aleksanyan (yellow card) 72'; A.Muradyan (yellow card) 90+1'	Report	Obradović (yellow card) 11'; Vukomanović (yellow card) 32'; S.Jikia 65'; A.Khachatryan (yellow card) 68'; A.Hambartsumyan (yellow card) 81'	Stadium: Gyumri City Stadium; Attendance: 700; Referee: Suren Baliyan

9 March 2014 16	Alashkert	1 – 2	Shirak	Yerevan
16:00 (UTC+4)	N.Davtyan (yellow card) 16'; M.Manasyan 22'; A.Hayrapetyan (yellow card) 43'	Report	Déblé 74'; D.Marikyan 75'	Stadium: Hrazdan Stadium; Attendance: 500; Referee: Gevorg Eghoyan

15 March 2014 17	Shirak	0 – 1	Banants	Gyumri
15:00 (UTC+4)	G.Hovhannisyan (yellow card) 79'	Report	D.Marikyan 83' (o.g.)	Stadium: Gyumri City Stadium; Referee: Zaven Hovhannisyan

23 March 2014 18	Ulisses	0 – 2	Shirak	Abovyan
15:00 (UTC+4)	Grigoryan (yellow card) 39'; A.Petrosyan (yellow card) 56'	Report	G.Hovhannisyan (yellow card) 31'; Diop 34', 65'	Stadium: Abovyan City Stadium; Attendance: 500; Referee: Zaven Hovhannisyan

29 March 2014 19	Shirak	0 – 0	Ararat Yerevan	Gyumri
15:00 (UTC+4)	Diop (yellow card) 35'	Report	Balabekyan (yellow card) 71'; M.Sahakyan (yellow card) 82'; N.Grigoryan (yellow card) 85'	Stadium: Gyumri City Stadium; Attendance: 1,500; Referee: Suren Baliyan

6 April 2014 20	Shirak	3 – 1	Pyunik	Gyumri
16:00 (UTC+4)	Diop 42'; A.Barikyan 66' (yellow card) 66'; Déblé (yellow card) 82'; G.Hovhannisyan 90' (o.g.)	Report	V.Minasyan (yellow card) 7'; S.Baloyan 24' (yellow card) 81'; Malakyan (yellow card) 52'; Haroyan (yellow card) 66'	Stadium: Gyumri City Stadium; Attendance: 1,000; Referee: Tigran Hovsepyan

12 April 2014 21	Mika	1 – 1	Shirak	Yerevan
16:00 (UTC+4)	J.John (yellow card) 24'; Alex 31' (pen.); A.Adamyan (yellow card) 37'; Go.Poghosyan (yellow card) 88'	Report	G.Hovhannisyan (yellow card) 30'; Mkoyan (yellow card) 37'; A.Barikyan (yellow card) 40'; Déblé (yellow card) 47' (goal) 64'	Stadium: Mika Stadium; Attendance: 1,000; Referee: Zaven Hovhannisyan

19 April 2014 22	Gandzasar Kapan	0 – 0	Shirak	Kapan
16:00 (UTC+4)		Report	D.Marikyan (yellow card) 45'; Ly (yellow card) 87'	Stadium: Gandzasar Stadium; Attendance: 700; Referee: Tigran Hovsepyan

23 April 2014 27	Pyunik	2 – 1	Shirak	Yerevan
18:00 (UTC+4)	S.Baloyan 14', 18'; A.Sardaryan (yellow card) 66'	Report	Déblé (yellow card) 41'; Hakobyan (yellow card) 58'; G.Hovhannisyan 86'	Stadium: Yerevan Football Academy Stadium; Attendance: 300; Referee: Manuk Fahradyan

26 April 2014 23	Shirak	4 – 1	Alashkert	Gyumri
17:00 (UTC+4)	Davtyan 3'; Déblé 43'; D.Marikyan (yellow card) 46'; Hakobyan 52'; Ly 60'	Report	N.Gyozalyan 47' (pen.)	Stadium: Gyumri City Stadium; Attendance: 700; Referee: Zaven Hovhannisyan

30 April 2014 28	Shirak	2 – 0	Mika	Gyumri
17:00 (UTC+4)	A.Barikyan (yellow card) 36'; A.Muradyan 80' (yellow card) 83'; Déblé 90'	Report	Karapetyan (yellow card) 64'; Go.Poghosyan (yellow card) 72'; A.Voskanyan (yellow card) 82'	Stadium: Gyumri City Stadium; Attendance: 1,500; Referee: Tigran Hovsepyan

3 May 2014 24	Banants	3 – 1	Shirak	Yerevan
17:00 (UTC+4)	Hovsepyan 27'; Hambardzumyan (yellow card) 33' (goal) 35'; Karapetyan 68'; V.Ayvazyan (yellow card) 70'; Štepanovský (yellow card) 90+3'	Report	Déblé (yellow card) 65'; E.Panosyan 76'	Stadium: Banants Stadium; Attendance: 700; Referee: Tigran Hovsepyan

11 May 2014 25	Shirak	3 – 1	Ulisses	Gyumri
17:00 (UTC+4)	Hakobyan 19'; Déblé 25'; Diop 76'	Report	Harutyunyan 50'	Stadium: Gyumri City Stadium; Attendance: 0 Referee: Gevorg Eghoyan

18 May 2014 26	Ararat Yerevan	1 – 4	Shirak	Yerevan
17:00 (UTC+4)	Stamenković (yellow card) 37'; Bareghamyan 68'	Report	Diop 31'; A.Barikyan 45'; K.Muradyan (yellow card) 48'; Déblé 50'; Ly 75'; N.Abrahamyan (yellow card) 80'	Stadium: Hrazdan Stadium; Attendance: 500; Referee: Suren Baliyan

==== Table ====
Pos	Team	Pld	W	D	L	GF	GA	GD	Pts	Qualification
1	Banants (C)	28	14	8	6	38	23	+15	50	Qualification for the Champions League first qualifying round
2	Shirak	28	13	8	7	48	31	+17	47	Qualification for the Europa League first qualifying round
3	Mika	28	12	11	5	36	27	+9	47	Qualification for the Europa League first qualifying round
4	Ararat Yerevan	28	12	8	8	30	23	+7	44	
5	Gandzasar Kapan	28	8	11	9	36	31	+5	35	

Source: Soccerway
Rules for classification: 1) points; 2) goal difference; 3) number of goals scored.
(C) Champions

=== Armenian Cup ===
2 October 2013 Quarterfinal 1st leg	Shirak	1 – 2	Banants	Ijevan
16:00 (UTC+4)	A.Barikyan 26'; Kadio (yellow card) 90+1'	Report	Malakyan 27', 80'; V.Yeghiazaryan (yellow card) 29'; Hanzel (yellow card) 43'; A.Toroyan (yellow card) 89'	Stadium: Arnar Stadium; Attendance: 900; Referee: Suren Baliyan
Note: Match played at the Arnar Stadium in Ijevan instead of Shirak's regular City Stadium in Gyumri.

23 October 2013 Quarterfinal 2nd leg	Banants	0 – 1 ((a) 2 – 2 agg.)	Shirak	Yerevan
15:00 (UTC+4)	Hanzel (yellow card) 26'; V.Ayvazyan (yellow card) 44'; N.Minasyan (yellow card) 55'; Fofana (yellow card) 88'	Report	Diop 36'; K.Muradyan (yellow card) 83'; A.Barikyan (yellow card) 88'	Stadium: Banants Stadium; Attendance: 300; Referee: Tigran Hovsepyan

=== UEFA Champions League ===
==== Qualifying rounds ====
2 July 2013 First Qualifying Round 1st leg	Shirak (Armenia)	3 – 0	(San Marino) Tre Penne	Gyumri, Armenia
17:00 (UTC+4)	Diop (penalty missed) 11'; Fofana 36', 55', 64'; G.Hovhannisyan (yellow card) 73'	Report	C.Valentini (yellow card) 59'	Stadium: Gyumri City Stadium; Attendance: 2,600; Referee: Alexandr Aliyev (Kazakhstan)

9 July 2013 First Qualifying Round 2nd leg	Tre Penne (San Marino)	1 – 0 (1 – 3 agg.)	(Armenia) Shirak	Serravalle, San Marino
23:00 (UTC+4)	Kyere 2' (o.g.); D.Pignieri (yellow card) 24'; Cibelli (yellow card) 39'; Gasperoni (yellow card) 45+2'; L.Capicchioni (yellow card) 48'; C.Valentini (yellow card) 74'; Chiaruzzi (yellow card) 77'; G.Cardini (yellow card) 90+3'	Report	Kadio (yellow card) 24'; Fofana (yellow card) 58'; D.Marikyan (yellow card) 69' (red card) 90+3'; Aleksanyan (yellow card) 88'	Stadium: San Marino Stadium; Attendance: 453; Referee: Laurent Kopriwa (Luxembourg)

17 July 2013 Second Qualifying Round 1st leg	Shirak (Armenia)	1 – 1	(Serbia) Partizan	Gyumri, Armenia
17:00 (UTC+4)	Hakobyan 48'; K.Muradyan (yellow card) 84'	Report	Marković (yellow card) 45'; Volkov (yellow card) 70' (goal) 90+3'	Stadium: Gyumri City Stadium; Attendance: 2,860; Referee: Libor Kovařík (Czech Republic)

24 July 2013 Second Qualifying Round 2nd leg	Partizan (Serbia)	0 – 0 ((a) 1 – 1 agg.)	(Armenia) Shirak	Belgrade, Serbia
22:45 (UTC+4)	Ostojić (yellow card) 35'; Volkov (red card) 55'	Report	Kadio (yellow card) 48'; Fofana (yellow card) 56'	Stadium: Partizan Stadium; Attendance: 15,742; Referee: Ioannis Anastasiou (Cyprus)

== Statistics ==
As of match played 18 May 2014

=== Appearances and goals ===
No.	Pos	Nat	Player	Total		Premier League		Armenian Cup		Armenian Supercup		UEFA Champions League	
No.	Pos	Nat	Player	Apps	Goals	Apps	Goals	Apps	Goals	Apps	Goals	Apps	Goals
1	GK	(Armenia) ARM	Norayr Abrahamyan	18	0	15	0	2	0	1	0	0	0
3	DF	(Armenia) ARM	Artyom Mikaelyan	13	0	9+1	0	2	0	1	0	0	0
4	DF	(Ivory Coast) CIV	Didier Kadio	23	3	17	2	1	0	1	1	4	0
5	MF	(Armenia) ARM	Tigran Davtyan	34	1	27+1	1	1+1	0	1	0	2+1	0
7	DF	(Armenia) ARM	Hrayr Mkoyan	13	0	12+1	0	0	0	0	0	0	0
8	FW	(Ivory Coast) CIV	Serges Déblé	29	16	26	15	1+1	0	1	1	0	0
10	MF	(Armenia) ARM	Davit Hakobyan	33	5	22+4	4	1+1	0	1	0	4	1
11	FW	(Armenia) ARM	Edvard Panosyan	15	1	4+9	1	1	0	0	0	0+1	0
12	MF	(Armenia) ARM	Andranik Barikyan	30	8	20+4	7	1+1	1	1	0	3	0
15	MF	(Armenia) ARM	Karen Aleksanyan	29	0	23+1	0	0	0	1	0	4	0
17	DF	(Armenia) ARM	Davit Marikyan	30	1	23+2	1	2	0	1	0	0+2	0
18	FW	(Armenia) ARM	Aram Muradyan	12	1	0+12	1	0	0	0	0	0	0
19	MF	(Armenia) ARM	Karen Muradyan	32	1	25	1	2	0	1	0	4	0
20	FW	(Senegal) SEN	Yoro Lamine Ly	13	2	10+3	2	0	0	0	0	0	0
21	DF	(Armenia) ARM	Gevorg Hovhannisyan	32	1	23+3	1	1	0	0+1	0	4	0
22	GK	(Armenia) ARM	Artur Harutyunyan	17	0	13	0	0	0	0	0	4	0
25	DF	(Armenia) ARM	Aghvan Davoyan	17	0	8+5	0	2	0	0	0	2	0
27	FW	(Armenia) ARM	Aram Tosunyan	1	0	0+1	0	0	0	0	0	0	0
29	FW	(Senegal) SEN	Dame Diop	32	10	21+4	9	2	1	1	0	4	0
30	FW	(Armenia) ARM	David Ghandilyan	8	1	0+7	1	1	0	0	0	0	0
Players away on loan:
Players who left Shirak during the season:
9	FW	(Ivory Coast) CIV	Ismaël Fofana	5	4	1	1	0	0	0	0	4	3
9	FW	(Ivory Coast) CIV	Boti Goa	10	0	3+4	0	0+2	0	0+1	0	0	0
11	MF	(Ghana) GHA	Jacob Asiedu-Apau	4	0	0+2	0	0	0	0	0	0+2	0
13	DF	(Ghana) GHA	Samuel Kyere	5	0	1	0	0	0	0	0	4	0
18	MF	(Armenia) ARM	Ara Mkrtchyan	2	0	0	0	0	0	0	0	0+2	0
24	FW	(Kenya) KEN	George Odhiambo	4	0	0	0	0	0	0	0	1+3	0
33	MF	(Armenia) ARM	Kyaram Sevoyan	2	0	0+2	0	0	0	0	0	0	0
79	MF	(Russia) RUS	Karen Akopyan	13	0	5+5	0	2	0	0+1	0	0	0

=== Goal scorers ===
Place	Position	Nation	Number	Name	Premier League	Armenian Cup	Armenian Supercup	UEFA Champions League	Total
1	FW	(Ivory Coast)	8	Serges Déblé	15	0	1	0	16
2	FW	(Senegal)	29	Dame Diop	9	1	0	0	10
3	MF	(Armenia)	12	Andranik Barikyan	7	1	0	0	8
4	MF	(Armenia)	10	Davit Hakobyan	4	0	0	1	5
5	FW	(Ivory Coast)	9	Ismaël Fofana	1	0	0	3	4
6	DF	(Ivory Coast)	4	Didier Kadio	2	0	1	0	3
7	FW	(Senegal)	20	Yoro Lamine Ly	2	0	0	0	2
8	DF	(Armenia)	21	Gevorg Hovhannisyan	1	0	0	0	1
8	DF	(Armenia)	17	Davit Marikyan	1	0	0	0	1
8	MF	(Armenia)	8	Tigran Davtyan	1	0	0	0	1
8	FW	(Armenia)	31	Edvard Panosyan	1	0	0	0	1
8	MF	(Armenia)	19	Karen Muradyan	1	0	0	0	1
8	FW	(Armenia)	32	David Ghandilyan	1	0	0	0	1
8	FW	(Armenia)	18	Aram Muradyan	1	0	0	0	1
8				Own goal	1	0	0	0	1
				TOTALS	48	2	2	4	54

=== Clean sheets ===
Place	Position	Nation	Number	Name	Premier League	Armenian Cup	Armenian Supercup	UEFA Champions League	Total
1	GK	(Armenia)	22	Artur Harutyunyan	3	0	0	2	5
1	GK	(Armenia)	1	Norayr Abrahamyan	3	1	1	0	5
				TOTALS	6	1	1	2	9

=== Disciplinary record ===
Number	Nation	Position	Name	Premier League		Armenian Cup		Armenian Supercup		UEFA Champions League		Total	
Number	Nation	Position	Name	Yellow card	Red card	Yellow card	Red card	Yellow card	Red card	Yellow card	Red card	Yellow card	Red card
1	(Armenia)	GK	Norayr Abrahamyan	2	0	0	0	0	0	0	0	2	0
4	(Ivory Coast)	DF	Didier Kadio	3	0	1	0	1	0	2	0	7	0
8	(Ivory Coast)	FW	Serges Déblé	5	0	0	0	0	0	0	0	5	0
10	(Armenia)	MF	Davit Hakobyan	2	0	0	0	0	0	0	0	2	0
12	(Armenia)	MF	Andranik Barikyan	6	0	1	0	0	0	0	0	7	0
15	(Armenia)	MF	Karen Aleksanyan	2	0	0	0	0	0	1	0	3	0
17	(Armenia)	DF	Davit Marikyan	6	0	0	0	1	0	1	1	8	1
18	(Armenia)	FW	Aram Muradyan	2	0	0	0	0	0	0	0	2	0
19	(Armenia)	MF	Karen Muradyan	2	1	1	0	0	0	1	0	4	1
20	(Senegal)	FW	Yoro Lamine Ly	1	0	0	0	0	0	0	0	1	0
21	(Armenia)	DF	Gevorg Hovhannisyan	4	0	0	0	0	0	1	0	5	0
25	(Armenia)	DF	Aghvan Davoyan	1	0	0	0	0	0	0	0	1	0
29	(Senegal)	FW	Dame Diop	2	0	0	0	1	0	0	0	3	0
Players away on loan:
Players who left Shirak during the season:
9	(Ivory Coast)	FW	Ismaël Fofana	0	0	0	0	0	0	2	0	2	0
			TOTALS	38	1	3	0	3	0	8	1	52	2
