= 2015–16 FC Shirak season =

Shirak
2015-16 season
- Chairman: Arman Sahakyan
- Manager: Vardan Bichakhchyan
- Stadium: Gyumri City Stadium
- Premier League: 2nd
- Armenian Cup: Quarterfinal vs Mika
- UEFA Europa League: Second Qualifying Round vs AIK
- Top goalscorer: League: Konan Kouakou (6); All: Konan Kouakou (6)
- Highest home attendance: 2,820 vs AIK (23 July 2015)
- Lowest home attendance: 400 vs Gandzasar Kapan (29 November 2015)
- Average home league attendance: 993 (22 May 2016)

The 2015–16 season was Shirak's 25th consecutive season in the Armenian Premier League and covers the period from 1 July 2015 to 30 June 2016.

== Squad ==
As of match played 22 May 2016

No.	Name	Nationality	Position	Date of birth (age)	Signed from	Signed in	Contract ends	Apps.	Goals
Goalkeepers
1	Norayr Abrahamyan	(Armenia)	GK	30 October 1985 (aged 30)	Academy	2009			
55	Armen Khachatryan	(Armenia)	GK	25 September 1984 (aged 31)	Alashkert	2016		11	0
Defenders
2	Arman Hovhannisyan	(Armenia)	DF	7 July 1993 (aged 22)	Alashkert	2015		31	1
3	Artyom Mikaelyan	(Armenia)	DF	12 July 1991 (aged 24)	Youth team	2010		41	0
4	Edgar Espinoza	(United States)	DF	27 May 1989 (aged 26)	Cal FC	2016		0	0
14	Arman Tadevosyan	(Armenia)	DF	26 September 1994 (aged 21)	Youth team	2013		8	0
20	Miloš Stamenković	(Serbia)	DF	1 June 1990 (aged 25)	Ararat Yerevan	2014		48	3
21	Gevorg Hovhannisyan	(Armenia)	DF	16 June 1983 (aged 32)	Youth team	2003			
23	Robert Darbinyan	(Armenia)	DF	1 June 1990 (aged 25)		2016		31	1
25	Aghvan Davoyan	(Armenia)	DF	21 March 1990 (aged 26)	Youth team	2010			
Midfielders
6	Mohamed Kaba	(Ivory Coast)	MF	5 April 1989 (aged 27)	Al Ahli	2015		28	2
8	Rumyan Hovsepyan	(Armenia)	MF	13 November 1991 (aged 24)	Stal Dniprodzerzhynsk	2016		10	3
10	Davit Hakobyan	(Armenia)	MF	21 March 1993 (aged 23)	Youth team	2010			
15	Karen Aleksanyan	(Armenia)	MF	17 June 1980 (aged 35)	Ulisses	2011			
16	Arman Aslanyan	(Armenia)	MF	30 January 1994 (aged 22)	Youth team	2013		7	0
19	Solomon Udo	(Nigeria)	MF	15 July 1995 (aged 20)	Ulisses	2016		10	0
35	Shahen Shahinyan	(Armenia)	MF	12 February 1995 (aged 21)	Youth team	2013		1	0
41	Vahan Bichakhchyan	(Armenia)	MF	9 July 1999 (aged 16)	Youth team	2015		1	0
77	Nemanja Stošković	(Serbia)	MF	21 February 1990 (aged 26)		2016		9	2
Forwards
7	Viulen Ayvazyan	(Armenia)	FW	1 January 1995 (aged 21)	Pyunik	2015		32	7
9	Konan Kouakou	(Ivory Coast)	FW	27 October 1995 (aged 20)		2015		21	6
11	Edvard Panosyan	(Armenia)	FW	11 October 1992 (aged 23)	Youth team	2013		31	1
18	Aram Muradyan	(Armenia)	FW	14 April 1995 (aged 21)	Academy	2013		43	2
24	Eder Arreola	(United States)	FW	13 November 1991 (aged 24)	Ventura County Fusion	2016		10	0
27	Aram Tosunyan	(Armenia)	FW	29 May 1993 (aged 22)	Youth team	2011			
36	Drissa Diarrassouba	(Ivory Coast)	FW	15 November 1994 (aged 21)	Ivoire Academie	2016		45	7
Players out on loan
Players who left during the season
5	Tigran Davtyan	(Armenia)	MF	10 June 1978 (aged 37)	Ulisses	2009			
8	Gor Malakyan	(Armenia)	MF	12 June 1994 (aged 21)	Alashkert	2015		30	4
9	Jean-Jacques Bougouhi	(Ivory Coast)	FW	12 June 1992 (aged 23)	SO de l'Armée	2014		32	24
12	Andranik Barikyan	(Armenia)	MF	11 September 1980 (aged 35)	Youth team	1998			
13	Gor Elyazyan	(Armenia)	GK	1 June 1991 (aged 24)	Mika	2014		39	0
22	Edgar Malakyan	(Armenia)	MF	22 September 1990 (aged 25)	Alashkert	2015		27	2
45	Vsevolod Yermakov	(Russia)	GK	6 January 1996 (aged 20)		2015		5	0

== Transfers ==
=== In ===
Date	Position	Nationality	Name	From	Fee	Ref.
1 July 2015	GK	(Russia)	Vsevolod Yermakov		Free	
2 July 2015	DF	(Armenia)	Arman Hovhannisyan	Alashkert	Undisclosed	
22 July 2015	MF	(Ivory Coast)	Mohamed Kaba	Al Ahli	Undisclosed	
27 August 2015	FW	(Ivory Coast)	Konan Kouakou		Free	
9 January 2016	DF	(Armenia)	Robert Darbinyan		Free	
20 January 2016	FW	(Ivory Coast)	Drissa Diarrassouba	Ivoire Academie	Undisclosed	
24 January 2016	GK	(Armenia)	Armen Khachatryan	Alashkert	Undisclosed	
16 February 2016	MF	(Armenia)	Rumyan Hovsepyan	Stal Dniprodzerzhynsk	Undisclosed	
14 February 2016	MF	(United States)	Eder Arreola	Ventura County Fusion	Undisclosed	
16 February 2016	DF	(United States)	Edgar Espinoza	Cal FC	Undisclosed	
29 February 2016	MF	(Nigeria)	Solomon Udo	Ulisses	Free	
29 February 2016	MF	(Serbia)	Nemanja Stošković		Free	

=== Out ===
Date	Position	Nationality	Name	From	Fee	Ref.
7 August 2015	GK	(Russia)	Vsevolod Yermakov	Torpedo Armavir	Undisclosed	
7 August 2015	FW	(Ivory Coast)	Jean-Jacques Bougouhi	Torpedo Armavir	Undisclosed	
23 February 2016	MF	(Armenia)	Edgar Malakyan	Stal Dniprodzerzhynsk	Undisclosed	
23 February 2016	MF	(Armenia)	Gor Malakyan	Stal Dniprodzerzhynsk	Undisclosed	

=== Released ===
Date	Position	Nationality	Name	Joined	Date
1 August 2015	MF	(Armenia)	Tigran Davtyan	Retired	
31 December 2015	GK	(Armenia)	Gor Elyazyan		
19 January 2016	MF	(Armenia)	Andranik Barikyan	Retired	
2 June 2016	DF	(Serbia)	Miloš Stamenković	Stal Kamianske	
30 June 2016	GK	(Armenia)	Armen Khachatryan		
30 June 2016	DF	(United States)	Edgar Espinoza	Tulsa Roughnecks	

== Competitions ==
=== Premier League ===
==== Results summary ====
Overall								Home						Away					
Pld	W	D	L	GF	GA	GD	Pts	W	D	L	GF	GA	GD	W	D	L	GF	GA	GD
28	15	7	6	41	27	+14	52	8	2	4	22	15	+7	7	5	2	19	12	+7

Last updated: 22 May 2016.
Source: See Results

==== Results ====
2 August 2015 1	Shirak	2 – 1	Gandzasar Kapan	Gyumri
17:30 (UTC+4)	Aleksanyan (yellow card) 7'; G.Hovhannisyan (yellow card) 20'; E.Malakyan (yellow card) 26'; Petrosyan 54' (o.g.); A.Hovhannisyan (yellow card) 70'; Bougouhi 82'	Report	Musonda (yellow card) 33'; A.Hambartsumyan (yellow card) 37'; Barseghyan 52'	Stadium: Gyumri City Stadium; Attendance: 1,000; Referee: Suren Baliyan

9 August 2015 2	Shirak	3 – 2	Ulisses	Gyumri
18:00 (UTC+4)	A.Muradyan (yellow card) 22'; Hakobyan 38', 87' (pen.); Stamenković (yellow card) 49'; Vi.Ayvazyan 59'	Report	Lomaia (yellow card) 21'; Stamenković 31' (o.g.); Ivanović 66'; Tigranyan (yellow card) 86'	Stadium: Gyumri City Stadium; Attendance: 800; Referee: Artur Safaryan

15 August 2015 3	Shirak	2 – 0	Mika	Gyumri
17:30 (UTC+4)	A.Davoyan (yellow card) 11'; G.Hovhannisyan (yellow card) 24'; Vi.Ayvazyan 36'; G.Malakyan 74'; E.Panosyan (yellow card) 77'; Stamenković (yellow card) 79'	Report	N.Balayan (yellow card) 23'; Toboyev (yellow card) 63'; Kvekveskiri (yellow card) 80'	Stadium: Gyumri City Stadium; Attendance: 800; Referee: Artur Simonyan

23 August 2015 4	Pyunik	3 – 0	Shirak	Yerevan
19:00 (UTC+4)	Hovhannisyan 10'; Yuspashyan (yellow card) 31' (goal) 42'; R.Hakobyan (yellow card) 61'; A.Nadiryan (yellow card) 81'	Report	Aleksanyan (yellow card) 38'; G.Malakyan (yellow card) 39'	Stadium: Yerevan Football Academy Stadium; Attendance: 600; Referee: Artur Simonyan

29 August 2015 5	Shirak	1 – 1	Banants	Gyumri
17:30 (UTC+4)	K.Kouakou 33'; A.Barikyan (yellow card) 90'	Report	J.Jeremiah (yellow card) 32'; Laércio 89' (pen.)	Stadium: Gyumri City Stadium; Attendance: 500; Referee: Edgar Sahakyan

12 September 2015 6	Ararat Yerevan	0 – 2	Shirak	Yerevan
17:30 (UTC+4)	G.Nranyan (yellow card) 69' de la Fuente (yellow card) 86'	Report	Hakobyan 16'; E.Malakyan 47'; G.Hovhannisyan (yellow card) 71'; G.Elyazyan (yellow card) 81'	Stadium: Vazgen Sargsyan Republican Stadium; Attendance: 400; Referee: Artur Simonyan

19 September 2015 7	Shirak	1 – 2	Alashkert	Gyumri
17:00 (UTC+4)	Hakobyan (yellow card) 8'; G.Malakyan (yellow card) 25'; K.Kouakou 34'; A.Muradyan (yellow card) 85'	Report	A.Grigoryan (yellow card) 25'; Yedigaryan 51'; Héber 54'	Stadium: Gyumri City Stadium; Attendance: 1,000; Referee: Suren Baliyan

26 September 2015 8	Gandzasar Kapan	1 – 1	Shirak	Kapan
16:00 (UTC+4)	Memović 34' (yellow card) 59'	Report	A.Hovhannisyan (yellow card) 48'; Aleksanyan (yellow card) 60'; K.Kouakou (yellow card) 64'; G.Hovhannisyan 90+5'	Stadium: Gandzasar Stadium; Attendance: 2,000; Referee: Suren Baliyan

4 October 2015 9	Ulisses	0 – 1	Shirak	Yerevan
18:00 (UTC+4)	G.Katchkatchishvili (yellow card) 78'; D.Berisha (yellow card) 83'	Report	Hakobyan 55'; A.Barikyan (yellow card) 80'	Stadium: Vazgen Sargsyan Republican Stadium; Attendance: 250; Referee: Edgar Sahakyan

17 October 2015 10	Mika	0 – 1	Shirak	Yerevan
14:00 (UTC+4)	Toboyev (yellow card) 13'; Chistyakov (yellow card) 24'	Report	K.Kouakou 44' (yellow card) 72'; G.Hovhannisyan (yellow card) 58'; Hakobyan (yellow card) 73'; E.Panosyan (yellow card) 75'; A.Hovhannisyan (yellow card) 90+3'	Stadium: Mika Stadium; Attendance: 500; Referee: Suren Baliyan

24 October 2015 11	Shirak	0 – 2	Pyunik	Gyumri
15:00 (UTC+4)	Hakobyan (yellow card) 42'; G.Malakyan (yellow card) 81'	Report	V.Pogosyan 55'; Voskanyan (yellow card) 62'; V.Satumyan (yellow card) 76' (goal) 78'	Stadium: Gyumri City Stadium; Attendance: 800; Referee: Suren Baliyan

31 October 2015 12	Banants	1 – 1	Shirak	Yerevan
15:00 (UTC+4)	Va.Ayvazyan (yellow card) 60'; Laércio 64'; Z.Margaryan (yellow card) 90+2'	Report	A.Barikyan (yellow card) 10'; K.Kouakou 26'	Stadium: Banants Stadium; Attendance: 400; Referee: Arman Alaberkyan

8 November 2015 13	Shirak	0 – 1	Ararat Yerevan	Gyumri
15:00 (UTC+4)	Hakobyan (yellow card) 47'; A.Muradyan (yellow card) 85'; Vi.Ayvazyan (yellow card) 90'	Report	Kone (yellow card) 28'; B.Hovhannisyan 44'; O.Kaina (yellow card) 50'; N.Grigoryan (yellow card) 85'	Stadium: Gyumri City Stadium; Attendance: 700; Referee: Suren Baliyan

21 November 2015 14	Alashkert	2 – 0	Shirak	Yerevan
14:00 (UTC+4)	Héber 24'; A.Hovsepyan 31'; Minasyan (yellow card) 77'; Muradyan (yellow card) 90+1'	Report	K.Kouakou (yellow card) 22'; G.Malakyan (yellow card) 43'	Stadium: Alashkert Stadium; Attendance: 300; Referee: Artur Simonyan

29 November 2015 15	Shirak	2 – 1	Gandzasar Kapan	Gyumri
15:00 (UTC+4)	Hakobyan 11'; G.Hovhannisyan (yellow card) 73'; Stamenković (yellow card) 82'; Vi.Ayvazyan 85'	Report	Memović (yellow card) 21'; G.Harutyunyan 82'	Stadium: Gyumri City Stadium; Attendance: 400; Referee: Zaven Hovhannisyan

3 March 2016 16	Ulisses	0 – 3	Shirak	Yerevan
16:00 (UTC+4)		Report		Stadium: Vazgen Sargsyan Republican Stadium
Note: Match awarded to Shirak 3-0 after Ulisses were expelled from the league in February 2016.

12 March 2016 17	Shirak	0 – 1	Mika	Gyumri
14:00 (UTC+4)	Mikaelyan (yellow card) 23'; Darbinyan (yellow card) 54'	Report	Chakhvashvili (yellow card) 25'; Gorelishvili 78'	Stadium: Gyumri City Stadium; Attendance: 500; Referee: Zaven Hovhannisyan

20 March 2016 18	Pyunik	1 – 1	Shirak	Yerevan
16:00 (UTC+4)	R.Hakobyan (yellow card) 32'; Manoyan 88'	Report	Darbinyan (yellow card) 43'; K.Kouakou (yellow card) 64'; Hovsepyan 65'; A.Davoyan (yellow card) 82'	Stadium: Yerevan Football Academy Stadium; Attendance: 350; Referee: Suren Baliyan

2 April 2016 20	Ararat Yerevan	1 – 1	Shirak	Yerevan
14:00 (UTC+4)	G.Nranyan (yellow card) 47' de la Fuente 78'	Report	A.Hovhannisyan (yellow card) 12'; Diarrassouba 70'; Stošković (yellow card) 90'	Stadium: Hrazdan Stadium; Attendance: 200; Referee: Artur Simonyan

6 April 2016 19	Shirak	3 – 1	Banants	Gyumri
16:00 (UTC+4)	K.Kouakou 34'; Darbinyan (yellow card) 41'; Stošković 45'; Stamenković (yellow card) 81'; Vi.Ayvazyan 90'	Report	Va.Ayvazyan (yellow card) 41' (yellow-red card) 70'; P.Avetisyan 49'; Badoyan (yellow card) 59'	Stadium: Gyumri City Stadium; Attendance: 600; Referee: Suren Baliyan

9 April 2016 21	Shirak	2 – 1	Alashkert	Gyumri
16:00 (UTC+4)	Diarrassouba 73', 81'; K.Kouakou (yellow card) 83'; A.Hovhannisyan (yellow card) 90+1'	Report	M.Manasyan 90+2'	Stadium: Gyumri City Stadium; Attendance: 500; Referee: Artur Simonyan

16 April 2016 22	Gandzasar Kapan	0 – 0	Shirak	Kapan
16:00 (UTC+4)	Ale.Petrosyan (yellow card) 27'; Memović (yellow card) 49'; A.Khachatryan (yellow card) 85'	Report	Darbinyan (yellow card) 85'	Stadium: Gandzasar Stadium; Attendance: 1,000; Referee: Zaven Hovhannisyan

24 April 2016 23	Shirak	3 – 0	Ulisses	Gyumri
17:00 (UTC+4)		Report		Stadium: Gyumri City Stadium
Note: Match awarded to Shirak 3-0 after Ulisses were expelled from the league in February 2016.

30 April 2016 24	Mika	1 – 4	Shirak	Yerevan
17:00 (UTC+4)	Čmajčanin 34'; A.Karapetyan (yellow card) 39'; A.Kocharyan (yellow card) 86'	Report	K.Kouakou 1'; Stošković 19' (yellow card) 19'; Aleksanyan 32' (yellow card) 64'; Mikaelyan (yellow card) 77'; Hovsepyan 84'	Stadium: Mika Stadium; Attendance: 350; Referee: Artur Safaryan

8 May 2016 25	Shirak	1 – 1	Pyunik	Gyumri
17:00 (UTC+4)	A.Hovhannisyan (yellow card) 45'; Diarrassouba 62'; Darbinyan (yellow card) 74'; K.Kouakou (yellow card) 81'; M.Kaba (yellow card) 87'	Report	Yuspashyan (yellow card) 44'; V.Pogosyan 79'	Stadium: Gyumri City Stadium; Attendance: 1,500; Referee: Suren Baliyan

14 May 2016 26	Banants	0 – 1	Shirak	Yerevan
17:00 (UTC+4)	V.Drobarov (yellow card) 30'; Laércio (yellow card) 51'; Kachmazov (yellow card) 57' (yellow-red card) 58'; Torrejón (yellow card) 87'	Report	A.Hovhannisyan 24' (o.g.); Stošković (yellow card) 31'; Aleksanyan (yellow card) 54'; Arreola (yellow card) 74'; Darbinyan (yellow card) 85'; A.Khachatryan (yellow card) 88'	Stadium: Banants Stadium; Attendance: 1,000; Referee: Artur Simonyan

18 May 2016 28	Alashkert	2 – 3	Shirak	Yerevan
17:00 (UTC+4)	A.Grigoryan (yellow card) 34'; A.Avagyan 55' (yellow card) 90+4'; R.Ghazaryan (yellow card) 73'; Minasyan 85' (yellow card) 89'	Report	Diarrassouba 13'; Arreola (yellow card) 38'; M.Kaba (yellow card) 48'; Minasyan 72' (o.g.); Hovsepyan (yellow card) 75'; A.Davoyan (yellow card) 77'; Vi.Ayvazyan 90+4'	Stadium: Alashkert Stadium; Attendance: 1,000; Referee: Zaven Hovhannisyan

22 May 2016 27	Shirak	2 – 1	Ararat Yerevan	Gyumri
17:00 (UTC+4)	K.Kouakou (yellow card) 41'; A.Hovhannisyan 60'; G.Hovhannisyan 67'; M.Kaba (yellow card) 81'	Report	B.Hovhannisyan 57'; N.Grigoryan (yellow card) 90+4'	Stadium: Gyumri City Stadium; Attendance: 700; Referee: Artur Simonyan

==== Table ====
Pos	Team	Pld	W	D	L	GF	GA	GD	Pts	Qualification or relegation
1	Alashkert (C)	28	16	7	5	50	24	+26	55	Qualification for the Champions League first qualifying round
2	Shirak	28	15	7	6	41	27	+14	52	Qualification for the Europa League first qualifying round
3	Pyunik	28	13	9	6	44	21	+23	48	Qualification for the Europa League first qualifying round
4	Gandzasar Kapan	28	11	12	5	35	27	+8	45	
5	Ararat Yerevan	28	9	10	9	28	31	−3	37	

Source: Football Federation of Armenia, Soccerway
Rules for classification: 1) Points; 2) Play-off (only if deciding champion); 3) Matches won; 4) Head-to-head points; 5) Head-to-head matches won; 6) Head-to-head goal difference; 7) Head-to-head goals scored; 8) Head-to-head away goals scored; 9) Goal difference; 10) Goals scored.
(C) Champions

=== Armenian Cup ===
21 October 2015 Quarterfinal 1st leg	Mika	1 – 1	Shirak	Yerevan
15:00 (UTC+4)	N.Balayan 27'; A.Belomitsev (yellow card) 36'; Kvekveskiri (red card) 62'; Chistyakov (yellow card) 64'	Report	M.Kaba 63'	Stadium: Mika Stadium; Attendance: 50; Referee: Artur Simonyan

4 November 2015 Quarterfinal 2nd leg	Shirak	0 – 1 (1 – 2 agg.)	Mika	Gyumri
15:00 (UTC+4)	K.Kouakou (yellow card) 45'; M.Kaba (yellow card) 86'	Report	A.Grigoryan 2'; Kvekveskiri (yellow card) 29'	Stadium: Gyumri City Stadium; Attendance: 500; Referee: Zaven Hovhannisyan

=== UEFA Europa League ===
==== Qualifying rounds ====
2 July 2015 First qualifying round 1st leg	Shirak (Armenia)	2 – 0	(Bosnia and Herzegovina) Zrinjski Mostar	Gyumri, Armenia
18:30 (UTC+4)	Bougouhi 18', 67'; A.Davoyan (yellow card) 64'; Davtyan (yellow card) 90'	Report	Filipović (yellow card) 16'; Stojkić (yellow card) 36'; M.Muminović (yellow card) 44'	Stadium: Gyumri City Stadium; Attendance: 2,774; Referee: Charalampos Kalogeropoulos (Greece)

9 July 2015 First qualifying round 2nd leg	Zrinjski Mostar (Bosnia and Herzegovina)	2 – 1 (2 – 3 agg.)	(Armenia) Shirak	Mostar, Bosnia and Herzegovina
21:30 (UTC+6)	O.Todorović (yellow card) 66'; Mešanović 80' (pen.); Filipović 86'; A.Radeljić (yellow card) 90+3'	Report	G.Hovhannisyan (yellow card) 80'; E.Malakyan (yellow card) 82'; Bougouhi 90+8'	Stadium: Stadion pod Bijelim Brijegom; Attendance: 4,800; Referee: Zbynek Proske (Czech Republic)

16 July 2015 Second qualifying round 1st leg	AIK (Sweden)	2 – 0	(Armenia) Shirak	Stockholm, Sweden
21:00 (UTC+4)	Karlsson (yellow card) 9'; Goitom 29', 83' (pen.) (yellow card) 63'; Bangura (yellow card) 62'	Report	A.Hovhannisyan (yellow card) 7' (yellow-red card) 69'; Aleksanyan (yellow card) 53'; Stamenković (yellow card) 54'; G.Malakyan (yellow card) 62' (yellow-red card) 80'; G.Hovhannisyan (yellow card) 83'; Bougouhi (yellow card) 84'; A.Barikyan (red card) 85'	Stadium: Tele2 Arena; Attendance: 7,315; Referee: Vladimir Vnuk (Slovakia)
Note: AIK played their second qualifying round home match at Tele2 Arena, Stockholm, instead of their regular stadium Friends Arena, Solna, as the arena was booked for an AC/DC concert.

23 July 2015 Second qualifying round 2nd leg	Shirak (Armenia)	0 – 2 (0 – 4 agg.)	(Sweden) AIK	Gyumri, Armenia
23:15 (UTC+6)	Bougouhi (yellow card) 68'; Davtyan (yellow card) 79'; Mikaelyan (yellow card) 81'	Report	Goitom 14'; Ishizaki 25'; Ofori (yellow card) 58'; Eliasson (yellow card) 81'	Stadium: Gyumri City Stadium; Attendance: 2,820; Referee: Sándor Andó-Szabó (Hungary)

== Statistics ==
As of match played 22 May 2016

=== Appearances and goals ===
No.	Pos	Nat	Player	Total		Premier League		Armenian Cup		UEFA Europa League	
No.	Pos	Nat	Player	Apps	Goals	Apps	Goals	Apps	Goals	Apps	Goals
1	GK	(Armenia) ARM	Norayr Abrahamyan	4	0	3	0	1	0	0	0
2	DF	(Armenia) ARM	Arman Hovhannisyan	31	1	26	1	2	0	3	0
3	DF	(Armenia) ARM	Artyom Mikaelyan	13	0	9+2	0	1	0	1	0
6	MF	(Ivory Coast) CIV	Mohamed Kaba	28	2	21+4	1	1+1	1	0+1	0
7	FW	(Armenia) ARM	Viulen Ayvazyan	20	5	4+11	5	1+1	0	0+3	0
8	MF	(Armenia) ARM	Rumyan Hovsepyan	10	3	7+3	3	0	0	0	0
9	FW	(Ivory Coast) CIV	Konan Kouakou	21	6	19	6	1+1	0	0	0
10	MF	(Armenia) ARM	Davit Hakobyan	32	5	25+1	5	2	0	4	0
11	FW	(Armenia) ARM	Edvard Panosyan	14	0	7+5	0	2	0	0	0
14	DF	(Armenia) ARM	Arman Tadevosyan	7	0	4+2	0	1	0	0	0
15	MF	(Armenia) ARM	Karen Aleksanyan	21	1	14+2	1	2	0	2+1	0
16	MF	(Armenia) ARM	Arman Aslanyan	7	0	1+6	0	0	0	0	0
18	FW	(Armenia) ARM	Aram Muradyan	19	0	1+14	0	1+1	0	0+2	0
19	MF	(Nigeria) NGR	Solomon Udo	10	0	5+5	0	0	0	0	0
20	DF	(Serbia) SRB	Miloš Stamenković	23	0	18	0	1	0	4	0
21	DF	(Armenia) ARM	Gevorg Hovhannisyan	31	1	26	1	1	0	4	0
23	DF	(Armenia) ARM	Robert Darbinyan	8	0	6+2	0	0	0	0	0
24	FW	(United States) USA	Eder Arreola	10	0	5+5	0	0	0	0	0
25	DF	(Armenia) ARM	Aghvan Davoyan	28	0	18+4	0	2	0	4	0
35	MF	(Armenia) ARM	Shahen Shahinyan	1	0	0+1	0	0	0	0	0
36	FW	(Ivory Coast) CIV	Drissa Diarrassouba	15	5	11	5	0	0	4	0
41	MF	(Armenia) ARM	Vahan Bichakhchyan	1	0	0+1	0	0	0	0	0
55	GK	(Armenia) ARM	Armen Khachatryan	11	0	11	0	0	0	0	0
77	MF	(Serbia) SRB	Nemanja Stošković	9	2	6+3	2	0	0	0	0
Players who left Shirak during the season:
5	MF	(Armenia) ARM	Tigran Davtyan	4	0	0	0	0	0	3+1	0
8	MF	(Armenia) ARM	Gor Malakyan	18	1	13	1	1+1	0	3	0
9	FW	(Ivory Coast) CIV	Jean-Jacques Bougouhi	5	4	1	1	0	0	4	3
12	MF	(Armenia) ARM	Andranik Barikyan	13	0	5+4	0	1	0	0+3	0
13	GK	(Armenia) ARM	Gor Elyazyan	13	0	12	0	1	0	0	0
22	MF	(Armenia) ARM	Edgar Malakyan	14	1	8+1	1	0+1	0	4	0
45	GK	(Russia) RUS	Vsevolod Yermakov	4	0	0	0	0	0	4	0

=== Goal scorers ===
Place	Position	Nation	Number	Name	Premier League	Armenian Cup	UEFA Europa League	Total
1	FW	(Ivory Coast)	9	Konan Kouakou	6	0	0	6
2	MF	(Armenia)	10	Davit Hakobyan	5	0	0	5
2	FW	(Armenia)	7	Viulen Ayvazyan	5	0	0	5
2	FW	(Ivory Coast)	36	Drissa Diarrassouba	5	0	0	5
5	FW	(Ivory Coast)	9	Jean-Jacques Bougouhi	1	0	3	4
6	MF	(Armenia)	8	Rumyan Hovsepyan	3	0	0	3
6				Own goal	3	0	0	3
8	MF	(Serbia)	77	Nemanja Stošković	2	0	0	2
9	DF	(Armenia)	8	Gor Malakyan	1	0	0	1
9	MF	(Armenia)	22	Edgar Malakyan	1	0	0	1
9	MF	(Armenia)	15	Karen Aleksanyan	1	0	0	1
9	DF	(Armenia)	2	Arman Hovhannisyan	1	0	0	1
9	MF	(Ivory Coast)	6	Mohamed Kaba	0	1	0	1
9	DF	(Armenia)	21	Gevorg Hovhannisyan	1	0	0	1
				Awarded	6	0	0	6
				TOTALS	41	1	3	45

=== Clean sheets ===
Place	Position	Nation	Number	Name	Premier League	Armenian Cup	UEFA Europa League	Total
1	GK	(Armenia)	13	Gor Elyazyan	4	0	0	4
2	GK	(Armenia)	55	Armen Khachatryan	2	0	0	2
3	GK	(Russia)	45	Vsevolod Yermakov	0	0	1	1
				TOTALS	6	0	1	7

=== Disciplinary record ===
Number	Nation	Position	Name	Premier League		Armenian Cup		UEFA Europa League		Total	
Number	Nation	Position	Name	Yellow card	Red card	Yellow card	Red card	Yellow card	Red card	Yellow card	Red card
2	(Armenia)	DF	Arman Hovhannisyan	6	0	0	0	3	1	9	1
3	(Armenia)	DF	Artyom Mikaelyan	2	0	0	0	1	0	3	0
6	(Ivory Coast)	MF	Mohamed Kaba	3	0	1	0	0	0	4	0
7	(Armenia)	FW	Viulen Ayvazyan	1	0	0	0	0	0	1	0
8	(Armenia)	MF	Rumyan Hovsepyan	1	0	0	0	0	0	1	0
9	(Ivory Coast)	FW	Konan Kouakou	7	0	1	0	0	0	8	0
10	(Armenia)	MF	Davit Hakobyan	4	0	0	0	0	0	4	0
11	(Armenia)	FW	Edvard Panosyan	2	0	0	0	0	0	2	0
15	(Armenia)	MF	Karen Aleksanyan	5	0	0	0	1	0	6	0
18	(Armenia)	FW	Aram Muradyan	3	0	0	0	0	0	3	0
20	(Serbia)	DF	Miloš Stamenković	4	0	0	0	1	0	5	0
21	(Armenia)	DF	Gevorg Hovhannisyan	5	0	0	0	1	0	6	0
23	(Armenia)	DF	Robert Darbinyan	6	0	0	0	0	0	6	0
24	(United States)	FW	Eder Arreola	2	0	0	0	0	0	2	0
25	(Armenia)	DF	Aghvan Davoyan	3	0	0	0	1	0	4	0
55	(Armenia)	GK	Armen Khachatryan	1	0	0	0	0	0	1	0
77	(Serbia)	MF	Nemanja Stošković	3	0	0	0	0	0	3	0
Players who left Shirak during the season:
5	(Armenia)	DF	Tigran Davtyan	0	0	0	0	2	0	2	0
8	(Armenia)	MF	Gor Malakyan	4	0	0	0	2	1	6	1
9	(Ivory Coast)	FW	Jean-Jacques Bougouhi	0	0	0	0	2	0	2	0
12	(Armenia)	MF	Andranik Barikyan	3	0	0	0	0	1	3	1
13	(Armenia)	GK	Gor Elyazyan	1	0	0	0	0	0	1	0
22	(Armenia)	MF	Edgar Malakyan	1	0	0	0	1	0	2	0
			TOTALS	67	0	2	0	15	3	84	3
