= 2012–13 Armenian Premier League =

Armenian Premier League
- Season: 2012–13
- Champions: Shirak
- Champions League: Shirak
- Europa League: Mika; Gandzasar; Pyunik
- Matches: 136
- Goals: 345 (2.54 per match)
- Top goalscorer: Norayr Gyozalyan (21 goals)
- Biggest home win: Pyunik 6–0 Ararat Yerevan
- Biggest away win: Ararat Yerevan 0–3 Mika; Banants 2–5 Impuls; Banants 0–3 Pyunik
- Highest scoring: Banants 2–5 Impuls

The 2012–13 Armenian Premier League season was the twenty-first since its establishment. The season began on 24 March 2012 and ended on 18 May 2013, with two scheduled breaks between 2–27 July 2012 and 3 December 2012 – 8 March 2013. Ulisses are the defending champions, having won their first league title last season.

The league switched from a year-round to a fall-spring schedule.

The title was won by Shirak.

== Competition changes ==
The league changed its competition mode from that of a calendar year to a fall-spring schedule. As a consequence, this season will be longer than usual; every team will play six times against each other team, three times at home and three times away.

== Teams ==
Location of teams in the 2012–13 Armenian Premier League

Because all of the club's in last year's First League competition were reserve teams of the Premier League clubs, there was no promotion or relegation between the two for this season. Therefore, the league membership has not changed from last year's competition.

| Club | Location | Stadium | Capacity |
|---|---|---|---|
| Ararat Yerevan | Yerevan | City Stadium (Abovyan) | 3,946 |
| Banants | Yerevan | Banants Stadium | 5,010 |
| Gandzasar | Kapan | Gandzasar Stadium | 3,500 |
| Impuls | Dilijan | Ayg Stadium (Ararat) | 1,280 |
| Mika | Yerevan | Mika Stadium | 7,250 |
| Pyunik | Yerevan | Republican Stadium (until March 2013); Football Academy Stadium (April 2013 & onwards) | 14,403; 1,428 |
| Shirak | Gyumri | Gyumri City Stadium | 2,844 |
| Ulisses | Yerevan | Republican Stadium | 14,403 |

=== Personnel and sponsorship ===
| Team | Chairman | Head coach | Captain | Kit manufacturer | Shirt sponsor |
|---|---|---|---|---|---|
| Ararat Yerevan | (Switzerland) Hrach Kaprielyan | (Armenia) Albert Safaryan | (Armenia) Gorik Khachatryan | Jako | |
| Banants | (Armenia) Sargis Israelyan | (Armenia) Rafael Nazaryan | (Armenia) Ararat Arakelyan | Umbro | |
| Gandzasar | (Armenia) Maksim Hakobyan | (Armenia) Abraham Khashmanyan | (Armenia) Armen Tatintsyan | Joma | |
| Impuls | (Armenia) Tigran Hakobyan | (Armenia) Armen Gyulbudaghyants | (Armenia) Narek Davtyan | Lotto | |
| Mika | (Armenia) Carlos Khazaryan | (Slovakia) Zsolt Hornyák | (Armenia) Aghvan Mkrtchyan | Umbro | Armavia |
| Pyunik | (Armenia) Karen Harutyunyan | (Armenia) Suren Chakhalyan | (Armenia) David Manoyan | Hummel | Armenian Development Bank |
| Shirak | (Armenia) Arman Sahakyan | (Armenia) Vardan Bichakhchyan | (Armenia) Tigran Davtyan | Kappa | Sovrano |
| Ulisses | (Armenia) Artak Harutyunyan | (Armenia) Sevada Arzumanyan | (Armenia) David Grigoryan | Lotto | VivaCell MTS |

=== Managerial changes ===
| Team | Outgoing manager | Manner of departure | Date of vacancy | Position in table | Incoming manager | Date of appointment |

== League table ==
| Pos | Team | Pld | W | D | L | GF | GA | GD | Pts | Qualification |
|---|---|---|---|---|---|---|---|---|---|---|
| 1 | Shirak (C) | 42 | 26 | 10 | 6 | 70 | 38 | +32 | 88 | Qualification for the Champions League first qualifying round |
| 2 | Mika | 42 | 24 | 7 | 11 | 57 | 39 | +18 | 79 | Qualification for the Europa League first qualifying round (Note: Pyunik, as winners of 2012–13 Armenian Cup, qualify for the first qualifying round of the UEFA Europa League.) |
| 3 | Gandzasar Kapan | 42 | 18 | 13 | 11 | 48 | 37 | +11 | 67 | Qualification for the Europa League first qualifying round |
| 4 | Pyunik | 42 | 19 | 6 | 17 | 67 | 51 | +16 | 63 | Qualification for the Europa League first qualifying round |
| 5 | Impuls | 42 | 18 | 6 | 18 | 66 | 65 | +1 | 60 | Team disbanded after the season (Note: Impuls FC decided not to participate in 2013–14 Armenian Premier League competition, as the team was dissolved by the decision of the owners.) |
| 6 | Ulisses | 42 | 11 | 12 | 19 | 41 | 50 | −9 | 45 | |
| 7 | Ararat Yerevan | 42 | 9 | 6 | 27 | 27 | 70 | −43 | 33 | |
| 8 | Banants (Note: Executive committee of the Football Federation of Armenia decided to allow Banants to participate in the Premier League next season despite the fact that FC Banants took the last place in the tournament and was supposed to leave it.) | 42 | 5 | 16 | 21 | 37 | 64 | −27 | 31 | |

Source: Football Federation of Armenia
Rules for classification: 1) points; 2) goal difference; 3) number of goals scored.
(C) Champions

== Results ==
Matches 1–14
| Home \ Away | ARA | BAN | GAN | IMP | MIK | PYU | SHI | ULI |
|---|---|---|---|---|---|---|---|---|
| Ararat Yerevan | | 1–3 | 0–1 | 0–2 | 0–3 | 2–3 | 1–2 | 2–1 |
| Banants | 2–0 | | 0–1 | 1–2 | 0–1 | 1–1 | 3–0 | 2–3 |
| Gandzasar Kapan | 1–0 | 3–0 | | 0–1 | 2–3 | 1–0 | 1–2 | 0–1 |
| Impulse | 4–1 | 1–1 | 1–1 | | 1–2 | 3–0 | 0–2 | 1–0 |
| Mika | 3–0 | 2–1 | 0–2 | 4–2 | | 3–2 | 2–1 | 3–1 |
| Pyunik | 6–0 | 4–0 | 0–1 | 1–3 | 0–0 | | 1–3 | 4–2 |
| Shirak | 4–0 | 2–1 | 2–1 | 3–1 | 1–1 | 0–1 | | 1–0 |
| Ulisses | 3–1 | 0–0 | 0–0 | 4–0 | 1–2 | 1–1 | 1–1 | |

Source: Football Federation of Armenia
Legend: Blue = home team win; Yellow = draw; Red = away team win.

Matches 15–28
| Home \ Away | ARA | BAN | GAN | IMP | MIK | PYU | SHI | ULI |
|---|---|---|---|---|---|---|---|---|
| Ararat Yerevan | | 1–0 | 3–1 | 1–0 | 1–0 | 0–2 | 0–2 | 1–2 |
| Banants | 1–1 | | 0–0 | 2–5 | 1–1 | 0–3 | 1–1 | 1–1 |
| Gandzasar Kapan | 0–0 | 1–1 | | 3–0 | 3–2 | 2–0 | 1–1 | 0–1 |
| Impulse | 1–2 | 2–2 | 3–0 | | 2–1 | 2–4 | 3–1 | 2–0 |
| Mika | 1–0 | 1–0 | 0–0 | 2–2 | | 2–1 | 3–1 | 1–0 |
| Pyunik | 1–0 | 1–0 | 4–2 | 1–2 | 0–1 | | 1–2 | 3–1 |
| Shirak | 3–2 | 2–1 | 2–0 | 1–1 | 2–0 | 2–1 | | 2–1 |
| Ulisses | 0–0 | 2–2 | 0–2 | 2–1 | 1–2 | 3–0 | 0–2 | |

Source: Football Federation of Armenia
Legend: Blue = home team win; Yellow = draw; Red = away team win.

Matches 29–42
| Home \ Away | ARA | BAN | GAN | IMP | MIK | PYU | SHI | ULI |
|---|---|---|---|---|---|---|---|---|
| Ararat Yerevan | | 1–1 | 2–1 | 1–2 | 1–0 | 1–3 | 0–1 | 0–0 |
| Banants | 0–0 | | 1–1 | 2–3 | 2–1 | 2–0 | 2–2 | 0–2 |
| Gandzasar Kapan | 2–0 | 2–0 | | 2–1 | 1–0 | 1–1 | 0–0 | 1–0 |
| Impulse | 0–1 | 1–0 | 1–2 | | 1–1 | 1–0 | 0–2 | 2–0 |
| Mika | 1–0 | 2–0 | 1–2 | 1–0 | | 1–0 | 0–0 | 2–0 |
| Pyunik | 2–0 | 4–0 | 1–1 | 3–2 | 2–0 | | 0–1 | 3–1 |
| Shirak | 3–1 | 2–0 | 2–2 | 4–3 | 3–0 | 0–1 | | 2–0 |
| Ulisses | 1–0 | 0–0 | 0–0 | 4–1 | 0–1 | 1–1 | 0–0 | |

Source: Football Federation of Armenia
Legend: Blue = home team win; Yellow = draw; Red = away team win.

== Season statistics ==
=== Top scorers ===
Updated through matches played on 12 April 2013.

| Rank | Player | Club | Goals |
|---|---|---|---|
| 1 | (Armenia) Norayr Gyozalyan | Impuls | 21 |
| 2 | (Ivory Coast) Ismaël Béko Fofana | Shirak | 14 |
| 2 | (Armenia) Simon Muradyan | Mika | 14 |
| 4 | (Senegal) Yoro Lamine Ly | Shirak | 13 |
| 5 | (Armenia) Viulen Ayvazyan | Pyunik | 11 |
| 5 | (Armenia) Andranik Barikyan | Shirak | 11 |
| 7 | (Armenia) Arsen Balabekyan | Ulisses | 10 |
| 8 | (Armenia) Kamo Hovhannisyan | Pyunik | 9 |
| 8 | (Brazil) Diego Lomba | Gandzasar | 9 |
| 10 | (North Macedonia) Filip Timov | Impuls | 8 |
