= 2011 Armenian Premier League =

Armenian Premier League
- Season: 2011
- Champions: Ulisses; 1st title
- Relegated: none
- Champions League: Ulisses
- Europa League: Shirak; Pyunik; Gandzasar
- Matches: 112
- Goals: 258 (2.3 per match)
- Top goalscorer: Bruno Correa (16 goals)
- Biggest home win: Gandzasar 5-0 Ararat Yerevan; Ulisses 5-0 Ararat Yerevan
- Biggest away win: Ararat Yerevan 0-5 Banants
- Highest scoring: Banants 3-4 Pyunik
- Longest winning run: Banants, Ulisses (5 games each)
- Longest unbeaten run: Ulisses (10 games)
- Longest winless run: Ararat Yerevan (14 games)
- Longest losing run: Ararat Yerevan (12 games)

The 2011 Armenian Premier League football season was the twentieth since its establishment. The season began in March 2011 and ended in November 2011. FC Pyunik were the defending champions, having won their thirteenth championship last season, their tenth in a row.

== Teams ==
Despite the fact that Shirak finished last season in eighth and last place, it was decided that they should remain in the top flight for another season. However, Kilikia decided not to participate in this year's Armenian Premier League competition, citing financial difficulties as a reason.

Kilikia FC was replaced by 2010 Armenian First League champions Ararat Yerevan.

Location of teams in the 2011 Armenian Premier League

Club	Location	Stadium	Capacity
Ararat Yerevan	Yerevan	Hrazdan Stadium	54,208
Banants	Yerevan	Banants Stadium	5,010
Gandzasar	Kapan	Gandzasar Stadium	3,500
Impuls	Dilijan	Arnar Stadium (Ijevan)^{1}	2,100
Mika	Yerevan	Mika Stadium	7,250
Pyunik	Yerevan	Republican Stadium	14,403
Shirak	Gyumri	Arnar Stadium (Ijevan)^{2}	2,844
Ulisses	Yerevan	Hrazdan Stadium	54,208

- ^{1}Impuls played at the Arnar Stadium, Ijevan, due to the rebuilding of their Dilijan City Stadium, Dilijan.
- ^{1}Shirak played at the Arnar Stadium, Ijevan, due to the rebuilding of their Gyumri City Stadium, Gyumri.

== League table ==
Pos	Team	Pld	W	D	L	GF	GA	GD	Pts	Qualification
1	Ulisses (C)	28	15	8	5	38	22	+16	53	Qualification for the Champions League second qualifying round
2	Pyunik	28	12	10	6	33	28	+5	46	Qualification for the Europa League first qualifying round
3	Gandzasar Kapan	28	12	10	6	31	18	+13	46	Qualification for the Europa League first qualifying round
4	Banants	28	12	8	8	42	30	+12	44	
5	Mika	28	12	8	8	36	25	+11	44	
6	Impulse	28	10	7	11	37	36	+1	37	
7	Shirak	28	6	7	15	27	42	−15	25	Qualification for the Europa League first qualifying round (Note: Winners of 2011–12 Armenian Cup qualified for the first qualifying round of the UEFA Europa League.)
8	Ararat Yerevan	28	2	4	22	14	57	−43	10	

Rules for classification: 1) points; 2) goal difference; 3) number of goals scored.
(C) Champions

== Results ==
The league will be played in four stages. The teams will play four times with each other, twice at home and twice away, for a total of 28 matches per team.

=== First half of season ===
Home \ Away	ARA	BAN	GAN	IMP	MIK	PYU	SHI	ULI
Ararat Yerevan		1–1	0–1	2–1	0–3	1–4	2–1	1–1
Banants	2–1		0–1	2–1	2–2	3–4	2–2	1–3
Gandzasar Kapan	5–0	2–0		0–0	1–0	1–3	1–0	0–0
Impulse	2–0	1–0	2–2		1–0	0–1	2–1	0–1
Mika	2–1	0–0	0–1	3–2		0–1	0–0	2–3
Pyunik	1–0	1–1	1–1	2–2	0–1		1–0	3–1
Shirak	1–1	1–1	0–2	2–1	1–0	2–0		1–3
Ulisses	3–0	1–0	0–0	0–1	1–2	1–0	1–0	

Source: ffa.am
Legend: Blue = home team win; Yellow = draw; Red = away team win.

=== Second half of season ===
Home \ Away	ARA	BAN	GAN	IMP	MIK	PYU	SHI	ULI
Ararat Yerevan		0–5	0–1	0–2	1–1	0–1	1–3	1–2
Banants	1–0		0–0	3–2	3–1	3–0	3–1	2–1
Gandzasar Kapan	2–0	0–1		1–0	2–2	1–2	4–0	0–1
Impulse	2–1	3–1	1–1		0–2	1–1	2–1	1–1
Mika	2–0	0–0	1–0	2–1		0–0	4–1	0–1
Pyunik	1–0	0–3	1–1	2–2	1–2		1–0	0–0
Shirak	1–0	0–2	1–0	2–3	1–1	0–0		0–2
Ulisses	5–0	1–0	0–0	2–1	0–3	1–1	2–2	

Source: ffa.am
Legend: Blue = home team win; Yellow = draw; Red = away team win.

== Top goalscorers ==
Source: ffa.am

Rank	Scorer	Team	Goals
1	(Brazil) Bruno Correa	Banants	16
2	(Armenia) Narek Beglaryan	Mika	11
3	(Armenia) Andranik Barikyan	Shirak	10
4	(Armenia) Zaven Badoyan	Impuls	8
4	(Georgia (country)) Georgi Krasovski	Ulisses	8
4	(Armenia) Edgar Manucharyan	Pyunik	8
7	(Armenia) Artyom Adamyan	Ulisses	7
7	(Armenia) Norayr Gyozalyan	Banants, Impuls	7
9	(Brazil) Beto	Banants	6
9	(Armenia) Hovhannes Hovhannisyan	Pyunik	6
9	(Armenia) Marcos Pizzelli	Pyunik	6

== Attendances ==
#	Club	Average
1	Gandzasar	2,207
2	Mika	807
3	Pyunik	687
4	Banants	582
5	Ulisses	402
6	Impuls	357
7	Shirak	286
8	Ararat	207

== See also ==
- 2011 Armenian First League
- 2011 Armenian Cup
