= Ihar Logvinaw =

Belarusian footballer and coach

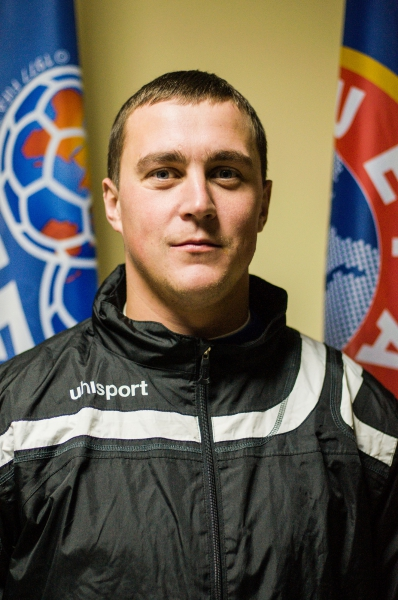

Personal information
- Date of birth: 23 August 1983 (age 43)
- Place of birth: Minsk, Belarusian SSR
- Height: 1.88 m (6 ft 2 in)
- Position: Goalkeeper

Team information
- Current team: Mashuk-KMV Pyatigorsk (assistant manager)

Youth career
- 2001–2003: Torpedo-SKA Minsk

Senior career*
Years	Team	Apps	(Gls)
2003	Darida Minsk Raion	7	(0)
2004	Zvezda-VA-BGU Minsk	11	(0)
2004–2006	Shakhtyor Soligorsk	53	(0)
2006–2007	Illichivets Mariupol	0	(0)
2007–2009	Gomel	32	(0)
2009	Granit Mikashevichi	13	(0)
2010	Belshina Bobruisk	26	(0)
2011	Shirak	27	(0)
2012	Minsk	12	(0)
2013	Gomel	1	(0)
2013–2014	Isloch Minsk Raion	29	(0)
2015–2016	Viktoriya Maryina Gorka	22	(0)

International career
2002–2005	Belarus U21	9	(0)

Managerial career
- 2017–: Mashuk-KMV Pyatigorsk (assistant)
- 2020–2021: Mashuk-KMV Pyatigorsk (caretaker)
- * Club domestic league appearances and goals

Ihar Logvinaw (Belarusian: Ігар Логвінаў; Russian: Игорь Логвинов; born 23 August 1983) is a Belarusian professional football coach and a former player. He works as an assistant manager with FC Mashuk-KMV Pyatigorsk.

== Career ==
=== Club ===
Logvinaw left Shirak in December 2011 after a new Football Federation of Armenia regulation stated clubs could not field foreign goalkeepers.

== Honours ==
Shakhtyor Soligorsk

- Belarusian Premier League champion: 2005

Shirak

- Armenian Cup winner: 2011–12

Minsk

- Belarusian Cup winner: 2012–13
