= 2011 Armenian First League =

Football league season

The 2011 Armenian First League season began on 5 April 2011, and ended on 10 October 2011. At the end of 28 rounds, Shengavit were crowned champions; however, they were not eligible for promotion since they were the reserve team of Ulisses, which already participated in the Armenian Premier League.

== League table ==
Pos	Team	Pld	W	D	L	GF	GA	GD	Pts
1	Shengavit (C)	24	17	2	5	53	24	+29	53
2	Mika-2	24	13	7	4	51	19	+32	46
3	Pyunik-2	24	12	3	9	44	30	+14	39
4	Shirak-2	24	10	7	7	29	25	+4	37
5	Gandzasar-2	24	11	3	10	48	42	+6	36
6	Impulse-2	24	10	5	9	38	40	−2	35
7	Banants-2	24	10	4	10	35	35	0	34
8	Pyunik-3	24	6	1	17	27	61	−34	19
9	Ararat-2	24	2	2	20	15	64	−49	8

Rules for classification: 1) points; 2) goal difference; 3) number of goals scored.
(C) Champions

== See also ==
- 2011 Armenian Premier League
- 2011 Armenian Cup
