= Yoro Lamine Ly =

Senegalese footballer (1988–2025)

Yoro Ly
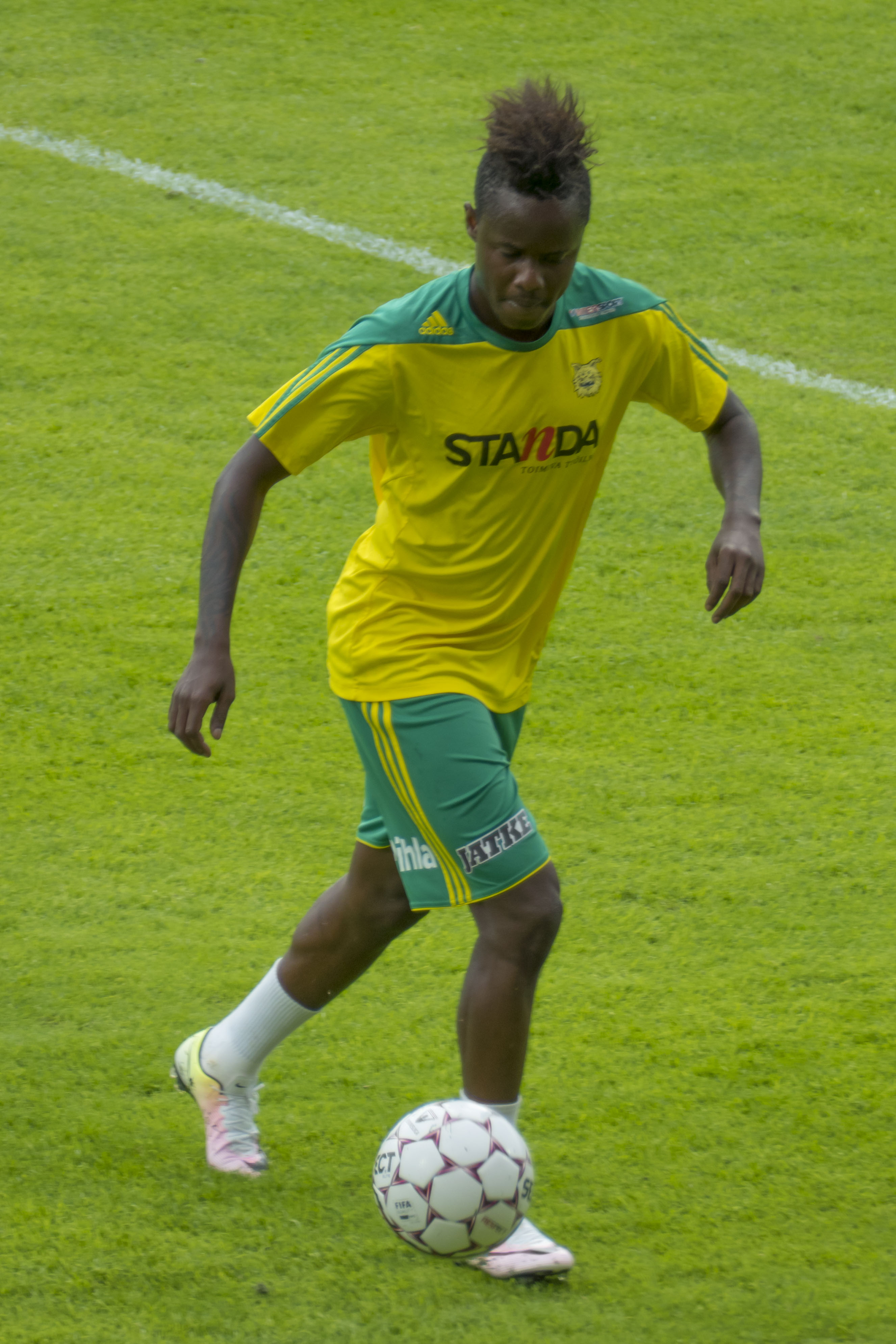
- Ly in 2016

Personal information
- Full name: Yoro Lamine Ly
- Date of birth: 27 August 1988
- Place of birth: Dakar, Senegal
- Date of death: 23 November 2025 (aged 37)
- Height: 1.78 m (5 ft 10 in)
- Position: Striker

Senior career*
| Years | Team | Apps | (Gls) |
| 2009–2011 | ASC Niarry Tally | 15 | (3) |
| 2011 | → Shirak (loan) | 10 | (2) |
| 2012–2014 | Shirak | 52 | (20) |
| 2013 | → Bnei Yehuda Tel Aviv (loan) | 9 | (1) |
| 2014–2016 | Boavista | 6 | (0) |
| 2015 | → BFC Daugavpils (loan) | 4 | (1) |
| 2016 | Doğan Türk Birliği | 7 | (2) |
| 2016 | Ilves | 10 | (1) |
| 2018 | Shirak | 8 | (0) |
| Total | | 121 | (30) |

International career
| 2010 | Senegal | 1 | (0) |
- * Club domestic league appearances and goals

Yoro Lamine Ly (27 August 1988 – 23 November 2025) was a Senegalese professional footballer who played as a striker for Armenian Premier League FC Shirak among other clubs. He made one appearance for the Senegal national team.

== Club career ==
On 5 August 2016, Ly signed a one-year contract, with the option of a second, with Veikkausliiga side FC Ilves.

== Death ==
Ly died on 23 November 2025, at the age of 37.

== Career statistics ==
=== Club ===
Appearances and goals by club, season and competition
| Club | Season | League | | | National cup | | Continental | | Total | |
| Club | Season | Division | Apps | Goals | Apps | Goals | Apps | Goals | Apps | Goals |
|---|---|---|---|---|---|---|---|---|---|---|
| Shirak (loan) | 2011 | Armenian Premier League | 10 | 2 | 2 | 0 | – | | 12 | 2 |
| Shirak | 2012–13 | Armenian Premier League | 39 | 18 | 7 | 1 | 4 | 1 | 50 | 20 |
| Shirak | 2013–14 | Armenian Premier League | 13 | 2 | 0 | 0 | 0 | 0 | 13 | 2 |
| Shirak | 2014–15 | Armenian Premier League | 0 | 0 | 0 | 0 | 2 | 0 | 2 | 0 |
| Shirak | Total | | 52 | 20 | 9 | 1 | 6 | 1 | 65 | 22 |
| Bnei Yehuda Tel Aviv (loan) | 2013–14 | Israeli Premier League | 9 | 1 | 0 | 0 | – | | 9 | 1 |
| Boavista | 2014–15 | Primeira Liga | 6 | 0 | 1 | 0 | – | | 7 | 0 |
| Boavista | 2015–16 | Primeira Liga | 0 | 0 | 0 | 0 | – | | 0 | 0 |
| Boavista | Total | | 6 | 0 | 1 | 0 | 0 | 0 | !7 | 0 |
| BFC Daugavpils (loan) | 2015 | Latvian Higher League | 4 | 1 | 0 | 0 | – | | 4 | 1 |
| Doğan Türk Birliği | 2015–16 | KTFF Süper Lig | 7 | 2 | | | – | | 7 | 2 |
| Ilves | 2016 | Veikkausliiga | 10 | 1 | 0 | 0 | – | | 9 | 1 |
| Shirak | 2017–18 | Armenian Premier League | 8 | 0 | 1 | 0 | 0 | 0 | 9 | 0 |
| Career total | | | 106 | 27 | 11 | 1 | 6 | 1 | 123 | 29 |

=== International ===
Appearances and goals by national team and year
| National team | Year | Apps | Goals |
|---|---|---|---|
| Senegal | 2010 | 1 | 0 |
| Total | | 1 | 0 |

== Honours ==
Shirak

- Armenian Premier League: 2012–13
- Armenian Cup: 2011–12
