= Hovhannes Tahmazyan =

Armenian footballer

Personal information
- Full name: Hovhannes Tahmazyan
- Date of birth: 11 January 1970 (age 56)
- Place of birth: Armenia
- Position: Defender

Senior career*
Years	Team	Apps	(Gls)
1987–2003	Shirak	221	(32)
2004–2007	Mika	83	(1)
2007–2011	Shirak	100	(0)

International career^{‡}
1992–1999	Armenia	6	(0)
- * Club domestic league appearances and goals as of 6 July 2020 ‡ National team caps and goals as of 6 July 2020

Hovhannes Tahmazyan (Armenian: Հովհաննես Թահմազյան; born on 11 January 1970) is a retired Armenian international footballer who played for Shirak and Mika.

== Career statistics ==
=== International ===
As of match played 18 August 1999

Appearances and goals by national team and year
National team	Year	Apps	Goals
Armenia	1992	1	0
Armenia	1993	0	0
Armenia	1994	0	0
Armenia	1995	4	0
Armenia	1996	0	0
Armenia	1997	0	0
Armenia	1998	0	0
Armenia	1999	1	0
Total		6	0
