= Nemanja Stošković =

Serbian footballer

Personal information
- Full name: Nemanja Stošković
- Date of birth: 21 February 1990 (age 36)
- Place of birth: Niš, SFR Yugoslavia
- Height: 1.77 m (5 ft 10 in)
- Position: Right winger

Youth career
- Radnički Niš
- Red Star Belgrade

Senior career*
Years	Team	Apps	(Gls)
2009–2011	Metalac Gornji Milanovac	29	(0)
2011	→ Radnički Niš (loan)	6	(0)
2012	Marsaxlokk	9	(1)
2012–2013	Banat Zrenjanin	17	(2)
2013	Smederevo	0	(0)
2014	Sinđelić Niš	12	(4)
2014–2015	Bregalnica Štip	4	(0)
2015	Sinđelić Niš	7	(3)
2016	Shirak	23	(2)
2017–2018	Sloboda Užice	12	(1)
2018–2022	Budućnost Popovac		
2022–2023	Sinđelić Niš		
2023–2025	VfB Bad Mergentheim	24	(3)
- * Club domestic league appearances and goals as of 16 March 2019

Nemanja Stošković (Serbian Cyrillic: Немања Стошковић; born 21 February 1990) is a Serbian footballer who plays as a right winger.

== Club career ==
In June 2016, Stošković extended his contract with FC Shirak, having previously signed for the club in February 2016. He left the club before new year 2017.
