= Tigran Davtyan =

Armenian football midfielder

Personal information
- Full name: Tigran Davtyan
- Date of birth: 10 June 1978 (age 48)
- Place of birth: Gyumri, Soviet Armenia
- Height: 1.70 m (5 ft 7 in)
- Position: Defensive midfielder

Team information
- Current team: Shirak (manager)

Senior career*
Years	Team	Apps	(Gls)
1999–2004	FC Shirak	149	(37)
2005–2007	FC Mika	79	(9)
2008	Ulisses FC	15	(1)
2009–	FC Shirak	227	(9)

International career^{‡}
2002	Armenia	1	(0)

Managerial career
- 2016–2020: Shirak-2
- 2020–: Shirak
- * Club domestic league appearances and goals as of 28 May 2015 ‡ National team caps and goals as of 23 July 2015

Tigran Lyudvigi Davtyan (Armenian: Տիգրան Լյուդվիգի Դավթյան, born 10 June 1978) is a former Armenian football midfielder. He is the former head coach Armenian Premier League club FC Shirak.

== National team history ==
His debut and last match was an away friendly match against Andorra on 7 June 2002.

== Honours ==
FC Shirak

- Armenian Premier League (1): 2012–13
- Armenian Cup (3): 2005, 2006, 2011–12
- Armenian Supercup (2): 2003, 2006
