= Beto (footballer, born 1986) =

Brazilian footballer

Personal information
- Full name: Webert da Silva Miguel
- Date of birth: November 15, 1986 (age 39)
- Place of birth: Ibirité, Brazil
- Position: Midfielder

Senior career*
Years	Team	Apps	(Gls)
2005–2007	Social	?	(?)
2007–2008	Belasitsa Petrich	35	(4)
2009	Slavia Sofia	10	(3)
2009	Montana	13	(2)
2010–2012	Banants	58	(14)
2012	Etar 1924	4	(0)
- * Club domestic league appearances and goals as of December 10, 2012

Webert da Silva Miguel (born 15 November 1986, in Ibirité), or simply Beto, is a Brazilian football player.

== Career ==
After spending the first two years of his career in his home country with Social Futebol Clube, Beto relocated to Bulgaria in June 2007, signing a three-year contract with Belasitsa Petrich. He made 35 appearances in all competitions and scored 4 goals for Belasitsa. In January 2009, the Brazilian midfielder transferred to Slavia Sofia. On the 8th Beto officially signed his 2,5 years contract. Until the end of the 2008-09 season he played 10 matches for the club, scoring three goals. In June 2009 Beto was transferred to Montana.
