= Karen Aleksanyan =

Armenian footballer

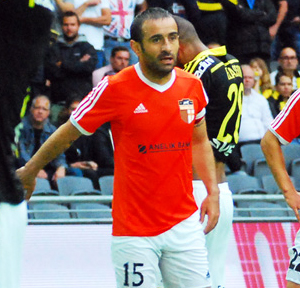

Personal information
- Full name: Karen Aleksanyan
- Date of birth: 17 June 1980 (age 46)
- Place of birth: Gyumri, Soviet Armenia
- Height: 1.68 m (5 ft 6 in)
- Position: Defensive midfielder

Senior career*
Years	Team	Apps	(Gls)
1997–2004	Shirak	137	(43)
2004–2005	Pyunik	22	(3)
2005–2008	Zimbru Chișinău	53	(2)
2008	Banants	4	(0)
2008–2009	Torpedo Zhodino	11	(1)
2009–2011	Ulisses	38	(0)
2011–2017	Shirak	129	(2)

International career^{‡}
2002–2008	Armenia	25	(0)
- * Club domestic league appearances and goals as of 9 January 2017 ‡ National team caps and goals as of 10 September 2008

Karen Aleksanyan (Armenian: Կարեն Համլետի Ալեքսանյան, born 17 June 1980 in Gyumri, Armenian SSR) is an Armenian retired football midfielder. Aleksanyan spent the majority of his career at Armenian Premier League club FC Shirak.

== Career ==
=== Club ===
Aleksanyan announced his retirement from football on 7 January 2017 to take up a coaching role at Shirak.

=== International ===
Aleksanyan represented Armenia on 25 occasions between 2002 and 2008, making his debut in an away friendly match against Andorra on 7 June 2002.

== Career statistics ==
=== International ===
Armenia national team
Year	Apps	Goals
2002	1	0
2003	0	0
2004	7	0
2005	6	0
2006	4	0
2007	1	0
2008	6	0
Total	25	0

Statistics accurate as of match played 11 October 2008
