= Arnar Stadium =

All-seater stadium in Ijevan, Armenia

Coordinates: 40°53′36″N 45°09′04″E

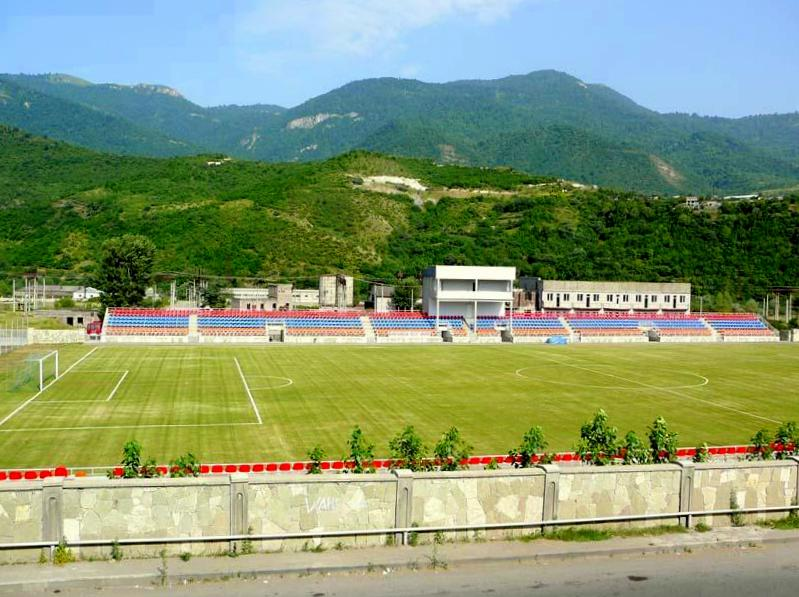
- Arnar Stadium
- Interactive map of Arnar Stadium
- Location: Ijevan, Armenia
- Owner: "Arnar" Charitable Fund
- Capacity: 2,100
- Surface: grass
- Field size: 110 x 70 meters

Construction
- Opened: 2007
- Cost: AMD 7,578,000

Tenants
- Impulse (2011-2012); Shirak (2011-2012)

Arnar Stadium (Armenian: Արնար մարզադաշտ) is an all-seater stadium in Ijevan, Armenia, mainly used for football matches. With a capacity of 2,100 seats, it is the only stadium in Ijevan.

== Overview ==
The stadium was built in 2007, by the "Arnar" Charitable Fund directed by the Armenian businessman Artsruni Ghalumian. The first ever competitive match in Arnar Stadium was the Armenian Independence Cup final match in 2008 between Ararat Yerevan and Banants. Ararat Yerevan won the title defeating Banmants 2-1 after extra time with the presence of 2,500 spectators.

Between 2011 and 2012, the stadium was used as a home venue by two teams of the Armenian Premier League; Impulse from Dilijan and Shirak from Gyumri.

The stadium has an adjacent small pitch designated for trainings.
