= Gevorg Hovhannisyan =

Armenian footballer

Personal information
- Full name: Gevorg Karapetovich Hovhannisyan
- Date of birth: 16 June 1983 (age 43)
- Place of birth: Leninakan, Armenian SSR, Soviet Union
- Height: 1.93 m (6 ft 4 in)
- Position: Centre-back

Youth career
- –2001: Shirak

Senior career*
Years	Team	Apps	(Gls)
2003–2017	Shirak	242	(10)
2017–2018	Banants	11	(0)

International career^{‡}
2016	Armenia	1	(0)
- * Club domestic league appearances and goals as of 12:03, 5 May 2019 (UTC) ‡ National team caps and goals as of 12:03, 5 May 2019 (UTC)

Gevorg Karapetovich Hovhannisyan (Armenian: Գևորգ Կարապետի Հովհաննիսյան, Russian: Геворг Карапетович Оганесян; born 16 June 1983) is an Armenian former footballer who played as a centre-back and made one appearance for the Armenia national team.

== Career ==
Hovhannisyan made his only international appearance for Armenia on 4 September 2016 in a 2018 FIFA World Cup qualification match against Denmark, which finished as a 0–1 away loss.

== Career statistics ==
=== International ===
Armenia
Year	Apps	Goals
2016	1	0
Total	1	0
