= 2011–12 Armenian Cup =

Tournament details
- Country: Armenia
- Teams: 8

Final positions
- Champions: Shirak
- Runners-up: Impulse
- UEFA Europa League: Shirak

Tournament statistics
- Matches played: 13
- Goals scored: 26 (2 per match)

The 2011–12 Armenian Cup was the 21st season of Armenia's football knockout competition. It featured the eight 2011 Premier League teams. The tournament began on 19 November 2011. Mika were the defending champions. The winners entered the first qualifying round of the 2012–13 UEFA Europa League.

== Results ==
=== Quarter-finals ===
All eight Premier League clubs competed in this round. The first legs were played on 19 and 20 November 2011, with the second legs were played on 23 and 24 November 2011.

Team 1	Agg.	Team 2	1st leg	2nd leg
Gandzasar	0–2	Impulse	0–1	0–1
Ulisses	5–4	Ararat Yerevan	3–1	2–3
Shirak	2–1	Banants	2–1	0–0
Pyunik	1–3	Mika	0–0	1–3

=== Semi-finals ===
The four winners from the quarterfinals entered this round. The first legs were played on 17 March 2012, with the second legs were played on 11 April 2012.

Team 1	Agg.	Team 2	1st leg	2nd leg
Impulse	2–1	Ulisses	2–1	0–0
Shirak	(a)2–2	Mika	0–1	2–1

=== Final ===
29 April 2012
14:30 CEST

Impulse	0 – 1	Shirak
	Report	Ly 38'

Gyumri City Stadium, Gyumri
Attendance: 3,000
Referee: Andrea De Marco (Italy)
