= Mika Stadium =

Football stadium in Yerevan, Armenia

Coordinates: 40.1493734°N 44.4764489°E

Mika Stadium Միկա մարզադաշտ
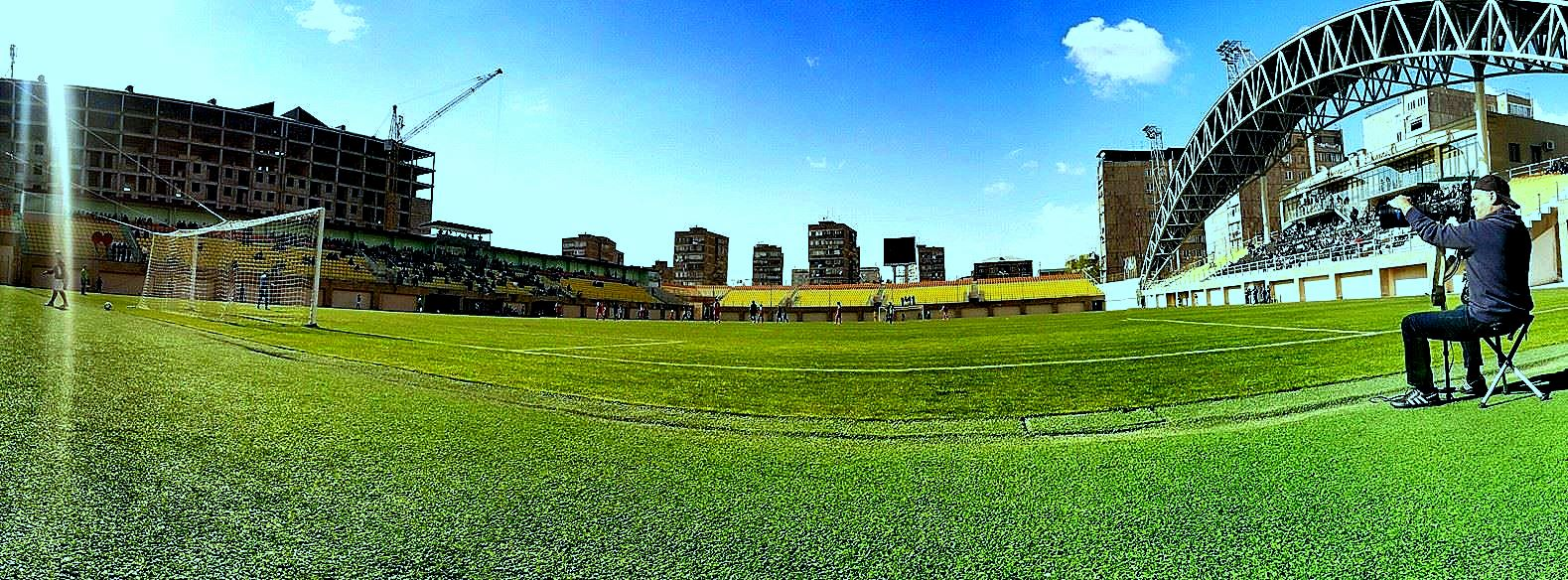
- Mika Stadium in 2015
- Interactive map of Mika Stadium; Միկա մարզադաշտ
- Location: Yerevan, Armenia
- Owner: Government of Armenia
- Operator: Ministry of Sports and Youth Affairs
- Capacity: 7,000
- Surface: grass
- Field size: 105 x 68 meters

Construction
- Built: 2006–2007
- Opened: 2008

Tenants
- Mika (2008–present); Lokomotiv Yerevan (2018-2020); West Armenia (2019-2020)

Mika Stadium (Armenian: Միկա Մարզադաշտ), is a football stadium in Yerevan, Armenia, built in 2006–2007 and opened in 2008. The capacity of the stadium is 7,000 It has served as the home ground of Ulisses FC, FC Lokomotiv Yerevan, FC Noah and FC West Armenia, currently used by Armenian women's national team and FC Mika.

== History ==
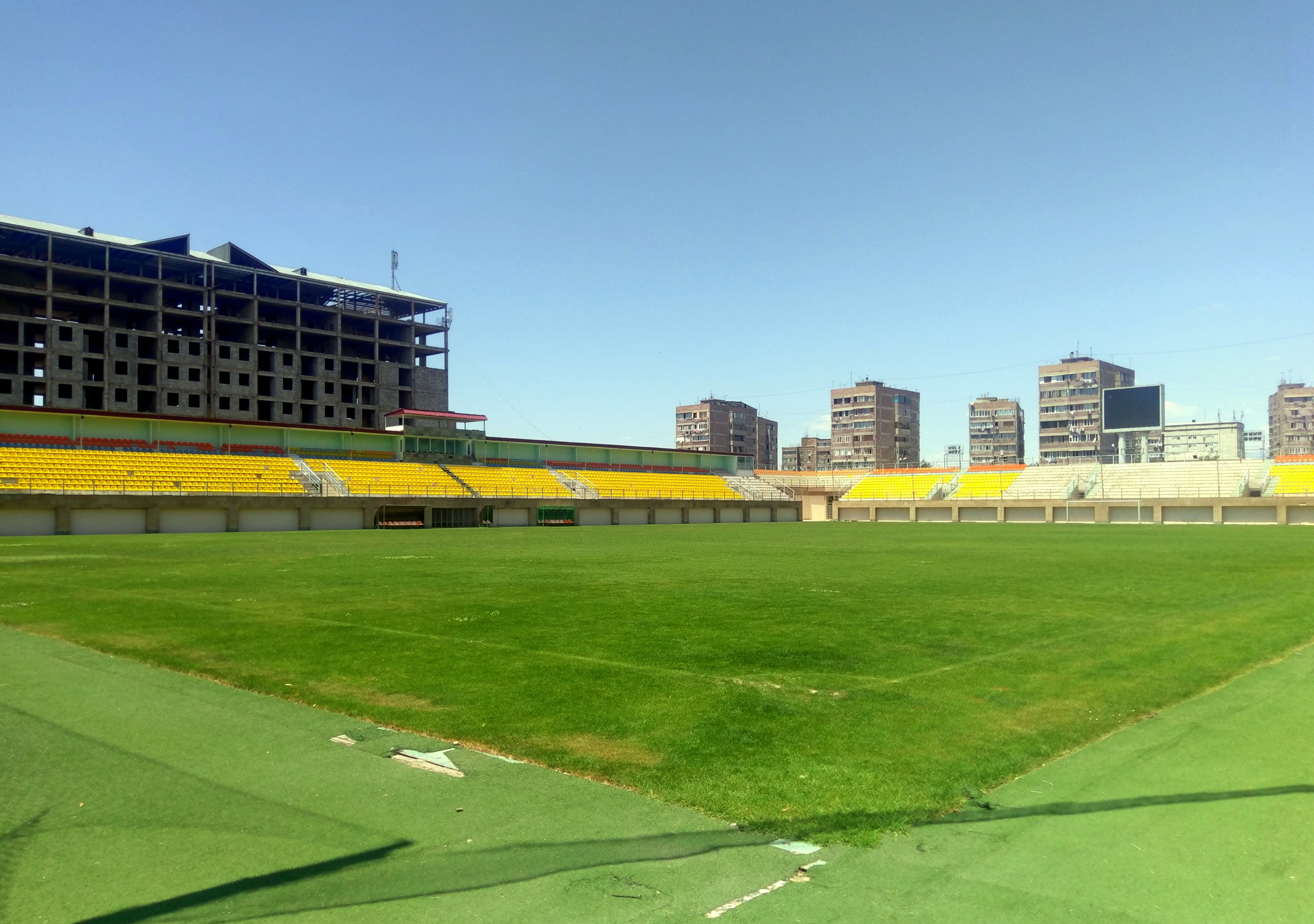
General view

The construction of the stadium started in 2006 on the location of the former Araks Stadium. It was completed in 2008 and hosted the first ever match on 22 May of the same year between the U-19 national teams of Spain and Ukraine. The match ended in a 3–1 victory for the Spaniards. The first ever goal in Mika Stadium was scored by the Ukraine U-19 player Andriy Yarmolenko with a penalty kick in the 18th minute of the match.

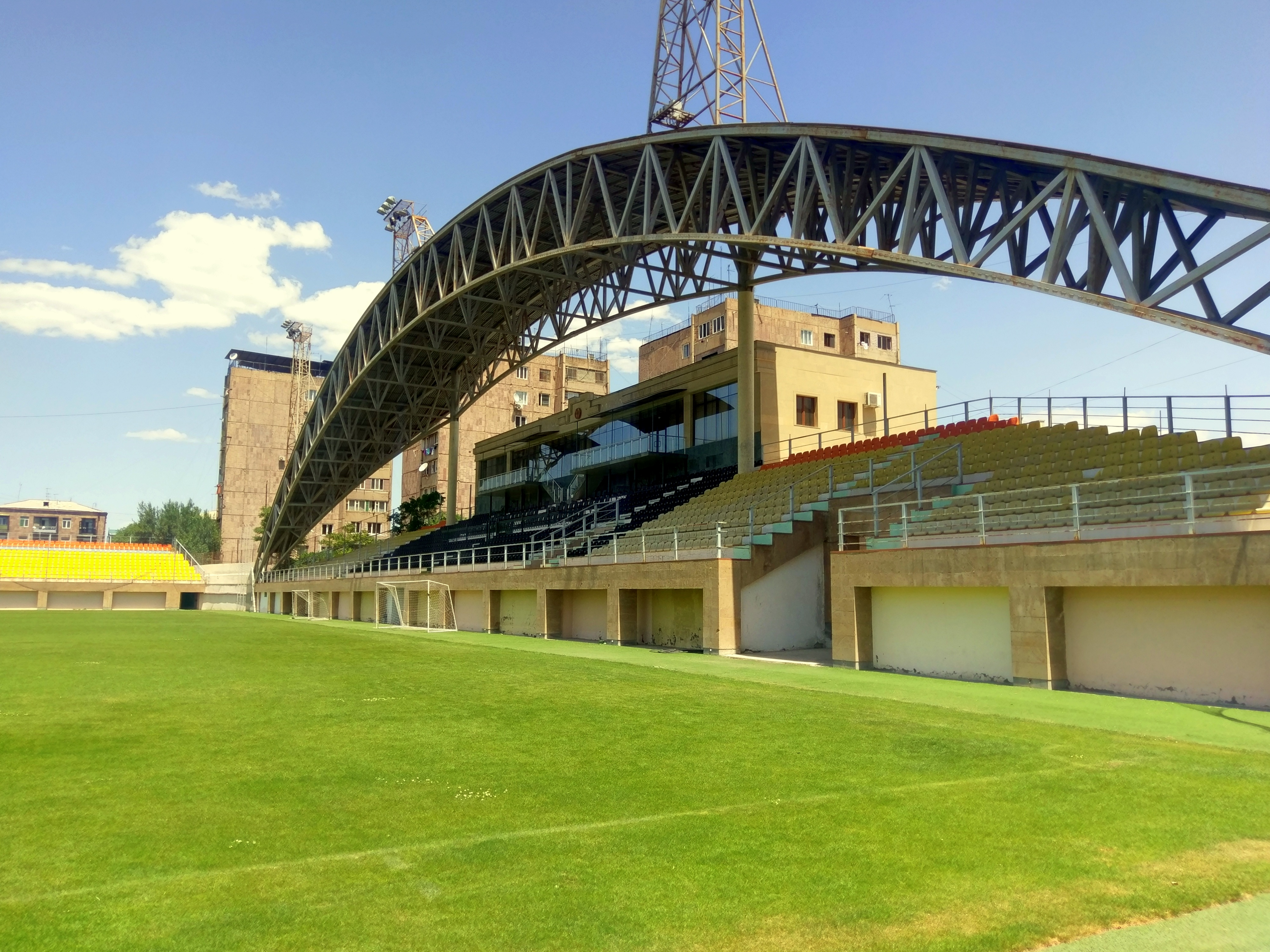
The main stand

FC Mika played their first game in the stadium on 8 June 2008 against Kilikia FC. Mika won the match 1–0 with Stepan Hakobyan becoming the first ever goalscorer of the club at their new stadium, when he scored the winning goal at the 81st minute of the match.

On 5 November 2011, the FC Mika Museum was opened within the complex.

On August 28, 2014, due to the accumulated debts of the owners, the ownership of the stadium was transferred to the Government of Armenia for AMD 9.045 billion (US$22 million).

The stadium is part of the Republican Complex Center for the Developments of Sports run by the Ministry of Sports and Youth Affairs of Armenia, including the Mika Sports Arena, an indoor fitness centre, martial arts school, table tennis hall, mini-football grounds with artificial and natural turf, as well as many other facilities.
