= Gyumri City Stadium =

Stadium in Armenia

Coordinates: 40°47′09″N 43°50′00″E

Gyumri City Stadium Գյումրիի քաղաքային մարզադաշտ
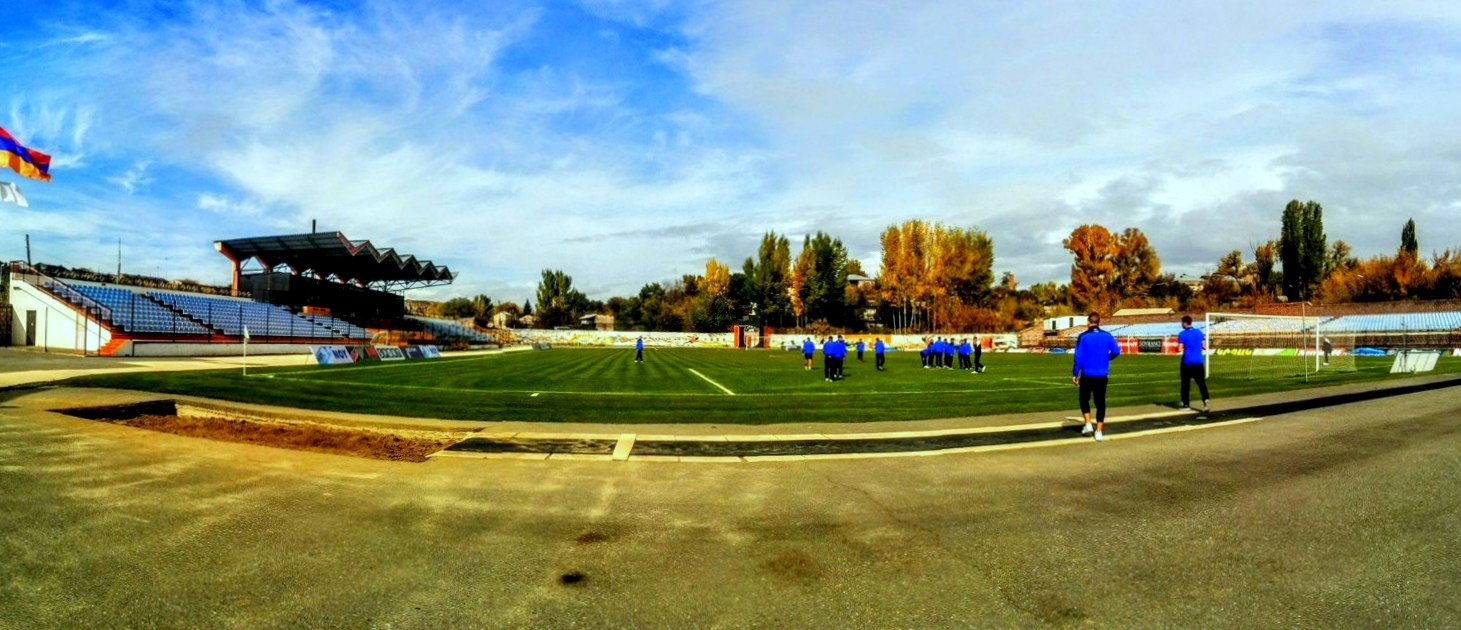
- Gyumri City Stadium in 2012 Gyumri City Stadium
- Interactive map of Gyumri City Stadium; Գյումրիի քաղաքային մարզադաշտ
- Location: Gyumri, Armenia
- Owner: Gyumri City Council
- Capacity: 5,000
- Surface: grass
- Field size: 105 x 68 meters

Construction
- Built: 1924
- Renovated: 1999, 2012, 2019

Tenants
- Shirak (1958–present); Shirak-2 (2017–present)

Gyumri City Stadium (Armenian: Գյումրիի քաղաքային մարզադաշտ) is an all-seater football stadium in Gyumri, Armenia. It is currently the home venue of the Armenian Premier League club FC Shirak of Gyumri. The current capacity of the stadium is 4,000 seats.

== History ==
The stadium was built and opened in 1924 to become the first stadium in the modern history of Armenia. When Shirak was founded in 1958, the stadium became the regular home ground of the team for the Soviet First League competition. Starting from 1991, the stadium witnessed many glorious moments of FC Shirak in the Armenian Premier League and the Armenian Independence Cup. The stadium hosted the 2011–12 Armenian Cup final match when Shirak defeated Impulse to win the title for the first time in their history.

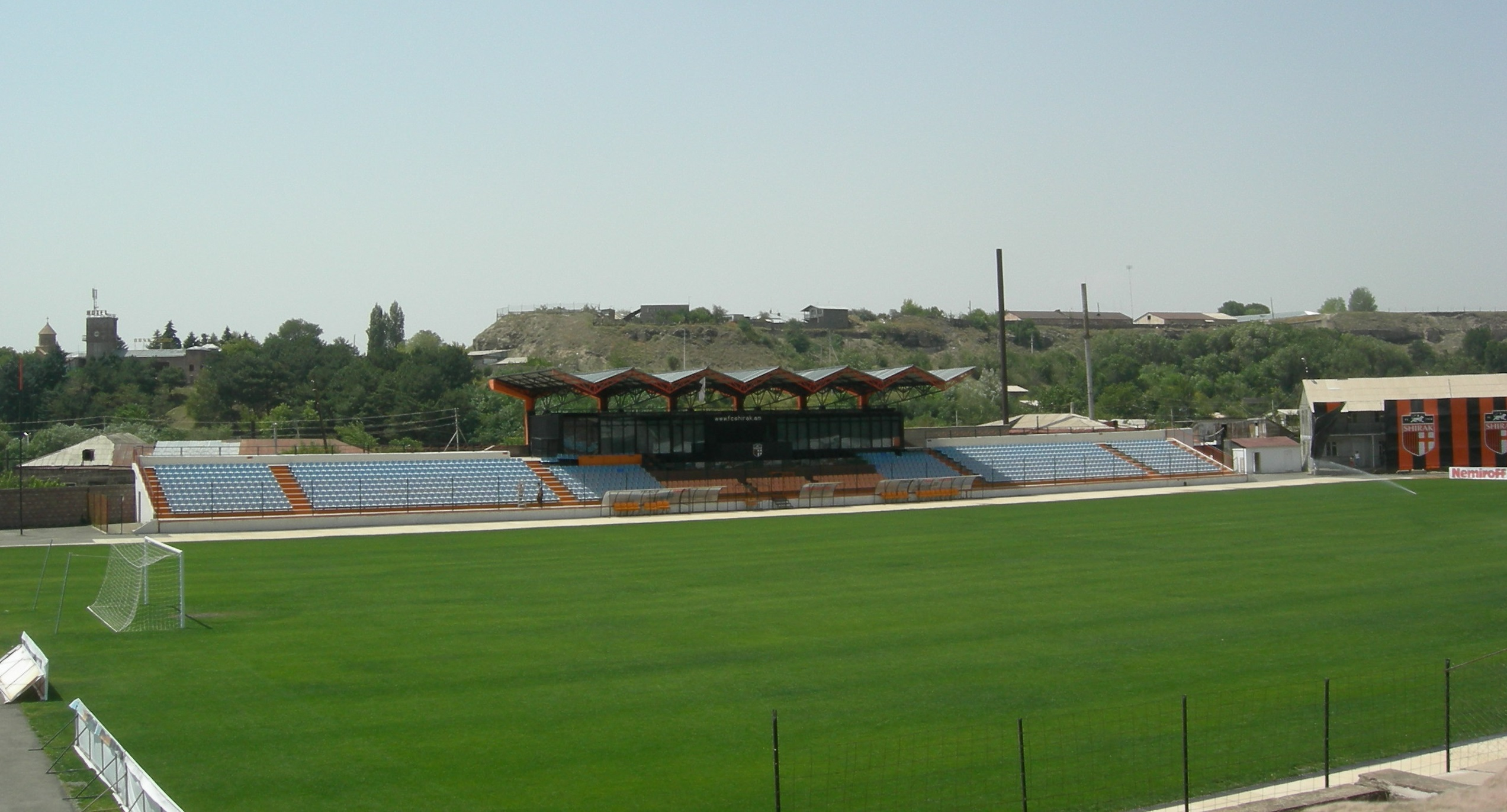
The main stand

The venue was reconstructed in 1999 and turned into an all-seater stadium. The total capacity of the stadium became 2,844 seats (1,413 at the western stand and 1,431 at the eastern stand).

During 2012, the playing pitch and many other facilities were entirely renovated to meet UEFA standards.

The stadium has been the home ground of Shirak for domestic competitions since 1958. However, after the most recent developments in 2012, the stadium was also permitted to be used by the club for their home games in European competitions.

On 12 July 2012, Shirak hosted Rudar Pljevlja at the Gyumri City Stadium, in the qualifying phase of the 2012–13 UEFA Europa League. The match ended in a 1–1 draw, allowing FC Shirak to advance with a 2–1 win on aggregate.

After the most recent renovation took place during summer 2019, the capacity of the stadium was increased from 2,844 to 4,500 seats, following the installment of new seats at the southern end of the stadium.
