= 2011 African Youth Championship squads =

This article will display the squads for the 2011 African Youth Championship. Only players born on or after 1 January 1991 are eligible to play.

Each participating national association must submit a list of up to 40 players to the CAF administration on or before 16 February 2011 (sixty days before the first game of the final tournament).

Only 21 of the 40 players listed are authorised to take part in the final tournament. The final squad of 21 players must be submitted on or before 7 April 2011 (ten days before the first game of the final tournament).

== Egypt ==
Head coach: (Egypt) Diaa Al-Sayed

No.	Pos.	Player	Date of birth (age)	Caps	Goals	Club
1	GK	Ahmed El Shenawy	14 May 1991 (aged 19)			(Egyptian Football Association) El Masry
2	DF	Ramy Rabia	20 May 1993 (aged 17)			(Egyptian Football Association) Al-Ahly
3	DF	Ayman Ashraf	9 April 1991 (aged 20)			(Egyptian Football Association) Al-Ahly
4	DF	Mohamed Abdel Fattah				(Egyptian Football Association) Al-Ahly
5	MF	Ahmed Younis	10 February 1991 (aged 20)			(Egyptian Football Association) ENPPI Club
6	DF	Ahmed Hegazi				(Egyptian Football Association) Ismaily SC
7	MF	Hussein El-Sayed				(Egyptian Football Association) Al-Ahly
8	MF	Ahmed Sobhi	4 March 1991 (aged 20)			(Egyptian Football Association) ENPPI Club
9	FW	Mohamed Hamdy				(Egyptian Football Association) Union Alexandria
10	MF	Ahmed Nabil				(Egyptian Football Association) Al-Ahly
11	DF	Ali Fathy				(Egyptian Football Association) Arab Contractors SC
12	FW	Mohamed Salah				(Egyptian Football Association) Arab Contractors SC
13	MF	Ahmed Tawfik				(Egyptian Football Association) Zamalek SC
14	MF	Mohamed Ibrahim				(Egyptian Football Association) Zamalek SC
15	MF	Mahmoud Ezzat				(Egyptian Football Association) Arab Contractors SC
16	GK	Mohamed Awad				(Egyptian Football Association) Ismaily SC
17	MF	Mohamed El Nenny				(Egyptian Football Association) Arab Contractors SC
18	DF	Omar Gaber				(Egyptian Football Association) Zamalek SC
19	FW	Ahmed Hassan Mahgoub	5 March 1993 (aged 18)			(Egyptian Football Association) Al-Ahly
20	FW	Trezeguet				(Egyptian Football Association) Al-Ahly
21	GK	Ahmed Behiry				(Egyptian Football Association) Arab Contractors SC

== Cameroon ==
Head coach:

No.	Pos.	Player	Date of birth (age)	Caps	Goals	Club
1	GK	Thierry Tangouatio	4 May 1992 (aged 18)			(Cameroonian Football Federation) Sable de Batié
2	MF	Eric Nyatchou				(French Football Federation) RC Strasbourg
3	DF	Ambroise Oyongo	22 June 1991 (aged 19)			(Cameroonian Football Federation) Cotonsport FC
4	DF	Yaya Banana	29 July 1991 (aged 19)			(Tunisian Football Federation) Espérance de Tunis
5	DF	Ghislain Mvom	23 October 1992 (aged 18)			(Cameroonian Football Federation) Les Astres FC
6	DF	Idriss Nguessi				(Cameroonian Football Federation) Etoa Meki FC
7	MF	Edgar Salli	17 August 1992 (aged 18)			(Cameroonian Football Federation) Cotonsport FC
8	MF	Emmanuel Mbongo				(Cameroonian Football Federation) Cotonsport FC
9	FW	Franck Ohandza				(Football Association of Thailand) Buriram PEA F.C.
10	MF	Jacques Haman				(Cameroonian Football Federation) Cotonsport
11	FW	Christian Toko				(Cameroonian Football Federation) Renaissance de Ngoumou
12	FW	Franck Nkom				(Cameroonian Football Federation) Panthère FC
13	MF	Serge Tchana				(Royal Spanish Football Federation) Torre Levante CF
14	MF	Yazid Atouba				(Cameroonian Football Federation) Canon Yaoundé
15	DF	Yann Songo'o	17 November 1991 (aged 19)			(Royal Spanish Football Federation) Real Zaragoza
16	GK	Jean Efala	11 August 1992 (aged 18)			(Cameroonian Football Federation) Fovu
17	DF	Vincent Bikana				(Brazilian Football Confederation) Corinthians
18	DF	Alain Bati	5 January 1994 (aged 17)			(Royal Spanish Football Federation) Villarreal
19	FW	Joel Tagueu				(Brazilian Football Confederation) Iraty Sport Club
20	MF	Armand Ken Ella	23 February 1993 (aged 18)			(Royal Spanish Football Federation) Barcelona
21	GK	Eric Ngana				(Cameroonian Football Federation) Renaissance de Ngoumou
22	DF	Alexandre Nsangue				(Cameroonian Football Federation) Union Douala
23	MF	Clarence Bitang				(Cameroonian Football Federation) Les Astres FC

== Gambia ==
Head coach: (The Gambia) Lamin Sarr

No.	Pos.	Player	Date of birth (age)	Caps	Goals	Club
1	GK	Musa Camara				(Gambia Football Federation) Gamtel
2	MF	Pa Sulayman Badjie				(Gambia Football Federation) Samger FC
3	FW	Alassana Camara				(Gambia Football Federation) Steve Biko Football Club
4	DF	Ebrima Camara				(Swedish Football Association) Gunnilse IS
5	DF	Abdou Njie				(Gambia Football Federation) GPA
6	MF	Lamin Sarjo Samateh	20 December 1993 (aged 17)			(Gambia Football Federation) Samger FC
7	MF	Saihou Gassama				(Royal Spanish Football Federation) Real Zaragoza
8	MF	Mustapha Jatta				(Gambia Football Federation) Hawks
9	MF	Pateh Nyang				(Gambia Football Federation) Seaview
10	MF	Mamut Saine				(Gambia Football Federation) Seaview
11	DF	Baboucarr Savage				(Gambia Football Federation) Real de Banjul
12	DF	Matarr Jobe				(Football Association of Iceland) Valur
13	FW	Ousman Jarju	27 March 1991 (aged 20)			(Royal Spanish Football Federation) Atlético Madrid B
14	DF	Saikou Jawneh				(Gambia Football Federation) Bakau United
15	FW	Ebrima Kanteh Ndow				(Royal Spanish Football Federation)
16	MF	Baboucarr Jammeh				(United States Soccer Federation) Rush Academy
17	FW	Ebrima Camara				(Gambia Football Federation) Bakau United
18	GK	Baboucarr Sanyang				(Gambia Football Federation) Brikama United
19	DF	Omar Colley				(United States Soccer Federation) Sporting Kansas City
20	GK	Alagie Nyabally				(Gambia Football Federation) Bakau United
21	FW	Kabba-Modou Cham				(Royal Belgian Football Association) KV Mechelen

== Ghana ==
Head coach: (Ghana) Orlando Wellington

No.	Pos.	Player	Date of birth (age)	Caps	Goals	Club
1	GK	Foli Adade	10 December 1992 (aged 18)			(Ghana Football Association) Ebusua Dwarfs
16	GK	Akwasi Acheampong	30 November 1991 (aged 19)			(Ghana Football Association) Liberty Professionals
21	GK	Ibrahim Alhassan	5 July 1992 (aged 18)			(Ghana Football Association) Madina United
2	DF	Rashid Sumaila	28 March 1992 (aged 19)			(Ghana Football Association) Ebusua Dwarfs
3	DF	Masahudu Alhassan	1 December 1992 (aged 18)			(Italian Football Federation) Genoa C.F.C.
4	DF	Adnan Saeed	17 March 1993 (aged 18)			(Ghana Football Association) Wa All Stars
5	DF	Karim Alhassan	30 April 1991 (aged 19)			(Ghana Football Association) Accra Hearts of Oak SC
12	DF	Richmond Nketiah	5 January 1993 (aged 18)			(Ghana Football Association) F.C. Nania
14	DF	Paul Aidoo	14 November 1993 (aged 17)			(Ghana Football Association) Berekum Chelsea
18	DF	Seidu Shaibu Zida	5 August 1992 (aged 18)			(Ghana Football Association) Wa All Stars
19	DF	Samuel Kyere	9 August 1992 (aged 18)			(Ghana Football Association) Berekum Chelsea
6	MF	Ebenezer Otu	8 August 1993 (aged 17)			(Ghana Football Association) Berekum Chelsea
7	MF	Albert Bruce	30 December 1993 (aged 17)			(Ghana Football Association) Asante Kotoko
8	MF	Mahatma Otoo	6 February 1992 (aged 19)			(Ghana Football Association) Accra Hearts of Oak SC
10	MF	Kwame Amponsah-Karikari	21 January 1992 (aged 19)			(Swedish Football Association) AIK
11	MF	Kwame Nsor	1 August 1992 (aged 18)			(French Football Federation) FC Metz
13	MF	Bright Addae	19 December 1992 (aged 18)			(Royal Spanish Football Federation) Terrassa FC
17	MF	James Bissue	16 June 1991 (aged 19)			(Israel Football Association) Hapoel Be'er Sheva F.C.
9	FW	Enoch Ebo Andoh	1 January 1993 (aged 18)			(Portuguese Football Federation) S.L. Benfica
15	FW	Gershon Koffie	25 August 1991 (aged 19)			(Canadian Soccer Association) Vancouver Whitecaps FC
20	FW	Richmond Boakye	28 January 1993 (aged 18)			(Italian Football Federation) Genoa C.F.C.

== Lesotho ==
Head coach: (Lesotho) Khiba Mohoanyane

No.	Pos.	Player	Date of birth (age)	Caps	Goals	Club
1	GK	Sefatsa Baholo	28 December 1992 (aged 18)			(Lesotho Football Association) Nyenye Rovers
2	MF	Sepiriti David Malefane	8 August 1994 (aged 16)			(South African Football Association) Bloemfontein Celtics Academy
3	MF	Thabiso Justice Mohapi	17 September 1992 (aged 18)			(Lesotho Football Association) FC Likhopo
4	MF	Teboho Christophar Lekhooa	31 December 1996 (aged 14)			(Lesotho Football Association) Lioli FC
5	DF	Mafa Moremoholo	24 November 1994 (aged 16)			(Lesotho Football Association) Joy FC
6	DF	Salebone Lekhooa	14 March 1993 (aged 18)			(Lesotho Football Association) FC Likhopo
7	MF	Montoeli Clement Sonopo	20 January 1994 (aged 17)			(Lesotho Football Association) Lioli FC
8	DF	Kopano Neris Tseka	8 November 1991 (aged 19)			(Lesotho Football Association) Lerotholi Polytechnic
9	FW	Tsebang Lebata	27 March 1994 (aged 17)			(Lesotho Football Association) FC Likhopo
10	MF	Christopher Boseka Mosiuda	31 December 1991 (aged 19)			(Lesotho Football Association) Bantu FC
11	MF	Tsoanelo Koetle	22 November 1992 (aged 18)			(Lesotho Football Association) Matlama FC
12	FW	Lehlomela George Ramabele	14 April 1992 (aged 19)			(Botswana Football Association) Botswana Defence Force XI
13	GK	Kananelo Makhooane	11 May 1992 (aged 18)			(Lesotho Football Association) FC Likhopo
14	FW	Khesa Makateng	3 September 1992 (aged 18)			(Lesotho Football Association) Litsilo FC
15	MF	Litsepe Leonty Marabe	20 February 1992 (aged 19)			(Lesotho Football Association) Matlama FC
16	FW	Lebajoa Mosehlenyane	3 May 1992 (aged 18)			(Lesotho Football Association) Mpharane Celtics
17	MF	Jeremea Kamela	17 May 1992 (aged 18)			(Lesotho Football Association) Joy FC
18	DF	Basia Kenneth Makepe	4 March 1991 (aged 20)			(Lesotho Football Association) Joy FC
19	FW	Emmanuel Lekhanya Lekhanya	24 June 1992 (aged 18)			(Lesotho Football Association) Fc Likhopo
20	DF	Monne Jonas Pitso	4 November 1992 (aged 18)			(Lesotho Football Association) Lioli FC

== Mali ==
Head coach: (Mali) Cheick Fantamady Diallo

No.	Pos.	Player	Date of birth (age)	Caps	Goals	Club
		Cheick A Sy				(Malian Football Federation) Djoliba AC
		Seydou Diallo				(Malian Football Federation) Djoliba AC
		Boubacar Togola				(Malian Football Federation) Stade Malien
		Bakary Dembélé				(Malian Football Federation) Stade Malien
		Oumar Koné				(Malian Football Federation) Stade Malien
		Moussa Coulibaly				(Malian Football Federation) Stade Malien
		Cheick Fantamady Diarra				(Malian Football Federation) Stade Malien
		Amara Konaté				(Malian Football Federation) AS Bamako
		Drissa Ballo				(Malian Football Federation) AS Bamako
		Amara Mallé				(Malian Football Federation) AS Bamako
		Issa Fofana				(Malian Football Federation) Jeanne d'Arc FC
		Mohamed Traoré				(Malian Football Federation) Club Olympique
		Boubacar Sylla	17 April 1991 (aged 20)			(French Football Federation) Châteauroux
		Sidy Koné	6 June 1992 (aged 18)			(French Football Federation) Olympique Lyonnais
		Souleymane Demba	17 June 1991 (aged 19)			(Royal Moroccan Football Federation) Raja de Casablanca
		Cheick Mohamed Chérif Doumbia				(Libyan Football Federation)
		Abdoulaye Coulibaly				(French Football Federation) Bordeaux
		Kalifa Traoré				(French Football Federation) Paris St. Germain
		Adama Touré	28 August 1991 (aged 19)			(French Football Federation) Paris St. Germain
		Kalifa Coulibaly				(French Football Federation) Paris St. Germain
		Ibrahim Diallo				(French Football Federation) AJ Auxerre

== Nigeria ==
Head coach: (Nigeria) John Obuh

No.	Pos.	Player	Date of birth (age)	Caps	Goals	Club
1	GK	Danjuma Paul	18 December 1992 (aged 18)			(Nigeria Football Federation) Nasarawa United
21	GK	John Felagha	27 July 1994 (aged 16)			(Qatar Football Association) Aspire Academy
16	GK	Gideon Gambo	15 November 1992 (aged 18)			(Nigeria Football Federation) Sharks FC
14	DF	Markson Ojobo^{1}	1 December 1992 (aged 18)			(Nigeria Football Federation) Enyimba International F.C.
5	DF	Ganiu Ogungbe	1 December 1992 (aged 18)			(Nigeria Football Federation) Gateway F.C.
3	DF	Mohammed Goyi Aliyu	12 February 1993 (aged 18)			(Royal Spanish Football Federation) Villarreal CF
2	DF	Terna Suswam	5 September 1991 (aged 19)			(Portuguese Football Federation) Vitória de Setúbal
4	DF	Kingsley Oluocha	28 August 1992 (aged 18)			(Nigeria Football Federation) Abia Warriors F.C.
6	DF	Gbenga Arokoyo	1 November 1992 (aged 18)			(Nigeria Football Federation) Kwara United
13	DF	Emmanuel Anyanwu	15 November 1991 (aged 19)			(Nigeria Football Federation) Enyimba International F.C.
17	MF	Chidi Osuchukwu	11 October 1993 (aged 17)			(Nigeria Football Federation) Dolphins
20	MF	Ramón Azeez	12 December 1992 (aged 18)			(Royal Spanish Football Federation) UD Almería
15	MF	Philemon Daniel	20 March 1992 (aged 19)			(Nigeria Football Federation) Kwara United
10	MF	Abdul Jeleel Ajagun	10 February 1993 (aged 18)			(Nigeria Football Federation) Dolphins
12	FW	Uche Nwofor	17 September 1992 (aged 18)			(Nigeria Football Federation) Enugu Rangers
9	FW	Kayode Olarenwaju	8 May 1993 (aged 17)			(Ivorian Football Federation) ASEC Mimosas
18	FW	Edafe Egbedi	3 August 1993 (aged 17)			(Nigeria Football Federation) Clique Sports
8	FW	Stanley Okoro	8 December 1992 (aged 18)			(Royal Spanish Football Federation) UD Almería
11	FW	Terry Envoh	12 December 1992 (aged 18)			(Nigeria Football Federation) Sharks FC
19	FW	Gomo Onduku^{1}	17 November 1993 (aged 17)			(Nigeria Football Federation) Sharks FC
7	FW	Ahmed Musa	14 October 1992 (aged 18)			(Royal Dutch Football Association) VVV Venlo

Notes

- Note 1: Markson Ojobo and Gomo Onduko were dropped just hours prior to Nigeria's opening match for "technical reasons". Reports suggested that both players were found to be over-aged.

== South Africa ==
Head coach: (South Africa) Maqsood Chenia

No.	Pos.	Player	Date of birth (age)	Caps	Goals	Club
1	GK	Ronwen Williams	21 January 1992 (age 34)			(South African Football Association) SuperSport United
2	DF	Doctor Mampuru	28 August 1992 (age 33)			(South African Football Association) Mamelodi Sundowns
3	DF	Enrico Adolph	7 January 1992 (age 34)			(South African Football Association) Wits University
4	DF	Sabata Mosebo	28 August 1992 (age 33)			(South African Football Association) Carara Kicks
5	DF	Lucky Baloyi	19 June 1991 (age 35)			(South African Football Association) Kaizer Chiefs
6	DF	Awonke Kwenene	2 January 1992 (age 34)			(South African Football Association) Jomo Cosmos
7	MF	Tshegofatso Ramabu	25 December 1992 (age 33)			(South African Football Association) Kaizer Chiefs
8	MF	Mbuso Manyoni	8 July 1992 (age 34)			(South African Football Association) SuperSport United
9	FW	Letsie Koapeng	1 December 1992 (age 33)			(South African Football Association) Wits University
10	MF	Keagan Buchanan	3 April 1992 (age 34)			(South African Football Association) FC Cape Town
11	MF	Philani Khwela (captain)	22 August 1991 (age 34)			(South African Football Association) SuperSport United
12	MF	Ayanda Lubelo	28 October 1991 (age 34)			(South African Football Association) Africa Sports Academy
13	MF	Lyle Lakay	17 August 1991 (age 35)			(South African Football Association) SuperSport United
14	DF	Miquel Timm	31 January 1992 (age 34)			(South African Football Association) SuperSport United
15	MF	Jabulani Ncubeni	18 December 1992 (age 33)			(South African Football Association) Maritzburg United
16	GK	Sherwyn Naicker	26 March 1991 (age 35)			(South African Football Association) SuperSport United
17	FW	Lucky Nguzana	14 April 1991 (age 35)			(South African Football Association) African Warriors
18	FW	Sheldon Stevens	15 August 1991 (age 35)			(South African Football Association) SuperSport United
19	FW	Andile Khumalo	24 September 1991 (age 34)			(South African Football Association) AmaZulu
20	DF	Mpho Maruping	7 August 1991 (age 35)			(South African Football Association) Nathi Lions
21	GK	Tawfeeq Salie	21 July 1991 (age 35)			(South African Football Association) Ajax Cape Town
