= 2012–13 Shirak FC season =

Shirak
2012-13 season
- Chairman: Arman Sahakyan
- Manager: Vardan Bichakhchyan
- Stadium: Gyumri City Stadium
- Premier League: 1st
- 2011-12 Armenian Cup: Champions
- 2012-13 Armenian Cup: Runners-Up vs Pyunik
- UEFA Europa League: Second qualifying round vs Bnei Yehuda
- Top goalscorer: League: Yoro Lamine Ly (18); All: Yoro Lamine Ly (20)
- Highest home attendance: 3,000 vs Gandzasar Kapan (28 October 2012); 3,000 vs Impuls (30 March 2013)
- Lowest home attendance: 100 vs Pyunik (21 April 2012)
- Average home league attendance: 1,564 (12 May 2013)

The 2012–13 season was Shirak's 22nd consecutive season in the Armenian Premier League and covers the period from 1 January 2012 to 30 June 2013. Shirak finished the season by winning their fourth Premier League title, whilst they lost to Pyunik in the final of the Armenian Cup. In Europe, Shirak defeated Rudar Pljevlja in the first qualifying round of the UEFA Europa League before being knocked out by Bnei Yehuda in the second qualifying round.

== Squad ==
As of match played 18 May 2013

No.	Name	Nationality	Position	Date of birth (age)	Signed from	Signed in	Contract ends	Apps.	Goals
Goalkeepers
1	Norayr Abrahamyan	(Armenia)	GK	30 October 1985 (aged 27)	Academy	2009			
22	Artur Harutyunyan	(Armenia)	GK	12 August 1985 (aged 27)	Mika	2012		53	0
	Samvel Hakobyan	(Armenia)	GK	18 August 1994 (aged 18)	Academy	2012		0	0
Defenders
3	Armen Ghazaryan	(Armenia)	DF	30 January 1988 (aged 25)	Youth team				
4	Didier Kadio	(Ivory Coast)	DF	5 April 1990 (aged 23)	SO de l'Armée	2012		51	2
13	Samuel Kyere	(Ghana)	DF	6 August 1992 (aged 20)	Berekum Chelsea	2013		12	0
17	Davit Marikyan	(Armenia)	DF	8 May 1993 (aged 20)	Bötzingen	2013		5	0
21	Gevorg Hovhannisyan	(Armenia)	DF	16 June 1983 (aged 29)	Youth team	2003			
23	Artyom Mikaelyan	(Armenia)	DF	12 July 1991 (aged 21)	Youth team	2010		10	0
25	Aghvan Davoyan	(Armenia)	DF	21 March 1990 (aged 23)	Youth team	2010			
34	Arman Tadevosyan	(Armenia)	DF	26 September 1994 (aged 18)	Youth team	2013			
Midfielders
6	Armen Tigranyan	(Armenia)	MF	27 November 1985 (aged 27)	Ulisses	2011		60	0
8	Tigran Davtyan	(Armenia)	MF	10 June 1978 (aged 34)	Ulisses	2009			
10	Davit Hakobyan	(Armenia)	MF	21 March 1993 (aged 20)	Youth team	2010			
11	Levon Pachajyan	(Armenia)	MF	20 September 1983 (aged 29)	Sanat Naft Abadan	2012		28	3
12	Andranik Barikyan	(Armenia)	MF	11 September 1980 (aged 32)	Youth team	1998			
15	Karen Aleksanyan	(Armenia)	MF	17 June 1980 (aged 32)	Ulisses	2011		71	1
18	Ara Mkrtchyan	(Armenia)	MF	3 November 1984 (aged 28)	Youth team	2005			
19	Karen Muradyan	(Armenia)	MF	1 November 1992 (aged 20)	Youth team	2011		61	1
32	Arman Aslanyan	(Armenia)	MF	30 January 1994 (aged 19)	Youth team	2011		0	0
33	Artur Gasparyan	(Armenia)	MF	17 May 1994 (aged 19)	Youth team	2011		0	0
Forwards
5	Yoro Lamine Ly	(Senegal)	FW	27 August 1988 (aged 24)	ASC Niarry Tally	2012		62	22
7	Aram Muradyan	(Armenia)	FW	14 April 1995 (aged 18)	Academy	2013		1	0
14	George Odhiambo	(Kenya)	FW	31 December 1992 (aged 20)	Nairobi City Stars	2013		15	1
27	Aram Tosunyan	(Armenia)	FW	29 May 1993 (aged 19)	Youth team	2011		11	0
29	Dame Diop	(Senegal)	FW	15 February 1993 (aged 20)	Khimki	2013		30	9
31	Edvard Panosyan	(Armenia)	FW	11 October 1992 (aged 20)	Youth team	2013		0	0
Players out on loan
9	Ismaël Fofana	(Ivory Coast)	FW	8 September 1988 (aged 24)	Séwé	2012		37	14
Players who left during the season
2	Hovhannes Grigoryan	(Armenia)	DF	9 March 1985 (aged 28)	Mika	2012		30	1
7	Ararat Harutyunyan	(Armenia)	MF	24 August 1975 (aged 37)	Ulisses	2007			
7	Hrayr Mkoyan	(Armenia)	DF	2 September 1986 (aged 26)	Spartak Nalchik	2012			
17	Mkrtich Nalbandyan	(Armenia)	FW	5 February 1989 (aged 24)	Youth team	2006			
20	Rafael Paltajyan	(Armenia)	DF	2 February 1984 (aged 29)	Youth team	2004			
30	Artur Davtyan	(Armenia)	MF	13 May 1990 (aged 23)	Youth team	2010			
	Haykaz Gevorgyan	(Armenia)	DF	27 May 1993 (aged 19)	Youth team				

== Transfers ==
=== In ===
Date	Position	Nationality	Name	From	Fee	Ref.
1 January 2012	GK	(Armenia)	Artur Harutyunyan	Mika	Undisclosed	
1 January 2012	DF	(Armenia)	Hovhannes Grigoryan	Mika	Undisclosed	
1 February 2012	DF	(Ivory Coast)	Didier Kadio	SO de l'Armée	Undisclosed	
1 January 2012	FW	(Ivory Coast)	Ismaël Fofana	Séwé	Undisclosed	
1 July 2012	DF	(Armenia)	Hrayr Mkoyan	Spartak Nalchik	Undisclosed	
20 August 2012	MF	(Armenia)	Levon Pachajyan	Sanat Naft Abadan	Undisclosed	
Winter 2012	FW	(Senegal)	Yoro Lamine Ly	ASC Niarry Tally	Undisclosed	
28 February 2013	DF	(Armenia)	David Marikjan	Bötzingen	Undisclosed	
28 February 2013	DF	(Ghana)	Samuel Kyere	Berekum Chelsea	Undisclosed	
28 February 2013	FW	(Kenya)	George Odhiambo	Nairobi City Stars	Undisclosed	
21 March 2013	FW	(Senegal)	Dame Diop	Khimki	Undisclosed	

=== Loan in ===
Start date	Position	Nationality	Name	From	End date	Ref.
1 March 2012	FW	(Senegal)	Dame Diop	Khimki	5 August 2012	

=== Out ===
Date	Position	Nationality	Name	From	Fee	Ref.
23 July 2012	DF	(Armenia)	Hovhannes Grigoryan	Ulisses	Undisclosed	
1 January 2013	DF	(Armenia)	Haykaz Gevorgyan	Alashkert	Undisclosed	
20 January 2013	FW	(Armenia)	Mkrtich Nalbandyan	Ulisses	Undisclosed	

=== Loan out ===
Start date	Position	Nationality	Name	To	End date	Ref.
December 2012	FW	(Ivory Coast)	Ismaël Fofana	Zob Ahan	End of season	

=== Released ===
Date	Position	Nationality	Name	Joined	Date
1 January 2013	MF	(Armenia)	Artur Davtyan		
1 January 2013	DF	(Armenia)	Armen Ghazaryan	Retired	
1 January 2013	DF	(Armenia)	Ararat Harutyunyan	Retired	
1 January 2013	DF	(Armenia)	Rafael Paltajyan		
8 February 2013	DF	(Armenia)	Hrayr Mkoyan	Dynamo České Budějovice	
30 June 2013	GK	(Armenia)	Samvel Hakobyan		
30 June 2013	MF	(Armenia)	Levon Pachajyan	Mika	

== Competitions ==
=== Premier League ===
==== Results summary ====
Overall								Home						Away					
Pld	W	D	L	GF	GA	GD	Pts	W	D	L	GF	GA	GD	W	D	L	GF	GA	GD
42	26	10	6	70	38	+32	88	16	3	2	43	20	+23	10	7	4	27	18	+9

Last updated: 18 May 2013.
Source: See Results

==== Results ====
1 April 2012 2	Ararat Yerevan	1 – 2	Shirak	Voskehat
15:00 (UTC+4)	Minasyan (yellow card) 5'; Hakobyan 9'; T.Voskanyan (yellow card) 65'	Report	Hovhannisyan 13'; Fofana 33'; Diop (yellow card) 61'; K.Muradyan (yellow card) 69'	Stadium: Vardanank-451 Stadium; Attendance: 200; Referee: Arman Ghushchyan

7 April 2012 3	Shirak	1 – 0	Ulisses	Gyumri
16:00 (UTC+4)	T.Davtyan (yellow card) 22'; A.Barikyan (yellow card) 40' (goal) 70' (pen.); R.Paltajyan (yellow card) 90+3'	Report	Aragoney (yellow card) 22'; M.Simonyan (yellow card) 69'; M.Afrikyan (yellow card) 69'	Stadium: Gyumri City Stadium; Attendance: 400; Referee: Tigran Hovsepyan

16 April 2012 4	Banants	3 – 0	Shirak	Yerevan
16:00 (UTC+4)	Hambardzumyan 2'; Du Bala 6' (yellow card) 6'; A.Poghosyan (yellow card) 17'; A.Shakhnazaryan 32'; G.Khachatryan (yellow card) 65'	Report	R.Paltajyan (yellow card) 30'; Kadio (yellow card) 42'; Fofana (yellow card) 90+2'	Stadium: Banants Stadium; Attendance: 800; Referee: Sanuk Fahradyan

21 April 2012 5	Shirak	0 – 1	Pyunik	Ijevan
16:00 (UTC+4)		Report	K.Hovhannisyan 52'	Stadium: Arnar Stadium; Attendance: 100; Referee: Suren Baliyan
Note: Match played at the Arnar Stadium in Ijevan instead of Shirak's regular City Stadium in Gyumri.

5 May 2012 7	Shirak	3 – 1	Impuls	Gyumri
17:00 (UTC+4)	Hovhannisyan (yellow card) 19' (yellow-red card) 90+4'; K.Muradyan (yellow card) 25'; Hakobyan 38'; Ly (yellow card) 45+1' (goal) 90+2'; Fofana (yellow card) 55'; A.Mkrtchyan 86'	Report	Ishkhanyan (yellow card) 7'; V.Ayvazyan 26'; Shilla (yellow card) 54' (yellow-red card) 81'; Mandrîcenco (yellow card) 90+4'	Stadium: Gyumri City Stadium; Attendance: 1,500; Referee: Andranik Arsenyan

9 May 2012 6	Gandzasar Kapan	1 – 2	Shirak	Kapan
17:00 (UTC+4)	Y.Keita 23'; H.Avagyan (yellow card) 37'	Report	Kadio (yellow card) 37'; A.Barikyan (yellow card) 49'; A.Sargsyan 53' (o.g.); Ly 81'; H.Grigoryan (yellow card) 84'	Stadium: Gandzasar Stadium; Attendance: 2,200; Referee: Gevorg Eghoyan

13 May 2012 8	Mika	2 – 1	Shirak	Yerevan
17:00 (UTC+4)	Goa (yellow card) 22'; Voskanyan (yellow card) 28'; S.Muradyan 86', 90'	Report	A.Barikyan (yellow card) 16' (goal) 90+2'; A.Mkrtchyan (yellow card) 37'; Kadio (yellow card) 61'	Stadium: Mika Stadium; Attendance: 1,000; Referee: Arman Ghushchyan

16 May 2012 1	Shirak	1 – 1	Mika	Ijevan
17:00 (UTC+4)	Aleksanyan (yellow card) 23' (yellow-red card) 90+1'; A.Barikyan 30'	Report	Goa 18'; V.Movsisyan (yellow card) 44'	Stadium: Arnar Stadium; Attendance: 1,000; Referee: Tigran Hovsepyan

20 May 2012 9	Shirak	4 – 0	Ararat Yerevan	Gyumri
18:00 (UTC+4)	A.Barikyan 5', 51'; Ly (yellow card) 49'; H.Grigoryan (yellow card) 60'; Fofana (yellow card) 70'; M.Nalbandyan 88', 90+2'	Report	T.Voskanyan (yellow card) 63'	Stadium: Gyumri City Stadium; Attendance: 2,500; Referee: Gevorg Eghoyan

27 May 2012 10	Ulisses	1 – 1	Shirak	Yerevan
18:00 (UTC+4)	Sahakyan (yellow card) 43'; D.Grigoryan 45+1'; Krasovski (yellow card) 90+6'	Report	Kadio 80'; K.Muradyan (yellow card) 90+3'	Stadium: Vazgen Sargsyan Republican Stadium; Attendance: 200; Referee: Zaven Hovhannisyan

3 June 2012 11	Shirak	2 – 1	Banants	Gyumri
18:00 (UTC+4)	Ly (yellow card) 44'; M.Nalbandyan 66'; A.Mkrtchyan (yellow card) 79'; Fofana 80'	Report	N.Gyozalyan 90+2'	Stadium: Gyumri City Stadium; Attendance: 1,500; Referee: Tigran Hovsepyan

17 June 2012 13	Shirak	2 – 1	Gandzasar Kapan	Gyumri
18:00 (UTC+4)	Fofana 23'; Ly 46'; T.Davtyan (yellow card) 87'	Report	Yagan (yellow card) 56'; Y.Keita 69'; Kasule (yellow card) 72'; Correia (yellow card) 80'	Stadium: Gyumri City Stadium; Attendance: 2,000; Referee: Arman Ghushchyan

20 June 2012 12	Pyunik	1 – 3	Shirak	Yerevan
18:00 (UTC+4)	Ayvazyan 81'	Report	A.Mkrtchyan 13'; A.Davtyan (yellow card) 15'; Fofana 65'; A.Barikyan 82'	Stadium: Pyunik Training Centre; Attendance: 700; Referee: Zaven Hovhannisyan

23 June 2012 14	Impuls	0 – 2	Shirak	Ararat
18:00 (UTC+4)	E.Kakosyan (yellow card) 55'	Report	Fofana 64'; Ly 72'	Stadium: Ayg Stadium; Attendance: 250; Referee: Suren Baliyan

30 June 2012 15	Shirak	2 – 0	Mika	Gyumri
18:00 (UTC+4)	Fofana 45+1'; Ly 57'	Report		Stadium: Gyumri City Stadium; Attendance: 2,500; Referee: Andranik Arsenyan

29 July 2012 16	Ararat Yerevan	0 – 2	Shirak	Abovyan
18:00 (UTC+4)		Report	Fofana 70'; Ly 80'	Stadium: Abovyan City Stadium; Attendance: 100; Referee: Zaven Hovhannisyan

5 August 2012 17	Shirak	2 – 1	Ulisses	Gyumri
18:00 (UTC+4)	Aleksanyan (yellow card) 47'; K.Muradyan (yellow card) 50'; Fofana (yellow card) 71'; Ly 80', 83'	Report	M.Simonyan (yellow card) 3'; Balabekyan 53'; A.Bareghamyan (yellow card) 57'; Juliano Gimenez (yellow card) 71'; E.Hovhannisyan (yellow card) 80'	Stadium: Gyumri City Stadium; Attendance: 1,500; Referee: Andranik Arsenyan

19 August 2012 19	Shirak	2 – 1	Pyunik	Gyumri
17:00 (UTC+4)	Tigranyan (yellow card) 24' (yellow-red card) 90'; Fofana 26'; Ly 70'; M.Nalbandyan (yellow card) 86'; A.Tosunyan (yellow card) 90+4'	Report	Malakyan 42'	Stadium: Gyumri City Stadium; Attendance: 1,000; Referee: Zaven Hovhannisyan

26 August 2012 20	Gandzasar Kapan	1 – 1	Shirak	Kapan
17:00 (UTC+4)	A.Zaqaryan (yellow card) 18'; Y.Keita (yellow card) 36'; D.Lomba 55'	Report	Mkoyan (yellow card) 15'; Kadio 39'; A.Davoyan (yellow card) 90+3'	Stadium: Gandzasar Stadium; Attendance: 2,000; Referee: Tigran Hovsepyan

2 September 2012 21	Shirak	1 – 1	Impuls	Gyumri
17:00 (UTC+4)	Mkoyan 23'; Davtyan (yellow card) 35'; Ly (yellow card) 86'	Report	A.Barseghyan (yellow card) 36' (goal) 75'; V.Yeghiazaryan (yellow card) 39'	Stadium: Gyumri City Stadium; Attendance: 2,000; Referee: Tigran Hovsepyan

15 September 2012 22	Mika	3 – 1	Shirak	Yerevan
17:00 (UTC+4)	A.Azatyan 23' (yellow card) 90+4'; Alex (yellow card) 32'; Beglaryan 76'; S.Muradyan 84' (yellow card) 86'	Report	Tigranyan (yellow card) 33'; A.Mkrtchyan 44'; Kadio (red card) 84'	Stadium: Mika Stadium; Attendance: 700; Referee: Zaven Hovhannisyan

22 September 2012 23	Shirak	3 – 2	Ararat Yerevan	Gyumri
16:00 (UTC+4)	Fofana 18'; A.Barikyan 28'; A.Mkrtchyan 52'; D.Hakobyan (yellow card) 75'	Report	R.Paltajyan 6' (o.g.); T.Voskanyan 33' (pen.); A.Kirakosyan (yellow card) 81'	Stadium: Gyumri City Stadium; Attendance: 2,000; Referee: Sanuk Fahradyan

30 September 2012 24	Ulisses	0 – 2	Shirak	Yerevan
19:00 (UTC+4)		Report	D.Hakobyan 25', 33'	Stadium: Vazgen Sargsyan Republican Stadium; Attendance: 250; Referee: Suren Baliyan

5 October 2012 25	Shirak	2 – 1	Banants	Gyumri
16:00 (UTC+4)	Fofana 3', 88'; Tigranyan (yellow card) 73'; M.Nalbandyan (yellow card) 76'	Report	A.Kocharyan 45'; K.Harutyunyan (yellow card) 89'	Stadium: Gyumri City Stadium; Attendance: 1,200; Referee: Andranik Arsenyan

28 October 2012 27	Shirak	2 – 0	Gandzasar Kapan	Gyumri
14:00 (UTC+4)	A.Barikyan 5' (pen.) (yellow card) 35'; Fofana 57'	Report	Obradović (yellow card) 5'	Stadium: Gyumri City Stadium; Attendance: 3,000; Referee: Andranik Arsenyan

3 November 2012 28	Impuls	3 – 1	Shirak	Ararat
15:00 (UTC+4)	Gyozalyan 2', 23'; V.Yeghiazaryan (red card) 29'; Hovsepyan 45+2'; Ishkhanyan (yellow card) 70'; A.Khachatryan (yellow card) 90+2'	Report	Tigranyan (yellow card) 27'; K.Muradyan (red card) 34'; A.Barikyan 50'	Stadium: Ayg Stadium; Attendance: 150; Referee: Sanuk Fahradyan

7 November 2012 18	Banants	1 – 1	Shirak	Yerevan
19:00 (UTC+4)	Daghbashyan (yellow card) 27'; A.Arakelyan (yellow card) 61' (yellow-red card) 75'; Dashyan 84'; D.Sujyan (yellow card) 90+3'	Report	A.Barikyan 53' (pen.)	Stadium: Banants Stadium; Attendance: 200; Referee: Arman Ghushchyan

11 November 2012 29	Shirak	3 – 0	Mika	Gyumri
15:00 (UTC+4)	Pachajyan 59'; Mkoyan (yellow card) 61'; Ly 70'; A.Barikyan 76'	Report	Mkrtchyan (yellow card) 58'	Stadium: Gyumri City Stadium; Attendance: 1,500; Referee: Andranik Arsenyan

17 November 2012 30	Ararat Yerevan	0 – 1	Shirak	Abovyan
14:00 (UTC+4)	D.G.Grigoryan (yellow card) 60'	Report	Ly 52'; R.Paltajyan (yellow card) 90+3'	Stadium: Abovyan City Stadium; Attendance: 250; Referee: Suren Baliyan

21 November 2012 26	Pyunik	1 – 2	Shirak	Yerevan
18:00 (UTC+4)	Haroyan (yellow card) 24'; A.Melkonian (yellow card) 44'; D.Minasyan 62'	Report	Fofana (yellow card) 24' (goal) 68'; Pachajyan 56'	Stadium: Vazgen Sargsyan Republican Stadium; Attendance: 250; Referee: Zaven Hovhannisyan

25 November 2012 31	Shirak	2 – 0	Ulisses	Gyumri
14:00 (UTC+4)	A.Barikyan (yellow card) 28'; D.Hakobyan 39'; M.Nalbandyan 78'	Report	Sahakyan (yellow card) 31'; T.Hakhnazaryan (yellow card) 66'	Stadium: Gyumri City Stadium; Attendance: 2,000; Referee: Suren Baliyan

3 December 2012 32	Banants	2 – 2	Shirak	Yerevan
14:00 (UTC+4)	Hambardzumyan 1'; A.Arakelyan 5'; S.Karapetyan (yellow card) 54'	Report	Fofana 42'; Aleksanyan (yellow card) 45+1'; Muradyan (yellow card) 54'; Ly 55'	Stadium: Banants Stadium; Attendance: 500; Referee: Suren Baliyan

9 March 2013 33	Shirak	0 – 1	Pyunik	Gyumri
15:00 (UTC+4)		Report	S.Baloyan (yellow card) 36'; V.Minasyan (yellow card) 69'; Yuspashyan 87'	Stadium: Gyumri City Stadium; Attendance: 300; Referee: Gevorg Eghoyan

17 March 2013 34	Gandzasar Kapan	0 – 0	Shirak	Kapan
15:00 (UTC+4)	Dashyan (yellow card) 26'; Pottker (yellow card) 32'; Beglaryan (yellow card) 52'	Report	Kadio (yellow card) 32'; Kyere (yellow card) 32'; T.Davtyan (yellow card) 73'	Stadium: Gandzasar Stadium; Attendance: 2,500; Referee: Tigran Hovsepyan

30 March 2013 35	Shirak	4 – 3	Impuls	Gyumri
15:00 (UTC+4)	Diop 13'; Odhiambo 34'; K.Muradyan 70'; Kyere (yellow card) 78'; Ly 83'; Art.Harutyunyan (yellow card) 90+2'	Report	Hovsepyan 12'; Timov (yellow card) 41'; V.Ayvazyan (yellow card) 45' (goal) 90'; A.Barseghyan 69'	Stadium: Gyumri City Stadium; Attendance: 3,000; Referee: Suren Baliyan

7 April 2013 36	Mika	0 – 0	Shirak	Yerevan
16:00 (UTC+4)	V.Movsisyan (yellow card) 7'	Report	Muradyan (yellow card) 9'	Stadium: Mika Stadium; Attendance: 450; Referee: Andranik Arsenyan

13 April 2013 37	Shirak	3 – 1	Ararat Yerevan	Gyumri
16:00 (UTC+4)	Ly 29', 85'; T.Davtyan (yellow card) 51'; Diop 54'	Report	K.Veranyan 34'; V.Martirosyan (yellow card) 51'; D.G.Grigoryan (yellow card) 55'; N.Grigoryan (yellow card) 57'	Stadium: Gyumri City Stadium; Attendance: 1,000; Referee: Arman Ghushchyan

21 April 2013 38	Ulisses	0 – 0	Shirak	Yerevan
16:00 (UTC+4)	A.Boiajyan (yellow card) 56'	Report	Aleksanyan (yellow card) 20'	Stadium: Vazgen Sargsyan Republican Stadium; Attendance: 300; Referee: Zaven Hovhannisyan

27 April 2013 39	Shirak	2 – 0	Banants	Gyumri
17:00 (UTC+4)	Hakobyan 18'; Ly 23' (pen.); Hovhannisyan (yellow card) 55'	Report	N.Minasyan (red card) 23'; A.Arakelyan (yellow card) 51'	Stadium: Gyumri City Stadium; Attendance: 1,200; Referee: Tigran Hovsepyan

3 May 2013 40	Pyunik	0 – 1	Shirak	Yerevan
19:00 (UTC+4)	Voskanyan (yellow card) 63'; S.Baloyan (yellow card) 71'; Haroyan (yellow card) 84'	Report	Ly 82'; Pachajyan (yellow card) 90+6'	Stadium: Yerevan Football Academy Stadium; Attendance: 800; Referee: Zaven Hovhannisyan

12 May 2013 41	Shirak	2 – 2	Gandzasar Kapan	Gyumri
15:00 (UTC+4)	Diop 45' (yellow card) 45'; A.Barikyan (yellow card) 57'; T.Davtyan (yellow card) 64'; Ly 81' (pen.) (yellow card) 81'	Report	Obradović (yellow card) 11'; Melkonyan 52'; Beglaryan (yellow card) 54' (goal) 62'; D.Diakaridia (yellow card) 63'	Stadium: Gyumri City Stadium; Attendance: 1,500; Referee: Sanuk Fahradyan

18 May 2013 42	Impuls	0 – 2	Shirak	Ararat
17:00 (UTC+4)	Mandrîcenco (yellow card) 6'	Report	Aleksanyan (yellow card) 6'; Diop 13'; Pachajyan 45'; K.Muradyan (yellow card) 76'	Stadium: Ayg Stadium; Attendance: 50; Referee: Suren Baliyan

==== Table ====
Pos	Team	Pld	W	D	L	GF	GA	GD	Pts	Qualification
1	Shirak (C)	42	26	10	6	70	38	+32	88	Qualification for the Champions League first qualifying round
2	Mika	42	24	7	11	57	39	+18	79	Qualification for the Europa League first qualifying round (Note: Pyunik, as winners of 2012–13 Armenian Cup, qualify for the first qualifying round of the UEFA Europa League.)
3	Gandzasar Kapan	42	18	13	11	48	37	+11	67	Qualification for the Europa League first qualifying round
4	Pyunik	42	19	6	17	67	51	+16	63	Qualification for the Europa League first qualifying round
5	Impuls	42	18	6	18	66	65	+1	60	Team disbanded after the season (Note: Impuls FC decided not to participate in 2013–14 Armenian Premier League competition, as the team was dissolved by the decision of the owners.)

Source: Football Federation of Armenia
Rules for classification: 1) points; 2) goal difference; 3) number of goals scored.
(C) Champions

=== Armenian Cup ===
==== 2011–12 ====
18 March 2012 Semifinal 1st leg	Shirak	0 – 1	Mika	Ijevan
15:00 (UTC+4)	T.Davtyan (yellow card) 45'; Tigranyan (yellow card) 75'; A.Barikyan (yellow card) 86'	Report	A.Azatyan (yellow card) 38' (goal) 67'	Stadium: Arnar Stadium; Attendance: 2,000; Referee: Andranik Arsenyan
Note: Match played at the Arnar Stadium in Ijevan instead of Shirak's regular City Stadium in Gyumri.

12 April 2012 Semifinal 2nd leg	Mika	1 – 2 (2 – 2 agg.)	Shirak	Yerevan
16:00 (UTC+4)	S.Shahinyan (yellow card) 29'; A.Azatyan (yellow card) 36'; A.Adamyan 54' (yellow card) 82'; A.Mkrtchyan (yellow card) 54'; Kasparov (yellow card) 55'; Ge.Poghosyan (yellow card) 62'; Voskanyan (yellow card) 90+1'	Report	Diop (yellow card) 36' (goal) 71', 79'; A.Barikyan (yellow card) 74' (yellow-red card) 90+1'; Art.Harutyunyan (yellow card) 85'	Stadium: RCCSD Stadium; Attendance: 1,500; Referee: Suren Baliyan

===== Final =====
29 April 2012	Shirak	1 – 0	Impuls	Gyumri
16:30 (UTC+4)	Ly 38'; A.Barikyan (yellow card) 81'; Aleksanyan (yellow card) 86' (yellow-red card) 90'	Report	V.Yeghiazaryan (yellow card) 71'	Stadium: Gyumri City Stadium; Attendance: 3,500; Referee: Andrea de Marco

==== 2012–13 ====
3 March 2013 Quarterfinal 1st leg	Shirak	1 – 0	Ararat Yerevan	Ijevan
14:00 (UTC+4)	Diop 3'; Ly (yellow card) 11'; Kyere (yellow card) 73'	Report	A.Kirakosyan (yellow card) 25'	Stadium: Arnar Stadium; Attendance: 300; Referee: Arman Ghushchyan
Note: Match played at the Arnar Stadium in Ijevan instead of Shirak's regular City Stadium in Gyumri.

13 March 2013 Quarterfinal 2nd leg	Ararat Yerevan	0 – 0 (0 – 1 agg.)	Shirak	Abovyan
14:00 (UTC+4)		Report	Odhiambo (yellow card) 45'; Tigranyan (yellow card) 70'; A.Barikyan (yellow card) 78'	Stadium: Abovyan City Stadium; Attendance: 300; Referee: Andranik Arsenyan

3 April 2013 Semifinal 1st leg	Mika	0 – 1	Shirak	Yerevan
16:00 (UTC+4)	Voskanyan (yellow card) 24'; A.Petrosyan (yellow card) 56'	Report	Kadio (yellow card) 33'; Hovhannisyan (yellow card) 36'; Diop 75'	Stadium: RCCSD Stadium; Attendance: 800; Referee: Tigran Hovsepyan

16 April 2013 Semifinal 2nd leg	Shirak	0 – 0 (1 – 0 agg.)	Mika	Gyumri
16:00 (UTC+4)	Tigranyan (yellow card) 50'; Pachajyan (yellow card) 73'; Kyere (yellow card) 77'	Report	V.Satumyan (yellow card) 53'; V.Movsisyan (yellow card) 75'	Stadium: Gyumri City Stadium; Attendance: 500; Referee: Suren Baliyan

===== Final =====
7 May 2013	Pyunik	1 – 0	Shirak	Yerevan
19:00 (UTC+4)	Voskanyan 39'; Manukyan (yellow card) 82'	Report		Stadium: Hrazdan Stadium; Attendance: 2,500; Referee: Andranik Arsenyan

=== UEFA Europa League ===
==== Qualifying rounds ====
5 July 2012 First Qualifying Round 1st leg	Rudar Pljevlja (Montenegro)	0 – 1	(Armenia) Shirak	Nikšić, Montenegro
20:00 (UTC+4)	Adžić (yellow card) 45+1'; Kaluđerović (yellow card) 50'	Report	Ly (yellow card) 28' (goal) 71'; Fofana (yellow card) 39'; K.Muradyan (yellow card) 62'; T.Davtyan (yellow card) 63'; Tigranyan (yellow card) 90+3'	Stadium: Gradski stadion Attendance: 400; Referee: Jari Järvinen (Finland)
Note: Match played at the Gradski stadion, Nikšić instead of Rudar Pljevlja's regular stadium, Gradski stadion, Pljevlja.

12 July 2012 First Qualifying Round 2nd leg	Shirak (Armenia)	1 – 1 (2 – 1 agg.)	(Montenegro) Rudar Pljevlja	Gyumri, Armenia
18:00 (UTC+4)	Diop 14'; Kadio (yellow card) 48'; A.Barikyan (yellow card) 59'	Report	Mkoyan 11' (o.g.); Kaluđerović (yellow card) 39'; P.Brnović (yellow card) 56'	Stadium: Gyumri City Stadium; Attendance: 2,655; Referee: Nerijus Dunauskas (Lithuania)

19 July 2012 Second Qualifying Round 1st leg	Bnei Yehuda (Israel)	2 – 0	(Armenia) Shirak	Ramat Gan, Israel
21:00 (UTC+4)	Hadad (red card) 45+1'; Cohen (yellow card) 70'; Ndlovu 82'; Galván 90+4'	Report	Kadio (yellow card) 20'; A.Barikyan (red card) 76'	Stadium: Ramat Gan Stadium; Attendance: 1,890; Referee: Richard Liesveld (Netherlands)
Note: Match played at the Ramat Gan Stadium, Ramat Gan instead of Bnei Yehuda's regular stadium, Bloomfield Stadium, Tel Aviv.

26 July 2012 Second Qualifying Round 2nd leg	Shirak (Armenia)	0 – 1 (0 – 3 agg.)	(Israel) Bnei Yehuda	Gyumri, Armenia
17:30 (UTC+4)	Tigranyan (yellow card) 21'; Mkoyan (yellow card) 43'	Report	Abu Zaid (yellow card) 27'; Menashe 31'; L.Bargig (yellow card) 44'	Stadium: Gyumri City Stadium; Attendance: 2,500; Referee: Ilias Spathas (Greece)

== Statistics ==
As of match played 18 May 2013

=== Appearances and goals ===
No.	Pos	Nat	Player	Total		Premier League		Armenian Cup		Armenian Cup		UEFA Europa League	
No.	Pos	Nat	Player	Apps	Goals	Apps	Goals	Apps	Goals	Apps	Goals	Apps	Goals
1	GK	(Armenia) ARM	Norayr Abrahamyan	1	0	1	0	0	0	0	0	0	0
3	DF	(Armenia) ARM	Armen Ghazaryan	1	0	0	0	1	0	0	0	0	0
4	DF	(Ivory Coast) CIV	Didier Kadio	51	2	39	2	3	0	5	0	4	0
5	FW	(Senegal) SEN	Yoro Lamine Ly	50	20	33+6	18	2+1	1	1+3	0	4	1
6	MF	(Armenia) ARM	Armen Tigranyan	34	0	15+9	0	1+1	0	4	0	2+2	0
7	FW	(Armenia) ARM	Aram Muradyan	1	0	0+1	0	0	0	0	0	0	0
8	MF	(Armenia) ARM	Tigran Davtyan	47	0	34+2	0	3	0	2+2	0	3+1	0
10	MF	(Armenia) ARM	Davit Hakobyan	48	5	26+11	5	3	0	4	0	1+3	0
11	MF	(Armenia) ARM	Levon Pachajyan	28	3	14+9	3	0	0	4+1	0	0	0
12	MF	(Armenia) ARM	Andranik Barikyan	45	11	27+8	11	3	0	3+1	0	2+1	0
13	DF	(Ghana) GHA	Samuel Kyere	12	0	7	0	0	0	5	0	0	0
14	FW	(Kenya) KEN	George Odhiambo	15	1	6+4	1	0	0	3+2	0	0	0
15	MF	(Armenia) ARM	Karen Aleksanyan	39	0	32+2	0	3	0	2	0	0	0
17	DF	(Armenia) ARM	Davit Marikyan	5	0	3	0	0	0	0+2	0	0	0
18	MF	(Armenia) ARM	Ara Mkrtchyan	45	4	19+16	4	1+2	0	2+1	0	1+3	0
19	MF	(Armenia) ARM	Karen Muradyan	51	1	37+4	1	2	0	3+1	0	4	0
21	DF	(Armenia) ARM	Gevorg Hovhannisyan	48	1	32+4	1	3	0	5	0	4	0
22	GK	(Armenia) ARM	Artur Harutyunyan	53	0	41	0	3	0	5	0	4	0
23	DF	(Armenia) ARM	Artyom Mikaelyan	1	0	1	0	0	0	0	0	0	0
25	DF	(Armenia) ARM	Aghvan Davoyan	22	0	11+7	0	0	0	3	0	0+1	0
27	FW	(Armenia) ARM	Aram Tosunyan	6	0	0+5	0	0	0	0+1	0	0	0
29	FW	(Senegal) SEN	Dame Diop	30	9	15+4	4	1+1	2	4+1	2	4	1
Players away on loan:
9	FW	(Ivory Coast) CIV	Ismaël Fofana	37	14	29+1	14	1+2	0	0	0	4	0
Players who left Shirak during the season:
2	DF	(Armenia) ARM	Hovhannes Grigoryan	17	0	12+1	0	1+1	0	0	0	2	0
7	MF	(Armenia) ARM	Ararat Harutyunyan	8	0	3+3	0	1+1	0	0	0	0	0
7	DF	(Armenia) ARM	Hrayr Mkoyan	22	0	18	0	0	0	0	0	4	0
17	FW	(Armenia) ARM	Mkrtich Nalbandyan	20	4	0+19	4	0	0	0	0	0+1	0
20	DF	(Armenia) ARM	Rafael Paltajyan	7	0	5	0	1	0	0	0	1	0
30	MF	(Armenia) ARM	Artur Davtyan	6	0	2+4	0	0	0	0	0	0	0

=== Goal scorers ===
Place	Position	Nation	Number	Name	Premier League	2011–12 Armenian Cup	2012–13 Armenian Cup	UEFA Europa League	Total
1	FW	(Senegal)	5	Yoro Lamine Ly	18	1	0	1	20
2	FW	(Ivory Coast)	9	Ismaël Fofana	14	0	0	0	14
3	FW	(Armenia)	12	Andranik Barikyan	11	0	0	0	11
4	FW	(Senegal)	29	Dame Diop	4	2	2	1	9
5	MF	(Armenia)	10	Davit Hakobyan	5	0	0	0	5
6	FW	(Armenia)	17	Mkrtich Nalbandyan	4	0	0	0	4
6	MF	(Armenia)	18	Ara Mkrtchyan	4	0	0	0	4
8	MF	(Armenia)	11	Levon Pachajyan	3	0	0	0	3
9	DF	(Ivory Coast)	4	Didier Kadio	2	0	0	0	2
9				Own goal	2	0	0	0	2
11	DF	(Armenia)	7	Hrayr Mkoyan	1	0	0	0	1
11	DF	(Armenia)	21	Gevorg Hovhannisyan	1	0	0	0	1
11	MF	(Armenia)	19	Karen Muradyan	1	0	0	0	1
11	FW	(Kenya)	14	George Odhiambo	1	0	0	0	1
				TOTALS	70	3	2	2	77

=== Clean sheets ===
Place	Position	Nation	Number	Name	Premier League	2011–12 Armenian Cup	2012–13 Armenian Cup	UEFA Europa League	Total
1	GK	(Armenia)	22	Artur Harutyunyan	15	1	4	1	21
2	GK	(Armenia)	1	Norayr Abrahamyan	1	0	0	0	1
				TOTALS	16	1	4	1	22

=== Disciplinary record ===
Number	Nation	Position	Name	Premier League		2011–12 Armenian Cup		2012–13 Armenian Cup		UEFA Europa League		Total	
Number	Nation	Position	Name	Yellow card	Red card	Yellow card	Red card	Yellow card	Red card	Yellow card	Red card	Yellow card	Red card
4	(Ivory Coast)	DF	Didier Kadio	4	1	0	0	1	0	2	0	7	1
5	(Senegal)	FW	Yoro Lamine Ly	5	0	0	0	1	0	1	0	7	0
6	(Armenia)	MF	Armen Tigranyan	5	1	1	0	2	0	2	0	10	1
8	(Armenia)	MF	Tigran Davtyan	6	0	1	0	0	0	1	0	8	0
10	(Armenia)	MF	Davit Hakobyan	1	0	0	0	0	0	0	0	1	0
11	(Armenia)	MF	Levon Pachajyan	1	0	0	0	1	0	0	0	2	0
12	(Armenia)	MF	Andranik Barikyan	6	0	4	1	1	0	1	1	12	2
13	(Ghana)	DF	Samuel Kyere	2	0	0	0	2	0	0	0	4	0
14	(Kenya)	FW	George Odhiambo	0	0	0	0	1	0	0	0	1	0
15	(Armenia)	MF	Karen Aleksanyan	6	1	2	1	0	0	0	0	8	2
18	(Armenia)	MF	Ara Mkrtchyan	2	0	0	0	0	0	0	0	2	0
19	(Armenia)	MF	Karen Muradyan	7	1	0	0	0	0	1	0	8	1
21	(Armenia)	DF	Gevorg Hovhannisyan	3	1	0	0	1	0	0	0	4	1
22	(Armenia)	GK	Artur Harutyunyan	1	0	1	0	0	0	0	0	1	0
23	(Armenia)	DF	Artyom Mikaelyan	1	0	0	0	0	0	0	0	1	0
25	(Armenia)	DF	Aghvan Davoyan	1	0	0	0	0	0	0	0	1	0
27	(Armenia)	FW	Aram Tosunyan	1	0	0	0	0	0	0	0	1	0
29	(Senegal)	FW	Dame Diop	2	0	1	0	0	0	0	0	3	0
Players away on loan:
9	(Ivory Coast)	FW	Ismaël Fofana	5	0	0	0	0	0	1	0	6	0
Players who left Shirak during the season:
2	(Armenia)	DF	Hovhannes Grigoryan	2	0	0	0	0	0	2	0		
7	(Armenia)	DF	Hrayr Mkoyan	2	0	0	0	0	0	1	0	3	0
17	(Armenia)	FW	Mkrtich Nalbandyan	2	0	0	0	0	0	0	0	2	0
20	(Armenia)	DF	Rafael Paltajyan	3	0	0	0	0	0	0	0	1	0
30	(Armenia)	MF	Artur Davtyan	1	0	0	0	0	0	0	0	1	0
			TOTALS	69	5	10	2	10	0	10	1	99	8
