= Ayanda (given name) =

Ayanda is a given name, derived from the Nguni word ukwanda/kwandile, meaning "to increase/multiply/to grow/expand.". Notable people with the name include:

- Ayanda Bans, South African politician
- Ayanda Borotho (born 1981), South African actress
- Ayanda Daweti (born 1990), South African actor and musician
- Ayanda Denge (1982–2019), South African transgender activist
- Ayanda Dlamini (born 1984), South African footballer
- Ayanda Dlodlo, South African politician
- Ayanda Dube (born 1989), Swazi model
- Ayanda Gcaba (born 1986), South African footballer
- Ayanda Hlubi (born 2004), South African cricketer
- Ayanda Jiya (born 1987), South African singer
- Ayanda Kota (1976–2024), South African activist
- Ayanda Lubelo (born 1992), South African footballer
- Ayanda Mabulu (born 1981), South African artist
- Ayanda Malinga (born 1998), South African rugby player
- Ayanda Ndulani (born 1997), South African boxer
- Ayanda Ngila (1992–2022), South African land activist
- Ayanda Nkili (born 1990), South African footballer
- Ayanda Nkosi (born 1993), South African footballer
- Ayanda Patosi (born 1992), South African footballer
- Ayanda Sishuba (born 2005), Belgian footballer
