= Ahmed Younis =

Ahmed Younis may refer to:

- Ahmed Younis (footballer)
- Ahmed Younis (journalist)
