= Alagie =

Alagie is a Gambian given name. Notable people with the name include:

- Alagie Barra Njie (born 2001), Swedish basketball player
- Alagie Barrow (fl. 2001-present), Gambian-American Army National Guard officer
- Alagie Modou Jobe (born 1988), Gambian football goalkeeper
- Alagie Nyabally (born 1991), Gambian football goalkeeper
- Alagie Saine (born 2003), Gambian football centre-back
- Alagie Sanyang (born 1996), Gambian football striker
- Alagie Sarr (born 1999), Gambian football midfielder
- Alagie Sosseh (born 1986), Gambian football forward
- Alagie Wally (born 2006), Gambian football forward
