= Salagi Forest Park =

Forest park in Gambia

- IUCN category IV (habitat/species management area)
- Interactive map of Salagi Forest Park
- Location: Western Division Gambia
- Nearest city: Sukuta
- Coordinates: 13°22′36″N 16°42′43″W
- Area: 262 ha (650 acres)
- Established: January 1, 1954

Salagi Forest Park is a forest park in the Gambia. Established on January 1, 1954, it covers 262 hectares.

It is located in the west of the country, at an altitude of 26 meters.
