= Gevorg Grigoryan (Giotto) =

Armenian artist (1897–1976)

- Գևորգ Գրիգորյան
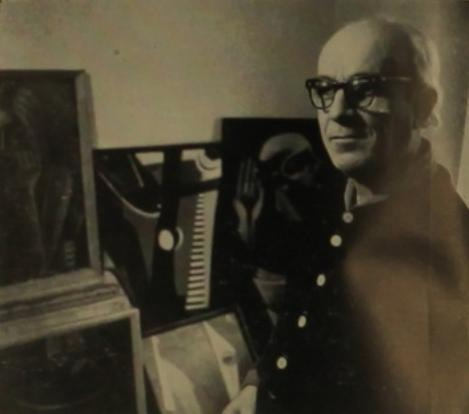
- Grigoryan in his studio
- Born: 12 November [O.S. 24 November] 1897; Tiflis, Russian Empire
- Died: 23 November 1976 (aged 78); Yerevan, Armenian SSR, Soviet Union
- Education: Vkhutemas
- Known for: Painter, graphic artist
- Notable work: Death of the Leader, Portrait of Haykuhi, Still Life with a White Vase, and Komitas
- Spouse: Diana Ukleba
- Awards: Honored Artist of the Armenian SSR

Gevorg Grigoryan (known under the pseudonym Giotto) (November 12 (November 24, 1897, Tiflis, Russian Empire — November 23, 1976, Yerevan, Armenian SSR, USSR) was an Armenian painter, and graphic artist, Honored Artist of the Armenian SSR (1967).

== Biography ==
Grigoryan was born in a poor family. He was six years old when his father died. From an early age, he was fascinated by the classics of Renaissance art: Giotto di Bondone, Leonardo da Vinci, Raphael Santi, El Greco, Luis de Morales, the Armenian art and started to paint. From 1916 to 1920, he studied at the School of Painting and Sculpture of the Caucasian Society for the Encouragement of fine arts in Tiflis, where he studied with Yeghishe Tadevosyan.

In 1921, along with a group of young artists led by Suren Khachatryan (Aram Khachaturian's brother), he left for Moscow to study.

He studied at the Vkhutemas (Moscow Higher Art Studios) and joined the Hayartun Artists' Union.

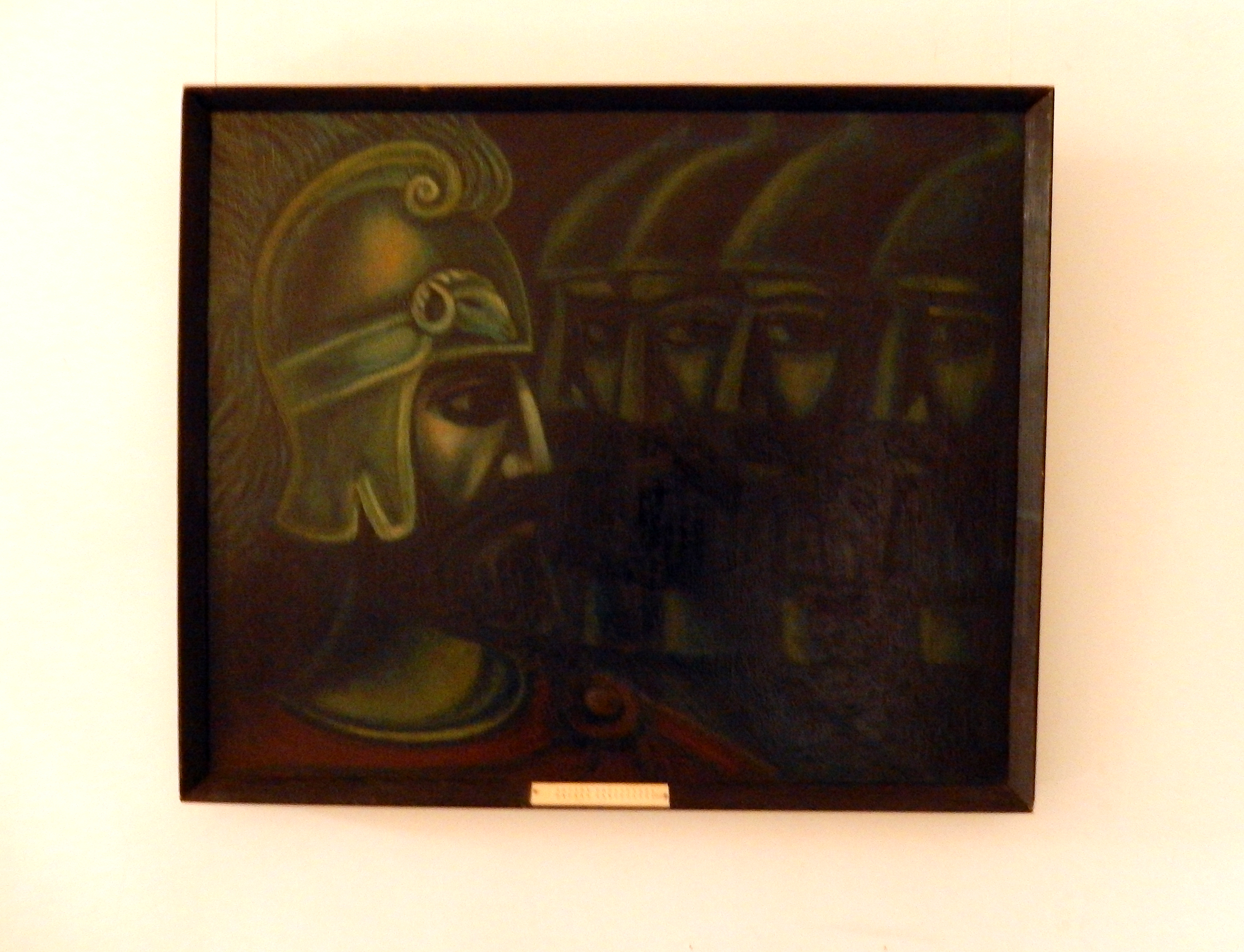
Giotto's work

From 1923, he began teaching painting at labor schools in Tbilisi. In 1948, years of persecution began. The artist, in despair and hopelessness, burned 300 paintings. From 1948 to 1957, he was expelled from the Georgian Artists' Union. In 1962, Giotto moved to Yerevan.

In 1977, the Gevorg Grigoryan (Giotto) Studio-Museum was founded in Yerevan (Mashtotsi Ave. 45A). His works are in the Gevorg Grigoryan Studio-Museum, the Modern Art Museum of Yerevan, the National Gallery of Armenia, the State Museum of Oriental Art, the Zimmerli Museum, as well as in numerous private collections worldwide.

== Works ==
Gevorg Grigoryan created portraits, still lifes, and landscapes distinguished by their unique color palette and linear structure, demonstrating his artistic inclination to express deep emotions through restrained colors. "I paint with my nerves and blood and that the most essential element in art is sincerity", he said. The unique cultural atmosphere of Tbilisi, the Armenian people's past, and prominent figures of Russian, Georgian, and Armenian culture are reflected in Grigoryan's middle-scale works. His canvases are distinguished by the restrained beauty and figurative diversity characteristic of the Tbilisi Armenian school of painting.

== Famous works ==
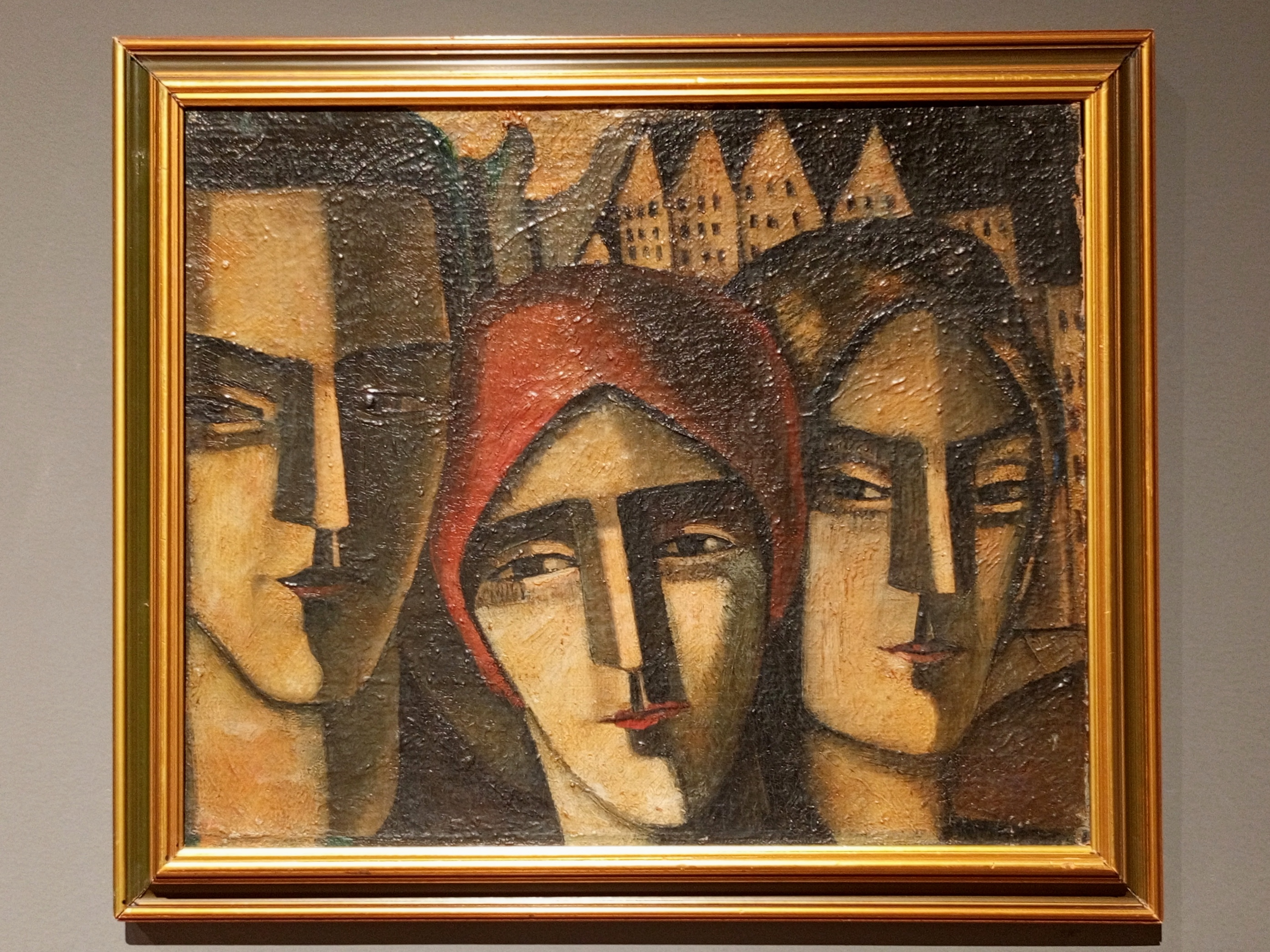
Death of the Leader by Gevorg Grigoryan (Giotto), 1927

- "Still Life with a White Napkin", 1922
- "Portrait of Haykuhi", 1922
- "Young Charents", 1926
- "Manushak", 1929
- "Portrait of Composer Armen Tigranyan", 1925
- "Girl with a Fan", 1926
- "Stepan Shaumyan", 1926
- "Still Life with a White Vase", 1928
- "Death of the Leader", 1927
- "Portrait of Diana", 1945
- "Three Artists" (Lado Gudiashvili, Vano Khojabekyan, Niko Pirosmani), 1959,
- "Tiflis Landscape", 1966,
- "My Mother and I", 1972.

== Gallery ==
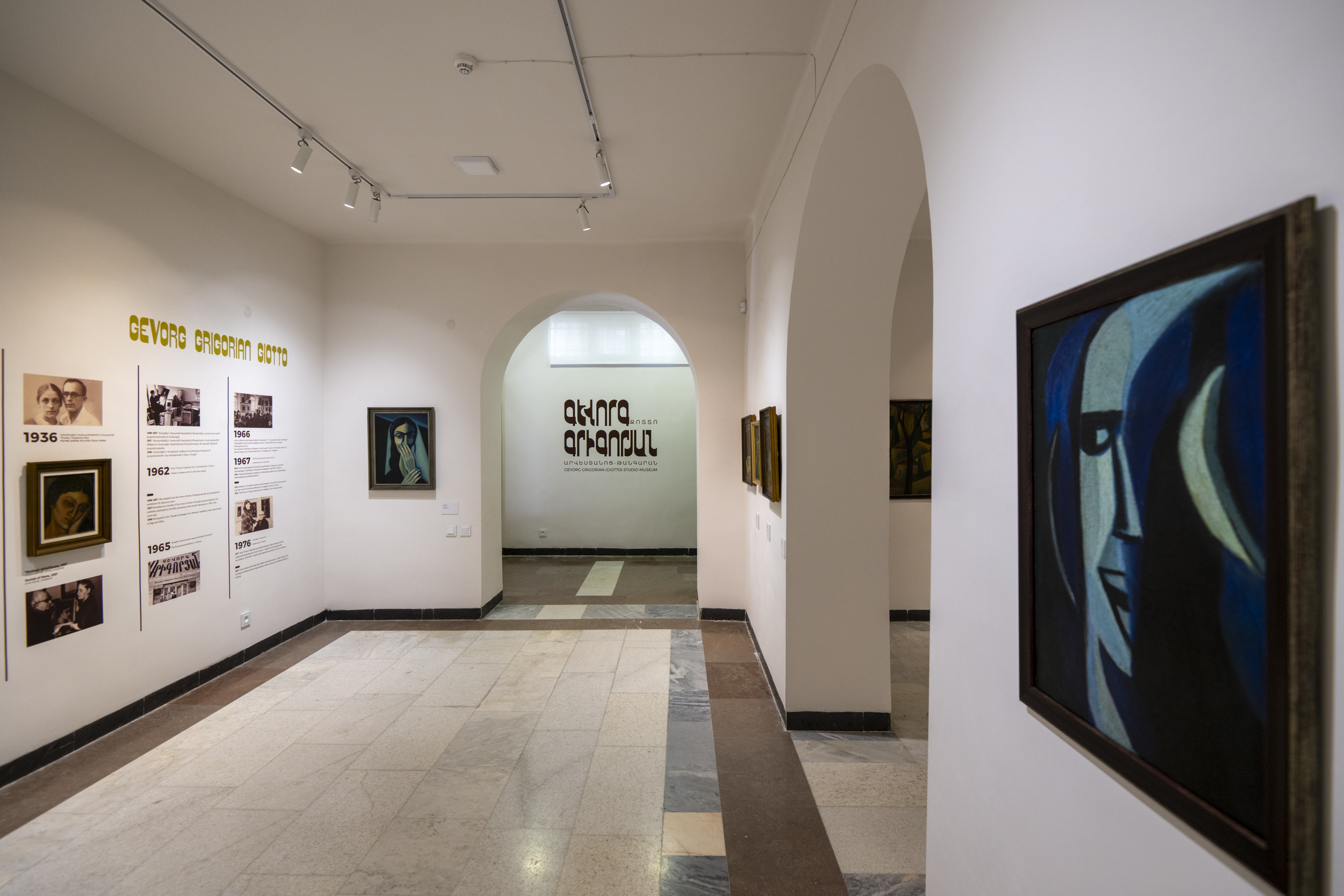

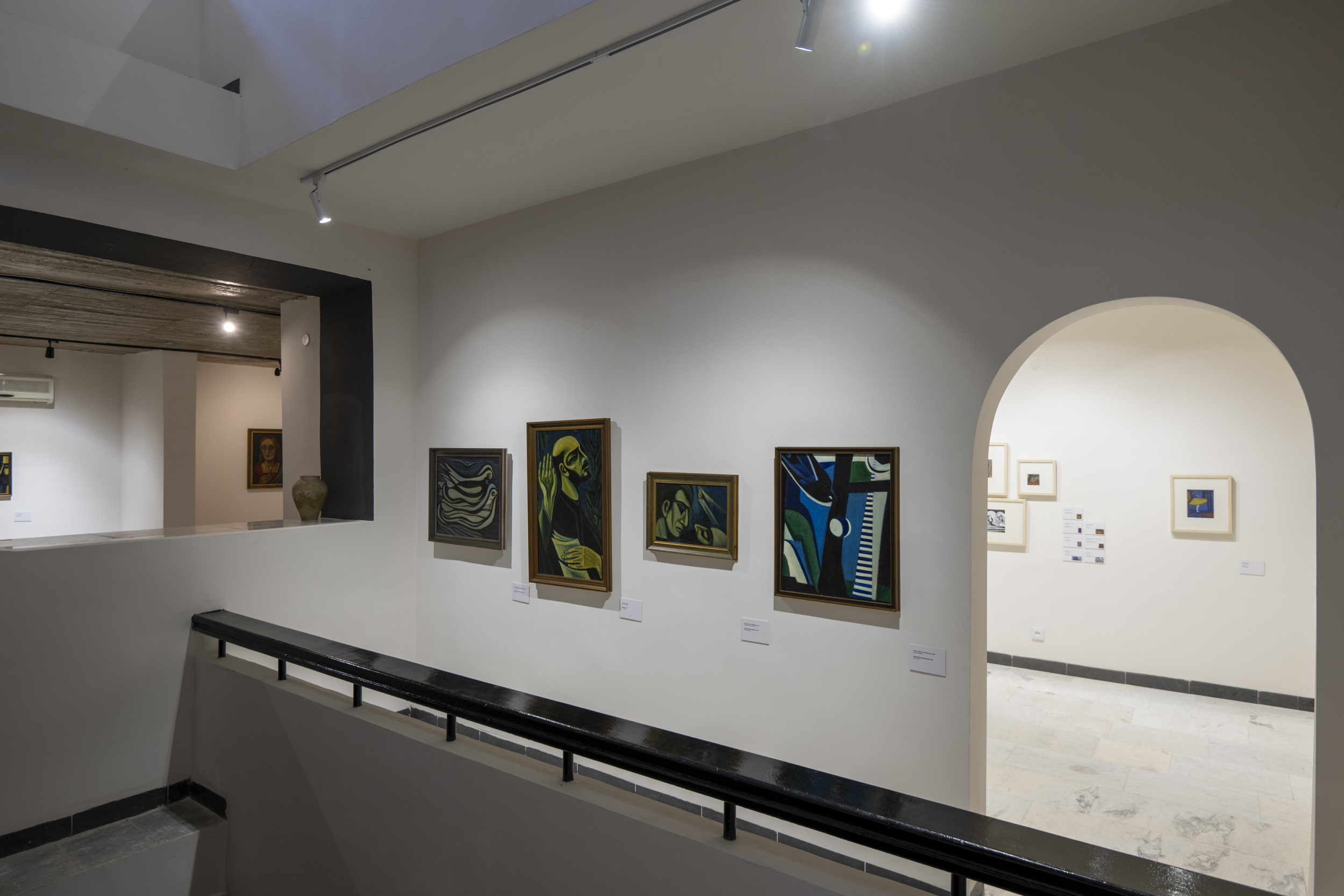

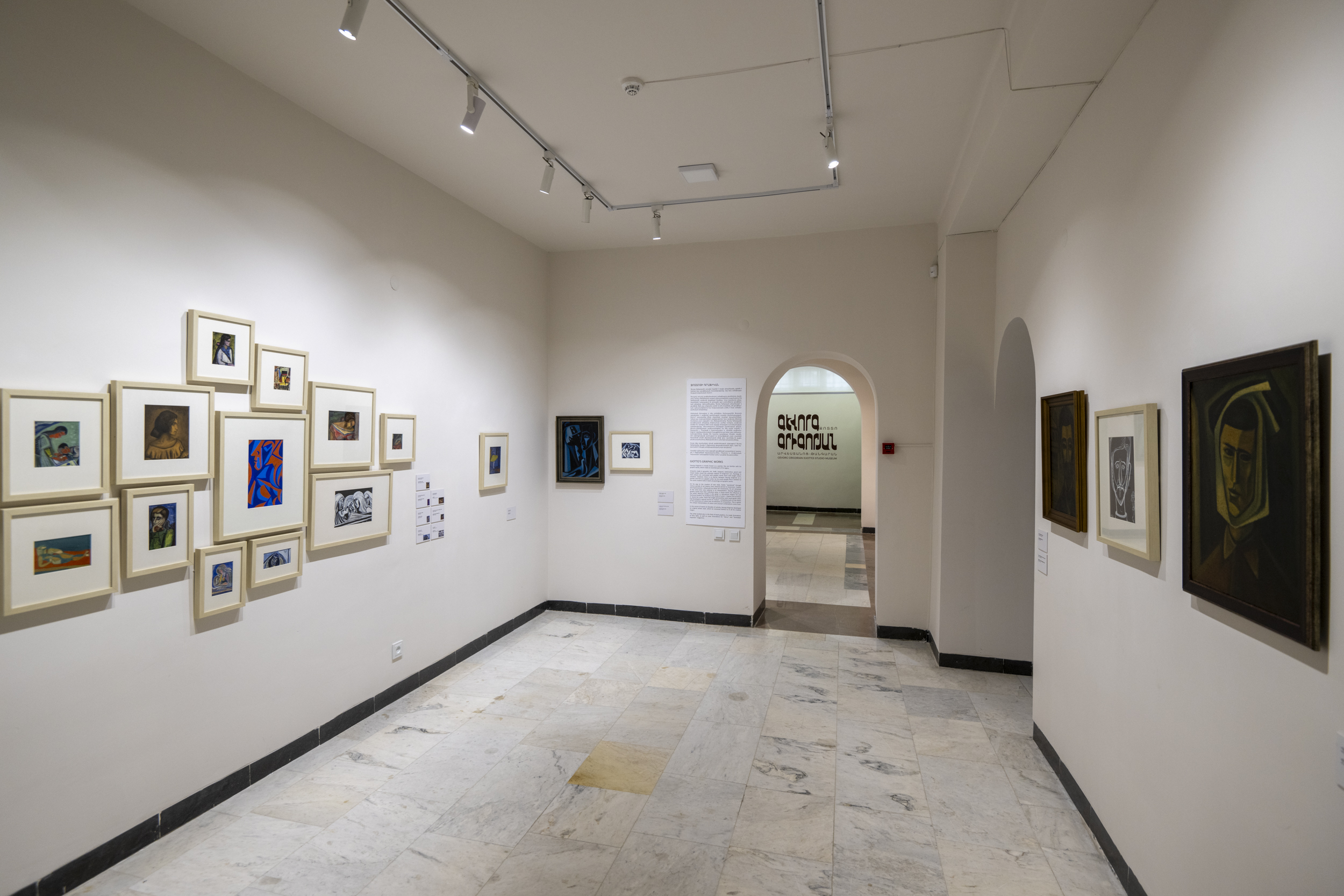

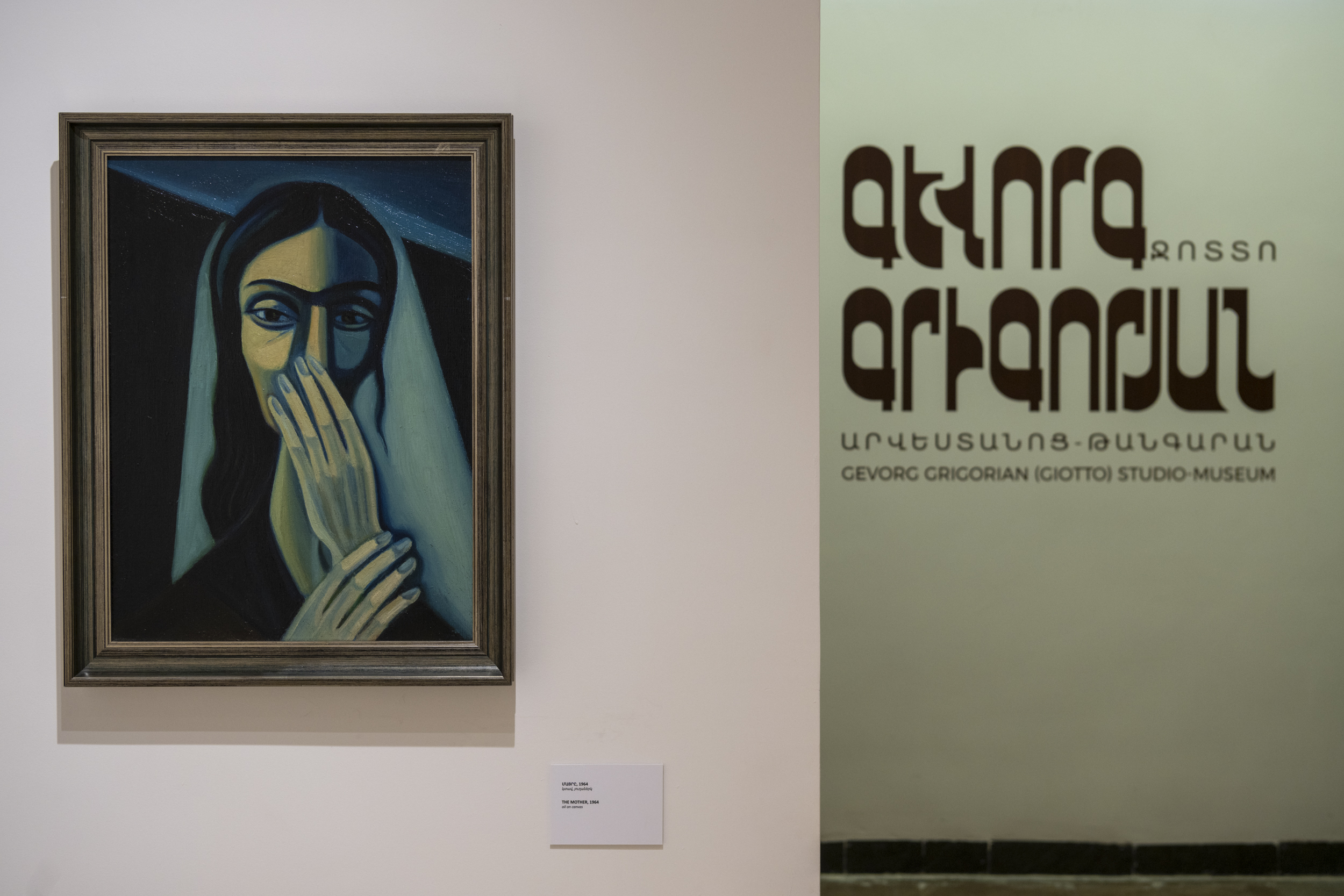

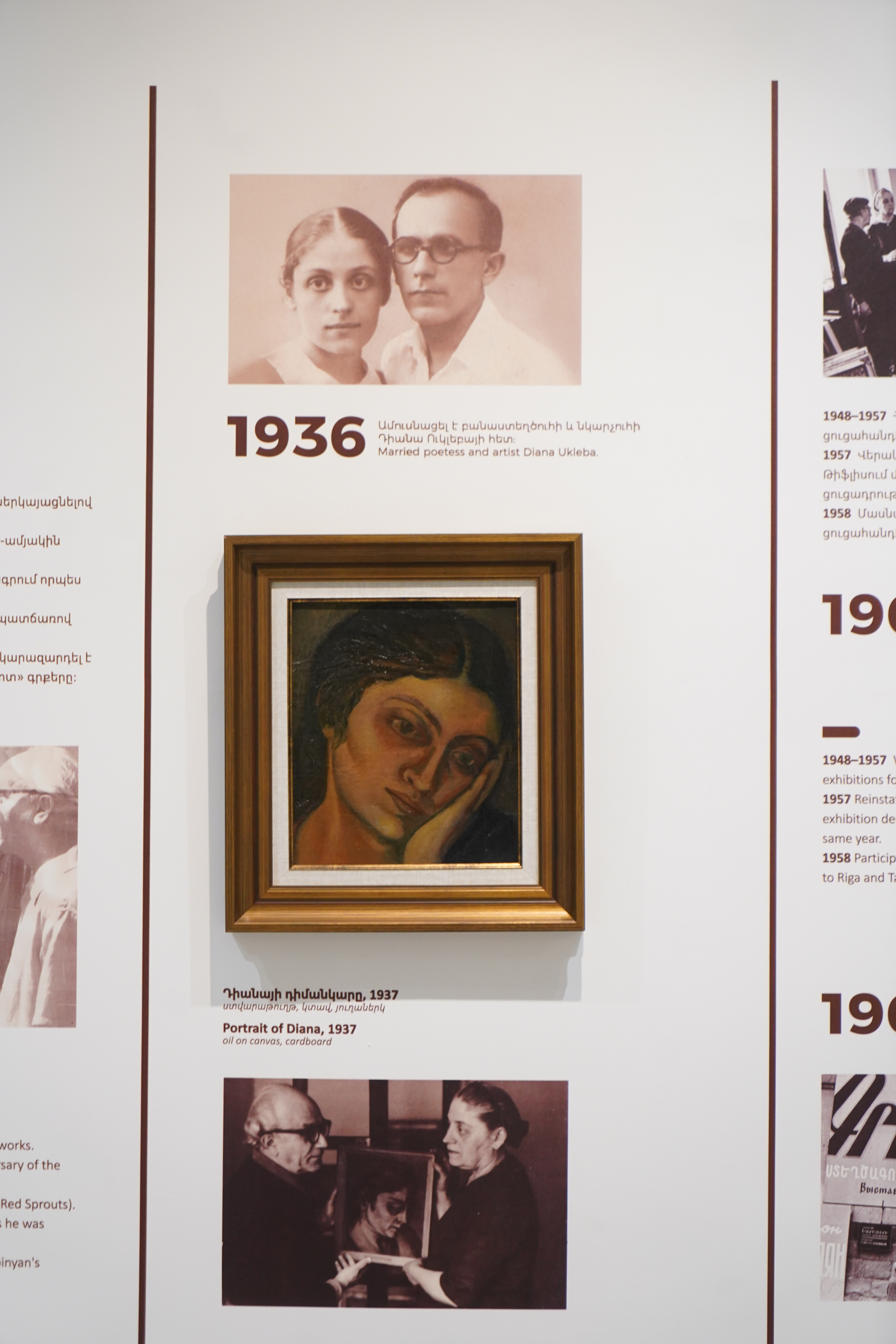

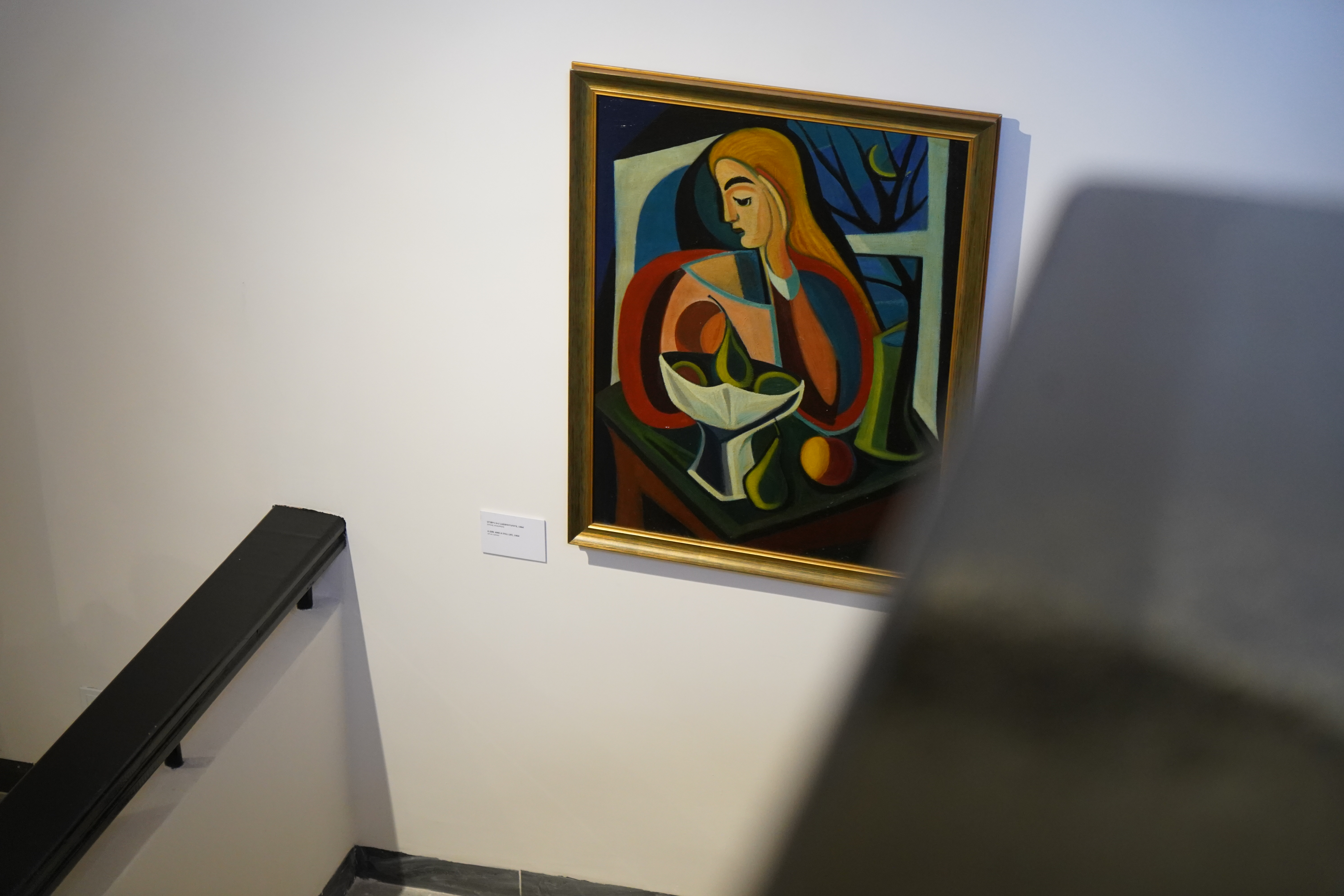

== Family ==
- He was married to Diana Ukleba, Georgian artist and poetess.

== Books ==
- Աշոտ Գրիգորյան, Գևորգ Գրիգորյանը (Ջոտտո)՝ հայտնի և անհայտ, Մոսկվա, 2026 (in Armenian)

== Links ==
- Gevorg Grigoryan (Jotto) Museum
- Grigoryan's paintings
- On November 24, the exhibition titled "Gevorg Grigoryan Giotto" opened at the Cafesjian Center for the Arts.
- At the Origins of the "Tifliz School" of Painting: The Art of Giotto
- The Riddle of "Giotto"
- Biography (in Armenian)
