= Jabulani =

Jabulani is a Zulu word meaning "rejoice".

Jabulani may refer to:

== People ==
- Jabulani Dubazana (born 1954), South African singer with Ladysmith Black Mambazo
- Jabulani Dube, Zimbabwean politician
- Jabulani Maluleke (born 1982), South African footballer
- Jabulani Mnguni (born 1972), South African footballer
- Jabu Moleketi (born 1957), South African politician
- Jabulani Ncobeni (born 1992), South African footballer
- Jabulani Shongwe (born 1990), South African footballer
- Jabulani Sibanda, Zimbabwean war veteran leader
- Jabulani Newby (born 1991), Jamaican-Canadian basketball player
- Jabulani Czavung (born 1992), Zimbabwean -Jbulo Wailer of JBC1xtra also Jabu Beats Studios In Norton...

== Other uses ==
- Adidas Jabulani, the match ball used in the 2010 FIFA World Cup, held in South Africa
- Jabulani, a suburb of Soweto, South Africa
- "Jabulani", a song by PJ Powers
- Jabulani (album), a 2012 studio album by Hugh Masekela

== See also ==
- Jabulile, the feminine version of the given name
