= 2011 African U-20 Championship =

2011 African Youth Championship
2011 Afrikaanse Jeug Championship CAF U20/South Africa

Tournament details
- Host country: South Africa
- City: Johannesburg
- Dates: 17 April – 1 May
- Teams: 8 (from 1 confederation)
- Venues: 2 (in 1 host city)

Final positions
- Champions: Nigeria (6th title)
- Runners-up: Cameroon
- Third place: Egypt
- Fourth place: Mali

Tournament statistics
- Matches played: 16
- Goals scored: 34 (2.13 per match)
- Top scorer: (Nigeria) Uche Nwofor (4 goals)

The 2011 African Youth Championship was a football tournament for the Under-20 level national teams in Africa. It was due to be held in Libya from 18 March to 1 April. Following political unrest in the region, CAF decided to postpone the tournament, before deciding that South Africa would be the new hosts, with games taking place between 17 April and 2 May.

As the Championship also acted as a qualifier for the 2011 FIFA U-20 World Cup, the tournament would have to be played before the end of June 2011.

The tournament was won by Nigeria, who beat Cameroon in the final, to win their sixth title.

== Qualification ==
Qualified teams:

- South Africa (hosts, replaces Libya)
- Cameroon
- Egypt
- Gambia
- Ghana
- Lesotho
- Mali
- Nigeria

== Venues ==
Johannesburg has been named as venue of Orange African Youth Championship 2011. Matches was played at two stadiums in Johannesburg. Dobsonville Stadium, home of Moroka Swallows and Bidvest Stadium, home of Wits University. Rand Stadium, was originally selected as a host stadium, but was dropped in favour of Bidvest Stadium.

(South Africa) Johannesburg
| Dobsonville Stadium | Bidvest Stadium |
| 26.226798°S 27.864071°E | 26.187778°S 28.028333°E |
| Capacity: 24,000 | Capacity: 5,000 |
2011 African U-20 Championship is located in South Africa

== Officials ==
The following referees were chosen for the tournament.

Referees

- Daniel Volgraaff (South Africa)
- Adam Cordier (Chad)
- Badara Diatta (Senegal)
- Crespin Aguidissou (Benin)
- Eldin Abdel Gadir Badr (Sudan)
- Hamdi Chaaban (Egypt)
- Mohamed Benouza (Algeria)
- Mario Bangoura Aboubacar (Guinea)

Assistant referees

- Thusi Siwela Zakhele (South Africa)
- Mohamed Benarous (Algeria)
- Sunguifolo Yeo (Ivory Coast)
- Malonga Bouende (Congo)
- John Kanyenye Lonngional (Tanzania)
- Berhe Tesfagiorgis (Eritrea)
- Malick Alidu Salifu (Ghana)
- Fousseyni Traore (Mali)

== Group stage ==
=== Group A ===
| Pos | Team | Pld | W | D | L | GF | GA | GD | Pts | Qualification |
|---|---|---|---|---|---|---|---|---|---|---|
| 1 | Mali | 3 | 2 | 1 | 0 | 6 | 3 | +3 | 7 | Advance to knockout stage |
| 2 | Egypt | 3 | 2 | 0 | 1 | 3 | 1 | +2 | 6 | Advance to knockout stage |
| 3 | South Africa (H) | 3 | 1 | 0 | 2 | 4 | 6 | −2 | 3 | |
| 4 | Lesotho | 3 | 0 | 1 | 2 | 2 | 5 | −3 | 1 | |

Rules for classification: Group tiebreakers
(H) Hosts
17 April 2011
12:00

| South Africa | 2–4 | Mali |
|---|---|---|
| Nguzana 20', 77' | Report | Doumbia 11'; Coulibaly 22', 38'; Diallo 67' |

Dobsonville Stadium, Johannesburg
Referee: Mohamed Benouza (Algeria)

17 April 2011
15:00

| Egypt | 2–0 | Lesotho |
|---|---|---|
| Hegazy 46'; Salah 63' (pen.) | Report |

Dobsonville Stadium, Johannesburg
Referee: Adam Cordier (Chad)

20 April 2011
12:00

| Lesotho | 1–2 | South Africa |
|---|---|---|
| L. Marabe 66' | Report | Koapeng 22'; Nguzana 32' |

Dobsonville Stadium, Johannesburg
Referee: Hama Nampianbraza (Madagascar)

20 April 2011
15:00

| Mali | 1–0 | Egypt |
|---|---|---|
| Konaté 65' | Report |

Dobsonville Stadium, Johannesburg
Referee: Malick Salif (Ghana)

23 April 2011
12:00

| Mali | 1–1 | Lesotho |
|---|---|---|
| Ballo 17' | Report | Mosiuda 82' |

Bidvest Stadium, Johannesburg
Referee: Badara Diatta (Senegal)

23 April 2011
15:00

| South Africa | 0–1 | Egypt |
|---|---|---|
| | Report | Hamdy 45' |

Dobsonville Stadium, Johannesburg
Referee: Mohamed Benouza (Algeria)

=== Group B ===
| Pos | Team | Pld | W | D | L | GF | GA | GD | Pts | Qualification |
|---|---|---|---|---|---|---|---|---|---|---|
| 1 | Cameroon | 3 | 2 | 1 | 0 | 3 | 1 | +2 | 7 | Advance to knockout stage |
| 2 | Nigeria | 3 | 2 | 0 | 1 | 4 | 2 | +2 | 6 | Advance to knockout stage |
| 3 | Ghana | 3 | 0 | 2 | 1 | 3 | 4 | −1 | 2 | |
| 4 | Gambia | 3 | 0 | 1 | 2 | 1 | 4 | −3 | 1 | |

Rules for classification: Group tiebreakers
18 April 2011
12:00

| Ghana | 1–2 | Nigeria |
|---|---|---|
| Boakye 31' | Report | Nwofor 17', 82' |

Dobsonville Stadium, Johannesburg
Referee: Badara Diatta (Senegal)

18 April 2011
15:00

| Cameroon | 1–0 | Gambia |
|---|---|---|
| Sally 41', 51', 67', 78' | Report |

Dobsonville Stadium, Johannesburg
Referee: Mario Bangoura Aboubacar (Guinea)

21 April 2011
12:00

| Nigeria | 0–1 | Cameroon |
|---|---|---|
| | Report | Ohandza 45+1' |

Dobsonville Stadium, Johannesburg
Referee: Mohamed Benouza (Algeria)

21 April 2011
15:00

| Gambia | 1–1 | Ghana |
|---|---|---|
| Jammeh 22' | Report | Boakye 88' |

Dobsonville Stadium, Johannesburg
Referee: Daniel Volgraaff (South Africa)

24 April 2011
12:00

| Ghana | 1–1 | Cameroon |
|---|---|---|
| Chana 20' | Report | Mbongo 90' |

Dobsonville Stadium, Johannesburg
Referee: Hama Nampianbraza (Madagascar)

24 April 2011
12:00

| Nigeria | 2–0 | Gambia |
|---|---|---|
| Kayode 65'; Olamilekan 77' | Report |

Bidvest Stadium, Johannesburg
Referee: Adam Cordier (Chad)

== Knockout stage ==
The teams that reached this phase qualified for the 2011 FIFA U-20 World Cup.

Semi-finals
28 April
Mali | 0
Nigeria | 2
28 April
Egypt | 0 (2)
Cameroon | 0 (4)

Final
1 May
Nigeria | 3
Cameroon | 2
Third place
1 May
Mali | 0
Egypt | 1

=== Semifinals ===
28 April 2011
12:00

| Mali | 0–2 | Nigeria |
|---|---|---|
| | Report | Nwofor 22'; Okoro 90+2' (pen.) |

Dobsonville Stadium, Johannesburg
Referee: Mario Bangoura Aboubacar (Guinea)

28 April 2011
15:00

| Egypt | 0–0 (a.e.t.) | Cameroon |
|---|---|---|
| | Report |
Penalties
| Hegazy (penalty missed); Hamdy (penalty missed); Ibrahim (penalty scored); Ashraf (penalty scored) | 2–4 | Songo’o (penalty scored); Nyatchou Ndema (penalty scored); Mvom-Mbeyo'o (penalty scored); Banana (penalty scored) |

Dobsonville Stadium, Johannesburg
Referee: Adam Cordier (Chad)

=== Third place playoff ===
1 May 2011
12:00

| Mali | 0–1 | Egypt |
|---|---|---|
| | Report | Hamdy 48' |

Dobsonville Stadium, Johannesburg
Referee: Hama Nampianbraza (Madagascar)

=== Final ===
1 May 2011
15:00

| Nigeria | 3–2 | Cameroon |
|---|---|---|
| Kayode 75'; Nwofor 80'; Envoh 90+2' | Report | Ohandza 82'; Salli 85' |

Dobsonville Stadium, Johannesburg
Referee: Badara Diatta (Senegal)

== Winners ==
2011 African Youth Championship

Nigeria
Sixth title

== Player Awards ==
- Top goalscorer: (Nigeria) Uche Nwofor
- Fair player of the tournament: (Egypt) Ahmed El Shenawy
- Player of the tournament: (Cameroon) Edgar Salli

== Goal scorers ==
4 goals

- (Nigeria) Uche Nwofor

3 goals

- (South Africa) Lucky Nguzana

2 goals

- (Cameroon) Frank Ohandza
- (Cameroon) Edgar Salli
- (Egypt) Mohamed Hamdy
- (Ghana) Richmond Boakye
- (Mali) Kalifa Coulibaly
- (Nigeria) Olarenwaju Kayode

1 goal

- (Cameroon) Emmanuel Mbongo
- (Egypt) Ahmed Hegazy
- (Egypt) Mohamed Salah
- (The Gambia) Baboucarr Jammeh
- (Ghana) Kwame Chana
- (Lesotho) Litsepe Leonty Marabe
- (Mali) Amara Konaté
- (Mali) Cheick Mohamed Chérif Doumbia
- (Mali) Ibrahim Diallo
- (Nigeria) Terry Envoh
- (Nigeria) Azeez Ramon Olamilekan
- (Nigeria) Stanley Okoro
- (South Africa) Letsie Koapeng
