= Miss Eswatini =

Beauty pageant

Miss Eswatini Organization
- Formation: 1975; 51 years ago
- Type: Beauty pageant
- Headquarters: Manzini
- Location: Eswatini
- Members: Miss Universe
- Official language: Swazi
- National Director: Musawenkosi Mantinto
- Website: misseswatini.com

The Miss Eswatini is a national beauty pageant in Eswatini. The pageant was named Miss Swaziland beauty pageant and rebranded to be Miss Eswatini Organization in 2018. The pageant winner aims to be an ambassador of her country. Eswatini last competed at Miss Universe 1994 when Nicola Smith, Miss Swaziland 1994 competed for the crown. This year winner is Tania Nunn who crowned on November 28, 2022.

== History ==
Miss Eswatini pageant was held for first time in 1975. The pageant was run by Eswatini Beauty Pageant Association (ESBPA) in Swaziland. The winner of Miss Eswatini has competed at Miss World pageant ever since the inception of the pageant in 1975 with Vinah Mamba as the country's first international representative. Miss Eswatini will be taking pride in its ability to produce and nurture independent and motivated young ladies who will play an important role in our society through their different skills and abilities through this year's Miss Eswatini pageant. Since 2010 Eswatini does not compete at the Miss World, the last candidate is Nompilo Mncina (as Miss Swaziland 2009). In 2017 the Miss Eswatini held for the first time after 3 years left. Eswatini National Arts and Culture (ESNCAC) partnered to the Miss Eswatini committee. Nowadays the winner will take act as goodwill ambassador in the Kingdom of Eswatini and will go to Miss Africa beauty pageant. It's unsure that the kingdom will automatically return at Miss Universe or even Miss World competition.

The new foundation after renaming the country's name, The Miss Eswatini mission is to empower and provide opportunities for young, diverse, goal orientied women who have the desire and passion for public service and charity while progressively moving forward in their personal and professional life during their year of service and beyond.

In 2022 the committee planned to get the license of Miss Universe. The winner of Miss Eswatini expected to represent the kingdom at the next edition of Miss Universe.

== Ownership ==
- Swaziland Beauty Pageant Association (SBPA) (1975–2018)
- Miss Eswatini Organization, Musawenkosi Mantinto directorship (2022–present)

== Titleholders ==
=== 1975—Present ===
Miss Universe Swaziland/Eswatini

Year	Miss Eswatini
Year	Miss Swaziland 1975–2017
1975	Vinah Thembi Mamba
1978	Nyamalele Ndlovu
1979	Gladys Adelaide Carmichael
1980	Nomagoisa Cawe
1983	Gladys Rudd
1984	Busie Motsa
1985	June Hank
1986	Ilana Faye Lapidos
1987	Phindile Simelane
1988	Thandeka Magagula
1991	Jackie Emelda Bennett
1992	Candy Litchfield
1993	Danila Faias
1994	Nicola Smith
1995	Mandy Saulus
1996	Olive Healy
1997	Xoliswa Mkhonta
1998	Cindy Stanckoczi
1999	Colleen Tullonen
2000	Glenda Mabuza
2002	Nozipho Shabangu
2003	Thembelihle Zwane
2005	Zinhle Marcia Magongo
2007	Nkosingiphile Dlamini
2008	Tiffany Simelane
2009	Nompilo Mncina
2011	Ayanda Dube
2013	Samukelesiwe Magagula
2017	Linda Hutchinson
Year	Miss Eswatini 2018—Present
2018	Nosipho Dlamini
2022	Tania Nunn

== Representatives to international beauty pageants ==
=== Miss Universe Eswatini ===
- : Declared as Winner
- : Ended as runner-up or top 5/6 qualification
- : Ended as one of the finalists or semifinalists
- : Ended as special awards winner

Year	Region	Miss Eswatini	Placement at Miss Universe	Special Award(s)	Notes
Did not compete since 1995—Present
1994	Hhohho	Nicola Smith	Unplaced		The last Miss Swaziland competed at Miss Universe as "Swaziland".
1993	Hhohho	Danila Faias	Unplaced		Swaziland Beauty Pageant Association (SBPA) directorship.
