= Karim Alhassan =

Ghanaian footballer (born 1991)

Karimu Alhassan
Personal information
- Full name: Karimu Alhassan
- Date of birth: 30 April 1991 (age 35)
- Place of birth: Accra, Ghana
- Height: 1.75 m (5 ft 9 in)
- Position: Defender

Youth career
- 2006–2007: Nikwab Professionals
- 2008: Soccer Learners

Senior career*
Years	Team	Apps	(Gls)
2009–2011	Hearts of Oak		
2011–2012	Zamalek	0	(0)
2012–2013	Adana Demirspor	8	(0)
2013	Black Leopards		
2014	Radnički Kragujevac	0	(0)
2015–2016	Liberty Professionals		
2016–	→ Al-Merrikh SC (loan)		
2016–2017	Dire Dawa City		

International career^{‡}
- Ghana U20
2009	Ghana	1	(0)
- * Club domestic league appearances and goals as of 29 January 2014 ‡ National team caps and goals as of 29 January 2014

Karimu Alhassan (born 30 April 1991) is a Ghanaian footballer playing as a defender who last played for Dire Dawa City.

== Career ==
In 2008, he signed for Hearts of Oak, and later was named as the team captain.

On 6 August 2011, he joined Egyptian side Zamalek on a free transfer. However FIFA (CAS after appeal) ordered Hearts of Oak eligible to receive training compensation from Zamalek for US$30,000.

On 25 August 2012, Alhassan joined Turkish TFF First League side Adana Demirspor on a two-year contract after being released by Egyptian club Zamalek. In summer 2013 he joined South African side Black Leopards F.C.

On January 29, 2014, Alhassan signed a two-and-a-half-year contract with Serbian SuperLiga side FK Radnički 1923. He left Radnički and joined Ghana Premier League side Liberty Professionals F.C. in February 2015.

On November 30, 2015, Liberty Professionals F.C. agreed to loan Karimu Alhassan in a one-year deal to Sudan Premier League side Al-Merrikh SC.

== International career ==
Alhassan was called up for the Ghana national team for a friendly game against Argentina and made his debut in the game on 1 October 2009.

He was part of Ghana U-20 squad at the 2011 African Youth Championship.

== Honours ==
Hearts of Oak

- Ghana Premier League: 2008–09
