= Jabulile =

Jabulile (Jabulani male) is a feminine given name, derived from the Nguni word jabula, meaning "rejoice." Notable people with the name include:

- Jabulile Baloyi, South African soccer coach
- Jabulile Mkhwanazi (born 1975), South African politician
- Jabulile Nyawose (1948–1982), South African anti-apartheid activist and trade unionist
