= Tiffany Simelane =

Swazi model (1988–2009)

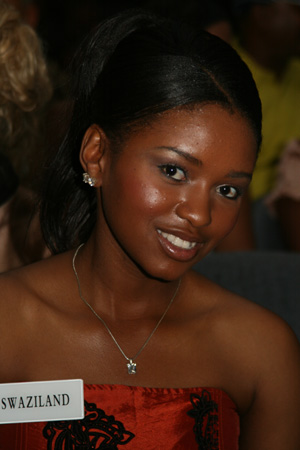
- Born: 1988; Mhlambanyatsi, Swaziland
- Died: August 17, 2009 (aged 21); Mbabane, Eswatini
- Beauty pageant titleholder
- Title: Miss Swaziland 2008

Tiffany Simelane (1988 – August 17, 2009) was a Swazi model and beauty pageant titleholder who represented Swaziland at Miss World 2008 in South Africa. Her reign began on July 26, 2008, and ended August 17, 2009 when she died by suicide.

== Miss Swaziland ==
After being crowned Miss Swaziland, she complained to her friend that as soon as she won she was told she would have to pay all her expenses herself, including the cost of her dress, to travel to the Miss World pageant. This was a great sticking point between her and the contest sponsors and organizers. The organizers reported their own disappointments with Simelane, disclosing that she would "disappear without a trace", causing more controversy. In an interview with the Times of Swaziland she thanked God that her reign was over, stating she thought she was "going crazy" and that the title had been nothing more than a liability to her. When she relinquished her crown at a ceremony in the Royal Swazi Convention Centre, she gave a cryptic speech, revealing that becoming Miss Swaziland had opened her eyes and that she had hoped to remove the cloud of controversy around the competition during her reign. She then claimed that the competition was not being run in the correct fashion, but that her conscience was clear.

== Death ==
On August 17, 2009, Simelane died by suicide by ingesting weevil tablet, a pesticide that contains aluminium phosphide and emits phosphine gas. She was rushed for treatment at the Mbabane Government Hospital. Friends reported that she killed herself over a "broken heart", facing depression and a lack of closeness with her family on top of the stress of being Miss Swaziland.
