= Keagan Buchanan =

South African soccer player

Personal information
- Full name: Keagan Wilbur Buchanan
- Date of birth: 3 April 1991 (age 35)
- Position: Midfielder

Senior career*
Years	Team	Apps	(Gls)
2012–2013	Cape Town	20	(1)
2013–2016	Bloemfontein Celtic	43	(1)
2016–2018	Kaizer Chiefs	9	(0)
2018–	Maritzburg United	39	(1)
2021–2023	AmaZulu	43	(1)
2023–2024	Cape Town Spurs	27	(3)
- * Club domestic league appearances and goals

Keagan Wilbur Buchanan (born 3 April 1991) is a South African soccer player who played as a midfielder. He announced his retirement in October 2025.
