= Dame Diop =

Senegalese footballer (born 1993)

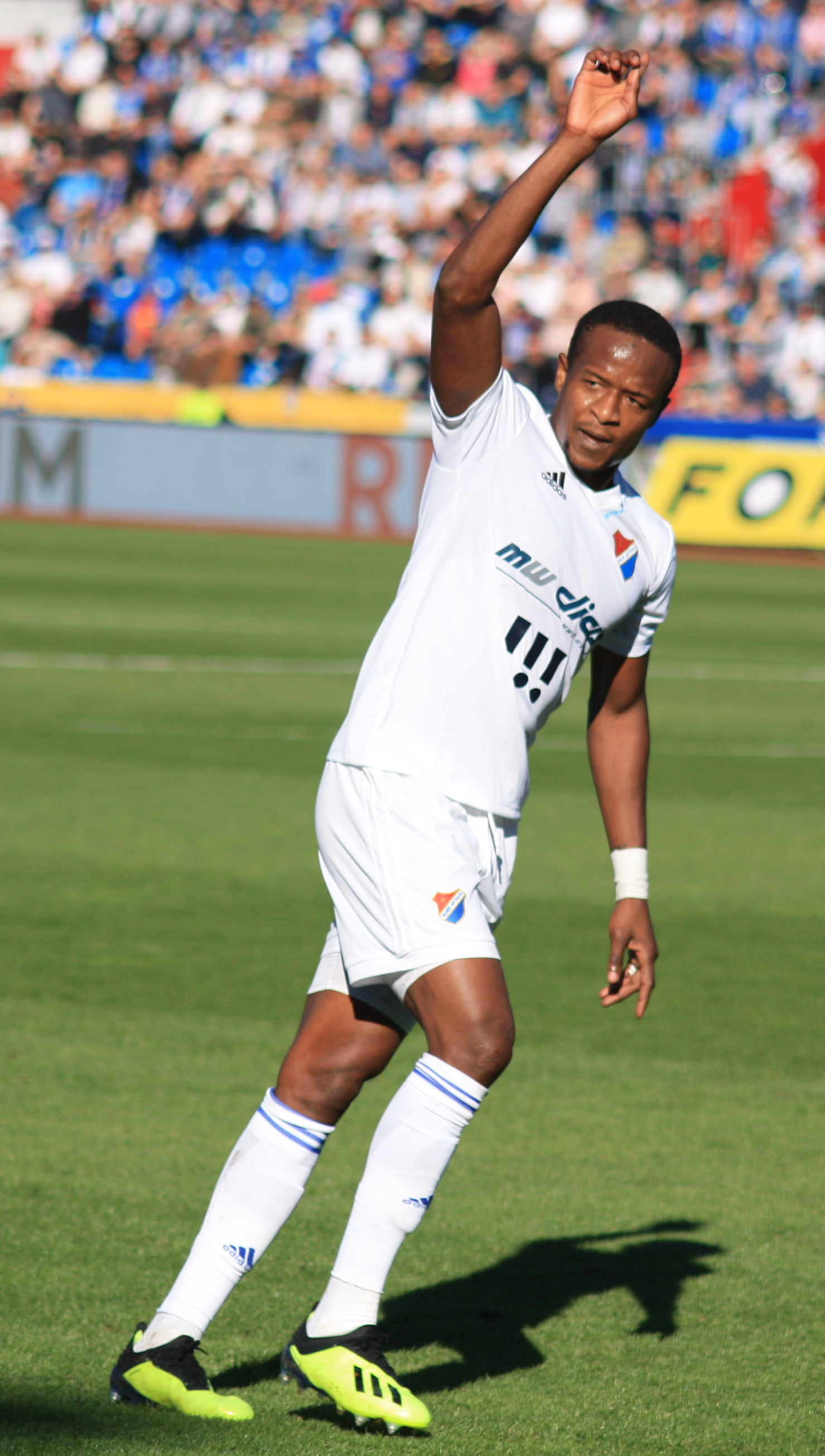
- Diop plays for Baník Ostrava in 2019

Personal information
- Date of birth: 15 February 1993 (age 33)
- Place of birth: Louga, Senegal
- Height: 1.83 m (6 ft 0 in)
- Position: Forward

Youth career
- 2007–2008: Touré Kunda

Senior career*
Years	Team	Apps	(Gls)
2008–2012	Touré Kunda	9	(0)
2012–2013	Khimki	0	(0)
2012	→ Shirak (loan)	7	(0)
2013–2014	Shirak	37	(13)
2014–2015	Slavia Prague	6	(1)
2016–2018	Fastav Zlín	39	(8)
2018–2019	Baník Ostrava	62	(15)
2020–2021	Hatayspor	4	(1)
2021	Dynamo České Budějovice	12	(0)
2022-2023	Pyunik	13	(1)

International career^{‡}
2014–	Senegal	1	(0)
- * Club domestic league appearances and goals as of 18 January 2023 (UTC) ‡ National team caps and goals as of 16:32, 5 August 2019 (UTC)

Dame Diop (born 15 February 1993) is a Senegalese professional footballer who plays as a forward.

== Club career ==
Dame Diop started his career at Touré Kunda. He signed with the Russian club FC Khimki, but failed to make a league appearance before going on loan to FC Shirak from Armenia. He joined FC Shirak permanently in 2013.

On 1 August 2014, he signed a two-year contract with Czech Republic's SK Slavia Prague.

On 10 February 2016, Diop signed a two-year contract with FC Fastav Zlín.

On 22 December 2017, he signed a long-term contract with FC Baník Ostrava.

On 7 September 2022, Diop signed for Armenian Premier League club Pyunik. On 17 January 2023, Pyunik announced that Diop had left the club.

== International career ==
Dame Diop played made his international debut on 1 June 2014 in a friendly match against Colombia.

== Career statistics ==
=== Club ===
As of match played 20 February 2017

Appearances and goals by club, season and competition
Club	Season	League			National cup		Continental		Other		Total	
Club	Season	Division	Apps	Goals	Apps	Goals	Apps	Goals	Apps	Goals	Apps	Goals
Khimki	2011–12	Russian National League	0	0	0	0	–		–		0	0
Khimki	2012–13	Russian National League	0	0	0	0	–		–		0	0
Khimki	Total		0	0	0	0	0	0	0	0	0	0
Shirak (loan)	2012–13	Armenian Premier League	7	0	2	2	0	0	–		9	2
Shirak	2012–13	Armenian Premier League	12	4	5	2	4	1	–		21	7
Shirak	2013–14	Armenian Premier League	25	9	2	1	4	0	1	0	32	10
Shirak	2014–15	Armenian Premier League	0	0	0	0	2	0	–		2	0
Shirak	Total		37	13	7	3	10	1	1	0	55	17
Slavia Prague	2014–15	Czech First League	5	1	1	0	–		–		6	1
Slavia Prague	2015–16	Czech First League	1	0	0	0	–		–		1	0
Slavia Prague	Total		6	1	1	0	0	0	0	0	7	1
Fastav Zlín	2015–16	Czech First League	7	1	0	0	–		–		7	1
Fastav Zlín	2016–17	Czech First League	13	5	2	1	–		–		15	6
Fastav Zlín	Total		20	6	2	1	0	0	0	0	22	7
Career total			70	20	12	6	10	1	1	0	93	27

=== International ===
As of match played 5 August 2019

Senegal national team
Year	Apps	Goals
2014	1	0
Total	1	0
