= Aragoney =

Brazilian footballer (born 1987)

Personal information
- Full name: Aragoney da Silva Santos
- Date of birth: March 7, 1987 (age 39)
- Place of birth: João Pessoa, Brazil
- Height: 1.79 m (5 ft 10 1/2 in)
- Position: Midfielder

Senior career*
Years	Team	Apps	(Gls)
2005	Corinthians Alagoano		
2005	Kawasaki Frontale		
2006	Avaí		
2007	Iraty		
2008	São José		
2008	Gama		
2009	São José		
2009	CRB		
2009–2011	Portimonense	12	(1)
2011–2012	Ulisses	18	(2)
2013	ASA		
2013	Guarany		
- * Club domestic league appearances and goals

Aragoney da Silva Santos (born March 8, 1987) is a former Brazilian football player.

== Career ==
Aragoney played for some Brazilian club and Kawasaki Frontale (Japan), Portimonense (Portugal) and Ulisses (Armenia) from 2005 to 2013.
