= Doctor Mampuru =

South African soccer player

Personal information
- Full name: Sikhumbuzo Doctor Mampuru
- Date of birth: 28 August 1992 (age 34)
- Place of birth: Jane Furse, South Africa
- Position: Right-back

Senior career*
Years	Team	Apps	(Gls)
2011–2013	Mamelodi Sundowns	10	(0)
2013–2014	Chippa United	30	(0)
2014–2015	Mpumalanga Black Aces	13	(0)
- * Club domestic league appearances and goals

Doctor Mampuru (born 28 August 1992) is a South African association football right-back who among others played for the Premier Soccer League club Mamelodi Sundowns.
