= Samuel Kyere (footballer, born 1992) =

Ghanaian footballer

Personal information
- Full name: Samuel Kyere
- Date of birth: 6 August 1992 (age 34)
- Place of birth: Ghana
- Height: 1.74 m (5 ft 9 in)
- Position: Defender

Senior career*
Years	Team	Apps	(Gls)
2009–2013	Berekum Chelsea		
2013	Shirak	8	(0)
2013–2017	Asante Kotoko		

International career
2012	Ghana U-20	2	(0)
- * Club domestic league appearances and goals as of 5 July 2020

Samuel Kyere (born 6 August 1992) is a Ghanaian football (defender) player whose last known club was Asante Kotoko.

== Career statistics ==
=== Club ===
As of match played 15 July 2015

Appearances and goals by club, season and competition
Club	Season	League			National Cup		Continental		Other		Total	
Club	Season	Division	Apps	Goals	Apps	Goals	Apps	Goals	Apps	Goals	Apps	Goals
Shirak	2012–13	Armenian Premier League	7	0	5	0	0	0	-		12	0
Shirak	2013–14	Armenian Premier League	1	0	0	0	4	0	0	0	5	0
Shirak	Total		8	0	5	0	4	0	0	0	17	0
Career total			8	0	5	0	4	0	0	0	17	0
