= Alagie Nyabally =

Gambian footballer

Personal information
- Date of birth: 15 November 1991 (age 34)
- Place of birth: Sukuta, Gambia
- Height: 1.87 m (6 ft 1 1/2 in)
- Position: Goalkeeper

Team information
- Current team: Gambia Ports Authority

Senior career*
Years	Team	Apps	(Gls)
2012	Bakau United		
2013–2015	Real de Banjul		
2015	Tusker		
2015–2017	Real de Banjul		
2017–	Gambia Ports Authority		

International career^{‡}
2015–2017	Gambia	7	(0)
- * Club domestic league appearances and goals as of 20:16, 4 September 2020 (UTC) ‡ National team caps and goals as of 20:16, 4 September 2020 (UTC)

Alagie Nyabally (born 15 November 1991) is a Gambian international footballer who plays for Gambia Ports Authority as a goalkeeper.

== Career ==
Born in Sukuta, he has played club football for Bakau United, Real de Banjul, Tusker and Gambia Ports Authority.

He made his international debut for Gambia in 2015.
