= Ahmed Younis (journalist) =

Iraqi journalist and writer (born 1994)

Ahmed Younis Basheer
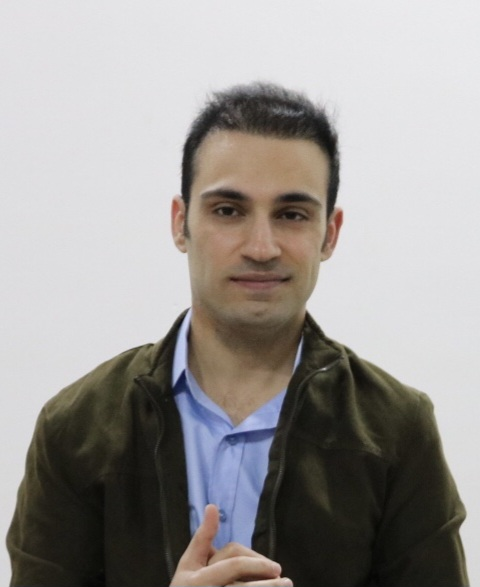
- Born: January 20, 1994 (age 32)
- Occupation: Journalist
- Language: Arabic
- Years active: 2017–present

Ahmed Younis Basheer (Arabic: أحمد يونس بشير; born 20 January 1994) is an Iraqi writer and journalist. He was born in the town of Zummar in the Nineveh Governorate, northern Iraq. He has worked in various fields including journalism, sports analysis and television production.

== Early life and education ==
Ahmed Younis pursued higher education at the University of Duhok, where he studied in the College of Arts – Department of Media.

== Career ==
Since 2019, Younis has worked in the media department of Duhok sc. In addition to his role at the club, he has written for several Iraqi and regional newspapers and media outlets, including Elaph Newspaper and Al-Daei News Foundation. the new arab. arabi21. In 2017, Younis began working as a sports analyst and commentator. He often covers football and local sports events.

== Artistic and television work ==
Younis has also been involved in the artistic and television field, working as a consultant in cinematography and directing. His contributions include advisory roles in media production. Notably, he took part in the Egyptian television series Awdat Al-Ab Al-Dal (Return of the Lost Father), which gained popularity upon its release.
