= Ayanda Dube =

Swazi model and beauty pageant titleholder

- Born: Ayanda Dube; November 13, 1989 (age 36); Ezulwini, Swaziland
- Height: 1.75 m (5 ft 9 in)
- Beauty pageant titleholder
- Title: Miss Swaziland 2011/2012
- Hair color: Black
- Eye color: brown
- Major competitions: Miss Swaziland 2011 (Winner); Miss Universe 2012

Ayanda Dube; (born November 13, 1989) is a Swazi model and beauty pageant titleholder who was crowned Miss Swaziland 2011 and represented her country in the 2012 Miss Universe pageants.

== Early life ==
Ayanda attended the University of Eswatini (UNISWA) Luyengo campus.

== Miss Swaziland 2011/2012 ==
Ayanda Dube was crowned Miss Swaziland 2011 on Friday night 21 October 2011 at the Woodlands Hall at Ezulwini, during a contest that saw 13 beauty contestants competing for the title.

Awards and achievements
Preceded by Nompilo Mncina	Miss Swaziland; 2012	Succeeded by Incumbent
