= Levon Pachajyan =

Armenian footballer

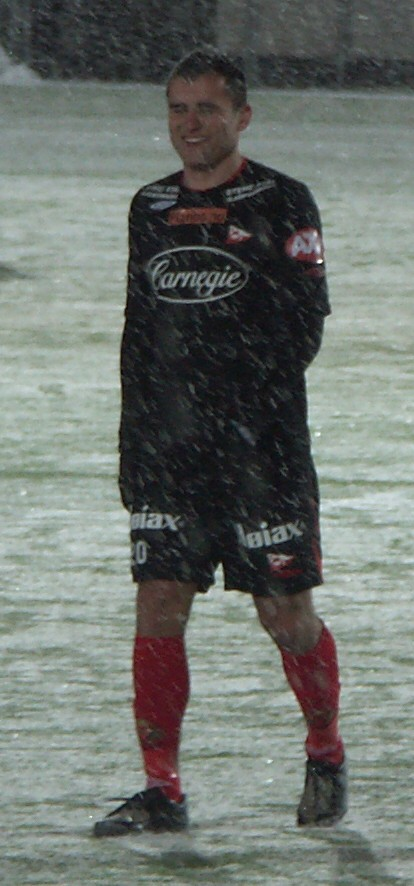

Personal information
- Full name: Levon Pachajyan
- Date of birth: 20 September 1983 (age 43)
- Place of birth: Yerevan, Soviet Union
- Height: 1.71 m (5 ft 7 1/2 in)
- Position: Midfielder

Team information
- Current team: Linköping City
- Number: 19

Youth career
- 2001–2002: Kotayk Abovian
- 2002–2003: Zvartnots Yerevan

Senior career*
Years	Team	Apps	(Gls)
2003–2007	Pyunik Yerevan	100	(37)
2008–2009	GAIS	27	(2)
2009	→ Fredrikstad FK (loan)	5	(0)
2009–2012	Sanat Naft	55	(10)
2012–2013	Shirak Gyumri	23	(3)
2013	FC Mika	1	(0)
2013–2014	Assyriska FF	22	(0)
2015	Arameiska-Syrianska	19	(2)
2016	Södertälje FK	22	(5)
2017–2021	Linköping City	54	(15)

International career
2003–2005	Armenia U-21	12	(1)
2004–2011	Armenia	37	(2)
- * Club domestic league appearances and goals as of 26 November 2018

Levon Pachajyan (Armenian: Լեւոն Պաչաջյան; born 20 September 1983, in Yerevan, Soviet Union) is an Armenian football midfielder. He last played for the Swedish club Linköping City. He is a former member of the Armenia national team. Levon was voted as best Armenian footballer of 2007 season.

== Club career ==
Pachajyan joined Swedish side GAIS in 2008 on a contract that ran until 2013. Norwegian team Fredrikstad FK loaned him for the period of 1 March – 31 July 2009. He debuted for Fredrikstad in a friendly match against IFK Göteborg on 19 February 2009. He made his debut in the Norwegian Tippeliga against Bodø/Glimt. The loan with Fredrikstad expired during the summer of 2009, and in September GAIS terminated his contract.

== Club career Stats ==
Club performance			League		Cup		Total	
Season	Club	League	Apps	Goals	Apps	Goals	Apps	Goals
Iran			League		Hazfi Cup		Total	
2009–10	Sanat Naft	Azadegan League	10	3	3	2	13	5
2010–11	Sanat Naft	Persian Gulf Cup	20	3	0	0	20	3
2011–12	Sanat Naft	Persian Gulf Cup	25	4	1	0	26	4
Total			55	10	4	2	59	12

- Assist Goals

Season	Team	Assists
10-11	Sanat Naft	8
11-12	Sanat Naft	4

== International career ==
Pachajyan made his debut in an away friendly match against Hungary on 18 February 2004. He scored his first goal for Armenia on 28 May 2008 against Moldova in a friendly match and also assisted in another goal.

== National team statistics ==
Armenia national team
Year	Apps	Goals
2004	4	0
2005	1	0
2006	3	0
2007	10	0
2008	10	1
2009	2	0
2010	6	1
2011	1	0
Total	37	2

== International goals ==
#	Date	Venue	Opponent	Score	Result	Competition
1	28 May 2008	Tiraspol, Moldova	Moldova	2-2	Draw	Friendly
2	3 March 2010	Antalya, Turkey	Belarus	1-3	Lost	Friendly

== Achievements ==
- Armenian Premier League with Pyunik Yerevan: 2003, 2004, 2005, 2006, 2007
- Armenian Cup with Pyunik Yerevan: 2004
- Armenian Supercup with Pyunik Yerevan: 2003, 2004, 2006
