= Edgar Salli =

Cameroonian footballer

Personal information
- Full name: Edgar Nicaise Constant Salli
- Date of birth: 17 August 1992 (age 34)
- Place of birth: Garoua, Cameroon
- Height: 1.71 m (5 ft 7 in)
- Position: Winger

Senior career*
Years	Team	Apps	(Gls)
2008–2009	Ngaoundéré FC		
2009–2011	Coton Sport		
2011–2016	Monaco	32	(5)
2013–2014	→ Lens (loan)	27	(5)
2014–2015	→ Académica (loan)	9	(0)
2015–2016	→ St. Gallen (loan)	26	(8)
2016–2019	Nürnberg	44	(3)
2019–2020	Sepsi OSK	12	(0)
2020–2023	Olympiakos Nicosia	55	(10)

International career^{‡}
2009–2011	Cameroon U20		
2011–2019	Cameroon	39	(4)
Medal record
Men's football
Representing Cameroon
Africa Cup of Nations
Winner	2017 Gabon
- * Club domestic league appearances and goals as of 01:43, 22 May 2022 (UTC) ‡ National team caps and goals as of 15:31, 10 October 2020 (UTC)

Edgar Nicaise Constant Salli (born 17 August 1992), commonly known as Edgar Salli, is a Cameroonian former footballer who played as a winger. He has previously played for Monaco and Coton Sport.

== Club career ==
=== Early career in Cameroon ===
Salli began his career with central Cameroonian club Ngaoundéré FC and made his senior debut in Elite Two during the 2008–09 season. Ngaoundéré were relegated at the end of the campaign, and Salli joined Elite One side Coton Sport ahead of the 2009–10 season. His first campaign with the club was successful as Coton Sport were crowned champions of Cameroon for the tenth time, and Salli established himself in the Cameroon under-20 team. He continued to feature prominently for the club during the next campaign and his performances at the 2011 African Youth Championship saw him receive several offers from Europe. In May 2011, Salli was linked with a transfer to South African side Moroka Swallows with Kick Off reporting that he had a pre-contract agreement with them, but a transfer never materialised.

=== Monaco and loans ===
Having retained the Elite One championship with Coton Sport, he was transferred to Monaco in July 2011 for an undisclosed fee. He signed a three-year contract with the club, who had been relegated to Ligue 2 at the end of the 2010–11 season. Salli made his debut for Monaco in a 0–0 draw with Boulogne on 1 August, and scored his first goal for the club three weeks later in a one-all draw with Amiens. Salli scored his fifth goal of the season in league and cup competition on 2 March 2012 in a 2–2 draw with Sedan. He finished the season with five goals in 31 appearances. Salli played regularly for the reserves in the Championnat de France amateur the following season and made one appearance for the first team as the club won promotion back to Ligue 1 as champions.

On 23 July 2013, Salli joined RC Lens on a season-long loan from Monaco.

On 22 August 2014, he was once again loaned, this time to Académica.

Salli was again loaned out for the 2015–16 season to St. Gallen in the Swiss Super League.

=== 1. FC Nürnberg ===
On 21 July 2016, it was announced that Salli would be joining forces of the German 2. Bundesliga team 1. FC Nürnberg.

=== Sepsi OSK Sfântu Gheorghe ===
On 29 July 2019, Salli signed two-year contract with Liga I side Sepsi OSK Sfântu Gheorghe.

== International career ==
Prior to receiving his first cap for the Cameroon national team, Salli represented his country at youth international level. He made his debut for the under-20 team in 2009 and played regularly over the next two years. He took part in the 2010 CEMAC Cup and was voted player of the tournament at the 2011 African Youth Championship. Cameroon finished as runners-up in both competitions. Salli made his senior debut for Cameroon in a 1–1 draw with Equatorial Guinea on 11 October 2011. He took part in the 2011 LG Cup in November, an exhibition tournament held in Morocco, which Cameroon won. He scored his first goal for Cameroon against Moldova on 7 June 2014. Salli scored Cameroon's winner in an AFCON qualification win over Mauritania in June 2016.

=== International goals ===
As of match played 6 September 2016. Cameroon score listed first, score column indicates score after each Salli goal.

International goals by date, venue, cap, opponent, score, result and competition
No.	Date	Venue	Cap	Opponent	Score	Result	Competition
1	7 June 2014	Stade Ahmadou Ahidjo, Yaoundé, Cameroon	9	Moldova	1–0	1–0	Friendly
2	13 November 2015	Stade Général Seyni Kountché, Niamey, Niger	24	Niger	3–0	3–0	2018 FIFA World Cup qualification
3	3 June 2016	Stade Olympique, Nouakchott, Mauritania	29	Mauritania	1–0	1–0	2017 Africa Cup of Nations qualification
4	6 September 2016	Limbe Stadium, Limbe, Cameroon	30	Gabon	2–1	2–1	Friendly

== Honours ==
Cameroon

- Africa Cup of Nations: 2017
