= Lucky Baloyi =

South African soccer player

Personal information
- Full name: Lucky Given Baloyi
- Date of birth: 19 June 1991 (age 35)
- Place of birth: Mokopane, South Africa
- Position: Defensive midfielder

Team information
- Current team: Polokwane City
- Number: 35

Youth career
- Manchester United (South Africa)
- Tshiamo Sports Academy
- 2005–2010: Kaizer Chiefs
- Soweto Panthers

Senior career*
Years	Team	Apps	(Gls)
2010–2017	Kaizer Chiefs	72	(5)
2014–2015	→ Moroka Swallows (loan)	35	(1)
2017–2021	Bloemfontein Celtic	119	(3)
2021–2022	Royal AM	1	(0)
2022–2023	Maritzburg United	13	(1)
2023–	Polokwane City	10	(0)

International career
2011	South Africa U20	3	(0)
- * Club domestic league appearances and goals as of 11 January 2024

Lucky "Sheriff" Baloyi (born 19 June 1991) is a South African soccer player who plays as a defensive midfielder for Polokwane City in the Premier Soccer League.

== Club career ==
Baloyi got the nickname 'Sheriff' because nobody could get past him in at the back. He went for a trial at Chiefs from Tshiamo Sports Academy from Polokwane in 2005. There was a mix-up where Chiefs were expecting a defender, midfielder and striker and Tshiamo sent two midfielders and a striker. "When we arrived at Chiefs they asked, 'So who of you guys is a defender?' and the three of us kept quiet … We were so scared, because we thought we were going to be dismissed and I was so desperate to play for Chiefs, so I raised my hand and said, 'I'm the one who is a defender!" Baloyi did well at the trials and played in defence under Patrick Ntsoelengoe until Fani Madida took over to coach the reserves, when he was converted to midfield.
