= Orlando Wellington =

Ghanaian football manager

Personal information
- Place of birth: Ghana

Managerial career
- Years: Team
- Ghana U-20
- Heart of Lions

Orlando Wellington is a Ghanaian football manager. He has previously managed the Ghana Under-20 team as the head coach.

He has also previously managed Heart of Lions in the Ghanaian Premier League.
