= Ahmed Younis (footballer) =

Egyptian footballer (born 1991)

Personal information
- Date of birth: February 10, 1991 (age 35)
- Height: 1.88 m (6 ft 2 in)
- Position: Centre-back

Team information
- Current team: Enppi
- Number: 5

Youth career
- Enppi

Senior career*
Years	Team	Apps	(Gls)
2011–2019	Enppi	116	(38)
- * Club domestic league appearances and goals as of 14 July 2017

Ahmed Younis (Arabic: أحمد يونس; born February 10, 1991) is an Egyptian former professional footballer who played as a centre-back for the Egyptian club Enppi. He was on the official squads for the FIFA U-20 World Cup 2011 and Africa U-23 Cup of Nations in 2011 in South Africa.
