= Sukuta =

Place in Western Division, The Gambia The Smiling cost of west Africa

Sukuta Sabiji
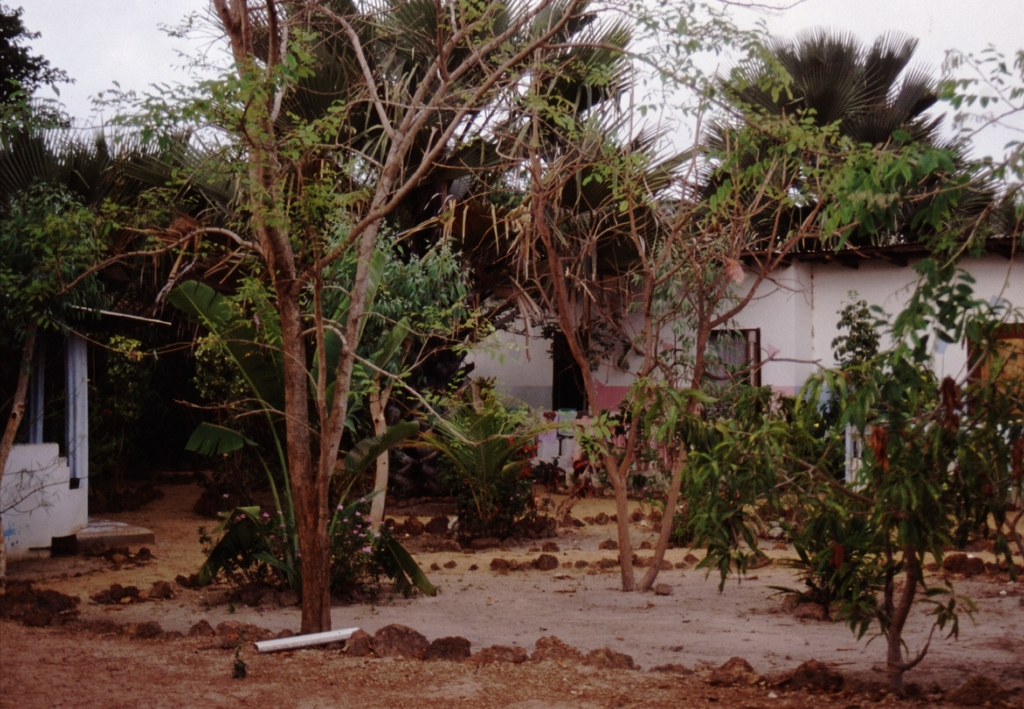
- Nickname: Sabiji
- Location in the Gambia
- Coordinates: 13°25′N 16°42′W
- Country: The Gambia
- Division: Western Division

Government
  - Alkalo: As at 2018 Kawsu Cham

Population (2003)
  - Total: 40,675
- Time zone: UTC±00:00 (GMT)

Sukuta is a town located in the Western Division of the Gambia. It had a population of 16,667 as of the 1993 census.
