= Litsepe Marabe =

Mosotho footballer (born 1992)

Litšepe Leonty Marabe (born 20 February 1992 in Mafeteng) is a Mosotho professional footballer who plays as a midfielder for Lioli FC. In 2022, Marabe moved to India and signed with Kerala Premier League side BASCO SC (Brothers Arts and Sports Club Othukkungal), before joining Transport United FC in Bhutan.
