= Cheick Chérif Doumbia =

Malian footballer

Cheick Doumbia
Personal information
- Full name: Cheikh Mohamed Chérif Doumbia
- Date of birth: 19 August 1991 (age 35)
- Place of birth: Bamako, Mali
- Height: 1.70 m (5 ft 7 in)
- Position: Midfielder

Team information
- Current team: Borgo
- Number: 8

Youth career
- Stade Malien

Senior career*
Years	Team	Apps	(Gls)
2008–2009	Stade Malien		
2010–2011	Stade Tunisien	9	(0)
2011–2014	Stade Malien		
2014–2017	Brest	15	(0)
2014–2017	Brest B	39	(2)
2017	→ CA Bastia (loan)	15	(0)
2017–	Borgo (Note: In 2022, FC Bastia-Borgo was renamed FC Borgo.)	206	(10)

International career
2013–2014	Mali	6	(0)
- * Club domestic league appearances and goals as of 17:29, 21 May 2022 (UTC)

Cheick Mohamed Chérif Doumbia (born 19 August 1991) is a Malian professional footballer who plays as a midfielder for Championnat National 1 club Borgo. He is a former Mali international.

== Club career ==
On 30 June 2014, Doumbia moved from Stade Malien to Ligue 2 side Brest, signing a two-year contract with an option for a further year. He was presented with a Brest jersey with number 21 and name "Cheick M.C." on the back.

On 15 January 2017, Doumbia joined Championnat National side CA Bastia on loan until the end of the season.

At the end of August 2017, Doumbia signed for newly formed Championnat National 2 side Bastia-Borgo.

== International career ==
In January 2014, coach Djibril Dramé invited him to be a part of the Mali squad for the 2014 African Nations Championship. He played all three of Mali's matches at the first round of the tournament and helped the team to the quarter finals where they lost to Zimbabwe by two goals to one.
