= Ayanda Lubelo =

South African soccer player

Personal information
- Date of birth: 28 February 1992 (age 34)
- Place of birth: Durban, South Africa
- Position: Midfielder

Team information
- Current team: Uthongathi
- Number: 24

Youth career
- ASD Cape Town

Senior career*
Years	Team	Apps	(Gls)
2011–2012	Mpumalanga Black Aces		
2012–2013	University of Pretoria	17	(0)
2013–2014	Bidvest Wits	3	(0)
2014–2015	Polokwane City	0	(0)
2019–	Uthongathi	8	(1)
- * Club domestic league appearances and goals as of 30 May 2013 ‡ National team caps and goals as of 30 May 2013

Ayanda Lubelo (born 28 February 1992) is a South African football (soccer) midfielder who plays for Uthongathi in the Premier Soccer League.
