= Armen Tigranyan =

Armenian footballer

Personal information
- Full name: Armen Tigranyan
- Date of birth: 27 November 1985 (age 40)
- Place of birth: Leninakan, Armenian SSR, Soviet Union
- Height: 1.79 m (5 ft 10 in)
- Position: Midfielder

Senior career*
Years	Team	Apps	(Gls)
2002–2004	Shirak	22	(1)
2005–2007	Pyunik	56	(1)
2007	Gandzasar	4	(0)
2008	Zob Ahan	6	(0)
2008	Gomel	11	(0)
2009–2010	Ulisses	30	(1)
2011–2013	Shirak	44	(0)
2014–2015	Ulisses	7	(0)

International career^{‡}
2004–2006	Armenia U21	7	(0)
2005–2006	Armenia	3	(0)
- * Club domestic league appearances and goals as of 11 April 2017 ‡ National team caps and goals as of 21 November 2007

Armen Tigranyan (Armenian: Արմեն Տիգրանյան; born 27 November 1985) is an Armenian former football midfielder. He was also a member of the Armenia national team, and has participated in 3 international matches since his debut in an away 2006 World Cup qualification match against Czech Republic on 7 September 2005.

== Achievements ==
- Armenian Premier League with Pyunik: 2005, 2006
- Armenian Supercup with Pyunik: 2006
