= Jabulani Ncobeni =

South African soccer player (born 1992)

Jabulani Ncubeni
Personal information
- Full name: Jabulani Nkosingiphile Ncubeni
- Date of birth: 18 December 1992 (age 33)
- Place of birth: Pietermaritzburg, South Africa
- Positions: Left winger; central midfielder

Team information
- Current team: Royal AM
- Number: 8

Youth career
- Dubs FC
- Maritzburg City
- Maritzburg United

Senior career*
Years	Team	Apps	(Gls)
2009–2012	Maritzburg United	31	(0)
2014-2017	Thanda Royal Zulu	77	(8)
2015-16	→ Golden Arrows (loan)	2	(0)
2017-2020	AmaZulu	55	(2)
2020-2021	Celtic	7	(0)
2021–	Royal AM	35	(0)
- * Club domestic league appearances and goals as of 15 June 2024

Jabulani Ncubeni (born 18 December 1992) is a South African professional soccer player who plays for Royal AM.
