= Letsie Koapeng =

South African soccer player (born 1992)

Personal information
- Date of birth: 12 January 1992 (age 34)
- Height: 1.75 m (5 ft 9 in)
- Position: Forward

Team information
- Current team: Durban City

Youth career
- Bidvest Wits

Senior career*
| Years | Team | Apps | (Gls) |
| 2010–2013 | Bidvest Wits | 27 | (2) |
| 2011 | → Bay United (loan) | | |
| 2013 | → Bloemfontein Celtic (loan) | 6 | (0) |
| 2014 | → Chippa United (loan) | 6 | (2) |
| 2014–2016 | Orlando Pirates | 1 | (0) |
| 2015 | → Royal Eagles (loan) | | |
| 2016–2017 | Stellenbosch | 12 | (4) |
| 2017 | Cape Town City | 13 | (2) |
| 2018 | Platinum Stars | 11 | (2) |
| 2018–2019 | Cape Umoya United | 16 | (2) |
| 2021 | Jomo Cosmos | 9 | (0) |
| 2021–2023 | Marumo Gallants | 29 | (3) |
| 2023–2014 | Richards Bay | 7 | (1) |
| 2024 | Moroka Swallows | 10 | (0) |
| 2025 | Orbit College | 7 | (2) |
| 2025– | Durban City | 10 | (2) |
- * Club domestic league appearances and goals as of 4 January 2026

Letsie Koapeng (born 12 January 1992) is a South African soccer player who played as a forward for eight different clubs in the South African Premier Division. He currently plays for Durban City.

== Career ==
Koapeng spent his early career in the Bidvest Wits, making his first-tier debut in the 2010–11 South African Premier Division for Santos. For the 2013–14 season, he went on loan to Bloemfontein Celtic, but did not break into the team. He also spent time on loan at Chippa United before being released by Bidvest Wits in the summer of 2014. He subsequently trained with Mpumalanga Black Aces, but ended up joining one of South Africa's biggest clubs, Orlando Pirates.

He mostly played in the Diski Challenge Shield for the Buccaneers, and was also loaned out to the Royal Eagles for a two-month duration. In the summer of 2016, he trained with Cape Town City and Cape Town All Stars before being released by Orlando Pirates in September.

In the 2016–17 season, he first went to Stellenbosch before moving to Cape Town City in the 2017 winter transfer window. The Citizens' manager Eric Tinkler had previously brought Koapeng into the Bidvest Wits academy, and was also behind Koapeng's earlier transfer to Stellenbosch. He joined Platinum Stars in the 2017–18 season, but experienced relegation with that club. He played the next season for Cape Umoya United. Being a free agent in 2019, he trained with Moroka Swallows. In 2021 he went from Jomo Cosmos to Marumo Gallants. He was thus part of Marumo Gallants' run in CAF competitions. Koapeng then began the 2023–24 season with Richards Bay, but in the winter window of 2024 he signed for Moroka Swallows, who completely rebuilt their squad.
