= 2013–14 FC Ararat Yerevan season =

Ararat Yerevan
2013–14 season
- Chairman: Hrach Kaprielian
- Manager: Abraham Khashmanyan
- Stadium: Hrazdan Stadium
- Premier League: 4th
- Armenian Cup: Quarterfinal vs Pyunik
- Top goalscorer: League: Two Players (10); All: Aleksandar Rakić (11)
- Highest home attendance: 1,000 vs Pyunik; 30 April 2014
- Lowest home attendance: 100 vs Banants; 19 April 2014
- Average home league attendance: 350
Home colours	Away colours	Third colours

The 2013–14 season was FC Ararat Yerevan's 23rd consecutive season in the Armenian Premier League. Ararat finished the season in 4th position, missing out on European football by 3points. In the Armenian Cup they were knocked out by Pyunik in the Quarterfinals.

== Season events ==
Prior to the start of the season, Ararat traveled to Serbia for a training camp and three friendly games, with new signing Miloš Stamenković joining the club during the trip. During the training camp, Ararat signed Darko Bondzić and Aleksandar Rakić, and national team goalkeeper Stepan Ghazaryan.

On 2 August 2013, Ararat signed Aram Bareghamyan from Ulisses on a contract until May 2014.

On 9 December 2013, Ararat parted was with Arsen Petrosyan and Hovhannes Grigoryan, whilst Tigran Voskanyan extended his contract with the club until May 2014.

In January 2014, Ararat traveled to Cyprus for a training camp.

In February, Ararat signed Andrejs Perepļotkins from Daugava Riga, Aleksandr Dubõkin from Jõhvi Lokomotiv, Eduard Chudnowski from BATE Borisov and Kenan Čejvanović from Gorica on contracts until the end of the season.

Whilst Alexandru Pașcenco signed a 3.5-year contract with Ararat on 21 February from Sheriff Tiraspol.

== Squad ==
As of match played 18 May 2014

Number	Name	Nationality	Position	Date of birth (age)	Signed from	Signed in	Contract ends	Apps.	Goals
Goalkeepers
1	Manvel Afrikyan	(Armenia)	GK	8 August 1985 (aged 28)	Ulisses	2013		1	0
12	Grigor Meliksetyan	(Armenia)	GK	18 August 1986 (aged 27)	Gahar Zagros	2013		1	0
22	Stepan Ghazaryan	(Armenia)	GK	11 January 1985 (aged 29)	Banants	2013		29	0
	Arman Meliksetyan	(Armenia)	GK	21 July 1995 (aged 18)	Banants	2013		0	0
Defenders
2	Vahe Matirosyan	(Armenia)	DF	19 January 1988 (aged 26)	Ulisses	2009			
3	Miloš Stamenković	(Serbia)	DF	1 June 1990 (aged 23)	BSK Borča	2013		26	1
4	Armen Durunts	(Armenia)	DF	1 November 1990 (aged 23)	Ararat Yerevan II	2013		5	0
5	Norayr Grigoryan	(Armenia)	DF	7 January 1983 (aged 31)	Ulisses	2013		27	2
6	Armen Tahmazyan	(Iran)	DF	5 June 1990 (aged 23)	Esteghlal	2013		5	0
18	Gorik Khachatryan	(Armenia)	DF	16 June 1988 (aged 25)	Impuls	2011			
19	Vаchаgаn Kаrаpetyan	(Armenia)	DF	12 March 1983 (aged 31)	Ulisses	2008			
25	Artak Andrikyan	(Armenia)	DF	24 January 1988 (aged 26)	Ulisses	2014		6	0
86	Kenan Čejvanović	(Bosnia and Herzegovina)	DF	9 August 1986 (aged 27)	Sloboda Tuzla	2014		9	0
Midfielders
8	David Grigoryan	(Armenia)	MF	28 December 1982 (aged 31)	Ulisses	2013		28	2
10	Andrejs Perepļotkins	(Latvia)	MF	27 December 1984 (aged 29)	Daugava Riga	2014		12	2
13	Eduard Chudnowski	(Belarus)	MF	3 January 1991 (aged 23)	BATE Borisov	2014		2	0
14	Aram Bareghamyan	(Armenia)	MF	6 January 1988 (aged 26)	Ulisses	2013		25	1
15	David G. Grigoryan	(Armenia)	MF	17 July 1989 (aged 24)	King Delux	2012			
17	Aleksandr Dubõkin	(Estonia)	MF	6 May 1983 (aged 31)	Jõhvi Lokomotiv	2014		2	0
20	Darko Bondzić	(Serbia)	MF	17 January 1984 (aged 30)	Radnički Nova Pazova	2013		28	0
21	Avetik Kirakosyan	(Armenia)	MF	21 June 1983 (aged 30)	Ulisses	2012			
89	Alexandru Pașcenco	(Moldova)	MF	28 May 1989 (aged 24)	Sheriff Tiraspol	2014		6	0
	Khoren Veranyan	(Armenia)	MF	4 September 1985 (aged 28)	Impuls	2011			
	Tigran Grigoryan	(Armenia)	MF	27 July 1991 (aged 22)	Alashkert	2014			
Forwards
7	Aleksandar Rakić	(Serbia)	FW	7 January 1987 (aged 27)	Cement Beočin	2013		30	11
9	Gevorg Nranyan	(Armenia)	FW	9 March 1986 (aged 28)	Ulisses	2012			
11	Arsen Balabekyan	(Armenia)	FW	24 November 1986 (aged 27)	Ulisses	2013		26	1
36	Mher Sahakyan	(Armenia)	FW	15 July 1995 (aged 18)	Impuls	2013		12	0
Away on loan
Left during the season
	Arsen Petrosyan	(Armenia)	GK	27 September 1991 (aged 22)	Pyunik	2012			
	Hovhannes Grigoryan	(Armenia)	DF	9 March 1985 (aged 29)	Ulisses	2013			
	Galust Petrosyan	(Armenia)	FW	5 September 1981 (aged 32)	Ulisses	2013			
	Andranik Sargsyan	(Armenia)	MF	7 March 1985 (aged 29)	Gandzasar Kapan	2012			
	Gevorg Ohanyan	(Armenia)	MF	29 January 1992 (aged 22)	King Delux	2012			
	Tigran Gharabaghtsyan	(Armenia)	FW	6 June 1984 (aged 29)	Atyrau	2011			
	Karen Khachatryan	(Armenia)	FW	10 June 1985 (aged 28)	Shirak	2011			

== Transfers ==
=== In ===
Date	Position	Nationality	Name	From	Fee	Ref.
1 June 2013	MF	(Armenia)	David Grigoryan	Ulisses	Undisclosed	
1 July 2013	DF	(Armenia)	Arsen Balabekyan	Ulisses	Undisclosed	
1 July 2013	DF	(Iran)	Armen Tahmazyan	Esteghlal	Undisclosed	
1 July 2013	FW	(Armenia)	Mher Sahakyan	Impulse	Undisclosed	
14 July 2013	GK	(Armenia)	Manvel Afrikyan	Ulisses	Undisclosed	
17 July 2013	DF	(Serbia)	Miloš Stamenković	BSK Borča	Undisclosed	
22 July 2013	GK	(Armenia)	Stepan Ghazaryan	Banants	Undisclosed	
28 July 2013	MF	(Serbia)	Darko Bondzić	Radnički Nova Pazova	Undisclosed	
28 July 2013	FW	(Serbia)	Aleksandar Rakić	Cement Beočin	Undisclosed	
2 August 2013	MF	(Armenia)	Aram Bareghamyan	Ulisses	Undisclosed	
20 August 2013	GK	(Armenia)	Grigor Meliksetyan	Unattached	Free	
26 December 2013	DF	(Armenia)	Vachik Yeghiazaryan	Banants	Free	
1 January 2014	DF	(Armenia)	Artak Andrikyan	Ulisses	Undisclosed	
1 February 2014	MF	(Armenia)	Tigran Grigoryan	Alashkert	Undisclosed	
2 February 2014	MF	(Latvia)	Andrejs Perepļotkins	Daugava	Undisclosed	
17 February 2014	DF	(Bosnia and Herzegovina)	Kenan Čejvanović	Gorica	Undisclosed	
18 February 2014	MF	(Estonia)	Aleksandr Dubõkin	Jõhvi Lokomotiv	Undisclosed	
21 February 2014	MF	(Moldova)	Alexandru Pașcenco	Sheriff Tiraspol	Undisclosed	
26 February 2014	MF	(Belarus)	Eduard Chudnowski	BATE Borisov	Undisclosed	

=== Loans in ===
Date	Position	Nationality	Name	From	Fee	Ref.
1 July 2013	DF	(Armenia)	Mikayel Khashmanyan	Banants	31 December 2013	

=== Released ===
Date	Position	Nationality	Name	Joined	Date	Ref.
21 May 2013	FW	(Mali)	Yamadou Keita	Kruoja Pakruojis		
30 June 2013	GK	(Armenia)	Mayis Azizyan	Retired		
30 June 2013	GK	(Armenia)	Аrmаn Hovhannisyan			
30 June 2013	DF	(Armenia)	Rafael Harutyunyan			
30 June 2013	DF	(Armenia)	Rafael Safaryan			
30 June 2013	MF	(Armenia)	Arthur Minasyan	Retired		
30 June 2013	MF	(Armenia)	Karen Navoyan			
30 June 2013	MF	(Armenia)	Narek Petrosyan			
30 June 2013	MF	(Armenia)	Tigran Voskanyan			
1 December 2013	FW	(Armenia)	Karen Khachatryan	Retired		
8 December 2013	FW	(Armenia)	Tigran Gharabaghtsyan	Retired		
9 December 2013	GK	(Armenia)	Arsen Petrosyan	Gandzasar Kapan	1 July 2014	
9 December 2013	DF	(Armenia)	Hovhannes Grigoryan	Alashkert		
9 December 2013	MF	(Armenia)	Andranik Sargsyan	Alashkert	10 January 2014	
9 December 2013	FW	(Armenia)	Gevorg Ohanyan	Alashkert	31 December 2013	
20 February 2014	FW	(Armenia)	Galust Petrosyan	Retired		
30 June 2014	GK	(Armenia)	Stepan Ghazaryan	Alashkert	1 July 2014	
30 June 2014	GK	(Armenia)	Gor Matirosyan	Banants	16 July 2014	
30 June 2014	DF	(Armenia)	Artak Andrikyan	Alashkert	14 July 2014	
30 June 2014	DF	(Armenia)	Norayr Grigoryan	Banants		
30 June 2014	DF	(Iran)	Armen Tahmazyan	Ararat Tehran		
30 June 2014	DF	(Bosnia and Herzegovina)	Kenan Čejvanović	Sloboda Tuzla		
30 June 2014	DF	(Serbia)	Miloš Stamenković	Shirak	25 August 2014	
30 June 2014	MF	(Armenia)	Aram Bareghamyan	Alashkert	1 July 2014	
30 June 2014	MF	(Armenia)	David Grigoryan	Mika	1 July 2014	
30 June 2014	MF	(Armenia)	Tigran Grigoryan	Alashkert	29 July 2014	
30 June 2014	MF	(Armenia)	Avetik Kirakosyan	Retired		
30 June 2014	MF	(Armenia)	Khoren Veranyan	Gandzasar Kapan	14 July 2014	
30 June 2014	MF	(Belarus)	Eduard Chudnowski	Klezk	1 July 2014	
30 June 2014	MF	(Estonia)	Aleksandr Dubõkin	Sillamäe Kalev	20 July 2014	
30 June 2014	MF	(Latvia)	Andrejs Perepļotkins	ENAD Polis Chrysochous	3 August 2014	
30 June 2014	MF	(Moldova)	Alexandru Pașcenco	Zimbru Chișinău	1 July 2014	
30 June 2014	MF	(Serbia)	Darko Bondzić	Vevey United	1 January 2015	
30 June 2014	FW	(Armenia)	Arsen Balabekyan	Alashkert	1 July 2014	
30 June 2014	FW	(Armenia)	Gevorg Nranyan	Banants	1 July 2014	

== Friendlies ==
20 July 2013	Ararat Yerevan (Armenia)	2 – 0	(Serbia) Dunav Stari Banovci	Stara Pazova, Serbia
(UTC+4)	G.Nranyan; Trialist	Report

22 July 2013	Ararat Yerevan (Armenia)	1 – 2	(Israel) Hapoel Nir Ramat HaSharon	Stara Pazova, Serbia
(UTC+4)	T.Karabakhtsyan	Report	Goal

26 July 2013	Ararat Yerevan (Armenia)	1 – 1	(Israel) Hapoel Haifa	Stara Pazova, Serbia
(UTC+4)	Goal	Report	Goal

== Competitions ==
=== Premier League ===
==== Results summary ====
Overall								Home						Away					
Pld	W	D	L	GF	GA	GD	Pts	W	D	L	GF	GA	GD	W	D	L	GF	GA	GD
28	12	7	9	30	21	+9	43	5	3	6	18	14	+4	7	4	3	12	7	+5

==== Results by round ====
Round	1	2	3	4	5	6	7	8	9	10	11	12	13	14	15	16	17	18	19	20	21	22	23	24	25	26	27	28
Ground	A	H	A	H	A	H	A	H	A	H	A	H	A	H	A	H	A	H	A	H	A	H	A	H	A	H	A	H
Result	D	L	W	W	D	W	W	W	W	D	W	L	W	W	L	D	W	D	D	W	W	L	L	L	L	L	D	D
Position	6	8	6	4	4	2	1	1	1	1	1	1	1	1	1	1	1	1	1	1	1	1	1	2	2	4	4	4

Source: nifs.no
A = Away; H = Home; W = Win; D = Draw; L = Loss

==== Results ====
3 August 2013 1	Banants	0 – 0	Ararat Yerevan	Yerevan
18:00 (UTC+4)	Daghbashyan (yellow card) 50'	Summary		Stadium: Banants Stadium; Attendance: 500; Referee: Zaven Hovhannisyan

17 August 2013 2	Ararat Yerevan	0 – 1	Mika	Yerevan
19:00 (UTC+4)	D.Z.Grigoryan (yellow card) 5'; D.G.Grigoryan (yellow card) 28'	Summary	Alex 73'	Stadium: Hrazdan Stadium; Attendance: 500; Referee: Arman Ghushchyan

24 August 2013 3	Ulisses	0 – 1	Ararat Yerevan	Yerevan
19:00 (UTC+4)	Harutyunyan (yellow card) 37'	Summary	Nranyan 40'; Khachatryan (yellow card) 54'; H.Grigoryan (yellow card) 85'	Stadium: Republican Stadium; Attendance: 150; Referee: Zaven Hovhannisyan

31 August 2013 4	Ararat Yerevan	3 – 2	Gandzasar Kapan	Yerevan
19:00 (UTC+4)	N.Grigoryan 16'; Rakić 39', 77'; Mаrtirosyan (yellow card) 64'; Stamenković (yellow card) 68'	Summary	Vukomanović 58'; Beglaryan 90'	Stadium: Hrazdan Stadium; Attendance: 350; Referee: Suren Baliyan

14 September 2013 5	Shirak	1 – 1	Ararat Yerevan	Gyumri
17:00 (UTC+4)	Davoyan 51'; Barikyan (yellow card) 74'	Summary	Nranyan 44'; Kаrаpetyan (yellow card) 70'; Rakić (yellow card) 85'; Balabekyan (yellow card) 90+2'	Stadium: City Stadium; Attendance: 1,000; Referee: Zaven Hovhannisyan

21 September 2013 6	Ararat Yerevan	5 – 0	Alashkert	Yerevan
19:00 (UTC+4)	Rakić 17'; Veranyan 36'; Nranyan 44', 79'; Balabekyan 81'	Summary	Harutyunyan (yellow card) 83'; Beglaryan (yellow card) 86'	Stadium: Hrazdan Stadium; Attendance: 300; Referee: Suren Baliyan

28 September 2013 7	Pyunik	0 – 1	Ararat Yerevan	Yerevan
18:00 (UTC+4)		Summary	Rakić 47'; Mаrtirosyan (yellow card) 78'; Khachatryan (red card) 86'	Stadium: Football Academy Stadium; Attendance: 500; Referee: Suren Baliyan

19 October 2013 9	Mika	0 – 1	Ararat Yerevan	Yerevan
15:00 (UTC+4)	Adamyan (yellow card) 18'; Voskanyan (yellow card) 42'	Summary	D.Z.Grigoryan (yellow card) 42'; Rakić 85'; Veranyan (yellow card) 90+3'	Stadium: Mika Stadium; Attendance: 500; Referee: Tigran Hovsepyan

27 October 2013 10	Ararat Yerevan	2 – 0	Ulisses	Yerevan
18:00 (UTC+4)	Nranyan 19'; D.Z.Grigoryan 24'	Summary	Mirakyan (yellow card) 11'; Andrikyan (yellow card) 64'	Stadium: Hrazdan Stadium; Attendance: 300; Referee: Gevorg Eghoyan

30 October 2013 8	Ararat Yerevan	0 – 0	Banants	Yerevan
18:00 (UTC+4)	Veranyan (yellow card) 10'; Tahmazyan (yellow card) 50'; H.Grigoryan (yellow card) 57'; Rakić (yellow card) 66'	Summary	Daghbashyan (red card) 25'; Hovsepyan (yellow card) 63'; Arakelyan (yellow card) 64'	Stadium: Hrazdan Stadium; Attendance: 200; Referee: Suren Baliyan

2 November 2013 11	Gandzasar Kapan	0 – 1	Ararat Yerevan	Kapan
15:00 (UTC+4)	Petrosyan (yellow card) 90+5'; Mkoyan (red card) 90+5'	Summary	Mаrtirosyan 44'; H.Grigoryan (yellow card) 57'; Ghazaryan (yellow card) 90+5'; Bondzić (red card) 90+5'	Stadium: Gandzasar Stadium; Attendance: 1,000; Referee: Zaven Hovhannisyan

9 November 2013 12	Ararat Yerevan	0 – 3	Shirak	Yerevan
16:00 (UTC+4)		Summary	Diop 2'; Aleksanyan (yellow card) 27'; Déblé 33'; Muradyan 90'	Stadium: Hrazdan Stadium; Attendance: 200; Referee: Zaven Hovhannisyan

23 November 2013 13	Alashkert	0 – 3	Ararat Yerevan	Yerevan
16:00 (UTC+4)		Summary	Nranyan 13', 85'; Rakić 48'	Stadium: Republican Stadium; Attendance: 300; Referee: Gevorg Eghoyan

30 November 2013 14	Ararat Yerevan	2 – 0	Pyunik	Yerevan
16:00 (UTC+4)	Nranyan 3', 22'; Mаrtirosyan (yellow card) 33'; N.Grigoryan (yellow card) 77'	Summary	Sardaryan (yellow card) 21'; Haroyan (yellow card) 38'	Stadium: Hrazdan Stadium; Attendance: 250; Referee: Suren Baliyan

1 March 2014 15	Banants	2 – 1	Ararat Yerevan	Yerevan
14:00 (UTC+4)	Poghosyan 52'; Fofana (yellow card) 75'; Gogoladze 81'; Karapetyan (yellow card) 89'	Summary	Bareghamyan (yellow card) 38'; Perepļotkins 44'; N.Grigoryan (yellow card) 89'	Stadium: Banants Stadium; Attendance: 800; Referee: Zaven Hovhannisyan

8 March 2014 16	Ararat Yerevan	1 – 1	Mika	Yerevan
16:00 (UTC+4)	Čejvanović (yellow card) 68'; Rakić 82'	Summary	Sаtumyan 34'; Movsisyan (yellow card) 48'; Adamyan (yellow card) 50'	Stadium: Hrazdan Stadium; Attendance: 300; Referee: Suren Baliyan

15 March 2014 17	Ulisses	0 – 1	Ararat Yerevan	Yerevan
15:00 (UTC+4)	Sahakyan (yellow card) 90+1'	Summary	Čejvanović (yellow card) 38'; Perepļotkins 42'; Bondzić (yellow card) 56'; D.Z.Grigoryan (yellow card) 62'	Stadium: Hrazdan Stadium; Attendance: 250; Referee: Gevorg Eghoyan

22 March 2014 18	Ararat Yerevan	0 – 0	Gandzasar Kapan	Yerevan
17:00 (UTC+4)	Khachatryan (yellow card) 37'; Nranyan (yellow card) 45'; Čejvanović (red card) 50'; Grigoryan (yellow card) 72'; Rakić (yellow card) 81'	Summary	Hambartsumyan (yellow card) 38'; Tatintsyan (yellow card) 90+1'	Stadium: Hrazdan Stadium; Attendance: 500; Referee: Tigran Hovsepyan

29 March 2014 19	Shirak	0 – 0	Ararat Yerevan	Gyumri
15:00 (UTC+4)	Diop (yellow card) 35'	Summary	Balabekyan (yellow card) 71'; Sahakyan (yellow card) 82'; Grigoryan (yellow card) 85'	Stadium: Gyumri City Stadium; Attendance: 1,500; Referee: Suren Baliyan

5 April 2014 20	Ararat Yerevan	1 – 0	Alashkert	Yerevan
18:00 (UTC+4)	Čejvanović (yellow card) 66'; Rakić 85'	Summary		Stadium: Hrazdan Stadium; Attendance: 150; Referee: Zaven Hovhannisyan

12 April 2014 21	Pyunik	0 – 1	Ararat Yerevan	Yerevan
18:00 (UTC+4)	Sardaryan (yellow card) 15'; Baloyan (yellow card) 26'; A.Hovhannisyan (yellow card) 30'; Malakyan (yellow card) 70'	Summary	D.Z.Grigoryan 2'; Andrikyan (yellow card) 51'; Stamenković (yellow card) 64'	Stadium: Yerevan Football Academy Stadium; Attendance: 800; Referee: Suren Baliyan

19 April 2014 22	Ararat Yerevan	1 – 2	Banants	Yerevan
18:00 (UTC+4)	Meliksetyan (yellow card) 14'; Stamenković (yellow card) 36'; Rakić 65'; Nranyan (yellow card) 88'	Summary	Štepanovský 2' (yellow card) 33'; Hambardzumyan 83'	Stadium: Hrazdan Stadium; Attendance: 100; Referee: Zaven Hovhannisyan

23 April 2014 27	Alashkert	0 – 0	Ararat Yerevan	Yerevan
18:00 (UTC+4)	Arakelyan (yellow card) 46'; Na.Gyozalyan (yellow card) 67'	Summary	Grigoryan (yellow card) 40'; Mаrtirosyan (yellow card) 73'; Nranyan (yellow card) 89'	Stadium: Hrazdan Stadium; Attendance: 150; Referee: Tigran Hovsepyan

26 April 2014 23	Mika	2 – 0	Ararat Yerevan	Yerevan
17:00 (UTC+4)	Sаtumyan 13' (pen.); Barseghyan 16'; Petrosyan (yellow card) 25'	Summary	Stamenković (yellow card) 13'; D.Z.Grigoryan (yellow card) 37'; Balabekyan (yellow card) 61'; Mаrtirosyan (yellow card) 90+3'	Stadium: Mika Stadium; Attendance: 1,500; Referee: Suren Baliyan

30 April 2014 28	Ararat Yerevan	1 – 1	Pyunik	Yerevan
19:00 (UTC+4)	Nranyan (yellow card) 51'; Bareghamyan (yellow card) 67'; Bondzić (yellow card) 74'; Stamenković 87' (pen.)	Summary	Papikyan 15'; Aslanyan (red card) 30'	Stadium: Hrazdan Stadium; Attendance: 1,000; Referee: Zaven Hovhannisyan

3 May 2014 24	Ararat Yerevan	1 – 2	Ulisses	Yerevan
19:00 (UTC+4)	Rakić 19'	Summary	Harutyunyan (yellow card) 34'; Beglaryan (yellow card) 39' (goal) 90'; Sahakyan (yellow card) 60'; Hambardzumyan 63'; Alpuche (yellow card) 80'	Stadium: Hrazdan Stadium; Attendance: 250; Referee: Suren Baliyan

11 May 2014 25	Gandzasar Kapan	2 – 1	Ararat Yerevan	Kapan
17:00 (UTC+4)	Grigoryan (yellow card) 33'; Avagyan (yellow card) 37'; López 45'; Khachatryan 48'	Summary	Nranyan 34'	Stadium: Gandzasar Stadium; Attendance: 500; Referee: Zaven Hovhannisyan

18 May 2014 26	Ararat Yerevan	1 – 4	Shirak	Yerevan
17:00 (UTC+4)	Stamenković (yellow card) 37'; Bareghamyan 68'	Summary	Diop 31'; Barikyan 45'; Muradyan (yellow card) 48'; Déblé 50'; Ly 75'; Abrahamyan (yellow card) 80'	Stadium: Hrazdan Stadium; Attendance: 500; Referee: Suren Baliyan

==== Table ====
Pos	Team	Pld	W	D	L	GF	GA	GD	Pts	Qualification
2	Shirak	28	13	8	7	48	31	+17	47	Qualification for the Europa League first qualifying round
3	Mika	28	12	11	5	36	27	+9	47	Qualification for the Europa League first qualifying round
4	Ararat Yerevan	28	12	8	8	30	23	+7	44	
5	Gandzasar Kapan	28	8	11	9	36	31	+5	35	
6	Pyunik	28	8	8	12	41	39	+2	32	Qualification for the Europa League first qualifying round (Note: Winners of 2013–14 Armenian Cup will qualify for the first qualifying round of the UEFA Europa League.)

Source: Soccerway
Rules for classification: 1) points; 2) goal difference; 3) number of goals scored.

=== Armenian Cup ===
2 October 2013 Quarter-finals 1st leg	Pyunik	1 – 1	Ararat Yerevan	Yerevan
18:00 (UTC+4)	Poghosyan (yellow card) 45'; Papikyan 55' (yellow card) 90+1'	Summary	Stamenković (yellow card) 57'; Veranyan (yellow card) 67'; N.Grigoryan 74'	Stadium: Republican Stadium; Attendance: 300; Referee: Tigran Hovsepyan

6 November 2013 Quarter-finals 2nd leg	Ararat Yerevan	1 – 2 (2 – 3 agg.)	Pyunik	Abovyan
19:00 (UTC+4)	Balabekyan (yellow card) 31'; Rakić 45'; Khachatryan (yellow card) 66'	Summary	Bakalyan 14'; Ayvazyan 80'	Stadium: City Stadium; Attendance: 500; Referee: Suren Baliyan

== Statistics ==
As of match played 18 May 2014

=== Appearances and goals ===
No.	Pos	Nat	Player	Total		Premier League		Armenian Cup	
No.	Pos	Nat	Player	Apps	Goals	Apps	Goals	Apps	Goals
1	GK	(Armenia) ARM	Manvel Afrikyan	1	0	0+1	0	0	0
2	FW	(Armenia) ARM	Vаhe Mаrtirosyan	26	1	24	1	2	0
3	DF	(Serbia) SRB	Miloš Stamenković	26	1	23+1	1	2	0
4	DF	(Armenia) ARM	Armen Durunts	5	0	2+2	0	1	0
5	DF	(Armenia) ARM	Norayr Grigoryan	27	2	25	1	2	1
6	DF	(Iran) IRI	Armen Tahmazyan	5	0	4+1	0	0	0
7	FW	(Serbia) SRB	Aleksandar Rakić	30	11	24+4	10	2	1
8	MF	(Armenia) ARM	David Grigoryan	28	2	20+6	2	1+1	0
9	FW	(Armenia) ARM	Gevorg Nranyan	28	10	24+3	10	1	0
10	FW	(Latvia) LAT	Andrejs Perepļotkins	12	2	7+5	2	0	0
11	FW	(Armenia) ARM	Arsen Balabekyan	26	1	9+15	1	1+1	0
12	GK	(Armenia) ARM	Grigor Meliksetyan	1	0	0	0	1	0
13	MF	(Belarus) BLR	Eduard Chudnovsky	2	0	0+2	0	0	0
14	MF	(Armenia) ARM	Aram Bareghamyan	25	1	16+7	1	2	0
15	MF	(Armenia) ARM	David G. Grigoryan	8	0	4+3	0	0+1	0
17	MF	(Estonia) EST	Aleksandr Dubokin	2	0	1+1	0	0	0
18	DF	(Armenia) ARM	Gorik Khachatryan	25	0	24	0	1	0
19	DF	(Armenia) ARM	Vаchаgаn Kаrаpetyan	4	0	0+3	0	1	0
20	MF	(Serbia) SRB	Darko Bondzić	28	0	21+6	0	1	0
21	MF	(Armenia) ARM	Avetik Kirakosyan	5	0	2+3	0	0	0
22	GK	(Armenia) ARM	Stepan Ghazaryan	29	0	28	0	1	0
25	DF	(Armenia) ARM	Artak Andrikyan	6	0	6	0	0	0
36	FW	(Armenia) ARM	Mher Sahakyan	12	0	3+7	0	0+2	0
86	DF	(Bosnia and Herzegovina) BIH	Kenan Čejvanović	9	0	9	0	0	0
89	MF	(Moldova) MDA	Alexandru Pascenco	6	0	3+3	0	0	0
	MF	(Armenia) ARM	Khoren Veranyan	22	1	19+1	1	2	0
Players who left Ararat Yerevan during the season:
10	FW	(Armenia) ARM	Galust Petrosyan	2	0	1+1	0	0	0
	DF	(Armenia) ARM	Hovhannes Grigoryan	11	0	9+1	0	1	0
	MF	(Armenia) ARM	Andranik Sargsyan	2	0	0+2	0	0	0
	FW	(Armenia) ARM	Gevorg Ohanyan	1	0	0+1	0	0	0

=== Goal scorers ===
Place	Position	Nation	Number	Name	Premier League	Armenian Cup	Total
1	FW	(Serbia)	7	Aleksandar Rakić	10	1	11
2	FW	(Armenia)	9	Gevorg Nranyan	10	0	10
3	MF	(Armenia)	8	David Grigoryan	2	0	2
3	FW	(Latvia)	10	Andrejs Perepļotkins	2	0	2
3	DF	(Armenia)	5	Norayr Grigoryan	1	1	2
6	MF	(Armenia)	17	Khoren Veranyan	1	0	1
6	FW	(Armenia)	11	Arsen Balabekyan	1	0	1
6	DF	(Armenia)	2	Vаhe Mаrtirosyan	1	0	1
6	DF	(Serbia)	3	Miloš Stamenković	1	0	1
6	DF	(Armenia)	14	Aram Bareghamyan	1	0	1
				TOTALS	30	2	32

=== Clean sheets ===
Place	Position	Nation	Number	Name	Premier League	Armenian Cup	Total
1	GK	(Armenia)	22	Stepan Ghazaryan	16	0	16
				TOTALS	16	0	16

=== Disciplinary record ===
Number	Nation	Position	Name	Premier League		Armenian Cup		Total	
Number	Nation	Position	Name	Yellow card	Red card	Yellow card	Red card	Yellow card	Red card
2	(Armenia)	DF	Vаhe Mаrtirosyan	5	0	0	0	5	0
3	(Serbia)	DF	Miloš Stamenković	5	0	1	0	6	0
5	(Armenia)	DF	Norayr Grigoryan	5	0	0	0	5	0
6	(Iran)	DF	Armen Tahmazyan	1	0	0	0	1	0
7	(Serbia)	FW	Aleksandar Rakić	3	0	0	0	3	0
8	(Armenia)	MF	David Grigoryan	4	0	0	0	4	0
9	(Armenia)	FW	Gevorg Nranyan	4	0	0	0	4	0
11	(Armenia)	FW	Arsen Balabekyan	3	0	1	0	4	0
12	(Armenia)	GK	Grigor Meliksetyan	1	0	0	0	1	0
14	(Armenia)	DF	Aram Bareghamyan	2	0	0	0	2	0
15	(Armenia)	MF	David G. Grigoryan	1	0	0	0	1	0
17	(Armenia)	MF	Khoren Veranyan	2	0	1	0	3	0
18	(Armenia)	DF	Gorik Khachatryan	2	1	1	0	2	1
19	(Armenia)	DF	Vаchаgаn Kаrаpetyan	1	0	0	0	1	0
20	(Serbia)	MF	Darko Bondzić	2	1	0	0	2	1
22	(Armenia)	GK	Stepan Ghazaryan	1	0	0	0	1	0
25	(Armenia)	DF	Artak Andrikyan	1	0	0	0	1	0
36	(Armenia)	FW	Mher Sahakyan	1	0	0	0	1	0
86	(Bosnia and Herzegovina)	DF	Kenan Čejvanović	3	1	0	0	3	1
Players who left Ararat Yerevan during the season:
	(Armenia)	DF	Hovhannes Grigoryan	3	0	0	0	3	0
			TOTALS	50	3	4	0	54	3
