= 2011 Ulisses FC season =

Ulisses
2011 season
- Stadium: Hrazdan Stadium
- Premier League: 1st
- Armenian Cup: Semifinal vs Shirak
- Europa League: First qualifying round vs Ferencváros
- Top goalscorer: League: Giorgi Krasovski (8); All: Two Players (8)

The 2011 season was Ulisses's eleventh season in the Armenian Premier League. They finished the seasons as Champions of the Armenian Premier League and were knocked out of the Armenian Cup by Shirak in the Semifinals and by Ferencváros in the First qualifying round of the Europa League.

== Squad ==
Note: Flags indicate national team as defined under FIFA eligibility rules; some limited exceptions apply. Players may hold more than one non-FIFA nationality.

No.	Pos.	Nation	Player
1	GK	RUS	Vladimir Malkov
3	DF	ARM	Tigran Hakhnazaryan
7	FW	ARM	Mihran Manasyan
8	MF	ARM	David Grigoryan
9	FW	GEO	Shota Jikia
10	FW	ARM	Artyom Adamyan
14	MF	ARM	Avetik Kirakosyan
15	MF	ARM	Aram Bareghamyan
17	DF	GEO	Tengiz Ugrekhelidze
18	DF	ARM	Mikhail Simonyan
19	FW	ARM	Albert Tadevosyan

No.	Pos.	Nation	Player
22	GK	ARM	Manvel Afrikyan
24	DF	ARM	Artak Andrikyan
26	DF	GEO	Levan Akobia
27	FW	CIV	Samuel Zokou
33	MF	ARM	Artak Grigoryan
39	FW	ARM	Gevorg Nranyan
77	MF	GEO	Giorgi Krasovski
87	MF	ARM	Norayr Sahakyan
90	MF	ARM	Artavazd Boyajyan
91	MF	CGO	Lie Pato Ngavouka-Tseke
—	MF	ARM	Henrik Harutyunyan

== Transfers ==
=== In ===
Date	Position	Nationality	Name	From	Fee	Ref.
1 January 2011	DF	(Armenia)	Valeri Aleksanyan	Gandzasar Kapan	Undisclosed	
1 January 2011	DF	(Armenia)	Gevorg Nranyan	Impuls	Undisclosed	
1 January 2011	DF	(Georgia (country))	Levan Akobia	Zugdidi	Undisclosed	
1 January 2011	MF	(Armenia)	Aram Bareghamyan	Banants	Undisclosed	
1 January 2011	MF	(Armenia)	Artavazd Boyajyan	Gandzasar Kapan	Undisclosed	
1 January 2011	MF	(Brazil)	Renato	Rudar Velenje	Undisclosed	
1 January 2011	FW	(Ivory Coast)	Samuel Zokou	Africa Sports	Undisclosed	
1 July 2011	DF	(Armenia)	Mikheil Simonyan	Impuls	Undisclosed	

=== Out ===
Date	Position	Nationality	Name	From	Fee	Ref.
1 July 2011	DF	(Armenia)	Valeri Aleksanyan	Sanat Naft	Undisclosed	
1 August 2011	DF	(Georgia (country))	Levan Akobia	Zugdidi	Undisclosed	

=== Released ===
Date	Position	Nationality	Name	Joined	Date
31 December 2011	DF	(Armenia)	Norayr Grigoryan	Gandzasar Kapan	1 January 2011
31 December 2011	DF	(Armenia)	Aleksandr Petrosyan	Mes Kerman	1 January 2011
31 December 2011	MF	(Armenia)	Karen Aleksanyan	Shirak	1 January 2011
31 December 2011	MF	(Armenia)	Armen Tigranyan	Shirak	1 January 2011
31 December 2011	MF	(Georgia (country))	Gaga Tibilashvili	Impuls	1 January 2011
31 December 2011	FW	(Armenia)	Ara Hakobyan	Mes Kerman	1 January 2011
30 June 2011	MF	(Brazil)	Renato		
30 June 2011	MF	(Armenia)	Henrik Harutyunyan	Mika	1 January 2012
30 June 2011	FW	(Armenia)	Artak Aghababyan		

== Competitions ==
=== Premier League ===
==== Results summary ====
Overall								Home						Away					
Pld	W	D	L	GF	GA	GD	Pts	W	D	L	GF	GA	GD	W	D	L	GF	GA	GD
28	15	8	5	38	22	+16	53	7	4	3	18	10	+8	8	4	2	20	12	+8

Last updated: 5 November 2011.
Source: See Results

==== Results ====
24 March 2011 1	Gandzasar Kapan	0 – 0	Ulisses	Kapan
15:00 (UTC+4)		Report		Stadium: Gandzasar Stadium; Attendance: 1,000; Referee: Manuk Fahradyan

19 March 2011 2	Banants	1 – 3	Ulisses	Yerevan
15:00 (UTC+4)	W.Poghosyan (yellow card) 20'; Correa 45'	Report	A.Grigoryan (yellow card) 47'; A.Adamyan 61'; T.Hakhnazaryan (yellow card) 80'; Sahakyan 83'; Krasovski 87'	Stadium: Banants Stadium; Attendance: 1,000; Referee: Suren Baliyan

2 April 2011 3	Ulisses	1 – 0	Pyunik	Yerevan
15:00 (UTC+4)	Sahakyan (yellow card) 73'; A.Adamyan 88'	Report		Stadium: Hrazdan Stadium; Attendance: 600; Referee: Suren Baliyan

10 April 2011 4	Shirak	1 – 3	Ulisses	Ijevan
15:00 (UTC+4)	H.Mnatsakanyan (yellow card) 26'; K.Khachatryan 42'	Report	Krasovski 29', 36'; Aleksanyan 59' (yellow card) 59'	Stadium: Arnar Stadium; Attendance: 150; Referee: Gevorg Eghoyan

17 April 2011 5	Ulisses	3 – 0	Ararat Yerevan	Yerevan
15:00 (UTC+4)	D.Grigoryan 31'; A.Grigoryan 48'; G.Nranyan 76'; A.Andrikyan (yellow card) 78'	Report		Stadium: Hrazdan Stadium; Attendance: 100; Referee: Manuk Fahradyan

23 April 2011 6	Mika	2 – 3	Ulisses	Yerevan
15:00 (UTC+4)	Mkoyan (yellow card) 53'; Mkrtchyan (yellow card) 56' (goal) 75'; Beglaryan 83'	Report	A.Grigoryan 15'; A.Adamyan 22' (pen.); S.Jikia 51'; A.Andrikyan (yellow card) 67'	Stadium: Mika Stadium; Attendance: 1,000; Referee: Suren Baliyan

30 April 2011 7	Ulisses	0 – 1	Impuls	Yerevan
16:00 (UTC+4)	H.Harutyunyan (yellow card) 90+5'	Report	V.Yeghiazaryan (yellow card) 27'; Harkusha 56'	Stadium: Hrazdan Stadium; Attendance: 350; Referee: Manuk Fahradyan

8 May 2011 8	Ulisses	0 – 0	Gandzasar Kapan	Yerevan
16:00 (UTC+4)		Report	Kocharyan (yellow card) 50'; L.Bubuteishvili (yellow card) 73'	Stadium: Hrazdan Stadium; Attendance: 600; Referee: Andranik Arsenyan

15 May 2011 9	Ulisses	1 – 0	Banants	Yerevan
17:00 (UTC+4)	A.Grigoryan 71'	Report		Stadium: Hrazdan Stadium; Attendance: 500; Referee: Gevorg Eghoyan

22 May 2011 10	Pyunik	3 – 1	Ulisses	Yerevan
18:00 (UTC+4)	Pizzelli 17'; H.Hovhannisyan 35', 50'; S.Hovsepyan (yellow card) 81'; Haroyan (yellow card) 85'	Report	D.Grigoryan 62'; Krasovski (yellow card) 79'	Stadium: Vazgen Sargsyan Republican Stadium; Attendance: 1,200; Referee: Andranik Arsenyan

29 May 2011 11	Ulisses	1 – 0	Shirak	Yerevan
17:00 (UTC+4)	A.Bareghamyan 70'	Report	A.Oseyan (yellow card) 79'	Stadium: Hrazdan Stadium; Attendance: 300; Referee: Gevorg Eghoyan

12 June 2011 12	Ararat Yerevan	1 – 1	Ulisses	Yerevan
18:00 (UTC+4)	Karapetyan 44'; Hakobyan (yellow card) 62'	Report	D.Grigoryan 17'	Stadium: Hrazdan Stadium; Attendance: 150; Referee: Manuk Fahradyan

19 June 2011 13	Ulisses	1 – 2	Mika	Yerevan
18:00 (UTC+4)	A.Adamyan 15'; D.Grigoryan (yellow card) 71'	Report	Minasyan (yellow card) 15'; S.Muradyan 42'; Kasparov (yellow card) 65'; Mkoyan (yellow card) 78'; Fangzhuo 87'	Stadium: Hrazdan Stadium; Attendance: 600; Referee: Andranik Arsenyan

25 June 2011 14	Impuls	0 – 1	Ulisses	Ijevan
18:00 (UTC+4)	Elton Luis (yellow card) 90+2'	Report	A.Adamyan 31'; S.Jikia (yellow card) 81'; A.Grigoryan (yellow card) 82'	Stadium: Arnar Stadium; Attendance: 300; Referee: Gevorg Eghoyan

23 July 2011 15	Gandzasar Kapan	0 – 1	Ulisses	Kapan
18:00 (UTC+4)	A.Tatintsyan (yellow card) 22'	Report	N.Ngavouka-Tseke (yellow card) 9'; Krasovski 23'; L.Akobia (yellow card) 45+1'; Ugrekhelidze (yellow card) 48'	Stadium: Gandzasar Stadium; Attendance: 3,500; Referee: Andranik Arsenyan

31 July 2011 16	Banants	2 – 1	Ulisses	Yerevan
18:00 (UTC+4)	A.Arakelyan (yellow card) 58'; Bruno 78', 84'	Report	Krasovski 59' (pen.); N.Pato (yellow card) 90+3'; D.Grigoryan (yellow card) 90+4'	Stadium: Banants Stadium; Attendance: 500; Referee: Arman Amirkhanyan

6 August 2011 17	Ulisses	1 – 1	Pyunik	Yerevan
17:00 (UTC+4)	S.Zokou 55'	Report	Manucharyan 3'	Stadium: Hrazdan Stadium; Attendance: 150; Referee: Suren Baliyan

13 August 2011 18	Shirak	0 – 2	Ulisses	Ijevan
17:00 (UTC+4)	A.Ghazaryan (yellow card) 43' (yellow-red card) 49'; G.Sargsyan (red card) 45+2'	Report	A.Grigoryan 29' (yellow card) 60'; D.Grigoryan (yellow card) 53'; A.Tadevosyan 87'	Stadium: Arnar Stadium; Attendance: 150; Referee: Manuk Fahradyan

20 August 2011 19	Ulisses	5 – 0	Ararat Yerevan	Yerevan
17:00 (UTC+4)	L.Ngavouka-Tseke 4'; A.Bareghamyan 33'; S.Jikia 50'; A.Tadevosyan 81'; Krasovski 89'	Report	K.Avoyan (yellow card) 26'; V.Karapetyan (yellow card) 35'; A.Petrosyan (yellow card) 87'	Stadium: Hrazdan Stadium; Attendance: 300; Referee: Manuk Fahradyan

28 August 2011 20	Mika	0 – 1	Ulisses	Yerevan
17:00 (UTC+4)	Alex (red card) 55'	Report	A.Adamyan 78'; L.Ngavouka-Tseke (yellow card) 90+2'	Stadium: Mika Stadium; Attendance: 1,000; Referee: Arman Amirkhanyan

10 September 2011 21	Ulisses	2 – 1	Impuls	Yerevan
16:00 (UTC+4)	J.Gimenez 29' (o.g.); A.Grigoryan (yellow card) 33' (goal) 36'; T.Hakhnazaryan (yellow card) 49'	Report	Badoyan 49' (pen.); Hovsepyan (yellow card) 90+1'	Stadium: Hrazdan Stadium; Attendance: 350; Referee: Andranik Arsenyan

18 September 2011 22	Ulisses	0 – 0	Gandzasar Kapan	Yerevan
16:00 (UTC+4)	Krasovski (yellow card) 45+1'; A.Adamyan (yellow card) 88'	Report		Stadium: Hrazdan Stadium; Attendance: 1,000; Referee: Suren Baliyan

14 September 2011 23	Ulisses	1 – 0	Banants	Yerevan
16:00 (UTC+4)	T.Hakhnazaryan (yellow card) 10'; A.Adamyan 55'	Report	Kavatsiv (yellow card) 85'; Bruno (yellow card) 90+4'	Stadium: Hrazdan Stadium; Attendance: 300; Referee: Arman Amirkhanyan

1 October 2011 24	Pyunik	0 – 0	Ulisses	Yerevan
18:00 (UTC+4)		Report	A.Tadevosyan (yellow card) 27'	Stadium: Vazgen Sargsyan Republican Stadium; Attendance: 1,000; Referee: Suren Baliyan

16 October 2011 25	Ulisses	2 – 2	Shirak	Yerevan
14:00 (UTC+4)	D.Grigoryan (yellow card) 36'; Krasovski 66', 79'	Report	A.Barikyan 64', 71'	Stadium: Hrazdan Stadium; Attendance: 300; Referee: Andranik Arsenyan

22 October 2011 26	Ararat Yerevan	1 – 2	Ulisses	Yerevan
14:00 (UTC+4)	K.Veranyan 26' (pen.)	Report	Ugrekhelidze (yellow card) 25'; M.Simonyan 28'; D.Grigoryan 45+2'	Stadium: Hrazdan Stadium; Attendance: 150; Referee: Andranik Gabrielyan

29 October 2011 27	Ulisses	0 – 3	Mika	Yerevan
15:00 (UTC+4)		Report	Mkoyan (yellow card) 42'; A.Petrosyan (yellow card) 53'; Beglaryan 56', 68'; Mkrtchyan (yellow card) 59'; S.Muradyan 88'	Stadium: Hrazdan Stadium; Attendance: 180; Referee: Suren Baliyan

5 November 2011 28	Impuls	1 – 1	Ulisses	Abovyan
14:00 (UTC+4)	V.Ayvazyan 73'	Report	S.Zokou 9' (yellow card) 67'; A.Grigoryan (yellow card) 41'	Stadium: Abovyan City Stadium; Attendance: 150; Referee: Gevorg Eghoyan

==== Table ====
Pos	Team	Pld	W	D	L	GF	GA	GD	Pts	Qualification
1	Ulisses (C)	28	15	8	5	38	22	+16	53	Qualification for the Champions League second qualifying round
2	Pyunik	28	12	10	6	33	28	+5	46	Qualification for the Europa League first qualifying round
3	Gandzasar Kapan	28	12	10	6	31	18	+13	46	Qualification for the Europa League first qualifying round
4	Banants	28	12	8	8	42	30	+12	44	
5	Mika	28	12	8	8	36	25	+11	44	

Rules for classification: 1) points; 2) goal difference; 3) number of goals scored.
(C) Champions

=== Armenian Cup ===
==== 2011 ====
10 March 2011 Quarterfinal 1st leg	Ulisses	1 – 0	Ararat Yerevan	Yerevan
15:00 (UTC+4)	A.Adamyan 77'	Report	V.Meytikhanyan (yellow card) 55'	Stadium: Hrazdan Stadium; Attendance: 100; Referee: Andranik Arsenyan

14 March 2011 Quarterfinal 2nd leg	Ararat Yerevan	0 – 1 (0 – 2 agg.)	Ulisses	Yerevan
15:00 (UTC+4)	R.Safaryan (yellow card) 11'; V.Martirosyan (yellow card) 20'; A.Hovhannisyan (yellow card) 60'	Report	M.Manasyan 30' (yellow card) 60'; A.Grigoryan (yellow card) 89'	Stadium: Hrazdan Stadium; Attendance: 250; Referee: Manuk Fahradyan

6 April 2011 Semifinal 1st leg	Shirak	0 – 1	Ulisses	Ijevan
15:00 (UTC+4)	Aleksanyan (yellow card) 75'	Report	A.Adamyan (yellow card) 22'; G.Nranyan 90+3'	Stadium: Arnar Stadium; Attendance: 600; Referee: Andranik Arsenyan

27 April 2011 Semifinal 2nd leg	Ulisses	0 – 2 (a.e.t.) (1 – 2 agg.)	Shirak	Yerevan
15:00 (UTC+4)	Krasovski (yellow card) 22' (yellow-red card) 119'; L.Akobia (red card) 34'; M.Manasyan (yellow card) 119'	Report	H.Grigoryan 30'; A.Barikyan (yellow card) 34'; Davtyan (yellow card) 78'; M.Nalbandyan 99' (yellow card) 99'; A.Mkrtchyan (yellow card) 108'; Hovhannisyan (yellow card) 112'	Stadium: Hrazdan Stadium; Attendance: 2,500; Referee: Suren Baliyan

==== 2011–12 ====
19 November 2011 Quarterfinal 1st leg	Ulisses	3 – 1	Ararat Yerevan	Yerevan
14:00 (UTC+4)	Krasovski 54', 76'; S.Jikia (yellow card) 80' (goal) 90+3'	Report	R.Safaryan (yellow card) 27'; A.Loretsyan 42'; G.Khachatryan (yellow card) 66'	Stadium: Hrazdan Stadium; Attendance: 100; Referee: Arman Ghushchyan

23 November 2011 Quarterfinal 2nd leg	Ararat Yerevan	3 – 2 (4 – 5 agg.)	Ulisses	Yerevan
13:00 (UTC+4)	K, Veranyan 12', 27'; Karapetyan 89'	Report	N.Pato 18', 58'; E.Hovhannisyan (yellow card) 26'; M.Simonyan (yellow card) 57' (yellow-red card) 88'	Stadium: Hrazdan Stadium; Attendance: 100; Referee: Gevorg Eghoyan

The Semifinal took place during the 2012–13 season.

=== UEFA Europa League ===
==== Qualifying rounds ====
30 June 2011 First qualifying round 1st leg	Ferencváros (Hungary)	3 – 0	(Armenia) Ulisses	Budapest, Hungary
21:00 (UTC+4)	Józsi 31'; Otten 33'; Maróti (yellow card) 45'; Félix 69'	Report	A.Bareghamyan (yellow card) 39'	Stadium: Stadion Albert Flórián; Attendance: 6,600; Referee: Slavko Vinčić (Slovenia)

7 July 2011 First qualifying round 2nd leg	Ulisses (Armenia)	0 – 2 (0 – 5 agg.)	(Hungary) Ferencváros	Yerevan, Armenia
18:00 (UTC+4)	Grigoryan (yellow card) 15'; S.Zokou (yellow card) 77'	Report	Abdi 35' (pen.); Oláh 90+7'	Stadium: Hrazdan Stadium; Attendance: 1,500; Referee: Oleksandr Derdo (Ukraine)

== Statistics ==
As of match played 7 July 2011

=== Appearances and goals ===
No.	Pos	Nat	Player	Total		Premier League		2011 Armenian Cup		2011–12 Armenian Cup		Europa League	
No.	Pos	Nat	Player	Apps	Goals	Apps	Goals	Apps	Goals	Apps	Goals	Apps	Goals
1	GK	(Russia) RUS	Vladimir Malkov	32	0	26	0	4	0	0	0	2	0
3	DF	(Armenia) ARM	Tigran Hakhnazaryan	35	0	27	0	4	0	2	0	2	0
7	FW	(Armenia) ARM	Mihran Manasyan	12	1	3+4	0	2+2	1	0	0	0+1	0
8	MF	(Armenia) ARM	David Grigoryan	27	4	18+5	4	1	0	1	0	1+1	0
9	FW	(Georgia (country)) GEO	Shota Jikia	36	3	18+10	2	3+1	0	1+1	1	1+1	0
10	FW	(Armenia) ARM	Artyom Adamyan	30	8	18+6	7	4	1	0	0	2	0
14	MF	(Armenia) ARM	Avetik Kirakosyan	1	0	0	0	0	0	0+1	0	0	0
15	MF	(Armenia) ARM	Aram Bareghamyan	33	2	18+8	2	1+2	0	2	0	2	0
17	DF	(Georgia (country)) GEO	Tengiz Ugrekhelidze	34	0	25+1	0	4	0	2	0	2	0
18	DF	(Armenia) ARM	Mikhail Simonyan	16	1	14	1	0	0	2	0	0	0
19	FW	(Armenia) ARM	Albert Tadevosyan	15	2	3+8	2	0+2	0	1+1	0	0	0
22	GK	(Armenia) ARM	Manvel Afrikyan	3	0	2	0	0	0	1	0	0	0
24	DF	(Armenia) ARM	Artak Andrikyan	30	0	24+1	0	3	0	0	0	2	0
27	FW	(Ivory Coast) CIV	Samuel Zokou	19	2	10+5	2	0	0	1+1	0	2	0
33	MF	(Armenia) ARM	Artak Grigoryan	35	5	27	5	4	0	2	0	2	0
39	FW	(Armenia) ARM	Gevorg Nranyan	18	2	3+11	1	0+2	1	0	0	0+2	0
77	MF	(Georgia (country)) GEO	Giorgi Krasovski	33	10	24+1	8	4	0	2	2	2	0
87	MF	(Armenia) ARM	Norayr Sahakyan	30	1	8+15	1	3	0	2	0	1+1	0
90	MF	(Armenia) ARM	Artavazd Boyajyan	2	0	1	0	0	0	0+1	0	0	0
91	MF	(Republic of the Congo) CGO	Lie Pato Ngavouka-Tseke	25	3	13+7	1	0+2	0	2	2	1	0
99	GK	(Armenia) ARM	Edvard Hovhannisyan	1	0	0	0	0	0	1	0	0	0
	FW	(Armenia) ARM	Gegham Harutyunyan	1	0	0	0	0	0	0+1	0	0	0
Players away on loan:
Players who left Ulisses during the season:
11	MF	(Brazil) BRA	Renato	10	0	7	0	2+1	0	0	0	0	0
18	FW	(Armenia) ARM	Artak Aghababyan	4	0	0+4	0	0	0	0	0	0	0
18	MF	(Armenia) ARM	Henrik Harutyunyan	1	0	0+1	0	0	0	0	0	0	0
20	DF	(Armenia) ARM	Valeri Aleksanyan	14	1	11	1	3	0	0	0	0	0
26	DF	(Georgia (country)) GEO	Levan Akobia	11	0	8+1	0	2	0	0	0	0	0

=== Goal scorers ===
Place	Position	Nation	Number	Name	Premier League	2011 Armenian Cup	2011–12 Armenian Cup	Europa League	Total
1	MF	(Georgia (country))	77	Giorgi Krasovski	8	0	2	0	10
2	FW	(Armenia)	10	Artyom Adamyan	7	1	0	0	8
3	MF	(Armenia)	33	Artak Grigoryan	5	0	0	0	5
4	MF	(Armenia)	8	David Grigoryan	4	0	0	0	4
5	FW	(Georgia (country))	9	Shota Jikia	2	0	1	0	3
5	MF	(Republic of the Congo)	91	Lie Pato Ngavouka-Tseke	1	0	2	0	3
7	MF	(Armenia)	15	Aram Bareghamyan	2	0	0	0	2
7	FW	(Armenia)	19	Albert Tadevosyan	2	0	0	0	2
7	FW	(Ivory Coast)	27	Samuel Zokou	2	0	0	0	2
7	FW	(Armenia)	39	Gevorg Nranyan	1	1	0	0	2
11	DF	(Armenia)	20	Valeri Aleksanyan	1	0	0	0	1
11	DF	(Armenia)	18	Mikhail Simonyan	1	0	0	0	1
11	MF	(Armenia)	87	Norayr Sahakyan	1	0	0	0	1
11	FW	(Armenia)	7	Mihran Manasyan	0	1	0	0	1
11				Own goal	1	0	0	0	1
				TOTALS	38	3	5	0	46

=== Clean sheets ===
Place	Position	Nation	Number	Name	Premier League	2011 Armenian Cup	2011–12 Armenian Cup	Europa League	Total
1	GK	(Russia)	1	Vladimir Malkov	14	3	0	0	17
				TOTALS	14	3	0	0	17

=== Disciplinary record ===
Number	Nation	Position	Name	Premier League		2011 Armenian Cup		2011–12 Armenian Cup		Europa League		Total	
Number	Nation	Position	Name	Yellow card	Red card	Yellow card	Red card	Yellow card	Red card	Yellow card	Red card	Yellow card	Red card
3	(Armenia)	DF	Tigran Hakhnazaryan	3	0	0	0	0	0	0	0	3	0
7	(Armenia)	FW	Mihran Manasyan	0	0	2	0	0	0	0	0	2	0
8	(Armenia)	MF	David Grigoryan	4	0	0	0	0	0	0	0	4	0
9	(Georgia (country))	FW	Shota Jikia	1	0	0	0	1	0	0	0	2	0
10	(Armenia)	FW	Artyom Adamyan	1	0	1	0	0	0	0	0	2	0
15	(Armenia)	MF	Aram Bareghamyan	0	0	0	0	0	0	1	0	1	0
17	(Georgia (country))	DF	Tengiz Ugrekhelidze	2	0	0	0	0	0	0	0	2	0
18	(Armenia)	DF	Mikhail Simonyan	0	0	0	0	2	1	0	0	2	1
19	(Armenia)	FW	Albert Tadevosyan	1	0	0	0	0	0	0	0	1	0
24	(Armenia)	DF	Artak Andrikyan	2	0	0	0	0	0	0	0	2	0
27	(Ivory Coast)	FW	Samuel Zokou	1	0	0	0	0	0	1	0	2	0
33	(Armenia)	MF	Artak Grigoryan	5	0	1	0	0	0	1	0	7	0
77	(Georgia (country))	MF	Giorgi Krasovski	2	0	2	1	0	0	0	0	4	1
87	(Armenia)	MF	Norayr Sahakyan	1	0	0	0	0	0	0	0	1	0
91	(Republic of the Congo)	MF	Lie Pato Ngavouka-Tseke	3	0	0	0	0	0	0	0	3	0
99	(Armenia)	GK	Edvard Hovhannisyan	0	0	0	0	1	0	0	0	1	0
Players who left Ulisses during the season:
18	(Armenia)	MF	Henrik Harutyunyan	1	0	0	0	0	0	0	0	1	0
20	(Armenia)	DF	Valeri Aleksanyan	1	0	0	0	0	0	0	0	1	0
26	(Georgia (country))	DF	Levan Akobia	1	0	0	1	0	0	0	0	1	1
			TOTALS	29	0	6	2	4	1	3	0	42	3
