= List of Armenian footballers =

This is a list of football (soccer) players from Armenia or of Armenian descent.

Contents:	Top - A B C D E F G H I J K L M N O P Q R S T U V W X Y Z

== A ==
- Harutyun Abrahamyan
- Armen Adamyan
- Sargis Adamyan
- Arkadi Akopyan
- Andrey Akopyants
- Artak Aleksanyan
- Karen Aleksanyan
- Valeri Aleksanyan
- Armen Ambartsumyan
- Arkady Andreasyan
- Ararat Arakelyan
- Can Arat
- Robert Arzumanyan
- Éric Assadourian
- Rudolf Atamalyan
- Garnik Avalyan
- Charles Avedisian
- Arsen Avetisyan
- Mayis Azizyan

== B ==
- Armen Babalaryan
- Artashes Baghdasaryan
- Arsen Balabekyan
- Tigran Barseghyan
- Henrik Batikyan
- Khoren Bayramyan
- Pascal Bedrossian
- Narek Beglaryan
- Roman Berezovsky
- Edmond Bezik
- Vahan Bichakhchyan
- Alain Boghossian
- Joaquín Boghossian

== C ==
- Andre Calisir
- Efrain Chacurian
- Hagop Chirishian

== D ==
- Artak Dashyan
- Hovhannes Demirchyan
- Michel Der Zakarian
- Yuri Djorkaeff
- Karen Dokhoyan
- Agop Donabidian

== E ==
- Eduard Eranosyan
- Nshan Erzrumyan
- Sergey Erzrumyan
- Alecko Eskandarian
- Andranik Eskandarian

== G ==
- Poghos Galstyan
- Vahan Gevorgyan
- Tigran Gharabaghtsyan
- Wartan Ghazarian
- Gevorg Ghazaryan
- Stepan Ghazaryan
- Hovhannes Goharyan
- Artak Grigoryan
- David Grigoryan (pesepak bola, kelahiran tahun 1982)
- David G. Grigoryan
- Razmik Grigoryan
- Mauro Guevgeozián
- Artur Geworkýan

== H ==
- Ara Hakobyan
- Aram Hakobyan
- Felix Hakobyan
- Florin Halagian
- Hovhannes Hambardzumyan
- Varazdat Haroyan
- Ararat Harutyunyan
- Harutyun Hovhannisyan
- Kamo Hovhannisyan
- Khoren Hovhannisyan
- Sargis Hovhannisyan
- Zhora Hovhannisyan
- Sargis Hovsepyan

== K ==
- Eduard Kakosyan
- Manuk Kakosyan
- Khoren Kalashyan
- Artashes Kalaydzhan
- Arman Karamyan
- Artavazd Karamyan
- Aleksandr Karapetyan
- Harut Karapetyan
- Sargis Karapetyan (kelahiran 1990)
- Gevorg Kasparov
- Vahram Kevorkian
- Ashot Khachatryan
- Romik Khachatryan
- Vardan Khachatryan
- Artem Khachaturov
- Andrey Khachaturyan
- Felix Khojoyan
- Barsegh Kirakosyan
- Yervand Krbachyan

== M ==
- Edgar Malakyan
- David Manoyan
- Edgar Manucharyan
- Eduard Markarov
- Robert Markosi
- Grigor Meliksetyan
- Yegishe Melikyan
- Samvel Melkonyan
- Karapet Mikaelyan
- Arthur H. Minasyan
- Arthur S. Minasyan
- Vahagn Minasyan
- Vardan Minasyan
- Alexander Mirzoyan
- Hamlet Mkhitaryan
- Henrik Mkhitaryan
- Hrayr Mkoyan
- Aghvan Mkrtchyan
- Arthur Mkrtchyan
- Karlen Mkrtchyan
- Andrey Movsisyan
- Yura Movsisyan

== N ==
- Rafael Nazaryan
- Ara Nigoyan

== O ==
- Aras Ozbiliz
- Stepan Oganesyan

== P ==
- Levon Pachajyan
- Arsen Papikyan
- Eduard Partsikyan
- Armenak Petrosyan
- Arthur Petrosyan
- Galust Petrosyan
- Nazar Petrosyan
- Tigran Petrosyan

== S ==
- Norayr Sahakyan
- Eduard Sarkisov
- Albert Sarkisyan
- Armen Shahgeldyan
- Gagik Simonyan
- Nikita Simonyan
- Eduard Spertsyan
- Arthur Stepanyan
- Kalin Stepanyan
- Levon Stepanyan
- Varuzhan Sukiasyan
- Yervand Sukiasyan

== T ==
- Alexander Tadevosyan
- Vahe Tadevosyan
- Hovhannes Tahmazyan
- Frédéric Tatarian
- Andranik Teymourian
- Serjik Teymourian
- Armen Tigranyan

== V ==
- Harutyun Vardanyan
- Eduard Veranyan
- Aram Voskanyan
- Arthur Voskanyan
- Taron Voskanyan

== Y ==
- Hiraç Yagan
- Yeghia Yavruyan
- Artak Yedigaryan
- Arthur Yedigaryan
- Aramais Yepiskoposyan
- Tigran Yesayan
- David Yurchenko
- Arthur Yuspashyan

== Z ==
- Oganes Zanazanyan
- Robert Zebelyan
- Lucas Zelarayán
