= FC Gandzasar Kapan in European football =

Overview of FC Gandzasar Kapan's role in European football

Gandzasar Kapan in European football
- Club: Gandzasar Kapan
- Most appearances: Armen Tatintsyan (7)
- Top scorer: Hayrapet Avagyan (2)
- First entry: 2009–10 UEFA Europa League
- Latest entry: 2018–19 UEFA Europa League

Gandzasar Kapan is an Armenian football club based in Kapan, Armenia.

== History ==
In 2009, Gandzasar Kapan made their European debut against NAC Breda in the UEFA Europa League.

=== Matches ===
As of match played 19 July 2018

Season	Competition	Round	Opponent	Home	Away	Aggregate
2009–10	UEFA Europa League	2QR	(Netherlands) NAC Breda	0–2	0–6	0–8
2012–13	UEFA Europa League	1QR	(Faroe Islands) EB/Streymur	2–0	1–3	3–3
2012–13	UEFA Europa League	2QR	(Switzerland) Servette	1–3	0–2	1–5
2013–14	UEFA Europa League	1QR	(Kazakhstan) Aktobe	1–2	1–2	2–4
2017–18	UEFA Europa League	1QR	(Montenegro) Mladost Podgorica	0–3	0–1	0–4
2018–19	UEFA Europa League	1QR	(Poland) Lech Poznań	2–1	0–2	2–3

== Player statistics ==
=== Appearances ===
As of match played 19 July 2018

	Name	Years	UEFA Europa League	Total	Ratio
1	(Armenia) Armen Tatintsyan	2006-2015	7 (0)	7 (0)	0
2	(Armenia) Ara Khachatryan	2008-2018	6 (0)	6 (0)	0
2	(Serbia) Goran Obradović	2011-2014	6 (0)	6 (0)	0
2	(Armenia) Arthur Avagyan	2007, 2012-2016	6 (0)	6 (0)	0
2	(Bosnia and Herzegovina) Dejan Vukomanović	2012-2014	6 (0)	6 (0)	0
6	(Armenia) Hayrapet Avagyan	2009-2015	5 (2)	5 (2)	0.4
6	(Armenia) Arsen Beglaryan	2012-2014	5 (0)	5 (0)	0
8	(Armenia) Vaspurak Minasyan	2016-2021	2 (0)	2 (0)	0
8	(Brazil) Gustavo Correia	2011-2012	4 (1)	4 (1)	0.25
8	(Uganda) Noah Babadi Kasule	2011-2013	4 (0)	4 (0)	0
8	(Brazil) Dhiego Lomba	2012-2013	4 (1)	4 (1)	0.25
8	(Mali) Yamadou Keita	2011-2013	4 (0)	4 (0)	0
8	(Netherlands) Regilio Seedorf	2012	4 (0)	4 (0)	0
8	(Armenia) Sargis Nasibyan	2011-2013	4 (0)	4 (0)	0
8	(Armenia) Hayk Ishkhanyan	2015-2018, 2020	4 (0)	4 (0)	0
8	(Haiti) Alex Junior Christian	2017-2019	4 (0)	4 (0)	0
8	(Armenia) Wbeymar Angulo	2015-2020	4 (0)	4 (0)	0
8	(Armenia) Artur Yuspashyan	2017-2018	4 (0)	4 (0)	0
8	(Zambia) Lubambo Musonda	2015-2019	4 (1)	4 (1)	0.25
21	(Armenia) Grigor Meliksetyan	2014, 2015-2016, 2017-2020	3 (0)	3 (0)	0
21	(Armenia) Beniamin Manucharyan	2006-2014	3 (0)	3 (0)	0
21	(Armenia) Gegham Harutyunyan	2014-2021	3 (1)	3 (1)	0.33
24	(Georgia (country)) Levan Bubuteishvili	2007-2011	2 (0)	2 (0)	0
24	(Georgia (country)) David Khanishvili	2008-2011	2 (0)	2 (0)	0
24	(Armenia) Valeri Aleksanyan	2007-2010	2 (0)	2 (0)	0
24	(Armenia) Mikheil Simonyan	2009	2 (0)	2 (0)	0
24	(Armenia) Karen Zakaryan	2007-2011, 2012	2 (0)	2 (0)	0
24	(Romania) Virgin Marshavela	2011	2 (0)	2 (0)	0
24	(Armenia) Artaches Antonyan	2009-2010	2 (0)	2 (0)	0
24	(Armenia) Arsen Avetisyan	2008-2011	2 (0)	2 (0)	0
24	(Armenia) Vahe Davtyan	2007-2011	2 (0)	2 (0)	0
24	(Georgia (country)) Zaza Sakhokia	2009	2 (0)	2 (0)	0
24	(Armenia) Aghvan Hayrapetyan	2009, 2012	2 (0)	2 (0)	0
24	(Georgia (country)) Giorgi Krasovski	2012	2 (0)	2 (0)	0
24	(Ivory Coast) Diakardia Doumbia	2012-2013	2 (0)	2 (0)	0
24	(Armenia) Andranik Sargsyan	2006-2007, 2009-2012	2 (0)	2 (0)	0
24	(Armenia) Artak Dashyan	2013-2014	2 (1)	2 (1)	0.5
24	(Armenia) Artak Grigoryan	2013-2015	2 (0)	2 (0)	0
24	(Armenia) Samvel Melkonyan	2013-2015	2 (0)	2 (0)	0
24	(Armenia) Artur Barseghyan	2013, 2015	2 (0)	2 (0)	0
24	(Georgia (country)) Shota Jikia	2013-2014	2 (0)	2 (0)	0
24	(Armenia) Narek Beglaryan	2013-2014	2 (1)	2 (1)	0.5
24	(Armenia) Aleksandr Petrosyan	2008-2009, 2013-2017	2 (0)	2 (0)	0
24	(Serbia) Damir Memović	2015-2018	2 (0)	2 (0)	0
24	(Germany) Christopher Mandiangu	2017	2 (0)	2 (0)	0
24	(Brazil) Walmerson	2016-2017	2 (0)	2 (0)	0
24	(Brazil) Claudir	2016-2017	2 (0)	2 (0)	0
24	(Armenia) Sargis Shahinyan	2017-2018, 2024–Present	2 (0)	2 (0)	0
24	(Armenia) Vardan Bakalyan	2016-2017	2 (0)	2 (0)	0
24	(Belarus) Aleksandr Sverchinskiy	2018	2 (0)	2 (0)	0
24	(Serbia) Vukašin Tomić	2018	2 (0)	2 (0)	0
24	(Armenia) Gevorg Nranyan	2017-2021	2 (0)	2 (0)	0
24	(Armenia) Gevorg Ohanyan	2016, 2018-2019	2 (0)	2 (0)	0
24	(Armenia) Vardan Pogosyan	2018, 2019-2020	2 (0)	2 (0)	0
56	(Brazil) Leandro Teófilo	2009-2010	1 (0)	1 (0)	0
56	(Armenia) Armen Khachatryan	2012	1 (0)	1 (0)	0
56	(Armenia) Vruyr Grigoryan	2012-2016	1 (0)	1 (0)	0
56	(Armenia) Artashes Zakaryan	2010-2015	1 (0)	1 (0)	0
56	(Armenia) Ashot Karapetyan	2016-2019	1 (0)	1 (0)	0
56	(Armenia) Gevorg Kasparov	2017-2020	1 (0)	1 (0)	0
56	(Armenia) Davit Minasyan	2018-2021	1 (0)	1 (0)	0

=== Goalscorers ===
As of match played 19 July 2018

	Name	Years	UEFA Europa League	Total	Ratio
1	(Armenia) Hayrapet Avagyan	2009-2015	2 (5)	2 (5)	0.4
2	(Brazil) Gustavo Correia	2011-2012	1 (4)	1 (4)	0.25
2	(Brazil) Dhiego Lomba	2012-2013	1 (4)	1 (4)	0.25
2	(Armenia) Artak Dashyan	2013-2014	1 (2)	1 (2)	0.5
2	(Armenia) Narek Beglaryan	2013-2014	1 (2)	1 (2)	0.5
2	(Zambia) Lubambo Musonda	2015-2019	1 (4)	1 (4)	0.25
2	(Armenia) Gegham Harutyunyan	2014-2021	1 (3)	1 (3)	0.33

=== Clean sheets ===
As of match played 19 July 2018

	Name	Years	UEFA Europa League	Total	Ratio
1	(Armenia) Arsen Beglaryan	2012-2014	1 (5)	1 (5)	0.2
2	(Georgia (country)) Levan Bubuteishvili	2007-2011	0 (2)	0 (2)	0
2	(Armenia) Armen Khachatryan	2012	0 (1)	0 (1)	0
2	(Armenia) Grigor Meliksetyan	2014, 2015-2016, 2017-2020	0 (3)	0 (3)	0
2	(Armenia) Gevorg Kasparov	2017-2020	0 (1)	0 (1)	0

== Overall record ==
=== By competition ===
As of match played 19 July 2018

Competition	GP	W	D	L	GF	GA	+/-
UEFA Europa League	12	2	0	10	8	27	-19
Total	12	2	0	10	8	27	−19

=== By country ===
As of match played 19 July 2018

Country	Pld	W	D	L	GF	GA	GD	Win%
Faroe Islands	2	1	0	1	3	3	+0	50.00
Kazakhstan	2	0	0	2	2	4	−2	0.00
Montenegro	2	0	0	2	0	4	−4	0.00
Netherlands	2	0	0	2	0	8	−8	0.00
Poland	2	1	0	1	2	3	−1	50.00
Switzerland	2	0	0	2	1	5	−4	0.00

=== By club ===
As of match played 19 July 2018

Country	Pld	W	D	L	GF	GA	GD	Win%
(Faroe Islands) EB/Streymur	2	1	0	1	3	3	+0	50.00
(Kazakhstan) Aktobe	2	0	0	2	2	4	−2	0.00
(Montenegro) Mladost Podgorica	2	0	0	2	0	4	−4	0.00
(Netherlands) NAC Breda	2	0	0	2	0	8	−8	0.00
(Poland) Lech Poznań	2	1	0	1	2	3	−1	50.00
(Switzerland) Servette	2	0	0	2	1	5	−4	0.00
