= Malkov =

Malkov (masculine, Russian: Малков) or Malkova (feminine, Russian: Малкова) is a Russian surname. Notable people with the surname include:

- Anatoli Malkov (born 1981), Russian soccer player
- Igor Malkov (born 1965), Russian speedskater
- Konstantin Malkov, American mathematician and businessman
- Mia Malkova (born 1992), American pornographic actress and livestreamer
- Vladimir Malkov (disambiguation), multiple people
- Yevgeni Malkov (born 1988), Russian soccer player

== See also ==
- Málkov (disambiguation)
