= 1985 Soviet First League =

Soviet First League
- Season: 1985

The 1985 Soviet First League (Russian: Чемпионат СССР 1985 года в первой лиге, Chempionat SSSR 1985 goda v pervoi lige) was a fifteenth season of the Soviet First League.

== First stage ==
=== Group West ===
Pos	Team	Pld	W	D	L	GF	GA	GD	Pts	Qualification
1	(Latvian Soviet Socialist Republic) Daugava Riga	20	12	5	3	34	12	+22	29	Qualification for Group A
2	(Ukrainian Soviet Socialist Republic) SKA Karpaty Lviv	20	8	7	5	25	18	+7	23	Qualification for Group A
3	(Armenian Soviet Socialist Republic) Kotayk Abovyan	20	10	2	8	28	24	+4	22	Qualification for Group A
4	(Ukrainian Soviet Socialist Republic) Kolos Nikopol	20	9	3	8	26	25	+1	21	Qualification for Group A
5	(Russian Soviet Federative Socialist Republic) Dynamo Stavropol	20	9	3	8	15	17	−2	21	Qualification for Group A
6	(Georgian Soviet Socialist Republic) Dinamo Batumi	20	9	3	8	28	27	+1	21	Qualification for Group A
7	(Ukrainian Soviet Socialist Republic) Metalurh Zaporizhzhia	20	7	5	8	17	25	−8	19	Qualification for Group B
8	(Russian Soviet Federative Socialist Republic) Spartak Ordjonikidze	20	8	2	10	24	24	0	18	Qualification for Group B
9	(Georgian Soviet Socialist Republic) Guria Lanchkhuti	20	7	3	10	20	26	−6	17	Qualification for Group B
10	(Russian Soviet Federative Socialist Republic) Kuban Krasnodar	20	7	2	11	26	26	0	16	Qualification for Group B
11	(Moldavian Soviet Socialist Republic) Nistru Kishinev	20	5	3	12	16	35	−19	13	Qualification for Group B

=== Group East ===
Pos	Team	Pld	W	D	L	GF	GA	GD	Pts	Qualification
1	(Russian Soviet Federative Socialist Republic) Shinnik Yaroslavl	20	9	8	3	25	21	+4	26	Qualification for Group A
2	(Tajik Soviet Socialist Republic) Pamir Dushanbe	20	9	7	4	28	15	+13	25	Qualification for Group A
3	(Russian Soviet Federative Socialist Republic) CSKA Moscow	20	9	7	4	36	20	+16	25	Qualification for Group A
4	(Russian Soviet Federative Socialist Republic) Rotor Volgograd	20	8	8	4	34	21	+13	24	Qualification for Group A
5	(Russian Soviet Federative Socialist Republic) SKA Khabarovsk	20	10	3	7	33	32	+1	23	Qualification for Group A
6	(Russian Soviet Federative Socialist Republic) Lokomotiv Moscow	20	7	6	7	18	27	−9	20	Qualification for Group A
7	(Uzbek Soviet Socialist Republic) Pakhtakor Tashkent	20	6	8	6	24	23	+1	20	Qualification for Group B
8	(Russian Soviet Federative Socialist Republic) Kuzbass Kemerevo	20	8	3	9	27	24	+3	19	Qualification for Group B
9	(Russian Soviet Federative Socialist Republic) Krylya Sovetov Kuybyshev	20	5	9	6	16	19	−3	19	Qualification for Group B
10	(Uzbek Soviet Socialist Republic) Zvezda Dzhizak	20	3	6	11	20	38	−18	12	Qualification for Group B
11	(Russian Soviet Federative Socialist Republic) Iskra Smolensk	20	1	5	14	7	28	−21	7	Qualification for Group B

== Second stage ==
=== Group A ===
Pos	Team	Pld	W	D	L	GF	GA	GD	Pts	Qualification
1	(Latvian Soviet Socialist Republic) Daugava Riga	42	24	12	6	78	35	+43	60	Qualification for Promotion play-off
2	(Russian Soviet Federative Socialist Republic) CSKA Moscow	42	21	14	7	81	37	+44	54 (Note: There was a draw limit of no more than 12. Only twelve draws earn a point, in contrast, over the limit draws earn no points.)	Qualification for Promotion play-off
3	(Ukrainian Soviet Socialist Republic) SKA Karpaty Lviv	42	21	13	8	66	44	+22	54	
4	(Tajik Soviet Socialist Republic) Pamir Dushanbe	42	21	10	11	59	41	+18	52	
5	(Ukrainian Soviet Socialist Republic) Kolos Nikopol	42	20	6	16	52	55	−3	46	
6	(Russian Soviet Federative Socialist Republic) Lokomotiv Moscow	42	16	11	15	52	51	+1	43	
7	(Russian Soviet Federative Socialist Republic) Shinnik Yaroslavl	42	15	14	13	51	53	−2	42	
8	(Russian Soviet Federative Socialist Republic) Rotor Volgograd	42	15	12	15	61	56	+5	42	
9	(Russian Soviet Federative Socialist Republic) SKA Khabarovsk	42	16	9	17	56	68	−12	41	
10	(Armenian Soviet Socialist Republic) Kotayk Abovyan	42	16	5	21	54	65	−11	37	
11	(Georgian Soviet Socialist Republic) Dinamo Batumi	42	13	9	20	56	71	−15	35	
12	(Russian Soviet Federative Socialist Republic) Dynamo Stavropol	42	13	7	22	35	54	−19	33	

=== Group B ===
Pos	Team	Pld	W	D	L	GF	GA	GD	Pts	Relegation
13	(Ukrainian Soviet Socialist Republic) Metalurh Zaporizhzhia	38	16	8	14	49	52	−3	40	
14	(Uzbek Soviet Socialist Republic) Pakhtakor Tashkent	38	14	13	11	48	38	+10	40 (Note: There was a draw limit of no more than 12. Only twelve draws earn a point, in contrast, over the limit draws earn no points.)	
15	(Russian Soviet Federative Socialist Republic) Kuzbass Kemerevo	38	17	5	16	62	52	+10	39	
16	(Russian Soviet Federative Socialist Republic) Spartak Ordjonikidze	38	17	4	17	49	52	−3	38	
17	(Georgian Soviet Socialist Republic) Guria Lanchkhuti	38	15	7	16	50	52	−2	37	
18	(Russian Soviet Federative Socialist Republic) Kuban Krasnodar	38	13	8	17	51	50	+1	34	
19	(Moldavian Soviet Socialist Republic) Nistru Kishinev	38	12	8	18	38	54	−16	32	
20	(Russian Soviet Federative Socialist Republic) Krylya Sovetov Kuybyshev (R)	38	10	13	15	36	42	−6	32	Qualification for Relegation play-off
21	(Russian Soviet Federative Socialist Republic) Iskra Smolensk (O)	38	8	8	22	27	48	−21	24	Qualification for Relegation play-off
22	(Uzbek Soviet Socialist Republic) Zvezda Dzhizak (R)	38	7	8	23	37	78	−41	22	Qualification for Relegation play-off

(O) Play-off winners; (R) Relegated

== Transitional tournaments ==
=== Higher League Promotion ===
Promotion tournament took place in Moscow on 27 November — 15 December 1985.

Pos	Team	Pld	W	D	L	GF	GA	GD	Pts	CHE	NEF	CSK	DAU
1	(Ukrainian Soviet Socialist Republic) Chornomorets Odesa	6	3	3	0	6	3	+3	9		0–0	2–1	1–0
2	(Azerbaijan Soviet Socialist Republic) Neftchi Baku	6	2	3	1	9	4	+5	7	1–1		1–1	3–0
3	(Russian Soviet Federative Socialist Republic) CSKA Moscow	6	1	3	2	7	7	0	5	1–1	2–0		0–1
4	(Latvian Soviet Socialist Republic) Daugava Riga	6	1	1	4	3	11	−8	3	0–1	0–4	2–2	

=== Second League Relegation ===
==== Group A ====
Pos	Team	Pld	W	D	L	GF	GA	GD	Pts	ROS	TAV	ZVZ	SOX
1	(Russian Soviet Federative Socialist Republic) Rostselmash Rostov-on-Don (P)	6	5	0	1	14	4	+10	10		1–0	5–0	2–0
2	(Ukrainian Soviet Socialist Republic) Tavriya Simferopol	6	3	1	2	11	7	+4	7	2–1		4–1	4–2
3	(Uzbek Soviet Socialist Republic) Zvezda Dzhizak (R)	6	3	0	3	8	15	−7	6	1–3	2–1		3–2
4	(Uzbek Soviet Socialist Republic) Soxibkor Khalkabad	6	0	1	5	5	12	−7	1	1–2	0–0	0–1	

(P) Promoted; (R) Relegated

==== Group B ====
Pos	Team	Pld	W	D	L	GF	GA	GD	Pts	ATL	ZVZ	MER	KRY
1	(Lithuanian Soviet Socialist Republic) Atlantas Klaipeda (P)	6	4	1	1	9	6	+3	9		2–1	3–1	2–1
2	(Russian Soviet Federative Socialist Republic) Zvezda Perm	6	3	1	2	8	5	+3	7	2–0		3–0	1–0
3	(Georgian Soviet Socialist Republic) Mertskhali Makharadze	6	2	2	2	7	9	−2	6	1–1	2–0		2–2
4	(Russian Soviet Federative Socialist Republic) Krylya Sovetov Kuibyshev (R)	6	0	2	4	4	8	−4	2	0–1	1–1	0–1	

(P) Promoted; (R) Relegated

==== Group V ====
Pos	Team	Pld	W	D	L	GF	GA	GD	Pts	ISK	MEL	GEO	DYN
1	(Russian Soviet Federative Socialist Republic) Iskra Smolensk	6	5	1	0	10	2	+8	11		2–0	2–1	2–0
2	(Kazakh Soviet Socialist Republic) Meliorator Chimkent	6	3	1	2	12	8	+4	7	0–1		2–0	5–1
3	(Russian Soviet Federative Socialist Republic) Geolog Tyumen	6	1	2	3	8	10	−2	4	0–0	1–2		4–2
4	(Russian Soviet Federative Socialist Republic) Dynamo Bryansk	6	0	2	4	9	19	−10	2	1–3	3–3	2–2	

== Top scorers ==
#	Player	Club	Goals
1	Valeri Shmarov	CSKA Moscow	29 (1)
2	Aleksandrs Starkovs	Daugava Riga	25
3	Avtandil Gorgiladze	Dinamo Batumi	23 (4)
3	Jevgeņijs Miļevskis	Daugava Riga	23 (4)
5	Aleksandr Nikitin	Rotor Volgograd	22
6	Sergei Berezin	SKA Khabarovsk	19 (1)
7	Heorhiy Kolyadyuk	Metalurh Zaporizhzhia	18
8	Viktor Rafalchuk	SKA Karpaty Lviv	16 (6)
9	Eduard Veranyan	FC Kotayk	15 (1)
9	Vitaly Razdayev	Kuzbass Kemerevo	15 (3)

== Number of teams by union republic ==
Rank	Union republic	Number of teams	Club(s)
1	RSFSR	11	CSKA Moscow, Lokomotiv Moscow, Shinnik Yaroslavl, Rotor Volgograd, SKA Khabarovsk, Dinamo Stavropol, Kuzbass Kemerovo, Spartak Ordzhonikidze, Kuban Krasnodar, Krylia Sovetov Kuibyshev, Iskra Smolensk
2	Ukrainian SSR	3	SKA Karpaty Lviv, Kolos Nikopol, Metalurh Zaporizhzhia
3	Georgian SSR	2	Guria Lanchkhuti, Dinamo Batumi
3	Uzbek SSR	2	Pakhtakor Tashkent, Zvezda Dzhizak
5	Latvian SSR	1	Daugava Riga
5	Tajik SSR	1	Pamir Dushanbe
5	Armenian SSR	1	Kotaik Abovian
5	Moldavian SSR	1	Nistru Kishinev
5	Lithuanian SSR	1	Atlantas Klapeida

== See also ==
- Soviet First League
