= Khoren Kalashyan =

Armenian footballer

Khoren Kalashyan (Armenian: Խորեն Քալաշյան; born 16 October 1984 in Yerevan, Armenia) is an ex-amateur Armenian football player who became a football scout. He is representing and scouting numbers of footballers for clubs and agents. The main partners of Khoren Kalashyan are Football Agency Carpe Diem in Russia, Sport+Concept in Germany, United Lions in UK, scouts and sports lawyers in Belgium, Portugal, Italy and Armenia. He was the Chairman of Ulisses FC before it went bust.

== Career ==
Kalashyan started his work in the football world in August 2011. The first players he scouted and represented to agents for negotiation were: Hrayr Mkoyan, who moved from FC Mika to Spartak Nalchik; Goran Jerković, who moved from FK Tauras Tauragė to Esteghlal; and Arsen Beglaryan, who moved from FC Krasnodar to Gandzasar F.C. Kalashyan also helped Armenian players Edgar Malakyan from FC Pyunik and Norayr Sahakyan from Ulisses F.C. to get tryouts in clubs Spartak Nalchik and FC Shakhter. During this short period Kalashyan made his own football network which is covering following countries: UK, Germany, Italy, Belgium, Russia, Ukraine, Lebanon, Iran and Armenia.

=== 2012/2013 Summer Transfers ===
Brought to Gandzasar F.C. for a trial Dutch attacking midfielder Regilio Seedorf, who is the nephew of the famous player of A.C. Milan and Netherlands national football team Clarence Seedorf. The last club Dutch player was the Lithuanian FK Tauras Tauragė, whose contract had expired in November 2011. On 18 June brought French attacking midfielder Nabil Guelsifi for a trial in Ulisses F.C.
