= Khoren =

Khoren (Armenian: Խորեն) is an Armenian given name. Notable people with the name include:

- Khoren Abrahamyan (1930–2004), Armenian actor and director
- Khoren Bayramyan (born 1992), Russian professional football player of Armenian descent
- Khoren Kalashyan (born 1984), Armenian football agent
- Khoren Gevor (born 1980), Armenian-German professional boxer
- Khoren I Paroian (1914–1983), the Catholicos of the Holy See of Cilicia, from 1963 to 1983
- Khoren I of Armenia (1873–1938), the Catholicos of the Armenian Apostolic Church from 1932 to 1938
- Khoren Hovhannisyan (born 1955), former Armenian and Soviet football midfielder, member of the USSR national football team
- Khoren Levonyan (born 1983), Armenian presenter and actor
- Khoren Sargsian (1891–1970), Armenian writer, critic, doctor of philology, and professor

== See also ==
- Moses of Chorene or Moses of Khoren, also known as Movses Khorenatsi (ca. 410 – 490s AD), Armenian historian and author of The History of Armenia
- Khoren and Shooshanig Avedisian School, private school in Yerevan, Armenia
- Korean (disambiguation)
- Koreng
- Kühren
