= 2013–14 Armenian First League =

Football league season

The 2013–14 Armenian First League season began on 21 July 2013 and finished on 15 June 2014.

== League table ==
Pos	Team	Pld	W	D	L	GF	GA	GD	Pts
1	Banants-2 (C)	32	19	8	5	68	37	+31	65
2	Alashkert-2	32	17	7	8	63	38	+25	58
3	Ararat-2	32	17	6	9	72	47	+25	57
4	Pyunik-2	32	15	6	11	58	45	+13	51
5	Gandzasar-2	32	13	7	12	57	51	+6	46
6	Shengavit	32	9	9	14	47	59	−12	36
7	Mika-2	32	9	5	18	35	63	−28	32
8	Shirak-2	32	8	7	17	43	75	−32	31
9	Banants-3	32	8	3	21	63	91	−28	27

Source: Soccerway
Rules for classification: 1) points; 2) goal difference; 3) number of goals scored.
(C) Champions

== See also ==
- 2013–14 Armenian Premier League
- 2013–14 Armenian Cup
