= 2012–13 Armenian First League =

Football league season

The 2012–13 Armenian First League season began on 10 April 2012 and finished on 13 May 2013.

== Overview ==
- Alashkert FC returned to professional football.
- King Delux joined the league.

== League table ==
Pos	Team	Pld	W	D	L	GF	GA	GD	Pts	Promotion
1	Alashkert (C)	36	24	6	6	80	31	+49	78	Promotion to 2013–14 Armenian Premier League
2	Mika-2	36	18	7	11	60	51	+9	61	
3	Pyunik-2	36	18	7	11	69	53	+16	61	
4	Gandzasar-2	36	18	6	12	76	59	+17	60	
5	Ararat-2	36	16	9	11	60	51	+9	57	
6	Banants-2	36	17	3	16	57	47	+10	54	
7	Shengavit	36	14	4	18	46	57	−11	46	
8	Shirak-2	36	11	8	17	48	55	−7	41	
9	King Delux	36	10	3	23	45	78	−33	33	Team disbanded during the season (Note: King Delux withdrew their participation during the season because of financial problems. Their matches up to the 21st round were expunged from the record.)
10	Impulse-2	36	5	5	26	46	105	−59	20	

Source: Soccerway
Rules for classification: 1) points; 2) goal difference; 3) number of goals scored.
(C) Champions

== See also ==
- 2012–13 Armenian Premier League
- 2012–13 Armenian Cup
