= 2013–14 Armenian Cup =

Tournament details
- Country: Armenia
- Teams: 8

Final positions
- Champions: Pyunik
- Runners-up: Gandzasar

Tournament statistics
- Matches played: 13
- Goals scored: 28 (2.15 per match)

The 2013–14 Armenian Cup is the 23rd season of Armenia's football knockout competition. It featured the eight 2013–14 Premier League teams, but no team from the 2013–14 First Division. The tournament began on 18 September 2013, with Pyunik the defending champions, having won their fifth title the previous season.

== Results ==
=== Quarter-finals ===
All eight Premier League clubs competed in this round. The first legs were played on 18 September and 2 October 2013, while the second legs were played on 23 October and 6 November 2013.

Team 1	Agg.	Team 2	1st leg	2nd leg
Gandzasar	3−1	Ulisses	0−0	3−1
Alashkert	1−3	Mika	1−0	0−3
Shirak	2−2 (a)	Banants	1−2	1−0
Pyunik	3−2	Ararat Yerevan	1−1	2−1

=== Semi-finals ===
The four winners from the quarterfinals entered this round. The first legs were played on 18 and 19 March 2014, with the second legs completed on 15 and 16 April 2014.

Team 1	Agg.	Team 2	1st leg	2nd leg
Gandzasar	3−2	Banants	2−1	1−1
Mika	0−3	Pyunik	0–1	0–2

=== Final ===
7 May 2014
19:00

Pyunik	2–1	Gandzasar
K. Hovhannisyan 45+5'; Baloyan 60'	Report	N. Beglaryan 63'

Hrazdan Stadium, Yerevan
Attendance: 5,000
Referee: Suren Baliyan
