= Vladimir Malkov =

Vladimir Malkov may refer to:

- Vladimir Malkov (badminton) (born 1986), Russian badminton player
- Vladimir Malkov (footballer) (born 1980), Russian football player
