= Miloš Stamenković =

Serbian footballer

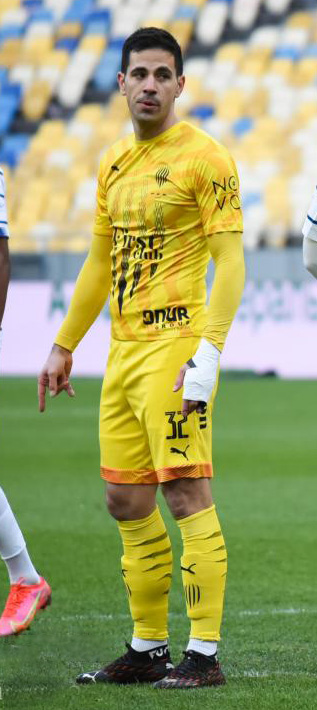
- Miloš Stamenković playing for Rukh Lviv in 2021

Personal information
- Date of birth: 1 June 1990 (age 36)
- Place of birth: Belgrade, SFR Yugoslavia
- Height: 1.94 m (6 ft 4 in)
- Position: Defender

Youth career
- 1997–2000: Zemun
- 2000–2005: Red Star Belgrade
- 2005–2009: Radnički Beograd

Senior career*
Years	Team	Apps	(Gls)
2009–2011	Proleter Novi Sad	26	(1)
2011	OFK Mladenovac	9	(1)
2012–2013	BSK Borča	24	(1)
2013–2014	Ararat Yerevan	24	(1)
2014–2016	Shirak	42	(3)
2016–2017	Stal Kamianske	31	(0)
2017–2018	Irtysh Pavlodar	39	(4)
2019	Saint Gilloise	6	(2)
2019–2020	Irtysh Pavlodar	18	(1)
2020–2021	Rukh Lviv	20	(0)
2022	Akzhayik	12	(0)
2022–2023	Ararat-Armenia	4	(0)
2023	Kuban Krasnodar	5	(0)
Total		260	(14)
- * Club domestic league appearances and goals as of 3 June 2023

Miloš Stamenković (Serbian Cyrillic: Милош Стаменковић; born 1 June 1990) is a Serbian professional footballer who plays as a defender.

== Career ==
Stamenković is a product of FK Zemun and Red Star Belgrade youth sportive schools.

On 26 June 2017, Stamenković signed a one-year contract with Irtysh Pavlodar of the Kazakhstan Premier League.

On 25 June 2019, Stamenković returned to Irtysh Pavlodar on a contract until the end of the season, signing a new contract with Irtysh on 21 November 2019.

On 14 July 2022, Ararat-Armenia announced the signing of Stamenković. On 4 March 2023, Stamenković left Ararat-Armenia having played five times for the club.

== Career statistics ==
=== Club ===
As of match played 26 November 2022

Appearances and goals by club, season and competition
Club	Season	League			National cup		Continental		Other		Total	
Club	Season	Division	Apps	Goals	Apps	Goals	Apps	Goals	Apps	Goals	Apps	Goals
Ararat Yerevan	2013–14	Armenian Premier League	24	1	2	0	–		–		26	1
Shirak	2014–15	Armenian Premier League	24	3	1	0	–		–		25	3
Shirak	2015–16	Armenian Premier League	18	0	1	0	4	0	–		23	0
Shirak	Total		42	3	2	0	4	0	0	0	48	3
Stal Kamianske	2016–17	Ukrainian Premier League	31	0	2	0	–		–		33	0
Irtysh Pavlodar	2017	Kazakhstan Premier League	13	1	0	0	3	0	–		16	1
Irtysh Pavlodar	2018	Kazakhstan Premier League	26	3	2	0	2	0	1	1	31	4
Irtysh Pavlodar	Total		39	4	2	0	5	0	1	1	47	5
Union Saint-Gilloise	2018–19	Belgian First Division B	2	0	0	0	–		4	2	6	2
Irtysh Pavlodar	2019	Kazakhstan Premier League	16	1	0	0	–		–		16	1
Irtysh Pavlodar	2018	Kazakhstan Premier League	2	0	0	0	–		–		2	0
Irtysh Pavlodar	Total		18	1	0	0	0	0	0	0	18	1
Rukh Lviv	2020–21	Ukrainian Premier League	16	0	1	0	–		–		17	0
Rukh Lviv	2021–22	Ukrainian Premier League	4	0	2	0	–		–		6	0
Rukh Lviv	Total		20	0	3	0	0	0	0	0	23	0
Akzhayik	2022	Kazakhstan Premier League	12	0	0	0	–		–		12	0
Ararat-Armenia	2022–23	Armenian Premier League	4	0	1	0	0	0	–		5	0
Career total			192	9	12	0	9	0	5	3	218	12
