= Albert Sarkisyan (footballer, born 1963) =

Armenian footballer

Personal information
- Date of birth: 14 August 1963 (age 63)
- Place of birth: Yerevan, Armenian SSR
- Height: 1.87 m (6 ft 1 1/2 in)
- Position: Defender

Senior career*
Years	Team	Apps	(Gls)
1980–1988	FC Ararat Yerevan	147	(11)
1989	FC Dynamo Kyiv	3	(0)
1990	FC Ararat Yerevan	14	(2)
1990	FC Kapan	2	(0)
1991–1993	FC Ararat Yerevan	65	(14)
1993–1994	FK Panerys Vilnius	5	(0)
1995–1996	Lokomotyvas Vilnius		

Managerial career
- 1996: Lokomotyvas Vilnius
- 1997–1999: Dvin Artashat
- 2002: Kilikia
- 2003–2004: Dinamo-2000
- 2004–2005: Yerevan United
- ?–2007: Gandzasar
- 2010: Gandzasar
- 2012–2013: Alashkert
- 2014–: Alashkert-2
- * Club domestic league appearances and goals

Albert Sarkisyan (Armenian: Ալբերտ Սարգսյան; born 14 August 1963, in Yerevan) is an Armenian professional football manager and a former player.

== Career ==
Sarkisyan made 187 appearances in the Soviet Top League for FC Ararat Yerevan and FC Dynamo Kyiv.

He is currently managing Alashkert-2 who play at the Armenian First League as the reserve team of Alashkert FC.

== Honours ==
- Soviet Top League bronze: 1989.
