= Samvel Petrosyan =

Soviet footballer and Armenian manager (born 1954)

Personal information
- Full name: Samvel Petrosyan
- Date of birth: 27 September 1954 (age 72)
- Place of birth: Yerevan, Armenian SSR, Soviet Union
- Height: 1.84 m (6 ft 0 in)
- Position: Striker

Senior career*
Years	Team	Apps	(Gls)
1973–1983	Ararat Yerevan	183	(78)
1985	FC Kotayk Abovian	19	(12)

Managerial career
- 1986–1987: FC Kotayk (assistant)
- 1988–1989: Ararat Yerevan (assistant)
- 1990: Araks Hoktemberian
- 1991: FC Kotayk (assistant)
- 1991: Kotayk Abobyan
- 1992: Kilikia Yerevan
- 1993: FC Kotayk
- 1995–1996: FC Kotayk
- 1996–1997: FC Yerevan
- 1997: FC Kotayk
- 1998–1999: Kilikia Yerevan
- 2000: FC Araks Ararat
- 2001: FC Kotayk
- 2001: FC Mika
- 2002–2003: FC Pyunik (assistant)
- 2006–2007: FC Pyunik
- 2007–2009: FC Gandzasar Kapan
- 2010–2011: FC Shirak
- 2015–2016: Gandzasar Kapan (sports director)
- 2016–: FC Kotayk (sports director)
- * Club domestic league appearances and goals

Samvel Petrosyan (Armenian: Սամվել Պետրոսյան, Russian: Самвел Александрович Петросян; born on 27 September 1954) in Yerevan, is a former Soviet football striker. Now is manager who has worked as the coach of several Armenian teams among which FC Pyunik, the Armenia U-21 team and FC Gandzasar Kapan.

He became 1975 Soviet Cup winner playing for FC Ararat Yerevan.

He is currently the sports director of the newly revived FC Kotayk Abovyan.
