= Tengiz Ugrekhelidze =

Georgian footballer (born 1981)

Personal information
- Date of birth: 29 July 1981 (age 45)
- Place of birth: Sukhumi, Georgian SSR, Soviet Union
- Height: 1.75 m (5 ft 9 in)
- Position: Defender

Youth career
- 1999–2000: Iberia Tbilisi

Senior career*
| Years | Team | Apps | (Gls) |
| 2000–2001 | Iberia Tbilisi | 10 | (2) |
| 2001–2004 | Nyva Ternopil | 39 | (1) |
| 2001 | → Ternopil-Nyva-2 | 1 | (0) |
| 2002 | → Torpedo-MAZ Minsk (loan) | 0 | (0) |
| 2003 | → Sioni Bolnisi (loan) | 11 | (0) |
| 2004 | → Lokomotivi Tbilisi (loan) | 16 | (1) |
| 2005 | Sioni Bolnisi | 12 | (0) |
| 2005 | Dinamo Batumi | 10 | (0) |
| 2005–2006 | Dinamo Sokhumi | 11 | (0) |
| 2006 | Torpedo Kutaisi | 5 | (1) |
| 2007–2014 | Ulisses | 141 | (1) |
- * Club domestic league appearances and goals

Tengiz Ugrekhelidze (born 29 July 1981) is a Georgian former professional footballer who played as a defender.

== Career ==
Ugrekhelidze joined Ukrainian Premier League side Nyva Ternopil in 2001. He left for Georgian league side Torpedo Kutaisi in 2004.

Ugrekhelidze played for the Georgia national team at various junior levels.
