= Renato de Moraes =

Brazilian footballer

Personal information
- Full name: Renato de Moraes
- Date of birth: August 16, 1980 (age 46)
- Place of birth: São Paulo, Brazil
- Height: 1.76 m (5 ft 9 in)
- Position: Midfielder

Senior career*
Years	Team	Apps	(Gls)
1999–2003	ADAP	10	(7)
2003–2009	Ararat Yerevan	92	(25)
2009–2010	NK Rudar Velenje	35	(3)
2011	Ulisses	7	(0)
- * Club domestic league appearances and goals as of 13 December 2016

Renato de Moraes (born August 16, 1980) is a retired Brazilian midfielder.
