= Sergei Berezin (footballer) =

Russian footballer and coach

Personal information
- Full name: Sergei Ivanovich Berezin
- Date of birth: 29 February 1960 (age 66)
- Height: 1.81 m (5 ft 11 1/2 in)
- Position: Forward

Senior career*
Years	Team	Apps	(Gls)
1978	FC Spartak Moscow	0	(0)
1981–1985	FC SKA Khabarovsk	206	(50)
1986–1987	PFC CSKA Moscow	46	(19)

Managerial career
- 1991–1992: PFC CSKA-2 Moscow (director)
- 1993–1994: PFC CSKA-2 Moscow
- 1996: FC MChS-Selyatino Selyatino (assistant)
- 1997: PFC CSKA-d Moscow
- 1998–1999: PFC CSKA Moscow (assistant)
- 1998: PFC CSKA-2 Moscow
- 2000–2004: PFC CSKA Moscow (reserves assistant)
- 2004–2006: FC Sodovik Sterlitamak (assistant)
- 2007: FC Baltika Kaliningrad (assistant)
- 2009: FC Volgar-Gazprom-2 Astrakhan (assistant)
- 2011–2012: FC Avangard Kursk (assistant)
- 2012–2013: FC Amur-2010 Blagoveshchensk
- * Club domestic league appearances and goals

Sergei Ivanovich Berezin (Russian: Серге́й Иванович Березин; born 29 February 1960) is a Russian professional football coach and a former player.
