= Konstantin Malkov =

American mathematician and businessman

Konstantin Malkov is an American mathematician and businessman, Chief Technology Officer and Director of AI1 Technologies (https://www.ai1technologies.com/). Previously at 5nine Software, an Acronis Company (https://www.acronis.com/en-us/products/cloud-manager/). His works are in the area of mathematical modelling; non-linear differential equations, AI/ML, network security and mathematical methods in economics.

Malkov is a co-founder of the Department of Non-linear Dynamic Analysis and the I&C Laboratory at Moscow State University. Malkov has managed and overseen dozens of commercial projects in secure messaging, ML/AI, control, workflow, data mining, virtualization, network security, business analytics and mathematical modeling in the US and Europe.

He has authored more than 50 scientific articles on differential equations, numerical analysis, control theory, seismological inverse problems, mathematical methods in economics, and artificial intelligence. He is a former Professor of Applied Mathematics and Computer Science at Moscow State University. He received Ph.D.s in Mathematics and Computer Science in 1986 and a Doctor of Science in 1990 from that institution. He is listed in Marquis's Who is Who in the World, won a USSR Young Scientists Prize in Mathematics in 1989, and has been a member of the IEEE since 1999. Resides in the US since 1991.
