= 2011 Armenian Cup =

Tournament details
- Country: Armenia
- Teams: 8

Final positions
- Champions: Mika
- Runners-up: Shirak

Tournament statistics
- Matches played: 13
- Goals scored: 31 (2.38 per match)

The 2011 Armenian Cup was the 20th season of Armenia's football knockout competition. It featured the eight 2011 Premier League teams. The tournament began on 10 March 2011. Pyunik were the defending champions. The winners entered the second qualifying round of the 2011–12 UEFA Europa League.

== Results ==
=== Quarter-finals ===
All eight Premier League clubs competed in this round. The first legs were played on 10 and 11 March 2011, with the second legs to be competed on 14 and 15 March 2011.

Team 1	Agg.	Team 2	1st leg	2nd leg
Shirak	2–1	Pyunik	1–1	1–0
Banants	3–1	Gandzasar	3–0	0–1
Ulisses	2–0	Ararat Yerevan	1–0	1–0
Mika	5–2	Impulse	3–0	2–2

=== Semi-finals ===
The four winners from the quarterfinals entered this round. The first legs were played on 30 March and 6 April 2011, with the second legs to be competed on 20 and 27 April 2011.

Team 1	Agg.	Team 2	1st leg	2nd leg
Shirak	2–1	Ulisses	0–1	2–0
Mika	4–3	Banants	3–3	1–0

=== Final ===
11 May 2011
17:00 CEST

Shirak	1 – 4	Mika
Barikyan 42'	Report	Alex 16'; Beglaryan 35', 67'; Dong 90'

Republican Stadium, Yerevan
Attendance: 9,300
Referee: David Fernández Borbalán (Spain)

== See also ==
- 2011 Armenian Premier League
- 2011 Armenian First League
