= Nabil Guelsifi =

French-Algerian footballer (born 1986)

Nabil Guelsifi (born 27 November 1986) is a French former professional footballer who played as a forward.

== Career ==
Guelsifi was born in Lille, France. He joined Belgian club K.S.K. Ronse in 2007, achieving promotion to the Belgian Second Division in his first season there. He remained at Ronse until summer 2010 when he signed for K.S.V. Oudenaarde. In 2011 he joined Al-Muharraq SC in Bahrain for six months before signing for JS Massira in Morocco. He moved to Jeunesse Esch in Luxembourg in 2013.

== Honours ==
Jeunesse Esch

- Luxembourg Cup: 2012–13
