= Giorgi Krasovski =

Georgian footballer

Georgi Krasovski
Personal information
- Full name: Georgi Krasovski
- Date of birth: 20 December 1979 (age 46)
- Place of birth: Poti, Georgia
- Height: 1.88 m (6 ft 2 in)
- Position: Defender

Senior career*
Years	Team	Apps	(Gls)
1997–2004	Kolkheti-1913 Poti	85	(7)
2004–2005	Trialeti Tsalka	11	(10)
2004–2005	Senakuri	?	(?)
2005–2006	Kolkheti-1913 Poti	27	(4)
2006–2007	Torpedo Kutaisi	12	(3)
2006–2007	Gabala	11	(0)
2007–2008	Mglebi Zugdidi	20	(2)
2008	Andijan	?	(?)
2009	Ararat Yerevan	25	(0)
2010–2011	Ulisses	48	(15)
2011–2012	Mes Sarcheshmeh	1	(0)
2012	Ulisses	5	(0)
2012	Gandzasar Kapan	0	(0)
2013–2014	Kolkheti-1913 Poti	40	(2)
2014–2016	Skuri Tsalenjikha	41	(9)
- * Club domestic league appearances and goals as of 17 August 2017

Georgi Krasovski (born 20 December 1979 in Poti, Georgian SSR) is a retired Georgian/Polish professional football player who played as a defender.

== Career statistics ==
As of 28 February 2014

Club statistics
Season	Club	League	League		Cup		Other		Total	
Season	Club	League	App	Goals	App	Goals	App	Goals	App	Goals
2006–07	Torpedo Kutaisi	Umaglesi Liga	12	3			—		12	3
2006–07	Gabala	Azerbaijan Premier League	11	0			—		11	0
2007–08	Mglebi Zugdidi	Umaglesi Liga	20	2			—		20	2
2009	Ararat Yerevan	Armenian Premier League	25	0	2	0	-		27	0
2010	Ulisses	Armenian Premier League	24	4	4	0	2	0	30	4
2011	Ulisses	Armenian Premier League	25	8	7	2	2	0	34	10
2011–12	Mes Sarcheshmeh	Iran Pro League	1	0			—		1	0
2012–13	Gandzasar	Armenian Premier League	0	0	0	0	2	0	2	0
2012–13	Ulisses	Armenian Premier League	5	0			—		5	0
2012–13	Kolkheti-1913 Poti	Umaglesi Liga	25	0	4	1	—		29	1
2013–14	Kolkheti-1913 Poti	Pirveli Liga	9	1	4	1	—		13	2
Total	Georgia		62	4	8	2	0	0	70	7
Total	Azerbaijan		11	0			0	0	11	0
Total	Armenia		79	12	13	2	6	0	98	14
Total	Iran		1	0			0	0	1	0
Total			151	16	21	4	6	0	179	20
