= Kenan Čejvanović =

Bosnian footballer (born 1986)

Personal information
- Date of birth: 9 August 1986 (age 40)
- Place of birth: Tuzla, SFR Yugoslavia
- Height: 1.91 m (6 ft 3 in)
- Position: Defender

Youth career
- 1996–2001: NK Slaven Živinice
- 2001–2004: FK Sloboda Tuzla

Senior career*
Years	Team	Apps	(Gls)
2004–2008	Sloboda Tuzla	115	(8)
2009–2010	Rijeka	21	(0)
2010–2012	Karlovac	21	(1)
2012–2013	Gorica	14	(0)
2013	Ararat Yerevan	9	(0)
2014	Sloboda Tuzla	12	(0)
2014–2015	Radnički Lukavac	13	(0)
2015–2016	Villastadens IF		
2016	Vinogradar		
2016–2017	NK Zagora		
2017	Dubrava		
2017	Segesta		
2018	Pajde		

International career
2007–2008	Bosnia and Herzegovina	2	(0)
- * Club domestic league appearances and goals

Kenan Čejvanović (born 9 August 1986) is a Bosnianformer professional footballer who played as a defender.

== Club career ==
Čejvanović started his professional career at FK Sloboda Tuzla, accumulating 110 caps and 8 goals during his four seasons in the first team, establishing himself in the U21 national team and gaining two caps for the A national team. In July 2008 he signed a five-year contract with the Romanian club Politehnica Timișoara, but the deal fell through and the contract was annulled because the Romanian club could not find a way to pay the transfer fee before the end of the transfer period, on account of Sloboda Tuzla's accounts in Bosnia being blocked, so Čejvanović returned to Tuzla, playing five more games for Sloboda Tuzla, before being transferred in January 2009 to the Croatian club HNK Rijeka.

After a one and a half seasons in Rijeka without attaining a secure spot in the first eleven for longer periods, he was transferred to NK Karlovac, signing a two-year deal.

== International career ==
Čejvanović made his debut for Bosnia and Herzegovina in a June 2008 friendly match against Azerbaijan in which he came on as a stoppage time substitute. It remained his sole official international appearance. He also played in an unofficial match against Poland in 2007.
