= Eduard Chudnowski =

Belarusian professional football player

Personal information
- Date of birth: 3 January 1991 (age 35)
- Place of birth: Minsk, Belarusian SSR
- Height: 1.80 m (5 ft 11 in)
- Position: Midfielder

Youth career
- 2006–2010: BATE Borisov

Senior career*
Years	Team	Apps	(Gls)
2011–2013	BATE Borisov	0	(0)
2012	→ Dnepr Mogilev (loan)	5	(0)
2012	→ Beltransgaz Slonim (loan)	13	(1)
2013	→ Volna Pinsk (loan)	26	(1)
2014	Ararat Yerevan	2	(0)
2014	Kletsk	12	(0)
2015	Lida	30	(2)
2016–2018	Smorgon	54	(2)
2018	Orsha	8	(0)
2019	Molodechno	7	(0)

International career
2010	Belarus U21	3	(0)
- * Club domestic league appearances and goals as of 31 December 2019

Eduard Chudnowski (Belarusian: Эдуард Чудноўскi; Russian: Эдуард Чудновский; born 3 January 1991) is a Belarusian former professional football player.
