= David G. Grigoryan =

Armenian footballer

Personal information
- Full name: David G. Grigoryan
- Date of birth: 17 July 1989 (age 37)
- Place of birth: Armenia
- Height: 1.75 m (5 ft 9 in)
- Position: Midfielder

Senior career*
Years	Team	Apps	(Gls)
2006–2009	Ararat Yerevan-2		
2009	Ararat Yerevan	21	(0)
2012–2013	King Delux		
2013–2015	Ararat Yerevan	49	(0)
2015–	Mika	2	(0)
2017–2018	Ararat Yerevan	7	(0)

International career
2009	Armenia	1	(0)
- * Club domestic league appearances and goals

David G. Grigoryan (born 17 July 1989), is a retired Armenian football midfielder who made one appearance for the Armenia national football team.

== Career statistics ==
=== International ===
As of match played 12 August 2009

Appearances and goals by national team and year
National team	Year	Apps	Goals
Armenia	2009	1	0
Total		1	0
