= King Delux FC =

King Delux
- Full name: King Delux Football Club
- Founded: 2012; 14 years ago
- Dissolved: 2012; 14 years ago
- Ground: Abovyan City Stadium; Abovyan
- Capacity: 3,946
- Owner: "King Deluxe" Company
- Chairman: Gagik Hovhannisyan
- Manager: Armen Sanamyan
Home colours	Away colours	Third colours

King Delux Football Club, (Armenian: Կինգ Դելյուքս Ֆուտբոլային Ակումբ), was a short-lived Armenian football club from Abovyan, Kotayk Province.

The club was founded in 2012 by the transport company King Deluxe owned by Artur Harutyunyan. and participated in the 2012–13 season of the Armenian First League. However, the club was dissolved during the same season, after only playing 10 matches in the league.

== League and domestic cup history ==
Season	League									Armenian Independence Cup	Top goalscorer		Manager
Season	Div.	Pos.	Pl.	W	D	L	GS	GA	P	Armenian Independence Cup	Name	League	Manager
2012–13	2nd	9th	36	10	3	23	44	79	33	no participation			
2013–present	No Participation												
