= Alex (footballer, born January 1982) =

Armenian footballer

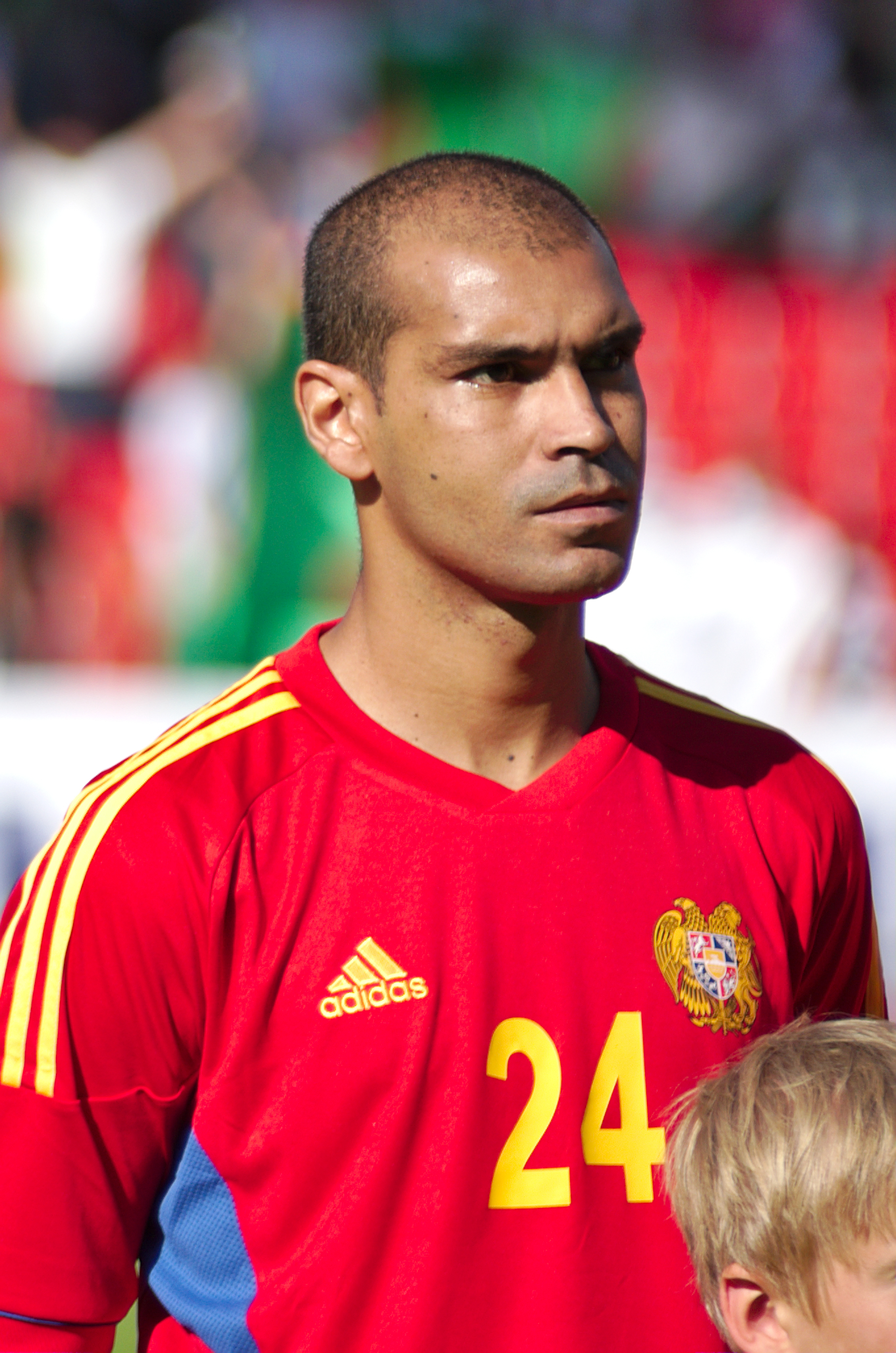

Personal information
- Full name: Alex Henrique da Silva
- Date of birth: 6 January 1982 (age 44)
- Place of birth: Ribeirão Preto, Brazil
- Height: 1.84 m (6 ft 0 in)
- Position: Defender

Senior career*
| Years | Team | Apps | (Gls) |
| 2001–2005 | Botafogo FC (SP) | | |
| 2005–2006 | São Carlos | | |
| 2006–2015 | Mika Yerevan | 229 | (36) |
| 2008 | → Volga Ulyanovsk (loan) | 16 | (1) |

International career^{‡}
| 2014 | Armenia | 2 | (0) |
- * Club domestic league appearances and goals as of 16 October 2015 ‡ National team caps and goals as of 31 May 2014

Alex Henrique da Silva, better known as Alex (pronounced: [aˈlɛks]; born 6 January 1982), is a retired football player known for playing at the Yerevan-based FC Mika of the Armenian Premier League. Born in Brazil, he represented the Armenia national team.

== International career ==
Alex made his debut with the Armenia national football team in a friendly against the United Arab Emirates national football team on 27 May 2014 in Switzerland.

== Statistics ==
=== Club ===
Club statistics
| Season | Club | League | League | | Cup | | Other | | Total | |
| Season | Club | League | App | Goals | App | Goals | App | Goals | App | Goals |
|---|---|---|---|---|---|---|---|---|---|---|
| 2006 | Mika | Armenian Premier League | 27 | 6 | | | 2 | 0 | 29 | 6 |
| 2007 | Mika | Armenian Premier League | 26 | 8 | | | 4 | 1 | 30 | 9 |
| 2008 | Mika | Armenian Premier League | 11 | 0 | | | 1 | 0 | 12 | 0 |
| 2008 | Volga Ulyanovsk | Russian First Division | 16 | 1 | | | - | | 16 | 1 |
| 2009 | Mika | Armenian Premier League | 24 | 5 | | | 2 | 0 | 26 | 5 |
| 2010 | Mika | Armenian Premier League | 27 | 3 | 3 | 0 | 2 | 0 | 32 | 3 |
| 2011 | Mika | Armenian Premier League | 24 | 3 | 7 | 1 | 2 | 0 | 31 | 4 |
| 2012–13 | Mika | Armenian Premier League | 38 | 4 | 6 | 0 | - | | 42 | 4 |
| 2013–14 | Mika | Armenian Premier League | 26 | 3 | 4 | 0 | 2 | 0 | 32 | 3 |
| 2014–15 | Mika | Armenian Premier League | 26 | 4 | 3 | 2 | 2 | 0 | 31 | 6 |
| Total | Armenia | | 229 | 36 | 23 | 2 | 17 | 1 | 249 | 39 |
| Total | Russia | | 16 | 1 | | | 0 | 0 | 16 | 1 |
| Total | | | 245 | 36 | 23 | 2 | 17 | 1 | 285 | 40 |

=== International ===
Armenia national team
| Year | Apps | Goals |
|---|---|---|
| 2014 | 2 | 0 |
| Total | 2 | 0 |

Statistics accurate as of match played 31 May 2014

== Honours ==
Mika

- Armenian Cup
  - Winner (2): 2006, 2011
