= 2013–14 Armenian Premier League =

Armenian Premier League
- Season: 2013–14
- Champions: Banants
- Relegated: none
- Champions League: Banants
- Europa League: Shirak; Mika; Pyunik
- Matches: 112
- Goals: 288 (2.57 per match)
- Top goalscorer: (Armenia) Mihran Manasyan (17 goals)
- Biggest home win: Gandzasar 9–2 Alashkert; Banants 7–0 Alashkert
- Biggest away win: Alashkert 0–5 Pyunik
- Highest scoring: Gandzasar 9–2 Alashkert

The 2013–14 Armenian Premier League season was the twenty-second since its establishment. Shirak F.C. were the winners. The league started on 3 August 2013.

== Teams ==
Location of teams in the 2013–14 Armenian Premier League

Club	Location	Stadium	Capacity
Alashkert	Yerevan	Republican Stadium (Yerevan); Hrazdan Stadium (Yerevan)^{1}	14,403; 54,208
Ararat Yerevan	Yerevan	Hrazdan Stadium	54,208
Banants	Yerevan	Banants Stadium	5,010
Gandzasar	Kapan	Gandzasar Stadium	3,500
Mika	Yerevan	Mika Stadium	7,250
Pyunik	Yerevan	Football Academy Stadium	1,428
Shirak	Gyumri	Gyumri City Stadium	2,844
Ulisses	Yerevan	Republican Stadium; City Stadium (Abovyan)^{2}	14,403; 3,946

- ^{1}FC Alashkert moved to the Hrazdan Stadium starting from matchday 16.
- ^{2}Ulisses FC moved to the City Stadium in Abovyan starting from matchday 17.

== League table ==
Pos	Team	Pld	W	D	L	GF	GA	GD	Pts	Qualification
1	Banants (C)	28	14	8	6	38	23	+15	50	Qualification for the Champions League first qualifying round
2	Shirak	28	13	8	7	48	31	+17	47	Qualification for the Europa League first qualifying round
3	Mika	28	12	11	5	36	27	+9	47	Qualification for the Europa League first qualifying round
4	Ararat Yerevan	28	12	8	8	30	23	+7	44	
5	Gandzasar Kapan	28	8	11	9	36	31	+5	35	
6	Pyunik	28	8	8	12	41	39	+2	32	Qualification for the Europa League first qualifying round (Note: Winners of 2013–14 Armenian Cup will qualify for the first qualifying round of the UEFA Europa League.)
7	Ulisses	28	7	4	17	21	46	−25	25	
8	Alashkert	28	6	6	16	38	69	−31	24	

Source: Soccerway
Rules for classification: 1) points; 2) goal difference; 3) number of goals scored.
(C) Champions

== Results ==
The league will be played in four stages. The teams will play four times with each other, twice at home and twice away, for a total of 28 matches per team.

=== First half of season ===
Home \ Away	ALA	ARA	BAN	GAN	MIK	PYU	SHI	ULI
Alashkert		0–3	2–2	2–1	1–2	0–5	1–1	1–2
Ararat Yerevan	5–0		0–0	3–2	0–1	2–0	0–3	2–0
Banants	7–0	0–0		0–0	2–1	2–2	1–0	2–1
Gandzasar Kapan	9–2	0–1	2–1		1–1	2–3	2–0	1–0
Mika	0–2	0–1	0–0	1–1		3–0	2–2	2–1
Pyunik	3–1	0–1	0–0	2–2	1–1		1–2	3–3
Shirak	5–2	1–1	2–1	2–3	1–1	0–2		2–1
Ulisses	1–1	0–1	1–0	0–0	1–1	1–0	0–3	

Source: Soccerway
Legend: Blue = home team win; Yellow = draw; Red = away team win.

=== Second half of season ===
Home \ Away	ALA	ARA	BAN	GAN	MIK	PYU	SHI	ULI
Alashkert		0–0	2–2	2–3	0–1	5–1	1–2	5–1
Ararat Yerevan	1–0		1–2	0–0	1–1	1–1	1–4	1–2
Banants	2–0	2–1		1–0	2–3	1–0	3–1	2–0
Gandzasar Kapan	0–2	2–1	2–0		1–2	0–0	0–0	0–2
Mika	1–1	2–0	2–0	0–0		2–1	1–1	4–0
Pyunik	5–1	0–1	0–1	1–1	4–0		2–1	2–0
Shirak	4–1	0–0	0–1	1–1	2–0	3–1		3–1
Ulisses	0–3	0–1	0–1	1–0	0–1	2–1	0–2	

Source: Soccerway
Legend: Blue = home team win; Yellow = draw; Red = away team win.

== Top goalscorers ==
Rank	Player	Team	Goals
1	(Armenia) Mihran Manasyan	Alashkert	17
2	(Ivory Coast) Serges Déblé	Shirak	15
3	(Armenia) Gevorg Nranyan	Ararat Yerevan	10
3	(Serbia) Aleksandar Rakić	Ararat Yerevan	10
3	(Armenia) Sarkis Baloyan	Pyunik	10
4	(Senegal) Dame Diop	Shirak	9
5	(Armenia) Narek Beglaryan	Gandzasar	8
5	(Armenia) Vardges Satumyan	Mika	8

== See also ==
- 2013–14 Armenian First League
- 2013–14 Armenian Cup
