= Arsen Balabekyan =

Armenian football striker

Personal information
- Full name: Arsen Armeni Balabekyan
- Date of birth: 24 November 1986 (age 39)
- Place of birth: Yerevan, Soviet Armenia
- Height: 1.82 m (6 ft 0 in)
- Position: Striker

Youth career
- 2004–2005: FC Kotayk

Senior career*
Years	Team	Apps	(Gls)
2004–2006	FC Kotayk	33	(4)
2006–2012	FC Banants	134	(36)
2012–2013	Ulisses FC	40	(11)
2013–2015	FC Ararat Yerevan	45	(3)
2015–2017	Alashkert FC	36	(3)

International career^{‡}
2006–2008	Armenia U-21	10	(0)
2009	Armenia	1	(0)
- * Club domestic league appearances and goals as of 23 November 2016 ‡ National team caps and goals as of 11 February 2009

Arsen Balabekyan (Armenian: Արսեն Բալաբեկյան, born 24 November 1986), is a former Armenian football striker.

He began his career at FC Kotayk of Abovyan, but soon found himself at FC Banants.

== Achievements ==
- Armenian Cup with Banants Yerevan: 2007
