= David Grigoryan (footballer, born 1982) =

Armenian footballer

Personal information
- Full name: David Grigoryan
- Date of birth: 28 December 1982 (age 43)
- Place of birth: Yerevan, Soviet Armenia
- Height: 1.77 m (5 ft 9 1/2 in)
- Positions: Defender; left wing back

Senior career*
Years	Team	Apps	(Gls)
1999–1999	Yerevan	16	(0)
1999–2000	Dvin Artashat	3	(0)
2000–2004	Mika	96	(24)
2005–2007	Kyzylzhar	46	(3)
2007–2009	Mika	13	(2)
2009–2013	Ulisses	72	(8)
2013–2014	Ararat	26	(2)
2014–2015	Mika	17	(1)

International career^{‡}
2004–2005	Armenia	8	(0)
- * Club domestic league appearances and goals as of 15 April 2014 ‡ National team caps and goals as of 12 August 2009

David Grigoryan (Armenian: Դավիթ Գրիգորյան, born on 28 December 1982 in Yerevan, Soviet Union) is an Armenian football defender. He is currently unattached. Grigoryan was also a member of the Armenia national football team, and has participated in eight international matches since his debut in an away friendly match against Hungary on 18 February 2004.

== National team statistics ==
Armenia national team
Year	Apps	Goals
2004	5	0
2005	3	0
Total	8	0
