= 2012–13 Armenian Cup =

Tournament details
- Country: Armenia
- Teams: 9

Final positions
- Champions: Pyunik
- Runners-up: Shirak

Tournament statistics
- Matches played: 15
- Goals scored: 16 (1.07 per match)

The 2012–13 Armenian Cup was the 22nd season of Armenia's football knockout competition. It featured the eight 2012–13 Premier League teams and Alashkert Martuni from the 2012–13 First Division. The tournament began on 14 November 2012, with Shirak the defending champions, having won their first title the previous season. Pyunik beat defending champions Shirak 1-0 in the final, winning them their 5th Armenian Independence Cup. As winners, Pyunik qualify for the first qualifying round of the 2013–14 UEFA Europa League.

== Results ==
=== First round ===
Alashkert from the First Division played in the first round against Banants from the Premier League. The rest of the teams received a bye to the quarter-finals. The first leg was played on 14 November, with the second leg took place on 28 November 2012.

| Team 1 | Agg. | Team 2 | 1st leg | 2nd leg |
|---|---|---|---|---|
| Alashkert | 0−0 (5–4 pen.) | Banants | 0–0 | 0–0 (a.e.t.) |

=== Quarter-finals ===
The remaining seven Premier League clubs entered the competition in this round, together with the winner from the first round. The first legs were played on 1 March 2013, while the second legs were played on 12 March 2013.

| Team 1 | Agg. | Team 2 | 1st leg | 2nd leg |
|---|---|---|---|---|
| Ulisses | 0–2 | Mika | 0–0 | 0–2 |
| Shirak | 1–0 | Ararat Yerevan | 1–0 | 0–0 |
| Alashkert | 0–1 | Gandzasar | 0–0 | 0–1 |
| Pyunik | 5–2 | Impulse | 2–2 | 3–0 |

=== Semi-finals ===
The four winners from the quarterfinals entered this round. The first legs were played on 2 and 3 April 2013, with the second legs completed on 16 and 17 April 2013.

| Team 1 | Agg. | Team 2 | 1st leg | 2nd leg |
|---|---|---|---|---|
| Gandzasar | 1–2 | Pyunik | 0–1 | 1–1 |
| Mika | 0–1 | Shirak | 0–1 | 0–0 |

=== Final ===
7 May 2013
17:00 CEST

| Pyunik | 1 – 0 | Shirak |
|---|---|---|
| Voskanyan 39' | Report |

Hrazdan Stadium, Yerevan
Attendance: 2,500
Referee: Andranik Arsenyan
