= Eduard Veranyan =

Armenian footballer

Personal information
- Date of birth: 16 August 1963 (age 63)
- Height: 1.80 m (5 ft 11 in)
- Position: Forward

Senior career*
Years	Team	Apps	(Gls)
1984	FC Kotayk		
1985	FC Ararat Yerevan	4	(0)
1985	FC Kotayk	29	(15)
1986–1989	FC Ararat Yerevan	83	(10)
1990	FC Araks		
1991	FC Kotayk	30	(12)
1992	FC Araks		
1992	Syunik		
1992–1994	FC Guria Lanchkhuti		
1994–1995	Smena Saturn	72	(20)
- * Club domestic league appearances and goals

Eduard Veranyan (born 16 August 1963) is an Armenian former professional footballer.

In 1991, he moved from FC Araks to FC Kotayk.
