= Galust Petrosyan =

Armenian footballer

Personal information
- Full name: Galust Petrosyan
- Date of birth: 5 September 1981 (age 45)
- Place of birth: Yerevan, Armenian SSR
- Height: 1.95 m (6 ft 5 in)
- Position: Forward

Youth career
- 1996–1997: Arabkir Yerevan

Senior career*
| Years | Team | Apps | (Gls) |
| 1996–1997 | Arabkir Yerevan | 1 | (0) |
| 1998 | Ararat Yerevan | 7 | (0) |
| 1999 | Dvin Artashat | 20 | (3) |
| 2000–2001 | Dinamo Yerevan | 27 | (9) |
| 2001–2002 | Ararat Yerevan | 18 | (4) |
| 2003–2004 | Pyunik Yerevan | 37 | (33) |
| 2005–2007 | Zimbru Chişinău | 58 | (16) |
| 2008 | Smorgon | 24 | (0) |
| 2009 | Ararat Yerevan | 12 | (2) |
| 2009–2011 | Sanati Kaveh Tehran | | |
| 2011–2012 | Mes Sarcheshmeh | | |
| 2012 | Ulisses Yerevan | 8 | (0) |
| 2013–2014 | Ararat Yerevan | 8 | (0) |

International career^{‡}
| 2004–2006 | Armenia | 7 | (1) |
- * Club domestic league appearances and goals as of 22 October 2015 ‡ National team caps and goals as of 22 October 2015

Galust Petrosyan (Armenian: Գալուստ Պետրոսյան, born on 5 September 1981) is a retired Armenian football forward. He was a member of the Armenia national football team, with 7 caps and 1 goal scored.

== National team statistics ==
Armenia national team
| Year | Apps | Goals |
|---|---|---|
| 2004 | 3 | 1 |
| 2005 | 1 | 0 |
| 2006 | 3 | 0 |
| Total | 7 | 1 |
