= Mayis Azizyan =

Armenian professional footballer

Personal information
- Date of birth: 1 May 1978 (age 48)
- Height: 1.88 m (6 ft 2 in)
- Position: Goalkeeper

Senior career*
Years	Team	Apps	(Gls)
1995	Kotayk-2	6	(0)
1995–2001	Ararat Yerevan	45	(0)
2001–2004	Bargh Shiraz		
2004–2005	Kilikia	31	(0)
2006–2007	Mika	19	(0)
2007–2009	Ulisses	24	(1)
2010–2011	Impuls Dilijan	16	(0)
2011–2012	Aboomoslem		
2012–2013	Ararat Yerevan	14	(0)

International career
2008–2008	Armenia	3	(0)
- * Club domestic league appearances and goals as of 15 April 2015

Mayis Azizyan (Armenian: Մայիս Ազիզյան; born 1 May 1978) is an Armenian professional footballer.
