= Vladimir Malkov (footballer) =

Russian footballer

Personal information
- Full name: Vladimir Gennadyevich Malkov
- Date of birth: 15 January 1980 (age 46)
- Place of birth: Yoshkar-Ola, Russian SFSR
- Height: 1.84 m (6 ft 1/2 in)
- Position: Goalkeeper

Senior career*
Years	Team	Apps	(Gls)
1997–1999	Neftekhimik Nizhnekamsk	5	(0)
2000–2002	Diana Volzhsk	98	(0)
2003–2006	Nosta Novotroitsk	87	(0)
2006	Belshina Bobruisk	11	(0)
2007	Gazovik Orenburg	2	(0)
2008	Volga Ulyanovsk	7	(0)
2008	Bataysk-2007	14	(0)
2009	Volga Ulyanovsk	29	(0)
2010–2011	Ulisses	52	(0)
2012	Trans Narva	16	(0)
2013–2014	Spartak Yoshkar-Ola	32	(0)
- * Club domestic league appearances and goals

Vladimir Gennadyevich Malkov (Russian: Влади́мир Генна́дьевич Малко́в; born 15 January 1980) is a former Russian professional footballer.
