= Norayr Sahakyan =

Armenian footballer

Personal information
- Full name: Norayr Artashesi Sahakyan
- Date of birth: 7 October 1987 (age 39)
- Place of birth: Soviet Union
- Height: 1.76 m (5 ft 9 in)
- Position: Midfielder

Team information
- Current team: Alashkert FC
- Number: 22

Senior career*
Years	Team	Apps	(Gls)
2005–2010	Pyunik Yerevan	86	(5)
2010–2014	Ulisses	107	(8)
2014–	Alashkert FC	10	(0)

International career
2004	Armenia U-17	1	(0)
2005	Armenia U-19	2	(0)
2006–2008	Armenia U-21	5	(0)
2008–2008	Armenia	3	(0)
2014–	Artsakh	4	(0)
- * Club domestic league appearances and goals

Norayr Artashesi Sahakyan (Armenian: Նորայր Արտաշեսի Սահակյան; born 7 October 1987 in the Soviet Union) is an Armenian football midfielder who plays for club Armenian Premier League club Alashkert FC. He is also a member of the Armenia national team, participated in 3 international matches since his debut in away friendly match against Malta on 2 February 2008.

== Achievements ==
- Armenian Premier League with Pyunik FC: 2005, 2006, 2007, 2008, 2009
- Armenian Premier League with Ulisses F.C.: 2011
- Armenian Supercup with Pyunik FC: 2006
