= FC Gandzasar Kapan =

Armenian football club

Gandzasar Kapan
- Full name: Football Club Gandzasar Kapan
- Nickname: Արջեր Arjér (The Bears)
- Founded: 2004; 22 years ago
- Ground: Kapan Stadium, Kapan
- Capacity: 3,000
- Owner: Zangezur Copper and Molybdenum Combine CJSC
- Executive director: Vardan Djhanyan
- Manager: Karen Barseghyan
- League: Armenian Premier League
- 2025–26: 8th of 11
- Website: gandzasar-fc.am
Home colours	Away colours

FC Gandzasar Kapan is an Armenian professional football club based in the town of Kapan, Syunik Province. The club plays in Armenian Premier League. Its headquarters are located on 18 Garegin Nzhdeh street, Kapan. The Gandzasar Kapan Training Centre is located at the eastern outskirts of the town of Kapan.

The club is under the ownership of Zangezur Copper and Molybdenum Combine Closed Joint-Stock Company since 25 February 2015.

== History ==
The club was founded in 2004 and made their debut in the Armenian football league system in the 2004 Armenian First League competition. They spent 2 years playing in the Armenian First League before getting promoted to the Armenian Premier League for the 2006 season.

As of 2024–25 season, Gandzasar Kapan will play in the Armenian Premier League, the top division in Armenian football. The home ground of team is the Gandzasar Stadium. The club also runs a reserve team known as Gandzasar Kapan-2, which played in the First Division.

On 3 November 2020, Gandzasar Kapan announced that they were withdrawing from the Armenian Premier League and Armenian Cup due to the ongoing financial constraints relating to the ongoing COVID-19 pandemic in Armenia and the 2020 Nagorno-Karabakh conflict. They played in the Armenian First League, having entered in 2021–22 season. Following a 3rd-place finish in 2022–23 season (after FC West Armenia and BKMA Yerevan-2) Gandzasar stayed in the First League for the 2023–24 season. After playing 26 games (out of 28) in 2023–24 season, Gandzasar were officially declared champions and therefore directly promoted to the Armenian Premier League for 2024–25 season (this will be their first season in the Premier after withdrawing in 2020).

=== Domestic history ===
Season	League									National Cup	Top goalscorer		Manager
Season	Div.	Pos.	Pl.	W	D	L	GS	GA	P	National Cup	Name	League	Manager
2004	Armenian First League	3rd	30	17	6	7	52	32	57	no participation			
2005	Armenian First League	3rd	24	16	3	5	62	24	51	First Round			
2006	Armenian Premier League	5th	28	7	3	18	28	60	24	Quarter-final	(Armenia) Artur Kocharyan	15	(Armenia) Vladimir Petrosyan (Armenia) Albert Sarkisyan
2007	Armenian Premier League	5th	28	11	6	11	35	31	39	First round	(Armenia) Artur Kocharyan	8	(Armenia) Souren Barseghyan (Armenia) Abraham Khashmanyan (Armenia) Samvel Petrosyan
2008	Armenian Premier League	3rd	28	13	8	7	39	27	47	Quarter-final	(Armenia) Alexander Petrosyan	9	(Armenia) Samvel Petrosyan
2009	Armenian Premier League	5th	28	12	2	14	32	47	38	Quarter-final	(Armenia) Arsen Avetisyan	14	(Armenia) Samvel Petrosyan (Armenia) Avetik Sargsyan (Republic of Artsakh) Slava Gabrielyan
2010	Armenian Premier League	6th	28	8	3	17	24	45	27	Quarter-final	(Armenia) Artur Kocharyan	8	(Republic of Artsakh) Slava Gabrielyan (Armenia) Albert Sarkisyan
2011	Armenian Premier League	3rd	28	12	10	6	31	16	46	Quarter-final; Quarter-final	(Armenia) Arsen Avetisyan	5	(Armenia) Abraham Khashmanyan
2012–13	Armenian Premier League	3rd	42	18	13	11	48	37	67	Semi-final	(Brazil) Dhiego Lomba Farias	9	(Armenia) Abraham Khashmanyan (Armenia) Avetik Sargsyan (Armenia) Samvel Sargsyan (Armenia) Sevada Arzumanyan
2013–14	Armenian Premier League	5th	28	8	11	9	36	31	35	Runner-up	(Armenia) Narek Beglaryan	8	(Armenia) Sevada Arzumanyan (Armenia) Stepan Baghdasaryan (Ukraine) Serhiy Puchkov
2014–15	Armenian Premier League	7th	28	7	8	13	31	44	29	Quarter-final	(Armenia) Gegham Harutyunyan (Ukraine) Vasil Palagnyuk	6	(Ukraine) Serhiy Puchkov (Armenia) Samvel Petrosyan
2015–16	Armenian Premier League	4th	28	11	12	5	35	27	45	Semi-final	(Armenia) Gegham Harutyunyan (Armenia) Narek Beglaryan	5	(Armenia) Samvel Petrosyan (Armenia) Ashot Barseghyan
2016–17	Armenian Premier League	2nd	30	17	6	7	38	24	57	Semi-final	(Armenia) Gegham Harutyunyan	12	(Armenia) Ashot Barseghyan
2017–18	Armenian Premier League	3rd	30	11	10	9	43	34	43	Winner	(Armenia) Gegham Harutyunyan	12	(Armenia) Karen Barseghyan (Armenia) Ashot Barseghyan
2018–19	Armenian Premier League	6th	32	10	8	14	38	33	38	Quarter-final	(Armenia) Gegham Harutyunyan	8	(Armenia) Ashot Barseghyan (Armenia) Armen Petrosyan
2019–20	Armenian Premier League	9th	22	6	7	9	25	29	25	Semi-final	(Armenia) Gegham Harutyunyan	6	(Armenia) Armen Petrosyan
2020–21	Armenian Premier League	10th	Withdrew							First Round			
2021–22	Armenian First League	3rd	28	10	7	11	38	47	37	did not enter	(Armenia) Orbeli Hambardzumyan	6	(Armenia) Tigran Gevorgyan
2022–23	Armenian First League	3rd	33	22	4	7	85	33	70	Semi-final	(Armenia) Alen Karapetyan	24	(Armenia) Tigran Gevorgyan
2023-24	Armenian First League	1st	28	24	2	2	69	17	74	Second round			
2024–25	Armenian Premier League	10th	30	2	4	24	16	73	10	Quarter-final	(Cameroon) Bertrand Mani	3	(Armenia) Karen Barseghyan

=== European history ===
As of match played 19 July 2018

Competition	Pld	W	D	L	GF	GA	GD
UEFA Europa League	12	2	0	10	8	27	–19
Total	12	2	0	10	8	27	–19

Season	Competition	Round	Club	Home	Away	Aggregate
2009–10	UEFA Europa League	2Q	(Netherlands) NAC Breda	0–2	0–6	0–8
2012–13	UEFA Europa League	1Q	(Faroe Islands) EB/Streymur	2–0	1–3	3–3 (a)
2012–13	UEFA Europa League	2Q	(Switzerland) Servette	1–3	0–2	1–5
2013–14	UEFA Europa League	1Q	(Kazakhstan) Aktobe	1–2	1–2	2–4
2017–18	UEFA Europa League	1Q	(Montenegro) Mladost Podgorica	0–3	0–1	0–4
2018–19	UEFA Europa League	1Q	(Poland) Lech Poznań	2–1	0–2	2–3

== Stadium ==
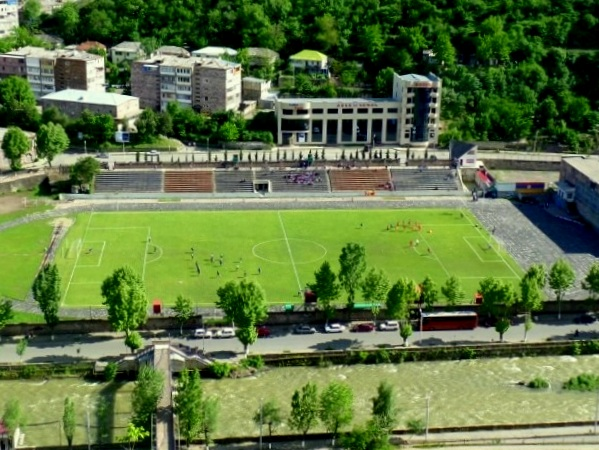
Gandzasar Stadium, the home of Gandzasar

The club play their home games at the Gandzasar Stadium, also known as Kapan City Stadium, which has a capacity of 3,500. It is situated at the centre of the town of Kapan, on the left bank of Voghji River. At the beginning of 2017, they temporarily moved to the Vazgen Sargsyan Republican Stadium in Yerevan due to renovations at the Gandzasar Stadium.

== Youth academy ==
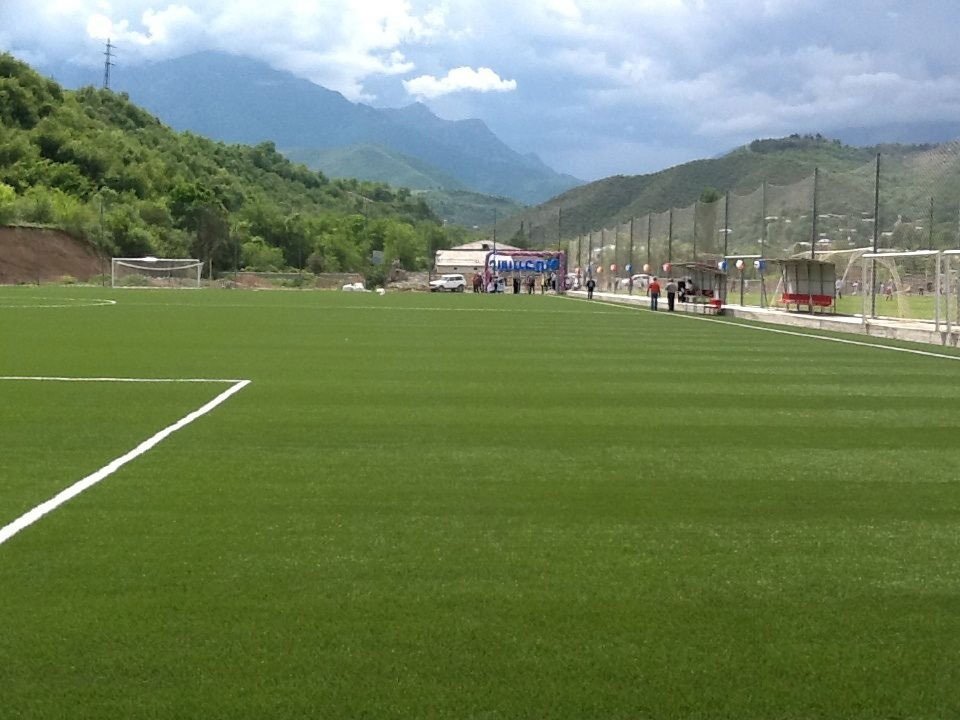
Gandzasar Kapan Training Centre in Kapan

Gandzasar Kapan run their own youth training academy in the town of Kapan since its inauguration in May 2013. Being home to natural-grass as well as artificial-turf training pitches, the centre occupies an area of 35,000 m^{2}. In addition to Kapan, the club also runs a football school in the Shengavit District of the capital Yerevan.

== Players ==
=== Current squad ===
As of 9 September 2026

Note: Flags indicate national team as defined under FIFA eligibility rules; some limited exceptions apply. Players may hold more than one non-FIFA nationality.

No.	Pos.	Nation	Player
1	GK	ARM	Grigori Matevosyan
2	DF	ARM	Artur Mikhaelyan
3	DF	ARM	Mher Kankanyan
4	DF	ARM	Hovhannes Gevorgyan
5	DF	ARM	Serob Grigoryan
6	DF	BRA	Atila
7	FW	CHA	Bertrand Mani
8	FW	COL	Ethan Lizalda
9	FW	MLI	Kalifala Doumbia (on loan from Noah)
10	MF	ARM	Artur Israelyan
11	FW	BRA	João Adriano
13	GK	ARM	Anatoliy Ayvazov

No.	Pos.	Nation	Player
14	MF	BEN	Mariano Ahouangbo
15	DF	GHA	Annan Mensah
18	FW	ARM	Artem Avanesyan
19	MF	ARM	Patvakan Avetisyan
21	MF	POR	Leo Reis
22	DF	ARM	Marat Asatryan
23	MF	LUX	Lucca Rodrigues
33	DF	BRA	Robson
34	MF	AUT	Dean Titkov
55	DF	JPN	Shunto Kanda
77	GK	ARM	Davit Davtyan (on loan from Noah)
79	MF	POR	Tomás Rocha

== Gandzasar Kapan-2 ==
Gandzasar Kapan-2
- Founded: 2006; 20 years ago
- Ground: Gandzasar Kapan Training Centre, Kapan
- Owner: Zangezur Copper and Molybdenum Combine CJSC
- Executive Director: Garnik Aghababian
- Manager: Ashot Manucharyan
- League: Armenian First League
- 2016–17: 4th
Home colours	Away colours

FC Gandzasar Kapan's reserve squad played as Gandzasar Kapan-2 in the Armenian First League. They played their home games at the training field with artificial turf of the Gandzasar Kapan Training Centre.

== Personnel ==
=== Management ===
Position	Name
Executive director	(Armenia) Vardan Djhanyan
Deputy director	(Armenia) Arthur Margaryan
Press secretary	(Armenia) Spartak Petrosyan

=== Technical staff ===
Position	Name
Manager	(Armenia) Tigran Gevorgyan
Assistant	(Armenia) Norayr Tamrazyan
Assistant	(Armenia) Tigran Ivanyan
Goalkeeping coach	(Armenia) Tigran Ghazaryan
Doctor	(Armenia) Ara Aramyan

== Managerial history ==
- (Armenia) Albert Sarkisyan (1 February 2006 – 1 December 2006)
- (Armenia) Souren Barseghyan (2007)
- (Armenia) Abraham Khashmanyan (2007)
- (Armenia) Samvel Petrosyan (2007–09)
- (Armenia) Slava Gabrielyan (1 July 2009–10)
- (Armenia) Albert Sarkisyan (20 April 2010 – 20 December 2010)
- (Armenia) Abraham Khashmanyan (2010–12)
- (Armenia) Samvel Sargsyan (24 May 2012 – 12 September 12)
- (Armenia) Sevada Arzumanyan (8 September 2012 – 14 April 2014)
- (Ukraine) Serhiy Puchkov (30 April 2014 – 2 December 2014)
- (Armenia) Ashot Barseghyan (11 March 2015 – 12 July 2017)
- (Armenia) Karen Barseghyan (13 July 2017 – 26 March 2018)
- (Armenia) Ashot Barseghyan (26 March 2018 – 30 April 2019)
- (Armenia) Armen Petrosyan (1 May 2019 – 3 November 2020)
- (Armenia) Tigran Gevorgyan (1 May 2021 – July 2022)

== Honours ==
- Armenian First League
  - Winners: 2023–24
- Armenian Cup
  - Winners: 2017–18
  - Runners-up: 2013–14
- Armenian Super Cup
  - Runners-up: 2018

== See also ==
- Football in Armenia
- Football Federation of Armenia
