= 2003 in Armenian football =

Premier League champions
- Pyunik

First League champions
- Kilikia

Armenian Cup winners
- Mika Ashtarak

== Premier League ==
- FC Armavir are promoted, but withdrew before the start of the season.
- Araks are promoted to replace FC Armavir.
- Spartak Yerevan was dissolved and the players moved to Banants.

Pos	Team	Pld	W	D	L	GF	GA	GD	Pts	Qualification or relegation
1	Pyunik (C)	28	23	5	0	87	11	+76	74	Qualification for the Champions League first qualifying round
2	Banants	28	21	3	4	89	15	+74	66	Qualification for the UEFA Cup first qualifying round
3	Shirak	28	17	2	9	63	34	+29	53	Qualification for the UEFA Cup first qualifying round
4	Mika Ashtarak	28	15	6	7	49	29	+20	51	Qualification for the UEFA Cup first qualifying round
5	Kotayk	28	8	7	13	29	56	−27	31	
6	Dinamo-2000 Yerevan	28	5	4	19	18	69	−51	19	
7	Lernagorts Kapan	28	3	6	19	20	72	−52	15	
8	Araks (R)	28	2	3	23	17	86	−69	9	Relegation to First League
9	Ararat Yerevan (E, R)	0	0	0	0	0	0	0	0	Expelled (Note: Ararat Yerevan were expelled before start of the season.)
10	Lernayin Artsakh (W)	0	0	0	0	0	0	0	0	Withdrew (Note: Lernayin Artsakh, Zvartnots-AAL and Armavir were withdraw before start of the season.)
11	Zvartnots-AAL (W)	0	0	0	0	0	0	0	0	Withdrew
12	Armavir (W)	0	0	0	0	0	0	0	0	Withdrew

Source: RSSSF
(C) Champions; (E) Expelled; (R) Relegated; (W) Withdrew

== First League ==
- Newly created FC Vagharshapat are introduced to the league.
- FC Dinamo Yerevan and Yerazank FC returned to professional football.
- Spartak Yerevan FC merged with FC Banants and was dropped to the First League as a result.

Pos	Team	Pld	W	D	L	GF	GA	GD	Pts	Promotion
1	Kilikia	22	20	0	2	88	14	+74	60	Champions, promotion to Armenian Premier League
2	Vagharshapat	22	16	2	4	61	24	+37	50	
3	Pyunik-2	22	15	3	4	74	27	+47	48	
4	Lokomotiv Yerevan	22	12	3	7	46	33	+13	39	
5	Spartak Yerevan	22	11	3	8	34	31	+3	36	
6	Kotayk 2003	22	10	5	7	31	20	+11	35	
7	Mika-2	22	9	4	9	43	27	+16	31	
8	Dinamo Yerevan	22	9	4	9	29	44	−15	31	
9	Shirak-2	22	7	3	12	24	41	−17	24	
10	Lori	22	5	0	17	36	74	−38	15	
11	Nork Marash	22	3	3	16	23	64	−41	12	
12	Yerazank	22	0	0	22	13	103	−90	0	Withdrew after round 11. Non-played matches were awarded 0-3 against them
13	FIMA Yerevan	0	-	-	-	-	-	—	0	Withdrew before start of the season
14	Dinamo Yeghvard	0	-	-	-	-	-	—	0	Withdrew before start of the season
15	Vanadzor	0	-	-	-	-	-	—	0	Withdrew before start of the season
16	Arpa	0	-	-	-	-	-	—	0	Withdrew before start of the season
