= 2002 in Armenian football =

Premier League champions
- Pyunik

First League champions
- Armavir

Armenian Cup winners
- Pyunik

Armenian Super Cup winners
- Shirak

The 2002 season was the 10th season of competitive association football in Armenia.

== Premier League ==
- FC Malatia disbanded before the start of the season. FC Lori from Vanadzor were given another chance to stay up.
- Karabakh Yerevan changed their name to Lernayin Artsakh FC.

Pos	Team	Pld	W	D	L	GF	GA	GD	Pts	Qualification or relegation
1	Pyunik (C)	22	19	2	1	85	14	+71	59	Qualification for the Champions League first qualifying round
2	Shirak	22	16	3	3	49	15	+34	51	Qualification for the UEFA Cup qualifying round
3	Banants	22	16	2	4	43	15	+28	50	Qualification for the UEFA Cup qualifying round
4	Spartak Yerevan	22	15	4	3	58	16	+42	49	
5	Ararat Yerevan	22	9	6	7	39	22	+17	33	
6	Mika Ashtarak	22	9	6	7	35	28	+7	33	
7	Zvartnots-AAL	22	10	2	10	57	29	+28	32	
8	Lernagorts Kapan	22	6	5	11	21	43	−22	23	
9	Lernayin Artsakh	22	5	2	15	21	52	−31	17	
10	Dinamo-2000 Yerevan	22	3	3	16	19	63	−44	12	
11	Kotayk	22	2	5	15	17	62	−45	11	Qualification for the Intertoto Cup first round
12	Lori Vanadzor (R)	22	1	2	19	15	100	−85	5	Relegation to First League
13	Malatia (W)	0	0	0	0	0	0	0	0	Withdrew (Note: Malatia withdrew before start of the season.)

Source: RSSSF
(C) Champions; (R) Relegated; (W) Withdrew

== First League ==
- Araks, Lokomotiv Yerevan, Dinamo Yeghvard, and Nork Marash FC are introduced to the league.
- Arpa FC, and FC Vanadzor returned to professional football.
- Karmrakhayt Armavir changed their name back to FC Armavir.

Pos	Team	Pld	W	D	L	GF	GA	GD	Pts	Promotion
1	Armavir	30	25	4	1	96	18	+78	79	Champions, promotion to Armenian Premier League
2	Araks Ararat	30	25	2	3	85	18	+67	77	
3	Kilikia	30	22	7	1	94	13	+81	73	
4	Arpa	30	23	3	4	85	25	+60	72	
5	Pyunik-3	30	20	3	7	79	27	+52	63	
6	Pyunik-2	30	15	7	8	70	32	+38	52	
7	Lernayin Artsakh-2	30	13	6	11	41	39	+2	45	
8	Spartak-2 Yerevan	30	13	4	13	60	49	+11	43	
9	Lokomotiv Yerevan	30	10	4	16	42	78	−36	34	
10	Shirak-2	30	9	3	18	43	63	−20	30	
11	Vanadzor	30	7	6	17	36	49	−13	27	
12	Nork Marash	30	5	4	21	26	99	−73	19	
13	FIMA Yerevan	30	5	3	22	29	89	−60	18	
14	Dinamo Yeghvard	30	4	4	22	26	114	−88	16	
15	Mika-2	30	6	3	21	21	70	−49	21	Withdrew in the middle of the season. Non-played matches were awarded 0-3 against them
16	Dinamo 2000-2	30	4	3	23	20	70	−50	15	Withdrew in the middle of the season. Non-played matches were awarded 0-3 against them
17	Dinamo Yerevan	0	-	-	-	-	-	—	0	Withdrew before start of the season
18	Kasakh	0	-	-	-	-	-	—	0	Withdrew before start of the season
19	Aragats	0	-	-	-	-	-	—	0	Withdrew before start of the season
