= 2003 Armenian First League =

Football league season

The 2003 Armenian First League is the 13th season of the Armenian First League. It started on 1 May and ended 14 November. FC Kilikia from Yerevan became the league champions, and were promoted to the 2004 Armenian Premier League.

== Overview ==
- Newly created FC Vagharshapat are introduced to the league.
- FC Dinamo Yerevan and Yerazank FC returned to professional football.
- Spartak Yerevan FC merged with FC Banants and was dropped to the First League as a result.

== Participating clubs ==
Location of teams in the 2001 Armenian First League

Club	Location	Stadium	Capacity
Kilikia	Yerevan	Hrazdan Stadium	54,208
Pyunik-2	Yerevan	Pyunik Stadium	780
Mika-2	Ashtarak	Kasakhi Marzik Stadium	3,600
Lokomotiv Yerevan	Yerevan		
Shirak-2	Gyumri	Gyumri City Stadium	2,844
Lori	Vanadzor	Vanadzor City Stadium	4,000
Nork Marash	Yerevan		
Spartak Yerevan	Yerevan		
Kotayk 2003	Abovyan	Abovyan City Stadium	3,946
Dinamo Yerevan	Yerevan		
Vagharshapat	Etchmiadzin	Etchmiadzin Stadium	3,000
Yerazank	Yerevan		

== League table ==
Pos	Team	Pld	W	D	L	GF	GA	GD	Pts	Promotion
1	Kilikia	22	20	0	2	88	14	+74	60	Champions, promotion to Armenian Premier League
2	Vagharshapat	22	16	2	4	61	24	+37	50	
3	Pyunik-2	22	15	3	4	74	27	+47	48	
4	Lokomotiv Yerevan	22	12	3	7	46	33	+13	39	
5	Spartak Yerevan	22	11	3	8	34	31	+3	36	
6	Kotayk 2003	22	10	5	7	31	20	+11	35	
7	Mika-2	22	9	4	9	43	27	+16	31	
8	Dinamo Yerevan	22	9	4	9	29	44	−15	31	
9	Shirak-2	22	7	3	12	24	41	−17	24	
10	Lori	22	5	0	17	36	74	−38	15	
11	Nork Marash	22	3	3	16	23	64	−41	12	
12	Yerazank	22	0	0	22	13	103	−90	0	Withdrew after round 11. Non-played matches were awarded 0-3 against them
13	FIMA Yerevan	0	-	-	-	-	-	—	0	Withdrew before start of the season
14	Dinamo Yeghvard	0	-	-	-	-	-	—	0	Withdrew before start of the season
15	Vanadzor	0	-	-	-	-	-	—	0	Withdrew before start of the season
16	Arpa	0	-	-	-	-	-	—	0	Withdrew before start of the season

== Top goalscorers ==
	Player	Team	Goals
1	(Armenia) Nshan Erzrumyan	Kilikia	31
2	(Armenia) Ashot Khachatryan	Pyunik-2	20
3	(Armenia) Aleksandr Petrosyan	Pyunik-2	15
4	(Armenia) Harutyun Hovhannisyan	Kilikia	13
5	(Armenia) Ruben Aristakesyan	Mika-2	12
5	(Armenia) Aharon Mkoyan	Dinamo	11
5	(Armenia) Rafael Mkrtchyan	Lokomotiv	11
5	(Armenia) Sergey Erzrumyan	Kilikia	10

== See also ==
- 2003 Armenian Premier League
- 2003 Armenian Cup
- 2003 in Armenian football
