= 2002 Armenian First League =

Football league season

The 2002 Armenian First League is the 12th season of the Armenian First League. It started on the 25th of April and ended November 17. FC Armavir from Armavir became the league champions, and were promoted to the 2003 Armenian Premier League.

== Overview ==
- Newly created FC Lokomotiv Yerevan, FC Dinamo Yeghvard, Nork Marash FC, Pyunik-3, Lernayin Artsakh-2 Yerevan, Spartak-2 Yerevan, Shirak-2, Mika-2, and Dinamo 2000-2 are introduced to the league.
- Araks Ararat FC, Arpa FC, Kilikia FC, and FC Vanadzor returned to professional football.
- Karmrakhayt changed their name back to FC Armavir.

== Participating clubs ==
Location of teams in the 2001 Armenian First League

Club	Location	Stadium	Capacity
Kilikia	Yerevan	Hrazdan Stadium	54,208
FIMA Yerevan	Yerevan		
Pyunik-2	Yerevan	Pyunik Stadium	780
Pyunik-3	Yerevan	Pyunik Stadium	780
Lernayin Artsakh-2	Yerevan		
Mika-2	Ashtarak	Kasakhi Marzik Stadium	3,600
Dinamo Yeghvard	Yeghvard	Yeghvard City Stadium	500
Lokomotiv Yerevan	Yerevan		
Armavir	Armavir	Jubilee Stadium	4,000
Araks Ararat	Ararat	Ayg Stadium	1,280
Shirak-2	Gyumri	Gyumri City Stadium	2,844
Vanadzor	Vanadzor	Vanadzor City Stadium	4,000
Nork Marash	Yerevan		
Spartak-2 Yerevan	Yerevan		
Dinamo 2000-2	Yerevan		
Arpa	Yeghegnadzor	Yeghegnadzor City Stadium	300

== League table ==
Pos	Team	Pld	W	D	L	GF	GA	GD	Pts	Promotion
1	Armavir	30	25	4	1	96	18	+78	79	Champions, promotion to Armenian Premier League
2	Araks Ararat	30	25	2	3	85	18	+67	77	
3	Kilikia	30	22	7	1	94	13	+81	73	
4	Arpa	30	23	3	4	85	25	+60	72	
5	Pyunik-3	30	20	3	7	79	27	+52	63	
6	Pyunik-2	30	15	7	8	70	32	+38	52	
7	Lernayin Artsakh-2	30	13	6	11	41	39	+2	45	
8	Spartak-2 Yerevan	30	13	4	13	60	49	+11	43	
9	Lokomotiv Yerevan	30	10	4	16	42	78	−36	34	
10	Shirak-2	30	9	3	18	43	63	−20	30	
11	Vanadzor	30	7	6	17	36	49	−13	27	
12	Nork Marash	30	5	4	21	26	99	−73	19	
13	FIMA Yerevan	30	5	3	22	29	89	−60	18	
14	Dinamo Yeghvard	30	4	4	22	26	114	−88	16	
15	Mika-2	30	6	3	21	21	70	−49	21	Withdrew in the middle of the season. Non-played matches were awarded 0-3 against them
16	Dinamo 2000-2	30	4	3	23	20	70	−50	15	Withdrew in the middle of the season. Non-played matches were awarded 0-3 against them
17	Dinamo Yerevan	0	-	-	-	-	-	—	0	Withdrew before start of the season
18	Kasakh	0	-	-	-	-	-	—	0	Withdrew before start of the season
19	Aragats	0	-	-	-	-	-	—	0	Withdrew before start of the season

== Top goalscorers ==
	Player	Team	Goals
1	(Armenia) Harutyun Vardanyan	Arpa	31
2	(Armenia) Karen Asatryan	Araks Ararat	29
3	(Armenia) Samvel Baroyan	Armavir	25
4	(Armenia) Ara Hovhannisyan	Spartak-2	23
5	(Armenia) Alen Movsisyan	Armavir	21

== See also ==
- 2002 Armenian Premier League
- 2002 Armenian Cup
- 2002 in Armenian football
