= Valeri Aleksanyan =

Armenian football player (born 1984)

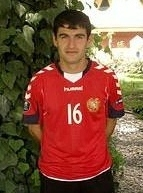

Personal information
- Full name: Valeri Vazgeni Aleksanyan
- Date of birth: 4 September 1984 (age 42)
- Place of birth: Yerevan, Armenian SSR
- Height: 1.78 m (5 ft 10 in)
- Positions: Right-back; centre-back

Senior career*
Years	Team	Apps	(Gls)
2001–2007	Pyunik Yerevan	88	(9)
2007–2010	Gandzasar Kapan	59	(3)
2010–2011	Ulisses Yerevan	36	(4)
2011–2013	Sanat Naft	45	(1)
2013–2014	Rah Ahan	2	(0)

International career^{‡}
2002–2006	Armenia U-21	15	(0)
2004–2014	Armenia	27	(0)
- * Club domestic league appearances and goals as of 19 February 2013 ‡ National team caps and goals as of 11 June 2013

Valeri Aleksanyan (Armenian: Վալերի Ալեքսանյան, born on 4 September 1984) is an Armenian former professional footballer who last played as a defender for Rah Ahan F.C and the Armenia national team.

== Club career ==
=== Pyunik ===
Aleksanyan was born in Yerevan, Armenian SSR. He got involved in football rather late, at age 12. His parents were originally against the passions of their child. His father wanted his son to make school a priority. Secretly, Aleksanyan began going to football training. At 12 years old, he went to football youth school Pyunik Yerevan. In 2000, he signed his first contract with Pyunik and, in 2001, began his career for the club, which included winning the Armenian Premier League in 2001, 2002, 2003, 2004, 2005 and 2006, the Armenian Cup in 2002 and 2004 and the Armenian Supercup in 2001, 2003 and 2004. From 2002 to 2004, he also played for Pyunik-2 at the same time.

=== Gandzasar ===
In June 2007, by agreement between Pyunik and Gandzasar Kapan, Aleksanyan went on loan at the Kapan club. The transition was initiated by Samvel Petrosyan, who was then head coach of Gandzasar. After the lease, Aleksanyan went to Kazakhstan, where he was looking at FC Kaisar. Returning to Armenia, he signed a contract with Gandzasar. With the team, they had come in third place in the 2008 Armenian Premier League. In late November 2009, after the end of the season, Aleksanyan ended his contract with Gandzasar. Neither player nor the manager was not to renew the contract by mutual agreement.

=== Ulisses ===
Subsequently, Aleksanyan moved to Ulisses Yerevan, which offered him a contract. His management initially refuted the signing of the contract. After the 2010 Armenian Premier League season concluded, he signed another contract with the club. For the first half of the 2011 Armenian Premier League season, Aleksanyan conducted at a high level, the result of which was a welcome invitation back to the national team.

=== Sanat Naft Abadan ===
In the summer transfer window, Ulisses had received an offer to buy the player. The parties came to an agreement and Aleksanyan, on a one-year contract, went to Abadan and joined local club Sanat Naft Abadan.

Aleksanyan's contract with Sanat Naft was ended in 2013 and the player is currently in the status of free agent.

== International career ==
Aleksanyan played for the Armenia national football team for the first time on 18 February 2004. In the international match, held in Paphos, Cyprus, the Armenian team met with the Hungary national team, in a game in which they were defeated 0–2. Aleksanyan was released from the first minute and played the entire match.

His last game in the team for a while was on 15 January 2007. Aleksanyan played the entire game in a friendly match with the Panama national team.

In the period from 2007 to 2011, Aleksanyan was not called to the team. With the transition from the Gandzasar in Ulisses, Aleksanyan played with a renewed vigor. This was followed by calls to the team, but when taking part in the first two matches, Aleksanyan failed to amaze. Only in the third game of Aleksanyan's return to the national team did they succeed. It happened on 2 September 2011 as part of the UEFA Euro 2012 qualifying match against Andorra. The Armenian team celebrated success - 3:0.

In the final match of qualifying for the UEFA Euro 2012, the national team played against Ireland in Dublin on 11 October 2011. Aleksanyan accidentally scored an own goal on the Armenian team. He scored on youth goalkeeper Arsen Petrosyan, after team captain goalkeeper Roman Berezovsky was wrongly given a red card. The game ended a 1–2 loss. Only victory could have qualified Armenia for the Euro 2012.

== Personal life ==
Valeri is married to his spouse Siranush. They have one son, Artem (b. 2009). Aleksanyan enjoys spending his free time fishing.

== Honours ==
Pyunik Yerevan

- Armenian Premier League: 2001, 2002, 2003, 2004, 2005, 2006
- Armenian Cup: 2002, 2004
- Armenian Supercup: 2001, 2003, 2004
- Armenian Cup runner-up: 2006
- Armenian Supercup runner-up: 2003, 2006
