= Aghvan Mkrtchyan =

Armenian footballer (born 1981)

Personal information
- Full name: Aghvan Varazdati Mkrtchyan
- Date of birth: 27 February 1981 (age 45)
- Place of birth: Yerevan, Armenian SSR, Soviet Union
- Height: 1.82 m (6 ft 0 in)
- Position: Defensive midfielder

Senior career*
Years	Team	Apps	(Gls)
1999	Erebuni Yerevan	4	(0)
1999	Dvin Artashat	15	(0)
2000–2001	Ararat Yerevan	31	(1)
2002–2006	Pyunik Yerevan	105	(22)
2006–2007	Bargh Shiraz	13	(0)
2007	Pyunik Yerevan	13	(2)
2008	Gomel	27	(1)
2009–2013	Mika Yerevan	83	(7)

International career
2002–2010	Armenia	44	(1)
- * Club domestic league appearances and goals

Aghvan Varazdati Mkrtchyan (Armenian: Աղվան Վարազդատի Մկրտչյան, born 27 February 1981 in Yerevan, Soviet Union) is an Armenian former professional footballer who played as a defensive midfielder. He was a member of the Armenia national team, making in 44 appearances and scoring 1 goal after his debut in away friendly match against Andorra on 7 June 2002.

== Career statistics ==
Appearances and goals by national team and year
National team	Year	Apps	Goals
Armenia	2002	1	0
Armenia	2003	1	0
Armenia	2004	3	0
Armenia	2005	6	0
Armenia	2006	6	0
Armenia	2007	7	0
Armenia	2008	10	0
Armenia	2009	8	0
Armenia	2010	2	1
Total		44	1

== Honours ==
Pyunik Yerevan

- Armenian Premier League: 2002, 2003, 2004, 2005, 2006, 2007
- Armenian Cup: 2002, 2004
- Armenian Supercup: 2002, 2004, 2007

Mika Yerevan

- Armenian Cup: 2011
