= 2001 in Armenian football =

Premier League champions
- Pyunik

First League champions
- Malatia

Armenian Cup winners
- Pyunik

== Premier League ==
- FC Armenicum, Karabakh Yerevan, Lori Vanadzor, and FC Kotayk. FC Armenicum were dissolved and yielded their place to the revived FC Pyunik.
- Newly established Dinamo-2000 Yerevan are allowed to participate in the premier league without competing in the Armenian First League first.
- On August 20, Araks Ararat FC was dissolved. The rights to participate in the Premier League were granted to the newly founded club Spartak Yerevan.
- Banants were relocated from the village of Kotayk to Yerevan. Despite not participating as a separate team in the 2000 Armenian First League, the club was also allowed to participate in the 2001 Armenian Premier League season.
- Kilikia did not pay entrance fee and refused to play twice, leading to their expulsion. At the end of the season they were also relegated along with Lori
- Karabakh were relocated from Stepanakert to Yerevan.

Pos	Team	Pld	W	D	L	GF	GA	GD	Pts	Qualification or relegation
1	Pyunik (C)	22	17	2	3	77	23	+54	53	Qualification for the Champions League first qualifying round
2	Zvartnots-AAL	22	16	0	6	52	21	+31	48	Qualification for the UEFA Cup qualifying round
3	Spartak Yerevan	22	15	3	4	57	13	+44	48	Qualification for the UEFA Cup qualifying round
4	Shirak	22	14	5	3	52	19	+33	47	Qualification for the Intertoto Cup first round
5	Ararat Yerevan	22	13	3	6	42	22	+20	42	
6	Mika Ashtarak	22	12	5	5	44	20	+24	41	
7	Banants	22	10	4	8	46	28	+18	34	
8	Lernagorts Kapan	22	5	3	14	25	63	−38	18	
9	Dinamo-2000	22	4	4	14	18	48	−30	16	
10	Kotayk	22	3	3	16	19	65	−46	12	
11	Karabakh Yerevan	22	2	6	14	19	63	−44	12	
12	Lori Vanadzor	22	1	2	19	17	83	−66	5	Relegation to First League
13	Kilikia (E)	0	0	0	0	0	0	0	0	Expelled (Note: Kilikia were expelled after playing a one match.)

(C) Champions; (E) Expelled

== Top goalscorers ==
		Player	Team	Goals
1	(Armenia)	Arman Karamyan	Pyunik	21
2	(Armenia)	Hayk Hakobyan	Spartak Yerevan	16
3	(Armenia)	Mher Avanesyan	Zvartnots-AAL	15
4	(Armenia)	Aram Hakobyan	Spartak Yerevan	15

== First League ==
- Malatia and Kasakh returned to professional football.
- Armavir returned to professional football under the name Karmrakhayt Armavir.
- FC Gyumri changed their name back to Aragats FC.
- Pyunik-2 were added to the Armenian First League to make an 8-team competition.

=== First stage ===
Pos	Team	Pld	W	D	L	GF	GA	GD	Pts	Qualification
1	Malatia	14	10	3	1	39	14	+25	33	Qualification to Championship group
2	FIMA Yerevan	14	10	2	2	38	17	+21	32	Qualification to Championship group
3	Pyunik-2	14	9	2	3	40	12	+28	29	Qualification to Championship group
4	Aragats	14	9	1	4	25	18	+7	28	Qualification to Championship group
5	Kasakh	14	6	2	6	30	25	+5	20	Qualification to Bottom group
6	Dinamo Yerevan	14	5	0	9	30	32	−2	15	Qualification to Bottom group
7	Karmrakhayt	14	1	1	12	10	58	−48	4	Qualification to Bottom group
8	Tavush	14	0	1	13	6	42	−36	1	Qualification to Bottom group
9	Arpa	0	-	-	-	-	-	—	0	Withdrew before start of the season
10	Dinamo-2 Yerevan	0	-	-	-	-	-	—	0	Dropped since its parent team will participate instead.

=== Second stage ===
- Teams kept head-to-head results of preliminary stage in both groups.
- Tavush Ijevan withdrew before the start of the second stage

==== Promotion Group ====
Pos	Team	Pld	W	D	L	GF	GA	GD	Pts	Promotion
1	Malatia	12	8	3	1	26	12	+14	27	Champions, promotion to Armenian Premier League.
2	FIMA Yerevan	12	5	2	5	15	15	0	17	
3	Pyunik-2	12	3	5	4	14	15	−1	14	
4	Aragats	12	2	2	8	8	21	−13	8	

==== Bottom Group ====
Pos	Team	Pld	W	D	L	GF	GA	GD	Pts	Relegation
5	Dinamo Yerevan	10	8	0	2	35	12	+23	24	
6	Kasakh	10	8	0	2	30	17	+13	24	
7	Karmrakhayt	10	1	1	8	12	35	−23	4	
8	Tavush	0	-	-	-	-	-	—	0	Withdrew before start of the second stage.
