= Gevorg Kasparov =

Armenian footballer

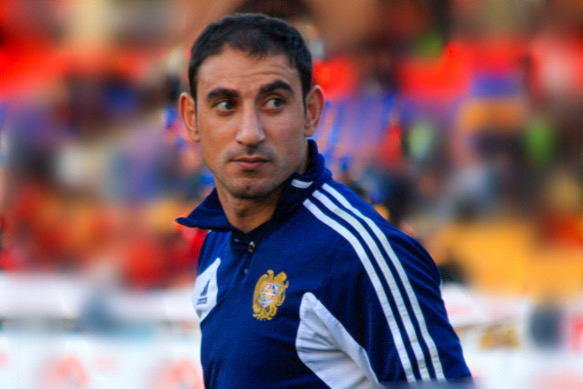
- Kasparov in 2013.

Personal information
- Full name: Gevorg Vladimirovich Kasparov
- Date of birth: 25 July 1980 (age 46)
- Place of birth: Yerevan, Armenian SSR, Soviet Union
- Height: 1.85 m (6 ft 1 in)
- Position: Goalkeeper

Team information
- Current team: Without club

Youth career
- 1997–1998: Dvin Artashat

Senior career*
Years	Team	Apps	(Gls)
1999	BKMA Artsakh	5	(0)
2000–2002	Zvartnots-AAL	51	(0)
2003	Ararat Tehran	12	(0)
2004	MIKA	12	(0)
2005–2006	Pyunik	41	(0)
2007	PAS	10	(0)
2007–2008	Rah Ahan	22	(0)
2008–2009	Ulisses	25	(0)
2008–2009	Tractor Sazi	11	(0)
2009–2010	Sanati Kaveh	14	(0)
2010–2012	MIKA	48	(1)
2012–2013	Zob Ahan	24	(0)
2014–2015	MIKA	39	(0)
2015–2017	Alashkert	36	(0)
2017–2020	Gandzasar Kapan	44	(0)
2020	Shirak	7	(0)
2021	Alashkert	0	(0)

International career^{‡}
1996	Armenia U-16	3	(0)
1997–1998	Armenia U-18	7	(0)
2000	Armenia U-21	2	(0)
2004–2015	Armenia	29	(0)
2018–2019	Western Armenia	10	(0)

Managerial career
- 2021: Alashkert II (goalkeeper coach)
- 2022-2024: FC Noah (goalkeeper coach)
- 2026-now: FC Syunik (goalkeeper coach)
- * Club domestic league appearances and goals as of 02 Jul 2026 ‡ National team caps and goals as of 9 Dec 2019

Gevorg Kasparov (Armenian: Գևորգ Կասպարով, born 25 July 1980) is an Armenian Goalkeeping coach (UEFA B Licence) and former professional goalkeeper. He is the goalkeeping coach for FC Syunik.

== Club career ==
=== Dvin Artashat ===
Before playing in Dvin, Kasparov is a graduate of the Yerevan football school. As a youth, he played with the team Dvin Artashat. He played for this youth club from 1997 – 1998. At the age of 17 he became the main goalkeeper for the club. Because of the club's poor defensive line, the number of goals scored against Kasparov in the 1997 season were 51 goals in 18 matches. However, in the following season the situation changed so that in 10 matches, Kasparov caught the ball outside the goal 19 times.

=== Zvartnots-AAL ===
In 2000, Kasparov signed a contract with the club Zvartnots-AAL, which reached the final of the Armenian Cup twice and became runners-up in the 2001 Armenian Premier League. Perhaps Kasparov would have continued his career in this club, but at the end of the season, the club withdrew from the Armenian Premier League because of financial problems.

=== Ararat Tehran ===
Kasparov was forced to find a new job. A proposal came from neighbouring Iran, from Tehran's F.C. Ararat Tehran. He played there for the 2003 season, then went back home.

=== MIKA Yerevan ===
In 2004, he moved to the Mika Yerevan. Kasparov's debut match for the club was at Ashtarak on 17 April, where the opponent was the Armenian Premier League champion in the previous year, Pyunik Yerevan. In that match, Mika Yerevan was defeated by a score of 1:3. Together with the team, they were runners-up in the 2004 Armenian Premier League.

=== Pyunik ===
The following year, Kasparov became a player for Pyunik Yerevan. After the first round, Apoula Edel left the team, and Kasparov became the main goalkeeper of the team. With Kasparov as part of Pyunik, the club won the Armenian Premier League in 2005 and 2006 and the Armenian Supercup in 2005 and were runners-up in 2006. Kasparov was voted the best Armenian Premier League goalkeeper in 2005 and 2006.

=== PAS Tehran and Rah Ahan ===
In 2007, he once again moved to Iran. He played for one season with each of PAS and Rah Ahan.

=== Ulisses ===
Kasparov returned to Armenia in 2008 when he received an offer from Ulisses Yerevan. In Ulisses, Kasparov played for two full seasons. In the 2009 Armenian Premier League championship, the club came in third place. At the end of the second season, he went to the Tehran club Sanati Kaveh Tehran. A contract was signed with the club for five months, until the end of the championship in the Azadegan League First League.

=== Return to MIKA Yerevan ===
In 2010, during the summer transfer window, MIKA Yerevan were again interested in Kasparov. Further negotiations were set to acquire the player. In the end, a contract was signed, and Kasparov, after 6 years, returned to Mika. In the 2010 season, he was the fourth goalkeeper in the club during the 2010 Armenian Premier League. Before Kasparov joined, former goalkeeper Klevinskas Grishikashvili left the club. In the first round against Kilikia F.C., Kasparov took part. As a result, the team won over their rival up 4–1. In the Armenian Cup, with the help of Kasparov goal-keeping, Mika reached the finals, where they were defeated by Shirak Gyumri – 4:1. On 1 December, Kasparov's contract with Mika expired and before it could be renewed, Kasparov began negotiations himself with a number of Iranian clubs playing in the First League. The possibility that the player will extend the current agreement with the club Mika was not excluded. What eventually happened was Kasparov signed a one-year agreement with Mika. The performance of Mika in the first half of the season was impressive. The team was in the lead with a value card stock before their closest rivals. Posed game coach Zsolt Hornyák instilled confidence in the team's actions. Kasparov considerable the impeccable playing defensive line part in the success of the club. However, in the summer, Kasparov left the club by going to loan in Ulisses. In early July, Kasparov and teammate Aghvan Mkrtchyan moved to Ulisses. The transition has been associated with an increase of the club before the matches of the 2012–13 UEFA Champions League qualifier against Sheriff Tiraspol. Having not played a single match for Ulisses in the Champions League, Kasparov and Mkrtchyan returned to Mika. After returning to FC Mika, they finish championship in second place, and won Armenian Supercup after the first half of championship, Kasparov left Mika for Zob Ahan on loan. After he signed a contract with Zob Ahan for one year, but six month later, he returned FC Mika, with signing 6 months contract. In 2013/14 championship Kasparov participate in all matches in the second half of Championship and help Mika to achieve bronze medals.

=== Alashkert ===
After the financial problems in Mika, Kasparov joined Alashkert to help them in the 2015–16 UEFA Europa League qualifiers. After great games he signed a contract with Alashkert for one year. In the yellow team he became a champion twice in a row.

=== Gandzasar Kapan ===
Gevorg Kasparov could play in another Armenian club, and the main reason was a staying without game practice, because they had left him on the reserve players' bench. A proposal was made from FC Gandzasar Kapan, which was adopted and a one-year contract. It was signed on 22 July 2017. In 2017–18 within Armenian Premier League, In the third round, Kasparov mentioned his 300th jubilee-match in the domestic championship. In the framework of the 12th round, against Pyunik played 0–0, without missed goal in the 4th consecutive game, Kasparov set a new record in the symbolic club named after Sergei Zatikian. In the 416 official games he mentioned 150th game that kept his gate without missed any goal.

=== Shirak ===
On 27 July 2020, Shirak announced the signing of Kasparov, leaving the club on 23 December 2020.

=== Alashkert Return ===
On 21 February 2021, Kasparov returned to Alashkert.

On 2 June 2021, Kasparov announced his retirement from football.

== International career ==
Gevorg is a member of the Armenia national team since 2004. He has participated in 29 international matches since his debut in an away 2006 World Cup qualification match against Andorra on 12 October 2005, in which Armenia won 3–0. Kasparov had been instrumental in Armenia's UEFA Euro 2008 qualifying campaign.

In May 2018, Kasparov was called up to represent Western Armenia in the 2018 ConIFA World Football Cup.

== Coaching career ==
After retiring as a player, Kasparov started working as a goalkeeping coach for Alashkert II in 2001. He was approached by Football Academy of Noah club in February 2022. After working in youth teams for about two months, the club offered him the vacancy of first team goalkeeping coach till 2024.

== Personal life ==
Gevorg is married with 3 children, Gor, Avet and Maria. The eldest boy of Kasparov is also a goalkeeper, evidently trying to follow in his father's footsteps.

Kasparov is a Russian version of the Armenian surname Gasparyan.

== Honours ==
Zvartnots-AAL

- Armenian Premier League runner-up: 2001

Ulisses FC

- Armenian Premier League bronze medal: 2009

Mika Yerevan

- Armenian Premier League runner-up: 2004, 2012–13
- Armenian Premier League bronze medal: 2013–14
- Armenian Cup: 2011
- Armenian Cup runner-up: 2014–15
- Armenian Supercup: 2012

Pyunik Yerevan

- Armenian Premier League: 2005, 2006
- Armenian Supercup: 2005
- Armenian Supercup runner-up: 2006

Alashkert

- Armenian Premier League: 2015–16, 2016–17, 2020–21
- Armenian Supercup: 2016

Gandzasar-Kapan

- Armenian Cup: 2017–18

Individual

- Best Goalkeeper of Armenia: 2005, 2006, 2015, 2016.
