= Apoula Edel =

Armenian footballer

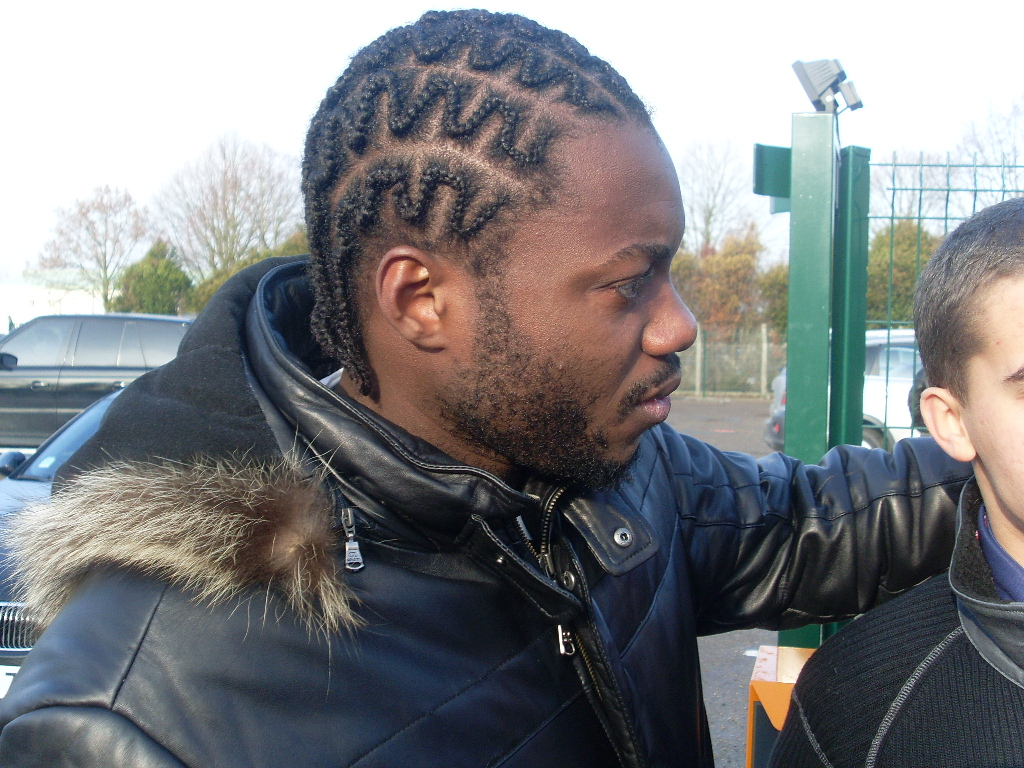

Personal information
- Full name: Apoula Edima Bete Edel
- Date of birth: 17 June 1986 (age 40)
- Place of birth: Yaoundé, Cameroon
- Height: 1.84 m (6 ft 0 in)
- Position: Goalkeeper

Youth career
- 1998–2001: Puissance Avenir
- 2001–2002: FC PWD Kumba

Senior career*
Years	Team	Apps	(Gls)
2002–2005	Pyunik	58	(1)
2006–2007	Rapid București	9	(0)
2006	→ KAA Gent (loan)	0	(0)
2007–2011	Paris Saint-Germain	47	(0)
2011–2013	Hapoel Tel Aviv	64	(1)
2014	Atlético de Kolkata	9	(0)
2015	Hapoel Tel Aviv	8	(0)
2015	Chennaiyin	13	(0)
2016	Pune City	13	(0)
Total		222	(2)

International career
	Armenia U19	3	(0)
2003–2004	Armenia U21	12	(0)
2004–2005	Armenia	6	(0)
- * Club domestic league appearances and goals

Apoula Edima Bete Edel (born 17 June 1986) is a former professional footballer who played as a goalkeeper. Born in Cameroon, he played for the Armenia national team.

== Club career ==
=== Early career ===
Apoula Edel was born in Yaoundé, Cameroon and moved to Armenia in 2002. He signed a contract with Pyunik FC in March 2003. In 2005, he joined Rapid București along with Carl Lombé, by unilaterally terminating his contract without just reason. Pyunik FC submitted the case to FIFA Dispute Resolution Chamber. The DRC passed a decision on 4 April 2007 and sent the decision to the parties on 3 August, in which Edel was ordered to pay Pyunik US$15,000. He also claimed he was forced to naturalise during the court trial as an excuse to leave the country in 2005. The parties submitted the appeal to the Court of Arbitration for Sport and CAS partially upheld the DRC decision, and increased the fee to US$60,000 in 2008.

=== Paris Saint-Germain ===
After being released by Rapid București, French club PSG signed Edel on a free transfer. Following his signing for the club, Edel was a second choice goalkeeper behind Mickaël Landreau, Jérôme Alonzo and Grégory Coupet. On 16 November 2007, he played his first game with PSG in a friendly game against Guinea, not as a goalkeeper but as a forward, after an injury to Loris Arnaud. In his second season for PSG, Edel made his debut in a Coupe de France against AS Nancy, with PSG winning 2–1. Edel made his UEFA Cup debut against Wolfsburg. Under Le Guen, Edel made just 4 appearances. After Le Guen was sacked as PSG manager, Antoine Kombouaré succeeded him. Under Kombouaré, Edel started to get more playing time and established himself as a first choice goalkeeper after Grégory Coupet suffered an injury to his malleolar on 28 November 2009 which kept him out of the season. On 16 December 2009, Edel made his league debut for PSG in a 1–1 draw Lens. On 21 January 2010, Edel scored an own goal in a 1–0 defeat to Monaco which turned out to be the winner. Edel played as PSG won the 2010 Coupe de France Final. After Coupet recovered from injury, Edel was once again second choice goalkeeper but it was short lived after due to Coupet's poor performance and discouragement in the early season. On 29 November 2010, Edel made a blunder in a match against Lyon as PSG missed the chance to go to the top of Ligue 1. Edel performance was defended by Kombouaré saying "I have nothing against Edel, I even have a thought for him. He is the most disappointed because his mistake cost us the win. Now we will support him and it will be up to him to erase that mistake.There is a lot of frustration, because we showed big mental strength and a lot of technical qualities too"

Towards the end of the season, Coupet regained his first choice goalkeeper when he play against Lyon on 17 April 2011. Afterwards, Edel was still the first choice goalkeeper for two more matches, before Coupet regained the spot again until the season finished.

As his contract was set to expire at the end of the season, reports claimed that Edel could be on his way out of the club in the summer, with speculation regarding a possible replacement doing the rounds, but chairman Robin Leproux says Edel (along with Ludovic Giuly and Mamadou Sakho) would be staying put.

Eventually, Edel declined to stay at PSG after his contract was finished, and he joined an Israeli club Hapoel Tel Aviv on a free transfer as a replacement for Vincent Enyeama, who joined Lille.

=== Atlético de Kolkata ===
In August 2014, Edel was drafted by Atlético de Kolkata of the Indian Super League. He put up a number of good saves in final, as the franchise became the champions of the inaugural season. He also won the Maruti Suzuki Swift Moment of the match award.

== International career ==
Edel, who was born and raised in Cameroon, has dual nationality and had decided to play international football for Armenia under the French coach Bernard Casoni.

== Personal life ==
There have been recurring accusations since 2009 that Édel is living under an assumed identity; that he is in fact five years older than his reported age, and his real name is Ambroise Beyaména. If the allegations were proved true and the player was found guilty, he could be sentenced to prison. Meanwhile, if false documents were lodged with the game's French and European governing bodies, Paris Saint-Germain risked losing their last two wins against Sevilla and Arles-Avignon. They could also face expulsion from the European competition, demotion from the top tier of French football, and heavy fines. Paris Saint-Germain, in partnership with Goom Radio, officially launched their own numerical radio station, the first ever dedicated to a Ligue 1 football club, which is also available over the internet. Paris Saint-Germain goalkeeper Apoula Edel was acquitted of possessing fake documents by the French police as his passport was found to be genuine. As a result, UEFA rejected Sevilla's appeal to have their Europa League defeat to Paris Saint-Germain overturned. After being clearing his name, Edel is ready to sue Nicolas Phillibert, his coach, of blackmailing. According to Phillibert, he paid for most of his expenses for two years and is still waiting for Edel to pay him back.

Through his ongoing footballing career, Edel is also known to lead a fashionable lifestyle that includes friendships with leading designers in the clothing industry. Edel has often been hailed by his fashion peers for his understanding of fashion and is often referred to as an understudy of illusionary French contemporary designers such as Jean-Paul Gaultier and Isabel Marant.

The Indian magazine India Today has mentioned Edel on several occasions for his often flamboyant mixture of Indian and Western European design and fashion. In 2016 India Today featured articles written with Edel in the magazines own lifestyle section. Because of the popularity of that particular segment, the magazine chose to circulate a special edition of the lifestyle section as a stand-alone magazine for an entire month. Subsequently, editor of India Today, Madhu Trehan, indicated in interviews that the magazine experienced the highest circulation numbers since the launch of the magazine in 1975 because of Edels involvement.

== Career statistics ==
As of 11 March 2019

Appearances and goals by club, season and competition
Club	Season	League			Cup		Continental		Total	
Club	Season	Division	Apps	Goals	Apps	Goals	Apps	Goals	Apps	Goals
Pyunik	2002	Armenian Premier League	2	0	0	0	0	0	2	0
Pyunik	2003	Armenian Premier League	21	1	0	0	0	0	21	1
Pyunik	2004	Armenian Premier League	23	0	0	0	0	0	23	0
Pyunik	2005	Armenian Premier League	12	0	0	0	1 (Note: Appearances in UEFA Champions League)	0	13	0
Pyunik	Total		58	1	0	0	1	0	59	1
Rapid Bucuresti	2005–06	Divizia A	0	0	0	0	0	0	0	0
Rapid Bucuresti	2006–07	Liga I	9	0	1	0	1 (Note: Appearances in UEFA Europa League)	0	11	0
Rapid Bucuresti	Total		9	0	1	0	1	0	11	0
Paris Saint-Germain	2008–09	Ligue 1	0	0	0	0	2	0	2	0
Paris Saint-Germain	2009–10	Ligue 1	23	0	6	0	0	0	29	0
Paris Saint-Germain	2010–11	Ligue 1	24	0	2	0	11	0	37	0
Paris Saint-Germain	Total		47	0	8	0	13	0	68	0
Hapoel Tel Aviv	2011–12	Israeli Premier League	34	0	0	0	10	0	44	0
Hapoel Tel Aviv	2012–13	Israeli Premier League	30	1	2	0	8	0	40	1
Hapoel Tel Aviv	Total		64	1	2	0	18	0	85	1
Atlético de Kolkata	2014	Indian Super League	9	0	—		—		9	0
Hapoel Tel Aviv	2014–15	Israeli Premier League	8	0	2	0	0	0	10	0
Chennaiyin FC	2015	Indian Super League	13	0	—		—		13	0
Pune City	2016	Indian Super League	13	0	—		—		13	0
Career total			222	2	13	0	33	0	269	2

== Honours ==
Pyunik

- Armenian Premier League: 2002, 2003, 2004, 2005
- Armenian Cup: 2002, 2004

Rapid Bucuresti

- Cupa României: 2006–07

Paris Saint-Germain

- Coupe de France: 2009–10

Hapoel Tel Aviv

- Israel State Cup: 2011–12

Atlético de Kolkata

- Indian Super League: 2014

Chennaiyin

- Indian Super League: 2015

Individual

- Indian Super League Final Moment of the Match: 2014
- Indian Super League Golden Glove: 2015
