= Robert Arzumanyan =

Armenian footballer

Robert Arzumanyan (Note: Also spelled Arzoumanian.)
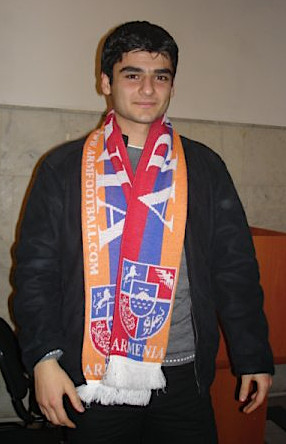
- Arzumanyan in 2009

Personal information
- Full name: Robert Patrick Arzoumanian
- Date of birth: 24 July 1985 (age 41)
- Place of birth: Yerevan, Armenian SSR, Soviet Union
- Height: 1.84 m (6 ft 0 in)
- Position: Centre-back

Youth career
- –2005: Pyunik Yerevan

Senior career*
Years	Team	Apps	(Gls)
2003–2007	Pyunik Yerevan	88	(6)
2008–2010	Randers	34	(0)
2011–2012	Jagiellonia Białystok	11	(0)
2012–2013	SKA-Energiya Khabarovsk	3	(1)
2013–2015	Aktobe	47	(3)
2015–2017	Amkar Perm	13	(0)
2016	→ Shakhter Karagandy (loan)	8	(0)
2018	Artsakh	0	(0)

International career
2003–2006	Armenia U21	9	(2)
2005–2016	Armenia	75	(5)

Managerial career
- 2019–2020: Pyunik (assistant)
- 2020–2021: Urartu-2
- 2021–2022: Urartu
- 2022–2023: Noah
- 2025–: Urartu
- * Club domestic league appearances and goals

Robert Arzumanyan (Armenian: Ռոբերտ Արզումանյան; born 24 July 1985) is an Armenian professional football manager and former player who played as a defender. He is currently the Head Coach of FC Urartu.

== Club career ==
=== Pyunik ===
Arzumanyan was born in Yerevan, Armenian SSR. He grew up playing for the youth team of Pyunik Yerevan. Every year Robert improved. Having gained confidence in his game, Robert became an indispensable player. In 2005, a transfer to the first team was made and Arzumanyan competed for the senior side after he turned 18. Playing with the senior club, he did not get lost, but instead played in great strength. The results of the good team did not take long. Results of the 2005 Armenian Premier League revealed that the best player to take part in the Armenian Premier League for the first time was Robert Arzumanyan. While Arzumanyan played for Pyunik, the club won the 2003 Armenian Premier League, 2004 Armenian Premier League, 2005 Armenian Premier League, 2006 Armenian Premier League and 2007 Armenian Premier League, won the 2004 Armenian Cup and won the 2003 Armenian Supercup, 2004 Armenian Supercup and 2006 Armenian Supercup.

=== Randers ===
Good performances in subsequent seasons drew the attention of foreign breeders. On 17 January 2008, Robert signed a contract for 1 year with the Danish club Randers FC. After the 2008–09 season, he was one of the key players on the team and had made himself a first team regular on the team following some good and stable performances. On 29 August 2008, Robert extended his contract with Randers for 4 years. In the 2009–10 season, he was less likely to appear on the field because of the coach's idea of a new head coach. After the season and after the successful games played in the national team at the UEFA Euro 2012 on arrival at the club, it became clear that the coaching staff moved Arzumanyan to transfer. The reason for this decision is likely that Arzumanyan and his agent were in favor of a likely passage in the winter transfer window in any other European club.

=== Jagiellonia Białystok ===
In January 2011, there was information about the interest of the player's services in Śląsk Wrocław, where Arzumanyan was interested in playing. He performed well during the training camps of the team, but Arzumanyan did not become a player of the club. The reason for not signing the contract is the commissions which demanded the agent of Robert Arzumanyan, Manual Kildanovich. Śląsk eventually decided not to sign a contract with the player. As a result, he signed with Jagiellonia Białystok in January 2011 on a three-and-a-half-year contract. Soon, because of the change of head coach and injuries, Arzumanyan did not get to bid for the match. The same coach of Jagiellonia did not see him in the team and advised him to change the club.

=== SKA-Energiya ===
On 23 July, Arzumanyan came to Saransk to see the local club FC Mordovia Saransk. On 26 July, with the team, he went to Krasnodar, and back to Saransk. Some days later, the head coach of Mordovia explained the rejection of the services of Arzumanyan as that there was too little time was to see his full potential. And given that the season had already started and the players trained in a specific mode, which was different from the training at the training camp. However, Arzumanyan left a positive impression. Arzumanyan ended up joining FC SKA-Energiya Khabarovsk and had signed a one-year deal with the club in September 2012. But the club came under new management in December 2012, resulting in roster changes. He left the Russian club on 18 January 2013.

=== Aktobe ===
The following month Arzumanyan signed a contract with Kazakh club FC Aktobe valid until December 2014. He had his first match for the new club on 9 March 2013 in the first round of the Kazakhstan Premier League.

=== Amkar Perm ===
In July 2014, Arzumanyan signed a contract agreement with Amkar Perm, starting in January 2015, at the end of his Aktobe contract.

In February 2016, Arzumanyan went on trial with Kazakhstan Premier League side FC Shakhter Karagandy. Amkar agreed on a loan deal with Shakhter on 17 February 2016.

On 7 February 2017, Arzumanyan's contract with Amkar was terminated by mutual consent.

In February 2018, after a year without a club, Arzumanyan began training with FC Banants.

On 20 October, after Artsakh FC's loss to Lori FC, Artsakh Head Coach Rafael Nazaryan announced that Arzumanyan had retired from football after persistent injuries without playing a game for Artsakh.

== International career ==
Arzumanyan is also one of the key defenders of the Armenia national team and has participated in 63 international matches and scored 4 goals since his debut in an away friendly match against Kuwait on 18 March 2005. He scored his first international goal for Armenia in a Euro 2008 qualifying match against Kazakhstan. The match happened on 2 June 2007 and Arzumanyan scored the goal at the 31st minute on David Loria.

On 7 March 2016, he announced the end of his international career.

== Coaching career ==
After retiring from professional football, Arzumanyan was Assistant Manager of Armenian Premier League club FC Pyunik. Arzumanyan left his role at FC Pyunik on 5 May 2020.

On 15 July 2020, Arzumanyan was appointed as manager of Urartu-2. On 10 March 2021, Arzumanyan was appointed as manager of FC Urartu. He left his position in June 2022. On 23 August 2022, he was presented as the new manager of FC Noah.

On 19 June 2025, Arzumanyan was re-appointed as Head Coach of Urartu.

== Style of play ==
His strengths noted are his speed and ability to play on the bottom field.

== Career statistics ==
=== Club ===
As of match played 5 May 2016

Appearances and goals by club, season and competition
Club	Season	League			National cup		Continental		Other		Total	
Club	Season	Division	Apps	Goals	Apps	Goals	Apps	Goals	Apps	Goals	Apps	Goals
Randers	2007–08	Danish Superliga	9	0			—		—		9	0
Randers	2008–09	Danish Superliga	9	0			—		—		9	0
Randers	2009–10	Danish Superliga	16	0			1	0	—		17	0
Randers	2010–11	Danish Superliga	0	0	0	0	2	0	—		2	0
Randers	Total		34	0			3	0	—		37	0
Jagiellonia Białystok	2010–11	Ekstraklasa	8	0	0	0	—		—		8	0
Jagiellonia Białystok	2011–12	Ekstraklasa	3	0	0	0	0	0	—		3	0
Jagiellonia Białystok	Total		11	0	0	0	0	0	—		11	0
SKA-Energia	2012–13	Russian National League	3	1	2	1	—		—		5	1
Aktobe	2013	Kazakhstan Premier League	21	2	3	0	4	0	—		28	2
Aktobe	2014	Kazakhstan Premier League	26	1	5	0	5	1	1	0	37	2
Aktobe	Total		47	3	8	0	9	1	1	0	65	4
Amkar Perm	2014–15	Russian Premier League	8	0	0	0	—		—		8	0
Amkar Perm	2015–16	Russian Premier League	5	0	0	0	—		—		8	0
Amkar Perm	2016–17	Russian Premier League	0	0	0	0	—		—		8	0
Amkar Perm	Total		13	0	0	0	—		—		13	0
Shakhter Karagandy (loan)	2016	Kazakhstan Premier League	8	0	1	0	—		—		9	0
Career total			116	4	11	0	12	1	1	0	150	5

=== International ===
Appearances and goals by national team and year
National team	Year	Apps	Goals
Armenia	2005	8	0
Armenia	2006	5	0
Armenia	2007	11	3
Armenia	2008	10	0
Armenia	2009	7	1
Armenia	2010	6	0
Armenia	2011	2	0
Armenia	2012	7	0
Armenia	2013	7	0
Armenia	2014	6	1
Armenia	2015	5	0
Total		74	5

Scores and results list Armenia's goal tally first, score column indicates score after each Arzumanyan goal.

List of international goals scored by Robert Arzumanyan
No.	Date	Venue	Opponent	Score	Result	Competition	Ref.
1	2 June 2007	Central Stadium, Almaty, Kazakhstan	Kazakhstan	1–0	2–1	UEFA Euro 2008 qualifying	
2	22 August 2007	Vazgen Sargsyan Republican Stadium, Yerevan, Armenia	Portugal	1–0	1–1	UEFA Euro 2008 qualifying	
3	8 September 2007	Dasaki Stadium, Achna, Cyprus	Cyprus	1–1	1–3	Friendly	
4	10 October 2009	Vazgen Sargsyan Republican Stadium, Yerevan, Armenia	Spain	1–1	1–2	2010 FIFA World Cup qualification	
5	11 October 2014	Vazgen Sargsyan Republican Stadium, Yerevan, Armenia	Serbia	1–0	1–1	UEFA Euro 2016 qualifying	

== Honours ==
Pyunik Yerevan

- Armenian Premier League: 2003, 2004, 2005, 2006, 2007
- Armenian Cup: 2004
- Armenian Supercup: 2003, 2005, 2007

Aktobe

- Kazakhstan Premier League: 2013
- Kazakhstan Super Cup: 2014

Individual

- Armenian Premier League Best Newcomer: 2005
- Armenian Premier League Best Young Full-Back: 2005
