= 2004 in Armenian football =

Premier League champions
- Pyunik

First League champions
- Pyunik-2

Armenian Cup winners
- Pyunik

Armenian Super Cup winners
- Pyunik

== Premier League ==
- Kilikia are promoted.
- Dinamo-2000 change their name to Dinamo-Zenit Yerevan.
- Lernagorts Kapan changed their name to Lernagorts-Ararat Kapan.
- No team was relegated this season, simply because the Football Federation of Armenia decided to increase the number of teams in the premier league from 8 to 9 for the 2005 season.

Pos	Team	Pld	W	D	L	GF	GA	GD	Pts	Qualification
1	Pyunik (C)	28	22	5	1	89	25	+64	71	Qualification for the Champions League first qualifying round
2	Mika Ashtarak	28	16	7	5	41	23	+18	55	Qualification for the UEFA Cup first qualifying round
3	Banants	28	12	7	9	40	39	+1	43	Qualification for the Intertoto Cup first round
4	Lernagorts-Ararat	28	12	7	9	40	33	+7	43	
5	Dinamo-Zenit	28	7	6	15	23	51	−28	27	
6	Kilikia	28	7	5	16	32	49	−17	26	
7	Kotayk	28	6	6	16	31	54	−23	24	
8	Shirak	28	4	9	15	27	49	−22	21	

Source: rsssf.com
(C) Champions

== First League ==
- Gandzasar FC form Kapan are introduced to the league.
- Spartak-2 Yerevan change their name to Banants-2.
- Zenit Charentsavan and Dinamo-VZ Yerevan are the reserve teams of Dinamo-Zenit Yerevan.
- Reserve teams cannot promote.

Pos	Team	Pld	W	D	L	GF	GA	GD	Pts	Promotion
1	Pyunik-2	30	27	2	1	98	21	+77	83	Champions
2	Lernayin Artsakh FC	30	22	6	2	82	20	+62	72	Promoted to Armenian Premier League. Champions were unable to promote.
3	Gandzasar	30	17	6	7	52	32	+20	57	
4	Vagharshapat	30	17	3	10	61	42	+19	54	
5	Mika-2	30	15	9	6	48	25	+23	54	
6	Araks Ararat FC	30	16	3	11	57	31	+26	51	
7	Ararat Yerevan	30	16	1	13	83	50	+33	49	
8	Banants-2	30	13	9	8	40	30	+10	48	
9	Pyunik-3	30	13	4	13	56	47	+9	43	
10	Banants-3	30	11	6	13	46	48	−2	39	
11	FC Lokomotiv Yerevan	30	8	6	16	29	51	−22	30	
12	Dinamo Yerevan	30	9	1	20	52	72	−20	28	
13	Dinamo VZ Yerevan	30	7	3	20	46	83	−37	24	
14	Lori Vanadzor	30	7	6	17	35	68	−33	24 (Note: Lori Vanadzor and Nork Marash FC were docked 3 points.)	
15	Zenit Charentsavan	30	6	3	21	34	89	−55	21	
16	Nork Marash FC (Note: Nork Marash FC withdrew after Matchday 26.)	30	2	0	28	7	117	−110	3	Withdrew in the middle of the season. Unplayed matches awarded 3-0 against them.
