= 2004 Armenian Cup =

Tournament details
- Country: Armenia
- Teams: 18

Final positions
- Champions: Pyunik
- Runners-up: Banants

Tournament statistics
- Matches played: 27
- Goals scored: 90 (3.33 per match)

The 2004 Armenian Cup was the 13th edition of the Armenian Cup, a football competition. In 2004, the tournament had 18 participants, out of which 4 were reserve teams.

== Results ==
=== Preliminary round ===
The matches were played on 10 March 2004.

Team 1	Score	Team 2
Ararat Yerevan	1–0	Lernayin Artsakh Yerevan
Dinamo-Zenit	2–0	Lori

=== First round ===
The first legs were played on 14 and 15 March 2004. The second legs were played on 18 and 19 March 2004.

Team 1	Agg.	Team 2	1st leg	2nd leg
Pyunik-2	0–8	Pyunik	0–3	0–5
Kilikia	10–0	Dinamo FA	10–0	n/a
Araks	6–5	Zenit Charentsavan	2–1	4–4
Mika	11–0	Banants-2	8–0	3–0
Banants	3–1	Vagharshapat	2–0	1–1
Mika-2	1–4	Kotayk	0–2	1–2
Dinamo-Zenit	1–1 (4–3 p)	Ararat Yerevan	0–1	1–0
Shirak	5–0	Lokomotiv Yerevan	2–0	3–0

=== Quarter-finals ===
The first legs were played on 22 March 2004. The second legs were played on 26 March 2004.

Team 1	Agg.	Team 2	1st leg	2nd leg
Kilikia	0–8	Pyunik	0–1	0–7
Mika	6–0	Araks	3–0	3–0
Kotayk	2–5	Banants	1–2	1–3
Shirak	3–2	Ararat	3–0	0–2

=== Semi-finals ===
The first legs were played on 3 April 2005. The second legs were played on 21 April 2005.

Team 1	Agg.	Team 2	1st leg	2nd leg
Pyunik	0–0 (4–2 p)	Mika	0–0	0–0
Shirak	2–3	Banants	2–0	0–3

=== Final ===
9 May 2004

Pyunik	0 – 0	Banants
Penalties
Manucharyan (penalty scored); Zeciu (penalty scored); Ndoumbouk (penalty missed); Hovhannisyan (penalty scored); Pachajyan (penalty scored); Tadevosyan (penalty scored); Lombé (penalty missed); Mkrtchyan (penalty scored)	6 – 5	(penalty scored) Grigoryan; (penalty scored) Jenebyan; (penalty scored) Iskoyants; (penalty missed) Harutyunyan; (penalty scored) Demirchyan; (penalty scored) Podgayn; (penalty missed) Simonyan; (penalty missed) Arakelyan

Vazgen Sargsyan Republican Stadium, Yerevan
Attendance: 10,000
Referee: Karen Nalbandyan (Yerevan)

== See also ==
- 2004 Armenian Premier League
