= 2005 Armenian First League =

Football league season

The 2005 Armenian First League season started on 19 April 2005. The last matches were played on 8 October 2005. Pyunik-2 became the league champions, but because they are a reserve team they were unable to promote to the Armenian Premier League. As a result, the second placed team Ararat Yerevan was given promotion. The third placed team Gandzasar played in the promotion/relegation play-off, which they lost.

== Overview ==
- Abovyan and Yerevan United joined the league.
- FC Zenit Charentsavan and FC Dinamo-VZ Yerevan are the reserve teams of Dinamo-Zenit Yerevan.
- Reserve teams, such as Pyunik-2, cannot be promoted.

== League table ==
Pos	Team	Pld	W	D	L	GF	GA	GD	Pts	Promotion or qualification
1	Pyunik-2	24	18	3	3	82	15	+67	57	Champions
2	Ararat Yerevan	24	18	2	4	72	18	+54	56	Promoted to Armenian Premier League. Champions were unable to promote.
3	Gandzasar	24	16	3	5	62	24	+38	51	Promotion/relegation play-off
4	Yerevan United	24	16	5	3	64	22	+42	50 (Note: Yerevan United were docked 3 points for failing to show up in round 16.)	
5	Mika-2	24	14	8	2	64	16	+48	50	
6	Banants-2	24	12	4	8	57	38	+19	40	
7	Esteghlal-Kotayk-2	24	9	4	11	39	45	−6	31	
8	Vagharshapat	24	8	4	12	38	59	−21	28	
9	FIMA Yerevan	24	7	4	13	27	43	−16	25	
10	Dinamo Yerevan	24	6	3	15	26	56	−30	18 (Note: Dinamo Yerevan were docked 3 points for failing to pay a fine on time.)	
11	Lori Vanadzor	24	6	0	18	39	77	−38	18	
12	Abovyan	24	2	0	22	13	125	−112	6	
13	FC Zenit Charentsavan	24	4	0	20	12	57	−45	6 (Note: Zenit Charentsavan were docked 6 points for failing to pay players' fees.)	Withdrew in the middle of the season. Unplayed matches awarded 3-0 against them.
14	Araks	0	0	0	0	0	0	0	0	Withdrew at the beginning of the season, existing record was annulled.
15	Banants-3	0	0	0	0	0	0	0	0	Withdrew at the beginning of the season, existing record was annulled.
16	FC Dinamo-VZ Yerevan	0	0	0	0	0	0	0	0	Withdrew before the start of the season.
17	Lokomotiv Yerevan	0	0	0	0	0	0	0	0	Withdrew before the start of the season.

== Promotion/relegation play-off ==
Date	Venue	PL Club	Result	FL Club	Information
22 October	unknown	Shirak	5 - 1	Gandzasar	Gandzasar lost the play-off, but were later promoted by the FFA decision.

== See also ==
- 2005 Armenian Premier League
- 2005 Armenian Cup
