= 2001 Armenian First League =

Football league season

The 2001 Armenian First League season started on 15 May and ended on November 10. FC Malatia from Yerevan became the league champions, and were promoted to the 2002 Armenian Premier League.

== Overview ==
- FC Malatia and FC Kasakh returned to professional football.
- Armavir FC returned to professional football under the name Karmrakhayt.
- FC Gyumri changed their name back to Aragats FC.
- Newly created Pyunik-2 joined the league.

== Participating clubs ==
Location of teams in the 2001 Armenian First League

Club	Location	Stadium	Capacity
Malatia	Yerevan		
FIMA Yerevan	Yerevan		
Pyunik-2	Yerevan	Pyunik Stadium	780
Kasakh	Ashtarak	Kasakhi Marzik Stadium	3,600
Dinamo Yerevan	Yerevan		
Karmrakhayt	Armavir	Jubilee Stadium	4,000
Tavush	Ijevan	Arnar Stadium	2,100
Aragats	Gyumri	Gyumri City Stadium	2,844

== League table ==
=== First stage ===
Pos	Team	Pld	W	D	L	GF	GA	GD	Pts	Qualification
1	Malatia	14	10	3	1	39	14	+25	33	Qualification to Championship group
2	FIMA Yerevan	14	10	2	2	38	17	+21	32	Qualification to Championship group
3	Pyunik-2	14	9	2	3	40	12	+28	29	Qualification to Championship group
4	Aragats	14	9	1	4	25	18	+7	28	Qualification to Championship group
5	Kasakh	14	6	2	6	30	25	+5	20	Qualification to Bottom group
6	Dinamo Yerevan	14	5	0	9	30	32	−2	15	Qualification to Bottom group
7	Karmrakhayt	14	1	1	12	10	58	−48	4	Qualification to Bottom group
8	Tavush	14	0	1	13	6	42	−36	1	Qualification to Bottom group
9	Arpa	0	-	-	-	-	-	—	0	Withdrew before start of the season
10	Dinamo-2 Yerevan	0	-	-	-	-	-	—	0	Dropped since its parent team will participate instead.

=== Second stage ===
- Teams kept head-to-head results of preliminary stage in both groups.
- Tavush withdrew before the start of the second stage

==== Championship group ====
Pos	Team	Pld	W	D	L	GF	GA	GD	Pts	Promotion
1	Malatia	12	8	3	1	26	12	+14	27	Champions, promotion to Armenian Premier League.
2	FIMA Yerevan	12	5	2	5	15	15	0	17	
3	Pyunik-2	12	3	5	4	14	15	−1	14	
4	Aragats	12	2	2	8	8	21	−13	8	

==== Bottom group ====
Pos	Team	Pld	W	D	L	GF	GA	GD	Pts	Relegation
5	Dinamo Yerevan	10	8	0	2	35	12	+23	24	
6	Kasakh	10	8	0	2	30	17	+13	24	
7	Karmrakhayt	10	1	1	8	12	35	−23	4	
8	Tavush	0	-	-	-	-	-	—	0	Withdrew before start of the second stage.

== Top goalscorers ==
	Player	Team	Goals
1	(Armenia) Tigran Gharabaghtsyan	Malatia	16
2	(Armenia) Aramayis Kostikyan	Pyunik-2	16
3	(Armenia) Sargis Ohanyan	FIMA Yerevan	12

== See also ==
- 2001 Armenian Premier League
- 2001 Armenian Cup
- 2001 in Armenian football
