= Balep Ba Ndoumbouk =

Cameroonian footballer

Personal information
- Date of birth: 24 October 1987 (age 39)
- Place of birth: Yaoundé, Cameroon
- Height: 1.94 m (6 ft 4 in)
- Position: Midfielder

Youth career
- 2002–2003: Pyunik

Senior career*
| Years | Team | Apps | (Gls) |
| 2003–2004 | Pyunik | 33 | (2) |

International career
- Armenia U17
| 2002–2004 | Armenia U19 | 7 | (1) |
| 2003–2004 | Armenia U21 | 3 | (0) |
| 2004 | Armenia | 3 | (0) |
- * Club domestic league appearances and goals

Balep Ba Ndoumbouk (Armenian: Բալեպ Բա Նդումբուկ; born 24 October 1987 is a former football player. Born in Cameroon, he played for the Armenia national team.

== Club career ==
In 2002, Ndoumbouk joined Pyunik, initially playing with Pyunik's second and third teams. On 12 June 2003, Ndoumbouk made his debut for Pyunik's first team, scoring the opening goal in a 3–0 win against Mika. In his debut season, Ndoumbouk made 17 league appearances, scoring once, as the club won the Armenian Premier League. During the 2004 Armenian Premier League season, Ndoumbouk scored one goal in 16 appearances, as Pyunik won a league and Armenian Cup double.

Following the culmination of the 2004 season, Ndoumbouk left Pyunik and Armenia after he was found to have falsified his documentation, claiming he was younger than he was. Following his time in Armenia, Ndoumbouk played in France.

== International career ==
Ndoumbouk initially played for Armenia's under-19's, alongside fellow Cameroonian-born compatriots Carl Lombé and Apoula Edel. Ndoumbouk also represented Armenia at under-17 and Armenia under-21 level.

On 18 February 2004, Ndoumbouk made his debut for Armenia, coming on as a 74th-minute substitute in a 2–0 Cyprus International Football Tournament loss against Hungary. Upon doing so, Ndoumbouk became the first black player to represent Armenia, with Edel becoming the second black player to play for Armenia, making his debut a day later, in the same tournament, against Kazakhstan.

=== National team statistics ===
Armenia national team
| Year | Apps | Goals |
|---|---|---|
| 2004 | 3 | 0 |
| Total | 3 | 0 |
