= Armenian Supercup =

- Organiser(s): FFA
- Founded: 1996; 30 years ago
- Region: Armenia
- Teams: 2
- Domestic cup: Armenian Supercup
- Current champions: Noah (2nd title)
- Most championships: Pyunik (10 titles)
- 2026 Armenian Supercup

The Armenian Supercup is a match that is played between the Armenian Premier League Champion and Armenian Cup Winner. It is named after Hakob Tonoyan and typically takes place in May every year with some exceptions.

== Results ==
Armenian Supercup winners
Date	Winner	Score	Runners–up	Venue	Attendance
9 June 1996	Shirak	3–1	Pyunik	Hrazdan Stadium	
15 June 1997	Pyunik	2–0	Ararat Yerevan	Hrazdan Stadium	
15 November 1998	Tsement Ararat	1–1 (p (4–3))	Shirak	Hrazdan Stadium	
18 November 1999	Shirak	2–1	Tsement Ararat	Hrazdan Stadium	
2000-01	Match not held				
9 May 2002	Pyunik Winner of 2001 Armenian Premier League	2–1	Mika; Winner of 2001 Armenian Cup	Republican Stadium	
9 May 2003	Shirak Runner-up of 2002 Armenian Premier League	2–1	Pyunik; Winner of 2002 Armenian Premier League and 2002 Armenian Cup	Republican Stadium	
27 May 2004	Pyunik Winner of 2003 Armenian Premier League	1–0 aet	Mika; Winner of 2003 Armenian Cup	Republican Stadium	
2005	Pyunik Winner of 2004 Armenian Premier League and the 2004 Armenian Cup	1–0	Banants; Runner-up of 2004 Armenian Cup	Republican Stadium	
27 May 2006	Mika Winner of 2005 Armenian Cup	3–2	Pyunik; Winner of 2005 Armenian Premier League	Republican Stadium	
27 May 2007	Pyunik Winner of 2006 Armenian Premier League	2–1 aet	Mika; Winner of 2006 Armenian Cup	Republican Stadium	
24 September 2008	Pyunik Winner of 2007 Armenian Premier League	1–0	Banants; Winner of 2007 Armenian Cup	Hrazdan Stadium	
24 September 2009	Ararat Yerevan Winner of 2008 Armenian Cup	2–1	Pyunik; Winner of 2008 Armenian Premier League	Republican Stadium	2,000
24 September 2010	Pyunik Winner of 2009 Armenian Premier League and the 2009 Armenian Cup	2–0	Banants; Runner-up of 2009 Armenian Cup	Republican Stadium	2,100
24 September 2011	Pyunik Winner of 2010 Armenian Premier League and the 2010 Armenian Cup	3–0	Banants; Runner-up of 2010 Armenian Cup	Republican Stadium	500
24 September 2012	Mika Winner of 2011 Armenian Cup	0–0 (p (5–3))	Ulisses; Winner of 2011 Armenian Premier League	Republican Stadium	560
24 September 2013	Shirak Winner of 2012–13 Armenian Premier League	2–0	Pyunik; Winner of 2012–13 Armenian Cup	Republican Stadium	1,000
24 September 2014	Banants Winner of 2013–14 Armenian Premier League	3–0	Pyunik; Winner of 2013–14 Armenian Cup	Yerevan Football Academy Stadium	
24 September 2015	Pyunik Winner of the 2014–15 Armenian Premier League and the 2014–15 Armenian Cup	3–0	Mika; Runner-up of the 2014–15 Armenian Cup	Republican Stadium	1,000
24 September 2016	Alashkert Winner of the 2015–16 Armenian Cup	1–1 (p (3–2))	Banants; Winner of the 2015–16 Armenian Premier League	Republican Stadium	700
24 September 2017	Shirak Winner of the 2016–17 Armenian Cup	2–0	Alashkert; Winner of the 2016–17 Armenian Premier League	Republican Stadium	2,000
29 July 2018	Alashkert Winner of the 2017–18 Armenian Premier League	2–0	Gandzasar Kapan; Winner of the 2017–18 Armenian Cup	Republican Stadium	700
24 September 2019	Ararat-Armenia Winner of the 2018–19 Armenian Premier League	3–2 aet	Alashkert; Winner of the 2018–19 Armenian Cup	Republican Stadium	1,000
9 August 2020	Noah Winner of the 2019–20 Armenian Cup	2–1 aet	Ararat-Armenia; Winner of the 2019–20 Armenian Premier League	Football Academy Stadium	0
24 September 2021	Alashkert Winner of the 2020–21 Armenian Premier League	1–0	Ararat Yerevan; Winner of the 2020–21 Armenian Cup	Football Academy Stadium	800
24 September 2022	Pyunik Winner of the 2021–22 Armenian Premier League	+:-	Noravank; Winner of the 2021–22 Armenian Cup	The match did not take place due to the bankruptcy of Noravank. Pyunik awarded and received the Super Cup trophy in February 2023.	
7 October 2023	Shirak Runner-up of the 2022–23 Armenian Cup	0–0 (p (6–5))	Urartu; Winner of the 2022–23 Armenian Premier League and the 2022–23 Armenian Cup	City Stadium	
9 April 2025	Ararat-Armenia Winner of the 2023–24 Armenian Cup	4–0	Pyunik; Winner of the 2023–24 Armenian Premier League	Republican Stadium	
12 March 2026	Noah Winner of the 2024–25 Armenian Premier League and the 2024–25 Armenian Cup	1–1 (p (4–2))	Ararat-Armenia; Runner-up of the 2024–25 Armenian Premier League and the 2024–25 Armenian Cup	Republican Stadium	

== Results by team ==
Since its establishment, the Armenian Supercup has been won by eight different teams. Teams shown in italics are no longer in existence.

Results by team
Club	Wins	First Supercup won	Last Supercup won	Runners-up	Last Supercup lost	Total Supercup appearances
Pyunik	10	1998	2022	7	2024	17
Shirak	6	2000	2023	1	1999	7
Alashkert	3	2016	2021	2	2019	5
FC Mika	2	2006	2012	4	2015	6
Ararat-Armenia	2	2019	2024	2	2025	4
Noah	2	2020	2025	0		2
Urartu (Note: Urartu's total includes one win and five defeats under the earlier name of Banants.)	1	2014	2014	6	2023	7
Ararat Yerevan	1	2009	2009	2	2021	3
Araks Ararat (Note: Araks Ararat's total includes one win and one defeat under the earlier name of Tsement Ararat.)	1	1999	1999	1	2000	2
Ulisses	0			1	2012	1
Gandzasar Kapan	0			1	2018	1
Noravank (Note: Noravank ceased to exist before the 2022 match could take place.)	0			1	2022	1

== See also ==
- Football Federation of Armenia
- Football in Armenia
- Sport in Armenia
