= Gasparyan =

Gasparyan (Armenian: Գասպարյան, Գասպարեան) is an Armenian surname.

Gasparyan, Gasparian, Gasparjan in Eastern Armenian, or Kasparian, Kasparyan or Kasbarian (in Western Armenian) are all Latin alphabet variants of the same name, the spelling of which depends on what kind of romanization of Armenian has taken place.

It may refer to the following:

== People ==
=== Gasparyan ===
- Djivan Gasparyan (1928–2021), an Armenian musician and composer
- Edgar Gasparyan, an Armenian footballer
- Gohar Gasparyan (1924–2007), an Egypt-born Armenian opera singer
- Gohar Gasparyan (entertainer) (born 1985), an Armenian television announcer and journalist
- Margarita Gasparyan (born 1994), a Russian tennis player
- Onik Gasparyan (born 1970), an Armenian colonel general
- Ruben Gasparyan (1962–2013), an Armenian historian
- Rustam Gasparyan (1961–2020), an Armenian military officer and politician
- Samvel Gasparyan (born 1997), an Armenian weightlifter
- Siranush Gasparyan (born 1978), an Armenian dramatic soprano
- Vladimir Gasparyan (born 1958), an Armenian police chief

=== Gasparian ===
- Anzhela Gasparian (born 1996), a Russian judoka
- Fernando Gasparian, a Brazilian publisher and politician
- Jean-Paul Gasparian, a French pianist
- Scott Gasparian, aka 1Sky, an American-born Artist/Inventor

=== Kasparian ===
- Ana Kasparian (born 1986), American political talk show host
- Abraham Kasparian, American politician

=== Kasparyan ===
- Genrikh Kasparyan (1910–1995), chess grandmaster
- Yuri Kasparyan (born 1963), guitarist

=== Kasbarian ===
- Michael Petros III Kasparian, 3rd Catholicos-Patriarch of the Armenian Catholic Church
- Hovhannes Bedros XVIII Kasparian, 18th Catholicos-Patriarch of the Armenian Catholic Church
- Guillaume Kasbarian (born 1987), French business consultant and politician
- Sarkis Kasparian, former president of ASA Issy French football club

=== Kasparov ===
Kasparov is a Russified version of the same surname

- Garry Kasparov (born 1963), former world chess champion
- Gevorg Kasparov (born 1980), an Armenian goalkeeper

== See also ==
- Comendador Levy Gasparian, a Brazilian municipality
