= Artavazd Karamyan =

Armenian footballer (born 1979)

Artyom Karamyan
Personal information
- Date of birth: 14 November 1979 (age 46)
- Place of birth: Yerevan, Armenian SSR, Soviet Union
- Height: 1.77 m (5 ft 10 in)
- Positions: Left winger; left-back

Youth career
- –1996: Arabkir

Senior career*
Years	Team	Apps	(Gls)
1996–1997	Arabkir	7	(3)
1997–1998	Pyunik	10	(1)
1999–2000	Kilikia	56	(18)
2000	Mika		
2001–2002	Pyunik	42	(20)
2003	Panachaiki	15	(1)
2003–2004	Arsenal Kyiv	11	(1)
2004–2006	Rapid București	51	(1)
2007–2009	Politehnica Timişoara	92	(15)
2010	Steaua București	8	(0)
2010–2011	Unirea Urziceni	3	(0)
2012–2014	FC Clinceni	42	(9)
Total		337	(69)

International career
1999–2000	Armenia U21	4	(0)
2000–2010	Armenia	51	(2)
- * Club domestic league appearances and goals

Artavazd "Artyom" Karamyan (Armenian: Արտավազդ "Արտյոմ" Քարամյան; born 14 November 1979), is an Armenian former professional footballer who played as a left winger or a left-back.

== Club career ==
=== Arabkir ===
Artavazd Karamyan began playing football as a senior in 1996. That year, both he and his younger brother Arman Karamyan joined Arabkir.

=== Pyunik ===
In 1997, they both made their way to Pyunik Yerevan. Artavazd was a part of Pyunik when they won the Armenian Premier League in 2001 and 2002, the Armenian Cup in 2002 and Armenian Supercup in 1997 and 2002.

=== Kilikia & return to Pyunik ===
Both brothers moved to Kilikia Yerevan in 1999 and back to Pyunik in 2001.

=== Panachaiki ===
They both joined the Alpha Ethniki club Panachaiki Patras in 2003.

=== Arsenal Kyiv ===
From 2003 to 2004, they both played for Vyshcha Liha club Arsenal Kyiv.

=== Rapid București ===
Artyom and Arman both joined Divizia A club Rapid București in 2004. While Artavazd would remain in the club for a number of seasons, Arman left that season. While Artavazd was playing for the club, Rapid București won the Cupa României in 2005–06 and 2006–07. The club also made it to the quarterfinals of the 2005–06 UEFA Cup.

=== Politehnica Timişoara ===
Both Artyom and Arman reunited in the club Politehnica Timişoara in 2007.

=== Steaua București ===
The Karamyan brothers moved to Steaua București in 2010. After finishing Liga I for the 2009–10 season, the brothers ended their contracts with Steaua București. A search began to find the club they would both continue playing football in. But the process of finding a new club was delayed. Later, it was reported that the brothers were in talks with FC Brașov. However, the head coach of Brașov Daniel Isăilă later stated that the transition of the Karmanyans was unlikely to be completed because of the complexity of the negotiations, which reached a standstill. Talks were later made for the brothers to play for Astra Giurgiu, coached by Mihai Stoichiță. But after Stoichiță departed from the club, the talks ended. According to an edition of TotalFootball, because of the long search for a new team, the financial conditions for the Karamyan brothers increased to that of a required minimum of 10,000 euros per month. The option that both players finish their playing careers and enter into coaching activities was considered. In mid-September 2010, the search was over for Karamyan brothers.

=== Unirea Urziceni ===
The football players signed a contract with and officially moved into Unirea Urziceni.

In late October 2011, Stoichiță, who knew firsthand the playing abilities of both brothers, invited them to his current team Mioveni. However, Artavazd decided to retire as a player and go into business.

=== Buftea ===
A year later, Artavazd resumed his career and he and Arman both joined the Liga II club Buftea. In their first meeting, Artavazd scored twice. Arman also scored a goal in their second match.

== International career ==
Karamyan was a member of the Armenia national team and had participated in 51 international matches and scored 2 goals since his debut in an away friendly match against Guatemala on 9 January 2000 ending 1–1. In 2010, he retired from the national team.

== Personal life ==
Artyom's twin brother Arman is also a former professional footballer. Artavazd is married and has two daughters.

At the end of 2014, Karamyan and his brother took Romanian citizenship.

== Career statistics ==
=== International ===
Appearances and goals by national team and year
National team	Year	Apps	Goals
Armenia	2000	6	0
Armenia	2001	6	0
Armenia	2002	3	0
Armenia	2003	7	0
Armenia	2004	6	2
Armenia	2005	3	0
Armenia	2006	1	0
Armenia	2007	8	0
Armenia	2008	4	0
Armenia	2009	6	0
Armenia	2010	1	0
Total		51	2

Scores and results list Armenia's goal tally first, score column indicates score after each Karamyan goal.

#	Date	Venue	Opponent	Score	Result	Competition
1	19 February 2004	Pafiako Stadium, Paphos, Cyprus	Kazakhstan	2–1	3–3	Friendly
2	21 February 2004	Makario Stadium, Nicosia, Cyprus	Georgia	2–0	2–0	Friendly

== Honours ==
Pyunik

- Armenian Premier League: 2001, 2002
- Armenian Cup: 2002
- Armenian Supercup: 1998, 2002

Rapid București

- Cupa României: 2005–06
- Supercupa României runner-up: 2006

Politehnica Timişoara

- Cupa României runner-up: 2006–07, 2008–09
