= 2005 Armenian Cup =

Tournament details
- Country: Armenia
- Teams: 17

Final positions
- Champions: Mika
- Runners-up: Kilikia

Tournament statistics
- Matches played: 31
- Goals scored: 101 (3.26 per match)

The 2005 Armenian Cup was the 14th edition of the Armenian Cup, a football competition. In 2005, the tournament had 17 participants, out of which 4 were reserve teams.

== Results ==
=== Preliminary round ===
The first leg was played on the 8 March 2005. The second leg was played on the 11 March 2005.

Team 1	Agg.	Team 2	1st leg	2nd leg
FIMA Yerevan	0–8	Yerevan United	0–7	0–1

=== First round ===
The first legs were played on 14 and 15 March 2005. The second legs were played on 19 and 20 March 2005.

Team 1	Agg.	Team 2	1st leg	2nd leg
Mika-2 Ashtarak	1–5	Pyunik	0–2	1–3
Araks	1–4	Kilikia	0–3	1–1
Abovyan	0–24	Banants	0–9	0–15
Esteghlal-Kotayk-2	0–7	Dinamo-Zenit	0–5	0–2
Gandzasar	2–4	Shirak	2–2	0–2
Banants-2	1–4	Ararat Yerevan	1–3	0–1
Mika	2–1	Yerevan United	2–0	0–1
Esteghlal-Kotayk	5–1	Pyunik-2	3–0	2–1

=== Quarter-finals ===
The first legs were played on 3 and 4 April 2005. The second legs were played on 7 and 8 April 2005.

Team 1	Agg.	Team 2	1st leg	2nd leg
Shirak	2–6	Banants	2–5	0–1
Dinamo-Zenit	0–2	Mika	0–1	0–1
Esteghlal-Kotayk	2–1	Ararat Yerevan	1–1	1–0
Kilikia	1–0	Pyunik	1–0	0–0

=== Semi-finals ===
The first legs were played on 22 April 2005. The second legs were played on 26 and 28 April 2005.

Team 1	Agg.	Team 2	1st leg	2nd leg
Banants	4–4 (a)	Kilikia	2–3	2–1
Esteghlal-Kotayk	2–3	Mika	2–1	0–2

=== Final ===
9 May 2005

Mika	2 – 0	Kilikia
Zakarian 52' (o.g.); Magdiýew 77'

Vazgen Sargsyan Republican Stadium, Yerevan
Attendance: 6,000

== See also ==
- 2005 Armenian Premier League
- 2005 Armenian First League
