= 2004 Armenian First League =

Football league season

The 2004 Armenian First League season started on 1 May 2004. The last matches were played on 15 November 2004. Pyunik-2 became the league champions, but because they are a reserve team they were unable to promote to the Armenian Premier League. As a result, the second placed team Lernayin Artsakh FC was given promotion.

== Overview ==
- Araks Ararat FC and Lernayin Artsakh FC were relegated and withdrew from the Armenian Premier League respectively.
- Dinamo FA Yerevan were renamed as Dinamo Yerevan
- Spartak Yerevan FC became the reserve team of FC Banants and as a result were named Banants-2
- FC Zenit Charentsavan and FC Dinamo-VZ Yerevan are the reserve teams of Dinamo-Zenit Yerevan.
- FC Ararat Yerevan was expelled from the Premier League in 2003, so they restarted the 2004 season in the First League.
- Reserve teams, such as Pyunik-2, cannot be promoted.

== League table ==
Pos	Team	Pld	W	D	L	GF	GA	GD	Pts	Promotion
1	Pyunik-2	30	27	2	1	98	21	+77	83	Champions
2	Lernayin Artsakh FC	30	22	6	2	82	20	+62	72	Promoted to Armenian Premier League. Champions were unable to promote.
3	Gandzasar	30	17	6	7	52	32	+20	57	
4	Vagharshapat	30	17	3	10	61	42	+19	54	
5	Mika-2	30	15	9	6	48	25	+23	54	
6	Araks Ararat FC	30	16	3	11	57	31	+26	51	
7	Ararat Yerevan	30	16	1	13	83	50	+33	49	
8	Banants-2	30	13	9	8	40	30	+10	48	
9	Pyunik-3	30	13	4	13	56	47	+9	43	
10	Banants-3	30	11	6	13	46	48	−2	39	
11	FC Lokomotiv Yerevan	30	8	6	16	29	51	−22	30	
12	Dinamo Yerevan	30	9	1	20	52	72	−20	28	
13	FC Dinamo-VZ Yerevan	30	7	3	20	46	83	−37	24	
14	Lori Vanadzor	30	7	6	17	35	68	−33	24 (Note: Lori Vanadzor and Nork Marash FC were docked 3 points.)	
15	FC Zenit Charentsavan	30	6	3	21	34	89	−55	21	
16	Nork Marash FC (Note: Nork Marash FC withdrew after Matchday 26.)	30	2	0	28	7	117	−110	3	Withdrew in the middle of the season. Unplayed matches awarded 3-0 against them.

== See also ==
- 2004 Armenian Premier League
- 2004 Armenian Cup
