= Anatoliy Piskovets =

Ukrainian footballer and coach

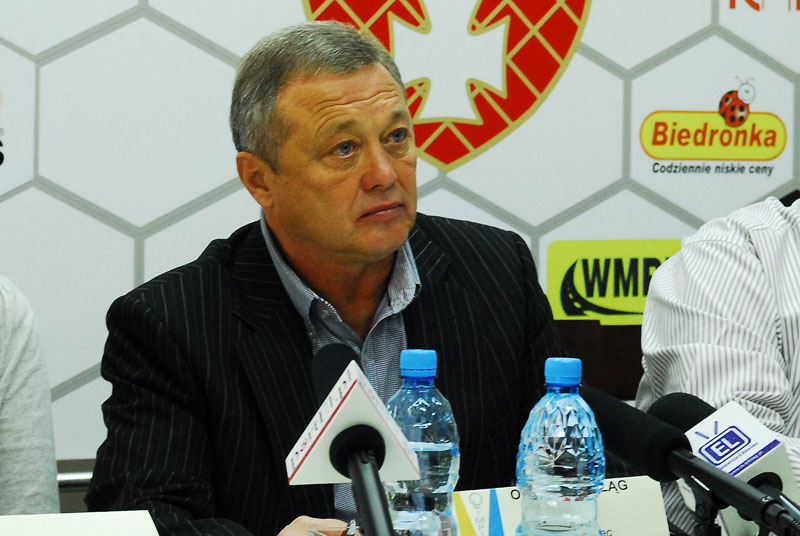

Personal information
- Full name: Anatoliy Pavlovych Piskovets
- Date of birth: 27 March 1948 (age 78)
- Place of birth: Kyiv, Ukrainian SSR, Soviet Union
- Position: Midfielder

Senior career*
Years	Team	Apps	(Gls)
- Vulkan Petropavlovsk
- Uralan Elista
- Frunzenets Sumy

Managerial career
- 1980–1981: Nyva Myronivka
- 1981–1982: SKA Kiev (assistant)
- 1983: Khimik Dzerzhinsk
- 1990–1992: Intersport Kyiv
- 1992–1994: Shabab Al-Ahli
- 1994–1998: Alina Kyiv
- 1996–1998: Ukraine (women)
- 1998–1999: Energy Voronezh
- 1998–1999: Lehenda Chernihiv
- 1999–2000: Ukraine U19 (women)
- 2000–2002: Ukraine (women)
- 2004: Kryvbas Kryvyi Rih
- 2005: Inter Baku (assistant)
- 2005–2006: Simurq PIK
- 2006: Stal Alchevsk (assistant)
- 2006–2008: Lehenda Chernihiv
- 2007: Naftovyk Okhtyrka (assistant)
- 2007–2008: Olimpi Rustavi
- 2010–2011: Gagra
- 2011–2012: Olimpia Elbląg
- 2012–2013: Volyn Lutsk (assistant)
- 2013: Volyn Lutsk
- 2015: Daugava
- 2015: Gagra
- 2015–2016: Obukhiv
- 2016–2017: Gagra
- 2018–2019: Lokomotiv Yerevan
- 2023–2024: Odishi 1919
- * Club domestic league appearances and goals

Anatoliy Pavlovych Piskovets (Ukrainian: Анатолій Павлович Пісковець; born 27 March 1948) is a Ukrainian professional football manager and former player who played as a midfielder. Most recently he was in charge of Georgian club Odishi 1919.

From 1996 to 1998 and again from 2000 to 2002, he served as head coach of the Ukraine women's national football team.
