= Kotayk (village) =

Kotayk Կոտայք
- Village
- Location within Armenia
- Coordinates: 40°16′30″N 44°39′38″E
- Country: Armenia
- Marz (Province): Kotayk
- Elevation: 1,437 m (4,715 ft)

Population (2011)
  - Total: 1,558
- Time zone: UTC+4 ( )

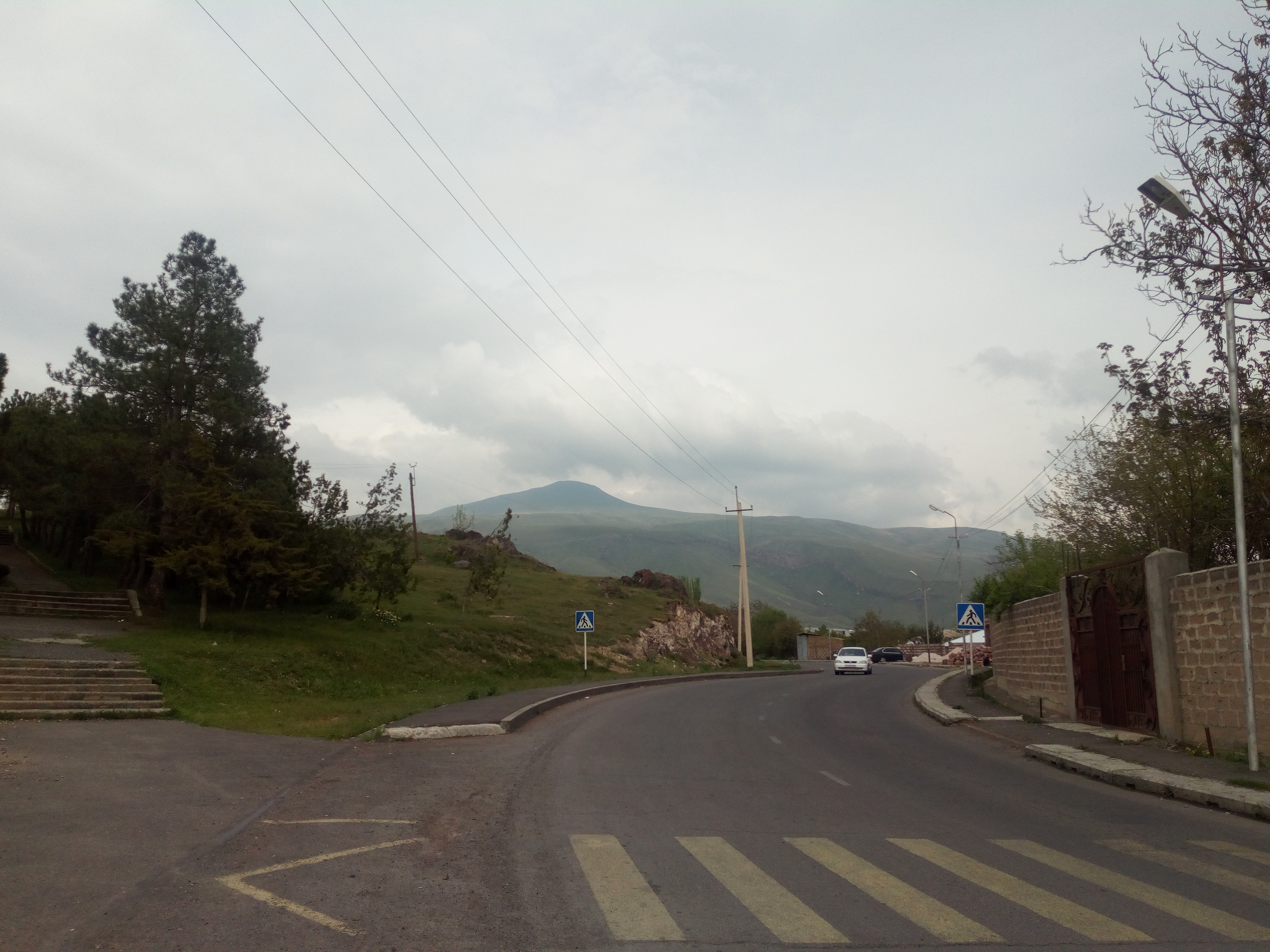

Kotayk (Armenian: Կոտայք), formerly known as Yelgovan, is a village in the Kotayk Province of Armenia.

== See also ==
- Kotayk Province
