= Jean-Paul Gasparian =

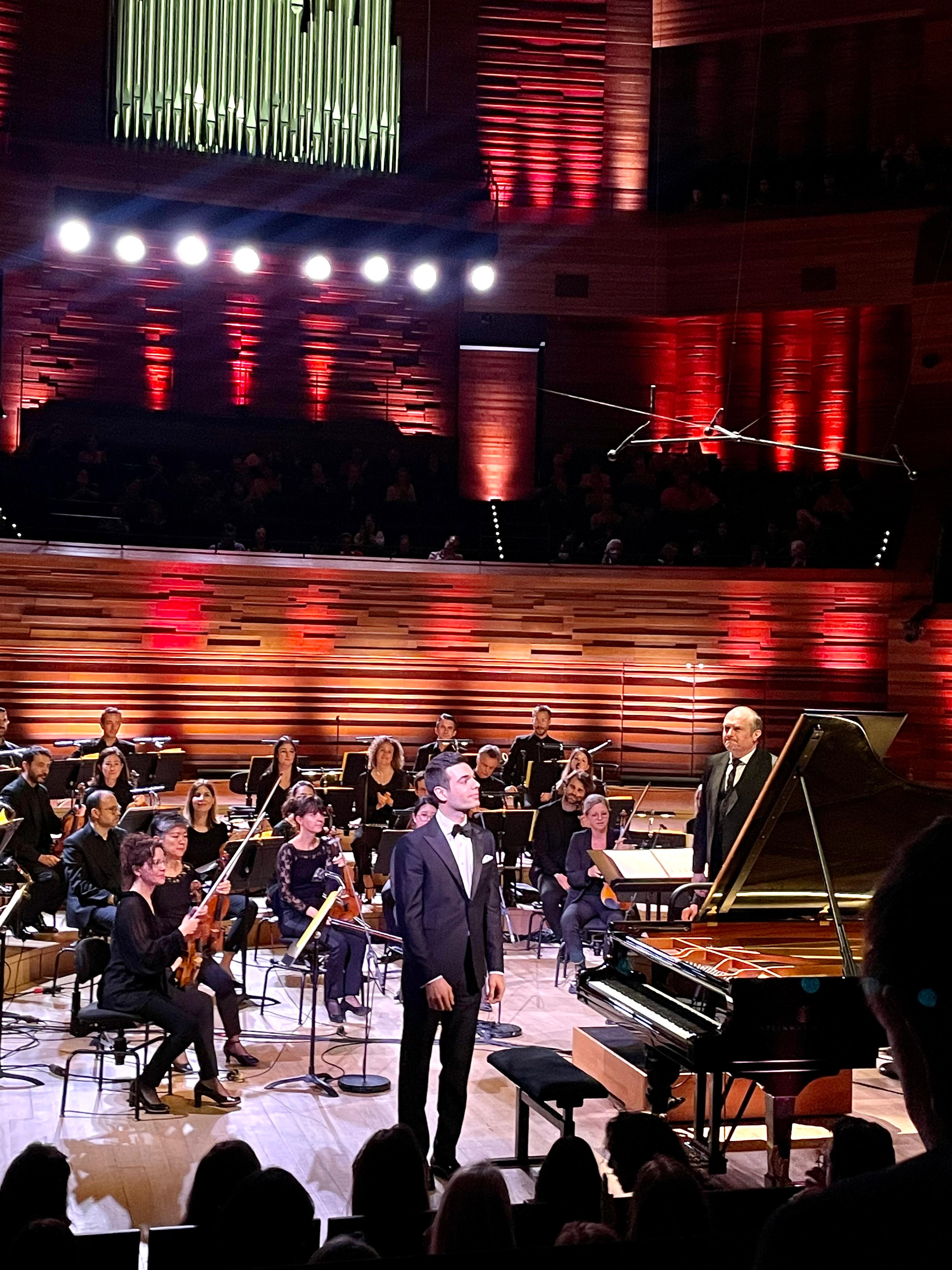
- Jean-Paul Gasparian at the Auditorium of the Maison de la Radio et de la Musique

Background information
- Born: 1995 (age 30–31); Paris, France
- Genre: Classical
- Occupation: Pianist
- Instrument: Piano
- Years active: 2010–present
- Labels: Naïve, Claves
- Website: jeanpaulgasparian.com

Jean-Paul Gasparian (born 1995) is a French pianist.

== Early life ==
Jean-Paul Gasparian was born in Paris in 1995 of musician parents. His father, Gérard Gasparian, is a pianist and composer of Armenian origin.

He was admitted to the Paris Conservatory at the age of 14, where he studied with Olivier Gardon, Jacques Rouvier, Michel Béroff, Laurent Cabasso, Claire Désert and Michel Dalberto. He then continued his studies at the Royal College of Music in London with Vanessa Latarche, obtaining an Artist diploma in 2018. He has also worked with Russian pianist Tatiana Zelikman and Georgian pianist Elisso Virsaladze.

== Career ==
Jean-Paul Gasparian won the European Piano Competition Bremen in 2014. In 2020, he received the Thierry Scherz Prize at the Sommets Musicaux de Gstaad, which enabled him to record an album with the Bern Symphony Orchestra, including Rachmaninoff's Piano Concerto No. 2 and Arno Babadjanian's Heroic Ballad. He has been nominated in the "Instrumental Soloist" category at the 2021 Victoires de la musique classique awards.

Jean-Paul Gasparian has performed in prestigious venues such as the Salle Cortot, the Paris Philharmonic Hall, the Teatro San Carlo or the Yokohama Minato Mirai Hall.

In 2023, he took part in the "Howard Shore Weekend" organized at the Maison de la Radio et de la Musique in Paris, dedicated to the work of the Canadian composer. There, he performed the French premiere of the Concerto for Piano and Orchestra Ruin and Memory, as well as the piano piece Catania, which was recorded during the event and released in the box set Howard Shore: Anthology – The Paris Concerts, published by Deutsche Grammophon.

Since 2017, he has recorded six albums featuring works by composers such as Rachmaninoff, Scriabin, Prokofiev, Chopin and Debussy. In 2024 saw the release of his album Origins (Naïve), dedicated to the Armenian repertoire and featuring works by Arno Babadjanian, Aram Khachaturian, Komitas, and his father Gérard Gasparian.

In 2025, he made his solo debut with the Belgrade Philharmonic Orchestra and opened the 80th season of the Nuremberg Symphony Orchestra performing Felix Mendelssohn's First Piano Concerto conducted by Jonathan Darlington.

== Critical reception ==
Jean-Paul Gasparian has received critical acclaim for his performances and albums. In 2023, the French newspaper Les Échos listed him among the "10 French pianists who embody the next generation" and described him as "an outstanding pianist". His bravery is said to be reminiscent of the great 20th-century virtuosos, such as Vladimir Horowitz and Sviatoslav Richter.

His latest album, Origins, has been described as "an utterly disarming disc of music", and the British magazine Gramophone praised the pianist for his "significant finesse and flawless technique".

== Prizes and distinctions ==
- Winner of European Piano Competition Bremen (second prize tie, first prize not awarded)
- 4th prize and special prize for contemporary music at the José Iturbi International Piano Competition 2015
- 3rd prize at the Hastings International Piano Concerto Competition 2013
- Prix Thierry-Scherz at the Sommets Musicaux de Gstaad 2020
- 3rd prize at the Lyon International Piano Competition 2013
- Nominated at the Victoires de la musique classique 2021

== Discography ==
- Rachmaninoff, Scriabin, Prokofiev – Evidence Classics (2018)
- Chopin – Evidence Classics (2019)
- Rachmaninoff – Evidence Classics (2022)
- Rachmaninoff, Babadjanian – Claves (2022)
- Debussy – Naïve (2023)
- Origins – Naïve (2024)
