= Alexander Tadevosyan =

Armenian footballer

Personal information
- Full name: Alexander Yurai Tadevosyan
- Date of birth: 9 August 1980 (age 46)
- Place of birth: Tbilisi, Georgian SSR, Soviet Union
- Height: 1.85 m (6 ft 1 in)
- Position: Defender

Senior career*
| Years | Team | Apps | (Gls) |
| 1998 | Pyunik Yerevan | 8 | (0) |
| 1998–2002 | Ararat Yerevan | 99 | (11) |
| 2003–2006 | Pyunik Yerevan | 84 | (4) |
| 2006–2007 | Bargh Shiraz | 11 | (0) |
| 2007 | Pyunik Yerevan | 16 | (0) |
| 2008 | Vitebsk | 28 | (0) |
| 2009–2011 | Mika Yerevan | 58 | (5) |
| 2012 | Al Ahed | 11 | (1) |
| 2012 | Mika Yerevan | 7 | (0) |

International career
| 2002–2010 | Armenia | 41 | (0) |
- * Club domestic league appearances and goals

Alexander Yurai Tadevosyan (Armenian: Ալեքսանդր Յուրայի Թադևոսյան, born 9 August 1980) is a retired Armenian football defender. He was a member of the Armenia national team, and has participated in 40 international matches since his debut in an away friendly match against Andorra on 7 June 2002.

== National team statistics ==
Armenia national team
| Year | Apps | Goals |
|---|---|---|
| 2002 | 1 | 0 |
| 2003 | 0 | 0 |
| 2004 | 6 | 0 |
| 2005 | 8 | 0 |
| 2006 | 3 | 0 |
| 2007 | 9 | 0 |
| 2008 | 9 | 0 |
| 2009 | 3 | 0 |
| 2010 | 1 | 0 |
| Total | 40 | 0 |
