= Etchmiadzin Stadium =

Football stadium in Vagharshapat, Armenia

Coordinates: 40°09′32″N 44°17′27″E

- Interactive map of Etchmiadzin Stadium
- Full name: Etchmiadzin Stadium
- Location: Vagharshapat, Armenia
- Owner: Mother See of Holy Etchmiadzin
- Capacity: 3,000
- Surface: grass
- Field size: 103 x 70 meters

Construction
- Opened: 1973

Tenant
- Vagharshapat (1973-2005)

Etchmiadzin Stadium (Armenian: Էջմիածին Մարզադաշտ), is an abandoned football stadium in Vagharshapat, Armenia. Owned by the Mother See of Holy Etchmiadzin, the stadium is located near the southern walls of the Mother See complex. It is named after the Mother Cathedral of Holy Etchmiadzin which is considered the spiritual centre of Christian Armenians worldwide.

== Overview ==
The stadium was opened in 1973 and has a capacity of 3,000 spectators. It was home to FC Vagharshapat until 2005, when the club was dissolved and retired from professional football. In 2005, the ownership of the stadium was transferred to the Mother See of Holy Etchmiadzin by the decision of the government of Armenia. It is located around 250 metres south of the Etchmiadzin Cathedral.

The stadium was occasionally used by several youth football schools in the Armavir Province. However, the infrastructure of the stadium is outdated, as it had never been renovated since its inauguration.

Currently, the structure is entirely abandoned.

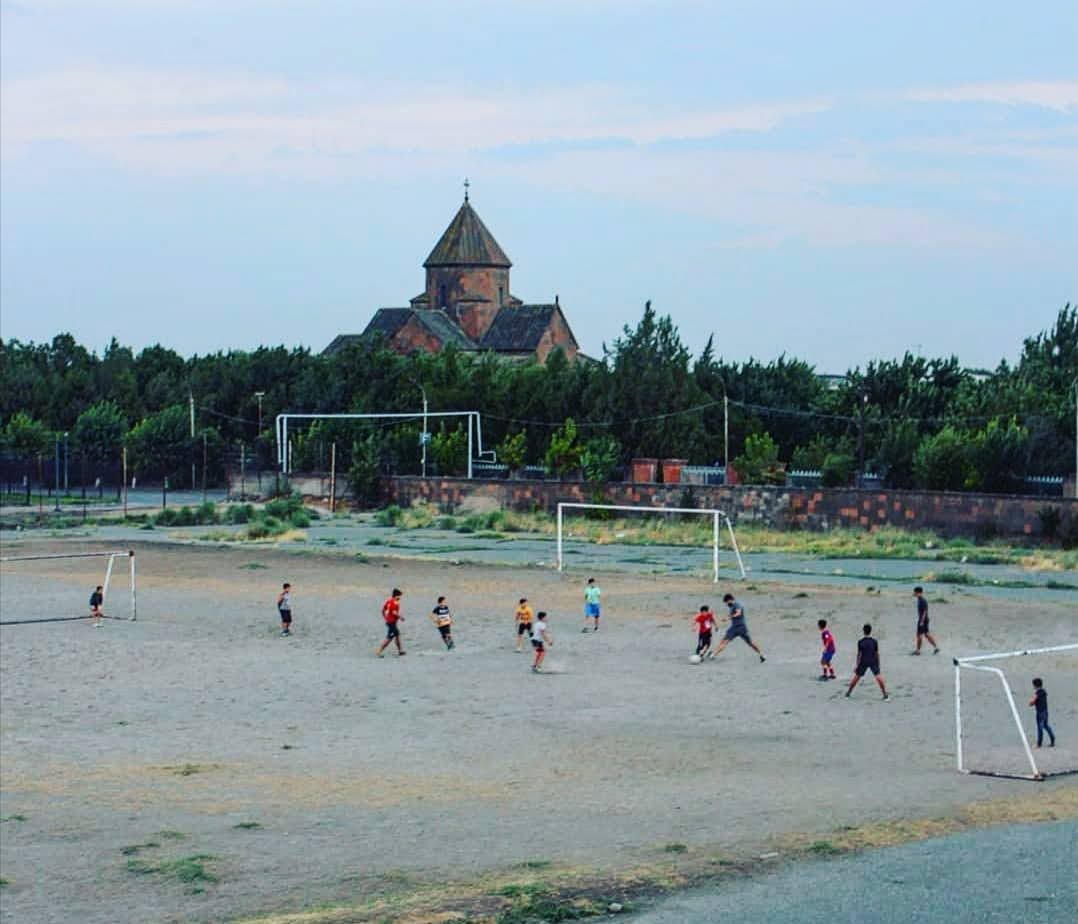
The stadium as it looked in 2020
