= Ruben Gasparyan =

Armenian historian

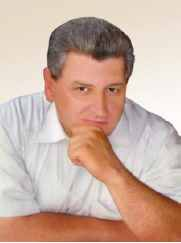
Ruben Gasparyan

Ruben Henrik Gasparyan (June 25, 1962 – July 10, 2013) was an expert in Armenian history, a university professor and researcher at the Department of Modern History of the Institute of History of the National Academy of Sciences of Armenia.

== Biography ==
Gasparyan was born in Yerevan, and graduated in 1984 from Yerevan State Pedagogical University, with a major in History and Pedagogy at the Department of History and Geography Studies. From 1984 to 1989, he worked as a history teacher in the Akunq village school in the province of Abovyan (later renamed Kotayk), while commencing extramural postgraduate studies at the National Academy of Sciences. His thesis “The socio-political life of the Armenians of Cilicia in 1900-1921s” was supervised by Dr. Haykaz Poghosyan. From 1989 to 1996 he taught history and social sciences at No. 57 secondary school, while beginning research on the Cilician Armenians .

During the Young Researchers’ 20th session at the NAS RA Institute of History in 1986, Ruben Gasparyan delivered a speech on Adana's bloody massacres of innocent civilians. The researcher impressed his audience with his remarkable research skills and the advanced methods he had applied to his research work. The period between 1988 and 1991 was a restless time. The Artsakh liberation movement began in February 1988. It was another wake-up call for the Armenian people. Gasparyan didn't stay aloof and, like most of the people, actively participated in mass demonstrations and rallies in support of Artsakh, helping to obtain essential supplies, including books, for the people of Artsakh.

In 1991, Gasparyan defended his thesis and was awarded candidacy for a PhD in History. Shortly afterwards, he took a job as a researcher at the Department of New History of the NAS RA Institute of History. Gasparyan was thereupon elected Chair of the Young Researchers’ Council and continued in this role until 1997. Along with this job, he held the position of Scientific Secretary for four years’ time (1995-1999). From 1999 to 2009, he was in charge of the Department of Higher Education and the Department of Higher and Postgraduate Education at the Ministry of Education and Science of Armenia, and ran classes for master's program students at Yerevan State University. In 2009, he returned to the National Academy of Sciences. From 1 July 2010 to June 2011, he was Head of the Department of the Armenian Question and the History of the Armenian genocide. In June 2011, Gasparyan moved back to the Department of Modern History where he remained until the end of his life. Ruben Gasparyan would have brought the work on his doctoral thesis to a close but for the serious illness which hindered him from fulfilling it. The NAS RA Institute of History intends to develop Gasparyan's research work for its final release and have it published in 2015.

== Books ==
After the dissolution of the Soviet Union, Armenian l teachers, without any new history textbooks in their possession, would make use of the articles widely published in those days. Ruben Gasparyan was one of the authors whose articles appeared continually in a few periodicals, including “Mayreni” (Native) and “Azatamart” (Fight for Freedom). In 1993, before the new textbooks would be ready for publication, the Ministry of Education decided to bring out a manual for the 9th grade schoolchildren. The aim was to elucidate, truthfully and anew, a number of key issues and pivotal moments of the 1900-1939s, which turned out to be a very complicated period of history. The revelation of the truth would contribute immensely to the writing of the new textbook, thereby enriching both the teachers’ and schoolchildren's knowledge. A group of the NAS RA Institute of History collaborators, under the leadership of Hrant Avetisyan, an associate member of the Academy of Sciences, designed a manual for the 9th grade schoolchildren. Ruben Gasparyan wrote one whole chapter which was titled “Western Armenia at the beginning of the 20th century” and outlined the country's economic development, national liberation movements in 1900-1908s, the Armenian Question in 1912-1914s and many other issues.

As soon as the manual was published, the NAS RA Institute of History editors were asked to write more history school-books for fifth, sixth, seventh and eighth grades. The academician Vladimir Barkhudaryan assembled a team of first-class writers from all over the country. Ruben Gasparyan and Ruben Sahakyan were assigned to provide the methodological part, i.e. questions, assignments and chapter summaries. Gasparyan also authored Chapter 9 (“The massacres of the Western Armenians and the self-defense battles in 1890s”) of the eighth-grade history school-book which was reprinted in 2013.

In 2003, Gasparyan wrote Paragraphs 8 to 15 (pages 35–63) for the eighth-grade textbook “The History of the Armenian Church,” which was edited by P. Hovhannisyan and Bishop Abraham Mkrtchyan. Gasparyan's monograph “The Armenians of Cilicia at the beginning of the 20th century” was published in 1999.

As a history professor at Yerevan State University, Gasparyan developed a separate history course entitled “The History of the Voluntary Movements (19th century – 1921).” Gasparyan was convinced that it was highly essential to introduce the subject into the master program curriculum and gave the following explanation in justification of his resolution: “The voluntary movements, which arose at the beginning of the 19th century and ran on up to 1921, played a vital role in the Armenian history. This topic does require further elucidation. The history of the voluntary movements is closely linked with the national liberation struggle for the restoration of independent statehood.”

In the last few years of his life, Gasparyan would work with Ruben Sahakyan, his co-author. They first developed Hovhannes Ter-Martirosyan’s (also known as A-Do) unpublished pieces for the final release and then worked on the unpublished memoirs of Yeghishe Buranyan from Van. Sadly, both pieces came out after Gasparyan's death. Gasparyan and his co-author had also begun work on the unpublished memoirs of Michael Ter-Martirosyan, A-Do's younger brother, who was a national liberation movement activist. Michael (nicknamed Mar) was a member of the Armenian Revolutionary Federation (Dashnak Party) and a participant of the occupation of the Ottoman Bank in Constantinople in 1896
