= 2002 Armenian Premier League =

Football league season

2002 Armenian Premier League describes the events and results of the 2002 Premier League of association football in Armenia in 2002.

== Overview ==
- Malatia were disbanded before the season began, therefore FC Lori were given the chance to stay up.
- FC Karabakh Yerevan changed their name to Lernayin Artsakh FC Yerevan.

== League table ==
Pos	Team	Pld	W	D	L	GF	GA	GD	Pts	Qualification or relegation
1	Pyunik (C)	22	19	2	1	85	14	+71	59	Qualification for the Champions League first qualifying round
2	Shirak	22	16	3	3	49	15	+34	51	Qualification for the UEFA Cup qualifying round
3	Banants	22	16	2	4	43	15	+28	50	Qualification for the UEFA Cup qualifying round
4	Spartak Yerevan	22	15	4	3	58	16	+42	49	
5	Ararat Yerevan	22	9	6	7	39	22	+17	33	
6	Mika Ashtarak	22	9	6	7	35	28	+7	33	
7	Zvartnots-AAL	22	10	2	10	57	29	+28	32	
8	Lernagorts Kapan	22	6	5	11	21	43	−22	23	
9	Lernayin Artsakh	22	5	2	15	21	52	−31	17	
10	Dinamo-2000 Yerevan	22	3	3	16	19	63	−44	12	
11	Kotayk	22	2	5	15	17	62	−45	11	Qualification for the Intertoto Cup first round
12	Lori Vanadzor (R)	22	1	2	19	15	100	−85	5	Relegation to First League
13	Malatia (W)	0	0	0	0	0	0	0	0	Withdrew (Note: Malatia withdrew before start of the season.)

Source: RSSSF
(C) Champions; (R) Relegated; (W) Withdrew

== Results ==
Home \ Away	ARA	BAN	DIN	KOT	LRG	LRY	LOR	MIK	PYU	SHI	SPA	ZVA
Ararat Yerevan		1–2	3–1	5–1	0–0	3–2	2–0	3–0	0–1	0–1	0–1	1–0
Banants	1–0		2–0	4–1	3–1	3–0	10–0	2–0	0–2	0–0	0–1	3–2
Dinamo-2000 Yerevan	0–5	0–3		1–1	2–3	3–0	0–0	0–4	0–4	0–2	0–4	0–6
Kotayk	2–2	1–1	1–3		1–1	0–2	1–1	1–3	1–5	0–6	0–1	0–5
Lernagorts Kapan	1–1	0–1	1–0	1–0		2–0	1–2	1–1	0–5	0–3	0–2	2–1
Lernayin Artsakh	0–5	0–1	2–0	2–0	1–1		5–1	2–2	0–1	1–2	0–4	0–7
Lori Vanadzor	1–5	0–1	2–3	1–3	0–5	1–2		0–3	0–7	0–4	1–6	0–5
Mika Ashtarak	2–2	1–2	3–3	2–1	2–0	3–1	4–1		0–2	0–1	1–1	1–2
Pyunik	3–0 (Note: Match awarded.)	3–1	5–0	7–0	6–0	2–0	13–2	0–0		5–0	3–1	4–3
Shirak	1–1	1–0	5–1	3–0	3–0	3–1	7–0	2–0	1–0		1–3	1–0
Spartak Yerevan	2–0	0–1	3–2	5–0	6–0	2–0	7–0	1–2	2–2	2–2		1–1
Zvartnots-AAL	0–0	1–2	4–0	1–2	3–1	6–0	6–2	0–1	3–5	1–0	0–3	

Legend: Blue = home team win; Yellow = draw; Red = away team win.

== Top goalscorers ==
#	Player		Team	Goals
1	(Armenia)	Arman Karamyan	Pyunik	36
2	(Armenia)	Ara Hakobyan	Spartak Yerevan	21
3	(Armenia)	Artyom Adamyan	Mika Ashtarak	15
3	(Armenia)	Aram Hakobyan	Spartak Yerevan	15
5	(Armenia)	Artavazd Karamyan	Pyunik	14

Source: RSSSF

== See also ==
- 2002 in Armenian football
- 2002 Armenian First League
- 2002 Armenian Cup
