= 2002 Armenian Cup =

Tournament details
- Country: Armenia
- Teams: 16

Final positions
- Champions: Pyunik
- Runners-up: Zvartnots-AAL

Tournament statistics
- Matches played: 29
- Goals scored: 109 (3.76 per match)

The 2002 Armenian Cup was the 11th edition of the Armenian Cup, a football competition. In 2002, the tournament had 16 participants, out of which 2 were reserve teams.

== Results ==
=== First round ===
The first legs were played on 30 and 31 March 2002. The second legs were played on 3 and 6 April 2002.

Team 1	Agg.	Team 2	1st leg	2nd leg
Dinamo Yerevan	0–13	Pyunik	0–5	0–8
Banants	4–1	Karabakh	3–0	1–1
Lori	1–9	Mika	1–2	0–7
Lokomotiv Yerevan	1–7	Shirak	1–6	0–1
Armavir	0–10	Spartak Yerevan	0–6	0–4
Spartak-2 Yerevan	2–6	Ararat Yerevan	0–4	2–2
Dinamo-2000	3–0	Kotayk	2–0	1–0
Pyunik-2	1–12	Zvartnots-AAL	1–6	0–6

=== Quarter-finals ===
The first legs were played on 19 and 20 April 2002. The second legs were played on 27 and 28 April 2002.

Team 1	Agg.	Team 2	1st leg	2nd leg
Banants	1–4	Pyunik	1–2	0–2
Mika	(a) 2–2	Shirak	0–1	2–1
Zvartnots-AAL	7–3	Dinamo-2000	3–3	4–0
Ararat Yerevan	2–3	Spartak Yerevan	1–0	1–3

=== Semi-finals ===
The first legs were played on 14 and 15 May 2002. The second legs were played on 20 and 21 May 2002.

Team 1	Agg.	Team 2	1st leg	2nd leg
Pyunik	7–2	Mika	4–1	3–1
Zvartnots-AAL	3–1	Spartak Yerevan	0–0	3–1

=== Final ===
27 May 2002

Pyunik	2 – 0	Zvartnots-AAL
Diawara 18'; Karamyan 44'

Republican Stadium, Yerevan
Attendance: 10,000
Referee: Karen Nalbandyan (Yerevan)

== See also ==
- 2002 Armenian Premier League
