= Romeo Jenebyan =

Armenian footballer

Personal information
- Date of birth: 10 September 1979 (age 47)
- Position: Midfielder

Senior career*
Years	Team	Apps	(Gls)
2000–2008	Banants Yerevan	147	(16)
2008–2008	Mika Yerevan	13	(2)
2009–2010	Impuls Dilijan	6	(1)

International career
2005	Armenia	3	(0)
- * Club domestic league appearances and goals

Romeo Jenebyan (born 10 September 1979) is a former Armenian football player. He has played for Armenia national team.

== National team statistics ==
Armenia national team
Year	Apps	Goals
2005	3	0
Total	3	0
