= Nshan Erzrumyan =

Armenian footballer (born 1979)

Personal information
- Full name: Nshan Erzrumyan
- Date of birth: 17 December 1979 (age 46)
- Place of birth: Yerevan, Soviet Armenia
- Height: 1.76 m (5 ft 9 1/2 in)
- Position: Striker

Youth career
- 1996 – 1999: FC Pyunik

Senior career*
Years	Team	Apps	(Gls)
2000–2001	Kilikia Yerevan	4	(2)
2001–2002	SKA Rostov	4	(0)
2003–2004	Banants Yerevan	1	(0)
2004–2006	Kilikia Yerevan	51	(41)
2006–2009	Ararat Yerevan	35	(23)

International career^{‡}
2005–2006	Armenia	2	(0)
- * Club domestic league appearances and goals as of 20 November 2008 ‡ National team caps and goals as of 14 November 2012

Nshan Erzrumyan (Armenian: Նշան Էրզրումյան; born 17 December 1979) is a former Armenian football striker. Nshan was the highest goal scorer in the 2005 season and the second highest scorer in the 2006 season with 22 goals. He was a member of the Armenia national team, and has 2 caps since his debut in 2005.
