= Yerevan United FC =

Yerevan United
- Full name: Yerevan United Football Club
- Founded: 2004; 21 years ago
- Dissolved: 2006; 19 years ago
- Ground: Vazgen Sargsyan Republican Stadium; Yerevan
- Capacity: 14,968
Home colours	Away colours

Yerevan United Football Club or YUFC (Armenian: Երևան Յունայթդ Ֆուտբոլային Ակումբ) was an Armenian football club from the capital Yerevan. The club participated in the domestic competitions between 2004 and 2006.

It is currently inactive and does not participate in any of domestic leagues.
