= Carl Lombé =

Cameroonian-Armenian footballer

Personal information
- Full name: Carl Lombé
- Date of birth: 18 May 1986 (age 40)
- Place of birth: Yaoundé, Cameroon
- Height: 1.67 m (5 ft 6 in)
- Position: Midfielder

Senior career*
Years	Team	Apps	(Gls)
2003–2005	Pyunik FC	29	(3)
2005–2007	FC Rapid București		
2007	SV Wehen Wiesbaden	1	(0)
2008–2012	Aris Limassol F.C.	86	(0)

International career
	Armenia U19	2	(1)
	Armenia U21	12	(0)
- * Club domestic league appearances and goals as of 8 May 2010

Carl Lombé (born 18 May 1986 in Yaoundé) is a Cameroonian–Armenian footballer who played for Cypriot side Aris Limassol F.C.

Despite being capped for Armenia at youth level, he is still eligible to play for Cameroon as he never played for Armenia in the senior team.

== Biography ==
Lombé moved to Armenia in 2002 and signed a contract with Pyunik FC in March 2003. In 2005, he joined Rapid București along with Apoula Edel by unilaterally terminated his contract without just reason. Pyunik FC submitted the case to FIFA Dispute Resolution Chamber, which the DRC passed a decision on 4 April 2007 and sent the decision to the parties on 3 August, which Lombé was ordered to pay Pyunik US$15,000. He also claimed he was forced to naturalise in the court as an excuse to leave the country in 2005. The parties submitted the appeal to the Court of Arbitration for Sport and CAS partially upheld the DRC decision and increased the fee to US$25,000 in 2008.
