= FC Abovyan =

Abovyan
- Full name: Football Club Abovyan
- Founded: 2005; 20 years ago
- Dissolved: 2005; 20 years ago
- Ground: Kotayk Stadium; Abovyan
- Capacity: 5,500

FC Abovyan (Armenian: Ֆուտբոլային Ակումբ Աբովյան), is a defunct Armenian football club from the town of Abovyan, Kotayk Province. The club was formed in 2005 and participated in the Armenian First League during the same year. However, the club was dissolved by the end of the 2005 season of the First League.

== League record ==
| Year | Club Name | Division | Position | GP | W | D | L | GS | GA | PTS |
|---|---|---|---|---|---|---|---|---|---|---|
| 2005 | Abovyan | Armenian First League | 12 | 24 | 2 | 0 | 22 | 13 | 125 | 6 |
