= Nork Marash FC =

Nork Marash
- Full name: Football Club Nork Marash
- Founded: 2002; 23 years ago
- Dissolved: 2004; 21 years ago

Nork Marash FC (Armenian: Նորք Մարաշ Ֆուտբոլային Ակումբ) was an Armenian football club from the capital Yerevan. The club was formed in 2002 and participated in the Armenian First League during the same year. However, the club was dissolved in 2004 after the 26th round of the First League season.

== League record ==
Year	Division	Position	GP	W	D	L	GS	GA	GD	PTS
2002	Armenian First League	12	30	5	4	21	26	99	-73	19
2003	Armenian First League	11	22	3	3	16	23	64	-41	12
2004	Armenian First League	16	30	2	0	28	7	117	-110	3

- They were deducted by 3 point in the 2004 season.
