= FC Malatia =

Football club in Armenia

FC Malatia (Armenian: Ֆուտբոլային Ակումբ Մալաթիա) was an Armenian football club from the capital Yerevan. The club was founded in 1990, dissolved in 2002 and is currently inactive from professional football. The club's only European participation was in the 2011 UEFA Regions' Cup, where they finished last in Group B of the Preliminary Round.

FC Malatia logo

== League record ==
Year	Club Name	Division	Position	GP	W	D	L	GS	GA	PTS
1990	Malatia	Soviet Lower Second League	6	22	9	2	11	39	45	20
1991	Malatia	Soviet Lower Second League	7	38	16	8	14	59	54	40
1992	Malatia	Armenian Premier League	16	22	11	5	6	58	37	27
1993	Malatia-Kilikia	Armenian Premier League	15	28	2	5	21	25	92	9
1994–2000	no participation									
2001	Malatia	Armenian First League	1	14	10	3	1	39	14	33
2002–present	no participation									
