= FC Vagharshapat =

Vagharshapat
- Full name: Football Club Vagarshapat
- Founded: 2003; 22 years ago
- Dissolved: 2006; 19 years ago
- Ground: Etchmiadzin Stadium; Vagharshapat
- Capacity: 3,000

FC Vagharshapat (Armenian: Ֆուտբոլային Ակումբ Վաղարշապատ) was an Armenian football club from the town of Vagharshapat (Etchmiadzin), Armavir Province.

== History ==
The club was founded in 2003 as FC Vagharshapat, and participated in the Armenian First League. The team achieved 2nd place in the league during its first season, but was unable to achieve promotion to the premier league. The following two seasons the club finished in 4th and 8th places respectively. In 2006 the club was unable to find a sponsor and disbanded.

== League record ==
| Year | Club Name | Division | Position | GP | W | D | L | GS | GA | PTS |
|---|---|---|---|---|---|---|---|---|---|---|
| 2003 | Vagharshapat | Armenian First League | 2 | 22 | 16 | 2 | 4 | 61 | 24 | 50 |
| 2004 | Vagharshapat | Armenian First League | 4 | 30 | 17 | 3 | 10 | 61 | 42 | 54 |
| 2005 | Vagharshapat | Armenian First League | 8 | 24 | 8 | 4 | 12 | 38 | 59 | 28 |
| 2006–present | Vagharshapat | no participation | | | | | | | | |
