= FC Dinamo Yeghvard =

Dinamo Yeghvard
- Full name: Football Club Dinamo Yeghvard
- Founded: 2002; 23 years ago
- Dissolved: 2003; 22 years ago
- Ground: Yeghvard City Stadium
- Capacity: 250

FC Dinamo Yeghvard (Armenian: Ֆուտբոլային Ակումբ Դինամո Եղվարդ), is a defunct Armenian football club from Yeghvard, Kotayk Province. The club was formed in 2002 and participated in the Armenian First League during the same year. However, the club was dissolved in 2003 prior to the kick-off of the First League.

== League record ==
| Year | Club Name | Division | Position | GP | W | D | L | GS | GA | PTS |
|---|---|---|---|---|---|---|---|---|---|---|
| 2002 | Dinamo Yeghvard | Armenian First League | 14 | 30 | 4 | 4 | 22 | 26 | 114 | 16 |
| 2003 | Dinamo Yeghvard | Armenian First League | - | - | - | - | - | - | - | - |
