= 2004 Armenian Premier League =

Armenian Premier League
- Season: 2004
- Dates: 8 April – 7 November 2004
- Champions: Pyunik
- Champions League: Pyunik
- UEFA Cup: Mika
- UEFA Intertoto Cup: Banants
- Matches played: 112
- Goals scored: 323 (2.88 per match)
- Top goalscorer: Galust Petrosyan (21); Edgar Manucharyan (21)
- Biggest home win: Pyunik 7-0 Dinamo-Zenit (28 October 2004)
- Biggest away win: Ararat Yerevan 1-6 Pyunik (25 June 2004); Kotayk 1-6 Pyunik (23 October 2004)
- Highest scoring: Pyunik 7-2 Kilikia (7 August 2004)
- All statistics correct as of 21 March 2023.

The 2004 Armenian Premier League season was the thirteenth since its establishment. It was contested by 8 teams, and Pyunik FC won the championship. No team was relegated this season, because the Football Federation of Armenia decided to increase the number of teams in the premier league from 8 to 9 for the 2005 season.

== Overview ==
- Kilikia FC are promoted.
- Dinamo-2000 change their name to Dinamo-Zenit Yerevan.
- Lernagorts Kapan changed their name to Lernagorts-Ararat Kapan.

== League standings ==
| Pos | Team | Pld | W | D | L | GF | GA | GD | Pts | Qualification |
|---|---|---|---|---|---|---|---|---|---|---|
| 1 | Pyunik (C) | 28 | 22 | 5 | 1 | 89 | 25 | +64 | 71 | Qualification for the Champions League first qualifying round |
| 2 | Mika Ashtarak | 28 | 16 | 7 | 5 | 41 | 23 | +18 | 55 | Qualification for the UEFA Cup first qualifying round |
| 3 | Banants | 28 | 12 | 7 | 9 | 40 | 39 | +1 | 43 | Qualification for the Intertoto Cup first round |
| 4 | Lernagorts-Ararat | 28 | 12 | 7 | 9 | 40 | 33 | +7 | 43 | |
| 5 | Dinamo-Zenit | 28 | 7 | 6 | 15 | 23 | 51 | −28 | 27 | |
| 6 | Kilikia | 28 | 7 | 5 | 16 | 32 | 49 | −17 | 26 | |
| 7 | Kotayk | 28 | 6 | 6 | 16 | 31 | 54 | −23 | 24 | |
| 8 | Shirak | 28 | 4 | 9 | 15 | 27 | 49 | −22 | 21 | |

Source: rsssf.com
(C) Champions

== Results ==
=== First half of season ===
| Home \ Away | BAN | DIN | KIL | KOT | LRG | MIK | PYU | SHI |
|---|---|---|---|---|---|---|---|---|
| Banants | | 2–0 | 1–0 | 2–1 | 3–2 | 0–1 | 1–3 | 1–1 |
| Dinamo-Zenit | 1–1 | | 1–0 | 2–1 | 0–0 | 2–1 | 2–2 | 0–1 |
| Kilikia | 4–0 | 2–3 | | 1–0 | 0–2 | 0–1 | 1–1 | 1–1 |
| Kotayk | 1–2 | 1–1 | 2–0 | | 0–2 | 1–3 | 1–6 | 3–3 |
| Lernagorts-Ararat | 1–0 | 1–1 | 3–2 | 5–1 | | 1–1 | 1–4 | 2–0 |
| Mika Ashtarak | 2–1 | 1–0 | 1–0 | 2–1 | 3–1 | | 2–2 | 2–1 |
| Pyunik | 3–0 | 3–0 | 7–2 | 3–1 | 3–1 | 3–1 | | 4–0 |
| Shirak | 1–2 | 0–1 | 3–4 | 1–1 | 2–2 | 0–1 | 0–1 | |

Legend: Blue = home team win; Yellow = draw; Red = away team win.

=== Second half of season ===
| Home \ Away | BAN | DIN | KIL | KOT | LRG | MIK | PYU | SHI |
|---|---|---|---|---|---|---|---|---|
| Banants | | 4–0 | 2–1 | 1–1 | 1–1 | 1–1 | 1–1 | 1–1 |
| Dinamo-Zenit | 0–3 | | 0–1 | 2–3 | 1–4 | 1–2 | 1–5 | 1–0 |
| Kilikia | 3–2 | 0–1 | | 2–3 | 0–0 | 1–1 | 2–2 | 2–1 |
| Kotayk | 0–2 | 2–1 | 2–0 | | 0–1 | 0–0 | 1–6 | 3–1 |
| Lernagorts-Ararat | 1–2 | 2–0 | 1–0 | 1–0 | | 0–2 | 1–2 | 3–0 |
| Mika Ashtarak | 4–0 | 1–0 | 5–1 | 1–1 | 2–0 | | 0–1 | 0–1 |
| Pyunik | 3–2 | 7–0 | 0–1 | 1–0 | 3–1 | 3–0 | | 6–1 |
| Shirak | 1–2 | 1–1 | 3–1 | 2–0 | 0–0 | 0–0 | 1–4 | |

Legend: Blue = home team win; Yellow = draw; Red = away team win.

== Season statistics ==
=== Top scorers ===
As of match played 7 November 2004

| Rank | Player | Club | Goals |
|---|---|---|---|
| 1 | (Armenia) Galust Petrosyan | Pyunik | 21 |
| 1 | (Armenia) Edgar Manucharyan | Pyunik | 21 |
| 3 | (Armenia) Nshan Erzrumyan | Kilikia | 18 |
| 4 | (Armenia) Levon Pachajyan | Pyunik | 13 |
| 5 | (Armenia) Armen Shahgeldyan | Mika | 12 |
| 6 | (Armenia) David Grigoryan | Mika | 11 |
| 7 | (Armenia) Mher Avanesyan | Ararat Yerevan | 8 |
| 7 | (Armenia) Samvel Melkonyan | Banants | 8 |
| 9 | (Armenia) Romeo Jenebyan | Banants | 7 |
| 9 | (Armenia) Yervand Hakobyan | Shirak | 7 |
| 9 | (Armenia) Arman Minasyan | Kotayk | 7 |

== See also ==
- 2004 in Armenian football
- 2004 Armenian First League
- 2004 Armenian Cup
