= 2003 Armenian Premier League =

Association football league season

The 2003 Armenian Premier League season was the twelfth since its establishment. It was contested by 12 teams, and Pyunik FC won the championship.

== Overview ==
- FC Armavir are promoted, but withdrew before the start of the season.
- FC Araks are promoted and replaced FC Armavir.
- Spartak Yerevan were dissolved and the players moved to Banants Yerevan.

== League table ==
Pos	Team	Pld	W	D	L	GF	GA	GD	Pts	Qualification or relegation
1	Pyunik (C)	28	23	5	0	87	11	+76	74	Qualification for the Champions League first qualifying round
2	Banants	28	21	3	4	89	15	+74	66	Qualification for the UEFA Cup first qualifying round
3	Shirak	28	17	2	9	63	34	+29	53	Qualification for the UEFA Cup first qualifying round
4	Mika Ashtarak	28	15	6	7	49	29	+20	51	Qualification for the UEFA Cup first qualifying round
5	Kotayk	28	8	7	13	29	56	−27	31	
6	Dinamo-2000 Yerevan	28	5	4	19	18	69	−51	19	
7	Lernagorts Kapan	28	3	6	19	20	72	−52	15	
8	Araks (R)	28	2	3	23	17	86	−69	9	Relegation to First League
9	Ararat Yerevan (E, R)	0	0	0	0	0	0	0	0	Expelled (Note: Ararat Yerevan were expelled before start of the season.)
10	Lernayin Artsakh (W)	0	0	0	0	0	0	0	0	Withdrew (Note: Lernayin Artsakh, Zvartnots-AAL and Armavir were withdraw before start of the season.)
11	Zvartnots-AAL (W)	0	0	0	0	0	0	0	0	Withdrew
12	Armavir (W)	0	0	0	0	0	0	0	0	Withdrew

Source: RSSSF
(C) Champions; (E) Expelled; (R) Relegated; (W) Withdrew

== Results ==
=== First half of season ===
Home \ Away	ARK	BAN	DIN	KOT	LRG	MIK	PYU	SHI
Araks		0–2	0–1	0–2	0–0	1–3	1–6	0–4
Banants	4–0		9–0	3–0	2–0	4–1	0–0	0–1
Dinamo-2000 Yerevan	3–1	1–3		0–1	1–1	3–2	0–4	0–1
Kotayk	2–0	0–2	1–2		2–0	0–2	1–1	3–3
Lernagorts Kapan	4–0	0–7	3–1	1–1		0–2	0–3	1–2
Mika Ashtarak	1–0	2–0	3–0	0–1	3–0		1–1	3–0
Pyunik	11–0	1–1	2–1	4–1	2–0	3–0		1–0
Shirak	4–0	1–2	1–0	5–3	5–0	2–0	0–2	

Source: RSSSF
Legend: Blue = home team win; Yellow = draw; Red = away team win.

=== Second half of season ===
Home \ Away	ARK	BAN	DIN	KOT	LRG	MIK	PYU	SHI
Araks		0–6	3–0	0–1	1–1	2–4	0–3	0–3
Banants	5–1		2–0	6–0	4–1	1–1	0–2	5–1
Dinamo-2000 Yerevan	2–2	0–5		0–0	0–3	0–3	0–2	1–3
Kotayk	3–1	0–3	0–0		0–0	2–2	0–4	1–3
Lernagorts Kapan	1–2	0–7	1–2	1–2		0–3	0–5	0–3
Mika Ashtarak	2–0	0–4	2–0	3–1	0–0		1–1	3–0
Pyunik	4–0	2–0	5–0	7–1	6–1	2–1		1–0
Shirak	4–2	0–2	6–0	3–0	6–1	1–1	1–2	

Source: RSSSF
Legend: Blue = home team win; Yellow = draw; Red = away team win.

== See also ==
- 2003 in Armenian football
- 2003 Armenian First League
- 2003 Armenian Cup
