= FC Lokomotiv Yerevan =

Lokomotiv Yerevan
- Full name: Football Club Lokomotiv Yerevan
- Founded: 1945; 81 years ago (original club) 2002; 24 years ago (current club)
- Dissolved: 2020; 6 years ago
- Ground: Mika Stadium, Yerevan
- Capacity: 7,250
- Owner: Hrach Kananyan
- President: Hrach Kananyan
- Manager: Anatoliy Piskovets
- League: Armenian First League
- 2019–20: 2nd
Home colours	Away colours

FC Lokomotiv Yerevan (Armenian: Ֆուտբոլային Ակումբ Լոկոմոտիվ Երևան), is a defunct Armenian football club from the capital Yerevan.

== History ==
During the Soviet rule, Lokomotiv Yerevan football team was formed in 1945 after World War II, representing the state railway department of the city of Yerevan. They won the Armenian Soviet Socialist Republic championship in 1963.

The current FC Lokomotiv Yerevan was founded in 2002 and participated in the Armenian First League during the same year. However, the club was dissolved in 2005 prior to the kick-off of the First League season, due to financial difficulties.

In April 2018, it was announced that Lokomotiv Yerevan has returned to professional football, planning to take part in the 2018–19 Armenian First League championship; the 2nd tier of the Armenian football league system. After returning to professional football, Lokomotiv played a friendly on 1 May 2018, defeating FC Ararat-2 by 2–1. In 2020, after the 2019-2020 Armenian First League season was abandoned, Lokomotiv were disqualified and are no longer active in professional competitions.

== League record ==
Year	Division	Position	GP	W	D	L	GS	GA	PTS	Notes
2002	Armenian First League	9	30	10	4	16	42	78	34	
2003	Armenian First League	4	22	12	3	7	46	33	39	
2004	Armenian First League	11	30	8	6	16	29	51	30	
2005–2018	no participation									
2018–19	Armenian First League	6	33	16	7	10	61	37	55	
2019–20	Armenian First League	2	27	22	4	1	76	23	70	
2020–present	no participation									

== Current squad ==
As of 17 April 2019

Note: Flags indicate national team as defined under FIFA eligibility rules; some limited exceptions apply. Players may hold more than one non-FIFA nationality.

No.	Pos.	Nation	Player
1	GK	UKR	Tymofiy Sheremeta
12	GK	UKR	Mykyta Savchenko
—	GK	ARM	Erik Khurshudyan
—	GK	ARM	Anushavan Tarverdyan
—	GK	ARM	Levon Ter-Minasyan*
4	DF	ARM	Aghavard Petrosyan
5	DF	ARM	Norayr Nikoghosyan*
20	DF	ARM	Vazgen Saribekyan*
—	DF	ARM	Vardan Safaryan
77	DF	ARM	Rafael Ghazaryan
6	MF	ARM	David Margaryan
8	MF	UKR	Oleh Lutsenko

No.	Pos.	Nation	Player
10	MF	ARM	Arsen Hovhannisyan
11	MF	ARM	Aram Sargsyan
12	MF	ARM	Roman Mikaelyan*
17	MF	ARM	Aram Khamoyan
18	MF	UKR	Denys Bondarenko
19	MF	ARM	Karen Nalbandyan*
90	MF	ARM	David Aslanyan
89	MF	UKR	Serhiy Dyachuk
99	MF	UKR	Dmytro Horstka
7	FW	ARM	Sevak Manucharyan
9	FW	ARM	Karapet Manukyan (captain)
16	FW	ARM	Gegham Tumbaryan

== Managerial history ==
Managers of FC Lokomotiv Yerevan since the club revived in 2018:

- (Armenia) Vahe Gevorgyan (1 April 2018 – 15 December 2018)
- (Ukraine) Anatoliy Piskovets (15 December 2018 – )
