= Arpa FC =

Armenian football club

Arpa FC (Armenian: Արփա Ֆուտբոլային Ակումբ), is a defunct Armenian football club from Yeghegnadzor, Vayots Dzor Province.

The club was founded as Momik FC in 1992. However, it was dissolved in early 2003 due to financial difficulties and is inactive from professional football.

== League record ==
Year	Club name	Division	Position	GP	W	D	L	GS	GA	PTS
1992	Momik FC	Armenian First League	18	26	5	7	14	28	52	17
1993	Momik FC	Armenian First League	8	22	7	1	14	26	49	15
1994	Arpa FC	Armenian First League	5	18	8	3	7	38	39	19
1995–1998	-	no participation	-	-	-	-	-	-	-	-
1999	Arpa FC	Armenian First League	8	16	2	2	12	11	46	8
2000	Arpa FC	Armenian First League	5	16	7	4	9	28	16	26
2001	-	no participation	-	-	-	-	-	-	-	-
2002	Arpa FC	Armenian First League	4	30	23	3	4	85	25	72
2003–present	-	no participation	-	-	-	-	-	-	-	-
