= 2005 Armenian Premier League =

Football league season

The 2005 Armenian Premier League season was the fourteenth since its establishment, and started on 12 April 2005. The last matches were played on 6 November 2005. FC Pyunik were the defending champions.

== Participating teams ==
Location of teams in the 2005 Armenian Premier League
- Lernayin Artsakh FC from Yerevan are promoted.
- FC Kotayk from Abovyan changed their name to Esteghlal-Kotayk.

Club	City	Stadium	Capacity
Banants	Yerevan	Nairi Stadium	6,850
Dinamo-Zenit	Yerevan	Republican Stadium	14,968
Esteghlal-Kotayk	Abovyan	Kotayk Stadium	5,500
Kilikia	Yerevan	Hrazdan Stadium	55,000
Lernagorts-Ararat Kapan	Kapan	Lernagorts Stadium	3,500
Lernayin Artsakh	Yerevan	Hrazdan Stadium	55,000
Mika Ashtarak	Ashtarak	Kasaghi Marzik Stadium	3,500
Pyunik	Yerevan	Republican Stadium	14,968
Shirak	Gyumri	Gyumri City Stadium	2,844

== Regular season ==
=== League table ===
Pos	Team	Pld	W	D	L	GF	GA	GD	Pts	Qualification
1	Pyunik	16	11	5	0	32	6	+26	38	Qualification for the Championship round
2	Mika Ashtarak	16	10	5	1	27	11	+16	35	Qualification for the Championship round
3	Banants	16	10	4	2	32	17	+15	34	Qualification for the Championship round
4	Esteghlal-Kotayk	16	7	7	2	28	15	+13	28	Qualification for the Championship round
5	Kilikia	16	6	3	7	29	25	+4	21	Qualification for the Championship round
6	Dinamo-Zenit	16	4	3	9	20	26	−6	15	Qualification for the Championship round
7	Shirak	16	3	2	11	18	34	−16	11	Qualification for the Relegation round
8	Lernagorts-Ararat	16	3	1	12	9	38	−29	10	Qualification for the Relegation round
9	Lernayin Artsakh	16	3	0	13	14	37	−23	9	Withdrew (Note: Lernayin Artsakh withdrew after 11 matches, remaining matches awarded 0-3 against them.)

==== Results ====
Home \ Away	BAN	DIN	KOT	KIL	LRG	LRY	MIK	PYU	SHI
Banants		3–1	1–0	2–0	4–1	3–0 (Note: Match awarded as Lernayin Artsakh withdrew after 12 rounds.)	0–2	2–5	1–0
Dinamo-Zenit	0–0		1–3	4–2	0–1	3–2	0–2	0–1	2–1
Esteghlal-Kotayk	1–1	1–0		2–2	1–1	3–0	0–0	0–0	3–0
Kilikia	0–1	0–0	4–3		5–0	1–0	0–2	0–3	4–2
Lernagorts-Ararat	1–2	0–4	1–3	0–5		0–2	0–1	0–3	1–0
Lernayin Artsakh	2–3	1–0	1–4	0–3	0–3		1–3	0–2	0–3
Mika Ashtarak	4–4	2–1	1–1	2–2	1–0	2–0		0–0	3–0
Pyunik	0–0	4–1	1–1	1–0	5–0	3–1	1–0		3–1
Shirak	0–5	3–3	1–2	3–1	2–0	1–4	1–2	0–0	

Legend: Blue = home team win; Yellow = draw; Red = away team win.

== Championship round ==
=== Championship round league table ===
The qualified teams only keep their head-to-head results to participate in the Championship stage, resulting in the following table.

Pos	Team	Pld	W	D	L	GF	GA	GD	Pts
1	Pyunik	10	6	4	0	16	4	+12	22
2	Mika Ashtarak	10	4	5	1	15	9	+6	17
3	Banants	10	4	4	2	14	13	+1	16
4	Esteghlal-Kotayk	10	2	6	2	12	11	+1	12
5	Kilikia	10	1	3	6	10	20	−10	6
6	Dinamo-Zenit	10	1	2	7	8	18	−10	5

=== Final classification ===
Pos	Team	Pld	W	D	L	GF	GA	GD	Pts	Qualification
1	Pyunik (C)	20	11	6	3	35	15	+20	39	Qualification for the Champions League first qualifying round
2	Mika Ashtarak	20	9	8	3	30	16	+14	35	Qualification for the UEFA Cup first qualifying round
3	Banants	20	9	6	5	31	27	+4	33	Qualification for the UEFA Cup first qualifying round
4	Esteghlal-Kotayk	20	8	7	5	22	19	+3	31	
5	Kilikia	20	4	5	11	20	32	−12	17	Qualification for the Intertoto Cup first round
6	Dinamo-Zenit	20	2	2	16	12	41	−29	8	

(C) Champions

==== Results ====
Home \ Away	BAN	DIN	KOT	KIL	MIK	PYU
Banants		1–0	4–1	1–3	1–2	2–1
Dinamo-Zenit	1–4		0–2	0–2	0–3	0–1
Esteghlal-Kotayk	0–0	1–0		2–0	0–2	2–1
Kilikia	0–1	3–1	0–1		0–0	1–4
Mika Ashtarak	4–1	1–2	1–0	0–0		1–2
Pyunik	2–2	5–0	0–1	2–1	1–1	

Legend: Blue = home team win; Yellow = draw; Red = away team win.

== Relegation round ==
=== Relegation round league table ===
The qualified teams kept their complete results before entering the stage. The team finishing in 7th position remained in the Premier League, the 8th ranked team played the promotion/relegation play-off, while the 9th team was relegated.

Pos	Team	Pld	W	D	L	GF	GA	GD	Pts	Qualification
7	Lernagorts-Ararat	18	4	2	12	11	39	−28	14	
8	Shirak (O)	18	3	3	12	19	36	−17	12	Qualification for the Relegation play-off
9	Lernayin Artsakh (W)	16	3	0	13	14	37	−23	9	Withdrew and relegated to First League

(O) Play-off winners; (W) Withdrew

=== Results ===
Team 1	Score	Team 2
Shirak	1–1	Lernagorts-Ararat
Lernagorts-Ararat	1–0	Shirak

== Relegation/Promotion play-off ==
Date	Venue	PL Club	Result	FL Club	Information
22 October	n/a	Shirak	5 - 1	Gandzasar	Shirak remains in the Premier League

== See also ==
- 2005 Armenian First League
- 2005 Armenian Cup
