= Spartak Yerevan FC =

Spartak Yerevan
- Full name: Spartak Yerevan Football Club
- Founded: 2000; 26 years ago
- Dissolved: 2003; 23 years ago
Home colours	Away colours

Spartak Yerevan FC (Armenian: Սպարտակ Երևան Ֆուտբոլային Ակումբ) was an Armenian professional football club based in Yerevan. The club competed in the Armenian Premier League.

== History ==
The club was founded in late 2000 as FC Araks-Impeks in the Armenian capital city of Yerevan. After taking over the rights of the financially struggling Araks Ararat FC to play in the Armenian Premier League, Araks-Impeks took part in the 2001 Armenian Premier League. On August 20, 2001, in the middle of the ongoing season, Araks-Impeks changed their name to Spartak Yerevan. After the 2003 season, following a merger with Banants to become the latter's reserve team, the club was dissolved.

== Record in European competitions ==
Season	Competition	Round	Club	Home	Away
2001–02	UEFA Champions League	1Q	(Moldova) Sheriff Tiraspol	0–1	0–2
2002–03	UEFA Cup	QR	(Switzerland) Servette	0–2	0–3
