= List of football clubs in Armenia =

This is a list of Armenian association football clubs.

== Active clubs ==
Premier League Clubs

- Alashkert
- Ararat-Armenia
- Ararat Yerevan
- BKMA
- Gandzasar Kapan
- Noah
- Pyunik
- Sardarapat
- Shirak
- Syunik
- Urartu
- Van

First League Clubs

- Andranik
- Ararat-Armenia-2 (reserve team)
- Ararat-2 (reserve team)
- Bentonit
- BKMA-2 (reserve team)
- Lernayin Artsakh
- Mika
- Sardarapat-2 (reserve team)
- Noah-2 (reserve team)
- Olimpia
- Pyunik-2 (reserve team)
- Shirak-2 (reserve team)
- Avshar Ararat
- Urartu-2 (reserve team)

A-League Clubs

- Kilikia
- Teghenis-Tsaghkadzor
- Fortuna Yerevan FC
- Artashat City
- Ejmiatsin SC
- Yeghegnadzor FC
- Ecoville
- Martuni Sport School

B-League Clubs

- FC Lori United
- Dilijan UWC
- Achajur
- Koghb United
- Aygavan Ararat
- Nairi
- Bentonit-Azatamut
- Araks FC
- FC Maralik-Ani
- FC Aratashen-Ndama
- Sebastia FC

== Inactive/Defunct clubs ==
- Abovyan
- Vayk
- Javakhk
- Akhtala
- Akhtamar
- Almast
- Ani
- Ayg
- Aragats
- Arabkir
- Aragats Gyumri
- Araks Yerevan
- Dilijan United
- Armavir
- Journalists
- Vachik
- Khor Virap
- Armenicum
- Arpa
- Aznavour
- Ajapnyak-Yerevan
- Byur
- BMA-Arai Echmiadzin
- Debed
- Dilijan
- Dinamo Yerevan
- Dinamo Yeghvard
- Dvin Artashat
- Erebuni
- Erebuni-Homenmen FC
- Falcons
- Hayq
- FIMA Yerevan
- Gazprom Armenia
- Garni
- Geghard
- Hachn
- Impuls
- Karin
- Kasakh
- Khimik Vanadzor
- King Delux
- Kumayri
- Kotayk
- Lernagorts Kapan
- Lernagorts Vardenis
- Lokomotiv Yerevan
- Lori
- Luys-Ararat
- Malatia
- Masis
- Moush Charentsavan
- Moush Kasagh
- Nig Aparan
- Nork Marash
- Noravank
- Onor
- Patani
- Real Army Food
- RUOR Yerevan
- State Revenue Comitee
- Sevan
- Shengavit
- Shinarar
- Sipan
- SKVV Yerevan
- Spitak
- Spartak Yerevan
- Torpedo Yerevan
- Tavush
- Tatev
- Tufagorts
- Tigranakert
- Ulisses
- Urmia Masis
- Vagharshapat
- Van Yerevan
- Vanadzor
- Voskevaz
- Yeghvard
- Yerevan
- Yerevan United
- Yezerk
- Zangezour
- Zvartnots-AAL
- Yerazank
- Makaravank
- Nikarm
- West Armenia
- FC Zenit Charentsavan
- FC Dinamo-VZ Yerevan
- Urozhai Yerevan
- Shinarar Yerevan
- Karmir Drosh Leninakan (Krasnoe Znamya)
- Tekstilshchik Leninakan
- Elektrotekhnik Yerevan
- Motor Yerevan
- Aeroflot Yerevan
- Zvezda Yerevan
- Zovuni
- Vedi FC
- FC Ijevan
- Himik Yerevan
- Metroschin Yerevan
- MBVD Yerevan
- Schweinik Spitak
- Iskra Yerevan

== See also ==
- Football Federation of Armenia
- Sport in Armenia
