= 1993 in Armenian football =

Premier League champions
- Ararat Yerevan

First League champions
- Zangezour; Lori

Armenian Cup winners
- Ararat Yerevan

1993 in Armenian football was the second season of independent football after the split-up from the Soviet Union. Professional football existed of two divisions, the Armenian Premier League (containing 16 teams) and the Armenian First League (2 groups of 14). Out of the 16 Premier League teams, three would relegate, while the two First League group winners along with the better runner-up would promote for the 1994 season.

== Premier League ==
- FC Ararat (from the town of Ararat) were promoted and changed their name to Tsement Ararat.
- Before the start of the season Syunik Kapan withdrew from competition.
- Kilikia F.C. merged with FC Malatia to form Malatia-Kilikia Yerevan (only for a single season).
- Nairi SC were renamed Nairit.
- Shengavit FC gave its license in the premier league to Yerazank FC.

== League table ==
Pos	Team	Pld	W	D	L	GF	GA	GD	Pts	Qualification or relegation
1	Ararat Yerevan (C)	28	23	5	0	92	9	+83	51	Qualification for the UEFA Cup preliminary round
2	Shirak	28	24	1	3	101	20	+81	49	
3	Banants Kotayk	28	23	2	3	111	21	+90	48	
4	Homenetmen Yerevan	28	21	3	4	80	29	+51	45	
5	Van Yerevan	28	15	2	11	71	49	+22	32	
6	Tsement Ararat	28	12	6	10	56	50	+6	30	
7	Homenmen-FIMA Yerevan	28	12	2	14	54	46	+8	26	
8	Yerazank	28	11	3	14	44	55	−11	25	
9	Nairit	28	8	4	16	29	61	−32	20	
10	KanAZ Yerevan	28	8	4	16	37	75	−38	20	
11	Kotayk	28	9	1	18	57	76	−19	19	
12	Impuls	28	8	2	18	42	89	−47	18	
13	Zvartnots Echmiadzin	28	6	4	18	42	78	−36	16	
14	Kasagh (R)	28	5	2	21	25	116	−91	12	Relegation to First League
15	Malatia-Kilikia Yerevan (R)	28	2	5	21	25	92	−67	9	Relegation to First League
16	Syunik Kapan (W)	0	–	–	–	–	–	—	0	Withdrew (Note: Syunik Kapan withdrew before start of the season.)

(C) Champions; (R) Relegated; (W) Withdrew

=== Top goalscorers ===
		Player	Team	Goals
1	(Armenia)	Andranik Hovsepyan	Banants Kotayk	26
	(Armenia)	Gegham Hovhannisyan	Homenetmen Yerevan	26
3	(Armenia)	Hovhannes Toumbaryan	Tsement Ararat	24
4	(Armenia)	Ara Evdokimov	Van Yerevan	21
5	(Armenia)	Vahe Yaghmuryan	Ararat Yerevan	20
	(Armenia)	Ashot Barseghyan	Banants Kotayk	20

== First League ==
- Zangezour FC (from Goris), FC Sipan (from Artik), and FIMA Yerevan are promoted from the Armenian Second league.
- Before the start of the season Debed FC, FC Nig Aparan, FC Geghard, FC Sipan, and Alashkert Martuni withdrew from the competition.
- FC Malatia merged with Kilikia F.C. to form Malatia-Kilikia Yerevan.
- Zoravan Yeghvard changed their name to FC Yeghvard.
- Urmia Masis changed their name to Masis.
- FC Vanadzor changed their name to Avtogen Vanadzor.
- Kaen Ijevan Changed their name to SKA Injevan.
- FC Moush Charentsavan, SKA Ijevan, FC Almast and RUOR Yerevan were disqualified at the end of the season. However, their existing records are not available.

=== League table, Group 1 ===
Pos	Team	Pld	W	D	L	GF	GA	GD	Pts	Promotion or qualification
1	Zangezour	22	16	2	4	46	19	+27	34	Promoted to Armenian Premier League
2	Artashat	22	14	5	3	56	22	+34	33	
3	Yeghvard	22	14	3	5	55	34	+21	31	
4	Akhtamar	22	13	3	6	45	16	+29	29	
5	FIMA Yerevan	22	11	4	7	45	29	+16	26	
6	Lernagorts Vardenis	22	9	1	12	42	45	−3	19	
7	Masis	22	7	5	10	27	51	−24	19	
8	Momik	22	7	1	14	26	49	−23	15	
9	Moush Charentsavan	0	-	-	-	-	-	—	0	Disqualified at the end of the season
10	BMA Ijevan	0	-	-	-	-	-	—	0	Disqualified at the end of the season
11	Almast	0	-	-	-	-	-	—	0	Disqualified at the end of the season
12	RUOR Yerevan	0	-	-	-	-	-	—	0	Disqualified at the end of the season
13	Debed	0	-	-	-	-	-	—	0	Withdrew before the start of the season
14	Nig Aparan	0	-	-	-	-	-	—	0	Withdrew before the start of the season

Source: rsssf.com

=== League table, Group 2 ===
Pos	Team	Pld	W	D	L	GF	GA	GD	Pts	Promotion or qualification
1	Lori	20	13	4	3	46	7	+39	30	Promoted to Armenian Premier League
2	Aznavour	20	13	1	6	45	21	+24	27	Promoted to Armenian Premier League
3	Araks Armavir	20	10	4	6	35	33	+2	24	
4	Karin	20	10	3	7	36	22	+14	23	
5	Aragats	20	10	3	7	40	27	+13	23	
6	Dinamo Yerevan	20	9	3	8	30	21	+9	21	
7	Avtogen Vanadzor	20	8	5	7	30	22	+8	21	
8	Kumayri	20	5	8	7	22	26	−4	18	
9	Luys-Ararat	20	6	4	10	33	32	+1	16	
10	Tufagorts	20	5	2	13	28	63	−35	12	
11	Hachen	20	2	1	17	10	71	−61	5	
12	Sipan	0	-	-	-	-	-	—	0	Withdrew before the start of the season
13	Geghard	0	-	-	-	-	-	—	0	Withdrew before the start of the season
14	Alashkert Martuni	0	-	-	-	-	-	—	0	Withdrew before the start of the season

Source: rsssf.com

=== Top goalscorers ===
		Player	Team	Goals
1	(Armenia)	Shirak Sarikyan	Aznavour	22

== Armenia Cup ==
Quarter finals		
Banants Kotayk	4 - 0; 7 - 0	Van Yerevan
Homenmen-FIMA	0 - 0; 1 - 3	Shirak
Ararat Yerevan	4 - 1; 3 - 1	Kotayk
Homenetmen Yerevan	1 - 0; 1 - 2	Tsement Ararat
Semi finals		
Shirak	2 - 1; 1 - 1	Banants Kotayk
Homenetmen Yerevan	2 - 2; 1 - 1	Ararat Yerevan
Final		
Ararat Yerevan	3 - 1	Shirak
