= 1992 in Armenian football =

Premier League champions
- Shirak; Homenetmen Yerevan

First League champions
- FC Ararat

Armenian Cup winners
- Banants Kotayk

1992 in Armenian football was the first season of independent football after the split-up from the Soviet Union. The league existed of two groups with 12 teams each. The top six of each group qualified for the Championship stage, while the others participated in the relegation stage. FC Shirak and Homenetmen Yerevan shared the championship as they both finished on 37 points in the Championship stage.

== Premier League ==
- Koshkagorts Yerevan had its name changed to Shengavit FC.
- Pahatsoyagorts Noyemberyan had its name changed to Aznavour FC.

=== First stage, Group 1 ===
==== League table ====
Pos	Team	Pld	W	D	L	GF	GA	GD	Pts	Qualification
1	Ararat Yerevan	22	17	3	2	84	18	+66	37	Qualification for the Championship round
2	Banants Kotayk	22	17	3	2	66	19	+47	37	Qualification for the Championship round
3	Homenetmen Yerevan	22	14	5	3	58	26	+32	33	Qualification for the Championship round
4	Syunik Kapan	22	13	5	4	63	43	+20	31	Qualification for the Championship round
5	Homenmen-FIMA Yerevan	22	9	6	7	33	26	+7	24	Qualification for the Championship round
6	Nairi	22	8	5	9	27	26	+1	21	Qualification for the Championship round
7	Malatia	22	7	6	9	34	42	−8	20	Qualification for the Relegation round
8	Zoravan Yegvard	22	8	1	13	39	43	−4	17	Qualification for the Relegation round
9	Lori Vanadzor	22	6	5	11	28	50	−22	17	Qualification for the Relegation round
10	Nig Aparan	22	5	1	16	21	60	−39	11	Qualification for the Relegation round
11	Alashkert Martuni	22	3	2	17	32	77	−45	8	Qualification for the Relegation round
12	Akhtamar	22	3	2	17	14	69	−55	8	Qualification for the Relegation round

=== First stage, Group 2 ===
==== League table ====
Pos	Team	Pld	W	D	L	GF	GA	GD	Pts	Qualification
1	Shirak	22	18	3	1	76	8	+68	39	Qualification for the Championship round
2	Kotayk	22	16	3	3	58	23	+35	35	Qualification for the Championship round
3	Van Yerevan	22	15	3	4	67	26	+41	33	Qualification for the Championship round
4	Kilikia	22	14	3	5	76	29	+47	31	Qualification for the Championship round
5	Zvartnots Echmiadzin	22	9	8	5	51	35	+16	26	Qualification for the Championship round
6	KanAZ Yerevan	22	10	5	7	49	37	+12	25	Qualification for the Championship round
7	Kasagh	22	8	6	8	32	37	−5	22	Qualification for the Relegation round
8	Shengavit	22	7	6	9	31	42	−11	20	Qualification for the Relegation round
9	Impuls	22	5	1	16	30	60	−30	11	Qualification for the Relegation round
10	Aznavour	22	3	5	14	25	47	−22	11	Qualification for the Relegation round
11	Araks Armavir	22	2	3	17	14	78	−64	7	Qualification for the Relegation round
12	Debed	22	1	2	19	25	112	−87	4	Qualification for the Relegation round

=== Second stage, Championship Group ===
The qualified teams kept their head-to-head results to participate in the Championship stage, resulting in the following starting table.

Pos	Team	Pld	W	D	L	GF	GA	GD	Pts
1	Shirak	10	8	2	0	23	3	+20	18
2	Homenetmen Yerevan	10	6	3	1	25	12	+13	15
3	Banants Kotayk	10	6	2	2	18	11	+7	14
4	Van Yerevan	10	6	1	3	16	13	+3	13
5	Ararat Yerevan	10	5	3	2	17	11	+6	13
6	Kotayk	10	5	2	3	15	11	+4	12
7	Syunik Kapan	10	3	3	4	19	20	−1	9
8	Kilikia	10	3	2	5	15	19	−4	8
9	Zvartnots Echmiadzin	10	1	4	5	13	22	−9	6
10	Homenmen-FIMA Yerevan	10	1	3	6	7	18	−11	5
11	Nairi	10	0	4	6	3	17	−14	4
12	KanAZ Yerevan	10	0	3	7	12	26	−14	3

=== Final table ===
Pos	Team	Pld	W	D	L	GF	GA	GD	Pts	Qualification
1	Shirak (C)	22	17	3	2	58	14	+44	37	Champions
1	Homenetmen Yerevan (C)	22	17	3	2	75	31	+44	37	Champions
3	Banants Kotayk	22	17	2	3	77	26	+51	36	
4	Ararat Yerevan	22	15	4	3	78	15	+63	34	
5	Van Yerevan	22	11	1	10	48	53	−5	23	
6	Syunik Kapan	22	8	3	11	42	47	−5	19	
7	Kotayk Abovyan	22	7	3	12	32	45	−13	17	
8	Nairi	22	6	5	11	26	52	−26	17	
9	Homenmen-FIMA Yerevan	22	6	4	12	39	42	−3	16	
10	Zvartnots Echmiadzin	22	3	5	14	30	61	−31	11	
11	KanAZ Yerevan	22	3	3	16	29	62	−33	9	
12	Kilikia	22	3	2	17	21	107	−86	8	

(C) Champions

=== Second stage, Relegation Group ===
The qualified teams kept their head-to-head results to participate in the Championship stage, resulting in the following starting table.

Pos	Team	Pld	W	D	L	GF	GA	GD	Pts
13	Kasagh	10	7	2	1	21	3	+18	16
14	Zoravan Yegvard	10	7	1	2	27	9	+18	15
15	Shengavit	10	6	3	1	20	6	+14	15
16	Malatia	10	5	3	2	20	14	+6	13
17	Lori Vanadzor	10	5	1	4	21	15	+6	11
18	Impuls	10	5	1	4	17	13	+4	11
19	Aznavour	10	3	4	3	17	12	+5	10
20	Nig Aparan	10	4	1	5	12	19	−7	9
21	Akhtamar	10	3	1	6	6	19	−13	7
22	Alashkert Martuni	10	2	1	7	10	20	−10	5
23	Araks Armavir	10	2	1	7	6	25	−19	5
24	Debed	10	1	1	8	9	31	−22	3

=== Final table ===
Pos	Team	Pld	W	D	L	GF	GA	GD	Pts	Qualification
13	Kasagh	22	15	3	4	60	26	+34	33	Join the Armenian Premier League for 1993
14	Shengavit	22	13	5	4	53	31	+22	31	Join the Armenian Premier League for 1993
15	Impuls	22	13	4	5	54	33	+21	30	Join the Armenian Premier League for 1993
16	Malatia	22	11	5	6	58	37	+21	27	Join the Armenian First League for 1993
17	Aznavour	22	11	5	6	45	29	+16	27	Join the Armenian First League for 1993
18	Zoravan Yegvard	22	10	4	8	49	39	+10	24	Join the Armenian First League for 1993
19	Lori Vanadzor	22	9	4	9	45	50	−5	22	Join the Armenian First League for 1993
20	Nig Aparan	22	6	3	13	35	52	−17	15	Join the Armenian First League for 1993
21	Araks Armavir	22	5	5	12	27	52	−25	15	Join the Armenian First League for 1993
22	Akhtamar	22	5	5	12	26	47	−21	15	Join the Armenian First League for 1993
23	Debed	22	4	5	13	32	65	−33	13	Join the Armenian First League for 1993
24	Alashkert Martuni	22	5	2	15	41	64	−23	12	Join the Armenian First League for 1993

== Top goalscorers ==
		Player	Team	Goals
1	(Armenia)	Vahe Yaghmuryan	FC Ararat Yerevan	38
2	(Armenia)	Ashot Barseghyan	Banants Kotayk	34
3	(Armenia)	Karen Markosyan	FC Ararat Yerevan	29
4	(Armenia)	Sergey Hayrbabamyan	Impulse FC	28
	(Armenia)	Gegham Hovhannisyan	FC Van Yerevan	28
6	(Armenia)	Rafael Hakobyan	Impulse FC	27
7	(Armenia)	Poghos Galstyan	Homenetmen Yerevan	26

== First League ==
=== First stage, Group 1 ===
Pos	Team	Pld	W	D	L	GF	GA	GD	Pts	Qualification
1	Geghard	18	15	0	3	54	19	+35	30	Qualify for Championship stage
2	FC Ararat	18	11	3	4	39	15	+24	25	Qualify for Championship stage
3	Aragats	18	11	3	4	37	14	+23	25	Qualify for Championship stage
4	Almast	18	10	3	5	41	27	+14	23	Qualify for Relegation stage
5	Hachen	18	8	6	4	32	25	+7	22	Qualify for Relegation stage
6	Tufagorts	18	6	2	10	30	32	−2	14	Qualify for Relegation stage
7	Vanadzor	18	5	3	10	17	31	−14	13	Qualify for Relegation stage
8	Dinamo Yerevan	18	2	8	8	20	27	−7	12	Qualify for Relegation stage
9	RUOR Yerevan	18	2	7	9	19	39	−20	11	Qualify for Relegation stage
10	Akhtala	18	1	3	14	18	68	−50	5	Qualify for Relegation stage

=== First stage, Group 2 ===
Pos	Team	Pld	W	D	L	GF	GA	GD	Pts	Qualification
1	Karin	18	11	5	2	52	25	+27	27	Qualify for Championship stage
2	Kumayri	18	11	2	5	33	18	+15	24	Qualify for Championship stage
3	Artashat	18	10	3	5	39	23	+16	23	Qualify for Championship stage
4	Luys Ararat	18	8	5	5	27	23	+4	21	Qualify for Relegation stage
5	Urmia Masis	18	7	6	5	25	16	+9	20	Qualify for Relegation stage
6	Kaen Ijevan	18	7	3	8	25	24	+1	17	Qualify for Relegation stage
7	Lernagorts Vardenis	18	6	4	8	31	36	−5	16	Qualify for Relegation stage
8	Moush Charentsavan	18	5	2	11	24	44	−20	12	Qualify for Relegation stage
9	Momik	18	3	5	10	17	43	−26	11	Qualify for Relegation stage
10	Shinarar	18	3	3	12	17	40	−23	9	Qualify for Relegation stage

=== Second stage, Championship Group ===
Pos	Team	Pld	W	D	L	GF	GA	GD	Pts	Promotion
1	FC Ararat	10	9	0	1	37	12	+25	18	Promoted to Armenian Premier League
2	Aragats	10	8	0	2	15	5	+10	16	
3	Karin	10	5	1	4	19	15	+4	11	
4	Artashat	10	4	0	6	16	26	−10	8	
5	Kumayri	10	3	1	6	14	20	−6	7	
6	Geghard	10	0	0	10	6	29	−23	0	

=== Second stage, Relegation Group ===
Pos	Team	Pld	W	D	L	GF	GA	GD	Pts	Relegation
7	Luys-Ararat	26	17	4	5	61	25	+36	38	
8	Almast	26	17	3	6	71	42	+29	37	
9	Kaen Ijevan	26	17	2	7	52	29	+23	36	
10	Moush Charentsavan	26	14	3	9	60	40	+20	31	
11	Lernagorts Vardenis	26	12	4	10	51	45	+6	28	
12	Hachen	26	9	9	8	39	44	−5	27	
13	Urmia Masis	26	10	6	10	41	33	+8	26	
14	Vanadzor	26	11	3	12	35	38	−3	25	
15	RUOR Yerevan	26	9	7	10	45	49	−4	25	
16	Dinamo Yerevan	26	8	9	9	37	42	−5	25	
17	Tufagorts	26	8	5	13	41	59	−18	21	
18	Momik	26	5	7	14	28	52	−24	17	
19	Akhtala	26	6	3	17	41	72	−31	15	Relegated to Armenian Second League
20	Shinarar	26	4	5	17	27	59	−32	13	Relegated to Armenian Second League

== Armenian Cup ==
=== Quarterfinals ===
FC Kotayk	1 – 2 1 – 0	Homenetmen Yerevan

Banants Kotayk	2 – 1 0 – 0	Kilikia

Van Yerevan	2 – 0 5 – 1	Zvartnots Echmiadzin

Shirak	4 – 0 7 – 2	Alashkert Martuni

=== Semifinals ===
Homenetmen Yerevan	3 – 0 0 – 2	Shirak

Van Yerevan	1 – 4 1 – 2	Banants Kotayk

=== Final ===
Banants Kotayk	2 – 0	Homenetmen Yerevan

== National Team ==
- Armenia played one international game in 1992.

=== Armenia vs Moldova ===
1992-10-14

Armenia	0 – 0	Moldova

Hrazdan Stadium, Yerevan
Attendance: 10,000
Referee: Balaian (ARM)

ARMENIA:
GK	Harutyun Abrahamyan
DF	Ashot Khachatryan
DF	Yervand Krbachyan
DF	Sargis Karapetyan
DF	Sargis Hovsepyan
MF	Artashes Adamyan	(substituted off) 62'
MF	Aramayis Tonoyan	(substituted off) 67'
MF	Arsen Avetisyan	(substituted off) 69'
MF	Samuel Kostandyan	(substituted off) 81'
FW	Mkrtich Hovhannisyan
FW	Armen Shahgeldyan
Substitutions:
MF	Ara Nigoyan	(substituted on) 62'
MF	Arthur Petrosyan	(substituted on) 67'
MF	Araik Avazyan	(substituted on) 69'
FW	Hovhannes Tahmazyan	(substituted on) 81'
Manager:
(Armenia) Eduard Markarov

MOLDOVA:
GK	Vasile Coşelev
DF	Alexandru Guzun
DF	Serghei Stroenco
DF	Ruslan Roic
DF	Emil Caras
MF	Alexandru Spiridon	(substituted off) 83'
MF	Iurie Skala	(substituted off) 85'
MF	Alexei Skala	(substituted off) 65'
MF	Igor Oprea	(substituted off) 58'
FW	Valeriu Căpătână	(substituted off) 78'
FW	Vladimir Kosse	(substituted off) 82'
Substitutions:
MF	Serghei Secu	(substituted on) 83'
MF	Igor Ovcearenko	(substituted on) 85'
MF	Radu Rebeja	(substituted on) 65'
MF	Igor Cuciuc	(substituted on) 58'
FW	Serghei Clescenco	(substituted on) 78'
FW	Iurie Miterev	(substituted on) 82'
Manager:
(Moldova) Ion Caras
