= 1994 in Armenian football =

Premier League champions
- Shirak

First League champions
- Aragats

Armenian Cup winners
- Ararat Yerevan

The 1994 season was the third season of football in Armenia following the break-up of the Soviet Union. Professional football consisted of two divisions, the Armenian Premier League (containing 16 teams) and the Armenian First League (ten teams). Out of the sixteen Premier League teams, five would be relegated, while only the First League winner would be promoted for the 1995 season, reducing the top level to twelve clubs.

== Premier League ==
- Zangezour FC, FC Lori and Aznavour FC were promoted.
- Before the start of the season Impulse FC withdrew from competition.
- FC Zvartnots Echmiadzin were renamed BMA-Arai Echmiadzin.

=== League table ===
Pos	Team	Pld	W	D	L	GF	GA	GD	Pts	Qualification or relegation
1	Shirak (C)	28	24	4	0	83	19	+64	52	Qualification for the UEFA Cup preliminary round
2	Homenetmen Yerevan	28	23	1	4	113	24	+89	47	
3	Ararat Yerevan	28	21	5	2	109	21	+88	47	Qualification for the Cup Winners' Cup qualifying round
4	Homenmen-FIMA Yerevan	28	15	6	7	65	45	+20	36	
5	Banants Kotayk	28	17	1	10	95	56	+39	35	
6	Tsement Ararat	28	11	6	11	54	49	+5	28	
7	Kotayk	28	12	3	13	73	53	+20	27	
8	Aznavour	28	11	3	14	43	72	−29	25	
9	Yerazank	28	9	5	14	29	50	−21	23	
10	Van Yerevan	28	9	4	15	34	72	−38	22	
11	Zangezour	28	9	4	15	25	77	−52	22	
12	Nairit (R)	28	7	6	15	22	43	−21	20	Relegation to First League
13	Lori Vanadzor (R)	28	5	6	17	22	65	−43	16	Relegation to First League
14	BMA-Arai Echmiadzin (R)	28	5	5	18	38	85	−47	15	Relegation to First League
15	KanAZ Yerevan (R)	28	1	3	24	15	89	−74	5	Relegation to First League
16	Impuls (W)	0	0	0	0	0	0	0	0	Withdrew (Note: Impuls withdrew before start of the season.)

Source: RSSSF
(C) Champions; (R) Relegated; (W) Withdrew

=== Top goalscorers ===
		Player	Team	Goals
1	(Armenia)	Arsen Avetisyan	Homenetmen Yerevan	39
2	(Armenia)	Henrik Berberyan	Kotayk	25
3	(Armenia)	Anushavan Pahlevanyan	Tsement Ararat	23
4	(Armenia)	Gegham Hovhannisyan	Homenetmen Yerevan	22
5	(Armenia)	Vahe Yaghmuryan	Ararat Yerevan	18

== First League ==
- BKMA Yerevan were promoted out of the Armenian Second League.
- Malatia-Kilikia Yerevan un-merged their original merger (FC Malatia and Kilikia F.C.) and once again became two different clubs. Neither of the two however participated in any competition in 1993.
- Before the start of the season Akhtamar Sevan, FC Artashat, FIMA Yerevan, FC Masis, Araks Armavir, FC Karin, FC Luys-Ararat and Hachen FC withdrew from competition.
- Lernagorts Vardenis FC changed their name to Sipan Vardenis.
- Momik FC of Yeghegnadzor changed their name to Arpa FC.
- Avtogen Vanadzor changed their name back to FC Vanadzor.

=== League table ===
Pos	Team	Pld	W	D	L	GF	GA	GD	Pts	Promotion
1	Aragats	18	15	1	2	69	19	+50	31	Promoted to Armenian Premier League
2	Kasakh	18	14	2	2	62	15	+47	30	
3	BKMA Yerevan	18	11	3	4	49	20	+29	25	
4	Dinamo Yerevan	18	9	5	4	49	32	+17	23	
5	Arpa	18	8	3	7	38	39	−1	19	
6	Kumayri	18	5	6	7	28	34	−6	16	
7	Yeghvard	18	5	0	13	34	64	−30	10	
8	Vanadzor	18	4	2	12	21	46	−25	10	
9	Tufagorts	18	3	3	12	23	70	−47	9	
10	Sipan Vardenis	18	3	1	14	20	54	−34	7	

Source: rsssf.com

== Armenia Cup ==
Quarter finals		
Shirak	7 - 0; 5 - 0	Arpa
Kotayk	0 - 5; 0 - 3	Homenetmen Yerevan
Homenmen-FIMA	0 - 3; 2 - 3	Banants Kotayk
Ararat Yerevan	3 - 1; 3 - 0	Yerazank
Semi finals		
Banants Kotayk	0 - 2; 2 - 2	Ararat Yerevan
Shirak	1 - 0; 1 - 2	Homenetmen Yerevan
Final		
Ararat Yerevan	1 - 0	Shirak
