= 1996–97 in Armenian football =

Premier League champions
- FC Pyunik

First League champions
- FC Dvin Artashat; FC Lori

Armenian Cup winners
- Ararat Yerevan

1996-97 in Armenian football was the 5th season of independent football after the split-up from the Soviet Union. It was the second out of two seasons in Armenia that were different from the others. Including the 1995-96 season these were the only winter competitions, while all other Armenian seasons were summer competitions. The Armenian Premier League for 1996-97 existed of 12 teams of which the four lowest ranked team would relegate to the Armenian First League. Only two Armenian First League teams would be promoted for the 1997 fall season, switching back to the winter competitions.

== Premier League ==
- FC Arabkir and BKMA Yerevan are promoted.

=== League table ===
Pos	Team	Pld	W	D	L	GF	GA	GD	Pts	Qualification or relegation
1	Pyunik (C)	22	19	2	1	67	9	+58	59	Qualification for the Champions League first qualifying round
2	Ararat Yerevan	22	17	1	4	54	18	+36	52	Qualification for the Cup Winners' Cup qualifying round
3	Yerevan	22	16	2	4	58	24	+34	50	Qualification for the UEFA Cup first qualifying round
4	Shirak	22	15	2	5	57	11	+46	47	
5	Tsement Ararat	22	13	3	6	49	26	+23	42	
6	Van Yerevan	22	11	1	10	41	34	+7	34	
7	Kotayk	22	8	4	10	41	27	+14	28	
8	Karabakh Yerevan	22	7	4	11	23	29	−6	25	
9	Homenmen Yerevan	22	7	1	14	30	59	−29	22	
10	Arabkir (R)	22	4	0	18	20	89	−69	12	Relegation to First League
11	Zangezour (R)	22	2	3	17	9	77	−68	9	Relegation to First League
12	BKMA Yerevan (W)	22	1	1	20	10	56	−46	4	Withdrew (Note: BKMA Yerevan were went into bankruptcy and withdrew from the competition after autumn season. All remaining matches were awarded 3-0 against them.)

(C) Champions; (R) Relegated; (W) Withdrew

=== Top goalscorers ===
		Player	Team	Goals
1	(Armenia)	Arsen Avetisyan	Pyunik	24
2	(Armenia)	Sergey Hayrbabamyan	Tsement Ararat	13
3	(Armenia)	Tigran Yesayan	Yerevan	11
	(Armenia)	Arthur Petrosyan	Shirak	11
	(Armenia)	Henrik Berberyan	Yerevan	11

== First League ==
- Kapan-81 are renamed Lernagorts Kapan.
- FC Kasakh returned to professional football and changed their name to Aragats Ashtarak.
- SKA Ijevan returned to professional football and change their name back to Kaen Ijevan.
- Hachen FC returned to professional football and changed their name to Sapfir FC.

=== League table ===
Pos	Team	Pld	W	D	L	GF	GA	GD	Pts	Promotion or qualification
1	Dvin Artashat	22	15	5	2	54	18	+36	50	Promoted to Armenian Premier League
2	Lori	22	15	5	2	42	13	+29	50	Promoted to Armenian Premier League
3	Aznavour	22	12	6	4	35	24	+11	42	
4	Nairit	22	9	7	6	48	32	+16	34	
5	Kumayri	22	8	5	9	47	42	+5	29	
6	Armavir	22	7	8	7	41	39	+2	29	
7	Sapfir	22	9	1	12	36	46	−10	28	
8	Dinamo Yerevan	22	7	4	11	23	41	−18	25	
9	Lernagorts Kapan	22	6	7	9	38	32	+6	25	
10	BMA-Arai Echmiadzin	22	6	7	9	24	28	−4	25	
11	Aragats Ashtarak	22	5	6	11	29	44	−15	21	
12	Kaen Ijevan	22	1	3	18	19	75	−56	6	
13	Aragats FC	0	–	–	–	–	–	—	0	Withdrew from competition
14	Astgh Vanadzor	0	–	–	–	–	–	—	0	Withdrew from competition
15	Yeghvard	0	–	–	–	–	–	—	0	Withdrew from competition

Source: rsssf.com

== Armenia Cup ==
Quarter finals		
Yerevan	3 - 1; 0 - 0	Van Yerevan
Pyunik	2 - 0; 5 - 2	Kotayk Abovyan
Shirak	1 - 1; 0 - 1	Ararat Yerevan
Tsement Ararat	w/o	BKMA Yerevan
Semi finals		
Yerevan	0 - 5; 1 - 2	Pyunik
Ararat Yerevan	2 - 0; 2 - 0	Tsement Ararat
Final		
Pyunik	0 - 1	Ararat Yerevan
