= 1995–96 in Armenian football =

Premier League champions
- Pyunik

First League champions
- Arabkir

Armenian Cup winners
- Pyunik

1995–96 in Armenian football was the fourth season of independent football after the split-up from the Soviet Union. It was the first of two seasons in Armenia that were different from the others. Including the 1996–97 season these were the only winter competitions, while all other Armenian seasons were summer competitions. The Armenian Premier League for 1995–96 consisted of 12 teams of which the lowest ranked team would relegate to the Armenian First League. The eleventh ranked team would face the second ranked team from the First League in a promotion/relegation play-off.

== Premier League ==
- Homenetmen Yerevan changed their name into FC Pyunik.
- Yerazank FC disbanded and yielded its place to another Artsakh Republic-based club from Stepanakert, FC Karabakh. Karabakh, much like Yerazank, were forced to relocate from Stepanakert to Yerevan due to the ongoing Nagorno-Karabakh conflict.
- FC Kotayk and Banants Kotayk merged, but the name of the merger was only limited to Kotayk Abovyan.
- Newly-founded FC Yerevan was unexpectedly promoted to replace Banants Kotayk.

=== League table ===
Pos	Team	Pld	W	D	L	GF	GA	GD	Pts	Qualification or relegation
1	Pyunik (C)	22	19	3	0	71	14	+57	60	Qualification for the UEFA Cup preliminary round
2	Shirak	22	16	3	3	67	23	+44	51	Qualification for the UEFA Cup preliminary round
3	Yerevan	22	13	5	4	43	24	+19	44	
4	Ararat Yerevan	22	12	3	7	58	28	+30	39	
5	Tsement Ararat	22	12	3	7	57	33	+24	39	
6	Kotayk	22	11	3	8	31	33	−2	36	Qualification for the Cup Winners' Cup qualifying round
7	Karabakh Yerevan	22	8	5	9	29	28	+1	29	
8	Van Yerevan	22	7	3	12	42	42	0	24	
9	Homenmen Yerevan	22	6	3	13	30	52	−22	21	
10	Zangezour	22	5	2	15	26	60	−34	17	
11	Aragats (R)	22	4	3	15	35	89	−54	15	Qualification for the Relegation play-off
12	Aznavour (R)	22	0	2	20	19	82	−63	2	Relegation to First League

(C) Champions; (R) Relegated

== Promotion and relegation play-off ==
Date	Venue	PL Team	Result	FL Team	Information
8 June	Yerevan	Aragats	0-4	BKMA Yerevan	BKMA Yerevan were promoted, Aragats were relegated.

=== Top goalscorers ===
		Player	Team	Goals
1	(Armenia)	Arayik Adamyan	Shirak	28
2	(Armenia)	Hovhannes Toumbaryan	Tsement Ararat	24
3	(Armenia)	Tigran Yesayan	Yerevan	20
4	(Armenia)	Arthur Petrosyan	Shirak	13
	(Armenia)	Arthur Manukyan	Zangezour	13

== First League ==
- Syunik Kapan returned to professional football and change their name to Kapan-81.

=== League table ===
Pos	Team	Pld	W	D	L	GF	GA	GD	Pts	Promotion or qualification
1	Arabkir	22	15	2	5	58	22	+36	47	Promoted to Armenian Premier League
2	BKMA Yerevan	22	13	5	4	63	17	+46	44	Forced to play the promotion/relegation play-off
3	Lori	22	12	6	4	33	16	+17	42	
4	Astgh Vanadzor	22	11	5	6	38	27	+11	38	
5	Armavir	22	10	6	6	45	33	+12	36	
6	Kumayri	22	11	2	9	33	25	+8	35	
7	Nairit	22	9	3	10	42	50	−8	30	
8	Kapan-81	22	8	5	9	32	33	−1	29	
9	Dvin Artashat	22	7	3	12	34	50	−16	24	
10	BMA-Arai Echmiadzin	22	7	2	13	26	44	−18	23	
11	Dinamo Yerevan	22	6	4	12	27	38	−11	22	
12	Yeghvard	22	1	1	20	17	91	−74	4	
13	Kasakh	0	–	–	–	–	–	—	0	Withdrew from competition
14	Tufagorts	0	–	–	–	–	–	—	0	Withdrew from competition
15	Lernagorts Vardenis	0	–	–	–	–	–	—	0	Withdrew from competition
16	Tsement-2 Ararat	0	–	–	–	–	–	—	0	Withdrew from competition

Source: rsssf.com

== Armenia Cup ==
Quarter finals		
Yerevan	0 - 1; 1 - 1	Shirak
Karabakh Yerevan	1 - 3; 1 - 0	Ararat Yerevan
Pyunik	2 - 0; 2 - 3	Tsement Ararat
Van Yerevan	1 - 0; 0 - 2	Kotayk Abovyan
Semi finals		
Shirak	0 - 1; 1 - 1	Kotayk Abovyan
Ararat Yerevan	0 - 2; 1 - 4	Pyunik
Final		
Pyunik	3 - 2	Kotayk Abovyan
