= 1997 in Armenian football =

Premier League champions
- Yerevan

First League champions
- Aragats

The 1997 season was the sixth season of independent football in Armenia following the split-up from the Soviet Union. It was the return to the summer competition format after using the winter competition format for two seasons. The Armenian Premier League for 1997 existed of 10 teams of which the lowest ranked team would relegate to the Armenian First League and would be replaced by the champions of that league.

== Premier League ==
- FC Dvin Artashat and FC Lori are promoted.
- FC Van Yerevan went into bankruptcy and disbanded.
- Homenmen Yerevan changed their name into Erebuni-Homenmen Yerevan.

=== League table ===
Pos	Team	Pld	W	D	L	GF	GA	GD	Pts	Qualification or relegation
1	Yerevan (C)	18	13	4	1	41	10	+31	43	Qualification for the Champions League first qualifying round
2	Shirak	18	12	5	1	46	8	+38	41	Qualification for the UEFA Cup first qualifying round
3	Erebuni-Homenmen	18	11	2	5	35	20	+15	35	Qualification for the Intertoto Cup first round
4	Pyunik	18	11	2	5	42	16	+26	35	
5	Tsement Ararat	18	8	3	7	28	27	+1	27	Qualification for the Cup Winners' Cup qualifying round
6	Ararat Yerevan	18	7	6	5	32	21	+11	27	
7	Kotayk	18	5	4	9	31	33	−2	19	
8	Karabakh Yerevan	18	5	3	10	13	28	−15	18	
9	Dvin Artashat (O)	18	1	4	13	16	52	−36	7	Qualification for the Relegation play-off
10	Lori Vanadzor (R)	18	0	1	17	7	76	−69	1	Relegation to First League
11	Van Yerevan (W)	0	–	–	–	–	–	—	0	Club dissolved (Note: Van Yerevan were went into bankruptcy and disbanded before the start of the season.)

Source: RSSSF
(C) Champions; (O) Play-off winners; (R) Relegated; (W) Withdrew

== Promotion and relegation play-off ==
Date	Venue	PL Team	Result	FL Team	Information
20 November	Abovyan	Dvin Artashat	3-1	Spitak	FC Dvin Artashat remain in the Premier League.

=== Top goalscorers ===
		Player	Team	Goals
1	(Armenia)	Arthur Petrosyan	Shirak	18
2	(Armenia)	Sevada Arzumanyan	Erebuni-Homenmen	13
3	(Armenia)	Mkrtich Hovhannisyan	Kotayk	11
4	(Armenia)	Varazdat Avetisyan	Pyunik	10
	(Armenia)	Tigran Yesayan	Yerevan	10

== First League ==
- Aragats FC returned to professional football.
- FC Spitak return to professional football.
- Zvartnots-AAL and Karabakh-2 Yerevan are introduced to the league.

=== League table ===
Pos	Team	Pld	W	D	L	GF	GA	GD	Pts	Promotion or qualification
1	Aragats	16	13	2	1	46	17	+29	41	Promoted to Armenian Premier League
2	Spitak	16	13	1	2	38	14	+24	40	Forced to play the promotion/relegation play-off
3	Lernagorts Kapan	16	12	1	3	63	18	+45	37	
4	Nairit	16	9	1	6	38	16	+22	28	
5	Dinamo Yerevan	16	4	2	10	18	47	−29	14	
6	Karabakh-2 Yerevan	16	4	1	11	21	39	−18	13	
7	BMA-Arai Echmiadzin	16	4	1	11	25	45	−20	13	
8	Aragats Ashtarak	16	3	3	10	16	36	−20	12	
9	Zvartnots-AAL	16	3	2	11	12	43	−31	11	
10	Armavir	0	–	–	–	–	–	—	0	Withdrew from competition
11	Kumayri	0	–	–	–	–	–	—	0	Withdrew from competition
12	Zangezour	0	–	–	–	–	–	—	0	Withdrew from competition
13	Aznavour	0	–	–	–	–	–	—	0	Withdrew from competition
14	Sapfir	0	–	–	–	–	–	—	0	Withdrew from competition
15	Kaen Ijevan	0	–	–	–	–	–	—	0	Withdrew from competition

Source: rsssf.com
