= 1993 Armenian Cup =

Tournament details
- Country: Armenia
- Teams: 31

Final positions
- Champions: Ararat Yerevan
- Runners-up: Shirak

Tournament statistics
- Matches played: 33
- Goals scored: 128 (3.88 per match)

The 1993 Armenian Cup was the second edition of the Armenian Cup, a football competition. In 1993, the tournament had 31 participant, of which only one was a reserve team.

== Results ==
=== First round ===
Banants Kotayk received a bye to the second round.

The matches were played on 27 and 29 March 1993.

Team 1	Score	Team 2
Aragats	w/o	Nairit
SKA Ijevan	0–1	Impulse
Artashat	0–10	Ararat Yerevan
Hachen	0–5	AOSS Yerevan
Lori	1–2	Shirak
RUOR Yerevan	1–7	Tsement Ararat
Almast	1–3	Kotayk
Yeghvard	0–1	ASS-SKIF Yerevan
Avtogen Vanadzor	0–6	Van Yerevan
Luys-Ararat	2–4 (aet)	Zvartnots Echmiadzin
Karin	1–2 (aet)	Kasakh Ashtarak
SKIF-2 Yerevan	1–2	Yerazank
Tufagorts	1–7	Kanaz Yerevan
Geghard	w/o	Malatia-Kilikia Yerevan
Lernagorts Vardenis	w/o	Akhtamar

=== Second round ===
The matches were played on 2 and 3 April 1993.

Team 1	Score	Team 2
Malatia-Kilikia	0–1	Ararat Yerevan
AOSS Yerevan	1–0	Kanaz Yerevan
Zvartnots Echmiadzin	0–2	Shirak
ASS-SKIF Yerevan	3–0	Akhtamar
Kasakh Ashtarak	1–5	Van Yerevan
Banants Kotayk	8–1	Impulse
Yerazank	1–1 (3–5 p)	Kotayk
Nairit	1–3	Tsement Ararat

=== Quarter-finals ===
The first legs were played on 6 April 1993. The second legs were played on 21 April 1993.

Team 1	Agg.	Team 2	1st leg	2nd leg
Banants Kotayk	11–0	Van Yerevan	4–0	7–0
ASS-SKIF Yerevan	1–3	Shirak	0–0	1–3
Ararat Yerevan	7–2	Kotayk	4–1	3–1
AOSS Yerevan	2–2 (a)	Tsement Ararat	1–0	1–2 (aet)

=== Semi-finals ===
The first legs were played on 30 April 1993. The second legs were played on 14 and 15 May 1993.

Team 1	Agg.	Team 2	1st leg	2nd leg
Shirak	3–2	Banants Kotayk	2–1	1–1
AOSS Yerevan	3–3 (a)	Ararat Yerevan	2–2	1–1

=== Final ===
25 May 1993

Ararat	3–1	Shirak
Mkhitaryan 30'; Shahgeldyan 77', 83'		Tahmazyan 27'

Hrazdan Stadium, Yerevan
Attendance: 7,000
Referee: Khazaryan (Yerevan)

== See also ==
- 1993 Armenian Premier League
