= 1995 in Armenian football =

Premier League champions
- None

First League champions
- None

Armenian Cup winners
- Ararat Yerevan

1995 in Armenian football was a transitional season. For this season the Armenian Premier League was composed of twelve clubs in two groups of six. No championship was awarded, and no teams were relegated or promoted.

== Premier League ==
- Aragats FC were promoted from the Armenian First League.
- Homenmen-FIMA Yerevan de-merged into 2 separate clubs: FIMA Yerevan and Homenmen Yerevan. FIMA Yerevan withdrew from the competition and retired from professional football for 3 seasons. (they returned to the Armenian First League in 1998). Homenmen entered the competition under the name Homenmen Yerevan.

=== League tables ===
==== Group 1 ====
Pos	Team	Pld	W	D	L	GF	GA	GD	Pts	Qualification
1	Shirak	10	7	3	0	23	6	+17	24	Group Champion
2	Tsement Ararat	10	5	1	4	19	12	+7	16	
3	Aznavour	10	4	1	5	10	14	−4	13	
4	Homenmen Yerevan	10	3	3	4	11	13	−2	12	
5	Zangezour	10	3	3	4	13	22	−9	12	
6	Yerazank	10	0	5	5	4	13	−9	5	

==== Group 2 ====
Pos	Team	Pld	W	D	L	GF	GA	GD	Pts	Qualification
1	Ararat Yerevan	10	6	2	2	34	11	+23	20	Group Champion
2	Homenetmen Yerevan	10	5	4	1	31	8	+23	19	
3	Kotayk	10	4	3	3	18	13	+5	15	
4	Van Yerevan	10	4	1	5	15	21	−6	13	
5	Aragats	10	2	3	5	14	31	−17	9	
6	Banants Kotayk	10	2	1	7	15	43	−28	7	

== First League ==
- Arpa FC withdrew from the competition.
- Kanaz Yerevan changed its name to FC Arabkir.
- FC Vanadzor changed its name to Astgh Vanadzor.
- Sipan Vardenis changed its name back to Lernagorts Vardenis FC.
- Araks Armavir returned to professional football and changed its name to FC Armavir.
- FC Artashat returned to professional football and changed its name to FC Dvin Artashat.
- Tsement-2 Ararat are brought up to make a 2-group, 16 team competition.

=== League tables ===
==== Group 1 ====
Pos	Team	Pld	W	D	L	GF	GA	GD	Pts	Qualification
1	BKMA Yerevan	12	8	3	1	26	7	+19	27	
2	Dinamo Yerevan	12	7	3	2	40	12	+28	24	
3	Yeghvard	12	6	1	5	29	20	+9	19	
4	Lori	12	6	0	6	24	16	+8	18	
5	Armavir	12	5	2	5	21	17	+4	17	
6	Kumayri	12	5	1	6	15	14	+1	16	
7	Tufagorts	12	0	0	12	9	78	−69	0	
8	Arpa	0	-	-	-	-	-	—	0	Withdrew from competition.

Source: rsssf.com

==== Group 2 ====
Pos	Team	Pld	W	D	L	GF	GA	GD	Pts
1	Arabkir	14	12	0	2	37	12	+25	36
2	Astgh Vanadzor	14	11	0	3	22	9	+13	33
3	BMA-Arai Echmiadzin	14	8	1	5	35	9	+26	25
4	Lernagorts Vardenis	14	7	2	5	20	27	−7	23
5	Dvin Artashat	14	5	2	7	19	21	−2	17
6	Nairit	14	5	1	8	18	19	−1	16
7	Tsement-2 Ararat	14	3	1	10	12	34	−22	10
8	Kasakh	14	1	1	12	10	42	−32	4

Source: rsssf.com

== Armenia Cup ==
Quarter finals		
Homenetmen Yerevan	1 - 2; 0 - 1	Shirak
Arabkir	0 - 2; 1 - 9	Ararat Yerevan
Homenmen Yerevan	2 - 0; 0 - 3	Tsement Ararat
Kotayk	3 - 0; 1 - 2	Kotayk-2
Semi finals		
Tsement Ararat	1 - 1; 0 - 3	Ararat Yerevan
Kotayk	2 - 1; 0 - 0	Shirak
Final		
Kotayk	2 - 4	Ararat Yerevan
