= 1992 Armenian Cup =

Tournament details
- Country: Armenia
- Teams: 31

Final positions
- Champions: Banants
- Runners-up: Homenetmen

Tournament statistics
- Matches played: 34
- Goals scored: 153 (4.5 per match)

The 1992 Armenian Cup was the first edition of the Armenian Cup, a football competition, since the Armenian independence. In 1992, the tournament had 31 participant, none of which were reserve teams.

== Results ==
=== First round ===
Malatia received a bye to the second round.

The matches were played on 4 and 6 April 1992.

Team 1	Score	Team 2
Nairi	2–3 (aet)	Syunik
Hachen	1–12	Ararat Yerevan
Ararat	0–6	Banants Kotayk
Almast	0–9	Kilikia
Karin	3–2	Araks Armavir
Shinarar	w/o	Van Yerevan
Artashat	w/o	Zvartnots Echmiadzin
Debed	1–7	Lori
Urmia Masis	0–6	Shirak
Kanaz	1–1 (5–4 p)	Zoravan Yeghvard
Moush Charentsavan	0–7	ASS-SKIF Yerevan
Alashkert	1–0	Koshkagorts
Kasakh Ashtarak	1–3	Homenetmen
Impulse	2–1	Paacoyagorz
Akhtamar	1–8	Kotayk

=== Second round ===
The matches were played on 14 and 16 April 1992.

Team 1	Score	Team 2
Syunik	0–1	Homenetmen
Ararat Yerevan	0–2	Banants Kotayk
ASS-SKIF Yerevan	0–1	Alashkert
Kilikia	6–0	Malatia
Van Yerevan	5–1	Karin
Lori	1–2	Zvartnots Echmiadzin
Shirak	7–1	Kanaz
Kotayk	7–0	Impulse

=== Quarter-finals ===
The first legs were played on 27 April 1992. The second legs were played on 6 and 7 May 1992.

Team 1	Agg.	Team 2	1st leg	2nd leg
Kotayk	2–2 (a)	Homenetmen	1–2	1–0
Banants Kotayk	2–1	Kilikia	2–1	0–0
Van Yerevan	7–1	Zvartnots Echmiadzin	2–0	5–1
Shirak	11–2	Alashkert	4–0	7–2

=== Semi-finals ===
The first legs were played on 18 May 1992. The second legs were played on 22 May 1992.

Team 1	Agg.	Team 2	1st leg	2nd leg
Homenetmen	3–2	Shirak	3–0	0–2
Van Yerevan	2–6	Banants Kotayk	1–4	1–2

=== Final ===
28 May 1992

Banants Kotayk	2–0	Homenetmen
Nigoyan 79'; Ash. Avetisyan 87'

Hrazdan Stadium, Yerevan
Attendance: 3,347
Referee: Khazaryan (Yerevan)

== See also ==
- 1992 Armenian Premier League
