= 1995–96 Armenian Cup =

Tournament details
- Country: Armenia
- Teams: 19

Final positions
- Champions: Pyunik
- Runners-up: Kotayk

Tournament statistics
- Matches played: 39
- Goals scored: 150 (3.85 per match)

The 1995–96 Armenian Cup was the fifth edition of the Armenian Cup, a football competition. In 1995–96, the tournament had 24 participants, none of which were reserve teams.

== Results ==
=== First round ===
Kapan-81, Vanadzor, Arabkir, Nairit, Karabakh Yerevan, Ararat Yerevan, Shirak and FC Yerevan received byes to the second round.

The first legs were played on 31 August 1995. The second legs were played on 14 September 1995.

| Team 1 | Agg. | Team 2 | 1st leg | 2nd leg |
|---|---|---|---|---|
| Kotayk | w/o | BMA-Arai Echmiadzin | n/a | n/a |
| Pyunik | 20–2 | Armavir | 11–1 | 9–1 |
| Homenmen | 12–2 | Dinamo | 4–0 | 8–2 |
| Aragats | 4–2 | BKMA Yerevan | 3–0 | 2–1 |
| Van Yerevan | 11–1 | Dvin Artashat | 7–1 | 4–1 |
| Zangezour | w/o | Yeghvard | n/a | n/a |
| Aznavour | w/o | Kumayri | n/a | n/a |
| Tsement | w/o | Lori | n/a | n/a |

=== Second round ===
The first legs were played on 1 March 1996. The second legs were played on 6 and 8 March 1996.

| Team 1 | Agg. | Team 2 | 1st leg | 2nd leg |
|---|---|---|---|---|
| Kapan-81 | 1–8 | Ararat Yerevan | 0–2 | 1–6 |
| Vanadzor | 0–8 | Shirak | 0–5 | 0–3 |
| Zangezour | 0–7 | Van Yerevan | 0–3 | 0–4 |
| Tsement | 10–1 | Aznavour | 6–0 | 4–1 |
| Aragats | 1–10 | Pyunik | 0–4 | 1–6 |
| Kotayk | 6–1 | Homenmen | 5–1 | 1–0 |
| Arabkir | 0–10 | Yerevan | 0–6 | 0–4 |
| Karabakh | w/o | Nairit | n/a | n/a |

=== Quarter-finals ===
The first legs were played on 1 and 2 April 1996. The second legs were played on 5 and 13 April 1996.

| Team 1 | Agg. | Team 2 | 1st leg | 2nd leg |
|---|---|---|---|---|
| Yerevan | 1–2 | Shirak | 0–1 | 1–1 |
| Karabakh | 2–3 | Ararat Yerevan | 1–3 | 1–0 |
| Pyunik | 4–3 | Tsement | 2–0 | 2–3 |
| Van Yerevan | 1–2 | Kotayk | 1–0 | 0–2 |

=== Semi-finals ===
The first legs were played on 3 and 4 May 1996. The second legs were played on 13 and 14 May 1996.

| Team 1 | Agg. | Team 2 | 1st leg | 2nd leg |
|---|---|---|---|---|
| Shirak | 1–2 | Kotayk | 1–1 | 0–1 |
| Ararat | 1–6 | Pyunik | 0–2 | 1–4 |

=== Final ===
28 May 1996

| Pyunik | 3 – 2 | Kotayk |
|---|---|---|
| Mkhitaryan 45'; A. Avetisyan 54'; Khachatryan 58' | | Mirzoyan 84'; Sargisyan 85' |

Hrazdan Stadium, Yerevan
Attendance: 3,000
Referee: Gevorg Oganesyan (Yerevan)

== See also ==
- 1995–96 Armenian Premier League
