= 1996–97 Armenian Cup =

Tournament details
- Country: Armenia
- Teams: 19

Final positions
- Champions: Ararat
- Runners-up: Pyunik

Tournament statistics
- Matches played: 28
- Goals scored: 107 (3.82 per match)

The 1996–97 Armenian Cup was the sixth edition of the Armenian Cup, a football competition. In 1996–97, the tournament had 24 participants, none of which were reserve teams.

== Results ==
=== First round ===
FC Yerevan, Karabakh Yerevan, Pyunik, Van Yerevan, Kotayk, Tsement, Shirak and Ararat Yerevan received byes to the second round.

The first legs were played on 1 and 2 October 1996. The second legs were played on 9 and 10 October 1996.

Team 1	Agg.	Team 2	1st leg	2nd leg
Zangezour	w/o	Arabkir	n/a	n/a
Kumayri	w/o	Aznavour	n/a	n/a
Kapan-81	w/o	Nairit	n/a	n/a
Dinamo Yerevan	w/o	Kaen Ijevan	n/a	n/a
Kasakh	2–0	Sapfir	2–0	n/a
BMA-Arai Echmiadzin	3–4	Dvin Artashat	3–4	n/a
Lori	4–2	Armavir	1–0	3–2
BKMA Yerevan	6–2	Homenmen	0–2	6–0

=== Second round ===
The first legs were played on 19, 20 October and 2 November 1996. The second legs were played on 2, 3 and 14 November 1996.

Team 1	Agg.	Team 2	1st leg	2nd leg
Yerevan	w/o	Kapan-81	n/a	n/a
Karabakh	w/o	BKMA Yerevan	n/a	n/a
Pyunik	7–1	Zangezour	5–0	2–1
Kasakh	0–7	Van Yerevan	0–7	n/a
Kotayk	4–3	Aznavour	3–0	1–3
Lori	1–5	Tsement	0–1	1–4
Dinamo Yerevan	1–21	Shirak	0–9	1–12
Dvin Artashat	2–3	Ararat Yerevan	2–3	0–0

=== Quarter-finals ===
The first legs were played on 26 March 1997. The second legs were played on 8 April 1997.

Team 1	Agg.	Team 2	1st leg	2nd leg
Yerevan	3–1	Van Yerevan	3–1	0–0
Pyunik	7–2	Kotayk	2–0	5–2
Shirak	1–2	Ararat Yerevan	1–1	0–1
Tsement	w/o	BKMA Yerevan	n/a	n/a

=== Semi-finals ===
The first legs were played on 13 May 1997. The second legs were played on 18 May 1997.

Team 1	Agg.	Team 2	1st leg	2nd leg
Yerevan	1–7	Pyunik	0–5	1–2
Ararat Yerevan	4–0	Tsement	2–0	2–0

=== Final ===
28 May 1997

Ararat Yerevan	1 – 0	Pyunik
Babayan 6'

Hrazdan Stadium, Yerevan
Attendance: 4,500
Referee: Khazaryan (Yerevan)

== See also ==
- 1996–97 Armenian Premier League
