= 1992 Armenian Premier League =

Football league season

Statistics of Armenian Premier League in the 1992 season.

- Koshkagorts Yerevan had its name changed to Shengavit FC Yerevan.
- Pahatsoyagorts Noyemberyan had its name changed to Aznavour FC Noyemberyan.

== Teams ==
Locations of the 1992 Armenian Premier League teams

== Regular season ==
=== Group 1 ===
==== League table ====
Pos	Team	Pld	W	D	L	GF	GA	GD	Pts	Qualification
1	Ararat Yerevan	22	17	3	2	84	18	+66	37	Qualification for the Championship round
2	Banants Kotayk	22	17	3	2	66	19	+47	37	Qualification for the Championship round
3	Homenetmen Yerevan	22	14	5	3	58	26	+32	33	Qualification for the Championship round
4	Syunik Kapan	22	13	5	4	63	43	+20	31	Qualification for the Championship round
5	Homenmen-FIMA Yerevan	22	9	6	7	33	26	+7	24	Qualification for the Championship round
6	Nairi	22	8	5	9	27	26	+1	21	Qualification for the Championship round
7	Malatia	22	7	6	9	34	42	−8	20	Qualification for the Relegation round
8	Zoravan Yegvard	22	8	1	13	39	43	−4	17	Qualification for the Relegation round
9	Lori Vanadzor	22	6	5	11	28	50	−22	17	Qualification for the Relegation round
10	Nig Aparan	22	5	1	16	21	60	−39	11	Qualification for the Relegation round
11	Alashkert Martuni	22	3	2	17	32	77	−45	8	Qualification for the Relegation round
12	Akhtamar	22	3	2	17	14	69	−55	8	Qualification for the Relegation round

Source: RSSSF

==== Results ====
Home \ Away	ALA	AKH	ARA	BAN	HOM	HMT	LOR	NAI	NIG	MAL	SYU	ZOR
Alashkert Martuni		0–1	2–3	0–3	1–1	2–4	0–2	4–3	1–2	0–3	8–9	2–1
Akhtamar	1–3		0–4	2–3	0–1	0–3	3–0 (Note: Match awarded.)	0–0	2–1	2–2	1–2	0–2
Ararat Yerevan	10–2	18–0		0–0	2–1	1–1	4–0	2–0	5–1	4–0	5–2	5–0
Banants Kotayq	7–1	4–0	0–3		5–0	1–0	10–0	3–0	6–0	5–1	2–0	4–2
Homenmen-FIMA Yerevan	4–0	3–1	2–1	1–2		1–3	0–0	0–0	5–1	2–1	0–1	3–0
Homenetmen Yerevan	6–0	5–0	1–1	2–2	2–0		1–1	6–1	2–1	1–2	6–5	2–1
Lori Vanadzor	5–1	4–0	1–5	0–1	0–0	2–1		0–1	3–2	1–4	2–2	1–1
Nairi	4–0	4–1	0–1	1–2	0–0	0–2	1–0		2–0	3–0	0–0	1–0
Nig Aparan	2–1	1–0	0–3	1–2	0–5	1–3	1–2	1–0		0–2	2–3	1–0
Malatia	2–2	2–0	1–3	0–0	1–2	2–2	2–1	2–0	1–1		3–3	1–4
Syunik Kapan	3–2	3–0	4–1	4–1	2–2	0–2	6–1	1–1	5–1	3–1		3–2
Zoravan Yegvard	1–0	4–0	0–3	1–3	3–0	2–3	4–2	1–5	7–1	3–1	0–2	

Source: RSSSF
Legend: Blue = home team win; Yellow = draw; Red = away team win.

=== Group 2 ===
==== League table ====
Pos	Team	Pld	W	D	L	GF	GA	GD	Pts	Qualification
1	Shirak	22	18	3	1	76	8	+68	39	Qualification for the Championship round
2	Kotayk	22	16	3	3	58	23	+35	35	Qualification for the Championship round
3	Van Yerevan	22	15	3	4	67	26	+41	33	Qualification for the Championship round
4	Kilikia	22	14	3	5	76	29	+47	31	Qualification for the Championship round
5	Zvartnots Echmiadzin	22	9	8	5	51	35	+16	26	Qualification for the Championship round
6	KanAZ Yerevan	22	10	5	7	49	37	+12	25	Qualification for the Championship round
7	Kasagh	22	8	6	8	32	37	−5	22	Qualification for the Relegation round
8	Shengavit	22	7	6	9	31	42	−11	20	Qualification for the Relegation round
9	Impuls	22	5	1	16	30	60	−30	11	Qualification for the Relegation round
10	Aznavour	22	3	5	14	25	47	−22	11	Qualification for the Relegation round
11	Araks Armavir	22	2	3	17	14	78	−64	7	Qualification for the Relegation round
12	Debed	22	1	2	19	25	112	−87	4	Qualification for the Relegation round

Source: RSSSF

==== Results ====
Home \ Away	ARM	AZN	DEB	IMP	KAN	KAS	KIL	KOT	SHE	SHI	VAN	ZVA
Araks Armawir		0–4	1–0	0–3	0–3	0–2	0–9	1–1	0–4	0–6	1–4	2–2
Aznavour	3–3		3–1	2–0	0–1	0–0	0–4	1–2	1–1	1–3	0–2	1–1
Debed	3–2	1–1		3–4	3–7	0–2	2–2	2–6	0–3	1–6	3–8	3–6
Impuls	0–3 (Note: Match awarded)	3–2	4–0		5–6	1–4	1–4	1–3	1–0	0–3	1–5	1–2
KanAZ Yerevan	4–0	2–1	8–0	3–1		0–0	2–2	0–3	1–1	0–1	2–3	1–1
Kasagh	3–0	1–0	8–0	1–0	0–1		2–10	3–4	1–1	0–0	3–2	1–1
Kilikia	3–0	3–1	9–0	3–2	3–2	5–1		2–1	6–0	0–1	1–2	5–4
Kotayk	3–0	2–0	9–1	2–1	2–1	4–0	2–1		2–0	0–2	4–1	2–1
Shengavit	4–0	2–1	3–1	1–1	0–1	1–0	1–3	2–5		2–1	2–6	1–1
Shirak	7–0	5–1	9–0	3–0	8–2	4–0	1–0	0–0	6–0		2–0	6–1
Van Yerevan	6–0	7–2	4–0	6–0	2–1	0–0	3–0	2–0	1–1	0–0		2–1
Zvartnots Echmiadzin	5–1	3–0	7–1	4–0	1–1	3–1	1–1	1–1	3–1	0–2	2–1	

Source: RSSSF
Legend: Blue = home team win; Yellow = draw; Red = away team win.

== Championship round ==
=== Championship round starting table ===
The qualified teams kept their head-to-head results to participate in the Championship round, resulting in the following starting table.

Pos	Team	Pld	W	D	L	GF	GA	GD	Pts
1	Shirak	10	8	2	0	23	3	+20	18
2	Homenetmen Yerevan	10	6	3	1	25	12	+13	15
3	Banants Kotayk	10	6	2	2	18	11	+7	14
4	Van Yerevan	10	6	1	3	16	13	+3	13
5	Ararat Yerevan	10	5	3	2	17	11	+6	13
6	Kotayk	10	5	2	3	15	11	+4	12
7	Syunik Kapan	10	3	3	4	19	20	−1	9
8	Kilikia	10	3	2	5	15	19	−4	8
9	Zvartnots Echmiadzin	10	1	4	5	13	22	−9	6
10	Homenmen-FIMA Yerevan	10	1	3	6	7	18	−11	5
11	Nairi	10	0	4	6	3	17	−14	4
12	KanAZ Yerevan	10	0	3	7	12	26	−14	3

Source: RSSSF

=== Championship round final table ===
Pos	Team	Pld	W	D	L	GF	GA	GD	Pts	Qualification
1	Shirak (C)	22	17	3	2	58	14	+44	37	Champions
1	Homenetmen Yerevan (C)	22	17	3	2	75	31	+44	37	Champions
3	Banants Kotayk	22	17	2	3	77	26	+51	36	
4	Ararat Yerevan	22	15	4	3	78	15	+63	34	
5	Van Yerevan	22	11	1	10	48	53	−5	23	
6	Syunik Kapan	22	8	3	11	42	47	−5	19	
7	Kotayk Abovyan	22	7	3	12	32	45	−13	17	
8	Nairi	22	6	5	11	26	52	−26	17	
9	Homenmen-FIMA Yerevan	22	6	4	12	39	42	−3	16	
10	Zvartnots Echmiadzin	22	3	5	14	30	61	−31	11	
11	KanAZ Yerevan	22	3	3	16	29	62	−33	9	
12	Kilikia	22	3	2	17	21	107	−86	8	

Source: RSSSF
(C) Champions

==== Results ====
Home \ Away	ARA	BAN	HOM	HMT	KAN	KIL	KOT	NAI	SHI	SYU	VAN	ZVA
Ararat Yerevan					5–0	10–0	3–0		0–0		7–0	7–2
FC Banants Kotayk					5–0	12–0	4–2		3–1		7–1	5–1
Homenmen-FIMA Yerevan					1–2	5–1	2–2		1–3		2–5	2–1
Homenetmen Yerevan					2–1	5–0	3–2		3–1		7–5	6–0
KanAZ Yerevan	2–7	1–6	1–3	1–2				3–0		1–2		
Kilikia	0–12	1–7	0–11	1–12				0–3		0–4		
Kotayk	0–7	1–2	1–2	0–3				3–2		6–2		
Nairi					3–2	4–3	1–0		0–5		2–6	3–2
Shirak	– (Note: The match between Shirak and Ararat Yerevan was rated with 2–0 points.)	3–0	3–1	4–1				7–0		3–0 (Note: Match awarded.)		
Syunik Kapan					0–3	3–0	3–0		2–5		1–2	3–0
Van Yerevan	0–1	2–4	2–1	2–3				3–4		4–1		
Zvartnots Echmiadzin	0–2	1–4	3–1	2–3				1–1		3–2		

Source: RSSSF
Legend: Blue = home team win; Yellow = draw; Red = away team win.

== Relegation round ==
=== Relegation round starting table ===
The qualified teams kept their head-to-head results to participate in the Relegation round, resulting in the following starting table.

Pos	Team	Pld	W	D	L	GF	GA	GD	Pts
13	Kasagh	10	7	2	1	21	3	+18	16
14	Zoravan Yegvard	10	7	1	2	27	9	+18	15
15	Shengavit	10	6	3	1	20	6	+14	15
16	Malatia	10	5	3	2	20	14	+6	13
17	Lori Vanadzor	10	5	1	4	21	15	+6	11
18	Impuls	10	5	1	4	17	13	+4	11
19	Aznavour	10	3	4	3	17	12	+5	10
20	Nig Aparan	10	4	1	5	12	19	−7	9
21	Akhtamar	10	3	1	6	6	19	−13	7
22	Alashkert Martuni	10	2	1	7	10	20	−10	5
23	Araks Armavir	10	2	1	7	6	25	−19	5
24	Debed	10	1	1	8	9	31	−22	3

Source: RSSSF

=== Relegation round final table ===
Pos	Team	Pld	W	D	L	GF	GA	GD	Pts	Qualification
13	Kasagh	22	15	3	4	60	26	+34	33	Join the Armenian Premier League for 1993
14	Shengavit	22	13	5	4	53	31	+22	31	Join the Armenian Premier League for 1993
15	Impuls	22	13	4	5	54	33	+21	30	Join the Armenian Premier League for 1993
16	Malatia	22	11	5	6	58	37	+21	27	Join the Armenian First League for 1993
17	Aznavour	22	11	5	6	42	29	+13	27	Join the Armenian First League for 1993
18	Zoravan Yegvard	22	10	4	8	49	39	+10	24	Join the Armenian First League for 1993
19	Lori Vanadzor	22	9	4	9	45	63	−18	22	Join the Armenian First League for 1993
20	Nig Aparan	22	6	3	13	35	52	−17	15	Join the Armenian First League for 1993
21	Araks Armavir	22	5	5	12	28	57	−29	15	Join the Armenian First League for 1993
22	Akhtamar	22	5	5	12	28	42	−14	15	Join the Armenian First League for 1993
23	Debed	22	4	5	13	35	68	−33	13	Join the Armenian First League for 1993
24	Alashkert Martuni	22	5	2	15	38	58	−20	12	Join the Armenian First League for 1993

Source: RSSSF

==== Results ====
Home \ Away	ALA	AKH	ARM	AZN	DEB	IMP	KAS	LOR	MAL	NIG	SHE	ZOR
Alashkert			4–2	4–0	5–1	3–4	2–4				3–4	
Akhtamar			2–1	0–1	5–2	2–3	1–1				1–2	
Araks Armavir	6–2	3–0						1–1	2–2	2–1		2–2
Aznavour	3–0 (Note: Match awarded.)	1–1						6–1	4–1	3–1		2–1
Debed	1–1	1–0						3–2	3–3	3–3		4–0
Impuls	3–1	1–1						3–1	3–0	5–0		7–3
Kasagh	6–2	6–5						9–2	2–3	4–2		2–0
Lori Vanadzor	3–3	5–1		2–1		1–1	2–1				4–2	
Malatia			9–0	3–0	7–2	4–2	0–1				5–2	
Nig Aparan			2–2	3–5	4–2	2–3	1–2				0–3	
Shengavit	7–1	1–1						4–0	2–1	2–1		4–4
Zoravan Yegvard			2–0	0–2	4–1	2–2	3–1				1–3	

Source: RSSSF
Legend: Blue = home team win; Yellow = draw; Red = away team win.

== Top goalscorers ==
#	Player		Team	Goals
1	(Armenia)	Vahe Yaghmuryan	Ararat Yerevan	38
2	(Armenia)	Ashot Barseghyan	Banants Kotayk	34
3	(Armenia)	Karen Markosyan	Ararat Yerevan	29
4	(Armenia)	Sergey Hayrbabamyan	Impuls	28
4	(Armenia)	Gegham Hovhannisyan	Van Yerevan	28
6	(Armenia)	Rafael Hakobyan	Impuls	27
7	(Armenia)	Poghos Galstyan	Homenetmen Yerevan	26

Source: RSSSF

== See also ==
- 1992 in Armenian football
- 1992 Armenian First League
- 1992 Armenian Cup
