= Yerevan (disambiguation) =

Yerevan is the capital of Armenia.

Yerevan may also refer to:

== Places ==
- Yerevan Botanical Garden
- Yerevan Cascade, a giant stairway in Yerevan, Armenia
- Yerevan Fortress, a 16th-century fortress in Yerevan
- Yerevan History Museum
- Yerevan Lake, a lake in Yerevan
- Yerevan Metro
- Yerevan Square, a major square in Tbilisi, Georgia now renamed Freedom Square
- Yerevan TV Tower
- Yerevan Velodrome, an outdoor velodrome or track cycling venue in Yerevan, Armenia
- Yerevan Zoo, a zoological garden of Yerevan

== Brand names ==
- Yerevan Ararat Brandy Factory
- Yerevan Brandy Company

== Culture ==
- Yerevan International Film Festival
- Yerevan Komitas State Conservatory
- Yerevan Opera Theatre
- Yerevan State Musical Comedy Theatre

== Sports ==
- BKMA Yerevan, an Armenian football club from Yerevan
- Erebuni SC, a former Armenian football club from Yerevan
- Erebuni-Homenmen Yerevan, originally Homenmen-FIMA Yerevan, Armenian football club from Yerevan
- FC Arabkir Yerevan, a former Armenian football club from Yerevan
- FC Dinamo Yerevan, a former Armenian football club from Yerevan
- FC Spartak Yerevan, a former Armenian football club from Yerevan
- FC Van Yerevan, an Armenian football club from Yerevan
- FC Yerazank Yerevan, an Armenian football club from Yerevan
- FC Yerevan, an Armenian football club based in Yerevan
- Malatia Yerevan, a former Armenian football club from Yerevan
- RUOR Yerevan, an Armenian football club from Yerevan
- SC Nairi Yerevan, a former Armenian football club from Yerevan
- SKIF Yerevan, an Armenian football club from Yerevan
- Yerevan United FC, an Armenian football from Yerevan

== Universities and institutes ==
- Yerevan Computer Research and Development Institute
- Yerevan Physics Institute
- Yerevan State Linguistic University
- Yerevan State Medical University
- Yerevan State University
- Yerevan State University of Architecture and Construction

== Other uses ==
- Yerevan dialect
- Yerevan-Avia, a privately owned airline operating international cargo flights from Yerevan
- Asia/Yerevan, a time zone identifier from zone file of the IANA time zone database
