= Rafael Nazaryan =

Armenian footballer and manager

Personal information
- Full name: Rafael Hovhannesi Nazaryan
- Date of birth: 26 March 1975 (age 51)
- Place of birth: Yerevan, Soviet Union
- Height: 1.81 m (5 ft 11 1/2 in)
- Position: Defensive midfielder

Senior career*
Years	Team	Apps	(Gls)
1993–1997	Ararat Yerevan	78	(8)
1998	Erebuni Yerevan	11	(2)
1998	Constructorul Chişinău	5	(0)
1999–2000	Araks Ararat	26	(6)
2000	Zvartnots Yerevan	12	(0)
2001	Pyunik Yerevan	18	(1)
2001	Mika Ashtarak	0	(0)
2002	Banants Yerevan	10	(0)
2003–2004	Pyunik Yerevan	30	(5)
2004	Darida Minsk Raion	8	(1)
2005–2007	Pyunik Yerevan	57	(10)
2006	→ Kilikia Yerevan (loan)	0	(0)
2008	Ulisses Yerevan	15	(2)

International career^{‡}
1997–2007	Armenia	23	(1)

Managerial career
- 2011–2013: Armenia U-21
- 2011–2013: Banants
- 2013: Pyunik
- 2018–2019: Artsakh
- 2019–2023: BKMA Yerevan
- 2023–2024: Ararat Yerevan
- 2024–2025: Shirak
- * Club domestic league appearances and goals as of 30 November 2008 ‡ National team caps and goals as of 27 November 2007

Rafael Nazaryan (Armenian: Ռաֆայել Նազարյան, born on 26 March 1975 in Yerevan, Soviet Union) is a retired Armenian football midfielder and a current manager. He was a member of the Armenia national team and participated in 23 international matches, scoring 1 goal in an away 1998 World Cup qualification match against Portugal on 20 August 1997. In February 2011 Rafael was appointed as a head coach of the Armenia national youth football team.

== Honours ==
=== As Player ===
Armenian Premier League: 1993, 2006, 2007

Armenian Cup: 1993, 1994, 1995, 1996–97, 2002, 2004

=== As Manager ===
Armenian Cup: 2012–13
