= Erebuni =

Erebuni may refer to:

- Erebuni Fortress, the fortress of ancient kingdom of Urartu, now territory of Armenia
- Yerevan, capital of Armenia originated from the Erebuni Fortress
- Erebuni SC, an association football club based in Yerevan
- Erebuni-Homenmen FC, defunct association football club based in Yerevan between 1992 and 2000
- Erebuni District, an administrative district of Yerevan
- Erebuni Museum, history and archeological museum near the Erebuni Fortress of Yerevan
- Erebuni Airport, a joint civil and military airport in Yerevan
