= Mkrtich Hovhannisyan =

Armenian footballer

Mrktich Hovhannisyan
Personal information
- Date of birth: 4 January 1970 (age 56)
- Height: 1.75 m (5 ft 9 in)
- Position: Midfielder

Senior career*
Years	Team	Apps	(Gls)
–1993	Kanaz Yerevan	44 (+?)	(28 (+?))
1994–1997	Kotayk Abovyan	80	(33)
1998	Erebuni Yerevan	6	(0)
1998–2000	Zvartnots-AAL	63	(8)
2000	Lernagorts Kapan	10	(2)
2001	Banants Yerevan	19	(11)
2002	Lernagorts Kapan	18	(6)

International career
1992	Armenia	1	(0)
- * Club domestic league appearances and goals

Mrktich Hovhannisyan (Armenian: Մկրտիչ Հովհաննիսյան; born 4 January 1970) is a retired Armenian football midfielder.
