= 1995–96 Armenian Premier League =

Football league season

Statistics of Armenian Premier League in the 1995/96 season.

- Homenetmen Yerevan changed their name to FC Pyunik due to changes in the club ownership and sponsorship.
- Yerazank FC disbanded and yielded their place to Karabakh. Karabakh, a Nagorno-Karabakh Republic-based club from Stepanakert, were relocated to Yerevan.
- Kotayk Abovyan and Banants Kotayk were merged and the name of the merger was limited to FC Kotayk.
- Newly-established FC Yerevan was promoted to replace Banants Kotayk.

== League table ==
Pos	Team	Pld	W	D	L	GF	GA	GD	Pts	Qualification or relegation
1	Pyunik (C)	22	19	3	0	71	14	+57	60	Qualification for the UEFA Cup preliminary round
2	Shirak	22	16	3	3	67	23	+44	51	Qualification for the UEFA Cup preliminary round
3	Yerevan	22	13	5	4	43	24	+19	44	
4	Ararat Yerevan	22	12	3	7	58	28	+30	39	
5	Tsement Ararat	22	12	3	7	57	33	+24	39	
6	Kotayk	22	11	3	8	31	33	−2	36	Qualification for the Cup Winners' Cup qualifying round
7	Karabakh Yerevan	22	8	5	9	29	28	+1	29	
8	Van Yerevan	22	7	3	12	42	42	0	24	
9	Homenmen Yerevan	22	6	3	13	30	52	−22	21	
10	Zangezour	22	5	2	15	26	60	−34	17	
11	Aragats (R)	22	4	3	15	35	89	−54	15	Qualification for the Relegation play-off
12	Aznavour (R)	22	0	2	20	19	82	−63	2	Relegation to First League

Source: RSSSF
(C) Champions; (R) Relegated

== Results ==
Home \ Away	ARG	ARA	AZN	HOM	KAR	KOT	PYU	SHI	TSE	VAN	YER	ZAN
Aragats		1–5	4–3	4–2	2–1	0–2	2–3	4–7	1–4	3–0	1–3	2–2
Ararat Yerevan	3–2		8–0	3–1	1–1	2–1	1–3	1–1	1–3	3–1	1–3	8–0
Aznavour	1–1	1–3		3–4	0–1	1–2	2–4	0–3	2–4	0–4	0–2	1–2
Homenmen-FIMA	3–1	1–3	3–1		0–0	0–1	1–6	0–1	3–2	4–2	1–1	1–2
Karabakh Yerevan	6–0	2–1	2–1	0–0		0–1	0–3	1–0	0–0	1–0	1–2	3–4
Kotayk	6–0	0–4	1–1	4–2	1–0		0–1	1–7	3–1	0–0	1–1	2–0
Pyunik	6–0	0–0	5–0	4–0	4–0	5–3		4–0	2–1	2–1	1–0	5–0
Shirak	6–2	2–1	10–0	5–0	1–0	2–0	0–1		3–1	2–2	3–1	4–0
Tsement Ararat	6–1	2–1	5–0	4–1	3–5	3–0	0–0	2–4		3–0	3–0	4–0
Van Yerevan	11–1	0–5	6–0	4–1	2–1	0–1	1–4	1–4	1–1		1–3	2–0
Yerevan	6–0	2–1	5–1	0–2	1–1	3–0	2–2	1–1	1–0	2–1		1–0
Zangezour	3–3	1–2	3–1	1–0	1–3	0–1	0–6	0–1	4–5	1–2	2–3	

Source: RSSSF
Legend: Blue = home team win; Yellow = draw; Red = away team win.

== Promotion/relegation play-off ==
Date	Venue	PL Team	Result	FL Team
8 June	Yerevan	Aragats	0 - 4	BKMA Yerevan

== Top goalscorers ==
#	Player		Team	Goals
1	(Armenia)	Arayik Adamyan	Shirak	28
2	(Armenia)	Hovhannes Toumbaryan	Tsement Ararat	24
3	(Armenia)	Tigran Yesayan	Yerevan	20
4	(Armenia)	Arthur Petrosyan	Shirak	13
4	(Armenia)	Arthur Manukyan	Zangezour	13

Source: RSSSF

== See also ==
- 1995–96 in Armenian football
- 1995–96 Armenian First League
- 1996 Armenian Cup
