= 2006 Armenian Premier League =

Armenian Premier League
- Season: 2006
- Dates: 14 April – 9 November 2004
- Champions: Pyunik
- Champions League: Pyunik
- UEFA Cup: Banants; Mika
- UEFA Intertoto Cup: Ararat Yerevan
- Matches played: 112
- Goals scored: 364 (3.25 per match)
- Top goalscorer: Aram Hakobyan (25)
- Biggest home win: Pyunik 12-1 Kilikia (21 October 2006)
- Biggest away win: Ulisses 0-7 Banants (9 November 2006)
- Highest scoring: Pyunik 12-1 Kilikia (21 October 2006)
- All statistics correct as of 21 March 2023.

The 2006 Armenian Premier League season was the fifteenth since its establishment, and started on 14 April 2006. The last matches were played on 9 November 2006. FC Pyunik were the defending champions.

== Participating teams ==
Location of teams in the 2006 Armenian Premier League
- Ararat Yerevan and Gandzasar are promoted.
- FC Lernagorts Kapan withdrew from the competition.
- Esteghlal-Kotayk are renamed back to FC Kotayk.
- Dinamo-Zenit are renamed Ulisses FC.

Club	City	Stadium	Capacity
Ararat Yerevan	Yerevan	Hrazdan Stadium	55,000
Banants	Yerevan	Nairi Stadium	6,850
Kotayk	Abovyan	Kotayk Stadium	5,500
Gandzasar	Kapan	Lernagorts Stadium	3,500
Kilikia	Yerevan	Hrazdan Stadium	55,000
Mika Ashtarak	Ashtarak	Kasakhi Marzik Stadium	3,500
Pyunik	Yerevan	Republican Stadium	14,968
Shirak	Gyumri	Gyumri City Stadium	2,844
Ulisses	Yerevan	Republican Stadium	14,968

== League table ==
Pos	Team	Pld	W	D	L	GF	GA	GD	Pts	Qualification
1	Pyunik (C)	28	23	4	1	86	23	+63	73	Qualification for the Champions League first qualifying round
2	Banants	28	18	3	7	67	26	+41	57	Qualification for the UEFA Cup first qualifying round
3	Mika	28	17	6	5	45	21	+24	57	Qualification for the UEFA Cup first qualifying round
4	Ararat Yerevan	28	15	4	9	48	35	+13	49	Qualification for the Intertoto Cup first round
5	Gandzasar	28	7	3	18	28	60	−32	24	
6	Kilikia	28	6	5	17	38	69	−31	23	
7	Shirak	28	4	7	17	21	64	−43	19	
8	Ulisses (O)	28	5	2	21	31	66	−35	17	Qualification for the Relegation play-off
9	Kotayk (W)	0	0	0	0	0	0	0	0	Club dissolved (Note: Kotayk were disbanded before start of the season.)

Rules for classification: 1) points; 2) goal difference; 3) number of goals scored.
(C) Champions; (O) Play-off winners; (W) Withdrew

== Results ==
=== First half of season ===
Home \ Away	ARA	BAN	GAN	KIL	MIK	PYU	SHI	ULI
Ararat Yerevan		1–0	3–1	3–2	0–2	0–5	1–1	1–0
Banants	2–1		0–0	1–0	2–1	2–4	6–0	2–0
Gandzasar	2–1	1–7		4–2	0–1	0–1	2–2	1–0
Kilikia	1–1	1–5	3–0		1–2	2–2	1–0	1–2
Mika	2–0	1–0	3–0	2–0		0–3	4–0	1–1
Pyunik	1–0	3–0	3–0	4–2	3–1		7–0	2–1
Shirak	1–1	0–5	2–1	1–1	0–0	1–2		0–1
Ulisses	2–3	0–4	1–2	1–2	2–3	1–3	1–2	

Legend: Blue = home team win; Yellow = draw; Red = away team win.

=== Second half of season ===
Home \ Away	ARA	BAN	GAN	KIL	MIK	PYU	SHI	ULI
Ararat Yerevan		3–0	1–0	1–0	0–1	1–1	6–2	2–0
Banants	3–1		4–1	2–1	1–0	1–2	3–0	0–0
Gandzasar	1–3	1–5		2–0	0–2	0–1	1–0	2–3
Kilikia	0–6	1–1	2–2		0–3	0–3	4–0	6–2
Mika	2–3	1–0	2–0	4–1		0–0	1–1	3–2
Pyunik	2–0	1–2	5–1	12–1	1–1		3–1	4–1
Shirak	1–4	1–2	2–1	1–0	0–0	1–2		1–3
Ulisses	0–1	0–7	1–2	2–3	0–2	3–6	1–0	

Legend: Blue = home team win; Yellow = draw; Red = away team win.

== Relegation/Promotion play-off ==
Date	Venue	PL Club	Result	FL Club	Information
18 November	unknown	Ulisses	4-2	Dinamo Yerevan	Ulisses remains in the Premier League

== Season statistics ==
=== Top scorers ===
As of match played 9 November 2006

Rank	Player	Club	Goals
1	(Armenia) Aram Hakobyan	Banants	25
2	(Armenia) Nshan Erzrumyan	Kilikia/Ararat Yerevan	22
3	(Armenia) Artur Kocharyan	Gandzasar Kapan	15
4	(Armenia) Armen Shahgeldyan	Mika	14
5	(Armenia) Arsen Avetisyan	Pyunik	12
5	(Armenia) Sargis Movsisyan	Kilikia	12
7	(Armenia) Alexander Petrosyan	Pyunik	10
8	(Armenia) Gor Atabekyan	Gandzasar Kapan	9
8	(Armenia) Levon Pachajyan	Pyunik	9
10	(Armenia) Edgar Safaryan	Ararat Yerevan	8
10	(Armenia) Samvel Melkonyan	Banants	8

== See also ==
- 2006 Armenian First League
- 2006 Armenian Cup
