= Vardan Ghazaryan =

Association football player and manager (born 1969)

Personal information
- Full name: Vardan Martun Ghazaryan
- Date of birth: 1 December 1969 (age 56)
- Place of birth: Kapan, Armenian SSR, Soviet Union
- Height: 1.81 m (5 ft 11 in)
- Position: Striker

Senior career*
Years	Team	Apps	(Gls)
1989	Spartak Hoktemberyan	19	(4)
1990–1992	Syunik Kapan (Note: Kapan changed its name to Syunik Kapan in 1991.)	76	(75)
1992–1999	Homenetmen Beirut		(82)
1999–2002	Sagesse		(29)
2002–2005	Homenetmen Beirut		(5+)
2005–2009	Sagesse		(13+)
Total			(208+)

International career
1995–2001	Lebanon	66	(21)

Managerial career
- 2017: Tripoli
- 2021–2022: Sagesse
- * Club domestic league appearances and goals

Vardan Martun Ghazaryan (Note: Armenian: Վարդան Մարտուն Ղազարյան Arabic: وارطان مارتون غازاريان) (born 1 December 1969) is a football coach and former player. Born in Armenia, he played for the Lebanon national team.

Ghazaryan started his career in Armenia in 1989, playing for Spartak Hoktemberyan and Syunik Kapan. He moved to Lebanon in 1992, playing for Homenetmen Beirut and Sagesse, and represented Lebanon internationally from 1995 until 2001. Ghazaryan is the second-highest scorer in the Lebanese Premier League, with 129 goals, and the second-highest scorer for the national team, with 21 goals, having been surpassed by Hassan Maatouk in both instances.

Ghazaryan was appointed manager of Tripoli in 2017 for one year. He returned to Sagesse as head coach in 2021.

== Club career ==
Ghazaryan started his senior career in 1989 in Armenia, at Spartak Hoktemberyan, before moving to Kapan in 1990. In 1992 he moved to Lebanon, joining Homenetmen Beirut. He stayed there for seven years, before moving to Sagesse in 1999. He spent three years there, before moving back to Homenetmen in 2002. Ghazaryan then joined Sagesse once again, in 2005, before retiring in 2009 aged 39.

His first goal in the Lebanese Premier League came on 23 January 1993, when he scored the second goal for Homenetmen against Tadamon Sour in the 54th minute. Ghazaryan was named AFC Player of the Month for January 1996.

On 16 November 2008, at 39 years old, Ghazaryan scored his 129th goal in the Lebanese Premier League against Tadamon Sour, becoming the all-time scorer in the league. His record was surpassed by Hassan Maatouk in 2026.

== International career ==
Having moved to Lebanon from Armenia, Ghazaryan obtained Lebanese citizenship through naturalisation in 1994. He was the top goalscorer in the history of the Lebanon national team, with 21 goals (four in World Cup qualifiers, three in Asian Cup qualifiers and 14 in friendlies). In 2023, Ghazaryan was surpassed by Hassan Maatouk.

== Managerial career ==
In 2009, Ghazaryan returned to his native Armenia where he trained an Armenian club; he moved back to Lebanon four years later. Ghazaryan became the assistant coach for Tripoli, before being appointed head coach in 2017.

In July 2021, ahead of the 2021 Lebanese Challenge Cup, Ghazaryan was appointed head coach of Lebanese Premier League side Sagesse, for whom he had already played as a player.

== Career statistics ==
=== International ===
Appearances and goals by national team and year
National team	Year	Apps	Goals
Lebanon	1995	1	0
Lebanon	1996	14	11
Lebanon	1997	15	3
Lebanon	1998	15	1
Lebanon	1999	6	1
Lebanon	2000	9	1
Lebanon	2001	6	4
Total		66	21

Scores and results list Lebanon's goal tally first, score column indicates score after each Ghazaryan goal.

List of international goals scored by Vardan Ghazaryan
No.	Date	Venue	Opponent	Score	Result	Competition
1	16 January 1996	Camille Chamoun Sports City Stadium, Beirut, Lebanon	Cyprus	1–0	1–0	Friendly
2	11 February 1996	Bourj Hammoud Stadium, Beirut, Lebanon	Ecuador	1–0	1–0	Friendly
3	26 May 1996	Köpetdag Stadium, Ashgabat, Turkmenistan	Turkmenistan	1–0	1–0	1996 AFC Asian Cup qualification
4	9 June 1996	Camille Chamoun Sports City Stadium, Beirut, Lebanon	Kuwait	2–0	3–5	1996 AFC Asian Cup qualification
5	9 June 1996	Camille Chamoun Sports City Stadium, Beirut, Lebanon	Kuwait	3–3	3–5	1996 AFC Asian Cup qualification
6	5 September 1996	Camille Chamoun Sports City Stadium, Beirut, Lebanon	Oman	1–0	1–2	Friendly
7	8 September 1996	Beirut Municipal Stadium, Beirut, Lebanon	Oman	1–1	2–1	Friendly
8	8 September 1996	Beirut Municipal Stadium, Beirut, Lebanon	Oman	2–1	2–1	Friendly
9	9 October 1996	Camille Chamoun Sports City Stadium, Beirut, Lebanon	New Zealand	1–0	1–1	Friendly
10	5 December 1996	Beirut Municipal Stadium, Beirut, Lebanon	Georgia	1–2	4–2	Friendly
11	8 December 1996	Beirut Municipal Stadium, Beirut, Lebanon	Georgia	3–2	3–2	Friendly
12	12 January 1997	Camille Chamoun Sports City Stadium, Beirut, Lebanon	Algeria	1–1	2–2	Friendly
13	19 March 1997	Zayed Sports City Stadium, Abu Dhabi, United Arab Emirates	United Arab Emirates	1–2	1–2	Friendly
14	27 April 1997	Camille Chamoun Sports City Stadium, Beirut, Lebanon	Libya	2–0	2–0	Friendly
15	17 October 1998	Zayed Sports City Stadium, Abu Dhabi, United Arab Emirates	Syria	1–0	3–3	1998 Friendship Tournament
16	16 August 1999	Amman International Stadium, Amman, Jordan	Saudi Arabia	1–0	1–2	1999 Pan Arab Games
17	23 February 2000	International Olympic Stadium, Tripoli, Lebanon	Jordan	1–0	1–1	Friendly
18	26 May 2001	Rajamangala Stadium, Bangkok, Thailand	Pakistan	2–0	8–1	2002 FIFA World Cup qualification
19	26 May 2001	Rajamangala Stadium, Bangkok, Thailand	Pakistan	6–1	8–1	2002 FIFA World Cup qualification
20	28 May 2001	Rajamangala Stadium, Bangkok, Thailand	Sri Lanka	1–0	5–0	2002 FIFA World Cup qualification
21	30 May 2001	Rajamangala Stadium, Bangkok, Thailand	Thailand	1–0	2–2	2002 FIFA World Cup qualification

== Honours ==
=== Player ===
Syunik Kapan

- Armenian SSR League: 1991

Homenetmen

- Lebanese Second Division: 2002–03

Individual

- IFFHS All-time Lebanon Men's Dream Team
- AFC Player of the Month: January 1996
- Lebanese Premier League Best Player: 1996–97
- Lebanese Premier League Team of the Season: 1996–97, 1999–2000

== See also ==
- List of Lebanon international footballers
- List of Lebanon international footballers born outside Lebanon
