= Dilijan City Stadium =

Football stadium

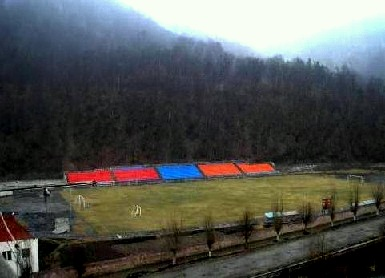
- Interactive map of Dilijan City Stadium
- Full name: Dilijan City Stadium
- Location: 19 Tsaturyan street Dilijan, Armenia
- Owner: Impulse FC
- Capacity: 2,200
- Surface: grass

Construction
- Renovated: 2011

Tenant
- Impuls (2009-2011)

Dilijan City Stadium (Armenian: Դիլիջանի Քաղաքային Մարզադաշտ) is an all-seater football stadium in Dilijan, Tavush Province, Armenia. It is the only stadium in the town and used to be the home ground of Impulse FC of the Armenian Premier League. The capacity of the stadium is 2,200 seats.

== Overview ==
After the promotion of Impulse FC to the top division of Armenian football league in 2009, the stadium was partly renovated to meet the UEFA standards. Later in 2011, the stadium was entirely renovated.

After the dissolution of Impulse FC in 2013, the Dilijan City Stadium became a regular training venue for the local youth clubs of Tavush Province.
