= Tigran Yesayan =

Armenian footballer (born 1972)

Personal information
- Full name: Tigran Rubeni Yesayan
- Date of birth: 2 June 1972 (age 54)
- Place of birth: Yerevan, Armenian SSR, Soviet Union (now Armenia)
- Height: 1.65 m (5 ft 5 in)
- Position: Striker

Senior career*
Years	Team	Apps	(Gls)
1990	Kotayk Abovyan	0	(0)
1990–1992	Zoravan Yegvard	27	(17)
1993	Zvartnots Vagharshapat	75	(15)
1994	Dinamo Yerevan		(30)
1995–1998	FC Yerevan	89	(56)
1999	Torpedo Zaporizhia	11	(2)
2000	Ararat Yerevan	26	(17)
2001	Salam Zgharta		
2001	Ararat Yerevan	6	(5)
2002	Ararat Issy		
2002	Banants Yerevan	18	(11)
2003	Homenmen Beirut		
2004	Banants Yerevan	9	(4)
2004–2005	Ararat Yerevan		
2005	Lernayin Artsakh	9	(2)
2006	Ararat Yerevan	5	(0)

International career
1996–1999	Armenia	21	(4)

Managerial career
- 2010: Ararat Yerevan
- 2012–2014: Ararat Yerevan B
- 2014–2016: Gandzasar Kapan B
- 2016–2017: Kotayk
- 2017–2018: Artsakh
- 2019: Ararat Yerevan
- * Club domestic league appearances and goals

Tigran Yesayan (Armenian: Տիգրան Եսայան, born 2 June 1972) is an Armenian football former player and coach. He played striker for the Armenia national team and for several Armenian Premier League clubs.

== Club career ==
Tigran Yesayan began playing football in 1990 for Zoravana, which competed in the second minor league Soviet First League. Since 1992, Zoravana moved directly to the Armenian Premier League, in which the club finished bottom of the league and had its place relegated to the Armenian First League. However, after the season, Yesayan moved to Zvartnots Echmiadzin. After the end of the season, Yesayan again moved to Dinamo Yerevan, which played in the Armenian Premier League. Yesayan was among the top goalscorers for the team and scored 30 goals for Dinamo. This score was the best in the Armenian Premier League for the 1994 season. In 1995, Yesayan transferred to FC Yerevan. While he was playing for Yerevan, the club won the 1997 Armenian Premier League and became the 1998 Armenian Cup finalist. Yesayan later moved to Torpedo Zaporizhia and played there for the 1999–2000 season. Part way through the season, he transferred to Ararat Yerevan, which became the finalist in the 2000 Armenian Premier League. With 17 goals, Yesayan was the second top goalscorer. He then played for the Lebanese-Armenian club Homenmen Beirut from 2000 to 2002. Yesayan then moved back to Armenia and joined Banants Yerevan. With the club, they became Armenian Premier League finalists twice in 2002 and 2004 and Armenian Cup finalists twice in 2003 and 2004. He rejoined Ararat Yerevan in 2004. In 2005, he played for Artsakh Republic club Lernayin Artsakh. Yesayan joined Ararat Yerevan for a third time in 2005 and retired from football on the club in 2006.

== International career ==
Yesayan had participated in 21 international matches and scored four goals for the Armenia national football team since his debut in an away friendly match against Peru on 20 February 1996. He left the national squad in 1999. (add second) Yesayan is the tenth top goalscorer for the Armenian national squad of all time.

== Managerial career ==
After a career of playing football, Yesayan started coaching. He mostly coached youth and junior teams at first. In late January 2010, he became the head coach of Ararat Yerevan, which he played his last season for. The club had since been relegated to the Armenian First League. Under the leadership of Yesayan, the club won the 2010 Armenian First League and returned to the Premier League. After the end of the season and expiry of his contract, Yesayan signed a new contract with the Ararat for a period of one year. On 16 February, Yesayan had resigned from his post as head coach. The reason was the approach of the preparatory process of the team during the fall and spring transfer window and lack of serious recruitment of players who would seriously strengthened the team in games against Premier League clubs. In general, because of these factors, as well as other minor disclosed information, Yesayan left the club.

He later became the head coach of Banants-2 for 2011. After dismissed from his post as head coach of Banants-2 that same year, Ashot Barseghyan filled the vacant position in the club. At the end of the season left office.

At the end of February 2012, Yesayan returned to the coaching staff of Ararat, only this time as the coach of Ararat-2.

== Career statistics ==
#	Date	Venue	Opponent	Score	Result	Competition
1	25 June 1996	Paraguay	Paraguay	2-1	Win	Friendly
2	5 September 1998	Armenia	Andorra	3-1	Win	2000 ECQ
3	5 September 1998	Armenia	Andorra	3-1	Win	2000 ECQ
4	9 October 1999	Andorra	Andorra	3-0	Win	2000 ECQ

== Honours ==
=== As a player ===
FC Yerevan

- Armenian Premier League: 1997; third place: 1995–96, 1996–97, 1998
- Armenian Cup runner-up: 1998

Ararat Yerevan

- Armenian Premier League runner-up: 2000

Banants Yerevan

- Armenian Premier League runner-up: 2002, 2004
- Armenian Cup runner-up: 2003, 2004

=== As a manager ===
Ararat Yerevan

- Armenian First League: 2010

=== Individual ===
- Most matches played for FC Yerevan: 95 matches
- Most goals scored for FC Yerevan: 61 goals
