= FC Akhtala =

Akhtala
- Full name: Football Club Akhtala
- Founded: 1988; 37 years ago
- Dissolved: 1992; 33 years ago
- Ground: Akhtala City Stadium; Akhtala
- Capacity: 200

FC Akhtala (Armenian: Ֆուտբոլային Ակումբ Ախթալա), is a defunct Armenian football club from Akhtala, Lori Province. The club was formed in 1988 and participated in the Armenian First League season in 1992. However, the club was dissolved by the end of the 1992.

== League record ==
Year	Club Name	Division	Position	GP	W	D	L	GS	GA	PTS
1992 (first stage)	Akhtala	Armenian First League	10	18	1	3	14	18	68	5
1992 (relegation stage)	Akhtala	Armenian First League	19	26	6	3	17	41	72	15
