= Arsen Avetisyan =

Armenian footballer

Personal information
- Full name: Arsen Avetisyan
- Date of birth: 8 October 1973 (age 53)
- Place of birth: Yerevan, Armenian SSR, Soviet Union
- Height: 1.69 m (5 ft 7 in)
- Position: Striker

Senior career*
Years	Team	Apps	(Gls)
1990–1991	Malatia Yerevan	54	(22)
1992–1997	Homenetmen Yerevan	149	(128)
1997–1998	Berchem Sport		
1998	Pyunik Yerevan	12	(5)
1999–2000	Ararat Yerevan	29	(12)
2000	Zvartonots-AAL	10	(5)
2000–2003	Zhemchuzhina-Sochi	45	(26)
2003	Zhemchuzhina Budyonnovsk	30	(5)
2004–2005	Mashuk Pyatigorsk	50	(22)
2006–2008	Pyunik Yerevan	47	(21)
2008–2011	Gandzasar Kapan	82	(26)
Total		508	(272)

International career
1992–1998	Armenia	25	(1)
- * Club domestic league appearances and goals as of 24 November 2010

Arsen Avetisyan (Armenian: Արսեն Ավետիսյան, born 8 October 1973) is a retired Armenian footballer who played as a forward.

== Club career ==
Avetisyan has played for numerous clubs during his career. In 2006, he returned to Armenia to play for his former club Pyunik and became the main forward for the team. In 2008, he transferred to Kapan to play for Gandzasar after his contract with Pyunik had expired.

== International career ==
Avetisyan made his debut for Armenia national football team in 1992, gaining 25 caps and scoring one goal. He announced his retirement from international football in 1998.

== Honours ==
- Armenian Premier League: 5

1992, 1995–96, 1996–97, 2006, 2007

- Armenian Independence Cup: 1

1996
