= FC Sipan =

Armenian football club

FC Sipan (Armenian: Ֆոտբոլային Ակումբ Սիփան) was an Armenian football club from the Spandaryan village of Shirak Province. It was dissolved in 1993 and is currently inactive from professional football. The club played its home games at the village's football ground named after Hamlet Mkhitaryan.
