= FC Shinarar =

Shinarar
- Full name: Football Club Shinarar
- Dissolved: 1992; 34 years ago
- Ground: Hrazdan City Stadium, Hrazdan
- Capacity: 2,300

FC Shinarar (Armenian: Շինարար Ֆուտբոլային Ակումբ), also known as Dvin Hrazdan, was an Armenian football club from Hrazdan, Kotayk Province. The club was dissolved after the end of 1992 Armenian First League season (during which they got relegated to the Second League due to their performance) and is no longer active in professional football.
