= FC Geghard =

Geghard
- Full name: Football Club Geghard
- Dissolved: 1993; 32 years ago
- Ground: Kotayk Stadium; Abovyan
- Capacity: 3,946

FC Geghard (Armenian: Ֆուտբոլային Ակումբ Գեղարդ), is a defunct Armenian football club from Abovyan, Kotayk Province. The club participated in the initial Armenian First League season in 1992. However, the club was dissolved prior to the kick-off of the 1993 season of the First League.

== League record ==
Year	Club Name	Division	Position	GP	W	D	L	GS	GA	PTS
1992 (first stage)	Geghard	Armenian First League	1	18	15	0	3	54	19	30
1992 (promotion stage)	Geghard	Armenian First League	6	10	0	0	10	6	29	0
