= Urmia Masis FC =

Armenian football club

Urmia Masis FC (Armenian: Ուրմիա Մասիս Ֆուտբոլային Ակումբ) was an Armenian football club from Masis, Ararat Province. The club dissolved in early 1994 due to financial difficulties.

== League record ==
Year	Club Name	Division	Position	GP	W	D	L	GS	GA	PTS
1992	Urmia Masis FC	Armenian First League	13	26	10	6	10	41	33	26
1993	Masis FC	Armenian First League	7	22	7	5	10	27	51	19
1994–present	-	no participation	-	-	-	-	-	-	-	-
