= FC Moush Charentsavan =

Association football club from Charentsavan, Armenia

FC Moush Charentsavan (Armenian: Ֆուտբոլային Ակումբ Մուշ Չարենցավան) was an Armenian football club from Charentsavan, Kotayk Province. They played their home games at the Charentsavan City Stadium which has a capacity of 5,000 spectators.

The club was dissolved in 1994 and is currently inactive from professional football.

== League Record ==
Year	Club Name	Division	Position	GP	W	D	L	GS	GA	PTS
1990	Moush	Armenian SSR League	14	30	12	4	14	64	67	28
1991	Moush	Armenian SSR League	16	38	10	9	19	47	76	29
1992	Moush	Armenian First League	10	26	14	3	9	60	40	31
1993	Moush	Armenian First League	9	XX	XX	XX	XX	XX	XX	XX
1994–present	-	no participation	-	-	-	-	-	-	-	-
