= FC Nig Aparan =

Armenian football club

FC Nig Aparan Armenian: Ֆուտբոլային Ակումբ Նիգ Ապարան) is a defunct Armenian football club from Aparan, Aragatsotn Province. The club was dissolved in 1999 and is inactive from professional football.
