= Impuls FC =

- Full name: Impuls Football Club
- Founded: 1985
- Dissolved: 2013
- Ground: Dilijan City Stadium, Dilijan
- Capacity: 2,200
- Last owner: Hakob Hakobyan
- Last chairman: Tigran Hakobyan
- Last coach: Armen Gyulbudaghyants
- Final season 2012–13: Armenian Premier League, 5th
Home colours	Away colours

Impuls Football Club (Armenian: Իմպուլս Ֆուտբոլային Ակումբ), is a defunct Armenian professional football club from the town of Dilijan, Tavush Province. The club used to play in the Armenian Premier League, the top division of the Armenian football. The home ground of Impuls was the Dilijan City Stadium.

== History ==
Impulse FC was originally founded in 1985 during the Soviet days. In 1994, the club was dissolved due to financial difficulties.

In 2009, Impuls FC was revived by the efforts of former member of Armenian Parliament Hakob Hakobyan, as part of the Sport Club Erebuni Dilijan. Based in the town of Dilijan, The home ground of the club was the Dilijan City Stadium. However Impuls played but their latest season at the Armenian football league at the Ayg Stadium of Ararat.

However, the club was dissolved in May 2013, by the decision of the owners.

== League record ==
Season	League									National Cup	Top goalscorer		Manager
Season	Div.	Pos.	Pl.	W	D	L	GS	GA	P	National Cup	Name	League	Manager
1990	Soviet Lower Second League	15	18	9	3	6	36	30	21				(Armenia) Hrachik Khachmanukyan
1991	Soviet Lower Second League	12	38	12	7	19	60	81	31				(Armenia) Vladimir Hovakimyan
1992	Armenian Premier League	15	22	13	4	5	54	33	30	Second round	(Armenia) Sergey Hayrbabamyan	28	(Armenia) Vladimir Hovakimyan
1993	Armenian Premier League	12	28	8	2	18	42	89	18	Second round	(Armenia) Sergey Hayrbabamyan	12	(Armenia) Vladimir Hovakimyan
1994–2008	no participation												
2009	Armenian First League	1	24	18	4	2	57	22	58	Quarter-final	(Armenia) Arman Minasyan	17	(Armenia) Stepan Baghdasaryan
2010	Armenian Premier League	5	28	10	7	11	29	43	37	Quarter-final	(Brazil) Elton Cardozo	6	(Armenia) Varuzhan Sukiasyan
2011	Armenian Premier League	6	28	10	7	11	37	36	37	Finalist	(Armenia) Zaven Badoyan	8	(Armenia) Armen Gyulbudaghyants
2012–13	Armenian Premier League	5	42	18	6	18	66	65	60	Quarter-final	(Armenia) Norayr Gyozalyan	21	(Armenia) Armen Gyulbudaghyants

== Managers ==
- (Armenian Soviet Socialist Republic) Hrachik Khachmanukyan (1982–1991)
- (Armenia) Vladimir Ovakimyan (1991–1993)
- (Armenia) Stepan Bagdasaryan (2009)
- (Armenia) Varuzhan Sukiasyan (2010)
- (Armenia) Armen Gyulbudaghyants (Jan 2011 – May 2013)
