= RUOR Yerevan =

Defunct Armenian football club

- Full name: Respublikansoye Uchilishe Olimpiyskogo Reserva
- Founded: 1989
- Dissolved: 1994
- League: Armenian First League
- 12 (1994)

RUOR Yerevan (Armenian: Երևանի Օլիմպիական Հերթափոխի Պետական Մարզական Քոլեջ) was an Armenian football club from the capital Yerevan, that represented the Republican School of Olympic Reserve (Respublikansoye Uchilishe Olimpiyskogo Reserva / Республиканское Училище Олимпийского Резерва).

The club was founded in 1989 during the Soviet period on the basis of the No. 10 High School of Sport orientation of Yerevan, established in 1971.

However, the club was dissolved in early 1994 and is currently inactive from professional football.

== League record ==
Year	Club Name	Division	Position	GP	W	D	L	GS	GA	PTS
1992	RUOR Yerevan	Armenian First League	15	26	9	7	10	45	49	25
1993	RUOR Yerevan	Armenian First League	12	XX	XX	XX	XX	XX	XX	XX
1994–present	-	no participation	-	-	-	-	-	-	-	-
