= FC Luys-Ararat =

Armenian football club

FC Luys-Ararat (Armenian: Ֆուտբոլային Ակումբ Լույս-Արարատ) was an Armenian football club from the capital Yerevan. The club was dissolved in 1994 and is currently inactive from professional football.
