= FC Almast =

Armenian football club

FC Almast (Armenian: Ֆուտբոլային Ակումբ Ալմաստ), is a defunct Armenian football club from the capital Yerevan. The club was dissolved in late 1993 due to financial difficulties and is currently inactive from professional football.

== League record ==
Year	Club Name	Division	Position	GP	W	D	L	GS	GA	PTS
1990	FC Almast Yerevan	Armenian SSR League	19	30	6	9	15	36	89	21
1991	FC Almast Yerevan	Armenian SSR League	20	38	7	3	28	36	103	17
1992	FC Almast Yerevan	Armenian First League	8	26	17	3	6	71	42	37
1993	FC Almast Yerevan	Armenian Second League	XX	XX	XX	XX	XX	XX	XX	XX
1994–present	-	no participation	-	-	-	-	-	-	-	-
