= Kilikia FC =

Kilikia
- Full name: Kilikia Football Club
- Founded: 1992; 34 years ago
- Ground: Hrazdan Stadium; Yerevan
- Capacity: 55,000
Home colours	Away colours	Third colours

Kilikia Football Club (Armenian: Կիլիկիա Ֆուտբոլային Ակումբ – Kilikia Futbolayin Akumb) is an Armenian football club from the capital Yerevan.

== History ==
=== Beginning ===
Kilikia F.C. was founded in 1992 and participated in the first ever independent Armenian championship. In 1992, they occupied the 12th spot in the table, and were allowed to play in the 1993 Armenian Premier League. At the beginning of 1993, the club merged with fellow financially struggling club FC Malatia. The merger lasted only for 1 year, as the team was relegated to the Armenian First League. In early 1994, the two clubs were separated and disbanded.

=== Revival in 1997 ===
Kilikia F.C. was revived in 1997, but did not participate in the league until 1999.

In 1999, Kilikia F.C. had replaced the financially struggling club Pyunik Yerevan in the Premier League. In 2001 Kilikia F.C. was relegated from the Armenian Premier League after refusing to pay the entrance fee. They got promoted again in 2003, and have since then finished sixth and fifth in the Premier League, with the fifth-place finish in 2005 earning them entry into the 2006 Intertoto Cup.

The club has since been struggling to keep up with the other clubs, as it only manages to field young local players.

=== Later years and dissolution ===
In 2011, the club management had to confirm the participation of Kilikia F.C. in the national championship of 2011 and make appropriate contributions to January 16. But no confirmation and payment is not made within the specified period. On January 26 the club sent an official letter in the Armenian Football Federation, saying that the team is disbanded and will not be able to participate in the championship of Armenia in 2011 because of financial problems. On January 31 FFA officially decided to exclude "Kilikia" from all football tournaments under the auspices of the FFA. Thus, the club ceased to exist.

=== Return ===
In 2021 the club returned to play in new Amateur A-League . Today Kilikia FC is led by David Yavryan.

== Achievements ==
- Armenian Cup
  - Runners-up (1) – 2005

== Kilikia F.C. in European cups ==
As of December, 2008.

Competition	Pld	W	D	L	GF	GA
UEFA Intertoto Cup	2	0	0	2	1	8

Season	Competition	Round	Club	1st leg	2nd leg
2006	UEFA Intertoto Cup	1R	(Georgia (country)) Dinamo Tbilisi	**1 – 5**	0–3

- Home results are noted in **bold**
