= FC Karin =

Armenian football club

FC Karin (Armenian: Ֆուտբոլային Ակումբ Կարին) is a defunct Armenian football club from the capital Yerevan. The club was dissolved in 1994 and is currently inactive from professional football.
