= FC Tufagorts =

Armenian football club

FC Tufagorts (Armenian: Ֆուտբոլային Ակումբ Տուֆագործ) was an Armenian football club from the town of Artik, Shirak Province.

The club was dissolved in 1995 and is currently inactive from professional football.

== League record ==
Year	Division	Position	GP	W	D	L	GS	GA	PTS
1992	Armenian First League	17	26	8	5	13	41	59	21
1993	Armenian First League	10	20	5	2	13	28	63	12
1994	Armenian First League	9	18	3	3	12	23	70	9
1995	Armenian First League	7	12	0	0	12	9	78	0
1996 – present	no participation								
