= Lernagorts Vardenis FC =

Armenian football club

Lernagorts Vardenis Football Club (Armenian: Լեռնագործ Վարդենիս Ֆուտբոլային Ակումբ) is a defunct football club from Vardenis, Gegharkunik Province, Armenia. The club was dissolved in 1995.

== League record ==
Year	Club Name	Division	Position	GP	W	D	L	GS	GA	PTS
1992	Lernagorts Vardenis	Armenian First League	11	26	12	4	10	51	45	28
1993	Lernagorts Vardenis	Armenian First League	6	22	9	1	12	42	45	19
1994	Sipan Vardenis	Armenian First League	10	18	3	1	14	20	54	7
1995	Lernagorts Vardenis	Armenian First League	4	14	7	2	5	20	27	23
1995–96 – present	-	no participation	-	-	-	-	-	-	-	-
