= FC Vanadzor =

Defunct Armenian football club

FC Vanadzor (Armenian: Ֆուտբոլային Ակումբ Վանաձոր) was an Armenian football club from the town of Vanadzor, Lori Province.

The club made its professional debut in the independent Armenian leagues in the 1992 Armenian First League. The club also went by the names Avtogen Vanadzor and Astgh Vanadzor.

== Stadium ==
Lori Stadium of Vanadzor was the home ground of FC Vanadzor. The stadium is able to host 5,000 spectators.
