= Araks Ararat FC =

Avshar Ararat FC
- Full name: Avshar Ararat Football Club
- Founded: 1960, as FC Ararat; 1993, as FC Tsement Ararat; 2000, as Araks Ararat FC; 2026, as FC Avshar Ararat
- Ground: Ayg Stadium, Ararat
- Capacity: 1,280
- Chairman: Abraham Babayan
- Manager: Varuzhan Sukiasyan
- League: Armenian First League
- 2025-26: 8th of 16

Avshar Ararat FC (Armenian: Ավշար Արարատ Ֆուտբոլային Ակումբ), formerly known as Araks Ararat FC (Armenian: Արաքս Արարատ Ֆուտբոլային Ակումբ), is Armenian football club from the town of Ararat, Ararat Province.

== Club history ==
The club was founded in 1960 as FC Ararat to represent the town of Ararat. With the independence of Armenia, the Ararat Cement Factory took over FC Ararat in 1993 and the club was renamed FC Tsement Ararat. They played in the Armenian Premier League and won two titles, the first in 1998 as Tsement and the 2nd in 2000 as Araks Ararat. The following year, Tsement yielded the championship to FC Shirak by two points and ended up on the third spot behind Ararat Yerevan. However, after many successful years, the club president Abraham Babayan was unable to finance the club. Eventually, the rights were sold in late 2000 to a new sponsor based in Yerevan and Araks Ararat FC was dissolved.

The club was resurrected a year later for the 2002 season, but since it gave its license for participating in the Premier League to Spartak Yerevan, was unable to participate in Premier League and had to settle to restart from the First League. From 2021 to 2025, the team played in the Amateur A-League, and in the 2024-25 had their reserve team played in the Amateur B-League. In 2025, after winning the 2024-25 A-League season, the senior team got licensed and returned to the Armenian First League. Ahead of the 2026–27 season, the team got renamed Avshar Ararat and introduced a new logo.

== Honours ==
- Armenian Premier League
  - Winners (2): 1998, 2000
- Armenian Cup
  - Winners (3): 1997, 1998, 1999
- Armenian Super Cup
  - Winners (1): 1998
- Amateur A-League
  - Winners (1): 2024–25

== Domestic history ==
Season	Name	League									Armenian Cup	Top goalscorer		Manager
Season	Name	Div.	Pos.	Pl.	W	D	L	GS	GA	P	Armenian Cup	Name	League	Manager
1992	Ararat	Armenian First League	1	10	9	0	1	37	12	18	First round			
1993	Tsement Ararat	Armenian Premier League	6	28	12	6	10	56	50	30	Quarter-final			
1994	Tsement Ararat	Armenian Premier League	6	28	11	6	11	54	49	28	First round			
1995	Tsement Ararat	Armenian Premier League	2	10	5	1	4	19	12	16	Semi-final			
1995–96	Tsement Ararat	Armenian Premier League	5	22	12	3	7	57	33	39	Quarter-final			
1996–97	Tsement Ararat	Armenian Premier League	5	22	13	3	6	49	26	42	Semi-final			
1997	Tsement Ararat	Armenian Premier League	5	18	8	3	7	28	27	27	Winner			
1998	Tsement Ararat	Armenian Premier League	1	26	20	4	2	70	22	64	Winner			
1999	Araks Ararat	Armenian Premier League	3	32	22	5	5	78	19	71	Winner			
2000	Araks Ararat	Armenian Premier League	1	28	19	4	5	65	33	61	Quarter-final			
2001	Araks Ararat	Club did not participate.												
2002	Araks Ararat	Armenian First League	2	30	25	2	3	85	18	77	Did not play			
2003	Araks Ararat	Armenian Premier League	8	28	2	3	23	17	86	9	First round			
2004	Araks Ararat	Armenian First League	6	30	16	3	11	57	31	51	Quarter-final			
2005–21	Araks Ararat	Club did not participate.												
2021–22	Araks Ararat	Amateur A-League	7	20	8	4	8	63	33	28	Did not play			
2022–23	Araks Ararat	Amateur A-League									Did not play			
2023–24	Araks Ararat	Amateur A-League									Did not play			
2024–25	Araks Ararat	Amateur A-League	1								First round			
2025-26	Araks Ararat	Armenian First League	1								Round of 16			

== Avshar Ararat in European competitions ==
As of June, 2010.

Competition	Pld	W	D	L	GF	GA
UEFA Champions League	2	0	0	2	0	5
UEFA Cup Winners' Cup	2	0	0	2	2	7
Total	4	0	0	4	2	12

Season	Competition	Round	Club	1st leg	2nd leg
1998–99	UEFA Cup Winners' Cup	QR	(Switzerland) Lausanne Sports	1–5	**1–2**
1999–2000	UEFA Champions League	1Q	(Lithuania) Zalgiris Vilnius	0–2	**0–3**

Notes:

- Home results are noted in **Bold**.
