= Hachn FC =

Defunct Armenian football club

Hachn FC (Armenian: Հաճն Ֆուտբոլային Ակումբ), is a defunct Armenian football club from Nor Hachn, Kotayk Province.

They played under the name Sapphire FC in the 1996–1997 Armenian First League season. The club was dissolved in 1997 and is currently inactive from professional football.
