= Kumayri FC =

Armenian football club

Kumayri FC (Armenian: Կումայրի Ֆուտբոլային Ակումբ) is a defunct Armenian football club from Gyumri, Shirak Province.

The club was dissolved in 1997 and is currently inactive from professional football.

== League record ==
Year	Club Name	Division	Position	GP	W	D	L	GS	GA	PTS
1992	Kumayri	Armenian First League	5	10	3	1	6	14	20	7
1993	Kumayri	Armenian First League	8	20	5	8	7	22	26	18
1994	Kumayri	Armenian First League	6	18	5	6	7	28	34	16
1995	Kumayri	Armenian First League	6	12	5	1	6	15	14	16
1995–96	Kumayri	Armenian First League	6	22	11	2	9	33	25	35
1996–97	Kumayri	Armenian First League	5	22	8	5	9	47	42	29
1997–present	-	no participation	-	-	-	-	-	-	-	-
