= Aragats Gyumri FC =

Aragats Gyumri
- Full name: Aragats Gyumri Football Club
- Founded: 1967; 58 years ago
- Dissolved: 2002; 23 years ago
- Ground: Gyumri City Stadium, Gyumri
- Capacity: 2,844

Aragats Gyumri FC (Armenian: Արագած Գյումրի Ֆուտբոլային Ակումբ), is a defunct Armenian football club from Gyumri, Shirak Province.

Aragats FC was founded in 1967 as the reserves club of FC Shirak. In 1973, the club was renamed Aragats Leninakan FC.

However, the club was dissolved in 2002 due to financial difficulties. Later, many former players of the club moved to Shirak-2 in 2007 to form the reserves team of FC Shirak.

== League record ==
Year	Club Name	Division	Position	GP	W	D	L	GS	GA	PTS
1992	Aragats	Armenian First League	2	10	8	0	2	15	5	16
1993	Aragats	Armenian First League	5	20	10	3	7	40	27	23
1994	Aragats	Armenian First League	1	18	15	1	2	69	19	31
1995	Aragats	Armenian Premier League	5	10	2	3	5	14	31	9
1995–96	Aragats	Armenian Premier League	11	22	4	3	15	35	89	15
1996–97	Aragats	no participation	-	-	-	-	-	-	-	-
1997	Shirak-2	Armenian First League	1	16	13	2	1	46	17	41
1998	Shirak-2	Armenian Premier League	9	20	0	1	19	10	68	1
1999	Gyumri	Armenian Premier League	9	32	2	2	28	23	120	8
2000	Gyumri	Armenian First League	9	16	1	1	14	11	58	4
2001	Aragats	Armenian First League	4	12	2	2	8	8	21	8
2002–present	-	no participation	-	-	-	-	-	-	-	-
