= FC Lernagorts Kapan =

Lernagorts Kapan
- Full name: Football Club Lernagorts Kapan
- Founded: 1963; 62 years ago
- Dissolved: 2006; 19 years ago
- Ground: Lernagorts Stadium; Kapan
- Capacity: 3,500

FC Lernagorts Kapan (Armenian: Ֆուտբոլային Ակումբ Լեռնագործ Կապան), is a defunct Armenian football club from Kapan, Syunik Province.

== History ==
Lernagorts Kapan was founded in 1963 during the Soviet period. After the independence of Armenia, the club participated in the first Armenian football competition after the split-up from the Soviet Union under the name Syunik Kapan. After the regular competition, they qualified for the championship stage, where they finished in 6th position, thus being qualified for the highest level in the 1993 season. However, they withdrew before the start of the season. Since then they have been up and down between the two divisions of the Armenian football league system.

In 2004, Lernagorts Kapan attempted to merge with Ararat Yerevan, but the merger failed. However, they played under the name Lernagorts-Ararat Kapan during the 2005 Armenian Premier League season, after a partnership agreement with Ararat Yerevan. In 2006, the club withdrew from the Armenian Premier League competition. Since then, the club has been inactive from professional football.

== Name changes ==
- 1963–89: FC Lernagorts Kapan
- 1989–90: FC Kapan
- 1991–93: FC Syunik Kapan
- 1995–96: FC Kapan-81
- 1997–04: FC Lernagorts Kapan
- 2004–06: FC Lernagorts-Ararat Kapan

== Achievements ==
- SSR Armenia League
  - Winners (2): 1989, 1991
- SSR Armenia Cup
  - Winners (1): 1963

== European history ==
Season	Competition	Round	Opponent	Home	Away	Aggregate
2005	UEFA Intertoto Cup	1R	(Switzerland) Neuchâtel Xamax	1–3	0–6	1–9

== Managers ==
- (Armenian Soviet Socialist Republic) Vladimir Petrosyan (1990)
- (Armenian Soviet Socialist Republic) Felix Veranyan (1991–92)
- (Armenia) Vladimir Petrosyan (1992–93)
- (Armenia) Felix Veranyan (????–00)
- (Armenia) Garnik Asatryan (2000–01)
- (Armenia) Arsen Chilingaryan (2001)
- (Armenia) Avetik Sarkisyan (2001–02)
- (Armenia) Samvel Nikolyan (2002)
- (Armenia) Garnik Ohanjanyan (2002–03)
- (Armenia) Vardan Javadyan (2003–04)
