= FC Dvin Artashat =

Dvin Artashat
- Full name: Football Club Dvin Artashat
- Founded: 1982; 43 years ago
- Dissolved: 1999; 26 years ago
- Ground: Artashat City Stadium
- Capacity: 5,000

Dvin Artashat (Armenian: Ֆուտբոլային Ակումբ Դվին Արտաշատ), is a defunct Armenian football club from Artashat, Ararat Province. It was founded in 1982 under the name Olympia Artashat. After the independence of Armenia, the club participated in the domestic competitions under the name FC Artashat, between 1992 and 1993. In 1995, the club was renamed FC Dvin Artashat. However, after the 1999 Armenian Premier League season, the club was dissolved and is currently inactive from any professional football in Armenia.

== League record ==
Year	Club Name	Division	Position	GP	W	D	L	GS	GA	PTS
1992	FC Artashat	Armenian First League	4	10	4	0	6	16	26	8
1993	FC Artashat	Armenian First League	2	22	14	5	3	56	22	33
1994	-	no participation	-	-	-	-	-	-	-	-
1995	Dvin Artashat	Armenian First League	5	14	5	2	7	19	21	17
1995–96	Dvin Artashat	Armenian First League	9	22	7	3	12	34	50	24
1996–97	Dvin Artashat	Armenian First League	1	22	15	5	2	54	18	50
1997	Dvin Artashat	Armenian Premier League	9	18	1	4	13	16	52	7
1998	Dvin Artashat	Armenian Premier League	7	20	8	5	7	41	36	29
1999	Dvin Artashat	Armenian Premier League	8	32	2	2	28	20	116	8
2000–present	-	no participation	-	-	-	-	-	-	-	-
