= Kasakh FC =

Kasakh Football CLub
- Full name: Kasakh Football Club
- Founded: 1985; 40 years ago
- Dissolved: 1999; 26 years ago
- Ground: Kasakhi Marzik Stadium, Ashtarak
- Capacity: 3,600

Kasakh Football Club (Armenian: Քասախ Ֆուտբոլային Ակումբ) is a defunct Armenian football club from Ashtarak, Aragatsotn Province.

The club was founded as Olympia Ashtarak in 1985. After the independence of Armenia in 1991, the club was renamed Kasakh FC. However, it was dissolved in 1999 and the players of the team joined the newly founded club Mika-Kasakh Ashtarak.
