= BMA-Arai Echmiadzin =

BMA-Arai Etchmiadzin
- Full name: BMA-Arai Etchmiadzin
- Founded: 1967; 58 years ago
- Dissolved: 1997; 28 years ago
- Ground: Etchmiadzin Stadium; Vagharshapat
- Capacity: 3,000

BMA-Arai Echmiadzin (Armenian: ԲՄԱ Արայ Էջմիածին), is a defunct Armenian football club from the town of Vagharshapat (Etchmiadzin), Armavir Province.

== History ==
The club was founded in 1967 during the Soviet period. Before the formation of Championship of Independent Armenia, the team itself is nowhere really could not show, only in 1990 start a professional stage in the second league of the USSR where they were in the 7th place.

In 1992 the team performed in the championship of Armenia in the Premier League, on the basis of which they occupied 10th place and booked a place in the highest league in the next year.

In the Armenian Cup the team reached the quarterfinals and beat team Van Yerevan 0–2. These results remain the best in the history of the team's performance in the elite league of the Armenian championship. Though poor results in subsequent seasons which was 13th and 14th sent the team in lower division in the First League, where they will continue the performance. In the unofficial championship of 1995 team takes third place and bronze medals. However, through the biennial team will come down from competing in the tournament.

== League record ==
Year	Club Name	Division	Position	GP	W	D	L	GS	GA	PTS
1990	Zvartnots Echmiadzin	Armenian SSR League	7	32	12	8	12	53	60	32
1991	Zvartnots Echmiadzin	Armenian SSR League	11	38	14	4	20	59	76	32
1992	Zvartnots Echmiadzin	Armenian Premier League	10	22	3	5	14	30	61	11
1993	Zvartnots Echmiadzin	Armenian Premier League	13	28	6	4	18	42	78	16
1994	BMA-Arai Echmiadzin	Armenian Premier League	14	28	5	5	18	38	85	15
1995	BMA-Arai Echmiadzin	Armenian First League	3	14	8	1	5	35	9	25
1995–96	BMA-Arai Echmiadzin	Armenian First League	10	22	7	2	13	26	44	23
1996–97	BMA-Arai Echmiadzin	Armenian First League	10	22	6	7	9	24	28	25
1997	BMA-Arai Echmiadzin	Armenian First League	7	16	4	1	11	25	45	13
1998–present	BMA-Arai Echmiadzin	no participation								

== Head coach ==
- (Soviet Union) B. Yeghiazaryan (1990)
- (Soviet Union) Samvel Ayvazian (1991)
- (Armenia) Arkady Andriasyan (1992–1993)
- (Armenia) Ashot Martirosyan (1993)
- (Armenia) Rudik Avanesyan (1993)
- (Armenia) Gevond Pogosyan (1994)
