= Erebuni SC =

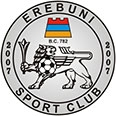
- Full name: Erebuni Sport Club
- Founded: 2007; 19 years ago
- Dissolved: 2019; 7 years ago
- Ground: Hmayak Khachatryan Stadium, Yerevan
- Capacity: 544
- Owner: Tigran Ayvazyan
- President: Tigran Ayvazyan
- League: N/A
- 2018–19: Armenian First League, 12th (expelled)
Home colours	Away colours

Erebuni Sport Club (Armenian: Էրեբունի Սպորտային Ակումբ), was an Armenian football club based in the capital Yerevan. Founded as a football school for young players in 2007, the club entered the Armenian football league system in 2016.

== History ==
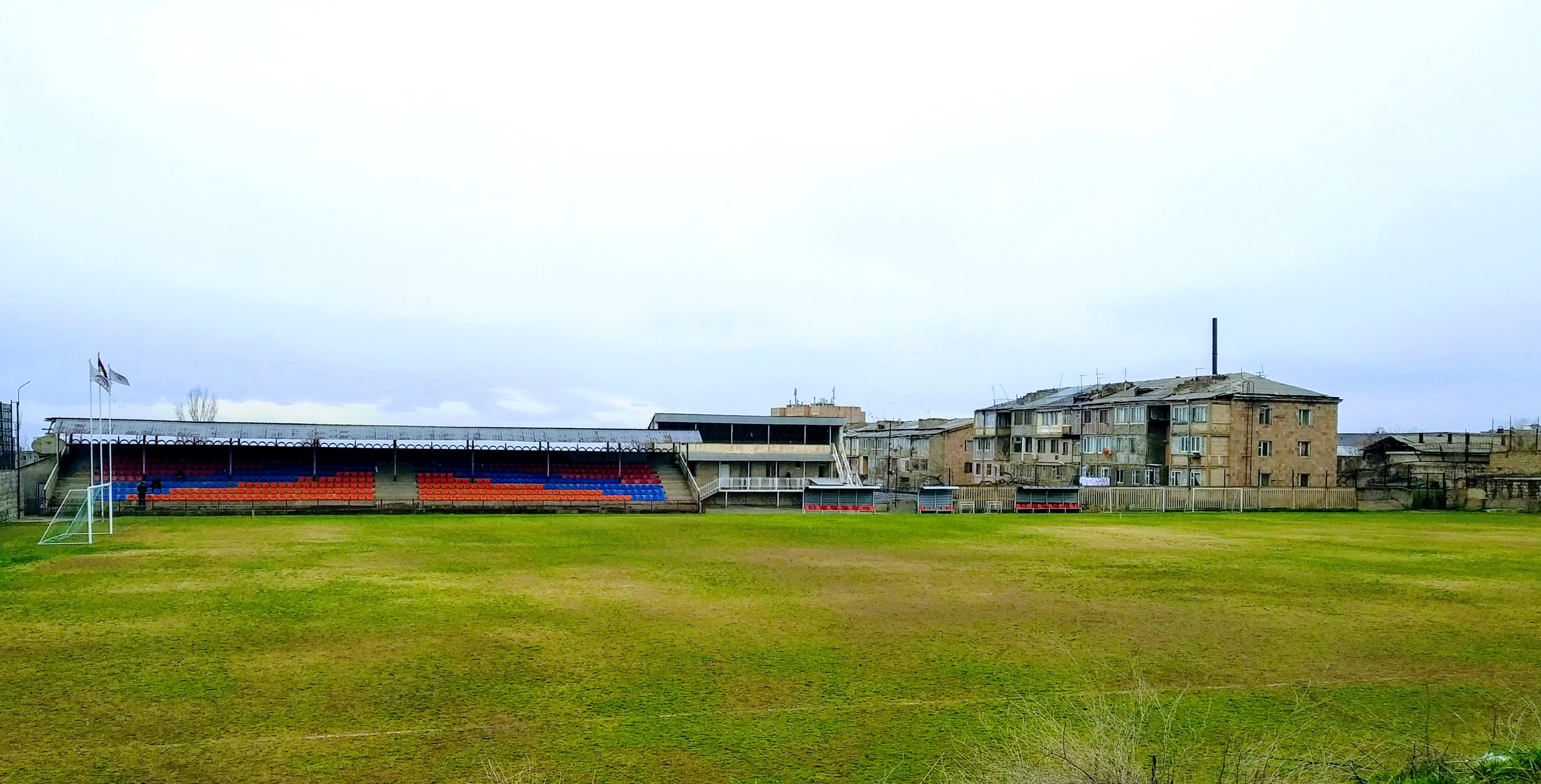
Hmayak Khachatryan Stadium

In 2007, the club was founded as a youth football school under the ownership of Tigran Ayvazyan, based in the Erebuni District of Yerevan.

In June 2016, it was announced that the club was revived on the basis of the Erebuni football school located in the Erebuni District of Yerevan. The club made its debut in the 2016–17 Armenian First League season. After the completion of the season, the club declined promotion and stayed in the First League.

On 28 February 2019, the FFA suspended the rights of Erebuni to continue competing in the second part of the 2018–19 Armenian First League and the club was expelled from the competition, plus a fine of AMD 500,000.

== Last squad ==
As of 31 December 2018

Note: Flags indicate national team as defined under FIFA eligibility rules; some limited exceptions apply. Players may hold more than one non-FIFA nationality.

No.	Pos.	Nation	Player
1	GK	ARM	Ashot Ayvazyan
3	DF	ARM	Artak Baghdasaryan
4	DF	ARM	Karlen Khachatryan
6	DF	ARM	Gagik Ghaplanyan
7	MF	ARM	Sos Tadevosyan (captain)
8	MF	ARM	Arsen Darbinyan
9	FW	ARM	Grigor Israelyan
10	FW	ARM	Edvard Yenokyan
11	MF	ARM	Arsen Mirzoyan
12	DF	ARM	Aleksandr Nalbandyan
14	MF	ARM	Arsen Hakobyan (vice-captain)
16	MF	ARM	Gor Manucharyan
17	MF	ARM	Erik Kotanjyan
19	GK	ARM	Henrik Matevosyan
20	DF	ARM	Armen Davidyan

No.	Pos.	Nation	Player
21	DF	ARM	Edgar Mkrtchyan
22	FW	ARM	Norayr Artemyan
23	MF	ARM	Harutyun Hakhverdyan
24	DF	ARM	Davit Hovhannisyan
—	MF	ARM	Arstak Gagikyan
—	MF	ARM	Mark Bakhtamyan
—	MF	ARM	Karen Mnatsakanyan
—	MF	ARM	Alen Poghosyan
—	MF	ARM	Davit Ayvazyan
—	MF	ARM	Davit Zakharyan
—	MF	ARM	Yenok Yenokyan
—	MF	ARM	Arsen Darbinyan
—	FW	ARM	Erik Isahakyan
—	FW	ARM	Vardan Papeyan
