= FC Dinamo Yerevan =

Dinamo Yerevan
- Full name: Football Club Dinamo Yerevan
- Founded: 1936; 89 years ago 1992 (revived)
- Dissolved: 2008; 17 years ago
- Ground: Kasaghi Marzik Stadium; Ashtarak
- Capacity: 3,600
- Manager: Sevada Arzumanyan
- 2007: Armenian First League, 4th
Home colours	Away colours

FC Dinamo Yerevan (Armenian: Ֆուտբոլային Ակումբ Դինամո Երևան), was an Armenian football club from the capital Yerevan.

== History ==
The club was founded in 1936 during the Soviet period, winning many titles of the Armenian SSR championship.

After a long retirement from professional football, Dinamo Yerevan was revived in 1992 to participate in the domestic competitions. However, the club was dissolved in early 2008 and is currently inactive from professional football.

== League record ==
Year	Club Name	Division	Position	GP	W	D	L	GS	GA	PTS
1992	Dinamo Yerevan	Armenian First League	16	26	8	9	9	37	42	25
1993	Dinamo Yerevan	Armenian First League	6	20	9	3	8	30	21	21
1994	Dinamo Yerevan	Armenian First League	4	18	9	5	4	49	32	23
1995	Dinamo Yerevan	Armenian First League	2	12	7	3	2	40	12	24
1995–96	Dinamo Yerevan	Armenian First League	11	22	6	4	12	27	38	22
1996–97	Dinamo Yerevan	Armenian First League	8	22	7	4	11	23	41	25
1997	Dinamo Yerevan	Armenian First League	5	16	4	2	10	18	47	14
1998	Dinamo Yerevan	Armenian First League	10	24	6	1	17	26	65	19
1999	Dinamo Yerevan	Armenian First League	1	16	13	0	3	40	14	39
2000	Dinamo Yerevan	Armenian Premier League	8	28	1	4	23	19	78	7
2001	Dinamo Yerevan	Armenian First League	5	10	8	0	2	35	12	24
2002	Dinamo Yerevan	No Participation	-	-	-	-	-	-	-	-
2003	Dinamo Yerevan	Armenian First League	8	22	9	4	9	29	44	31
2004	Dinamo Yerevan	Armenian First League	12	30	9	1	20	52	72	28
2005	Dinamo Yerevan	Armenian First League	10	24	6	3	15	26	56	18
2006	Dinamo Yerevan	Armenian First League	5	18	9	4	5	36	34	31
2007	Dinamo Yerevan	Armenian First League	4	21	10	3	8	47	38	33
2008	-	Dissolved	-	-	-	-	-	-	-	-

== See also ==
- Football in Armenia
