= Erebuni-Homenmen FC =

- Full name: Erebuni-Homenmen Football Club
- Founded: 1992
- Dissolved: 2000
- Ground: Erebuni Stadium, Yerevan
- Capacity: 544
- Final season 1999: Armenian Premier League, 6th

Erebuni-Homenmen Football Club (Armenian: Էրեբունի-ՀՄՄ Ֆուտբոլային Ակումբ), is a defunct Armenian professional football club that was based in the capital Yerevan.

== History ==
The club was founded as Homenmen-FIMA FC in 1992 in the Armenian capital Yerevan, representing the sporting club of the Armenian State Institute of Physical Culture. They participated in the first ever Armenian football competition in 1992 after the split-up from the Soviet Union. After the regular competition they qualified for the championship stage where they finished in the 9th position. As a result, they have qualified for the highest level in the 1993 season.

In 1995, the club became known as Homenmen Yerevan FC, representing the pan-Armenian sports and scouting organization Homenmen (founded in Aleppo in 1921). In 1997, the club was renamed as Erebuni-Homenmen FC. In 1999, the Homenmen organization withdrew its sponsorship from the club. As a result, the team was forced to retire from professional football at the beginning of 2000, due to financial difficulties.

In spite of several sponsoring changes and financial obstacles, the club had never been relegated form the Armenian Premier League.

== Domestic record ==
Competition	Pld	Pos	W	D	L	GF	GA	GD	Pts	Armenian Cup

== Erebuni-Homenmen in the European cups ==
Competition	Pld	W	D	L	GF	GA
UEFA Intertoto Cup	2	0	1	1	1	7

Season	Competition	Round	Club	1st leg	2nd leg
1998	UEFA Intertoto Cup	1R	(Georgia (country)) Torpedo Kutaisi	0–6	**1 – 1**

- Home results are noted in **bold**
