= FC Armavir (Armenia) =

Armavir
- Full name: Football Club Armavir
- Founded: 1965; 60 years ago
- Dissolved: 2003; 22 years ago
- Ground: Yubileynyi Stadion, Armavir
- Capacity: 3,300

FC Armavir (Armenian: Ֆուտբոլային Ակումբ Արմավիր) is a defunct football club from Armavir, Armavir Province, Armenia. It was founded in 1965 as FC Sevan Hoktemberyan. After the collapse of the Soviet Union, FC Armavir participated in the Armenian Leagues throughout the 1990s. The club was dissolved in 2003.

== Name changes ==
- 1965–1981: FC Sevan Hoktemberyan
- 1981–1990: FC Spartak Hoktemberyan
- 1990–1995: FC Araks Armavir
- 1995–2001: FC Armavir
- 2001–2002: FC Karmrakhayt Armavir
- 2002–2003: FC Armavir
