= Arabkir FC =

FC Arabkir
- Full name: Football Club Arabkir
- Founded: 1977; 48 years ago
- Dissolved: 1997; 28 years ago
- Ground: Nairi Stadium, Yerevan
- Capacity: 6,800
Home colours	Away colours

FC Arabkir (Armenian: Ֆուտբոլային Ակումբ Արաբկիր), is a defunct Armenian football club from the capital Yerevan. The club was founded in 1977 during the Soviet years as FC Kanaz Yerevan, representing the Armenian SSR Kanaker aluminum smelter, currently known as Rusal Armenal. In 1995, the club was renamed FC Arabkir after the Arabkir District of Yerevan. However, Arabkir was dissolved in 1997 due to financial difficulties.

== League record ==
Year	Club Name	Division	Position	GP	W	D	L	GS	GA	PTS
1992	Kanaz Yerevan	Armenian Premier League	11	22	3	3	16	29	62	9
1993	Kanaz Yerevan	Armenian Premier League	10	28	8	4	16	37	75	20
1994	Kanaz Yerevan	Armenian Premier League	15	28	1	3	24	15	89	5
1995	Arabkir	Armenian First League	1	14	12	0	2	37	12	36
1995–96	Arabkir	Armenian First League	1	22	15	2	5	58	22	47
1996–97	Arabkir	Armenian Premier League	10	22	4	0	18	20	89	12
1997–present	-	no participation	-	-	-	-	-	-	-	-

== Achievements ==
- SSR Armenia League: 1

1978
