= Nairi SC =

- Full name: Nairi Sports Club
- Founded: 1954; 72 years ago
- Ground: Nairi Stadium, Yerevan
- Capacity: 6,800

Nairi SC (Armenian: Նաիրի Մարզական ակումբ) is an Armenian football club from the capital Yerevan. The club was dissolved in 2000, but returned to play in the new Amateur A-League since 2022–23 season, however, before the start of 2024–25 season, the club withdrew. They have returned in the 2026-27 season to play in the Amateur B-League.

== League record ==
Year	Club Name	Division	Position	GP	W	D	L	GS	GA	GD	PTS
1990	Nairi Yerevan	Armenian SSR League	12	32	10	7	15	57	60	-3	27
1991	Nairi Yerevan	Armenian SSR League	15	38	10	9	19	60	80	-20	29
1992	Nairi Yerevan	Armenian Premier League	8	22	6	5	11	26	52	-26	17
1993	Nairit Yerevan	Armenian Premier League	9	28	8	4	16	29	61	-32	20
1994	Nairit Yerevan	Armenian Premier League	12	28	7	6	15	22	43	-21	20
1995	Nairit Yerevan	Armenian First League	6	14	5	1	8	18	19	-1	16
1995–96	Nairit Yerevan	Armenian First League	7	22	9	3	10	42	50	-8	30
1996–97	Nairit Yerevan	Armenian First League	4	22	9	7	6	48	32	+16	34
1997	Nairit Yerevan	Armenian First League	4	16	9	1	6	38	16	+22	28
1998	Nairit Yerevan	Armenian First League	3	24	17	2	5	48	24	+24	53
1999	Nairit Yerevan	Armenian First League	5	16	7	3	6	23	25	-2	24
2000–22	Nairi Yerevan	no participation									
2022–23	Nairi Yerevan	Amateur A-League	3	8	5	0	3	30	7	+23	15
2023–24	Nairi Yerevan	Amateur A-League	4	10	5	1	4	31	26	+5	16
2024–2026	Nairi SC	no participation									
2026-27	Nairi SC	Amateur B-League	a	s	d	f	g	h	j	k	l
