= FC Kotayk =

- Full name: Football Club Kotayk
- Founded: 1955; 71 years ago
- Dissolved: 2016; 10 years ago
- Ground: Kotayk Stadium, Abovyan
- Capacity: 3,946
- Chairman: Samvel Petrosyan
- Manager: Tigran Yesayan
- League: Armenian First League
- 2016-17: Armenian First League, 8th (withdrew)
Home colours	Away colours

FC Kotayk (Armenian: Ֆուտբոլային Ակումբ Կոտայք) was an Armenian football club based in the town of Abovyan, Kotayk Province.

== History ==
Founded in 1955, Kotayk was one of the oldest football clubs in Armenia. After playing several years in the Armenian SSR League as well as the Soviet First League, Kotayk made their debut in the Armenian Premier League in 1992.

They participated in the European Cups for the first time in 1996–97. In the UEFA Cup Winners' Cup winning 1–0 at home against AEK Larnaca from Cyprus. After losing the 2nd leg away from home with a result of 0–5, they were eliminated.

However, the club was dissolved in 2005 due to both financial and non-financial shortcomings.

In June 2016, many Armenian football websites announced that the club will return to professional football with the assistance of many contributors from the Kotayk Province, under the management of Samvel Petrosyan. After playing few games in the Armenian First League, the club was forced to leave the competition due to financial difficulties.

== League record ==
Year	Division	Position	GP	W	D	L	GS	GA	PTS
1978	Soviet Second League	7	46	23	5	18	66	64	51
1979	Soviet Second League	5	46	26	6	14	83	43	58
1980	Soviet Second League	2	30	19	4	7	62	24	42
1981	Soviet Second League	1	44	29	10	5	79	37	68
1982	Soviet Second League	1	32	23	3	6	80	29	49
1983	Soviet Second League	2	32	18	10	4	72	40	46
1984	Soviet Second League	1	32	21	4	7	66	34	46
1985	Soviet First League	10	42	16	5	21	54	65	37
1986	Soviet First League	19	46	14	13	19	46	54	40
1987	Soviet First League	13	42	15	8	19	55	59	38
1988	Soviet First League	18	42	14	7	21	55	83	35
1989	Soviet First League	9	42	19	7	16	60	53	45
1990	Soviet First League	14	38	12	9	17	44	52	33
1991	Soviet First League	17	42	15	7	20	30	48	37
1992	Armenian Premier League	7	22	7	3	12	32	45	17
1993	Armenian Premier League	11	28	9	1	18	57	76	19
1994	Armenian Premier League	7	28	12	3	13	73	53	27
1995	Armenian Premier League	3	10	4	3	3	18	13	15
1995–96	Armenian Premier League	6	22	11	3	8	31	33	36
1996–97	Armenian Premier League	7	22	8	4	10	41	27	28
1997	Armenian Premier League	7	18	5	4	9	31	33	19
1998	no participation								
1999	no participation								
2000	Armenian First League	4	16	9	6	9	36	27	28
2001	Armenian Premier League	10	22	3	3	16	19	65	12
2002	Armenian Premier League	11	22	2	5	15	17	62	11
2003	Armenian Premier League	5	28	8	7	13	29	56	31
2004	Armenian Premier League	7	28	6	6	16	31	54	24
2005	Armenian Premier League	4	20	8	7	5	22	19	31
2005–2016	no participation								
2016-17	Armenian First League (withdrew)	8	7	x	x	x	x	x	x
2016–present	no participation								

== Honours ==
- SSR Armenia League: 4

1967, 1973, 1975, 1976

== Kotayk in European competitions ==
Summary

Competition	Pld	W	D	L	GF	GA
UEFA Cup Winners' Cup	2	1	0	1	1	5
UEFA Intertoto Cup	2	1	0	1	3	3
Total	4	2	0	2	4	8

Matches

Season	Competition	Round	Club	1st leg	2nd leg
1996–97	UEFA Cup Winners' Cup	QR	(Cyprus) AEK Larnaca	**1–0**	0–5
2003	UEFA Intertoto Cup	1R	(Czech Republic) Brno	0–1	**3–2**

- Home results are noted in **bold**
