= FC Van Yerevan =

Van Yerevan
- Full name: Football Club Van Yerevan
- Founded: 1990; 35 years ago
- Dissolved: 1997; 28 years ago
- Ground: Nairi Stadium; Yerevan
- Capacity: 6,800

FC Van Yerevan (Armenian: Ֆուտբոլային Ակումբ Վան Երևան) was an Armenian football club from the capital Yerevan, founded in 1990.

== History ==
This club is named in honor of the Armenian historic city of Van, which was once the capital of the Urartu Kingdom. The club participated in the first Armenian soccer championship, which took fifth place overall. During the six seasons the club has always participated in the Premier League. The team has strong problems, and the place occupied by the team were in the range from 4th to 10th position. But so, the club was disbanded in 1997 at the end of the championship.

== League record ==
Year	Club Name	Division	Position	GP	W	D	L	GS	GA	PTS
1992	Van Yerevan	Armenian Premier League	5	22	11	1	10	48	53	23
1993	Van Yerevan	Armenian Premier League	5	28	15	2	11	71	49	32
1994	Van Yerevan	Armenian Premier League	10	28	9	4	15	34	72	22
1995	Van Yerevan	Armenian Premier League	4	10	4	1	5	15	21	13
1995–96	Van Yerevan	Armenian Premier League	8	22	7	3	12	42	42	24
1996–97	Van Yerevan	Armenian Premier League	6	22	11	1	10	41	34	34
1997–present	-	no participation	-	-	-	-	-	-	-	-

== Coaching history ==
- (Armenia) Azad Mangasarian (1992)
- (Armenia) Arsen Chilingaryan (1992–1993)
- (Armenia) Edward Asoyan (1993–1995)
- (Armenia) Varuzhan Sukiasyan (1995)
- (Armenia) Levon Hakobyan (1996)
- (Armenia) Ashot Khachatryan (1996–1997)
