= Football in Armenia =

- Country: Armenia
- Governing body: Football Federation of Armenia
- National team: Armenia men's national team

National competitions
- Armenian Cup

Club competitions
- Armenian Premier League Armenian First League Armenian Amateur A League Armenian Amateur B League

International competitions
- Champions League; Europa League; UEFA Conference League; UEFA Super Cup; FIFA World Cup (national team); European Championship (national team); UEFA Nations League (national team)

Football (Armenian: ֆուտբոլ futbol) is the most popular sport in Armenia.

As of December 2024, the Armenia national football team is 100th in FIFA World Rankings. Since gaining independence in 1991, Armenia has had its own national association that takes part in all FIFA competitions (Senior, Youth and Women's Football). FC Ararat Yerevan were one of the leading teams in the top league in the Soviet Union, often playing in European club competitions.

A number of Armenian players played for the USSR national team, including Khoren Oganesian at the 1982 FIFA World Cup and Eduard Markarov in the 1960s. Markarov later became assistant coach of the Soviet Union's youth team, and was part of the coaching staff at the FIFA World Youth Championship in Portugal in 1991, when the team finished 3rd.

== History ==
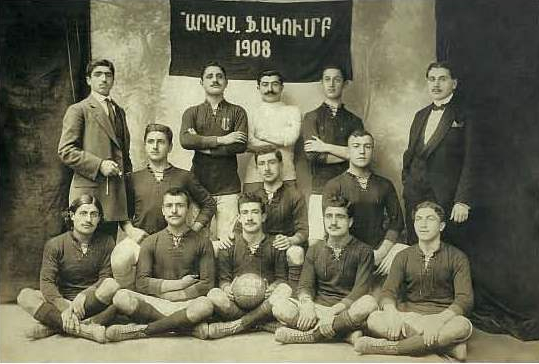
Araks Football Club, Constantinople, 1910s.

=== Early period (before 1920s) ===
In the early 20th century, the first Armenian football clubs were founded in Constantinople, Smyrna and many other cities within the Ottoman Empire.

The first game between Armenian and Turkish teams was recorded in 1906. Armenian club called Balta-Liman (after a neighborhood of Constantinople, now called Baltalimanı) met with Galatasaray. Later, Balta-Liman was dissolved and two new clubs were founded: Araks and Tork. Football's growth across many ethnic groups in the Ottoman Empire was influenced by Armenian sports clubs, which were important in the process forming the region's sports culture.

However, the break-out of World War I and the Armenian genocide led to a major decline of Armenian involvement in Ottoman sports.

=== Soviet era (1920s-1991) ===
Oldest records of football teams in Soviet Armenia goes back to 1926-1927, when the Trans-Caucasian Championship was organized in Tbilisi. Three South Caucasus countries participated: Armenia, Azerbaijan and Georgia.

The first professional club in Armenia was established in 1935 as Spartak and was later renamed Ararat. FC Ararat Yerevan grew and became the most popular club in Armenia. Ararat became one of the most competitive teams in the Soviet Union in 1973 after winning the Soviet Championship and the Soviet Cup. The team did well in European competitions as well; in 1975, it advanced to the European Cup quarterfinals, losing to the eventual champions, Franz Beckenbauer's FC Bayern Munich. The first stadium in Armenia was named Spartak as well, built in the late 1920s in front of what is now the Yerevan Circus.

In 1958, FC Shirak was founded in Gyumri (then Leninakan), and played in the Soviet First League until Armenia's independence in 1991.

=== Independent Armenia (1992—present) ===
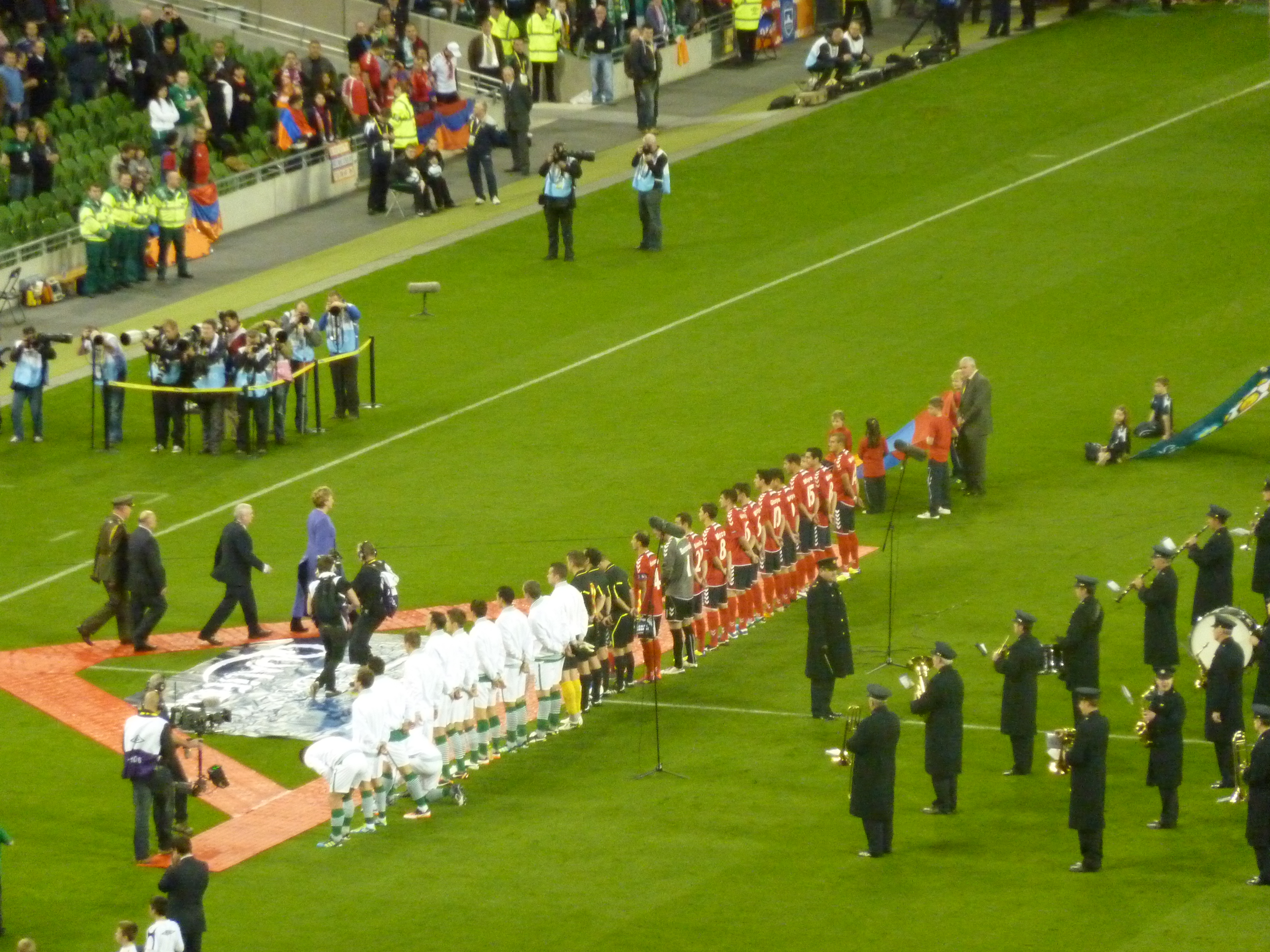
October 11, 2011, Ireland vs. Armenia, Aviva Stadium, Dublin

Football became the most popular sport in independent Armenia. Armenia became an independent state in 1991, the Armenian SSR having previously played for the Soviet Union national football team. The Football Federation of Armenia was founded on 18 January 1992 and established relations with FIFA in 1992 and with UEFA in 1993. The history of the Armenia national team began on 14 October 1992, when Armenia played its first match against Moldova. That meeting ended in a goalless draw. Since 1996, the team is a member of qualifiers European and World Championships. Armenia has competed in every UEFA Euro qualification and FIFA World Cup qualification since 1994.

However, the lack of financial resources forced many clubs in Yerevan and other provinces to retire from professional football. In 2016, only 6 clubs from Yerevan, 1 from Gyumri, and 1 from Kapan were practicing professional football and taking part in the Armenian football league system.

Many football stadiums were built in Soviet Armenia during the final decade of the 20th century. Many of the Soviet-era stadiums are still in bad conditions. However, FFA is now trying to develop the infrastructure across the country with few stadiums being renovated such as in Abovyan, Armavir, Vanadzor and many more fields across the regions. Very few of the professional clubs either possess their own stadium or football training academy.

== Academies, training centres and stadiums ==
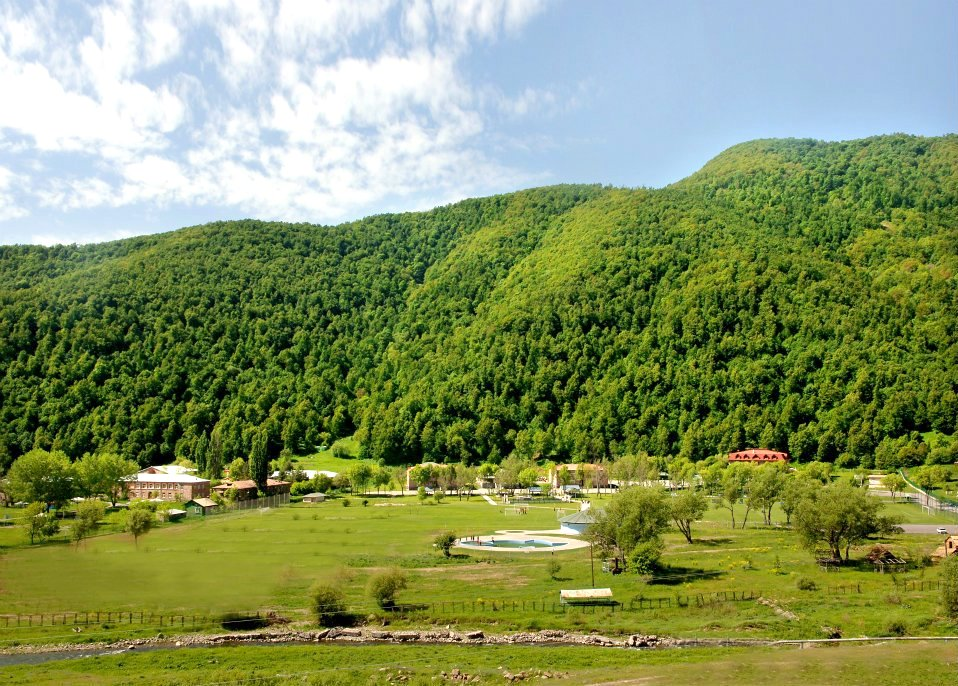
Zepyur Football Training Camp in Kotayk Province

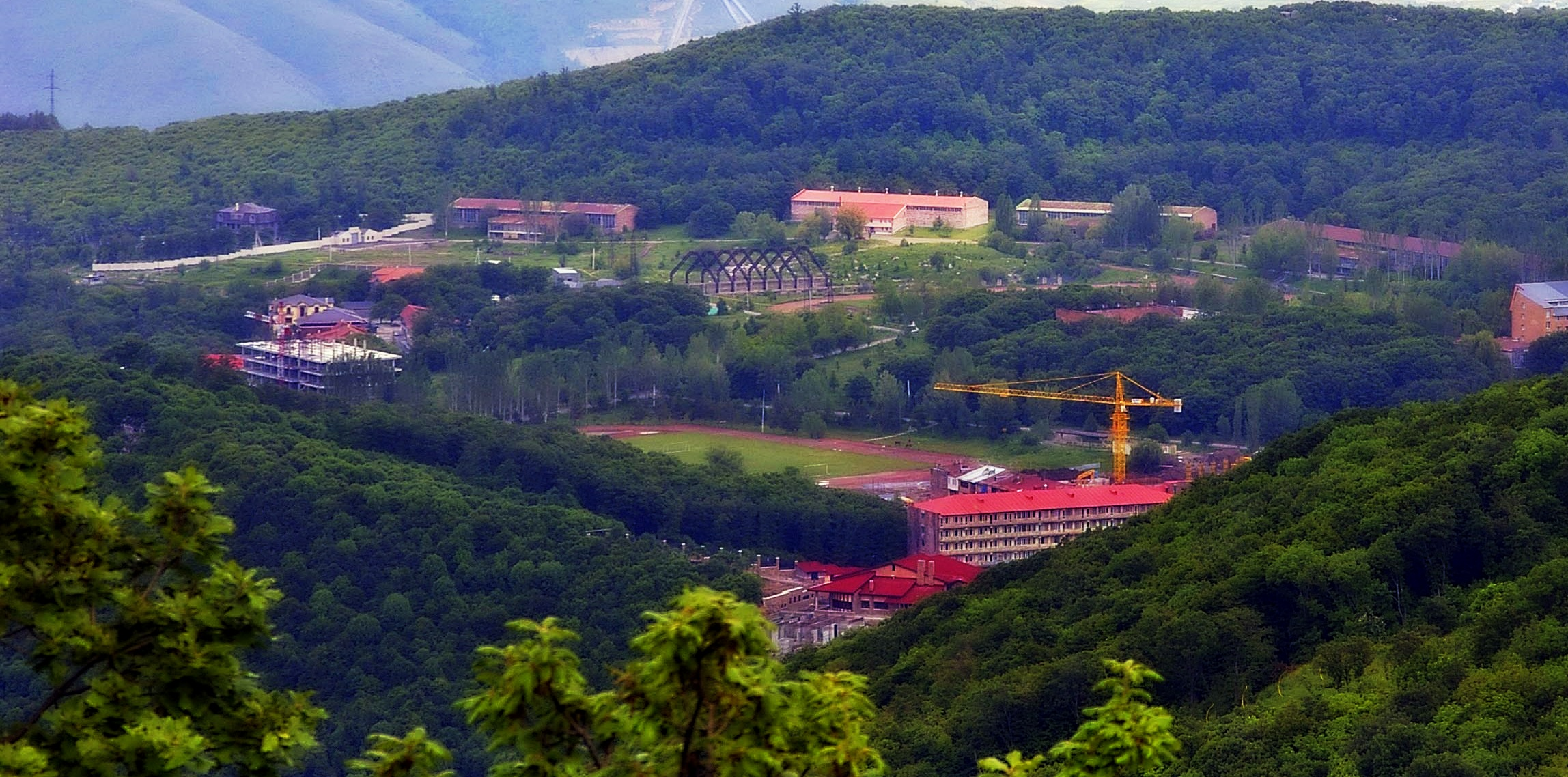
Tsaghkadzor Olympic Sports Complex

Armenia has many football academies and training centers. These facilities allow players to develop their skills. Some academies are opened and sponsored by professional clubs like FC Pyunik and FC Ararat Yerevan, while the Football Federation of Armenia also has an academy. These centers provide access to training pitches and coaching.

=== Academies of professional football clubs ===
- Pyunik Training Centre, FC Pyunik: located in Kentron District, Yerevan. It is home to 1 natural grass and 1 artificial turf regular-sized pitches, in addition to many other small training grounds.
- Urartu Training Centre, FC Urartu: located in Malatia-Sebastia District, Yerevan. It is home to 2 natural-grass and 1 artificial turf regular-sized pitches as well as the Urartu Stadium.
- Dzoraghbyur Training Centre, FC Ararat Yerevan: located in Dzoraghbyur village, Kotayk Province. It is home to 3 natural-grass and 1 artificial turf regular-sized pitches.
- FC Syunik Training Centre, FC Syunik: located in Kapan, Syunik Province. It is home to 1 natural-grass and 1 artificial turf regular-sized pitches.
- Noah Park, FC Noah: located in Vagharshapat, Armavir Province. Opened in 2019 as the Vagharshapat football academy, it is home to 2 natural-grass and 2 artificial turf regular-sized pitches. It was completely renovated and reopened as Noah Park in May 2026.
- Sardarapat FC Football Academy, Sardarapat: located in Armenia, Armavir Province. Opened in 2020, it is home to 2 natural-grass and 1 artificial turf regular-sized pitches.

=== Academies of the Football Federation of Armenia ===
- Technical Center-Academy of the Football Federation of Armenia, located in Avan District, Yerevan: is home to 6 natural-grass and 3 artificial turf regular-sized pitches as well as the main stadium.
- Gyumri Football Academy of the Football Federation of Armenia, located in Gyumri, Shirak Province: is home to 4 natural-grass and 2 artificial turf regular-sized pitches.
- Vanadzor Football Academy of the Football Federation of Armenia, located in Vanadzor, Lori Province, is home to 3 natural-grass and 1 artificial turf regular-sized pitches.

=== Other training centres ===
- Zepyur Football Training Camp, located in Pyunik village, Kotayk Province: is home to 2 natural-grass regular-sized pitches.
- Tsaghkadzor Olympic Sports Complex in the town of Tsaghkadzor, Kotayk Province, with 2 natural football training fields and other facilities.

=== Future academies ===
- Juventus Academy Armenia, designed to operate across distinct locations: Avan and Kentron training bases in Yerevan and Nor Hachn training base in Kotayk.
- Benfica Academy Armenia, is scheduled to open in Yerevan ahead of the 2027-28 football season.

Many stadiums in Yerevan, Vanadzor, and Armavir underwent renovations and upgrading works. The main stadium that hosts the national team's games and also matches international standards is the National Stadium, named after Vazgen Sargsyan. The famous Hrazdan Stadium, which also hosted FC Bayern Munich back in the 1970s, does not meet the highest standards by the UEFA and FIFA.

== National team ==
The Armenia national football team is the national football team of Armenia and is controlled by the Football Federation of Armenia. After the dissolution of the Soviet Union, the team played its first international match against Moldova on October 12, 1992. Armenia became a member of FIFA and UEFA in the 1990s after gaining independence. This allowed the national team to compete in international tournaments, including the World cup and UEFA European Championship qualifiers and the UEFA Nations League. The team has never qualified for a major tournament, but there have been some memorable moments where the national team were close to qualifying for the final stage of the tournaments. In the UEFA Euro 2012 qualifiers, Armenia finished just a few points away from reaching the playoffs. Over the years, Armenia has had some talented players who played on the highest international stages. The most famous player is Henrikh Mkhitaryan, who played for top European clubs like Borussia Dortmund, Manchester United F.C., and AS Roma. Now, Mkhitaryan is a part of Inter Milan's championship team. Players like Yura Movsisyan and Marcos Pizzelli also played for famous teams.

A women's team, an under-21 team, an under-19 team, and an under-17 team also compete.

== Major clubs ==
With the most Armenian Premier League championships, FC Pyunik is considered as one of the most powerful teams in modern Armenian football. Other strong teams that compete at the highest level are FC Noah, FC Ararat-Armenia, and FC Urartu (previously FC Banants). Additionally, Armenian teams have participated in European leagues such as the UEFA Europa League and UEFA Conference League, but no Armenian club has advanced to the knockout stages of these competitions, with the teams only playing in the group stages. Armenian teams participate in these competitions annually.

== League system ==
=== 2026-27 ===
Level	League(s)/Division(s)
1	Armenian Premier League; 12 clubs
	↓↑ 1 club from each
2	Armenian First League; 14 clubs (including 8 reserve teams)
3	Amateur A-League ? clubs
4	Amateur B-League ? clubs (including ? reserve teams) divided into ? groups

== Attendances ==
The average attendance per top-flight football league season and the club with the highest average attendance:

Season	League average	Best club	Best club average
2015-16	620	Gandzasar FC	1,373
2014-15	452	Gandzasar FC	1,000
2013-14	564	Gandzasar FC	1,036
2012-13	687	Gandzasar FC	1,657

== See also ==
- List of football clubs in Armenia
- List of football stadiums in Armenia
