= Yepremyan =

Yepremyan or Yepremian (Armenian: Եփրեմյան) is an Armenian surname. Notable people with the surname include:

- Garo Yepremian (1944–2015), American football player
- Varuzhan Yepremyan (born 1959), Armenian painter

== See also ==
- Yeprem (disambiguation)
