= Football Federation of Armenia =

Association football governing body in Armenia

Coordinates: 40°10′34.75″N 44°31′16″E

UEFA
- Founded: 18 January 1992; 34 years ago
- Headquarters: Yerevan
- FIFA affiliation: 1992
- UEFA affiliation: 1992
- President: Armen Melikbekyan
- Website: www.ffa.am

The Football Federation of Armenia (FFA) (Armenian: Հայաստանի Ֆուտբոլի Ֆեդերացիա, Hayastani Futboli Federats’ia) is the governing body of football in Armenia. Its headquarters are located in Yerevan.

The Federation organizes the Armenian Premier League, the Armenian First League, the Armenian Super Cup, the Armenian Independence Cup, and the Armenian Futsal Premier League. It is responsible for appointing the management of the Armenia national football team, and the Armenia women's national football team. The Armenia national futsal team is also managed by the Federation.

The FFA was awarded a synthetic football turf pitch by FIFA through its GOAL programme.

== History ==
Armenia's official football history began in the early 1990s, but its traditions with the sport dates back further. The collapse of the Soviet Union and Armenia's declaration of independence in 1991 were significant moments in the country's sporting development, as well as in its political history. From a footballing perspective, those events prompted the founding, on 18 January 1992, of the Football Federation of Armenia.

The FFA duly became a member of the game's world and European governing bodies, FIFA and UEFA, in 1992. The national team made their competitive debut in qualification for the 1996 UEFA European Championship. Armenia kicked off with a 2–0 defeat against Belgium on 7 September 1994 yet also made history in that EURO '96 campaign. The team recorded their first competitive victory when they won 2–1 against Macedonia on 6 September 1995. Since then, Armenia has been a permanent fixture in EURO and World Cup qualifying tournaments, earning the notable achievement of finishing third in their UEFA Euro 2012 group, during which, talismanic attacking midfielder Henrikh Mkhitaryan, who then played in FC Shakhtar Donetsk, emerged as a player of top international caliber.

On an infrastructure level, work began in 2007 on a national-team training center and academy with residential facilities. The center opened in September 2010. The Yerevan Republican Stadium has also been partly redeveloped, with one particular benefit of this initiative being its impressive new playing surface. In recent years, around 90 small stadiums have been built throughout Armenia with the support of FIFA and the Government of Armenia.

On 15 June 2022, President of FIFA Gianni Infantino paid an official visit to Armenia to participate in events dedicated to the 30th anniversary of the Football Federation of Armenia. Infantino pledged his support to develop football in Armenia. Infantino met with Prime Minister Nikol Pashinyan and advised that FIFA will continue to support Armenia in the development of football infrastructure, including with the construction of a new national stadium.

== Staff ==
| Position | Name |
|---|---|
| President | Armen Melikbekyan |
| Vice President | Armen Nikoghosyan |
| General Secretary | Edgar Petrosyan |
| Technical Director | Suren Chakhalyan |
| Sports Director of National football teams | Armen Gyulbudaghyants |

=== Presidents ===
| Nr. | President | Years in power |
|---|---|---|
| 1. | Nikolay Ghazaryan | 1992–1994 |
| 2. | Armen Sargsyan | 1994–1998 |
| 3. | Suren Abrahamyan | 1998–2002 |
| 4. | Ruben Hayrapetyan | 2002–2018 |
| 5. | Artur Vanetsyan | 2018–2019 |
| 6. | Armen Melikbekyan | 2019– |

== See also ==
- Armenian Table Football Federation
- List of football clubs in Armenia
- List of football stadiums in Armenia
- Yerevan Football Academy
- Football in Armenia
