= Eighty Eight Hotel =

Hotel in Kotayk, Armenia

Eighty Eight Hotel and Spa
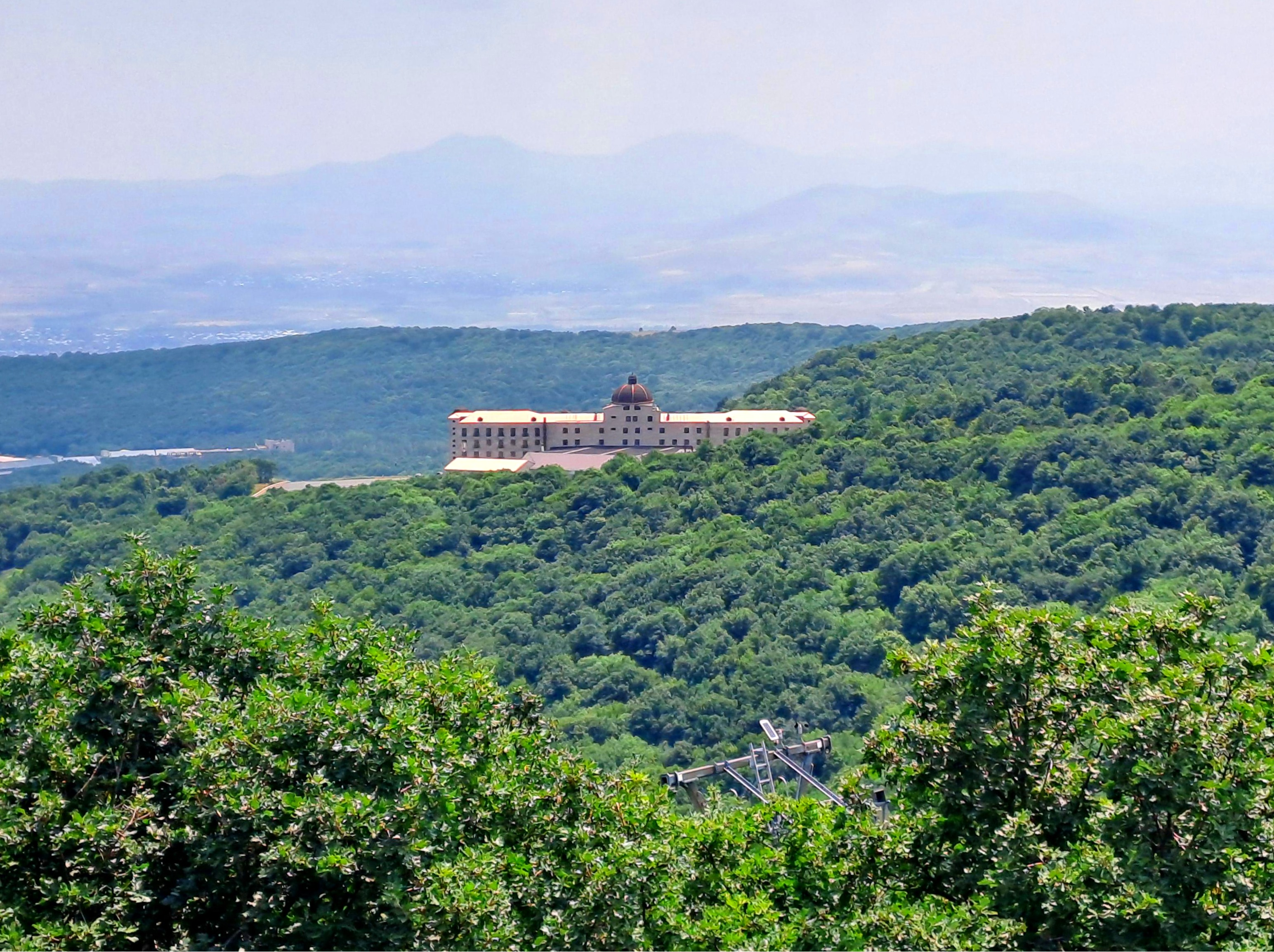

- Location within Armenia

General information
- Location: Tsaghkadzor, Kotayk; Armenia
- Coordinates: 40°31′48″N 44°41′45″E
- Opening: 2013

Technical details
- Floor count: 5

Other information
- Number of rooms: 120
- Number of suites: 26
- Number of restaurants: 2
- Parking: Yes

Website
- Official website

Eighty Eight Hotel Resort and Spa is a hotel in Tsaghkadzor, a popular resort town in Kotayk Province, Armenia. It was opened in 2013 as Golden Palace Hotel and Spa.

With 120 guestrooms, the Eighty Eight Hotel is the largest in Armenia outside the capital Yerevan.

== History and location ==
The 5-story domed hotel was officially opened on 2 March 2013 in the presence of president Serzh Sargsyan.

The hotel is located on a hill near Mount Teghenis of the Tsaghkunyats mountain range, approximately 2100 meters above sea level, around 55 km north of the capital Yerevan. The resort is adjacent to the Tsaghkadzor ski resort and the Tsaghkadzor ski lift, on 34/1 Tandzaghbyur Street. The Tsaghkadzor Olympic Sports Complex is also very close to the resort.

== Features ==
The hotel is home 120 guestrooms, including 26 suites, with royal and presidential categories. The hotel is home to four conference halls, a health and spa centre, an indoor swimming pool, an indoor tennis court, and a large billiards hall. The hotel is topped with a gold-coloured central dome, while the building is covered with white marble. Inside the dome of the hotel, the work of artist Ruben Yeghiazaryan can be seen on the ceiling.

The hotel has two restaurants and a cigar bar. The lobby bar of the hotel is the largest in Armenia.

=== Casino ===
Tsaghkadzor is one of the four towns of Armenia that are allowed to accommodate gambling houses and activities in urban settlements. The hotel is home to the "Senator Casino". It has three game halls. The Senator casino is among the largest entertainment centers in Armenia.

== Notable events ==
The hotel hosted the 2015 FIDE World Team Chess Championship between 18 and 29 April 2015. The opening ceremony of the championship took place in the large lobby of the hotel with an artistic performance attended by the president of Armenia Serzh Sargsyan (who is also the president of the Armenian Chess Federation), the FIDE president Kirsan Ilyumzhinov, and the delegates of the 10 participant countries. The event coincided with the 100th anniversary of the Armenian genocide which had its reflection in the opening ceremony. The Chinese national team had eventually won the title.
