= Sergo Karapetyan =

Armenian politician (1948–2021)

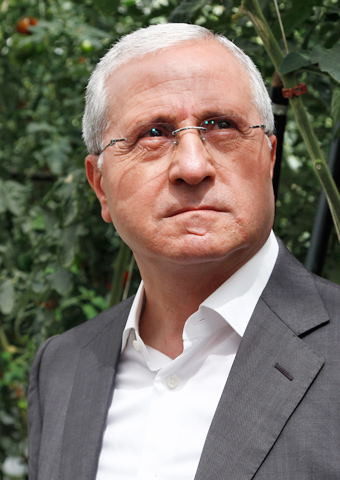

Agriculture Minister of Armenia
- In office 31 December 2010 – 20 September 2016
- President: Serzh Sargsyan
- Preceded by: Gerasim Alaverdyan
- Succeeded by: Ignati Araqelyan

Personal details
- Born: August 6, 1948 Artashat, Ararat Province, Armenian SSR, Soviet Union
- Died: February 18, 2021 (aged 72) Yerevan, Armenia

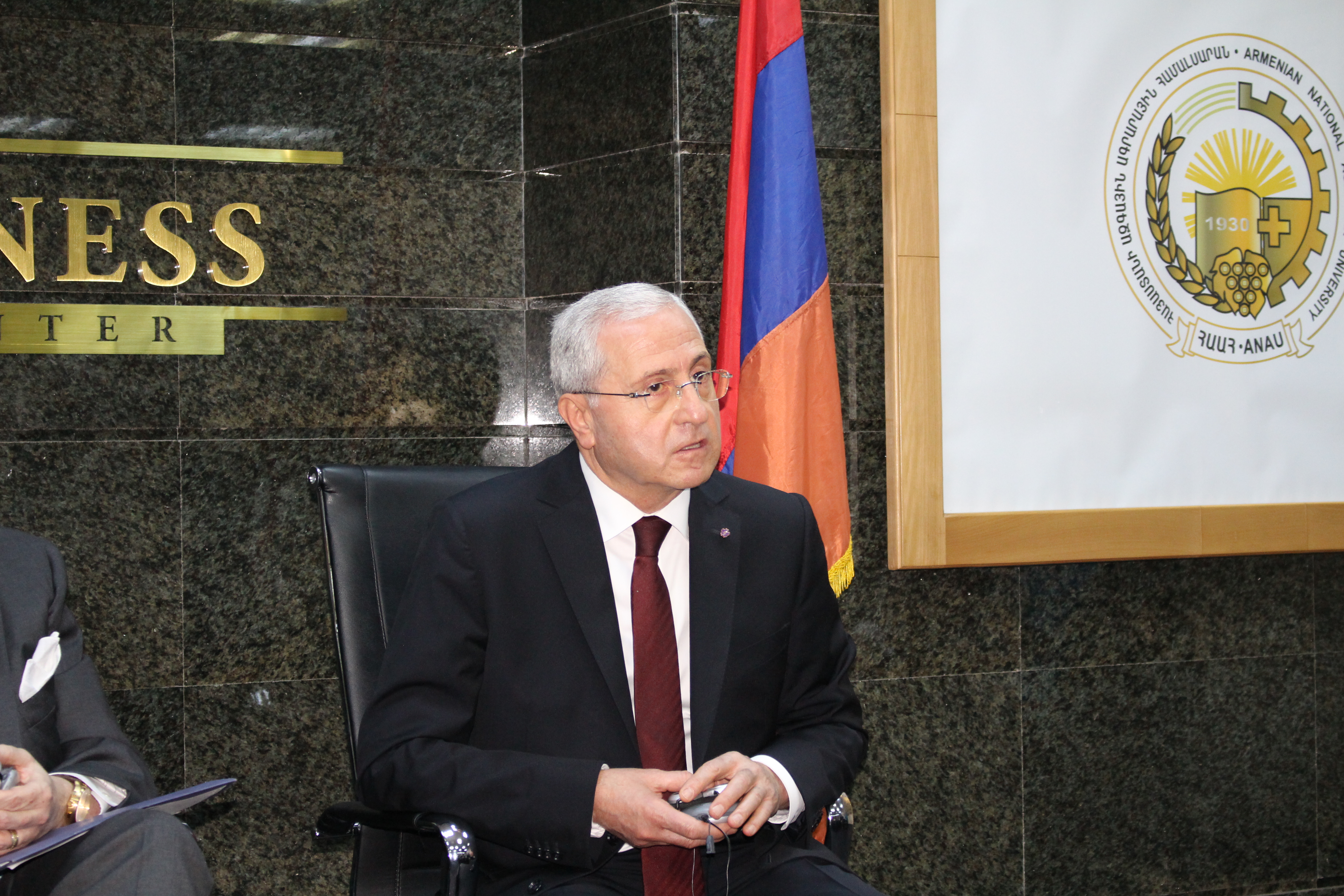

Sergo Karapetyan (Armenian: Սերգո Կարապետյան; 6 August 1948 – 18 February 2021) was an Armenian politician.

== Biography ==
He served as Agriculture Minister between 2010 and 2016. On February 18, 2021, Karapetyan died of complications from COVID-19 at the Nairi Medical Center in Yerevan during the COVID-19 pandemic in Armenia.
