= List of football stadiums in Armenia =

The following is a list of football stadiums in Armenia, ranked in order of capacity, with the minimum capacity being 500.

== Current stadiums ==
#	Image	Stadium	Capacity	City	Province	Home team(s)	Opened	Seats
1		Hrazdan Stadium	54,208	Yerevan	n/a	none	1970	all-seater
2		Vazgen Sargsyan Republican Stadium	14,403	Yerevan	n/a	Armenia national football team, Ararat Yerevan	1935	all-seater
3		Mika Stadium	7,000	Yerevan	n/a	Mika	2008	all-seater
4		Nairi Stadium	6,850	Yerevan	n/a	Alashkert	1960	1,850 seated 5,000 standing
5		Gyumri City Stadium	5,000	Gyumri	Shirak	Shirak	1924	all-seater
6		Charentsavan City Stadium	5,000	Charentsavan	Kotayk	Van	1970	1,000 seated 4,000 standing
7		Urartu Stadium	4,860	Yerevan	n/a	Urartu	2008	all-seater
8		Kasaghi Marzik Stadium	3,600	Ashtarak	Aragatsotn	none	1971	standing
9		Hakob Tonoyan Stadium	3,120	Armavir	Armavir	Sardarapat FC	1980	all-seater
10		Vahagn Tumasyan Stadium	3,100	Abovyan	Kotayk	Noah	1966	all-seater
11		Kapan Stadium	3,000	Kapan	Syunik	Gandzasar Kapan, FC Syunik	1963	all-seater
12		Vanadzor City Stadium	2,450	Vanadzor	Lori	Nikarm Ijevan	1958	all-seater
13		Arnar Stadium	2,000	Ijevan	Tavush	none	2007	all-seater
14		Freedom Arena	1600	Yerevan	n/a	none	2026	all-seater
15		Artashat City Stadium	1,500	Artashat	Ararat	none	1960	all-seater
16		Yerevan Football Academy Stadium	1,428	Yerevan	n/a	Ararat-Armenia, BKMA	2013	all-seater
17		Ayg Stadium	1,280	Ararat	Ararat	none		all-seater
18		Junior Sport Stadium	1,188	Yerevan	n/a	Pyunik	2020	all-seater
19		Arevik Stadium	1,000	Vayk	Vayots Dzor	none	1985	all-seater
20		Sisian City Stadium	500	Sisian	Syunik	none	2017	all-seater
21		Hmayak Khachatryan Stadium	488	Yerevan	n/a	none		all-seater
22		Sevan City Stadium	450	Sevan	Gegharkunik	Andranik Vardenis	2019	all-seater

== Abandoned stadiums ==
#	Image	Stadium	Capacity	City	Province	Home team(s)	Opened	Turf	Seats
1		Artik City Stadium	6,000	Artik	Shirak	none	1975	natural	standing
2		Martuni City Stadium	5,000	Martuni	Gegharkunik	none	1974	natural	standing
3		Nor Hachn City Stadium	5,000	Nor Hachn	Kotayk	none	1972	natural	standing
4		Vardenis City Stadium	4,500	Vardenis	Gegharkunik	none	1972	natural	standing
5		Agarak Stadium	3,000	Agarak	Syunik	none		natural	standing
6		Vachik Ghaltakhchyan Stadium	2,500	Achajur	Tavush	none	2005	natural	standing
7		Lchashen Stadium	2,000	Lchashen	Gegharkunik	none	1975	natural	standing
8		Noyemberyan City Stadium	1,500	Noyemberyan	Tavush	none	2013	natural	standing
9		Dilijan City Stadium	1,200	Dilijan	Tavush	none		natural	standing
10		Maralik City Stadium	1,000	Maralik	Shirak	none		natural	standing
11		Metallurg Stadium	750	Alaverdi	Lori	none	1970	natural	all-seater
12		Yeghegnadzor City Stadium	300	Yeghegnadzor	Vayots Dzor	none		natural	standing
13		Vardanank-451 Stadium	250	Voskehat	Armavir	none	1993	natural	all-seater
14		Parpi Stadium	150	Parpi	Aragatsotn	none		natural	standing

== See also ==
- List of association football stadiums by capacity
- List of association football stadiums by country
- List of sports venues by capacity
- Lists of stadiums
- List of stadiums in Europe
