= Yeprem =

Yeprem, also spelt Yefrem, is an Armenian and Russian masculine given name. It is the Armenian spelling of Ephraim. It may refer to:

- Yeprem Khan (1868–1912), born Yeprem Davidian, Iranian-Armenian revolutionary leader
- Yefrem Mukhin (1766–1850), Russian physician and biologist
- Yeprem Philibosian, Armenian American philanthropist
- Yefrem Sokolov (1926–2022), Belarusian politician
- Yeprem I of Constantinople, Armenian Patriarch of Constantinople from 1684 to 1686; see List of Armenian Patriarchs of Constantinople

== See also ==
- Yepremyan / Yepremian, a surname
