= Varuzhan Yepremyan =

Armenian painter (born 1959)

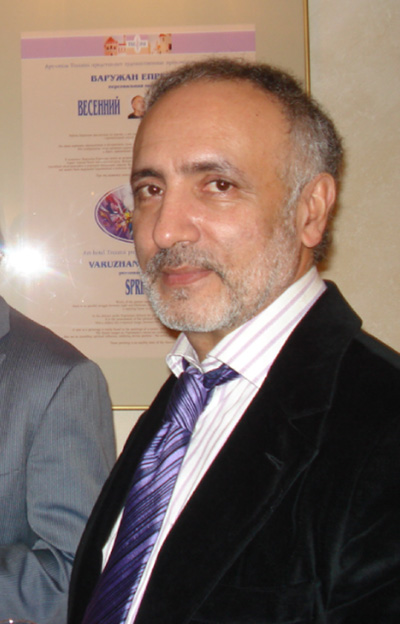
Varuzhan Yepremyan

Varuzhan Yepremyan (Armenian: Վարուժան Եփրեմյան, born 1959 in Artashat, Armenia) is an Armenian painter.

== Biography ==
In 1978 after graduating from the Yerevan Art College by Terlemezyan he continued his once started way in the studio of Yerevan Fine Arts and Theatre Institute (professor - Ara Bekaryan). Varuzhan Yepremyan is a member of the Union of Artists of Armenia, a member of the Creative union of artists of Russia, a member of creative association of artists MIR.

== Exhibitions ==
Personal

- 1981 Yerevan conservatory
- 1992 The Arabian Peninsula (Sharjah)
- 1994 Westeros (Sweden)
- 1999 the "Blue living-room" gallery (Saint-Petersburg)
- 2000 Perm, gallery of petroleum company
- 2001 the "Blue living-room" gallery (Saint-Petersburg)
- 2002 INKAS-bank (Saint-Petersburg)
- 2002 Bank Saint-Petersburg
- 2003 Mansion of Neytgard (Saint-Petersburg)
- 2004 the "Blue living-room" gallery (Saint-Petersburg)
- 2005 Yusupov palace (Saint-Petersburg)
- 2005 "Mansard of artists" gallery (Saint-Petersburg)
- 2006 the "Blue living-room" gallery Saint-Petersburg)
- 2006 House of scientists (Saint-Petersburg)
- 2007 Maria palace (Saint-Petersburg)
- 2007 "Gallery at the Bastion "(Pskov)
- 2008 Gallery "E" (St. Petersburg)
- 2008 The Council of Federation (Moscow)
- 2009 Gallery of Art-Hotel "Trezzini"
- 2009 Museum of Art and Industry Academy AM Stieglitz
- 2010 ART-HALL AS Monaco FC
- 2011 The city museum of sculpture of St. Petersburg

Group

- 1999 Bienaile (Saint-Petersburg)
- 2000 Berlin, Russian house
- 2000 Moscow, CDX
- 2001 Munich
- 2001 Moscow, CDX (a 1700-year of adopting Christianity in Armenia)
- 2002 in embassy of Armenia in Russia (Moscow)
- 2003 St-petersburg's painters in "Palette" gallery (Saint-Petersburg)
- 2003 the modern artists of Saint-Petersburg in the department of UNO (Sweden)
- 2004 ART-Ext (New-York)
- 2005 counsel of exhibition the "Armenian painters in Petersburg" (building of the Saint-Petersburg conservatory)
- 2010 Cadet Corps Manege (France - Russia) (Saint-Petersburg)
- 2010 Museum of City Sculpture "Rojdestvo" (Saint-Petersburg)
