= Artashat City Stadium =

Coordinates: 39°57′20″N 44°32′39″E

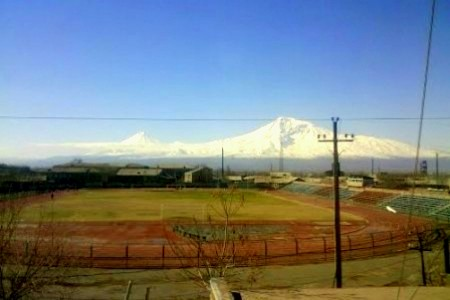
- Interactive map of Artashat City Stadium
- Full name: Artashat City Stadium
- Location: Artashat, Armenia
- Owner: Artashat Town Council
- Capacity: 4,500
- Surface: grass
- Field size: 110 x 70 meters

Construction
- Opened: 1960

Tenants
- Dvin Artashat (1982-1999); Armenian Athletics Federation

Artashat City Stadium (Armenian: Արտաշատի քաղաքային մարզադաշտ) is a multipurpose stadium in Artashat, Armenia, mostly used for football matches as well as for domestic events of Athletics.

== Overview ==
Artashat City Stadium was opened in 1960 and currently has a capacity of 4,500 spectators. It served as a home ground to FC Dvin Artashat between 1982 and 1999, when the club was dissolved and retired from professional football.

The stadium is currently used for youth football schools in the Ararat Province.

It is the regular home of the annual Robert Emmiyan Trophy of the National Athletics Championship of Armenia.
