= Tsaghkadzor ski resort =

Ski resort in Tsaghkadzor, Armenia

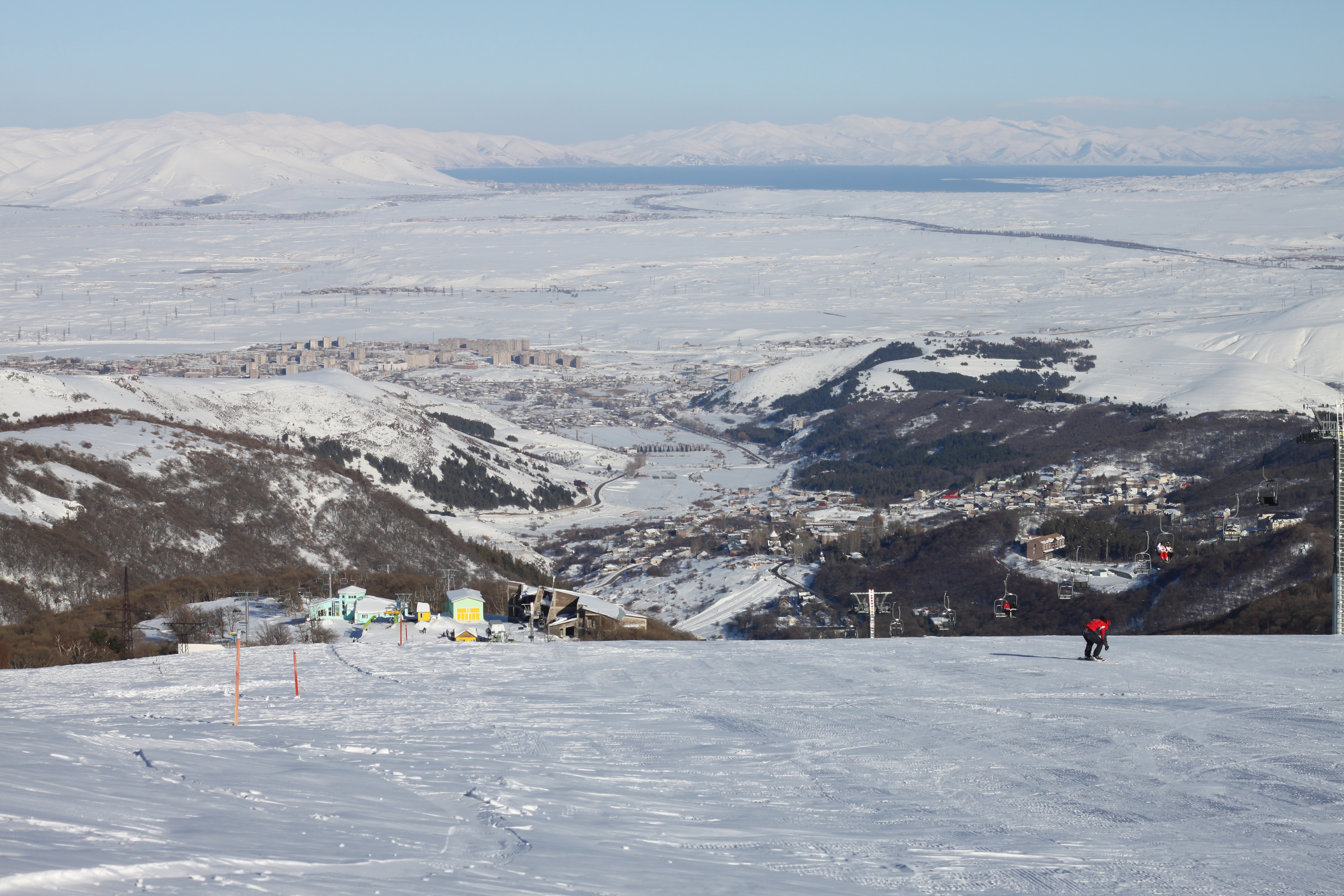

- Location within Armenia
- Location: Tsaghkadzor, Armenia
- Nearest city: Yerevan, Armenia 55 km (34 mi)
- Coordinates: 40°32′04″N 44°41′30″E
- Vertical: 854 m (2,802 ft)
- Top elevation: 2,820 m (9,250 ft)
- Base elevation: 1,966 m (6,450 ft)
- Trails: 16 total
- Longest run: 5.8 km (3.6 mi)
- Lift system: 5 total 1 detachable quads 4 double chair
- Website: WinterArmenia.com

Tsaghkadzor Ski Resort, is a sports and tourists facilities located just above the Armenian town of Tsaghkadzor of Kotayk Province, approximately 60 km north east of the capital Yerevan and the Zvartnots International Airport. It was opened in 1986 adjacent to the Tsaghkadzor Olympic Sports Complex.

== Tsaghkadzor facts and history ==
The town of Tsaghkadzor is located at 1,750 m above sea level on the southeast slope of mount Teghenis. During the Soviet times, the lifts and other sporting facilities were built to prepare Soviet athletes for the 1988 Winter Olympics. The town was further developed into a ski resort and later fully modernized with the old lifts being replaced. In addition to the ski resort, the town is also known for the Kecharis Monastery.

== The lifts ==
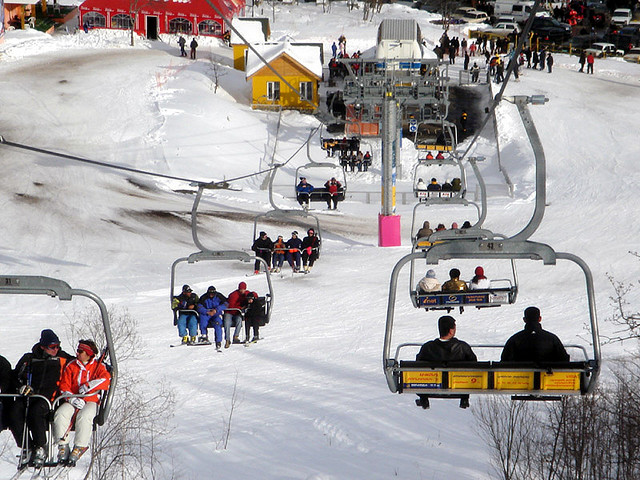
A view of the ski lifts

All lifts are manufactured and operated by Leitner Group. The current structure replaced existing soviet era lifts, mostly following their path. There were initially three consecutive lifts stretching from the foot of the mountain (1,969 m above sea level) up till the mountain peak (2,819 m), with the first and second lifts ending at 2,234 m and 2,465 m above sea level respectively. In 2006, a fourth lift was added, stretching from the end of the first stage towards an opposite hilltop, thus adding two trails, both leading down to the foot of the slopes.

The first stage of the lifts is a four-seater and all the others are double seater chairlifts equipped with magic carpet boarding systems.

== Infrastructure and services ==
Apart from the lifts the resort offers ski and snowboard rental as well as skiing instructors.

There are three cafés located at the foot of the mount and at the end of the first and second lifts.

== Skiing season ==
The skiing season in Tsaghkadzor normally starts in mid-December and stretches well into March with the top slopes often fit for skiing in April.

== Gallery ==
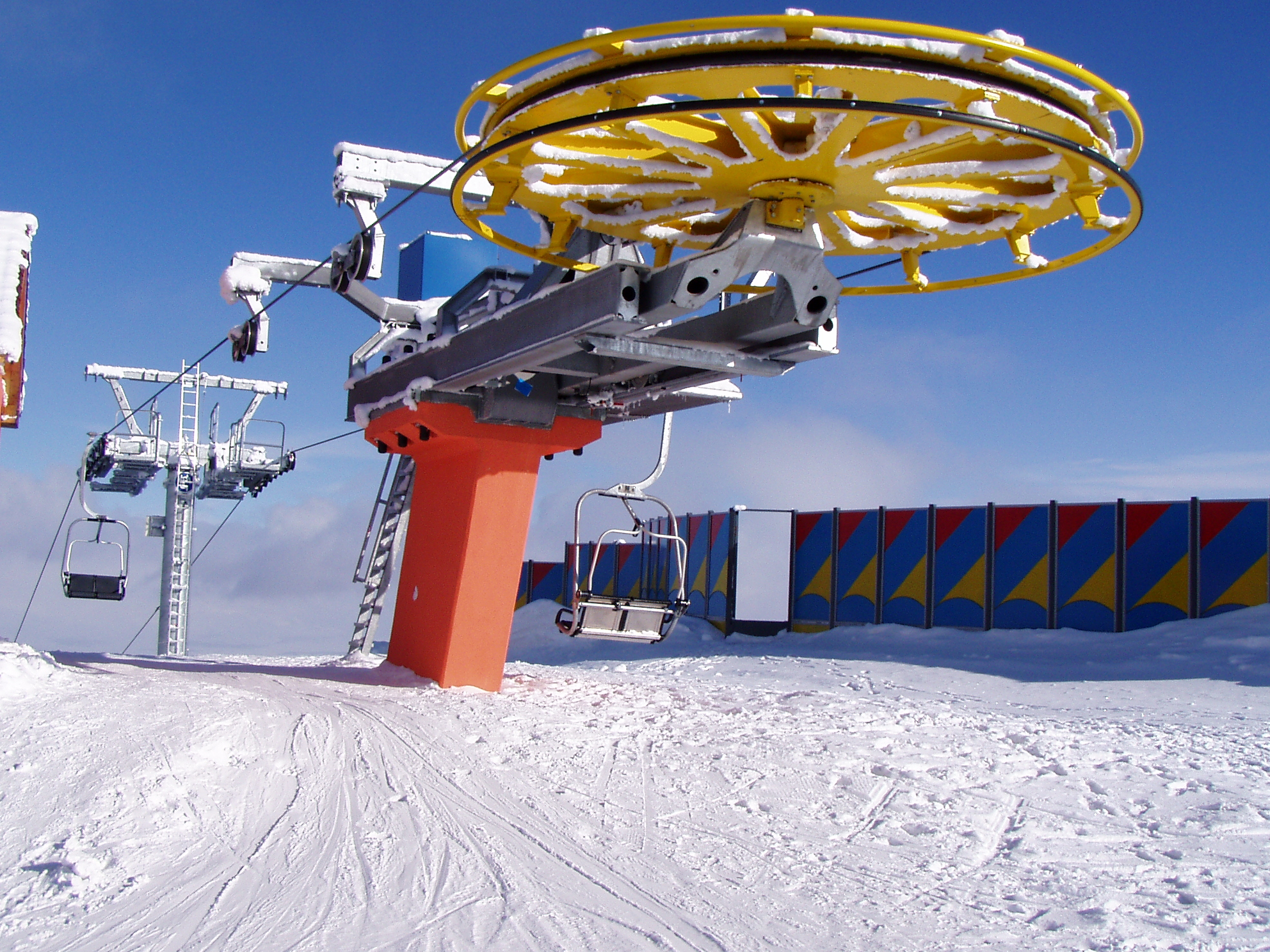
The highest ski lift on Mount Teghenis (2819 m.)

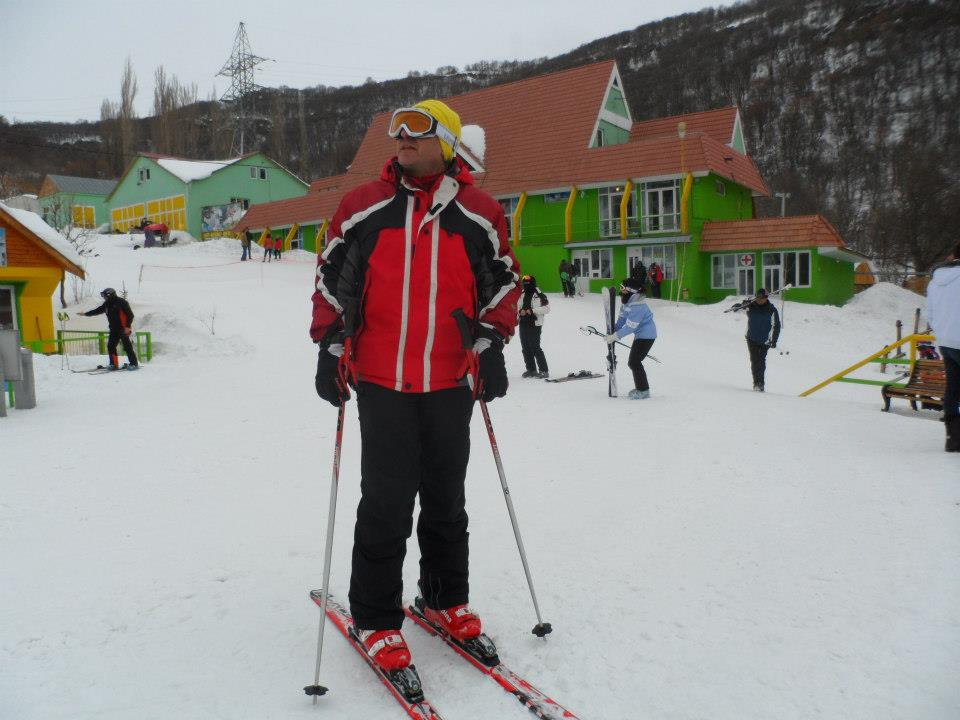
A skier in Tsaghkadzor

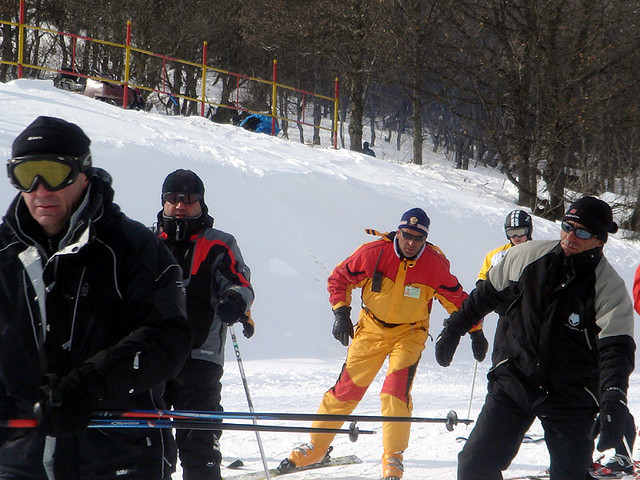
Skier in Tsaghkadzor

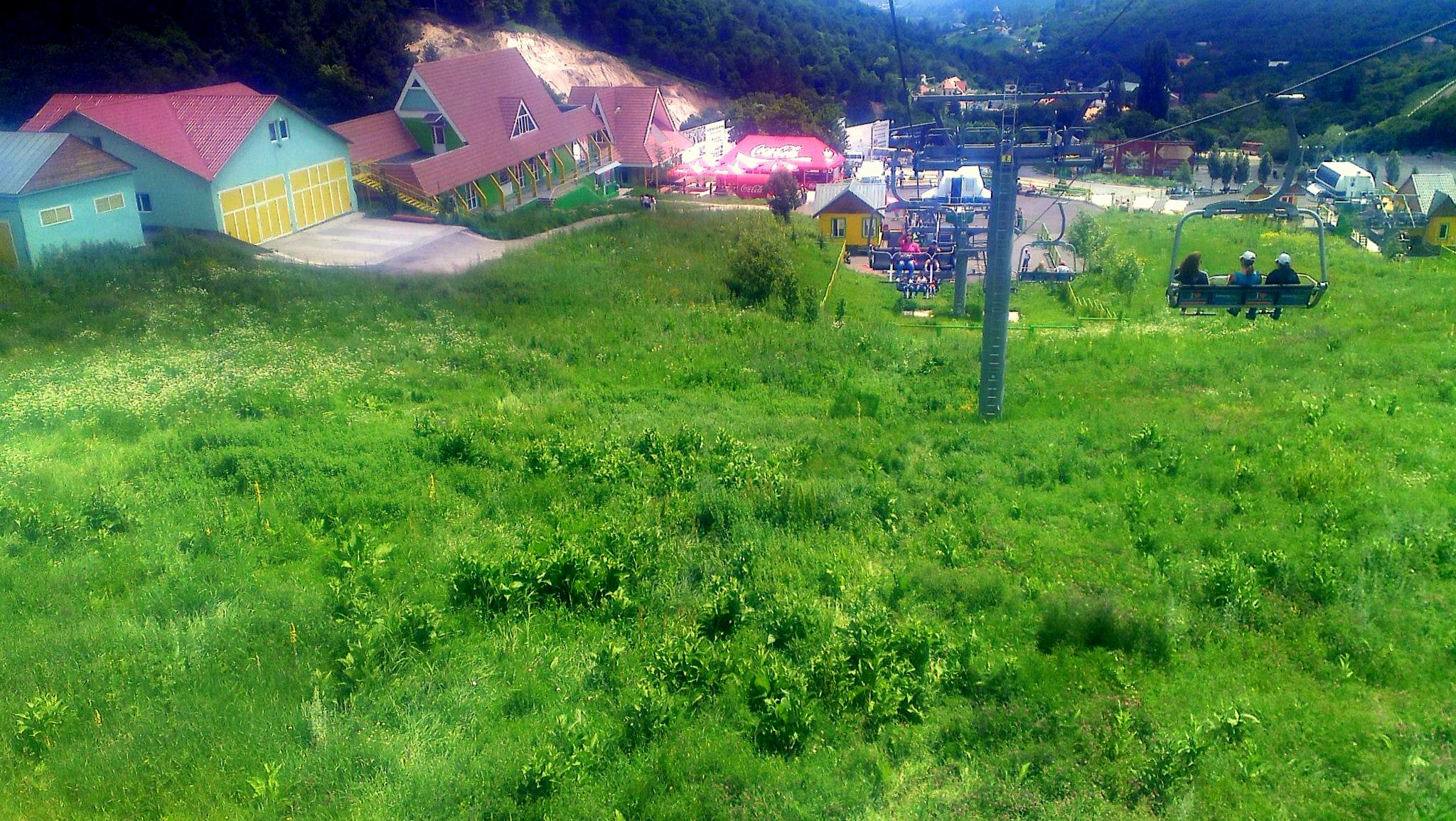
The ski lift at spring time

== See also ==
- Armenian Ski Federation
- List of ski areas and resorts in Asia
- List of ski areas and resorts in Europe
