= Tsaghkadzor Olympic Sports Complex =

Sports complex in Kotayk, Armenia

Coordinates: 40°31′30″N 44°42′40″E

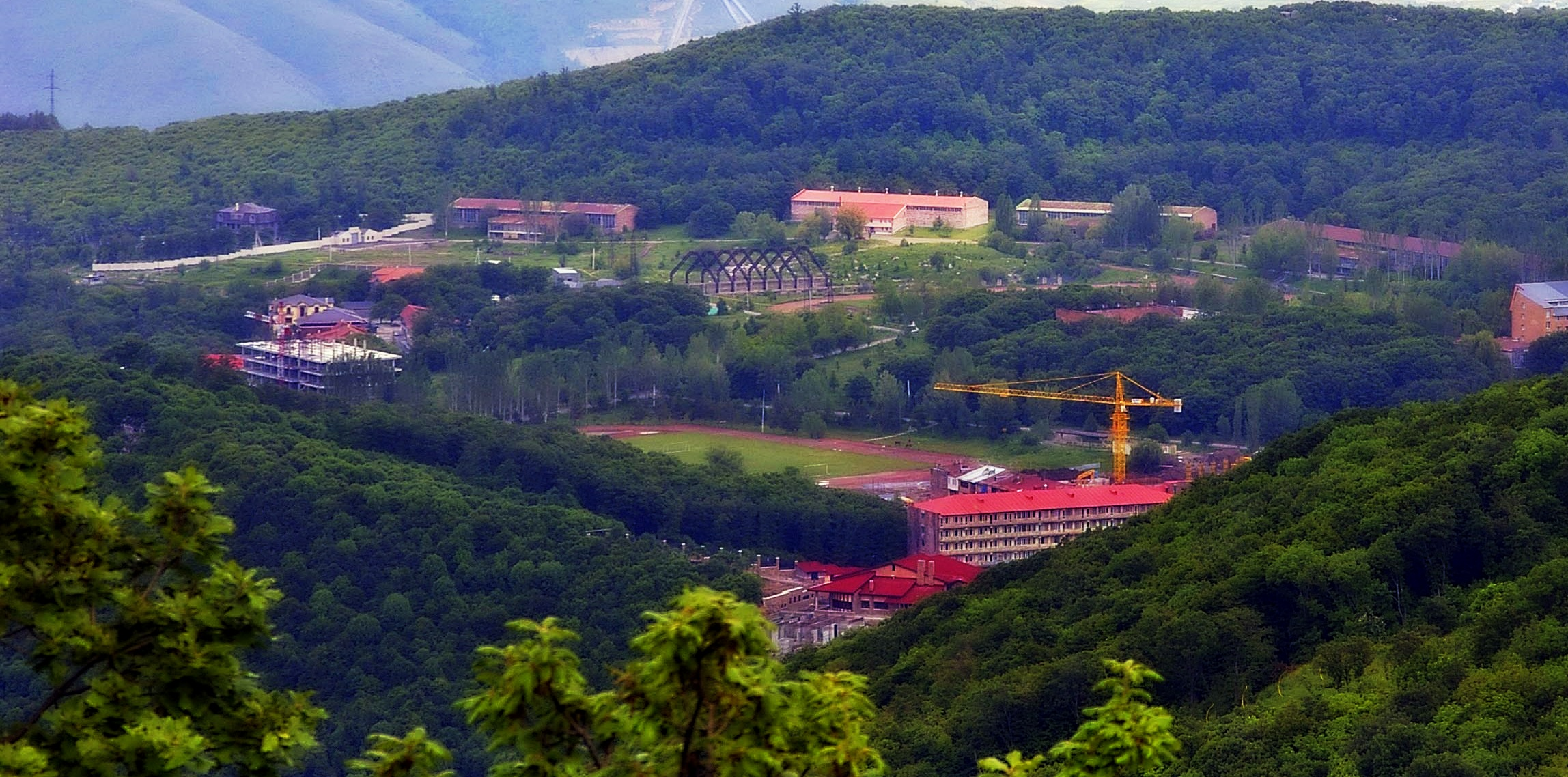
General view of the complex

Tsaghkadzor Olympic Sports Complex (Armenian: Ծաղկաձորի Օլիմպիական Մարզահամալիր), is a multi-sport training complex in the mountain resort town of Tsaghkadzor, Kotayk Province, Armenia. It was opened in 1967 a state-owned sports complex of the Armenian Soviet Socialist Republic. It was entirely renovated between 2007 and 2008 with an estimated cost of US$ 8 million.

== History ==
The Tsaghkadzor Sports Complex was opened in 1967 during the Soviet days, through the efforts of the Soviet-Armenian gymnast and Olympic gold medalist Hrant Shahinyan. The complex was specifically designed and built to become the main venue to host the training campaign of the Soviet athletes for the 1968 Summer Olympics in Mexico City. In 1986, the Tsaghkadzor ski resort was opened near the complex.

On 22 May 1987 Soviet athlete Robert Emmiyan jumped here 8,86m, which was registered second longest jump ever that time.

Entirely renovated in 2007, the Tsaghkadzor Olympic Complex is considered one of the most developed training facilities in Transcaucasia. It provides training areas for 35 types of sports including 2 regular-sized football pitches with athletics track, indoor sports hall, indoor swimming pool, diving pool, skiing and snowboarding tracks, fitness halls, modern hotel and sanatorium along with many other facilities. The centre is also home to a large training hall for individual Olympic sports including wrestling, judo, weightlifting, etc. The complex hosts the annual competition of the "Best Sport Family" held every year during summer.

The nearby ski resort is the centre of winter sports in Armenia. The skiing season in Tsaghkadzor normally starts in mid-December and stretches well into March with the top slopes often fit for skiing in April.
