= Artashat, Armenia =

City in Ararat, Armenia

Artashat Արտաշատ
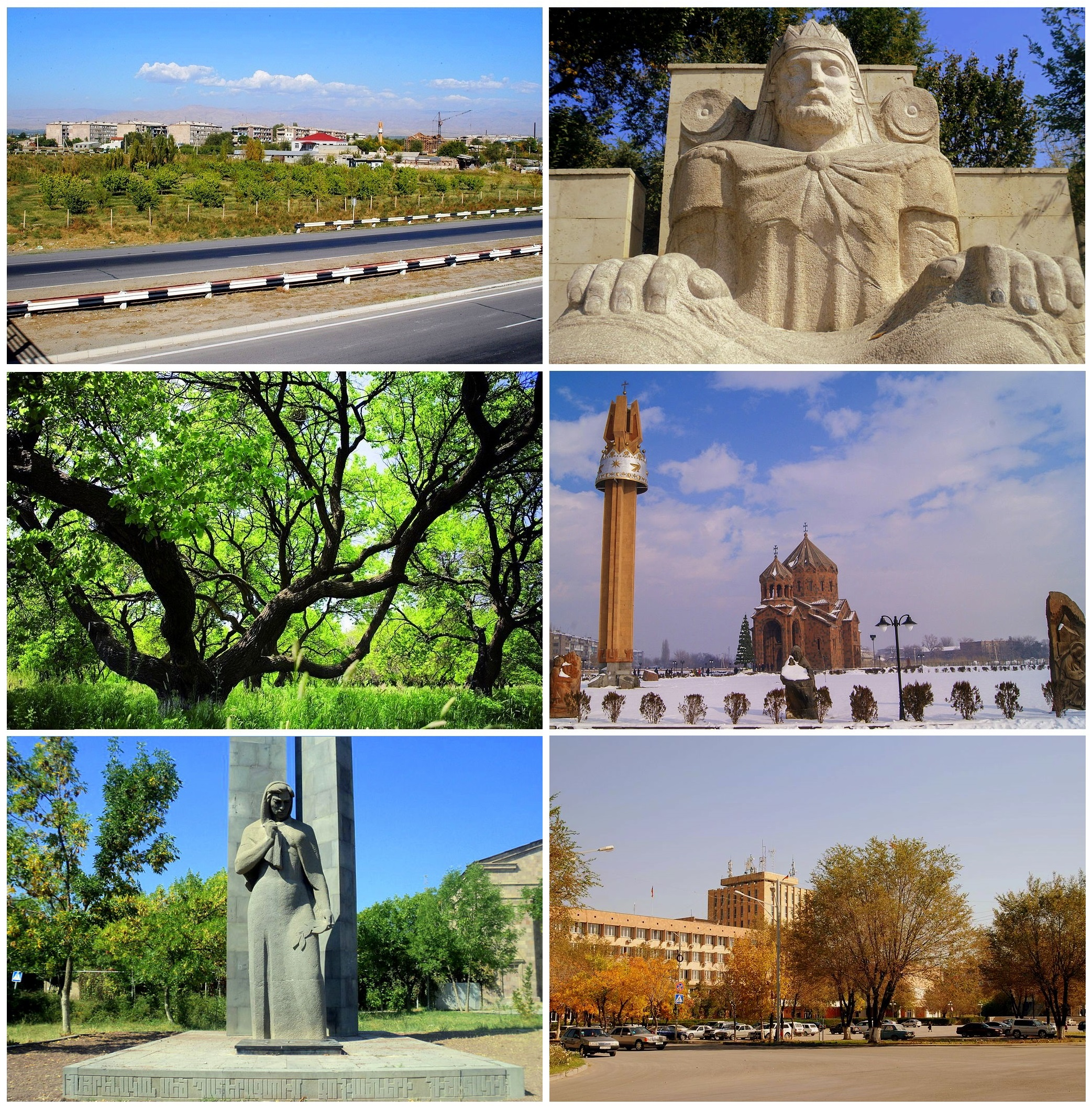
- From top left: View of Artashat • Statue of King Artaxias I Apricot farms • Surp Hovhannes Church; World War II memorial • Downtown Artashat

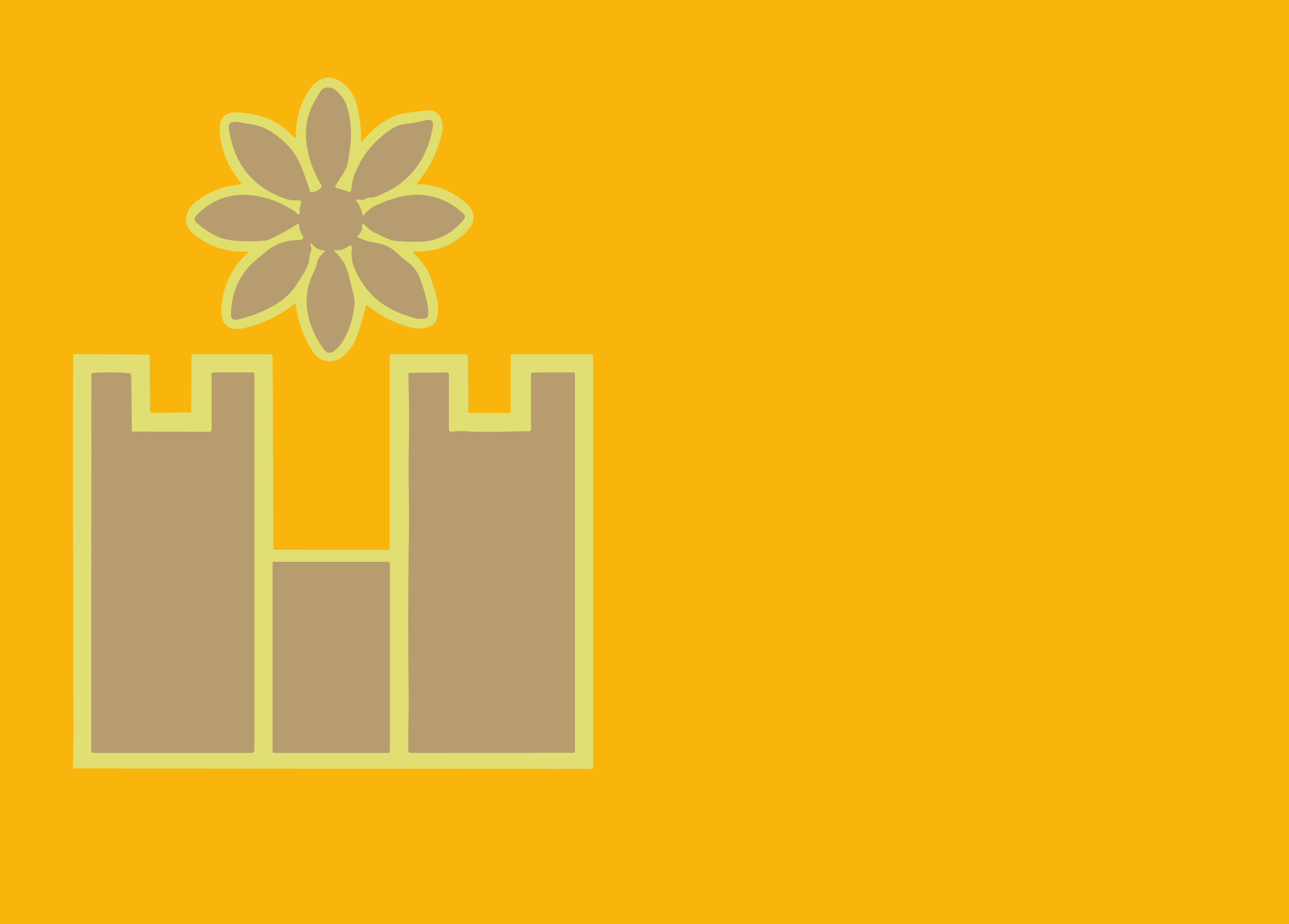
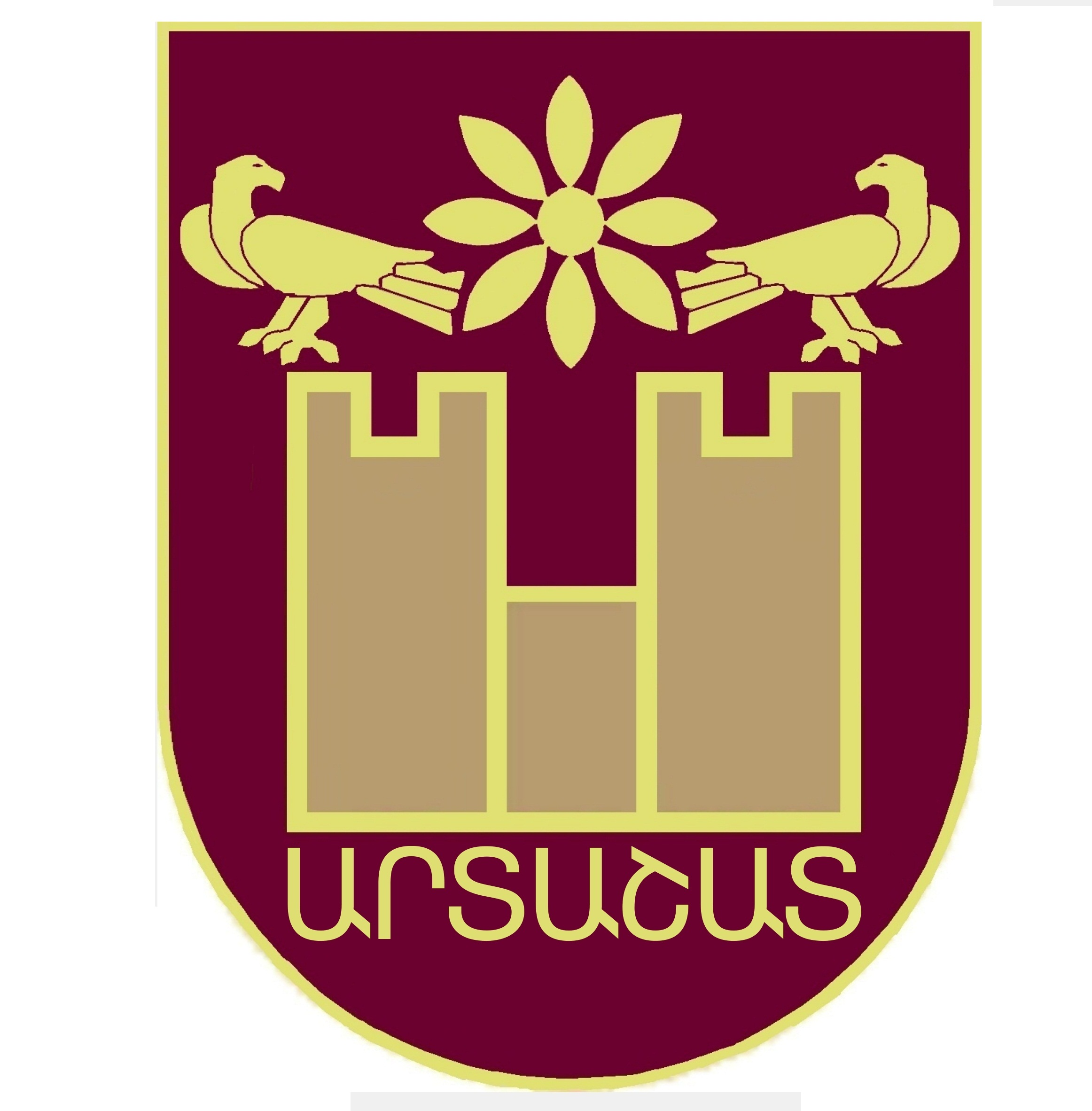
- Flag Coat of arms

- Location within Armenia Location within Ararat
- Coordinates: 39°57′14″N 44°33′02″E
- Country: Armenia
- Province: Ararat
- Municipality: Artashat
- First settled: 1828–29
- Received urban-type settlement status: 1946
- Received city status: 1962

Area
  - Total: 18.3 km^{2} (7.1 sq mi)
- Elevation: 830 m (2,720 ft)

Population (2022 census)
  - Total: 19,020
  - Density: 1,040/km^{2} (2,690/sq mi)
- Time zone: UTC+4 (AMT)
- ZIP: 0701-0706
- Area code: +374 (235)
- Vehicle registration: 25
- Website: Municipality official website

Artashat (Armenian: Արտաշատ [ɑɾtɑˈʃɑt]) is a city in Armenia, the administrative centre of the Ararat Province. It is located in the central part of the Ararat Plain, on the left bank of the Araks River, 30 km southeast of the capital Yerevan.

The city got its name from the settlement founded in 176 BC by King Artashes I, which served as the capital of Greater Armenia for almost four centuries, for which it received the nickname "Armenian Carthage" in ancient historiography. The current city is located 5 km northwest of historical Artashat.

== Name ==
Modern Artashat is named after the ancient city of Artashat (also known as Artaxata), the ruins of which are located around 8 km southeast of the modern city. Ancient Artashat served as the capital of the Greater Armenia for nearly 350 years, with some interruptions, after its founding in 176 BC. It was named after its founder King Artashes I, the founder of the Artaxiad dynasty. The name of the city is derived from Iranian languages. It can be interpreted as meaning "the joy of Arta (truth)," although it is actually a shortening of Artaxšas-šāt, meaning 'the joy of Artashes.' Old Artashat was also known as Ostan Hayots’, meaning 'court/seat of the Armenians,' which was also the name of the canton in which it was located.

== History ==
=== Ancient Artashat ===
According to ancient authors (Strabo and Plutarch), the city was founded around 176 BC. The choice of location in the Ararat Valley, at the confluence of the Araks and Metsamor (Sevjur) rivers, was dictated by strategic considerations: the city was located at the intersection of trade routes and was protected by riverbeds and surrounding hills.

Tradition attributes the design of the city's fortifications to the Carthaginian general Hannibal, who found refuge at the court of the Armenian king after Carthage's defeat in the war with Rome. Thanks to his participation in the planning, Artashat received the epithet “Armenian Carthage” in ancient sources.

During the reign of Tigranes the Great (95–55 BCE), Artashat remained the most important center of the country even after the construction of the new capital, Tigranakert. The city became a center of Hellenistic culture in the region. In 53 BCE, Euripides' tragedy "The Bacchae" was staged in the city theater to commemorate the victory over the Romans at the Battle of Carrhae, marking the beginning of professional Armenian theater.

In 58 CE, the city was captured and burned by the Roman general Corbulo during the war for the Armenian throne. The city was later rebuilt with the support of Emperor Nero, who provided funds to King Trdat I, and was temporarily renamed Neronia.

By the 4th century CE, the city began to lose its importance due to the shifting course of the Araks River and the swamping of the area. The final blow to the capital came with the Persian invasion led by Shapur II in the 360s, when the city's population was deported. The country's administrative center was subsequently moved to nearby Dvin.

=== Modern Artashat ===
The modern period of Artashat's history began in the first half of the 20th century. Unlike the ancient capital, which was located directly on the hills of Khor Virap, the modern settlement developed several kilometers to the northwest.

Until 1945, the site of the modern city was occupied by the village of Verkhniy Kamarlu. In September 1945, by decree of the Presidium of the Supreme Soviet of the Armenian SSR, the settlement was renamed Artashat. In 1962, during the administrative-territorial reform and rapid industrial growth, the village received the status of a city of republican subordination.

The city's development during the Soviet years was determined by the master plans of 1948 and 1968 (architects O. Kasabyan and G. Muradyan). Artashat was designed as an industrial center for the Ararat Plain. The main emphasis was on the processing industry: the republic's largest wine and cognac factory, a canning factory, a cotton gin, and a furniture factory were built here. During this period, the main architectural ensembles of the central streets were laid out and social infrastructure was formed: schools, libraries and medical institutions.

Following Armenia's independence in 1991, Artashat faced economic challenges typical of the post-Soviet space, leading to the temporary closure of large enterprises and an outflow of the population. However, in 1995, the city received a new status, becoming the administrative center of the newly formed Ararat Province, which stimulated the development of the public services sector.

In the 2000s, economic recovery began thanks to private investment in the agro-industrial complex. The city has secured its status as a key center for winemaking and production of canned fruits and vegetables in Armenia.

== Geography ==
Artashat is located in the central part of the Ararat Plain at an altitude of approximately 820–850 meters above sea level. The city occupies a flat area on the left bank of the Araks River, which in this region serves as the state border between Armenia and Turkey. The modern city center is located approximately 4 km northeast of the historic confluence of the Araks and the Metsamor (Sevjur) Rivers. The predominantly flat terrain of the area leads to intensive agricultural development of the surrounding lands. The city offers panoramic views of the Greater and Lesser Ararat massif, located less than 30 km to the southwest.

=== Climate ===
The city's climate is characterized as sharply continental and arid: summers are long and hot, with average temperatures in July and August ranging from 20 to 26°C (with highs reaching 42°C), while winters are moderately cold, with average January temperatures around -6°C. Annual precipitation is minimal for the region, amounting to 200–235 mm, making local agriculture entirely dependent on irrigation systems.

Climate data for Artashat (1991-2020, extremes 1981-2020)
Month	Jan	Feb	Mar	Apr	May	Jun	Jul	Aug	Sep	Oct	Nov	Dec	Year
Record high °C (°F)	15.6 (60.1)	20.5 (68.9)	27.9 (82.2)	33.7 (92.7)	35.1 (95.2)	39.3 (102.7)	42.3 (108.1)	41.4 (106.5)	39.3 (102.7)	32.0 (89.6)	25.1 (77.2)	22.1 (71.8)	42.3 (108.1)
Daily mean °C (°F)	−2.8 (27.0)	0.7 (33.3)	7.3 (45.1)	13.2 (55.8)	17.8 (64.0)	22.7 (72.9)	26.2 (79.2)	25.9 (78.6)	20.7 (69.3)	13.9 (57.0)	6.0 (42.8)	−0.3 (31.5)	12.6 (54.7)
Record low °C (°F)	−25.9 (−14.6)	−23.4 (−10.1)	−22.7 (−8.9)	−8.0 (17.6)	2.0 (35.6)	6.6 (43.9)	9.2 (48.6)	8.9 (48.0)	2.9 (37.2)	−2.0 (28.4)	−10.6 (12.9)	−27.3 (−17.1)	−27.3 (−17.1)
Average precipitation mm (inches)	17.1 (0.67)	18.8 (0.74)	23.9 (0.94)	43.6 (1.72)	37.9 (1.49)	21.8 (0.86)	10.5 (0.41)	5.8 (0.23)	9.1 (0.36)	18.0 (0.71)	22.3 (0.88)	16.2 (0.64)	245 (9.65)
Average precipitation days (≥ 1 mm)	3.7	3.8	4.5	7.1	6.9	4	2.3	1.3	2	3.9	4.1	4.1	47.7
Average relative humidity (%)	78.1	72.3	62	60.5	61.6	55.6	53.3	53.6	58	68	73.9	79.1	64.7
Mean monthly sunshine hours	64.5	89.1	150.9	156.1	227.7	297.3	334.4	301.4	262.7	188.9	117.2	74.4	2,264.6
Source: NOAA, (Sun for 1981-2010)

== Demographics ==
According to official data and estimates as of early 2025, the city's population is approximately 19,100–20,500. The population peaked in the late 1980s (over 32,000 people), but socioeconomic changes in the 1990s and migration led to a significant decline. In recent years, the rate of population decline has slowed due to the development of the agricultural sector and the city's proximity to the Yerevan metropolitan area.

Artashat's population is highly ethnically homogeneous. The overwhelming majority of residents (over 98%) are Armenian. The city is also home to members of the Yazidi and Russian communities.

The population's age and gender distribution shows a slight predominance of women (approximately 53%). The average age of the city's residents is 34. A rise in commuting is being recorded: a significant portion of the working-age population commutes daily to work in Yerevan, while maintaining permanent residence in Artashat. The literacy rate of the population is close to 100%.

The population of Artashat since 1945 is as follows:

Year	Population
1945	4,200
1959	7,277
1974	14,905
1976	16,774
1989	32,000
2001	22,600
2011	22,269
2016	18,700
2022	19,020

== Culture ==
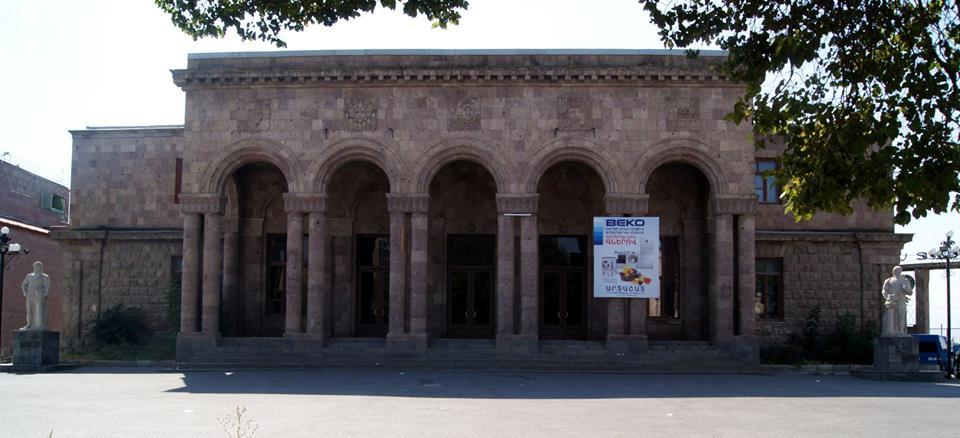
Amo Kharazyan Theatre

Artashat's cultural identity is inextricably linked to its historical status as the "cradle of Armenian theater," where the country's first theatrical production took place in 53 BC, a tradition continued today by the Amo Kharazyan State Drama Theater.

The city's modern cultural infrastructure is represented by a developed network of educational institutions, including the Alexander Adzhemyan Music School and art studios, as well as the central Palace of Culture, which is a venue for regional wine and folk art festivals. The spiritual and architectural dominant of the city is the Church of St. John the Evangelist, consecrated in 2015.

== Transportation ==
Artashat's transportation infrastructure is strategically important, as the city is a key logistics hub on the M2 international highway, linking Yerevan with the southern regions of Armenia and the border of Iran. The South Caucasus Railway line passes through the city, providing regular commuter service between Yerevan and Yeraskh, while a well-developed network of regional highways (such as the H8) connects the administrative center with adjacent agricultural communities and tourist attractions, including the Khor Virap Monastery. Passenger transportation is provided primarily by private and public bus routes, as well as minibuses, integrating Artashat into the capital's transportation system. The city also maintains its status as a key hub in the implementation of the international north–south transport corridor.

== Economy ==
Artashat's economy is based on a developed agro-industrial cluster and its status as a key administrative and commercial center in the Ararat Plain. The industrial sector is anchored by the food industry, represented by large enterprises processing fruit and vegetable products, producing canned goods (Artfood brand), juices, and dairy products, as well as a historically significant wine sector, including both large factories (Artashat Vincon) and developing export-oriented wineries (Tushpa).

The region's favorable climate provides a raw material base for the city's enterprises, and investments in recent years have focused on modernizing production lines and implementing solar energy technologies, strengthening Artashat's position as one of Armenia's most economically stable regional centers.

== Education ==
The Artashat education system is a vast network of state and extracurricular institutions. The core of secondary education is formed by comprehensive and high schools, some of which have implemented advanced Armat engineering laboratories. Professional training for the regional economy is provided at Artashat State College, which specializes in agricultural technology, service, and economics. The city's supplementary education is represented by the Alexander Adzhemyan Music School and the Art School.

== Sport ==
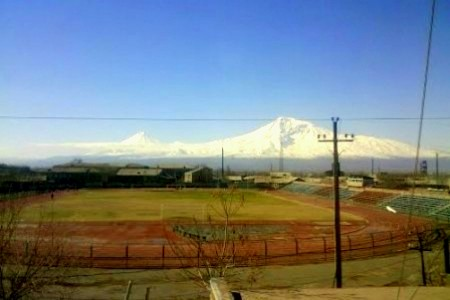
Artashat City Stadium

The city's main sports facility is the Artashat City Stadium, which regularly hosts Armenian track and field championships and international tournaments, including memorials to outstanding athletes. The stadium is certified to host high-level competitions and serves as a training base for the national team. The city also boasts a comprehensive youth sports school, offering training in wrestling (freestyle and Greco-Roman), judo, boxing, and football. Particular attention is paid to developing a football culture: local youth teams actively participate in Armenian championships, and the city's infrastructure is used to host regional stages of national tournaments.

== Twin towns – sister cities ==
Artashat is twinned with:

- Clamart, France (2003)
- Pestszentlőrinc-Pestszentimre (Budapest), Hungary (2003)

== Notable people ==
- Sergo Karapetyan, politician and former minister of agriculture
- Varuzhan Yepremyan, painter
- Gegham Kadimyan, footballer
- Arayik Gevorgyan, wrestler
- Anna M. Sargsyan, chess player
- Gilbert Pogosyan, retired professional footballer
- Hrachya Margaryan, Armenian wrestler, member of the Armenian freestyle wrestling team European youth champion, master of sports international․

== See also ==
- Verin Artashat
