= Tsaghkadzor =

Town in Kotayk, Armenia

Tsaghkadzor Ծաղկաձոր
- Town
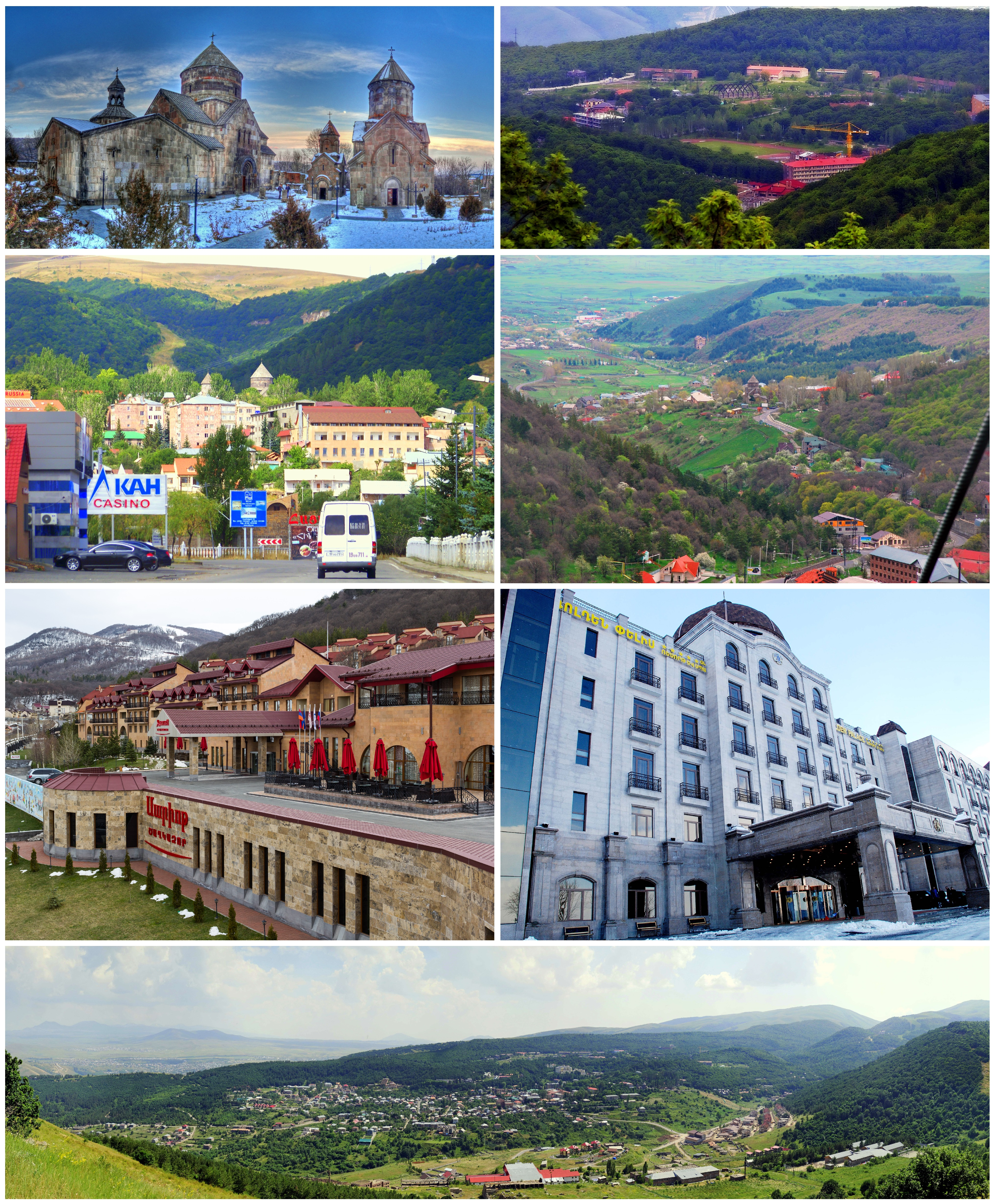
- From top, left to right: Kecharis Monastery • Tsaghkadzor Olympic Complex; Downtown Tsaghkadzor • Tsaghkadzor skyline Mariott Tsaghkadzor • Eighty Eight Hotel; Tsaghkadzor with Tsaghkunyats Mountains

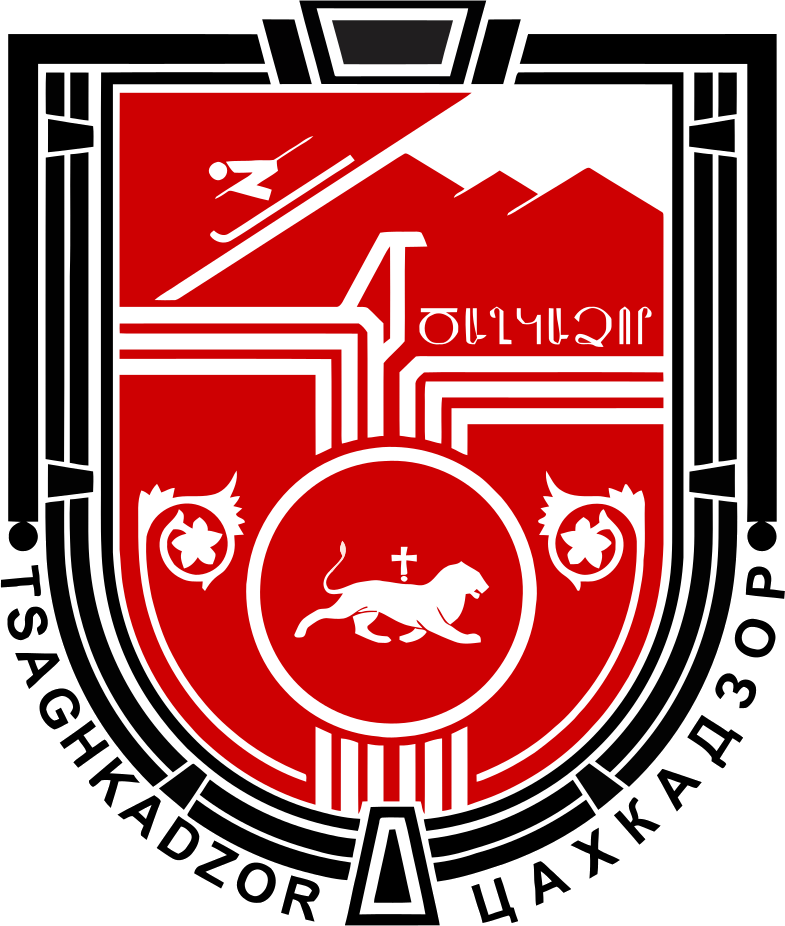
- Coat of arms

- Location in Armenia
- Coordinates: 40°32′02″N 44°43′13″E
- Country: Armenia
- Province: Kotayk
- First mentioned: 3rd century

Government
  - Mayor: Artur Harutyunyan

Area
  - Total: 4 km^{2} (1.5 sq mi)
- Elevation: 1,841 m (6,040 ft)

Population (2022)
  - Total: 1,010
  - Density: 250/km^{2} (650/sq mi)
- Website: Official website Tsaghkadzor tourism website

Tsaghkadzor (Armenian: Ծաղկաձոր, Armenian pronunciation: [t͡sɑχkɑˈd͡zoɾ]) is a resort town and urban municipal community in the Kotayk Province of Armenia. It is a popular ski and health resort and one of Armenia's most important tourist destinations. It is situated on the eastern side of Mount Teghenis, 5 kilometres (3.1 mi) northwest of the provincial capital Hrazdan and 58 kilometres (36 mi) northeast of the capital Yerevan.

In antiquity, Tsaghkadzor served as a summer residence for the Arsacid kings of Armenia. It became a notable monastic center after 1033 with the founding of Kecharis Monastery, which stands to this day. Under Soviet rule, Tsaghkadzor was developed into a major resort town.

As of the 2022 census, the town had a population of 1,010, down from the population of 1,256 reported in the 2011 census.

== Etymology ==
Tsaghkadzor literally means 'valley of flowers' or 'flower canyon' in Armenian. The name of Tsaghkadzor is taken from the name of the nearby Tsaghkunyats Mountains, located to the west of the town. Originally, it was known as Tsaghkotsadzor, and was later called Tsaghkunyats Dzor (Ծաղկունեաց ձոր), which have the same meaning as Tsaghkadzor. In medieval times, the settlement was also known as Kecharuyk (Կեչառոյք) or Kecharis (Կեչառիս), after the Kecharis Monastery built there during the 11–13th centuries. Later, from the 16th century, the settlement was known as Darachichak, which is a translation of Tsaghkadzor into Turkic. In 1947, it was renamed Tsaghkadzor.

== History ==
=== Ancient history and Middle Ages ===
Historically, the territory of modern-day Tsaghkadzor was a part of the Varazhnunik canton of the Ayrarat province of Ancient Armenia.

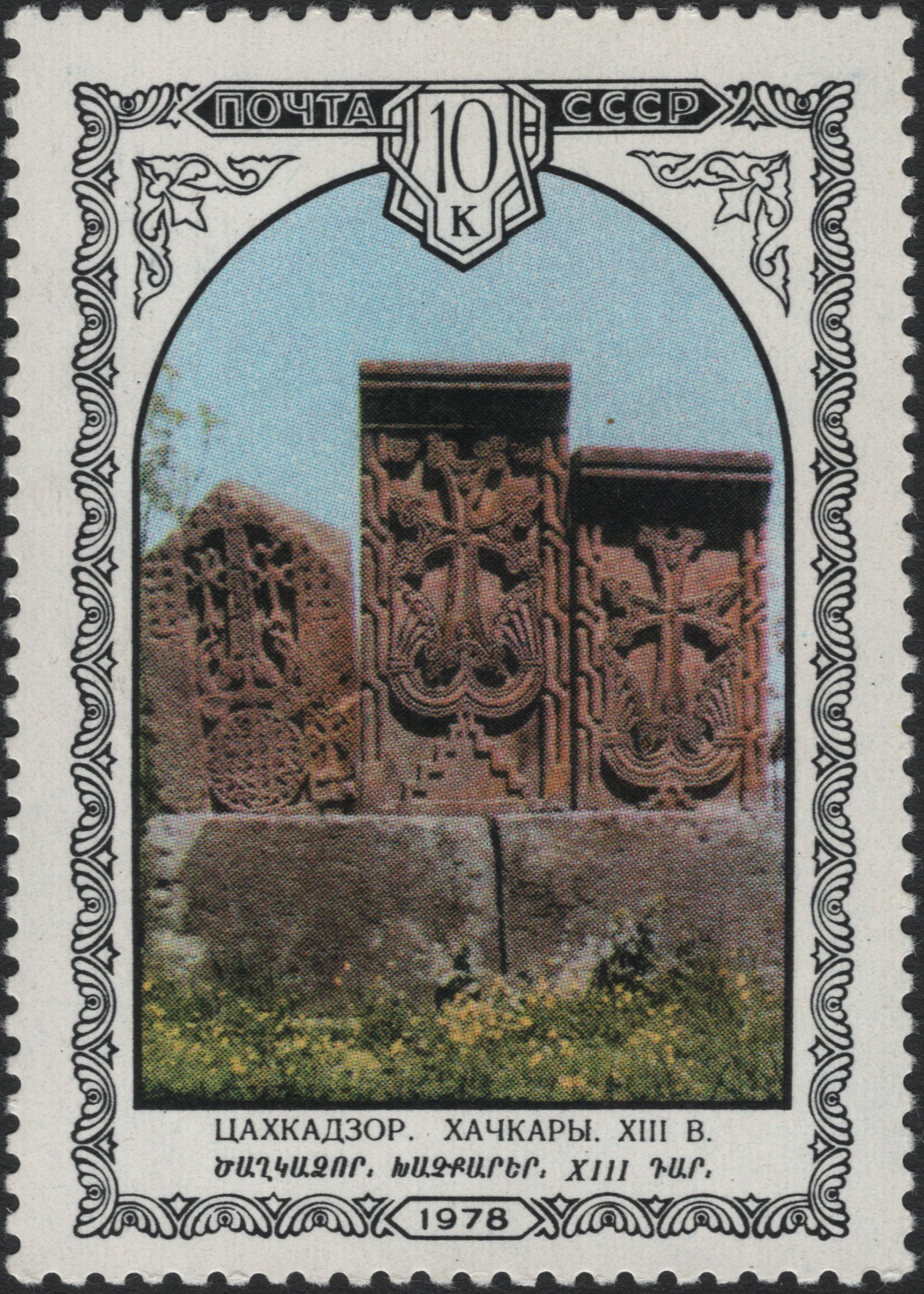
Khachkars, Tsaghkadzor, 13th century

Tsaghkadzor was first mentioned as Tsaghkunyats Dzor during the 3rd century when it was formed as a small settlement and quickly became the favourite hunting ground for the Arsacid kings of Armenia. During the 4th and 5th centuries, Tsaghkunyats Dzor, along the surrounding lands and forests, was placed under the governance of the Varazhnuni noble family by the Arsacid kings. Later, between the 5th and 7th centuries, during the period of Sasanian rule in Armenia, the region was granted to the Kamsarakan and Amatuni families.

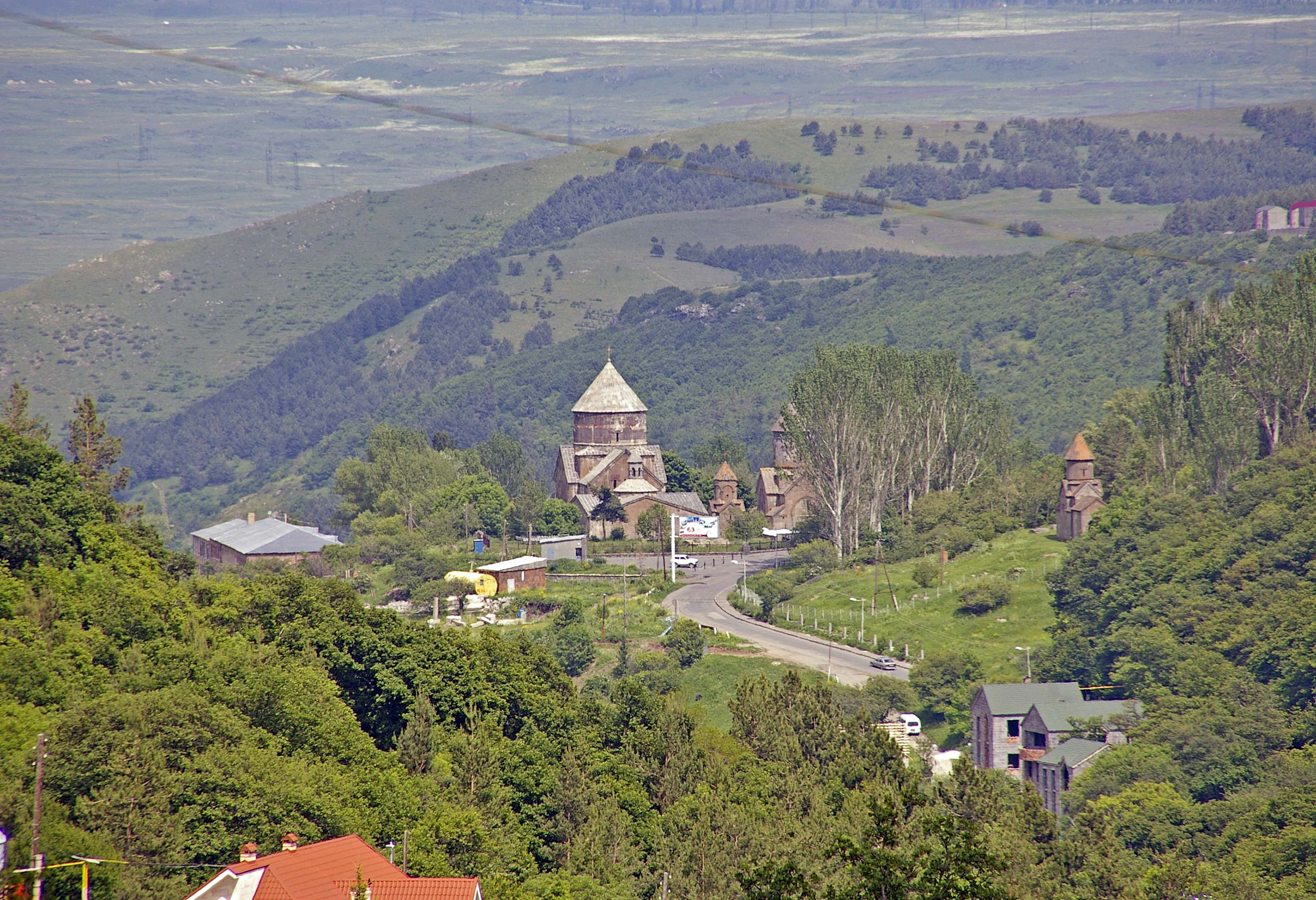
Kecharis Monastery

In the 9th century, Tsaghkunyats Dzor became part of the Bagratid Kingdom of Armenia established in 885. Starting from the 10th century, the houses of Kamsarakan and Pahlavuni—both related to the Arsacid dynasty by origins—were merged and governed the cantons of Aragatsotn, Kotayk and Varazhnunik. Prince Grigor Magistros of the Pahlavuni family became the head of the Kecharis Principality and built the Kecharis Monastery in 1033, in honor of Gregory the Illuminator. In 1051, he also built the Surp Nshan Church (Holy Sign Church). During this period, the town was known as Kecharuyk.

In the mid-11th century, the region suffered from the Seljuk invasion led by Tughril and later by his successor Alp Arslan. However, with the establishment of the Zakarid Principality of Armenia in 1201 under the Georgian protectorate, Kecharuyk witnessed a significant rise in economic and cultural life under the rule of the Khaghbakyan and later the Proshyan noble families, during the 13th and the 14th centuries. After the Mongols captured Ani in 1236, Armenia turned into a Mongol protectorate as part of the Ilkhanate. After the fall of the Ilkhanate in the mid-14th century, the Zakarid princes ruled over Lori, Shirak, Kotayk, and Ararat plain until 1360 when they fell to the invading Turkic tribes.

=== 16th to 19th centuries ===
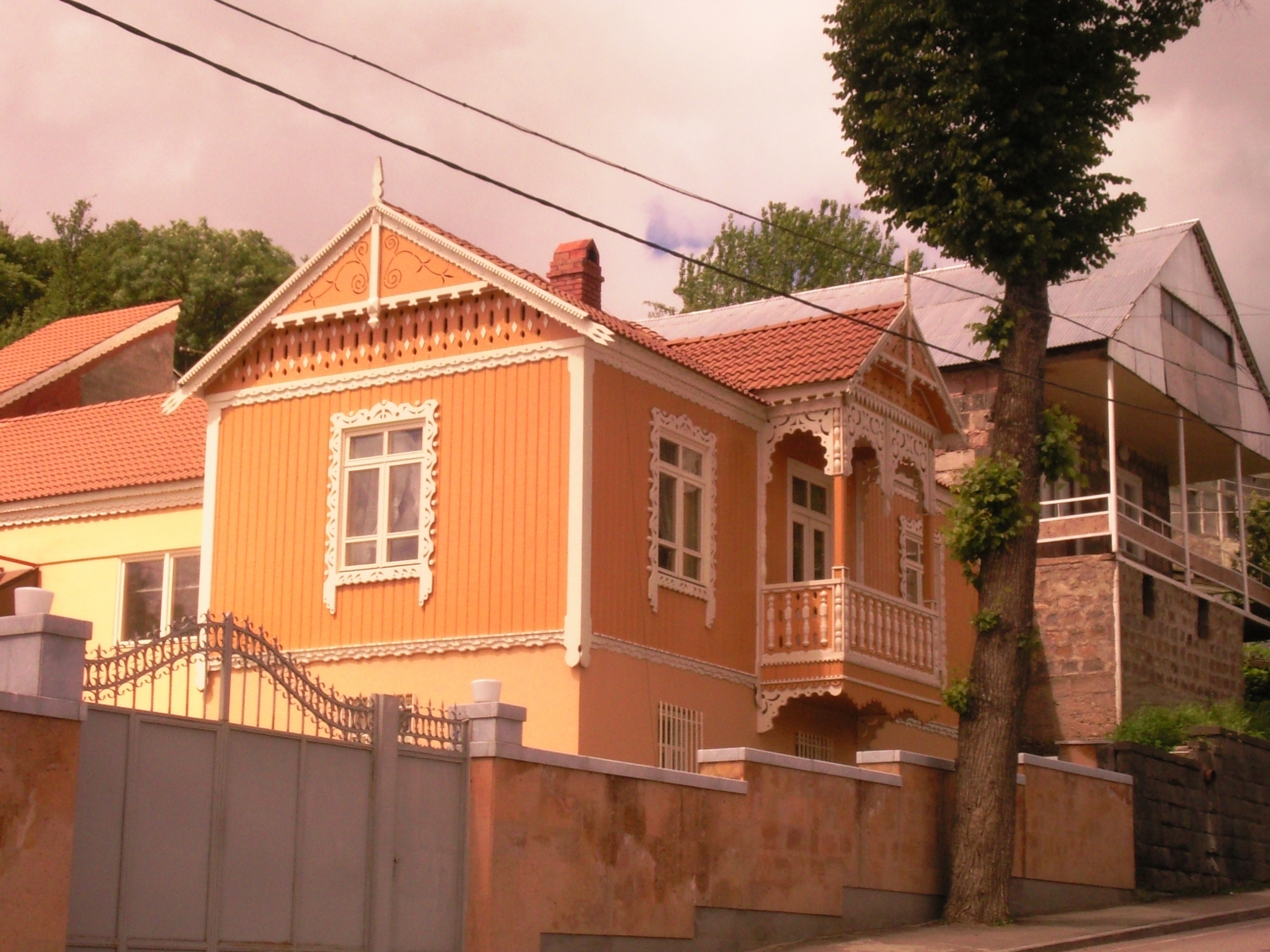
A Molokan house in Tsaghkadzor

At the beginning of the 16th century, Kecharuyk became part of the Erivan Province within Safavid Persia. Kecharuyk became known as Darachichak under Persian rule. During the first half of the 18th century, Darachichak became part of the Erivan Khanate under the rule of the Afsharid dynasty and later under the Qajar dynasty of Persia. Within the Erivan Khanate, Darachichak, along with Bjni, was one of the centers of the Darachichak mahal (district), which extended from the border with Georgia to the northern edge of Lake Sevan. It was favored as a summer resort by the elite of the khanate, including the khan, because of its mild climate. On 8 October 1827, a powerful earthquake occurred near Tsaghkadzor, destroying churches in the settlement and affecting communities across northeastern Armenia. Tsaghkadzor remained under the Persian rule until 1827–28, when Eastern Armenia was ceded by the Russian Empire as a result of the Russo-Persian War of 1826–28 and the signing of the Treaty of Turkmenchay. Under Russian rule, it continued to function as a summer resort, and as a resettlement area for tribes of Spiritual Christians from Russia after 1840. Many state institutions based in Yerevan temporarily moved to Tsaghkadzor each summer.

=== Modern history ===
With the fall of the Russian Empire and after the decisive Armenian victory over the Turks in the battles of Sardarabad, Abaran, and Gharakilisa, the entire region of Kotayk became part of the independent Armenia in May 1918.

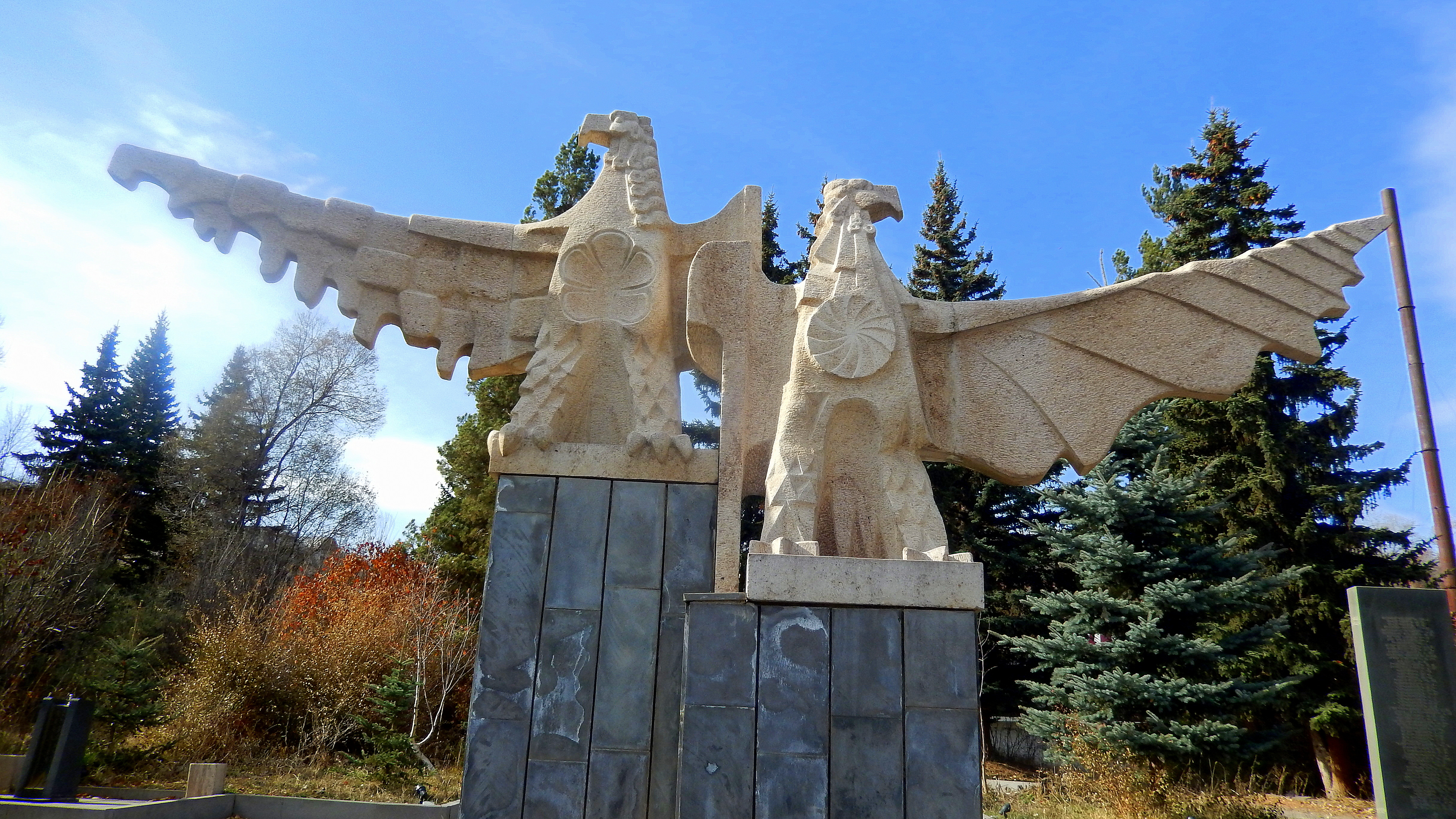
The hawk sculpture at the central Tsaghkunyats Square

After 2 years of brief independence, Armenia became part of the Soviet Union in December 1920. In 1930, Darachichak was included in the newly formed Akhta District (later renamed Hrazdan District in 1959). In 1947 the village of Darachichak was renamed Tsaghkadzor. In 1958, it was incorporated into an urban-type settlement.

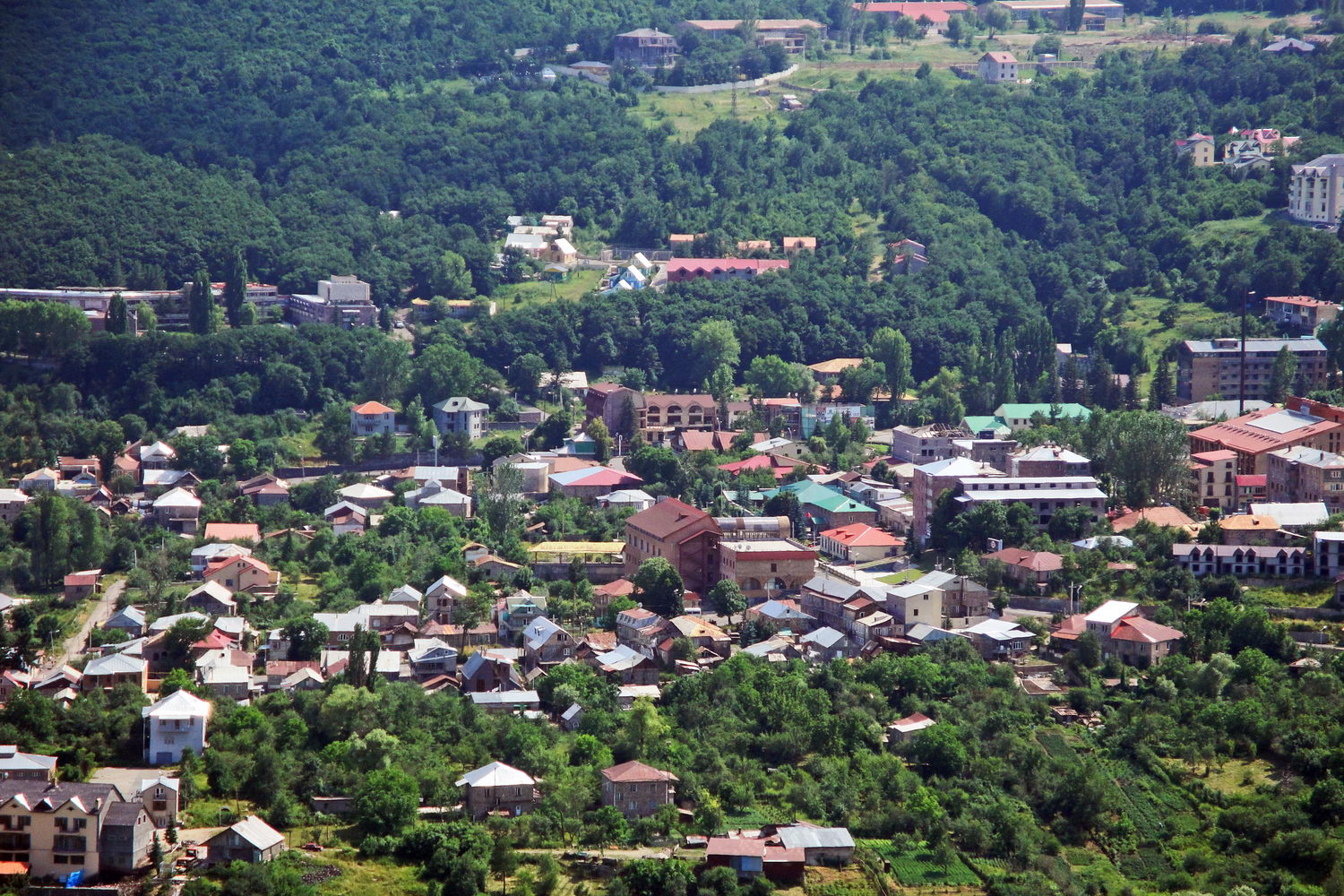
View of Tsaghkadzor

During the Soviet era, Tsaghkadzor was developed as a major resort town, intended to attract a large number of tourists. Many monumental buildings and dachas previously built by the wealthy merchants of Yerevan and Tiflis were either nationalized or sold in auctions. In 1958, it was given the status of an urban-type settlement. In 1959, it became part of the Hrazdan District. Later in 1984, Tsaghkadzor was given the status of a town.

In 1989–1992, thousands of Armenians displaced from Azerbaijan as a result of the Nagorno-Karabakh conflict were temporarily housed in Tsaghkadzor.

After the independence of Armenia, Tsaghkadzor entered a new era of redevelopment starting from 2000. With the foundation of many luxurious hotels and sanatoriums, the town became a major winter resort attracting a large number of ski and snowboard enthusiasts from all over the world, to become one of the most developed tourist destinations in Armenia.

On 11 August 2008, around 90 American Peace Corps volunteers, trainees and staff members were relocated to Tsaghkadzor from the Republic of Georgia as a precaution during the military conflict with Russia.

== Geography ==
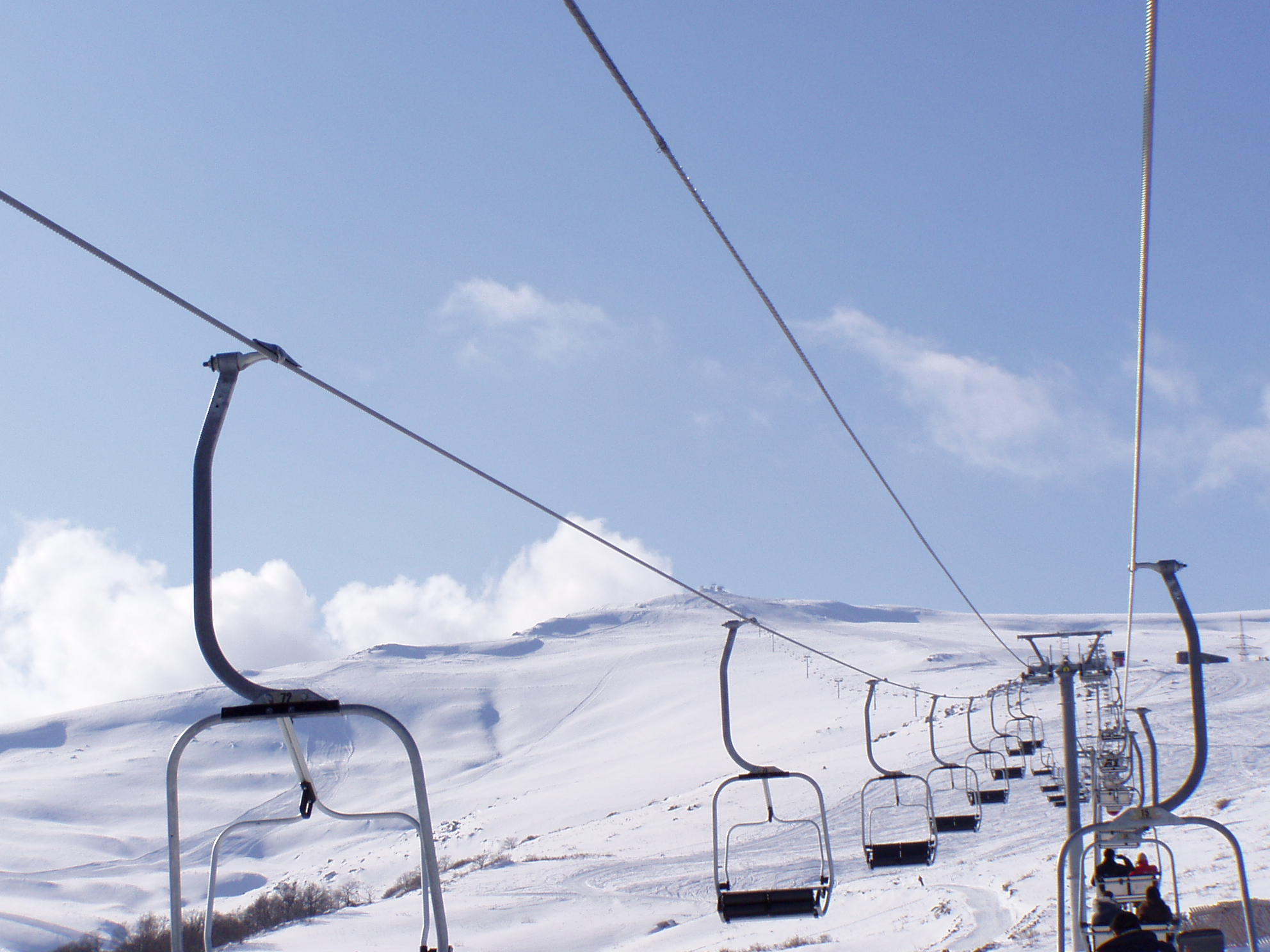
Mount Teghenis, vertical drop (850 m [2,790 ft])

Tsaghkadzor is located 5 kilometres (3.1 mi) northwest of the provincial capital Hrazdan and 58 kilometres (36 mi) northeast of the capital Yerevan. Surrounded with alpine meadows, the town is situated on the southeastern slope of Mount Teghenis, at a height of 1841 meters above sea level. Tsaghkadzor is surrounded by the Tsaghkunyats mountain range from the west, and the town of Hrazdan from the east.

Summers in Tsaghkadzor are characterized with mild climate, while winters are cold and snowy.

== Demographics ==
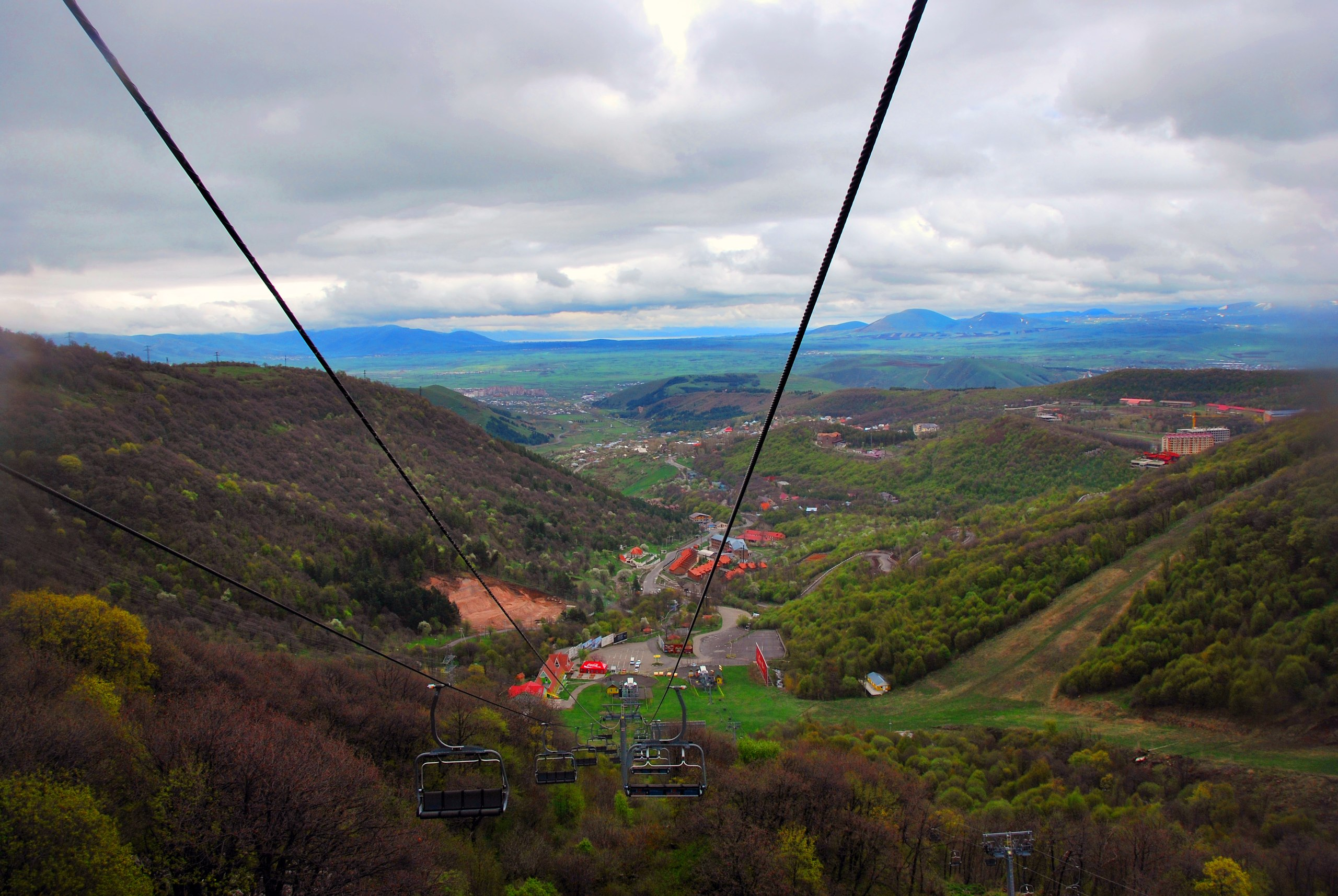
View of Tsaghkadzor from the ski lift

Historical population
Year	Pop.	±% p.a.
1873	169	—
1897	345	+3.02%
1926	618	+2.03%
1939	654	+0.44%
1959	1,029	+2.29%
1976	2,000	+3.99%
1989	3,350	+4.05%
1991	2,900	−6.96%
2001	1,618	−5.67%
2011	1,256	−2.50%
2022	1,010	−1.96%

== Culture ==
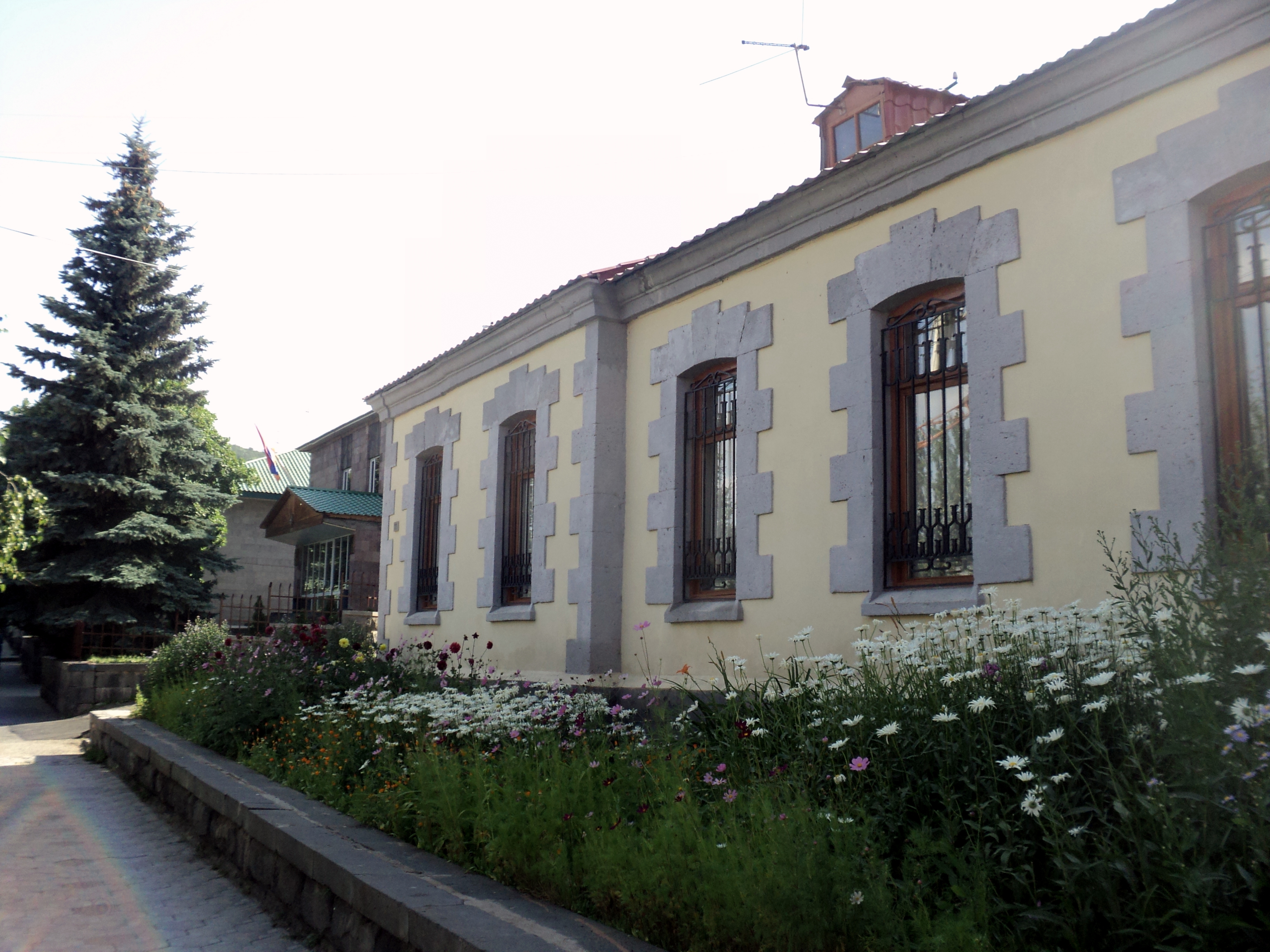
Orbeli Brothers Museum

Tsaghkadzor has a cultural palace and a public library. The city day of Tsaghkadzor is celebrated annually on October 3.

The Kecharis Monastery is one of the significant religious complexes of Eastern Armenia and a well-preserved example of medieval Armenian architecture. It was founded at the beginning of the 11th century. It consists of four separate churches. The main church of the complex is the Saint Gregory's Church, built in 1033. The Holy Cross (Surb Nshan) Church, built in 1051, is located to the south of Saint Gregory's Church. The Katoghike Church. built at the beginning of the 13th century, stands to the south of Surb Nshan Church. The fourth church of the complex is the Church of the Holy Resurrection (Surb Harutyun), built in 1220.

The house-museum of the Orbeli brothers, is dedicated to the Armenian scholars Ruben, Leon and Joseph Orbeli; Leon Orbeli was born in Tsaghkadzor. Ruben Orbeli was the founder of Soviet marine archaeology and a major specialist of ocean engineering. Leon Orbeli was a physiologist and a prominent member of the academies of science of the USSR and Armenian SSR. Joseph Orbeli was an orientalist who specialized in the medieval history of the South Caucasus. He administered the Hermitage Museum of Saint Petersburg between 1934 and 1951.

== Transportation ==
Tsaghkadzor is accessible through the H-5 Road from the southeast and the H-28 Road from the northwest. The H-29 Road connects the town with Gegharkunik and northeastern Armenia, via the town of Hrazdan. Public transport to Tsaghkadzor is available from Hrazdan city.

== Economy and tourism ==
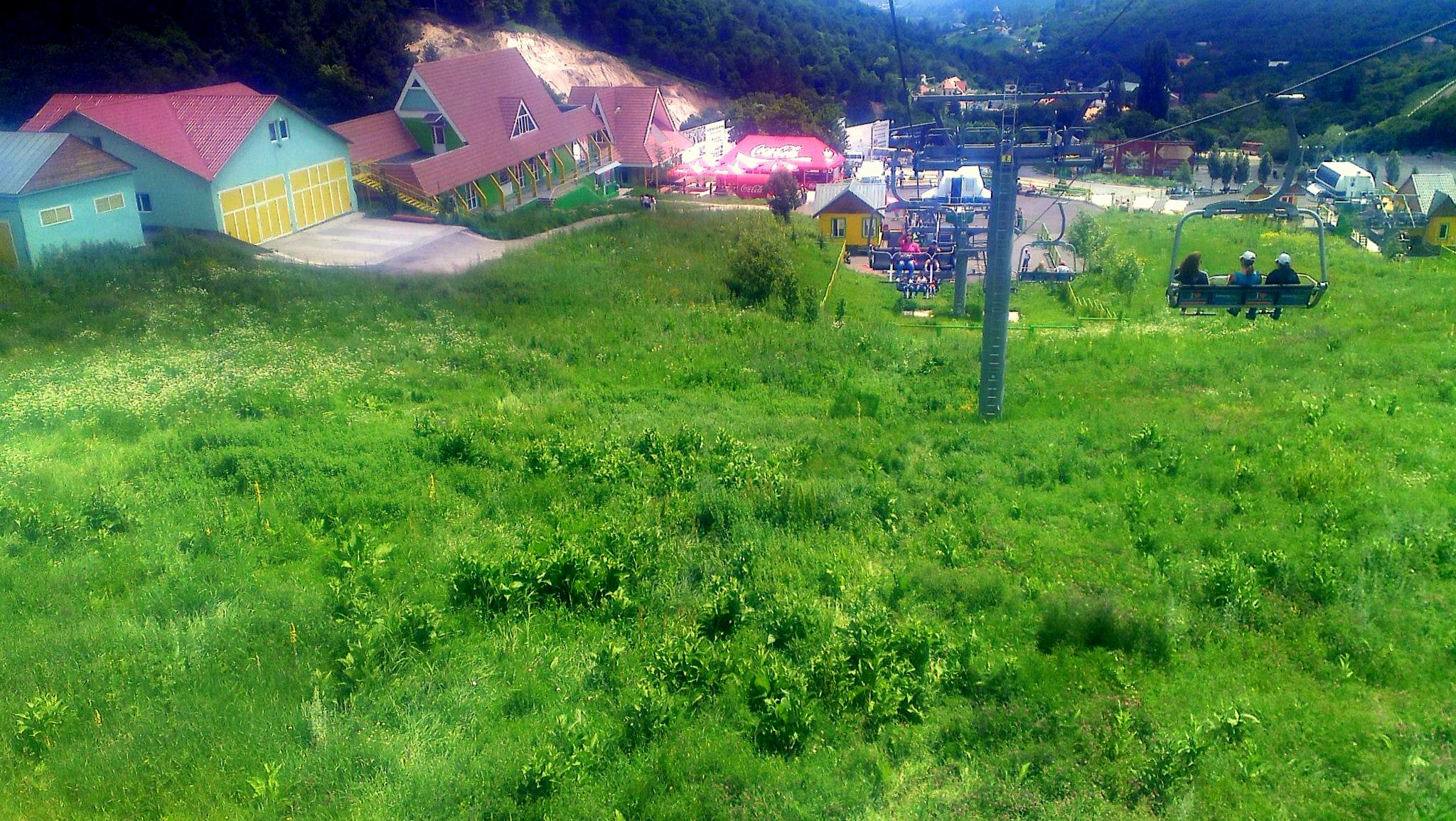
Tsaghkadzor ski resort seen from the ski lift at spring time

The infrastructure of tourism is highly developed in Tsaghkadzor, with many luxurious hotels, resorts and amusement facilities.

Tsaghkadzor ski resort is located just above the town, at a height of 1,750 meters above sea level. It was fully modernized during the first decade of the 21st century. All of the cableway lifts are manufactured and operated by the Leitner Group. The current structure replaced the old soviet-era lifts, mostly following their path. There were initially 3 consecutive lifts stretching from the foot of the mountain at a height of 1969 meters above sea level, up till the mountain peak at 2,819 meters high, with the first and second lifts ending at 2,234 meters and 2,465 meters high, respectively. In 2006 a fourth lift was added, stretching from the end of the first stage towards an opposite hilltop, thus adding two trails, both leading down to the foot of the slopes. Apart from the lifts the resort offers ski and snowboard rental as well as skiing instructors. The skiing season in Tsaghkadzor normally starts in mid-December and stretches well into March with the top slopes often fit for skiing in April.

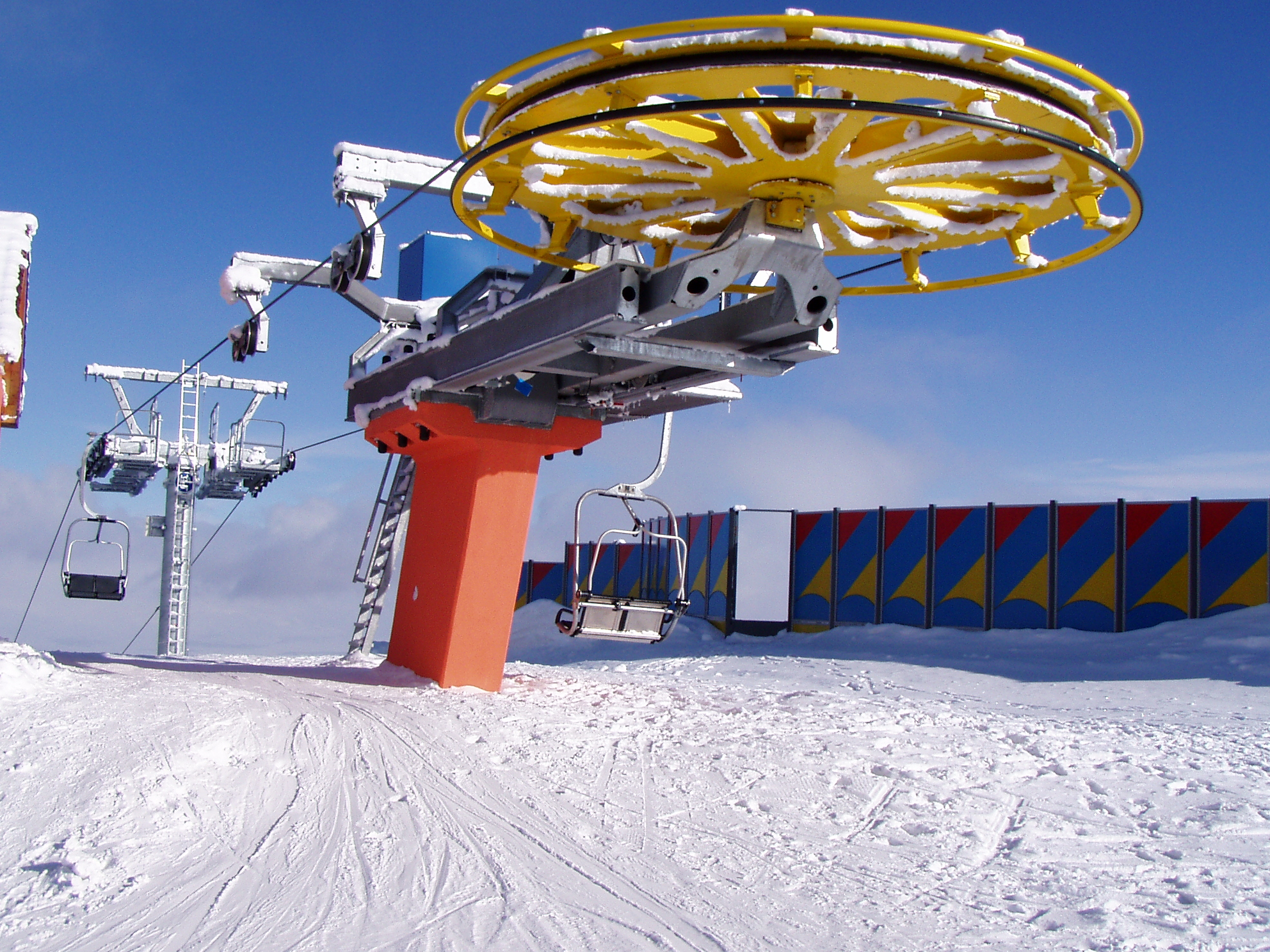
The highest lift at 2,819 meters on Mount Teghenis

Tsaghkadzor has the second most hotels of any town in Armenia, surpassed only by Yerevan. Many luxury hotels and resorts were opened recently to serve the town during the summer and winter seasons, including the Marriott Tsaghkadzor Hotel and Eighty Eight Hotel.

Tsaghkadzor is one of the three towns of Armenia that are allowed to accommodate gambling houses and activities within the city limits (along with Jermuk and Sevan).

== Education ==
With the town's diminishing population, currently Tsaghkadzor is home to 1 public education school.

Yerevan State University has a guesthouse in Tsaghkadzor.

== Sport ==
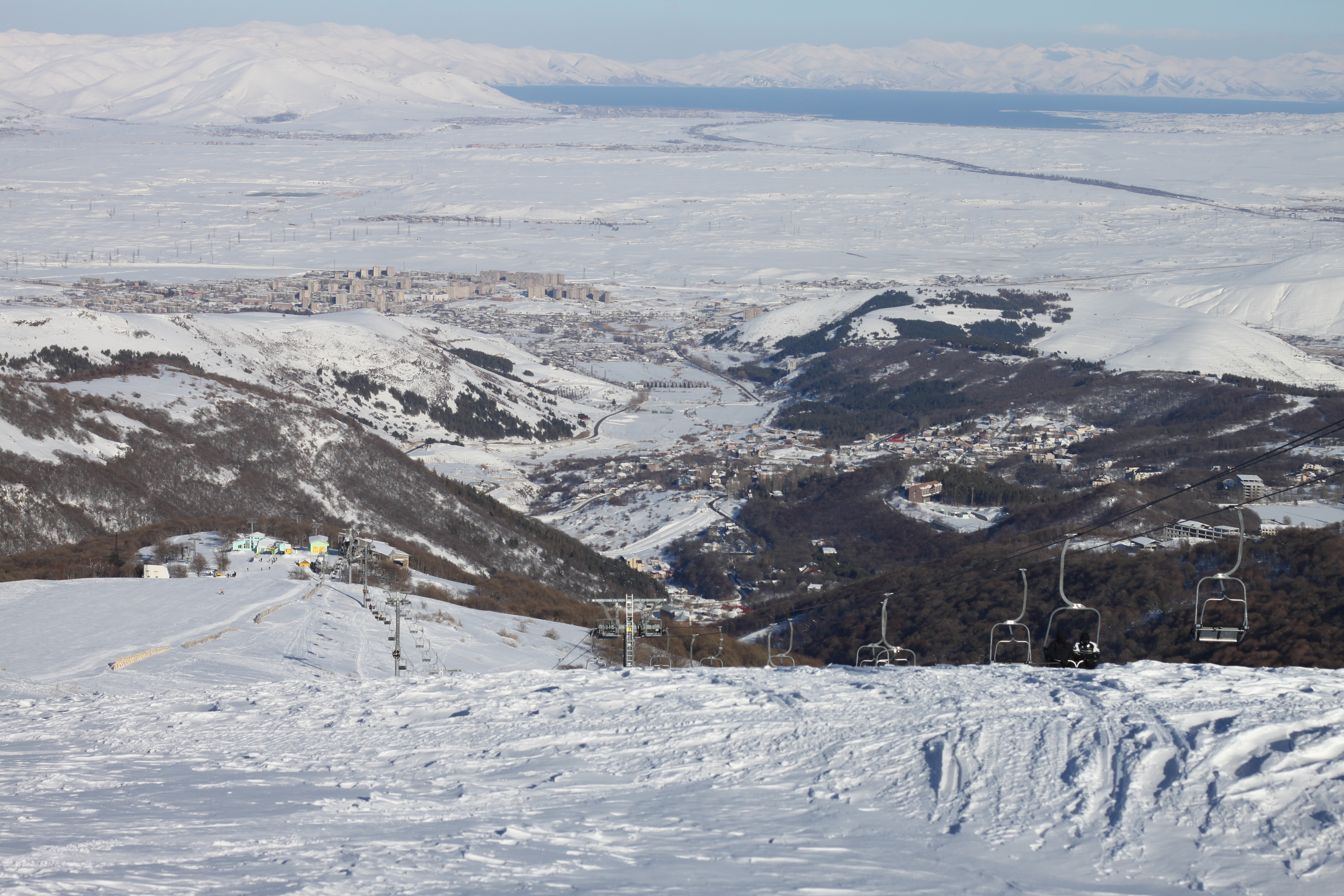
The view from the second ski route at the Tsaghkadzor ski resort

Tsaghkadzor is a major sports center for Armenia. The Tsaghkadzor Olympic Sports Complex was opened in 1967 through the efforts of the Olympic champion Hrant Shahinyan, specifically to host the preparation of the Soviet athletes for the 1968 Summer Olympics in Mexico City. Entirely renovated and reopened in 2008, it is considered one of the most developed training facilities in the South Caucasus, with its modernized hotel and sanatorium.

The Tsaghkadzor ski resort operating since 1986, is the centre of winter sports in Armenia. The skiing season in Tsaghkadzor normally starts in mid-December and stretches well into March with the top slopes often fit for skiing in April.

Tsaghkadzor hosted the 2015 FIDE World Team Chess Championship between 18 and 29 April 2015.

The Olympic complex hosts the annual competition of the "Best Sport Family" held every year during summer.

== Notable people ==
- Arsen Harutyunyan, Olympic alpine skier
- Leon Orbeli (1882–1958), Soviet-Armenian physiologist
- Abraham Sarkakhyan, Olympic alpine skier

== Sister cities ==
- Font-Romeu-Odeillo-Via, France

== See also ==
- Sport in Armenia
