= 2000 in Armenian football =

Premier League champions
- Araks Ararat

First League champions
- Armenicum

Armenian Cup winners
- Mika Ashtarak

2000 in Armenian football was the ninth season of independent football after the split-up from the Soviet Union. The Armenian Premier League for 2000 existed of 8 teams of which the lowest ranked teams would relegate to the Armenian First League. The seventh ranked team would enter the promotion/relegation play-off with the second ranked team of the First League. However it was decided that none of the Premier League teams would be relegated and four clubs were promoted from the First League, as well as FC Banants that was given a place at the highest level for the 2001 season. In the last few weeks Ararat, Zvartnots-AAL, Dinamo and Mika all refused to play once or more times as they were demanding fair play and claiming that referees penalised them repeatedly in favour of Araks that eventually won the title due to the awarded 3-0 victories in their favour.

== Premier League ==
- FC Dinamo Yerevan and FC Mika-Kasakh are promoted.
- FC Mika-Kasakh is renamed FC Mika
- Tsement changed their name to FC Araks Ararat.
- FC Yerevan and Erebuni-Homenmen both withdrew before the start of the season. As a result, Kilikia FC who were originally relegated kept their place.
- FC Lernagorts Kapan are additionally promoted to have an eight team competition.

| Pos | Team | Pld | W | D | L | GF | GA | GD | Pts | Qualification or relegation |
|---|---|---|---|---|---|---|---|---|---|---|
| 1 | Araks Ararat (C) | 28 | 19 | 4 | 5 | 65 | 33 | +32 | 61 | Qualification for the Champions League first qualifying round |
| 2 | Ararat Yerevan | 28 | 18 | 5 | 5 | 50 | 23 | +27 | 59 | Qualification for the UEFA Cup qualifying round |
| 3 | Shirak | 28 | 17 | 7 | 4 | 64 | 21 | +43 | 58 | Qualification for the Intertoto Cup first round |
| 4 | Mika | 28 | 15 | 4 | 9 | 45 | 31 | +14 | 49 | Qualification for the UEFA Cup qualifying round (Note: Winners of 2001 Armenian Cup.) |
| 5 | Zvartnots-AAL | 28 | 11 | 8 | 9 | 44 | 41 | +3 | 41 | |
| 6 | Kilikia | 28 | 9 | 3 | 16 | 49 | 56 | −7 | 30 | |
| 7 | Lernagorts Kapan | 28 | 3 | 3 | 22 | 29 | 82 | −53 | 12 | |
| 8 | Dinamo Yerevan (R) | 28 | 1 | 4 | 23 | 19 | 78 | −59 | 7 | Relegation to First League |
| 9 | Yerevan (W) | 0 | 0 | 0 | 0 | 0 | 0 | 0 | 0 | Withdrew (Note: Yerevan and Erebuni-Homenmen were withdraw before start of the season.) |
| 10 | Erebuni-Homenmen (W) | 0 | 0 | 0 | 0 | 0 | 0 | 0 | 0 | Withdrew |

(C) Champions; (R) Relegated; (W) Withdrew

=== Top goalscorers ===
| | | Player | Team | Goals |
|---|---|---|---|---|
| 1 | (Armenia) | Ara Hakobyan | Araks Ararat | 21 |
| 2 | (Armenia) | Tigran Yesayan | Ararat Yerevan | 17 |
| 3 | (Armenia) | Samvel Nikolyan | Mika Ashtarak | 15 |
| | (Armenia) | Artur Petrosyan | Shirak | 15 |
| | (Armenia) | Arman Karamyan | Kilikia | 15 |

== First League ==
- FC Armenicum and Tavush Ijevan are introduced to the league.
- Kotayk returned to professional football.

| Pos | Team | Pld | W | D | L | GF | GA | GD | Pts | Promotion |
|---|---|---|---|---|---|---|---|---|---|---|
| 1 | Armenicum | 16 | 12 | 3 | 1 | 55 | 12 | +43 | 39 | Champions, promotion to Armenian Premier League. |
| 2 | Karabakh Yerevan | 16 | 12 | 2 | 2 | 36 | 14 | +22 | 38 | Promotion to Armenian Premier League. |
| 3 | Lori | 16 | 9 | 2 | 5 | 34 | 24 | +10 | 29 | Promotion to Armenian Premier League. |
| 4 | Kotayk | 16 | 9 | 1 | 6 | 36 | 27 | +9 | 28 | Promotion to Armenian Premier League. |
| 5 | Arpa | 16 | 7 | 5 | 4 | 28 | 16 | +12 | 26 | |
| 6 | Dinamo-2 Yerevan | 16 | 5 | 3 | 8 | 23 | 32 | −9 | 18 | |
| 7 | FIMA | 16 | 3 | 3 | 10 | 25 | 35 | −10 | 12 | |
| 8 | Tavush | 16 | 2 | 4 | 10 | 22 | 52 | −30 | 10 | |
| 9 | Gyumri | 16 | 1 | 1 | 14 | 11 | 58 | −47 | 4 | |
| 10 | Dvin | 0 | - | - | - | - | - | — | 0 | Withdrew before start of the season. |
| 11 | Moush Kasakh | 0 | - | - | - | - | - | — | 0 | Withdrew before start of the season. |
| 12 | Nairit | 0 | - | - | - | - | - | — | 0 | Withdrew before start of the season. |
| 13 | Alashkert | 0 | - | - | - | - | - | — | 0 | Withdrew before start of the season. |
| 14 | Karabakh-2 Yerevan | 0 | - | - | - | - | - | — | 0 | Dropped since its parent team will participate instead. |

== Armenia Cup ==
| Quarter finals | | |
| FC Shirak | 1 - 1; 0 - 1 | Kilikia Yerevan |
| FC Zvartnots | 3 - 0; 1 - 2 | Dinamo Yerevan |
| Mika FC | 0 - 1; 2 - 0 | Araks Ararat |
| Lernagorts Kapan | 0 - 4 X - X | FC Ararat Yerevan |
| Semi finals | | |
| FC Zvartnots | 1 - 0 X - X | FC Kilikia Yerevan |
| Ararat Yerevan | 1 - 1; 3 - 4 | Mika FC |
| Final | | |
| Mika FC | 2 - 1 | FC Zvartnots |
