= 2000 Armenian First League =

Football league season

The 2000 Armenian First League season started on 21 April 2000. Armenicum became the league champions, and were promoted to the Armenian Premier League.

== Overview ==
- Armenicum joined the league
- Tavush joined the league
- Dinamo-2 Yerevan joined the league
- Karabakh-2 Yerevan was dropped from the league because its first team will participate due to relegation from the Premier League.

== Participating teams ==
Location of teams in the 2000 Armenian First League

Club	Location	Stadium	Capacity
Armenicum	Yerevan		
Karabakh Yerevan	Yerevan		
Lori	Vanadzor	Vanadzor City Stadium	4,000
Kotayk	Abovyan	Abovyan City Stadium	3,946
Arpa	Yeghegnadzor	Yeghegnadzor City Stadium	300
Dinamo-2 Yerevan	Yerevan		
FIMA	Yerevan		
Tavush	Ijevan	Arnar Stadium	2,100
Gyumri	Gyumri	Gyumri City Stadium	2,844

== League table ==
Pos	Team	Pld	W	D	L	GF	GA	GD	Pts	Promotion
1	Armenicum	16	12	3	1	55	12	+43	39	Champions, promotion to Armenian Premier League.
2	Karabakh Yerevan	16	12	2	2	36	14	+22	38	Promotion to Armenian Premier League.
3	Lori	16	9	2	5	34	24	+10	29	Promotion to Armenian Premier League.
4	Kotayk	16	9	1	6	36	27	+9	28	Promotion to Armenian Premier League.
5	Arpa	16	7	5	4	28	16	+12	26	
6	Dinamo-2 Yerevan	16	5	3	8	23	32	−9	18	
7	FIMA	16	3	3	10	25	35	−10	12	
8	Tavush	16	2	4	10	22	52	−30	10	
9	Gyumri	16	1	1	14	11	58	−47	4	
10	Dvin	0	-	-	-	-	-	—	0	Withdrew before start of the season.
11	Moush Kasakh	0	-	-	-	-	-	—	0	Withdrew before start of the season.
12	Nairit	0	-	-	-	-	-	—	0	Withdrew before start of the season.
13	Alashkert	0	-	-	-	-	-	—	0	Withdrew before start of the season.
14	Karabakh-2 Yerevan	0	-	-	-	-	-	—	0	Dropped since its parent team will participate instead.

== Top goalscorers ==
	Player	Team	Goals
1	(Armenia) Vadim Kagramanov	Dinamo-2 Yerevan, Armenicum	17
2	(Armenia) Ararat Ghazaryan	Karabakh Yerevan	11
3	(Armenia) Vahe Tadevosyan	Kotayk	11

== See also ==
- 2000 Armenian Premier League
- 2000 Armenian Cup
- 2000 in Armenian football
