= 2008 Armenian First League =

Football league season

The 2008 Armenian First League season began on 5 April 2008 and ended on 14 November 2008. At the end of 28 rounds, Shengavit were crowned champions; however, they were not eligible for promotion since they were the reserve team of Ulisses, which already participated in the Armenian Premier League.

== Overview ==
- Shengavit entered the competition representing the reserves of Ulisses FC.

== League table ==
Pos	Team	Pld	W	D	L	GF	GA	GD	Pts
1	Shengavit (C)	28	18	6	4	56	19	+37	60
2	Pyunik-2	28	14	7	7	50	40	+10	49
3	Banants-2	28	13	6	9	62	52	+10	45
4	Mika-2	28	11	9	8	31	26	+5	42
5	Gandzasar-2	28	11	8	9	50	45	+5	41
6	Ararat-2	28	6	10	12	29	39	−10	28
7	Shirak-2	28	5	6	17	22	54	−32	21
8	Patani	28	3	10	15	32	57	−25	19

(C) Champions

== Top goalscorers ==
		Player	Team	Goals
1	(Armenia)	Semion Muradyan	Banants-2	21
2	(Armenia)	Mihran Manasyan	Pyunik-2	12
3	(Armenia)	Sargis Aroyan	Pyunik-2	12
4	(Armenia)	Hovhannes Hambartsumyan	Banants-2	10
5	(Armenia)	Garegin Mashumyan	Shengavit	10

== See also ==
- 2008 Armenian Premier League
- 2008 Armenian Cup
