= 2014–15 Armenian First League =

Football league season

The 2014–15 Armenian First League season began on 5 August 2014 and finished on 3 June 2015.

== League table ==
Pos	Team	Pld	W	D	L	GF	GA	GD	Pts
1	Alashkert II (C)	28	19	6	3	83	27	+56	63
2	Banants II	28	19	3	6	73	30	+43	60
3	Pyunik II	28	16	4	8	55	39	+16	52
4	Ararat II	28	11	4	13	56	62	−6	37
5	Gandzasar II	28	7	6	15	35	77	−42	27
6	Ulisses II	28	8	2	18	49	86	−37	26
7	Shirak II	28	6	8	14	36	49	−13	26
8	Mika II	28	6	7	15	43	60	−17	25

Source: soccerway.com
Rules for classification: 1) points; 2) goal difference; 3) number of goals scored
(C) Champions

== See also ==
- 2014–15 Armenian Premier League
- 2014–15 Armenian Cup
