= 2000 Armenian Premier League =

Football league season

Statistics of Armenian Premier League in the 2000 season.

All statistics and match data henceforth has been graciously provided by the RSSSF unless otherwise stated.

- FC Dinamo Yerevan and FC Mika-Kasakh are promoted.
- FC Mika-Kasakh is renamed FC Mika
- Tsement changed their name to FC Araks Ararat.
- FC Yerevan and Erebuni-Homenmen both withdrew before the start of the season. As a result, Kilikia FC who were originally relegated kept their place.
- FC Lernagorts Kapan are additionally promoted to have an eight team competition.

== League table ==
| Pos | Team | Pld | W | D | L | GF | GA | GD | Pts | Qualification or relegation |
|---|---|---|---|---|---|---|---|---|---|---|
| 1 | Araks Ararat (C) | 28 | 19 | 4 | 5 | 65 | 33 | +32 | 61 | Qualification for the Champions League first qualifying round |
| 2 | Ararat Yerevan | 28 | 18 | 5 | 5 | 50 | 23 | +27 | 59 | Qualification for the UEFA Cup qualifying round |
| 3 | Shirak | 28 | 17 | 7 | 4 | 64 | 21 | +43 | 58 | Qualification for the Intertoto Cup first round |
| 4 | Mika | 28 | 15 | 4 | 9 | 45 | 31 | +14 | 49 | Qualification for the UEFA Cup qualifying round (Note: Winners of 2001 Armenian Cup.) |
| 5 | Zvartnots-AAL | 28 | 11 | 8 | 9 | 44 | 41 | +3 | 41 | |
| 6 | Kilikia | 28 | 9 | 3 | 16 | 49 | 56 | −7 | 30 | |
| 7 | Lernagorts Kapan | 28 | 3 | 3 | 22 | 29 | 82 | −53 | 12 | |
| 8 | Dinamo Yerevan (R) | 28 | 1 | 4 | 23 | 19 | 78 | −59 | 7 | Relegation to First League |
| 9 | Yerevan (W) | 0 | 0 | 0 | 0 | 0 | 0 | 0 | 0 | Withdrew (Note: Yerevan and Erebuni-Homenmen were withdraw before start of the season.) |
| 10 | Erebuni-Homenmen (W) | 0 | 0 | 0 | 0 | 0 | 0 | 0 | 0 | Withdrew |

(C) Champions; (R) Relegated; (W) Withdrew

== Results ==
=== First half of season ===
| Home \ Away | AAR | ARA | DIN | KIL | LRG | MIK | SHI | ZVA |
|---|---|---|---|---|---|---|---|---|
| Araks Ararat | | 0–2 | 1–0 | 3–2 | 4–0 | 2–0 | 0–2 | 2–0 |
| Ararat Yerevan | 3–3 | | 1–0 | 2–1 | 5–0 | 2–1 | 0–1 | 0–0 |
| Dinamo Yerevan | 0–6 | 1–6 | | 2–4 | 4–2 | 0–1 | 1–1 | 1–3 |
| Kilikia | 1–3 | 1–2 | 3–1 | | 3–2 | 0–3 | 0–3 (Note: Match awarded.) | 1–1 |
| Lernagorts Kapan | 1–4 | 1–2 | 4–2 | 1–3 | | 1–3 | 0–4 | 1–2 |
| Mika Ashtarak | 2–2 | 0–1 | 5–1 | 2–0 | 2–0 | | 1–0 | 4–1 |
| Shirak | 6–0 | 1–0 | 3–0 | 2–1 | 13–1 | 0–0 | | 1–3 |
| Zvartnots-AAL | 2–2 | 4–0 | 2–0 | 3–1 | 3–1 | 2–0 | 1–1 | |

Legend: Blue = home team win; Yellow = draw; Red = away team win.

=== Second half of season ===
| Home \ Away | AAR | ARA | DIN | KIL | LRG | MIK | SHI | ZVA |
|---|---|---|---|---|---|---|---|---|
| Araks Ararat | | 2–1 | 3–0 (Note: Match awarded.) | 3–0 | 3–1 | 0–1 | 2–1 | 4–2 |
| Ararat Yerevan | 2–0 | | 4–1 | 1–0 | 2–1 | 3–0 | 0–0 | 2–0 |
| Dinamo Yerevan | 0–5 | 0–3 | | 0–5 | 1–1 | 0–1 | 1–4 | 1–1 |
| Kilikia | 1–2 | 3–1 | 5–1 | | 1–0 | 3–2 | 2–2 | 1–3 |
| Lernagorts Kapan | 3–5 | 0–2 | 0–0 | 1–0 | | 2–2 | 1–2 | 3–0 |
| Mika Ashtarak | 0–0 | 0–1 | 2–1 | 5–3 | 2–0 | | 0–3 | 2–1 |
| Shirak | 0–1 | 1–1 | 1–0 | 2–1 | 5–1 | 2–1 | | 0–0 |
| Zvartnots-AAL | 0–3 | 1–1 | 1–0 | 3–3 | 3–0 | 0–3 | 2–3 | |

Legend: Blue = home team win; Yellow = draw; Red = away team win.

== Top goalscorers ==
| # | Player | | Team | Goals |
|---|---|---|---|---|
| 1 | (Armenia) | Ara Hakobyan | Araks Ararat | 21 |
| 2 | (Armenia) | Tigran Yesayan | Ararat Yerevan | 17 |
| 3 | (Armenia) | Samvel Nikolyan | Mika | 15 |
| 3 | (Armenia) | Artur Petrosyan | Shirak | 15 |
| 3 | (Armenia) | Arman Karamyan | Kilikia | 15 |

== See also ==
- 2000 in Armenian football
- 2000 Armenian First League
- 2000 Armenian Cup
