= 2000 Armenian Cup =

Tournament details
- Country: Armenia
- Teams: 14

Final positions
- Champions: Mika
- Runners-up: Zvartnots-AAL

Tournament statistics
- Matches played: 25
- Goals scored: 84 (3.36 per match)

The 2000 Armenian Cup was the ninth edition of the Armenian Cup, a football competition. In 2000, the tournament had 16 participants, out of which only 1 was a reserve team.

== Results ==
=== First round ===
The first legs were played on 18 March 2000. The second legs were played on 29 March 2000.

Team 1	Agg.	Team 2	1st leg	2nd leg
Shirak	5–0	Dinamo-2	1–0	4–0
Kilikia	w/o*	Lori	n/a	n/a
Dinamo Yerevan	3–0	FIMA Yerevan	2–0	1–0
Dvin Artashat	1–17	Zvartnots-AAL	1–10	0–7
Araks Ararat	12–0	Kotayk	8–0	4–0
Karabakh	2–9	Mika	1–8	1–1
Nairi	w/o*	Lernagorts	n/a	n/a
Ararat Yerevan	6–0	Armenicum	2–0	4–0

Lori and Nairi withdrew from the competition.

=== Quarter-finals ===
The first legs were played on 9 April 2000. The second legs were played on 19 April 2000.

Team 1	Agg.	Team 2	1st leg	2nd leg
Shirak	1–2	Kilikia	0–1	1–1
Zvartnots-AAL	4–2	Dinamo Yerevan	3–0	1–2
Mika	2–1	Araks Ararat	0–1	2–0
Ararat Yerevan	4–0	Lernagorts	4–0	n/a

=== Semi-finals ===
The first legs were played on 4 May 2000. The second legs were played on 13 May 2000.

Team 1	Agg.	Team 2	1st leg	2nd leg
Ararat Yerevan	4–5	Mika	3–4	1–1
Zvartnots-AAL	1–0	Kilikia	1–0	abd*

- Kilikia walked off at 51' at 0-0 during the second leg, the match was then abandoned

=== Final ===
27 May 2000

Mika	2 – 1	Zvartnots-AAL
Mkrtchyan 33'; Nordikyan 75'		Avanesyan 44'

Kotayk Stadium, Abovyan
Attendance: 4,500
Referee: Karen Nalbandyan (Yerevan)

== See also ==
- 2000 Armenian Premier League
