= 2016–17 Armenian First League =

Football league season

The 2016–17 Armenian First League was the 25th season of the Armenian First League, Armenia's second-tier football competition. It began on 8 August 2016 and finished on 30 May 2017. Alashkert-2 were the defending champions.

== Teams ==
Locations of the 2017–18 Armenian First League teams

A total of 8 teams participated in this edition of the Armenian First League.

== League table ==
Pos	Team	Pld	W	D	L	GF	GA	GD	Pts	Promotion, qualification or relegation
1	Banants II (C)	24	17	4	3	63	23	+40	55	Ineligible for promotion to the 2017–18 Armenian Premier League
2	Pyunik II	24	14	5	5	65	28	+37	47	
3	Ararat II	24	11	9	4	36	20	+16	42	
4	Gandzasar II	24	11	5	8	33	37	−4	38	
5	Alashkert II	24	5	7	12	25	40	−15	22	
6	Shirak II	24	6	3	15	23	46	−23	21	
7	Erebuni	24	2	3	19	20	71	−51	9	Club declined promotion
8	Kotayk	0	0	0	0	0	0	0	0	Club withdrew after round 7, results expunged

Source: soccerway.com
Rules for classification: 1) Points; 2) Play-off (only if deciding champion); 3) Matches won; 4) Head-to-head points; 5) Head-to-head matches won; 6) Head-to-head goal difference; 7) Head-to-head goals scored; 8) Head-to-head away goals scored; 9) Goal difference; 10) Goals scored.
(C) Champions

== See also ==
- 2016–17 Armenian Premier League
- 2016–17 Armenian Cup
