= Ararat Harutyunyan =

Armenian footballer

Personal information
- Full name: Ararat Harutyunyan
- Date of birth: 24 August 1975 (age 51)
- Place of birth: Gyumri, Armenian SSR, Soviet Union
- Position: Defender

Senior career*
| Years | Team | Apps | (Gls) |
| 1998–2003 | Shirak | | |
| 2004 | Banants | 4 | (0) |
| 2005 | Kotayk | 13 | (1) |
| 2006 | Ulisses | 10 | (0) |
| 2007–2012 | Shirak | 69 | (6) |

International career^{‡}
| 2000–2003 | Armenia | 7 | (0) |
- * Club domestic league appearances and goals as of June 2009 ‡ National team caps and goals as of November 2009

Ararat Harutyunyan (Armenian: Արարատ Հարությունյան; born 24 August 1975) is an Armenian retired footballer. He last worked as the sporting director of Armenian Premier League club Shirak.

== National team statistics ==
Armenia national team
| Year | Apps | Goals |
|---|---|---|
| 2000 | 3 | 0 |
| 2001 | 2 | 0 |
| 2002 | 1 | 0 |
| 2003 | 1 | 0 |
| Total | 7 | 0 |
