= Ara Hakobyan =

Armenian footballer (born 1980)

Personal information
- Date of birth: 4 November 1980 (age 46)
- Place of birth: Yerevan, Armenian SSR
- Height: 1.75 m (5 ft 9 in)
- Position: Forward

Senior career*
Years	Team	Apps	(Gls)
1997–1999	Dvin Artashat	37	(25)
1999	Tsement Ararat	11	(2)
1999	Alania Vladikavkaz	4	(0)
2000	Araks Ararat	19	(21)
2001–2006	Metalurh Donetsk	26	(2)
2001	→ Stal Alchevsk (loan)	12	(1)
2001	→ Spartak Yerevan (loan)	1	(0)
2001	→ Metalurh-2 Donetsk	11	(4)
2002	→ Stal Alchevsk (loan)	9	(3)
2002	→ Spartak Yerevan (loan)	15	(21)
2003	→ Banants Yerevan (loan)	24	(45)
2004	→ Stal Dniprodzerzhynsk (loan)	10	(3)
2005	→ Stal Alchevsk (loan)	32	(18)
2006	→ Stal Alchevsk (loan)	13	(0)
2007	Illichivets Mariupol	5	(0)
2007	Banants Yerevan	5	(4)
2007–2008	Zimbru Chișinău	18	(2)
2008	Gomel	13	(3)
2009	Mika Yerevan	20	(7)
2010	Ulisses Yerevan	6	(2)
2010–2011	Mes Sarchesme		
2011–2012	Ararat Yerevan	20	(2)
2012	Alashkert		

International career
1998–2009	Armenia	42	(7)
- * Club domestic league appearances and goals

Ara Hakobyan (Armenian: Արա Հակոբյան, born on 4 November 1980) is an Armenian retired professional footballer who played as forward for the Armenia national team and participated in 42 international matches and scored 7 goals since his debut in a home friendly match on 21 November 1998. Hakobyan played for many Armenian and Ukrainian football clubs.

== Club career ==
Ara's career began in Dvin Artashat, where he played with his brother Aram Hakobyan. But a year later, Ara moved to Alania Vladikavkaz and Aram to FC Spartak Yerevan. Next year their way came together again in Spartak Yerevan. With Hakobyan the club won its only Championship, the 2000 Armenian Premier League.

=== Metalurh Donetsk and loans ===
At the end of the Armenian Premier League season, Hakobyan moved to FC Metalurh Donetsk. However, he rarely played for the club, as the club is constantly loaned him out to the Ukrainian and Armenian Club. In the 2001–2002 season, he played in Spartak Yerevan. At the end of the season of Spartak merged with Banants Kotayk into a single club called Banants Yerevan. Hakobyan was at the club while transiting to Stal Alchevsk. In Banants, Hakobyan played one season and became an Armenian Cup finalist and Armenia's top scorer and Armenian Footballer of the Year in the 2003 season.

With the successful performance in Banants, Hakobyan returned to Donetsk, but only briefly. Club sent him back into the rental loan. Until 2009, Hakobyan never spent a full season after serving the team. After the permanent lease in 2007 and ending a contract with Metalurh, Hakobyan goes into Illychivets Mariupol, then in Kishinev Zimbru Chişinău. In Banants, he played in the summer interval Championship and moved to Zimbru Chişinău. Having played the end of 2007 and beginning of 2008, he joined FC Gomel.

=== Mika Yerevan ===
For the 2009 Armenian Premier League season, Hakobyan began playing for Mika Yerevan. His only season at the club held relatively full. With 7 goals scored, he did not make 10 of the top scorers in the championship. On 1 December 2009, his contract had expired with Mika. Renew it Hakobyan did not, giving it his priority interventions abroad. During the off season, Ara Hakobyan had gone through viewing FC Minsk, which had not attracted the coaches, as well as to return to former club, but here the dialogue regarding the contract has not come to an end.

=== Ulisses ===
In late winter, Hakobyan conduct training in Yerevan's Ulisses, for which he took part in the test match. In February 2010, he entered into a contract with the club for one year. In August, Hakobyan left the club, hoping to move to a foreign club. But the proposal had been received, thus ending the championship and Hakobyan ended in engaging in individual workouts.

=== Ararat Yerevan ===
In February 2011, the head coach of Ararat Yerevan said that Hakobyan will perform in the capital club. A contract with Ararat was signed for one year. Hakobyan spoke steadily, efficiently, had become a mainstream figure in the team, but after the summer break, decided to leave the club. Desire for Hakobyan was a performance for the border, in one of the clubs. A little later, was browsing in one of the Polish first division clubs, whose name was to be announced at the conclusion of the negotiations. The talks have not been fruitful and Hakobyan returned home. Before the beginning of the season, he had become known for the return of Ararat. The desire to act in Ararat Hakobyan expressed himself. But after a conversation with the head coach Albert Safaryan, negotiations have dragged on and the contract was signed in the near future. The agreement is valid until May 2013. But, the second coming of the club for Hakobyan did not last long. In June, the parties terminated the contract by mutual consent and Hakobyan left the club. As soon as it became known that, he moved to Alashkert Martuni, for which stands brother Aram Hakobyan.

== International career ==
Hakobyan was a player of the Armenia national football team from 1998 to 2009. During this time, Hakobyan participated in 42 games and scored 7 goals. His first match with the national team was on 21 November 1998 in a friendly home game against Estonia. He is the fifth top goalscorer in history for the national team.

== Personal life ==
Ara's brother Aram Hakobyan is also a football player who has also played for the Armenia national team and many Armenian clubs.

== Career statistics ==
Armenia national team
Year	Apps	Goals
1998	1	0
1999	2	0
2000	4	0
2001	2	0
2002	1	0
2003	2	0
2004	6	1
2005	8	3
2006	4	0
2007	3	1
2008	8	2
2009	1	0
Total	42	7

#	Date	Venue	Opponent	Score	Result	Competition
1.	28 April 2004	Armenia	Turkmenistan	1–0	Win	Friendly
2.	26 March 2005	Armenia	Andorra	2–1	Win	2006 WCQ
3.	7 August 2005	Czech Rep.	Czech Republic	1–4	Loss	2006 WCQ
4.	10 October 2005	Andorra	Andorra	3–0	Win	2006 WCQ
5.	14 January 2007	United States	Panama	1–1	Draw	Friendly
6.	2 February 2008	Malta	Malta	1–0	Win	Malta Tmt.
7.	4 February 2008	Malta	Belarus	2–1	Win	Malta Tmt.

== Honours ==
Spartak Yerevan

- Armenian Premier League (1): 2000
- Armenian Premier League Runner-up (1): 2002
- Armenian Premier League 3rd place (1): 1999

Banants

- Armenian Cup Runner-up (1): 2003

Mika

- Armenian Premier League Runner-up (1): 2009

Individual

- Armenian Premier League Top Goalscorer (3): 1998, 2000, 2003
- Armenian Footballer of the Year (1): 2003
- Armenian Premier League Record For Most Goals Scored in a Season: 45 goals (2003)
