= Souren Barseghyan =

Armenian association football manager

Souren Barseghyan (Armenian: Սուրեն Բարսեղյանը; born 12 October 1959) is an Armenian association football manager, born in Yerevan, who managed the Armenia national team during UEFA Euro 2000 qualifying in 1998-99. He was the head coach of Mika Yerevan. Barseghyan also managed FC Kotayk Abovian in the Soviet First League and several Armenian Premier League clubs like Gandzasar Kapan, Ulisses and Mika Yerevan in the past.
