= FC Brașov in European football =

== Total statistics ==
Competition	S	P	W	D	L	GF	GA	GD
UEFA Europa League / UEFA Cup	1	6	2	2	2	6	6	0
Total	2	8	3	0	5	11	19	–8

== Statistics by country ==
Country	Club	P	W	D	L	GF	GA	GD
Armenia	FC Mika	2	2	0	0	7	1	+6
Subtotal		2	2	0	0	7	1	+6
Germany / West Germany	Hamburger SV	2	0	0	2	1	10	–9
Subtotal		2	0	0	2	1	10	–9
Italy	F.C. Internazionale Milano	2	0	0	2	0	6	–6
Subtotal		2	0	0	2	0	6	–6
Turkey	Beşiktaş J.K.	2	1	0	1	3	2	+1
Subtotal		2	1	0	1	3	2	+1
Total		8	3	0	5	11	19	–8

== Statistics by competition ==
=== UEFA Europa League / UEFA Cup ===
Season	Round	Country	Club	Home	Away	Aggregate
1974–75	First round	Turkey	Beşiktaş	3–0	0–2	3–2
1974–75	Second round	West Germany	Hamburger SV	1–2	0–8	1–10
2001–02	Qualifying round	Armenia	Mika	5–1	2–0	7–1
2001–02	First round	Italy	Internazionale	0–3	0–3	0–6
