= FC Moush =

FC Moush may refer to:

- FC Moush Charentsavan, an association football club from Charentsavan, Armenia.
- FC Moush Kasakh, an association football club from the village of Kasakh, Armenia.
