= 2001 Armenian Premier League =

Football league season

In the 2001 Armenian Premier League, FC Pyunik were the champions.

== Overview ==
- FC Armenicum, Karabakh Yerevan, Lori Vanadzor, and FC Kotayk were promoted from the Armenian First League last year. FC Armenicum were dissolved and yielded their place to the revived FC Pyunik.
- Newly established Dinamo-2000 Yerevan are allowed to participate in the premier league without competing in the Armenian First League first.
- In August 2001, Araks Ararat FC were dissolved and Spartak Yerevan took their place in the championship.
- FC Banants Kotayk demerged from Kotayk Abovyan and the owner of the club decided to move the club from Abovyan to Yerevan, and thus Banants Kotayk became FC Banants Yerevan. Despite not participating as a separate team in the 2000 Armenian First League, the club was allowed to participate in the 2001 Armenian Premier League season.
- Kilikia FC did not pay entrance fee and refused to play twice, leading to their expulsion. At the end of the season they were also relegated along with Lori Vanadzor.

== League table ==
Pos	Team	Pld	W	D	L	GF	GA	GD	Pts	Qualification or relegation
1	Pyunik (C)	22	17	2	3	77	23	+54	53	Qualification for the Champions League first qualifying round
2	Zvartnots-AAL	22	16	0	6	52	21	+31	48	Qualification for the UEFA Cup qualifying round
3	Spartak Yerevan	22	15	3	4	57	13	+44	48	Qualification for the UEFA Cup qualifying round
4	Shirak	22	14	5	3	52	19	+33	47	Qualification for the Intertoto Cup first round
5	Ararat Yerevan	22	13	3	6	42	22	+20	42	
6	Mika Ashtarak	22	12	5	5	44	20	+24	41	
7	Banants	22	10	4	8	46	28	+18	34	
8	Lernagorts Kapan	22	5	3	14	25	63	−38	18	
9	Dinamo-2000	22	4	4	14	18	48	−30	16	
10	Kotayk	22	3	3	16	19	65	−46	12	
11	Karabakh Yerevan	22	2	6	14	19	63	−44	12	
12	Lori Vanadzor	22	1	2	19	17	83	−66	5	Relegation to First League
13	Kilikia (E)	0	0	0	0	0	0	0	0	Expelled (Note: Kilikia were expelled after playing a one match.)

(C) Champions; (E) Expelled

== Results ==
Home \ Away	ARA	BAN	DIN	KAR	KOT	LRG	LOR	MIK	PYU	SPA	SHI	ZVA
Ararat Yerevan		1–0	1–0	3–0	5–1	5–0	6–0	0–2	0–3 (Note: Match awarded.)	0–2	2–1	2–1
Banants	0–1		2–0	5–2	3–0	5–1	6–0	0–1	1–1	2–2	2–2	1–0
Dinamo-2000	1–2	0–1		1–1	0–1	0–0	3–2	0–0	0–5	0–5	1–4	0–1
Karabakh Yerevan	3–3	1–4	0–2		1–0	0–0	3–0	0–3	1–6	0–3	0–6	1–3
Kotayk	0–4	2–4	1–2	2–2		2–0	3–0	1–3	2–10	0–4	0–2	0–5
Lernagorts Kapan	2–0	4–3	1–2	0–0	5–0		4–1	1–5	0–6	1–6	0–2	0–5
Lori Vanadzor	0–3	2–5	3–2	2–2	1–1	1–2		0–3	0–2	0–5	0–3	3–4
Mika Ashtarak	0–1	1–1	7–0	3–0	2–2	2–1	2–0		2–0	0–1	1–1	2–1
Pyunik	3–1	1–0	4–1	6–0	3–0	5–2	7–1	6–3		2–1	0–0	3–5
Spartak Yerevan	1–1	3–0	1–1	5–1	4–0	6–0	3–0	1–0	0–2		3–0	0–1
Shirak	1–1	1–0	4–1	3–1	3–1	3–0	6–1	2–2	3–0	2–0		2–1
Zvartnots-AAL	1–0	2–1	2–1	3–0	2–0	4–1	8–0	1–0	0–2	0–1	2–1	

Legend: Blue = home team win; Yellow = draw; Red = away team win.

== Top goalscorers ==
#	Player		Team	Goals
1	(Armenia)	Arman Karamyan	Pyunik	21
2	(Armenia)	Hayk Hakobyan	Spartak Yerevan	16
3	(Armenia)	Mher Avanesyan	Zvartnots-AAL	15
4	(Armenia)	Aram Hakobyan	Spartak Yerevan	15
5	(Ukraine)	Andrey Bulanov	Mika Ashtarak	12
5	(Armenia)	Sargis Nazaryan	Zvartnots-AAL	12

== See also ==
- 2001 in Armenian football
- 2001 Armenian First League
- 2001 Armenian Cup
