= Patani FC =

- Full name: Patani Football Club
- Founded: 2006
- Dissolved: 2008
- 2008: Armenian First League, 8th

Patani Football Club (Armenian: Ֆուտբոլային Ակումբ Պատանի) was an Armenian football club from the capital Yerevan. They were consisted of the Armenia national under-17 football team and participated in the 2006, 2007 and 2008 Armenian First League seasons. They were dissolved in 2008.
