= 2006 Armenian Cup =

Tournament details
- Country: Armenia
- Teams: 12

Final positions
- Champions: Mika
- Runners-up: Pyunik

Tournament statistics
- Matches played: 21
- Goals scored: 46 (2.19 per match)

The 2006 Armenian Cup was the 15th edition of the Armenian Cup, a football competition. In 2006, the tournament had 12 participants, out of which 4 were reserve teams.

== Results ==
=== First round ===
Banants, Kilikia, Mika and Pyunik received byes to the quarter-finals.

The first legs were played on 25 and 26 March 2006. The second legs were played on 1 and 2 April 2006.

Team 1	Agg.	Team 2	1st leg	2nd leg
Gandzasar	7–1	Mika-2	3–1	4–0
Pyunik-2	1–3	Banants-2	1–0	0–3
Ararat Yerevan	7–1	Ararat-2 Yerevan	4–0	3–1
Shirak	2–1	Hay Ari	0–1	2–0

=== Quarter-finals ===
The first legs were played on 5 and 6 April 2006. The second legs were played on 9 and 10 April 2006.

Team 1	Agg.	Team 2	1st leg	2nd leg
Gandzasar	1–3	Mika	1–0	0–3
Kilikia	2–2 (4–3 p)	Banants-2	1–1	1–1
Pyunik	2–2 (6–5 p)	Ararat Yerevan	1–1	1–1
Shirak	1–2	Banants	0–0	1–2

=== Semi-finals ===
The first legs were played on 19 April 2006. The second legs were played on 27 April 2006.

Team 1	Agg.	Team 2	1st leg	2nd leg
Mika	4–0	Shirak	3–0	1–0
Pyunik	(a)2–2	Banants	1–0	1–2

=== Final ===
9 May 2006

Mika	1 – 0	Pyunik
Shahgeldyan 24'

Vazgen Sargsyan Republican Stadium, Yerevan
Attendance: 1,400
Referee: Karen Nalbandyan (Yerevan)

== See also ==
- 2006 Armenian Premier League
- 2006 Armenian First League
