= Armen Adamyan =

Armenian footballer

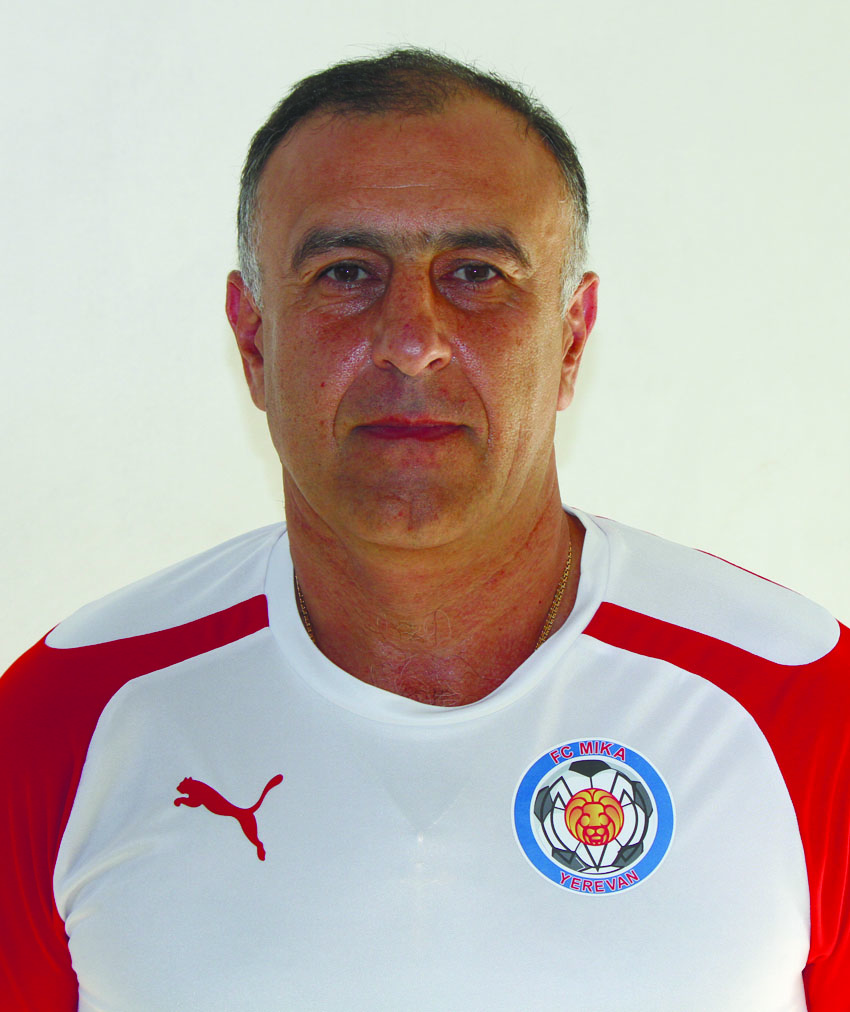

Personal information
- Full name: Armen Adamyan
- Date of birth: 14 October 1967 (age 59)
- Place of birth: Stepanakert, Soviet Union
- Height: 1.78 m (5 ft 10 in)
- Positions: Midfielder; striker

Senior career*
Years	Team	Apps	(Gls)
1984–1988	Karabakh Stepanakert	21	(4)
1988–1991	Kotayk Abovian	106	(13)
1991	Yerazank Stepanakert	3	(1)
1991–1993	Artsakh Stepanakert	10	(2)
1994–1995	Chernomorets Novorossiysk	15	(0)
1994	→ Kuban Slavyansk-na-Kubani	13	(9)
1995–2000	Kristall Smolensk	166	(50)
2001	Salam Zgharta		
2001–2002	Salyut-Energia Belgorod	47	(0)

International career
1998–1999	Armenia	3	(1)

Managerial career
- 2003: Kristall Smolensk (reserves)
- 2004: Darida Minsk Raion
- 2005–2007: MIKA
- 2008: Volga Ulyanovsk (assistant)
- 2009: Dnepr Smolensk
- 2009–2010: MIKA
- 2010–2011: MIKA-2
- 2011–2012: Volga Ulyanovsk
- 2014–2015: Zenit Penza (assistant)
- 2015: Mika
- 2016: Zenit Penza
- 2017–2018: Lori
- 2019–2020: Alashkert (caretaker)
- 2020: Sevan (assistant)
- 2021: Ararat-Armenia
- * Club domestic league appearances and goals

Armen Adamyan (Armenian: Արմեն Ադամյան; born 14 October 1967) is an Armenian professional football coach and a former player.

== Career ==
=== Club ===
As a player, he made his debut in the Soviet Second League in 1988 for FC Karabakh Stepanakert.

=== Coaching ===
On 4 September 2020, Adamyan replaced Abraham Khashmanyan as manager of FC Alashkert. At the end of the 2019–20 season, Adamyan was replaced by Yegishe Melikyan as manager of Alashkert.
