= 2001 Armenian Cup =

Tournament details
- Country: Armenia
- Teams: 16

Final positions
- Champions: Mika
- Runners-up: Ararat

Tournament statistics
- Matches played: 27
- Goals scored: 98 (3.63 per match)

The 2001 Armenian Cup was the tenth edition of the Armenian Cup, a football competition. In 2001, the tournament had 16 participants, one of which was a reserve team.

== Results ==
=== First round ===
The first legs were played on 7 and 8 April 2001. The second legs were played on 12 and 13 April 2001.

Team 1	Agg.	Team 2	1st leg	2nd leg
Ararat Yerevan	9–0	SKIF Yerevan	3–0	6–0
Lernagorts Kapan	3–4	Karabakh	1–1	2–3
Lori	0–4	Kilikia	0–4	0–0
Pyunik Football School (Pyunik-2)	1–10	Shirak	1–6	0–4
Banants	4–7	Araks Ararat	3–5	1–2
Dinamo-2000	2–6	Pyunik	0–2	2–4
Malatia Football School	1–7	Mika	1–2	0–5
Kotayk	1–6	Zvartnots-AAL	0–3	1–3

=== Quarter-finals ===
The first legs were played on 22 April 2001. The second legs were played on 27 April 2001.

Team 1	Agg.	Team 2	1st leg	2nd leg
Kilikia	w/o*	Shirak	n/a	n/a
Karabakh	2–4	Ararat Yerevan	0–2	2–2
Pyunik	3–2	Araks Ararat	2–1	1–1
Zvartnots-AAL	2–3	Mika	0–1	2–2

- Shirak was awarded a walkover, as Kilikia did not play out of protest against not having their 1st round league match vs Pyunik (who fielded an ineligible player and were fined) awarded to them

=== Semi-finals ===
The first legs were played on 3 and 4 May 2001. The second legs were played on 12 and 13 May 2001.

Team 1	Agg.	Team 2	1st leg	2nd leg
Shirak	1–3	Ararat Yerevan	1–2	0–1
Mika	4–2	Pyunik	2–1	2–1

=== Final ===
27 May 2001

Mika	1 – 1	Ararat Yerevan
Nikolian 53'		Yesayan 56'
Penalties
	4 – 3

Republican Stadium, Yerevan
Attendance: 7,500

== See also ==
- 2001 Armenian Premier League
