= 2014–15 Armenian Cup =

Tournament details
- Country: Armenia
- Teams: 8

Final positions
- Champions: Pyunik
- Runners-up: Mika

Tournament statistics
- Matches played: 13
- Goals scored: 41 (3.15 per match)

The 2014–15 Armenian Cup was the 24th season of Armenia's football knockout competition. It featured the eight 2014–15 Premier League teams, but no team from the 2014–15 First Division. The tournament began on 1 October 2014, with Pyunik the defending champions, having won their six title the previous season.

== Results ==
=== Quarter-finals ===
All eight Premier League clubs competed in this round. The first legs were played on 17 September and 1 October 2014, while the second legs were played on 20 October and 15 November 2014.

Team 1	Agg.	Team 2	1st leg	2nd leg
Pyunik	4–0	Shirak	3–0	1–0
Ararat Yerevan	3–6	Alashkert	0–2	3–4
Ulisses	3–4	Banants	1–4	2–0
Mika	5–0	Gandzasar	2–0	3–0

=== Semi-finals ===
The four winners from the quarterfinals entered this round. The first legs were played on 18 and 19 March 2015, with the second legs to be competed on 15 and 16 April 2015.

Team 1	Agg.	Team 2	1st leg	2nd leg
Pyunik	3–2	Alashkert	3–1	0–1
Mika	4–3	Banants	1–2	3–1

=== Final ===
6 May 2015
19:00

Mika	1–3	Pyunik
Alex 11' (pen.)	Report	Hakobyan 4', 32'; Romero 36'

Republican Stadium, Yerevan
Attendance: 5,000
Referee: Gianluca Rocchi (Italy)
