= 2003 Armenian Cup =

Tournament details
- Country: Armenia
- Teams: 17

Final positions
- Champions: Mika
- Runners-up: Banants

Tournament statistics
- Matches played: 27
- Goals scored: 83 (3.07 per match)

The 2003 Armenian Cup was the 12th edition of the Armenian Cup, a football competition. In 2003, the tournament had 17 participants, out of which 6 were reserve teams.

== Results ==
=== First round ===
The first legs were played on 15 and 16 March 2003. The second legs were played on 19 and 20 March 2003.

| Team 1 | Agg. | Team 2 | 1st leg | 2nd leg |
|---|---|---|---|---|
| Mika-2 | 1–8 | Pyunik | 0–6 | 1–2 |
| Dinamo FA | 0–16 | Narwhal | 0–10 | 0–6 |
| Banants | 13–0 | Nork Marash | 6–0 | 7–0 |
| Kotayk-2003 | 0–3 | Shirak | 0–2 | 0–1 |
| Kotayk | 5–0 | Pyunik-2 | 4–0 | 1–0 |
| Lokomotiv Yerevan | 1–6 | Dinamo-2000 | 0–6 | 1–0 |
| Araks | 2–3 | Kilikia | 1–1 | 1–2 |
| Spartak Yerevan | w/o | Lernayin Artsakh | n/a | n/a |

=== Quarter-finals ===
The first legs were played on 23 and 24 March 2003. The second legs were played on 6 and 7 April 2003.

| Team 1 | Agg. | Team 2 | 1st leg | 2nd leg |
|---|---|---|---|---|
| Spartak Yerevan | 0–5 | Mika | 0–3 | 0–2 |
| Pyunik | 1–0 | Kotayk | 1–0 | 0–0 |
| Banants | 6–3 | Dinamo-2000 | 4–0 | 2–3 |
| Kilikia | 0–1 | Shirak | 0–1 | 0–0 |

=== Semi-finals ===
The first legs were played on 17 and 18 May 2003. The second legs were played on 22 and 23 May 2003.

| Team 1 | Agg. | Team 2 | 1st leg | 2nd leg |
|---|---|---|---|---|
| Shirak | 0–3 | Mika | 0–0 | 0–3 |
| Banants | 3–2 | Pyunik | 1–1 | 2–1 |

=== Final ===
27 May 2003

| Banants | 0 – 1 | Mika |
|---|---|---|
| | | Petikyan 88' |

Republican Stadium, Yerevan
Attendance: 10,000
Referee: Karen Nalbandyan (Yerevan)

== See also ==
- 2003 Armenian Premier League
