= FC Araks Yerevan =

Home colours	Away colours

FC Araks Yerevan (Armenian: Ֆուտբոլային Ակումբ Արաքս Երևան), is a defunct Armenian football club from the capital Yerevan.

The club was formed during the Soviet period as a labor sports union representing the production unit of the state-owned "ArmElectroMachines" plant.

The club won the Armenian SSR championship in 4 occasions: 1965, 1968 1969 and 1977.

However, the club was dissolved after the independence of Armenia.
