= FC Moush Kasagh =

Moush Kasagh
- Full name: Football Club Moush Kasagh
- Founded: 1998; 27 years ago
- Dissolved: 2000; 25 years ago
- Ground: Kasagh Stadium; Kasagh
- Capacity: 1,000

FC Moush Kasagh (Armenian: Ֆուտբոլային Ակումբ Մուշ Քասաղ) was an Armenian football club from the village of Kasagh, Kotayk Province. The club was formed in 1998 and participated in the Armenian First League during the same season. After spending 2 years in the First League, the club was dissolved prior to the 2000 season kick-off.

== League record ==
Year	Club Name	Division	Position	GP	W	D	L	GS	GA	PTS
1998	Moush Kasagh	Armenian First League	4	24	13	3	8	39	29	42
1999	Moush Kasagh	Armenian First League	9	16	1	2	13	6	42	5
2000–present	Moush Kasagh	No Participation								
