= FC Armenicum =

Armenian football club

FC Armenicum (Armenian: Ֆուտբոլային Ակումբ Արմենիկում), is a defunct Armenian football club from Yerevan. It was founded in 2000 and won the Armenian First League during the same year, gaining promotion to the Armenian Premier League for the 2001 season. However, in 2001, Armenicum was absorbed by FC Pyunik who replaced them in the premier league competition automatically. Hence, Armenicum was dissolved in 2001 and retired from professional football.

== League record ==
Year	Club Name	Division	Position	GP	W	D	L	GS	GA	PTS
2000	Armenicum	Armenian First League	1	16	12	3	1	55	12	39
2001	Armenicum	Armenian Premier League	XX	XX	XX	XX	XX	XX	XX	XX
2001–present	-	no participation	-	-	-	-	-	-	-	-
