= Ulisses FC =

Ulisses
- Full name: Ulisses Football Club
- Founded: 2000; 25 years ago
- Dissolved: 2016; 9 years ago
- Ground: Vazgen Sargsyan Stadium, Yerevan
- Capacity: 14,403
- Owner: Valeri Hovhannisyan
- Chairman: Genrikh Ghazandzhyan
- Manager: Gagik Simonyan
- League: Armenian Premier League
- 2015–16: 8th (last)
- Website: www.fculisses.am
Home colours	Away colours	Third colours

Ulisses Football Club (Armenian: Ուլիս Ֆուտբոլային Ակումբ, romanized: Ulis Futbolayin Akumb, lit. 'Ulysses Football Club'), commonly known as Ulisses, is a defunct Armenian football club from Yerevan. The club played at the Armenian Premier League, the top division in Armenian football. They regularly used the Vazgen Sargsyan Republican Stadium in Yerevan and occasionally the City Stadium in Abovyan as their home ground.

The club headquarters are located on Nalbandyan street 48/1, Yerevan. Like most other Armenian Premier League clubs, Ulisses FC had a reserve team that played in the Armenian First League.

In 2015–16, the club was owned by Armenian businessman Henrikh Ghazandzhyan and sponsored by the "Holiday" Group of Companies.

== History ==
- 2000 – Founded as Dinamo-2000 Yerevan
- 2004 – Changed name to Dinamo-Zenit Yerevan (name change occurred as a result of a new sponsor)
- 2006 – Changed name to Ulisses FC (name change again occurred as a result of a new sponsor)
- 2016 – Dissolved due to both financial and non-financial shortcomings

=== Dinamo-2000 Yerevan ===
The club was founded in 2000 as Dinamo-2000 Yerevan, and made their debut at the 2001 Armenian Premier League season without initially playing in the Armenian First League.

=== Dinamo-Zenit Yerevan ===
In 2004, the club became known as FC Dinamo-Zenit Yerevan and took 5th place in the Armenian Premier League. In 2004 and 2005, 2 reserves teams of the club were represented in the Armenian First League: FC Dinamo-VZ Yerevan and FC Zenit Charentsavan.

=== Ulisses FC ===
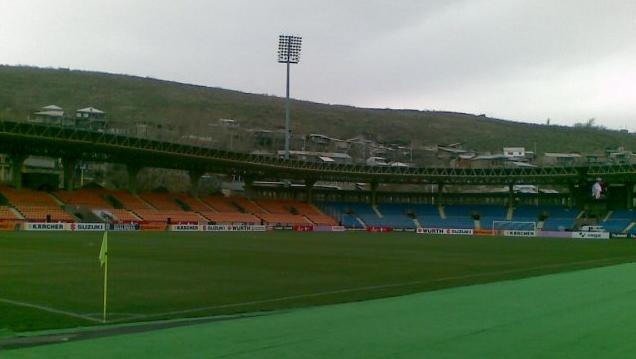
V. Sargsyan Rep. Stadium, the last home stadium used by Ulisses FC

In 2006, the club changed their name with the arrival of new sponsor. they occupied the 8th place at the 2006 Armenian Premier League season grabbing the chance to save their place in the top league in a decisive match with FC Dinamo Yerevan. Winning the game, Ulisses FC secured their place in the top tier for the next season. In seasons 2007 and 2008 team play was much better, and there was no need of survival games.

At the beginning of 2008, the club's department was enlarged with the Shengavit football school of Yerevan, while the Vardanank-451 Stadium of Voskehat became the training base of the club.

In 2007, they played their home games in the Kasaghi Marzik Stadium in Ashtarak. In 2009, they moved to the Mika Stadium in Yerevan.

In 2011, Ulisses FC won the Armenian championship for the first time in club history, and ended Pyunik dominance of 10 consecutive championships.

On 3 February 2016, the club declared that it will not participate in the second half of the 2015-16 Armenian Premier League season.

=== League and cup history ===
Season	League									Armenian Cup	Top goalscorer		Managers
Season	Div.	Pos.	Pl.	W	D	L	GS	GA	P	Armenian Cup	Name	League	Managers
2001	1st	9th	22	4	4	14	18	48	16	First round			
2002	1st	10th	22	3	3	16	19	63	12	Quarterfinal			
2003	1st	6th	28	5	4	19	18	69	19	Quarterfinal			
2004	1st	5th	20	2	2	16	12	41	8	Quarterfinal			
2005	1st	6th	28	7	6	15	23	51	27	First round			
2006	1st	8th	28	5	2	21	31	66	17	-			
2007	1st	7th	28	8	6	14	21	46	30	Quarterfinal			
2008	1st	6th	28	7	8	13	19	29	29	Quarterfinal			
2009	1st	3rd	28	16	5	7	47	25	53	Semifinal	(Armenia) Artur Kocharyan	15	
2010	1st	3rd	28	17	4	7	44	23	55	Semifinal			
2011	1st	1st	28	15	8	5	38	22	53	Semifinal	(Georgia (country)) Giorgi Krasovski	8	
2012–13	1st	6th	42	11	12	19	41	50	45	Semifinal; Quarterfinal	(Armenia) Arsen Balabekyan	10	
2013–14	1st	7th	28	7	4	17	21	46	25	Quarterfinal			
2014–15	1st	2nd	28	15	5	8	43	32	50	Quarterfinal	(Armenia) Hovhannes Goharyan	9	
2015–16	1st	8th	28	0	2	26	8	76	2	Quarterfinal	(Serbia) Milutin Ivanović	2	

=== European history ===
As of match played 9 July 2015

Competition	Pld	W	D	L	GF	GA
UEFA Champions League	2	0	0	2	0	2
UEFA Europa League	6	0	2	4	1	9
**Total**	**8**	**0**	**2**	**6**	**1**	**11**

Season	Competition	Round	Club	Home	Away	Aggregate
2010–11	UEFA Europa League	1Q	(Israel) Bnei Yehuda Tel Aviv	0–0	0–1	**0–1**
2011–12	UEFA Europa League	1Q	(Hungary) Ferencvárosi	0–2	0–3	**0–5**
2012–13	UEFA Champions League	2Q	(Moldova) Sheriff Tiraspol	0–1	0–1	**0–2**
2015–16	UEFA Europa League	1Q	(Malta) Birkirkara	1–3	0–0	**1–3**

- Home results are noted in **bold**

== Honours ==
- Armenian Premier League:
  - Champions (1): 2011
  - Runners-up (1): 2014–15

== Last squad ==
As of 30 September 2015

Note: Flags indicate national team as defined under FIFA eligibility rules; some limited exceptions apply. Players may hold more than one non-FIFA nationality.

No.	Pos.	Nation	Player
2	DF	ARM	Karen Avetisyan
3	DF	ARM	Garnik Movsisyan
4	DF	ARM	Hayk Hunanyan
5	DF	ARM	Melik Sardaryan
7	FW	ARM	Vigen Avetsiyan
8	MF	ARM	Erik Sargsyan
9	MF	ARM	Mikhayel Arustamyan
10	FW	ARM	Orbeli Hambardzumyan
11	MF	ARM	Artur Hakobyan
12	MF	ARM	Arman Tutyan
13	MF	ARM	Vardges Vardanyan
14	MF	ARM	Narek Davtyan

No.	Pos.	Nation	Player
15	MF	ARM	Tatul Davtyan
19	FW	ARM	Mher Harutyunyan
20	GK	ARM	Vahe Andreasyan
21	FW	ARM	Narek Makoyan
22	FW	ARM	Narek Papoyan
24	DF	ARM	Artak Andrikyan (captain)
28	MF	ARM	Aleksandr Hovhannisyan
30	GK	ARM	Tigran Davtyan
88	GK	ARM	Papin Tevosyan
—	DF	ARM	Artashes Arakelyan
—	MF	ARM	Narek Gyozalyan
—	FW	ARM	Edgar Harutyunyan

== Ulisses FC-2 (reserves) ==
The Ulisses FC reserve squad played as Ulisses FC-2 in the Armenian First League. They played their home games at the Kasakhi Marzik Stadium in the town of Ashtarak.

As of 1 August 2015

Note: Flags indicate national team as defined under FIFA eligibility rules; some limited exceptions apply. Players may hold more than one non-FIFA nationality.

No.	Pos.	Nation	Player
—	GK	ARM	Vahe Andreasyan
—	GK	ARM	Tigran Davtyan
—	DF	ARM	Garnik Movsesyan
—	DF	ARM	Narek Makoyan
—	DF	ARM	Narek Hovnanyan
—	MF	ARM	Narek Papoyan
—	MF	ARM	Artur Hakobyan

No.	Pos.	Nation	Player
—	MF	ARM	Harutyun Ghazaryan
—	MF	ARM	Ishkhan Yeghiazaryan
—	MF	ARM	Vardges Vardanyan
—	FW	ARM	Tatul Davtyan
—	FW	ARM	Mikayel Arustamyan
—	FW	ARM	Samvel Hovhannisyan

Manager: Ara Azaryan

== Managers ==
- (Armenia) Vagharshak Aslanyan (2000–01)
- (Armenia) Albert Sarkisyan (2002)
- (Armenia) Vachagan Khachataryan (2002)
- (Armenia) Alesha Antonyan (2002–03)
- (Armenia) Ashot Kirakosyan (2004–05)
- (Armenia) Sevada Arzumanyan (July 1, 2005 – June 30, 2006)
- (Armenia) Arsen Chilingaryan (2006–07)
- (Armenia) Souren Barseghyan (2007–08)
- (Armenia) Sevada Arzumanyan (2008–Sept 7, 2012)
- (Armenia) Karen Barseghyan (Sept 8, 2012–July 24, 2014)
- (Armenia) Suren Chakhalyan (July 25, 2014–Oct 6, 2014)
- (Armenia) Gagik Simonyan (interim) (Oct 6, 2014–Feb 28, 2015)
- (Russia) Fyodor Shcherbachenko (Feb 28, 2015–Apr 17, 2015)
- (Armenia) Suren Chakhalyan (April 18, 2015–Sep 1, 2015)
- (Armenia) Gagik Simonyan (interim) (Sep 1, 2015–Feb 3, 2016)
