= Armenian First League =

Second tier of the Armenian league

- Founded: 1992; 34 years ago
- Country: Armenia
- Number of clubs: 16
- Level on pyramid: 2
- Promotion to: Armenian Premier League
- Relegation to: Armenian Amateur A-League
- Domestic cup: Armenian Independence Cup
- Current champions: Sardarapat FC (1st title) (2025–26)
- Website: ffa.am
- Current: 2025–26 Armenian First League

The Armenian First League (Armenian: Հայաստանի Առաջին լիգա, romanized: Hayastani Arrajin liga) is currently the second level football competition in Armenia after the Armenian Premier League. The competition exists mostly out of reserve teams of several Premier League clubs; however, other teams also participate. The reserve teams are not eligible for promotion to the highest level, resulting in situations where a club promotes even when they finish the season in a mid-table position.

== 2025–26 Member clubs ==
Club	Location	Stadium	Capacity
Ararat-Armenia-2	Yerevan	Yerevan Football Academy Stadium	1,428
Andranik	Yerevan (Shengavit)	Sevan City Stadium	500
Ararat-Yerevan-2	Yerevan	Vazgen Sargsyan Republican Stadium	14,403
Bentonit	Yerevan	Lori Stadium	4,000
BKMA Yerevan-2	Yerevan	Yerevan Football Academy Stadium	1,428
Lernayin Artsakh	Goris	Stepanakert Republican Stadium	15,000
Mika	Yerevan	Mika Stadium	7,000
Nikarm	Vanadzor	Vanadzor City Stadium	3,000
Noah-2	Yerevan	Nairi Stadium	6,850
Pyunik Academy	Yerevan	Vazgen Sargsyan Republican Stadium	14,403
Shirak-2	Gyumri	Gyumri City Stadium	4,000
Syunik	Kapan	Gandzasar Stadium	3,500
Urartu-2	Yerevan	Urartu Stadium	4,860

== Winners ==
Year	Winner	Runner-up
1992	Ararat Ararat	Aragats
1993	Zangezour	Artashat
1993	Lori Vanadzor	Aznavour
1994	Aragats	Kasagh
1995	transitional season (no winner)	
1995–96	Arabkir	BKMA Yerevan
1996–97	Dvin Artashat	Lori Vanadzor
1997	Aragats	Spitak
1998	Zvartnots-AAL	Lori
1999	Dinamo Yerevan	Mika-Kasagh
2000	Armenicum	Karabakh
2001	Malatia	FIMA Yerevan
2002	Armavir	FC Araks
2003	Kilikia	Vagharshapat
2004	Pyunik-2	Lernayin Artsakh
2005	Pyunik-2	Ararat Yerevan
2006	Pyunik-2	Lernayin Artsakh
2007	Pyunik-2	Mika-2
2008	Shengavit (Ulisses-2)	Pyunik-2
2009	Impulse	Shengavit (Ulisses-2)
2010	Ararat Yerevan	Banants-2
2011	Shengavit (Ulisses-2)	Mika-2
2012–13	Alashkert	Pyunik-2
2013–14	Banants-2	Alashkert-2
2014–15	Alashkert-2	Banants-2
2015–16	Alashkert-2	Mika-2
2016–17	Banants-2	Pyunik-2
2017–18	Lori	Artsakh
2018–19	Junior Sevan	Yerevan
2019–20	Van	Lokomotiv Yerevan
2020–21	Sevan	BKMA
2021–22	Lernayin Artsakh	Shirak
2022–23	West Armenia	BKMA-2
2023–24	Gandzasar Kapan	Syunik
2024–25	BKMA-2	Syunik
2025–26	Sardarapat	BKMA-2

== See also ==
- Football Federation of Armenia
- Football in Armenia
- Sports in Armenia
