= Arman Karamyan =

Armenian footballer (born 1979)

Personal information
- Date of birth: 14 November 1979 (age 46)
- Place of birth: Yerevan, Armenian SSR, Soviet Union (now Armenia)
- Height: 1.75 m (5 ft 9 in)
- Positions: Striker; left winger

Senior career*
Years	Team	Apps	(Gls)
1996–1997	Arabkir Yerevan	7	(4)
1997–1998	Pyunik Yerevan	23	(4)
1999–2000	Kilikia Yerevan	54	(35)
2001–2002	Pyunik Yerevan	41	(57)
2003	Panachaiki Patras	15	(0)
2003–2004	Arsenal Kyiv	10	(1)
2004–2006	Rapid București	6	(0)
2005	→ FC Brașov (loan)	9	(2)
2005	→ Gloria Bistriţa (loan)	6	(0)
2006	→ Braşov (loan)	10	(10)
2006–2007	Ceahlăul Piatra Neamţ	13	(0)
2007–2010	Politehnica Timişoara	50	(16)
2010	Steaua București	13	(5)
2010–2011	Unirea Urziceni	5	(0)
2012–2014	CS Buftea	41	(22)
2016	Voința Crevedia	18	(9)
Total		321	(165)

International career
2000–2010	Armenia	48	(5)
- * Club domestic league appearances and goals

Arman Karamyan (Armenian: Արման Քարամյան; born 14 November 1979) is an Armenian retired professional footballer who played as a striker and left winger. He made 48 appearances the Armenia national team, scoring 5 goals. Arman is the twin brother of fellow football player Artavazd Karamyan.

== Club career ==
=== Arabkir ===
Arman Karamyan began playing football as a senior in 1996. That year, both he and his older brother Artavazd Karamyan joined Arabkir.

=== Pyunik Yerevan ===
In 1997, they both made their way to Pyunik Yerevan. Arman was a part of Pyunik when they won the Armenian Premier League in 2001 and 2002, the Armenian Cup in 2002 and Armenian Supercup in 1997 and 2002.

=== Kilikia Yerevan and return to Pyunik Yerevan ===
Both brothers moved to Kilikia Yerevan in 1999 and back to Pyunik in 2001.

=== Panachaiki Patras ===
They both joined the Football League (Greece) in 2003 when they both signed with Panachaiki.

=== Arsenal Kyiv ===
From 2003 to 2004, they both played in Ukrainian Premier League club Arsenal Kyiv.

=== Rapid București ===
Arman and Artavazd both joined Liga I club Rapid București in 2004. While Arman left that season, Artavazd would remain in the club for a number of seasons.

=== Loans to Braşov and Gloria Bistriţa ===
Arman was loaned to other Liga I clubs Braşov and Gloria Bistriţa for the 2005 season.

=== Second loan to Braşov ===
He was loaned to Braşov again at the start of the 2006 season.

=== Ceahlăul Piatra Neamţ ===
Arman than officially signed with Ceahlăul Piatra Neamţ.

=== Politehnica Timişoara ===
Both Arman and Artavazd reunited in the club Politehnica Timişoara in 2007. The next season, the club was a finalist in the 2008–09 Liga I championship.

=== Steaua București ===
The Karamyan brothers moved to Steaua București in 2010. In the 2009–10 season, Arman was selected as the left winger of the year. After finishing Liga I for the 2009–10 season, the brothers ended their contracts with Steaua București. A search began to find the club they would both continue playing football in. But the process of finding a new club was delayed. Later, it was reported that the brothers were in talks with Braşov. However, the head coach of Braşov Daniel Isăilă later stated that the transition of the Karmanyans was unlikely to be completed because of the complexity of the negotiations, which reached a standstill. Talks were later made for the brothers to play for Astra Giurgiu, coached by Mihai Stoichiță. But after Stoichiță departed from the club, the talks ended. According to an edition of TotalFootball, because of the long search for a new team, the financial conditions for the Karamyan brothers increased to that of a required minimum of 10,000 euros per month. The option that both players finish their playing careers and enter into coaching activities was considered.

=== Unirea Urziceni ===
In mid-September 2010, the search was over for the Karamyan brothers. The football players signed a contract with and officially moved into Unirea Urziceni. Near the end of a match, Arman made his debut for the club coming on as a substitute in the 81st minute of the game.

In late October 2011, Stoichiță, who knew firsthand the playing abilities of both brothers, invited them to his current team Mioveni. However, Artavazd decided to retire as a player and go into business.

=== Buftea ===
A year later, Artavazd resumed his career and he and Arman both joined the Liga II club Buftea. In their first meeting, Artavazd scored twice. Arman also scored a goal in their second match.

== International career ==
Karamyan was a member of the Armenia national team and had participated in 49 international matches and scored 5 goals since his debut in an away friendly match against Guatemala on 9 January 2000 ending 1–1. In 2010, he left the national team.

== Personal life ==
He and his brother Artavazd Karamyan were both football players and have spent nearly their entire careers playing for the same teams.

At the end 2014 he took the Romanian citizenship, together with his brother. They are living in Romania with their children and wives.

== Career statistics ==
Appearances and goals by national team and year
National team	Year	Apps	Goals
Armenia	2000	8	1
Armenia	2001	4	0
Armenia	2002	3	1
Armenia	2003	7	1
Armenia	2004	5	2
Armenia	2005	3	0
Armenia	2006	3	0
Armenia	2007	5	0
Armenia	2008	3	0
Armenia	2009	6	0
Armenia	2010	1	0
Total		48	5

Scores and results list Armenia's goal tally first, score column indicates score after each Karamyan goal.

List of international goals scored by Arman Karamyan
No.	Date	Venue	Opponent	Score	Result	Competition	Ref.
1	4 February 2000	GSP Stadium, Strovolos, Cyprus	Cyprus	2–2	2–3	Friendly	
2	7 June 2002	Estadi Comunal d'Andorra la Vella, Andorra la Vella, Andorra	Andorra	2–0	2–0	Friendly	
3	10 September 2003	Windsor Park, Belfast, Northern Ireland	Northern Ireland	1–0	1–0	UEFA Euro 2004 qualifying	
4	19 February 2004	Stelios Kyriakides Stadium, Paphos, Greece	Kazakhstan	3–3	3–3	Friendly	
5	21 February 2004	Makario Stadium, Nicosia, Cyprus	Georgia	1–0	2–0	Friendly	

== Honours ==
Kilikia Yerevan

- Armenian Supercup: 1997

Pyunik Yerevan

- Armenian Premier League: 2001, 2002
- Armenian Cup: 2002
- Armenian Supercup: 2002

Politehnica Timişoara

- Liga I runner-up: 2008–09
- Cupa României runner-up: 2008–09

Individual

- Armenian Footballer of the Year: 2002
- Armenian Premier League top goalscorer: 2001 (21 goals), 2002 (36 goals)
