= FC Pyunik =

Armenian sports club

Pyunik
- Full name: Football Club Pyunik
- Nickname: Նռնագույններ (Pomegranate Color)
- Founded: 20 January 1992; 34 years ago
- Ground: Vazgen Sargsyan Republican Stadium
- Capacity: 14,403
- Coordinates: 40°10′19″N 44°31′33″E
- Owner: Anton Farber
- Director General: Suren Baghdasaryan
- Head coach: Dmitri Gunko
- League: Armenian Premier League
- 2025–26: Armenian Premier League, 3rd of 10
- Website: fcpyunik.am
Home colours	Away colours

Football Club Pyunik (Armenian: Փյունիկ Ֆուտբոլային ակումբ), commonly known as Pyunik (lit. 'Phoenix'), is an Armenian professional sports club based in the Kentron neighbourhood of Yerevan. Pyunik is mostly known for its professional football team which, since its creation in 1992, has always played in the Armenian Premier League, becoming the most successful team of Armenia in number of official titles, with 34 won to date.

Pyunik is also known to be one of the most popular football clubs in Armenia, along with Urartu, Shirak and Ararat.

Pyunik has always had a fierce rivalry with Ararat, as both clubs are considered to be the most successful clubs in Armenia, the latter due to its Soviet accomplishments. Both clubs are also the two most popular in the country and favorites within the Armenian Diaspora. Pyunik also shares a rivalry with Urartu which began when Urartu relocated from Abovyan to Yerevan in 2001, and became the third largest team in the city. The Pyunik-Urartu rivalry is seen as one of the biggest clashes in Armenian football.

Pyunik's home stadium is the Vazgen Sargsyan Republican Stadium, which is also home to the Armenia national football team. The youth academy has produced many Armenian internationals such as Henrikh Mkhitaryan, Robert Arzumanyan, Karlen Mkrtchyan, Edgar Manucharyan, Varazdat Haroyan and Gevorg Ghazaryan, many who have played or are playing for top European clubs.

== International History ==
Internationally, Pyunik has yet to win an international title, with the closest result being a bronze place finish in the 2006 Commonwealth of Independent States Cup. Pyunik's domestic success usually qualifies the team for UEFA Champions League and UEFA Europa League qualifying rounds.

== History ==
Pyunik was founded in 1992 by Armenian football legend Khoren Oganesian and originally named Homenetmen Yerevan. The club won the first Armenian Premier League competition held in 1992 which it shared with Shirak since both teams were tied on points. In 1995, Homenetmen Yerevan was renamed FC Pyunik (Armenian for "Phoenix"). Following the change of name, Pyunik went on to win the 1995–96 Armenian Premier League and end the season with a 59-match unbeaten streak.

In 1996, Pyunik played its first international cup match, a UEFA Europa League qualifying match against Finnish club HJK Helsinki which Pyunik won 3–1. Pyunik also won the 1996-97 Armenian Premier League securing itself another chance at qualifying for an international cup playoffs the following year.

In 1997, Pyunik played its first UEFA Champions League qualifying match against Hungarian side MTK Budapest FC yet failed to qualify for the playoffs following a 6–3 defeat on aggregate.

1998 proved to be a crucial year for the club following the loss of its main source of funding and the subsequent departure of its main players. Pyunik finished 6th that season and withdrew from football altogether.

Pyunik secured a comeback to professional football following its absorption of FC Armenicum, a newly promoted team to the Armenian Premier League. The club's new management sought to bring more experience to the club and reinforced the squad with foreign players from Argentina, Cameroon, Mali and Romania. The reinforcements brought positive results and Pyunik went on to win the 2001 Armenian Premier League and 2002 Armenian Cup.

2002 saw Pyunik advance to the second round of the UEFA Champions League qualifying round after beating Finnish champions Tampere United 6–0 on aggregate. From 2002 forwards, Pyunik went on to win the Armenian Premier League a record of 10 times in a row, from 2001 to 2010.

On 8 January 2020, former Armenian international goalkeeper Roman Berezovsky was announced as the club's new manager. Just over 7-months later, 13 July 2020, Berezovsky left the club by mutual consent. On 20 July 2020, Artak Oseyan was announced as Pyunik's new manager, but left his role as head coach on 13 December 2020. On 7 January 2021, Yegishe Melikyan was announced as Pyunik's new manager.

In the 2022/23 season, after victories over Cluj and Dudelange, Pyunik became the first ever Armenian club to reach the third round of Champions League qualifying, where they played against former European Champions Crvena Zvezda, losing 7–0 on aggregate.

Subsequently, Pyunik dropped into the play-off round of the Europa League, where they played against the Moldovan side Sheriff Tiraspol. After two scoreless draws, Pyunik lost on penalties, thus dropping into the group stages of the Conference League, the first ever group stage appearance in a European competition for the club.

After a defeat away against Basel on the first matchday, Pyunik faced Slovan Bratislava in their first home match in Yerevan, which they won thanks to goals from Artak Dashyan and Yusuf Otubanjo. This result meant that they became the first ever Armenian team to win a game in UEFA group stage competitions.

On 31 December 2024, Pyunik released a statement stating that ownership of the club had passed from Artur Soghomonyan to Anton Farber.

=== Domestic history ===
Season	League									Armenian Cup	Top goalscorer		Manager
Season	Div.	Pos.	Pl.	W	D	L	GS	GA	P	Armenian Cup	Name	League	Manager
1992	Armenian Premier League	1st	22	17	3	2	75	31	37	Runner-Up	Poghos Galstyan	26	
1993	Armenian Premier League	4th	28	21	3	4	80	29	45	Semi-final	Gegham Hovhannisyan	26	
1994	Armenian Premier League	2nd	28	23	1	4	113	24	47	Semi-final	Arsen Avetisyan	39	
1995	Armenian Premier League	2nd^{1}	10	5	4	1	31	8	19	Quarter-final	Arsen Avetisyan	12	
1995–96	Armenian Premier League	1st	22	19	3	0	71	14	60	Winner			
1996–97	Armenian Premier League	1st	22	19	2	1	67	9	59	Runner-Up	Arsen Avetisyan	24	
1997	Armenian Premier League	4th	18	11	2	5	42	16	35	Runner-Up	Varazdat Avetisyan	10	
1998	Armenian Premier League	6th	26	6	3	17	27	68	21	Semi-final			
1999	Club did not participate.												
2000	Club did not participate.												
2001	Armenian Premier League	1st	22	17	2	3	77	23	53	Semi-final	Arman Karamyan	21	(Armenia) Samvel Darbinyan
2002	Armenian Premier League	1st	22	19	2	1	85	14	59	Winner	Arman Karamyan	36	
2003	Armenian Premier League	1st	28	23	5	0	87	11	74	Semi-final	Galust Petrosyan	12	
2004	Armenian Premier League	1st	28	22	5	1	89	25	71	Winner	Edgar Manucharyan; Galust Petrosyan	21	
2005	Armenian Premier League	1st	20	11	6	3	35	15	39	Quarter-final	Tigran Davtyan	9	
2006	Armenian Premier League	1st	28	23	4	1	86	23	73	Runner-Up	Arsen Avetisyan	15	
2007	Armenian Premier League	1st	28	18	3	7	58	22	57	Semi-final	Henrikh Mkhitaryan	12	
2008	Armenian Premier League	1st^{2}	28	18	5	5	40	18	59	Semi-final	Albert Tadevosyan	10	
2009	Armenian Premier League	1st	28	20	5	3	64	13	65	Winner	Henrikh Mkhitaryan	11	
2010	Armenian Premier League	1st	28	20	5	3	73	22	65	Winner	Gevorg Ghazaryan; Marcos Pizzelli	16	
2011	Armenian Premier League	3rd	28	12	10	6	33	28	46	Quarter-final	Edgar Manucharyan	8	
2011–12	Armenian Premier League	Only Cup competition was held								Quarter-final			
2012–13	Armenian Premier League	4th	42	19	6	17	67	51	63	Winner	Viulen Ayvazyan	11	
2013–14	Armenian Premier League	6th	28	8	8	12	41	39	32	Winner	Sarkis Baloyan	10	
2014–15	Armenian Premier League	1st	28	19	4	5	58	26	61	Winner	César Romero	21	
2015–16	Armenian Premier League	3rd	28	13	9	6	44	21	48	Quarter-final	Vardan Pogosyan	9	
2016–17	Armenian Premier League	4th	30	12	9	9	35	27	45	Runner-Up	Alik Arakelyan	6	(Armenia) Sargis Hovsepyan (Armenia) Artak Oseyan
2017–18	Armenian Premier League	5th	30	9	9	12	37	41	36	Quarter-final	Alik Arakelyan	7	(Armenia) Armen Gyulbudaghyants (Russia) Aleksei Yeryomenko (Armenia) Armen Gyulbudaghyants
2018–19	Armenian Premier League	2nd	32	18	6	8	46	32	60	Quarter-final	Erik Vardanyan	8	(Russia) Andrei Talalayev (Russia) Aleksandr Tarkhanov
2019–20	Armenian Premier League	8th	22	8	2	12	39	42	26	Second Round	Denis Mahmudov	9	(Russia) Aleksandr Tarkhanov (Armenia) Suren Chakhalyan (Caretaker) (Armenia) Roman Berezovsky
2020–21	Armenian Premier League	7th	24	6	7	11	20	18	25	First Round	José Caraballo	3	(Armenia) Artak Oseyan (Armenia) Yegishe Melikyan
2021–22	Armenian Premier League	1st	32	23	6	3	52	25	75	Quarterfinal	Hugo Firmino	16	(Armenia) Yegishe Melikyan
2022–23	Armenian Premier League	2nd	36	25	5	6	72	23	80	Semifinal	Luka Juričić; Yusuf Otubanjo	17	(Armenia) Yegishe Melikyan
2023–24	Armenian Premier League	1st	36	24	10	2	84	28	82	Semifinal	Yusuf Otubanjo	21	(Armenia) Yegishe Melikyan
2024–25	Armenian Premier League	4th	30	17	2	11	59	37	53	Semifinal	Yusuf Otubanjo	14	(Armenia) Yegishe Melikyan
2025–26	Armenian Premier League	3rd	27	17	4	6	37	18	55	Quarterfinal	Marius Noubissi; Momo Yansané	7	(Armenia) Yegishe Melikyan (Armenia) Artak Oseyan

- Due to the 1995 season being a transitional season, there was no official winner of championship.
- Championship was decided by a decision game.

=== European history ===
As of match played 16 July 2026

Competition	GP	W	D	L	GF	GA	±
UEFA Champions League	42	9	10	23	36	69	–33
UEFA Europa League / UEFA Cup	28	9	7	12	27	48	–21
UEFA Conference League	26	14	1	11	37	30	+7
Total	96	32	18	46	100	147	−47

Season	Competition	Round	Club	Home	Away	Aggregate
1996–97	UEFA Cup	QR	(Finland) HJK Helsinki	3–1	2–5 (aet)	5–6
1997–98	UEFA Champions League	1Q	(Hungary) MTK Budapest	0–2	3–4	3–6
2002–03	UEFA Champions League	1Q	(Finland) Tampere United	2–0	4–0	6–0
2002–03	UEFA Champions League	2Q	(Ukraine) Dynamo Kyiv	2–2	0–4	2–6
2003–04	UEFA Champions League	1Q	(Iceland) KR Reykjavík	1–0	1–1	2–1
2003–04	UEFA Champions League	2Q	(Bulgaria) CSKA Sofia	0–2	0–1	0–3
2004–05	UEFA Champions League	1Q	(North Macedonia) Pobeda Prilep	1–1	3–1	4–2
2004–05	UEFA Champions League	2Q	(Ukraine) Shakhtar Donetsk	1–3	0–1	1–4
2005–06	UEFA Champions League	1Q	(Finland) Haka Valkeakoski	2–2	0–1	2–3
2006–07	UEFA Champions League	1Q	(Moldova) Sheriff Tiraspol	0–0	0–2	0–2
2007–08	UEFA Champions League	1Q	(Republic of Ireland) Derry City	2–0	0–0	2–0
2007–08	UEFA Champions League	2Q	(Ukraine) Shakhtar Donetsk	0–2	1–2	1–4
2008–09	UEFA Champions League	1Q	(Cyprus) Anorthosis Famagusta	0–2	0–1	0–3
2009–10	UEFA Champions League	2Q	(Croatia) Dinamo Zagreb	0–0	0–3	0–3
2010–11	UEFA Champions League	2Q	(Serbia) Partizan Belgrade	0–1	1–3	1–4
2011–12	UEFA Champions League	2Q	(Czech Republic) Viktoria Plzeň	0–4	1–5	1–9
2012–13	UEFA Europa League	1Q	(Montenegro) Zeta Golubovci	0–3	2–1	2–4
2013–14	UEFA Europa League	1Q	(North Macedonia) Teteks Tetovo	1–0	1–1	2–1
2013–14	UEFA Europa League	2Q	(Lithuania) Žalgiris Vilnius	1–1	0–2	1–3
2014–15	UEFA Europa League	1Q	(Kazakhstan) Astana	1–4	0–2	1–6
2015–16	UEFA Champions League	1Q	(San Marino) Folgore	2–1	2–1	4–2
2015–16	UEFA Champions League	2Q	(Norway) Molde	1–0	0–5	1–5
2016–17	UEFA Europa League	1Q	(Gibraltar) Europa FC	2–1	0–2	2–3
2017–18	UEFA Europa League	1Q	(Slovakia) Slovan Bratislava	1–4	0–5	1–9
2018–19	UEFA Europa League	1Q	(North Macedonia) Vardar	1–0	2–0	3–0
2018–19	UEFA Europa League	2Q	(Kazakhstan) Tobol	1–0	1–2	2–2 (a)
2018–19	UEFA Europa League	3Q	(Israel) Maccabi Tel Aviv	0–0	1–2	1–2
2019–20	UEFA Europa League	1Q	(North Macedonia) Shkupi	3–3	2–1	5–4
2019–20	UEFA Europa League	2Q	(Czech Republic) Jablonec	2–1	0–0	2–1
2019–20	UEFA Europa League	3Q	(England) Wolverhampton Wanderers	0–4	0–4	0–8
2022–23	UEFA Champions League	1Q	(Romania) CFR Cluj	0–0	2–2 (aet)	2–2 (4–3 p)
2022–23	UEFA Champions League	2Q	(Luxembourg) F91 Dudelange	0–1	4−1	4−2
2022–23	UEFA Champions League	3Q	(Serbia) Red Star Belgrade	0–2	0–5	0–7
2022–23	UEFA Europa League	PO	(Moldova) Sheriff Tiraspol	0–0	0–0	0–0 (2–3 p)
2022–23	UEFA Europa Conference League	Group H	(Switzerland) Basel	1–2	1–3	3rd
2022–23	UEFA Europa Conference League	Group H	(Slovakia) Slovan Bratislava	2−0	1–2	3rd
2022–23	UEFA Europa Conference League	Group H	(Lithuania) Žalgiris	2−0	1–2	3rd
2023–24	UEFA Europa Conference League	1Q	(Estonia) Narva Trans	2−0	3−0	5−0
2023–24	UEFA Europa Conference League	2Q	(Sweden) Kalmar FF	2−1	2−1	4−2
2023–24	UEFA Europa Conference League	3Q	(Norway) Bodø/Glimt	0–3	0–3	0–6
2024–25	UEFA Champions League	1Q	(Belarus) Dinamo Minsk	0–1	0–0	0–1
2024–25	UEFA Conference League	2Q	(North Macedonia) Struga	3–1	1–2	4–3
2024–25	UEFA Conference League	3Q	(Kazakhstan) Ordabasy	1−0	1−0	2−0
2024–25	UEFA Conference League	PO	(Slovenia) Celje	1−0	1–4	2–4
2025–26	UEFA Conference League	1Q	(San Marino) Tre Fiori	5−0	0–1	5−1
2025–26	UEFA Conference League	2Q	(Hungary) Győr	2−1	1–3	3–4
2026–27	UEFA Conference League	1Q	(Malta) Marsaxlokk	1−0	3−0	4–0
2026–27	UEFA Conference League	2Q	(Hungary) Debreceni	0–0	0–1	0−1

== Kit and badge ==
Throughout the seasons, Pyunik has predominantly worn blue and white jerseys, with a few exceptions including Pyunik's first jerseys which were orange.

Puma is the club's current kit supplier since 2019.

On 3 August 2020, Pyunik announced that Joma would be supplying the team's kit for the 2020–21 season.

=== Kit suppliers and shirt sponsors ===
Period	Kit Manufacturer	Shirt Sponsors
1992–95		
1995–98	Erima	
2001–02	Erima/Diadora	
2002–03	Holani	
2003–04	Puma	
2004–05	Holani	
2005–09	Hummel	Complex
2010–13	Hummel	Armenian Development Bank
2014–17	Nike	Armenian Development Bank
2017–18	Nike	Gold's Gym
2018–19	Umbro	Gold's Gym
2019–20	Puma	TotoGaming
2020–2022	Joma	Vbet
2022–2026	Joma	Fastex
2026–	Jogël	Fastbank

=== Badge ===
The club has had five different designs for its badge during its history, with the first three designs being significantly different from each other. Following the club's reappearance in 2001, Pyunik introduced its iconic logo design which included a bold letter P placed on top of a football. The club kept this design for 13 years before introducing a double-headed golden phoenix crest in 2014. This change resulted unpopular among the fans and Pyunik introduced a new badge in 2019, this time returning to its original round shape with a predominantly blue logo and a red phoenix in the center.

2014–18

2019–2026

== Stadium ==
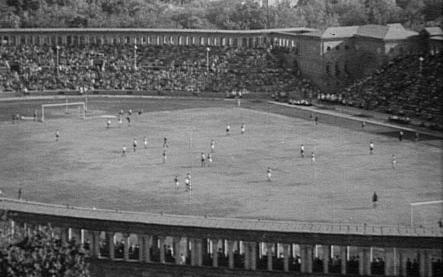
The stadium during Soviet era

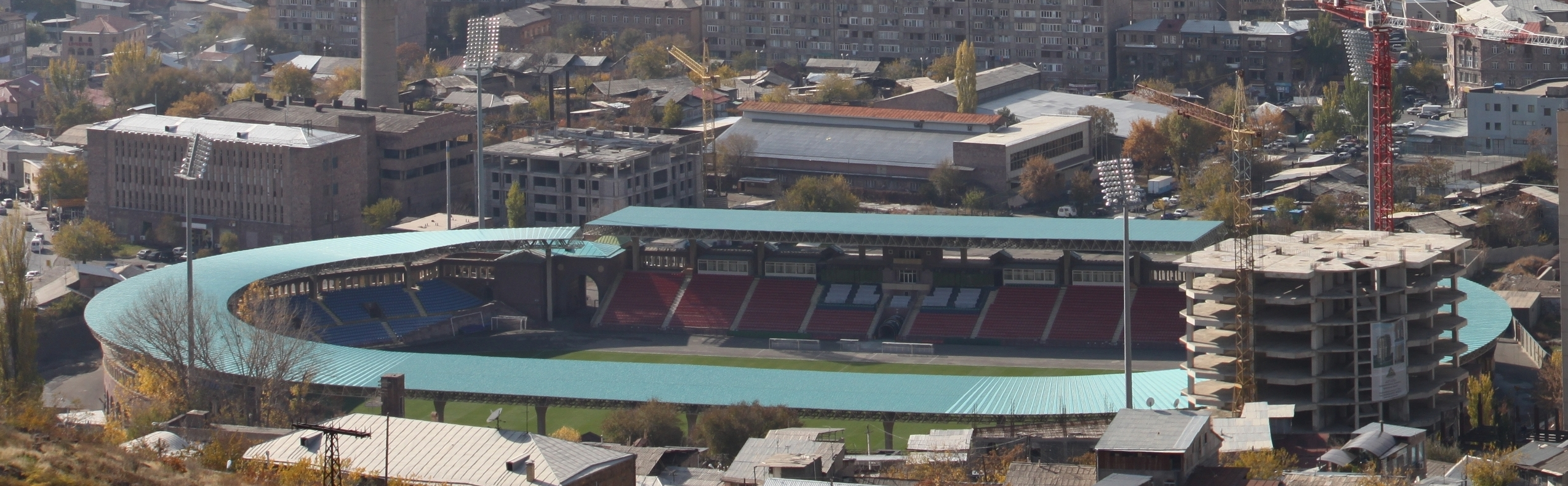
Stadium view

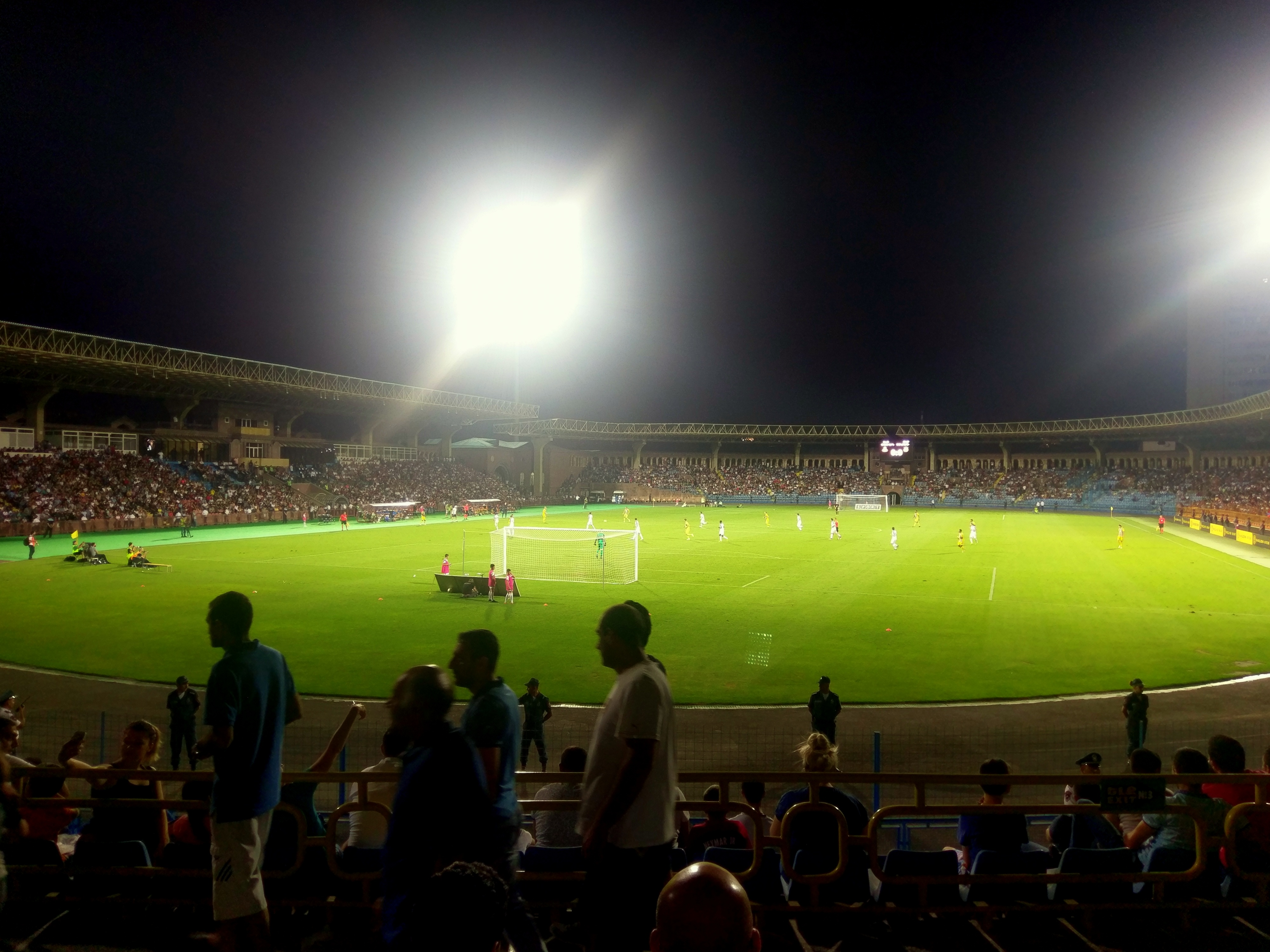
The stadium during a Champions League qualifying match

Pyunik used several locations throughout its history. Between 1992 and 1998, Pyunik played at Hrazdan Stadium, Armenia's largest stadium with a capacity for 54,208 spectators.

In 2001, following the renovations works done at the Republican Stadium two years before, Pyunik relocated and played all its home matches there until 2013, with a brief interruption in 2008, when the club was forced to play at Pyunik Stadium; its training ground, due to renovation works at the Republican Stadium.

Between 2013 and 2017, the Yerevan Football Academy served as a home venue for all domestic competitions, while still using the Republican Stadium for international fixtures. At the beginning of 2017–18 Armenian Premier League season, Pyunik used the Republican Stadium as a home venue during the first half of the season, and eventually returning to their own Pyunik Stadium during the second half.

The Republican Stadium is also the home of the Armenia national football team, and is sometimes used by other Armenian teams for their international cup fixtures.

The club is currently planning on building an all-seater 5,000 capacity stadium by 2022.

=== List of stadiums used by the club ===
- Hrazdan Stadium: 1992–98
- Vazgen Sargsyan Republican Stadium: 2001–08
- Pyunik Stadium: 2008
- Vazgen Sargsyan Republican Stadium: 2008–13
- Yerevan Football Academy Stadium: 2013–17
- Vazgen Sargsyan Republican Stadium/Pyunik Stadium: 2017–18
- Vazgen Sargsyan Republican Stadium: 2018–2026
- Freedom Arena: 2026-present

== Supporters ==
Pyunik's supporter base is traditionally regarded as part of Yerevan's higher class, in contrast with the supposedly more lower-class base of cross-town arch rival FC Urartu. Because of the club's history and recent success, the fanbase has grown not only in Yerevan, but in other provinces of Armenia and within the Armenian Diaspora as well.

Pyunik is considered to be one of the most popular clubs in Armenia, and has one of the biggest Ultras fanbases in Armenia, called Sector 18, named after the sector they occupy at the Vazgen Sargsyan Republican Stadium.

== Rivalries ==
Pyunik's rivalry with Ararat originates with the creation of the club itself. Pyunik's founder Khoren Oganesian, is considered an Ararat club idol, due to his achievements at the club during the Soviet period, winning the 1975 Soviet Cup. Pyunik's success in recent history has led the club's image to surpass that of Ararat, which has led to arguments over which club has had a bigger impact on Armenian football.

The other rivalry, between Pyunik and Urartu is also known as the clash of Yerevan neighborhoods, since Pyunik is located in the wealthier Kentron neighborhood, whereas Urartu is located in the lower-class Malatia-Sebastia neighborhood. The rivalry between both teams originates from Urartu's relocation from Abovyan to Yerevan in 2001, competing with and eventually becoming one of the largest teams in the city. Both teams' youth academies also compete with each other as they are considered to be two of the best in the country.

== Players ==
=== Current squad ===
As of 24 September 2026

Note: Flags indicate national team as defined under FIFA eligibility rules; some limited exceptions apply. Players may hold more than one non-FIFA nationality.

No.	Pos.	Nation	Player
3	DF	GRE	Nikos Kenourgios
4	DF	ARM	Erik Simonyan
5	DF	BRA	James Santos
7	FW	ARM	Edgar Malakyan (captain)
8	FW	ARM	Gevorg Tarakhchyan
9	MF	ARM	Artak Dashyan
10	MF	NED	Iman Griffith
11	MF	ARM	Hovhannes Harutyunyan
14	FW	NGR	Steven Alfred
15	DF	RUS	Mikhail Kovalenko
16	GK	ARM	Henri Avagyan
17	MF	ARM	Vyacheslav Afyan
19	FW	ARM	Sargis Metoyan

No.	Pos.	Nation	Player
20	MF	ARM	Davit Hakobyan
22	MF	SRB	Sead Islamović
23	FW	MOZ	Witi
25	MF	RUS	Daniil Kulikov
29	FW	CYP	Iasonas Pikis
44	MF	ARM	Hayk Tatosyan
71	GK	ARM	Stanislav Buchnev
76	DF	POR	Filipe Almeida
77	DF	POR	Gonçalo Miguel
79	DF	UKR	Serhiy Vakulenko
88	DF	ARM	Robert Darbinyan
99	MF	TJK	Alisher Rakhimov
—	MF	CIV	Mohamed Bamba

=== Out on loan ===
Note: Flags indicate national team as defined under FIFA eligibility rules; some limited exceptions apply. Players may hold more than one non-FIFA nationality.

No.	Pos.	Nation	Player
—	DF	ARM	Mark Avetisyan (at BKMA Yerevan)
—	DF	ARM	Sergey Harutyunyan (at BKMA Yerevan)
—	DF	ARM	Karen Hovakimyan (at BKMA Yerevan)

No.	Pos.	Nation	Player
—	FW	ARM	Aris Karapetyan (at BKMA Yerevan)
—	FW	ARM	Levon Vardanyan (at BKMA Yerevan)

=== Technical staff ===
Position	Name
Head coach	(Russia) Dmitri Gunko
Assistant coach	(Russia) Dmitri Kudryashov
Assistant coach	(Russia) Nikolai Tyunin
Assistant coach	(Russia) Igor Menshchikov
Assistant coach	(Armenia) Artur Avagyan
Goalkeepers coach	(Armenia) Gurgen Hakobyan
Fitness Trainer	(Italy) Ciro Hosseini Varde'i
Head of Medical Service	(Ukraine) Dmytro Lisityn
Masseurs	(Armenia) Hayk Mnatsakanyan, Sergey Yaylakhanyan and Robert Nersisyan
Team Manager	(Armenia) Hovhannes Hayrapetyan
Team Administrator	(Armenia) Garik Ghazaryan
Pyunik Academy Head Coach	(Armenia) Aram Voskanyan

== Management ==
=== Executive board ===
Anton Farber is the current owner and President of Pyunik since 2024.

- General Director: Suren Baghdasaryan
- Sporting Director: Denys Kulakov
- Financial Director: Davit Tonoyan

=== Staff ===
- Technical Director: Tigran Poghosyan
- General Secretary: Lilit Avagyan
- Sports director of Pyunik Academy: Aram Gyulbudaghyan
- Chief scout: Nikolai Babkin
- Head of International Scouting: Victor Lafuente

== Honours ==
- Armenian Premier League
  - Champions (16): 1992, 1995–96, 1996–97, 2001, 2002, 2003, 2004, 2005, 2006, 2007, 2008, 2009, 2010, 2014–15, 2021–22, 2023–24 (record)
  - Runners-up (2): 2018–19, 2022–23
- Armenian Cup
  - Winners (8): 1995–96, 2002, 2004, 2009, 2010, 2012–13, 2013–14, 2014–15 (record)
  - Runners-up (3): 1996–97 2006, 2016–17
- Armenian Super Cup
  - Winners (10): 1998, 2002, 2004, 2005, 2007, 2008, 2010, 2011, 2015, 2022 (record)
  - Runners-up (6): 1996, 2003, 2006, 2009, 2013, 2014, 2024

== Other sports sections ==
=== Football reserves and academy ===
The reserve is currently coached by Levon Stepanyan and competes in the Armenian First League. The youth academy is managed by Aram Voskanyan.

Notable players from the youth academy include Henrikh Mkhitaryan, Robert Arzumanyan, Karlen Mkrtchyan, Edgar Manucharyan, Varazdat Haroyan and Gevorg Ghazaryan.

== See also ==
- Football in Armenia
- Football Federation of Armenia
