= Shirak SC =

Sports club in Armenia

Shirak
- Full name: Football Club Shirak
- Nickname: Սև Հովազներ Sev Hovazner (Black Panthers)
- Founded: 1958; 68 years ago
- Ground: Gyumri City Stadium
- Capacity: 4,500
- President: Arman Sahakyan
- Manager: Tigran Davtyan
- League: Armenian Premier League
- 2024–25: 7th of 11
- Website: fcshirak.am
Home colours	Away colours	Third colours

Football Club Shirak (Armenian: Շիրակ Ֆուտբոլային Ակումբ), commonly known as Shirak, is an Armenian professional sports club based in Gyumri. Shirak is known for its professional football team which is one of the oldest football clubs in Armenia, having been created in 1958. The club is the only team that participated in all seasons of the Armenian Premier League since its creation in 1992 until 2021. Shirak is one of the more successful clubs in Armenia, having won a total of 11 domestic titles including four Armenian Premier League titles, two Armenian Cup, and five Armenian Super Cup.

Shirak has yet to qualify for an international tournament playoff round, yet frequently plays UEFA Champions League and UEFA Europa League qualifying matches.

Shirak's home stadium is the 4,500 seater Gyumri City Stadium, the oldest venue in Armenia. Shirak's youth academy has also produced successful players, including Artur Petrosyan and Harutyun Vardanyan.

== History ==
Shirak was founded in Gyumri in 1958, when Armenia was still a part of the Soviet Union. The club was originally named Shirak Leninakan, the latter being the name for Gyumri during the Soviet Union. From its creation to the fall of the Soviet Union, Shirak played all its matches in the Soviet third division First League.

Following the fall of the Soviet Union and the renaming of Leninakan, Shirak changed its name to Shirak Kumayri, and was placed in the Armenian Premier League with head coach Andranik Adamyan in charge.

1992 was the first Armenian Premier League season played in history, which ended with Shirak and Pyunik tied at the top with 37 points each. After failing to agree on a tie-breaking match, it was decided to award the title to both teams. Thus, Shirak managed to win the league in the first domestic league in Armenian history.

Shirak once again changed its name in late 1992 after the name Kumayri was changed for Gyumri. Therefore 1993 was the first appearance as Shirak Gyumri in the Armenian Premier League. After finishing second in the 1993 league season, Shirak qualified to the Armenian Cup final for the first time, yet failed to claim the title after losing 3–1 to Ararat.

Shirak went on to win the 1994 and 1995 seasons, however was not given the 1995 title due to it being a transitional spring season.

The next four seasons were not successful for the club, however Shirak managed to claim the league title again in 1999, with striker Arayik Adamyan scoring 16 goals. The league title would end up being the last title Shirak would win until the 2011–12 Armenian Cup.

Shirak would eventually go on to win the 2012–13 Armenian Premier League and the 2016–17 Armenian Cup final.

=== Domestic history since 1992 ===
Season	League									National Cup	Top goalscorer		Manager
Season	Div.	Pos.	Pl.	W	D	L	GS	GA	P	National Cup	Name	League	Manager
1992	Armenian Premier League	1st	22	17	3	2	58	14	37	Semi-final	(Armenia) Grigor Grigoryan	19	(Armenia) Andranik Adamyan
1993	Armenian Premier League	2nd	28	24	1	3	101	20	49	Runner-up	(Armenia) Abraham Khashmanyan	14	(Armenia) Andranik Adamyan
1994	Armenian Premier League	1st	28	24	4	0	83	19	52	Runner-up	(Armenia) Artur Petrosyan	15	(Armenia) Andranik Adamyan
1995	Armenian Premier League	1st	10	7	3	0	23	6	24	Semi-final	(Armenia) Hovhannes Tahmazyan (Armenia) Samvel Nikolyan (Armenia) Grigor Grigoryan	4	(Armenia) Andranik Adamyan
1995–96	Armenian Premier League	2nd	22	16	3	3	67	23	51	Semi-final	(Armenia) Arayik Adamyan	15	(Armenia) Andranik Adamyan
1996–97	Armenian Premier League	4th	22	15	2	5	57	11	47	Quarter-final	(Armenia) Artur Petrosyan	11	(Armenia) Andranik Adamyan
1997	Armenian Premier League	2nd	18	12	5	1	46	8	41	Not held	(Armenia) Artur Petrosyan	18	(Armenia) Andranik Adamyan
1998	Armenian Premier League	2nd	26	19	4	3	72	25	61	Quarter-final	(Armenia) Arayik Adamyan	13	(Armenia) Andranik Adamyan
1999	Armenian Premier League	1st	32	23	4	5	93	29	73	Runner-up	(Armenia) Arayik Adamyan	16	(Armenia) Andranik Adamyan
2000	Armenian Premier League	3rd	28	17	7	4	64	21	58	Quarter-final	(Armenia) Artur Petrosyan	15	(Armenia) Andranik Adamyan
2001	Armenian Premier League	4th	22	14	5	3	52	19	47	Semi-final	(Armenia) Ararat Harutyunyan (Armenia) Tigran Davtyan	9	(Armenia) Andranik Adamyan
2002	Armenian Premier League	2nd	22	16	3	3	49	15	51	Quarter-final	(Armenia) Ararat Harutyunyan	10	(Armenia) Andranik Adamyan
2003	Armenian Premier League	3rd	28	17	2	9	63	34	53	Semi-final	(Armenia) Tigran Davtyan	15	(Armenia) Andranik Adamyan
2004	Armenian Premier League	8th	28	4	9	15	27	49	21	Semi-final	(Armenia) Yervand Hakobyan	7	(Armenia) Andranik Adamyan
2005	Armenian Premier League	8th	18	3	3	12	19	36	12	Quarter-final	(Armenia) Karen G. Khachatryan (Armenia) Andranik Barikyan	5	(Armenia) Zhora Barseghyan
2006	Armenian Premier League	7th	28	4	7	17	21	64	19	Quarter-final	(Armenia) Ara Mkrtchyan	5	(Armenia) Zhora Barseghyan
2007	Armenian Premier League	6th	28	9	7	12	27	37	34	Quarter-final	(Armenia) Artyom Bernetsyan	7	(Armenia) Zhora Barseghyan
2008	Armenian Premier League	7th	28	5	4	19	15	40	19	Quarter-final	(Armenia) Andranik Barikyan	4	(Armenia) Zhora Barseghyan
2009	Armenian Premier League	6th	28	5	8	15	24	55	23	Quarter-final	(Armenia) Andranik Barikyan	8	(Armenia) Zhora Barseghyan
2010	Armenian Premier League	8th	28	2	4	22	22	68	10	Quarter-final	(Armenia) Mkrtich Nalbandyan	9	(Armenia) Vardan Bichakhchyan
2011	Armenian Premier League	7th	28	6	7	15	27	42	25	Runner-up	(Armenia) Andranik Barikyan	10	(Armenia) Samvel Petrosyan
2011–12	Armenian Premier League	Only Cup competition was held								Winner			(Armenia) Vardan Bichakhchyan
2012–13	Armenian Premier League	1st	42	26	10	6	70	38	88	Runner-up	(Senegal) Yoro Lamine Ly	18	(Armenia) Vardan Bichakhchyan
2013–14	Armenian Premier League	2nd	28	13	8	7	48	31	47	Quarter-final	(Ivory Coast) Serges Déblé	15	(Armenia) Vardan Bichakhchyan
2014–15	Armenian Premier League	3rd	28	14	7	7	51	32	49	Quarter-final	(Ivory Coast) Jean-Jacques Bougouhi	21	(Armenia) Vardan Bichakhchyan
2015–16	Armenian Premier League	2nd	28	15	7	6	41	27	52	Quarter-final	(Ivory Coast) Konan Odilon Kouakou	6	(Armenia) Vardan Bichakhchyan
2016–17	Armenian Premier League	3rd	30	16	5	9	31	24	53	Winner	(Armenia) Viulen Ayvazyan	8	(Armenia) Vardan Bichakhchyan
2017–18	Armenian Premier League	4th	30	14	8	8	37	31	38	Semi-final	(Ivory Coast) Moussa Bakayoko	7	(Armenia) Vardan Bichakhchyan
2018–19	Armenian Premier League	7th	32	7	15	10	26	30	36	First round	(Ivory Coast) Moussa Bakayoko (Armenia) Aram Muradyan	4	(Armenia) Vardan Bichakhchyan
2019–20	Armenian Premier League	4th	28	13	7	8	40	30	46	Second round	(Ivory Coast) Mory Kone	23	(Armenia) Vardan Bichakhchyan
2020–21	Armenian Premier League	9th	24	2	7	15	19	53	13	First round	(Armenia) Artyom Mikaelyan, (Serbia) Igor Stanojević, (Armenia) Arman Aslanyan	2	(Armenia) Tigran Davtyan
2021–22	Armenian First League	2nd	28	22	3	3	83	19	69	First round	(Armenia) Artem Gevorgyan	12	(Armenia) Tigran Davtyan
2022–23	Armenian Premier League	7th	36	10	6	20	25	55	36	Runner-up	(Ivory Coast) Moussa Bakayoko	7	(Armenia) Tigran Davtyan
2023–24	Armenian Premier League	8th	36	8	9	19	28	46	33	Semi-final	(Ivory Coast) Donald Kodia	6	(Armenia) Tigran Davtyan
2024–25	Armenian Premier League	7th	30	10	5	15	30	50	35	Second round	(Armenia) Lyova Mryan	5	(Armenia) Tigran Davtyan

=== European ===
As of match played 27 August 2020

Competition	Pld	W	D	L	GF	GA	GD
UEFA Champions League	6	1	3	2	6	5	+1
UEFA Cup & UEFA Europa League	29	4	5	20	15	53	–38
UEFA Intertoto Cup	4	1	1	2	7	10	–3
Total	39	6	9	24	28	68	–40

Season	Competition	Round	Club	Home	Away	Aggregate
1995–96	UEFA Cup	PR	(Poland) Zagłębie Lubin	0–1	0–0	0–1
1996–97	UEFA Cup	PR	(Cyprus) Anorthosis Famagusta	2–2	0–4	2–6
1998–99	UEFA Cup	1Q	(Sweden) Malmö	0–2	0–5	0–7
1999–00	UEFA Cup	1Q	(Finland) HJK Helsinki	1–0	0–2	1–2
2000–01	UEFA Champions League	1Q	(Belarus) BATE Borisov	1–1	1–2	2–3
2001	UEFA Intertoto Cup	1R	(Hungary) Tatabánya	1–3	3–2	4–5
2002	UEFA Intertoto Cup	1R	(Portugal) Santa Clara	3–3	0–2	3–5
2003–04	UEFA Cup	QR	(Denmark) Nordsjælland Farum	0–2	0–4	0–6
2004–05	UEFA Cup	1Q	(Moldova) Tiraspol	1–2	0–2	1–4
2012–13	UEFA Europa League	1Q	(Montenegro) Rudar Pljevlja	1–1	1–0	2–1
2012–13	UEFA Europa League	2Q	(Israel) Bnei Yehuda Tel Aviv	0–1	0–2	0–3
2013–14	UEFA Champions League	1Q	(San Marino) Tre Penne	3–0	0–1	3–1
2013–14	UEFA Champions League	2Q	(Serbia) Partizan Belgrade	1–1	0–0	1–1
2014–15	UEFA Europa League	1Q	(Kazakhstan) Shakhter Karagandy	1–2	0–4	1–6
2015–16	UEFA Europa League	1Q	(Bosnia and Herzegovina) HŠK Zrinjski Mostar	2–0	1–2	3–2
2015–16	UEFA Europa League	2Q	(Sweden) AIK Fotboll	0–2	0–2	0–4
2016–17	UEFA Europa League	1Q	(Georgia (country)) Dila Gori	1–0 (aet)	0–1	1–1 (4–1 p)
2016–17	UEFA Europa League	2Q	(Slovakia) Spartak Trnava	1–1	0–2	1–3
2017–18	UEFA Europa League	1Q	(Slovenia) Gorica	0–2	2–2	2–4
2020–21	UEFA Europa League	1Q	(Romania) FCSB	—N/a	0–3	—N/a

== Kit and badge ==
For most of the club's history, the team's colours were orange and black, inspired by the dominant colours present in Gyumri's architecture, specifically the Holy Saviour's Church, located in the city.

As of 2019, Shirak has reached an agreement with Swiss sportswear company Fourteen to provide all match and training apparel.

=== Kit suppliers and shirt sponsors ===
Period	Kit Manufacturer	Shirt Sponsors
2005–11	Kappa	Gyumri Beer
2012–14	Kappa	Sovrano, Fine
2014	Adidas	Sovrano, Fine
2014–15	Adidas	VTB Bank
2015–16	Adidas	Anelik Bank
2016–17	Adidas	Menu.am
2017–18	Adidas	TotoGaming
2018–19	Adidas	
2019–	Fourteen	

=== Badge ===
The club's current badge design was inspired by Gyumri's seal, with the main feature being the lion and cross which were present on the flag of the Bagratuni dynasty, which ruled Bagratid Armenia during the Middle Ages.

== Stadium ==
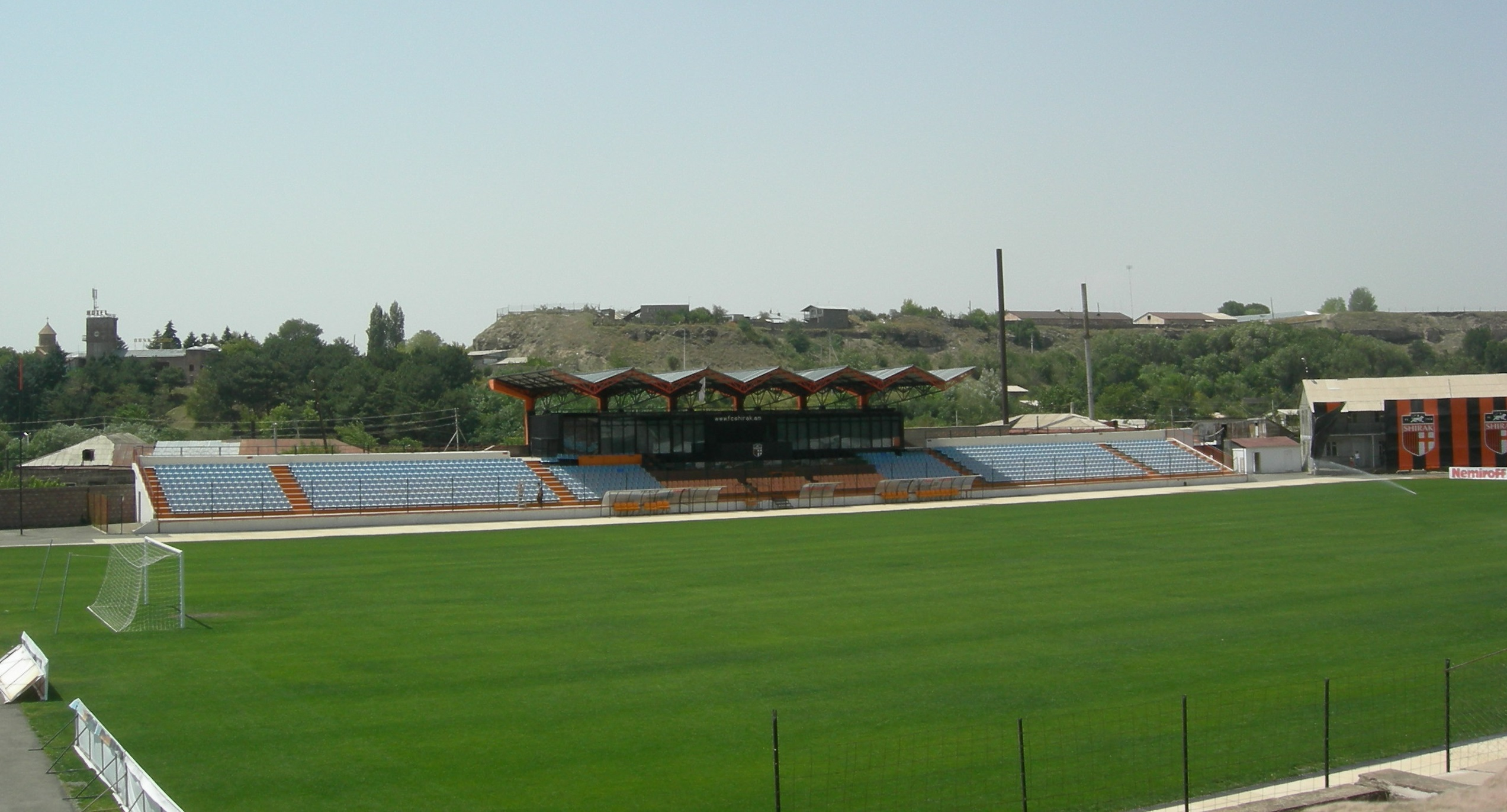
Gyumri City Stadium

Shirak's home stadium has always been the Gyumri City Stadium, built in 1924 and currently the oldest football stadium in the country. Following renovation works in 1999, the stadium became an all-seater stadium with a capacity for 2,844. The stadium pitch and facilities were upgraded in 2012 to meet all UEFA stadium regulations, allowing Shirak to play its UEFA Champions League and UEFA Europa League qualifying matches at home.

The stadium capacity was once again increased, this time to the current 4,500 capacity following a second round of renovations in 2019. These renovations included new seating in the south end of the stadium.

=== List of stadiums used by the club ===
- Gyumri City Stadium: 1958–

== Supporters ==
Shirak's fans are known as the Black Panthers, in honor of the panther that appears on the flag of the Bagratid dynasty. Shirak's supporters are also considered to be one of the best in Armenian football, with high match attendance and active supporters during matches. Supporters have rioted against club management when the club failed to reach desired results in the past.

== Rivalries ==
Shirak's main rival is considered to be Gandzasar. This rivalry grew as both teams were the only teams in the league that weren't from Yerevan, and thus competed to be the best team from the provinces.

== Players ==
=== Current squad ===
As of 1 March 2026

Note: Flags indicate national team as defined under FIFA eligibility rules; some limited exceptions apply. Players may hold more than one non-FIFA nationality.

No.	Pos.	Nation	Player
2	DF	ARM	Hovhannes Pahlevanyan
3	DF	ARM	Ruben Karagulyan
4	DF	ARM	Hamlet Mnatsakanyan
5	DF	ARM	Tigran Sumbulyan
6	MF	ARM	Rafik Misakyan (captain)
8	MF	ARM	Levon Darbinyan
9	FW	ARM	Lyova Mryan
11	MF	ARM	Sergey Manukyan
14	MF	ARM	Vardan Tovmasyan
15	MF	ARM	Narek Janoyan
17	FW	ARM	Emil Papikyan
18	MF	ARM	Samvel Ghukasyan
20	MF	ARM	Rudik Mkrtchyan

No.	Pos.	Nation	Player
21	FW	CIV	Donald Kodia
22	DF	ARM	Mher Tarloyan
23	DF	ARM	Suren Tsarukyan
25	DF	ARM	Gagik Akulyan
26	DF	SRB	Aleksa Vidić
28	FW	NGA	Jesse Akila
55	GK	ARM	Lyova Karapetyan
60	DF	ARM	Tigran Karapetyan
66	MF	ARM	Vazgen Sargsyan
77	MF	RUS	Grigor Ghumashyan
88	DF	ARM	Yuri Vardanyan
96	GK	ARM	Sokrat Hovhannisyan

=== Out on loan ===
Note: Flags indicate national team as defined under FIFA eligibility rules; some limited exceptions apply. Players may hold more than one non-FIFA nationality.

No.	Pos.	Nation	Player

=== Technical staff ===
Position	Name
Head coach	(Armenia) Vardan Bichakhchyan
First Assistant Coach	(Armenia) Felix Khojoyan
Assistant coach	(Armenia) Hovhannes Tahmazyan
Goalkeepers Coach	(Armenia) Artur Hovhannisyan
Team Manager	(Armenia) Ararat Harutyunyan
Masseur	(Armenia) Armen Sukiasyan
Translator	(Armenia) Harutyun Harutyunyan
Shirak-2 Coach	(Armenia) Tigran Davtyan

== Institutional ==
=== Executive board ===
Arman Sahakyan has been the President of Shirak since he purchased the club in 2010.

=== Staff ===
- Technical director: Georgi Matevosyan
- Sporting director: Andranik Adamyan
- Press Secretary: Arman Maloyan
- Administrator: Suren Simonyan

== Honours ==
=== Domestic ===
==== League ====
- Armenian Premier League
  - Champions (4): 1992, 1994, 1999, 2012–13

==== Cup ====
- Armenian Cup
  - Winners (2): 2011–12, 2016–17
- Armenian Super Cup
  - Winners (6): 1997, 2000, 2003, 2013, 2017, 2023

== Other sports sections ==
=== Football reserves and academy ===
Shirak's youth academy has produced several notable players throughout its history. Artur Petrosyan is the most prominent academy product, having a successful career in Armenia and European football.

Shirak's reserves compete in the Armenian First League, the second division in Armenian football. The reserves are currently coached by Tigran Davtyan and also play their matches at the Gyumri City Stadium.

=== Futsal ===
On 8 September 2017, prior to the beginning of the 2017–18 Armenian Futsal Premier League season, Shirak Sports Club took over the Gyumri Futsal club, who were a founding member of the domestic futsal championship in Armenia which began in 1998. As a result, the futsal team was re-branded as Shirak SC Futsal.

=== Basketball ===
On 19 September 2017, Shirak announced the creation of a basketball team that would compete in the newly created Armenia Basketball League A.

== See also ==
- Football in Armenia
- Football Federation of Armenia
