= FC Mika =

Armenian football club

Mika
- Full name: Sportayin Akumb Mika Yerevan
- Founded: 1998; 28 years ago
- Ground: Mika Stadium, Yerevan
- Capacity: 7,250
- Chairman: Stepan Gevorgyan
- Manager: Samvel Sargsyan
- League: Armenian First League
- 2024-25: 12th
Home colours	Away colours

Sport Club Mika (Armenian: Սպորտային Ակումբ Միկա), commonly known as Mika, is an Armenian football club from the capital Yerevan. It was owned by the Mika Corporation LLC headed by the Russia-based Armenian businessman Mikhail Baghdasarov. The club headquarters were located on Manandyan street 41, Yerevan.

== History ==
The club was founded on November 30, 1998, as Mika-Kasakh Ashtarak in the town of Ashtarak by the owner of Mika Corporation LLC, Mikhail Baghdasarov. In 2000, they achieved their first domestic title, winning the Armenian Cup.

In 2007, Mika relocated from Ashtarak to Yerevan. They were based in their own newly built stadium in Yerevan.

However, by the end of the 2015–16 Armenian Premier League season, the club announced its retirement from professional football due to financial as well as non-financial difficulties.

The club returned to professional football in 2022 with a new name and crest and started in the 2022–23 Armenian First League, finishing in 10th. The team is currently playing the Armenian First League and Armenian Cup.

=== Crests ===
The old crest, 1998-2016

The current crest since 2022

=== Domestic history ===
Season	League									National Cup	Top goalscorer		Manager
Season	Div.	Pos.	Pl.	W	D	L	GS	GA	P	National Cup	Name	League	Manager
1999	Armenian First League	2nd	16	11	2	3	34	18	35				Rafael Galstyan
2000	Armenian Premier League	4th	28	15	4	9	45	31	49	Winner	(Armenia) Samvel Nikolyan	15	Eduard Markarov
2001	Armenian Premier League	6th	22	12	5	5	44	20	41	Winner	(Armenia) Andrey Bulanov	12	Eduard Markarov; Samvel Petrosyan; Valeriy Gladilin
2002	Armenian Premier League	6th	22	9	6	7	35	28	33	Semi-final	(Armenia) Artyom Adamyan	15	Valeriy Gladilin; Eduard Markarov; Aramais Tonoyan; Vagarshak Aslanyan; Souren Barseghyan
2003	Armenian Premier League	4th	28	15	6	7	49	29	51	Winner	(Armenia) Artyom Adamyan	10	Souren Barseghyan
2004	Armenian Premier League	2nd	28	16	7	5	41	23	55	Semi-final	(Armenia) Armen Shahgeldyan	12	Souren Barseghyan
2005	Armenian Premier League	2nd	26	14	10	2	42	20	52	Winner	(Armenia) Artyom Adamyan	13	Souren Barseghyan; Armen Adamyan
2006	Armenian Premier League	3rd	28	17	6	5	45	21	57	Winner	(Armenia) Armen Shahgeldyan	14	Armen Adamyan
2007	Armenian Premier League	3rd	28	14	8	6	42	24	50	Semi-final	(Brazil) Alex	7	Armen Adamyan; Arkady Andreasyan
2008	Armenian Premier League	4th	28	13	7	8	38	28	46	Semi-final	(Armenia) Narek Beglaryan	8	Arkady Andreasyan; Ishtvan Sekech; Souren Barseghyan
2009	Armenian Premier League	2nd	28	18	4	6	59	34	58	Semi-final	(Ivory Coast) Boti Goa	14	Ivo Šušak; Samvel Darbinyan; Armen Adamyan
2010	Armenian Premier League	4th	28	14	4	10	47	31	46	Semi-final	(Brazil) Ednei	10	Armen Adamyan; Armen Shahgeldyan
2011	Armenian Premier League	5th	28	12	8	8	36	25	44	Winner	(Armenia) Narek Beglaryan	11	Armen Shahgeldyan; Jozef Bubenko
2011–12	Armenian Premier League	Only Cup competition was held								Semi-final			Jozef Bubenko; Zsolt Hornyák
2012–13	Armenian Premier League	2nd	42	24	7	11	57	39	79	Semi-final	(Armenia) Simon Muradyan	14	Zsolt Hornyák
2013–14	Armenian Premier League	3rd	28	12	11	5	36	27	47	Semi-final	(Armenia) Vardges Satumyan	8	Aram Voskanyan
2014–15	Armenian Premier League	5th	28	9	10	9	33	34	37	Runner-Up	(Armenia) Gevorg Karapetyan	7	Aram Voskanyan
2015–16	Armenian Premier League	7th	28	9	5	14	30	32	32	Runner-Up	(Armenia) Samvel Melkonyan	5	Armen Adamyan; Sergei Yuran; Armen Shahgeldyan
2016–2022	No participation												
2022–23	Armenian First League	10th	33	11	3	19	35	77	36	Last 16	(Armenia) Hayk Galstyan	7	Samvel Sargsyan
2023–24	Armenian First League	13th	28	4	5	19	21	60	17	Second Round			

=== European history ===
Mika participated several times in the UEFA Cup qualification matches. Their best result was in 2007, when they advanced to the second qualifying round by defeating MTK Budapest, but did not advance further as they lost to the Slovak club Petržalka.

Competition	Pld	W	D	L	GF	GA
UEFA Cup/Europa League	24	3	7	14	13	37
UEFA Intertoto Cup	2	0	2	0	2	2
Total	26	3	9	14	15	39

Season	Competition	Round	Club	Home	Away	Aggregate
2000–01	UEFA Cup	QR	(Romania) Rapid București	1–0	0–3	1–3
2001–02	UEFA Cup	QR	(Romania) Braşov	0–2	1–5	1–7
2004–05	UEFA Cup	1Q	(Hungary) Honvéd Budapest	0–1	1–1	1–2
2005–06	UEFA Cup	1Q	(Germany) Mainz 05	0–0	0–4	0–4
2006–07	UEFA Cup	1Q	(Switzerland) Young Boys Berne	1–3	0–1	1–4
2007–08	UEFA Cup	1Q	(Hungary) MTK Budapest	1–0	1–2	2–2 (a)
2007–08	UEFA Cup	2Q	(Slovakia) Artmedia Petržalka	2–1	0–2	2–3
2008	UEFA Intertoto Cup	1R	(Moldova) Tiraspol	2–2	0–0	2–2
2009–10	UEFA Europa League	1Q	(Sweden) Helsingborgs IF	1–1	1–3	2–4
2010–11	UEFA Europa League	2Q	(North Macedonia) Rabotnički	0–0	0–1	0–1
2011–12	UEFA Europa League	2Q	(Norway) Vålerenga	0–1	0–1	0–2
2013–14	UEFA Europa League	1Q	(Montenegro) Rudar Pljevlja	1–1	0–1	1–2
2014–15	UEFA Europa League	1Q	(Croatia) RNK Split	1–1	0–2	1–3

== Stadium ==
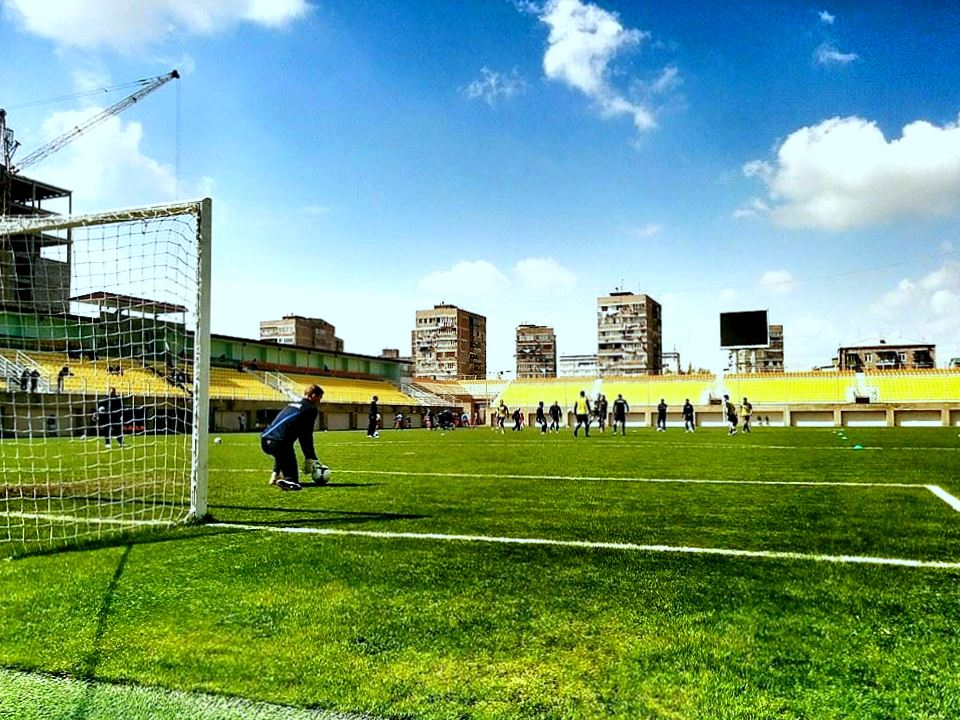
Mika Stadium

Prior to its relocation from Ashtarak to Yerevan between 1999 and 2007, the Kasaghi Marzik Stadium was the home venue of the team. Between 2008 and 2016 and since 2022 FC Mika play their home games at the Mika Stadium opened in 2008 and located in the Shengavit District of Yerevan. The stadium has a capacity of 7,250.

== Achievements ==
- Armenian Cup (6): 2000, 2001, 2003, 2005, 2006, 2011
- Armenian Supercup (2): 2005, 2012

== Managers ==
- (Armenia) Rafael Galstyan (1999)
- (Armenia) Eduard Markarov (2000–01)
- (Armenia) Samvel Petrosyan (2001)
- (Russia) Valeriy Gladilin (2001–02)
- (Armenia) Eduard Markarov (2002)
- (Armenia) Aramais Tonoyan (2002)
- (Armenia) Vagarshak Aslanyan (2002)
- (Armenia) Souren Barseghyan (2002–05)
- (Russia) Armen Adamyan (2005–07)
- (Armenia) Arkady Andreasyan (2007–08)
- (Russia) Ishtvan Sekech (2008)
- (Armenia) Souren Barseghyan (2008–09)
- (Croatia) Ivo Šušak (1 Jan 2009 – 30 June 2009)
- (Armenia) Samvel Darbinyan (1 July 2009 – 30 June 2010)
- (Russia) Armen Adamyan (2009–10)
- (Armenia) Armen Shahgeldyan (2010–11)
- (Slovakia) Jozef Bubenko (19 July 2011 – 1 Dec 2011)
- (Slovakia) Zsolt Hornyák (1 March 2012 – 30 June 2013)
- (Armenia) Aram Voskanyan (1 July 2013 – 30 June 2015)
- (Armenia) Armen Adamyan (1 July 2015 – 18 January 2016)
- (Russia) Sergei Yuran (19 January 2016 – 4 May 2016)
- (Armenia) Armen Shahgeldyan (5 May 2016 – June 2016)
- (Armenia) Samvel Sargsyan (2022–present)

== See also ==
- Football in Armenia
- Football Federation of Armenia
