= Zvartnots-AAL FC =

Zvartnots-AAL
- Full name: Zvartnots Armenian Airlines Football Club
- Founded: 1997
- Dissolved: 2003
- Ground: Erebuni Stadium, Yerevan
- Capacity: 544
- Chairman: Arthur Mnatsakanyan
- Manager: Samvel Khasaboglian
- 2002: Armenian Premier League, 7th
Home colours	Away colours

Zvartnots-AAL Football Club (Armenian: Զվարթնոց-ՀԱՈւ Ֆուտբոլային Ակումբ – Zvartnots-AAL Futbolayin Akumb), is a defunct Armenian football club, from the capital Yerevan, represented the Armenian Airlines.

== History ==
The club was founded in February 1997 by the Armenian Airlines, the state-owned flag carrier of Armenia. It made its debut in Armenian football in the 1997 Armenian First League, where they finished on 8th position. The team produced its first notable result in the 1998 Armenian First League, where it became the league's champions and won promotion to the Armenian Premier League. In a few years Zvartnots-AAL would become one of the main contenders to the Premier League title. In their first Premier League season they reached the fourth spot, while in 2001 they became second after FC Pyunik. In the 2003 season they would still be among the Premier League clubs, however they withdrew before the season began and disbanded. They have been inactive ever since.

== Zvartnots-AAL in European cups ==
As of July, 2009.

Competition	Pld	W	D	L	GF	GA
UEFA Cup	2	1	0	1	3	6

Season	Competition	Round	Club	1st leg	2nd leg
2002/03	UEFA Cup	QR	(Slovenia) NK Primorje	1–6	**2 – 0**

- Home results are noted in **bold**
