= Armenian Premier League =

Armenian national top division professional association football league

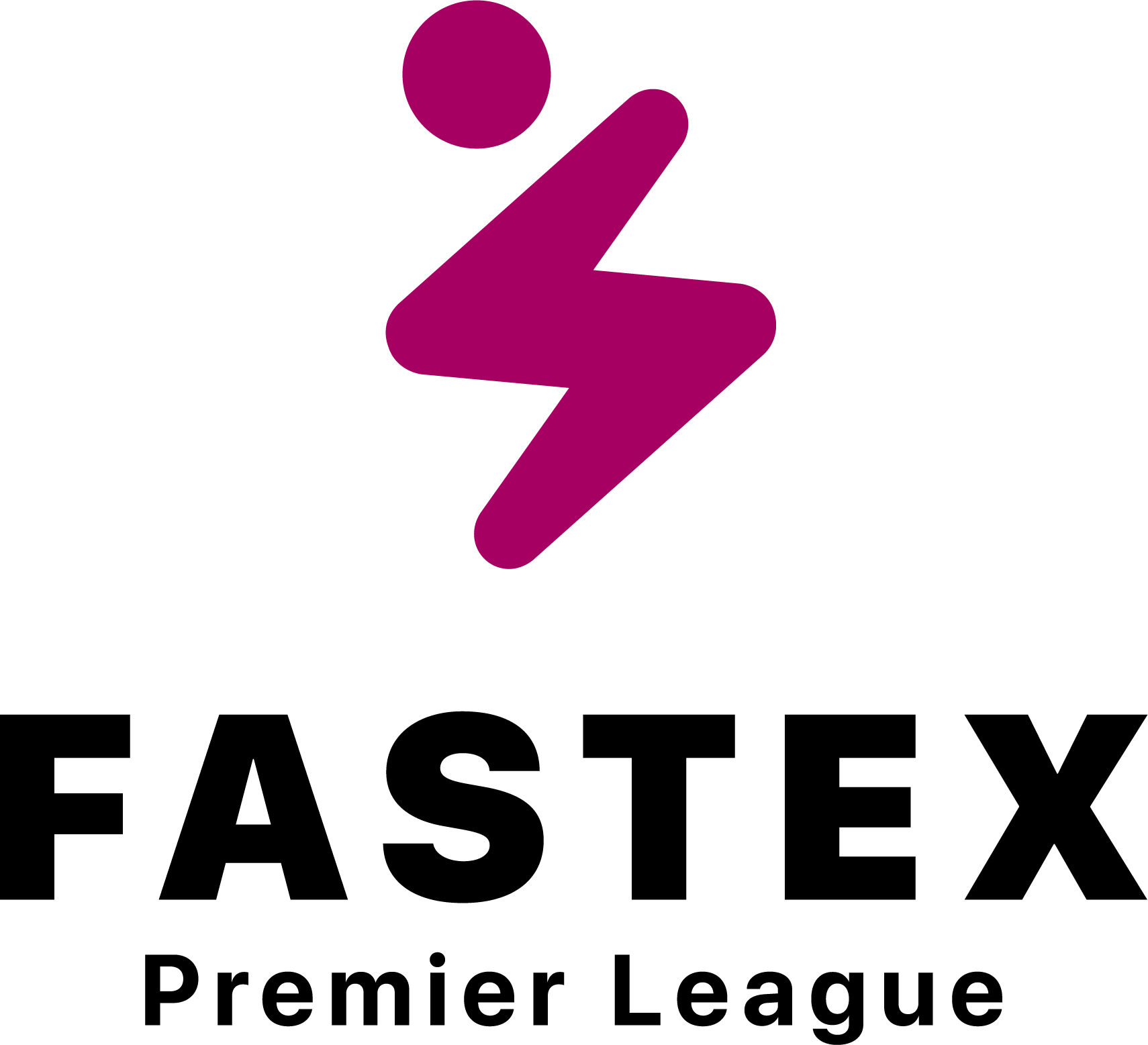
- Founded: 1992; 34 years ago
- Country: Armenia
- Confederation: UEFA
- Number of clubs: 12
- Level on pyramid: 1
- Relegation to: Armenian First League
- Domestic cup(s): Armenian Cup; Armenian Supercup
- International cup(s): UEFA Champions League; UEFA Europa League; UEFA Conference League
- Current champions: FC Ararat-Armenia (3rd title) (2025-26)
- Most championships: Pyunik (16 titles)
- Broadcasters: FAST TV; YouTube
- Website: premierleague.ffa.am
- Current: 2026–27 Armenian Premier League

The Armenian Premier League (Armenian: Հայաստանի Պրեմիեր Լիգա is the top football competition in Armenia. From 1936 to 1991, the competition was held as a regional tournament within the USSR. Following Armenia's independence, the Football Federation of Armenia has been the governing authority of the league. Over the years, the league has evolved into a small league consisting of ten teams. The winner of the league is awarded a spot in the first qualifying round of the UEFA Champions League.

== Current teams ==
Locations of the 2024–25 Armenian Premier League teams

| Club | Location | Stadium | Capacity |
|---|---|---|---|
| Alashkert | Yerevan (Shengavit) | Alashkert Stadium | 6,850 |
| Ararat Yerevan | Yerevan (Kentron) | Vazgen Sargsyan Republican Stadium | 14,403 |
| Ararat-Armenia | Yerevan (Avan) | Yerevan Football Academy Stadium^{1} | 1,428 |
| BKMA Yerevan | Yerevan | Yerevan Football Academy Stadium | 1,428 |
| Gandzasar | Kapan | Gandzasar Stadium | 3,500 |
| Noah | Armavir | Armavir City Stadium^{1} | 3,100 |
| Pyunik | Yerevan (Kentron) | Junior Sport Stadium | 1,200 |
| Shirak | Gyumri | Gyumri City Stadium | 4,000 |
| Urartu | Yerevan (Malatia-Sebastia) | Urartu Stadium | 4,860 |
| Van | Charentsavan | Charentsavan City Stadium | 5,000 |

== Soviet era champions ==
- 1936 Dinamo Yerevan
- 1937 Dinamo Yerevan
- 1938 Spartak Yerevan
- 1939 Spartak Yerevan
- 1940 Spartak Yerevan
- 1941–44 Not Played
- 1945 Spartak Yerevan
- 1946 Dinamo Yerevan
- 1947 Dinamo Yerevan
- 1948 Dinamo Yerevan
- 1949 Dinamo Yerevan
- 1950 Urozhai Yerevan
- 1951 Shinarar Yerevan
- 1952 Spartak Yerevan
- 1953 Karmir Drosh Leninakan (Krasnoe Znamya)
- 1954 Spartak Yerevan
- 1955 Khimik Kirovakan
- 1956 FIMA Yerevan
- 1957 Karmir Drosh Leninakan (Krasnoe Znamya)
- 1958 FIMA Yerevan
- 1959 FIMA Yerevan
- 1960 Tekstilshchik Leninakan
- 1961 Tekstilshchik Leninakan
- 1962 Tekstilshchik Leninakan
- 1963 Lokomotiv Yerevan
- 1964 Khimik Kirovakan
- 1965 Araks Yerevan
- 1966 Elektrotekhnik Yerevan
- 1967 Kotayk
- 1968 Araks Yerevan
- 1969 Araks Yerevan
- 1970 Motor Yerevan
- 1971 FIMA Yerevan
- 1972 Zvezda Yerevan
- 1973 Kotayk
- 1974 FIMA Yerevan
- 1975 Kotayk
- 1976 Kotayk
- 1977 Araks Yerevan
- 1978 Kanaz Yerevan
- 1979 Aragats Leninakan
- 1980 Aragats Leninakan
- 1981–86 Not Played
- 1987 Aragats Leninakan
- 1988 Elektrotekhnik Yerevan
- 1989 FC Kapan
- 1990 Ararat-2 Yerevan
- 1991 Syunik Kapan

== Winners ==
List of year ranges, representing seasons, and displaying the types of accomplishments of awards by the clubs and top players during those timeframes
| Year | Champions (number of titles) | Runners-up | Third place | Leading goalscorer (top scorer's club(s)) | Goals |
|---|---|---|---|---|---|
| 1992 | Shirak & Homenetmen | — | Banants | Vahe Yaghmuryan (Ararat Yerevan) | 38 |
| 1993 | Ararat Yerevan | Shirak | Banants | Andranik Hovsepyan (Banants) & Gegham Hovhannisyan (Homenetmen) | 26 |
| 1994 | Shirak (2) | Homenetmen | Ararat Yerevan | Arsen Avetisyan (Homenetmen) | 39 |
| 1995 | Transitional season (no champions declared) | | | | |
| 1995–96 | Pyunik (2) | Shirak | Yerevan | Arayik Adamyan (Shirak) | 28 |
| 1996–97 | Pyunik (3) | Ararat Yerevan | Yerevan | Arsen Avetisyan (Pyunik) | 24 |
| 1997 | Yerevan | Shirak | Erebuni-Homenmen | Artur Petrosyan (Shirak) | 18 |
| 1998 | Tsement Ararat (Araks Ararat) | Shirak | Yerevan | Ara Hakobyan (Dvin Artashat) | 20 |
| 1999 | Shirak (3) | Ararat Yerevan | Tsement Ararat | Shirak Sarikyan (Tsement Ararat) | 21 |
| 2000 | Araks Ararat (2) | Ararat Yerevan | Shirak | Ara Hakobyan (Araks Ararat) | 21 |
| 2001 | Pyunik (4) | Zvartnots AAL | Spartak Yerevan | Arman Karamyan (Pyunik) | 21 |
| 2002 | Pyunik (5) | Shirak | Banants | Arman Karamyan (Pyunik) | 36 |
| 2003 | Pyunik (6) | Banants | Shirak | Ara Hakobyan (Banants) | 45 |
| 2004 | Pyunik (7) | Mika | Banants | Edgar Manucharyan (Pyunik) & Galust Petrosyan (Pyunik) | 21 |
| 2005 | Pyunik (8) | Mika | Banants | Nshan Erzrumyan (Kilikia) | 18 |
| 2006 | Pyunik (9) | Banants | Mika | Aram Hakobyan (Banants) | 25 |
| 2007 | Pyunik (10) | Banants | Mika | Marcos Pizzelli (Ararat Yerevan) | 22 |
| 2008 | Pyunik (11) | Ararat Yerevan | Gandzasar | Marcos Pizzelli (Ararat Yerevan) | 17 |
| 2009 | Pyunik (12) | Mika | Ulisses | Artur Kocharyan (Ulisses) | 15 |
| 2010 | Pyunik (13) | Banants | Ulisses | Marcos Pizzelli (Pyunik) & Gevorg Ghazaryan (Pyunik) | 16 |
| 2011 | Ulisses | Gandzasar | Pyunik | Bruno Correa (Banants) | 16 |
| 2012–13 | Shirak (4) | Mika | Gandzasar | Norayr Gyozalyan (Impuls) | 21 |
| 2013–14 | Banants | Shirak | Mika | Mihran Manasyan (Alashkert) | 17 |
| 2014–15 | Pyunik (14) | Ulisses | Shirak | Cesar Romero (Pyunik) & Jean-Jacques Bougouhi (Shirak) | 21 |
| 2015–16 | Alashkert | Shirak | Pyunik | Héber (Alashkert) & Mihran Manasyan (Alashkert) | 16 |
| 2016–17 | Alashkert (2) | Gandzasar | Shirak | Artak Yedigaryan (Alashkert) & Mihran Manasyan (Alashkert) | 13 |
| 2017–18 | Alashkert (3) | Banants | Gandzasar | Gegham Harutyunyan (Gandzasar) & Artak Yedigaryan (Alashkert) | 12 |
| 2018–19 | Ararat-Armenia | Pyunik | Banants | Jonel Désiré (Lori) | 17 |
| 2019–20 | Ararat-Armenia (2) | Noah | Alashkert | Mory Kone (Shirak) | 23 |
| 2020–21 | Alashkert (4) | Noah | Urartu | Yusuf Otubanjo (Ararat-Armenia) | 10 |
| 2021–22 | Pyunik (15) | Ararat-Armenia | Alashkert | Serges Déblé (Ararat Yerevan, Pyunik) | 22 |
| 2022–23 | Urartu (2) | Pyunik | Ararat-Armenia | Luka Juričić, Yusuf Otubanjo (Pyunik) | 16 |
| 2023–24 | Pyunik (16) | Noah | Ararat-Armenia | Artur Miranyan (Noah) | 23 |
| 2024–25 | Noah (1) | FC Ararat-Armenia | FC Urartu | Gonçalo Gregório (Noah) | 20 |
| 2025–26 | FC Ararat-Armenia (3) | FC Noah | FC Pyunik | Bruno Michel (Urartu) | 18 |

== Performance by club ==
List of accomplishments of awards by the clubs and displaying their best seasons
| Club (number of seasons) | Winners | Runners-up | Winning years |
|---|---|---|---|
| Pyunik | 16 | 2 | 1992 (shared), 1995–96, 1996–97, 2001, 2002, 2003, 2004, 2005, 2006, 2007, 2008, 2009, 2010, 2014–15, 2021–22, 2023–24 |
| Shirak | 4 | 7 | 1992 (shared), 1994, 1999, 2012–13 |
| Alashkert | 4 | – | 2015–16, 2016–17, 2017–18, 2020–21 |
| Urartu | 2 | 5 | 2013–14, 2022–23 |
| Ararat-Armenia | 3 | 2 | 2018–19, 2019–20, 2025–26 |
| Araks Ararat | 2 | – | 1998, 2000 |
| Ararat Yerevan | 1 | 4 | 1993 |
| Noah | 1 | 4 | 2024–25 |
| Ulisses | 1 | 1 | 2011 |
| Yerevan | 1 | – | 1997 |
| Mika | – | 4 | |
| Gandzasar | – | 2 | |
| Zvartnots-AAL | – | 1 | |

Titles won by club (%)
1. Pyunik - 16 (48.5%)
2. Shirak SC - 4 (12.1%)
3. FC Alashkert – 4 (12.1%)
4. FC Urartu – 2 (6.10%)
5. FC Ararat-Armenia - 3 (6.10%)
6. Araks Ararat FC - 2 (6.10%)
7. FC Ararat Yerevan - 1 (3.00%)
8. Ulisses FC -1 (3.00%)
9. FC Yerevan - 1 (3.00%)

== Notes ==
- Homenetmen Yerevan is the former name of Pyunik Yerevan.
- Tsement Ararat is the former name of Araks Ararat.
- Banants is the former name of Urartu.
- Teams in italics no longer exists.

== Sponsorship names ==
- VBET Armenian Premier League (2020–2022)
- Fastex Armenian Premier League (2022, 2024–2026)
- IDBank Armenian Premier League (2023–2024)

== Broadcaster ==
| Country | TV Channel |
|---|---|
| Armenia | FreeNews |

== See also ==
- Armenian First League
- Football in Armenia
- Sport in Armenia
