= FIMA Yerevan =

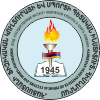
- Founded: 1945; 80 years ago
- Dissolved: 2006; 19 years ago (football section)

FIMA Yerevan (Armenian: ՖԻՄԱ Երևան) or (Armenian: Ֆիզիկուլտուրայի Ինստիտուտի Մարզական Ակումբ Երևան; Fizkulturayi instituti marzakan akumb Yerevan), meaning Physical-culture Institute Sports Club of Yerevan, was also known with its Russian abbreviation as SKIF Yerevan (Спортивный клуб института физкультуры (СКИФ)), is an Armenian sports club from the capital Yerevan, that represents the Armenian State Institute of Physical Culture and Sport. The club was founded in 1945 with the establishment of the Institute of Physical Culture.

== Men's football ==
The football section, five times champion of the SSR Armenia League, was dissolved in 2006 and is currently inactive. They were known as Hay Ari during their final appearance in domestic football in 2006.

=== Achievements ===
- SSR Armenia League
  - Champions (5): 1956, 1958, 1959, 1971, 1974

== Basketball section ==
The basketball section is one of the seven founder clubs of the Armenia Basketball League A, the main professional league in the country, established in 2017.
