= List of Armenia international footballers =

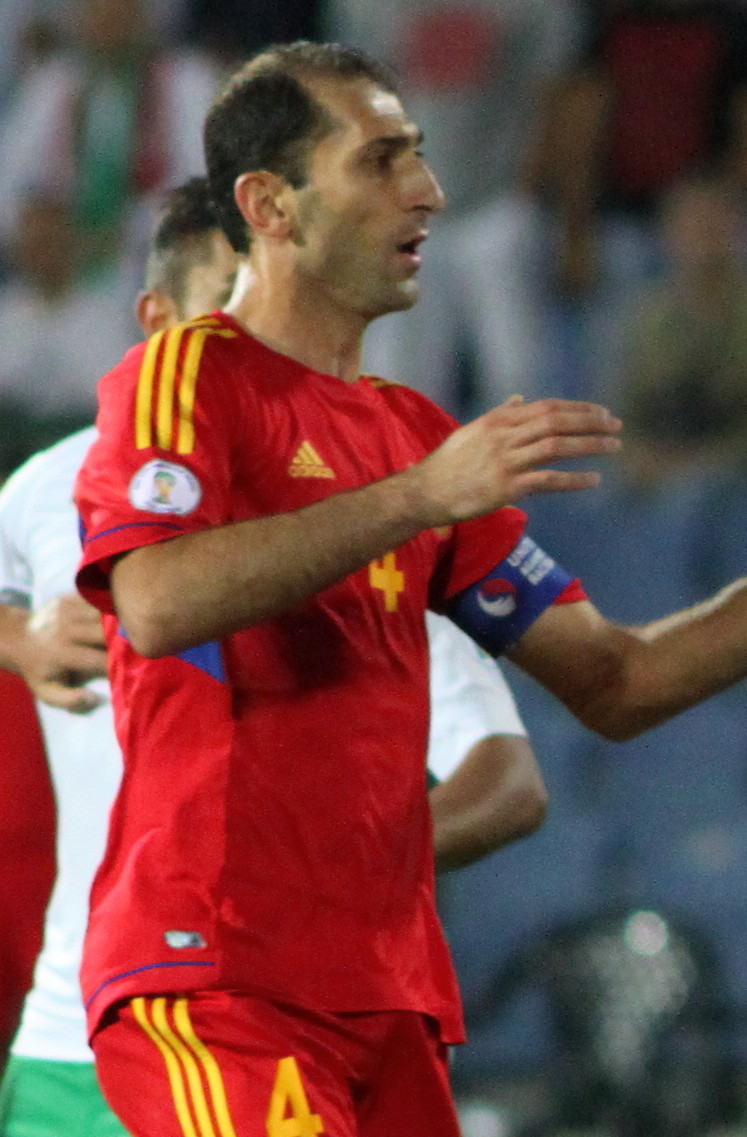
Sargis Hovsepyan is the most capped player in the history of Armenia, winning 131 caps.

The Armenia national football team has represented Armenia in international association football since 1992 after the country declared independence following the dissolution of the Soviet Union in 1991. Prior to this, Armenian players had represented the Soviet Union national football team. The team is governed by the Football Federation of Armenia (FFA) and competes as a member of the Union of European Football Associations (UEFA), which encompasses the countries of Europe and Israel. Having gained independence, the FFA was founded in 1992 and became a member of UEFA and Fédération Internationale de Football Association (FIFA) in the same year. The team played its first international match on 14 October 1992, drawing 0–0 with Moldova in a friendly, although the match is not recognised by FIFA as Moldova were not affiliated with the organisation at the time. Their first officially recognised fixture was played two years later, in May 1994, against the United States.

As of November 2018, Armenia have played 201 international fixtures, winning 49, drawing 42 and losing 110. The team's most frequent opponents have been Andorra, Denmark, Macedonia and Ukraine, having met each nation eight times. Of these teams, Armenia have been most successful against Andorra, winning seven of their eight fixtures, and least successful against Ukraine, failing to win any of the eight fixtures. In global and continental competitions, Armenia have competed in qualification groups for both the FIFA World Cup, since 1998, and the UEFA European Championship, since 1996, but have failed to qualify for any tournament finals.

Sargis Hovsepyan is Armenia's most capped player of all time and is the only player to have accumulated 100 appearances for the national team. The defender made his international debut in his country's first ever fixture in 1992, he earned his 100th cap in a 2–0 defeat to Belgium in October 2008 and finished his career with 131 caps. His last cap for Armenia was on 14 November 2012 in a 4–2 defeat to Lithuania, where he was invited to make a ceremonial appearance and played the opening five minutes of the match before being substituted. As of November 2018, Henrikh Mkhitaryan is Armenia's leading goalscorer of all time, having scored 26 goals. He scored his first international goal in 2009 and became his nation's highest scoring player on 15 October 2013 after scoring against Italy to surpass Artur Petrosyan's tally of eleven goals. Mkhitaryan's total includes a hat-trick during a 7–1 victory over Guatemala in May 2016, the first hat-trick in Armenia's history and one of only two scored by the team.

Hovsepyan was also the first player to earn 25 caps for Armenia, reaching the tally on 7 May 1997 in a 1–1 draw with Ukraine, one match before Petrosyan. The pair competed for the record of most capped player for several years before Petrosyan retired after his 68th cap while both players were tied for the record. Hovsepyan subsequently took the record in his following appearance, a 1–1 draw with Romania in November 2004, and went on to win his 100th cap on 10 September 2008. Roman Berezovsky is the second-highest capped player and the closest to Hovsepyan's record tally, winning 94 caps during his playing career as a goalkeeper. As of November 2018, 44 players have played in 25 or more international fixtures for Armenia.

== Players ==
Appearances and goals are composed of FIFA World Cup and UEFA European Championships, and each competition's required qualification matches, as well as numerous international friendly tournaments and matches. Players are listed by number of caps. If the number of caps is equal, the players are then listed alphabetically. Statistics updated following match played on 19 November 2018.

Note: Armenia's first international fixture against Moldova on 14 October 1992 is not recognized by FIFA as Moldova were not members of either FIFA or UEFA at the time. As such, the match is excluded from the totals in the table below and the notes column lists which players appeared in the match.

	Key
*	Still active for the national team (Note: Players who are still active for the national team are players who have not retired from international football and are, subsequently, eligible to be called up.)
GK	Goalkeeper
DF	Defender
MF	Midfielder
FW	Forward

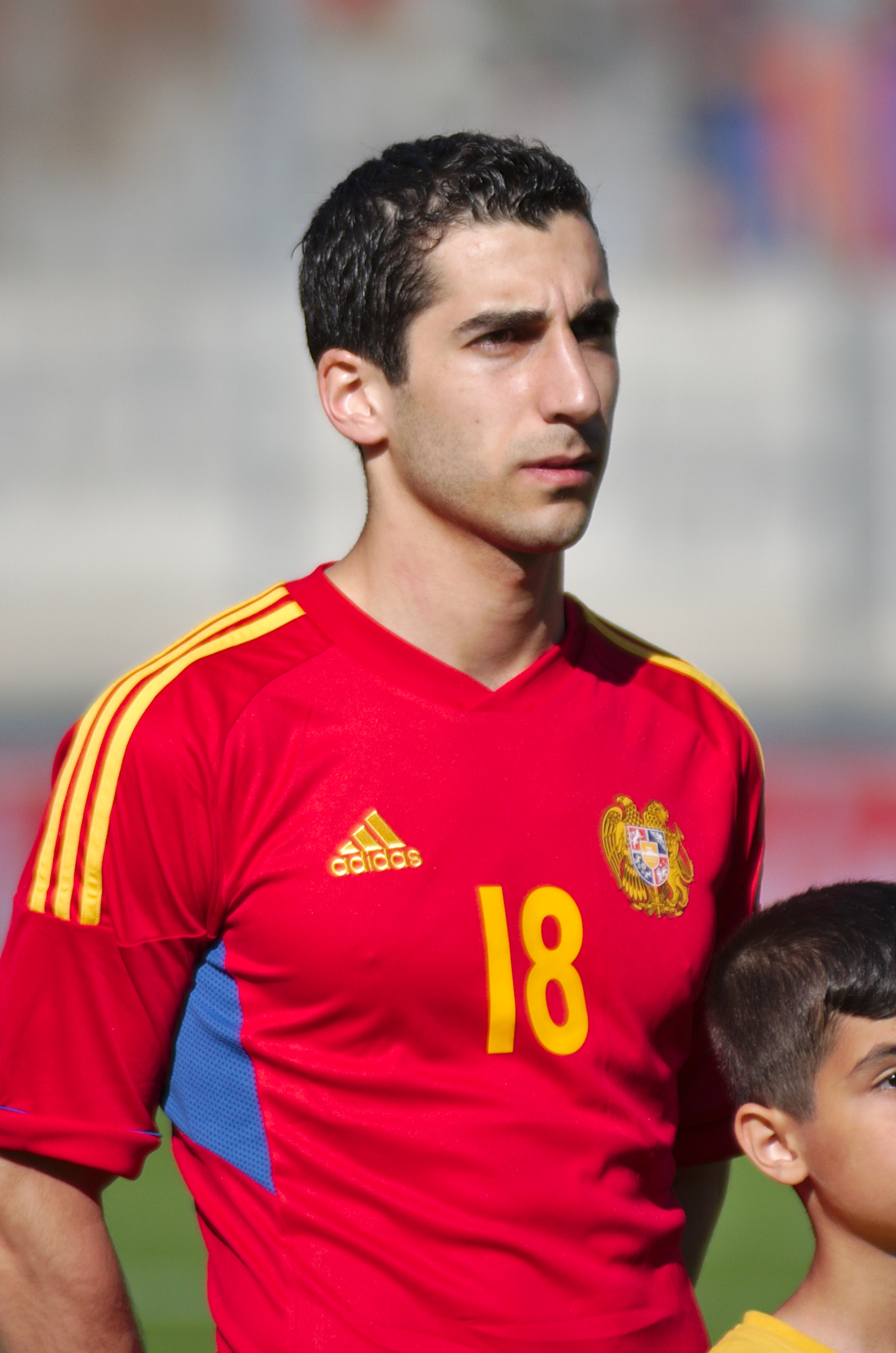
Henrikh Mkhitaryan is Armenia's record goalscorer with 26 goals.

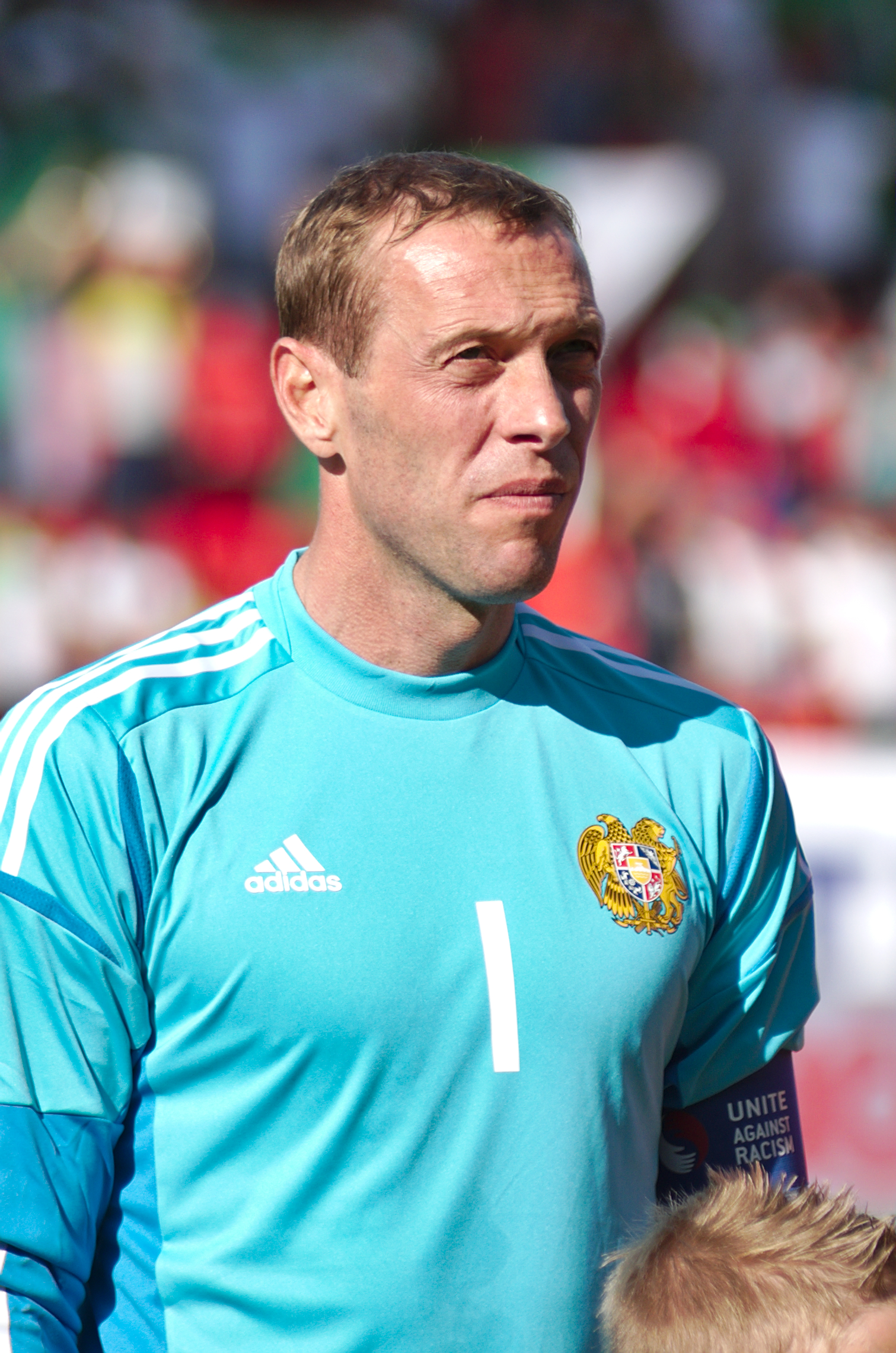
Roman Berezovsky is the second-highest capped player in Armenian history with 94 caps.

As of match played 19 June 2023

Armenia national team footballers with at least 25 appearances
No.	Name	Position	National team career	Caps	Goals	Notes
1	Sargis Hovsepyan	DF	1992–2012	131	2	Manager (Note: Hovsepyan was caretaker-manager of the national team in 2015.) (Note: Played in match against Moldova that is not recognised by FIFA)
2	Henrikh Mkhitaryan	MF	2007–2021	95	32	
3	Roman Berezovsky	GK	1996–2016	94	0	
4	Gevorg Ghazaryan*	MF	2007–	75	14	
4	Kamo Hovhannisyan*	DF	2012–	75	3	
4	Varazdat Haroyan*	DF	2011–	75	3	
7	Robert Arzumanyan	DF	2005–2015	74	5	
8	Artur Petrosyan	MF	1992–2004	68	11	Manager (Note: Petrosyan was the manager of the national team between 2016 and 2018.)
9	Marcos Pizzelli	MF	2008–2019	67	11	
10	Harutyun Vardanyan	DF	1994–2004	63	1	
11	Hamlet Mkhitaryan	MF	1994–2008	56	2	
11	Karlen Mkrtchyan *	MF	2008–2018	56	2	
11	Tigran Barseghyan*	DF	2016–	56	9	
14	Romik Khachatryan	MF	1997–2008	54	1	
14	Artur Voskanyan	MF	1999–2010	54	1	
16	Edgar Manucharyan	FW	2004–2017	53	9	
17	Armen Shahgeldyan	FW	1992–2007	52	6	
18	Artavazd Karamyan	MF	2000–2010	51	2	
18	Hrayr Mkoyan*	DF	2009–2018	51	1	
18	Artak Grigoryan*	DF	2010–	51	1	
21	Hovhannes Hambardzumyan*	DF	2010–2018	50	4	
22	Karen Dokhoyan	DF	1999–2008	48	2	
23	Arman Karamyan	FW	2000–2010	47	5	
24	Taron Voskanyan*	DF	2012–	45	0	
24	Aghvan Mkrtchyan	MF	2002–2010	45	1	
26	Ara Hakobyan	FW	1998–2009	42	7	
26	Artur Sarkisov*	FW	2011–2018	42	6	
28	Artur Yedigaryan	MF	2008–2015	41	0	
28	Alexander Tadevosyan	DF	2002–2010	41	0	
28	Aras Özbiliz*	MF	2012–2018	41	6	
31	Levon Hayrapetyan*	DF	2011–2018	40	1	
32	Yura Movsisyan	FW	2010–2018	38	14	
32	Levon Pachajyan	MF	2004–2011	38	2	
34	Yervand Sukiasyan	DF	1994–2001	36	0	
34	Sargis Adamyan*	FW	2013–	36	2	
36	Ararat Arakelyan	DF	2005–2011	33	2	
36	Albert Sarkisyan	MF	1997–2005	33	3	
36	Artak Yedigaryan*	DF	2010–2018	33	1	
39	Vardan Khachatryan	DF	1992–2000	30	1	
40	Gevorg Kasparov	GK	2004–2015	29	0	
40	Yegishe Melikyan	FW	2002–2007	29	0	
40	Samvel Melkonyan	DF	2005–2010	27	0	
43	Valeri Aleksanyan	DF	2004–2014	26	0	
43	David Manoyan*	MF	2012–2017	26	0	
45	Karen Aleksanyan	MF	2002–2008	25	0	
45	Harutyun Abrahamyan	GK	1992–2001	25	0	
45	Arthur Mkrtchyan	DF	1996–2004	25	0	
45	David Yurchenko	GK	2020–	25	0	
45	Aleksandr Karapetyan	FW	2014–	25	6	
