= List of international goals scored by Henrikh Mkhitaryan =

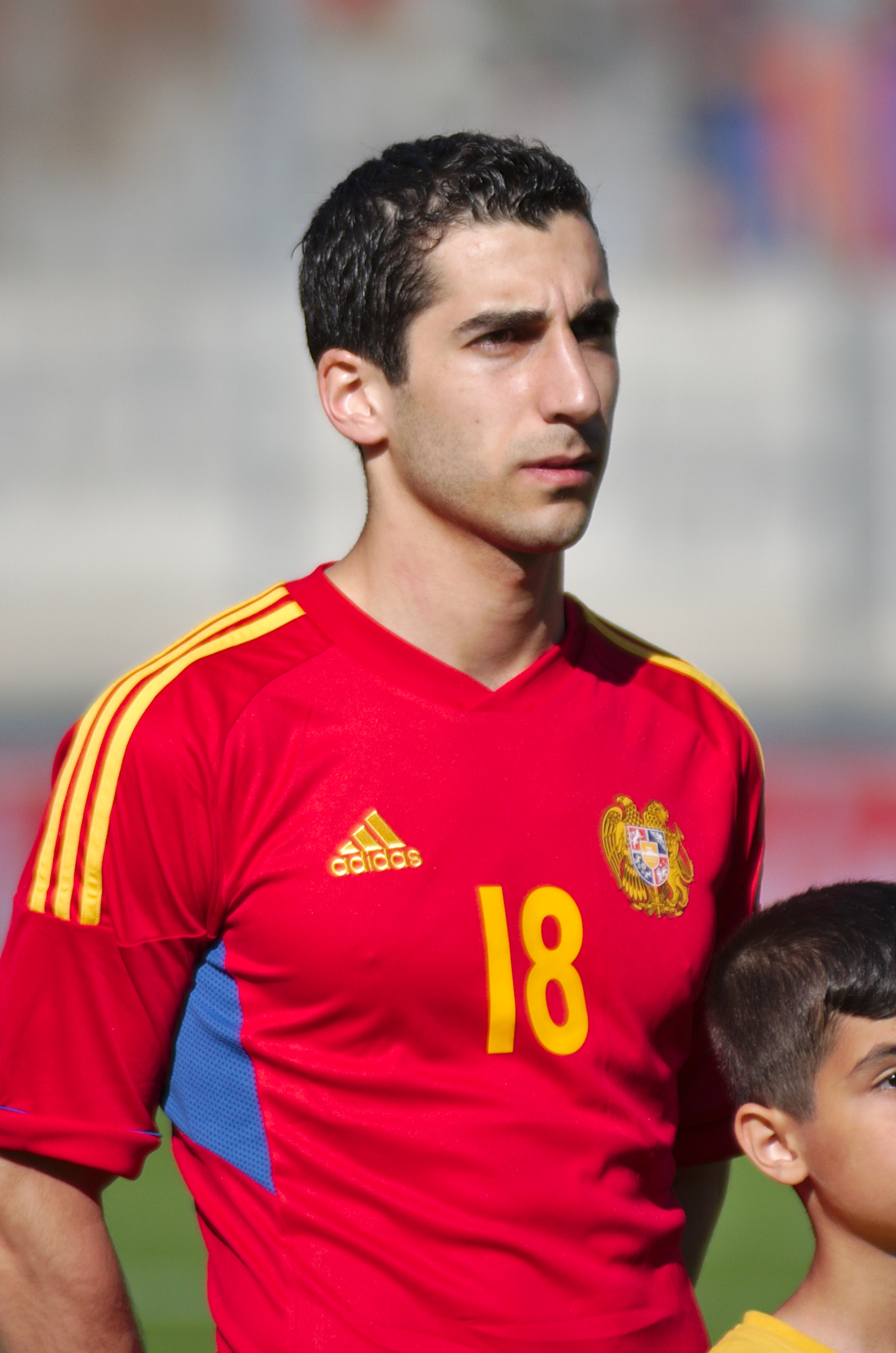
Mkhitaryan lining up for Armenia's friendly match against Algeria on 31 May 2014. He scored 32 goals in 95 caps for Armenia.

Henrikh Mkhitaryan is an Armenian professional footballer who represented the Armenia national football team as a midfielder from his debut in 2007 until his international retirement in 2022. A twelve-time Armenian Footballer of the Year, Mkhitaryan scored 32 goals in 95 international appearances, making him the country's all-time top scorer; he surpassed Artur Petrosyan's record of 11 goals on 15 October 2013 when he scored in a 2–2 World Cup qualifier draw with Italy. He made his debut for Armenia in a 1–1 draw against Panama on 14 January 2007, and scored his first international goal over two years later in his ninth appearance for his country against Estonia.

On 29 May 2016, Mkhitaryan scored Armenia's first ever international hat-trick when he netted three times in a 7–1 friendly win over Guatemala in the United States. Mkhitaryan also netted twice in a match (also known as a brace) on three occasions. He scored the most times against Bosnia and Herzegovina and Guatemala, with three total goals against each side.

Mkhitaryan scored 8 goals in FIFA World Cup qualifiers, 10 goals in UEFA European Championship qualifiers and 2 goals in the UEFA Nations League. The remainder of his goals, 12, came in friendlies. Despite playing for Armenia for 15 years, Mkhitaryan never played in the FIFA World Cup or the UEFA European Championship.

== Goals ==
Scores and results list Armenia's goal tally first, score column indicates score after each Mkhitaryan goal.

Table key
Indicates Armenia won the match
Indicates the match ended in a draw
Indicates Armenia lost the match

List of international goals scored by Henrikh Mkhitaryan
No.	Cap	Date	Venue	Opponent	Score	Result	Competition	Ref.
1	9	28 March 2009	Vazgen Sargsyan Republican Stadium, Yerevan, Armenia	Estonia	1–0	2–2	2010 FIFA World Cup qualification	
2	15	25 May 2010	Vazgen Sargsyan Republican Stadium, Yerevan, Armenia	Uzbekistan	1–0	3–1	Friendly	
3	18	8 October 2010	Vazgen Sargsyan Republican Stadium, Yerevan, Armenia	Slovakia	3–1	3–1	UEFA Euro 2012 qualification	
4	19	12 October 2010	Vazgen Sargsyan Republican Stadium, Yerevan, Armenia	Andorra	2–0	4–0	UEFA Euro 2012 qualification	
5	24	2 September 2011	Estadi Comunal la Vella, Andorra la Vella, Andorra	Andorra	3–0	3–0	UEFA Euro 2012 qualification	
6	25	6 September 2011	Štadión pod Dubňom, Žilina, Slovakia	Slovakia	2–0	4–0	UEFA Euro 2012 qualification	
7	26	7 October 2011	Vazgen Sargsyan Republican Stadium, Yerevan, Armenia	Macedonia	3–1	4–1	UEFA Euro 2012 qualification	
8	27	11 October 2011	Aviva Stadium, Dublin, Republic of Ireland	Republic of Ireland	1–2	1–2	UEFA Euro 2012 qualification	
9	34	12 October 2012	Hrazdan Stadium, Yerevan, Armenia	Italy	1–1	1–3	2014 FIFA World Cup qualification	
10	35	14 November 2012	Vazgen Sargsyan Republican Stadium, Yerevan, Armenia	Lithuania	3–0	4–2	Friendly	
11	39	11 June 2013	Parken Stadium, Copenhagen, Denmark	Denmark	4–0	4–0	2014 FIFA World Cup qualification	
12	43	15 October 2013	Stadio San Paolo, Naples, Italy	Italy	2–1	2–2	2014 FIFA World Cup qualification	
13	45	27 May 2014	Stade de la Fontenette, Carouge, Switzerland	United Arab Emirates	2–1	4–3	Friendly	
14	45	27 May 2014	Stade de la Fontenette, Carouge, Switzerland	United Arab Emirates	3–2	4–3	Friendly	
15	47	6 June 2014	Coface Arena, Mainz, Germany	Germany	1–1	1–6	Friendly	
16	49	7 September 2014	Parken Stadium, Copenhagen, Denmark	Denmark	1–0	1–2	UEFA Euro 2016 qualification	
17	58	29 May 2016	StubHub Center, Carson, United States	Guatemala	1–1	7–1	Friendly	
18	58	29 May 2016	StubHub Center, Carson, United States	Guatemala	4–1	7–1	Friendly	
19	58	29 May 2016	StubHub Center, Carson, United States	Guatemala	5–1	7–1	Friendly	
20	62	26 March 2017	Vazgen Sargsyan Republican Stadium, Yerevan, Armenia	Kazakhstan	1–0	2–0	2018 FIFA World Cup qualification	
21	63	4 June 2017	Vazgen Sargsyan Republican Stadium, Yerevan, Armenia	Saint Kitts and Nevis	2–0	5–0	Friendly	
22	63	4 June 2017	Vazgen Sargsyan Republican Stadium, Yerevan, Armenia	Saint Kitts and Nevis	3–0	5–0	Friendly	
23	68	8 October 2017	Astana Arena, Astana, Kazakhstan	Kazakhstan	1–0	1–1	2018 FIFA World Cup qualification	
24	69	9 November 2017	Vazgen Sargsyan Republican Stadium, Yerevan, Armenia	Belarus	2–0	4–1	Friendly	
25	70	13 November 2017	Vazgen Sargsyan Republican Stadium, Yerevan, Armenia	Cyprus	3–1	3–2	Friendly	
26	78	16 October 2018	Vazgen Sargsyan Republican Stadium, Yerevan, Armenia	Macedonia	4–0	4–0	2018–19 UEFA Nations League D	
27	81	23 March 2019	Stadion Grbavica, Sarajevo, Bosnia and Herzegovina	Bosnia and Herzegovina	1–2	1–2	UEFA Euro 2020 qualification	
28	86	8 September 2019	Vazgen Sargsyan Republican Stadium, Yerevan, Armenia	Bosnia and Herzegovina	1–0	4–2	UEFA Euro 2020 qualification	
29	86	8 September 2019	Vazgen Sargsyan Republican Stadium, Yerevan, Armenia	Bosnia and Herzegovina	2–1	4–2	UEFA Euro 2020 qualification	
30	87	11 October 2020	Stadion Miejski, Tychy, Poland	Georgia	2–2	2–2	2020–21 UEFA Nations League C	
31	91	8 September 2021	Vazgen Sargsyan Republican Stadium, Yerevan, Armenia	Liechtenstein	1–0	1–1	2022 FIFA World Cup qualification	
32	95	14 November 2021	Vazgen Sargsyan Republican Stadium, Yerevan, Armenia	Germany	1–3	1–4	2022 FIFA World Cup qualification	

== Statistics ==
Goals by year
Year	Competitive		Friendly		Total	
Year	Apps	Goals	Apps	Goals	Apps	Goals
2007	0	0	2	0	2	0
2008	1 (Note: Appearance(s) in FIFA World Cup qualification)	0	4	0	5	0
2009	5	1	2	0	7	1
2010	4 (Note: Appearances in UEFA European Championship qualification)	2	1	1	5	3
2011	6	4	2	0	8	4
2012	3	1	5	1	8	2
2013	7	2	1	0	8	2
2014	2	1	5	3	7	4
2015	5	0	1	0	6	0
2016	1	0	4	3	5	3
2017	6	2	3	4	9	6
2018	6 (Note: Appearances in UEFA Nations League)	1	4	0	10	1
2019	6	3	0	0	6	3
2020	2	1	0	0	2	1
2021	7	2	0	0	7	2
Total	61	20	34	12	95	32

Goals by competition
Competition	Apps	Goals
Friendlies	34	12
FIFA World Cup qualification	30	8
UEFA European Championship qualification	23	10
UEFA Nations League	8	2
Total	95	32

Goals by opponent
Opponent	Goals
Bosnia and Herzegovina	3
Guatemala	3
Andorra	2
Denmark	2
Germany	2
Italy	2
Kazakhstan	2
Macedonia	2
Saint Kitts and Nevis	2
Slovakia	2
United Arab Emirates	2
Belarus	1
Cyprus	1
Estonia	1
Georgia	1
Liechtenstein	1
Lithuania	1
Republic of Ireland	1
Uzbekistan	1
Total	32

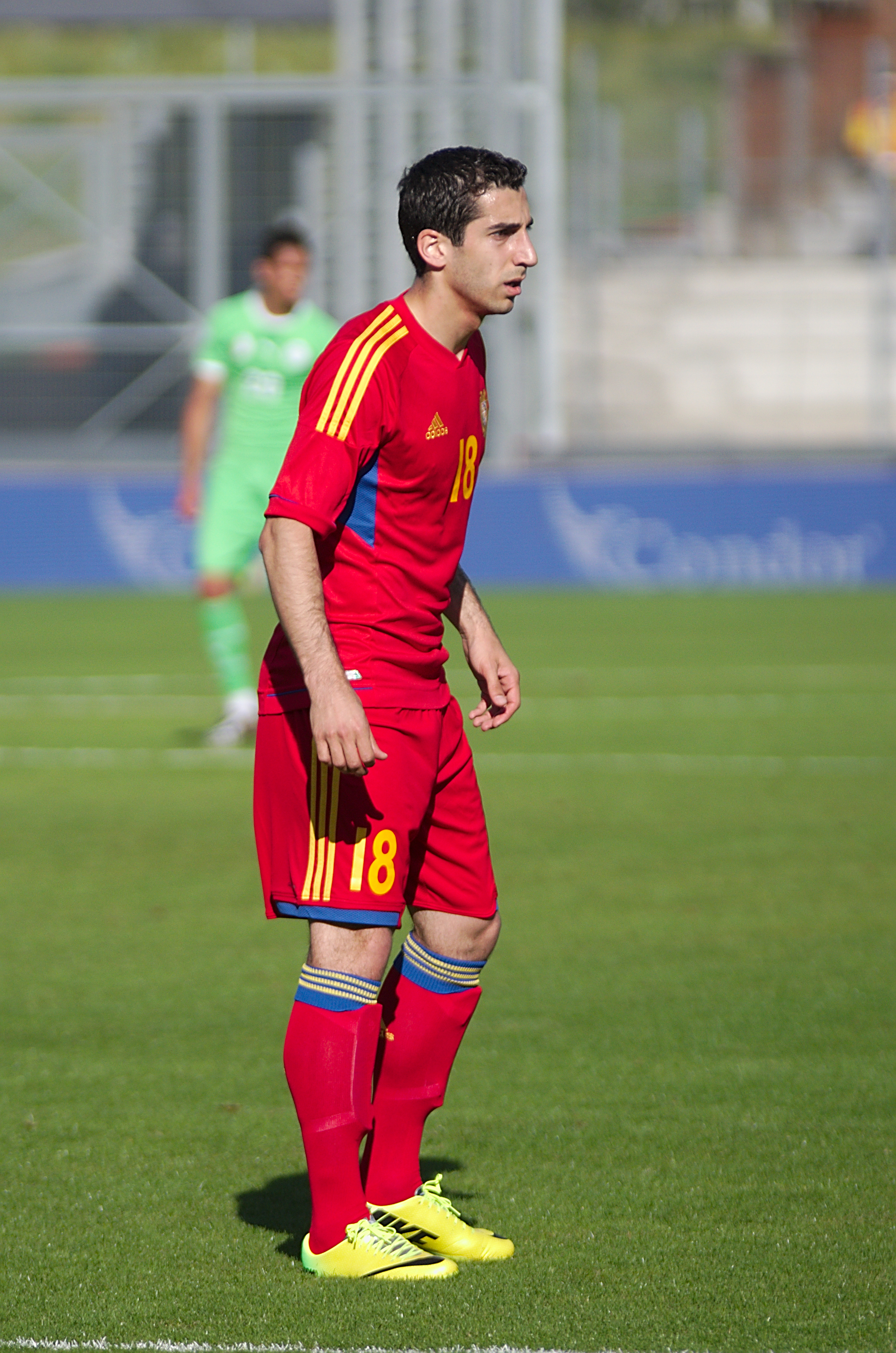
Mkhitaryan scored his only international hat-trick against Guatemala in 2016.

== See also ==
- List of top international men's football goal scorers by country
- List of Armenia international footballers
