= Armenian Footballer of the Year =

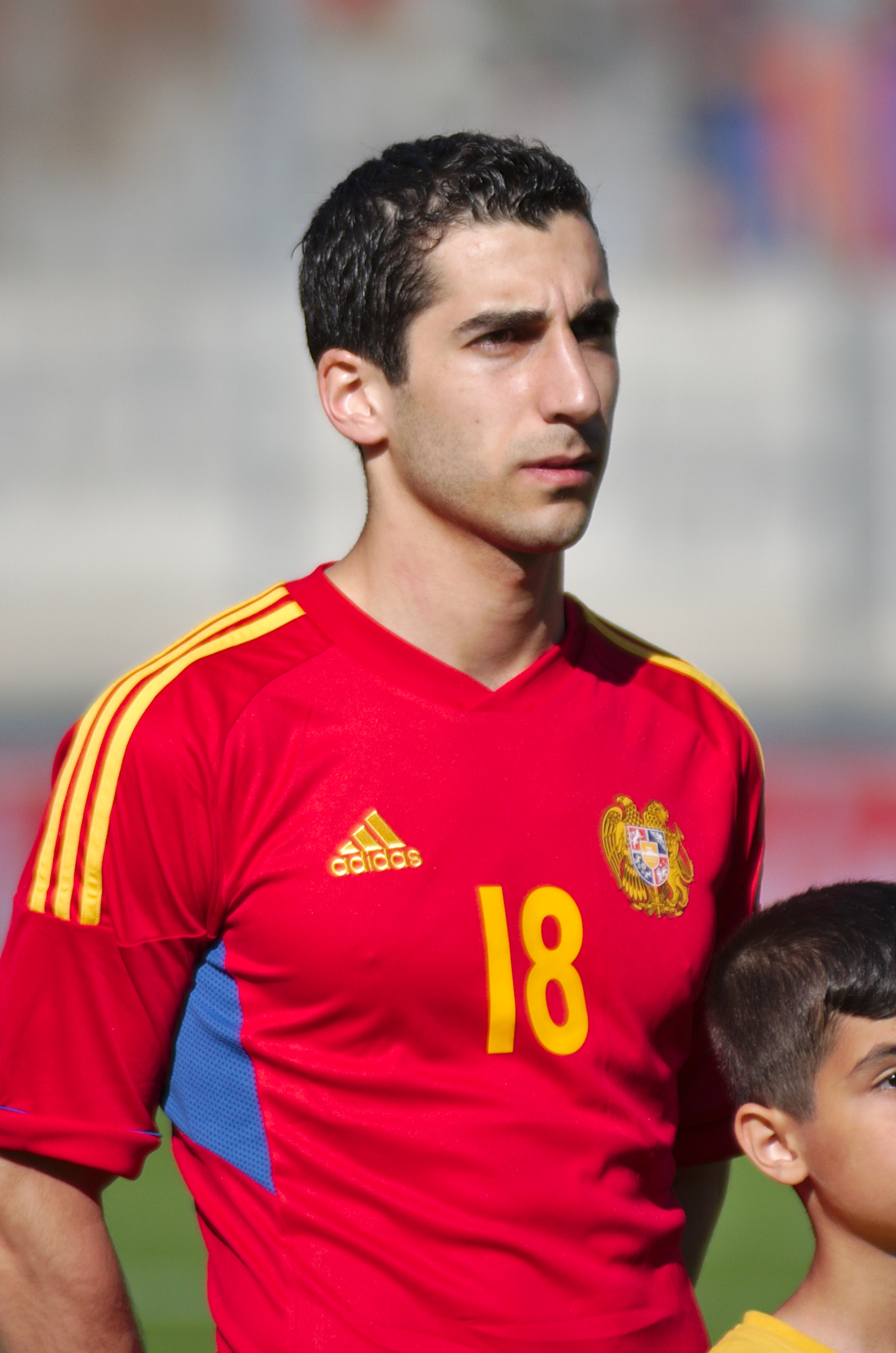
Henrikh Mkhitaryan has been chosen as the Armenian Footballer of the Year twelve times, more than any other player.

Armenian Footballer of the Year is an annual award given to the best professional Armenian football player. The winner is elected by Football Federation of Armenia members, referees, inspectors, coaches, captains and presidents of the Armenian Premier League clubs, as well as the journalists and media. On the same occasion, an award is also given for Armenian Coach of the Year.

== History ==
The same year the Football Federation of Armenia was founded, an award for the best Armenian football player began being annually given. The first award was given to former Armenia national football team captain Sargis Hovsepyan in 1992. Hovsepyan, who became the first player to win the award three times, is currently second to Henrikh Mkhitaryan who has won the award twelve times (including seven times in a row from 2011 to 2017). Arthur Petrosyan and Armen Shahgeldyan have both won the award twice. Edgar Manucharyan became the youngest player to win the award in 2004 at the age of 16. Hovsepyan became the oldest player to win the award in 2008 at the age of 36.

== List of recipients ==
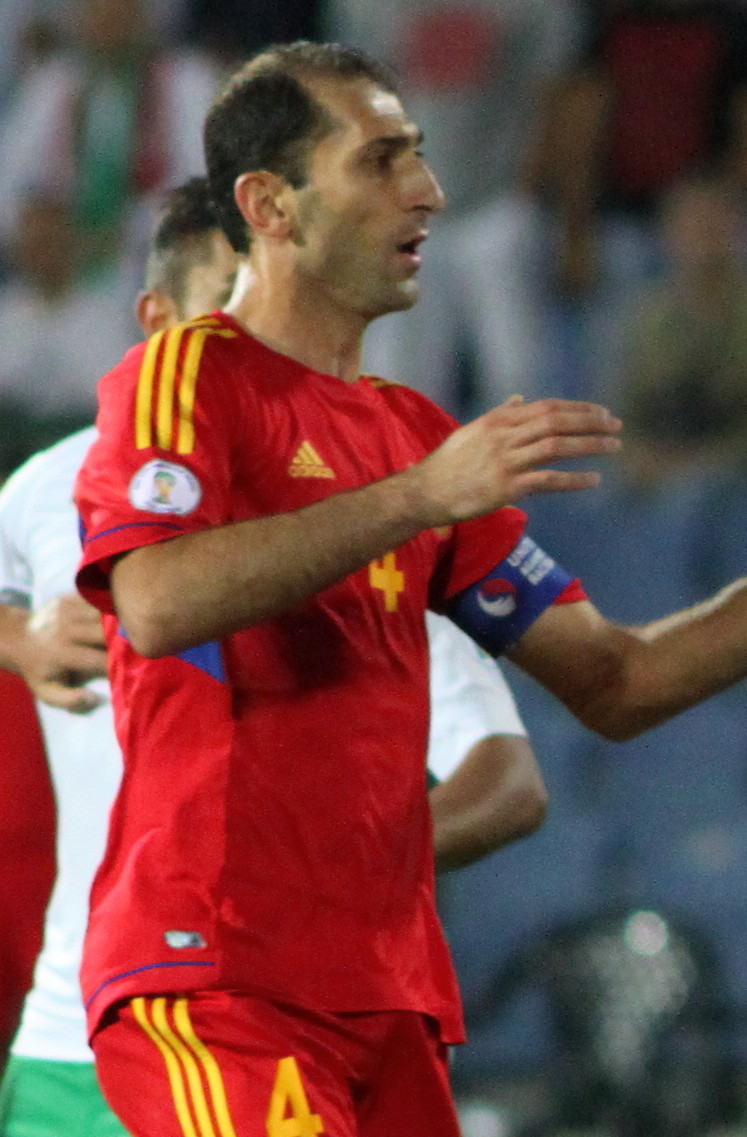
Sargis Hovsepyan won the inaugural award in 1992. He was also the first person to receive the award a second and a third time.

Year	Player	Club	Ref
1992	Sargis Hovsepyan	(Armenia) Pyunik Yerevan	
1993	Armen Shahgeldyan	(Armenia) Ararat Yerevan	
1994	Arsen Avetisyan	(Armenia) Homenetmen	
1995	Sargis Hovsepyan (2)	(Armenia) Pyunik Yerevan	
1996	Arthur Petrosyan	(Armenia) Shirak	
1997	Harutyun Vardanyan	(Armenia) Shirak	
1998	Arthur Voskanyan	(Armenia) Tsement Ararat	
1999	Harutyun Abrahamyan	(Armenia) FC Yerevan	
2000	Arthur Petrosyan (2)	(Switzerland) Young Boys	
2001	Vardan Minasyan	(Armenia) Pyunik Yerevan	
2002	Arman Karamyan	(Armenia) Pyunik Yerevan	
2003	Ara Hakobyan	(Ukraine) Metalurh Donetsk	
2004	Edgar Manucharyan	(Armenia) Pyunik Yerevan	
2005	Aram Hakobyan	(Armenia) Banants Yerevan	
2006	Armen Shahgeldyan (2)	(Armenia) Mika Yerevan	
2007	Levon Pachajyan	(Armenia) Pyunik Yerevan	
2008	Sargis Hovsepyan (3)	(Armenia) Pyunik Yerevan	
2009	Henrikh Mkhitaryan	(Armenia) Pyunik Yerevan	
2010	Karlen Mkrtchyan	(Armenia) Pyunik Yerevan	
2011	Henrikh Mkhitaryan (2)	(Ukraine) Shakhtar Donetsk	
2012	Henrikh Mkhitaryan (3)	(Ukraine) Shakhtar Donetsk	
2013	Henrikh Mkhitaryan (4)	(Germany) Borussia Dortmund	
2014	Henrikh Mkhitaryan (5)	(Germany) Borussia Dortmund	
2015	Henrikh Mkhitaryan (6)	(Germany) Borussia Dortmund	
2016	Henrikh Mkhitaryan (7)	(England) Manchester United	
2017	Henrikh Mkhitaryan (8)	(England) Manchester United	
2018	Marcos Pizzelli	(Kazakhstan) Aktobe	
2019	Henrikh Mkhitaryan (9)	(Italy) Roma	
2020	Henrikh Mkhitaryan (10)	(Italy) Roma	
2021	Varazdat Haroyan	(Spain) Cádiz	
2022	Eduard Spertsyan	(Russia) Krasnodar	
2023	Henrikh Mkhitaryan (11)	(Italy) Inter Milan	
2024	Henrikh Mkhitaryan (12)	(Italy) Inter Milan	
2025	Eduard Spertsyan (2)	(Russia) Krasnodar	

== Number of awards per player ==
Player	Number	Years
Henrikh Mkhitaryan	12	2009, 2011, 2012, 2013, 2014, 2015, 2016, 2017, 2019, 2020, 2023, 2024
Sargis Hovsepyan	3	1992, 1995, 2008
Eduard Spertsyan	2	2022, 2025
Arthur Petrosyan	2	1996, 2000
Armen Shahgeldyan	2	1993, 2006
Harutyun Vardanyan	1	1997
Arthur Voskanyan	1	1998
Harutyun Abrahamyan	1	1999
Vardan Minasyan	1	2001
Arman Karamyan	1	2002
Ara Hakobyan	1	2003
Edgar Manucharyan	1	2004
Aram Hakobyan	1	2005
Levon Pachajyan	1	2007
Karlen Mkrtchyan	1	2010
Marcos Pizzelli	1	2018
Varazdat Haroyan	1	2021
