= 1996–97 Armenian Premier League =

Football league season

Statistics of Armenian Premier League in the 1996–97 season.

- Arabkir Yerevan and BKMA Yerevan are promoted.

== League table ==
Pos	Team	Pld	W	D	L	GF	GA	GD	Pts	Qualification or relegation
1	Pyunik (C)	22	19	2	1	67	9	+58	59	Qualification for the Champions League first qualifying round
2	Ararat Yerevan	22	17	1	4	54	18	+36	52	Qualification for the Cup Winners' Cup qualifying round
3	Yerevan	22	16	2	4	58	24	+34	50	Qualification for the UEFA Cup first qualifying round
4	Shirak	22	15	2	5	57	11	+46	47	
5	Tsement Ararat	22	13	3	6	49	26	+23	42	
6	Van Yerevan	22	11	1	10	41	34	+7	34	
7	Kotayk	22	8	4	10	41	27	+14	28	
8	Karabakh Yerevan	22	7	4	11	23	29	−6	25	
9	Homenmen Yerevan	22	7	1	14	30	59	−29	22	
10	Arabkir (R)	22	4	0	18	20	89	−69	12	Relegation to First League
11	Zangezour (R)	22	2	3	17	9	77	−68	9	Relegation to First League
12	BKMA Yerevan (W)	22	1	1	20	10	56	−46	4	Withdrew (Note: BKMA Yerevan were went into bankruptcy and withdrew from the competition after autumn season. All remaining matches were awarded 3-0 against them.)

Source: RSSSF
(C) Champions; (R) Relegated; (W) Withdrew

== Results ==
Home \ Away	ARB	ARA	BKM	HOM	KAR	KOT	PYU	SHI	TSE	VAN	YER	ZAN
Arabkir		0–3	3–0 (Note: Match awarded.)	2–4	1–2	0–5	0–7	0–10	1–3	1–6	1–4	5–0
Ararat Yerevan	1–0		3–0	2–1	3–1	4–1	0–0	2–0	2–0	2–0	1–3	2–0
BKMA Yerevan	1–2	1–3		0–3	1–2	1–1	0–2	0–3	0–3	0–3	0–3	3–0
Homenmen Yerevan	0–3	0–6	2–1		0–3	0–1	0–5	0–3	0–1	1–5	1–5	5–0
Karabakh Yerevan	3–0	0–3	3–0	0–2		3–2	0–1	0–3	0–1	0–1	1–2	2–2
Kotayk	11–0	1–2	3–0	2–4	3–0		0–1	2–0	1–1	1–2	1–0	3–0
Pyunik	9–1	2–0	3–0	5–0	2–0	0–0		1–0	4–1	3–0	4–1	8–0
Shirak	2–0	4–1	3–0	3–0	1–0	1–0	0–1		4–1	3–0	1–1	7–0
Tsement Ararat	7–0	3–2	3–1	4–1	1–1	3–1	2–3	1–1		5–0	1–2	6–1
Van Yerevan	8–0	0–4	2–1	1–4	0–0	2–1	3–0	0–2	0–1		1–4	6–0
Yerevan	2–0	1–3	3–0	7–2	0–0	3–1	1–4	1–0	1–0	1–0		7–2
Zangezour	1–0	0–5	3–0	0–0	0–2	0–0	0–2	0–6	0–1	0–1	0–6	

Source: RSSSF
Legend: Blue = home team win; Yellow = draw; Red = away team win.

== Top goalscorers ==
Rank	Player		Team	Goals
1	(Armenia)	Arsen Avetisyan	Pyunik	24
2	(Armenia)	Sergey Hayrbabamyan	Tsement Ararat	13
3	(Armenia)	Tigran Yesayan	Yerevan	11
3	(Armenia)	Arthur Petrosyan	Shirak	11
3	(Armenia)	Henrik Berberyan	Yerevan	11

Source: RSSSF

== See also ==
- 1996–97 in Armenian football
- 1996–97 Armenian First League
- 1997 Armenian Cup
