= Zangezour FC =

- Full name: Football Club Zangezour Goris
- Founded: 1982; 44 years ago
- Dissolved: 1997; 29 years ago
- Ground: City Stadium, Goris
- Manager: Seyran Galstyan
- League: -
- 1996-97: 11th in 1996-97

Zangezour FC is a defunct Armenian football club from the city of Goris. The club was founded in 1982.

== History ==
The club began its first season in the independent Armenian league system in 1993, competing in the Armenian First League; it immediately finished first in its group, earning promotion to the country's top division. For the next four seasons, Zangezour was a permanent fixture in the Premier League. In the 1996/97 season, the team finished 11th—second from the bottom—and was slated for relegation to the First League; however, the club instead lost its professional status and was dissolved in 1997.

== Honours ==
- 3-rd place Armenian Premier League (1) : 1995

== Managers ==
- A. Arakelyan (1991)
- Vrezh Davtyan (1994)
- Seyran Petrosyan (1995–1996)
- Feliks Veranyan (??— October 1996)
- Seyran Galstyan (October 1996 — June 1997)
