= Armen Shahgeldyan =

Armenian footballer (born 1973)

Personal information
- Full name: Armen Andranik Shahgeldyan
- Date of birth: 28 August 1973 (age 53)
- Place of birth: Yerevan, Armenian SSR, Soviet Union
- Height: 1.83 m (6 ft 0 in)
- Position: Forward

Team information
- Current team: Alashkert-2 (manager)

Senior career*
Years	Team	Apps	(Gls)
1990–1996	Ararat Yerevan	100	(50)
1996–1997	Pyunik Yerevan	19	(12)
1997	Chornomorets Odesa	2	(0)
1997–1998	Hapoel Petah Tikva	5	(0)
1998	Yerevan	6	(1)
1998–2000	Lausanne-Sport	28	(6)
2000	Dynamo Moscow	4	(0)
2001–2002	Mika Yerevan	16	(4)
2002–2003	Nea Salamis Famagusta	6	(0)
2004	Mika Yerevan	21	(12)
2004–2005	Ahed		(4)
2005–2007	Mika Yerevan	57	(26)
Total		264+	(115)

International career
1992–2007	Armenia	53	(6)

Managerial career
- 2010–2011: Mika Yerevan
- 2019–2020: FC West Armenia
- 2020–2021: Sevan FC
- 2022–: Alashkert-2
- * Club domestic league appearances and goals

Armen Andranik Shahgeldyan (Armenian: Արմեն Անդրանիկի Շահգելդյան; born 28 August 1973) is an Armenian football manager and former player who is the manager of Armenian club Alashkert-2. He played as a striker for the Armenia national team, and finished his career for Armenian Premier League club FC Mika.

Armen debuted for Armenia in 1992, when Armenia played its first international match after gaining independence in a friendly. He has been a member of the national team on and off throughout his career, and has scored six goals in 53 caps. Shahgeldyan was elected twice as the Armenian Footballer of the Year: in 1993 and 2006.

He was the head coach of Mika Yerevan in the 2010 and 2011 seasons of Armenian Premier League.

== Club career ==
At age 16, Armen was in Ararat Yerevan, the color he protected for six years. As part of Ararat, the club won the Armenian Premier League twice in 1993 and 1995 and the Armenian Cup thrice in 1993, 1994, 1995, as well as Shahgeldyan was voted the Armenian Footballer of the Year in 1993.

In 1996, the transition took place in the camp of a rival of the time, to whom was Cilicia, then known as Pyunik Yerevan. Here Armen spent only one season, during which he became the 1996–97 Armenian Premier League champion and 1996–97 Armenian Cup and 1997 Armenian Supercup finalist.

The next two seasons he spent abroad, try his hand at Ukrainian and Israeli championships, but neither the first nor the second show itself could not. Followed after the first return to his homeland. In 1998, he played for FC Yerevan, which included the 1998 Armenian Premier League bronze medalist and 1998 Armenian Cup finalist. At the end of the Armenian Premier League, he receives an offer from a Swiss club Lausanne Sports, which is contracting. For three seasons, he played for the club. Shahgeldyan appeared in 26 games and scored 6 goals. The situation was similar in Dynamo Moscow, where over half of the season Shahgeldyan appeared on the field just twice.

In 2001, the second return home occurred for Shahgeldyan. Armen was home to Mika Yerevan. After crossing, half of the season took place in Cyprus.

In 2004, again in Mika, for which conducts a full season, playing in 21 games and scoring 12 goals in them (5th place in the season). At the end of the year was the last departure to a foreign club, Al Ahed, where spent the beginning of the season and then once again moved to the Mika. The last two and a half seasons of his playing career spent in the Ashtarak club, which included two Armenian Cup in 2005, 2006 and one Armenian Supercup in 2006 and recognized as the Armenian Footballer of the Year for a second time in 2006 and the best forward in 2005.

== International career ==
Armen debuted in the Armenia national football team first team in 1992. It was the first match of the team since the independence of Armenia. The match was a friendly against the national team of Moldova, and ended with a score of a zero tie. From now until the end of his playing career in 2007, Armen constantly received calls in the national team. During this time, he played in 53 games, 8th place or all time, and scored 6 goals, 7th place or all time.

== Managerial career ==
Shahgeldyan graduated from the high school of coaches in Moscow. Since 2008, the head of FC Mika-2. In the first 2010 Armenian Premier League match of the season, the club was fined 50,000 drams marked "For constant interference in the match referee from the head coach," Mickey-2 "while playing his charges with Shirak FC-2." Due to the unsatisfactory results of Mika, head coach Armen Adamyan left. In the place the head coach took Armen Shahgeldyan. With the advent Shahgeldyan, results changed. The team often began the trick, but it was not enough to win medals. The new season again entrusted Shahgeldyan. The team was periodically thrown to the side. Therefore, the team managed to win the Cup after a long period. However, the results of the championship outweighed Cups to Shahgeldyan and he had to leave. On the occasion of the removal of the head coach of Mika from office, the vacancy was offered Markarova.

== Personal life ==
Shahgeldyan has a son, Andranik, who is also a football player. Andranik played for FC Mika in the first team as a forward during the time Armen was head coach. After the departure of his father as head coach, he went to Ulisses FC for the end of the season.

== Career statistics ==
=== International ===
Armenia national team
Year	Apps	Goals
1992	1	0
1993	0	0
1994	3	0
1995	6	2
1996	2	0
1997	1	0
1998	4	0
1999	8	2
2000	5	0
2001	4	0
2002	1	1
2003	1	0
2004	3	1
2005	5	0
2006	4	0
2007	5	0
Total	53	6

List of international goals scored by Armen Shahgeldyan
#	Date	Venue	Opponent	Score	Result	Competition
1.	10 May 1995	Hrazdan Stadium, Yerevan, Armenia	Macedonia	2–2	Draw	Euro 1996 qualifying
2.	6 September 1995	Gradski Stadion, Skopje, Macedonia	Macedonia	1–2	Win	Euro 1996 qualifying
3.	8 September 1999	Hrazdan Stadium, Yerevan, Armenia	France	2–3	Loss	Euro 2000 qualifying
4.	9 October 1999	Estadi Comunal d'Aixovall, Aixovall, Andorra	Andorra	0–3	Win	Euro 2000 qualifying
5.	7 June 2002	Estadi Comunal, Andorra la Vella, Andorra	Andorra	0–2	Win	Friendly
6.	9 October 2004	Tampere Stadium, Tampere, Finland	Finland	3–1	Loss	2006 World Cup qualifying
Correct as of 13 January 2018

== Honours ==
=== Player ===
Ararat Yerevan

- Armenian Premier League: 1993, 1995
- Armenian Cup: 1993, 1994, 1995

Pyunik Yerevan

- Armenian Premier League: 1996–97
- Armenian Cup runner-up: 1996–97
- Armenian Supercup runner-up: 1997

FC Yerevan

- Armenian Cup runner-up: 1998

Mika Yerevan

- Armenian Cup: 2005, 2006
- Armenian Supercup: 2006; runner-up: 2004, 2007

Lausanne-Sport

- Swiss Cup: 1998, 1999

Individual

- Armenian Footballer of the Year: 1993, 2006
- Best Forward of Armenia: 2004, 2005
- Lebanese Premier League Team of the Season: 2004–05

=== Manager ===
Mika

- Armenian Cup: 2011
