= Harutyun Vardanyan =

Armenian footballer (born 1970)

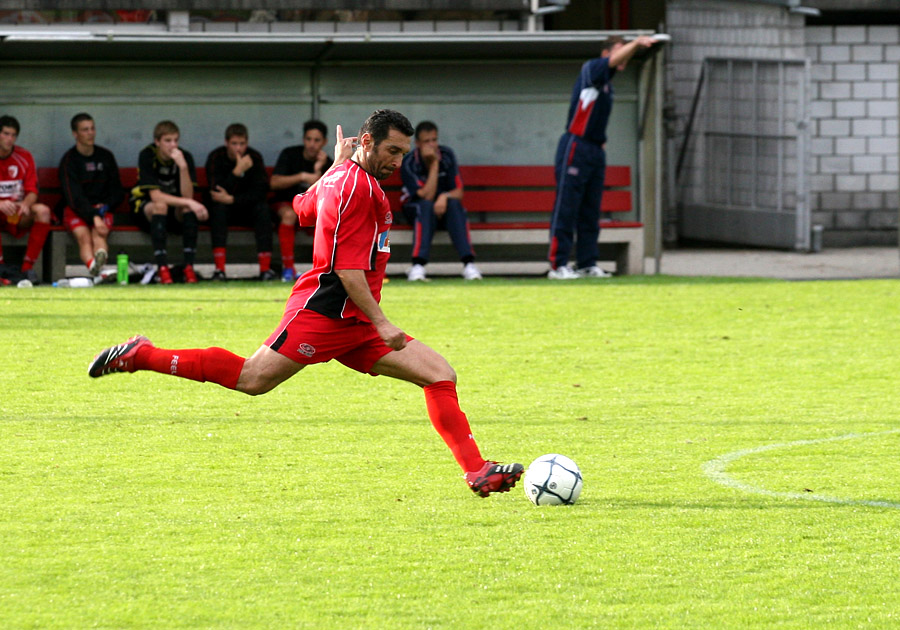
- Vardanyan in 2006

Personal information
- Full name: Harutyun Vardanyan
- Date of birth: 5 December 1970 (age 55)
- Place of birth: Gyumri, Armenian SSR, Soviet Union
- Height: 1.83 m (6 ft 0 in)
- Position: Centre back

Youth career
- 1988–1989: Lori Vanadzor

Senior career*
Years	Team	Apps	(Gls)
1989–1997	Shirak Gyumri	225	(56)
1998–1999	Lausanne Sports	7	(0)
1999–2000	Fortuna Köln	33	(1)
2000–2003	Young Boys Berne	98	(5)
2003–2004	Servette Geneva	28	(0)
2004–2006	FC Aarau	37	(0)
2006–2007	Biel-Bienne	15	(5)

International career
1994–2004	Armenia	62	(1)

Managerial career
- Western Armenia
- * Club domestic league appearances and goals

Harutyun Vardanyan (Armenian: Հարություն Վարդանյան, born 5 December 1970 in Gyumri, Armenian SSR) is an Armenian former footballer who played as a defender for the Armenia national football team and for Armenian, Swiss and German clubs. He spent most of his club career in the Swiss Super League, playing for Lausanne, Young Boys, Servette, and Aarau. Vardanyan played 62 international matches and scored one goal for the Armenia national team, making his debut in an away friendly match on 15 May 1994.

== Club career ==
Harutyun Vardanyan was born in Leninakan (now Gyumri), but began his career as a football player in Lori Vanadzor. In 1989, he returned to Leninakan, where he played for the local Shirak Gyumri. It is for this club Vardanyan played the most seasons and matches in the history of the club. As part of Shirak, Vardanyan won the Armenian Premier League three times and the Armenian Supercup once. In 1997, he was voted the Armenian Footballer of the Year. This season was the last in his career for his native club, for which he spent 9 years playing. That year, he signed a contract with Lausanne Sports, where he played for a season. He then moved to Cologne, where he played for Fortuna Köln. Vardanyan stayed at Fortuna Köln for two seasons, then returned to Switzerland and played for Young Boys Berne.

In 2003, he moved to the Servette Geneva. As part of Geneva, Vardanyan won bronze medals of the Swiss Super League. This success was the only 10-year-old Swiss career Vardanyan. After the end of the season, he moved to Aarau, where he continued to play for the club of the same name, FC Aarau. In early February 2005, Vardanyan was injured in a test match between Aarau and FC Seoul, which left him out of football for six months. In 2006, he moved to the club's first league FC Biel-Bienne, in which he ended his playing career. In total, Vardanyan had 524 matches at an official level, scoring 68 goals.

== International career ==
Vardanyan's first match for the Armenia national football team happened on 15 May 1994 in an away game, the second game for Armenia in its history; against the national team of the United States. The only goal for the national team Vardanyan had was a goal against Albania in a home game on 6 September 1997. On 29 August 2005, in part to match against the Netherlands and the Czech Republic for the first time after a long break caused by trauma, figured Vardanyan. However, not having played any first-or second-in games, Vardanyan was included in a list of players for the next qualifying match for the 2006 FIFA World Cup qualification match against Andorra, though expressed his desire not to play for. Thus, he last played for the national team on 17 November 2004 in a 2006 FIFA World Cup qualification match against Romania.

== Legal incident ==
In April 2007, Harutyun Vardanyan was placed in pre-trial detention by Swiss police for cases involving fines. Causes and circumstances of these penalties in the Swiss media had not been reported. Jean-Marc Hofstetter, President of FC Biel Bienne, for which at the time Vardanyan played for, was surprised by the event. In the end, it turned out that Vardanyan was arrested because he gave 4 people a ride in his Mercedes. Three did not have the right to enter the territory of Switzerland and the 4th came to watch the game of football club Biel-Bienne advocated by Vardanyan. However, the latter in no way influenced the police. Vardanyan was supported by the players, coaches and club management.

== Personal life ==
Vardanyan and his family moved from Switzerland to the town of Mont-de-Marsan, France, in 2010. He is the owner and the operator of a small café on one of the central squares in the French town.

== National team statistics ==
Armenia national team
Year	Apps	Goals
1994	4	0
1995	5	0
1996	9	0
1997	7	1
1998	4	0
1999	7	0
2000	6	0
2001	7	0
2002	2	0
2003	6	0
2004	5	0
Total	62	1

== Honours ==
=== Club ===
Shirak Gyumri

- Armenian Premier League (3): 1992, 1994, 1995
- Armenian Supercup (1): 1996
- Armenian Premier League Runner-up (3): 1993, 1995–96, 1997
- Armenian Cup Runner-up (2): 1993, 1994

=== Individual ===
- Armenian Footballer of the Year: 1997
