= Artur Voskanyan =

Armenian footballer (born 1976)

Personal information
- Date of birth: 13 August 1976 (age 50)
- Place of birth: Yerevan, Armenian SSR, Soviet Union
- Height: 1.83 m (6 ft 0 in)
- Position: Defensive midfielder

Team information
- Current team: Noravank (academy manager)

Youth career
- DYuSSh Echmiadzin

Senior career*
Years	Team	Apps	(Gls)
1993–1994	SKA-Arai Etchmiadzin	37	(0)
1995–1997	Van Yerevan	39	(3)
1997	Karabakh Yerevan	17	(1)
1998	Tsement Ararat	22	(4)
1999–2000	Uralan Elista	33	(2)
2001	Spartak Yerevan	14	(5)
2002	Banants Yerevan	3	(1)
2002–2003	Digenis Morphou	25	(4)
2003–2004	Ethnikos Achna	21	(2)
2004–2006	Pyunik Yerevan	44	(7)
2006	Kilikia Yerevan	0	(0)
2007	Ararat Yerevan	24	(0)
2008	Vitebsk	21	(0)
2009–2011	Banants Yerevan	42	(2)

International career
1999–2010	Armenia	51	(1)

Managerial career
- 2011–2013: Banants Yerevan (assistant)
- 2013–2014: Armenia U17
- 2016: Armenia U17
- 2016–2017: Banants Yerevan
- 2016–2018: Armenia U21
- 2018–2019: Armenia U19
- 2021–: Noravank (academy)
- * Club domestic league appearances and goals

Artur Voskanyan (Armenian: Արթուր Ոսկանյան, born 13 August 1976) is an Armenian football coach and former player who is the manager of the academy of Noravank.

== Club career ==
Artur Voskanyan began his career in Zvartnots Echmiadzin, for which he played 11 games in his first season. At that time, he was still 17 years old. Zvartnots soon had a number of unsuccessful performances and soon became SKA-Arai Echmiadzin and was demoted from the Armenian Premier League to the Armenian First League. After leaving the club, Voskanyan moved to Van Yerevan. He managed to play only two seasons for Van, as the club was disbanded after the 1996–97 season.

In 1998, Voskanyan joined Tsement Ararat. The club won the 1998 Armenian Premier League that season and also the 1998 Armenian Cup and 1998 Armenian Supercup. Voskanyan was given the Armenian Footballer of the Year award in 1998 by the Football Federation of Armenia.

== International career ==
Voskanyan debuted in the Armenia national team on 27 March 1999 in a home UEFA Euro 2000 qualifying match against Russia, in which Armenia was defeated 3–0. Over his entire time playing for the Armenia national squad, he made 52 appearances and scored one goal in a game against the Maltese national team.

In March 2010, Voskanyan was invited to the national team after having last played a year before. He left the national team that same year.

== Managerial career ==
On 8 December 2015 he has appointed as Head coach of Armenia under-17 football team.

== Personal life ==
Artur is married and has two children, a girl and a boy. His younger brother, Ara Voskanyan, was also a football player.

== Career statistics ==
Appearances and goals by national team and year
National team	Year	Apps	Goals
Armenia	1999	6	0
Armenia	2000	5	0
Armenia	2001	4	0
Armenia	2002	2	0
Armenia	2003	7	0
Armenia	2004	2	0
Armenia	2005	1	0
Armenia	2006	2	0
Armenia	2007	8	1
Armenia	2008	10	0
Armenia	2009	2	0
Armenia	2010	2	0
Total		51	1

== Honours ==
Tsement Ararat

- Armenian Premier League: 1998; third place 2001
- Armenian Cup: 1998
- Armenian Supercup: 1998

Banants Yerevan

- Armenian Premier League runner-up: 2010; third place 2002
- Armenian Cup runner-up: 2009, 2010
- Armenian Supercup runner-up: 2010

Pyunik Yerevan

- Armenian Premier League: 2005, 2006
- Armenian Cup runner-up: 2006
- Armenian Supercup: 2005; runner-up 2006

Ararat Yerevan

- Armenian Cup runner-up: 2007

Individual

- Armenian Footballer of the Year: 1998
