= Henrikh Mkhitaryan =

Armenian footballer (born 1989)

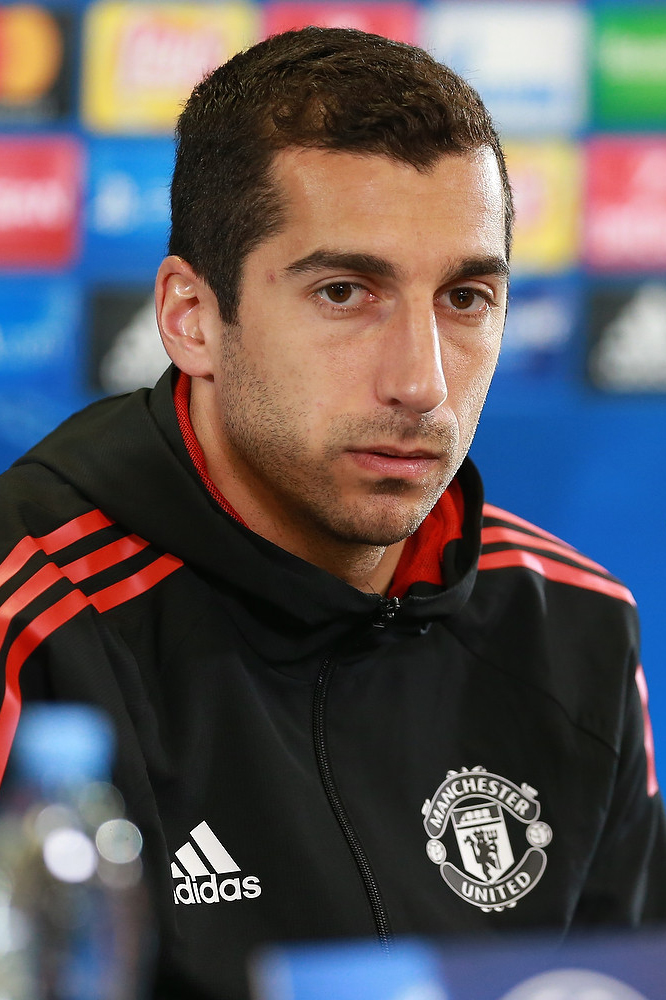
- Mkhitaryan with Manchester United in 2017

Personal information
- Full name: Henrikh Mkhitaryan
- Date of birth: 21 January 1989 (age 37)
- Place of birth: Yerevan, Armenian SSR, Soviet Union
- Height: 1.77 m (5 ft 10 in)
- Positions: Central midfielder; attacking midfielder

Team information
- Current team: Inter Milan
- Number: 22

Youth career
- 1995–2006: Pyunik

Senior career*
Years	Team	Apps	(Gls)
2006–2009	Pyunik	70	(30)
2009–2010	Metalurh Donetsk	37	(12)
2010–2013	Shakhtar Donetsk	72	(38)
2013–2016	Borussia Dortmund	90	(23)
2016–2018	Manchester United	39	(5)
2018–2020	Arsenal	39	(8)
2019–2020	→ Roma (loan)	22	(9)
2020–2022	Roma	65	(18)
2022–	Inter Milan	136	(10)

International career
2006–2007	Armenia U17	5	(1)
2007–2008	Armenia U19	6	(1)
2008–2010	Armenia U21	13	(9)
2007–2021	Armenia	95	(32)
- * Club domestic league appearances and goals as of 22:22, 22 November 2026 (UTC)

Henrikh Mkhitaryan (Armenian: Հենրիխ Մխիթարյան [hɛnˈɾiχ məχitʰɑˈɾjɑn]; born 21 January 1989) is an Armenian professional footballer who plays as a midfielder for Serie A club Inter Milan. He is the all time top goalscorer for the Armenia national team.

Mkhitaryan won four Armenian Premier League titles with Pyunik, and joined Metalurh Donetsk in 2009; he moved to city rivals Shakhtar Donetsk in 2010 for €6.1 million. At Shakhtar, Mkhitaryan set the league goalscoring record in the 2012–13 season, and was named the league's Footballer of the Year. After also winning three domestic doubles, he signed for Bundesliga club Borussia Dortmund for a club-record fee of €27.5 million, making him the most expensive Armenian player of all time.

There, he won a DFL-Supercup in 2014, and in the following campaign, registered the most assists in the Bundesliga, with 15, the second most in Europe. He then joined Manchester United for £30 million (€34.3 million), becoming the first Armenian to play in the Premier League. He won the FA Community Shield, and scored the winner to win the UEFA Europa League title. Mkhitaryan was then signed by Arsène Wenger for Arsenal in a swap-deal including Alexis Sánchez in 2018, and then to Serie A club Roma on an initial loan, where he signed permanently in 2020 before joining Internazionale in 2022.

Mkhitaryan was a member of the senior side in his native country from 2007 until his international retirement in 2022. He is Armenia's all-time top goalscorer, scoring 32 goals in 95 matches, as well as registering their first hat-trick. He has been named Armenian Footballer of the Year twelve times, including seven years consecutively from 2011 to 2017. Mkhitaryan was also voted the CIS Footballer of the Year in 2012 and 2013, making him the first Armenian footballer to be named the best player from the post-Soviet countries.

== Early life ==
Mkhitaryan was born on 21 January 1989 in the Soviet Armenian capital city of Yerevan to Marina Taschyan and Hamlet Mkhitaryan. His father was a prominent striker for FC Ararat Yerevan during the 1980s, who died of a brain tumor at age 33 when Henrikh was seven years old. His mother was half Armenian and half Russian from Moscow.

The death of his father impacted Mkhitaryan significantly. He feels that if his father was still alive that "everything would be different." He gave him useful advice from a professional point of view. People who have watched Mkhitaryan and his father, say that their styles resemble each other very much. He has said, "I believe he sees me and is proud of me..." His mother is the head of the national teams department in the Armenian Football Federation and his elder sister, Monika, works at UEFA's headquarters.

At the beginning of the 1990s, the Mkhitaryan family moved to France, where Hamlet Mkhitaryan played for the now defunct ASOA Valence and helped them to be promoted to the second division. Mkhitaryan spent his early childhood in Valence. He always wanted to become a football player and began to follow in his father's footsteps. As a child, he would watch his father play and always wanted to follow him to training. The Mkhitaryans returned to Yerevan in 1995. In the same year, Mkhitaryan joined the youth system of FC Pyunik. He graduated from the Institute of Physical Culture in Armenia. He studied economics at the Yerevan branch of the St. Petersburg Institute. Upon graduation, he planned to study there as a lawyer. In 2003, at the age of 14, Mkhitaryan had trials with São Paulo in Brazil where he played alongside the likes of Hernanes and Oscar. He returned to Pyunik in 2004, then manager Mihai Stoichiță insisted on his return to Armenia. Growing up, Mkhitaryan considered Zinedine Zidane his football idol.

== Club career ==
=== Pyunik ===
Mkhitaryan joined the FC Pyunik youth system in 1995 and received his first salary at the age of 15. He was later promoted to the first team of FC Pyunik, making his professional debut in 2006 at the age of 17. He last played for the club in the 2009 season. During that season he scored 11 league goals in 10 league games. In his four seasons in the Pyunik first team, they won the Armenian Premier League on four occasions (2006, 2007, 2008 and 2009). They also won the Armenian Supercup twice (2007 and 2009) and the Armenian Cup once (2009). Armenia national football team and Pyunik head coach Vardan Minasyan admitted that he would love to see his star player "playing in a stronger league." Minasyan stated young Henrikh was well on his way to becoming a legend in his own right. He said of Mkhitaryan, "He can win games on his own. He seizes control at the crucial moment and scores for fun."

Due to his success in the 2009 Armenian Premier League at FC Pyunik, he joined Ukrainian Premier League club Metalurh Donetsk.

=== Metalurh Donetsk ===
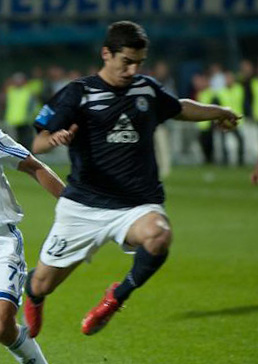
Mkhitaryan playing for Metalurh Donetsk in 2009

Mkhitaryan joined Metalurh Donetsk in 2009. He scored a goal on his debut in a 3–0 victory against Belarusian Premier League side FC Partizan Minsk, in the Europa League on 16 July 2009. On 19 July 2009, he made his league debut in a 0–0 draw with Dnipro Dnipropetrovsk. His first league goal came in a 2–2 draw with Karpaty Lviv on 26 July 2009. On 6 August 2009, he scored the first goal in a 3–0 second leg Europa League win against Slovenian club Interblock Ljubljana, winning 5–0 on aggregate.

The following season he was named captain of the club on 14 July 2010, at the age 21, making him the youngest captain in Metalurh Donetsk history. He scored his first goal of the season, an 89th-minute penalty, in a 3–0 victory over Obolon Kyiv on 16 July 2010. He played his final match for the club in a 2–1 win against Dnipro on 30 August 2010. In his second season, he played eight matches and scored three goals, all of which were in the league. He made 37 league appearances during his time at Metalurh, scoring 12 goals. In total he played 45 matches for the club, scoring 16 times.

=== Shakhtar Donetsk ===
==== 2010–13: League wins and Golden Boot ====
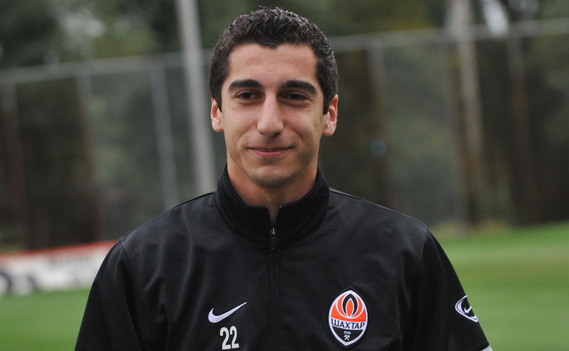
Mkhitaryan training with Shakhtar Donetsk in 2010

On 30 August 2010, he sealed a $7.5 million switch to reigning Premier League champions Shakhtar Donetsk. Before signing with Shakhtar, Mkhitaryan was in trial with Iran Pro League side Mes Kerman which he was rejected by head coach Samad Marfavi. His debut came on 10 September 2010 in a 1–0 away league defeat to Obolon Kyiv, being replaced after 62 minutes by Eduardo. His home debut was more successful, with Shakhtar coming back from a goal behind to win 4–1 against Tavriya Simferopol on 19 September 2010. He scored his first goal for the club in this match. Three days later he made his first appearance in the Ukrainian Cup, netting the second goal in a 6–0 win over Kryvbas. On 25 September 2010, he scored a late injury time winner in a 2–1 away victory over Metalist Kharkiv. He made his European debut for the club in the Champions League on 28 September 2010 against Sporting Braga winning 3–0. He made an appearance in the 2–0 Ukrainian Cup Final victory against Dynamo Kyiv, coming on in the 81st minute in place of Jádson. His first season with the club was extremely successful for Shakhtar as they won the treble (Premier League, Ukrainian Cup and the Super Cup).

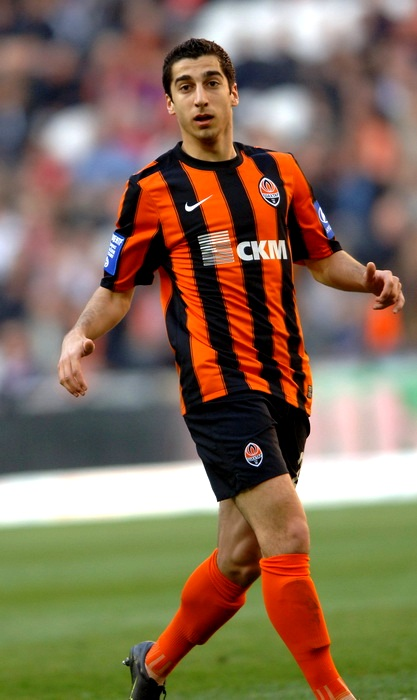
Mkhitaryan playing for Shakhtar Donetsk in 2011

In the 2011–12 season Shakhtar won the Premier League and the Ukrainian Cup. Mkhitaryan scored the third goal in a 4–0 win against Obolon Kyiv in his first league match of the season. On 4 March 2012, he scored the equalizing goal in a 1–1 draw with Dnipro Dnipropetrovsk. He scored the only goal in a cup victory over Metalurh Zaporizhya on 11 April 2012. On 6 May 2012, he played a part in Shakhtar's 2–1 extra time victory over his former team Metalurh Donetsk in the Ukrainian Cup Final, coming off after 62 minutes for Douglas Costa. In an online poll on Shakhtar Donetsk's official website, Mkhitaryan was voted as the best player of Shakhtar in 2011–12 Premier League season with about 38% of total votes. He scored 11 goals in 37 matches, including 10 goals in 26 league matches. Shakhtar retained the Premier League and the Ukrainian Cup in the 2011–12 season.

"It wasn't easy for him from the start, but his integration was speeded up by his high level of football intelligence. His game awareness is perhaps his most valuable quality – that and the speed and power and technique Henrikh was gifted by nature and that he's developed. Because of those virtues, he's one of the players who most consistently fulfils the tasks set by the coaching staff. Working with him is fun."

— Mircea Lucescu, Mkhitaryan's manager at Shakhtar Donetsk in June 2013

Mkhitaryan played in Shakhtar's 2–0 2012 Super Cup victory over Metalurh Donetsk. In his first match of the 2012–13 Premier League season, he scored twice and provided two assists in a 6–0 season opening victory against Arsenal Kyiv. He managed a hat-trick against Chornomorets Odesa in a 5–1 win to reach 10 goals for the season after just six games, equaling his tally for the previous season. On 19 September 2012, in Shakhtar's first Champions League match of the season, Mkhitaryan scored twice in a 2–0 victory over Danish champions Nordsjælland. This was the first time he had scored a goal in the Champions League and he was named Man of the Match. He was also named in the Team of the Week for match day 1 of the Champions League after his brace against Nordsjælland. On 16 March 2013, Mkhitaryan played his 100th game in the Ukrainian Premier League in a match against Chornomorets Odesa.

On 11 May 2013, Mkhitaryan scored his 23rd and 24th goals of the Premier League season in a 5–0 victory over Tavria. These goals set a Ukrainian Premier League record for most goals in a season. Mkhitaryan finished the season with 25 league goals, and the attacking midfielder was praised for his technique and dedication.

=== Borussia Dortmund ===
On 25 June 2013, Borussia Dortmund made a €23 million bid, but in confirming the offer Shakhtar Donetsk CEO Sergei Palkin insisted that it fell short of the club's valuation, which was a single payment of €30 million. On 5 July 2013, it was reported that Borussia Dortmund had succeeded in talks with Shakhtar and Mkhitaryan was on his way to Germany for a medical test. On 8 July 2013, Borussia Dortmund announced that it was set to sign a four-year deal with Mkhitaryan for €25 million Shakhtar and Borussia officially "resolved all the necessary formalities" and agreed on €27.5 million, making him the most expensive purchase in the club's history.

==== 2013–14: Debut season ====
On his debut in a pre-season friendly against FC Basel on 10 July 2013, Mkhitaryan set up a goal for Marco Reus in the 11th minute and scored his first goal for the club 16 minutes later, helping his side to a 3–1 victory away at St. Jakob-Park. Mkhitaryan couldn't take part and wasn't listed in the squad at the 2013 DFL-Supercup which his club won due to an injury he received on a friendly game before that. Mkhitaryan debuted for Dortmund following his return from a three weeks sustained injury in the second round of 2013–14 Bundesliga on 18 August 2013 in a home victory over Eintracht Braunschweig at Signal Iduna Park. Mkhitaryan's first two Bundesliga goals were decisive in a 2–1 win over Eintracht Frankfurt to keep Dortmund in first place in the Bundesliga. His first Champions League goal for Dortmund came in a 2–1 away win against Arsenal.

Mkhitaryan finished his season with nine goals and ten assists in the Bundesliga and was included in the WhoScored Bundesliga Team of the Season. His team finished runner-up at the 2013–14 Bundesliga, and runner-up for the 2013–14 DFB-Pokal.

==== 2014–16: DFL-Supercup and top assist provider ====
The first trophy Mkhitaryan won with Dortmund was the 2014 DFL-Supercup, scoring the first goal in the 2–0 victory over Bayern Munich. In September 2014, Mkhitaryan suffered an injury that sidelined him for a month and on 13 December 2014 he was injured again. He scored the second goal of a 3–0 win against rivals Schalke 04 on 28 February 2015.

On 6 August 2015, Dortmund played against Wolfsberger AC in the third qualifying round second leg of the Europa League, Thomas Tuchel's first home match as coach. Mkhitaryan scored a late hat-trick for a 5–0 victory, 6–0 on aggregate. Three days later, he scored the second goal in a 2–0 win at 3. Liga club Chemnitzer FC in the first round of the DFB-Pokal. On 15 August 2015, Mkhitaryan scored a brace in a 4–0 win against Borussia Mönchengladbach in the first league game of the season. Five days later, he headed the winning goal as Dortmund came from 3–0 down to win 4–3 at Odds BK in the first leg of their Europa League play-off.

In the second round of the domestic cup on 28 October 2015, Mkhitaryan scored the final goal of a 7–1 rout of SC Paderborn 07. Eight days later, his goal confirmed a 4–0 home win over Gabala FK, securing a place in the last 32 of the Europa League.

On 20 April 2016, Mkhitaryan was one of three goalscorers as Borussia won 3–0 away at Hertha BSC in the semi-final of the DFB-Pokal.

At the end of the season, Mkhitaryan was voted the Bundesliga Players' Player of the Season. He finished the league as the assist leader with 15 assists.

=== Manchester United ===
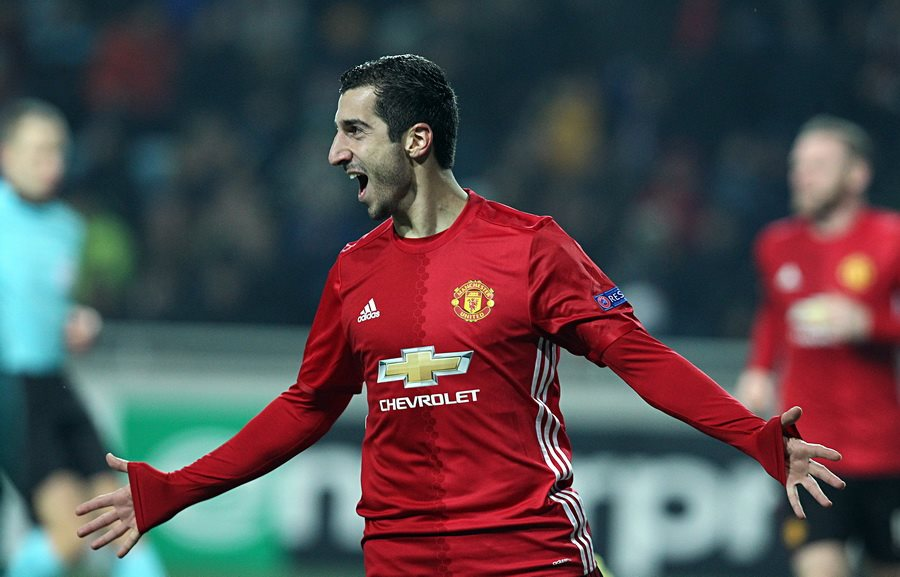
Mkhitaryan celebrating scoring a goal for Manchester United in 2016

On 2 July 2016, Dortmund chief executive Hans-Joachim Watzke said that the sale of Mkhitaryan to England's Manchester United would be inevitable as the player would leave for free had he stayed one more year. Four days later, Mkhitaryan joined them on a four-year contract for a transfer fee reported variously as between £27 million and £30 million, with the option to extend for a further year. He became the first Armenian to join a Premier League club.

Mkhitaryan made his debut in a 2–0 victory in a pre-season match against Wigan Athletic on 15 July 2016. On 7 August 2016, he made his competitive debut as a stoppage-time substitute in a 2–1 victory against Leicester City in the 2016 FA Community Shield. He became the first Armenian to play in the Premier League on 14 August 2016 when he came on as a 75th-minute substitute for Juan Mata in a 3–1 away victory against AFC Bournemouth. He made his first Premier League start for Manchester United in the Manchester derby on 10 September 2016, but he was substituted at half-time.

On 8 December 2016, Mkhitaryan scored his first goal for the club, away against Zorya Luhansk, in Manchester United's last group match of the Europa League. Three days later, in United's next game, Mkhitaryan scored his first Premier League goal (and his first goal at Old Trafford) in a 1–0 victory over Tottenham Hotspur; however, he left the game in the second half after suffering an ankle injury in a tackle by Danny Rose. He returned from this injury two matches later, coming off the bench to score United's third goal against Sunderland, a scorpion kick which he described as being the best goal he had ever scored. In a UEFA Europa League tie against AS Saint-Étienne on 22 February 2017, Mkhitaryan scored but then went off injured. As a result, he missed the 2017 EFL Cup Final. He scored in the 2017 Europa League final to help Manchester United beat Ajax 2–0, and became the first Armenian to win a major European trophy.

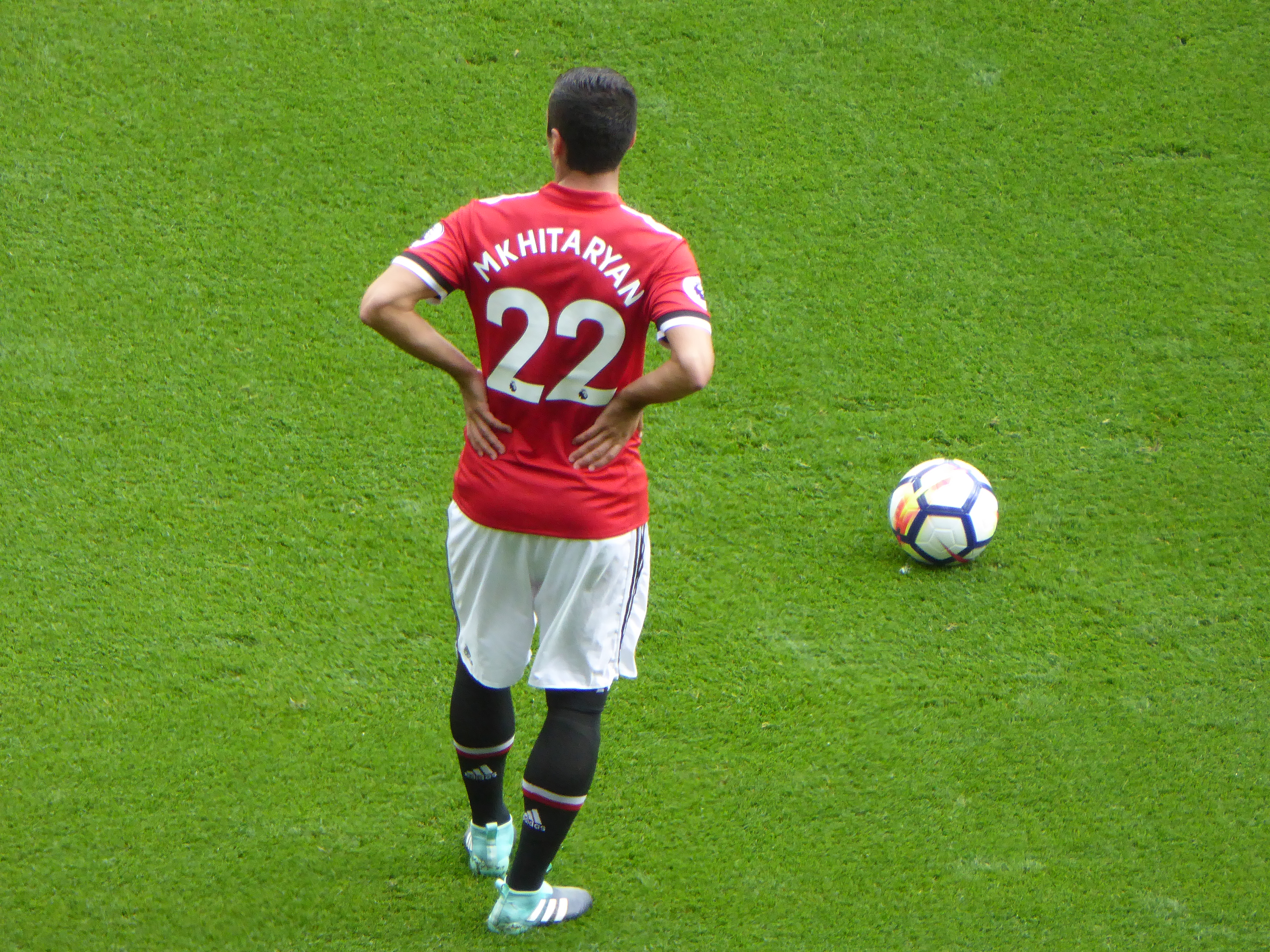
Mkhitaryan preparing to take a free kick against West Ham United during the 2017–18 Premier League

In the first three matches of the 2017–18 Premier League season, Mkhitaryan assisted a record-equalling five goals. Two days later, he scored his first goal of the season in a 4–0 victory over Everton. He scored his first Champions League goal for Manchester United ten days later in a 4–1 away win against CSKA Moscow. However, following a run of poor form, Mkhitaryan was dropped from the starting line-up during United's 4–1 victory over Newcastle United. He returned for the following match against Brighton and Hove Albion but then faced a five Premier League match absence from the squad. He returned to the squad for three games in late December but was dropped again for his final three United games. During this period, Mkhitaryan's relationship with manager José Mourinho reportedly became strained, with Mourinho publicly questioning his consistency and contribution to the team. According to The Guardian, the pair's differences over playing style and work rate contributed to Mkhitaryan's eventual departure from Manchester United. Mkhitaryan later revealed in his book, "La mia vita sempre al centro" (My Life Always at the Center), that Mourinho had even texted him to leave the club.

=== Arsenal ===
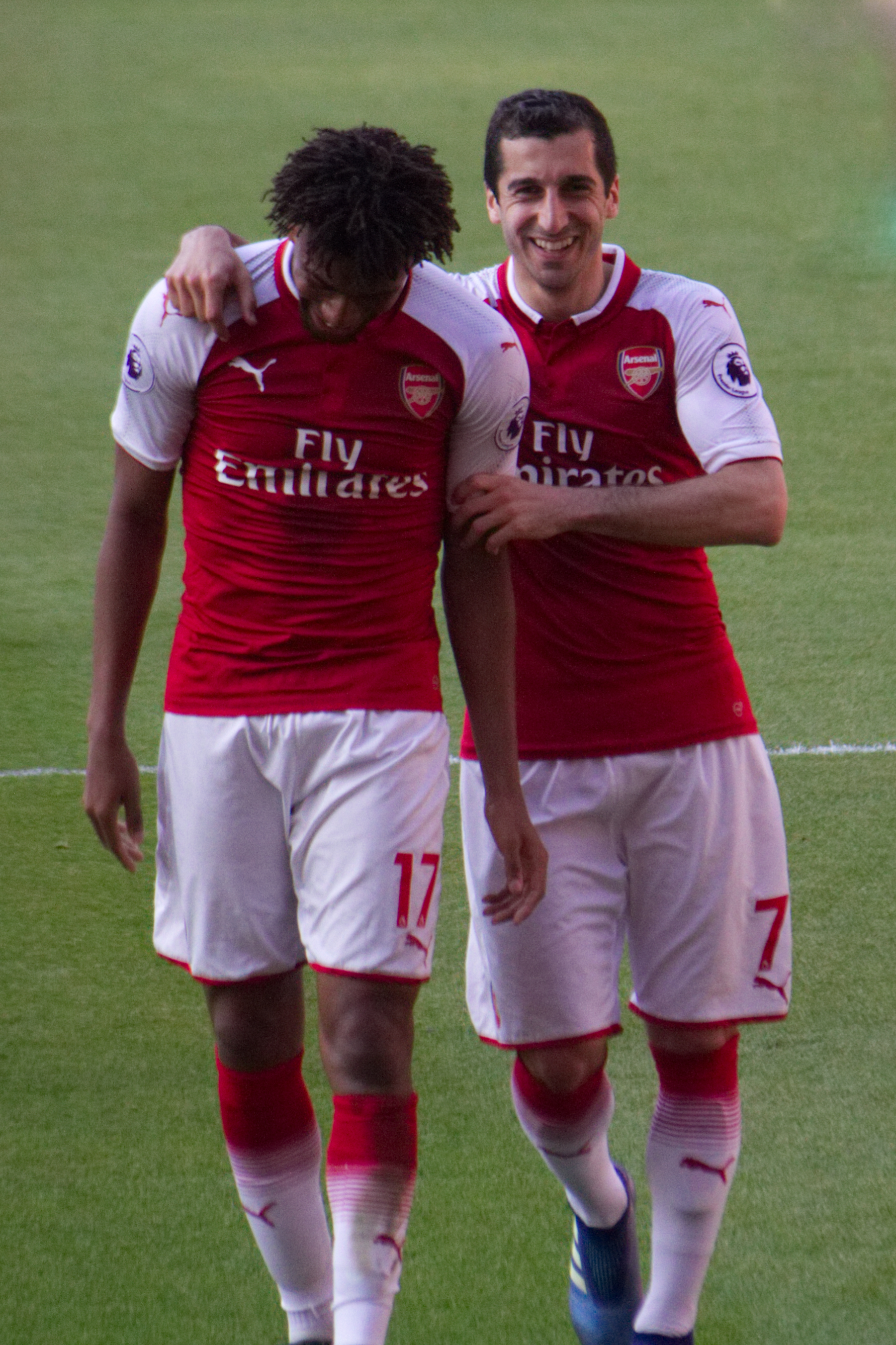
Mkhitaryan (right) with Alex Iwobi playing for Arsenal in 2018

On 22 January 2018, Arsenal announced the signing of Mkhitaryan from Manchester United, as part of a swap deal with Alexis Sánchez moving in the other direction. On 3 February 2018, he made his first start for Arsenal in a 5–1 home win over Everton, claiming three assists. Mkhitaryan returned from injury to face Manchester United at Old Trafford, scoring Arsenal's only goal in an eventual 2–1 loss, refusing to celebrate the goal out of respect for his former team.

Mkhitaryan scored a goal and an assist in Arsenal's second games of the 2018–19 season against London rivals Chelsea, losing the match 3–2. He scored a brace against Southampton in another 3–2 defeat, before suffering a metatarsal fracture in the following game, a 2–0 North London derby League Cup defeat. Mkhitaryan return to the squad to get two goals and three assists across his second and third game back, helping Arsenal in their 2–0 win over Southampton and 5–1 win over Bournemouth.

Mkhitaryan was at the centre of a controversy ahead of the 2019 UEFA Europa League final in Baku, Azerbaijan between Arsenal and Chelsea; Armenia and Azerbaijan do not have international relations and people of Armenian descent are forbidden entry to Azerbaijan without prior formal authorisation. Since he was not promised guarantees of security, he did not travel over safety fears. Mkhitaryan and Arsenal ultimately decided that he would not travel with the squad to the final match, as he previously opted twice not to travel to Azerbaijan, the first was in 2015 to play for Borussia Dortmund against Gabala, and the second was in 2018 for Arsenal against Qarabağ.

=== Roma ===
==== 2019–20 season: Initial loan ====
Mkhitaryan played three games for Arsenal before, on 2 September 2019, he joined Italian club A.S. Roma on a season-long loan deal for €3 million, plus an additional €100,000 in variables. Mkhitaryan made his debut against Sassuolo on 15 September and scored a goal in Roma's 4–2 win. In late September, Mkhitaryan suffered an injury to his adductor muscle in a 1–0 win over Lecce. Initially expected to be out for three weeks, he returned to the squad in late November. On his first game back from injury, Mkhitaryan scored in a 3–1 win over Hellas Verona. He then scored two games later against SPAL on 12 December 2019, sending Roma up to fourth place in the Serie A table.

In January 2020, Mkhitaryan suffered a second injury of the season to his thigh muscle putting him out for a further month. For the third time, he scored on his return to the squad, in a 3–2 loss to Bologna. He later scored in back to back victories over Lecce, and Cagliari.

==== 2020–2022: Permanent transfer and Conference League title ====
On 31 August 2020, Mkhitaryan's contract with Arsenal was cancelled by mutual consent and he joined Roma on a permanent deal. On 5 November 2020, Mkhitaryan scored the club's fastest-ever goal in the UEFA Europa League, after just 57 seconds, in a 5–0 defeat of Romanian outfit CFR Cluj. Three days later, he scored a hat-trick for Roma in a 3–1 Serie A win at Genoa.

His former coach José Mourinho was appointed as Roma manager ahead of the 2021–22 season, and the two were reunited despite their previously strained relationship at Manchester United. On 25 May 2022, Mkhitaryan was part of the starting eleven in the Conference League final against Feyenoord, which Roma won 1–0 with a goal from Nicolò Zaniolo.

=== Inter Milan ===
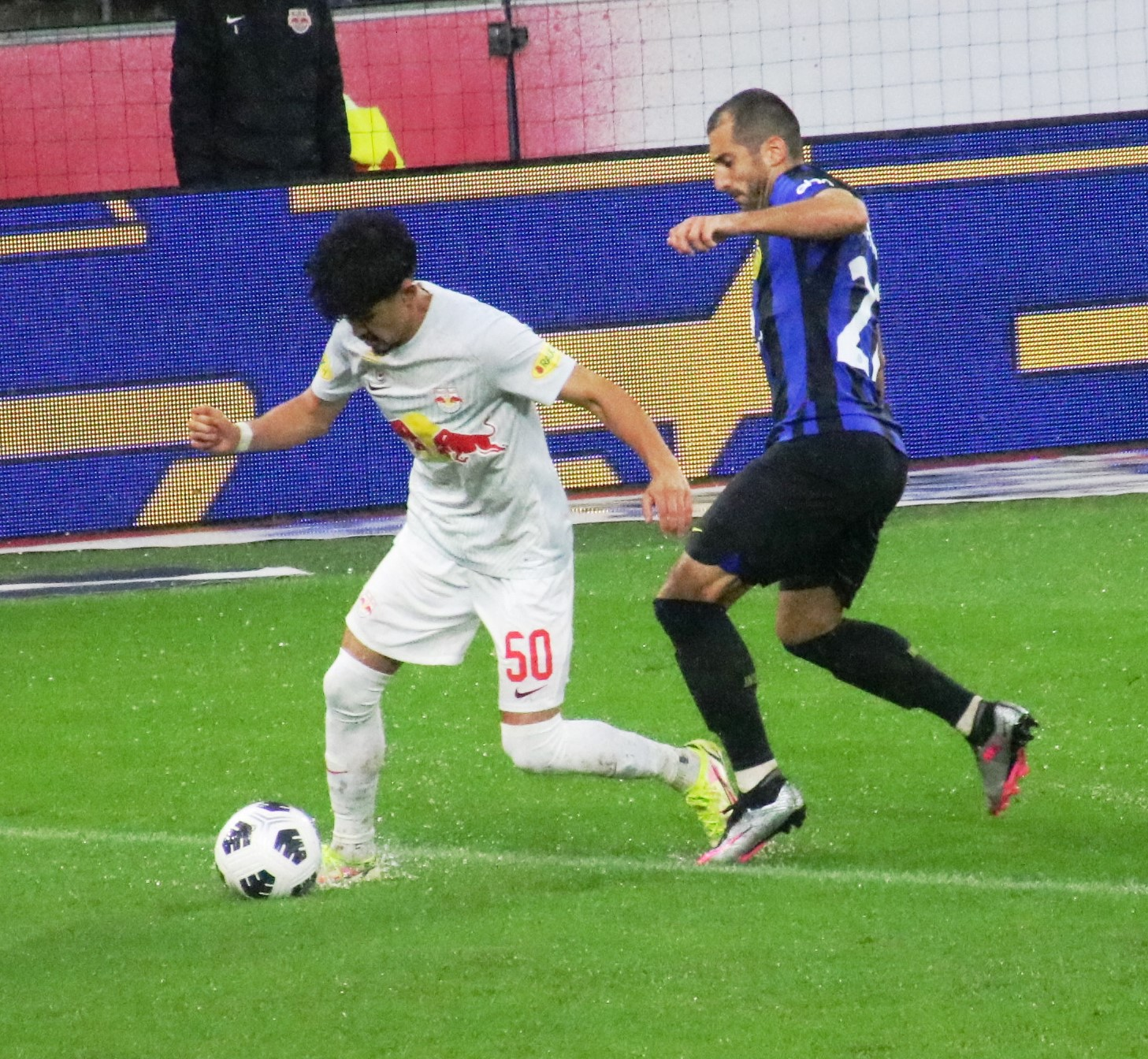
Mkhitaryan (right) playing for Inter in 2023

Mkhitaryan signed for Serie A club Inter Milan on 2 July 2022. On 26 October, he scored his first Champions League goal with Inter in a 4–0 win over Viktoria Plzeň, which secured his club's qualification to the knockout phase. On 10 May 2023, Mkhitaryan scored a goal in a 2–0 win over rivals Milan in the first leg of the Champions League semifinals. On 10 June 2023, he became the first Armenian to participate in the UEFA Champions League final, by making a substitute appearance against Manchester City.

Mkhitaryan scored a brace against AC Milan in a 5–1 derby win on 16 September 2023. On 30 December that year, he extended his contract with Inter Milan until 30 June 2026. In the 2023–24 season, he achieved his first Serie A title with the club. In the following season, he played a key role for Inter Milan during their Champions League campaign, and started in their second Champions League final in three seasons.

On 3 May 2026, he scored in a 2–0 win over Parma, helping his club secure the 2025–26 Serie A title.

== International career ==
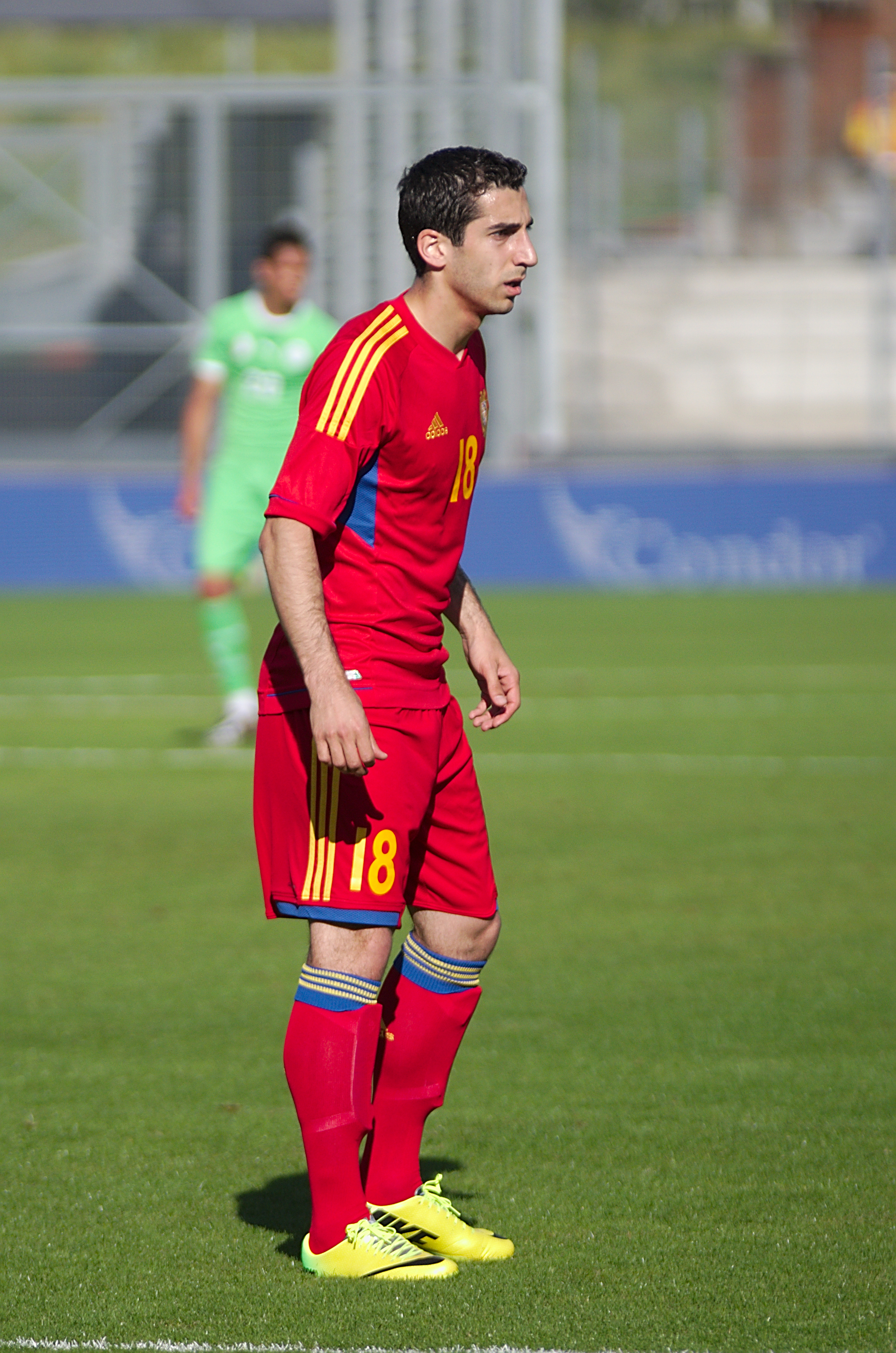
Mkhitaryan with Armenia in 2014

Mkhitaryan debuted for the Armenia national team in an away friendly match against Panama on 14 January 2007.

He scored six goals for Armenia in UEFA Euro 2012 qualifying Group B, thus becoming top goalscorer in that group. Although Armenia did not advance past the qualifying stage for UEFA Euro 2012, Mkhitaryan's performances landed him in the UEFA Euro 2012 Qualifying Dream Team with six goals.

On 10 September 2013, in the absence of regular skipper goalkeeper Roman Berezovsky, Mkhitaryan captained his country for the first time, as they lost 0–1 at home to Denmark in World Cup qualification. He became the top scorer in the history of the Armenia national team, after scoring his 12th goal for the national team in a 3–1 defeat to Italy in another qualifier on 15 October. This surpassed the 11 scored for the nation by Artur Petrosyan.

On 27 May 2014, he scored twice in a 4–3 friendly win against the United Arab Emirates at the Stade de la Fontenette in Carouge, Switzerland. Two years and a day later, he scored Armenia's first international hat-trick in a 7–1 friendly win over Guatemala in Los Angeles.

In March 2022, Mkhitaryan announced his international retirement.

== Style of play ==
Mkhitaryan is an attacking midfielder, who is also capable of playing as a second striker or as a winger. He excels playing in a central role, just behind the strikers, where he often looks to link up with his teammates in and around the penalty area. He is known for his ability to draw away opposing defenders and, in turn, create space for his teammates to exploit, leading to goal scoring opportunities, courtesy of his offensive movement, technique, and vision. Mkhitaryan has also been praised for his precise passing, dribbling ability, creativity, ball control and work rate, as well as his eye for the final pass; his skill and trickery on the ball enables him to beat defenders in one on one situations. Furthermore, he possesses an accurate shot.

Tom Jones, who was caretaker of Armenian national team when Mkhitaryan began playing in 2007, praised him in 2011 as "definitely good enough to play in the Premier League. He is very creative, gets his fair share of goals and is also extremely hard-working and has a great attitude." During the 2012–13 season, former Scottish footballer Pat Nevin said of Mkhitaryan, "Eleven goals in eight league matches already is fantastic, but when you add that he is a midfielder, it is phenomenal. You may not have heard of him yet, even if all the scouts at the top European clubs have, but you soon will. He has pace, skill, a rocket of a shot and the ability to arrive in the box like Frank Lampard. This all singles him out as a player who must be watched or more importantly marked."

== Personal life ==
Mkhitaryan is a polyglot, who speaks eight languages: Armenian, French, Portuguese, Russian, Ukrainian, English, Italian and German. He attributes his knowledge of Russian to his maternal grandmother, who was of Russian ethnicity. He learned the first three languages in his childhood, while the latter four he picked up playing in Ukraine, England, Italy, and Germany. Shakhtar's Donbass Arena has a tradition of playing music each time home players score goals, with a track corresponding to the nationality of a scorer. "Sabre Dance" by Armenian composer Aram Khachaturian was played whenever Mkhitaryan scored. This song became very popular in Donetsk due to Mkhitaryan scoring frequently. Mkhitaryan is a Christian and a member of the Armenian Apostolic Church.

=== Marriage ===
In June 2019, Mkhitaryan married Betty Vardanyan at the monastery of San Lazzaro degli Armeni, near Venice, Italy. She is the granddaughter of Hrant Vardanyan, the founder of Grand Holding, Armenia's main cigarettes and candy producer. Famous Italian tenor Al Bano made a surprise appearance to his marriage. On 4 March 2020, their son Hamlet was born. In 2023, their daughter Lilia was born in Milan.

=== Nicknames ===
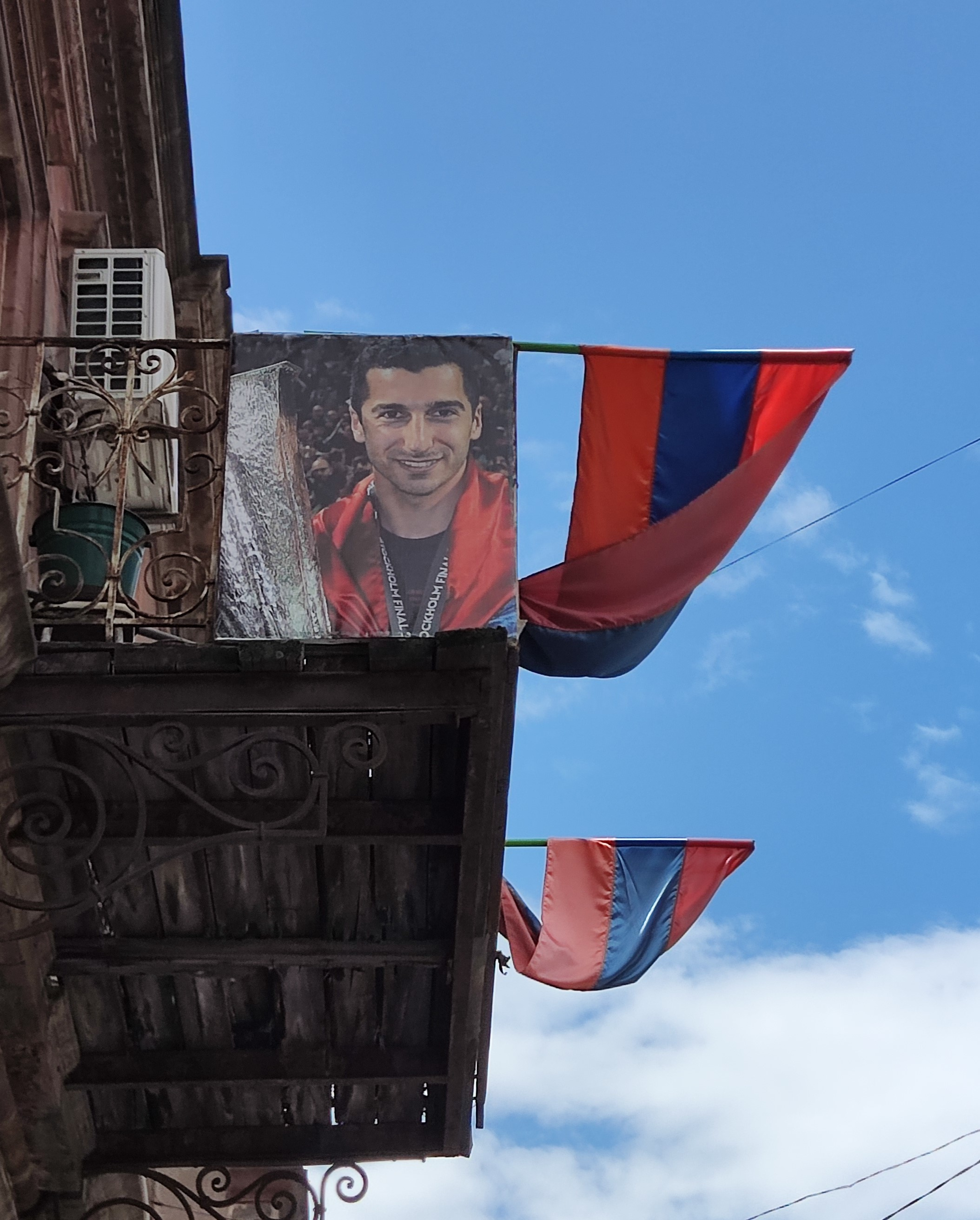
A poster of Mkhitaryan on a balcony in Yerevan, Armenia

Mkhitaryan has been nicknamed Heno (Հենո), short for Henrikh, by his fans in Armenia; he appreciates its informality.

Soon after joining Borussia Dortmund, he was often nicknamed Micki by international fans. Mkhitaryan did not approve of this and personally asked his fans to respect his Armenian family name, stating, "I have come to a foreign country and respect its laws and traditions, but I do want them to respect my love for homeland and my roots. I will not adapt and change anything. I'm going to score goals, then they will definitely remember my name." He stated in an interview that it was Borussia manager Jürgen Klopp who gave him that nickname because his surname is too long to pronounce, and he later responded that it is OK to use that nickname. His verified Instagram account is named micki_taryan.

=== State awards ===
In 2012, by the decision of the Yerevan City Council, and in connection with the city's 2,794th anniversary, Mkhitaryan was awarded with the "Honorary Citizen of Yerevan" title, for his great success in football and his brilliant achievements in sport .

Mkhitaryan has visited Artsakh three times on charity visits. In December 2011, Mkhitaryan visited Stepanakert, capital of the disputed territory, and donated gifts to the families of fallen soldiers. He was subsequently awarded the NKR Prime Minister's medal. In September 2020, amid the Nagorno-Karabakh war, Mkhitaryan called for international action to stop Azerbaijan from shelling civilian areas of Artsakh and urged international community to recognize Artsakh's independence.

== Career statistics ==
=== Club ===
As of match played 22 November 2026

Appearances and goals by club, season and competition
Club	Season	League			National cup (Note: Includes Armenian Cup, Ukrainian Cup, DFB-Pokal, FA Cup, Coppa Italia)		League cup (Note: Includes EFL Cup)		Europe		Other		Total	
Club	Season	Division	Apps	Goals	Apps	Goals	Apps	Goals	Apps	Goals	Apps	Goals	Apps	Goals
Pyunik	2006	Armenian Premier League	12	1	0	0	—		—		—		12	1
Pyunik	2007	Armenian Premier League	24	12	0	0	—		4 (Note: Appearances in UEFA Champions League)	0	—		28	12
Pyunik	2008	Armenian Premier League	24	6	5	3	—		2	0	—		31	9
Pyunik	2009	Armenian Premier League	10	11	6	2	—		—		—		16	13
Pyunik	Total		70	30	11	5	—		6	0	—		87	35
Metalurh Donetsk	2009–10	Ukrainian Premier League	29	9	2	1	—		6 (Note: Appearances in UEFA Europa League)	4	—		37	14
Metalurh Donetsk	2010–11	Ukrainian Premier League	8	3	0	0	—		—		—		8	3
Metalurh Donetsk	Total		37	12	2	1	—		6	4	—		45	17
Shakhtar Donetsk	2010–11	Ukrainian Premier League	17	3	3	1	—		7	0	—		27	4
Shakhtar Donetsk	2011–12	Ukrainian Premier League	26	10	4	1	—		6	0	1 (Note: Appearance in Ukrainian Super Cup)	0	37	11
Shakhtar Donetsk	2012–13	Ukrainian Premier League	29	25	4	2	—		8	2	1	0	42	29
Shakhtar Donetsk	Total		72	38	11	4	—		21	2	2	0	106	44
Borussia Dortmund	2013–14	Bundesliga	31	9	5	2	—		10	2	0	0	46	13
Borussia Dortmund	2014–15	Bundesliga	28	3	6	1	—		7	0	1 (Note: Appearance in DFL-Supercup)	1	42	5
Borussia Dortmund	2015–16	Bundesliga	31	11	6	5	—		15	7	—		52	23
Borussia Dortmund	Total		90	23	17	8	—		32	9	1	1	140	41
Manchester United	2016–17	Premier League	24	4	3	1	2	0	11	6	1 (Note: Appearance in FA Community Shield)	0	41	11
Manchester United	2017–18	Premier League	15	1	1	0	1	0	4	1	1 (Note: Appearance in UEFA Super Cup)	0	22	2
Manchester United	Total		39	5	4	1	3	0	15	7	2	0	63	13
Arsenal	2017–18	Premier League	11	2	—		—		6	1	—		17	3
Arsenal	2018–19	Premier League	25	6	0	0	3	0	11	0	—		38	6
Arsenal	2019–20	Premier League	3	0	—		—		—		—		3	0
Arsenal	Total		39	8	0	0	3	0	17	1	—		59	9
Roma (loan)	2019–20	Serie A	22	9	0	0	—		5	0	—		27	9
Roma	2020–21	Serie A	34	13	1	1	—		11	1	—		46	15
Roma	2021–22	Serie A	31	5	2	0	—		11 (Note: Appearances in UEFA Europa Conference League)	0	—		44	5
Roma	Roma total		87	27	3	1	—		27	1	—		117	29
Inter Milan	2022–23	Serie A	31	3	4	0	—		13	2	1 (Note: Appearance(s) in Supercoppa Italiana)	0	49	5
Inter Milan	2023–24	Serie A	36	2	1	0	—		7	0	2	0	46	2
Inter Milan	2024–25	Serie A	32	1	2	0	—		13	0	6 (Note: Two appearances in Supercoppa Italiana, four appearances in FIFA Club World Cup)	0	53	1
Inter Milan	2025–26	Serie A	30	4	4	0	—		4	0	1	0	39	4
Inter Milan	2026–27	Serie A	7	0	0	0	—		3	0	0	0	10	0
Inter Milan	Total		136	10	11	0	—		40	2	10	0	197	12
Career total			561	153	59	19	6	0	164	26	15	1	814	199

=== International ===
Appearances and goals by national team and year
National team	Year	Apps	Goals
Armenia	2007	2	0
Armenia	2008	5	0
Armenia	2009	7	1
Armenia	2010	5	3
Armenia	2011	8	4
Armenia	2012	8	2
Armenia	2013	8	2
Armenia	2014	7	4
Armenia	2015	6	0
Armenia	2016	5	3
Armenia	2017	9	6
Armenia	2018	10	1
Armenia	2019	6	3
Armenia	2020	2	1
Armenia	2021	7	2
Total		95	32

== Honours ==
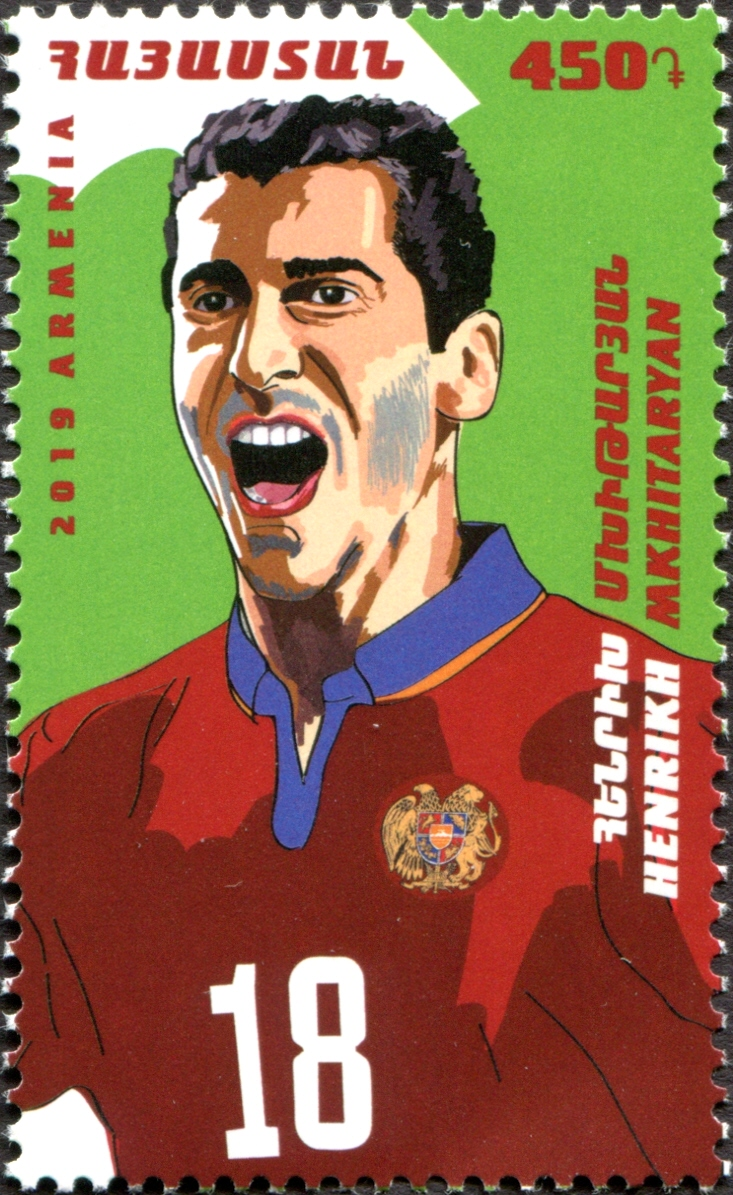
Mkhitaryan on a 2019 stamp of Armenia

Pyunik

- Armenian Premier League: 2006, 2007, 2008, 2009
- Armenian Cup: 2009
- Armenian Supercup: 2007, 2008

Shakhtar Donetsk

- Ukrainian Premier League: 2010–11, 2011–12, 2012–13
- Ukrainian Cup: 2010–11, 2011–12, 2012–13
- Ukrainian Super Cup: 2012

Borussia Dortmund

- DFL-Supercup: 2013, 2014

Manchester United

- EFL Cup: 2016–17
- FA Community Shield: 2016
- UEFA Europa League: 2016–17

Roma

- UEFA Europa Conference League: 2021–22

Inter Milan

- Serie A: 2023–24, 2025–26
- Coppa Italia: 2022–23, 2025–26
- Supercoppa Italiana: 2022, 2023
- UEFA Champions League runner-up: 2022–23, 2024–25

Individual

- Armenian Footballer of the Year: 2009, 2011, 2012, 2013, 2014, 2015, 2016, 2017, 2019, 2020, 2023, 2024
- Footballer of the Year in Baltic and Commonwealth of Independent States: 2012, 2013
- Ukrainian Premier League Best Player: 2012–13
- Ukrainian Premier League Top Scorer: 2012–13
- Ukrainian Premier League Footballer of the Year: 2012
- CIS Footballer of the Year: 2012, 2013
- Bundesliga Player of the Month: April 2016
- Bundesliga assist leader: 2015–16
- Bundesliga Team of the Season: 2015–16
- DFB-Pokal top goalscorer: 2015–16
- kicker Bundesliga Players' Player of the Season: 2015–16
- Premier League Goal of the Month: December 2016
- EFL Cup top assist provider: 2016–17
- Manchester United Goal of the Season: 2016–17 (vs Sunderland, 27 December 2016)
- UEFA Europa League Squad of the Season: 2016–17

Orders

- First-Class Medal of Services to the Motherland: 2017
