= 1995 Armenian Premier League =

Football league season

The 1995 Armenian Premier League season was a transitional season, therefore, there was no winner for the competition.

- Aragats FC from Gyumri were promoted.
- Homenmen-FIMA Yerevan were renamed Homenmen Yerevan.

== Group 1 ==
=== League table ===
Pos	Team	Pld	W	D	L	GF	GA	GD	Pts	Qualification
1	Shirak	10	7	3	0	23	6	+17	24	Group Champion
2	Tsement Ararat	10	5	1	4	19	12	+7	16	
3	Aznavour	10	4	1	5	10	14	−4	13	
4	Homenmen Yerevan	10	3	3	4	11	13	−2	12	
5	Zangezour	10	3	3	4	13	22	−9	12	
6	Yerazank	10	0	5	5	4	13	−9	5	

Source: RSSSF

=== Results ===
Home \ Away	AZN	HOM	SHI	TSE	YER	ZAN
Aznavour		1–0	0–1	3–2	2–0	1–2
Homenmen Yerevan	3–1		3–3	0–0	1–0	3–0
Shirak	2–0	4–0		2–0	1–1	6–1
Tsement Ararat	3–0	1–0	0–1		3–2	5–1
Yerazank	0–0	0–0	0–2	0–3		0–0
Zangezour	1–2	3–1	1–1	3–2	1–1	

Source: RSSSF
Legend: Blue = home team win; Yellow = draw; Red = away team win.

== Group 2 ==
=== League table ===
Pos	Team	Pld	W	D	L	GF	GA	GD	Pts	Qualification
1	Ararat Yerevan	10	6	2	2	34	11	+23	20	Group Champion
2	Homenetmen Yerevan	10	5	4	1	31	8	+23	19	
3	Kotayk	10	4	3	3	18	13	+5	15	
4	Van Yerevan	10	4	1	5	15	21	−6	13	
5	Aragats	10	2	3	5	14	31	−17	9	
6	Banants Kotayk	10	2	1	7	15	43	−28	7	

Source: RSSSF

=== Results ===
Home \ Away	ARG	ARA	BAN	HMT	KOT	VAN
Aragats		2–3	2–2	0–3	0–0	4–2
Ararat Yerevan	5–0		3–4	1–1	2–3	1–0
Banants Kotayk	4–5	0–8		1–5	2–1	0–2
Homenetmen Yerevan	10–0	1–1	7–1		0–0	1–1
Kotayk	0–0	0–4	4–1	2–1		6–0
Van Yerevan	2–1	0–6	6–0	0–1	2–1	

Source: RSSSF
Legend: Blue = home team win; Yellow = draw; Red = away team win.

== Top goalscorers ==
#	Player		Team	Goals
1	(Armenia)	Arsen Avetisyan	Homenetmen Yerevan	12
2	(Armenia)	Gegham Hovhannisyan	Homenetmen Yerevan	9
3	(Armenia)	Vahe Yaghmuryan	Kotayk	8
4	(Armenia)	Armen Shahgeldyan	Ararat Yerevan	7
4	(Armenia)	Levon Stepanyan	Ararat Yerevan	7
4	(Armenia)	Hovhannes Toumbaryan	Tsement Ararat	7

== See also ==
- 1995 in Armenian football
- 1995 Armenian First League
- 1995 Armenian Cup
