= Harutyun Abrahamyan =

Armenian footballer

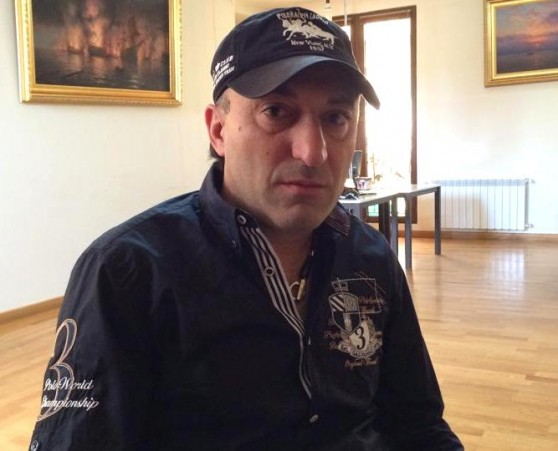

Personal information
- Full name: Harutyun Abrahamyan
- Date of birth: 4 December 1969 (age 56)
- Place of birth: Yerevan, Soviet Union
- Height: 1.82 m (5 ft 11 1/2 in)
- Position: Goalkeeper

Senior career*
Years	Team	Apps	(Gls)
1994–1996	FC Ararat Yerevan		
1996–1997	Keshavarz		
1998–1999	FC Yerevan		
2000–2001	FC MIKA		
2002–2003	FC Araks Ararat		
2004–2005	FC Kotayk Abovian		

International career
1992–2001	Armenia	26	(0)

Managerial career
- 2009–2011: Rah Ahan (Goalkeeping Coach)
- 2011: Persepolis (Goalkeeping Coach)
- 2012–2013: Mes Kerman (Goalkeeping Coach)
- 2013–2014: Zob Ahan (Goalkeeping Coach)
- * Club domestic league appearances and goals

Harutyun Abrahamyan (Armenian: Հարություն Աբրահամյան, born 4 December 1969 in Yerevan, Armenian SSR) is a retired football goalkeeper from Armenia. He obtained a total number of twenty six caps for the national team. Abrahamyan made his debut on 14 October 1992 in a friendly against Moldova (0–0). Apart from playing in his native country he spent one year in Iran with Keshavarz F.C. (1996–97).

== National team statistics ==
Armenia national team
Year	Apps	Goals
1992	1	0
1993	0	0
1994	2	0
1995	5	0
1996	5	0
1997	1	0
1998	1	0
1999	1	0
2000	5	0
2001	5	0
Total	26	0
