= Artur Petrosyan =

Armenian footballer (born 1971)

Personal information
- Date of birth: 17 December 1971 (age 54)
- Place of birth: Gyumri, Armenian SSR, Soviet Union
- Height: 1.79 m (5 ft 10 in)
- Position: Midfielder

Team information
- Current team: FC Thalwil (manager)

Senior career*
Years	Team	Apps	(Gls)
1989–1998	Shirak Gyumri	254	(112)
1998–1999	Maccabi Petah Tikva	14	(0)
1999	Lokomotiv Nizhniy Novgorod	6	(0)
1999–2000	Shirak Gyumri	42	(28)
2000–2003	Young Boys	70	(15)
2003–2006	FC Zürich	45	(15)
Total		431	(170)

International career
1992–2004	Armenia	69	(11)

Managerial career
- 2006–2016: FC Zürich (youth)
- 2014–2016: Armenia (assistant)
- 2016–2018: Armenia
- 2018–2019: Lori
- 2020–2022: FC Zürich (youth)
- 2022: Grasshoppers U18
- 2022–: FC Thalwil
- * Club domestic league appearances and goals

Artur Petrosyan (Armenian: Արթուր Պետրոսյան; born 17 December 1971) is an Armenian football coach and a former midfielder. He is the manager of Swiss club FC Thalwil.

== Playing career ==
Petrosyan was the all-time leading scorer for the Armenia national team, having scored 11 goals, and had participated in 69 international matches since his debut in the national team's first game in a home friendly match against Moldova on 14 October 1992. Henrikh Mkhitaryan overtook Petrosyan as Armenia's all-time scorer in 2013.

== Managerial career ==
Petrosyan worked as youth coach of FC Zürich, the last club he played for as a professional.

He also worked as the manager of Grasshoppers' under 18 squad.

In October 2016, Petrosyan become the manager of Armenia national team.

== Career statistics ==
Appearances and goals by national team and year
National team	Year	Apps	Goals
Armenia	1992	1	0
Armenia	1994	5	0
Armenia	1995	7	1
Armenia	1996	8	0
Armenia	1997	8	1
Armenia	1998	4	0
Armenia	1999	7	1
Armenia	2000	9	4
Armenia	2001	7	1
Armenia	2002	2	1
Armenia	2003	7	2
Armenia	2004	4	0
Total		69	11

Scores and results list Armenia's goal tally first, score column indicates score after each Petrosyan goal.

List of international goals scored by Artur Petrosyan
No.	Date	Venue	Opponent	Score	Result	Competition
1	15 November 1995	Denmark	Denmark		1–3	UEFA Euro 1996 qualifying
2	7 May 1997	Ukraine	Ukraine		1–1	1998 FIFA World Cup qualification
3	9 October 1999	Andorra	Andorra		3–0	UEFA Euro 2000 qualifying
4	4 February 2000	Cyprus	Cyprus		2–3	Friendly
5	3 June 2000	Lithuania	Lithuania		2–1	Friendly
6	7 October 2000	Armenia	Ukraine		2–3	2002 FIFA World Cup qualification
7	7 October 2000	Armenia	Ukraine		2–3	2002 FIFA World Cup qualification
8	6 June 2001	Armenia	Poland		1–1	2002 FIFA World Cup qualification
9	7 September 2002	Armenia	Ukraine		2–2	UEFA Euro 2004 qualifying
10	29 March 2003	Armenia	Northern Ireland		1–0	UEFA Euro 2004 qualifying
11	7 June 2003	Ukraine	Ukraine		3–4	UEFA Euro 2004 qualifying

== Managerial statistics ==
As of match played 27 March 2018

Team	From	To	Record				
Team	From	To	G	W	D	L	Win %
Armenia	2016	2018	11	5	2	4	45.45

== Honours ==
Shirak Gyumri

- Armenian Premier League (4): 1992, 1994, 1995, 1999
- Armenian Supercup (2): 1996, 1999

Maccabi Petach Tikva

- Toto Cup (1): 1999

FC Zürich

- Swiss Cup (1): 2005
- Swiss Super League (1): 2005–06
