= 2010 in Armenian football =

Football in Armenia
- Season: 2010

Men's football
- Premier League: Pyunik
- First League: Ararat Yerevan
- Cup: Pyunik
- Supercup: Pyunik

The following article presents a summary of the 2010 football (soccer) season in Armenia, which was the 19th season of competitive football in the country.

== National teams ==
=== Armenia ===
Date	Venue	Opponents	Score	Armenia scorer(s)	Report
Friendly matches
3 March 2010	Antalya Atatürk Stadium, Antalya (N)	Belarus	1–3	Pachajyan	FFA.am
25 May 2010	Republican Stadium, Yerevan (H)	Uzbekistan	3–1	Mkhitaryan, Manucharyan (2)	FFA.am
11 August 2010	Hrazdan Stadium, Yerevan (H)	Iran	1–3	Mkrtchyan	FFA.am
UEFA Euro 2012 qualifying
3 September 2010	Republican Stadium, Yerevan (H)	Republic of Ireland	0–1		UEFA.com
7 September 2010	Philip II Arena, Skopje (A)	Macedonia	2–2	Movsisyan, Manucharyan	UEFA.com
8 October 2010	Republican Stadium, Yerevan (H)	Slovakia	3–1	Movsisyan, Ghazaryan, Mkhitaryan	UEFA.com
12 October 2010	Republican Stadium, Yerevan (H)	Andorra	4–0	Ghazaryan, Mkhitaryan, Movsisyan, Pizzelli	UEFA.com

=== Armenia U21 ===
Date	Venue	Opponents	Score	Armenia scorer(s)	Report
2011 UEFA European Under-21 Football Championship qualification - Group stage
3 March 2010	Tallaght Stadium, Dublin (A)	Republic of Ireland	2–1	Hayrapetyan, Ghazaryan	UEFA.com
20 May 2010	Kadrioru Stadium, Tallinn (A)	Estonia	3–2	Ghazaryan (2), Manoyan	UEFA.com
11 August 2010	Republican Stadium, Yerevan (H)	Georgia	2–3	Mkhitaryan, Poghosyan	UEFA.com
11 November 2011	Mikheil Meskhi Stadium, Tbilisi (A)	Georgia	2–0	Dashyan, Poghosyan	UEFA.com

=== Armenia U19 ===
Date	Venue	Opponents	Score	Armenia scorer(s)	Report
2011 UEFA European Under-19 Football Championship qualifying round
19 October 2010	Sūduva Stadium, Marijampolė (A)	Israel	0–3		UEFA.com
21 October 2010	Sūduva Stadium, Marijampolė (A)	Spain	0–3		UEFA.com
23 October 2010	Marijampolė Stadium, Marijampolė (A)	Lithuania	1–0	H. Hovhannisyan	UEFA.com

=== Armenia U17 ===
Date	Venue	Opponents	Score	Armenia scorer(s)	Report
2011 UEFA European Under-17 Football Championship qualifying round
22 September 2010	KR-völlur, Reykjavík (A)	Turkey	0–3		UEFA.com
24 September 2010	Akranesvöllur, Akranes (A)	Czech Republic	1–1	Papikyan	UEFA.com
27 September 2010	Keflavíkurvöllur, Keflavik (A)	Iceland	1–2	Minasyan	UEFA.com

== League tables ==
=== Premier League ===
Pos	Team	Pld	W	D	L	GF	GA	GD	Pts	Qualification
1	Pyunik (C)	28	20	5	3	73	22	+51	65	Qualification for the Champions League second qualifying round
2	Banants	28	20	4	4	58	24	+34	64	Qualification for the Europa League first qualifying round
3	Ulisses	28	17	4	7	44	23	+21	55	Qualification for the Europa League first qualifying round
4	Mika	28	14	4	10	47	31	+16	46	Qualification for the Europa League second qualifying round (Note: Winners of 2011 Armenian Cup.)
5	Impulse	28	10	7	11	29	43	−14	37	
6	Gandzasar Kapan	28	8	3	17	24	45	−21	27	
7	Kilikia	28	4	3	21	19	60	−41	15	Team disbanded after the season (Note: Kilikia decided not to participate in 2011 Armenian Premier League competition, citing financial difficulties as a reason.)
8	Shirak (Note: Executive committee of the Football Federation of Armenia decided to allow Shirak to participate in the Premier League next season despite the fact that FC Shirak took the last place in the tournament and was supposed to leave it.)	28	2	4	22	22	68	−46	10	

Rules for classification: 1) points; 2) goal difference; 3) number of goals scored.
(C) Champions

=== First League ===
Pos	Team	Pld	W	D	L	GF	GA	GD	Pts	Promotion
1	Ararat Yerevan	24	17	4	3	50	19	+31	55	Promotion to Armenian Premier League
2	Banants-2	24	16	2	6	59	35	+24	50	
3	Pyunik-2	24	16	2	6	52	20	+32	50	
4	Gandzasar-2	24	13	5	6	37	20	+17	44	
5	Shengavit	24	8	7	9	42	41	+1	31	
6	Mika-2	24	7	5	12	28	44	−16	26	
7	Impuls-2	24	5	4	15	22	41	−19	19	
8	Pyunik-3	24	5	3	16	22	53	−31	18	
9	Shirak-2	24	4	2	18	18	57	−39	14	

== Armenian clubs in Europe ==
=== Summary ===
Club	Competition	Final round
Pyunik	UEFA Champions League	Second qualifying round
Mika	UEFA Europa League	Second qualifying round
Banants	UEFA Europa League	First qualifying round
Ulisses	UEFA Europa League	First qualifying round

=== Pyunik ===
Date	Venue	Opponents	Score	Pyunik scorer(s)	Report
2010–11 Champions League - Second qualifying round
14 July 2010	Stadion FK Partizan, Belgrade (A)	(Serbia) Partizan	1–3	Yedigaryan	UEFA.com
21 July 2010	Republican Stadium, Yerevan (H)	(Serbia) Partizan	0–1		UEFA.com

=== Mika ===
Date	Venue	Opponents	Score	Mika scorer(s)	Report
2010–11 Europa League - Second qualifying round
15 July 2010	Philip II Arena, Skopje (A)	(North Macedonia) Rabotnički	0–1		UEFA.com
22 July 2010	Mika Stadium, Yerevan (H)	(North Macedonia) Rabotnički	0–0		UEFA.com

=== Banants ===
Date	Venue	Opponents	Score	Banants scorer(s)	Report
2010–11 Europa League - First qualifying round
1 July 2010	Antonis Papadopoulos Stadium, Larnaca (A)	(Cyprus) Anorthosis	0–3		UEFA.com
8 July 2010	Republican Stadium, Yerevan (H)	(Cyprus) Anorthosis	0–1		UEFA.com

=== Ulisses ===
Date	Venue	Opponents	Score	Ulisses scorer(s)	Report
2010–11 Europa League - First qualifying round
1 July 2010	Hrazdan Stadium, Yerevan (H)	(Israel) Bnei Yehuda	0–0		UEFA.com
8 July 2010	Bloomfield Stadium, Tel Aviv (A)	(Israel) Bnei Yehuda	0–1		UEFA.com
