= Sargis Hovsepyan =

Armenian footballer

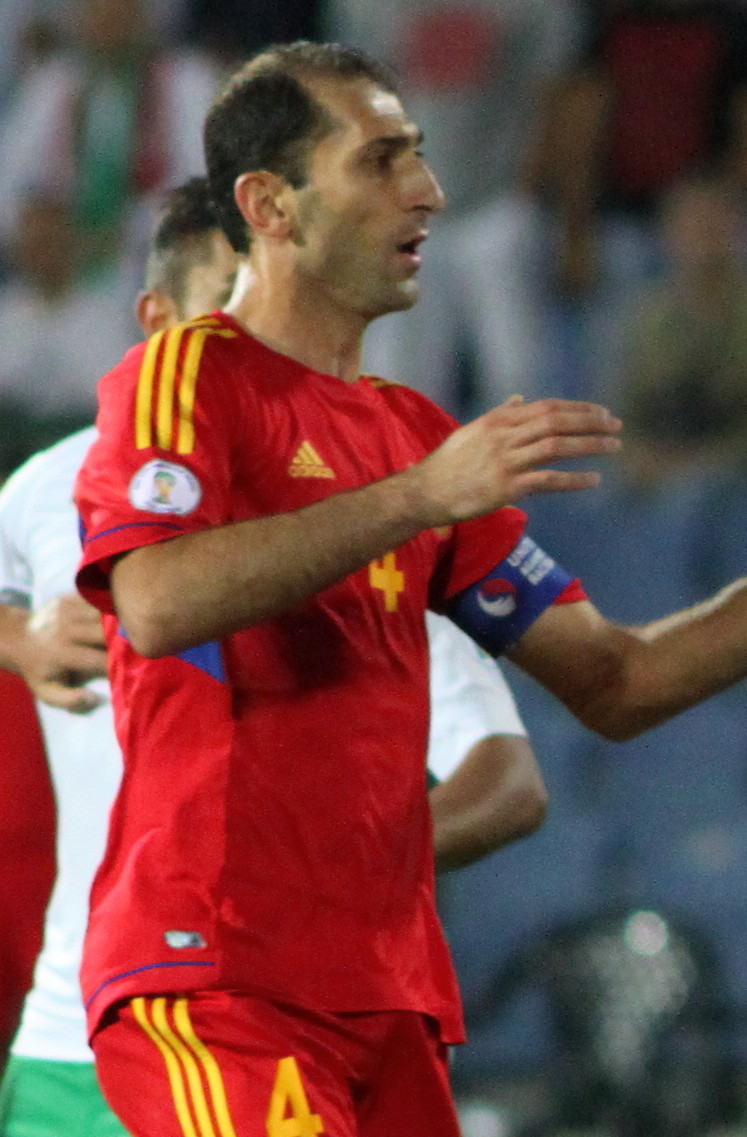
- Hovsepyan with Armenia in 2012

Personal information
- Full name: Sargis Rubenovich Hovsepyan
- Date of birth: 2 November 1972 (age 54)
- Place of birth: Yerevan, Armenian SSR, Soviet Union
- Height: 1.82 m (6 ft 0 in)
- Position: Right-back

Senior career*
Years	Team	Apps	(Gls)
1990–1991	Malatia Yerevan	25	(0)
1991–1992	Lori Vanadzor	33	(0)
1992–1997	Pyunik Yerevan	153	(6)
1998–2003	Zenit St. Petersburg	153	(2)
2003–2004	Torpedo-Metallurg	14	(0)
2004–2012	Pyunik Yerevan	190	(14)
Total		568	(22)

International career
1992–2012	Armenia	132	(2)

Managerial career
- 2013–2014: Armenia U19
- 2013–2016: FC Pyunik
- 2014–2015: Armenia U21
- 2015: Armenia (interim)
- 2015–2016: Armenia U21
- * Club domestic league appearances and goals

Sargis Hovsepyan (Armenian: Սարգիս Հովսեփյան; born on 2 November 1972) is an Armenian professional football coach and a former player who played as a right-back. Hovsepyan was the long-time captain of the Armenia national team.

Hovsepyan participated in 132 international matches and scored two goals since his debut in the national team's first game in a home friendly match against Moldova on 14 October 1992. Hovsepyan ended his career on 14 November 2012 at the age of 39, just over a month before turning 40 years old. He was the last member of the first Armenia national team to retire. After his final match, he was awarded the Medal of the City Hall.

A month after the completion of his playing career, he was appointed director of the Armenia national team.

== Club career ==
Sargis Hovsepyan played his first match at the professional level when he was seventeen. It was in the Soviet Top League with second league club Malatia Yerevan. The following year, the Soviet Union collapsed. Sargis had then started competing in the Armenian Premier League of his now independent homeland. Hovsepyan first joined Lori Vanadzor in 1991 and was transferred to Pyunik Yerevan the following year. He immediately became the first star of the country. In 1992, he became the first player to be named Armenian Footballer of the Year. In the same year he made his debut for the national team. Hovsepyan was named Armenian Footballer of the Year again for 1995, becoming the first player to receive the award twice.

Hovsepyan was switched clubs in 1997 to 1998 and spent the next part of his club career in Russia. Anatoliy Byshovets had acquired Hovsepyan and took him into Zenit St. Petersburg. Zenit coach Anatoli Davydov later believed Hovsepyan to be suited for right-back. In this position, Sargis was so good that by the end of the season in 1999, the leaders of the club called him the best player on the team. The first season Hovsepyan joined them, Zenit won the 1998–99 Russian Cup, the Russian Cup in history. The categorically refused to sell any kind. Hovsepyan began to receive the interest of CSKA Moscow and Lokomotiv Moscow.

However, Yury Morozov, the next coach of St. Petersburg, had decided not to use Hovsepyan for any useful positions. And thus he unwittingly provoked the subsequent parting player with the club. No player in the new center of defense look convincing. Suffice it to say that in the list of 33 best for the season of 2002, Hovsepyan was in second place - just after Sergei Ignashevich. But in just a couple of months, it turned out that without Hovsepyan in Zenit, the defense was superfluous. In the football club, tactical revolution broke out. The team became the defensive line, and the specialty of the last defender suddenly lost its relevance.

Vlastimil Petržela, who brought St. Petersburg advanced developments, claimed the Armenian defender couldn't do their plays. Sargis was unable to fit into the new tactical realities. "Hovsepyan did blunders, played frankly bad. But the 'zone' is not understood - man all his life playing personal, and in thirty years to relearn hard" said Vyacheslav Malafeev. This does not provide an understanding of why the coach did not use the defense in a different role, on the flank. Petrzhela then explained that Hovsepyan lacked speed. Adoption of a strange, given that it is this quality that has always been one of the main advantages of the player. Apparently, the defender simply agreed whatever the coach felt, and in the summer of 2003, Hovsepyan left Zenit and was forced on the transfer list. A couple of years later, Petrzhela, watching from St. Petersburg, had another defender, Daniel Kiritse, who wished him not to get lost in football, as Hovsepyan. From the present day, farewell funny. Because the "lost" Sargis ten years has been claimed in the big football, and the pan coach after the Zenit has had it once quickly. Play the game in 2003 at the club Torpedo-Metallurg, Hovsepyan returned to Pyunik and left from Russia. He won a lot of national trophies in 2008 and won the Armenian Footballer of the Year award for a third time in 2008. He is the first player to win the award three times, a feat that has only been matched by Henrikh Mkhitaryan.

In the match of the 1st round of the 2010 Armenian Premier League, Sargis Hovsepyan had his 500th match in meetings, becoming the second player of Armenia who overcame the barrier of 500 matches. This match could mark Hovsepyan scoring a goal, but could not due to a penalty.

On 10 May 2010, winning in Pyunik the final match of the Armenian Cup against Banants, he became the oldest player in the history of the Armenian football to win the Cup. On that day, Hovsepyan was 37 years and 189 days. This figure surpassed the previous one, which was owned by Karen Simonyan, who won the Cup in 36 years and 336 days (2007). Hovsepyan also owns another cup record. In total he had in this tournament 62 games.

Hovsepyan has been on the winning team of the Armenian Premier League for nine seasons, the most of any player in the history of the League.

Sargis Hovsepyan retired as a football player in 2012. On this occasion, the former captain of Pyunik and the national team made a special appeal to the entire football community, in which he stated that, in his opinion, it is time to hang up his boots.

== International career ==
The first match for Hovsepyan and the Armenia national team was held on 14 October 1992 in a home game qualifier against Moldova, which ended 0–0.

In December, the UEFA Executive Committee, while in Prague, took a decision that players who have played a part of their national team for 100 matches will receive their awards from UEFA. These awards will also be awarded retroactively. Thus Hovsepyan, who played more than 100 matches in the national team of Armenia, in absentia, won this award.

Playing for the Armenian team from 1992 to 2012, Hovsepyan had 131 matches and scored 2 goals and became the champion on to play a match for the national team. In the near forty years of his life, he spent twenty playing for the national team.

"I don't think I'm a legend; I simply did my job."

— Sargis Hovsepyan

Hovsepyan played his final game on 14 November 2012 in a friendly match against Lithuania, which Armenia won 4–2, and then retired from association football afterward. That same night, Hovsepyan received a standing ovation from the Yerevan Republican Stadium audience. Hovsepyan was awarded a gold Medal of City Hall by Yerevan Mayor Taron Margaryan and awarded a car by Armenian Football Federation head Ruben Hayrapetyan for his contributions to Armenian football. He was the last member of the original Armenia national team to retire.

== Coaching career ==
A couple months after retiring as a football player, Hovsepyan joined the coaching staff of FC Pyunik and became the assistant coach to the club's head coach and national team manager Vardan Minasyan.

== Personal life ==
Hovsepyan has a son, who is training with Pyunik and plays for their junior club. It is Hovsepyan's dream for his son to play on the same football field as him.

== Career statistics ==
=== International ===
As of match played 14 November 2012

Armenia
Year	Apps	Goals
1992	1	0
1994	4	0
1995	7	0
1996	9	0
1997	9	0
1998	4	0
1999	7	0
2000	7	0
2001	6	0
2002	2	0
2003	5	0
2004	9	0
2005	7	0
2006	6	0
2007	12	1
2008	7	0
2009	8	1
2010	7	0
2011	8	0
2012	7	0
Total	132	2

Scores and results list Armenia's goal tally first, score column indicates score after each Hovsepyan goal.

List of international goals scored by Sargis Hovsepyan
No.	Date	Venue	Opponent	Score	Result	Competition
1	2 June 2007	Almaty Central Stadium, Almaty, Kazakhstan	Kazakhstan	2–0	2–1	UEFA Euro 2008 qualifying
2	9 September 2009	Hanrapetakan Stadium, Yerevan, Armenia	Belgium	2–0	2–1	2010 World Cup qualifying

== Honours ==
=== As a player ===
Pyunik Yerevan

- Armenian Premier League (9): 1992, 1995–96, 2004, 2005, 2006, 2007, 2008, 2009, 2010
- Armenian Cup: 1996, 2004, 2009, 2010
- Armenian Supercup (5): 1997, 2004, 2006, 2007, 2009

Zenit St. Petersburg

- Russian Cup: 1998–99; runner-up: 2001–02
- Russian Premier League Cup: 2003

Individual

- Armenian Footballer of the Year: 1992, 1995, 2008

=== As a manager ===
Pyunik Yerevan

- Armenian Premier League: 2014–15
- Armenian Cup: 2013–14, 2014–15

== See also ==
- List of men's footballers with 100 or more international caps
