= Karlen Mkrtchyan =

Armenian footballer

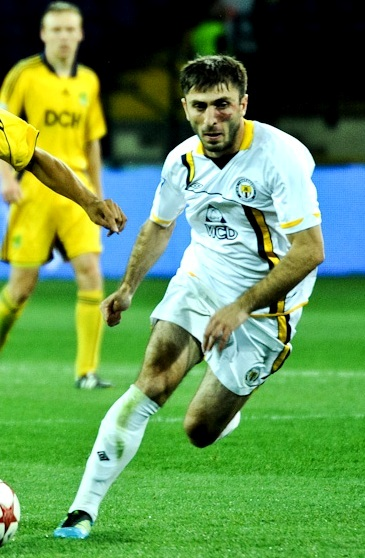

Personal information
- Full name: Karlen Vardkesovich Mkrtchyan
- Date of birth: 25 November 1988 (age 37)
- Place of birth: Yerevan, Armenian SSR, Soviet Union
- Height: 1.75 m (5 ft 9 in)
- Position: Midfielder

Senior career*
Years	Team	Apps	(Gls)
2006–2011	Pyunik	83	(10)
2011–2015	Metalurh Donetsk	47	(0)
2013–2014	→ Anzhi Makhachkala (loan)	13	(0)
2014–2015	Tobol Kostanay	4	(0)
2015–2016	Anzhi Makhachkala	22	(1)
2017–2020	Pyunik	44	(3)
Total		213	(14)

International career
2007–2010	Armenia U21	13	(1)
2008–2019	Armenia	56	(2)
- * Club domestic league appearances and goals

Karlen Mkrtchyan (Armenian: Կառլեն Մկրտչյան; born 25 November 1988) is an Armenian former professional footballer who played as a midfielder.

== Club career ==
=== Pyunik ===
Karlen Mkrtchyan is a graduate the Armenian football club school Pyunik Yerevan. Since 2007, he played for the first team. In the 2008 Armenian Premier League he played in all 28 games, and also took part in the final match against Ararat Yerevan, in which Pyunik won the Premier League. With Mkrtchyan as a member, Pyunik won the Armenian Premier League in 2007, 2008, 2009, 2010, the Armenian Cup in 2009 and 2010 and the Armenian Supercup in 2007, 2008 and 2010.

On 10 January 2011, it was reported that Karlen went to preseason camp in Turkey with Kuban Krasnodar. Together with Mkrtchyan on interest of Kuban was national teammate Gevorg Ghazaryan. In the test match against Astana Locomotive, Mkrtchyan was seriously hurt damaged, resulting in a surgery.

=== Metalurh Donetsk ===
On 1 April 2011, Mkrtchyan signed a contract with Metalurh Donetsk for three years. Following a vote held at the official site of Donetsk Metalurh, Mkrtchyan was voted the best player of the club in October, November and December 2011.

=== Anzhi Makhachkala ===
On 30 August 2013, Mkrtchyan signed for Russian Premier League side Anzhi Makhachkala.

=== Tobol ===
On 9 January 2015, Mkrtchyan signed a one-year contract with Kazakhstan Premier League side FC Tobol, leaving the club on 22 April of the same year through mutual consent. Following his release from Tobol, Mkrtchyan trained with FC Pyunik.

=== Anzhi Makhachkala ===
On 26 June 2015, Mkrtchyan signed a three-year contract to return to Anzhi Makhachkala.

On 31 January 2017, Anzhi removed him from their Russian Premier League roster.

=== Pyunik ===
On 17 August 2017, Mkrtchyan signed a one-year contract with his former club Pyunik of the Armenian Premier League. On 2 July 2020, Pyunik announced that Mkrtchyan had left the club after his contract had expired.

After two years without a club, he decided to end his career due to recurring injuries.

== International career ==
Since joining Pyunik he began to be involved in 2008 in the Armenia U-21 team that in a home game, he scored his first goal for the youth national team and the first goal of the match against the Turkey U-21 team. Armenia defeated Turkey 2–1. Since 2008, plays for the senior Armenia national football team. The first match held on 2 February 2008 in Malta's capital Valletta, against the local national team. The match ended 1–0 in favor of the Armenian team. Mkrtchyan scored his first goal for the Armenia national team on 14 November 2012 in a home friendly match against Lithuania at the 50th minute. Armenia defeated Lithuania 4–2.

== Personal life ==
Following the 14 November 2012 Armenian national game, in which Mkrtchyan scored his first goal for the team, he headed back to Donetsk together with his wife and got married. His wife was a classmate of fellow Metalurh and Armenian national player Gevorg Ghazaryan.

== Career statistics ==
=== Club ===
As of match played 29 February 2020

Appearances and goals by club, season and competition
Club	Season	League			National Cup		League Cup		Continental		Other		Total	
Club	Season	Division	Apps	Goals	Apps	Goals	Apps	Goals	Apps	Goals	Apps	Goals	Apps	Goals
Metalurh Donetsk	2010–11	Ukrainian Premier League	6	0	0	0	–		–		–		6	0
Metalurh Donetsk	2011–12	Ukrainian Premier League	19	0	4	0	–		–		0	0	23	0
Metalurh Donetsk	2012–13	Ukrainian Premier League	16	0	1	0	–		–		–		17	0
Metalurh Donetsk	2013–14	Ukrainian Premier League	6	0	0	0	–		2	0	–		8	0
Metalurh Donetsk	2014–15	Ukrainian Premier League	0	0	0	0	–		–		–		0	0
Metalurh Donetsk	Total		47	0	5	0	0	0	2	0	0	0	54	0
Anzhi Makhachkala (loan)	2013–14	Russian Premier League	13	0	0	0	–		5	1	–		18	1
Tobol	2014	Kazakhstan Premier League	4	0	0	0	–		–		–		4	0
Anzhi Makhachkala	2015–16	Russian Premier League	20	1	1	0	–		–		0	0	21	1
Anzhi Makhachkala	2016–17	Russian Premier League	2	0	0	0	–		–		–		2	0
Anzhi Makhachkala	Total		22	1	1	0	0	0	0	0	0	0	23	1
Pyunik	2017–18	Armenian Premier League	16	1	1	0	–		0	0	–		17	1
Pyunik	2018–19	Armenian Premier League	22	1	2	0	–		1	0	–		25	1
Pyunik	2019–20	Armenian Premier League	6	1	0	0	–		5	0	–		11	1
Pyunik	Total		44	3	3	0	0	0	6	0	0	0	53	3
Career total			130	4	9	0	0	0	13	1	0	0	152	5

=== International ===
Scores and results list Armenia's goal tally first, score column indicates score after each Mkrtchyan goal.

List of international goals scored by Karlen Mkrtchyan
No.	Date	Venue	Opponent	Score	Result	Competition
1	14 November 2012	Republican Stadium, Yerevan, Armenia	Lithuania	2–0	4–2	Friendly
2	6 September 2013	Eden Arena, Prague, Czech Republic	Czech Republic	1–0	2–1	2014 World Cup Qualifier

== Honours ==
Pyunik Yerevan

- Armenian Premier League: 2007, 2008, 2009, 2010
- Armenian Cup: 2009, 2010
- Armenian Supercup: 2007, 2008, 2010

Individual

- Armenian Footballer of the Year: 2010
- Metalurh Donetsk Player of the Month: October 2011, November 2011, December 2011
- Metalurh Donetsk Player of First Half of Season: 2012–13
- Metalurh Donetsk Best Foreign Player: 2012
