= Grigor Meliksetyan =

Armenian footballer

Personal information
- Full name: Grigor Meliksetyan
- Date of birth: 18 August 1986 (age 40)
- Place of birth: Yerevan, Armenia
- Height: 1.92 m (6 ft 4 in)
- Position: Goalkeeper

Senior career*
Years	Team	Apps	(Gls)
2007–2009	Pyunik Yerevan	52	(0)
2009–2010	Impuls FC	7	(0)
2010–2011	Mes Sarcheshmeh	10	(0)
2011–2012	Paykan Tehran	13	(0)
2012–2013	Gahar Zagros	3	(0)
2013–2014	Ararat Yerevan	10	(0)
2014	Gandzasar Kapan	19	(0)
2015	Ulisses	15	(0)
2015–2016	Gandzasar Kapan	22	(0)
2017	Pars Jonoubi Jam	0	(0)
2017–2020	Gandzasar Kapan	58	(0)
2021	Ararat	0	(0)
2021–2022	Pyunik Yerevan	1	(0)

International career
2007–2008	Armenia U-21	7	(0)
2012–	Armenia	4	(0)
- * Club domestic league appearances and goals as of 8 June 2022

Grigor Meliksetyan (Armenian: Գրիգոր Մելիքսեթյան, born on 18 August 1986 in Yerevan) is an Armenian football player, who plays as a goalkeeper.

== Club career ==
Grigor Meliksetyan is a graduate football school Pyunik Yerevan. Pyunik won the 2007 Armenian Premier League with Meliksetyan as the second goalkeeper. Already in 2008, he was the first goalkeeper of the Yerevan club. Pyunik became 2008 Armenian Premier League champion again the next year. After the 2008 season, Meliksetyan was awarded the "Most Reliable Goalkeeper" title by the Football Federation of Armenia. Throughout the 2009 Armenian Premier League championship, he performed consistently well. Head coach of Pyunik Vardan Minasyan rarely replaced him with second goalkeeper Edward Hovhannisyan. However, at the end of the season, after Pyunik won the League with Meliksetyan for a third time, Hovhannisyan began showing more adult game and more reliably at keeping the goal. Meliksetyan eventually had to give the first position on the club to his colleague and rival.

Meliksetyan began looking for a new club in early 2010. Meliksetyan tried Iranian club S.C. Damash, which intended to make a contract with the player. But because of differences in the conditions, the transition does not take place. However, in order not to lose the physical form, Meliksetian conducted training sessions in Impuls Dilijan. Close ties at the time of training took effect on the future place of residence of the football player and, in February, he signed a contract with the Impuls, which at the beginning of the year had already acquired two highly rated goalkeepers, Felix Hakobyan and Mais Azizyan. Meliksetyan's first official match in Impuls happened on 23 March 2010 in the Armenian Cup against Pyunik, in which the team lost with a score of 0:1. Because of the high competition in Impuls, he had to find a new club.

During the summer transfer window, he moved to Gandzasar Kapan, but did not ever play or sign a contract. He then went to Iran, where he signed a contract with the club Mes Sarcheshmeh. The following season, he played in another Iranian team, Paykan Tehran. Today, he is the main goalkeeper of Gahar Zagros.

On 1 June 2022, Meliksetyan left Pyunik after his contract expired.

== International career ==
Meliksetyan played in the Armenia U-21 youth team for 7 games.

In January 2012, he was invited to the Armenia national football team to participate in a February friendship match in Cyprus. On 28 February, he debuted for the national team of Armenia in a match against Serbia. The game ended with in defeat for the Armenian team 0:2. Both goals were scored when Meliksetyan was guarding the goal. The first ball flew over him, the second he stopped but couldn't pick up in time.

== Honours ==
=== Club ===
Pyunik Yerevan

- Armenian Premier League (4): 2007, 2008, 2009, 2021–22
- Armenian Cup (1): 2009
- Armenian Supercup (2): 2007, 2008
- Armenian Supercup Runner-up (1): 2009

=== Individual ===
- Most Reliable Goalkeeper: 2008
