= Edgar Malakyan =

Armenian footballer

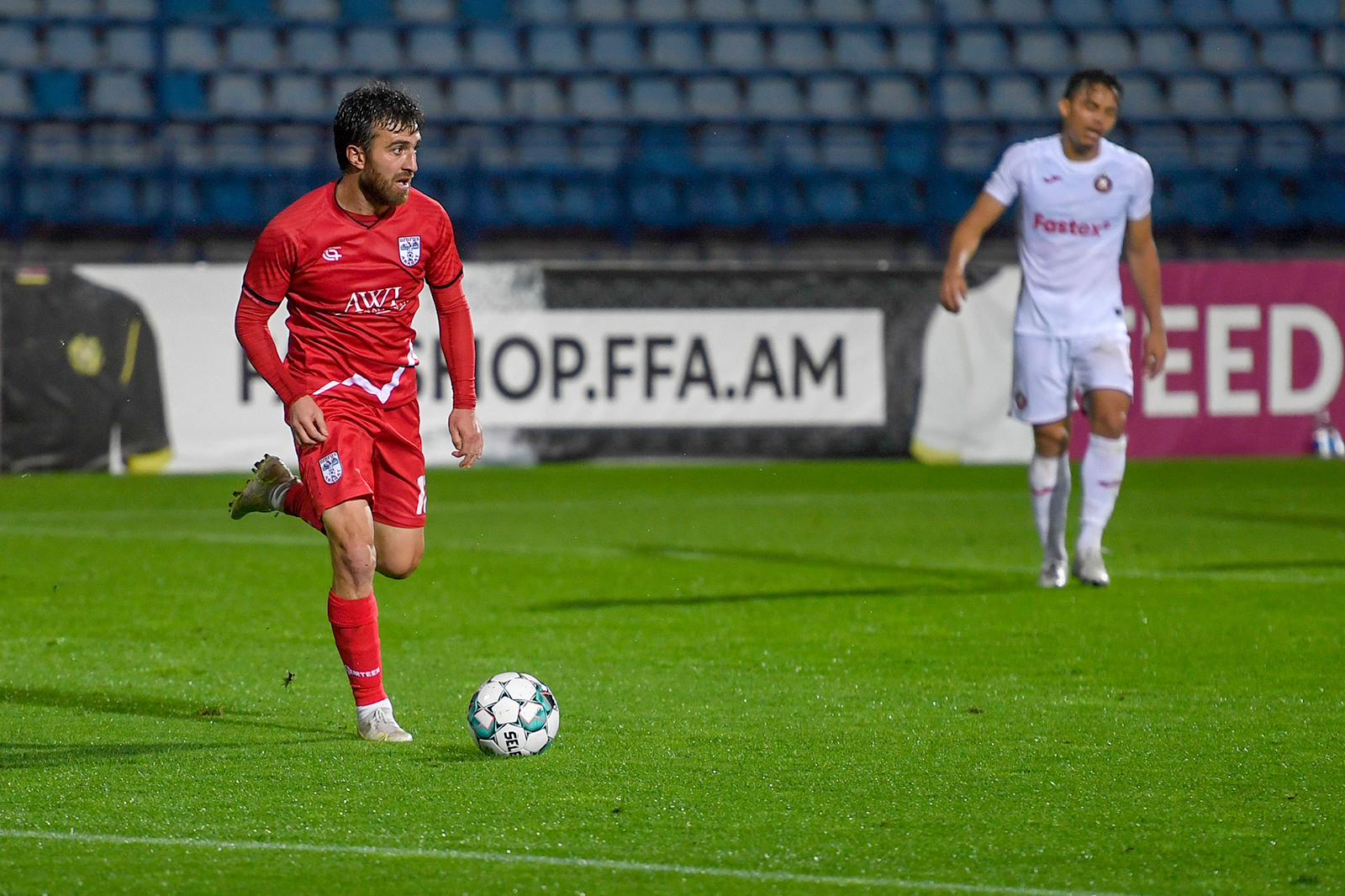
- Malakyan with Ararat Yerevan in 2022

Personal information
- Full name: Edgar Shavarshevich Malakyan
- Date of birth: 22 September 1990 (age 36)
- Place of birth: Yerevan, Soviet Armenia
- Height: 1.71 m (5 ft 7 in)
- Position: Winger

Team information
- Current team: Pyunik
- Number: 7

Senior career*
Years	Team	Apps	(Gls)
2007–2012	Pyunik	109	(12)
2012–2014	Viktoria Plzeň	6	(0)
2013	→ České Budějovice (loan)	5	(0)
2013–2014	→ Banants Yerevan (loan)	12	(4)
2014–2015	Alashkert	6	(2)
2015–2016	Shirak Gyumri	22	(2)
2016–2017	Stal Kamianske	52	(4)
2018	Zhetysu	31	(2)
2019	Petrolul Ploiești	4	(0)
2019–2020	Shirak	9	(0)
2020–2022	Ararat Yerevan	59	(10)
2023–	Pyunik	76	(11)

International career^{‡}
2008–2009	Armenia U19	2	(0)
2009–2012	Armenia U21	14	(3)
2009–	Armenia	21	(0)
- * Club domestic league appearances and goals as of 18 June 2026 ‡ National team caps and goals as of 11 June 2022

Edgar Malakyan (Armenian: Էդգար Մալաքյան; born 22 September 1990) is an Armenian professional footballer who plays as a midfielder for Pyunik, which he captains, and the Armenia national team.

== Club career ==
Edgar Malakyan is a graduate of the football school Pyunik Yerevan. Since 2008, he fully performed as part of the main team, being in the player base. Framework for action aimed at creating Malakyan attacking waves at the opponent. Possesses good dribbling, and knows how to play with a partner and take it to a rendezvous with the keeper. The first match in Pyunik happened in 2007. It was the only appearance Malakyan had in the team that season, which he spent in the double play in the First League. In the away match of the five round championship in 2010, against Banants Yerevan, he spent his 50th match in Pyunik in the Armenian Premier League. In that year, with the team they won the triple awards, winning the 2010 Armenian Premier League, the 2010 Armenian Cup and the 2010 Armenian Supercup.

In June 2012, Malakyan signed a three-year contract with Viktoria Plzeň. Agents from Viktoria noticed Edgar's match of 2nd preliminary round of the 2011–12 UEFA Champions League season, in which Viktoria won over Pyunik 4:0 and 5:1, Edgar showed himself to play well.

In the first league game against Hradec Králové on 29 July 2012, in which Victoria won 3–0 at home, Malakyan got injured. In the 3rd round of the 2012–13 Czech Cup on 26 September 2012 in a match against Chomutov, Malakyan came in when the score was a losing 1:2 and sharpened the game, gave the assists, and Victoria won 3–2. On 8 November, for his debut in the UEFA Europa League against Hapoel Tel Aviv, Malakyan came out on the field for 46 minutes. The match ended in favour of the players from Victoria 4–0.

In winter of 2013, he was loaned to another Czech club Dynamo České Budějovice.

In 2013–14, he was loaned to FC Banants. His performance there was so good that he decided to continue his career in Armenia permanently as he signed for Alashkert in 2015. After half a season, he was then traded to Shirak Gyumri, where he would finish relaunching his career in Armenia. Becoming team captain and having good performances in UEFA Europa League qualifying playoffs, he was then bought by Ukrainian Stal Kamianske alongside his younger brother, Gor. Since signing for the Ukrainian Premier League side in 2016, Edgar became a regular starter, key squad member and team captain as well. This eventually lead to him being called up for the Armenia national football team again after 5 years without playing for Armenia.

On 10 December 2022, Ararat Yerevan announced that Malakyan had left by mutual consent.

On 12 January 2023, Pyunik announced the return of Malakyan.

== International career ==
Malakyan debuted internationally on 12 August 2009 as part of the Armenia national football team in a friendly match against Moldova. He played in the first half, then was substituted by David Manoyan.

On 7 June 2011, Malakyan was the scorer of a double in the Armenia U21 youth team in a match against the Montenegro U21 youth team.

== Career statistics ==
=== International ===
As of 11 June 2022

Armenia
Year	Apps	Goals
2009	1	0
2010	4	0
2011	6	0
2012	2	0
2017	4	0
2018	3	0
2022	1	0
Total	21	0

== Honours ==
Pyunik

- Armenian Premier League (3): 2008, 2009, 2010, 2023–24
- Armenian Cup (2): 2009, 2010
- Armenian Supercup (3): 2008, 2010, 2011

Ararat Yerevan

- Armenian Cup (1): 2020–21
