= Varazdat Haroyan =

Armenian footballer

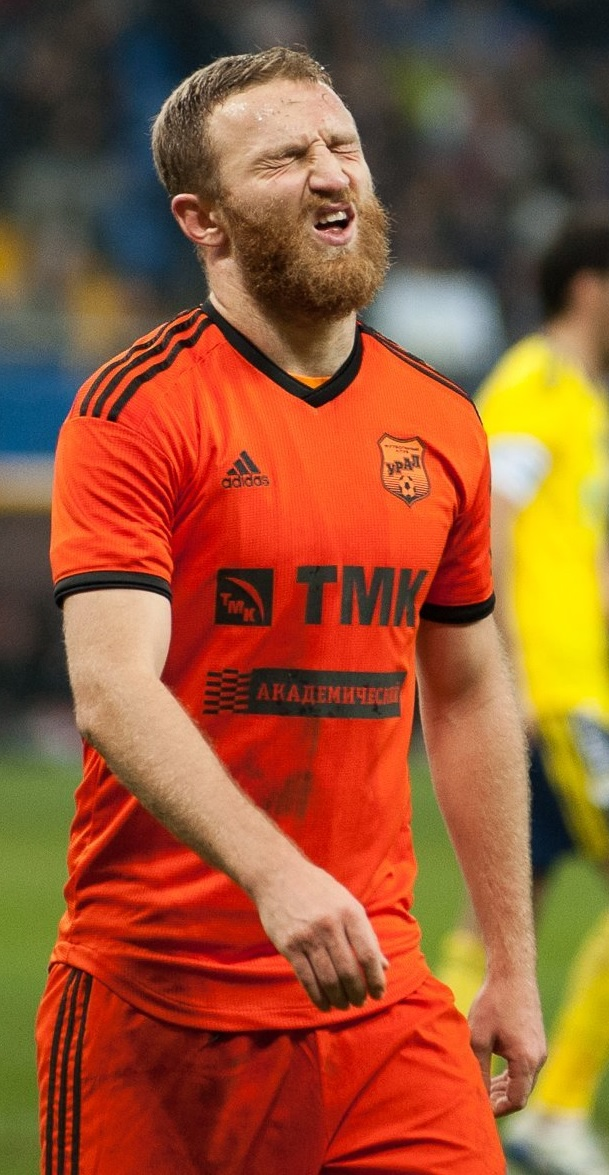
- Haroyan with Ural in 2019

Personal information
- Full name: Varazdat Arshakovich Haroyan
- Date of birth: 24 August 1992 (age 34)
- Place of birth: Yerevan, Armenia
- Height: 1.85 m (6 ft 1 in)
- Position: Centre back

Team information
- Current team: Ararat Yerevan
- Number: 33

Youth career
- –2008: Pyunik

Senior career*
Years	Team	Apps	(Gls)
2008	Patani	17	(2)
2009–2016	Pyunik	146	(7)
2016–2017	Padideh	25	(0)
2017–2020	Ural Yekaterinburg	55	(3)
2020	Tambov	8	(0)
2021	Astana	13	(1)
2021–2022	Cádiz	17	(1)
2022–2023	Anorthosis Famagusta	20	(1)
2023–2024	Astana	20	(1)
2024	Qingdao West Coast	27	(0)
2025	Pyunik Yerevan	10	(0)
2025	Kazincbarcika	9	(1)
2026–	Ararat Yerevan	0	(0)

International career^{‡}
2008–2009	Armenia U17	19	(2)
2009–2010	Armenia U19	3	(0)
2010–2012	Armenia U21	12	(0)
2011–2025	Armenia	92	(4)
- * Club domestic league appearances and goals as of 22 November 2025 ‡ National team caps and goals as of 9 June 2025

Varazdat Haroyan (Armenian: Վարազդատ Հարոյան, born on 24 August 1992) is an Armenian professional footballer who plays as a central defender for Armenian Premier League club Ararat Yerevan.

== Club career ==
=== Patani and Pyunik Yerevan ===
Varazdat Haroyan was born in Yerevan, and started football at the football school Pyunik Yerevan. In 2008, he played for Patani, for whom he made 17 appearances.

In 2009, he made his debut as a starter for Pyunik in the Armenian Premier League match against Gandzasar in Yerevan. Haroyan came off the bench in place of Arthur Yedigaryan at 90 minutes. That season Pyunik became the 2009 Armenian Premier League champion. Starting in 2010, Haroyan had always been a team regular, and becoming the 2010 Armenian Premier League champion and the winning the 2010 Armenian Cup and 2010 Armenian Supercup.

In March 2012, he became known to the interest of the German club 1. FC Köln, which sent an official invitation to Haroyan. Haroyan was earlier invited to attend the viewing, but in March 2012, decided to go to Germany.

=== Padideh ===
On 6 June 2016, Haroyan signed a two–year contract with Persian Gulf Pro League side Tractor Sazi. However, just one day later the transfer was cancelled by Tractor Sazi management after Tractor Sazi's supporters protests due to historical conflicts between Armenian and Azerbaijani ethnic.

Just hours after Haroyan's contract with Tractor Sazi were cancelled, he joined to another Iranian club, Mashhad based Padideh.

=== Ural Yekaterinburg ===
On 5 July 2017, he signed a contract with the Russian Premier League club FC Ural Yekaterinburg. On 22 September 2020, his contract with Ural was terminated by mutual consent.

Days after leaving Ural, Haroyan postponed a transfer to Greek club AEL Larissa due to the 2020 Nagorno-Karabakh conflict. He later clarified that he was not enlisting to fight in the conflict.

=== Tambov ===
On 6 October 2020, Haroyan joined Russian Premier League club Tambov.

=== Astana ===
On 15 February 2021, Astana announced the signing of Haroyan.

=== Cadiz ===
On 27 May 2021, Cádiz announced the signing of Haroyan from Astana, on a two-year contract, with Astana confirming his departure from their club on 24 June 2021. He made his La Liga debut for Cádiz, starting in a 1–1 draw against Levante on 14 August 2021. Cádiz and Haroyan terminated their contract on 4 July 2022.

=== Anorthosis Famagusta ===
On 12 July 2022, Haroyan signed with Cypriot First Division club Anorthosis Famagusta on a two-year contract until 2024. On 17 March 2023, Haroyan left Anorthosis Famagusta by mutual consent.

=== Astana Return ===
On 21 March 2023, Haroyan returned to sign for Astana. On 11 January 2024, Astana announced that Haroyan had left the club.

=== Qingdao West Coast ===
On 4 February 2024, Haroyan joined Chinese Super League club Qingdao West Coast.

=== Kazincbarcika ===
On 10 July 2025, Haroyan joined Nemzeti Bajnokság I club Kazincbarcikai SC. On 24 November 2025, Kazincbarcikai announced that Haroyan had left the club by mutual agreement.

=== Ararat Yerevan ===
On 7 July 2026, Armenian Premier League club Ararat Yerevan announced the signing of Haroyan.

== International career ==
Haroyan made his debut for the Armenia national team on 10 August 2011 in a friendly match against Lithuania. He made his debut in official matches on 11 June 2013 in their 4–0 win against Denmark.

On 9 September 2025, after 14 years of playing and more than 30 games as captain of the national team, Haroyan announced his retirement from the Armenian national team due to disagreements with Yegishe Melikyan, the new coach of the Armenian national team.

== Career statistics ==
=== Club ===
As of match played 15 December 2023

Appearances and goals by club, season and competition
Club	Season	League			Cup		Continental		Other		Total	
Club	Season	Division	Apps	Goals	Apps	Goals	Apps	Goals	Apps	Goals	Apps	Goals
Pyunik	2009	Armenian Premier League	5	0	0	0	–		0 (Note: Appearances in the Armenian Supercup)	0	5	0
Pyunik	2010	Armenian Premier League	17	0	2	0	1 (Note: Appearances in the UEFA Champions League)	0	0	0	20	0
Pyunik	2011	Armenian Premier League	27	2	2	0	2	0	0	0	31	2
Pyunik	2012–13	Armenian Premier League	26	2	4	0	0 (Note: Appearances in the UEFA Europa League)	0	–		30	2
Pyunik	2013–14	Armenian Premier League	25	2	5	0	4	0	0	0	34	2
Pyunik	2014–15	Armenian Premier League	24	0	5	1	2	0	0	0	31	1
Pyunik	2015–16	Armenian Premier League	22	1	0	0	4	0	1	0	27	1
Pyunik	Total		146	7	18	1	13	0	1	0	178	8
Padideh	2016–17	Persian Gulf Pro League	25	0	0	0	–		–		25	0
Ural Yekaterinburg	2017–18	Russian Premier League	20	1	0	0	–		–		20	1
Ural Yekaterinburg	2018–19	Russian Premier League	16	1	5	0	–		–		21	1
Ural Yekaterinburg	2019–20	Russian Premier League	18	1	2	0	–		–		20	1
Ural Yekaterinburg	2020–21	Russian Premier League	1	0	0	0	–		–		1	0
Ural Yekaterinburg	Total		55	3	7	0	-	-	-	-	62	3
Tambov	2020–21	Russian Premier League	8	0	1	0	–		–		9	0
Astana	2021	Kazakhstan Premier League	13	1	0	0	0 (Note: Appearances in the UEFA Europa Conference League)	0	2 (Note: Appearances in the Kazakhstan Super Cup)	0	15	1
Cádiz	2021–22	La Liga	17	1	2	0	–		–		19	1
Anorthosis	2022–23	Cypriot First Division	20	1	2	0	–		–		22	1
Astana	2023	Kazakhstan Premier League	20	1	4	0	5 (Note: One appearance in the UEFA Champions League, zero appearances in the UEFA Europa League, and four appearances in the UEFA Europa Conference League)	0	0	0	29	1
Kazincbarcika	2025–26	Nemzeti Bajnokság I	0	0	0	0	–		–		0	0
Career total			304	14	34	1	18	0	5	0	359	15

=== International ===
As of match played 9 June 2025

Appearances and goals by national team and year
National team	Year	Apps	Goals
Armenia	2011	1	0
Armenia	2012	1	0
Armenia	2013	5	0
Armenia	2014	9	0
Armenia	2015	2	0
Armenia	2016	8	1
Armenia	2017	5	1
Armenia	2018	10	0
Armenia	2019	9	0
Armenia	2020	5	0
Armenia	2021	8	1
Armenia	2022	8	0
Armenia	2023	8	0
Armenia	2024	10	1
Armenia	2025	3	0
Total		92	4

Scores and results list Armenia's goal tally first, score column indicates score after each Haroyan goal.

List of international goals scored by Varazdat Haroyan
No.	Date	Venue	Opponent	Score	Result	Competition
1	11 November 2016	Vazgen Sargsyan Republican Stadium, Yerevan, Armenia	Montenegro	2–2	3–2	2018 FIFA World Cup qualification
2	13 November 2017	Vazgen Sargsyan Republican Stadium, Yerevan, Armenia	Cyprus	2–0	3–2	Friendly
3	31 March 2021	Vazgen Sargsyan Republican Stadium, Yerevan, Armenia	Romania	2–2	3–2	2022 FIFA World Cup qualification
4	4 June 2024	Stožice Stadium, Ljubljana, Slovenia	Slovenia	1–1	1–2	Friendly

== Honours ==
Pyunik Yerevan

- Armenian Premier League: 2009, 2010, 2014–15
- Armenian Cup: 2009, 2010, 2012–13, 2013–14, 2014–15
- Armenian Supercup: 2010, 2011, 2015

Individual

- Armenian Footballer of the Year: 2021
