= Artak Yedigaryan =

Armenian footballer

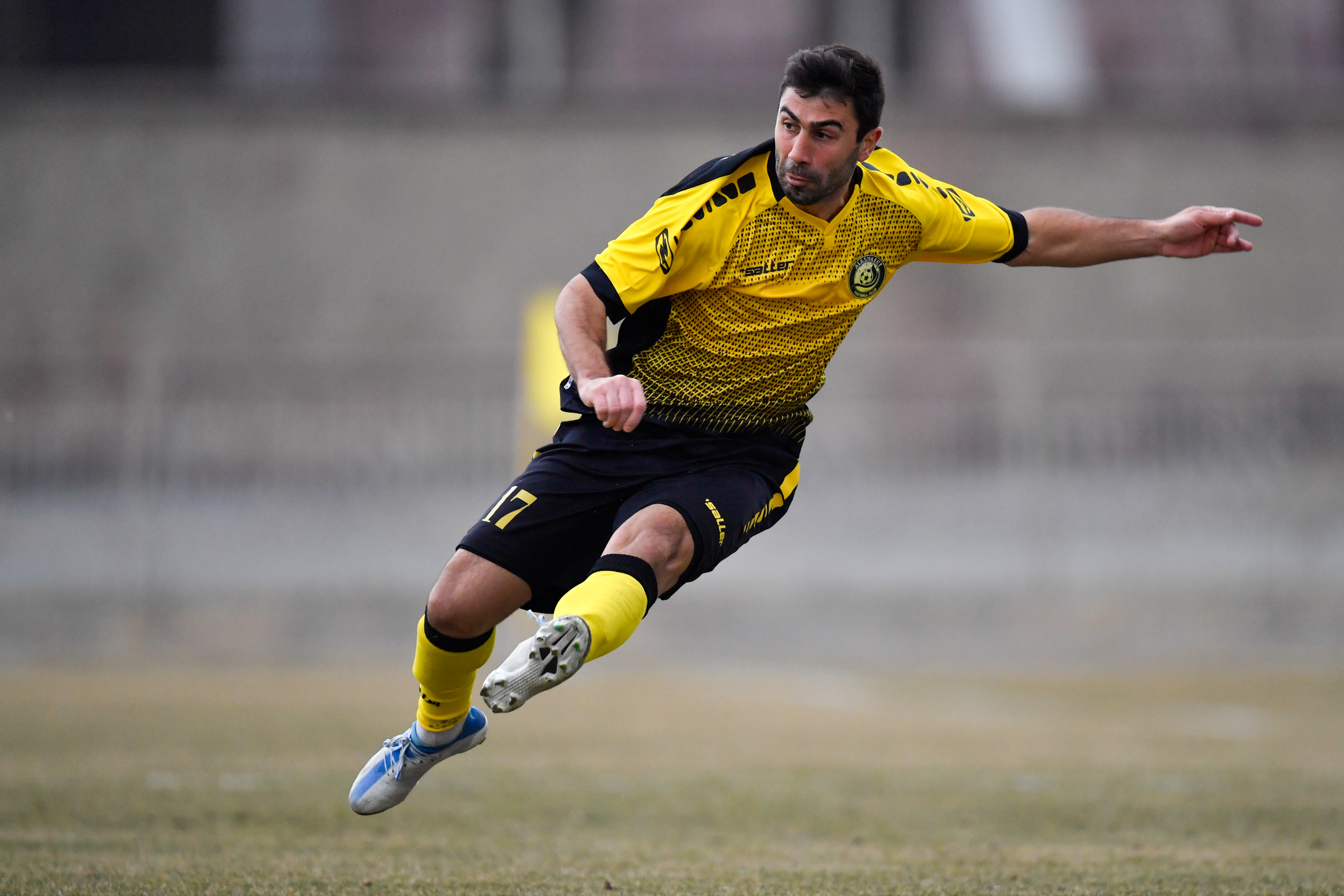

Personal information
- Full name: Artak Geġami Yedigaryan
- Date of birth: 18 March 1990 (age 36)
- Place of birth: Yerevan, Armenian SSR
- Height: 1.76 m (5 ft 9 in)
- Positions: Full-back; midfielder

Senior career*
Years	Team	Apps	(Gls)
2007–2012	Pyunik	83	(10)
2012–2013	Metalurh Donetsk	9	(0)
2013	Pyunik	20	(1)
2013–2014	Banants	13	(1)
2014–2015	Žalgiris Vilnius	20	(0)
2015–2019	Alashkert	109	(31)
2019–2020	Pyunik	17	(4)
2020–2021	Ararat Yerevan	17	(0)
2021–2024	Alashkert	84	(16)
2024–2025	Gandzasar Kapan	11	(0)

International career^{‡}
2008–2008	Armenia U19	3	(0)
2009–2012	Armenia U21	13	(1)
2010–2019	Armenia	32	(1)
- * Club domestic league appearances and goals as of 12 December 2024 ‡ National team caps and goals as of 18 November 2019 (UTC)

Artak Yedigaryan (Armenian: Արտակ Եդիգարյան; born on 18 March 1990) is an Armenian former professional footballer who played as a full-back.

== Club career ==
Artak was born in Yerevan in a family of football players, which naturally affected his future. Also an important factor is that the Yedigaryan lived in a house that is located next to the Republican Stadium.

=== Pyunik ===
Yedigaryan is a graduate from the football school Pyunik Yerevan. Early in his career, he played for the reserves. After spending two seasons there, he was transferred to the first team. At the beginning of the 2009 Armenian Premier League season, he went on replacements, and then began to appear in the first team, but not for the entire first match. In the second round, he almost staked a place at the base. Direct participation of Yedigaryan allowed Pyunik to score a hat-trick in the 2010 season, when the team won the 2010 Armenian Premier League, 2010 Armenian Cup and 2010 Armenian Supercup.

=== Metalurh Donetsk ===
In the summer of 2012, along with Pyunik teammate David Manoyan, he held interest in the Metalurh Donetsk. Manoyan later went on to play for Kuban Krasnodar, but the game of Yedigaryan attracted the attention of the coaching staff of Metalurh. In the near future, he was to be signed a contract between the parties on both sides. On 9 July, in the conference room of a training base of FC Metalurh, the club's sporting director Vardan Israelyan and head coach Vladimir Pyatenko presented five newcomers, one of whom was Artak Yedigaryan. The agreement contract was for 3 years. He played on the team as number 21.

=== Return to Pyunik ===
In 2013, Yedigaryan was transferred from Metalurh Donetsk back to Pyunik Yerevan for an undisclosed fee.

=== Žalgiris Vilnius ===
In January 2014, Yedigaryan joined reigning Lithuanian champions VMFD Žalgiris Vilnius.

=== Alashkert ===
On 18 August 2015, Yedigaryan signed a one-year contract with the Armenian Premier League side Alashkert FC. On 5 June 2019, Yedigaryan was released by Alashkert along with six other players.

=== Return to Pyunik ===
Ahead of the 2019/20 season, Yedigaryan returned to FC Pyunik.

At the end of May 2025, he announced the end of his career.

== International career ==
On 25 May 2010, Yedigaryan made his debut in the Armenia national football team. In a friendly game against the national team of Uzbekistan, Artak came from the first minute and played the entire match. Afterwards, the Armenian team celebrated the victory with a score of 3–1.

== Personal life ==
Artak's brother Arthur Yedigaryan also plays for the Armenia national football team. Their father, Gegham Yedigaryan, was a Soviet football player and their grandfather Felix Veranyan was also a football player and is currently a football manager. Artak is married to a woman named Shushan.

== Career statistics ==
=== International ===
As of match played 18 November 2019

Appearances and goals by national team and year
National team	Year	Apps	Goals
Armenia	2010	5	0
Armenia	2011	3	0
Armenia	2012	7	0
Armenia	2013	1	0
Armenia	2014	1	0
Armenia	2016	4	0
Armenia	2017	6	1
Armenia	2018	3	0
Armenia	2019	2	0
Total		32	1

Scores and results list Armenia's goal tally first.

No	Date	Venue	Opponent	Score	Result	Competition
1.	4 June 2017	Vazgen Sargsyan Republican Stadium, Yerevan, Armenia	Saint Kitts and Nevis	5–0	5–0	Friendly

== Honours ==
Pyunik Yerevan

- Armenian Premier League: 2007, 2008, 2009, 2010
- Armenian Cup: 2009, 2010, 2012–13
- Armenian Supercup: 2007, 2008, 2010

Žalgiris Vilnius

- A Lyga: 2014
- Lithuanian Football Cup: 2013–14, 2014–15

Alashkert FC

- Armenian Premier League: 2015–16, 2016–17, 2017–18,
- Armenian Cup: 2018–19
- Armenian Supercup: 2016
