= 2011 in Armenian football =

Football in Armenia
- Season: 2011

Men's football
- Premier League: Ulisses
- First League: Shengavit
- Cup: Mika
- Supercup: Pyunik

The following article presents a summary of the 2011 football (soccer) season in Armenia, which was the 20th season of competitive football in the country.

== National teams ==
=== Armenia ===
Date	Venue	Opponents	Score	Armenia scorer(s)	Report
Friendly matches
9 February 2011	Tsirion Stadium, Limassol (N)	Georgia	1–2	Manucharyan	FFA.am
10 August 2011	Darius Girėnas, Kaunas (A)	Lithuania	0–3		FFA.am
UEFA Euro 2012 qualifying
26 March 2011	Republican Stadium, Yerevan (H)	Russia	0–0		UEFA.com
4 June 2011	Petrovsky Stadium, Saint Petersburg (A)	Russia	1–3	Pizzelli	UEFA.com
2 September 2011	Estadi Comunal, Andorra la Vella (A)	Andorra	3–0	Pizzelli, Ghazaryan, Mkhitaryan	UEFA.com
6 September 2011	Stadium Pod Dubňom, Žilina (A)	Slovakia	4–0	Movsisyan, Mkhitaryan, Ghazaryan, Sarkisov	UEFA.com
7 October 2011	Republican Stadium, Yerevan (H)	Macedonia	4–1	Pizzelli, Mkhitaryan, Ghazaryan, Sarkisov	UEFA.com
11 October 2011	Aviva Stadium, Dublin (A)	Republic of Ireland	1–2	Mkhitaryan	UEFA.com

=== Armenia U21 ===
Date	Venue	Opponents	Score	Armenia scorer(s)	Report
2013 UEFA European Under-21 Football Championship qualification - Group stage
7 June 2011	Republican Stadium, Yerevan (H)	Montenegro	4–1	Malakyan (2), H. Hovhannisyan, Poghosyan	UEFA.com
3 September 2011	Estadi Comunal, Andorra la Vella (A)	Andorra	1–0	Poghosyan	UEFA.com
6 September 2011	Městský fotbalový stadion, Uherské Hradiště (A)	Czech Republic	1–1	Malakyan	UEFA.com
11 November 2011	Republican Stadium, Yerevan (H)	Czech Republic	0–2		UEFA.com
15 November 2011	Republican Stadium, Yerevan (H)	Wales	0–0		UEFA.com

=== Armenia U19 ===
Date	Venue	Opponents	Score	Armenia scorer(s)	Report
2012 UEFA European Under-19 Football Championship qualifying round
21 October 2011	Republican Stadium, Yerevan (H)	Slovakia	2–1	H. Hovhannisyan (2)	UEFA.com
23 October 2011	Republican Stadium, Yerevan (H)	Greece	1–2	H. Hovhannisyan	UEFA.com
26 October 2011	Republican Stadium, Yerevan (H)	Andorra	1–0	Papikyan	UEFA.com

=== Armenia U17 ===
Date	Venue	Opponents	Score	Armenia scorer(s)	Report
2012 UEFA European Under-17 Football Championship qualifying round
17 October 2011	Stadion Suvača, Pećinci (A)	Wales	3–2	Harutyunyan (2), Bakalyan	UEFA.com
19 October 2011	Stadion Suvača, Pećinci (A)	Serbia	1–2	Minasyan	UEFA.com
21 October 2011	Stadion Suvača, Pećinci (A)	Lithuania	0–4		UEFA.com

== League tables ==
=== Premier League ===
Pos	Team	Pld	W	D	L	GF	GA	GD	Pts	Qualification
1	Ulisses (C)	28	15	8	5	38	22	+16	53	Qualification for the Champions League second qualifying round
2	Pyunik	28	12	10	6	33	28	+5	46	Qualification for the Europa League first qualifying round
3	Gandzasar Kapan	28	12	10	6	31	18	+13	46	Qualification for the Europa League first qualifying round
4	Banants	28	12	8	8	42	30	+12	44	
5	Mika	28	12	8	8	36	25	+11	44	
6	Impulse	28	10	7	11	37	36	+1	37	
7	Shirak	28	6	7	15	27	42	−15	25	Qualification for the Europa League first qualifying round (Note: Winners of 2011–12 Armenian Cup qualified for the first qualifying round of the UEFA Europa League.)
8	Ararat Yerevan	28	2	4	22	14	57	−43	10	

Rules for classification: 1) points; 2) goal difference; 3) number of goals scored.
(C) Champions

=== First League ===
Pos	Team	Pld	W	D	L	GF	GA	GD	Pts
1	Shengavit (C)	24	17	2	5	53	24	+29	53
2	Mika-2	24	13	7	4	51	19	+32	46
3	Pyunik-2	24	12	3	9	44	30	+14	39
4	Shirak-2	24	10	7	7	29	25	+4	37
5	Gandzasar-2	24	11	3	10	48	42	+6	36
6	Impulse-2	24	10	5	9	38	40	−2	35
7	Banants-2	24	10	4	10	35	35	0	34
8	Pyunik-3	24	6	1	17	27	61	−34	19
9	Ararat-2	24	2	2	20	15	64	−49	8

Rules for classification: 1) points; 2) goal difference; 3) number of goals scored.
(C) Champions

== Armenian clubs in Europe ==
=== Summary ===
Club	Competition	Final round
Pyunik	UEFA Champions League	Second qualifying round
Mika	UEFA Europa League	Second qualifying round
Banants	UEFA Europa League	First qualifying round
Ulisses	UEFA Europa League	First qualifying round

=== Pyunik ===
Date	Venue	Opponents	Score	Pyunik scorer(s)	Report
2011–12 Champions League - Second qualifying round
12 July 2011	Republican Stadium, Yerevan (H)	(Czech Republic) Viktoria Plzeň	0–4		UEFA.com
19 July 2011	Stadion města Plzně, Plzeň (A)	(Czech Republic) Viktoria Plzeň	1–5	Malakyan	UEFA.com

=== Mika ===
Date	Venue	Opponents	Score	Mika scorer(s)	Report
2011–12 Europa League - Second qualifying round
14 July 2011	Ullevaal Stadion, Oslo (A)	(Norway) Vålerenga	0–1		UEFA.com
21 July 2011	Mika Stadium, Yerevan (H)	(Norway) Vålerenga	0–1		UEFA.com

=== Banants ===
Date	Venue	Opponents	Score	Banants scorer(s)	Report
2011–12 Europa League - First qualifying round
30 June 2011	Republican Stadium, Yerevan (H)	(Georgia (country)) Metalurgi Rustavi	0–1		UEFA.com
7 July 2011	Poladi Stadium, Rustavi (A)	(Georgia (country)) Metalurgi Rustavi	1–1	Du Bala	UEFA.com

=== Ulisses ===
Date	Venue	Opponents	Score	Ulisses scorer(s)	Report
2011–12 Europa League - First qualifying round
30 June 2011	Stadion Albert Flórián, Budapest (A)	(Hungary) Ferencváros	0–3		UEFA.com
7 July 2011	Hrazdan Stadium, Yerevan (H)	(Hungary) Ferencváros	0–2		UEFA.com
