= Vardan Minasyan =

Armenian footballer (born 1974)

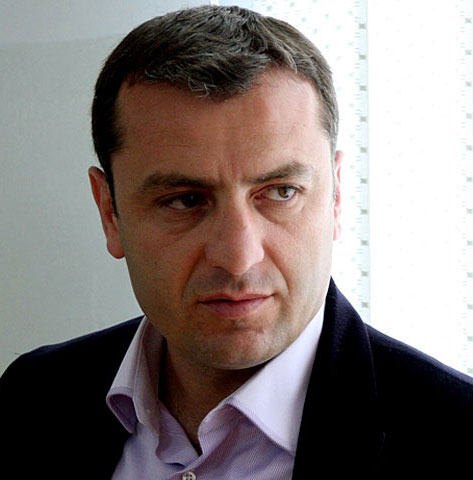

Personal information
- Date of birth: 5 January 1974 (age 52)
- Place of birth: Yerevan, Armenian SSR, Soviet Union
- Height: 1.76 m (5 ft 9 in)
- Position: Midfielder

Senior career*
| Years | Team | Apps | (Gls) |
| 1991–1992 | Zangezour Goris | 20 | (4) |
| 1992–1998 | Pyunik Yerevan | 153 | (23) |
| 1998 | FC Yerevan | 26 | (2) |
| 1998–1999 | Lausanne Sports | 10 | (0) |
| 1999–2000 | Lokomotiv St. Petersburg | 36 | (2) |
| 2001–2003 | Pyunik Yerevan | 44 | (22) |
| Total | | 261 | (53) |

International career
| 1996–2003 | Armenia | 11 | (0) |

Managerial career
- 2004–2005: Armenia U21
- 2006–2009: Armenia (assistant)
- 2008–2011: Pyunik
- 2009–2013: Armenia
- 2014–2015: Tobol
- 2018: Armenia
- 2018–2020: Ararat-Armenia
- 2021: Taraz
- 2023: Telavi
- 2023–2025: Ararat-Armenia
- * Club domestic league appearances and goals

Vardan Minasyan (Armenian: Վարդան Մինասյան; born 5 January 1974) is an Armenian football manager and former player.

He played as a midfielder in his native Armenia, in Switzerland and in Russia.

Minasyan has been largely credited for advancing Armenia international and domestic football. He led Armenia to a record 3rd-place finish in Euro 2012 qualifications, where Armenia scored 22 goals, in his first qualification cycle. Minasyan was also the longest serving manager of the Armenian national squad to date and has the best match record of all the former managers of the national team. When he resigned in October 2013 after the FIFA 2014 qualifications, Armenia was ranked #38 by FIFA, the highest rank in the Armenia national team's history.

== Club career ==
Vardan Minasyan had played for several clubs in the Armenian Premier League. His main achievements had been made playing for Pyunik Yerevan. Minasyan was a member of Pyunik before going abroad and after returning from abroad. He played for one season in Swiss Super League club Lausanne Sports, which won the Swiss Cup, and later moved to Lokomotiv St. Petersburg, which he played on for nearly two years.

== International career ==
Minasyan was a member of the Armenia national team. He participated in 11 international matches since his debut in an away friendly match against Peru on 20 June 1996.

== Managerial career ==
Minasyan began his coaching career as head coach of the Armenia U-21 youth national team in August 2004. He resigned in 2005, and a year later became assistant coach at the club for which he spent the last years of his life as a football player, Pyunik Yerevan. He also worked as assistant coach for head coach Ian Porterfield, along with Englishman Tom Jones, for the Armenia national football team. In September 2007, Porterfield died. Minasyan and Jones became the acting head coach and assistant coach, respectively, before the end of the year. In early 2008, the new head coach, Danish specialist Jan Poulsen, was invited and Minasyan went back to his position as assistant head coach. In March next year, Poulsen was fired because of poor results and Minasyan again temporarily (at the time) became the head coach. Minasyan learned much about managing from Samvel Darbinyan and Ian Porterfield.

=== Pyunik ===
In June 2008, Minasyan was replaced as head coach of Pyunik by Armen Gyulbudagyants after a defeat against Gandzasar Kapan. Throughout the season, he led the club to victory over Ararat Yerevan for the 2008 Armenian Premier League title. In 2009, Pyunik once again won the Armenian Premier League, defeating Mika Yerevan in the 2009 Armenian Premier League finals. At a ceremony on 22 December, Vardan was awarded a special prize by the organization Telecom, naming him the best coach of Armenia for 2009.

With Minasyan as coach, Pyunik won the Armenian Premier League in 2008, 2009 and 2010, the Armenian Cup in 2009 and 2010 and the Armenian Supercup in 2010 and 2011. Also, at the end of the year, the national team, led by Minasyan, performed better in comparison with the previous matches. For good performances and matches won awards given by the Football Federation of Armenia, Minasyan made the list for the best coach of the season. In the final result for the best coach of the season, Minasyan unanimously won first place.

In November 2011, Minasyan as head coach of Pyunik, succeeded Suren Chakhalyan Minassian and was also appointed Technical Director of the club. Chakhalyan, in turn, after spending a year in the position, was fired on 8 September 2012 from his post for violating athletic discipline. On the same day, the club officially announced the temporary appointment to the post of Vardan Minasyan.

=== Armenia ===
On 10 February, after the draw for the qualifying round teams of the UEFA Euro 2012, by order of the President of the Football Federation of Armenia Ruben Hayrapetyan, Minasyan will continue to lead the Armenian national squad, only now as the official head coach. Armenian NT in FIFA World Rank was 125th.

In the UEFA Euro 2012 qualifying matches, Minasyan led Armenia to several upset victories over Slovakia, Macedonia and Andorra and a tie against Russia. The team almost made the final draw, but controversially lost in a decisive match against Ireland 1–2. Armenian goalkeeper Roman Berezovsky was given a red card a few minutes after the game began for touching the ball, even though he didn't and Ireland striker Simon Cox in fact did, as he would later admit. Berezovsky was switched with 19-year-old debuting Arsen Petrosyan. Valeri Aleksanyan later accidentally scored an own goal on Petrosyan, which ended up deciding the match. The Football Federation of Armenia unsuccessfully filed protest over the match. Despite not getting to play in the Euro 2012, Minasyan brought the Armenia national team to a record #41 FIFA ranking and placed the team in third place in the group stage. Minasyan stated he is proud of the entire team. They were all welcomed in the airport back in Armenia as heroes.

Minasyan continued to lead the Armenia national team during the 2014 FIFA World Cup qualification cycle. The team finished with 4 wins and 13 points, another all-time best performance under Minasyan. Armenia also ended the qualification matches ranked 38th by FIFA, the highest spot in the Armenian squad's history. This was the second time Minasyan had set a new record for the FIFA rank of Armenia. On 21 October 2013, ten days before his contract was set to expire, Minasyan resigned from the national team. He stated he had received several offers from abroad and wanted to discuss them. Minasyan thanked the Armenian fans, media and players, stating "It has been a great pleasure for me to work with them. Together we passed along a road which, I believe, was useful. They have a great potential, they are professionals, and I am confident that they still will climb great heights".

=== Tobol ===
Minasyan was sacked as manager of FC Tobol on 16 April 2015.

=== Ararat-Armenia ===
On 1 October 2018, Minasyan was appointed as the new head coach of FC Ararat-Armenia, where he signed a 2-year contract. Under his management, FC Ararat-Armenia became the first Armenian Premier League team to advance to the playoff round of a major European club tournament. On 17 July 2020, Minasyan left Ararat-Armenia after his contract expired.

=== Ararat-Armenia return ===
On 17 June 2023, Ararat-Armenia announced the return of Minasyan as their head coach. On 28 May 2025, Minasyan left Ararat-Armenia again after his contract expired.

== Honours ==
=== Player ===
Kilikia

- Armenian Premier League: 1992, 1995–96, 1996–97
- Armenian Cup: 1995–96
- Armenian Supercup: 1997

Pyunik Yerevan

- Armenian Premier League: 2001, 2002, 2003
- Armenian Cup: 2002
- Armenian Supercup: 2002

Lausanne Sports

- Swiss Cup: 1998

=== Manager ===
Pyunik Yerevan

- Armenian Premier League: 2008, 2009, 2010
- Armenian Cup: 2009, 2010
- Armenian Supercup: 2010, 2011

Ararat-Armenia

- Armenian Premier League: 2018–19, 2019–20
- Armenian Supercup: 2019, 2024

=== Individual ===
- Armenian Footballer of the Year: 2001
- Best Football Coach of Armenia: 2009, 2010, 2011, 2019

== Managerial statistics ==
As of 9 September 2018

| Team | From | To | Record | | | | |
| Team | From | To | G | W | D | L | Win % |
|---|---|---|---|---|---|---|---|
| Armenia | 2018 | 2018 | 4 | 1 | 2 | 1 | 25.00 |
| Total | | | 4 | 1 | 2 | 1 | 25.00 |
