= David Manoyan =

Armenian footballer

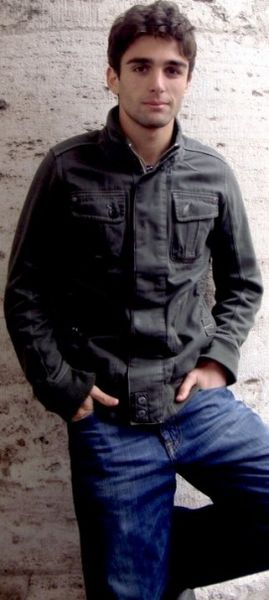

Personal information
- Date of birth: 5 July 1990 (age 36)
- Place of birth: Yerevan, Armenian SSR, Soviet Union
- Height: 1.74 m (5 ft 9 in)
- Position: Midfielder

Team information
- Current team: Cilicia
- Number: 18

Youth career
- –2007: Pyunik-2

Senior career*
Years	Team	Apps	(Gls)
2008–2012	Pyunik	59	(3)
2012–2013	FC Kuban Krasnodar	0	(0)
2012	→ Pyunik (loan)	12	(5)
2013–2016	Pyunik	67	(14)
2016–2017	Karmiotissa	22	(1)
2017–2018	Nea Salamis	9	(0)
2018	Alashkert	4	(0)
2018	Sandecja	9	(0)
2019	Rabotnichki	16	(0)
2019	Noah	10	(2)
2020	Shirak	13	(0)
2020–2023	Ararat Yerevan	74	(2)
2020	→ Shirak (loan)	0	(0)
2023–2024	Van	17	(1)
2024–	Cilicia	0	(0)

International career
2008–2009	Armenia U19	2	(0)
2009–2011	Armenia U21	8	(1)
2009–2017	Armenia	26	(0)
- * Club domestic league appearances and goals as of 23 February 2024

David Manoyan (Armenian: Դավիթ Մանոյան, born 5 July 1990) is an Armenian professional footballer who plays as a midfielder for Cilicia.

== Early life ==
David Manoyan was born on 5 July 1990 in Yerevan, Armenian SSR. Manoyan spent some time swimming before he started playing football. He has a little brother, Vahagn Manoyan, who also plays football.

== Club career ==
Manoyan was part of the FC Pyunik youth system. In 2007, he signed a contract with the club and spent a full season in the First League. He later joined the Pyunik first team in 2008. During his time on Pyunik, Manoyan scored three goals and was part of the team when they won the 2008 Armenian Premier League and 2009 Armenian Premier League, as well as the 2009 Armenian Supercup and 2009 Armenian Cup. After the championship, the number of professionals recognized the opening of the season. At the headquarters of the Football Federation of Armenia, a ceremony of awarding the winners at the end of the football season 2009 was hosted. Manoyan was awarded the "Discovery of the Year" and "The most promising footballer" awards. Manoyan built through most of the attacks that result in the most goals. In November 2009, an injury of the knee, which was operated by Germany, at a clinic in Hamburg. In March 2010, talks were held for Manoyan to be transferred to German club VfB Stuttgart. Manoyan later showed interest in Swiss club FC Sion. Manoyan decided to remain with Pyunik for another season, in which Pyunik again won the 2010 Armenian Premier League, as well as the 2010 Armenian Supercup and 2010 Armenian Cup.

In the summer of 2012, along with Pyunik teammate Artak Yedigaryan, he held view in interest of Metalurh Donetsk. Yedigaryan's game attracted the coaching staff of Metalurh and Manoyan later decided to play for Kuban Krasnodar. On 9 August 2012, Manoyan signed a three-year contract with Kuban. Manoyan was put on loan to Pyunik on 3 September 2012 for a period of six months that same year and later became the captain of Pyunik. He underwent knee surgery in Germany on 10 December 2012 due to an injury and was sitting out for a while.

On 8 February 2018, Manoyan joined the Armenian Premier League side FC Alashkert after signing a 1.5-year contract. On 9 December 2019, Manoyan was released by FC Noah.

He did not play for Noah in the last two months, and then signed with Shirak SC in January 2020. On 25 July 2020, Manoyan was sold to Shirak's cooperative club Ararat Yerevan. However, Ararat revealed on 25 August 2020 that Manoyan was one out of seven players that would be loaned out to Shirak SC for a few days, to help them with their Europa League qualifying game against FCSB, which Shirak lost. Manoyen then returned to Ararat a few days later.

On 23 February 2023, Manoyen left Ararat Yerevan, signing for FC Van on 29 March 2023.

== International career ==
Manoyan made his debut for the Armenia national team on 11 February 2009 in a friendly game against Latvia. Manoyan stepped on the field at the 80th minute of the match, replacing Edgar Manucharyan. The match took place in Cyprus and ended with the score 0:0.

== Honours ==
Pyunik

- Armenian Premier League : 2008, 2009, 2010, 2014–15
- Armenian Cup: 2009, 2010, 2012–13, 2013–14, 2014–15
- Armenian Supercup: 2008, 2015

Alashkert

- Armenian Premier League: 2017–18

Noah

- Armenian Cup: 2019–20

Ararat

- Armenian Cup: 2020–21

Individual

- 2009 Discovery of the Year
- 2009 The most promising footballer

== Filmography ==
Music videos
Year	Title	Artist	Role
2022	"Sirt"	Iveta Mukuchyan	Love interest

Music videos
Year	Title	Artist	Role
2021	"Клянусь любить"	Карен Боксян	Влюблённая пара
