= 2009 Armenian First League =

Football league season

The 2009 Armenian First League season began on 9 April 2009 and ended on 6 November 2009.

== Overview ==
- Impuls Dilijan returned to professional football.
- Shengavit represent the reserves of Ulisses FC.

== League table ==
Pos	Team	Pld	W	D	L	GF	GA	GD	Pts	Promotion
1	Impuls	24	18	4	2	57	22	+35	58	Promotion to Armenian Premier League
2	Shengavit	24	16	4	4	59	32	+27	52	
3	Pyunik-2	24	12	4	8	58	30	+28	40	
4	Banants-2	24	12	3	9	43	24	+19	39	
5	Mika-2	24	10	5	9	36	33	+3	35	
6	Gandzasar-2	24	10	2	12	41	48	−7	32	
7	Pyunik-3	24	8	2	14	40	58	−18	26	
8	Shirak-2	24	4	3	17	21	60	−39	15	
9	Banants-3	24	3	3	18	22	70	−48	12	
10	Ararat-2	0	-	-	-	-	-	—	0	Withdrew before the start of the season

== Top goalscorers ==
		Player	Team	Goals
1	(Armenia)	Arman Minasyan	Impulse	18
2	(Armenia)	Khoren Manucharyan	Pyunik-2	12
3	(Armenia)	Martun Hakobyan	Shengavit	10
4	(Armenia)	Albert Hovakimyan	Pyunik-2	9
	(Armenia)	Vigen Avetisyan	Pyunik-3	9
	(Armenia)	Gagik Poghosyan	Pyunik-3	9
	(Armenia)	Hovhannes Mnatsakanyan	Shengavit	9
5	(Armenia)	Hovhannes Hovhannisyan	Pyunik-3	8
	(Armenia)	Aram Hakobyan	Impulse	8

== See also ==
- 2009 Armenian Premier League
- 2009 Armenian Cup
