= Boti Goa =

Ivorian professional footballer (born 1989)

Personal information
- Full name: Boti Goa Tyrolien Orphée Demel
- Date of birth: March 3, 1989 (age 37)
- Place of birth: Dabou, Ivory Coast
- Height: 6 ft 0 in (1.83 m)
- Position: Forward

Youth career
- Omness Dabou
- 2007–2008: Benfica

Senior career*
Years	Team	Apps	(Gls)
2008–2011	Mika	51	(25)
2011–2012	Rosenborg	2	(0)
2012	Mika	8	(3)
2012–2013	Zestaponi	17	(3)
2013	Shirak	7	(0)
2014	Zhetysu	22	(3)
2015	Guria Lanchkhuti	5	(0)
2016	Zhetysu	5	(0)

International career
- Ivory Coast U-20
- * Club domestic league appearances and goals as of 13 June 2016

Boti Goa Tyrolien Orphée Demel (born March 3, 1989) is an Ivorian professional footballer who last played for Zhetysu in the Kazakhstan Premier League.

== Career ==
Born in Dabou, Goa began his career with Club Omnisport Omness Dabou and joined the top Portuguese club Benfica in summer 2007. He played for one year in Benfica's youth team, scoring 15 goals in 26 matches. In October 2008, he went on trial to Girona FC, but subsequently signed with Armenian side Mika F.C. On 28 February, he was sold to Rosenborg BK.

In January 2012, the Norwegian media reported that Goa was arriving late from vacation for the second time in four months, and wondered if his time in Rosenborg had come to an end. It was later revealed that Goa had been hospitalized after being involved in a car accident in Ivory Coast.

In June 2016, Goa left FC Zhetysu.

== International career ==
Goa is former member of the Ivory Coast national under-20 football team.

== Career statistics ==
=== Club ===
As of match played 16 May 2016

Appearances and goals by club, season and competition
Club	Season	League			National Cup		Continental		Other (Note: Includes other competitive competitions, including the Armenian Supercup, Georgian Super Cup)		Total	
Club	Season	Division	Apps	Goals	Apps	Goals	Apps	Goals	Apps	Goals	Apps	Goals
Mika	2009	Armenian Premier League	24	14	4	0	2	0	-		30	14
Mika	2010	Armenian Premier League	19	8	2	1	2	0	-		23	9
Mika	Total		43	22	6	1	4	0	-	-	53	23
Rosenborg	2011	Tippeligaen	2	0	2	0	–		–		4	0
Mika	2012–13	Armenian Premier League	8	3	2	0	–		–		11	0
Zestaponi	2012–13	Umaglesi Liga	17	3	2	2	–		1	0	20	5
Shirak	2013–14	Armenian Premier League	7	0	2	0	–		1	0	10	0
Zhetysu	2014	Kazakhstan Premier League	22	3	0	0	–		–		22	3
Guria Lanchkhuti	2015–16	Umaglesi Liga	5	0	0	0	–		–		5	0
Zhetysu	2016	Kazakhstan Premier League	5	0	0	0	–		–		5	0
Career total			109	31	14	3	4	0	2	0	129	34
