= Gevorg Ghazaryan =

Armenian footballer (born 1988)

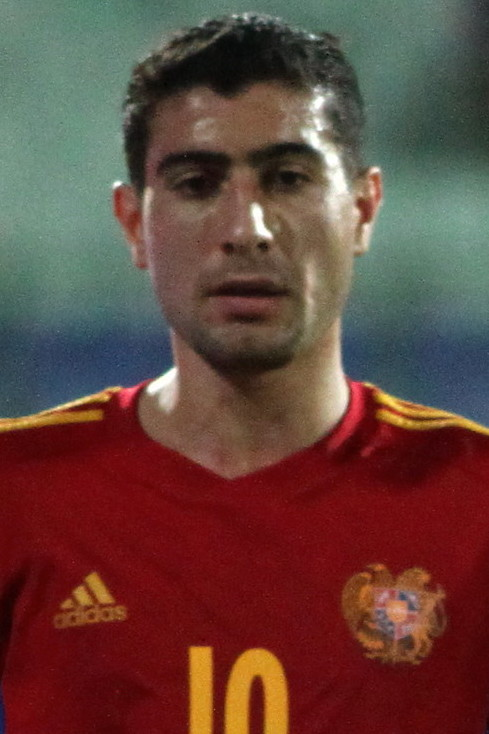
- Ghazaryan with Armenia in 2012

Personal information
- Full name: Gevorg Garnikovich Ghazaryan
- Date of birth: 5 April 1988 (age 38)
- Place of birth: Yerevan, Armenian SSR, Soviet Union
- Height: 1.80 m (5 ft 11 in)
- Positions: Attacking midfielder; forward

Senior career*
Years	Team	Apps	(Gls)
2006–2011	Pyunik	117	(43)
2007	→ Banants Yerevan (loan)	11	(6)
2011–2014	Metalurh Donetsk	59	(6)
2013	→ Shakhter Karagandy (loan)	3	(0)
2014–2015	Olympiacos	7	(0)
2015	Kerkyra	8	(1)
2015–2018	Marítimo	57	(5)
2018–2019	Chaves	19	(3)
2019–2021	AEL Limassol	19	(1)
2021	→ Lamia (loan)	5	(0)
2021–2022	Pyunik	16	(3)
2022–2023	Ararat-Armenia	21	(2)

International career
2005–2006	Armenia U19	6	(1)
2006–2010	Armenia U21	18	(5)
2007–2023	Armenia	75	(14)
- * Club domestic league appearances and goals

Gevorg Ghazaryan (Armenian: Գևորգ Ղազարյան; born 5 April 1988) is an Armenian former professional footballer who played as an attacking midfielder or forward.

Ghazaryan has participated in 73 international matches, scoring 14 goals since his debut on 14 January 2007. He previously played for Greek Super League clubs Olympiacos and Kerkyra, and earlier for Pyunik.

== Club career ==
=== Pyunik ===
In the 2004 Armenian Premier League season, Ghazaryan played for the youth team FC Pyunik, performing in the First League. For the next season, he debuted in the senior first team. On 6 July 2005, Ghazaryan came to the Lernagorts Stadium against the same command, replacing in the half-time interval with Aghvan Mkrtchyan. His first goal for the club happened the following season. On 24 May 2006, in a game against Shirak FC, Ghazaryan entered the field at the 55th minute of the match and, after five minutes, scored his first goal. In the same match, he scored his second goal, having issued such a double (the match ended with the score 7–0).

In 2007, Ghazaryan played in Pyunik for the first round of the Armenian Premier League, then went on loan to Banants for the interests of the Armenian youth team. In the first game, Ghazaryan scored a hat-trick. Having played in the second round for Banants, he then returned to Pyunik. Every year that progresses, they see the potential and improve their skills. In 2010, Ghazaryan reached a new, higher support height of his experience. This season, he accounted two hat-tricks and scored twice in the 2010 Armenia Cup final. While Ghazaryan played for Pyunik, the club won the 2006 Armenian Premier League, 2007 Armenian Premier League, 2008 Armenian Premier League, 2009 Armenian Premier League and 2010 Armenian Premier League, the 2009 Armenian Cup and 2010 Armenian Cup and the 2006 Armenian Supercup, 2007 Armenian Supercup and 2009 Armenian Supercup.

On 10 January 2011, it was reported that Ghazaryan went to the preseason camp with FC Kuban Krasnodar.

=== Metalurh Donetsk ===
In June 2011, Ghazaryan signed a contract with Metalurh Donetsk, along with Pyunik teammate Marcos Pizzelli.

On 19 July 2012, in the Europa League soccer match against FK Čelik Nikšić, Ghazaryan made his first hat-trick for Metalurh and gave one assist, thus the Ukrainian club won 7–0. In January 2014, he was linked with a move to FC Kairat Almaty and he trialled with Eintracht Braunschweig. In December it was reported that Ghazaryan could not reach a deal with Shakhter Karagandy as the club was not ready to pay the previously agreed amount. Eventually, he finished the 2013–14 season with Metalurh Donetsk.

Shakhter Karaganda

In summer 2013, he joined FC Shakhter Karagandy on loan from Metalurh Donetsk. In November he reportedly signed a two-year contract with club. He was among the key players as his club made Europe remember its name after an unexpected victory over Celtic in the qualifying round of Champions League play-off.

=== Olympiacos ===
Ghazaryan continued his career in Super League Greece by signing for an undisclosed fee a two-year contract with Greek champions Olympiacos, while according to reports percentage of a possible resale lies to his agent Mino Raiola. Ghazaryan won the Greek Cup and the Super League. On 30 January 2015, Olympiacos announced the termination of Ghazaryan's contract after half a year at the Piraeus club. It is said that his short stay at the club was ended due to an argument with Spanish coach Míchel, who sacked him from the squad. From Athens, Ghazaryan left for another half-season at Corfu island's PAE Kerkyra.

=== Kerkyra ===
At his new team, Ghazaryan had the coach's trust and enough playing minutes to prove his value. With one goal and several assists, he was key to the team, except for when he got injured. Injuries and personal motives kept him off the field for some time, but his few games at the island and the solid performances for Armenia national team made Portuguese side C.S. Marítimo purchase his services in July 2015.

Marítimo

Ghazaryan spent almost exactly 3 years playing for the Portuguese team. During this time in Liga Portugal, he played in 67 matches, scoring 8 goals and providing 6 assists. He provided goal contributions against notable Portuguese sides S.L. Benfica and Sporting CP, which are the best teams in Portugal and regularly play in European competitions.

Chaves

Ghazaryan's experience playing in Liga Portugal earned him a move to another Portuguese side G.D. Chaves, where he played for a year. He played 20 games, scoring 3 and assisting 2 goals. An important highlight from his short time playing for the team were his goals against Portuguese side S.L. Benfica.

AEL Limassol

Playing in the highest division of Portuguese league, Ghazaryan moved to Cyprus, where he played for AEL Limassol. His stint in Cyprus was not successful, as he played in 24 games and scored only 1 goal.

PAS Lamia

Ghazaryan spent the remaining 6 months of his contract playing for the Greek Super League side PAS Lamia on loan, where he only played 7 games and did not have any goal contributions. His short time at the Greek side consisted of many injuries, not allowing him to get back to his best level.

=== Pyunik return ===
On 14 July 2021, Ghazaryan returned to Pyunik. Ghazaryan left Pyunik on 31 May 2022 after his contract expired.

Ararat-Armenia

The last club of the legend's career was FC Ararat-Armenia, where he played 21 games, and scored 2 goals and provided 2 assists for his last team. Ghazaryan announced his retirement in August 2023.

== International career ==
Ghazaryan started his international career playing for the Armenia national under-19 youth team. In his first official game for the youth team against Cyprus national under-19 football team on 29 October 2006, Ghazaryan played the whole game and helped his team win 1–0. His first goal occurred in the next match on 1 November 2006 against Hungary national under-19 football team, which wasn't enough to help the team as they lost 1–4 to the Hungarian side.

Ghazaryan debuted in the Armenia U21 national team youth team in the qualifying match against San Marino held on 17 May 2006. In the 63rd minute of the match, the 18-year-old Ghazaryan replaced Armen Tigranyan. This junior match is remembered by many. Having originally won 2–1, it turned out that the Armenian team played an ineligible player. This was followed by regular technical defeat; 3–0. But in the second leg, the youth team won 4–0 and advanced to the next round. One of the goals in the 66th minute was scored by Ghazaryan, opening his account for the youth team goals.

In 2007, he was called up to the senior national team. In the same year, on 22 August, Ghazaryan debuted in a match against Portugal. This match was a qualifier for UEFA Euro 2008. The match was held in Yerevan Republican Stadium and ended a sensational draw – 1–1. Moreover, the Portuguese team had to recoup. Ghazaryan came off the bench for 58 minutes, replacing Hamlet Mkhitaryan. Ghazaryan scored five goals at the UEFA Euro 2012 qualifying stage. He was only outscored in Group B by teammate Henrikh Mkhitaryan and was among the top goalscorers in the qualifying stage.

On 11 September 2012, in a 2014 FIFA World Cup qualifier match between the national teams of Armenia and Bulgaria, Ghazaryan was sent off for hitting the ball on a serving ballboy.

== Personal life ==
Ghazaryan and his wife Victoria met in Sevan. Their son was born in December 2012.

Ghazaryan was also a classmate of the wife of Armenian national and Metalurh teammate Karlen Mkrtchyan.

== Career statistics ==
Scores and results list Armenia's goal tally first, score column indicates score after each Ghazaryan goal.

List of international goals scored by Gevorg Ghazaryan
No.	Date	Venue	Opponent	Score	Result	Competition
1	28 March 2009	Hanrapetakan Stadium, Yerevan, Armenia	Estonia	2–2	2–2	2010 FIFA World Cup qualification
2	8 October 2010	Hanrapetakan Stadium, Yerevan, Armenia	Slovakia	2–1	3–1	UEFA Euro 2012 qualification
3	12 October 2010	Hanrapetakan Stadium, Yerevan, Armenia	Andorra	1–0	4–0	UEFA Euro 2012 qualification
4	2 September 2011	Camp d’Esports d’Aixovall, Andorra la Vella, Andorra	Andorra	2–0	3–0	UEFA Euro 2012 qualification
5	6 September 2011	Štadión pod Dubňom, Žilina, Slovakia	Slovakia	3–0	4–0	UEFA Euro 2012 qualification
6	7 October 2011	Hanrapetakan Stadium, Yerevan, Armenia	Macedonia	3–0	4–1	UEFA Euro 2012 qualification
7	5 June 2012	Hanrapetakan Stadium, Yerevan, Armenia	Kazakhstan	1–0	3–0	Friendly
8	5 June 2012	Hanrapetakan Stadium, Yerevan, Armenia	Kazakhstan	2–0	3–0	Friendly
9	6 September 2013	Eden Arena, Prague, Czech Republic	Czech Republic	2–1	2–1	2014 FIFA World Cup qualification
10	11 November 2016	Hanrapetakan Stadium, Yerevan, Armenia	Montenegro	3–2	3–2	2018 FIFA World Cup qualification
11	16 October 2018	Hanrapetakan Stadium, Yerevan, Armenia	Macedonia	3–0	4–0	2018–19 UEFA Nations League D
12	8 June 2019	Hanrapetakan Stadium, Yerevan, Armenia	Liechtenstein	1–0	3–0	UEFA Euro 2020 qualification
13	11 June 2019	Olympic Stadium, Athens, Greece	Greece	2–0	3–2	UEFA Euro 2020 qualification
14	15 November 2020	Boris Paichadze Dinamo Arena, Tbilisi, Georgia	Georgia	1–0	2–1	2020–21 UEFA Nations League C

== Honours ==
Pyunik Yerevan

- Armenian Premier League: 2006, 2007, 2008, 2009, 2010, 2021–22
- Armenian Cup: 2009
- Armenian Supercup: 2007, 2008, 2010

Olympiacos

- Super League Greece: 2014–15
- Greek Football Cup: 2014–15

Individual

- Armenian Premier League Best young player: 2007
- Armenian Premier League top scorer: 2010
- Player of the Month in Metalurh Donetsk: September 2011
