= 2010 Armenian First League =

Football league season

The 2010 Armenian First League season began on 9 April 2010, and ended on 13 November 2010.

== Overview ==
- FC Ararat Yerevan were relegated from the Armenian Premier League, and it was the only club capable of promotion.
- Shengavit represent the reserves of Ulisses FC.

== League table ==
Pos	Team	Pld	W	D	L	GF	GA	GD	Pts	Promotion
1	Ararat Yerevan	24	17	4	3	50	19	+31	55	Promotion to Armenian Premier League
2	Banants-2	24	16	2	6	59	35	+24	50	
3	Pyunik-2	24	16	2	6	52	20	+32	50	
4	Gandzasar-2	24	13	5	6	37	20	+17	44	
5	Shengavit	24	8	7	9	42	41	+1	31	
6	Mika-2	24	7	5	12	28	44	−16	26	
7	Impuls-2	24	5	4	15	22	41	−19	19	
8	Pyunik-3	24	5	3	16	22	53	−31	18	
9	Shirak-2	24	4	2	18	18	57	−39	14	

== See also ==
- 2010 Armenian Premier League
- 2010 Armenian Cup
