= Marcos Pizzelli =

Brazilian-born Armenian footballer

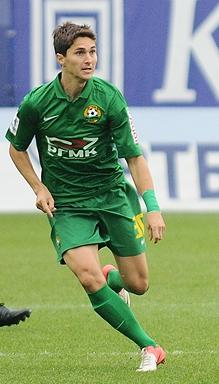
- Marcos with Kuban in 2012

Personal information
- Full name: Marcos Pinheiro Pizzelli
- Date of birth: 3 October 1984 (age 42)
- Place of birth: Piracicaba, Brazil
- Height: 1.75 m (5 ft 9 in)
- Position: Attacking midfielder

Youth career
- 2000–2005: São Carlos

Senior career*
Years	Team	Apps	(Gls)
2006–2008	Ararat Yerevan	78	(44)
2008–2009	→ ASA Issy (loan)		
2009–2011	Pyunik	49	(31)
2011–2012	Metalurh Donetsk	18	(4)
2012–2013	Kuban Krasnodar	31	(8)
2013–2014	Krasnodar	6	(0)
2014	→ Aktobe (loan)	28	(8)
2015–2016	Aktobe	27	(5)
2016	Al-Raed	13	(4)
2016–2017	Al-Fujairah	7	(4)
2017	Xanthi	10	(0)
2017–2018	Al-Shabab	15	(3)
2018–2019	Aktobe	35	(20)
2019–2020	Ararat-Armenia	0	(0)

International career^{‡}
2008–2019	Armenia	68	(11)
- * Club domestic league appearances and goals as of 31 December 2019 ‡ National team caps and goals as of 20:53 23 September 2018 (UTC)

Marcos Pinheiro Pizzelli (pronounced [pitˈtsɛlli]; Armenian: Մարկոս Պինեյրո Պիզզելլի; born 3 October 1984), commonly known as Marcos, is a former professional footballer. Born in Brazil, Marcos represented Armenia internationally between 2008 and 2019.

== Club career ==
=== Ararat Yerevan ===
Pizzelli started his career at the Brazilian club São Carlos as a youth from 2000 to 2005. In 2006, the young talent was spotted by an agent from Ararat Yerevan, who soon recruited Pizzelli. His debut took place on 30 April in a game against Ulisses. Pizzelli entered the field in the 58th minute of the match, replacing Tigran Yesayan. His first goal for Ararat happened on 16 June in another game against Ulisses. For the first season Pizzelli focused on adapting, and the next on scoring goals. With his good performances, Pizzelli was the leading scorer in the Armenian Premier League twice with Ararat, scoring 22 goals during the 2007 Armenian Premier League and scoring 17 goals during that 2008 Armenian Premier League. As a result of the financial problems that befell Ararat, the club decided to loan Pizzelli to the amateur club of the French 5th Division – Ararat (Issy-les-Moulineaux).

=== Pyunik Yerevan ===
Six months later, in the summer of 2009, Pizzelli's contract with Ararat Yerevan ended, and, as a free agent, he accepted offer of FC Yerevan Pyunik. In July, he signed a long-term contract. With Pizzelli playing for Pyunik, the club won the 2009 Armenian Premier League and 2010 Armenian Premier League, won the 2009 Armenian Cup and 2010 Armenian Cup and won the 2010 Armenian Supercup. In the 10th round of the 2010 Armenian Premier League, Marcos had his 100th match in the Premier League in the history of his performance. That season, Pizzelli became the top goalscorer for a third time along with Armenian Gevorg Ghazaryan, with both scoring 16 goals. In the middle of the 2011 Armenian Premier League, Pizzelli scored six goals, but was then transferred to Metalurh Donetsk.

=== Metalurh Donetsk ===
In June 2011, Pizzelli signed a contract with Metalurh Donetsk, along with Pyunik teammate Gevorg Ghazaryan. In his first official match for the Donetsk club, Pizzelli scored a goal, and this goal, scored against Chornomorets Odesa, was the only one in the match. In the higher level championship, Pizzelli had more difficulty playing and found it harder to score than in the Armenian Premier League. However, his trouble scoring was also due to the Metalurh coach not playing as a striker, but instead as an attacking midfielder.

=== Kuban Krasnodar ===
In January 2012, Pizzelli joined Kuban Krasnodar. In 2011, in a match between Russia and Armenia, the head coach of Team Kuban Dan Petrescu spotted Pizzelli and was interested in the player. After a long observation of the game of Pizzelli, Petrescu agreed to acquire the player. On 13 January, they signed a contract for three years. On 18 March, Pizzelli scored the first goal in the Russian Premier League and brought Kuban the win over Rubin Kazan. Pizzelli was voted player of the month for Kuban a second time in May 2012.

=== Krasnodar ===
In May 2013, Pizzelli agreed to join Kuban Krasnodar's rivals FC Krasnodar on a two-year contract starting on 10 June 2013. After six months with Krasnodar, Pizzelli joined Kazakhstan Premier League side Aktobe on a season-long loan in January 2014.

=== Aktobe ===
In October 2014, Pizzelli made his loan move from FC Krasnodar permanent. Following the conclusion of the 2015 season, Pizzelli was transfer listed by Aktobe.

=== Al-Raed ===
On 18 January 2016, Pizzelli moved to Saudi club Al-Raed.

=== Al-Fujairah ===
On 27 June 2016, Pizzelli was transferred to Al-Fujairah of the UAE Arabian Gulf League.

=== Aktobe return ===
On 13 February 2018, FC Aktobe announced the return of Pizzelli to the team. He was awarded the Kazakh Premier League top goal scorer after scoring 18 goals in 24 games.

=== Ararat-Armenia ===
On 31 December 2019, FC Ararat-Armenia announced the signing of Pizzelli, however on 11 January, Ararat-Armenia and Pizzelli announced that he was retiring from football due to injury.

== International career ==
In May 2008, Pizzelli received Armenian citizenship and became a member of the Armenia national team. He made his first appearance on 28 May 2008 and scored on his debut in a friendly away game against Moldova. The match ended with the score 2–2. After playing three games that year, he was briefly no longer invited to the national team. After moving to Yerevan to play for Pyunik, he again came to the attention of coaches and 12 August 2009 Marcos again played for the Armenia national team regularly. On 8 October 2010, in a match against Slovakia, he made a scoring pass to Yura Movsisyan, and a few days later, he scored Armenia's fourth goal in a game against Andorra. That victory then went on to secure Armenia's by that time highest ever FIFA World Ranking as 42nd. For his second goal for the national squad, Pizzelli scored in an away match with Russia (3–1 loss). His third goal for the team scored in am away match against Andorra in which Armenia won 3–0. His fourth goal for the national team scored in the match against Macedonia, in which Armenia won 4–1. In a friendly game, which was held 29 February 2012 against Canada, marked the first time in his double gate rivals. On 11 September 2012, Pizzelli was controversially sent off in a 2014 World Cup qualifier against Bulgaria.

On 11 October 2014, Pizzelli had a penalty saved by Serbia goalkeeper Vladimir Stojković in a UEFA Euro 2016 qualifying match, after which Zoran Tošić scored a late equaliser to give Serbia a 1–1 draw.

== Personal life ==
Pizzelli is married to his wife Natalia. They met in Brazil and she moved with him to Armenia. He and Natalia do not have children. Pizzelli speaks Portuguese, Armenian, English and was learning Russian. He identifies as Brazilian-Armenian. Pizzelli says he feels more Armenian than Brazilian. He said he would never forget about Armenia, which gave him an opportunity to develop his skills. "I am grateful to this country for everything. I would play for Armenia as long as the squad needs me."

== Career statistics ==
=== Club ===
As of match played 3 November 2019

Appearances and goals by club, season and competition
Club	Season	League			National cup		Continental		Other		Total	
Club	Season	Division	Apps	Goals	Apps	Goals	Apps	Goals	Apps	Goals	Apps	Goals
Ararat Yerevan	2006	Armenian Premier League	24	5			–		–		24	5
Ararat Yerevan	2007	Armenian Premier League	26	22			–		–		26	22
Ararat Yerevan	2008	Armenian Premier League	28	17			2	0	–		30	17
Ararat Yerevan	Total		78	44			2	0	–		80	44
ASA Issy (loan)	2008–09	CFA 2					–		–			
Pyunik	2009	Armenian Premier League	12	9			2	0	–		14	9
Pyunik	2010	Armenian Premier League	26	16	4	3	2	0	–		32	19
Pyunik	2011	Armenian Premier League	11	6	0	0	–		–		28	16
Pyunik	Total		49	31	4	3	4	0	–		57	34
Metalurh Donetsk	2011–12	Ukrainian Premier League	18	4	1	0	–		–		19	4
Kuban Krasnodar	2011–12	Russian Premier League	10	3	0	0	–		–		10	3
Kuban Krasnodar	2012–13	Russian Premier League	21	5	2	1	–		–		23	6
Kuban Krasnodar	Total		31	8	2	1	–		–		33	9
Krasnodar	2013–14	Russian Premier League	6	0	2	2	–		–		8	2
Aktobe (loan)	2014	Kazakhstan Premier League	28	8	5	2	5	0	1	0	39	10
Aktobe	2015	Kazakhstan Premier League	27	5	3	1	2	0	–		32	6
Al-Raed	2015–16	Saudi Professional League	13	4	2	0	–		2	1	17	5
Al-Fujairah	2016–17	UAE First Division League	7	4			–		–		7	4
Xanthi	2016–17	Super League Greece	10	0	3	0	–		–		13	0
Al-Shabab	2017–18	Saudi Professional League	15	3	1	1	–		–		16	4
Aktobe	2018	Kazakhstan Premier League	24	18	1	0	–		–		25	18
Aktobe	2019	Kazakhstan Premier League	11	2	0	0	–		–		11	2
Aktobe	Total		35	20	1	0	–		–		36	20
Career total			317	131	24	10	13	0	2	1	356	142

=== International ===
As of match played on 9 September 2018

Appearances and goals by national team and year
National team	Year	Apps	Goals
Armenia	2008	2	1
Armenia	2009	3	0
Armenia	2010	5	1
Armenia	2011	8	3
Armenia	2012	7	2
Armenia	2013	9	0
Armenia	2014	6	0
Armenia	2015	6	1
Armenia	2016	7	1
Armenia	2017	7	0
Armenia	2018	5	2
Total		65	11

As of match played on 16 October 2018
Scores and results list Armenia's goal tally first, score column indicates score after each Pizzelli goal.

List of international goals scored by Marcos Pizzelli
No.	Date	Venue	Cap	Opponent	Score	Result	Competition	Ref.
1	28 May 2008	Sheriff Stadium, Tiraspol, Moldova	1	Moldova	1–0	2–2	Friendly	
2	15 October 2010	Vazgen Sargsyan Republican Stadium, Yerevan, Armenia	10	Andorra	4–0	4–0	UEFA Euro 2012 qualification	
3	4 April 2011	Petrovsky Stadium, Saint Petersburg, Russia	13	Russia	1–0	1–3	UEFA Euro 2012 qualification	
4	2 September 2011	Camp d’Esports d’Aixovall, Aixovall, Andorra	15	Andorra	1–0	3–0	UEFA Euro 2012 qualification	
5	7 October 2011	Vazgen Sargsyan Republican Stadium, Yerevan, Armenia	17	Macedonia	1–0	4–1	UEFA Euro 2012 qualification	
6	29 February 2012	Tsirion Stadium, Limassol, Cyprus	19	Canada	1–1	3–1	Friendly	
7	29 February 2012	Tsirion Stadium, Limassol, Cyprus	19	Canada	1–1	2–1	Friendly	
8	13 June 2015	Vazgen Sargsyan Republican Stadium, Yerevan, Armenia	42	Portugal	1–0	2–3	UEFA Euro 2016 qualification	
9	11 October 2016	National Stadium, Warsaw, Poland	53	Poland	1–1	1–2	2018 FIFA World Cup qualification	
10	6 September 2018	Vazgen Sargsyan Republican Stadium, Yerevan, Armenia	62	Liechtenstein	1–0	2–1	2018–19 UEFA Nations League D	
11	16 October 2018	Vazgen Sargsyan Republican Stadium, Yerevan, Armenia	65	North Macedonia	1–0	4–0	2018–19 UEFA Nations League D	

== Honours ==
Ararat Yerevan

- Armenian Cup: 2008

Pyunik Yerevan

- Armenian Premier League: 2009, 2010
- Armenian Cup: 2009, 2010

Aktobe

- Kazakhstan Super Cup: 2014

Individual

- Armenian Premier League top scorer: 2007 (22), 2008 (17), 2010 (16)
- Armenian Footballer of the Year: 2018
- Kazakhstan Premier League Top Scorer: 2018
