= 2009 Armenian Cup =

Tournament details
- Country: Armenia
- Teams: 8

Final positions
- Champions: Pyunik
- Runners-up: Banants

Tournament statistics
- Matches played: 13
- Goals scored: 34 (2.62 per match)

The 2009 Armenian Cup was the 18th season of Armenian knockout football competition. It featured only 8 Premier League teams. The tournament started on 17 March 2009 and ended on 9 May 2009. The defending champions were Ararat Yerevan.

== Results ==
=== Quarter-finals ===
The first legs were played on 17 and 18 March 2009. The second legs were played on 7 and 8 April 2009.

Team 1	Agg.	Team 2	1st leg	2nd leg
Ulisses	4–2	Gandzasar	4–1	0–1
Pyunik	6–0	Kilikia	3–0	3–0
Mika	3–2	Shirak	3–1	0–1
Banants	3–0	Ararat Yerevan	2–0	1–0

=== Semi-finals ===
The first legs were played on 14 and 15 April 2009. The second legs were played on 21 and 22 April 2009.

Team 1	Agg.	Team 2	1st leg	2nd leg
Ulisses	1–4	Pyunik	1–3	0–1
Mika	3–5	Banants	1–1	2–4

=== Final ===
9 May 2009
20:00 (WAST)

Banants	0 – 1	Pyunik
		Mkhitaryan 90+2'

Vazgen Sargsyan Republican Stadium, Yerevan
Attendance: 7,500
Referee: Paolo Dondarini (San Giovanni in Persiceto)

FC BANANTS:
GK	22	(Armenia) Stepan Ghazaryan
DF	20	(Armenia) Hovhannes Grigoryan	(yellow card) 51'	(substituted off) 70'
DF	8	(Armenia) Arthur Voskanyan (c)
DF	2	(Ukraine) Yarema Kavatsiv
MF	15	(Armenia) Eduard Kakosyan
MF	13	(Uganda) Noah Kasule	(yellow card) 35' (yellow-red card) 83'
MF	17	(Armenia) Sargis Karapetyan
MF	9	(Armenia) Artak Dashyan
MF	11	(Armenia) Arsen Balabekyan		(substituted off) 82'
FW	6	(Armenia) Hrant Gevorgyan		(substituted off) 50'
FW	21	(Armenia) Samvel Melkonyan		(substituted off) 74'
Substitutes:
GK	1	(Ukraine) Oleh Ostapenko
DF	5	(Armenia) Zhora Stepanyan
DF	7	(Armenia) Aram Bareghamyan
DF	10	(Armenia) Artak Oseyan		(substituted on) 82'
DF	12	(Armenia) Grisha Khachatryan		(substituted on) 70'
FW	14	(Armenia) Sargis Nasibyan		(substituted on) 74'
FW	18	(Armenia) Norayr Gyozalyan		(substituted on) 50'
Manager:
(Armenia) Armen Gyulbudaghyants

PYUNIK FC:
GK	1	(Armenia) Grigor Meliksetyan
DF	4	(Armenia) Sargis Hovsepyan (c)
DF	3	(Armenia) Karen Khachatryan
DF	16	(Armenia) Vahagn Minasyan
DF	23	(Zambia) Emmanuel Mbola
MF	15	(Armenia) Arthur Yuspashyan	(yellow card) 90'
MF	5	(Armenia) Arthur Yedigaryan
MF	77	(Armenia) Norayr Sahakyan		(substituted off) 60'
MF	9	(Armenia) Edgar Malakyan	(yellow card) 35' (yellow-red card) 65'
FW	22	(Armenia) Henrik Mkhitaryan
FW	10	(Armenia) Gevorg Ghazaryan
Substitutes:
GK	99	(Armenia) Edvard Hovhannisyan
DF	24	(Armenia) Artak Andrikyan
MF	17	(Armenia) Artak Yedigaryan
MF	6	(Armenia) Karlen Mkrtchyan
MF	11	(Armenia) David Manoyan
MF	91	(Armenia) Artak Aleksanyan
FW	14	(Armenia) Mihran Manasyan		(substituted on) 60'
Manager:
(Armenia) Vardan Minasyan

MATCH RULES

- 90 minutes.
- 30 minutes of extra-time if necessary.
- Penalty shootout if scores still level.
- Seven named substitutes
- Maximum of 3 substitutions.

== See also ==
- 2009 Armenian Premier League
- 2009 Armenian First League
