= 2007 Armenian Premier League =

Armenian Premier League
- Season: 2007
- Dates: 14 April – 10 November 2007
- Champions: Pyunik
- Champions League: Pyunik
- UEFA Cup: Banants; Ararat Yerevan
- UEFA Intertoto Cup: Mika
- Matches: 112
- Goals: 298 (2.66 per match)
- Top goalscorer: Marcos Pizzelli (22)
- Biggest home win: Mika 7-0 Ulisses (13 May 2007)
- Biggest away win: Ararat Yerevan 0-6 Pyunik (26 August 2007); Ararat Yerevan 0-6 Banants (1 September 2007); Kilikia 0-6 Banants (10 November 2007)
- Highest scoring: Ararat Yerevan 5-4 Gandzasar Kapan (29 September 2007)
- All statistics correct as of 21 March 2023.

The 2007 Armenian Premier League season is the sixteenth since its establishment, and started on 14 April 2007. The last matches were played on 10 November 2007. FC Pyunik were the defending champions.

== Participating teams ==
Location of teams in the 2007 Armenian Premier League
- Lernayin Artsakh are promoted.
- FC Mika are relocated from Ashtarak to Yerevan.

Club	City	Stadium	Capacity
Ararat Yerevan	Yerevan	Hrazdan Stadium	55,000
Banants	Yerevan	Banants Stadium	3,600
Gandzasar	Kapan	Gandzasar Stadium	3,500
Kilikia	Yerevan	Hrazdan Stadium	55,000
Lernayin Artsakh	Yerevan	Republican Stadium	14,968
Mika	Yerevan	Mika Stadium	7,250
Pyunik	Yerevan	Republican Stadium	14,968
Shirak	Gyumri	Gyumri City Stadium	2,844
Ulisses	Yerevan	Republican Stadium	14,968

== League table ==
Pos	Team	Pld	W	D	L	GF	GA	GD	Pts	Qualification
1	Pyunik (C)	28	18	3	7	58	22	+36	57	Qualification for the Champions League first qualifying round
2	Banants	28	16	4	8	56	26	+30	52	Qualification for the UEFA Cup first qualifying round
3	Mika	28	14	8	6	42	24	+18	50	Qualification for the Intertoto Cup first round
4	Ararat Yerevan	28	15	4	9	49	42	+7	49	Qualification for the UEFA Cup first qualifying round (Note: Winners of 2008 Armenian Cup.)
5	Gandzasar	28	11	6	11	35	31	+4	39	
6	Shirak	28	9	7	12	27	37	−10	34	
7	Ulisses	28	8	6	14	21	46	−25	30	
8	Kilikia	28	1	2	25	10	70	−60	5	
9	Lernayin Artsakh (W)	0	0	0	0	0	0	0	0	Withdrew (Note: Lernayin Artsakh withdrew before start of the season.)

Rules for classification: 1) points; 2) goal difference; 3) number of goals scored.
(C) Champions; (W) Withdrew

== Results ==
=== First half of season ===
Home \ Away	ARA	BAN	GAN	KIL	MIK	PYU	SHI	ULI
Ararat Yerevan		2–1	1–0	5–0	2–0	0–0	1–0	2–0
Banants	1–0		2–3	3–0	1–1	1–2	3–0	2–0
Gandzasar	1–0	0–1		2–0	0–2	0–1	0–0	0–0
Kilikia	0–4	0–3	0–0		1–2	0–5	1–4	0–0
Mika	2–2	1–1	3–2	2–1		1–2	3–1	7–0
Pyunik	3–4	5–1	1–0	2–0	1–0		1–2	5–0
Shirak	0–1	0–0	0–0	0–1	1–0	1–5		3–1
Ulisses	0–3	2–3	0–2	2–0	0–1	1–2	0–2	

Legend: Blue = home team win; Yellow = draw; Red = away team win.

=== Second half of season ===
Home \ Away	ARA	BAN	GAN	KIL	MIK	PYU	SHI	ULI
Ararat Yerevan		0–6	5–4	2–1	1–2	0–6	4–0	0–0
Banants	2–0		3–0	2–0	0–1	2–1	2–0	1–2
Gandzasar	2–1	3–2		4–0	1–1	0–0	4–2	1–2
Kilikia	1–3	0–6	0–2		0–2	0–2	1–3	1–2
Mika	4–1	0–2	1–0	3–1		1–0	1–1	1–1
Pyunik	4–1	0–3	1–2	2–0	1–0		0–0	3–0
Shirak	0–2	1–1	2–1	2–1	0–0	2–0		0–1
Ulisses	2–2	2–1	0–1	1–0	0–0	0–3	2–0	

Legend: Blue = home team win; Yellow = draw; Red = away team win.

== Season statistics ==
=== Top scorers ===
As of match played 9 November 2006

Rank	Player	Club	Goals
1	(Brazil) Marcos Pizzelli	Ararat Yerevan	22
2	(Armenia) Arsen Balabekyan	Banants	15
3	(Armenia) Henrik Mkhitaryan	Pyunik	12
3	(Armenia) Gevorg Ghazaryan	Banants	12
5	(Armenia) Levon Pachajyan	Pyunik	10
5	(Armenia) Samvel Melkonyan	Banants	10
7	(Brazil) Alex	Mika	8
7	(Armenia) Artur Kocharyan	Gandzasar Kapan	8
9	(Armenia) Artyom Bernetsyan	Shirak	7
9	(Armenia) Nshan Erzrumyan	Ararat Yerevan	7

== Attendances ==
#	Club	Average
1	Gandzasar	1,500
2	Banants	678
3	Shirak	625
4	Ararat	571
5	Pyunik	508
6	Ulisses	299
7	Mika	288
8	Kilikia	118

== See also ==
- 2007 Armenian First League
- 2007 Armenian Cup
