= Artur Kocharyan =

Soviet association football player

Personal information
- Date of birth: 14 September 1974 (age 52)
- Place of birth: Yerevan, Armenian SSR, Soviet Union
- Height: 1.68 m (5 ft 6 in)
- Position: Forward

Senior career*
Years	Team	Apps	(Gls)
1990–1992	FC Malatia	66	(30)
1993–1997	Ararat Yerevan	87	(37)
1999	Zvartnots-AAL	28	(11)
1999–2000	Ialysos	8	(2)
2000	Mika	8	(2)
2001	Pyunik	19	(5)
2002	Spartak Yerevan	21	(3)
2003	Kotayk	12	(7)
2003–2004	Homenetmen Beirut	22	(15)
2004–2006	Hekmeh FC	?	(?)
2006–2007	Gandzasar Kapan	48	(23)
2008–2009	Ulisses	48	(18)
2010–2011	Gandzasar Kapan	46	(11)
2012	Ulisses	0	(0)

International career
1994–1995	Armenia U-21	10	(4)
1996–1999	Armenia	4	(0)
- * Club domestic league appearances and goals

Artur Kocharyan (Armenian: Արթուր Քոչարյան; born 14 September 1974) is an Armenian former professional footballer who played as a striker. With Ulisses, Kocharyan won the top goalscorer title during the 2009 Armenian Premier League season. He is one of the Armenian Premier League top scorers of all times.

== National team ==
In 1994–95, Kocharyan represented the Armenia U-21 national team, scoring 4 goals in 10 appearances.

Between 1996 and 1999, he was a member of the Armenia national football team. His international debut was on 17 January 1996, in a friendly against Morocco in France. He appeared with the national team in 4 occasions.
