= 2010 Armenian Premier League =

Armenian Premier League
- Season: 2010
- Champions: Pyunik; 13th title
- Relegated: none
- Champions League: Pyunik
- Europa League: Mika; Banants; Ulisses
- Matches: 112
- Goals: 316 (2.82 per match)
- Top goalscorer: Gevorg Ghazaryan and Marcos Pizzelli (16 goals)
- Biggest home win: Mika 6–1 Shirak (12 June); Banants 6-1 Impuls (6 August)
- Biggest away win: Gandzasar 1–6 Pyunik (1 May)
- Highest scoring: Banants 5–2 Impuls (3 April); Gandzasar 1–6 Pyunik (1 May); Mika 6-1 Shirak (12 June); Banants 6-1 Impuls (6 August)
- Longest winning run: Banants (11 games) (1 May–6 August)
- Longest unbeaten run: 15 games by 2 teams Pyunik (3 July–14 November); Banants (3 April–6 August)
- Longest winless run: Shirak (13 games) (5 June–27 September)
- Longest losing run: 9 games by 2 teams Kilikia (11 September–14 November); Shirak (5 June–21 August)

The 2010 Armenian Premier League season was the nineteenth since its establishment. The season began in March 2010 and ended in November 2010. FC Pyunik were the defending champions, having won their twelfth championship last season.

== Participating teams ==
Ararat Yerevan finished in last place last season and were relegated to the Armenian First League. Taking their place this year is Impuls FC Dilijan, who finished first in the 2009 Armenian First League.

Location of teams in the 2010 Armenian Premier League

Club	Location	Stadium	Capacity
Banants	Yerevan	Republican Stadium	14,403
Gandzasar	Kapan	Gandzasar Stadium	3,500
Impuls	Dilijan	Dilijan City Stadium	2,200
Kilikia	Yerevan	Hrazdan Stadium	54,208
Mika	Yerevan	Mika Stadium	7,250
Pyunik	Yerevan	Republican Stadium	14,403
Shirak	Gyumri	Gyumri City Stadium	2,844
Ulisses	Yerevan	Hrazdan Stadium	54,208

== League table ==
Pos	Team	Pld	W	D	L	GF	GA	GD	Pts	Qualification
1	Pyunik (C)	28	20	5	3	73	22	+51	65	Qualification for the Champions League second qualifying round
2	Banants	28	20	4	4	58	24	+34	64	Qualification for the Europa League first qualifying round
3	Ulisses	28	17	4	7	44	23	+21	55	Qualification for the Europa League first qualifying round
4	Mika	28	14	4	10	47	31	+16	46	Qualification for the Europa League second qualifying round (Note: Winners of 2011 Armenian Cup.)
5	Impulse	28	10	7	11	29	43	−14	37	
6	Gandzasar Kapan	28	8	3	17	24	45	−21	27	
7	Kilikia	28	4	3	21	19	60	−41	15	Team disbanded after the season (Note: Kilikia decided not to participate in 2011 Armenian Premier League competition, citing financial difficulties as a reason.)
8	Shirak (Note: Executive committee of the Football Federation of Armenia decided to allow Shirak to participate in the Premier League next season despite the fact that FC Shirak took the last place in the tournament and was supposed to leave it.)	28	2	4	22	22	68	−46	10	

Rules for classification: 1) points; 2) goal difference; 3) number of goals scored.
(C) Champions

== Results ==
The league was played in four stages. The teams have played four times with each other, twice at home and twice away, for a total of 28 matches per team.

=== First half of season ===
Home \ Away	BAN	GAN	IMP	KIL	MIK	PYU	SHI	ULI
Banants		3–0	5–2	2–0	2–0	1–1	5–1	2–0
Gandzasar Kapan	1–2		1–2	3–0	1–1	1–6	1–0	0–1
Impulse	0–1	1–0		0–3 (Note: This match was originally a 2–3 win for Kilikia, but was later awarded to Kilikia 0–3 because Impuls fielded an ineligible player.)	2–2	0–0	2–1	0–3
Kilikia	0–3	3–1	0–1		1–1	0–3	3–1	1–3
Mika	4–0	2–0	1–0	2–0		0–2	6–1	0–1
Pyunik	2–3	0–1	3–0	4–2	4–2		4–1	1–0
Shirak	0–3	0–1	0–1	4–1	0–1	0–3		0–2
Ulisses	2–2	1–0	2–0	2–0	0–0	3–1	4–0	

Source: ffa.am
Legend: Blue = home team win; Yellow = draw; Red = away team win.

=== Second half of season ===
Home \ Away	BAN	GAN	IMP	KIL	MIK	PYU	SHI	ULI
Banants		5–0	6–1	1–0	2–1	2–2	1–1	0–2
Gandzasar Kapan	0–1		1–0	3–0 (Note: The match was awarded as won 3–0 for Gandzasar because Kilikia did not show up for the match.)	0–1	0–3	3–3	0–3
Impulse	0–1	1–1		2–0	2–1	1–1	2–2	2–1
Kilikia	1–2	0–2	0–0		1–4	0–1	2–1	0–3
Mika	0–1	1–0	2–0	4–1		1–3	5–1	2–3
Pyunik	1–0	3–0	3–3	5–0	2–0		5–0	5–1
Shirak	1–2	0–2	1–2	2–0	0–1	0–4		0–1
Ulisses	1–0	2–1	1–2	0–0	1–2	0–1	1–1	

Source: ffa.am
Legend: Blue = home team win; Yellow = draw; Red = away team win.

== Top goalscorers ==
Including matches played on November 14, 2010; Source: ffa.am

Rank	Scorer	Team	Goals
1	(Armenia) Gevorg Ghazaryan	Pyunik	16
1	(Armenia) Marcos Pizzelli	Pyunik	16
3	(Brazil) Eduardo Du Bala	Banants	11
4	(Brazil) Ednei	Mika	10
5	(Armenia) Samvel Melkonyan	Banants	9
5	(Armenia) Mkrtich Nalbandyan	Shirak	9
7	(Ivory Coast) Boti Goa	Mika	8
7	(Armenia) Artur Kocharyan	Gandzasar	8
9	(Nigeria) Ortega Deniran	Banants	7
9	(Armenia) Hovhannes Goharyan	Pyunik	7

== Attendances ==
#	Club	Average
1	Pyunik	1,196
2	Mika	889
3	Gandzasar	727
4	Banants	639
5	Impuls	375
6	Shirak	309
7	Ulisses	284
8	Kilikia	181

== See also ==
- 2010 Armenian First League
- 2010 Armenian Cup
