= Samvel Melkonyan =

Armenian football player (born 1984)

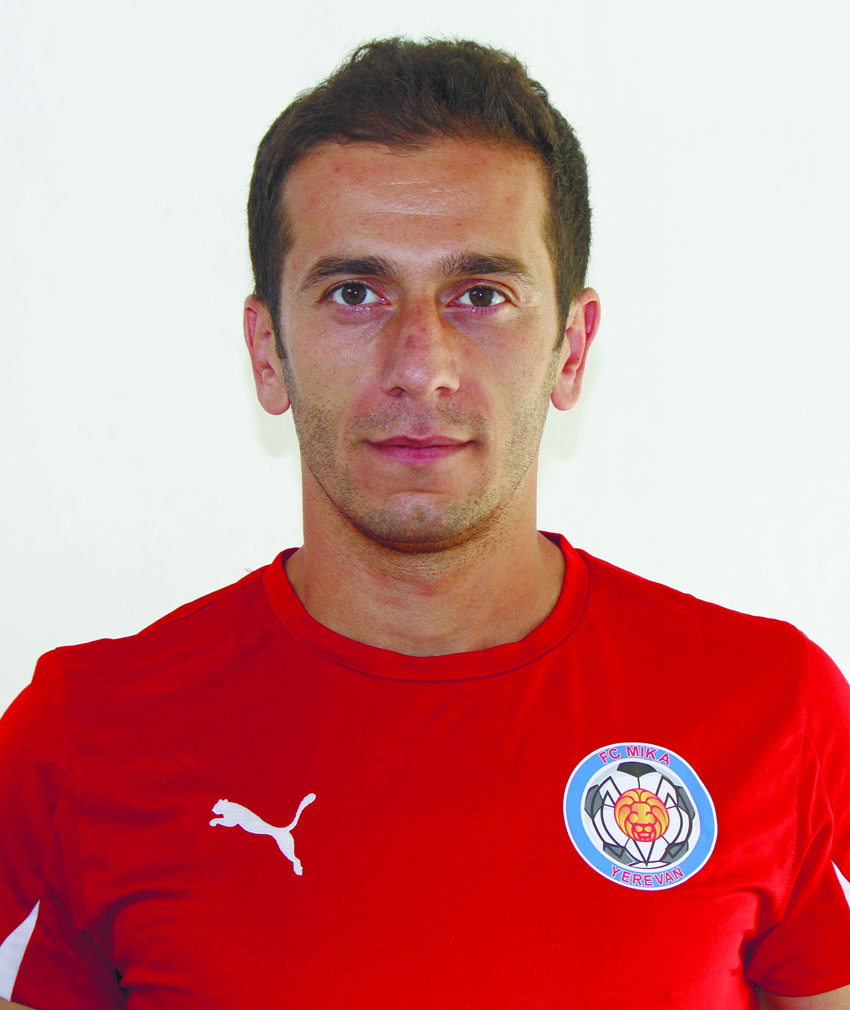

Personal information
- Date of birth: 15 March 1984 (age 42)
- Place of birth: Yerevan, Armenian SSR, Soviet Union
- Height: 1.83 m (6 ft 0 in)
- Positions: Right winger; forward

Team information
- Current team: Alashkert
- Number: 6

Senior career*
Years	Team	Apps	(Gls)
2002–2008	Banants Yerevan	112	(35)
2008–2009	Metalurh Donetsk	16	(0)
2009–2011	Banants	53	(21)
2011–2012	Mika	12	(0)
2012–2012	Chernomorets Burgas	10	(0)
2012–2013	Ulisses	11	(1)
2013–2015	Gandzasar	54	(7)
2015–2016	Mika	16	(5)
2016–2017	Alashkert	4	(0)

International career^{‡}
2003–2006	Armenia U-21	15	(0)
2005–2010	Armenia	29	(0)
- * Club domestic league appearances and goals as of 1 September 2016 ‡ National team caps and goals as of 23 June 2013

Samvel Melkonyan (Armenian: Սամվել Մելքոնյան, born on 15 March 1984 in Yerevan, Armenian SSR, Soviet Union) is an Armenian former footballer who played as a winger. Samvel was also a member of the Armenia national football team, participated in 29 international matches since his debut at home in the 2006 World Cup qualification match against the Netherlands on 3 September 2005.

== Club career ==
Samvel began his professional career playing for Spartak Yerevan. When Spartak merged with Banants, Samvel Melkonyan automatically transferred to Banants. He has been one of the stars at his new club for the past few years. Melkonyan transferred to Ukrainian club Metalurh Donetsk in 2008, but his spell there was not successful and he returned to Banants the following year.

Melkonyan transferred to Chernomorets Burgas in Bulgaria in January 2012. He made his first appearance on 4 March 2012 and had one assist in a 2–0 win for the team against CSKA Sofia.

== Achievements ==
Alashkert

- Armenian Premier League: 2016–17

Banants Yerevan

- Armenian Cup: 2007
