= 2008 Armenian Premier League =

Armenian Premier League
- Season: 2008
- Champions: Pyunik; 11th Armenian title
- Relegated: none
- Champions League: Pyunik
- Europa League: Gandzasar; Mika; Banants
- Matches: 112
- Goals: 254 (2.27 per match)
- Top goalscorer: Marcos Pizzelli (17 goals)
- Biggest home win: Ararat 5–0 Kilikia
- Biggest away win: Kilikia 1–5 Ararat; Kilikia 1–5 Mika
- Highest scoring: Banants 4–2 Kilikia; Kilikia 1–5 Ararat; Kilikia 1–5 Mika

The 2008 Armenian Premier League season (known as STAR National Football League due to sponsorship reasons) was the seventeenth since its establishment. It started on 6 April 2008, while the last matches were played on 15 November 2008. FC Pyunik were the defending champions. The Yerevan side won their seventh consecutive league title the previous season, their tenth overall. FC Dinamo Yerevan were regarded as the team to get promoted, but they withdrew from the Premier League, and were disbanded.

On 30 April 2008, Football Federation of Armenia signed a contract with STAR retailing company to become the sponsor of the 17th Armenian Premier League season, the STAR National Football League.

The league was played in four stages. The teams played each other four times, twice at home and twice away. The champions was the team with the most points after round 28. However, but Pyunik and Ararat Yerevan were tied on points at the end of the season, so they had to play tie breaker game for the championship.

== Participating teams ==
Location of teams in the 2008 Armenian Premier League

Club	Location	Stadium	Capacity
Ararat Yerevan	Yerevan	City Stadium (Abovyan)	3,946
Banants	Yerevan	Banants Stadium	3,600
Gandzasar	Kapan	Gandzasar Stadium	3,500
Kilikia	Yerevan	Hrazdan Stadium	54,208
Mika	Yerevan	Mika Stadium	7,250
Pyunik	Yerevan	Republican Stadium	14,403
Shirak	Gyumri	Gyumri City Stadium	2,844
Ulisses	Yerevan	Kasakhi Marzik Stadium	3,500

== League table ==
Pos	Team	Pld	W	D	L	GF	GA	GD	Pts	Qualification
1	Pyunik (C)	28	18	5	5	40	18	+22	59 (Note: Championship was decided by a decision game (see below).)	Qualification for the Champions League second qualifying round
2	Ararat Yerevan	28	18	5	5	48	23	+25	59	
3	Gandzasar Kapan	28	13	8	7	39	27	+12	47	Qualification for the Europa League second qualifying round (Note: Ararat Yerevan did not obtain the license to compete in European competitions. Therefore, fourth-placed Mika earned a spot in the first qualifying round of the UEFA Europa League while Gandzasar were qualified for the second instead of first qualifying round of the UEFA Europa League.)
4	Mika	28	13	7	8	38	28	+10	46	Qualification for the Europa League first qualifying round
5	Banants	28	11	8	9	34	25	+9	41	Qualification for the Europa League first qualifying round
6	Ulisses	28	7	8	13	19	29	−10	29	
7	Shirak	28	5	4	19	15	40	−25	19	
8	Kilikia	28	2	5	21	21	64	−43	11	

Source: ffa.am
Rules for classification: 1) points; 2) goal difference; 3) number of goals scored.
(C) Champions

=== Decision game ===
Because Ararat and Pyunik were tied on points after the regular season, they played out the championship in a decision game.

19 November 2008
18:00 GMT+4

Pyunik	2–1 (a.e.t.)	Ararat Yerevan
Tadevosyan 68', 118'	Report (in Armenian)	V. Minasyan 69'

Vazgen Sargsyan Republican Stadium, Yerevan
Attendance: 5,000
Referee: Ararat Chagharyan

== Results ==
=== First half of season ===
Home \ Away	ARA	BAN	GAN	KIL	MIK	PYU	SHI	ULI
Ararat Yerevan		1–0	0–1	5–0	2–1	0–0	2–1	3–1
Banants	3–0		1–1	4–2	0–1	0–1	2–0	1–0
Gandzasar Kapan	2–3	0–0		3–1	1–3	1–0	2–0	4–1
Kilikia	0–1	1–1	1–2		0–3	0–3	2–1	0–3
Mika	1–1	1–3	2–1	1–0		1–1	3–1	1–0
Pyunik	1–0	2–0	1–1	2–0	1–1		0–2	1–0
Shirak	0–2	0–2	2–1	0–2	0–0	0–1		0–0
Ulisses	0–2	0–1	1–0	3–0	0–2	1–0	0–1	

Source: ffa.am
Legend: Blue = home team win; Yellow = draw; Red = away team win.

=== Second half of season ===
Home \ Away	ARA	BAN	GAN	KIL	MIK	PYU	SHI	ULI
Ararat Yerevan		1–0	2–0	2–2	4–1	0–1	2–1	2–0
Banants	2–2		0–0	4–1	2–1	1–4	3–0	1–1
Gandzasar Kapan	0–0	1–0		2–2	1–0	3–0	3–0	0–0
Kilikia	1–5	0–1	1–2		1–5	0–1	0–1	1–1
Mika	3–1	1–1	1–1	3–1		0–1	1–0	0–0
Pyunik	0–1	1–0	4–1	3–1	3–0		2–1	3–1
Shirak	1–2	1–1	0–3	1–0	0–1	1–2		0–0
Ulisses	0–2	1–0	1–2	1–1	1–0	1–1	1–0	

Source: ffa.am
Legend: Blue = home team win; Yellow = draw; Red = away team win.

== Top goalscorers ==
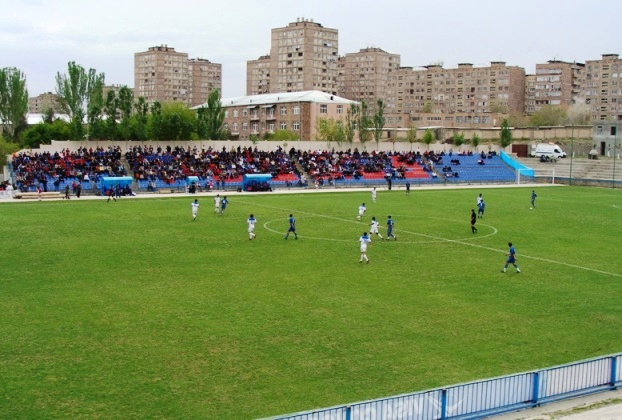
Banants vs Pyunik (0-1), matchday 4 fixture (19 April 2008), at Banants Stadium

Source: ffa.am

Rank	Scorer	Team	Goals
1	(Armenia) Marcos Pizzelli	Ararat Yerevan	17
2	(Armenia) Albert Tadevosyan	Pyunik	10
3	(Armenia) Alexander Petrosyan	Gandzasar	9
4	(Armenia) Narek Beglaryan	Mika	8
4	(Armenia) Gevorg Ghazaryan	Pyunik	8
4	(Armenia) Karen N. Khachatryan	Kilikia	8
7	(Armenia) Arsen Balabekyan	Banants	7
7	(Brazil) Renato de Moraes	Ararat Yerevan	7
9	(Belarus) Vital Lyadzyanyow	Banants	
9	(Armenia) Henrikh Mkhitaryan	Pyunik	

== Attendances ==
#	Club	Average
1	Gandzasar	1,468
2	Mika	539
3	Pyunik	454
4	Banants	410
5	Shirak	295
6	Ararat	265
7	Ulisses	168
8	Kilikia	131

== See also ==
- 2008 Armenian First League
- 2008 Armenian Cup
