= Kapan Stadium =

Football stadium in Kapan, Armenia

Coordinates: 39.2077871°N 46.4006737°E

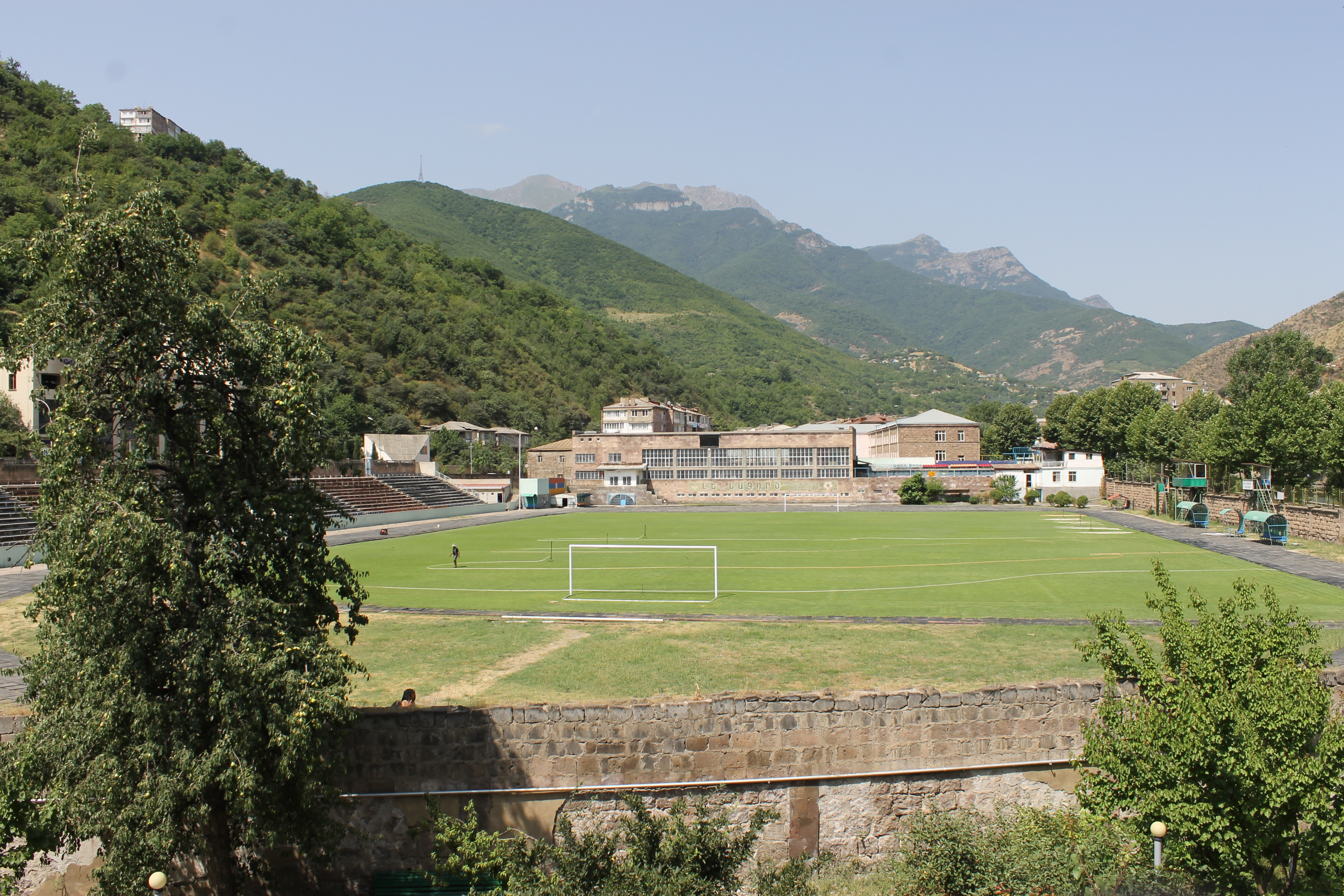
- Kapan Stadium Kapan Stadium
- Interactive map of Kapan Stadium
- Location: Kapan, Armenia
- Owner: Gandzasar Sprts Centre LLC
- Operator: Gandzasar Sports Centre LLC
- Capacity: 3,000
- Surface: grass
- Field size: 104 x 66 meters

Construction
- Built: 1963
- Renovated: 2008

Tenants
- Lernagorts Kapan (1963-2006); Gandzasar (2004-2017, 2022–); Syunik (2022–)

Kapan Stadium (Armenian: Կապանի մարզադաշտ) is a multi-purpose stadium in Kapan, the capital of Syunik Province, Armenia. It is currently used mostly for football matches and is the home ground of Gandzasar and Syunik. With a seating capacity of 3,000, Kapan Stadium is located at the centre of the town of Kapan, on the left bank of Voghji River, between Aram Manukian and Hovhannes Tumanyan streets. Kapan Town Hall is located at the eastern edge of the stadium

== Overview ==
The stadium was opened during the Soviet period in 1963 as Lernagorts Stadium, being home to Lernagorts Kapan. It remained under the ownership of the town council until 2004, when it was privatized and sold to the Gandzasar Sprts Centre LLC owned by Gagik Ohanjanyan.

By the end of 2008, the stadium went under a major renovation. The playing pitch was modernized and new seats were installed.

The average attendance at the stadium for FC Gandzasar Kapan at the Armenian Premier League matches is 1,500 spectators.

== Gallery ==
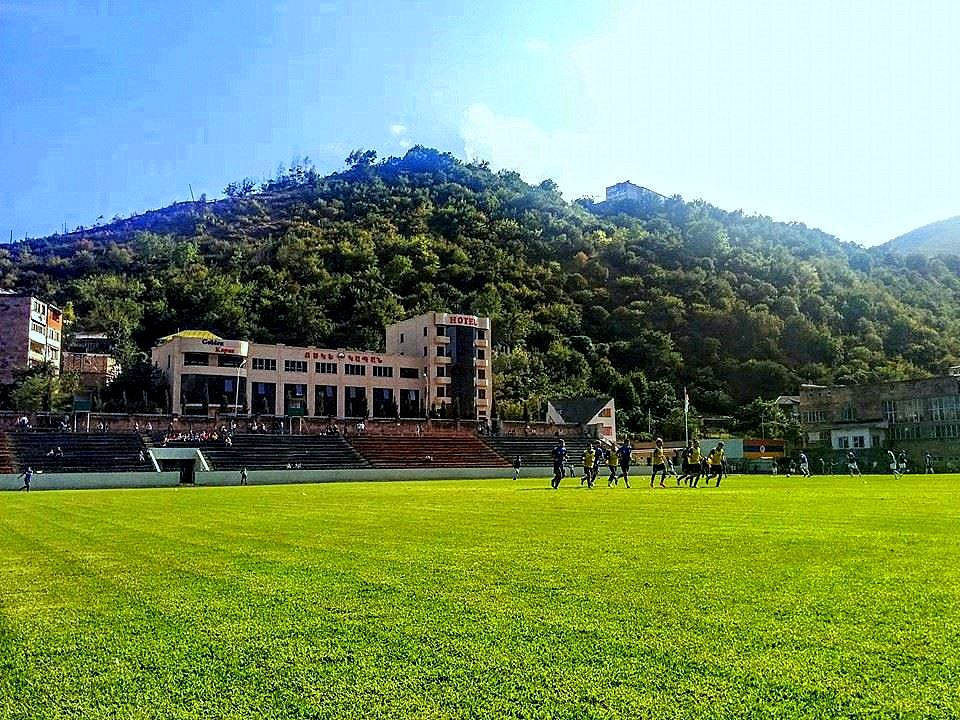
The main stand

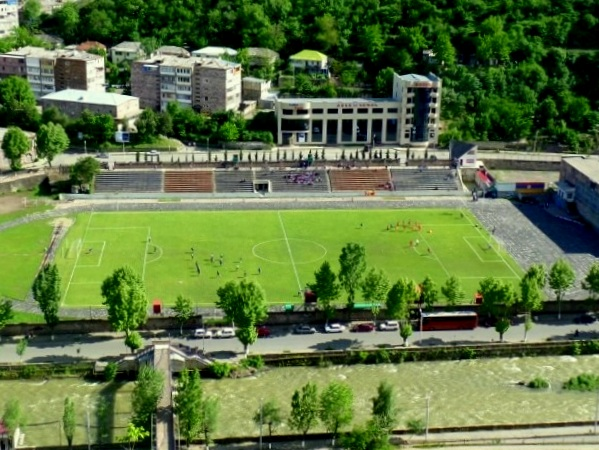
General view
