= 2010 Armenian Cup =

Tournament details
- Country: Armenia
- Teams: 8

Final positions
- Champions: Pyunik
- Runners-up: Banants

Tournament statistics
- Matches played: 13
- Goals scored: 25 (1.92 per match)

The 2010 Armenian Cup was the 19th season of Armenian knockout football competition. It featured only the 8 Premier League teams. The tournament started on 23 March 2010. Pyunik won their second consecutive cup with a 4–0 victory over Banants in the final. Because Pyunik qualified for the 2010–11 UEFA Champions League as league champions, Banants claimed the cup winner berth in the 2010–11 UEFA Europa League.

== Results ==
=== Quarter-finals ===
The eight clubs in that year's Armenian Premier League competed in this round. The first legs were played on 23 and 24 March 2010 and the second legs were played on 6 and 7 April 2010.

Team 1	Agg.	Team 2	1st leg	2nd leg
Gandzasar	1–3	Ulisses	1–1	0–2
Pyunik	2–0	Impulse	1–0	1–0
Shirak	0–4	Banants	0–1	0–3
Mika	4–0	Kilikia	3–0	1–0

=== Semi-finals ===
The four winners from the quarterfinals entered this round. The first legs were played on 13 and 14 April 2010 and the second legs were played on 20 and 21 April 2010

Team 1	Agg.	Team 2	1st leg	2nd leg
Ulisses	0–3	Pyunik	0–2	0–1
Banants	3–1	Mika	1–1	2–0

=== Final ===
10 May 2010
17:00 CEST

Pyunik	4 – 0	Banants
Manoyan 16'; Pizzelli 35'; Ghazaryan 45+3', 70'	Report

Vazgen Sargsyan Republican Stadium, Yerevan
Attendance: 8,000
Referee: Ararat Chagharyan

== See also ==
- 2010 Armenian Premier League
- 2010 Armenian First League
