= 2009 Armenian Premier League =

Armenian Premier League
- Season: 2009
- Champions: Pyunik; 12th Armenian title
- Relegated: Ararat
- Champions League: Pyunik
- Europa League: Mika; Ulisses
- Matches: 112
- Goals: 308 (2.75 per match)
- Top goalscorer: Artur Kocharyan (15 goals)
- Biggest home win: Mika 7-0 Shirak; Pyunik 7-0 Gandzasar
- Biggest away win: Gandzasar 0-4 Pyunik; Shirak 0-4 Mika
- Highest scoring: Mika 7-0 Shirak; Pyunik 7-0 Gandzasar

The 2009 Armenian Premier League season was the eighteenth since its establishment. The season began on 21 March 2009 and ended on 7 November 2009. FC Pyunik were the defending champions.

There were no teams promoted from the previous season of the First League. Therefore, Kilikia FC play another season in the top league. Only 8 teams were allowed to play in the 2009 Armenian Premier League.

The league was played in four stages. Teams played each other four times, twice at home and twice away. FC Pyunik gained maximum points after round 28 and were crowned champions; winning their ninth consecutive title, twelfth overall. Ararat Yerevan were relegated to Armenian First League.

== Participating teams ==
Location of teams in the 2009 Armenian Premier League

Club	Location	Stadium	Capacity
Ararat Yerevan	Yerevan	City Stadium (Abovyan)	3,946
Banants	Yerevan	Nairi Stadium	6,850
Gandzasar	Kapan	Gandzasar Stadium	3,500
Kilikia	Yerevan	Hrazdan Stadium	54,208
Mika	Yerevan	Mika Stadium	7,250
Pyunik	Yerevan	Republican Stadium	14,403
Shirak	Gyumri	Gyumri City Stadium	2,844
Ulisses	Yerevan	Mika Stadium	7,250

== League table ==
Pos	Team	Pld	W	D	L	GF	GA	GD	Pts	Qualification or relegation
1	Pyunik (C)	28	20	5	3	64	13	+51	65	Qualification for the Champions League second qualifying round
2	Mika	28	18	4	6	59	34	+25	58	Qualification for the Europa League second qualifying round
3	Ulisses	28	16	5	7	47	25	+22	53	Qualification for the Europa League first qualifying round
4	Banants	28	13	5	10	40	29	+11	44	Qualification for the Europa League first qualifying round
5	Gandzasar Kapan	28	12	2	14	32	47	−15	38	
6	Shirak	28	5	8	15	24	55	−31	23	
7	Kilikia	28	5	5	18	22	51	−29	20	
8	Ararat Yerevan (R)	28	2	8	18	20	54	−34	14	Relegation to First League

Source: ffa.am
Rules for classification: 1) points; 2) goal difference; 3) number of goals scored.
(C) Champions; (R) Relegated

== Results ==
=== First half of season ===
Home \ Away	ARA	BAN	GAN	KIL	MIK	PYU	SHI	ULI
Ararat Yerevan		0–3	0–2	0–2	0–1	0–2	1–3	0–1
Banants	1–0		1–0	3–0	1–2	1–4	5–1	1–3
Gandzasar Kapan	1–0	2–1		1–0	0–2	0–4	2–1	1–2
Kilikia	3–2	0–2	2–1		1–2	1–3	1–1	0–1
Mika	2–0	2–3	2–0	2–1		2–2	3–2	0–0
Pyunik	0–0	1–0	0–0	1–0	3–0		4–0	3–2
Shirak	1–0	1–2	0–0	3–1	0–4	0–0		0–0
Ulisses	3–0	0–1	5–0	1–0	1–2	0–3	3–0	

Source: ffa.am
Legend: Blue = home team win; Yellow = draw; Red = away team win.

=== Second half of season ===
Home \ Away	ARA	BAN	GAN	KIL	MIK	PYU	SHI	ULI
Ararat Yerevan		1–1	1–2	1–1	2–2	1–0	2–4	1–1
Banants	0–0		0–1	5–0	2–1	1–0	0–0	2–3
Gandzasar Kapan	2–3	1–2		4–1	3–1	0–2	4–1	0–3
Kilikia	0–0	1–1	0–1		3–2	0–3	2–0	0–3
Mika	5–1	3–1	3–1	2–1		2–0	7–0	2–0
Pyunik	6–0	1–0	7–0	1–0	4–0		4–0	2–1
Shirak	2–2	0–0	2–1	1–1	0–1	1–3		0–1
Ulisses	3–2	1–0	1–2	4–0	2–2	1–1	1–0	

Source: ffa.am
Legend: Blue = home team win; Yellow = draw; Red = away team win.

== Top goalscorers ==
Last updated: November 7, 2009; Source: ffa.am

Rank	Scorer	Team	Goals
1	(Armenia) Artur Kocharyan	Ulisses	15
2	(Armenia) Arsen Avetisyan	Gandzasar	14
2	(Ivory Coast) Boti Demel	Mika	14
4	(Armenia) Henrik Mkhitaryan	Pyunik	11
4	(Armenia) Samvel Melkonyan	Banants	11
4	(Armenia) Artyom Adamyan	Ulisses	11
7	(Armenia) Aram Voskanyan	Mika	10
7	(Armenia) Albert Tadevosyan	Pyunik	10
9	(Armenia) Marcos Pizzelli	Pyunik	9
10	(Armenia) Andranik Barikyan	Shirak	8

== Attendances ==
#	Club	Average
1	Gandzasar	1,111
2	Mika	911
3	Pyunik	804
4	Banants	621
5	Shirak	529
6	Ararat	378
7	Ulisses	374
8	Kilikia	184

== See also ==
- 2009 Armenian First League
- 2009 Armenian Cup
