= 2016–17 FC Alashkert season =

Alashkert
2016-17 season
- Chairman: Bagrat Navoyan
- Manager: Abraham Khashmanyan
- Stadium: Alashkert Stadium
- Premier League: 1st
- Armenian Cup: Quarterfinal vs Pyunik
- Champions League: Second qualifying round vs Dinamo Tbilisi
- Top goalscorer: League: Two Players (13); All: Two Players (13)

The 2016–17 season was Alashkert's fifth season in the Armenian Premier League and tenth overall, of which Alashkert were defending Premier League champions, having won the title previous season. Alashkert retained their title, seeing off Gandzasar Kapan by 7 points, were knocked out of the Armenian Cup in the Quarterfinals and reached the Second Qualifying Round in their first appearance in the Champions League.

== Season events ==
On 28 June, Alashkert drew 0-0 with Andorran Champions Santa Coloma in their first UEFA Champions League qualifier. In the second leg, on 5 July, Alashkert ran out 3-0 winners against 8-man Santa Coloma.

On 3 August, Alashkert announced the signing of Dmitri Kortava to a three-year contract from Luch-Energiya Vladivostok, However less than two weeks later, Kortava left Alashkert by mutual consent and signed for Neftekhimik Nizhnekamsk, with Yuriy Fomenko signing for Alashkert on the same day after his contract with Inter Baku had expired.

At the end of August 2016, Gevorg Poghosyan, Rafael Ghazaryan, Aram Loretsyan and Marat Daudov all left Alashkert to sign for Ararat Yerevan.

In December 2016, Abraham Khashmanyan returned to Alashkert as manager, having previously resigned from the role following their Armenian Cup defeat to Pyunik in the October.

In February 2017, Alashkert took Serbian defender Danijel Stojković, Iranian midfielder Arsia Jabbari, Serbian Forward Uroš Nenadović and Brazilian forward Valdir Da Silva Filho on trial during their winter training camp in Antalya.

== Squad ==
As of 27 March 2017

Note: Flags indicate national team as defined under FIFA eligibility rules; some limited exceptions apply. Players may hold more than one non-FIFA nationality.

| No. | Pos. | Nation | Player |
|---|---|---|---|
| 1 | GK | ARM | Gevorg Kasparov (vice-captain) |
| 2 | DF | UKR | Dmytro Khovbosha |
| 3 | DF | ARM | Andranik Voskanyan |
| 4 | MF | SRB | Sasa Filipović |
| 5 | DF | SRB | Danijel Stojković |
| 6 | MF | ARM | Ararat Arakelyan |
| 7 | FW | ARM | Mihran Manasyan |
| 8 | MF | ARM | Gagik Daghbashyan |
| 9 | MF | ARM | Artak Dashyan |
| 10 | MF | ARM | Khoren Veranyan |
| 11 | MF | GEO | Irakli Kvekveskiri |
| 12 | FW | RUS | Atsamaz Buraev |

| No. | Pos. | Nation | Player |
|---|---|---|---|
| 13 | MF | ARM | Benik Hovhannisyan |
| 15 | MF | SRB | Uroš Nenadović |
| 17 | DF | ARM | Artak Yedigaryan |
| 19 | DF | ARM | Vahagn Minasyan (captain) |
| 20 | MF | ARM | Artur Yedigaryan |
| 21 | MF | ARM | Artak Grigoryan |
| 22 | MF | ARM | Zaven Badoyan |
| 55 | GK | ARM | Edvard Hovhannisyan |
| 77 | FW | TTO | Lester Peltier |
| 93 | GK | ARM | Arsen Beglaryan |
| — | FW | ARM | Narek Beglaryan |
| — | FW | ARM | Gevorg Nranyan |

== Transfers ==
=== In ===
| Date | Position | Nationality | Name | From | Fee | Ref. |
|---|---|---|---|---|---|---|
| 1 July 2016 | GK | (Armenia) | Arsen Beglaryan | Mika | Undisclosed | |
| 1 July 2016 | GK | (Armenia) | Samvel Melkonyan | Mika | Undisclosed | |
| 1 July 2016 | DF | (Ukraine) | Dmytro Khovbosha | Kremin Kremenchuk | Undisclosed | |
| 1 July 2016 | DF | (Serbia) | Aleksandar Tasić | Tërbuni Pukë | Undisclosed | |
| 1 July 2016 | MF | (Armenia) | Artak Dashyan | Vardar | Undisclosed | |
| 1 July 2016 | MF | (Ukraine) | Anton Savin | Hirnyk-Sport Horishni Plavni | Undisclosed | |
| 1 July 2016 | MF | (Ukraine) | Marat Daudov | Hirnyk-Sport Horishni Plavni | Undisclosed | |
| 3 July 2016 | MF | (Georgia (country)) | Irakli Kvekveskiri | Guria Lanchkhuti | Undisclosed | |
| 31 July 2016 | DF | (Armenia) | Gagik Daghbashyan | Ružomberok | Undisclosed | |
| 31 July 2016 | MF | (Armenia) | Benik Hovhannisyan | Ararat Yerevan | Undisclosed | |
| 3 August 2016 | FW | (Russia) | Dmitri Kortava | Luch-Energiya Vladivostok | Undisclosed | |
| 16 August 2016 | FW | (Ukraine) | Yuriy Fomenko | Inter Baku | Free | |
| 26 August 2016 | DF | (Russia) | Marat Butuyev | Tskhinvali | Undisclosed | |
| 1 January 2017 | MF | (Armenia) | Mher Sahakyan | Ararat Yerevan | Undisclosed | |
| 1 January 2017 | FW | (Armenia) | Gevorg Nranyan | Ararat Yerevan | Undisclosed | |
| 25 January 2017 | FW | (Serbia) | Narek Beglaryan | Zhetysu | Undisclosed | |
| 14 February 2017 | DF | (Serbia) | Danijel Stojković | Radnik Surdulica | Undisclosed | |
| 14 February 2017 | FW | (Serbia) | Uroš Nenadović | Radnik Surdulica | Undisclosed | |
| 21 February 2017 | FW | (Trinidad and Tobago) | Lester Peltier | Maasmechelen | Undisclosed | |
| 28 February 2017 | MF | (Armenia) | Zaven Badoyan | Gomel | Undisclosed | |
| 28 February 2017 | MF | (Serbia) | Sasa Filipovic | Napredak Kruševac | Undisclosed | |
| 28 February 2017 | FW | (Russia) | Atsamaz Burayev | Banants | Undisclosed | |

=== Out ===
| Date | Position | Nationality | Name | To | Fee | Ref. |
|---|---|---|---|---|---|---|
| 1 July 2016 | MF | (Armenia) | Davit Minasyan | Kotayk | Undisclosed | |
| 1 July 2016 | FW | (Armenia) | Vardan Bakalyan | Gandzasar Kapan | Undisclosed | |
| 2 August 2016 | MF | (Armenia) | Aram Bareghamyan | Banants | Undisclosed | |
| 3 August 2016 | DF | (Armenia) | Artur Avagyan | Banants | Undisclosed | |
| 31 August 2016 | DF | (Armenia) | Gevorg Poghosyan | Ararat Yerevan | Undisclosed | |
| 31 August 2016 | MF | (Armenia) | Rafael Ghazaryan | Ararat Yerevan | Undisclosed | |
| 31 August 2016 | MF | (Armenia) | Aram Loretsyan | Ararat Yerevan | Undisclosed | |
| 31 August 2016 | MF | (Ukraine) | Marat Daudov | Ararat Yerevan | Undisclosed | |
| 17 January 2017 | MF | (Armenia) | Aram Hovsepyan | Ararat Yerevan | Undisclosed | |
| 16 March 2017 | MF | (Ukraine) | Anton Savin | Sumy | Undisclosed | |
| 1 January 2017 | MF | (Armenia) | Karen Muradyan | Gällivare Malmbergets | Undisclosed | |
| 1 January 2017 | FW | (Armenia) | Norayr Gyozalyan | Banants | Undisclosed | |
| 26 January 2017 | DF | (Serbia) | Aleksandar Tasić | Novi Pazar | Undisclosed | |
| 24 February 2017 | DF | (Russia) | Marat Butuyev | Kolomna | Undisclosed | |

=== Released ===
| Date | Position | Nationality | Name | Joined | Date |
|---|---|---|---|---|---|
| 13 July 2016 | DF | (Armenia) | Gagik Poghosyan | Virgen del Camino | 25 November 2016 |
| 16 August 2016 | FW | (Russia) | Dmitri Kortava | Neftekhimik Nizhnekamsk | 16 August 2016 |
| 31 December 2016 | GK | (Armenia) | Samvel Melkonyan | Retired | |
| 31 December 2016 | MF | (Armenia) | Arsen Balabekyan | Retired | |
| 22 March 2017 | FW | (Ukraine) | Yuriy Fomenko | Poltava | 13 July 2017 |
| 2 June 2017 | MF | (Georgia (country)) | Irakli Kvekveskiri | Ararat Moscow | |
| 30 June 2017 | MF | (Serbia) | Sasa Filipović | Borac Čačak | |
| 30 June 2017 | FW | (Armenia) | Narek Beglaryan | | |
| 30 June 2017 | FW | (Russia) | Atsamaz Burayev | Zhetysu | 5 July 2017 |

== Competitions ==
=== Armenian Supercup ===
| 24 September 2016 | Alashkert | 1 – 1 (3 – 2 p) | Banants | Yerevan |
| 19:00 (UTC+4) | Balabekyan (yellow card) 29'; Arakelyan (yellow card) 43'; Arta.Yedigaryan (yellow card) 47'; Artu.Yedigaryan 52' | Report | Laércio 45' (pen.); Kachmazov (yellow card) 47'; Torrejón (yellow card) 119' | Stadium: Vazgen Sargsyan Republican Stadium; Attendance: 700; Referee: Zaven Hovhannisyan |
| | Penalties |
| | Artu.Yedigaryan (penalty missed); Minasyan (penalty scored); Arta.Yedigaryan (penalty scored); Voskanyan (penalty scored); Kasparov (penalty missed) | | (penalty scored) Torrejón; (penalty missed) Adams; (penalty missed) Minasyan; (penalty scored) Kachmazov; (penalty missed) Laércio |

=== Premier League ===
==== Results summary ====
| Overall | | | | | | | | Home | | | | | | Away | | | | | |
| Pld | W | D | L | GF | GA | GD | Pts | W | D | L | GF | GA | GD | W | D | L | GF | GA | GD |
|---|---|---|---|---|---|---|---|---|---|---|---|---|---|---|---|---|---|---|---|
| 30 | 19 | 7 | 4 | 59 | 26 | +33 | 64 | 7 | 5 | 3 | 28 | 17 | +11 | 12 | 2 | 1 | 31 | 9 | +22 |

Last updated: 31 May 2017.
Source: See Results

==== Results ====
| 7 August 2016 1 | Alashkert | 0 – 0 | Gandzasar Kapan | Yerevan |
| 18:00 (UTC+4) | Daghbashyan (yellow card) 67'; Minasyan (yellow card) 90+2' | Report | H.Asoyan (yellow card) 90+2' | Stadium: Alashkert Stadium; Attendance: 500; Referee: Zaven Hovhannisyan |

| 13 August 2016 2 | Pyunik | 1 – 2 | Alashkert | Yerevan |
| 19:00 (UTC+4) | A.Arakelyan 25'; Grigoryan (yellow card) 27'; A.Manucharyan (yellow card) 43'; Ra.Hakobyan (yellow card) 60'; Avetisyan (yellow card) 75'; H.Poghosyan (red card) 90+2' | Report | Arta.Yedigaryan 20'; A.Beglaryan (yellow card) 43'; B.Hovhannisyan (yellow card) 50'; M.Manasyan 62'; Grigoryan (yellow card) 81' | Stadium: Yerevan Football Academy Stadium; Attendance: 500; Referee: Artur Simonyan |

| 21 August 2016 3 | Alashkert | 3 – 0 | Banants | Yerevan |
| 17:00 (UTC+4) | Daghbashyan (yellow card) 34'; Dashyan 47'; Kvekveskiri (yellow card) 68'; Artu.Yedigaryan 76'; Fomenko 83' | Report | Laércio (yellow card) 49' | Stadium: Alashkert Stadium; Attendance: 500; Referee: Artur Safaryan |

| 27 August 2016 4 | Shirak | 2 – 2 | Alashkert | Gyumri |
| 17:00 (UTC+4) | Daghbashyan 16' (o.g.); V.Ayvazyan 44'; A.Davoyan (yellow card) 57'; M.Kaba (yellow card) 68' | Report | K.Veranyan (yellow card) 4'; Kvekveskiri (yellow card) 26' (goal) 47'; A.Mikaelyan 61' (o.g.); Tasić (yellow card) 69' | Stadium: Gyumri City Stadium; Attendance: 1,100; Referee: Suren Baliyan |

| 10 September 2016 5 | Alashkert | 1 – 3 | Ararat Yerevan | Yerevan |
| 16:00 (UTC+4) | Artu.Yedigaryan 46' (yellow card) 79' | Report | Nwabueze 6', 55' (yellow card) 57'; O.Kaina (yellow card) 17'; N.Kpehia (yellow card) 52' (goal) 76'; P.Ter-Petrosyan (yellow card) 90+3' | Stadium: Alashkert Stadium; Attendance: 500; Referee: Gevorg Eghoyan |

| 18 September 2016 6 | Gandzasar Kapan | 0 – 2 | Alashkert | Kapan |
| 16:00 (UTC+4) | | Report | Meliksetyan 13' (o.g.); Fomenko 31'; M.Manasyan (yellow card) 48' | Stadium: Gandzasar Stadium; Attendance: 800; Referee: Artur Simonyan |

| 27 September 2016 7 | Alashkert | 0 – 0 | Pyunik | Yerevan |
| 16:00 (UTC+4) | Kvekveskiri (yellow card) 19'; Muradyan (yellow card) 29' | Report | V.Pogosyan (yellow card) 64' | Stadium: Alashkert Stadium; Attendance: 400; Referee: Suren Baliyan |

| 2 October 2016 8 | Banants | 0 – 3 | Alashkert | Yerevan |
| 16:00 (UTC+4) | Adams (yellow card) 63' | Report | Artu.Yedigaryan 17', 37'; Arta.Yedigaryan (yellow card) 31'; M.Manasyan (yellow card) 34' (goal) 69'; Fomenko (yellow card) 53'; Minasyan (yellow card) 70' | Stadium: Banants Stadium; Attendance: 800; Referee: Zaven Hovhannisyan |

| 16 October 2016 9 | Alashkert | 1 – 1 | Shirak | Yerevan |
| 15:00 (UTC+4) | Gyozalyan 33' (pen.); Khovbosha (yellow card) 38'; Minasyan (yellow card) 53'; Tasić (yellow card) 86' | Report | Gogichayev 75' | Stadium: Alashkert Stadium; Attendance: 500; Referee: Suren Baliyan |

| 22 October 2016 10 | Ararat Yerevan | 1 – 2 | Alashkert | Yerevan |
| 18:00 (UTC+4) | R.Safaryan (yellow card) 42'; A.Loretsyan 64' | Report | M.Manasyan 15'; Grigoryan (yellow card) 72'; Minasyan (yellow card) 79' (goal) 90+2' | Stadium: Vazgen Sargsyan Republican Stadium; Attendance: 300; Referee: Artur Simonyan |

| 27 October 2016 11 | Alashkert | 0 – 4 | Gandzasar Kapan | Yerevan |
| 15:00 (UTC+4) | Muradyan (yellow card) 8'; Daghbashyan (yellow card) 32'; Gyozalyan (yellow card) 47'; A.Beglaryan (yellow card) 68' | Report | Claudir 13'; Meliksetyan (yellow card) 45'; A.Khachatryan (yellow card) 47'; G.Harutyunyan 52', 89'; Grigoryan 68' (o.g.) | Stadium: Alashkert Stadium; Attendance: 400; Referee: Suren Baliyan |

| 30 October 2016 12 | Pyunik | 2 – 1 | Alashkert | Yerevan |
| 16:00 (UTC+4) | A.Kartashyan (yellow card) 17'; A.Manucharyan 30'; Grigoryan (yellow card) 43'; V.Pogosyan 48' (pen.); N.Aslanyan (yellow card) 81' | Report | Arta.Yedigaryan 69' | Stadium: Yerevan Football Academy Stadium; Attendance: 400; Referee: Zaven Hovhannisyan |

| 5 November 2016 13 | Alashkert | 4 – 1 | Banants | Yerevan |
| 14:00 (UTC+4) | Arta.Yedigaryan 6', 79'; K.Veranyan 71'; M.Manasyan (yellow card) 81'; Grigoryan 90+2' | Report | V.Ayvazyan 37'; H.Hambardzumyan (yellow card) 83' | Stadium: Alashkert Stadium; Attendance: 300; Referee: Artur Simonyan |

| 20 November 2016 14 | Shirak | 0 – 0 | Alashkert | Gyumri |
| 15:00 (UTC+4) | A.Hovhannisyan (yellow card) 23'; D.Hakobyan (yellow card) 47'; Udo (yellow card) 73' | Report | Voskanyan (yellow card) 64'; Grigoryan (yellow card) 90' | Stadium: Gyumri City Stadium; Attendance: 1,000; Referee: Artur Simonyan |

| 23 November 2016 15 | Alashkert | 4 – 1 | Ararat Yerevan | Yerevan |
| 15:00 (UTC+4) | M.Manasyan 22', 79', 84', 90' (pen.); Artu.Yedigaryan (yellow card) 72'; Kvekveskiri (yellow card) 77' | Report | R.Safaryan (yellow card) 20' (goal) 56'; R.Ghazaryan (yellow card) 60'; Gareginyan (yellow card) 64' | Stadium: Alashkert Stadium; Attendance: 350; Referee: Artur Safaryan |

| 27 November 2016 16 | Gandzasar Kapan | 1 – 2 | Alashkert | Kapan |
| 15:00 (UTC+4) | G.Harutyunyan 14'; Wbeymar (yellow card) 35'; A.Karapetyan (yellow card) 83'; Al.Petrosyan (yellow card) 85' (red card) 88' | Report | Minasyan (yellow card) 35'; Dashyan 40'; Arta.Yedigaryan 86' (pen.); A.Grigoryan (yellow card) 90' | Stadium: Gandzasar Stadium; Attendance: 1,000; Referee: Artur Simonyan |

| 4 December 2016 17 | Alashkert | 0 – 0 | Pyunik | Yerevan |
| 14:00 (UTC+4) | Tasić (yellow card) 22'; Artu.Yedigaryan (yellow card) 55' | Report | R.Hakobyan (yellow card) 54' | Stadium: Alashkert Stadium; Attendance: 700; Referee: Zaven Hovhannisyan |

| 4 March 2017 18 | Banants | 1 – 2 | Alashkert | Yerevan |
| 14:00 (UTC+4) | K.Melkonyan 89' | Report | Voskanyan (yellow card) 8'; Minasyan 27' (yellow card) 42'; Nenadović 32'; Grigoryan (yellow card) 41'; Kvekveskiri (yellow card) 78' | Stadium: Banants Stadium; Attendance: 1,000; Referee: Artur Safaryan |

| 12 March 2017 19 | Alashkert | 3 – 0 | Shirak | Yerevan |
| 14:00 (UTC+4) | Yedigaryan 11'; Dashyan 37'; Nenadović 45'; Yedigaryan (yellow card) 72' | Report | A.Muradyan (yellow card) 61'; R.Darbinyan (yellow card) 88' | Stadium: Alashkert Stadium; Attendance: 700; Referee: Zaven Hovhannisyan |

| 17 March 2017 20 | Ararat Yerevan | 0 – 3 | Alashkert | Yerevan |
| 14:00 (UTC+4) | S.Mkrtchyan (yellow card) 42' | Report | Peltier (yellow card) 30'; M.Manasyan 73', 77'; Badoyan 83' | Stadium: Banants-3; Attendance: 500; Referee: Artur Safaryan |

| 30 March 2017 21 | Alashkert | 1 – 2 | Gandzasar Kapan | Yerevan |
| 15:00 (UTC+4) | Khovbosha (yellow card) 42'; M.Manasyan (yellow card) 45+2'; Voskanyan (yellow card) 53'; A.Khachatryan 63' (o.g.) | Report | V.Minasyan (yellow card) 33'; G.Harutyunyan 44'; Memović (yellow card) 58'; Yuspashyan (yellow card) 63'; Wal 71'; S.Shahinyan (yellow card) 82' | Stadium: Alashkert Stadium; Attendance: 300; Referee: Suren Baliyan |

| 7 April 2017 22 | Pyunik | 0 – 3 | Alashkert | Yerevan |
| 16:00 (UTC+4) | Grigoryan (yellow card) 79' | Report | Voskanyan (yellow card) 23'; K.Veranyan (yellow card) 31'; Nenadović 39'; Minasyan 63'; Khovbosha (yellow card) 63'; A.Beglaryan (yellow card) 83'; Arta.Yedigaryan 89' (pen.) | Stadium: Yerevan Football Academy Stadium; Attendance: 300; Referee: Suren Baliyan |

| 14 April 2017 23 | Alashkert | 2 – 0 | Banants | Yerevan |
| 16:00 (UTC+4) | Arta.Yedigaryan 29', 49' (yellow card) 87' | Report | Ghazaryan (red card) 25'; Ayrapetyan (yellow card) 52'; K.Harutyunyan (yellow card) 77' | Stadium: Alashkert Stadium; Attendance: 300; Referee: Suren Baliyan |

| 23 April 2017 24 | Shirak | 0 – 1 | Alashkert | Gyumri |
| 17:00 (UTC+4) | A.Hovhannisyan (yellow card) 90' | Report | Arakelyan 25'; Voskanyan (red card) 90+4' | Stadium: Gyumri City Stadium; Attendance: 700; Referee: Suren Baliyan |

| 29 April 2017 25 | Alashkert | 3 – 1 | Ararat Yerevan | Yerevan |
| 17:00 (UTC+4) | Arta.Yedigaryan 17', 54' (pen.); Khovbosha (yellow card) 57'; Badoyan 90+3' | Report | E.Mkrtchyan 13' (yellow card) 48' | Stadium: Alashkert Stadium; Attendance: 400; Referee: Zaven Hovhannisyan |

| 6 May 2017 26 | Gandzasar Kapan | 0 – 1 | Alashkert | Yerevan |
| 19:00 (UTC+4) | Claudir (yellow card) 30' | Report | G.Daghbashyan (yellow card) 60'; Wbeymar 69' (o.g.); A.Beglaryan (yellow card) 90+2' | Stadium: Vazgen Sargsyan Republican Stadium; Attendance: 800; Referee: Suren Baliyan |

| 13 May 2017 27 | Alashkert | 3 – 3 | Pyunik | Yerevan |
| 17:00 (UTC+4) | Badoyan 13'; Dashyan 50', 59' (pen.) | Report | A.Kartashyan 37'; V.Pogosyan 38' (yellow card) 84'; N.Aslanyan 48' | Stadium: Alashkert Stadium; Attendance: 400; Referee: Zaven Hovhannisyan |

| 19 May 2017 28 | Banants | 0 – 3 | Alashkert | Yerevan |
| 17:00 (UTC+4) | Injac (yellow card) 24'; H. Hakobyan (yellow card) 61'; Z.Margaryan (yellow card) 73' | Report | M.Manasyan 49'; K.Veranyan (yellow card) 59'; Arta.Yedigaryan 66'; Dashyan 70' | Stadium: Banants Stadium; Attendance: 500; Referee: Gevorg Eghoyan |

| 28 May 2017 29 | Alashkert | 3 – 1 | Shirak | Yerevan |
| 17:00 (UTC+4) | Voskanyan (yellow card) 15'; Arta.Yedigaryan 41'; Artu.Yedigaryan (yellow card) 44'; M.Manasyan 54', 63' | Report | Udo (yellow card) 43'; M.Kaba (yellow card) 47'; A.Muradyan 67' (yellow card) 90+2' | Stadium: Alashkert Stadium; Attendance: 1,000; Referee: Suren Baliyan |

| 31 May 2017 30 | Ararat Yerevan | 1 – 4 | Alashkert | Yerevan |
| 18:00 (UTC+4) | Gareginyan (yellow card) 45'; M.Arustamyan 73' | Report | M.Manasyan 13', 47'; Arta.Yedigaryan (yellow card) 45'; Khovbosha (yellow card) 51'; S.Filipović (yellow card) 57'; Beglaryan 65'; G.Nranyan 76' | Stadium: Banants-3; Attendance: 3,000; Referee: Gevorg Eghoyan |

==== Table ====
| Pos | Team | Pld | W | D | L | GF | GA | GD | Pts | Qualification |
|---|---|---|---|---|---|---|---|---|---|---|
| 1 | Alashkert (C) | 30 | 19 | 7 | 4 | 59 | 26 | +33 | 64 | Qualification for the Champions League first qualifying round |
| 2 | Gandzasar Kapan | 30 | 17 | 6 | 7 | 38 | 24 | +14 | 57 | Qualification for the Europa League first qualifying round (Note: Shirak qualified for Europa League first qualifying round by winning the 2016–17 Armenian Cup. However, since they already qualified for European competition based on their league position, the spot awarded to the cup winners was passed down the league.) |
| 3 | Shirak | 30 | 16 | 5 | 9 | 31 | 24 | +7 | 53 | Qualification for the Europa League first qualifying round |
| 4 | Pyunik | 30 | 12 | 9 | 9 | 35 | 27 | +8 | 45 | Qualification for the Europa League first qualifying round |
| 5 | Banants | 30 | 5 | 6 | 19 | 18 | 44 | −26 | 21 | |
| 6 | Ararat Yerevan | 30 | 3 | 3 | 24 | 17 | 53 | −36 | 12 | |

Source: Football Federation of Armenia (in Armenian), Soccerway
Rules for classification: 1) Points; 2) Play-off (only if deciding champion); 3) Matches won; 4) Head-to-head points; 5) Head-to-head matches won; 6) Head-to-head goal difference; 7) Head-to-head goals scored; 8) Head-to-head away goals scored; 9) Goal difference; 10) Goals scored.
(C) Champions

=== Armenian Cup ===
| 21 September 2016 Quarterfinal 1st leg | Alashkert | 1 – 2 | Pyunik | Yerevan |
| 16:00 (UTC+4) | Voskanyan (yellow card) 2'; Fomenko (yellow card) 43' (goal) 47'; Kvekveskiri (yellow card) 77'; Artu.Yedigaryan (yellow card) 86' | Report | A.Arakelyan 4'; Hovhannisyan 13' (yellow card) 61'; A.Manucharyan (yellow card) 81' | Stadium: Alashkert Stadium; Attendance: 600; Referee: Artur Simonyan |

| 19 October 2016 Quarterfinal 2nd leg | Pyunik | 1 – 0 (3 – 1 agg.) | Alashkert | Yerevan |
| 18:00 (UTC+4) | Hovhannisyan (yellow card) 45' (goal) 87' | Report | Tasić (yellow card) 16'; Khovbosha (yellow card) 25'; Kvekveskiri (yellow card) 45' | Stadium: Yerevan Football Academy Stadium; Attendance: 300; Referee: Artur Simonyan |

=== UEFA Champions League ===
==== Qualifying rounds ====
| 28 June 2016 First qualifying round 1st leg | Santa Coloma (Andorra) | 0 – 0 | (Armenia) Alashkert | Andorra la Vella, Andorra |
| 22:00 (UTC+4) | Rebés (yellow card) 40'; Pujol (yellow card) 50' | Report | Tasić (yellow card) 15' | Stadium: Estadi Comunal; Attendance: 600; Referee: Alex Troleis (Faroe Islands) |

| 5 July 2016 First qualifying round 2nd leg | Alashkert (Armenia) | 3 – 0 (3 – 0 agg.) | (Andorra) Santa Coloma | Yerevan, Armenia |
| 19:00 (UTC+4) | V. Minasyan 12'; M.Manasyan (red card) 26'; Gyozalyan 84'; Artur Yedigaryan 88' | Report | Lima (yellow card) 10'; Martínez (yellow card) 26' (red card) 90'; F.Gonzalez (yellow card) 45+2' (yellow-red card) 60'; E.Casals (yellow card) 50'; Rodríguez (yellow card) 52'; A.Ramos (yellow card) 73'; Capdevila (yellow card) 86'; Parra (red card) 90+4' | Stadium: Republican Stadium; Attendance: 2,100; Referee: Alexandr Aliyev (Kazakhstan) |
Note: Match played at the Republican Stadium in Yerevan, instead of their regular Alashkert Stadium in Yerevan.

| 12 July 2016 Second qualifying round 1st leg | Dinamo Tbilisi (Georgia (country)) | 2 – 0 | (Armenia) Alashkert | Tbilisi, Georgia |
| 21:00 (UTC+4) | Kiteishvili (yellow card) 51' (goal) 55'; Kvilitaia 69' (pen.) | Report | Minasyan (yellow card) 28'; G.Poghosyan (yellow card) 37'; A.Bareghamyan (yellow card) 70' | Stadium: Boris Paichadze Dinamo Arena; Attendance: 11,769; Referee: Sebastian Colțescu (Romania) |

| 19 July 2016 Second qualifying round 2nd leg | Alashkert (Armenia) | 1 – 1 (1 – 3 agg.) | (Georgia (country)) Dinamo Tbilisi | Yerevan, Armenia |
| 19:00 (UTC+4) | Gyozalyan 51'; Artu.Yedigaryan (yellow card) 54'; Grigoryan (yellow card) 59'; Kvekveskiri (yellow card) 71' | Report | Jigauri 21'; Chelidze (yellow card) 54' | Stadium: Republican Stadium; Attendance: 4,600; Referee: Mohammed Al-Hakim (Sweden) |
Note: Match played at the Republican Stadium in Yerevan, instead of their regular Alashkert Stadium in Yerevan.

== Statistics ==
As of match played 31 May 2017

=== Appearances and goals ===
| No. | Pos | Nat | Player | Total | | Premier League | | Armenian Cup | | Supercup | | UEFA Champions League | |
| No. | Pos | Nat | Player | Apps | Goals | Apps | Goals | Apps | Goals | Apps | Goals | Apps | Goals |
|---|---|---|---|---|---|---|---|---|---|---|---|---|---|
| 1 | GK | (Armenia) ARM | Gevorg Kasparov | 15 | 0 | 10 | 0 | 0 | 0 | 1 | 0 | 4 | 0 |
| 2 | DF | (Ukraine) UKR | Dmytro Khovbosha | 22 | 0 | 19 | 0 | 2 | 0 | 0 | 0 | 1 | 0 |
| 3 | DF | (Armenia) ARM | Andranik Voskanyan | 28 | 0 | 23 | 0 | 2 | 0 | 1 | 0 | 2 | 0 |
| 4 | MF | (Serbia) SRB | Sasa Filipović | 4 | 0 | 2+2 | 0 | 0 | 0 | 0 | 0 | 0 | 0 |
| 5 | DF | (Serbia) SRB | Danijel Stojković | 10 | 0 | 10 | 0 | 0 | 0 | 0 | 0 | 0 | 0 |
| 6 | DF | (Armenia) ARM | Ararat Arakelyan | 18 | 1 | 16 | 1 | 1 | 0 | 1 | 0 | 0 | 0 |
| 7 | FW | (Armenia) ARM | Mihran Manasyan | 31 | 13 | 24+3 | 13 | 2 | 0 | 0 | 0 | 2 | 0 |
| 8 | DF | (Armenia) ARM | Gagik Daghbashyan | 24 | 0 | 22+1 | 0 | 0 | 0 | 1 | 0 | 0 | 0 |
| 9 | MF | (Armenia) ARM | Artak Dashyan | 33 | 6 | 19+8 | 6 | 1 | 0 | 1 | 0 | 3+1 | 0 |
| 10 | MF | (Armenia) ARM | Khoren Veranyan | 27 | 1 | 12+11 | 1 | 1 | 0 | 0 | 0 | 2+1 | 0 |
| 11 | MF | (Georgia (country)) GEO | Irakli Kvekveskiri | 28 | 1 | 18+7 | 1 | 2 | 0 | 0 | 0 | 1 | 0 |
| 12 | FW | (Russia) RUS | Atsamaz Burayev | 1 | 0 | 0+1 | 0 | 0 | 0 | 0 | 0 | 0 | 0 |
| 13 | MF | (Armenia) ARM | Benik Hovhannisyan | 3 | 0 | 1+2 | 0 | 0 | 0 | 0 | 0 | 0 | 0 |
| 15 | MF | (Serbia) SRB | Uroš Nenadović | 11 | 4 | 10+1 | 4 | 0 | 0 | 0 | 0 | 0 | 0 |
| 17 | DF | (Armenia) ARM | Artak Yedigaryan | 34 | 13 | 27+1 | 13 | 0+1 | 0 | 1 | 0 | 4 | 0 |
| 19 | DF | (Armenia) ARM | Vahagn Minasyan | 29 | 4 | 22+1 | 3 | 0+1 | 0 | 1 | 0 | 4 | 1 |
| 20 | MF | (Armenia) ARM | Artur Yedigaryan | 33 | 6 | 12+15 | 4 | 0+2 | 0 | 1 | 1 | 1+2 | 1 |
| 21 | MF | (Armenia) ARM | Artak Grigoryan | 32 | 1 | 24+2 | 1 | 1 | 0 | 0+1 | 0 | 4 | 0 |
| 22 | MF | (Armenia) ARM | Zaven Badoyan | 7 | 3 | 3+4 | 3 | 0 | 0 | 0 | 0 | 0 | 0 |
| 77 | FW | (Trinidad and Tobago) TTO | Lester Peltier | 10 | 0 | 6+4 | 0 | 0 | 0 | 0 | 0 | 0 | 0 |
| 93 | GK | (Armenia) ARM | Arsen Beglaryan | 22 | 0 | 20 | 0 | 2 | 0 | 0 | 0 | 0 | 0 |
| | DF | (Armenia) ARM | Alen Hambartsumyan | 1 | 0 | 1 | 0 | 0 | 0 | 0 | 0 | 0 | 0 |
| | DF | (Armenia) ARM | Mikayel Khashmanyan | 1 | 0 | 1 | 0 | 0 | 0 | 0 | 0 | 0 | 0 |
| | FW | (Armenia) ARM | Narek Beglaryan | 1 | 1 | 0+1 | 1 | 0 | 0 | 0 | 0 | 0 | 0 |
| | FW | (Armenia) ARM | Gevorg Nranyan | 1 | 1 | 0+1 | 1 | 0 | 0 | 0 | 0 | 0 | 0 |
Players who left Alashkert during the season:
| 4 | DF | (Serbia) SRB | Aleksandar Tasić | 15 | 0 | 7+2 | 0 | 2 | 0 | 0 | 0 | 4 | 0 |
| 5 | MF | (Armenia) ARM | Karen Muradyan | 13 | 0 | 6+2 | 0 | 1 | 0 | 0 | 0 | 4 | 0 |
| 8 | MF | (Armenia) ARM | Rafael Ghazaryan | 2 | 0 | 0 | 0 | 0 | 0 | 0 | 0 | 0+2 | 0 |
| 11 | FW | (Armenia) ARM | Arsen Balabekyan | 4 | 0 | 1+1 | 0 | 0+1 | 0 | 1 | 0 | 0 | 0 |
| 12 | MF | (Armenia) ARM | Artur Avagyan | 1 | 0 | 0 | 0 | 0 | 0 | 0 | 0 | 0+1 | 0 |
| 12 | FW | (Ukraine) UKR | Yuriy Fomenko | 18 | 3 | 4+11 | 2 | 2 | 1 | 0+1 | 0 | 0 | 0 |
| 13 | DF | (Armenia) ARM | Gevorg Poghosyan | 3 | 0 | 0 | 0 | 0 | 0 | 0 | 0 | 3 | 0 |
| 14 | DF | (Armenia) ARM | Aram Bareghamyan | 1 | 0 | 0 | 0 | 0 | 0 | 0 | 0 | 0+1 | 0 |
| 14 | MF | (Armenia) ARM | Samvel Melkonyan | 7 | 0 | 1+3 | 0 | 1 | 0 | 0 | 0 | 0+2 | 0 |
| 18 | DF | (Russia) RUS | Marat Butuyev | 2 | 0 | 2 | 0 | 0 | 0 | 0 | 0 | 0 | 0 |
| 18 | MF | (Ukraine) UKR | Anton Savin | 9 | 0 | 2+1 | 0 | 1+1 | 0 | 0+1 | 0 | 3 | 0 |
| 22 | FW | (Armenia) ARM | Norayr Gyozalyan | 15 | 3 | 6+4 | 1 | 0 | 0 | 1 | 0 | 2+2 | 2 |
| | MF | (Armenia) ARM | Aram Hovsepyan | 3 | 0 | 1 | 0 | 1 | 0 | 1 | 0 | 0 | 0 |

=== Goal scorers ===
| Place | Position | Nation | Number | Name | Premier League | Armenian Cup | Supercup | UEFA Champions League | Total |
|---|---|---|---|---|---|---|---|---|---|
| 1 | FW | (Armenia) | 7 | Mihran Manasyan | 13 | 0 | 0 | 0 | 13 |
| 2 | DF | (Armenia) | 17 | Artak Yedigaryan | 13 | 0 | 0 | 0 | 13 |
| 3 | MF | (Armenia) | 9 | Artak Dashyan | 6 | 0 | 0 | 0 | 6 |
| 3 | MF | (Armenia) | 20 | Artur Yedigaryan | 4 | 0 | 1 | 1 | 6 |
| 5 | MF | (Serbia) | 15 | Uroš Nenadović | 4 | 0 | 0 | 0 | 4 |
| 5 | DF | (Armenia) | 19 | Vahagn Minasyan | 3 | 0 | 0 | 1 | 4 |
| 5 | MF | (Armenia) | 17 | Own goal | 4 | 0 | 0 | 0 | 4 |
| 8 | MF | (Armenia) | 22 | Zaven Badoyan | 3 | 0 | 0 | 0 | 3 |
| 8 | FW | (Ukraine) | 12 | Yuriy Fomenko | 2 | 1 | 0 | 0 | 3 |
| 8 | FW | (Armenia) | 22 | Norayr Gyozalyan | 1 | 0 | 0 | 2 | 3 |
| 11 | MF | (Georgia (country)) | 11 | Irakli Kvekveskiri | 1 | 0 | 0 | 0 | 1 |
| 11 | MF | (Armenia) | 10 | Khoren Veranyan | 1 | 0 | 0 | 0 | 1 |
| 11 | MF | (Armenia) | 21 | Artak Grigoryan | 1 | 0 | 0 | 0 | 1 |
| 11 | DF | (Armenia) | 6 | Ararat Arakelyan | 1 | 0 | 0 | 0 | 1 |
| 11 | FW | (Armenia) | | Narek Beglaryan | 1 | 0 | 0 | 0 | 1 |
| 11 | FW | (Armenia) | | Gevorg Nranyan | 1 | 0 | 0 | 0 | 1 |
| | | | | TOTALS | 59 | 1 | 1 | 4 | 65 |

=== Clean sheets ===
| Place | Position | Nation | Number | Name | Premier League | Armenian Cup | Supercup | UEFA Champions League | Total |
|---|---|---|---|---|---|---|---|---|---|
| 1 | GK | (Armenia) | 92 | Arsen Beglaryan | 10 | 0 | 0 | 0 | 10 |
| 2 | GK | (Armenia) | 1 | Gevorg Kasparov | 4 | 0 | 0 | 2 | 6 |
| | | | | TOTALS | 14 | 0 | 0 | 2 | 16 |

=== Disciplinary record ===
| Number | Nation | Position | Name | Premier League | | Armenian Cup | | Supercup | | UEFA Champions League | | Total | |
| Number | Nation | Position | Name | Yellow card | Red card | Yellow card | Red card | Yellow card | Red card | Yellow card | Red card | Yellow card | Red card |
| 2 | (Ukraine) | DF | Dmytro Khovbosha | 5 | 0 | 1 | 0 | 0 | 0 | 0 | 0 | 6 | 0 |
| 3 | (Armenia) | DF | Andranik Voskanyan | 5 | 1 | 1 | 0 | 0 | 0 | 0 | 0 | 6 | 1 |
| 4 | (Serbia) | DF | Sasa Filipović | 1 | 0 | 0 | 0 | 0 | 0 | 0 | 0 | 1 | 0 |
| 6 | (Armenia) | DF | Ararat Arakelyan | 0 | 0 | 0 | 0 | 1 | 0 | 0 | 0 | 1 | 0 |
| 7 | (Armenia) | FW | Mihran Manasyan | 4 | 0 | 0 | 0 | 0 | 0 | 0 | 1 | 4 | 1 |
| 8 | (Armenia) | DF | Gagik Daghbashyan | 4 | 0 | 0 | 0 | 0 | 0 | 0 | 0 | 4 | 0 |
| 10 | (Armenia) | MF | Khoren Veranyan | 3 | 0 | 0 | 0 | 0 | 0 | 0 | 0 | 3 | 0 |
| 11 | (Georgia (country)) | MF | Irakli Kvekveskiri | 5 | 0 | 2 | 0 | 0 | 0 | 1 | 0 | 8 | 0 |
| 13 | (Armenia) | MF | Benik Hovhannisyan | 1 | 0 | 0 | 0 | 0 | 0 | 0 | 0 | 1 | 0 |
| 17 | (Armenia) | DF | Artak Yedigaryan | 3 | 0 | 0 | 0 | 1 | 0 | 0 | 0 | 4 | 0 |
| 19 | (Armenia) | DF | Vahagn Minasyan | 6 | 0 | 0 | 0 | 0 | 0 | 1 | 0 | 7 | 0 |
| 20 | (Armenia) | MF | Artur Yedigaryan | 5 | 0 | 1 | 0 | 0 | 0 | 1 | 0 | 7 | 0 |
| 21 | (Armenia) | MF | Artak Grigoryan | 5 | 0 | 0 | 0 | 0 | 0 | 1 | 0 | 6 | 0 |
| 77 | (Trinidad and Tobago) | FW | Lester Peltier | 1 | 0 | 0 | 0 | 0 | 0 | 0 | 0 | 1 | 0 |
| 93 | (Armenia) | GK | Arsen Beglaryan | 4 | 0 | 0 | 0 | 0 | 0 | 0 | 0 | 4 | 0 |
Players who left Alashkert during the season:
| 4 | (Serbia) | DF | Aleksandar Tasić | 3 | 0 | 1 | 0 | 0 | 0 | 1 | 0 | 5 | 0 |
| 5 | (Armenia) | MF | Karen Muradyan | 2 | 0 | 0 | 0 | 0 | 0 | 0 | 0 | 2 | 0 |
| 11 | (Armenia) | FW | Arsen Balabekyan | 0 | 0 | 0 | 0 | 1 | 0 | 0 | 0 | 1 | 0 |
| 12 | (Ukraine) | FW | Yuriy Fomenko | 1 | 0 | 1 | 0 | 0 | 0 | 0 | 0 | 2 | 0 |
| 13 | (Armenia) | DF | Gevorg Poghosyan | 0 | 0 | 0 | 0 | 0 | 0 | 1 | 0 | 1 | 0 |
| 14 | (Armenia) | DF | Aram Bareghamyan | 0 | 0 | 0 | 0 | 0 | 0 | 1 | 0 | 1 | 0 |
| 22 | (Armenia) | FW | Norayr Gyozalyan | 1 | 0 | 0 | 0 | 0 | 0 | 0 | 0 | 1 | 0 |
| | | | TOTALS | 59 | 1 | 7 | 0 | 3 | 0 | 7 | 1 | 76 | 2 |
