= 2016–17 FC Pyunik season =

Pyunik
2016-17 season
- Chairman: Rafik Hayrapetyan
- Manager: Artak Oseyan
- Stadium: Vazgen Sargsyan Republican Stadium
- Premier League: 4th
- Armenian Cup: Runners Up
- Europa League: First qualifying round vs Europa

The 2016–17 season was Pyunik's 23rd season in the Armenian Premier League.

== Squad ==
Note: Flags indicate national team as defined under FIFA eligibility rules; some limited exceptions apply. Players may hold more than one non-FIFA nationality.

No.	Pos.	Nation	Player
2	DF	ARM	Serob Grigoryan
3	DF	ARM	Artur Kartashyan
4	DF	ARM	Aram Shakhnazaryan
5	DF	ARM	Armen Manucharyan
6	MF	ARM	Narek Aslanyan
7	MF	ARM	Petros Avetisyan
8	MF	ARM	Armen Nahapetyan
9	FW	ARM	Razmik Hakobyan
10	FW	ARM	Vardan Pogosyan
11	FW	ARM	Erik Petrosyan
12	GK	ARM	Gor Manukyan
13	GK	ARM	Valeriy Voskonyan

No.	Pos.	Nation	Player
14	MF	ARM	Vigen Begoyan
15	MF	ARM	Erik Vardanyan
16	DF	ARM	Robert Hakobyan
17	MF	ARM	Hovhannes Poghosyan
18	MF	ARM	Artur Nadiryan
19	DF	ARM	Hovhannes Nazaryan
20	MF	ARM	Samvel Spertsyan
23	MF	ARM	Hovhannes Harutyunyan
26	MF	ARM	Alik Arakelyan
27	FW	ARM	Robert Minasyan
30	MF	ARM	Vahagn Hayrapetyan
33	FW	RUS	Gevorg Arutyunyan (loan from Rubin-2 Kazan)

== Transfers ==
=== In ===
Date	Position	Nationality	Name	From	Fee	Ref.
Winter 2017	FW	(Armenia)	Petros Avetisyan	Banants	Undisclosed	

=== Loans in ===
Date from	Position	Nationality	Name	From	Date to	Ref.
Summer 2016	FW	(Armenia)	Petros Avetisyan	Banants	Winter 2017	
Winter 2017	FW	(Russia)	Gevorg Arutyunyan	Rubin-2 Kazan	End of Season	

=== Out ===
Date	Position	Nationality	Name	To	Fee	Ref.
Summer 2016	GK	(Armenia)	Anatoly Ayvazov	Shirak	Undisclosed	
Summer 2016	DF	(Armenia)	Taron Voskanyan	Karmiotissa	Undisclosed	
Summer 2016	MF	(Armenia)	Karen Harutyunyan	Terengganu	Undisclosed	
Summer 2016	MF	(Armenia)	David Manoyan	Karmiotissa	Undisclosed	
Summer 2016	MF	(Armenia)	Vardges Satumyan	Banants	Undisclosed	
Summer 2016	MF	(Armenia)	Artur Yuspashyan	Anagennisi Deryneia	Undisclosed	
Summer 2016	FW	(Armenia)	Hovhannes Hovhannisyan	Gandzasar Kapan	Undisclosed	
13 June 2016	DF	(Armenia)	Varazdat Haroyan	Padideh	Undisclosed	
21 June 2016	DF	(Armenia)	Levon Hayrapetyan	Paykan	Undisclosed	
Winter 2017	MF	(Armenia)	Kamo Hovhannisyan	Torpedo-BelAZ Zhodino	Undisclosed	

=== Released ===
Date	Position	Nationality	Name	Joined	Date
Summer 2016	MF	(Armenia)	Sargis Shahinyan		

== Friendlies ==
14 February 2017	Pyunik (Armenia)	0 – 2	(Poland) Wigry Suwałki	Ayia Napa, Cyprus
(UTC+4)		Report	Goal

19 February 2017	Pyunik (Armenia)	2 – 2	(Russia) Krasnodar-2	Ayia Napa, Cyprus
(UTC+4)	Pogosyan; E.Petrosyan	Report	Goal

23 February 2017	Pyunik (Armenia)	3 – 3	(Russia) Lokomotiv-2 Moscow	Ayia Napa, Cyprus
(UTC+4)	Arakelyan; H.Nazaryan	Report	Goal

26 February 2017	Pyunik (Armenia)	0 – 2	(Latvia) RFS	Ayia Napa, Cyprus
(UTC+4)		Report	Goal

== Competitions ==
=== Overall record ===
Competition	First match	Last match	Starting round	Final position	Record							
Competition	First match	Last match	Starting round	Final position	Pld	W	D	L	GF	GA	GD	Win %
Premier League	6 August 2016	31 May 2017	Matchday 1	4th	30	12	9	9	35	27	+8	40.00
Armenian Cup	21 September 2016	24 May 2017	Quarterfinal	Runners Up	5	4	0	1	6	5	+1	80.00
UEFA Europa League	30 June 2016	7 July 2016	First qualifying round	First qualifying round	2	1	0	1	2	3	−1	50.00
Total					37	17	9	11	43	35	+8	45.95

Last updated: 31 May 2017
Source: Competitions

=== Premier League ===
==== Results ====
6 August 2016 1	Shirak	3 – 1	Pyunik	Gyumri
17:30 (UTC+4)	G. Hovhannisyan (yellow card) 16'; V.Ayvazyan 21', 45+1'; A.Davoyan (yellow card) 25' (yellow-red card) 81'; A.Hovhannisyan (yellow card) 60'; A.Tadevosyan (yellow card) 89'; A.Muradyan 90+4'	Summary	Manoyan 61' (pen.); Ra.Hakobyan (yellow card) 72'	Stadium: Gyumri City Stadium; Attendance: 1,000; Referee: Artur Safaryan

13 August 2016 2	Pyunik	1 – 2	Alashkert	Yerevan
19:00 (UTC+4)	A.Arakelyan 25'; Grigoryan (yellow card) 27'; A.Manucharyan (yellow card) 43'; Ra.Hakobyan (yellow card) 60'; Avetisyan (yellow card) 75'; H.Poghosyan (red card) 90+2'	Report	Arta.Yedigaryan 20'; A.Beglaryan (yellow card) 43'; B.Hovhannisyan (yellow card) 50'; M.Manasyan 62'; Grigoryan (yellow card) 81'	Stadium: Yerevan Football Academy Stadium; Attendance: 500; Referee: Artur Simonyan

21 August 2016 3	Pyunik	3 – 0	Gandzasar Kapan	Yerevan
19:00 (UTC+4)	A.Arakelyan 37', 90+6' (pen.); N.Aslanyan (yellow card) 49'; V.Hayrapetyan (yellow card) 52'; G.Manukyan (yellow card) 66'; E.Petrosyan 80'; H.Harutyunyan (yellow card) 90+2'	Report	Claudir (yellow card) 11'; Wbeymar (yellow card) 40'; A.Karapetyan (yellow card) 83'; G.Ohanyan (yellow card) 90'	Stadium: Yerevan Football Academy Stadium; Attendance: 800; Referee: Zaven Hovhannisyan

27 August 2016 4	Ararat Yerevan	0 – 0	Pyunik	Yerevan
19:00 (UTC+4)	K.Brou (yellow card) 24'	Report	A.Kartashyan (yellow card) 27'; V.Hayrapetyan (yellow card) 65'	Stadium: Vazgen Sargsyan Republican Stadium; Attendance: 250; Referee: Artur Safaryan

11 September 2016 5	Pyunik	2 – 1	Banants	Yerevan
19:00 (UTC+4)	V.Pogosyan 31'; A.Arakelyan (yellow card) 45'; A.Manucharyan (yellow card) 48'; A.Shakhnazaryan (yellow card) 59'; E.Petrosyan 90+1'	Report	Torrejón (yellow card) 56'; Burayev (yellow card) 59'; H. Hakobyan (yellow card) 67'; Drobarov 69'; Laércio (yellow card) 77'	Stadium: Yerevan Football Academy Stadium; Attendance: 500; Referee: Artur Safaryan

18 September 2016 6	Pyunik	0 – 0	Shirak	Yerevan
18:00 (UTC+4)		Report	M.Kaba (yellow card) 42'; A.Davoyan (yellow card) 77'; A.Mikaelyan (yellow card) 90+1'	Stadium: Yerevan Football Academy Stadium; Attendance: 500; Referee: Zaven Hovhannisyan

27 September 2016 7	Alashkert	0 – 0	Pyunik	Yerevan
16:00 (UTC+4)	Kvekveskiri (yellow card) 19'; Muradyan (yellow card) 29'	Report	V.Pogosyan (yellow card) 64'	Stadium: Alashkert Stadium; Attendance: 400; Referee: Suren Baliyan

1 October 2016 8	Gandzasar Kapan	1 – 0	Pyunik	Kapan
16:00 (UTC+4)	Ishkhanyan 12' (yellow card) 24'; Al.Petrosyan (yellow card) 40'; H.Asoyan (yellow card) 73' (yellow-red card) 88'	Report	V.Hayrapetyan (yellow card) 28'	Stadium: Gandzasar Stadium; Attendance: 400; Referee: Suren Baliyan

15 October 2016 9	Pyunik	4 – 0	Ararat Yerevan	Yerevan
18:00 (UTC+4)	V.Pogosyan 26', 33'; P.Avetisyan 36'; A.Manucharyan (yellow card) 44'; Hovhannisyan 75'	Report	D.Markosyan (yellow card) 49'	Stadium: Yerevan Football Academy Stadium; Attendance: 300; Referee: Artur Safaryan

23 October 2016 10	Banants	0 – 1	Pyunik	Yerevan
15:00 (UTC+4)	Adams (yellow card) 34'; H. Hakobyan (yellow card) 45'; Torrejón (yellow card) 75'	Report	A.Shakhnazaryan 27'; Grigoryan (yellow card) 57'; Avetisyan (yellow card) 75'	Stadium: Banants Stadium; Attendance: 1,000; Referee: Artur Safaryan

26 October 2016 11	Shirak	0 – 1	Pyunik	Gyumri
15:00 (UTC+4)	Hovsepyan (yellow card) 83'	Report	A.Kartashyan 41'	Stadium: Gyumri City Stadium; Attendance: 200; Referee: Artur Simonyan

30 October 2016 12	Pyunik	2 – 1	Alashkert	Yerevan
16:00 (UTC+4)	A.Kartashyan (yellow card) 17'; A.Manucharyan 30'; Grigoryan (yellow card) 43'; V.Pogosyan 48' (pen.); N.Aslanyan (yellow card) 81'	Report	Arta.Yedigaryan 69'	Stadium: Yerevan Football Academy Stadium; Attendance: 400; Referee: Zaven Hovhannisyan

5 November 2016 13	Pyunik	0 – 0	Gandzasar Kapan	Yerevan
17:00 (UTC+4)	Hovhannisyan (yellow card) 90+1'	Report	Musonda (yellow card) 33'; H.Asoyan (yellow card) 41'; Al.Petrosyan (yellow card) 45'	Stadium: Yerevan Football Academy Stadium; Attendance: 300; Referee: Suren Baliyan

19 November 2016 14	Ararat Yerevan	1 – 2	Pyunik	Yerevan
16:00 (UTC+4)	M.Sahakyan (yellow card) 50'; S.Mkrtchyan 90+2'	Report	H.Poghosyan (yellow card) 65'; A.Arakelyan 77'; Ra.Hakobyan (yellow card) 83'; A.Manucharyan 90+3'	Stadium: Vazgen Sargsyan Republican Stadium; Attendance: 200; Referee: Zaven Hovhannisyan

22 November 2016 15	Pyunik	1 – 1	Banants	Yerevan
16:00 (UTC+4)	Hovhannisyan 10'	Report	H.Ilangyozyan 66'; E.Vardanyan (yellow card) 77'	Stadium: Yerevan Football Academy Stadium; Attendance: 200; Referee: Artur Simonyan

26 November 2016 16	Pyunik	0 – 2	Shirak	Yerevan
16:00 (UTC+4)	Grigoryan (yellow card) 13'; P.Avetisyan (yellow card) 45'	Report	V.Ayvazyan 11', 71'; G. Hovhannisyan (yellow card) 20'; Gogichayev (yellow card) 49' de la Fuente (yellow card) 54'; Udo (yellow card) 89'	Stadium: Yerevan Football Academy Stadium; Attendance: 300; Referee: Suren Baliyan

4 December 2016 17	Alashkert	0 – 0	Pyunik	Yerevan
14:00 (UTC+4)	Tasić (yellow card) 22'; Artu.Yedigaryan (yellow card) 55'	Report	R.Hakobyan (yellow card) 54'	Stadium: Alashkert Stadium; Attendance: 700; Referee: Zaven Hovhannisyan

5 March 2017 18	Gandzasar Kapan	2 – 0	Pyunik	Yerevan
14:00 (UTC+4)	Claudir 5'; Wal (yellow card) 10'; G.Harutyunyan 12'	Report	A.Nadiryan (yellow card) 27'	Stadium: Vazgen Sargsyan Republican Stadium; Attendance: 50; Referee: Zaven Hovhannisyan

10 March 2017 19	Pyunik	3 – 0	Ararat Yerevan	Yerevan
16:00 (UTC+4)	Arutyunyan 10'; Grigoryan (yellow card) 53'; V.Pogosyan (yellow card) 62'; R.Hakobyan 66'; A.Nadiryan 78'	Report	Gareginyan (yellow card) 40'; A.Stefanyan (yellow card) 73'	Stadium: Yerevan Football Academy Stadium; Attendance: 700; Referee: Artur Simonyan

19 March 2017 20	Banants	0 – 3	Pyunik	Yerevan
14:00 (UTC+4)	Adams (yellow card) 37'	Report	A.Manucharyan (yellow card) 4'; V.Hayrapetyan 24'; V.Pogosyan 45+3' (pen.); A.Nahapetyan 78'	Stadium: Banants Stadium; Attendance: 1,000; Referee: Zaven Hovhannisyan

1 April 2017 21	Shirak	0 – 2	Pyunik	Gyumri
15:00 (UTC+4)	G. Hovhannisyan (yellow card) 6'; A.Davoyan (yellow card) 41'; A.Hovhannisyan (yellow card) 56'; Hovsepyan (yellow card) 68'; Safiu (yellow card) 90+3'	Report	A.Kartashyan 37'; P.Avetisyan 39' (pen.) (yellow card) 43'	Stadium: Gyumri City Stadium; Attendance: 500; Referee: Artur Simonyan

7 April 2017 22	Pyunik	0 – 3	Alashkert	Yerevan
16:00 (UTC+4)	Grigoryan (yellow card) 79'	Report	Voskanyan (yellow card) 23'; K.Veranyan (yellow card) 31'; Nenadović 39'; Minasyan 63'; Khovbosha (yellow card) 63'; A.Beglaryan (yellow card) 83'; Arta.Yedigaryan 89' (pen.)	Stadium: Yerevan Football Academy Stadium; Attendance: 300; Referee: Suren Baliyan

16 April 2017 23	Pyunik	1 – 2	Gandzasar Kapan	Yerevan
16:00 (UTC+4)	A.Kartashyan (yellow card) 5' (goal) 90+3'; V.Hayrapetyan (yellow card) 46'; N.Aslanyan (yellow card) 63'; A.Shakhnazaryan (yellow card) 73'; P.Avetisyan (yellow card) 84'	Report	Musonda 40' (yellow card) 73'; Yuspashyan (yellow card) 49'; A.Khachatryan 59' (pen.); Wbeymar (yellow card) 82'	Stadium: Yerevan Football Academy Stadium; Attendance: 300; Referee: Zaven Hovhannisyan

21 April 2017 24	Ararat Yerevan	1 – 0	Pyunik	Yerevan
17:00 (UTC+4)	R.Safaryan (yellow card) 41'; G.Tumbaryan 58'	Report	Ra.Hakobyan (yellow card) 56'; H.Harutyunyan (yellow card) 69'	Stadium: Banants-3; Attendance: 300; Referee: Gevorg Eghoyan

30 April 2017 25	Pyunik	0 – 0	Banants	Yerevan
19:00 (UTC+4)	A.Shakhnazaryan (yellow card) 56'; A.Nadiryan (yellow card) 80'	Report	K.Melkonyan (yellow card) 82'	Stadium: Yerevan Football Academy Stadium; Attendance: 500; Referee: Artur Safaryan

6 May 2017 26	Pyunik	0 – 2	Shirak	Yerevan
16:00 (UTC+4)	Arutyunyan (yellow card) 83'	Report	Hovsepyan (yellow card) 29'; V.Ayvazyan 65'; Datsenko (yellow card) 89'; Poghosyan 90+2'	Stadium: Yerevan Football Academy Stadium; Attendance: 300; Referee: Artur Simonyan

13 May 2017 27	Alashkert	3 – 3	Pyunik	Yerevan
17:00 (UTC+4)	Badoyan 13'; Dashyan 50', 59' (pen.)	Report	A.Kartashyan 37'; V.Pogosyan 38' (yellow card) 84'; N.Aslanyan 48'	Stadium: Alashkert Stadium; Attendance: 400; Referee: Zaven Hovhannisyan

20 May 2017 28	Gandzasar Kapan	1 – 1	Pyunik	Yerevan
19:00 (UTC+4)	G.Harutyunyan 44'; Wbeymar (yellow card) 55'; Yuspashyan (yellow card) 89'	Report	ANadiryan (yellow card) 6'; A.Arakelyan 72'	Stadium: Vazgen Sargsyan Republican Stadium; Attendance: 300; Referee: Suren Baliyan

27 May 2017 29	Pyunik	2 – 1	Ararat Yerevan	Yerevan
17:00 (UTC+4)	H.Harutyunyan 73', 88'; R.Minasyan (yellow card) 90'; N.Aslanyan (yellow card) 90+5'	Report	G.Tumbaryan 34' (yellow card) 56'; S.Mkrtchyan (yellow card) 40'; S.Metoyan (yellow card) 72'; Go.Poghosyan (yellow card) 87'; A.Petrosyan (yellow card) 89'	Stadium: Yerevan Football Academy Stadium; Attendance: 200; Referee: Artur Simonyan

31 May 2017 30	Banants	0 – 2	Pyunik	Yerevan
17:00 (UTC+4)	H.Voskanyan (yellow card) 62'	Report	V.Pogosyan (yellow card) 20'; S.Spertsyan 39' (yellow card) 42'; N.Aslanyan (yellow card) 45'; Vardanyan (yellow card) 63'; V.Begoyan 76'	Stadium: Banants Stadium; Attendance: 500; Referee: Suren Baliyan

==== Table ====
Pos	Team	Pld	W	D	L	GF	GA	GD	Pts	Qualification
1	Alashkert (C)	30	19	7	4	59	26	+33	64	Qualification for the Champions League first qualifying round
2	Gandzasar Kapan	30	17	6	7	38	24	+14	57	Qualification for the Europa League first qualifying round (Note: Shirak qualified for Europa League first qualifying round by winning the 2016–17 Armenian Cup. However, since they already qualified for European competition based on their league position, the spot awarded to the cup winners was passed down the league.)
3	Shirak	30	16	5	9	31	24	+7	53	Qualification for the Europa League first qualifying round
4	Pyunik	30	12	9	9	35	27	+8	45	Qualification for the Europa League first qualifying round
5	Banants	30	5	6	19	18	44	−26	21	
6	Ararat Yerevan	30	3	3	24	17	53	−36	12	

Source: Football Federation of Armenia (in Armenian), Soccerway
Rules for classification: 1) Points; 2) Play-off (only if deciding champion); 3) Matches won; 4) Head-to-head points; 5) Head-to-head matches won; 6) Head-to-head goal difference; 7) Head-to-head goals scored; 8) Head-to-head away goals scored; 9) Goal difference; 10) Goals scored.
(C) Champions

=== Armenian Cup ===
21 September 2016 Quarterfinal 1st leg	Alashkert	1 – 2	Pyunik	Yerevan
16:00 (UTC+4)	Voskanyan (yellow card) 2'; Fomenko (yellow card) 43' (goal) 47'; Kvekveskiri (yellow card) 77'; Artu.Yedigaryan (yellow card) 86'	Report	A.Arakelyan 4'; Hovhannisyan 13' (yellow card) 61'; A.Manucharyan (yellow card) 81'	Stadium: Alashkert Stadium; Attendance: 600; Referee: Artur Simonyan

19 October 2016 Quarterfinal 2nd leg	Pyunik	1 – 0 (3 – 1 agg.)	Alashkert	Yerevan
18:00 (UTC+4)	Hovhannisyan (yellow card) 45' (goal) 87'	Report	Tasić (yellow card) 16'; Khovbosha (yellow card) 25'; Kvekveskiri (yellow card) 45'	Stadium: Yerevan Football Academy Stadium; Attendance: 300; Referee: Artur Simonyan

11 April 2017 Semifinal 1st leg	Pyunik	2 – 1	Banants	Yerevan
16:00 (UTC+4)	P.Avetisyan 36'; A.Bareghamyan 52' (o.g.); N.Aslanyan (yellow card) 83'; V.Voskonyan (yellow card) 90+1'	Report	Injac 28'; Adams (yellow card) 30'; V.Ayvazyan (yellow card) 60'	Stadium: Yerevan Football Academy Stadium; Attendance: 200; Referee: Artur Simonyan

25 April 2017 Semifinal 2nd leg	Banants	0 – 1 (1 – 3 agg.)	Pyunik	Yerevan
16:00 (UTC+4)	Injac (yellow card) 14'; V.Ayvazyan (yellow card) 56'; V.Drobarov (yellow card) 63'; E.Yeghiazaryan (yellow card) 76' (yellow-red card) 78'	Report	A.Manucharyan (yellow card) 18'; A.Kartashyan (yellow card) 45+2'; A.Shakhnazaryan 50'	Stadium: Banants Stadium; Attendance: 1,000; Referee: Suren Baliyan

==== Final ====
24 May 2017	Shirak	3 – 0	Pyunik	Yerevan
19:00 (UTC+4)	Nwabueze 6', 38'; V.Bichakhchyan 28'; V.Ayvazyan (yellow card) 89'	Report	V.Pogosyan (yellow card) 65'	Stadium: Vazgen Sargsyan Republican Stadium; Attendance: 2,000; Referee: Zaven Hovhannisyan

=== UEFA Europa League ===
==== Qualifying rounds ====
30 June 2016 First qualifying round 1st leg	Europa (Gibraltar)	2 – 0	(Armenia) Pyunik	Gibraltar
20:30 (UTC+4)	Carrión 32'; López 39'	Report	Arakelyan (yellow card) 23'; Grigoryan (yellow card) 29' (yellow-red card) 79'; Manoyan (yellow card) 67'	Stadium: Victoria Stadium; Attendance: 850; Referee: Markus Hameter (Austria)

7 July 2016 First qualifying round 2nd leg	Pyunik (Armenia)	2 – 1 (2 – 3 agg.)	(Gibraltar) Europa	Yerevan, Armenia
19:00 (UTC+4)	Arakelyan 25'; Ra.Hakobyan 56'; Ro.Hakobyan (yellow card) 68'; A.Kartashyan (yellow card) 80'	Report	Joselinho 10'; Toni (yellow card) 68'; Quillo (yellow card) 88'	Stadium: Vazgen Sargsyan Republican Stadium (Note: Pyunik played their home match at Vazgen Sargsyan Republican Stadium, Yerevan, instead of their regular stadium Football Academy Stadium, Yerevan.); Attendance: 2,000; Referee: Boris Marhefka (Slovakia)

== Statistics ==
As of match played 31 May 2017

=== Appearances and goals ===
No.	Pos	Nat	Player	Total		Premier League		Armenian Cup		UEFA Europa League	
No.	Pos	Nat	Player	Apps	Goals	Apps	Goals	Apps	Goals	Apps	Goals
2	DF	(Armenia) ARM	Serob Grigoryan	34	0	28	0	5	0	1	0
3	DF	(Armenia) ARM	Artur Kartashyan	35	4	28	4	5	0	2	0
4	DF	(Armenia) ARM	Aram Shakhnazaryan	31	2	24+3	1	4	1	0	0
5	DF	(Armenia) ARM	Armen Manucharyan	36	2	27+3	2	4	0	2	0
6	MF	(Armenia) ARM	Narek Aslanyan	32	1	23+3	1	5	0	0+1	0
7	MF	(Armenia) ARM	Petros Avetisyan	21	2	15+2	1	3+1	1	0	0
8	MF	(Armenia) ARM	Armen Nahapetyan	12	1	0+10	1	0+2	0	0	0
9	FW	(Armenia) ARM	Razmik Hakobyan	23	1	16+3	1	2	0	1+1	0
10	FW	(Armenia) ARM	Vardan Pogosyan	32	6	26+1	6	5	0	0	0
11	FW	(Armenia) ARM	Erik Petrosyan	30	2	3+21	2	0+5	0	0+1	0
12	GK	(Armenia) ARM	Gor Manukyan	17	0	13	0	2	0	2	0
13	GK	(Armenia) ARM	Valeriy Voskonyan	20	0	17	0	3	0	0	0
14	MF	(Armenia) ARM	Vigen Begoyan	3	1	0+3	1	0	0	0	0
15	MF	(Armenia) ARM	Erik Vardanyan	11	0	4+6	0	0+1	0	0	0
16	DF	(Armenia) ARM	Robert Hakobyan	19	0	9+6	0	1+2	0	1	0
17	MF	(Armenia) ARM	Hovhannes Poghosyan	18	0	15+1	0	2	0	0	0
18	MF	(Armenia) ARM	Artur Nadiryan	14	1	5+6	1	1+2	0	0	0
19	DF	(Armenia) ARM	Hovhannes Nazaryan	2	0	1+1	0	0	0	0	0
20	MF	(Armenia) ARM	Samvel Spertsyan	6	1	3+3	1	0	0	0	0
23	MF	(Armenia) ARM	Hovhannes Harutyunyan	26	2	3+17	2	0+4	0	1+1	0
26	MF	(Armenia) ARM	Alik Arakelyan	34	6	24+3	5	3+2	1	2	0
27	FW	(Armenia) ARM	Robert Minasyan	7	0	5	0	0	0	1+1	0
30	MF	(Armenia) ARM	Vahagn Hayrapetyan	30	1	20+5	1	5	0	0	0
33	FW	(Russia) RUS	Gevorg Arutyunyan	16	1	10+3	1	3	0	0	0
Players who left Pyunik during the season:
7	MF	(Armenia) ARM	Kamo Hovhannisyan	18	4	10+4	2	2	2	2	0
8	MF	(Armenia) ARM	Hovhannes Panosyan	3	0	0+2	0	0	0	1	0
11	MF	(Armenia) ARM	David Manoyan	3	1	1	1	0	0	2	0
15	MF	(Armenia) ARM	Artur Yuspashyan	2	0	0	0	0	0	2	0
30	MF	(Armenia) ARM	Vardges Satumyan	2	0	0	0	0	0	1+1	0
33	DF	(Armenia) ARM	Taron Voskanyan	1	0	0	0	0	0	1	0

=== Goal scorers ===
Place	Position	Nation	Number	Name	Premier League	Armenian Cup	Europa League	Total
1	MF	(Armenia)	26	Alik Arakelyan	5	1	1	7
2	FW	(Armenia)	10	Vardan Pogosyan	6	0	0	6
3	DF	(Armenia)	3	Artur Kartashyan	4	0	0	4
3	MF	(Armenia)	7	Kamo Hovhannisyan	2	2	0	4
5	DF	(Armenia)	5	Armen Manucharyan	2	0	0	2
5	MF	(Armenia)	23	Hovhannes Harutyunyan	2	0	0	2
5	FW	(Armenia)	11	Erik Petrosyan	2	0	0	2
5	MF	(Armenia)	7	Petros Avetisyan	1	1	0	2
5	DF	(Armenia)	4	Aram Shakhnazaryan	1	1	0	2
5	FW	(Armenia)	9	Razmik Hakobyan	1	0	1	2
5				Own goal	1	1	0	2
12	MF	(Armenia)	11	David Manoyan	1	0	0	1
12	MF	(Armenia)	6	Narek Aslanyan	1	0	0	1
12	MF	(Armenia)	30	Vahagn Hayrapetyan	1	0	0	1
12	MF	(Armenia)	18	Artur Nadiryan	1	0	0	1
12	MF	(Armenia)	8	Armen Nahapetyan	1	0	0	1
12	MF	(Armenia)	20	Samvel Spertsyan	1	0	0	1
12	MF	(Armenia)	14	Vigen Begoyan	1	0	0	1
12	FW	(Russia)	33	Gevorg Arutyunyan	1	0	0	1
				TOTALS	35	6	2	43

=== Clean sheets ===
Place	Position	Nation	Number	Name	Premier League	Armenian Cup	Europa League	Total
1	GK	(Armenia)	12	Gor Manukyan	7	1	0	8
1	GK	(Armenia)	13	Valeriy Voskonyan	6	1	0	7
				TOTALS	13	2	0	15

=== Disciplinary record ===
Number	Nation	Position	Name	Premier League		Armenian Cup		UEFA Europa League		Total	
Number	Nation	Position	Name	Yellow card	Red card	Yellow card	Red card	Yellow card	Red card	Yellow card	Red card
2	(Armenia)	DF	Serob Grigoryan	6	0	0	0	2	1	8	1
3	(Armenia)	DF	Artur Kartashyan	3	0	1	0	1	0	5	0
4	(Armenia)	DF	Aram Shakhnazaryan	3	0	0	0	0	0	3	0
5	(Armenia)	DF	Armen Manucharyan	4	0	2	0	0	0	6	0
6	(Armenia)	MF	Narek Aslanyan	5	0	1	0	0	0	6	0
7	(Armenia)	MF	Petros Avetisyan	3	0	0	0	0	0	3	0
9	(Armenia)	FW	Razmik Hakobyan	5	0	0	0	0	0	5	0
10	(Armenia)	FW	Vardan Pogosyan	4	0	1	0	0	0	5	0
12	(Armenia)	GK	Gor Manukyan	1	0	0	0	0	0	1	0
13	(Armenia)	GK	Valeriy Voskonyan	0	0	1	0	0	0	1	0
15	(Armenia)	MF	Erik Vardanyan	1	0	0	0	0	0	1	0
16	(Armenia)	DF	Robert Hakobyan	0	0	0	0	1	0	1	0
17	(Armenia)	MF	Hovhannes Poghosyan	1	1	0	0	0	0	1	1
18	(Armenia)	MF	Artur Nadiryan	3	0	0	0	0	0	3	0
20	(Armenia)	MF	Samvel Spertsyan	1	0	0	0	0	0	1	0
23	(Armenia)	MF	Hovhannes Harutyunyan	2	0	0	0	0	0	2	0
26	(Armenia)	MF	Alik Arakelyan	1	0	0	0	1	0	2	0
27	(Armenia)	FW	Robert Minasyan	1	0	0	0	0	0	1	0
30	(Armenia)	MF	Vahagn Hayrapetyan	4	0	0	0	0	0	4	0
33	(Russia)	FW	Gevorg Arutyunyan	1	0	0	0	0	0	1	0
Players who left Pyunik during the season:
7	(Armenia)	MF	Kamo Hovhannisyan	1	0	2	0	0	0	3	0
11	(Armenia)	MF	David Manoyan	0	0	0	0	1	0	1	0
			TOTALS	50	1	8	0	6	1	64	2
