= 2016–17 Armenian Cup =

Tournament details
- Country: Armenia
- Teams: 8

Final positions
- Champions: Shirak
- Runners-up: Pyunik

Tournament statistics
- Matches played: 10
- Goals scored: 18 (1.8 per match)
- Top goal scorer: Two Players (2)

The 2016–17 Armenian Cup is the 26th season of Armenia's football knockout competition. It features the six 2016–17 Premier League teams, plus Erebuni and Kotayk from the 2016–17 First Division. The tournament begins on 21 September 2016, with Banants the defending champions, having won their third title the previous season.

== Quarterfinals ==
| 9 October 2016 Match 1 1st leg | Gandzasar Kapan (1) | 3 – 0 (w/o) | Erebuni (2) | Kapan |
| (UTC+4) | | | | Stadium: Gandzasar Stadium |

| 18 October 2016 Match 1 2nd leg | Erebuni (2) | 0 – 3 (w/o) (0–6 agg.) | Gandzasar Kapan | Yerevan |
| (UTC+4) | | | | Stadium: Erebuni Stadium |

| 21 September 2016 Match 2 1st leg | Alashkert (1) | 1–2 | Pyunik (1) | Yerevan |
| 16:00 (UTC+4) | Voskanyan (yellow card) 2'; Fomenko (yellow card) 43' (goal) 47'; Kvekveskiri (yellow card) 77'; Artu.Yedigaryan (yellow card) 86' | Report | A.Arakelyan 4'; Hovhannisyan 13' (yellow card) 61'; A.Manucharyan (yellow card) 81' | Stadium: Alashkert Stadium; Attendance: 600; Referee: Artur Simonyan |

| 19 October 2016 Match 2 2nd leg | Pyunik (1) | 1–0 (3–1 agg.) | Alashkert (1) | Yerevan |
| 18:00 (UTC+4) | Hovhannisyan (yellow card) 45' (goal) 87' | Report | Tasić (yellow card) 16'; Khovbosha (yellow card) 25'; Kvekveskiri (yellow card) 45' | Stadium: Yerevan Football Academy Stadium; Attendance: 300; Referee: Artur Simonyan |

| 21 September 2016 Match 3 1st leg | Ararat Yerevan (1) | 1–2 | Banants (1) | Yerevan |
| 18:00 (UTC+4) | O.Kaina (yellow card) 47'; N.Kpehia 73'; S.Kone (yellow card) 77' | Report | O.Hambardzumyan 6'; E.Movsesyan 46' | Stadium: Vazgen Sargsyan Republican Stadium; Attendance: 100; Referee: Artur Safaryan |

| 18 October 2016 Match 3 2nd leg | Banants (1) | 0–1 ((a) 2 – 2 agg.) | Ararat Yerevan (1) | Yerevan |
| 15:00 (UTC+4) | Adams (yellow card) 37'; Burayev (yellow card) 45' | Report | V.Arzoyan (yellow card) 36'; G.Tumbaryan 63'; S.Metoyan (yellow card) 67'; A.Derdzyan (yellow card) 76' | Stadium: Banants Stadium; Attendance: 600; Referee: Artut Safaryan |

| 22 September 2016 Match 4 1st leg | Kotayk (2) | 0–0 | Shirak (1) | Abovyan |
| 16:00 (UTC+4) | A.Ghazaryan (yellow card) 35'; E.Mkrtchyan (yellow card) 89' | Report | | Stadium: Abovyan City Stadium; Attendance: 150; Referee: Shahen Aghayan |

| 19 October 2016 Match 4 2nd leg | Shirak (1) | 3 – 0 (w/o) (3–0 agg.) | Kotayk (2) | Gyumri |
| (UTC+4) | | | | Stadium: Gyumri City Stadium |

== Semifinals ==
The four winners from the Quarterfinals were drawn into two two-legged ties.

| 11 April 2017 Match 5 1st leg | Pyunik(1) | 2–1 | Banants (1) | Yerevan |
| (UTC+4) | P.Avetisyan 36'; A.Bareghamyan 52' (o.g.); N.Aslanyan (yellow card) 83'; V.Voskonyan (yellow card) 90+1' | Report | Injac 28'; Adams (yellow card) 30'; V.Ayvazyan (yellow card) 60' | Stadium: Yerevan Football Academy Stadium; Attendance: 200; Referee: Artur Simonyan |

| 25 April 2017 Match 5 2nd leg | Banants (1) | 0–1 (1–3 agg.) | Pyunik (1) | Yerevan |
| (UTC+4) | Injac (yellow card) 14'; V.Ayvazyan (yellow card) 56'; V.Drobarov (yellow card) 63'; E.Yeghiazaryan (yellow card) 76' (yellow-red card) 78' | Report | A.Manucharyan (yellow card) 18'; A.Kartashyan (yellow card) 45+2'; A.Shakhnazaryan 50' | Stadium: Banants Stadium; Attendance: 1,000; Referee: Suren Baliyan |

| 12 April 2017 Match 6 1st leg | Gandzasar Kapan (1) | 0–1 | Shirak(1) | Yerevan |
| 16:00 (UTC+4) | G.Harutyunyan (yellow card) 88' | Report | A.Davoyan (yellow card) 35'; O.Kaina 45'; Hovsepyan (yellow card) 85'; M.Bakayoko (yellow card) 88' | Stadium: Vazgen Sargsyan Republican Stadium; Attendance: 300; Referee: Zaven Hovhannisyan |

| 26 April 2017 Match 6 2nd leg | Shirak (1) | 1–1 (2–1 agg.) | Gandzasar Kapan (1) | Gyumri |
| 16:00 (UTC+4) | O.Kaina (yellow card) 20'; Safiu (yellow card) 44'; Prljević (yellow card) 64'; V.Minasyan 66' (o.g.); Yermakov (yellow card) 90+1'; Udo (yellow card) 90+3' | Report | Musonda 40' (pen.); Walmerson (yellow card) 84'; H.Ishkhanyan (yellow card) 90+3' | Stadium: Gyumri City Stadium; Attendance: 500; Referee: Zaven Hovhannisyan |

== Final ==
| 24 May 2017 Match 7 | Shirak (1) | 3–0 | Pyunik (1) | Yerevan |
| 19:00 (UTC+4) | Nwabueze 6', 38'; V.Bichakhchyan 28'; V.Ayvazyan (yellow card) 89' | Report | Poghosyan (yellow card) 65' | Stadium: Vazgen Sargsyan Republican Stadium; Attendance: 2,000; Referee: Zaven Hovhannisyan |

== Scorers ==
2 goals:

- (Armenia) Kamo Hovhannisyan – Pyunik
- (Nigeria) Kyrian Nwabueze – Shirak

1 goals:

- (Ukraine) Yuriy Fomenko – Alashkert
- (Armenia) Gegham Tumbaryan – Ararat Yerevan
- (Ivory Coast) Nassim Aaron Kpehia – Ararat Yerevan
- (Armenia) Orbeli Hambardzumyan – Banants
- (Armenia) Edgar Movsesyan – Banants
- (Serbia) Nenad Injac – Banants
- (Zambia) Lubambo Musonda – Gandzasar Kapan
- (Armenia) Alik Arakelyan – Pyunik
- (Armenia) Petros Avetisyan – Pyunik
- (Armenia) Aram Shakhnazaryan – Pyunik
- (Armenia) Vahan Bichakhchyan – Shirak
- (Cameroon) Oumarou Kaina – Shirak

Own goals:

- (Armenia) Aram Bareghamyan (11 April 2017 vs Pyunik)
- (Armenia) Vaspurak Minasyan (26 April 2017 vs Shirak)
