= Yedigaryan =

Yedigaryan (Armenian: Եդիգարյան) is an Armenian surname. Notable people with the surname include:

- Artak Yedigaryan (born 1990), Armenian footballer
- Artur Yedigaryan (born 1987), Armenian footballer
- Ashot Yedigaryan (born 1950), Armenian actor
- Iveta Yedigaryan (born 1981), Armenian actress and singer
