= Hiraç Yagan =

Armenian footballer

Personal information
- Full name: Hiraç Yagan
- Date of birth: 3 January 1989 (age 37)
- Place of birth: Etterbeek, Belgium
- Height: 1.78 m (5 ft 10 in)
- Position: Right back

Team information
- Current team: FC Stade Lausanne Ouchy (sporting director)

Youth career
- 2005–2006: Lierse S.K.
- 2006–2009: Standard Liège

Senior career*
Years	Team	Apps	(Gls)
2008–2011	Standard Liège	2	(1)
2010	→ Tubize (loan)	3	(0)
2011–2012	Charleroi Fleurus	9	(1)
2012	Gandzasar Kapan	12	(0)
2013–2014	Saint Gillis	29	(1)
2014–2015	FC Meyrin	7	(1)
2015–2017	Servette	2	(0)
2017–2019	Stade Nyonnais	31	(0)

International career
2009	Armenia U21	5	(1)
2009	Armenia	2	(0)
2016–	Western Armenia	9	(1)
- * Club domestic league appearances and goals

Hiraç Yagan (Armenian: Հրաչ Յագան, born 3 January 1989) is a retired football midfielder. Born in Belgium, he represented Armenia at international level. He is currently the sporting director of Stade Lausanne Ouchy.

== Club career ==
=== Standard Liège ===
Yagan began his career with Lierse S.K. and was scouted by Standard Liège in July 2006. He scored on his debut for Standard Liège against Tubize on 14 February 2009. In January 2010, he was loaned out to Tubize until July 2010.

== International career ==
=== Armenia U21 ===
Though born in Belgium, Yagan chose to represent his country of descent and was called up for Armenia U-21 on 17 April 2009, just three days later played his first international match here. He scored his first goal on his second game against Switzerland U-21 on 4 September 2009.

=== Armenia national team ===
He made his debut for Armenia against Moldova on 12 August 2009.

=== Western Armenia ===
Yagan has also turned out for Western Armenia, a team representing the Armenian indigenous people primarily from the region of Western Armenia which lays in today's Turkey.

== Management career ==
From 2017 to the end of 2019, Yagan was the president of Armenian club FC Ararat Yerevan.

Yagan retired at the end of the 2018–19 season and was appointed sporting director of FC Stade Nyonnais.

== Honours ==
Standard Liège

- Belgian First Division: 1

2008/09
