= Western Armenia national football team =

Unofficial national football team representing the region of Western Armenia

Western Armenia
- Nickname(s): The Highlanders; Լեռնաշխարհը
- Association: Football Federation of Western Armenia
- Confederation: Confederation of Independent Football Associations
- Head coach: Harutyun Vardanyan
- Top scorer: David Ghandilyan (5)
- FIFA code: n/a
First colours

First international
- Western Armenia 12–0 Chagos Islands (Sukhumi, Georgia; 30 May 2016)

Biggest win
- Western Armenia 12–0 Chagos Islands (Sukhumi, Georgia; 30 May 2016)

Biggest defeat
- Cascadia 4–0 Western Armenia (Hayes Lane, England; 7 June 2018)

ConIFA World Football Cup
- Appearances: 2 (first in 2016)
- Best result: Quarter-finals (2016, 2018)

The Western Armenia national football team (Armenian: Արեւմտյան Հայաստանի Ֆուտբոլի ազգային հավաքական, romanized: Arevmtyan Hayastani futbol azgayin havak'akan) is a football team representing the Armenians primarily from the historical region of Western Armenia, which is currently within the borders of Turkey.

== History ==
The governing body, the Football Federation of Western Armenia, was formed in 2015 and joined the Confederation of Independent Football Associations (ConIFA) on 1 June of that year. The team's first ever game was played on 6 January 2016, when a Western Armenia XI played against Olympique de Marseille (CFA), the reserve team of the leading French football club. Vahagn Militosyan scored both goals in a 3–2 defeat.

10 days after the team's first ever game, Western Armenia was selected at ConIFA's 3rd AGM to be one of the 12 participants in the 2016 ConIFA World Football Cup, to be held in Abkhazia in May and June. In the draw for the competition, the team was selected in Group A alongside the hosts and the Chagos Islands. Western Armenia's first full international, against the Chagos Islands, ended with the team inflicting a record 12–0 defeat on the Chagossians, before going down to a 1–0 defeat against Abkhazia in the final group game. This though was enough for the team to qualify for the quarter-finals where they played the Panjab football team.

== International matches ==
30 May 2016 ConIFA WFC Group A	Chagos Islands	0–12	Western Armenia	Dinamo Stadium, Sukhumi
20:00 GET		Report	3', 20', 30', 34', 45', 53' David Ghandilyan; 55' Tamaz Avolian; 58', 81' Armen Kapikiyan; 64' Ruslan Trapizoyan; 69' Vahagn Militosyan; 73' Hiraç Yagan

31 May 2016 ConIFA WFC Group A	Abkhazia	1–0	Western Armenia	Dinamo Stadium, Sukhumi
20:00 GET	Dmitri Kortava 9'

2 June 2016 ConIFA WFC Quarter-Final	Western Armenia	2–3	Panjab	Dinamo Stadium, Sukhumi
20:00 GET	Tamaz Avolian 67'; Raffi Kaya 79'		Amar Purewal 2', 36', 44'

3 June 2016 ConIFA WFC Placement R. 1	Kurdistan Region	0–0 (5–6 p)	Western Armenia	Dinamo Stadium, Sukhumi
20:00 GET
	Penalties
	Miran Khesro (penalty scored); Farhan Shakor (penalty scored); Hunar Ahmad (penalty missed); Farhang Wriya (penalty scored); Diyar Rahman (penalty scored); Aras Mustafa (penalty scored); Znar Faizi (?) (penalty missed)		(penalty scored) Hiraç Yagan; (penalty missed) Raffi Kaya; (penalty scored) Tamaz Avolian; (penalty scored) Loris Berberian; (penalty scored) Jules Tepelian; (penalty scored) Herant Yagan; (penalty scored) Denis Oz

4 June 2016 ConIFA WFC Placement R. 2	Sápmi	3–0	Western Armenia	Daur Akhvlediani Stadium, Gagra
15:00 GET

31 May 2018 ConIFA WFC Group D	United Koreans in Japan	0–0	Western Armenia	Colston Avenue, Carshalton
12:00 BST		Report		Referee: Fehim Dayı

2 June 2018 ConIFA WFC Group D	Panjab	0–1	Western Armenia	Arbour Park, Slough
17:00 BST		Report	Militosyan 14'	Referee: Kristian Michel

3 June 2018 ConIFA WFC Group D	Western Armenia	4–0	Kabylia	Queen Elizabeth II Stadium, Enfield
18:00 BST	Mosoyan 23'; Valenza-Berberian 61', 87'; Militosyan 89'	Report		Referee: Massimo Amitrano

5 June 2018 ConIFA WFC Quarter-Final	Western Armenia	0–4	Székely Land	Hayes Lane, Bromley
18:00 BST		Report	Tankó 36'; Csizmadia 61'; L. Fülöp 65'; Bajkó 86'	Referee: Givi Todua

7 June 2018 ConIFA WFC Placement R. 2	Cascadia	4–0	Western Armenia	Hayes Lane, Bromley
15:00 BST	Ferguson 24', 62'; Oldham 54'; Farkas 79'	Report		Referee: Ivan Mrkalj

9 June 2018 ConIFA WFC Placement R. 3	Barawa	0–7	Western Armenia	Coles Park, Haringey
15:00 BST		Report	N. Hovsepyan; D. Hovsepyan; Yedigaryan; Guzel; Varjabetyan; Militosyan; Mosoyan	Referee: Leon Dastych

2 June 2019 ConIFA EFC Group B	Western Armenia	1-2	South Ossetia	Avakyan Arena, Martuni
18:00	Aslanyan 79'		Gurtsiev 29', 56'	Attendance: 1,080; Referee: Ahmed Sabah Radha Ahmed

3 June 2019 ConIFA EFC Group B	Székely Land	0-5	Western Armenia	Askeran City Stadium, Askeran
16:00		Report	Badoyan 20'; Hovsepyan 52' (pen.); Bakalyan 70'; Minasyan 81'; Aslanyan 90+1'	Attendance: 500; Referee: Arkadi Akobyan

4 June 2019 ConIFA EFC Group B	Padania	1-1	Western Armenia	Stepanakert Republican Stadium, Stepanakert
20:00	Colombo 69'	Report	Yedigaryan 67'	Attendance: 6,000; Referee: Ahmed Sabah Radha Ahmed

6 June 2019 ConIFA EFC Semi-Final	Abkhazia	1–1 (0–3 p)	Western Armenia	Stepanakert Republican Stadium, Stepanakert
18:30	Khugayev 10'		Manoyan 32' (pen.)	Attendance: 7,000; Referee: Ivan Mrkalj

9 June 2019 ConIFA EFC Final	Western Armenia	0-1	South Ossetia	Stepanakert Republican Stadium, Stepanakert
18:00			Bazayev 65'	Attendance: 12,000; Referee: Dmitrii Zhukov, Vitalii Mazin, Valerii Kravchenko, Aleksandr Demenko, Ivan Mrkalj

== Current squad ==
The following players were called up for the 2018 ConIFA World Football Cup.

No.	Pos.	Player	Date of birth (age)	Caps	Goals	Club
1	GK	Gevorg Kasparov	25 July 1980 (aged 37)	0	0	(Football Federation of Armenia) FC Gandzasar Kapan
2	DF	Arman Mosoyan	24 April 1990 (aged 28)	0	0	Unattached
3	DF	Fabrice Guzel	9 November 1990 (aged 27)	5	0	(French Football Federation) US Le Pontet
4	DF	Massis Kaya	15 September 1990 (aged 27)	5	0	Unattached
5	DF	Rafael Safaryan	30 January 1986 (aged 32)	0	0	(Football Federation of Armenia) FC Ararat
6	MF	Gevorg Najaryan	6 January 1998 (aged 20)	0	0	(Kazakhstan Football Federation) Shakhter Karagandy
7	MF	Artur Yedigaryan	26 June 1987 (aged 30)	0	0	(Football Association of Serbia) Proleter Novi Sad
8	MF	David Azin	11 January 1990 (aged 28)	2	0	Unattached
9	FW	Vahagn Militosyan	10 June 1993 (aged 24)	3	2	(Slovak Football Association) FC Nitra
10	MF	Khoren Veranyan	4 September 1986 (aged 31)	0	0	Retired
11	FW	David Hovsepyan	15 January 1991 (aged 27)	3	0	(Slovak Football Association) KFC Komárno
12	GK	Khachatur Hovsepyan	15 January 1991 (aged 27)	2	0	(Football Federation of Armenia) FC Ararat
13	DF	Jules Tepelian	31 October 1987 (aged 30)	7	0	(French Football Federation) UGA Ardzv
14	DF	Hiraç Yagan	3 January 1989 (aged 29)	7	1	(Swiss Football Association) Stade Nyonnais
15	MF	Zaven Varjabetyan	12 November 1998 (aged 19)	1	0	(German Football Association) ESC Rellinghausen
16	MF	Norik Hovsepyan	23 December 1998 (aged 19)	0	0	(Football Federation of Armenia) Shirak SC
17	DF	Raffi Kaya	8 June 1994 (aged 23)	5	1	(Swiss Football Association) Lancy
18	MF	Herant Yagan	1 October 1994 (aged 23)	6	0	(Royal Belgian Football Association) FC Suryoye
19	FW	Levon Kürkciyan	2 November 1994 (aged 23)	2	0	(German Football Association) 1. FC Kleve
20	MF	Emmanuel Odemis	5 July 2000 (aged 17)	2	0	(Swiss Football Association) Stade Nyonnais
21	FW	Vicken Valenza-Berberian	21 September 1992 (aged 25)	1	0	(French Football Federation) FC Bords-de-Saône
22	MF	Axel Tashedjian	9 May 2000 (aged 18)	1	0	(French Football Federation) Paris FC
23	MF	Georgi Minasov	21 August 1990 (aged 27)	0	0	Unattached

== Managers ==
Manager	Period	Played	Won	Drawn	Lost	Win %
(Armenia) Gilbert Catikoglu	2015–2016	6	1	1	4	16.7
(Armenia) Harutyun Vardanyan	2018–2019	14	4	3	7	28.6
Totals		20	5	4	11	25

== President ==
President	Year(s)
(Belgium) (Armenia) Hiraç Yagan	2015–present

== Honours ==
=== Non-FIFA competitions ===
- CONIFA European Football Cup
  - Runners-up (1): 2019
