= Vahagn Militosyan =

Armenian footballer (born 1993)

Personal information
- Full name: Vahagn Militosyan
- Date of birth: 10 June 1993 (age 33)
- Place of birth: Etchmiadzin, Armenia
- Height: 1.86 m (6 ft 1 in)
- Position: Striker

Youth career
- Laval

Senior career*
Years	Team	Apps	(Gls)
2010–2014	Laval	3	(0)
2014–2015	Grenoble	2	(0)
2015–2016	UJA Maccabi Paris	9	(2)
2016	Topvar Topoľčany	30	(16)
2017	Komárno	28	(19)
2018	Nitra	13	(0)
2018	iClinic Sereď	4	(0)
2019–	Changé	2	(0)

International career^{‡}
2016–	Western Armenia	8	(4)
- * Club domestic league appearances and goals as of 10:47, 1 May 2020 (UTC) ‡ National team caps and goals as of 7 June 2018

Vahagn Militosyan (French: Vehagn Militosian; born 10 June 1993) is an Armenian professional footballer who plays as a striker.

== Club career ==
Born in Etchmiadzin, Militosyan began his career with Stade Lavallois as a teenager, and before the 2010–11 season, while he was only 17, he was promoted to the team's reserve squad. However, most of the time he was playing for the team's youth side and played only two games for the club while failing to score a goal.

In the 2011–12 season, Militosyan again played for the team's reserve side, but played in only one match. Before the start of the 2012–13 season, he was promoted to the team's main squad and took part in one league match. The following season, he made three appearances.

Before the start of the 2014–15 season, Militosyan signed for fourth-tier club Grenoble Foot 38.

== International career ==
Militosyan was called up to the Armenia national football team in May 2014, but as of August 2014 has not made any appearances.

Militosyan has appeared for Western Armenia, a team representing the Armenian indigenous people primarily from the region of Western Armenia which according to Armenian scholars was on territory occupied by Turkey.
