= Gevorg Arutyunyan =

Russian footballer (born 1997)

Personal information
- Full name: Gevorg Karlenovich Arutyunyan
- Date of birth: 21 February 1997 (age 29)
- Place of birth: Dimitrovgrad, Ulyanovsk Oblast, Russia
- Height: 1.76 m (5 ft 9 1/2 in)
- Position: Forward

Senior career*
Years	Team	Apps	(Gls)
2012–2018	Rubin Kazan	0	(0)
2014–2015	→ Rubin-2 Kazan (loan)	3	(0)
2017	→ Pyunik (loan)	13	(1)
2018–2019	Lada Dimitrovgrad (amateur)		

International career
2015	Russia U-18	2	(0)
- * Club domestic league appearances and goals

Gevorg Karlenovich Arutyunyan (Russian: Геворг Карленович Арутюнян; born 21 February 1997) is a Russian-Armenian former professional footballer who played as a forward.

== Club career ==
He made his professional debut in the Russian Professional Football League for Rubin-2 Kazan on 18 July 2014 against FC Syzran-2003 Syzran.

He played his first game for the main squad of FC Rubin Kazan on 24 September 2015 in a Russian Cup game against FC SKA-Energiya Khabarovsk which his team lost 0-2.

== International ==
He is of Armenian descent and is eligible for both Russia and Armenia. After representing Russia national under-18 football team, he was called up to the Armenia national under-21 football team, but did not play any games for the squad.
