= Petros Avetisyan =

Armenian footballer

Personal information
- Date of birth: 7 January 1996 (age 30)
- Place of birth: Yerevan, Armenia
- Height: 1.78 m (5 ft 10 in)
- Position: Midfielder

Team information
- Current team: Van
- Number: 7

Youth career
- 2002–2013: Banants

Senior career*
| Years | Team | Apps | (Gls) |
| 2014–2016 | Banants | 35 | (4) |
| 2016 | → Pyunik (loan) | 17 | (1) |
| 2017–2018 | Pyunik | 33 | (9) |
| 2019–2020 | Ararat-Armenia | 27 | (9) |
| 2020–2021 | Tobol | 12 | (1) |
| 2021–2022 | Noah | 19 | (9) |
| 2022 | Shakhter Karagandy | 9 | (1) |
| 2022 | Akzhayik | 11 | (3) |
| 2023 | Maktaaral | 9 | (3) |
| 2023–2024 | Khimki | 3 | (0) |
| 2023–2024 | Khimki-M | 2 | (0) |
| 2024 | → Ararat-Armenia (loan) | 11 | (1) |
| 2024–2025 | Alashkert | 24 | (2) |
| 2025–2026 | Gandzasar Kapan | 12 | (1) |
| 2026– | Van | 10 | (3) |

International career^{‡}
| 2015–2018 | Armenia U-21 | 16 | (4) |
| 2019– | Armenia | 7 | (0) |
- * Club domestic league appearances and goals as of 18 June 2026 ‡ National team caps and goals as of 21 June 2023

Petros Avetisyan (Armenian: Պետրոս Ավետիսյան; born 7 January 1996) is an Armenian professional footballer who plays as a midfielder for Armenian Premier League club Van, and the Armenia national team.

== Club career ==
=== Banants ===
Born in Yerevan, Avetisyan started his career at Malatia football school that later was renamed as FC Banants. After progressing through the club's youth system, he became top scorer of Banants-2 in Armenian First league in 2014–15 season and moved to the first team of the club.

On 11 November 2014, he made his debut in Armenia Premier League in away match against Pyunik. In two weeks he already was in starting line-up of Banants.

In 2015–16 he was one of the key players of Banants. The club won the Armenian Cup.

=== Pyunik ===
On 29 July 2016, Avetisyan signed for Pyunik on a six-month loan deal, and played almost all the matches in Starting line-up of the club in the first half of 2016–17 season.

On 23 January 2017, he officially was transferred from Banants to Pyunik.

At the beginning of 2018 he was linked to moving to Ukrainian clubs Zorya Luhansk and FC Oleksandriya.

=== Ararat-Armenia ===
On 27 February 2019, Ararat-Armenia announced the signing of Petros Avetisyan. Avetisyan made his Ararat-Armenia debut on 2 March 2019 in a 4–1 Premier League home win against Ararat Yerevan. He entered the pitch in 55th minute and scored his first Ararat-Armenia goal in 90th minute. In the same season, Avetisyan won to the title of Armenian Premier League with Ararat-Armenia and became champion of Armenia for the first time.

=== Tobol ===
On 12 January 2020, Ararat-Armenia announced that Avetisyan had moved to FC Tobol in the Kazakhstan Premier League, with Tobol confirming the signing on 14 January 2020. He made his debut for FC Tobol on 14 March 2020 in Kazakhstan Premier League Matchday 2 fixture against Zhetysu, as a 90th-minute substitute for Serikzhan Muzhikov. He became Kazakhstan vice-champion with Tobol. On 19 January 2021, Tobol confirmed that Avetisyan had left the club.

=== Noah ===
On 27 February 2021, Avetisyan returned to the Armenian Premier League, signing for FC Noah. He helped his club with 5 goals to reach the second position in the league.

=== Shakhter Karagandy ===
On 16 February 2022, Petros Avetisyan signed a contract with Kazakhstan Premier League club Shakhter Karagandy. On 18 July 2022, Shakhter Karagandy announced the departure of Avetisyan by mutual agreement.

=== Akzhayik ===
On 20 August 2022, Petros Avetisyan signed a contract with Kazakhstan Premier League club FC Akzhayik. On the same day he scored his first goal for Akzhayik making it 2–0 in the game with Caspiy.

=== Maktaaral ===
On 5 March 2023, Petros Avetisyan signed a contract with Kazakhstan Premier League club FC Maktaaral. He left the club in June 2023.

=== Khimki ===
On 22 July 2023, he moved to the Russian First League club Khimki.

==== Ararat-Armenia loan ====
On 15 January 2024, Ararat-Armenia announced the return of Avetisyan on loan from Khimki until the end of the season.

=== Alashkert ===
On 13 September 2024, Alashkert announced the signing of Avetisyan. On 24 June 2025, he left the club along with a group of other players.

== International career ==
Avetisyan made his debut in Armenia national under-21 football team on 8 September 2015 in a home match against Romania.

On 3 November 2016 he was called up to Armenia national football team for the first time.

On 13 June 2017 he scored his first goal for Armenia national under-21 football team as captain. It was against Gibraltar U21 in UEFA U21 Championship Qualifying Round of 2019 in Estádio Algarve, Portugal.

He made his debut for the senior squad on 26 March 2019 in a Euro 2020 qualifier against Finland, as a 74th-minute substitute for Edgar Babayan.

== Career statistics ==
=== Club ===
As of match played 2 July 2022

Appearances and goals by club, season and competition
| Club | Season | League | | | National cup | | Continental | | Other | | Total | |
| Club | Season | Division | Apps | Goals | Apps | Goals | Apps | Goals | Apps | Goals | Apps | Goals |
|---|---|---|---|---|---|---|---|---|---|---|---|---|
| Banants | 2014–15 | Armenian Premier League | 13 | 1 | 1 | 0 | – | | – | | 14 | 1 |
| Banants | 2015–16 | Armenian Premier League | 22 | 3 | 4 | 0 | – | | – | | 26 | 3 |
| Banants | 2016–17 | Armenian Premier League | 0 | 0 | 0 | 0 | 2 | 0 | – | | 2 | 0 |
| Banants | Total | | 35 | 4 | 5 | 0 | 2 | 0 | 0 | 0 | 42 | 4 |
| Pyunik (loan) | 2016–17 | Armenian Premier League | 17 | 1 | 2 | 0 | 0 | 0 | – | | 19 | 1 |
| Pyunik | 2016–17 | Armenian Premier League | 7 | 1 | 2 | 1 | 0 | 0 | – | | 9 | 1 |
| Pyunik | 2017–18 | Armenian Premier League | 15 | 6 | 2 | 2 | 2 | 1 | – | | 19 | 9 |
| Pyunik | 2018–19 | Armenian Premier League | 11 | 2 | 1 | 0 | 3 | 0 | – | | 17 | 2 |
| Pyunik | Total | | 33 | 9 | 5 | 3 | 5 | 1 | 0 | 0 | 43 | 13 |
| Ararat-Armenia | 2018–19 | Armenian Premier League | 14 | 6 | 2 | 0 | – | | – | | 16 | 6 |
| Ararat-Armenia | 2017–18 | Armenian Premier League | 13 | 3 | 1 | 2 | 8 | 3 | 1 | 0 | 23 | 8 |
| Ararat-Armenia | Total | | 27 | 9 | 3 | 2 | 8 | 3 | 1 | 0 | 39 | 14 |
| Tobol | 2020 | Kazakhstan Premier League | 12 | 1 | 0 | 0 | – | | – | | 12 | 1 |
| Noah | 2020–21 | Armenian Premier League | 10 | 5 | 3 | 2 | – | | – | | 13 | 7 |
| Noah | 2021–22 | Armenian Premier League | 9 | 4 | 1 | 0 | 2 | 0 | – | | 12 | 4 |
| Noah | Total | | 19 | 9 | 4 | 2 | 2 | 0 | 0 | 0 | 25 | 11 |
| Shakhter Karagandy | 2022 | Kazakhstan Premier League | 9 | 1 | 0 | 0 | – | | – | | 9 | 1 |
| Career total | | | 152 | 33 | 19 | 7 | 17 | 4 | 1 | 0 | 189 | 44 |

=== International ===
As of match played 19 November 2022

Appearances and goals by national team and year
| National team | Year | Apps | Goals |
|---|---|---|---|
| Armenia | 2019 | 5 | 0 |
| Armenia | 2022 | 2 | 0 |
| Total | | 7 | 0 |

== Honours ==
Banants

- Armenian Cup: 2015–16
- Armenian Supercup: 2014

Ararat-Armenia

- Armenian Premier League: 2018–19
- Armenian Supercup: 2019
