= Norayr Gyozalyan =

Armenian footballer

Personal information
- Date of birth: 15 March 1990 (age 36)
- Place of birth: Yerevan, Armenian SSR
- Height: 1.68 m (5 ft 6 in)
- Position: Forward

Senior career*
Years	Team	Apps	(Gls)
2006	Patani	11	(6)
2007–2011	Banants	59	(12)
2011–2013	Impulse	54	(28)
2013	Torpedo-BelAZ Zhodino	5	(0)
2014–2016	Alashkert	62	(16)
2017–2018	Banants	28	(5)
2018–2019	Artsakh	11	(0)
- * Club domestic league appearances and goals as of 21:52, 13 June 2019 (UTC)

Norayr Gyozalyan (Armenian: Նորայր Գյոզալյան; born 15 March 1990) is an Armenian former professional football player, most recently playing for Artsakh of the Armenian Premier League.
