= Claudio Torrejón =

American soccer player (born 1993)

Personal information
- Full name: Claudio Torrejón Tineo
- Date of birth: May 14, 1993 (age 33)
- Place of birth: Miami, Florida, United States
- Height: 1.79 m (5 ft 10 1/2 in)
- Position: Midfielder

Team information
- Current team: Cienciano
- Number: 14

Senior career*
Years	Team	Apps	(Gls)
2011–2012	Sporting Cristal	4	(0)
2013–2015	Universidad San Martín	5	(0)
2015	Ulisses	11	(0)
2016	Banants	23	(0)
2017	Fénix	14	(0)
2017–2018	Cerceda	29	(0)
2019	Sport Huancayo	6	(0)
2019–2022	Sport Boys	53	(3)
2023–	Cienciano	83	(2)
- * Club domestic league appearances and goals as of 30 December 2025

Claudio Torrejón Tineo (born May 14, 1993) is an American soccer player who plays for Cienciano as a midfielder.

== Career ==
Torrejón left FC Banants following their last game before the winter break, in December 2016.

On January 9, 2019, Torrejón joined Sport Huancayo.

== Career statistics ==
=== Club ===
As of match played 3 December 2016

Appearances and goals by club, season and competition
Club	Season	League			National Cup		Continental		Other		Total	
Club	Season	Division	Apps	Goals	Apps	Goals	Apps	Goals	Apps	Goals	Apps	Goals
Ulisses	2015–16	Armenian Premier League	11	0	1	0	–		–		12	0
Banants	2015–16	Armenian Premier League	7	0	3	0	-		-		10	0
Banants	2016–17	Armenian Premier League	16	0	2	0	2	0	1	0	21	0
Banants	Total		23	0	5	0	2	0	1	0	31	0
Career total			34	0	6	0	2	0	1	0	43	0
