= Anton Savin =

Ukrainian footballer

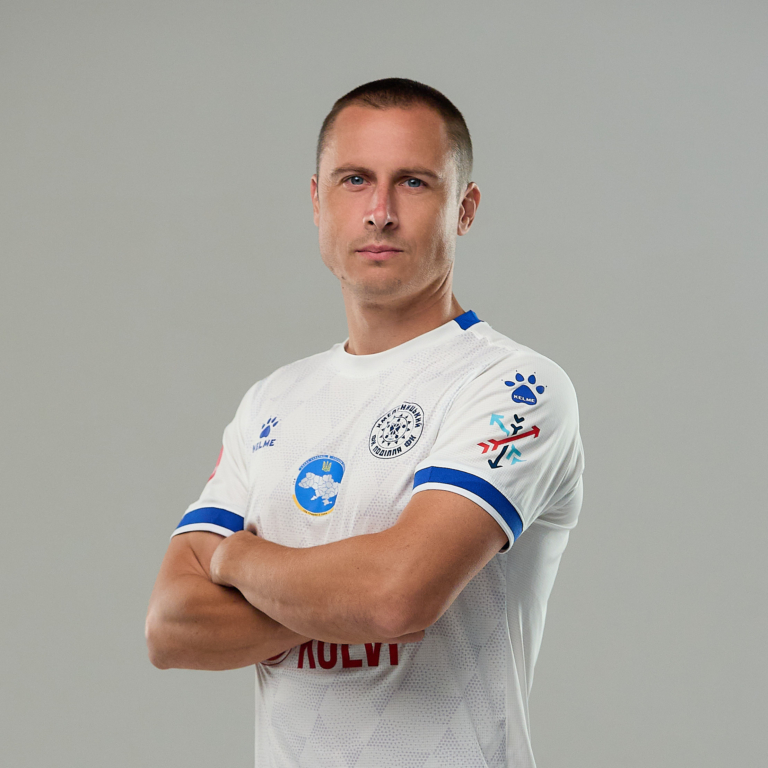

Personal information
- Full name: Anton Vasylyovych Savin
- Date of birth: 7 February 1990 (age 36)
- Place of birth: Cherkasy, Ukrainian SSR
- Height: 1.77 m (5 ft 10 in)
- Position: Right winger

Team information
- Current team: Podillya Khmelnytskyi
- Number: 35

Youth career
- 2002–2003: DYuSSh-13 Kharkiv
- 2003–2007: UFK Kharkiv

Senior career*
Years	Team	Apps	(Gls)
2007	Hazovyk-KhGV Kharkiv	13	(0)
2008	Hirnyk Kryvyi Rih	32	(2)
2009–2012	Metalurh Donetsk	1	(0)
2011–2012	→ Stal Dniprodzerzhynsk	12	(2)
2012–2013	Bukovyna Chernivtsi	36	(4)
2014–2015	Helios Kharkiv	24	(2)
2015	Kolos Zachepylivka (amateurs)	10	(3)
2015	Naftovyk-Ukrnafta Okhtyrka	17	(2)
2016	Hirnyk-Sport Komsomolsk	11	(0)
2016–2017	Alashkert	3	(0)
2017	Sumy	12	(2)
2017–2018	Poltava	32	(2)
2018	Sumy	11	(3)
2019	Polissya Zhytomyr	10	(0)
2019–2022	Metalist 1925 Kharkiv	66	(2)
2022–2023	LNZ Cherkasy	31	(3)
2024	FSC Mariupol	26	(1)
2025–	Podillya Khmelnytskyi	39	(6)

International career
2011	Ukraine U21	1	(0)
- * Club domestic league appearances and goals as of 4 June 2026

Anton Vasylyovych Savin (Ukrainian: Антон Васильович Савін; born 7 February 1990) is a Ukrainian professional footballer who plays as a right winger for Podillya Khmelnytskyi.

== Club career ==
Savin is a product of the 2 Kharkiv's Youth Sportive School Systems. He spent almost all his career as a player in different clubs of the Ukrainian First League and the Ukrainian Second League.

=== Alashkert ===
In June 2016, he signed one-year deal with Armenian club Alashkert.

=== LNZ Cherkasy ===
On 11 July 2022 he signed for LNZ Cherkasy.
