= Irakli Kvekveskiri =

Georgian footballer (born 1990)

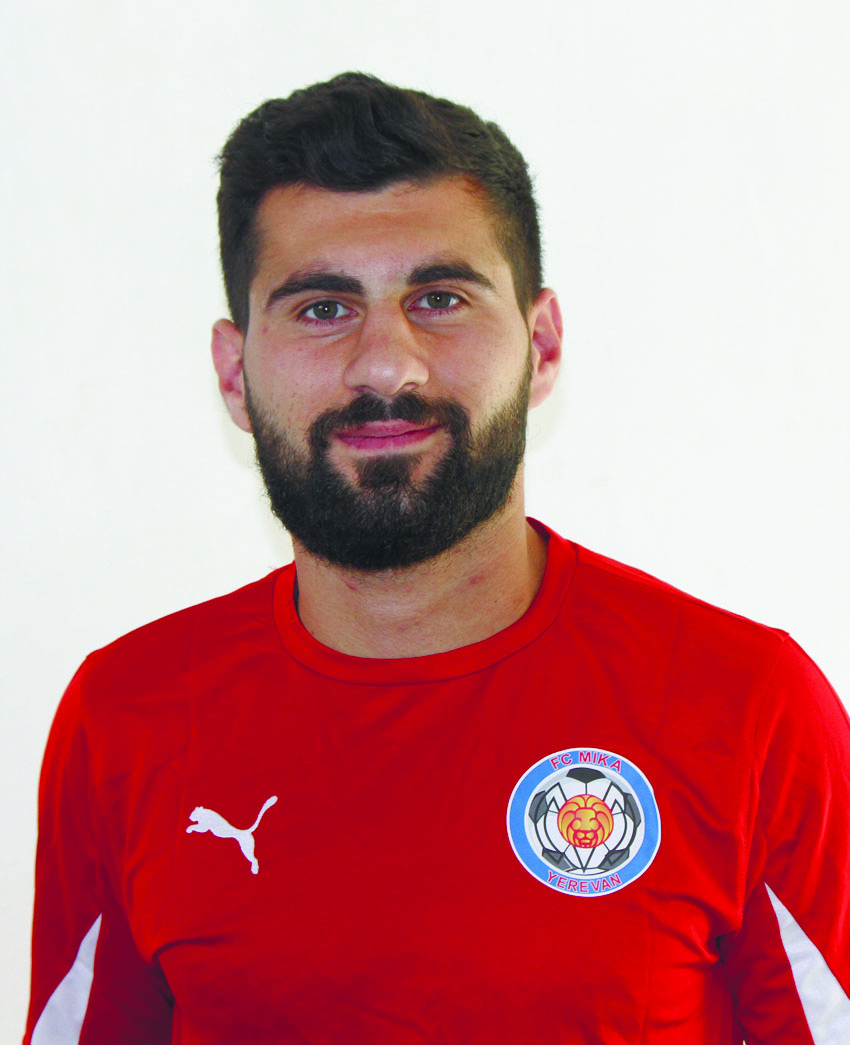
- Kvekveskiri with Mika in 2015

Personal information
- Date of birth: 12 March 1990 (age 36)
- Place of birth: Ochamchire, Georgia
- Height: 1.78 m (5 ft 10 in)
- Position: Defensive midfielder

Youth career
- –2008: Dynamo Moscow
- 2008–2010: Kuban Krasnodar

Senior career*
Years	Team	Apps	(Gls)
2010–2012	Pécs	20	(2)
2011–2012	→ Szigetszentmiklós (loan)	13	(1)
2012–2013	Dinamo Batumi	11	(0)
2013–2015	Szigetszentmiklós	53	(2)
2015	Mika	13	(1)
2016	Guria Lanchkhuti	12	(1)
2016–2017	Alashkert	25	(1)
2017–2018	Ararat Moscow	20	(1)
2018–2022	SKA-Khabarovsk	119	(6)
2022–2025	Fakel Voronezh	82	(3)
2025–2026	Orenburg	24	(0)

International career
2009–2010	Georgia U-19	4	(1)
2011	Georgia U-21	2	(0)
- * Club domestic league appearances and goals as of 18 August 2026

Irakli Kvekveskiri (Georgian: ირაკლი კვეკვესკირი, Russian: Ираклий Квеквескири; born 12 March 1990) is a Russian-Georgian former football player who played as a defensive midfielder.

== Club career ==
Kvekveskiri was born in Abkhazia. Ethnically, he is Mingrelian.

Kvekveskiri is a FC Dynamo Moscow academy graduate. In 2009, he played for FC Kuban Krasnodar's reserve team, appearing in 26 matches and scoring 1 goal in the youth championship.

Kvekveskiri made his professional football debut in the 2009–10 season for Hungarian club Pécsi MFC. He was a part of the squad that finished 1st in the Western Group of the 2010–11 Nemzeti Bajnokság II, which promoted the club to the highest tier of Hungarian football league system. Kvekveskiri spent the first half of the 2011–12 season on loan with second-tier club Szigetszentmiklósi TK, but later returned to Pécsi MFC, making 6 appearances in the top division.

In autumn 2012, Kvekveskiri moved to Georgian top-tier club FC Dinamo Batumi. He made his debut for the team on 22 September 2012 in a 1–5 away loss against FC Torpedo Kutaisi.

On 1 January 2013, Kvekveskiri returned to Szigetszentmiklósi TK, signing a permanent deal. During two and a half years at the club, Irakli made 67 appearances and scored 3 goals in all competitions.

In summer 2015, Kvekveskiri moved to Armenian Premier League side FC Mika. He made his debut for the club on 1 August 2015 as a centre-back in a 1–1 away draw against FC Banants Yerevan. Irakli played a total of 16 matches in all competitions for the club, scoring 1 goal.

On 31 January 2016, Kvekveskiri signed for Georgian club FC Guria Lanchkhuti.

On 1 July 2016, Kvekveskiri returned to the Armenian Premier League by joining the defending champions FC Alashkert. He made his debut for the club in the second leg of 2016–17 UEFA Champions League second qualifying round against Georgian club FC Dinamo Tbilisi. Alashkert, eventually, won the 2016–17 Armenian Premier League with Kvekveskiri making a total of 28 appearances and scoring 1 goal for the club in all competitions during the season.

In June 2017, Kvekveskiri joined Russian club FC Ararat, which based in Moscow and represented the Armenian diaspora in Russia. Irakli was part of the squad that secured first place in the Centre Zone of the 2017–18 Russian Professional Football League and the right to promote to the second-tier Russian Football National League, but Ararat failed to receive a license.

However, Kvekveskiri got the opportunity to play in the Russian Football National League by joining the then-relegated from the Russian Premier League club FC SKA-Khabarovsk in June 2018. During his consecutive four-season spell in Khabarovsk, Irakli made a total of 126 appearances for the club, which he also captained, and scored 7 goals.

On 10 June 2022, Kvekveskiri signed with the just-promoted to the Russian Premier League club FC Fakel Voronezh. During his first season with Fakel, he made 32 appearances in all competitions, scoring 3 goals, including a brace in a 3–3 home draw against FC Krasnodar on 5 November 2022. Kvekveskiri was also the club's first-choice captain during the second half of the season and played a crucial ball-winning role on the field, helping Fakel to keep their Premier League spot for another season. On 28 May 2024, his contract with Fakel was extended.

== Career statistics ==
=== Club ===
As of match played 17 May 2026

Appearances and goals by club, season and competition
Club	Season	League			National Cup		League Cup		Continental		Other		Total	
Club	Season	Division	Apps	Goals	Apps	Goals	Apps	Goals	Apps	Goals	Apps	Goals	Apps	Goals
Pécsi	2009–10	Nemzeti Bajnokság II	4	0	0	0	—		—		—		4	0
Pécsi	2010–11	Nemzeti Bajnokság II	10	2	1	0	—		—		—		11	2
Pécsi	2011–12	Nemzeti Bajnokság I	6	0	0	0	0	0	—		—		6	0
Pécsi	Total		20	2	1	0	0	0	—		—		21	2
Szigetszentmiklósi (loan)	2011–12	Nemzeti Bajnokság II	13	1	1	0	—		—		—		14	1
Dinamo Batumi	2012–13	Erovnuli Liga	11	0	0	0	—		—		—		11	0
Szigetszentmiklósi	2012–13	Nemzeti Bajnokság II	14	0	0	0	—		0	0	2	0	16	0
Szigetszentmiklósi	2013–14	Nemzeti Bajnokság II	25	2	0	0	9	1	—		—		34	3
Szigetszentmiklósi	2014–15	Nemzeti Bajnokság II	14	0	0	0	3	0	—		—		17	0
Szigetszentmiklósi	Total		53	2	0	0	12	1	—		2	0	67	3
Mika	2015–16	Armenian Premier League	13	1	2	0	—		—		1	0	16	1
Guria Lanchkhuti	2016	Erovnuli Liga	12	1	0	0	—		—		—		12	1
Alashkert	2016–17	Armenian Premier League	25	1	2	0	—		1 (Note: Appearance in UEFA Champions League)	0	—		28	1
Ararat Moscow	2017–18	Russian Second League	20	1	2	0	—		—		5 (Note: Appearances in the FNL Cup)	0	27	1
SKA-Khabarovsk	2018–19	Russian First League	32	1	2	1	—		—		—		34	2
SKA-Khabarovsk	2019–20	Russian First League	21	1	0	0	—		—		—		21	1
SKA-Khabarovsk	2020–21	Russian First League	33	4	3	0	—		—		—		36	4
SKA-Khabarovsk	2021–22	Russian First League	33	0	0	0	—		—		2 (Note: Appearances in the promotion play-offs)	0	35	0
SKA-Khabarovsk	Total		119	6	5	1	—		—		2	0	126	7
Fakel Voronezh	2022–23	Russian Premier League	27	3	3	0	—		—		2 (Note: Appearances in the relegation play-offs)	0	32	3
Fakel Voronezh	2023–24	Russian Premier League	29	0	2	0	—		—		—		31	0
Fakel Voronezh	2024–25	Russian Premier League	24	0	2	0	—		—		—		26	0
Fakel Voronezh	Total		80	3	7	0	—		—		2	0	89	3
Orenburg	2025–26	Russian Premier League	24	0	2	0	—		—		—		26	0
Career total			390	18	22	1	12	1	1	0	12	0	437	20
