= Artur Yuspashyan =

Armenian footballer

Personal information
- Full name: Artur Yuspashyan
- Date of birth: 7 September 1989 (age 37)
- Place of birth: Yerevan, Soviet Union
- Position: Defensive midfielder

Team information
- Current team: Gandzasar Kapan
- Number: 20

Senior career*
Years	Team	Apps	(Gls)
2007–2016	Pyunik	188	(8)
2016	Anagennisi Deryneia	10	(0)
2017–2018	Gandzasar Kapan	43	(0)

International career^{‡}
2008	Armenia U-19	3	(0)
2009–2010	Armenia U-21	10	(0)
2010–	Armenia	10	(0)
- * Club domestic league appearances and goals as of 23 May 2018 (UTC) ‡ National team caps and goals as of 5 June 2012

Artur Yuspashyan (Armenian: Արթուր Յուսպաշյան; born 7 September 1989) is an Armenian professional footballer who plays as a defensive midfielder for Gandzasar Kapan. He has also made several appearances for the Armenia national football team.

== Personal life ==
Artur Yuspashyan became a father on 5 February 2013 with his wife. Their first-born child was named Adrian.
