= Artur Yedigaryan =

Armenian footballer (born 1987)

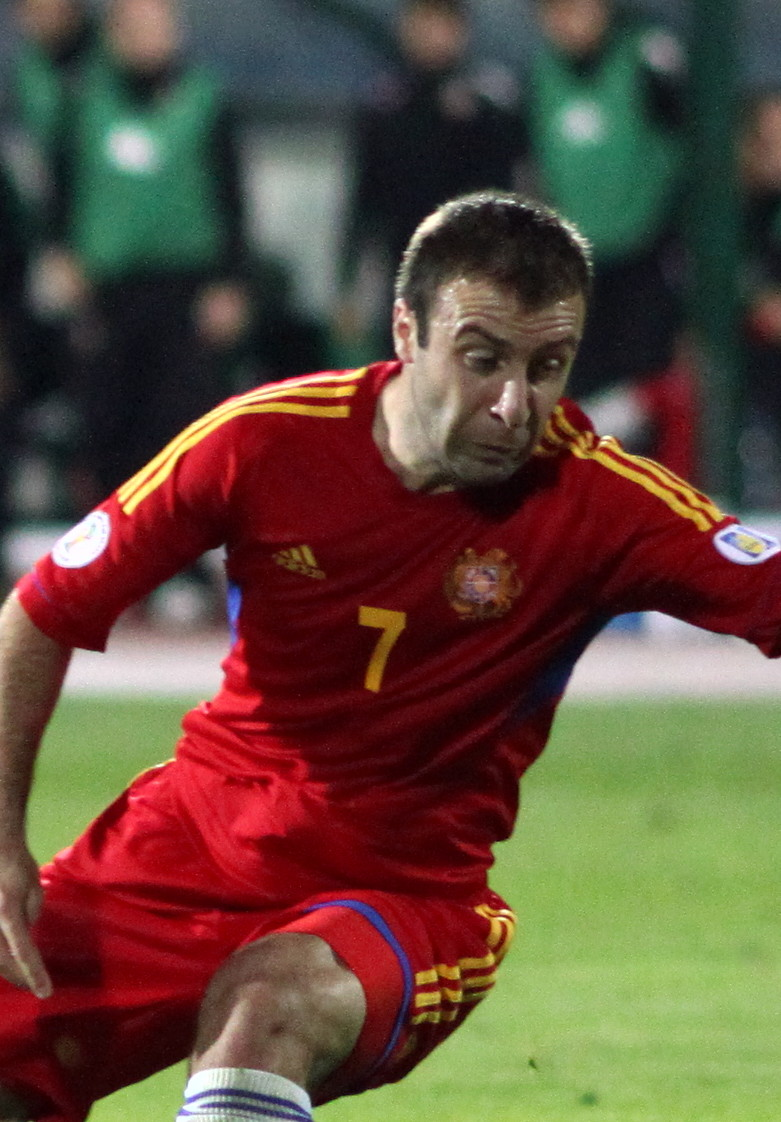

Personal information
- Date of birth: 26 June 1987 (age 39)
- Place of birth: Yerevan, Soviet Union
- Height: 1.73 m (5 ft 8 in)
- Position: Defensive midfielder

Team information
- Current team: Sevan (assistant)

Youth career
- 2004–2006: Pyunik Yerevan

Senior career*
| Years | Team | Apps | (Gls) |
| 2006–2011 | Pyunik Yerevan | 68 | (9) |
| 2009–2011 | → Pas Hamedan (loan) | 38 | (4) |
| 2011 | → Banants Yerevan (loan) | 17 | (4) |
| 2012 | Khimki | 9 | (1) |
| 2012 | Pyunik Yerevan | 3 | (1) |
| 2012–2013 | Hoverla Uzhhorod | 19 | (0) |
| 2013–2014 | Kairat | 38 | (1) |
| 2015 | Dinamo Minsk | 14 | (1) |
| 2016–2019 | Alashkert | 86 | (7) |
| 2019 | Proleter Novi Sad | 3 | (0) |
| 2019 | Alashkert | 2 | (0) |

International career
| 2003–2003 | Armenia U17 | 2 | (0) |
| 2005–2005 | Armenia U19 | 3 | (0) |
| 2006–2008 | Armenia U21 | 7 | (0) |
| 2008–2015 | Armenia | 41 | (0) |
| 2018–2020 | Western Armenia | 6 | (1) |

Managerial career
- 2020–: Sevan (assistant)
- * Club domestic league appearances and goals

Artur Yedigaryan (Armenian: Արթուր Եդիգարյան; born 26 June 1987) is an Armenian former professional footballer who played as a midfielder. He is the assistant manager of Sevan.

A former regular Armenia national team player, from 2018 he represented the Western Armenia national team in their CONIFA tournaments. Yedigaryan is a player who was instrumental in both FC Pyunik four consecutive Armenian championships from 2006 and 2009, and later FC Alashkert dominance by winning three consecutive Armenian championships between 2015 and 2018. In between he had earned valuable experience abroad in Iran, Russia, Ukraine, Kazakhstan, where he won one cup, and the latest, in Serbia.

== Club career ==
Artur Yedigaryan was born in Armenian capital Yerevan to a family of football players, being himself and his brother the third generation after his father and grandfather having been also professional footballers. Artur started playing football at the age of 6. The Yedigaryan's lived in a house located next to the Yerevan's Republican Stadium, the major stadium in the country. The first coach of Yedigaryan was Hovik Ghazanchyan. He is a graduate of football school Pyunik Yerevan which at time dominated Aemrnian football. Aged 19 he became part of the first team and, as part of Pyunik, Yedigaryan became Armenian champion four times in a raw, winning the Armenian Premier League in 2006, 2007, 2008 and 2009, plus the Armenian Cup in 2009 and the Armenian Supercup in 2007 and 2008. Before the end of the Armenian Premier League in 2009, Yedigaryan was loaned to the PAS Hamedan club in the Iran Pro League. which was his first experience abroad.

Upon termination of the contract with Hamedan, Yedigaryan, again on loan, went to Banants Yerevan, becoming the first rookie club in anticipation of the club to participate in the European Cup. Productively after playing six-month on the contract, Edigaryan returned to Pyunik. In December, Bulgarian media reported that the Bulgarian club Chernomorets Burgas is interested in his services. However, the coaching staff did not comment on this information, and the offer ended rejected.

In early 2012, Khimki, a club from metropolitan area of Russian capital Moscow, expressed interest in Yerdigaryan. He joined the team for training camp. Due to financial disagreements between the clubs, the football transfer took long to be confirmed. However, on 24 February, Yedigaryan signed with Khimki. Details of the transfer were not released. In late June, Yedigaryan, along his compatriot Artak Aleksanyan, left the club. He returned to his native club Pyunik by early August, being the main signing along with Tigran Kandikyan and Eric Yeghiazaryan. Yedigaryan entered into an agreement with the club until the end of the 2012–13 season. In the short first game, he was released in the starting lineup against Impuls FC Dilijan. At the 67th minute, he was replaced by Artur Grigoryan.

In mid-August, Yedigaryan traveled to Uzhhorod, Ukraine, where he held a preview at local club Hoverla Uzhhorod. He passed the reials and the club signed Yedigaryan giving him the number 22. On 25 August, in the 7th round of the Ukrainian Premier League, he made his debut in the away game against Illichivets Mariupol. He played 60 minutes and was replaced after the first goal was scored by Sotiris Balafas.

After a spell in Ukraine, Yedigaryan signed with Kazakh side FC Kairat. He played with Kairat the second half of the 2013 and the entire 2014 season. In both seasons he finished 3rd in the league, however, the second season was more successful since he won the 2014 Kazakhstan Cup. He was released by FC Kairat following the completion of the 2014 season, signing for FC Dinamo Minsk in March 2015. He played regularly with Dinamo Minsk, however, in summer 2015, he received an offer from a new Armenian powerhouse, FC Alashkert, that he could not reject. He ended making the right decision, the club was forming a strong team that ended winning three consecutive Armenian titles, Yediganyan had all major role in. In its fourth season, the club failed to repeat the national title, and finished 4th in the league, this meant Yedirganyan was finishing a successful cycle, not before crowning his spell at Alashket with a 2018–19 Armenian Cup title.

On 5 June 2019, Yedigaryan was released by Alashkert along with six other players. Hpwever, he was picked by Serbian club FK Proleter Novi Sad, a recently promoted Serbian SuperLiga club that saw in his experience a valuable reinforcement for their 2019–20 campaign. Although he started at the bench, he entered in the game as substitute in the second half of the first SuperLiga round. However, after 3 league appearances, he left Proleter and returned to Armenia to FC Alashkert where he played until December 2019 when he retired.

== International career ==
Artur Yedigaryan made his debut for the Armenia national team on 2 February 2008 in an away friendly match against Malta. In 2015 he made his 41 appearances and ever since has been less active in the Amernian national team.

Instead, in May 2018, Yedigaryan was called up to represent Western Armenia in the 2018 ConIFA World Football Cup. In June 2018, Yedigaryan was called up to represent Western Armenia in the 2019 CONIFA European Football Cup.

== Personal life ==
Artur's younger brother Artak Yedigaryan also plays for the Armenia national team. Their father, Gegham Yedigaryan, was a Soviet football player and their grandfather Felix Veranyan was also a football player and is currently a football manager. Artur is married to a woman named Gayane. The couple were classmates and have a daughter.

== Coaching career ==
Yedigaryan retired at the end of 2019, and on 20 January 2020, he was appointed assistant manager of Sevan FC.

== Honours ==
Pyunik

- Armenian Premier League: 2006, 2007, 2008, 2009
- Armenian Cup: 2009, 2013
- Armenian Supercup: 2007, 2008

Kairat

- Kazakhstan Cup: 2014

Alashkert

- Armenian Premier League: 2015–16, 2016–17, 2017–18
- Armenian Cup: 2019
