= Vahagn Minasyan =

Armenian footballer (born 1985)

Personal information
- Date of birth: 25 April 1985 (age 41)
- Place of birth: Yerevan, Soviet Armenia
- Height: 1.83 m (6 ft 0 in)
- Position: Defender

Senior career*
Years	Team	Apps	(Gls)
2003	Spartak Yerevan	6	(0)
2003–2005	Kotayk Abovian	48	(4)
2006–2008	Ararat Yerevan	72	(9)
2009–2010	Pyunik Yerevan	46	(5)
2010–2012	Mika Yerevan	7	(0)
2012–2013	Ulisses FC	0	(0)
2013–2018	Alashkert Yerevan	79	(5)
2018–2019	Lernayin Artsakh FC	13	(0)
Total		271	(23)

International career
2004–2004	Armenia U-21	2	(0)
2007–2016	Armenia	13	(1)
- * Club domestic league appearances and goals

Vahagn Minasyan (Armenian: Վահագն Մինասյան, born 25 April 1985) is an Armenian former professional footballer who played as a defender. He made 12 appearances scoring 1 goal for the Armenia national team after his debut in a UEFA Euro 2008 qualifying match against Kazakhstan on 2 June 2007.

== Career statistics ==
Scores and results list Armenia's goal tally first.

No	Date	Venue	Opponent	Score	Result	Competition
1.	15 October 2008	Bilino Polje Stadium, Zenica, Bosnia and Herzegovina	Bosnia and Herzegovina	1–3	1–4	2010 FIFA World Cup qualification
