= Aleksandar Tasić =

Serbian footballer

Personal information
- Date of birth: 6 April 1988 (age 38)
- Place of birth: Jagodina, SFR Yugoslavia
- Height: 1.85 m (6 ft 1 in)
- Position: Centre-back

Youth career
- OFK Beograd

Senior career*
Years	Team	Apps	(Gls)
2006–2007	Obilić	27	(2)
2008–2009	Šumadija Aranđelovac	20	(1)
2010	Dinamo Vranje	13	(1)
2011	Mladi Radnik	12	(1)
2012	Smederevo	12	(1)
2013–2014	Radnički Svilajnac	10	(1)
2014–2015	Champagne Sports	10	(1)
2015	Le Mont	2	(1)
2016	Tërbuni Pukë	14	(1)
2016	Alashkert	9	(1)
2017	Novi Pazar	10	(1)
2017	Speranța Nisporeni	2	(0)
2018	Bačka Palanka	11	(0)
2018	Dinamo Vranje	2	(0)
2018–2019	Zlatibor Čajetina	17	(3)
2019	Vasalunds IF	27	(1)
2020	OFK Žarkovo	6	(0)
2020–2021	Radnički Svilajnac		
- * Club domestic league appearances and goals as of 10 January 2021

Aleksandar Tasić (Serbian Cyrillic: Александар Тасић, born 6 April 1988) is a Serbian professional footballer.
