= Atsamaz Burayev =

Russian professional footballer

Personal information
- Full name: Atsamaz Buziyevich Burayev
- Date of birth: 5 February 1990 (age 36)
- Place of birth: Ordzhonikidze, Russian SFSR
- Height: 1.74 m (5 ft 9 in)
- Position: Forward

Team information
- Current team: FC Fakel Voronezh (fitness coach)

Senior career*
| Years | Team | Apps | (Gls) |
| 2008 | FC Avtodor Vladikavkaz | 27 | (1) |
| 2009 | PFC Spartak Nalchik | 0 | (0) |
| 2010 | FC Avtodor Vladikavkaz | 16 | (8) |
| 2010–2012 | FC Alania Vladikavkaz | 31 | (3) |
| 2012 | FC Alania-d Vladikavkaz | 13 | (4) |
| 2013 | FC Mashuk-KMV Pyatigorsk | 14 | (4) |
| 2014 | FC Luch-Energiya Vladivostok | 9 | (0) |
| 2014–2015 | FC Alania Vladikavkaz | 28 | (12) |
| 2015 | FC Gandzasar Kapan | 14 | (5) |
| 2015–2016 | FC Banants | 18 | (2) |
| 2017 | Alashkert | 4 | (0) |
| 2017 | Zhetysu | 5 | (0) |

Managerial career
- 2022–2025: FC Alania Vladikavkaz (assistant)
- 2026–: FC Fakel Voronezh (fitness coach)
- * Club domestic league appearances and goals

Atsamaz Buziyevich Burayev (Russian: Ацамаз Бузиевич Бураев; born 5 February 1990) is a Russian professional football coach and a former player. He is the fitness coach with FC Fakel Voronezh.

== Club career ==
He made his professional debut in the Russian Second Division in 2008 for FC Avtodor Vladikavkaz.

In November 2015 he had been transferred to FC Banants.
