= Dmytro Khovbosha =

Ukrainian footballer

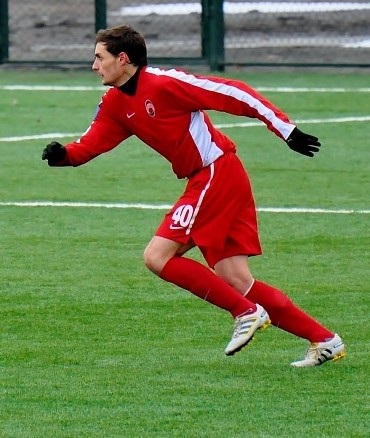
- Khovbosha in 2011

Personal information
- Full name: Dmytro Viktorovych Khovbosha
- Date of birth: 5 February 1989 (age 37)
- Place of birth: Milove, Voroshylovhrad Oblast, Ukrainian SSR
- Height: 1.83 m (6 ft 0 in)
- Position: Defender

Youth career
- 2002–2005: LVUFK Luhansk

Senior career*
Years	Team	Apps	(Gls)
2005–2012	Zorya Luhansk	7	(0)
2011–2012	→Stal Alchevsk (loan)	17	(0)
2012–2013	Naftovyk-Ukrnafta Okhtyrka	28	(1)
2014	Shakhtar Sverdlovsk	10	(0)
2014	Stal Dniprodzerzhynsk	9	(0)
2015–2016	Kremin Kremenchuk	20	(1)
2016–2017	Alashkert	26	(0)
2018	Avanhard Kramatorsk	4	(0)
2018	Banants	0	(0)
2019–2020	Veres Rivne	27	(2)
2020–2021	Avanhard Kramatorsk	16	(1)

International career^{‡}
2005	Ukraine-17	8	(0)
- * Club domestic league appearances and goals as of 24 July 2021 ‡ National team caps and goals as of 17 June 2018

Dmytro Viktorovych Khovbosha (Ukrainian: Дмитро Вікторович Ховбоша; born 5 February 1989) is a professional Ukrainian football defender.
