= Andranik Voskanyan =

Armenian footballer

Personal information
- Date of birth: 11 April 1990 (age 36)
- Place of birth: Yerevan, Armenian SSR
- Height: 1.85 m (6 ft 1 in)
- Position: Centre-back

Senior career*
Years	Team	Apps	(Gls)
2008–2015	Mika	114	(6)
2015–2018	Alashkert	64	(0)
2019	Urartu	6	(0)
2020–2022	Van	57	(0)
2022	Alashkert	16	(0)

International career^{‡}
2011	Armenia U-21	7	(0)
2012–	Armenia	1	(0)
- * Club domestic league appearances and goals as of 5 January 2023 ‡ National team caps and goals as of 30 May 2015

Andranik Voskanyan (Armenian: Անդրանիկ Ոսկանյան; born 11 April 1990) is an Armenian professional footballer who plays as a centre-back.

== Club career ==
Andranik Voskanyan loved football from early childhood. When he was in the first grade, a football coach visited looking for children interested in playing football. Voskanyan did not miss the opportunity and started to go to training. He began his career in the football school of Malatia Yerevan (now school property of Banants Yerevan) under the direction of Hakob Andreasyan.

He started playing for Mika-2 in the Armenian First League in 2008. Two years later, Voskanyan made his debut for the first team Mika Yerevan in the Armenian Premier League. He played three games that year. In 2011, he got a starter position in the defense and was a major player that season. In the 2011–12 UEFA Europa League, Mika had a match against Norwegian club Vålerenga Fotball. Voskanyan did not play on the field and remained at the touch-lines.

Voskanyan was released by FC Urartu on 5 December 2019.

On 5 January 2023, Voskanyan left Alashkert after his contract was terminated by mutual consent.

== International career ==
In 2011, the head coach of the Armenia national team saw Voskanyan's skills and recruited him in the Armenia U-21 youth team. On June 7 the same year, he made his debut for the youth national team in the qualifying matches for the 2013 UEFA European Under-21 Football Championship. His debut came in the opening match against the Montenegro U-21 youth team, which the Armenian youth team dealt a 4–1 defeat. He played five games as a youth, all in 2011.

On 28 February 2012, he made his debut in the Armenia senior national team in a friendly match against Serbia. Voskanyan played on the field in the 77th minute of the match, replacing Varazdat Haroyan. The match ended in 2–0 defeat for Armenia.

== Honours ==
Pyunik Yerevan

- Armenian Premier League runner-up: 2009
- Armenian Cup: 2011
- Armenian Supercup: 2012–13
