= Vardan Pogosyan =

Armenian-Russian footballer

Personal information
- Full name: Vardan Grigorievich Pogosyan
- Date of birth: 8 March 1992 (age 34)
- Place of birth: Yerevan, Armenia
- Height: 1.79 m (5 ft 10 in)
- Position: Forward

Team information
- Current team: Gandzasar Kapan
- Number: 7

Youth career
- –2006: Burevestnik Moscow
- 2006–2008: Spartak-2 Moscow

Senior career*
Years	Team	Apps	(Gls)
2011–2013	Horadada		
2013–2014	Real Murcia Imperial		
2014–2015	SS Reyes		
2015–2016	Kuban-2 Krasnodar	0	(0)
2015	→ Pyunik (loan)	18	(9)
2016	Dacia Chișinău	0	(0)
2016–2017	Pyunik	27	(6)
2017–2018	Rabotnički	11	(0)
2018	Gandzasar Kapan	27	(0)
2019	Banants	2	(1)
2019	Alashkert	2	(0)
2019–2020	Gandzasar Kapan	11	(1)

International career
2014	Armenia U21	2	(0)
2015–2016	Armenia	3	(0)
- * Club domestic league appearances and goals

Vardan Grigorievich Pogosyan (Armenian: Վարդան Գրիգորիի Պողոսյան, Russian: Вардан Григорьевич Погосян; born 8 March 1992) is an Armenian-Russian former footballer who played as a forward.

== Career ==
Pogosyan made two appearances for the Armenia national under-21 team, appearing twice against Iran Olympic team on 4 and 6 August 2014. He made his senior debut for Armenia on 8 October 2015 in a friendly match against France, which finished as a 0–4 loss.

== Career statistics ==
=== International ===
As of 8 October 2016

Armenia
Year	Apps	Goals
2015	2	0
2016	1	0
Total	3	0
