= 2016–17 Armenian Premier League =

Armenian Premier League
- Season: 2016–17
- Dates: 6 August 2016 – 31 May 2017
- Champions: Alashkert
- Champions League: Alashkert
- Europa League: Gandzasar Kapan; Shirak; Pyunik
- Matches: 90
- Goals: 198 (2.2 per match)
- All statistics correct as of 31 May 2017.

The 2016–17 Armenian Premier League season was the 25th since its establishment. The season began on 6 August 2016 and ended on 31 May 2017. Alashkert are the defending champions.

== Teams ==
Six teams competed in this year's competition.

Location of teams in the 2016–17 Armenian Premier League

Club	Location	Stadium	Capacity
Alashkert	Yerevan (Shengavit)	Alashkert Stadium	6,850
Ararat Yerevan	Yerevan (Kentron); Yerevan (Shengavit)	Vazgen Sargsyan Stadium; Mika Stadium^{1}	14,403; 7,250
Banants	Yerevan (Malatia-Sebastia)	Banants Stadium	4,860
Gandzasar Kapan	Kapan; Yerevan (Kentron)	Gandzasar Stadium; Vazgen Sargsyan Stadium^{2}	3,500; 14,403
Pyunik	Yerevan (Avan)	Football Academy Stadium	1,428
Shirak	Gyumri	Gyumri City Stadium	2,844

- ^{1}Ararat Yerevan moved to the Mika Stadium during the second half of the season.
- ^{2}Gandzasar Kapan moved to the Vazgen Sargsyan Stadium in Yerevan during the second half of the season.

=== Personnel and sponsorship ===
Team	Chairman	Head coach	Captain	Kit manufacturer	Shirt sponsor
Alashkert	(Armenia) Bagrat Navoyan	(Armenia) Abraham Khashmanyan	(Armenia) Vahagn Minasyan	Joma	Bagratour; Huawei
Ararat Yerevan	(Switzerland) Hrach Kaprielyan	(Armenia) Arkady Andreasyan	(Armenia) Rafayel Safaryan	Adidas	
Banants	(Armenia) Hrach Aghabekian	(Armenia) Artur Voskanyan	(Armenia) Stepan Ghazaryan	Adidas	
Gandzasar Kapan	(Armenia) Vahe Hakobyan	(Armenia) Ashot Barseghyan	(Armenia) Aleksandr Petrosyan	Adidas	ZCMC
Pyunik	(Armenia) Rafik Hayrapetyan	(Armenia) Artak Oseyan	(Armenia) Vardan Pogosyan	Nike	Armenian Development Bank
Shirak	(Armenia) Arman Sahakyan	(Armenia) Vardan Bichakhchyan	(Armenia) Gevorg Hovhannisyan	Adidas	menu.am

== League table ==
Pos	Team	Pld	W	D	L	GF	GA	GD	Pts	Qualification
1	Alashkert (C)	30	19	7	4	59	26	+33	64	Qualification for the Champions League first qualifying round
2	Gandzasar Kapan	30	17	6	7	38	24	+14	57	Qualification for the Europa League first qualifying round (Note: Shirak qualified for Europa League first qualifying round by winning the 2016–17 Armenian Cup. However, since they already qualified for European competition based on their league position, the spot awarded to the cup winners was passed down the league.)
3	Shirak	30	16	5	9	31	24	+7	53	Qualification for the Europa League first qualifying round
4	Pyunik	30	12	9	9	35	27	+8	45	Qualification for the Europa League first qualifying round
5	Banants	30	5	6	19	18	44	−26	21	
6	Ararat Yerevan	30	3	3	24	17	53	−36	12	

Source: Football Federation of Armenia (in Armenian), Soccerway
Rules for classification: 1) Points; 2) Play-off (only if deciding champion); 3) Matches won; 4) Head-to-head points; 5) Head-to-head matches won; 6) Head-to-head goal difference; 7) Head-to-head goals scored; 8) Head-to-head away goals scored; 9) Goal difference; 10) Goals scored.
(C) Champions

== Results ==
The league was played in three stages. The six teams played each other six times, three times at home and three times away, for a total of 30 matches per team.

First part of season
Home \ Away	ALA	ARA	BAN	GAN	PYU	SHI
Alashkert	—	1–3	3–0	0–0	0–0	1–1
Ararat Yerevan	1–2	—	0–2	0–2	0–0	0–1
Banants	0–3	1–0	—	4–1	0–1	0–1
Gandzasar Kapan	0–2	2–0	4–0	—	1–0	0–1
Pyunik	1–2	4–0	2–1	3–0	—	0–0
Shirak	2–2	1–0	0–1	1–0	3–1	—

Source: Football Federation of Armenia (in Armenian)
Legend: Blue = home team win; Yellow = draw; Red = away team win.

Second part of season
Home \ Away	ALA	ARA	BAN	GAN	PYU	SHI
Alashkert	—	4–1	4–1	0–4	0–0	3–0
Ararat Yerevan	0–3	—	1–1	0–1	1–2	0–1
Banants	1–2	0–0	—	1–1	0–3	1–2
Gandzasar Kapan	1–2	1–0	1–0	—	2–0	1–0
Pyunik	2–1	3–0	1–1	0–0	—	0–2
Shirak	0–0	2–0	1–0	1–2	0–1	—

Source: Football Federation of Armenia (in Armenian)
Legend: Blue = home team win; Yellow = draw; Red = away team win.

Third part of season
Home \ Away	ALA	ARA	BAN	GAN	PYU	SHI
Alashkert	—	3–1	2–0	1–2	3–3	3–1
Ararat Yerevan	1–4	—	1–0	1–2	1–0	2–3
Banants	0–3	2–1	—	0–0	0–2	0–1
Gandzasar Kapan	0–1	2–1	2–1	—	1–1	3–2
Pyunik	0–3	2–1	0–0	1–2	—	0–2
Shirak	0–1	1–0	1–0	0–0	0–2	—

Source: Football Federation of Armenia (in Armenian)
Legend: Blue = home team win; Yellow = draw; Red = away team win.

== Season statistics ==
=== Top scorers ===
As of 31 May 2017

Rank	Player	Club	Goals
1	(Armenia) Artak Yedigaryan	Alashkert	13
1	(Armenia) Mihran Manasyan	Alashkert	13
3	(Armenia) Gegham Harutyunyan	Gandzasar Kapan	12
4	(Brazil) Claudir	Gandzasar Kapan	8
4	(Armenia) Viulen Ayvazyan	Shirak Gyumri	8
6	(Armenia) Zaven Badoyan	Alashkert	6
6	(Armenia) Artak Dashyan	Alashkert	6
6	(Zambia) Lubambo Musonda	Gandzasar Kapan	5
6	(Brazil) Walmerson Garcia Praia	Gandzasar Kapan	5
6	(Armenia) Alik Arakelyan	Pyunik	5
