= 2015–16 FC Ararat Yerevan season =

Ararat Yerevan
2015–16 season
- Chairman: Hrach Kaprielian
- Manager: Varuzhan Sukiasyan
- Stadium: Hrazdan Stadium; Republican Stadium
- Premier League: 4th
- Armenian Cup: Quarterfinal vs Alashkert
- Top goalscorer: League: Gevorg Nranyan (4); All: Gevorg Nranyan (4)
Home colours	Away colours	Third colours

The 2015–16 season is a FC Ararat Yerevan's 25th consecutive season in Armenian Premier League. This article shows player statistics and all official matches that the club will play during the 2015–16 season.

== Season events ==
In June 2015, former players Zaven Bulut and Stepan Ghazaryan both joined Ararat on trial, as did with Roberto Casabella, Benik Hovhannisyan and Sargis Karapetyan, whilst Juliano Gimenez returned to Ararat after playing for them in 2008. After a successful trial period, Casabella signed with Ararat.

On 14 July 2015, Ararat travelled to Krymsk in Russia to conduct a training camp until 27 July. During the camp, Ararat faced Krasnodar on 15 July, Kuban Krasnodar II on 18 July and Anapa team on 23 July. During this training camp, Brazilian forward Felipe Rafael and Hayk Chilingaryan joined Ararat on trial, whilst Sargis Karapetyan signed permanently after previously being on trial.

On 4 September 2015, Ararat announced that they would be taking in a training camp in California in February 2016, during the seasons winter break.

On 17 September 2015, it was announced that all Ararat's home games would now be played at the Republican Stadium, after their previous home ground, the Hrazdan Stadium, was declared bankrupt.

On 20 February 2016, Ararat where defeated 2-0 by New York Cosmos at the Citrus Stadium in Glendora, California.

== Squad ==
As of match played 22 May 2016

Number	Name	Nationality	Position	Date of birth (age)	Signed from	Signed in	Contract ends	Apps.	Goals
Goalkeepers
1	Gevorg Prazyan	(Armenia)	GK	24 July 1989 (aged 26)	Gandzasar Kapan	2015			
22	Arman Meliksetyan	(Armenia)	GK	21 July 1995 (aged 20)	Banants	2013		7	0
Defenders
2	Vahe Matirosyan	(Armenia)	DF	19 January 1988 (aged 28)	Ulisses	2009			
3	Sergei Avagimyan	(Russia)	DF	5 July 1989 (aged 26)	Baikal Irkutsk	2016		12	0
4	Souleymane Kone	(Ivory Coast)	DF	1 May 1996 (aged 20)	CSKA Sofia	2015		37	1
5	Norayr Grigoryan	(Armenia)	DF	7 January 1983 (aged 33)	Banants	2015			
6	Aram Shahnazaryan	(Armenia)	DF	21 April 1994 (aged 22)	Banants	2016		5	0
18	Gorik Khachatryan	(Armenia)	DF	16 June 1988 (aged 27)	Impuls	2011			
	Karen Khachatryan	(Armenia)	DF	23 June 1997 (aged 18)	Youth team	2014		8	0
Midfielders
7	Benik Hovhannisyan	(Armenia)	MF	1 May 1993 (aged 23)	Alashkert	2015		25	2
11	Bryan de la Fuente	(United States)	MF	1 July 1992 (aged 23)	Los Angeles Misioneros	2014		53	10
15	Marin Glavaš	(Croatia)	MF	17 March 1992 (aged 24)	ViOn Zlaté Moravce	2016		4	0
17	Raffi Kaya	(France)	MF	8 June 1994 (aged 21)	US Ivry	2015		32	0
19	Moisés Orozco	(United States)	MF	6 February 1992 (aged 24)	Dallas City	2015		28	5
21	Giorgi Khubua	(Georgia (country))	MF	19 April 1993 (aged 23)	Merani Martvili	2016		7	0
	Ruslan Avagyan	(Armenia)	MF	24 June 1995 (aged 20)	Youth team	2016		6	0
	Karen Yesayan	(Armenia)	MF	10 April 1996 (aged 20)	Pyunik	2016		2	0
	Pol Asu Oshi	(Nigeria)	MF	27 September 1996 (aged 19)		2016		3	0
Forwards
8	Mher Sahakyan	(Armenia)	FW	15 July 1995 (aged 20)	Impuls	2013		44	2
9	Gevorg Nranyan	(Armenia)	FW	9 March 1986 (aged 30)	Banants	2015			
10	Oumarou Kaina	(Cameroon)	FW	16 October 1996 (aged 19)	Aspire Academy	2015		35	2
14	David Ghandilyan	(Armenia)	FW	4 June 1993 (aged 22)	Shirak	2014		11	0
20	Christian Chaney	(United States)	FW	8 September 1994 (aged 21)	Fresno Fuego	2016		1	0
23	Kyrian Nwabueze	(Nigeria)	FW	11 December 1992 (aged 23)	Tulsa Roughnecks	2016		11	1
	Mikael Arustamyan	(Armenia)	FW	18 January 1996 (aged 20)	Banants	2016		0	0
	Arayik Mkrtchyan	(Armenia)	FW	8 July 1993 (aged 22)	Youth team	2014		10	0
Away on loan
Left during the season
3	Juliano Gimenez	(Brazil)	DF	4 December 1984 (aged 31)	Mamoré	2015			
7	Aleksandar Rakić	(Serbia)	FW	7 January 1987 (aged 29)	Cement Beočin	2013		64	22
10	Areg Azatyan	(Armenia)	MF	29 June 1990 (aged 25)	Banants	2015		16	1
20	Zaven Bulut	(France)	MF	5 February 1992 (aged 24)	Euga Ardziv	2014		28	5
23	Carlo Chueca	(Peru)	MF	23 March 1993 (aged 23)	Chivas USA	2015		19	3
23	David Hovsepyan	(Armenia)	FW	15 January 1991 (aged 25)	Youth team	2015		6	1
25	Hayk Chilingaryan	(Armenia)	DF	1 February 1989 (aged 27)	Alashkert	2015		6	0
88	Aram Ayrapetyan	(Armenia)	GK	22 November 1986 (aged 29)	Banants	2015		13	0
97	Tamaz Avdalyan	(Ukraine)	FW	3 February 1994 (aged 22)	Youth team	2015		1	0
	Sargis Karapetyan	(Armenia)	MF	24 April 1990 (aged 26)	Mika	2015		2	0

== Transfers ==
=== In ===
Date	Position	Nationality	Name	From	Fee	Ref.
Summer 2015	GK	(Armenia)	Gevorg Prazyan	Gandzasar Kapan	Undisclosed	
Summer 2015	MF	(Armenia)	Norayr Grigoryan	Unattached	Free	
Summer 2015	FW	(Armenia)	Gevorg Nranyan	Banants	Undisclosed	
June 2015	MF	(Armenia)	Benik Hovhannisyan	Alashkert	Undisclosed	
June 2015	MF	(France)	Zaven Bulut	Unattached	Free	
25 June 2015	DF	(Brazil)	Juliano Gimenez	Mamoré	Undisclosed	
26 June 2015	MF	(Spain)	Roberto Casabella	San Fernando	Undisclosed	
14 July 2015	MF	(Armenia)	Sargis Karapetyan	Mika	Undisclosed	
1 January 2016	FW	(Armenia)	Mikael Arustamyan	Banants	Undisclosed	
14 January 2016	MF	(Georgia (country))	Giorgi Khubua	Merani Martvili	Undisclosed	
24 January 2016	DF	(Armenia)	Aram Shahnazaryan	Banants	Undisclosed	
24 January 2016	DF	(Armenia)	Artyom Khachaturov	Kyzylzhar	Undisclosed	
30 January 2016	DF	(Russia)	Sergei Avagimyan	Baikal Irkutsk	Undisclosed	
24 February 2016	MF	(Croatia)	Marin Glavaš	ViOn Zlaté	Undisclosed	
24 February 2016	FW	(Nigeria)	Kyrian Nwabueze	Tulsa Roughnecks	Undisclosed	
24 February 2016	FW	(United States)	Christian Chaney	Fresno Fuego	Undisclosed	
1 March 2016	MF	(Nigeria)	Pol Asu Oshi	Unattached	Free	

=== Released ===
Date	Position	Nationality	Name	Joined	Date	Ref.
6 August 2015	MF	(Spain)	Roberto Casabella	Rayo Cantabria	6 August 2015	
15 September 2015	MF	(Armenia)	Aleksandar Rakić	Gandzasar Kapan	12 January 2016	
31 December 2015	GK	(Armenia)	Aram Ayrapetyan	Ararat Yerevan	2 August 2016	
31 December 2015	DF	(Armenia)	Mikheil Simonyan			
31 December 2015	DF	(Brazil)	Juliano Gimenez	Flamengo de Guarulhos		
31 December 2015	MF	(Armenia)	Davit Hovsepyan			
31 December 2015	MF	(Armenia)	Sargis Karapetyan	CSKA Pamir Dushanbe	March 2017	
31 December 2015	MF	(France)	Zaven Bulut			
31 December 2015	MF	(Peru)	Carlo Chueca			
31 December 2015	MF	(Ukraine)	Tamaz Avdalyan			
10 January 2016	GK	(Armenia)	Areg Azatyan	Alashkert		
10 January 2016	GK	(Armenia)	Levon Minasyan	Alashkert		
10 January 2016	DF	(Armenia)	Hayk Chilingaryan			
7 February 2016	DF	(Armenia)	Artyom Khachaturov	Zaria Bălți	16 February 2016	
30 June 2016	DF	(Armenia)	Aram Shakhnazaryan	Pyunik	1 August 2016	
30 June 2016	MF	(Armenia)	Benik Hovhannisyan	Alashkert	31 July 2016	
30 June 2016	MF	(Armenia)	Karen Yesayan	Retired		
30 June 2016	MF	(Croatia)	Marin Glavaš	Celje	8 July 2016	
30 June 2016	MF	(Georgia (country))	Giorgi Khubua	Zugdidi		
30 June 2016	MF	(United States)	Bryan de la Fuente	Shirak	3 September 2016	
30 June 2016	MF	(United States)	Moisés Orozco			
30 June 2016	FW	(Armenia)	Arayik Mkrtchyan			
30 June 2016	FW	(United States)	Christian Chaney	Sacramento Republic	12 August 2016	

=== Trialists ===
Date From	Position	Nationality	Name	Previous club	Date To	Ref.
20 June 2015	GK	(Armenia)	Stepan Ghazaryan	Banants		
20 June 2015	MF	(Armenia)	Benik Hovhannisyan	Alashkert		
20 June 2015	MF	(Armenia)	Sargis Karapetyan	Mika		
20 June 2015	MF	(Spain)	Roberto Casabella	San Fernando	26 June 2015	
25 June 2015	MF	(France)	Zaven Bulut	Ararat Yerevan		
14 July 2015	DF	(Armenia)	Hayk Chilingaryan	Alashkert		
14 July 2015	FW	(Brazil)	Felipe Rafael	Parnahyba		
Winter 2016	DF	(United States)	Lee Nishanian	LA Galaxy II		
Winter 2016	MF	(United States)	Hagop Chirishian	New York Cosmos		

== Friendlies ==
15 July 2015	Krasnodar (Russia)	1 – 0	(Armenia) Ararat Yerevan	Krasnodar, Russia
(UTC+4)	Ari 20'	Report		Stadium: Krasnodar Training Ground

July 2015	Kuban Krasnodar (Russia)	3 – 2	(Armenia) Ararat Yerevan	Krasnodar, Russia
(UTC+4)	Goal	Report	Goal	Stadium: Krasnodar Training Ground

22 July 2015	Anapa (Russia)	1 – 2	(Armenia) Ararat Yerevan	Krasnodar, Russia
(UTC+4)	Goal	Report	Chueca; Hovhannisyan	Stadium: Krasnodar Training Ground

16 January 2016	Shirak (Armenia)	1 – 0	(Armenia) Ararat Yerevan
(UTC+4)	Diarrassouba	Summary

22 January 2016	Shirak (Armenia)	–	(Armenia) Ararat Yerevan
(UTC+4)		[ Summary]

27 January 2016	Ararat Yerevan (Armenia)	0 – 1	(Russia) SKA-Energiya Khabarovsk	Sochi, Russia
(UTC+4)		Summary	Bazelyuk 30'

31 January 2016	Ararat Yerevan (Armenia)	0 – 2	(Russia) Baltika Kaliningrad	Sochi, Russia
(UTC+4)		Summary	Zemlyanskiy 77'; Postanogov 90'

3 February 2016	Ararat Yerevan (Armenia)	1 – 1	(Russia) Torpedo Armavir	Sochi, Russia
(UTC+4)	O.Kaina 56'	Summary	Goal

19 February 2016	Fresno Fuego (United States)	0 – 1	(Armenia) Ararat Yerevan	Fresno, United States
06:30 (UTC+4)		Report	D.Hovsepyan 42'; G.Khachatryan (red card) 44'	Stadium: Chukchansi Park

20 February 2016	New York Cosmos (United States)	2 – 0	(Armenia) Ararat Yerevan	Glendora, United States
(UTC+4)	Ayoze (yellow card) 28'; Mkosana 36'; Guenzatti 69'	Report	(yellow card) 54'	Stadium: Citrus Stadium

24 February 2016	Seongnam (South Korea)	4 – 3	(Armenia) Ararat Yerevan	Glendora, United States
(UTC+4)	N.Grigoryan (o.g.)	Report	Rivas; Chaney; G.Nranyan	Stadium: Citrus College Stadium

== Competitions ==
=== Premier League ===
==== Results summary ====
Overall								Home						Away					
Pld	W	D	L	GF	GA	GD	Pts	W	D	L	GF	GA	GD	W	D	L	GF	GA	GD
28	9	10	9	28	31	−3	37	3	5	6	14	20	−6	6	5	3	14	11	+3

==== Results by round ====
Round	1	2	3	4	5	6	7	8	9	10	11	12	13	14	15	16	17	18	19	20	21	22	23	24	25	26	27	28
Ground	H	A	H	A	H	H	A	A	H	A	H	A	A	H	H	A	H	A	H	H	A	A	H	A	H	A	A	H
Result	W	W	D	L	L	L	L	W	W	W	D	D	W	D	W	D	L	D	D	D	D	W	L	D	L	W	L	L
Position	1	1	2	5	5	5	7	6	5	5	5	5	5	4	3	3	4	4	5	5	5	4	5	5	5	5	5	5

Updated to match(es) played on 23 May 2016. Source: Soccerway
A = Away; H = Home; W = Win; D = Draw; L = Loss

==== Results ====
2 August 2015 1	Ararat Yerevan	2 – 0	Ulisses	Yerevan
17:30 (UTC+4)	Chueca 60'; Orozco 84'	Summary	Torrejón (yellow card) 12'; Chimakadze (yellow card) 57'; Harutyunyan (yellow card) 90+2'	Stadium: Hrazdan Stadium; Attendance: 200; Referee: Artur Safaryan

9 August 2015 2	Mika	0 – 1	Ararat Yerevan	Yerevan
18:00 (UTC+4)	Kosachev (yellow card) 30'; Kvekveskiri (yellow card) 52'	Summary	de la Fuente 63'; Rakić (yellow card) 75'	Stadium: Mika Stadium; Attendance: 300; Referee: Zaven Hovhannisyan

16 August 2015 3	Ararat Yerevan	1 – 1	Pyunik	Yerevan
19:00 (UTC+4)	Nranyan (yellow card) 11'; Rakić 27'; Martirosyan (yellow card) 72'	Summary	Gh.Poghosyan 80'; Ro.Hakobyan (yellow card) 81'	Stadium: Hrazdan Stadium; Attendance: 500; Referee: Suren Baliyan

23 August 2015 4	Banants	3 – 0	Ararat Yerevan	Yerevan
17:00 (UTC+4)	Jeremiah 2'; López 23' (yellow card) 49'; Harutyunyan (yellow card) 44'; Minasyan 70'; Manucharyan (yellow card) 89'	Summary	Martirosyan (yellow card) 45'	Stadium: Banants Stadium; Attendance: 600; Referee: Suren Baliyan

29 August 2015 5	Ararat Yerevan	1 – 2	Alashkert	Yerevan
17:30 (UTC+4)	Grigoryan (yellow card) 28'; Bulut 35' (yellow card) 36'; Kone (yellow card) 45'	Summary	Manasyan 42'; Grigoryan (yellow card) 44'; Héber 50' (pen.); Ghazaryan (yellow card) 73'; Dukić (yellow card) 86'	Stadium: Yerevan Football Academy Stadium; Attendance: 500; Referee: Artur Simonyan

12 September 2015 6	Ararat Yerevan	0 – 2	Shirak	Yerevan
17:30 (UTC+4)	Nranyan (yellow card) 69' de la Fuente (yellow card) 86'	Summary	Hakobyan 16'; Malakyan 47'; G. Hovhannisyan (yellow card) 71'; Elyazyan (yellow card) 81'	Stadium: Vazgen Sargsyan Republican Stadium; Attendance: 400; Referee: Artur Simonyan

20 September 2015 7	Gandzasar	1 – 0	Ararat Yerevan	Kapan
17:00 (UTC+4)	Beglaryan (yellow card) 42'; Barseghyan 66'; Gogatishvili (yellow card) 85'	Summary	Kaina (yellow card) 77'; Bulut (yellow card) 86'	Stadium: Gandzasar Stadium; Attendance: 750; Referee: Zaven Hovhannisyan

26 September 2015 8	Ulisses	1 – 2	Ararat Yerevan	Yerevan
17:30 (UTC+4)	Ivanović 15'; A.Kalmanov (yellow card) 90+2'	Summary	de la Fuente 66', 86'	Stadium: Vazgen Sargsyan Republican Stadium; Attendance: 200; Referee: Edgar Sahakyan

5 October 2015 9	Ararat Yerevan	2 – 1	Mika	Yerevan
18:00 (UTC+4)	Nranyan 24', 27'; Hovhannisyan (yellow card) 81'; Prazyan (yellow card) 83'	Summary	Melkonyan 2'; Balayan (yellow card) 26'; Talalay (yellow card) 45'	Stadium: Republican Stadium; Attendance: 200; Referee: Zaven Hovhannisyan

18 October 2015 10	Pyunik	0 – 1	Ararat Yerevan	Yerevan
16:00 (UTC+4)	Manoyan (red card) 61'; Yuspashyan (yellow card) 69'; Hovhannisyan (yellow card) 76'; Hayrapetyan (yellow card) 82'	Summary	Nranyan 6' (yellow card) 80'; Chueca (yellow card) 40'; Kaina (yellow card) 82' de la Fuente (yellow card) 90+1'	Stadium: Yerevan Football Academy Stadium; Attendance: 500; Referee: Artur Simonyan

24 October 2015 11	Ararat Yerevan	0 – 0	Banants	Yerevan
14:00 (UTC+4)		Summary		Stadium: Republican Stadium; Attendance: 150; Referee: Arman Alaberkyan

31 October 2015 12	Alashkert	1 – 1	Ararat Yerevan	Yerevan
14:00 (UTC+4)	Yedigaryan (yellow card) 43'; Manasyan 50'; Voskanyan (yellow card) 68'	Summary	Nranyan 41' (yellow card) 48'; Kaya (yellow card) 43'	Stadium: Alashkert Stadium; Attendance: 200; Referee: Artur Safaryan

8 November 2015 13	Shirak	0 – 1	Ararat Yerevan	Gyumri
15:00 (UTC+4)	Hakobyan (yellow card) 47'; Muradyan (yellow card) 85'; Ayvazyan (yellow card) 90'	Summary	Kone (yellow card) 28'; Hovhannisyan 44'; Kaina (yellow card) 50'; Grigoryan (yellow card) 85'	Stadium: Gyumri City Stadium; Attendance: 700; Referee: Suren Baliyan

21 November 2015 14	Ararat Yerevan	2 – 2	Gandzasar	Yerevan
14:00 (UTC+4)	Hovsepyan 26'; Kone (yellow card) 66'; Orozco 90+4'	Summary	Arm.Petrosyan (yellow card) 5'; Beglaryan 21'; Gogatishvili 55'; A.Hovhannisyan (yellow card) 88'	Stadium: Republican Stadium; Attendance: 400; Referee: Suren Baliyan

28 November 2015 15	Ararat Yerevan	3 – 1	Ulisses	Yerevan
14:00 (UTC+4)	Hunanyan 12' (o.g.); Nranyan 42' de la Fuente (yellow card) 47'; Sahakyan 60'	Summary	Hunanyan (yellow card) 35'; Avetisyan 90+2'	Stadium: Republican Stadium; Attendance: 100; Referee: Artur Safaryan

3 March 2016 16	Mika	1 – 1	Ararat Yerevan	Yerevan
14:00 (UTC+4)	Melkonyan 5'; Dmitry Lushnikov (yellow card) 81'	Summary	O.Kaina (yellow card) 26' (goal) 31'; N.Grigoryan (yellow card) 40'; Kone (yellow card) 44'; V.Martirosyan (yellow card) 72'	Stadium: Mika Stadium; Attendance: 700; Referee: Artur Safaryan

13 March 2016 17	Ararat Yerevan	1 – 2	Pyunik	Yerevan
16:00 (UTC+4)	Glavaš (yellow card) 3'; G.Khachatryan (yellow card) 55'; N.Grigoryan 69'	Summary	A.Arakelyan (yellow card) 22'; A.Manucharyan 36'; A.Kartashyan 57'; Haroyan (yellow card) 61'	Stadium: Republican Stadium; Attendance: 500; Referee: Suren Baliyan

20 March 2016 18	Banants	2 – 2	Ararat Yerevan	Yerevan
14:00 (UTC+4)	Laércio 19'; Badoyan 21'; H. Hakobyan (yellow card) 61'	Summary	M.Orozco 9' (pen.); Avagimyan (yellow card) 29' de la Fuente 48'; O.Kaina (yellow card) 78'; V.Martirosyan (yellow card) 87'	Stadium: Banants Stadium; Referee: Artur Safaryan

2 April 2016 19	Ararat Yerevan	1 – 1	Shirak	Yerevan
14:00 (UTC+4)	G.Nranyan (yellow card) 47' de la Fuente 78'	Summary	A.Hovhannisyan (yellow card) 12'; D.Diarrassouba 70'; Stošković (yellow card) 90'	Stadium: Republican Stadium; Referee: Artur Simonyan

6 April 2016 20	Ararat Yerevan	0 – 0	Alashkert	Yerevan
14:00 (UTC+4)	de la Fuente (yellow card) 45'; G.Khachatryan (yellow card) 47'	Summary	Voskanyan (yellow card) 67'; Gyozalyan (yellow card) 90+3'	Stadium: Republican Stadium; Attendance: 250; Referee: Zaven Hovhannisyan

10 April 2016 21	Gandzasar	0 – 0	Ararat Yerevan	Kapan
16:00 (UTC+4)	A.Petrosyan (yellow card) 90+3'	Summary	R.Avagyan (yellow card) 74'; O.Kaina (yellow card) 82'; G.Khachatryan (yellow card) 90'	Stadium: Gandzasar Stadium; Attendance: 1,500; Referee: Artur Safaryan

17 April 2016 22	Ulisses	0 – 3	Ararat Yerevan	Yerevan
(UTC+4)		[ Summary]		Stadium: Vazgen Sargsyan Republican Stadium

23 April 2016 23	Ararat Yerevan	0 – 4	Mika	Yerevan
19:00 (UTC+4)	de la Fuente (yellow card) 41'; V.Martirosyan (yellow card) 54'; R.Kaya (yellow card) 76'; Avagimyan (yellow card) 85'	Summary	Gorelishvili 17'; Chicherin 46'; Kiselyov 55' (yellow card) 65'; H.Voskanyan 86'	Stadium: Republican Stadium; Attendance: 100; Referee: Suren Baliyan

30 April 2016 24	Pyunik	0 – 0	Ararat Yerevan	Yerevan
19:00 (UTC+4)		Summary	Avagimyan (yellow card) 24'; R.Kaya (yellow card) 36' (yellow-red card) 71'; B.Hovhannisyan (yellow card) 83'; Nwabueze (yellow card) 86'	Stadium: Yerevan Football Academy Stadium; Attendance: 500; Referee: Artak Simonyan

8 May 2016 25	Ararat Yerevan	1 – 2	Banants	Yerevan
19:00 (UTC+4)	O.Kaina (yellow card) 32'; Nwabueze 50'	Summary	O.Oganisyan (yellow card) 28'; N.Minasyan 42'; Burayev 85'; Laércio (yellow card) 88'	Stadium: Republican Stadium; Attendance: 200; Referee: Artur Safaryan

14 May 2016 26	Alashkert	0 – 1	Ararat Yerevan	Yerevan
17:00 (UTC+4)	G.Poghosyan (yellow card) 60'; Gyozalyan (yellow card) 62'; A.Hovsepyan (yellow card) 79'	Summary	Kone 81' de la Fuente (yellow card) 85'; A.Meliksetyan (yellow card) 90+2'	Stadium: Alashkert Stadium; Attendance: 600; Referee: Gevorg Eghoyan

18 May 2016 27	Ararat Yerevan	0 – 2	Gandzasar	Yerevan
17:00 (UTC+4)	V.Martirosyan (yellow card) 10'; R.Kaya (yellow card) 90+2'	Summary	T.Barseghyan 11' (yellow card) 43'; G.Harutyunyan 77'	Stadium: Republican Stadium; Attendance: 250; Referee: Artur Safaryan

22 May 2016 28	Shirak	2 – 1	Ararat Yerevan	Gyumri
17:00 (UTC+4)	K.Kouakou (yellow card) 41'; A.Hovhannisyan 60'; G. Hovhannisyan 67'; M.Kaba (yellow card) 81'	Summary	B.Hovhannisyan 57'; N.Grigoryan (yellow card) 90+4'	Stadium: Gyumri City Stadium; Attendance: 700; Referee: Artur Simonyan

==== Table ====
Pos	Team	Pld	W	D	L	GF	GA	GD	Pts	Qualification or relegation
3	Pyunik	28	13	9	6	44	21	+23	48	Qualification for the Europa League first qualifying round
4	Gandzasar Kapan	28	11	12	5	35	27	+8	45	
5	Ararat Yerevan	28	9	10	9	28	31	−3	37	
6	Banants	28	7	12	9	36	34	+2	33	Qualification for the Europa League first qualifying round (Note: Banants qualified for the Europa League first qualifying round by winning the 2015–16 Armenian Cup.)
7	Mika	28	9	5	14	30	32	−2	32	

Source: Football Federation of Armenia, Soccerway
Rules for classification: 1) Points; 2) Play-off (only if deciding champion); 3) Matches won; 4) Head-to-head points; 5) Head-to-head matches won; 6) Head-to-head goal difference; 7) Head-to-head goals scored; 8) Head-to-head away goals scored; 9) Goal difference; 10) Goals scored.

=== Armenian Cup ===
28 October 2015 Quarterfinal 1st leg	Alashkert	1 – 0	Ararat Yerevan	Yerevan
15:00 (UTC+4)	Manasyan 17'; Yedigaryan (yellow card) 72'	Summary	Grigoryan (yellow card) 32'; Bulut (yellow card) 90+1'	Stadium: Alashkert Stadium; Attendance: 300; Referee: Artur Simonyan

25 November 2015 Quarterfinal 2nd leg	Ararat Yerevan	0 – 4 (0 – 5 agg.)	Alashkert	Yerevan
14:30 (UTC+4)	Grigoryan (yellow card) 32'; Orozco (yellow card) 30'; Hovsepyan (yellow card) 37'	Summary	Minasyan (yellow card) 29'; Voskanyan (yellow card) 38'; Héber 41', 58'; Manasyan 49'; Balabekyan 84'	Stadium: Vazgen Sargsyan Republican Stadium; Attendance: 300; Referee: Zaven Hovhannisyan

== Statistics ==
As of match played 22 May 2016

=== Appearances and goals ===
No.	Pos	Nat	Player	Total		Premier League		Armenian Cup	
No.	Pos	Nat	Player	Apps	Goals	Apps	Goals	Apps	Goals
1	GK	(Armenia) ARM	Gevorg Prazyan	23	0	21	0	2	0
2	DF	(Armenia) ARM	Vahe Martirosyan	27	0	24+1	0	2	0
3	DF	(Russia) RUS	Sergei Avagimyan	12	0	12	0	0	0
4	DF	(Ivory Coast) CIV	Souleymane Kone	27	1	25	1	2	0
5	DF	(Armenia) ARM	Norayr Grigoryan	28	1	26	1	2	0
6	DF	(Armenia) ARM	Aram Shakhnazaryan	5	0	2+3	0	0	0
7	MF	(Armenia) ARM	Benik Hovhannisyan	25	2	19+4	2	2	0
8	FW	(Armenia) ARM	Mher Sahakyan	19	1	1+17	1	0+1	0
9	FW	(Armenia) ARM	Gevorg Nranyan	25	5	19+4	5	2	0
10	FW	(Cameroon) CMR	Oumarou Kaina	26	1	24	1	2	0
11	MF	(United States) USA	Bryan de la Fuente	28	5	26	5	2	0
14	DF	(Armenia) ARM	David Ghandilyan	3	0	0+3	0	0	0
15	MF	(Croatia) CRO	Marin Glavaš	4	0	3+1	0	0	0
17	MF	(France) FRA	Raffi Kaya	21	0	16+3	0	2	0
18	DF	(Armenia) ARM	Gorik Khachatryan	22	0	19+2	0	1	0
19	MF	(United States) USA	Moisés Orozco	15	3	10+3	3	2	0
20	FW	(United States) USA	Christian Chaney	1	0	0+1	0	0	0
21	MF	(Georgia (country)) GEO	Giorgi Khubua	7	0	7	0	0	0
22	GK	(Armenia) ARM	Arman Meliksetyan	3	0	3	0	0	0
23	FW	(Nigeria) NGR	Kyrian Nwabueze	11	1	8+3	1	0	0
	MF	(Armenia) ARM	Ruslan Avagyan	6	0	1+5	0	0	0
	MF	(Armenia) ARM	Karen Yesayan	2	0	0+2	0	0	0
	MF	(Nigeria) NGR	Pol Asu Oshi	3	0	0+3	0	0	0
Players who left Ararat Yerevan during the season:
3	DF	(Brazil) BRA	Juliano Gimenez	6	0	6	0	0	0
7	FW	(Serbia) SRB	Aleksandar Rakić	6	1	5+1	1	0	0
10	MF	(Armenia) ARM	Areg Azatyan	5	0	1+2	0	0+2	0
20	MF	(France) FRA	Zaven Bulut	16	1	10+4	1	0+2	0
23	MF	(Peru) PER	Carlo Chueca	8	1	4+4	1	0	0
23	FW	(Armenia) ARM	David Hovsepyan	6	1	1+4	1	1	0
25	DF	(Armenia) ARM	Hayk Chilingaryan	6	0	1+5	0	0	0
88	GK	(Armenia) ARM	Aram Ayrapetyan	4	0	3	0	0+1	0
97	FW	(Ukraine) UKR	Tamaz Avdalyan	1	0	0+1	0	0	0
	MF	(Armenia) ARM	Sargis Karapetyan	2	0	0+2	0	0	0

=== Goal scorers ===
Place	Position	Nation	Number	Name	Premier League	Armenian Cup	Total
1	FW	(Armenia)	9	Gevorg Nranyan	5	0	5
1	MF	(United States)	11	Bryan de la Fuente	5	0	5
3	MF	(United States)	19	Moisés Orozco	3	0	3
4	MF	(Armenia)	7	Benik Hovhannisyan	2	0	2
5	MF	(Peru)	23	Carlo Chueca	1	0	1
5	FW	(Serbia)	7	Aleksandar Rakić	1	0	1
5	MF	(France)	20	Zaven Bulut	1	0	1
5	MF	(Armenia)	23	David Hovsepyan	1	0	1
5	MF	(Armenia)	8	Mher Sahakyan	1	0	1
5	FW	(Cameroon)	10	Oumarou Kaina	1	0	1
5	DF	(Armenia)	5	Norayr Grigoryan	1	0	1
5	FW	(Nigeria)	23	Kyrian Nwabueze	1	0	1
5	DF	(Ivory Coast)	4	Souleymane Kone	1	0	1
				TOTALS	24	0	24

=== Clean sheets ===
Place	Position	Nation	Number	Name	Premier League	Armenian Cup	Total
1	GK	(Armenia)	1	Gevorg Prazyan	7	0	7
2	GK	(Armenia)	88	Aram Ayrapetyan	1	0	1
2	GK	(Armenia)	22	Arman Meliksetyan	1	0	1
				TOTALS	9	0	9

=== Disciplinary record ===
Number	Nation	Position	Name	Premier League		Armenian Cup		Total	
Number	Nation	Position	Name	Yellow card	Red card	Yellow card	Red card	Yellow card	Red card
1	(Armenia)	GK	Gevorg Prazyan	1	0	0	0	1	0
2	(Armenia)	DF	Vahe Martirosyan	6	0	0	0	6	0
3	(Russia)	DF	Sergei Avagimyan	3	0	0	0	3	0
4	(Ivory Coast)	DF	Souleymane Kone	4	0	0	0	4	0
5	(Armenia)	DF	Norayr Grigoryan	4	0	1	0	5	0
7	(Armenia)	MF	Benik Hovhannisyan	2	0	0	0	2	0
9	(Armenia)	FW	Gevorg Nranyan	5	0	1	0	6	0
10	(Cameroon)	FW	Oumarou Kaina	7	0	0	0	7	0
11	(United States)	MF	Bryan de la Fuente	6	0	0	0	6	0
15	(Croatia)	MF	Marin Glavaš	1	0	0	0	1	0
17	(France)	MF	Raffi Kaya	5	1	0	0	5	1
18	(Armenia)	DF	Gorik Khachatryan	3	0	0	0	3	0
19	(United States)	MF	Moisés Orozco	0	0	1	0	1	0
22	(Armenia)	GK	Arman Meliksetyan	1	0	0	0	1	0
23	(Nigeria)	FW	Kyrian Nwabueze	1	0	0	0	1	0
	(Armenia)	MF	Ruslan Avagyan	1	0	0	0	1	0
Players who left Ararat Yerevan during the season:
7	(Serbia)	FW	Aleksandar Rakić	1	0	0	0	1	0
20	(France)	MF	Zaven Bulut	2	0	1	0	3	0
23	(Peru)	MF	Carlo Chueca	1	0	0	0	1	0
23	(Armenia)	MF	David Hovsepyan	0	0	1	0	1	0
			TOTALS	54	1	5	0	59	1
