= 2015–16 FC Alashkert season =

Alashkert
2015-16 season
- Chairman: Bagrat Navoyan
- Manager: Abraham Khashmanyan
- Stadium: Alashkert Stadium
- Premier League: 1st
- Armenian Cup: Semifinal vs Banants
- Europa League: Second Qualifying Round vs Kairat
- Top goalscorer: League: Two Players (16); All: Héber (20)

The 2015–16 season was Alashkert's fourth season in the Armenian Premier League and 9th overall. It was their second season under the management of Abraham Khashmanyan, and they ended the season as champions of the Armenian Premier League for the first time, reached the Semifinals of the Armenian Cup and the second qualifying round of the UEFA Europa League.

== Season events ==
On 2 July, Alashkert played in their first ever UEFA competition, taking on Scottish side St Johnstone in the first qualifying round of the 2015–16 UEFA Europa League. A goal on the hour from Mihran Manasyan was enough to ensure Alashkert's first win in the competition. The following week, Alashkert traveled to McDiarmid Park for the second leg, where a 73rd-minute goal from Norayr Gyozalyan gave Alashkert a vital away goal, as they lost the game 2–1, but progressed to the second qualifying round on the Away goals rule. In the second qualifying round, Alashkert faced FC Kairat from Kazakhstan, losing the first leg of the tie 3–0 in Almaty. In the second leg, goals from Ararat Arakelyan and Héber saw Alashkert win the game 2–1, but eliminated from the competition with a 2–4 aggregate defeat.

On 18 August, Artak Yedigaryan signed a one-year contract with Alashkert.

In January 2016, Alashkert announced the signing of Richard Cardozo from Maltese club Naxxar Lions.

In February 2016, Alashkert signed Artur Yedigaryan to a two-year contract after he'd left Dinamo Minsk.

== Squad ==
Note: Flags indicate national team as defined under FIFA eligibility rules; some limited exceptions apply. Players may hold more than one non-FIFA nationality.

No.	Pos.	Nation	Player
1	GK	ARM	Gevorg Kasparov (vice-captain)
2	DF	MLI	Sékou Fofana
3	DF	ARM	Tigran Hakhnazaryan
4	DF	ARM	Andranik Voskanyan
5	MF	ARM	Karen Muradyan
6	DF	ARM	Ararat Arakelyan
7	FW	ARM	Mihran Manasyan
8	MF	ARM	Gagik Poghosyan
9	FW	BRA	Héber (on loan from Coimbra)
10	MF	ARM	Khoren Veranyan
11	MF	ARM	Arsen Balabekyan
12	GK	ARM	Sevak Aghabekyan
13	DF	ARM	Gevorg Poghosyan
14	MF	ARM	Aram Bareghamyan

No.	Pos.	Nation	Player
15	MF	ARM	Aram Hovsepyan
17	DF	ARM	Artak Yedigaryan
18	MF	ARM	Aram Loretsyan
19	DF	ARM	Vahagn Minasyan (captain)
21	MF	ARM	Artak Grigoryan
22	FW	ARM	Norayr Gyozalyan
24	MF	ARM	Davit Minasyan
25	FW	ARM	Vardan Bakalyan
55	GK	ARM	Edvard Hovhannisyan
88	GK	ARM	Levon Minasyan
—	MF	ARM	Rafael Ghazaryan
—	DF	ARM	Artur Avagyan
—	MF	ARM	Artur Yedigaryan
—	MF	ARM	Areg Azatyan

== Transfers ==
=== In ===
Date	Position	Nationality	Name	From	Fee	Ref.
Summer 2015	GK	(Armenia)	Gevorg Kasparov	Mika	Undisclosed	
Summer 2015	DF	(Armenia)	Andranik Voskanyan	Mika	Undisclosed	
Summer 2015	MF	(Armenia)	Artak Grigoryan	Mika	Undisclosed	
1 July 2015	DF	(Armenia)	Gevorg Poghosyan	Mika	Undisclosed	
1 July 2015	MF	(Armenia)	Rafael Ghazaryan	Mika	Undisclosed	
30 July 2015	MF	(Armenia)	Aram Loretsyan	Banants	Undisclosed	
30 July 2015	MF	(Armenia)	Davit Minasyan	Mika	Undisclosed	
30 July 2015	FW	(Armenia)	Vardan Bakalyan	Pyunik	Undisclosed	
18 August 2015	MF	(Armenia)	Artak Yedigaryan	Žalgiris	Undisclosed	
11 January 2016	MF	(Armenia)	Artur Avagyan	Gandzasar Kapan	Undisclosed	
20 January 2016	DF	(Armenia)	Gagik Poghosyan	Pyunik	Undisclosed	
22 January 2016	MF	(Australia)	Richard Cardozo	Naxxar Lions	Undisclosed	
11 February 2016	MF	(Armenia)	Artur Yedigaryan	Dinamo Minsk	Free	

=== Loans in ===
Date from	Position	Nationality	Name	From	Date to	Ref.
Summer 2015	FW	(Brazil)	Héber	Coimbra	End of season	

=== Released ===
Date	Position	Nationality	Name	Joined	Date	Ref.
Summer 2015	MF	(Belarus)	Stanislav Gnedko	Smorgon	15 July 2015	
Summer 2015	MF	(Bosnia and Herzegovina)	Dušan Mladenović	Željezničar Sarajevo		
Winter 2016	DF	(Belarus)	Sergey Usenya	Gorodeya	13 January 2016	
Winter 2016	MF	(Serbia)	Duško Dukić	Bylis Ballsh		
Winter 2016	MF	(Australia)	Richard Cardozo	Manly United		
30 June 2016	GK	(Armenia)	Sevak Aghabekyan	Aragats	1 August 2019	
30 June 2016	GK	(Armenia)	Levon Minasyan	Retired	1 January 2017	
30 June 2016	DF	(Mali)	Sékou Fofana	Retired	30 June 2016	

== Competitions ==
=== Premier League ===
==== Results summary ====
Overall								Home						Away					
Pld	W	D	L	GF	GA	GD	Pts	W	D	L	GF	GA	GD	W	D	L	GF	GA	GD
28	16	7	5	50	24	+26	55	9	2	3	28	11	+17	7	5	2	22	13	+9

Last updated: 18 May 2016.
Source: See Results

==== Results ====
1 August 2015 1	Pyunik	1 – 2	Alashkert	Yerevan
19:00 (UTC+4)	Haroyan 12'; Voskanyan (yellow card) 73'; V.Pogosyan (yellow card) 78'	Report	Héber 22', 82' (pen.) (yellow card) 56'; K.Veranyan (yellow card) 45'	Stadium: Yerevan Football Academy; Attendance: 800; Referee: Zaven Hovhannisyan

8 August 2015 2	Alashkert	0 – 0	Gandzasar Kapan	Yerevan
17:30 (UTC+4)	K.Veranyan (yellow card) 34'; Arakelyan (yellow card) 51'	Report	Arm.Petrosyan (yellow card) 6'; Ale.Petrosyan (yellow card) 67'; Burayev (yellow card) 87'	Stadium: Alashkert Stadium; Attendance: 1,000; Referee: Suren Baliyan

16 August 2015 3	Banants	2 – 2	Alashkert	Yerevan
19:00 (UTC+4)	K.Harutyunyan (yellow card) 10'; Jeremiah 16', 50'; A.Shakhnazaryan (yellow card) 59'	Report	Dukić 8'; S.Fofana (yellow card) 43'; M.Manasyan 62' (yellow card) 86'	Stadium: Banants Stadium; Attendance: 200; Referee: Zaven Hovhannisyan

22 August 2015 4	Alashkert	4 – 0	Ulisses	Yerevan
17:30 (UTC+4)	V.Minasyan (yellow card) 23'; M.Manasyan 54'; A.Loretsyan 72'; Héber 76'; S.Fofana (yellow card) 84'; Grigoryan 86'	Report	D.Berisha (yellow card) 3'; Sserunkuma (yellow card) 13'; B.Chimakadze (yellow card) 23'	Stadium: Alashkert Stadium; Attendance: 300; Referee: Edgar Sahakyan

29 August 2015 5	Ararat Yerevan	1 – 2	Alashkert	Yerevan
17:30 (UTC+4)	N.Grigoryan (yellow card) 28'; Bulut 35' (yellow card) 36'; Kone (yellow card) 45'	Report	Manasyan 42'; A.Grigoryan (yellow card) 44'; Héber 50' (pen.); Ghazaryan (yellow card) 73'; Dukić (yellow card) 86'	Stadium: Yerevan Football Academy Stadium; Attendance: 500; Referee: Artur Simonyan

12 September 2015 6	Alashkert	2 – 0	Mika	Yerevan
16:00 (UTC+4)	Dukić (yellow card) 39'; Grigoryan (yellow card) 65'; M.Manasyan 69', 79'	Report	Kvekveskiri (yellow card) 71'	Stadium: Alashkert Stadium; Attendance: 500; Referee: Suren Baliyan

19 September 2015 7	Shirak	1 – 2	Alashkert	Gyumri
17:00 (UTC+4)	D.Hakobyan (yellow card) 8'; G.Malakyan (yellow card) 25'; K.Kouakou 34'; A.Muradyan (yellow card) 85'	Report	Grigoryan (yellow card) 25'; Yedigaryan 51'; Héber 54'	Stadium: Gyumri City Stadium; Attendance: 1,000; Referee: Suren Baliyan

27 September 2015 8	Alashkert	1 – 4	Pyunik	Yerevan
15:00 (UTC+4)	M.Manasyan 58'; Muradyan (yellow card) 61'	Report	Gh.Poghosyan 1', 66', 90+2'; V.Pogosyan 40'; Ga.Poghosyan (yellow card) 55'	Stadium: Alashkert Stadium; Attendance: 500; Referee: Zaven Hovhannisyan

3 October 2015 9	Gandzasar Kapan	2 – 2	Alashkert	Kapan
15:00 (UTC+4)	Barseghyan (yellow card) 10'; Dukić 29' (o.g.); Gogatishvili (yellow card) 45'; Ishkhanyan (yellow card) 67'; Memović (yellow card) 75'; Burayev 78'	Report	Muradyan (yellow card) 10'; M.Manasyan 33'; Héber 35'; S.Fofana (red card) 38'; Dukić (yellow card) 45'; Minasyan (red card) 64'	Stadium: Gandzasar Stadium; Attendance: 2,000; Referee: Suren Baliyan

18 October 2015 10	Alashkert	3 – 0	Banants	Yerevan
14:00 (UTC+4)	Héber 19', 76'; Arakelyan (yellow card) 56'; Balabekyan (yellow card) 59'; M.Manasyan 68' (pen.)	Report	K.Harutyunyan (yellow card) 35'; A.Shakhnazaryan (red card) 67'	Stadium: Alashkert Stadium; Attendance: 700; Referee: Zaven Hovhannisyan

25 October 2015 11	Ulisses	0 – 3	Alashkert	Yerevan
13:00 (UTC+4)	N.Davtyan (yellow card) 74'	Report	G. Hovhannisyan (yellow card) 32'; M.Manasyan 57', 61'; Héber 79'	Stadium: Vazgen Sargsyan Republican Stadium; Attendance: 100; Referee: Andranik Gabrielyan

31 October 2015 12	Alashkert	1 – 1	Ararat Yerevan	Yerevan
14:00 (UTC+4)	Yedigaryan (yellow card) 43'; Manasyan 50'; Voskanyan (yellow card) 68'	Report	Nranyan 41' (yellow card) 48'; Kaya (yellow card) 43'	Stadium: Alashkert Stadium; Attendance: 200; Referee: Artur Safaryan

7 November 2015 13	Mika	0 – 1	Alashkert	Yerevan
14:00 (UTC+4)	Inkin (yellow card) 80'; A.Belomyttsev (yellow card) 87'	Report	M.Manasyan 12' (yellow card) 54'	Stadium: Mika Stadium; Attendance: 500; Referee: Artur Simonyan

21 November 2015 14	Alashkert	2 – 0	Shirak	Yerevan
14:00 (UTC+4)	Héber 24'; A.Hovsepyan 31'; Minasyan (yellow card) 77'; Muradyan (yellow card) 90+1'	Report	K.Kouakou (yellow card) 22'; G.Malakyan (yellow card) 43'	Stadium: Alashkert Stadium; Attendance: 300; Referee: Artur Simonyan

28 November 2015 15	Pyunik	0 – 0	Alashkert	Yerevan
16:00 (UTC+4)		Report	V.Minasyan (yellow card) 44'; Ge.Poghosyan (yellow card) 50'; A.Hovsepyan (yellow card) 56'; M.Manasyan (yellow card) 62'	Stadium: Yerevan Football Academy; Attendance: 700; Referee: Suren Baliyan

2 March 2016 16	Alashkert	3 – 0	Gandzasar Kapan	Yerevan
14:00 (UTC+4)	M.Manasyan 22'; Héber 24', 71' (yellow card) 87'; K.Veranyan (yellow card) 52'	Report	Arm.Petrosyan (yellow card) 26'	Stadium: Alashkert Stadium; Attendance: 300; Referee: Suren Baliyan

12 March 2016 17	Banants	2 – 0	Alashkert	Yerevan
14:00 (UTC+4)	Badoyan 70'; Avetisyan 72'; Mecinović (yellow card) 78'	Report	Ge.Poghosyan (yellow card) 24'; Arta.Yedigaryan (yellow card) 56'; Artu.Yedigaryan (yellow card) 69'	Stadium: Banants Stadium; Attendance: 400; Referee: Artur Simonyan

19 March 2016 18	Alashkert	3 – 0	Ulisses	Yerevan
14:00 (UTC+4)		Report		Stadium: Alashkert Stadium
Note: Match awarded 3-0 by FA decision.

6 April 2016 19	Ararat Yerevan	0 – 0	Alashkert	Yerevan
14:00 (UTC+4)	de la Fuente (yellow card) 45'; G.Khachatryan (yellow card) 47'	Report	Voskanyan (yellow card) 67'; Gyozalyan (yellow card) 90+3'	Stadium: Hrazdan Stadium; Attendance: 250; Referee: Zaven Hovhannisyan

2 April 2016 20	Alashkert	2 – 1	Mika	Yerevan
16:00 (UTC+4)	Grigoryan 4'; Héber 12'; V.Minasyan (yellow card) 18'; Artu.Yedigaryan (yellow card) 44'; Arta.Yedigaryan (yellow card) 68'	Report	A.Kpenia 49' (yellow card) 74'; Kiselyov (yellow card) 58'; V.Movsisyan (yellow card) 59'; Chicherin (yellow card) 79'	Stadium: Alashkert Stadium; Attendance: 500; Referee: Artur Safaryan

9 April 2016 21	Shirak	2 – 1	Alashkert	Gyumri
16:00 (UTC+4)	Diarrassouba 73', 81'; K.Kouakou (yellow card) 83'; A.Hovhannisyan (yellow card) 90+1'	Report	M.Manasyan 90+2'	Stadium: Gyumri City Stadium; Attendance: 500; Referee: Artur Simonyan

16 April 2016 22	Alashkert	3 – 0	Pyunik	Yerevan
16:00 (UTC+4)	M.Manasyan 54'; Muradyan (yellow card) 65'; Arakelyan 72'; Arta.Yedigaryan 77'; Voskanyan (yellow card) 90+2'	Report		Stadium: Alashkert Stadium; Attendance: 800; Referee: Suren Baliyan

23 April 2016 23	Gandzasar Kapan	2 – 2	Alashkert	Kapan
17:00 (UTC+4)	Ishkhanyan 26' (yellow card) 45'; Barseghyan 55' (yellow card) 56'	Report	Kasparov (yellow card) 59'; Héber 90+3'; R.Ghazaryan 90+4'	Stadium: Gandzasar Stadium; Attendance: 2,000; Referee: Artur Simonyan

30 April 2016 24	Alashkert	2 – 1	Banants	Yerevan
17:00 (UTC+4)	Héber 16'; Grigoryan (yellow card) 38'; Muradyan 78'	Report	V.Ayvazyan 57'; N.Petrosyan (yellow card) 66'; Burayev (yellow card) 68'	Stadium: Alashkert Stadium; Attendance: 400; Referee: Gevorg Eghoyan

8 May 2016 25	Ulisses	0 – 3	Alashkert	Yerevan
19:00 (UTC+4)		Report		Stadium: Vazgen Sargsyan Republican Stadium
Note: Match awarded 3-0 by FA decision.

14 May 2016 26	Alashkert	0 – 1	Ararat Yerevan	Yerevan
17:00 (UTC+4)	G.Poghosyan (yellow card) 60'; Gyozalyan (yellow card) 62'; A.Hovsepyan (yellow card) 79'	Report	Kone 81' de la Fuente (yellow card) 85'; A.Meliksetyan (yellow card) 90+2'	Stadium: Alashkert Stadium; Attendance: 600; Referee: Gevorg Eghoyan

22 May 2016 27	Mika	0 – 2	Alashkert	Yerevan
17:00 (UTC+4)	Shumilin (yellow card) 9'; Beglaryan (red card) 68'; Kovačević (yellow card) 71'	Report	A.Grigoryan (yellow card) 17'; M.Manasyan 22'; Arta.Yedigaryan (yellow card) 38'; A.Avagyan (yellow card) 54'; Héber 70' (pen.); K.Veranyan (yellow card) 90+4'	Stadium: Mika Stadium; Attendance: 1,500; Referee: Suren Baliyan

18 May 2016 28	Alashkert	2 – 3	Shirak	Yerevan
17:00 (UTC+4)	A.Grigoryan (yellow card) 34'; A.Avagyan 55' (yellow card) 90+4'; R.Ghazaryan (yellow card) 73'; Minasyan 85' (yellow card) 89'	Report	Diarrassouba 13'; Arreola (yellow card) 38'; M.Kaba (yellow card) 48'; Minasyan 72' (o.g.); Hovsepyan (yellow card) 75'; A.Davoyan (yellow card) 77'; V.Ayvazyan 90+4'	Stadium: Alashkert Stadium; Attendance: 1,000; Referee: Zaven Hovhannisyan

==== Table ====
Pos	Team	Pld	W	D	L	GF	GA	GD	Pts	Qualification or relegation
1	Alashkert (C)	28	16	7	5	50	24	+26	55	Qualification for the Champions League first qualifying round
2	Shirak	28	15	7	6	41	27	+14	52	Qualification for the Europa League first qualifying round
3	Pyunik	28	13	9	6	44	21	+23	48	Qualification for the Europa League first qualifying round
4	Gandzasar Kapan	28	11	12	5	35	27	+8	45	
5	Ararat Yerevan	28	9	10	9	28	31	−3	37	

Source: Football Federation of Armenia, Soccerway
Rules for classification: 1) Points; 2) Play-off (only if deciding champion); 3) Matches won; 4) Head-to-head points; 5) Head-to-head matches won; 6) Head-to-head goal difference; 7) Head-to-head goals scored; 8) Head-to-head away goals scored; 9) Goal difference; 10) Goals scored.
(C) Champions

=== Armenian Cup ===
28 October 2015 Quarterfinal 1st leg	Alashkert	1 – 0	Ararat Yerevan	Yerevan
15:00 (UTC+4)	M.Manasyan 17'; Arta.Yedigaryan (yellow card) 72'	Report	N.Grigoryan (yellow card) 32'; Z.Bulut (yellow card) 90+1'	Stadium: Alashkert Stadium; Attendance: 300; Referee: Artur Simonyan

25 November 2015 Quarterfinal 2nd leg	Ararat Yerevan	0 – 4 (0 – 5 agg.)	Alashkert	Yerevan
14:30 (UTC+4)	N.Grigoryan (yellow card) 32'; M.Orozco (yellow card) 30'; D.Hovsepyan (yellow card) 37'	Report	Minasyan (yellow card) 29'; Voskanyan (yellow card) 38'; Héber 41', 58'; M.Manasyan 49'; Balabekyan 84'	Stadium: Vazgen Sargsyan Republican Stadium; Attendance: 300; Referee: Zaven Hovhannisyan

15 March 2016 Semifinal 1st leg	Banants	0 – 1	Alashkert	Yerevan
14:00 (UTC+4)	Drobarov (yellow card) 30'; Torrejón (red card) 77'	Report	Voskanyan (yellow card) 30'; M.Manasyan (yellow card) 31'; Héber 45'; Arakelyan (yellow card) 57'; K.Veranyan (red card) 77'; Ga.Poghosyan (red card) 85'	Stadium: Banants Stadium; Attendance: 600; Referee: Suren Baliyan

12 April 2016 Semifinal 2nd leg	Alashkert	1 – 1 (2 – 2 agg.)	Banants	Yerevan
15:00 (UTC+4)	Arta.Yedigaryan (yellow card) 54'; Héber (yellow card) 78'; Artu.Yedigaryan (yellow card) 80'; Voskanyan 90+5'	Report	Badoyan 14'; H. Hakobyan (yellow card) 31'; Mecinović (yellow card) 65'; Laércio 75' (yellow card) 79'; Kachmazov (yellow card) 80'; López (yellow card) 90+6'	Stadium: Alashkert Stadium; Attendance: 500; Referee: Zaven Hovhannisyan

=== UEFA Europa League ===
==== Qualifying rounds ====
2 July 2015 First Qualifying Round 1st leg	Alashkert (Armenia)	1 – 0	(Scotland) St Johnstone	Yerevan, Armenia
19:00 (UTC+4)	M.Manasyan 59'; V.Minasyan (yellow card) 80'	Report	McKay (yellow card) 43'	Stadium: Vazgen Sargsyan Republican Stadium; Attendance: 2,600; Referee: Jakob Kehlet (Denmark)
Note: Alashkert played their home matches at Vazgen Sargsyan Republican Stadium, Yerevan, instead of their regular stadium Alashkert Stadium, Yerevan.

9 July 2015 First Qualifying Round 2nd leg	St Johnstone (Scotland)	2 – 1 (2 – 2 agg.)	(Armenia) Alashkert	Perth, Scotland
22:45 (UTC+4)	Scobbie (yellow card) 13'; O'Halloran 34'; Wright (yellow card) 37'; Anderson (yellow card) 69'; McKay 87'	Report	Muradyan (yellow card) 11' (yellow-red card) 65'; Grigoryan (yellow card) 18'; V.Minasyan (yellow card) 29'; Usenya (yellow card) 70'; Gyozalyan 74'; M.Manasyan (yellow card) 82'	Stadium: McDiarmid Park; Attendance: 5,764; Referee: Fredy Fautrel (France)

16 July 2015 Second qualifying round 1st leg	Kairat (Kazakhstan)	3 – 0	(Armenia) Alashkert	Almaty, Kazakhstan
17:45 (UTC+4)	Islamkhan 14' (pen.); Soares (yellow card) 28'; Gohou 55'; Despotović 69'; Riera (yellow card) 90+1'	Report	Grigoryan (yellow card) 50'	Stadium: Central Stadium; Attendance: 22,100; Referee: Sergey Ivanov (Russia)

23 July 2015 Second qualifying round 2nd leg	Alashkert (Armenia)	2 – 1 (2 – 4 agg.)	(Kazakhstan) Kairat	Yerevan, Armenia
19:00 (UTC+4)	Arakelyan 28'; Grigoryan (yellow card) 70'; M.Manasyan (yellow card) 77'; V.Minasyan (yellow card) 84'; Héber 90+4'	Report	Gohou 45+3'	Stadium: Vazgen Sargsyan Republican Stadium; Attendance: 2,500; Referee: João Capela (Portugal)
Note: Alashkert played their home matches at Vazgen Sargsyan Republican Stadium, Yerevan, instead of their regular stadium Alashkert Stadium, Yerevan.

== Statistics ==
As of match played 18 May 2016

=== Appearances and goals ===
No.	Pos	Nat	Player	Total		Premier League		Armenian Cup		Europa League	
No.	Pos	Nat	Player	Apps	Goals	Apps	Goals	Apps	Goals	Apps	Goals
1	GK	(Armenia) ARM	Gevorg Kasparov	34	0	26	0	4	0	4	0
2	DF	(Mali) MLI	Sékou Fofana	18	0	14	0	0	0	4	0
3	FW	(Brazil) BRA	Héber	34	20	25+1	16	4	3	1+3	1
4	DF	(Armenia) ARM	Andranik Voskanyan	24	1	17+2	0	4	1	0+1	0
5	MF	(Armenia) ARM	Karen Muradyan	26	1	17+2	1	4	0	3	0
6	DF	(Armenia) ARM	Ararat Arakelyan	33	2	25	1	4	0	4	1
7	FW	(Armenia) ARM	Mihran Manasyan	30	19	20+2	16	3+1	2	1+3	1
8	MF	(Armenia) ARM	Gagik Poghosyan	3	0	0+1	0	1+1	0	0	0
10	MF	(Armenia) ARM	Khoren Veranyan	33	0	24+1	0	4	0	4	0
11	FW	(Armenia) ARM	Arsen Balabekyan	14	1	1+11	0	0+2	1	0	0
12	MF	(Armenia) ARM	Artur Avagyan	9	1	7+1	1	1	0	0	0
13	DF	(Armenia) ARM	Gevorg Poghosyan	25	0	14+3	0	3+1	0	3+1	0
14	MF	(Armenia) ARM	Aram Bareghamyan	18	0	5+7	0	1+1	0	4	0
15	MF	(Armenia) ARM	Aram Hovsepyan	20	1	10+5	1	2+1	0	0+2	0
17	DF	(Armenia) ARM	Artak Yedigaryan	25	2	20+2	2	3	0	0	0
18	MF	(Armenia) ARM	Aram Loretsyan	11	0	1+9	0	0+1	0	0	0
19	DF	(Armenia) ARM	Vahagn Minasyan	25	0	18	0	3	0	4	0
20	MF	(Armenia) ARM	Artur Yedigaryan	12	0	5+6	0	1	0	0	0
21	MF	(Armenia) ARM	Artak Grigoryan	26	2	19+1	2	1+1	0	4	0
22	FW	(Armenia) ARM	Norayr Gyozalyan	24	1	5+13	0	0+2	0	4	1
	MF	(Armenia) ARM	Liparit Dashtoyan	1	0	0+1	0	0	0	0	0
	MF	(Armenia) ARM	Rafael Ghazaryan	7	1	0+6	1	0	0	0+1	0
	FW	(Armenia) ARM	Areg Azatyan	1	0	0+1	0	0	0	0	0
Players who left Alashkert during the season:
9	FW	(Armenia) ARM	Gevorg Karapetyan	1	0	0	0	0	0	0+1	0
17	DF	(Belarus) BLR	Sergey Usenya	8	0	3+1	0	0	0	4	0
20	DF	(Serbia) SRB	Duško Dukić	9	1	8+1	1	0	0	0	0
	DF	(Armenia) ARM	Grigor Hovhannisyan	8	0	3+1	0	0	0	4	0

=== Goal scorers ===
Place	Position	Nation	Number	Name	Premier League	Armenian Cup	Europa League	Total
1	FW	(Brazil)	9	Héber	16	3	1	20
2	FW	(Armenia)	7	Mihran Manasyan	16	2	1	19
3	DF	(Armenia)	17	Artak Yedigaryan	2	0	0	2
3	MF	(Armenia)	21	Artak Grigoryan	2	0	0	2
3	DF	(Armenia)	6	Ararat Arakelyan	1	0	1	2
6	DF	(Armenia)	19	Vahagn Minasyan	1	0	0	1
6	DF	(Serbia)	20	Duško Dukić	1	0	0	1
6	MF	(Armenia)	12	Artur Avagyan	1	0	0	1
6	MF	(Armenia)		Rafael Ghazaryan	1	0	0	1
6	MF	(Armenia)	18	Aram Loretsyan	1	0	0	1
6	MF	(Armenia)	5	Karen Muradyan	1	0	0	1
6	MF	(Armenia)	15	Aram Hovsepyan	1	0	0	1
6	FW	(Armenia)	11	Arsen Balabekyan	0	1	0	1
6	DF	(Armenia)	4	Andranik Voskanyan	0	1	0	1
6	FW	(Armenia)	22	Norayr Gyozalyan	0	0	1	1
Awarded Goals					6	0	0	6
				TOTALS	50	7	4	61

=== Clean sheets ===
Place	Position	Nation	Number	Name	Premier League	Armenian Cup	Europa League	Total
1	GK	(Armenia)	1	Gevorg Kasparov	12	3	1	16
				TOTALS	12	3	1	16

=== Disciplinary record ===
Number	Nation	Position	Name	Premier League		Armenian Cup		Europa League		Total	
Number	Nation	Position	Name	Yellow card	Red card	Yellow card	Red card	Yellow card	Red card	Yellow card	Red card
1	(Armenia)	GK	Gevorg Kasparov	1	0	0	0	0	0	1	0
2	(Mali)	DF	Sékou Fofana	2	1	0	0	0	0	2	1
4	(Armenia)	DF	Andranik Voskanyan	3	0	2	0	0	0	5	0
5	(Armenia)	MF	Karen Muradyan	4	0	2	1	0	0	6	1
6	(Armenia)	DF	Ararat Arakelyan	2	0	1	0	0	0	3	0
7	(Armenia)	FW	Mihran Manasyan	3	0	1	0	2	0	6	0
8	(Armenia)	MF	Gagik Poghosyan	0	0	0	1	0	0	0	1
9	(Brazil)	FW	Héber	2	0	1	0	0	0	3	0
10	(Armenia)	MF	Khoren Veranyan	4	0	0	1	0	0	4	1
11	(Armenia)	FW	Arsen Balabekyan	1	0	0	0	0	0	1	0
12	(Armenia)	MF	Artur Avagyan	2	0	0	0	0	0	2	0
13	(Armenia)	DF	Gevorg Poghosyan	3	0	0	0	0	0	3	0
15	(Armenia)	MF	Aram Hovsepyan	2	0	0	0	0	0	2	0
17	(Armenia)	DF	Artak Yedigaryan	4	0	2	0	0	0	6	0
19	(Armenia)	DF	Vahagn Minasyan	5	1	1	0	3	0	9	1
20	(Armenia)	MF	Artur Yedigaryan	2	0	1	0	0	0	3	0
21	(Armenia)	MF	Artak Grigoryan	6	0	0	0	3	0	9	0
22	(Armenia)	FW	Norayr Gyozalyan	2	0	0	0	0	0	2	0
	(Armenia)	MF	Rafael Ghazaryan	2	0	0	0	0	0	2	0
Players who left Alashkert during the season:
17	(Belarus)	DF	Sergey Usenya	0	0	0	0	1	0	1	0
20	(Serbia)	DF	Duško Dukić	3	0	0	0	0	0	3	0
	(Armenia)	DF	Grigor Hovhannisyan	1	0	0	0	0	0	1	0
			TOTALS	54	2	9	2	11	1	74	5
