= 2016–17 FC Ararat Yerevan season =

Ararat Yerevan
2016–17 season
- Chairman: Hrach Kaprielian
- Manager: Arkady Andreasyan
- Stadium: Republican Stadium (1st half of season); Mika Stadium (2nd half of season)
- Premier League: 6th
- Armenian Cup: Quarterfinal vs Banants
- Top goalscorer: League: Gegham Tumbaryan (3); All: Gegham Tumbaryan (4)
- Highest home attendance: 3,000 vs Alashkert (31 May 2017)
- Lowest home attendance: 100 vs Banants (21 September 2016) vs Banants (27 November 2016) vs Gandzasar Kapan (3 December 2016)
- Average home league attendance: 438 (31 May 2017)
| Home colours | Away colours | Third colours |

The 2016–17 season is a FC Ararat Yerevan's 26th consecutive season in Armenian Premier League. This article shows player statistics and all official matches that the club will play during the 2016–17 season.

== Season events ==
On 5 July 2016, Ararat announced that they would host Persian Gulf Pro League club Esteghlal on 7 July.

On 15 July, Raffi Kaya left Ararat to sign for Swiss club Stade Nyonnais, whilst also announcing the signing of Nassim Aaron Kpehia and Brahima Bruno Koné from Mika.

On 1 August, Ararat announced the signings of Aram Ayrapetyan, Argishti Petrosyan, Hakob and Aram Loretsyan, Karen Avoyan, Happy Simelela and Kouadio Brou. Two days later, Ararat also signed Marat Daudov, Gevorg Poghosyan and Rafael Ghazaryan.

On 6 August 2016, Arkady Andreasyan was appointed as the club's manager in early August 2016.

On 14 October, Ararat announced that they had terminated their contracts with Happy Simelela, Kouadio Brou, Pol Asu Oshi and Brahima Bruno Koné by mutual consent. Two weeks later, Ararat also announced they had terminated their contracts with Souleymane Kone, Oumarou Kaina and Kyrian Nwabueze, also by mutual consent.

On 20 December, Ararat announced wholesale changes to their squad, with Erik Nazaryan, Gor Poghosyan, Revik Yeghiazaryan, David Minasyan, Andranik Kocharyan and Edgar Mkrtchyan all signing for the club, whilst Petros Ter-Petrosyan, Aram Loretsyan, Davit Markosyan and Nassim Aaron Kpehia all left the club.

In February 2017, Ararat moved their home games from the Republican Stadium to Mika Stadium due to renovation work that was needed to be carried out at the Republican Stadium.

== Squad ==
As of match played 31 May 2017

| Number | Name | Nationality | Position | Date of birth (age) | Signed from | Signed in | Contract ends | Apps. | Goals |
Goalkeepers
| 1 | Gevorg Prazyan | (Armenia) | GK | 24 July 1989 (aged 27) | Gandzasar Kapan | 2015 | | | |
| 12 | Arman Meliksetyan | (Armenia) | GK | 21 July 1995 (aged 21) | Banants | 2013 | | 10 | 0 |
| 22 | Gor Elyazyan | (Armenia) | GK | 1 June 1991 (aged 25) | Kotayk | 2017 | | 4 | 0 |
| 88 | Poghos Ayvazyan | (Armenia) | GK | 9 June 1995 (aged 21) | Mika | 2016 | | 9 | 0 |
Defenders
| 2 | Revik Yeghiazaryan | (Armenia) | DF | 1 June 1991 (aged 25) | Kotayk | 2017 | | 12 | 1 |
| 3 | Gevorg Poghosyan | (Armenia) | DF | 26 August 1986 (aged 30) | Alashkert | 2016 | | 27 | 0 |
| 5 | Vardan Arzoyan | (Armenia) | DF | 30 April 1995 (aged 22) | Pyunik | 2016 | | 20 | 1 |
| 6 | Argishti Petrosyan | (Armenia) | DF | 16 October 1992 (aged 24) | Homenetmen Beirut | 2016 | | 26 | 0 |
| 8 | Yuri Gareginyan | (Armenia) | DF | 3 February 1994 (aged 23) | | 2015 | | 26 | 0 |
| 14 | Hakob Loretsyan | (Armenia) | DF | 16 March 1994 (aged 23) | Alashkert | 2016 | | | |
| 15 | Sergey Mkrtchyan | (Armenia) | DF | 20 May 1995 (aged 22) | Ulisses | 2016 | | 13 | 1 |
| 20 | Rafael Safaryan | (Armenia) | DF | 30 January 1986 (aged 31) | | 2016 | | | |
| 23 | Gor Poghosyan | (Armenia) | DF | 11 June 1988 (aged 28) | Kotayk | 2017 | | 13 | 0 |
| | Armen Durunts | (Armenia) | DF | 1 November 1990 (aged 26) | Kotayk | 2017 | | | |
| | Erik Nazaryan | (Armenia) | DF | 14 March 1996 (aged 21) | Kotayk | 2017 | | 0 | 0 |
| | Artur Stepanyan | (Armenia) | DF | 17 November 1999 (aged 17) | Youth team | 2017 | | 10 | 0 |
Midfielders
| 4 | Karen Avoyan | (Armenia) | MF | 22 August 1986 (aged 30) | Lernayin Artsakh Goris | 2016 | | 10 | 0 |
| 7 | Davit Minasyan | (Armenia) | MF | 9 March 1993 (aged 24) | Kotayk | 2017 | | 11 | 1 |
| 9 | Andranik Kocharyan | (Armenia) | MF | 29 January 1994 (aged 23) | Kotayk | 2017 | | 8 | 1 |
| 10 | Edgar Mkrtchyan | (Armenia) | MF | 14 July 1994 (aged 22) | Kotayk | 2017 | | 9 | 1 |
| 11 | David G. Grigoryan | (Armenia) | MF | 17 July 1989 (aged 27) | Mika | 2017 | | | |
| 21 | Ruslan Avagyan | (Armenia) | MF | 24 June 1995 (aged 21) | Youth team | 2016 | | 15 | 0 |
| 90 | Areg Azatyan | (Armenia) | MF | 29 June 1990 (aged 26) | Banants | 2015 | | 21 | 1 |
| | Mikael Arustamyan | (Armenia) | MF | 18 January 1996 (aged 21) | Youth team | 2017 | | 2 | 1 |
| | Aram Hovsepyan | (Armenia) | MF | 6 June 1991 (aged 25) | Alashkert | 2017 | | 1 | 0 |
| | Garegin Kirakosyan | (Armenia) | MF | 26 November 1995 (aged 21) | Kotayk | 2017 | | 8 | 0 |
| | Narek Papoyan | (Armenia) | MF | 9 April 1996 (aged 21) | Ulisses | 2017 | | 1 | 0 |
| | Norik Avdalyan | (Russia) | MF | 1 January 1996 (aged 21) | Youth team | 2017 | | 1 | 0 |
Forwards
| 17 | Gegham Tumbaryan | (Armenia) | FW | 13 May 1996 (aged 21) | Pyunik | 2016 | | 30 | 4 |
| 19 | Sargis Metoyan | (Armenia) | FW | 6 September 1997 (aged 19) | Dvin Artashat | 2016 | | 16 | 1 |
| | Mikael Arustamyan | (Armenia) | FW | 18 January 1996 (aged 21) | Banants | 2016 | | 0 | 0 |
| | David Ghandilyan | (Armenia) | FW | 4 June 1993 (aged 23) | Shirak | 2014 | | 13 | 0 |
| | Hovhannes Hovhannisyan | (Armenia) | FW | 5 October 1993 (aged 23) | Gandzasar Kapan | 2017 | | 0 | 0 |
| | Hovhannes Papazyan | (Armenia) | FW | 14 July 1996 (aged 20) | Kotayk | 2017 | | 8 | 0 |
Away on loan
Left during the season
| 2 | Vahe Matirosyan | (Armenia) | DF | 19 January 1988 (aged 29) | Ulisses | 2009 | | | |
| 3 | Sergei Avagimyan | (Russia) | DF | 5 July 1989 (aged 27) | Baikal Irkutsk | 2016 | | 14 | 0 |
| 4 | Souleymane Kone | (Ivory Coast) | DF | 1 May 1996 (aged 21) | CSKA Sofia | 2015 | | 42 | 1 |
| 5 | Norayr Grigoryan | (Armenia) | DF | 7 January 1983 (aged 34) | Banants | 2015 | | | |
| 7 | Aram Loretsyan | (Armenia) | MF | 7 March 1993 (aged 24) | Alashkert | 2016 | | | |
| 8 | Happy Simelela | (South Africa) | MF | 17 October 1994 (aged 22) | | 2016 | | 4 | 0 |
| 9 | Gevorg Nranyan | (Armenia) | FW | 9 March 1986 (aged 31) | Banants | 2015 | | | |
| 9 | Mher Sahakyan | (Armenia) | FW | 15 July 1995 (aged 21) | Impuls | 2013 | | 54 | 3 |
| 10 | Oumarou Kaina | (Cameroon) | FW | 16 October 1996 (aged 20) | Aspire Academy | 2015 | | 43 | 2 |
| 10 | Marat Daudov | (Ukraine) | MF | 3 August 1989 (aged 27) | Alashkert | 2017 | | 10 | 0 |
| 11 | Rafael Ghazaryan | (Armenia) | MF | 17 May 1990 (aged 27) | Alashkert | 2016 | | 11 | 0 |
| 14 | Kouadio Brou | (Ivory Coast) | MF | 25 December 1995 (aged 21) | Shirak | 2016 | | 7 | 0 |
| 15 | Petros Ter-Petrosyan | (Armenia) | MF | 13 December 1998 (aged 18) | Mika | 2016 | | 11 | 0 |
| 18 | Gorik Khachatryan | (Armenia) | DF | 16 June 1988 (aged 28) | Impuls | 2011 | | | |
| 19 | Nassim Aaron Kpehia | (Ivory Coast) | MF | 20 December 1996 (aged 20) | Mika | 2016 | | 11 | 2 |
| 20 | Pol Asu Oshi | (Nigeria) | MF | 27 September 1996 (aged 20) | | 2016 | | 4 | 0 |
| 23 | Kyrian Nwabueze | (Nigeria) | FW | 11 December 1992 (aged 24) | Tulsa Roughnecks | 2016 | | 18 | 3 |
| 77 | Aram Ayrapetyan | (Armenia) | GK | 22 November 1986 (aged 30) | Banants | 2015 | | 29 | 0 |
| | Davit Markosyan | (Armenia) | DF | 7 October 1995 (aged 21) | Pyunik | 2017 | | 4 | 0 |
| | Armen Derdzyan | (Armenia) | MF | 17 November 1993 (aged 23) | Youth team | 2017 | | 10 | 0 |

== Transfers ==
=== In ===
| Date | Position | Nationality | Name | From | Fee | Ref. |
|---|---|---|---|---|---|---|
| 1 July 2016 | GK | (Armenia) | Poghos Ayvazyan | Mika | Undisclosed | |
| 15 July 2016 | MF | (Ivory Coast) | Nassim Aaron Kpehia | Mika | Undisclosed | |
| 15 July 2016 | FW | (Ivory Coast) | Brahima Bruno Koné | Mika | Undisclosed | |
| 1 August 2016 | GK | (Armenia) | Aram Ayrapetyan | Unattached | Free | |
| 1 August 2016 | DF | (Armenia) | Hakob Loretsyan | Alashkert | Undisclosed | |
| 1 August 2016 | DF | (Armenia) | Argishti Petrosyan | Homenetmen Beirut | Undisclosed | |
| 1 August 2016 | MF | (Armenia) | Karen Avoyan | Lernayin Artsakh | Undisclosed | |
| 1 August 2016 | MF | (Armenia) | Aram Loretsyan | Alashkert | Undisclosed | |
| 1 August 2016 | MF | (Ivory Coast) | Kouadio Brou | Shirak | Undisclosed | |
| 1 August 2016 | MF | (South Africa) | Happy Simelela | Unattached | Free | |
| 3 August 2016 | DF | (Armenia) | Gevorg Poghosyan | Alashkert | Undisclosed | |
| 3 August 2016 | MF | (Ukraine) | Marat Daudov | Alashkert | Undisclosed | |
| 3 August 2016 | MF | (Armenia) | Rafael Ghazaryan | Alashkert | Undisclosed | |
| 3 August 2016 | DF | (Armenia) | Rafael Safaryan | Unattached | Free | |
| 20 December 2016 | DF | (Armenia) | Erik Nazaryan | Kotayk | Unattached | |
| 20 December 2016 | DF | (Armenia) | Gor Poghosyan | Kotayk | Unattached | |
| 20 December 2016 | DF | (Armenia) | Revik Yeghiazaryan | Kotayk | Unattached | |
| 20 December 2016 | MF | (Armenia) | Davit Minasyan | Kotayk | Unattached | |
| 20 December 2016 | MF | (Armenia) | Andranik Kocharyan | Kotayk | Unattached | |
| 20 December 2016 | MF | (Armenia) | Edgar Mkrtchyan | Kotayk | Unattached | |
| 17 January 2017 | GK | (Armenia) | Gor Elyazyan | Kotayk | Undisclosed | |
| 17 January 2017 | DF | (Armenia) | David G. Grigoryan | Mika | Undisclosed | |
| 17 January 2017 | MF | (Armenia) | Areg Azatyan | Alashkert | Undisclosed | |
| 17 January 2017 | MF | (Armenia) | Aram Hovsepyan | Alashkert | Undisclosed | |
| 17 January 2017 | FW | (Armenia) | Hovhannes Hovhannisyan | Gandzasar Kapan | Undisclosed | |
| 27 February 2017 | DF | (Armenia) | Armen Durunts | Kotayk | Undisclosed | |

=== Out ===
| Start date | Position | Nationality | Name | To | Fee | Ref. |
|---|---|---|---|---|---|---|
| 15 July 2016 | DF | (France) | Raffi Kaya | Stade Nyonnais | Undisclosed | |
| 21 December 2016 | MF | (Armenia) | Mher Sahakyan | Alashkert | Undisclosed | |
| 21 December 2016 | FW | (Armenia) | Gevorg Nranyan | Alashkert | Undisclosed | |

=== Loans out ===
| Start date | Position | Nationality | Name | To | End date | Ref. |
|---|---|---|---|---|---|---|
| 1 July 2016 | FW | (Armenia) | David Ghandilyan | Homenetmen Beirut | 17 February 2017 | |

=== Released ===
| Date | Position | Nationality | Name | Joined | Date | Ref. |
|---|---|---|---|---|---|---|
| 14 October 2016 | MF | (South Africa) | Happy Simelela | | | |
| 14 October 2016 | MF | (Ivory Coast) | Kouadio Brou | | | |
| 14 October 2016 | MF | (Nigeria) | Pol Asu Oshi | | | |
| 14 October 2016 | MF | (Ivory Coast) | Brahima Bruno Koné | Saint George | 26 February 2017 | |
| 28 October 2016 | DF | (Ivory Coast) | Souleymane Kone | Djurgården | 23 December 2016 | |
| 28 October 2016 | FW | (Cameroon) | Oumarou Kaina | Shirak | 26 February 2017 | |
| 28 October 2016 | FW | (Nigeria) | Kyrian Nwabueze | Shirak | 28 February 2017 | |
| 20 December 2016 | DF | (Armenia) | Petros Ter-Petrosyan | | | |
| 20 December 2016 | MF | (Armenia) | Aram Loretsyan | | | |
| 20 December 2016 | MF | (Armenia) | Davit Markosyan | | | |
| 20 December 2016 | MF | (Ivory Coast) | Nassim Aaron Kpehia | | | |
| 31 December 2016 | GK | (Armenia) | Aram Ayrapetyan | Banants | 13 February 2017 | |
| 31 December 2016 | DF | (Armenia) | Sergei Avagimyan | Ararat-2 Moscow | | |
| 31 December 2016 | MF | (Armenia) | Rafael Ghazaryan | Gandzasar Kapan | 30 January 2017 | |
| 16 March 2017 | MF | (Ukraine) | Marat Daudov | Avanhard Kramatorsk | 16 March 2017 | |
| 30 June 2017 | GK | (Armenia) | Areg Azatyan | Gandzasar Kapan | 3 August 2017 | |
| 30 June 2017 | GK | (Armenia) | Armen Durunts | Artsakh | 1 July 2017 | |
| 30 June 2017 | GK | (Armenia) | Gor Elyazyan | Lori | | |
| 30 June 2017 | GK | (Armenia) | Gevorg Prazyan | Retired | | |
| 30 June 2017 | DF | (Armenia) | Hakob Loretsyan | Alashkert | 1 July 2017 | |
| 30 June 2017 | MF | (Armenia) | Edgar Mkrtchyan | Lori | 14 August 2017 | |
| 30 June 2017 | FW | (Armenia) | Norik Avdalyan | Banants | 9 August 2017 | |
| 30 June 2017 | FW | (Armenia) | David Ghandilyan | Deren | 1 August 2017 | |
| 30 June 2017 | FW | (Armenia) | Hovhannes Papazyan | | | |

== Friendlies ==
| 24 January 2017 | Ararat Yerevan | 4 – 0 | Alashkert | Dzoraghbyur |
| (UTC+4) | K.Avoyan; S.Metoyan; G.Kirakosyan | Report | | Stadium: Dzoraghbyur Training Centre |

| 27 January 2017 | Ararat Yerevan | 1 – 2 | Pyunik | Yerevan |
| (UTC+4) | G.Tumbaryan | Report | Goal | Stadium: FAA Stadium |

| 24 February 2017 | Ararat Yerevan (Armenia) | 0 – 1 | (Russia) Armavir | Yerevan |
| (UTC+4) | | Report | G.Poghosyan (o.g.) | Stadium: FAA Stadium |

== Competitions ==
=== Premier League ===
==== Results summary ====
| Overall | | | | | | | | Home | | | | | | Away | | | | | |
| Pld | W | D | L | GF | GA | GD | Pts | W | D | L | GF | GA | GD | W | D | L | GF | GA | GD |
|---|---|---|---|---|---|---|---|---|---|---|---|---|---|---|---|---|---|---|---|
| 30 | 3 | 3 | 24 | 17 | 53 | −36 | 12 | 2 | 2 | 11 | 9 | 24 | −15 | 1 | 1 | 13 | 8 | 29 | −21 |

==== Results by round ====
| Round | 1 | 2 | 3 | 4 | 5 | 6 | 7 | 8 | 9 | 10 | 11 | 12 | 13 | 14 | 15 | 16 | 17 | 18 | 19 | 20 | 21 | 22 | 23 | 24 | 25 | 26 | 27 | 28 | 29 | 30 |
|---|---|---|---|---|---|---|---|---|---|---|---|---|---|---|---|---|---|---|---|---|---|---|---|---|---|---|---|---|---|---|
| Ground | A | A | A | H | A | H | H | H | A | H | A | A | A | H | A | H | H | H | A | H | A | A | A | H | A | H | H | H | A | H |
| Result | L | L | L | D | W | L | L | L | L | L | D | L | L | L | L | D | L | L | L | L | L | L | L | W | L | W | L | L | L | L |
| Position | 5 | 6 | 6 | 6 | 6 | 6 | 6 | 6 | 6 | 6 | 6 | 6 | 6 | 6 | 6 | 6 | 6 | 6 | 6 | 6 | 6 | 6 | 6 | 6 | 6 | 6 | 6 | 6 | 6 | 6 |

Updated to match(es) played on 31 May 2017. Source: See Results
A = Away; H = Home; W = Win; D = Draw; L = Loss

==== Results ====
| 6 August 2016 1 | Banants | 1 – 0 | Ararat Yerevan | Yerevan |
| 18:00 (UTC+4) | A.Bareghamyan (yellow card) 23'; Laércio 57' | Report | Avagimyan (yellow card) 25'; G.Khachatryan (yellow card) 28'; Nwabueze (yellow card) 80' | Stadium: Banants Stadium; Attendance: 700; Referee: Gevorg Eghoyan |

| 13 August 2016 2 | Gandzasar Kapan | 2 – 0 | Ararat Yerevan | Kapan |
| 17:30 (UTC+4) | Claudir 31'; G.Harutyunyan 42'; A.Khachatryan (yellow card) 44' | Report | A.Petrosyan (yellow card) 73' | Stadium: Gandzasar Stadium; Attendance: 1,000; Referee: Artur Safaryan |

| 20 August 2016 3 | Shirak | 1 – 0 | Ararat Yerevan | Gyumri |
| 17:00 (UTC+4) | V.Bichakhchyan 86'; A.Muradyan (yellow card) 89' | Report | H.Simelela (yellow card) 88' | Stadium: Gyumri City Stadium; Attendance: 700; Referee: Gevorg Eghoyan |

| 27 August 2016 4 | Ararat Yerevan | 0 – 0 | Pyunik | Yerevan |
| 19:00 (UTC+4) | K.Brou (yellow card) 24' | Report | A.Kartashyan (yellow card) 27'; V.Hayrapetyan (yellow card) 65' | Stadium: Republican Stadium; Attendance: 250; Referee: Artur Safaryan |

| 10 September 2016 5 | Alashkert | 1 – 3 | Ararat Yerevan | Yerevan |
| 16:00 (UTC+4) | Artu.Yedigaryan 46' (yellow card) 79' | Report | Nwabueze 6', 55' (yellow card) 57'; O.Kaina (yellow card) 17'; N.Kpehia (yellow card) 52' (goal) 76'; P.Ter-Petrosyan (yellow card) 90+3' | Stadium: Alashkert Stadium; Attendance: 500; Referee: Gevorg Eghoyan |

| 17 September 2016 6 | Ararat Yerevan | 0 – 2 | Banants | Yerevan |
| 18:00 (UTC+4) | K.Brou (yellow card) 5'; S.Kone (yellow card) 44'; Nwabueze (yellow card) 47'; A.Petrosyan (yellow card) 82' | Report | Badoyan 3'; G.Khuloyan (yellow card) 28'; Torrejón (yellow card) 42'; A.Hovhannisyan 76' | Stadium: Republican Stadium; Attendance: 400; Referee: Gevorg Eghoyan |

| 25 September 2016 7 | Ararat Yerevan | 0 – 2 | Gandzasar Kapan | Yerevan |
| 18:00 (UTC+4) | A.Kpehia (yellow card) 65'; S.Koné (yellow card) 89' | Report | Al.Petrosyan (yellow card) 21'; Musonda 41'; A.Khachatryan 53' (pen.) | Stadium: Republican Stadium; Attendance: 200; Referee: Artur Simonyan |

| 1 October 2016 8 | Ararat Yerevan | 0 – 1 | Shirak | Yerevan |
| 19:00 (UTC+4) | V.Arzoyan (yellow card) 29'; Daudov (yellow card) 45'; S.Kone (yellow card) 61'; A.Loretsyan (yellow card) 80' | Report | Hovsepyan 50'; Stošković (yellow card) 55'; D.Hakobyan (yellow card) 70' | Stadium: Republican Stadium; Attendance: 400; Referee: Artur Simonyan |

| 15 October 2016 9 | Pyunik | 4 – 0 | Ararat Yerevan | Yerevan |
| 18:00 (UTC+4) | V.Pogosyan 26', 33'; P.Avetisyan 36'; A.Manucharyan (yellow card) 44'; Hovhannisyan 75' | Report | D.Markosyan (yellow card) 49' | Stadium: FAA Stadium; Attendance: 300; Referee: Artur Safaryan |

| 22 October 2016 10 | Ararat Yerevan | 1 – 2 | Alashkert | Yerevan |
| 18:00 (UTC+4) | R.Safaryan (yellow card) 42'; A.Loretsyan 64' | Report | M.Manasyan 15'; Grigoryan (yellow card) 72'; Minasyan (yellow card) 79' (goal) 90+2' | Stadium: Republican Stadium; Attendance: 300; Referee: Artur Simonyan |

| 26 October 2016 11 | Banants | 0 – 0 | Ararat Yerevan | Yerevan |
| 15:00 (UTC+4) | H. Hakobyan (yellow card) 39'; E.Yeghiazaryan (yellow card) 74'; A.Bareghamyan (yellow card) 75' | Report | G.Poghosyan (yellow card) 54' | Stadium: Banants Stadium; Attendance: 900; Referee: Zaven Hovhannisyan |

| 30 October 2016 12 | Gandzasar Kapan | 1 – 0 | Ararat Yerevan | Kapan |
| 15:00 (UTC+4) | V.Minasyan (yellow card) 43'; Ar.Petrosyan (yellow card) 50'; G.Harutyunyan 74' | Report | Daudov (yellow card) 17'; V.Arzoyan (yellow card) 28'; M.Sahakyan (yellow card) 34'; G.Poghosyan (yellow card) 73'; R.Safaryan (red card) 89' | Stadium: Gandzasar Stadium; Attendance: 600; Referee: Artur Simonyan |

| 4 November 2016 13 | Shirak | 2 – 0 | Ararat Yerevan | Gyumri |
| 15:00 (UTC+4) | V.Ayvazyan 17'; Stošković (yellow card) 25'; Poghosyan 83'; A.Davoyan (yellow card) 88' | Report | S.Mkrtchyan (yellow card) 86'; A.Petrosyan (yellow card) 88' | Stadium: Gyumri City Stadium; Attendance: 600; Referee: Artur Safaryan |

| 19 November 2016 14 | Ararat Yerevan | 1 – 2 | Pyunik | Yerevan |
| 16:00 (UTC+4) | M.Sahakyan (yellow card) 50'; S.Mkrtchyan 90+2' | Report | H.Poghosyan (yellow card) 65'; A.Arakelyan 77'; Ra.Hakobyan (yellow card) 83'; A.Manucharyan 90+3' | Stadium: Republican Stadium; Attendance: 200; Referee: Zaven Hovhannisyan |

| 23 November 2016 15 | Alashkert | 4 – 1 | Ararat Yerevan | Yerevan |
| 15:00 (UTC+4) | M.Manasyan 22', 79', 84', 90' (pen.); Artu.Yedigaryan (yellow card) 72'; Kvekveskiri (yellow card) 77' | Report | R.Safaryan (yellow card) 20' (goal) 56'; R.Ghazaryan (yellow card) 60'; Gareginyan (yellow card) 64' | Stadium: Alashkert Stadium; Attendance: 350; Referee: Artur Safaryan |

| 27 November 2016 16 | Ararat Yerevan | 1 – 1 | Banants | Yerevan |
| 16:00 (UTC+4) | P.Ayvazyan (yellow card) 39'; M.Sahakyan 57'; G.Tumbaryan (yellow card) 76' | Report | Laércio 34' (pen.) (yellow card) 66'; N.Petrosyan (yellow card) 90+3' | Stadium: Republican Stadium; Attendance: 100; Referee: Zaven Hovhannisyan |

| 3 December 2016 17 | Ararat Yerevan | 0 – 1 | Gandzasar Kapan | Yerevan |
| 16:00 (UTC+4) | A.Petrosyan (yellow card) 85' | Report | Claudir 8'; V.Minasyan (yellow card) 13'; Wbeymar (yellow card) 57'; Kpodo (yellow card) 80'; Wal (yellow card) 90+1' | Stadium: Republican Stadium; Attendance: 100; Referee: Suren Baliyan |

| 5 March 2017 18 | Ararat Yerevan | 0 – 1 | Shirak | Yerevan |
| 14:00 (UTC+4) | G.Tumbaryan (yellow card) 11'; Go.Poghosyan (yellow card) 21'; R.Safaryan (yellow card) 58' | Report | V.Bichakhchyan 29'; R.Darbinyan (yellow card) 50'; Hovsepyan (yellow card) 74' | Stadium: Banants-3; Attendance: 300; Referee: Gevorg Eghoyan |

| 10 March 2017 19 | Pyunik | 3 – 0 | Ararat Yerevan | Yerevan |
| 16:00 (UTC+4) | Arutyunyan 10'; Grigoryan (yellow card) 53'; V.Pogosyan (yellow card) 62'; R.Hakobyan 66'; A.Nadiryan 78' | Report | Gareginyan (yellow card) 40'; A.Stefanyan (yellow card) 73' | Stadium: FAA Stadium; Attendance: 700; Referee: Artur Simonyan |

| 17 March 2017 20 | Ararat Yerevan | 0 – 3 | Alashkert | Yerevan |
| 14:00 (UTC+4) | S.Mkrtchyan (yellow card) 42' | Report | Peltier (yellow card) 30'; M.Manasyan 73', 77'; Badoyan 83' | Stadium: Banants-3; Attendance: 500; Referee: Artur Safaryan |

| 31 March 2017 21 | Banants | 2 – 1 | Ararat Yerevan | Yerevan |
| 15:00 (UTC+4) | Injac 35', 67'; E.Yeghiazaryan (yellow card) 38' | Report | G.Tumbaryan 81'; A.Petrosyan (yellow card) 90+3' | Stadium: Banants Stadium; Attendance: 700; Referee: Zaven Hovhannisyan |

| 8 April 2017 22 | Gandzasar Kapan | 2 – 1 | Ararat Yerevan | Yerevan |
| 16:00 (UTC+4) | G.Harutyunyan 6'; Claudir 43' | Report | H.Papazyan (yellow card) 11'; A.Kocharyan 59' (yellow card) 72'; S.Mkrtchyan (yellow card) 78'; A.Petrosyan (yellow card) 82'; G.Poghosyan (yellow card) 90+1' | Stadium: Republican Stadium; Attendance: 100; Referee: Gevorg Eghoyan |

| 15 April 2017 23 | Shirak | 1 – 0 | Ararat Yerevan | Gyumri |
| 16:00 (UTC+4) | V.Bichakhchyan 27'; Safiu (yellow card) 90+5'; Poghosyan (yellow card) 90+5' | Report | R.Yeghiazaryan (yellow card) 73'; P.Ayvazyan (red card) 90+5' | Stadium: Gyumri City Stadium; Attendance: 400; Referee: Artur Safaryan |

| 21 April 2017 24 | Ararat Yerevan | 1 – 0 | Pyunik | Yerevan |
| 17:00 (UTC+4) | R.Safaryan (yellow card) 41'; G.Tumbaryan 58' | Report | Ra.Hakobyan (yellow card) 56'; H.Harutyunyan (yellow card) 69' | Stadium: Mika Stadium; Attendance: 300; Referee: Gevorg Eghoyan |

| 29 April 2017 25 | Alashkert | 3 – 1 | Ararat Yerevan | Yerevan |
| 17:00 (UTC+4) | Arta.Yedigaryan 17', 54' (pen.); Khovbosha (yellow card) 57'; Badoyan 90+3' | Report | E.Mkrtchyan 13' (yellow card) 48' | Stadium: Alashkert Stadium; Attendance: 400; Referee: Zaven Hovhannisyan |

| 6 May 2017 26 | Ararat Yerevan | 1 – 0 | Banants | Yerevan |
| 17:00 (UTC+4) | A.Petrosyan (yellow card) 66'; D.Minasyan 73' | Report | Adams (yellow card) 24'; V.Drobarov (yellow card) 39'; H.Voskanyan | Stadium: Mika Stadium; Attendance: 150; Referee: Gevorg Eghoyan |

| 13 May 2017 27 | Ararat Yerevan | 1 – 2 | Gandzasar Kapan | Yerevan |
| 17:00 (UTC+4) | Gareginyan (yellow card) 14'; G.Tumbaryan (yellow card) 33'; R.Yeghiazaryan 82'; A.Stefanyan (yellow card) 86'; R.Safaryan (yellow card) 89' | Report | Musonda 16'; Claudir 53'; G.Harutyunyan (yellow card) 62'; Memović (yellow card) 72' | Stadium: Mika Stadium; Attendance: 200; Referee: Suren Baliyan |

| 20 May 2017 28 | Ararat Yerevan | 2 – 3 | Shirak | Yerevan |
| 17:00 (UTC+4) | R.Safaryan (yellow card) 6' (goal) 44'; V.Arzoyan (yellow card) 45' (goal) 90' | Report | Hovsepyan 7'; Prljević 36'; Poghosyan 43'; Nwabueze (yellow card) 63'; A.Ayvazov (yellow card) 90+1' | Stadium: Mika Stadium; Attendance: 500; Referee: Artur Ayvazov |

| 27 May 2017 29 | Pyunik | 2 – 1 | Ararat Yerevan | Yerevan |
| 17:00 (UTC+4) | H.Harutyunyan 73', 88'; R.Minasyan (yellow card) 90'; N.Aslanyan (yellow card) 90+5' | Report | G.Tumbaryan 34' (yellow card) 56'; S.Mkrtchyan (yellow card) 40'; S.Metoyan (yellow card) 72'; Go.Poghosyan (yellow card) 87'; A.Petrosyan (yellow card) 89' | Stadium: FAA Stadium; Attendance: 200; Referee: Artur Simonyan |

| 31 May 2017 30 | Ararat Yerevan | 1 – 4 | Alashkert | Yerevan |
| 18:00 (UTC+4) | Gareginyan (yellow card) 45'; M.Arustamyan 73' | Report | M.Manasyan 13', 47'; Arta.Yedigaryan (yellow card) 45'; Khovbosha (yellow card) 51'; S.Filipović (yellow card) 57'; Beglaryan 65'; G.Nranyan 76' | Stadium: Republican Stadium; Attendance: 3,000; Referee: Gevorg Eghoyan |

==== Table ====
| Pos | Team | Pld | W | D | L | GF | GA | GD | Pts | Qualification |
|---|---|---|---|---|---|---|---|---|---|---|
| 1 | Alashkert (C) | 30 | 19 | 7 | 4 | 59 | 26 | +33 | 64 | Qualification for the Champions League first qualifying round |
| 2 | Gandzasar Kapan | 30 | 17 | 6 | 7 | 38 | 24 | +14 | 57 | Qualification for the Europa League first qualifying round (Note: Shirak qualified for Europa League first qualifying round by winning the 2016–17 Armenian Cup. However, since they already qualified for European competition based on their league position, the spot awarded to the cup winners was passed down the league.) |
| 3 | Shirak | 30 | 16 | 5 | 9 | 31 | 24 | +7 | 53 | Qualification for the Europa League first qualifying round |
| 4 | Pyunik | 30 | 12 | 9 | 9 | 35 | 27 | +8 | 45 | Qualification for the Europa League first qualifying round |
| 5 | Banants | 30 | 5 | 6 | 19 | 18 | 44 | −26 | 21 | |
| 6 | Ararat Yerevan | 30 | 3 | 3 | 24 | 17 | 53 | −36 | 12 | |

Source: Football Federation of Armenia (in Armenian), Soccerway
Rules for classification: 1) Points; 2) Play-off (only if deciding champion); 3) Matches won; 4) Head-to-head points; 5) Head-to-head matches won; 6) Head-to-head goal difference; 7) Head-to-head goals scored; 8) Head-to-head away goals scored; 9) Goal difference; 10) Goals scored.
(C) Champions

=== Armenian Cup ===
| 21 September 2016 Quarterfinal 1st leg | Ararat Yerevan | 1 – 2 | Banants | Yerevan |
| 18:00 (UTC+4) | O.Kaina (yellow card) 47'; N.Kpehia 73'; S.Kone (yellow card) 77' | Report | O.Hambardzumyan 6'; E.Movsesyan 46' | Stadium: Republican Stadium; Attendance: 100; Referee: Artur Safaryan |

| 18 October 2016 Quarterfinal 2nd leg | Banants | 0 – 1 (2 – 2 (a) agg.) | Ararat Yerevan | Yerevan |
| 15:00 (UTC+4) | Adams (yellow card) 37'; Burayev (yellow card) 45' | Report | V.Arzoyan (yellow card) 36'; G.Tumbaryan 63'; S.Metoyan (yellow card) 67'; A.Derdzyan (yellow card) 76' | Stadium: Banants Stadium; Attendance: 600; Referee: Artur Safaryan |

== Statistics ==
As of match played 31 May 2017

=== Appearances and goals ===
| No. | Pos | Nat | Player | Total | | Premier League | | Armenian Cup | |
| No. | Pos | Nat | Player | Apps | Goals | Apps | Goals | Apps | Goals |
|---|---|---|---|---|---|---|---|---|---|
| 2 | DF | (Armenia) ARM | Revik Yeghiazaryan | 12 | 1 | 12 | 1 | 0 | 0 |
| 3 | DF | (Armenia) ARM | Gevorg Poghosyan | 27 | 0 | 22+3 | 0 | 2 | 0 |
| 4 | MF | (Armenia) ARM | Karen Avoyan | 10 | 0 | 10 | 0 | 0 | 0 |
| 5 | DF | (Armenia) ARM | Vardan Arzoyan | 20 | 1 | 16+3 | 1 | 1 | 0 |
| 6 | DF | (Armenia) ARM | Argishti Petrosyan | 26 | 0 | 23+1 | 0 | 2 | 0 |
| 8 | DF | (Armenia) ARM | Yuri Gareginyan | 26 | 0 | 20+4 | 0 | 1+1 | 0 |
| 9 | MF | (Armenia) ARM | Andranik Kocharyan | 8 | 1 | 7+1 | 1 | 0 | 0 |
| 10 | MF | (Armenia) ARM | Edgar Mkrtchyan | 9 | 1 | 8+1 | 1 | 0 | 0 |
| 11 | MF | (Armenia) ARM | David G. Grigoryan | 6 | 0 | 2+4 | 0 | 0 | 0 |
| 12 | GK | (Armenia) ARM | Arman Meliksetyan | 3 | 0 | 3 | 0 | 0 | 0 |
| 14 | MF | (Armenia) ARM | Davit Minasyan | 11 | 1 | 6+5 | 1 | 0 | 0 |
| 15 | DF | (Armenia) ARM | Sergey Mkrtchyan | 13 | 1 | 10+3 | 1 | 0 | 0 |
| 17 | FW | (Armenia) ARM | Gegham Tumbaryan | 30 | 4 | 19+9 | 3 | 1+1 | 1 |
| 19 | FW | (Armenia) ARM | Sargis Metoyan | 16 | 0 | 8+6 | 0 | 1+1 | 0 |
| 20 | DF | (Armenia) ARM | Rafael Safaryan | 19 | 2 | 18 | 2 | 1 | 0 |
| 21 | MF | (Armenia) ARM | Ruslan Avagyan | 9 | 0 | 2+6 | 0 | 0+1 | 0 |
| 22 | GK | (Armenia) ARM | Gor Elyazyan | 4 | 0 | 4 | 0 | 0 | 0 |
| 23 | DF | (Armenia) ARM | Gor Poghosyan | 13 | 0 | 12+1 | 0 | 0 | 0 |
| 88 | GK | (Armenia) ARM | Poghos Ayvazyan | 9 | 0 | 9 | 0 | 0 | 0 |
| 90 | MF | (Armenia) ARM | Areg Azatyan | 5 | 0 | 3+2 | 0 | 0 | 0 |
| | DF | (Armenia) ARM | Andranik Hovhannisyan | 1 | 0 | 0+1 | 0 | 0 | 0 |
| | DF | (Armenia) ARM | Erik Nazaryan | 1 | 0 | 0+1 | 0 | 0 | 0 |
| | DF | (Armenia) ARM | Artur Stefanyan | 10 | 0 | 0+10 | 0 | 0 | 0 |
| | MF | (Armenia) ARM | Mikael Arustamyan | 2 | 1 | 0+2 | 1 | 0 | 0 |
| | MF | (Armenia) ARM | Aram Hovsepyan | 1 | 0 | 1 | 0 | 0 | 0 |
| | MF | (Armenia) ARM | Garegin Kirakosyan | 8 | 0 | 3+5 | 0 | 0 | 0 |
| | MF | (Armenia) ARM | Narek Papoyan | 1 | 0 | 1 | 0 | 0 | 0 |
| | MF | (Russia) RUS | Norik Avdalyan | 1 | 0 | 0+1 | 0 | 0 | 0 |
| | FW | (Armenia) ARM | David Ghandilyan | 2 | 0 | 1+1 | 0 | 0 | 0 |
| | FW | (Armenia) ARM | Hovhannes Papazyan | 8 | 0 | 5+3 | 0 | 0 | 0 |
Players who left Ararat Yerevan during the season:
| 2 | DF | (Armenia) ARM | Vahe Matirosyan | 3 | 0 | 3 | 0 | 0 | 0 |
| 3 | DF | (Armenia) ARM | Sergei Avagimyan | 2 | 0 | 2 | 0 | 0 | 0 |
| 4 | DF | (Ivory Coast) CIV | Souleymane Kone | 5 | 0 | 4 | 0 | 1 | 0 |
| 5 | DF | (Armenia) ARM | Norayr Grigoryan | 8 | 0 | 7 | 0 | 1 | 0 |
| 7 | MF | (Armenia) ARM | Aram Loretsyan | 16 | 1 | 11+3 | 1 | 2 | 0 |
| 8 | MF | (South Africa) RSA | Happy Simelela | 4 | 0 | 3+1 | 0 | 0 | 0 |
| 9 | FW | (Armenia) ARM | Mher Sahakyan | 10 | 1 | 8+1 | 1 | 0+1 | 0 |
| 9 | FW | (Armenia) ARM | Gevorg Nranyan | 5 | 0 | 2+3 | 0 | 0 | 0 |
| 10 | FW | (Cameroon) CMR | Oumarou Kaina | 8 | 0 | 7 | 0 | 1 | 0 |
| 10 | MF | (Ukraine) UKR | Marat Daudov | 10 | 0 | 7+3 | 0 | 0 | 0 |
| 11 | MF | (Armenia) ARM | Rafael Ghazaryan | 11 | 0 | 7+3 | 0 | 1 | 0 |
| 14 | MF | (Ivory Coast) CIV | Kouadio Brou | 7 | 0 | 5+1 | 0 | 1 | 0 |
| 14 | DF | (Armenia) ARM | Hakob Loretsyan | 1 | 0 | 0+1 | 0 | 0 | 0 |
| 15 | MF | (Armenia) ARM | Petros Ter-Petrosyan | 11 | 0 | 0+9 | 0 | 0+2 | 0 |
| 18 | DF | (Armenia) ARM | Gorik Khachatryan | 7 | 0 | 3+3 | 0 | 1 | 0 |
| 19 | MF | (Ivory Coast) CIV | Nassim Aaron Kpehia | 11 | 2 | 7+2 | 1 | 1+1 | 1 |
| 20 | MF | (Nigeria) NGA | Pol Asu Oshi | 1 | 0 | 1 | 0 | 0 | 0 |
| 23 | FW | (Nigeria) NGA | Kyrian Nwabueze | 7 | 2 | 4+2 | 2 | 1 | 0 |
| 77 | GK | (Armenia) ARM | Aram Ayrapetyan | 16 | 0 | 14 | 0 | 2 | 0 |
| | DF | (Armenia) ARM | Davit Markosyan | 4 | 0 | 4 | 0 | 0 | 0 |
| | MF | (Armenia) ARM | Armen Derdzyan | 10 | 0 | 7+2 | 0 | 1 | 0 |

=== Goal scorers ===
| Place | Position | Nation | Number | Name | Premier League | Armenian Cup | Total |
|---|---|---|---|---|---|---|---|
| 1 | MF | (Armenia) | 17 | Gegham Tumbaryan | 3 | 1 | 4 |
| 2 | FW | (Nigeria) | 23 | Kyrian Nwabueze | 2 | 0 | 2 |
| 2 | DF | (Armenia) | 20 | Rafael Safaryan | 2 | 0 | 2 |
| 2 | MF | (Ivory Coast) | 19 | Nassim Aaron Kpehia | 1 | 1 | 2 |
| 5 | MF | (Armenia) | 7 | Aram Loretsyan | 1 | 0 | 1 |
| 5 | MF | (Armenia) | 14 | Sergey Mkrtchyan | 1 | 0 | 1 |
| 5 | MF | (Armenia) | 9 | Mher Sahakyan | 1 | 0 | 1 |
| 5 | MF | (Armenia) | 9 | Andranik Kocharyan | 1 | 0 | 1 |
| 5 | MF | (Armenia) | 10 | Edgar Mkrtchyan | 1 | 0 | 1 |
| 5 | MF | (Armenia) | 14 | David Minasyan | 1 | 0 | 1 |
| 5 | DF | (Armenia) | 2 | Revik Yeghiazaryan | 1 | 0 | 1 |
| 5 | DF | (Armenia) | 5 | Vardan Arzoyan | 1 | 0 | 1 |
| 5 | MF | (Armenia) | | Mikael Arustamyan | 1 | 0 | 1 |
| | | | | TOTALS | 17 | 2 | 19 |

=== Clean sheets ===
| Place | Position | Nation | Number | Name | Premier League | Armenian Cup | Total |
|---|---|---|---|---|---|---|---|
| 1 | GK | (Armenia) | 77 | Aram Ayrapetyan | 2 | 1 | 3 |
| 2 | GK | (Armenia) | 22 | Gor Elyazyan | 1 | 0 | 1 |
| 2 | GK | (Armenia) | 88 | Poghos Ayvazyan | 1 | 0 | 1 |
| | | | | TOTALS | 4 | 1 | 5 |

=== Disciplinary record ===
| Number | Nation | Position | Name | Premier League | | Armenian Cup | | Total | |
| Number | Nation | Position | Name | Booked | Sent off (straight red) | Booked | Sent off (straight red) | Booked | Sent off (straight red) |
| 2 | (Armenia) | DF | Revik Yeghiazaryan | 1 | 0 | 0 | 0 | 1 | 0 |
| 3 | (Armenia) | DF | Gevorg Poghosyan | 2 | 0 | 0 | 0 | 2 | 0 |
| 4 | (Armenia) | DF | Artur Stefanyan | 2 | 0 | 0 | 0 | 2 | 0 |
| 5 | (Armenia) | DF | Vardan Arzoyan | 3 | 0 | 1 | 0 | 4 | 0 |
| 6 | (Armenia) | DF | Argishti Petrosyan | 7 | 0 | 0 | 0 | 7 | 0 |
| 8 | (Armenia) | DF | Yuri Gareginyan | 4 | 0 | 0 | 0 | 4 | 0 |
| 9 | (Armenia) | MF | Hovhannes Papazyan | 1 | 0 | 0 | 0 | 1 | 0 |
| 10 | (Armenia) | MF | Edgar Mkrtchyan | 1 | 0 | 0 | 0 | 1 | 0 |
| 15 | (Armenia) | MF | Sergey Mkrtchyan | 4 | 0 | 0 | 0 | 4 | 0 |
| 17 | (Armenia) | MF | Gegham Tumbaryan | 4 | 0 | 0 | 0 | 4 | 0 |
| 18 | (Armenia) | DF | Gorik Khachatryan | 1 | 0 | 0 | 0 | 1 | 0 |
| 19 | (Armenia) | FW | Sargis Metoyan | 1 | 0 | 1 | 0 | 2 | 0 |
| 22 | (Armenia) | GK | Poghos Ayvazyan | 1 | 1 | 0 | 0 | 1 | 1 |
| 23 | (Armenia) | DF | Gor Poghosyan | 3 | 0 | 0 | 0 | 3 | 0 |
| | (Armenia) | MF | Armen Derdzyan | 0 | 0 | 1 | 0 | 1 | 0 |
| | (Armenia) | MF | Andranik Kocharyan | 1 | 0 | 0 | 0 | 1 | 0 |
Players who left Ararat Yerevan during the season:
| 3 | (Armenia) | DF | Sergei Avagimyan | 1 | 0 | 0 | 0 | 1 | 0 |
| 4 | (Ivory Coast) | DF | Souleymane Kone | 3 | 0 | 1 | 0 | 4 | 0 |
| 7 | (Armenia) | MF | Aram Loretsyan | 1 | 0 | 0 | 0 | 1 | 0 |
| 8 | (South Africa) | MF | Happy Simelela | 1 | 0 | 0 | 0 | 1 | 0 |
| 9 | (Armenia) | FW | Mher Sahakyan | 2 | 0 | 0 | 0 | 2 | 0 |
| 10 | (Cameroon) | FW | Oumarou Kaina | 1 | 0 | 1 | 0 | 2 | 0 |
| 10 | (Ukraine) | MF | Marat Daudov | 2 | 0 | 0 | 0 | 2 | 0 |
| 11 | (Armenia) | MF | Rafael Ghazaryan | 1 | 0 | 0 | 0 | 1 | 0 |
| 14 | (Ivory Coast) | MF | Kouadio Brou | 2 | 0 | 0 | 0 | 2 | 0 |
| 15 | (Armenia) | MF | Petros Ter-Petrosyan | 1 | 0 | 0 | 0 | 1 | 0 |
| 19 | (Ivory Coast) | MF | Nassim Aaron Kpehia | 2 | 0 | 0 | 0 | 2 | 0 |
| 20 | (Armenia) | DF | Rafael Safaryan | 6 | 1 | 0 | 0 | 6 | 1 |
| 23 | (Nigeria) | FW | Kyrian Nwabueze | 3 | 0 | 0 | 0 | 3 | 0 |
| | (Armenia) | MF | Davit Markosyan | 1 | 0 | 0 | 0 | 1 | 0 |
| | | | TOTALS | 63 | 2 | 5 | 0 | 68 | 2 |
