= Atlético Madrid C =

- Full name: Club Atlético de Madrid C
- Founded: 1972
- Ground: Cerro del Espino, Majadahonda, Madrid; Spain
- Capacity: 3,865
- President: Enrique Cerezo
- Head coach: Manel Ruano
- League: Segunda Federación – Group 5
- 2025–26: Tercera Federación – Group 7, 1st of 18 (champions)
Home colours	Away colours

Atlético Madrid C is a Spanish football club that played in the Tercera División and played their home games at the Nuevo Cerro del Espino. They are the second reserve team of Atlético Madrid, and play in Segunda Federación – Group 5.

== History ==
CP Amorós logo used until 2000

In 1972, both a C-team of Atlético Madrid and Amorós were founded separately, with the former club being named Club Atlético de Madrid Aficionados and the latter club being named Asociación de Padres de Alumnos Colegio Amorós. In 1976, Atlético Madrid Aficionados was renamed Atlético Madrileño Club de Fútbol Aficionado, and ceased activities in 1985 after three seasons in Tercera División.

Amorós was renamed Club Polideportivo Colegio Amorós in 1989, and was incorporated into Atlético's structure in 1994; officially named Club Polideportivo Amorós, the club was known as Atlético Amorós. In 2000, the club was renamed Club Atlético Aviación and adopted Atlético's colors and logo.

In 2005, Atlético Aviación changed its name to Club Atlético de Madrid C. In April 2015, after the relegation of Atlético Madrid B to the fourth division, Atleti C ceased activities.

On 1 July 2024, CU Collado Villalba reached a ten-year agreement with Atlético Madrid to become their second reserve team; for the 2025–26 season onwards, the club will be fully incorporated into Atleti's structure and will be replaced by Atlético C. On 19 June 2025, Collado Villalba was officially absorbed by Atleti; their Tercera Federación spot went to Atlético C, while their youth sides remained under the name of Club Atlético Villalba.

== Season to season ==
=== Atlético Madrid Aficionados/Atlético Madrileño ===
Season	Tier	Division	Place	Copa del Rey
1973–74	4	Reg. Pref.	9th	
1974–75	4	Reg. Pref.	12th	
1975–76	4	Reg. Pref.	15th	
1976–77	4	Reg. Pref.	14th	
1977–78	5	Reg. Pref.	8th	
1978–79	5	Reg. Pref.	12th	

Season	Tier	Division	Place	Copa del Rey
1979–80	5	Reg. Pref.	12th	
1980–81	5	Reg. Pref.	13th	
1981–82	5	Reg. Pref.	3rd	
1982–83	4	3ª	15th	
1983–84	4	3ª	13th	
1984–85	4	3ª	16th	

- 3 seasons in Tercera División

=== Amorós ===
Season	Tier	Division	Place	Copa del Rey
1974–75	8	3ª Reg.	4th	
1975–76	7	3ª Reg. P.	2nd	
1976–77	6	2ª Reg.	8th	
1977–78	7	2ª Reg.	10th	
1978–79	7	2ª Reg.	15th	
1979–80	8	3ª Reg. P.	6th	
1980–81	8	3ª Reg. P.	15th	
1981–82	9	3ª Reg.	7th	
1982–83	8	3ª Reg. P.	11th	
1983–84	8	3ª Reg. P.	12th	

Season	Tier	Division	Place	Copa del Rey
1984–85	8	3ª Reg. P.	9th	
1985–86	8	3ª Reg. P.	1st	
1986–87	7	2ª Reg.	4th	
1987–88	6	1ª Reg.	6th	
1988–89	6	1ª Reg.	1st	
1989–90	5	Reg. Pref.	5th	
1990–91	5	Reg. Pref.	15th	
1991–92	6	1ª Reg.	6th	
1992–93	6	1ª Reg.	2nd	
1993–94	5	Reg. Pref.	7th	

=== Atlético Amorós/Atlético Aviación/Atlético Madrid C ===
Season	Tier	Division	Place
1994–95	5	Reg. Pref.	1st
1995–96	4	3ª	5th
1996–97	4	3ª	13th
1997–98	4	3ª	14th
1998–99	4	3ª	4th
1999–2000	4	3ª	9th
2000–01	4	3ª	19th
2001–02	5	Reg. Pref.	2nd
2002–03	4	3ª	12th
2003–04	4	3ª	13th
2004–05	4	3ª	13th
2005–06	4	3ª	16th
2006–07	4	3ª	16th
2007–08	4	3ª	10th
2008–09	4	3ª	14th
2009–10	4	3ª	11th
2010–11	4	3ª	15th
2011–12	4	3ª	13th
2012–13	4	3ª	13th
2013–14	4	3ª	14th

Season	Tier	Division	Place
2014–15	4	3ª	13th
2015–2025	DNP		
2025–26	5	3ª Fed.	1st
2026–27	4	2ª Fed.	

- 1 season in Segunda Federación
- 19 seasons in Tercera División
- 1 season in Tercera Federación

== Former players ==
- (Iran) Saeid Ezatolahi
- (Spain) Roberto Casabella
- (Lebanon) Nader Matar
- (Spain) David Cubillo
- (Spain) Iván Cuellar Sacristán
- (Spain) Joel Robles
- (Spain) Jorge Pulido
- (Spain) Pedro Martín
- (Tunisia) Kader Oueslati
