= Kyrian Nwabueze =

Nigerian footballer (born 1992)

Personal information
- Full name: Kyrian Chinazorm Nwabueze
- Date of birth: 11 December 1992 (age 33)
- Place of birth: Nigeria
- Height: 1.83 m (6 ft 0 in)
- Position: Forward

College career
| Years | Team | Apps | (Gls) |
| 2013 | El Camino Warriors | 20 | (19) |

Senior career*
| Years | Team | Apps | (Gls) |
| 2013 | Los Angeles Misioneros | 11 | (1) |
| 2014 | Banants | 4 | (0) |
| 2014–2015 | Los Angeles Misioneros | 7 | (6) |
| 2015–2016 | Tulsa Roughnecks | 23 | (5) |
| 2016 | Ararat Yerevan | 17 | (3) |
| 2017 | Shirak | 10 | (1) |
| 2017 | Gorica | 9 | (5) |
| 2018–2019 | Pobeda | 14 | (6) |
| 2019 | Drita | 12 | (7) |
| 2019–2021 | Laçi | 46 | (31) |
| 2021–2023 | Kuala Lumpur City | 1 | (0) |
| Total | | 154 | (65) |
- * Club domestic league appearances and goals as of 10:48, 16 June 2021 (UTC)

Kyrian Chinazorm Nwabueze (born 11 December 1992) is a Nigerian professional footballer who plays as a forward.

== Career ==
=== Youth and college ===
Nwabueze played one year of college soccer at El Camino College in 2013, where he scored 19 goals.

=== Professional ===
Nwabueze had spells with USL PDL club Los Angeles Misioneros in 2013 and 2014, while also playing with Armenian side FC Banants in 2014, where he made six appearances and scored one goal in all competitions. He signed with United Soccer League club Tulsa Roughnecks in March 2015 making his fully professional debut during the season opener on 28 March 2015, entering the game at the 62nd minute.

In February 2016, Nwabueze signed for Armenian side Ararat Yerevan, leaving the club on 28 October 2016.

In January 2017, Nwabueze went on trial with FC Shirak, signing a two-year contract with Shirak on 28 February 2017. At the beginning of August 2017, Nwabueze left Shirak, signing for Slovenian PrvaLiga side ND Gorica on a three-year contract on 15 September 2017.

== Career statistics ==
As of match played 20 August 2020

Appearances and goals by club, season and competition
| Club | Season | League | | | National cup | | Continental | | Total | |
| Club | Season | Division | Apps | Goals | Apps | Goals | Apps | Goals | Apps | Goals |
|---|---|---|---|---|---|---|---|---|---|---|
| Banants | 2013–14 | Armenian Premier League | 4 | 0 | 1 | 0 | — | | 5 | 0 |
| Tulsa Roughnecks | 2015 | USL | 23 | 5 | 1 | 0 | — | | 24 | 5 |
| Ararat Yerevan | 2015–16 | Armenian Premier League | 11 | 1 | 0 | 0 | — | | 11 | 1 |
| Ararat Yerevan | 2016–17 | Armenian Premier League | 6 | 2 | 1 | 0 | — | | 7 | 2 |
| Ararat Yerevan | Total | | 17 | 3 | 1 | 0 | – | – | 18 | 3 |
| Shirak | 2016–17 | Armenian Premier League | 10 | 1 | 2 | 2 | 0 | 0 | 12 | 3 |
| Shirak | 2017–18 | Armenian Premier League | 0 | 0 | 0 | 0 | 2 | 0 | 2 | 0 |
| Shirak | Total | | 10 | 1 | 2 | 2 | 2 | 0 | 14 | 3 |
| Gorica | 2017–18 | Slovenian PrvaLiga | 9 | 5 | 1 | 0 | — | | 10 | 5 |
| Pobeda | 2018–19 | 1. MFL | 14 | 6 | 1 | 0 | — | | 15 | 6 |
| FC Drita | 2018-19 | Football Superleague of Kosovo | 12 | 7 | 1 | 0 | — | | 13 | 7 |
| KF Laçi | 2019–20 | Kategoria Superiore | 31 | 24 | 2 | 1 | 2 | 1 | 35 | 26 |
| Career total | | | 113 | 51 | 10 | 3 | 4 | 1 | 134 | 55 |

== Honours ==
Shirak

- Armenian Cup: 2016–17
