= Brahima Bruno Koné =

Ivorian footballer

Personal information
- Full name: Brahima Bruno Koné
- Date of birth: March 30, 1995 (age 31)
- Place of birth: Adjamé, Ivory Coast
- Height: 1.86 m (6 ft 1 in)
- Position: Forward

Team information
- Current team: Panargiakos
- Number: 17

Senior career*
Years	Team	Apps	(Gls)
2016	Mika	6	(0)
2016	Ararat Yerevan	0	(0)
2017	Saint George	0	(0)
2017–2018	Anagennisi Karditsa	28	(2)
2018–2019	Irodotos	10	(0)
2019–2020	Kallithea	0	(0)
2020	Ialysos	7	(5)
2020–2021	Ermis Aradippou	15	(1)
2021	Diagoras	15	(3)
2021–2024	Kallithea	11	(0)
2024–	Panargiakos	3	(0)
- * Club domestic league appearances and goals as of 13 February 2022

Brahima Bruno Koné (born 30 March 1995) is an Ivorian professional footballer who plays as a forward for Greek Super League 2 club Panargiakos F.C.

== Career ==
On 14 October 2016, Kone was released by Ararat Yerevan without playing a game for the club. In October 2017, Kone secured a visa for Greece, allowing him to complete his signing for Anagennisi Karditsa.

== Career statistics ==
=== Club ===
As of match played 25 June 2019

Appearances and goals by club, season and competition
Club	Season	League			National Cup		Continental		Other		Total	
Club	Season	Division	Apps	Goals	Apps	Goals	Apps	Goals	Apps	Goals	Apps	Goals
Mika	2015–16	Armenian Premier League	6	0	1	0	–		–		7	0
Ararat Yerevan	2016–17	Armenian Premier League	0	0	0	0	–		–		0	0
Saint George	2016–17	Ethiopian Premier League					2	0	–		2	0
Anagennisi Karditsa	2017–18	Football League	28	2	2	0	–		–		30	2
Irodotos	2018–19	Football League	10	0	1	0	–		–		11	0
Career total			44	2	4	0	2	0	-	-	50	2

== Honours ==
=== Club ===
Saint George:

- Ethiopian Premier League (1): 2016–17
