= Sergey Usenya =

Belarusian footballer

Personal information
- Date of birth: 4 March 1988 (age 38)
- Place of birth: Minsk, Belarusian SSR
- Height: 1.76 m (5 ft 9 1/2 in)
- Position: Defender

Youth career
- 2004–2007: BATE Borisov

Senior career*
Years	Team	Apps	(Gls)
2007–2010	BATE Borisov	0	(0)
2007	→ Volna Pinsk (loan)	11	(0)
2008	→ Belshina Bobruisk (loan)	14	(0)
2009	→ Baranovichi (loan)	22	(0)
2010	→ Rudensk (loan)	14	(2)
2011	Torpedo-BelAZ Zhodino	0	(0)
2011	→ Gorodeya (loan)	14	(0)
2012–2014	Gorodeya	72	(1)
2015	Alashkert	17	(0)
2016–2020	Gorodeya	88	(1)
2021	Dinamo Brest	7	(0)
2022–2023	Smorgon	34	(0)
2024–2025	Molodechno	40	(1)
- * Club domestic league appearances and goals as of 6 April 2026

Sergey Usenya (Belarusian: Сяргей Усеня; Russian: Сергей Усеня; born 4 March 1988) is a Belarusian former professional footballer who last played for Molodechno.

== Honours ==
Alashkert

- Armenian Premier League champion: 2015–16
