= Roberto Casabella =

Spanish footballer (born 1987)

Personal information
- Full name: Roberto García Casabella
- Date of birth: 9 January 1987 (age 39)
- Place of birth: Madrid, Spain
- Height: 1.79 m (5 ft 10 in)
- Position: Midfielder

Youth career
- Real Madrid
- Atlético Madrid

Senior career*
Years	Team	Apps	(Gls)
2006–2007	Atlético Madrid C		
2006–2008	Atlético Madrid B	20	(0)
2008–2009	San Fernando	25	(0)
2009–2010	Puertollano	24	(2)
2010–2012	Lorca Atlético	35	(1)
2011	→ Almeria B (loan)	11	(0)
2012	Conquense	11	(0)
2012–2013	Milsami Orhei	14	(0)
2013–2014	Barnet	11	(0)
2014	Thunder Bay Chill	11	(0)
2014–2015	San Fernando	19	(1)
2015	Ararat Yerevan	0	(0)
2015–2016	Rayo Cantabria	9	(0)
2016	Villarrubia	4	(0)
2016–2017	Sanluqueño	9	(0)
2017	Villarrubia		
- * Club domestic league appearances and goals as of 8 November 2017

Roberto García Casabella (born 9 January 1987) is a Spanish footballer who last played as a defensive midfielder for Villarrubia CF.

== Career ==
He began his career in the Real Madrid youth team, before moving to Atlético Madrid where he played for the B and C teams.

Between 2006 and 2012, he played in the Segunda División B for Atlético Madrid B, San Fernando, Puertollano, Lorca Atlético, Almeria B (loan) and Conquense.

In the summer of 2012 he joined Moldovan National Division side Milsami Orhei, playing in the Moldovan Super Cup final win over Sheriff Tiraspol, as well as 90 minutes of the 4-2 UEFA Europa League home win over Aktobe, and the subsequent away leg 0–3 defeat that eliminated the Moldovan side 4–5 on aggregate.

In July 2013, he was on trial at Barnet in the Conference Premier, with compatriot Luisma Villa. Both players had their signings confirmed on 3 August 2013. Casabella played frequently at the start of the season, but struggled with injuries from October onwards. After 12 appearances in all competitions, all but one in the league, he was released on 14 April 2014.

After leaving the Bees, Casabella joined Thunder Bay Chill of the USL Premier Development League. In August 2014, he re-joined San Fernando.

In June 2015, Casabella signed for Armenian Premier League side FC Ararat Yerevan. Less than a month later, without playing a game for Ararat Yerevan, Casabella moved back to Spain, signing for Rayo Cantabria.

== Honours ==
Milsami Orhei

- Moldovan Super Cup: 2012
