= Grigori Postanogov =

Russian footballer

Personal information
- Full name: Grigori Grigoryevich Postanogov
- Date of birth: 27 June 1995 (age 31)
- Height: 1.70 m (5 ft 7 in)
- Position: Forward

Senior career*
Years	Team	Apps	(Gls)
2012	FC Baltika-M-Prodgorod Guryevsk		
2012–2013	FC Kuban Krasnodar	0	(0)
2015–2016	FC Baltika Kaliningrad	14	(0)
2020	FC Volna Nizhny Novgorod Oblast	10	(1)
- * Club domestic league appearances and goals

Grigori Grigoryevich Postanogov (Russian: Григорий Григорьевич Постаногов; born 27 June 1995) is a Russian former football player.

== Club career ==
He made his professional debut in the Russian Football National League for FC Baltika Kaliningrad on 11 July 2015 in a game against FC Shinnik Yaroslavl.
