= Sargis Karapetyan =

Armenian footballer

Personal information
- Full name: Sargis Karapetyan
- Date of birth: 24 April 1990 (age 36)
- Place of birth: Yerevan, Armenia
- Height: 1.82 m (6 ft 0 in)
- Position: Midfielder

Youth career
- 2007–2008: Banants

Senior career*
Years	Team	Apps	(Gls)
2006–2013	Banants	144	(2)
2013–2015	Mika	32	(1)
2015–2017	Ararat Yerevan	2	(0)
2017	CSKA Pamir Dushanbe		

International career^{‡}
2009	Armenia	1	(0)
- * Club domestic league appearances and goals as of 4 December 2017 ‡ National team caps and goals as of 4 December 2017

Sargis Karapetyan (Armenian: Սարգիս Կարապետյան; born 24 April 1990) is an Armenian professional midfielder who last played for CSKA Pamir Dushanbe.

== Career ==
=== Club ===
In March 2017, Karapetyan was registered by Tajikistan Higher League side CSKA Pamir Dushanbe for their upcoming season.

== Career statistics ==
=== International ===
Armenia national team
Year	Apps	Goals
2009	1	0
Total	1	0

Statistics accurate as of match played 11 February 2009
