= Sékou Fofana (footballer, born 1980) =

Malian footballer

Personal information
- Full name: Sékou Mamadou Fofana
- Date of birth: 26 September 1980 (age 46)
- Place of birth: Bamako, Mali
- Height: 1.79 m (5 ft 10 in)
- Position: Defender

Youth career
- Stade Malien

Senior career*
Years	Team	Apps	(Gls)
2000–2005	Stade Malien		
2005–2006	USM Annaba	21	(0)
2006–2007	Shahin Bushehr F.C.		
2007–2009	Mes Kerman	30	(0)
2009–2010	Mes Rafsanjan	22	(0)
2010–2012	Iranjavan Bushehr		
2012–2013	Shahrdari Bandar Abbas F.C.		
2013–2014	FC Banants	27	(1)
2015–2016	Alashkert FC	25	(0)

International career
2001	Mali	1	(0)
- * Club domestic league appearances and goals

Sékou Fofana (born 26 September 1980) is a Malian former footballer who played as a defender.

Fofana featured for Mali at the 1997 FIFA U-17 World Championship.
