= Souleymane Kone =

Ivorian footballer (born 1996)

Personal information
- Date of birth: 1 May 1996 (age 30)
- Place of birth: Grand-Bassam, Ivory Coast
- Height: 1.92 m (6 ft 4 in)
- Position: Centre-back

Youth career
- ASEC Mimosas
- 2012: CSKA Sofia

Senior career*
| Years | Team | Apps | (Gls) |
| 2015–2016 | Ararat Yerevan | 39 | (1) |
| 2017–2019 | Djurgårdens IF | 0 | (0) |
| 2018–2019 | → DAC Dunajská Streda (loan) | 25 | (2) |
| 2019–2021 | Westerlo | 11 | (0) |
| 2021 | Wisła Kraków | 7 | (0) |
| 2022–2024 | SKN St. Pölten | 10 | (1) |
- * Club domestic league appearances and goals as of 25 May 2024

Souleymane Kone (born 1 May 1996) is an Ivorian professional footballer who plays as a centre-back.

== Career ==
On 10 February 2015, Ararat Yerevan announced the signing of Kone.

On 23 December 2016, Allsvenskan club Djurgårdens IF announced the signing of Kone on a three-year contract. On 10 January 2018 Kone joined DAC Dunajská Streda on loan until 31 December 2018.

Kone joined Austrian 2. Liga club SKN St. Pölten on 19 May 2022 after a successful trial. He had been a free agent for almost a year, having left Wisła Kraków in June 2021.

== Career statistics ==
As of match played 16 September 2022

Appearances and goals by club, season and competition
| Club | Season | League | | | National cup (Note: Includes Armenian Cup, Svenska Cupen, Slovak Cup, Belgian Cup, Austrian Cup) | | Continental | | Other | | Total | |
| Club | Season | Division | Apps | Goals | Apps | Goals | Apps | Goals | Apps | Goals | Apps | Goals |
|---|---|---|---|---|---|---|---|---|---|---|---|---|
| Ararat Yerevan | 2014–15 | Armenian Premier League | 10 | 0 | 0 | 0 | — | | — | | 10 | 0 |
| Ararat Yerevan | 2015–16 | Armenian Premier League | 25 | 1 | 2 | 0 | — | | — | | 27 | 1 |
| Ararat Yerevan | 2016–17 | Armenian Premier League | 4 | 0 | 1 | 0 | — | | — | | 5 | 0 |
| Ararat Yerevan | Total | | 39 | 1 | 3 | 0 | — | | — | | 42 | 1 |
| Djurgårdens IF | 2017 | Allsvenskan | 0 | 0 | 2 | 0 | — | | — | | 2 | 0 |
| Djurgårdens IF | 2018 | Allsvenskan | 0 | 0 | 0 | 0 | 0 | 0 | — | | 0 | 0 |
| Djurgårdens IF | Total | | 0 | 0 | 2 | 0 | 0 | 0 | — | | 2 | 0 |
| DAC Dunajská Streda (loan) | 2017–18 | Fortuna Liga | 1 | 0 | 0 | 0 | — | | — | | 1 | 0 |
| DAC Dunajská Streda (loan) | 2018–19 | Fortuna Liga | 24 | 2 | 3 | 0 | 1 (Note: Appearance(s) in UEFA Europa League) | 0 | — | | 28 | 2 |
| DAC Dunajská Streda (loan) | Total | | 25 | 2 | 3 | 0 | 1 | 0 | — | | 29 | 2 |
| Westerlo | 2019–20 | Proximus League | 11 | 0 | 3 | 0 | — | | — | | 14 | 0 |
| Wisła Kraków | 2020–21 | Ekstraklasa | 7 | 0 | 0 | 0 | — | | — | | 7 | 0 |
| SKN St. Pölten | 2022–23 | 2. Liga | 9 | 1 | 2 | 0 | — | | — | | 11 | 1 |
| Career total | | | 91 | 4 | 13 | 0 | 1 | 0 | — | | 105 | 4 |
