= Marat Daudov =

Ukrainian footballer

Personal information
- Full name: Marat Mahomedovych Daudov
- Date of birth: 3 August 1989 (age 37)
- Place of birth: Voroshilovgrad, Soviet Union (now Ukraine)
- Height: 1.70 m (5 ft 7 in)
- Position: Midfielder

Youth career
- 2002–2006: Zorya Luhansk

Senior career*
Years	Team	Apps	(Gls)
2006–2008	Zorya Luhansk	0	(0)
2007	→ Stal Alchevsk (loan)	15	(1)
2008–2012	Helios Kharkiv	107	(13)
2012–2013	Naftovyk-Ukrnafta Okhtyrka	30	(4)
2013	Sumy	25	(5)
2014	Poltava	8	(0)
2014–2015	Gandzasar	14	(2)
2015–2016	Hirnyk-Sport Komsomolsk	9	(0)
2016	Alashkert	0	(0)
2016	Ararat Yerevan	10	(0)
2017–2018	Avanhard Kramatorsk	42	(4)
2018–2019	Veres Rivne	15	(0)
2019–2021	Polissya Zhytomyr	31	(3)
2021	Kramatorsk	12	(2)
- * Club domestic league appearances and goals as of 31 December 2021

Marat Mahomedovych Daudov (Ukrainian: Марат Магомедович Даудов; born 3 August 1989) is a Ukrainian professional football midfielder.

Daudov began his playing career with FC Zorya Luhansk's youth and then double teams. Then he played on loan in FC Stal Alchevsk. Since 2008, he has contract with FC Helios Kharkiv.
