= Citrus Stadium =

Stadium in Glendora, California

Coordinates: 34.131416°N 117.882743°W

Citrus Stadium is a 10,000-capacity multi-use stadium located in Glendora, California.

The stadium, which features a running track, serves as home to American football, athletics, and soccer for Citrus College and the USL Premier Development League side FC Golden State Force.

It is also the home stadium for several area High Schools, including Azusa HS (Azusa), and Glendora HS (Glendora).
