= Gogita Gogatishvili =

Georgian footballer

Personal information
- Date of birth: 2 February 1990 (age 36)
- Place of birth: Tbilisi, Georgian SSR
- Height: 1.77 m (5 ft 9 1/2 in)
- Position: Midfielder

Senior career*
Years	Team	Apps	(Gls)
2011–2012	STU Tbilisi	39	(19)
2013	Sioni Bolnisi	2	(0)
2013	Chikhura Sachkhere	0	(0)
2014	Gagra	29	(20)
2015	Lazika Zugdidi	14	(9)
2015–2016	Gandzasar Kapan	40	(4)
2017	Dinamo Minsk	2	(0)
2017	Dila Gori	7	(0)
2018	Gagra	17	(3)
2018	Shevardeni-1906 Tbilisi	18	(3)
2019	Zugdidi	3	(0)
2019–2021	FC Tbilisi City		
- * Club domestic league appearances and goals as of 23:23, 13 May 2019 (UTC)

Gogita Gogatishvili (Georgian: გოგიტა გოგატიშვილი; born 2 February 1990) is a Georgian former professional footballer.
