= Duško Dukić =

Serbian/Croatian footballer

Personal information
- Full name: Duško Dukić
- Date of birth: 21 June 1986 (age 40)
- Place of birth: Zadar, SFR Yugoslavia
- Height: 1.81 m (5 ft 11 1/2 in)
- Position: Right-back

Youth career
- 1995–2001: Jedinstvo Paraćin
- 2001–2004: Partizan

Senior career*
Years	Team	Apps	(Gls)
2004–2006	Jedinstvo Paraćin	30	(1)
2006	→ Vlasina (loan)	18	(0)
2007	Vitebsk	4	(0)
2007	Jagodina	6	(0)
2008–2010	Hajduk Kula	35	(1)
2010	Poli Timişoara	0	(0)
2011–2013	Jagodina	49	(0)
2014	Voždovac	6	(0)
2014–2015	Spartak Subotica	19	(0)
2015	Alashkert	9	(1)
2016	Bylis	16	(0)
2016	Korabi Peshkopi	11	(0)
2017	Jagodina	11	(1)
2017–2018	Panargiakos		
2018–2020	Borac Paraćin		
2020–2021	Jedinstvo Paraćin		
- * Club domestic league appearances and goals as of 7 February 2018

Duško Dukić (Serbian Cyrillic: Душко Дукић; born 21 June 1986) is a Serbian retired football defender.

== Club career ==
=== Early career ===
Born in Zadar, SR Croatia, SFR Yugoslavia, Dukić began his youth career in Serbia at Jedinstvo Paraćin where he played for six years. From 2001, he was at Partizan's youth squad for three years.

=== Jedinstvo Paraćin ===
He signed his first professional contract in 2004 for local club Jedinstvo Paraćin. The right-back scored one goal in his thirty appearances for the club.

=== Vlasina ===
He was loaned out for season 2006-07 at FK Vlasina making eighteen appearances.

=== FC Vitebsk ===
He signed with Vitebsk in 2007 winter for just six months, playing four matches.

=== Jagodina ===
This time he was loaned out to Jagodina for a few months.

=== Albania ===
He played with Bylis and Korabi in Albania.

=== Hajduk Kula ===
Dukić played for Hajduk for three years. During this time he attracted the focus of Partizan and Red Star Belgrade. However, he remained at Hajduk.

=== Politehnica Timișoara ===
Dukić signed a contract with FC Timișoara in May 2010. He made his debut against MyPa where play forty-five minutes. He terminated his contract on 19 January 2011.

=== Second spell with Jagodina ===
During the winter break of the 2010–11 season, he returned to Serbia and signed with top-league side FK Jagodina.

=== Panargiakos ===
In summer 2017 he signed with Greek side Panargiakos.

=== Paraćin ===
In summer 2018 he returned to Serbia and played first one season with Borac Paraćin in Serbian League East and then moved to city rivals Jedinstvo Paraćin.

== Honours ==
Jagodina

- Serbian Cup: 2013
