= Sergei Avagimyan =

Armenian professional football player

Personal information
- Full name: Sergei Vladimirovich Avagimyan
- Date of birth: 5 July 1989 (age 37)
- Place of birth: Kaluga, Soviet Union
- Height: 1.82 m (6 ft 0 in)
- Position: Defender

Youth career
- Sirius DFK (Kaluga)

Senior career*
Years	Team	Apps	(Gls)
2009–2010	Nika Moscow	47	(1)
2011	Amur-2010 Blagoveshchensk	20	(0)
2012	Gandzasar Kapan	3	(0)
2012–2014	Spartak Kostroma	43	(0)
2014–2015	Baikal Irkutsk	46	(3)
2016	Ararat Yerevan	14	(0)
2017	Ararat-2 Moscow		
2017–2018	Ararat Moscow	8	(0)
2018–2021	Kaluga	61	(1)

International career
2016	Armenia	1	(0)
- * Club domestic league appearances and goals

Sergei Vladimirovich Avagimyan (Armenian: Սերգեյ Ավագիմյան; Russian: Серге́й Владимирович Авагимян; born 5 July 1989) is an Armenian former professional football player. Avagimyan was born in Russia to parents of Armenian descent.

== Career ==
=== Club ===
In January 2016, Avagimyan signed for Armenian Premier League side FC Ararat Yerevan. Avagimyan was told he could leave Ararat Yerevan in August 2016.

=== International ===
Avagimyan made his debut for the Armenia national football team in a 4–0 friendly win over El Salvador in 2016.

== Career statistics ==
=== International ===
Armenia national team
Year	Apps	Goals
2016	1	0
Total	1	0

Statistics accurate as of match played 1 June 2016
