= 2015–16 FC Banants season =

Banants
2015-16 season
- Manager: Aram Voskanyan (1 July - 11 October); Tito Ramallo (from 12 October)
- Stadium: Banants Stadium
- Premier League: 6th
- Armenian Cup: Champions vs Gandzasar Kapan
- Top goalscorer: League: Laércio (10); All: Laércio (15)

The 2015–16 season was Banants's 15th season in the Armenian Premier League. They finished the season sixth in the league, whilst they also won the Armenian Cup, earning entry in to the UEFA Europa League at the first qualifying stage.

== Season events ==
At the end of the season, Albert Ohanyan, Soslan Kalmanov, Andrey Shahgeldyan, Miguel López and Denis Mahmudov were all released by the club.

== Squad ==
As of match played 18 May 2016

No.	Name	Nationality	Position	Date of birth (age)	Signed from	Signed in	Contract ends	Apps.	Goals
Goalkeepers
1	Grigor Makaryan	(Armenia)	GK	19 April 1995 (aged 21)	Academy	2015			
22	Stepan Ghazaryan	(Armenia)	GK	11 January 1985 (aged 31)	Alashkert	2007			
Defenders
2	Aslan Kalmanov	(Russia)	DF	5 January 1994 (aged 22)	Ulisses	2016		7	0
3	Gevorg Khuloyan	(Armenia)	DF	18 August 1996 (aged 19)	Academy	2013			
6	Soslan Kachmazov	(Russia)	DF	14 July 1991 (aged 24)	Alania Vladikavkaz	2016		9	0
12	Soslan Kalmanov	(Russia)	DF	5 January 1994 (aged 22)	Ulisses	2016		6	0
15	Jasmin Mecinovikj	(North Macedonia)	DF	22 October 1990 (aged 25)	Renova	2016		12	0
19	Vlatko Drobarov	(North Macedonia)	DF	2 November 1992 (aged 23)	Teteks	2015		28	0
23	Narek Petrosyan	(Armenia)	DF	25 January 1996 (aged 20)	Academy	2015		7	0
55	Layonel Adams	(Russia)	DF	9 August 1994 (aged 21)	KAMAZ	2016		11	0
	Gagik Maghakyan	(Armenia)	DF	7 February 1996 (aged 20)	Academy	2013			
	Zhirayr Margaryan	(Armenia)	DF	13 September 1997 (aged 18)	Alashkert	2014		5	0
Midfielders
4	Alexander Hovhannisyan	(Armenia)	MF	20 July 1996 (aged 19)	Ulisses	2016		4	0
5	Hakob Hakobyan	(Armenia)	MF	29 March 1997 (aged 19)	Academy	2014			
7	Petros Avetisyan	(Armenia)	MF	7 January 1996 (aged 20)	Academy	2014		40	4
8	Walter Poghosyan	(Armenia)	MF	16 May 1992 (aged 24)	Academy	2008			
9	Emil Yeghiazaryan	(Armenia)	MF	3 November 1997 (aged 18)	Academy	2014		23	0
11	Nairi Minasyan	(Armenia)	MF	26 August 1995 (aged 20)	Academy	2011			
14	Claudio Torrejón	(Peru)	MF	14 May 1993 (aged 23)	Ulisses	2016		10	0
16	Miguel López	(Argentina)	MF	9 June 1988 (aged 27)	Tristán Suárez	2015		42	8
17	Zaven Badoyan	(Armenia)	MF	22 December 1989 (aged 26)	Pyunik	2015		13	5
18	Vahagn Ayvazyan	(Armenia)	MF	16 April 1992 (aged 24)	Impuls	2013			
21	Vladimir Babayan	(Armenia)	MF	6 May 1997 (aged 19)	Alashkert	2014		0	0
Forwards
10	Laércio	(Brazil)	FW	3 February 1990 (aged 26)	Metropolitano	2015		27	15
20	Denis Mahmudov	(North Macedonia)	FW	6 November 1989 (aged 26)	Levski Sofia	2016		9	0
24	Edgar Movsesyan	(Armenia)	FW	9 September 1998 (aged 17)	Academy	2014			
25	Tigran Ghazaryan	(Armenia)	FW	14 February 1997 (aged 19)	Academy	2013			
26	Magomed Muzaev	(Russia)	FW	24 January 1993 (aged 23)	Naftan Novopolotsk	2016		0	0
90	Atsamaz Burayev	(Russia)	FW	5 February 1990 (aged 26)	Gandzasar Kapan	2016		7	2
Players out on loan
Players who left during the season
1	Artur Toroyan	(Armenia)	GK	1 February 1992 (aged 24)	Academy	2012			
4	Aram Shakhnazaryan	(Armenia)	DF	21 April 1994 (aged 22)	Pyunik	2011			
6	Armen Manucharyan	(Armenia)	DF	3 February 1995 (aged 21)	Academy	2014		23	0
15	Bojan Mihajlović	(Bosnia and Herzegovina)	DF	15 September 1988 (aged 27)	Újpest	2015		16	1
17	John Jeremiah	(Nigeria)	FW	2 September 1993 (aged 22)	Pyunik	2011		8	4
20	Karen Harutyunyan	(Armenia)	DF	6 July 1995 (aged 20)	Academy	2011			
21	Andranik Kocharyan	(Armenia)	MF	29 January 1994 (aged 22)	Ulisses	2015			
24	Sarkis Baloyan	(Russia)	FW	24 August 1992 (aged 23)		2015		25	1
25	Vardan Movsisyan	(Armenia)	DF	18 August 1991 (aged 24)	Mika	2015		14	0

== Transfers ==
=== In ===
Date	Position	Nationality	Name	From	Fee	Ref.
Summer 2015	DF	(Bosnia and Herzegovina)	Bojan Mihajlović	Újpest	Undisclosed	
Summer 2015	DF	(North Macedonia)	Vlatko Drobarov	Teteks	Undisclosed	
Summer 2015	FW	(Brazil)	Laércio	Metropolitano	Undisclosed	
Winter 2016	DF	(North Macedonia)	Jasmin Mecinovikj	Renova	Undisclosed	
Winter 2016	DF	(Russia)	Layonel Adams	KAMAZ	Undisclosed	
Winter 2016	DF	(Russia)	Soslan Kachmazov	Ulisses	Undisclosed	
Winter 2016	DF	(Russia)	Aslan Kalmanov	Ulisses	Undisclosed	
Winter 2016	DF	(Russia)	Soslan Kalmanov	Ulisses	Undisclosed	
Winter 2016	MF	(Armenia)	Zaven Badoyan	Pyunik	Undisclosed	
Winter 2016	MF	(Armenia)	Alexander Hovhannisyan	Ulisses	Undisclosed	
Winter 2016	MF	(Peru)	Claudio Torrejón	Ulisses	Undisclosed	
Winter 2016	FW	(North Macedonia)	Denis Mahmudov	Levski Sofia	Undisclosed	
Winter 2016	FW	(Russia)	Atsamaz Burayev	Gandzasar Kapan	Undisclosed	
Winter 2016	FW	(Russia)	Magomed Muzayev	Naftan Novopolotsk	Undisclosed	

=== Released ===
Date	Position	Nationality	Name	Joined	Date	Ref.
31 August 2015	GK	(Armenia)	Artur Toroyan	Limoges	4 February 2016	
31 December 2015	FW	(Nigeria)	John Jeremiah	Rail Club du Kadiogo	1 July 2016	
31 December 2015	FW	(Russia)	Sarkis Baloyan	KK Shevchenko	1 January 2016	
11 January 2016	DF	(Armenia)	Karen Harutyunyan	Pyunik	11 January 2016	
11 January 2016	MF	(Armenia)	Armen Manucharyan	Pyunik	11 January 2016	
24 January 2016	DF	(Armenia)	Aram Shakhnazaryan	Ararat Yerevan	24 January 2016	
1 February 2016	MF	(Armenia)	Andranik Kocharyan	Mika	1 February 2016	
5 February 2016	DF	(Armenia)	Vardan Movsisyan	Mika	5 February 2016	
15 March 2016	DF	(Bosnia and Herzegovina)	Bojan Mihajlović	Isloch Minsk Raion	15 March 2016	
26 May 2016	GK	(Armenia)	Albert Ohanyan	Erebuni		
26 May 2016	DF	(Russia)	Soslan Kalmanov			
26 May 2016	MF	(Argentina)	Miguel López	Racing de Olavarría		
26 May 2016	MF	(Armenia)	Andrey Shahgeldyan			
26 May 2016	FW	(North Macedonia)	Denis Mahmudov	Telstar		

== Competitions ==
=== Overall record ===
Competition	First match	Last match	Starting round	Final position	Record							
Competition	First match	Last match	Starting round	Final position	Pld	W	D	L	GF	GA	GD	Win %
Premier League	1 August 2015	18 May 2016	Matchday 1	6th	28	7	12	9	36	34	+2	25.00
Armenian Cup	28 October 2015	4 May 2016	Quarterfinal	Winners	5	3	0	2	8	4	+4	60.00
Total					33	10	12	11	44	38	+6	30.30

Last updated: 18 May 2016
Source: Competitions

=== Premier League ===
==== Results summary ====
Overall								Home						Away					
Pld	W	D	L	GF	GA	GD	Pts	W	D	L	GF	GA	GD	W	D	L	GF	GA	GD
28	7	12	9	36	34	+2	33	4	7	3	22	13	+9	3	5	6	14	21	−7

Last updated: 18 May 2016.
Source: See Results

==== Results ====
1 August 2015 1	Banants	1 – 1	Mika	Yerevan
18:00 (UTC+4)	K.Harutyunyan (yellow card) 41'; A.Shakhnazaryan (yellow card) 83'; J.Jeremiah 90+2'	Report	A.Belomitsev (yellow card) 50'; Toboyev 75' (yellow card) 90+1'	Stadium: Banants Stadium; Attendance: 500; Referee: Artur Simonyan

8 August 2015 2	Pyunik	5 – 1	Banants	Yerevan
19:00 (UTC+4)	V.Satumyan 22', 47'; S.Shahinyan (yellow card) 39'; K.Hovhannisyan 43'; V.Poghosyan 56' (yellow card) 67'; T.Voskanyan (yellow card) 75'; Yuspashyan 85'	Report	Laércio 39' (pen.) (yellow card) 81'	Stadium: Yerevan Football Academy Stadium; Attendance: 400; Referee: Artur Simonyan

16 August 2015 3	Banants	2 – 2	Alashkert	Yerevan
19:00 (UTC+4)	K.Harutyunyan (yellow card) 10'; Jeremiah 16', 50'; A.Shakhnazaryan (yellow card) 59'	Report	Dukić 8'; S.Fofana (yellow card) 43'; M.Manasyan 62' (yellow card) 86'	Stadium: Banants Stadium; Attendance: 200; Referee: Zaven Hovhannisyan

23 August 2015 4	Banants	3 – 0	Ararat Yerevan	Yerevan
17:00 (UTC+4)	Jeremiah 2'; López 23' (yellow card) 49'; Harutyunyan (yellow card) 44'; Minasyan 70'; Manucharyan (yellow card) 89'	Report	Martirosyan (yellow card) 45'	Stadium: Banants Stadium; Attendance: 600; Referee: Suren Baliyan

29 August 2015 5	Shirak	1 – 1	Banants	Gyumri
17:30 (UTC+4)	K.Kouakou 33'; A.Barikyan (yellow card) 90'	Report	J.Jeremiah (yellow card) 32'; Laércio 89' (pen.)	Stadium: Gyumri City Stadium; Attendance: 500; Referee: Edgar Sahakyan

13 September 2015 6	Banants	0 – 1	Gandzasar Kapan	Yerevan
17:00 (UTC+4)		Report	Beglaryan 34'; Barseghyan (yellow card) 38'; Arm.Petrosyan (yellow card) 56'	Stadium: Banants Stadium; Attendance: 500; Referee: Zaven Hovhannisyan

19 September 2015 7	Ulisses	2 – 2	Banants	Yerevan
17:30 (UTC+4)	Zagrè (yellow card) 27'; Yushin 49'; B.Chimakadze 90'	Report	Avetisyan 90+1'; López 90+3'	Stadium: Vazgen Sargsyan Republican Stadium; Attendance: 100; Referee: Artur Safaryan

27 September 2015 8	Mika	1 – 0	Banants	Yerevan
16:00 (UTC+4)	Talalay 28'; Beglaryan (yellow card) 59'; A.Karapetyan (yellow card) 68'; Chistyakov (yellow card) 70'; Zaripov (yellow card) 90+3'	Report	V.Ayvazyan (red card) 62'; Mihajlović (yellow card) 70'	Stadium: Mika Stadium; Attendance: 250; Referee: Artur Safaryan

3 October 2015 9	Banants	0 – 1	Pyunik	Yerevan
15:00 (UTC+4)	Drobarov (yellow card) 24'; A.Shakhnazaryan (yellow card) 69'; G.Maghaqyan (yellow card) 85'; Manucharyan (yellow card) 90+4'	Report	Hayrapetyan 70' (pen.) (yellow card) 75'; Haroyan (yellow card) 71'	Stadium: Banants Stadium; Attendance: 1,000; Referee: Artur Safaryan

18 October 2015 10	Alashkert	3 – 0	Banants	Yerevan
14:00 (UTC+4)	Héber 19', 76'; Arakelyan (yellow card) 56'; Balabekyan (yellow card) 59'; M.Manasyan 68' (pen.)	Report	K.Harutyunyan (yellow card) 35'; A.Shakhnazaryan (red card) 67'	Stadium: Alashkert Stadium; Attendance: 700; Referee: Zaven Hovhannisyan

24 October 2015 11	Ararat Yerevan	0 – 0	Banants	Yerevan
14:00 (UTC+4)		Report		Stadium: Hrazdan Stadium; Attendance: 150; Referee: Arman Alaberkyan

31 October 2015 12	Banants	1 – 1	Shirak	Yerevan
15:00 (UTC+4)	V.Ayvazyan (yellow card) 60'; Laércio 64'; Z.Margaryan (yellow card) 90+2'	Report	A.Barikyan (yellow card) 10'; K.Kouakou 26'	Stadium: Banants Stadium; Attendance: 400; Referee: Arman Alaberkyan

7 November 2015 13	Banants	1 – 1	Gandzasar Kapan	Yerevan
15:00 (UTC+4)	Laércio 38' (yellow card) 78'; H. Hakobyan (yellow card) 90+3'	Report	Gogatishvili 30'; A.Hambartsumyan (yellow card) 60'; Wbeymar (yellow card) 68'	Stadium: Banants Stadium; Attendance: 2,500; Referee: Zaven Hovhannisyan

21 November 2015 14	Banants	5 – 1	Ulisses	Yerevan
15:30 (UTC+4)	Laércio 10', 67', 90'; López (yellow card) 47'; V.Ayvazyan 65'; Mihajlović 73'	Report	G.Movsisyan 41'; K.Avetisyan (yellow card) 47'	Stadium: Banants Stadium; Attendance: 1,500; Referee: Arman Alaberkyan

29 November 2015 15	Banants	1 – 1	Mika	Yerevan
15:00 (UTC+4)	V.Ayvazyan 9'; López (yellow card) 34'; Laércio (yellow card) 42'; Manucharyan (yellow card) 84'	Report	Melkonyan 18'; Talalay (yellow card) 26'; Toboyev (yellow card) 38'; A.Belomyttsev (yellow card) 52'; Kvekveskiri (yellow card) 67'	Stadium: Banants Stadium; Attendance: 500; Referee: Artur Simonyan

2 March 2016 16	Pyunik	1 – 2	Banants	Yerevan
14:00 (UTC+4)	Gh.Poghosyan 6' (yellow card) 28'	Report	Drobarov (yellow card) 53'; Laércio 45'; Badoyan 69'; Burayev (yellow card) 71'	Stadium: Vazgen Sargsyan Republican Stadium; Attendance: 300; Referee: Zaven Hovhannisyan

12 March 2016 17	Banants	2 – 0	Alashkert	Yerevan
14:00 (UTC+4)	Badoyan 70'; Avetisyan 72'; Mecinović (yellow card) 78'	Report	Ge.Poghosyan (yellow card) 24'; Arta.Yedigaryan (yellow card) 56'; Artu.Yedigaryan (yellow card) 69'	Stadium: Banants Stadium; Attendance: 400; Referee: Artur Simonyan

20 March 2016 18	Banants	2 – 2	Ararat Yerevan	Yerevan
14:00 (UTC+4)	Laércio 19'; Badoyan 21'; H. Hakobyan (yellow card) 61'	Report	M.Orozco 9' (pen.); Avagimyan (yellow card) 29' de la Fuente 48'; O.Kaina (yellow card) 78'; V.Martirosyan (yellow card) 87'	Stadium: Banants Stadium; Attendance: 700; Referee: Artur Safaryan

6 April 2016 19	Shirak	3 – 1	Banants	Gyumri
16:00 (UTC+4)	K.Kouakou 34'; Darbinyan (yellow card) 41'; Stošković 45'; Stamenković (yellow card) 81'; V.Ayvazyan 90'	Report	V.Ayvazyan (yellow card) 41' (yellow-red card) 70'; P.Avetisyan 49'; Badoyan (yellow card) 59'	Stadium: Gyumri City Stadium; Attendance: 600; Referee: Suren Baliyan

3 April 2016 20	Gandzasar Kapan	2 – 1	Banants	Kapan
14:00 (UTC+4)	Barseghyan (yellow card) 15' (yellow-red card) 89'; Memović (yellow card) 27'; Beglaryan 40'; A.Khachatryan (yellow card) 53'; G.Harutyunyan 90+1' (yellow card) 90+1'	Report	Adams (yellow card) 39'; P.Avetisyan (yellow card) 63'	Stadium: Gandzasar Stadium; Attendance: 600; Referee: Suren Baliyan

9 April 2016 21	Ulisses	0 – 3	Banants	Yerevan
19:00 (UTC+4)		Report		Stadium: Vazgen Sargsyan Republican Stadium
Note: Match cancelled and awarded to Pyunik after Ulisses were expelled from the league in February 2016.

17 April 2016 22	Mika	0 – 0	Banants	Yerevan
16:00 (UTC+4)	Dmitry Lushnikov (yellow card) 43'; V.Movsisyan (yellow card) 73'	Report	Avetisyan (yellow card) 74'	Stadium: Mika Stadium; Attendance: 200; Referee: Artur Simonyan

23 April 2016 23	Banants	1 – 1	Pyunik	Yerevan
17:00 (UTC+4)	Kalmanov (yellow card) 48'; López (yellow card) 85'; Badoyan 87'; Laércio (yellow card) 90'	Report	E.Petrosyan 68'; Grigoryan (yellow card) 90'	Stadium: Banants Stadium; Attendance: 600; Referee: Zaven Hovhannisyan

30 April 2016 24	Alashkert	2 – 1	Banants	Yerevan
17:00 (UTC+4)	Héber 16'; Grigoryan (yellow card) 38'; Muradyan 78'	Report	V.Ayvazyan 57'; N.Petrosyan (yellow card) 66'; Burayev (yellow card) 68'	Stadium: Alashkert Stadium; Attendance: 400; Referee: Gevorg Eghoyan

8 May 2016 25	Ararat Yerevan	1 – 2	Banants	Yerevan
19:00 (UTC+4)	O.Kaina (yellow card) 32'; Nwabueze 50'	Report	O.Oganisyan (yellow card) 28'; N.Minasyan 42'; Burayev 85'; Laércio (yellow card) 88'	Stadium: Hrazdan Stadium; Attendance: 200; Referee: Artur Safaryan

14 May 2016 26	Banants	0 – 1	Shirak	Yerevan
17:00 (UTC+4)	V.Drobarov (yellow card) 30'; Laércio (yellow card) 51'; Kachmazov (yellow card) 57' (yellow-red card) 58'; Torrejón (yellow card) 87'	Report	O.Oganisyan 24' (o.g.); Stošković (yellow card) 31'; Aleksanyan (yellow card) 54'; Arreola (yellow card) 74'; Darbinyan (yellow card) 85'; A.Khachatryan (yellow card) 88'	Stadium: Banants Stadium; Attendance: 1,000; Referee: Artur Simonyan

22 May 2016 27	Gandzasar Kapan	0 – 0	Banants	Kapan
17:00 (UTC+4)	A.Durunts (yellow card) 70'	Report	Adams (yellow card) 34' (yellow-red card) 79'; P.Avetisyan (yellow card) 63'	Stadium: Gandzasar Stadium; Attendance: 900; Referee: Zaven Hovhannisyan

18 May 2016 28	Banants	3 – 0	Ulisses	Yerevan
17:00 (UTC+4)		Report		Stadium: Banants Stadium
Note: Match cancelled and awarded to Pyunik after Ulisses were expelled from the league in February 2016.

==== Table ====
Pos	Team	Pld	W	D	L	GF	GA	GD	Pts	Qualification or relegation
4	Gandzasar Kapan	28	11	12	5	35	27	+8	45	
5	Ararat Yerevan	28	9	10	9	28	31	−3	37	
6	Banants	28	7	12	9	36	34	+2	33	Qualification for the Europa League first qualifying round (Note: Banants qualified for the Europa League first qualifying round by winning the 2015–16 Armenian Cup.)
7	Mika	28	9	5	14	30	32	−2	32	
8	Ulisses (D)	28	0	2	26	8	76	−68	2	Expelled (Note: In February 2016, Ulisses were expelled from the league after their licence was revoked due to both financial and non-financial shortcomings. Since more than half of the matches had been played at the time, the matches scheduled to take place after the licence was revoked were decided as 3–0 losses.)

Source: Football Federation of Armenia, Soccerway
Rules for classification: 1) Points; 2) Play-off (only if deciding champion); 3) Matches won; 4) Head-to-head points; 5) Head-to-head matches won; 6) Head-to-head goal difference; 7) Head-to-head goals scored; 8) Head-to-head away goals scored; 9) Goal difference; 10) Goals scored.
(D) Disqualified

=== Armenian Cup ===
28 October 2015 Quarterfinal 1st leg	Ulisses	0 – 3	Banants	Yerevan
14:00 (UTC+4)	D.Berisha (yellow card) 51'; T.Kandikijan (yellow card) 69'; Kalmanov (yellow card) 74'	Report	H. Hakobyan (yellow card) 40'; Poghosyan (yellow card) 51'; Laércio 69' (pen.), 77'; Baloyan 90'	Stadium: Vazgen Sargsyan Republican Stadium; Attendance: 200; Referee: Artur Safaryan

25 November 2015 Quarterfinal 2nd leg	Banants	1 – 2 (4 – 2 agg.)	Ulisses	Yerevan
14:00 (UTC+4)	Laércio 19'; N.Minasyan (yellow card) 32'; Mihajlović (yellow card) 48'; H. Hakobyan (yellow card) 58'	Report	V.Avetisyan 31'; A.Tutyan 37'; M.Araratyan (yellow card) 90+3'	Stadium: Banants Stadium; Attendance: 200; Referee: Artur Safaryan

15 March 2016 Semifinal 1st leg	Banants	0 – 1	Alashkert	Yerevan
14:00 (UTC+4)	Drobarov (yellow card) 30'; Torrejón (red card) 77'	Report	Voskanyan (yellow card) 30'; M.Manasyan (yellow card) 31'; Héber 45'; Arakelyan (yellow card) 57'; K.Veranyan (red card) 77'; Ga.Poghosyan (red card) 85'	Stadium: Banants Stadium; Attendance: 600; Referee: Suren Baliyan

12 April 2016 Semifinal 2nd leg	Alashkert	1 – 2 (2 – 2 agg.)	Banants	Yerevan
15:00 (UTC+4)	Arta.Yedigaryan (yellow card) 54'; Héber (yellow card) 78'; Artu.Yedigaryan (yellow card) 80'; Voskanyan 90+5'	Report	Badoyan 14'; H. Hakobyan (yellow card) 31'; Mecinović (yellow card) 65'; Laércio 75' (yellow card) 79'; Kachmazov (yellow card) 80'; López (yellow card) 90+6'	Stadium: Alashkert Stadium; Attendance: 500; Referee: Zaven Hovhannisyan

==== Final ====
4 May 2016	Banants	2 – 0	Mika	Yerevan
19:00 (UTC+4)	Laércio 3' (pen.); Drobarov (yellow card) 31'; Burayev 38'; Torrejón (yellow card) 57'; Ghazaryan (yellow card) 69'; López (yellow card) 70'; Mecinović (yellow card) 88'	Report	Chistyakov (yellow card) 2'; Shumilin (yellow card) 40'; A.Kpenia (yellow card) 45'; Dmitry Lushnikov (yellow card) 57'; Kovačević (yellow card) 65'; Chakhvashvili (yellow card) 81'	Stadium: Vazgen Sargsyan Republican Stadium; Attendance: 3,000; Referee: Suren Baliyan

== Statistics ==
As of match played 18 May 2016

=== Appearances and goals ===
No.	Pos	Nat	Player	Total		Premier League		Armenian Cup	
No.	Pos	Nat	Player	Apps	Goals	Apps	Goals	Apps	Goals
1	GK	(Armenia) ARM	Grigor Makaryan	1	0	1	0	0	0
2	DF	(Russia) RUS	Aslan Kalmanov	7	0	4+1	0	1+1	0
3	DF	(Armenia) ARM	Gevorg Khuloyan	3	0	2+1	0	0	0
4	MF	(Armenia) ARM	Aleksandr Hovhannisyan	4	0	4	0	0	0
5	MF	(Armenia) ARM	Hakob Hakobyan	20	0	12+3	0	5	0
6	DF	(Russia) RUS	Soslan Kachmazov	9	0	6	0	3	0
7	MF	(Armenia) ARM	Petros Avetisyan	26	3	15+7	3	1+3	0
8	MF	(Armenia) ARM	Walter Poghosyan	16	0	8+5	0	2+1	0
9	MF	(Armenia) ARM	Emil Yeghiazaryan	16	0	0+14	0	2	0
10	FW	(Brazil) BRA	Laércio	27	15	21+1	10	4+1	5
11	MF	(Armenia) ARM	Nairi Minasyan	27	0	22+2	0	2+1	0
12	DF	(Russia) RUS	Soslan Kalmanov	6	0	4+2	0	0	0
14	MF	(Peru) PER	Claudio Torrejón	10	0	6+1	0	3	0
15	DF	(North Macedonia) MKD	Jasmin Mecinović	12	0	7+2	0	2+1	0
16	MF	(Argentina) ARG	Miguel Pedro López	28	2	21+2	2	4+1	0
17	MF	(Armenia) ARM	Zaven Badoyan	13	5	9+1	4	3	1
18	MF	(Armenia) ARM	Vahagn Ayvazyan	25	3	14+7	3	3+1	0
19	DF	(North Macedonia) MKD	Vlatko Drobarov	28	0	23	0	5	0
20	FW	(North Macedonia) MKD	Denis Mahmudov	9	0	3+4	0	0+2	0
21	MF	(Armenia) ARM	Vladimir Babayan	1	0	0+1	0	0	0
22	GK	(Armenia) ARM	Stepan Ghazaryan	27	0	22	0	5	0
23	DF	(Armenia) ARM	Narek Petrosyan	7	0	4+2	0	1	0
24	FW	(Armenia) ARM	Edgar Movsesyan	12	0	0+10	0	0+2	0
25	FW	(Armenia) ARM	Tigran Ghazaryan	1	0	0+1	0	0	0
55	DF	(Russia) RUS	Layonel Adams	11	0	8	0	3	0
90	FW	(Russia) RUS	Atsamaz Burayev	7	2	5+1	1	1	1
	DF	(Armenia) ARM	Gagik Maghakyan	1	0	1	0	0	0
	DF	(Armenia) ARM	Zhirayr Margaryan	1	0	0+1	0	0	0
Players away on loan:
Players who left Banants during the season:
1	GK	(Armenia) ARM	Artur Toroyan	3	0	3	0	0	0
4	DF	(Armenia) ARM	Aram Shakhnazaryan	8	0	8	0	0	0
6	DF	(Armenia) ARM	Armen Manucharyan	13	0	9+3	0	1	0
15	DF	(Bosnia and Herzegovina) BIH	Bojan Mihajlović	16	1	13+1	1	2	0
17	FW	(Nigeria) NGR	John Jeremiah	8	4	4+4	4	0	0
20	DF	(Armenia) ARM	Karen Harutyunyan	10	0	7+3	0	0	0
21	MF	(Armenia) ARM	Andranik Kocharyan	3	0	1+1	0	1	0
24	FW	(Russia) RUS	Sarkis Baloyan	12	0	8+3	0	0+1	0
25	DF	(Armenia) ARM	Vardan Movsisyan	14	0	10+2	0	1+1	0

=== Goal scorers ===
Place	Position	Nation	Number	Name	Premier League	Armenian Cup	Total
1	FW	(Brazil)	10	Laércio	10	5	15
2	MF	(Armenia)	17	Zaven Badoyan	4	1	5
3	FW	(Nigeria)	17	John Jeremiah	4	0	4
4	MF	(Armenia)	18	Vahagn Ayvazyan	3	0	3
4	MF	(Armenia)	7	Petros Avetisyan	3	0	3
6	MF	(Argentina)	16	Miguel Pedro López	2	0	2
6	MF	(Armenia)	11	Nairi Minasyan	2	0	2
6	FW	(Russia)	90	Atsamaz Burayev	1	1	2
9	DF	(Bosnia and Herzegovina)	15	Bojan Mihajlović	1	0	1
9	FW	(Russia)	24	Sarkis Baloyan	0	1	1
				Awarded	6	0	6
				TOTALS	36	8	44

=== Clean sheets ===
Place	Position	Nation	Number	Name	Premier League	Armenian Cup	Total
1	GK	(Armenia)	22	Stepan Ghazaryan	5	2	7
2	GK	(Armenia)	1	Artur Torosyan	1	0	1
				TOTALS	6	2	8

=== Disciplinary record ===
Number	Nation	Position	Name	Premier League		Armenian Cup		Total	
Number	Nation	Position	Name	Yellow card	Red card	Yellow card	Red card	Yellow card	Red card
2	(Russia)	DF	Aslan Kalmanov	1	0	0	0	1	0
3	(Armenia)	DF	Narek Petrosyan	1	0	0	0	1	0
4	(Armenia)	MF	Aleksandr Hovhannisyan	1	0	0	0	1	0
5	(Armenia)	MF	Hakob Hakobyan	3	0	3	0	6	0
6	(Russia)	DF	Soslan Kachmazov	2	1	1	0	3	1
7	(Armenia)	MF	Petros Avetisyan	2	0	0	0	2	0
8	(Armenia)	MF	Walter Poghosyan	0	0	1	0	1	0
10	(Brazil)	FW	Laércio	6	0	1	0	7	0
11	(Armenia)	MF	Nairi Minasyan	0	0	1	0	1	0
14	(Peru)	MF	Claudio Torrejón	1	0	1	1	2	1
15	(North Macedonia)	DF	Jasmin Mecinović	1	0	2	0	3	0
16	(Argentina)	MF	Miguel Pedro López	4	0	2	0	6	0
17	(Armenia)	MF	Zaven Badoyan	1	0	0	0	1	0
18	(Armenia)	MF	Vahagn Ayvazyan	3	2	0	0	3	2
19	(North Macedonia)	DF	Vlatko Drobarov	3	0	2	0	5	0
22	(Armenia)	GK	Stepan Ghazaryan	0	0	1	0	1	0
55	(Russia)	DF	Layonel Adams	3	1	0	0	3	1
90	(Russia)	FW	Atsamaz Burayev	1	0	0	0	1	0
	(Armenia)	DF	Gagik Maghakyan	1	0	0	0	1	0
	(Armenia)	DF	Zhirayr Margaryan	1	0	0	0	1	0
Players who left Banants during the season:
4	(Armenia)	DF	Aram Shakhnazaryan	3	1	0	0	3	1
6	(Armenia)	DF	Armen Manucharyan	3	0	0	0	3	0
15	(Bosnia and Herzegovina)	DF	Bojan Mihajlović	1	0	1	0	2	0
17	(Nigeria)	FW	John Jeremiah	1	0	0	0	1	0
20	(Armenia)	DF	Karen Harutyunyan	4	0	0	0	4	0
			TOTALS	47	5	16	1	63	6
