= 2016–17 FC Banants season =

Banants
2016–17 season
- Chairman: Karlen Mkrtchyan
- Manager: Tito Ramallo
- Stadium: Banants Stadium
- Premier League: 5th
- Armenian Cup: Semifinal vs Pyunik
- UEFA Europa League: First qualifying round vs Omonia
- Top goalscorer: League: Laércio (3); All: Two Players (3)
Home colours	Away colours

The 2016–17 season was FC Banants's sixteenth consecutive season in the Armenian Premier League. The club finished the previous season in 5th and reached the Semifinal of the Armenian Cup.

== Squad ==
As of match played 31 May 2017

No.	Name	Nationality	Position	Date of birth (Age)	Signed from	Signed in	Contract ends	Apps.	Goals
Goalkeepers
1	Grigor Makaryan	(Armenia)	GK	19 April 1995 (aged 22)	Academy	2015			
22	Stepan Ghazaryan	(Armenia)	GK	11 January 1985 (aged 32)	Alashkert	2007			
70	Aram Ayrapetyan	(Russia)	GK	22 November 1986 (aged 30)	Ararat Yerevan	2017		11	0
91	Henri Avagyan	(Armenia)	GK	16 January 1996 (aged 21)	Mika	2016		4	0
Defenders
2	Hakob Hambardzumyan	(Armenia)	DF	26 May 1997 (aged 20)	Academy	2016		18	0
3	Gevorg Khuloyan	(Armenia)	DF	18 August 1996 (aged 20)	Academy	2013			
15	Aghavard Petrosyan	(Armenia)	DF	16 April 1997 (aged 20)	Academy	2016		2	0
19	Vlatko Drobarov	(North Macedonia)	DF	2 November 1992 (aged 24)	Teteks	2015		63	1
21	Artur Avagyan	(Armenia)	DF	4 July 1987 (aged 29)	Alashkert	2016		18	0
23	Narek Petrosyan	(Armenia)	DF	25 January 1996 (aged 21)	Academy	2015		24	0
26	Zhirayr Margaryan	(Armenia)	DF	13 September 1997 (aged 19)	Alashkert	2014		10	0
55	Layonel Adams	(Russia)	DF	9 August 1994 (aged 22)	KAMAZ	2016		34	0
	Gagik Maghakyan	(Armenia)	DF	7 February 1996 (aged 21)	Academy	2016		2	0
	Hayk Sargsyan	(Armenia)	DF	12 March 1998 (aged 19)	Academy	2016		1	0
Midfielders
4	Alexander Hovhannisyan	(Armenia)	MF	20 July 1996 (aged 20)	Ulisses	2016		15	1
5	Hakob Hakobyan	(Armenia)	MF	29 March 1997 (aged 20)	Academy	2014			
7	Aram Bareghamyan	(Armenia)	MF	6 January 1988 (aged 29)	Alashkert	2016			
8	Walter Poghosyan	(Armenia)	MF	16 May 1992 (aged 25)	Academy	2008			
9	Aram Kocharyan	(Armenia)	MF	5 March 1996 (aged 21)	Academy	2016		8	1
11	Nairi Minasyan	(Armenia)	MF	26 August 1995 (aged 21)	Academy	2011			
14	Emil Yeghiazaryan	(Armenia)	MF	3 November 1997 (aged 19)	Academy	2014		37	2
18	Vahagn Ayvazyan	(Armenia)	MF	16 April 1992 (aged 25)	Impuls	2013			
20	Karen Harutyunyan	(Armenia)	MF	6 July 1995 (aged 21)	Terengganu	2017			
77	Aram Loretsyan	(Armenia)	MF	7 March 1993 (aged 24)	Ararat Yerevan	2017			
	Ashot Adamyan	(Armenia)	MF	15 June 1997 (aged 19)	Mika	2016		2	0
	Aram Khamoyan	(Armenia)	MF	10 January 2000 (aged 17)	Academy	2016		6	0
	Karen Melkonyan	(Armenia)	MF	16 May 1992 (aged 25)	Academy	2016		7	0
	Vardan Safaryan	(Armenia)	MF	22 April 1997 (aged 20)	Mika	2016		1	0
	Erik Vardanyan	(Armenia)	MF	8 March 1999 (aged 18)	Mika	2016		3	0
Forwards
6	Orbeli Hambardzumyan	(Armenia)	FW	26 March 1996 (aged 21)	Ulisses	2016			
10	Norayr Gyozalyan	(Armenia)	FW	15 March 1990 (aged 27)	Alashkert	2017			
12	Nenad Injac	(Serbia)	FW	4 September 1985 (aged 31)	Zemun	2017		12	3
13	Hayk Voskanyan	(Armenia)	FW	23 June 1996 (aged 20)	Mika	2011		9	0
16	Grigor Aghekyan	(Armenia)	FW	6 April 1996 (aged 21)	Academy	2016		13	1
17	Hovhannes Ilangyozyan	(Armenia)	FW	14 January 1997 (aged 20)	Academy	2014			
24	Edgar Movsesyan	(Armenia)	FW	9 September 1998 (aged 18)	Academy	2014			
	Martin Grigoryan	(Armenia)	FW	25 September 2000 (aged 16)	Academy	2016		4	0
Players out on loan
Players who left during the season
2	Aslan Kalmanov	(Russia)	DF	5 January 1994 (aged 23)	Ulisses	2016		13	0
6	Soslan Kachmazov	(Russia)	DF	14 July 1991 (aged 25)	Alania Vladikavkaz	2016		19	0
7	Petros Avetisyan	(Armenia)	MF	7 January 1996 (aged 21)	Academy	2014		42	4
9	Vardges Satumyan	(Armenia)	MF	7 February 1990 (aged 27)	Academy	2016		14	1
10	Laércio	(Brazil)	FW	3 February 1990 (aged 27)	Metropolitano	2015		44	18
14	Claudio Torrejón	(Peru)	MF	14 May 1993 (aged 24)	Ulisses	2016		30	0
15	Jasmin Mecinovikj	(North Macedonia)	DF	22 October 1990 (aged 26)	Renova	2016		13	0
17	Zaven Badoyan	(Armenia)	MF	22 December 1989 (aged 27)	Pyunik	2015		27	7
90	Atsamaz Burayev	(Russia)	FW	5 February 1990 (aged 27)	Gandzasar Kapan	2016		22	3

== Transfers ==
=== In ===
Date	Position	Nationality	Name	From	Fee	Ref.
26 July 2016	GK	(Armenia)	Henri Avagyan	Mika	Undisclosed	
26 July 2016	DF	(Armenia)	Artur Avagyan	Alashkert	Undisclosed	
26 July 2016	MF	(Armenia)	Vardges Satumyan	Pyunik	Undisclosed	
26 July 2016	FW	(Armenia)	Hayk Voskanyan	Mika	Undisclosed	
2 August 2016	MF	(Armenia)	Aram Bareghamyan	Alashkert	Undisclosed	
1 January 2017	MF	(Armenia)	Karen Harutyunyan	Terengganu	Undisclosed	
1 January 2017	MF	(Armenia)	Aram Loretsyan	Ararat Yerevan	Undisclosed	
1 January 2017	FW	(Armenia)	Norayr Gyozalyan	Alashkert	Undisclosed	
13 February 2017	GK	(Russia)	Aram Ayrapetyan	Ararat Yerevan	Undisclosed	
24 February 2017	FW	(Serbia)	Nenad Injac	Zemun	Undisclosed	

=== Out ===
Date	Position	Nationality	Name	To	Fee	Ref.
13 January 2017	FW	(Brazil)	Laércio	Prachuap	Undisclosed	
20 January 2017	MF	(Peru)	Claudio Torrejón	Fénix	Undisclosed	
31 January 2017	MF	(Armenia)	Petros Avetisyan	Pyunik	Undisclosed	
28 February 2017	FW	(Armenia)	Atsamaz Burayev	Alashkert	Undisclosed	

=== Loans out ===
Date from	Position	Nationality	Name	To	Date to	Ref.
29 July 2016	MF	(Armenia)	Petros Avetisyan	Pyunik	31 January 2017	

=== Released ===
Date	Position	Nationality	Name	Joined	Date
31 July 2016	FW	(Russia)	Magomed Muzayev		
8 October 2016	DF	(Russia)	Aslan Kalmanov		
31 December 2016	DF	(North Macedonia)	Jasmin Mecinovikj	Pelister	1 January 2017
31 December 2016	DF	(Russia)	Soslan Kachmazov	Kuban-Holding Pavlovskaya	1 January 2017
31 December 2016	MF	(Armenia)	Zaven Badoyan	Gomel	1 January 2017
30 January 2017	MF	(Armenia)	Vardges Satumyan	Retired	
30 June 2017	GK	(Armenia)	Grigor Makaryan	Artsakh	1 July 2017
30 June 2017	DF	(North Macedonia)	Vlatko Drobarov	Aris Limassol	8 July 2017
30 June 2017	DF	(Russia)	Layonel Adams	Cerceda	1 September 2017
30 June 2017	MF	(Armenia)	Walter Poghosyan	Gandzasar Kapan	19 July 2017
30 June 2017	MF	(Armenia)	Karen Harutyunyan	Artsakh	12 July 2017
30 June 2017	MF	(Armenia)	Hovhannes Ilangyozyan	Pyunik	1 August 2017
30 June 2017	MF	(Armenia)	Nairi Minasyan	Alashkert	2 August 2017
30 June 2017	MF	(Armenia)	Edgar Movsisyan	Foresta Suceava	1 September 2017
30 June 2017	FW	(Armenia)	Grigor Aghekyan	Artsakh	1 July 2017

== Competitions ==
=== Overall record ===
Competition	First match	Last match	Starting round	Final position	Record							
Competition	First match	Last match	Starting round	Final position	Pld	W	D	L	GF	GA	GD	Win %
Premier League	6 August 2016	31 May 2017	Matchday 1	5th	30	5	6	19	18	44	−26	16.67
Armenian Cup	21 September 2016	25 April 2017	Quarterfinal	Semifinal	4	1	0	3	3	5	−2	25.00
UEFA Europa League	30 June 2016	7 July 2016	First qualifying round	First qualifying round	2	0	0	2	1	5	−4	0.00
Total					36	6	6	24	22	54	−32	16.67

Last updated: 31 May 2017
Source: Competitions

=== Premier League ===
==== Results summary ====
Overall								Home						Away					
Pld	W	D	L	GF	GA	GD	Pts	W	D	L	GF	GA	GD	W	D	L	GF	GA	GD
30	5	6	19	18	44	−26	21	3	3	9	10	21	−11	2	3	10	8	23	−15

==== Results ====
6 August 2016 1	Banants	1 – 0	Ararat Yerevan	Yerevan
18:00 (UTC+4)	A.Bareghamyan (yellow card) 23'; Laércio 57'	Report	Avagimyan (yellow card) 25'; G.Khachatryan (yellow card) 28'; Nwabueze (yellow card) 80'	Stadium: Banants Stadium; Attendance: 700; Referee: Gevorg Eghoyan

14 August 2016 2	Banants	0 – 1	Shirak	Yerevan
18:00 (UTC+4)	A.Bareghamyan (yellow card) 34'	Report	Shults (yellow card) 15'; D.Hakobyan 90'; Udo (yellow card) 90'	Stadium: Banants Stadium; Referee: Zaven Hovhannisyan

21 August 2016 3	Alashkert	3 – 0	Banants	Yerevan
17:00 (UTC+4)	Daghbashyan (yellow card) 34'; Dashyan 47'; Kvekveskiri (yellow card) 68'; Artu.Yedigaryan 76'; Fomenko 83'	Report	Laércio (yellow card) 49'	Stadium: Alashkert Stadium; Attendance: 500; Referee: Artur Safaryan

28 August 2016 4	Banants	4 – 1	Gandzasar Kapan	Yerevan
17:00 (UTC+4)	Badoyan 5'; Laércio (yellow card) 8' (goal) 61' (pen.); V.Satumyan 24'; Burayev 67'; Ghazaryan (yellow card) 72'	Report	A.Karapetyan (yellow card) 4'; Ale.Petrosyan (red card) 58'; Musonda 10'; G.Harutyunyan (yellow card) 71'; Claudir (yellow card) 85'	Stadium: Banants Stadium; Attendance: 500; Referee: Gevorg Eghoyan

11 September 2016 5	Pyunik	2 – 1	Banants	Yerevan
19:00 (UTC+4)	V.Pogosyan 31'; A.Arakelyan (yellow card) 45'; A.Manucharyan (yellow card) 48'; A.Shakhnazaryan (yellow card) 59'; E.Petrosyan 90+1'	Report	Torrejón (yellow card) 56'; Burayev (yellow card) 59'; H. Hakobyan (yellow card) 67'; Drobarov 69'; Laércio (yellow card) 77'	Stadium: Yerevan Football Academy Stadium; Attendance: 500; Referee: Artur Safaryan

17 September 2016 6	Ararat Yerevan	0 – 2	Banants	Yerevan
18:00 (UTC+4)	K.Brou (yellow card) 5'; S.Kone (yellow card) 44'; Nwabueze (yellow card) 47'; A.Petrosyan (yellow card) 82'	Report	Badoyan 3'; G.Khuloyan (yellow card) 28'; Torrejón (yellow card) 42'; A.Hovhannisyan 76'	Stadium: Vazgen Sargsyan Republican Stadium; Attendance: 400; Referee: Gevorg Eghoyan

27 September 2016 7	Shirak	0 – 1	Banants	Gyumri
16:00 (UTC+4)	Stošković (yellow card) 39'; Aleksanyan (yellow card) 55'; M.Kaba (yellow card) 65'; A.Davoyan (yellow card) 80'; A.Muradyan (yellow card) 89'	Report	N.Minasyan 51'; Burayev (yellow card) 89'	Stadium: Gyumri City Stadium; Attendance: 500; Referee: Artur Safaryan

2 October 2016 8	Banants	0 – 3	Alashkert	Yerevan
16:00 (UTC+4)	Adams (yellow card) 63'	Report	Artu.Yedigaryan 17', 37'; Arta.Yedigaryan (yellow card) 31'; M.Manasyan (yellow card) 34' (goal) 69'; Fomenko (yellow card) 53'; Minasyan (yellow card) 70'	Stadium: Banants Stadium; Attendance: 800; Referee: Zaven Hovhannisyan

15 October 2016 9	Gandzasar Kapan	4 – 0	Banants	Kapan
14:00 (UTC+4)	Claudir 11'; Memović 14'; G.Gogatishvili 28'; Aleksanyan (yellow card) 33'; Wal 50'	Report		Stadium: Gandzasar Stadium; Attendance: 800; Referee: Zaven Hovhannisyan

23 October 2016 10	Banants	0 – 1	Pyunik	Yerevan
15:00 (UTC+4)	Adams (yellow card) 34'; H. Hakobyan (yellow card) 45'; Torrejón (yellow card) 75'	Report	A.Shakhnazaryan 27'; Grigoryan (yellow card) 57'; Avetisyan (yellow card) 75'	Stadium: Banants Stadium; Attendance: 1,000; Referee: Artur Safaryan

26 October 2016 11	Banants	0 – 0	Ararat Yerevan	Yerevan
15:00 (UTC+4)	H. Hakobyan (yellow card) 39'; E.Yeghiazaryan (yellow card) 74'; A.Bareghamyan (yellow card) 75'	Report	G.Poghosyan (yellow card) 54'	Stadium: Banants Stadium; Attendance: 900; Referee: Zaven Hovhannisyan

29 October 2016 12	Banants	1 – 2	Shirak	Yerevan
15:00 (UTC+4)	H.Avagyan (yellow card) 5'; Adams (yellow card) 12'; Aghekyan 22' (yellow card) 26'; H.Hambardzumyan (yellow card) 41'; V.Ayvazyan (yellow card) 81'	Report	V.Ayvazyan 6' (pen.); Hovsepyan (yellow card) 34'; M.Kaba 45+1'; A.Hovhannisyan (yellow card) 56'; D.Hakobyan (yellow card) 82'; Prljević (yellow card) 90+2'	Stadium: Banants Stadium; Attendance: 500; Referee: Artur Safaryan

5 November 2016 13	Alashkert	4 – 1	Banants	Yerevan
14:00 (UTC+4)	Arta.Yedigaryan 6', 79'; K.Veranyan 71'; M.Manasyan (yellow card) 81'; Grigoryan 90+2'	Report	V.Ayvazyan 37'; H.Hambardzumyan (yellow card) 83'	Stadium: Alashkert Stadium; Attendance: 300; Referee: Artur Simonyan

19 November 2016 14	Banants	1 – 1	Gandzasar Kapan	Yerevan
15:00 (UTC+4)	A.Kocharyan 16'; A.Avagyan (yellow card) 29'; Adams (yellow card) 45'	Report	Ar.Petrosyan (yellow card) 5'; G.Harutyunyan 27' (yellow card) 58'; G.Gogatishvili (yellow card) 32'	Stadium: Banants Stadium; Attendance: 1,000; Referee: Suren Baliyan

22 November 2016 15	Pyunik	1 – 1	Banants	Yerevan
16:00 (UTC+4)	Hovhannisyan 10'	Report	H.Ilangyozyan 66'; E.Vardanyan (yellow card) 77'	Stadium: Yerevan Football Academy Stadium; Attendance: 200; Referee: Artur Simonyan

27 November 2016 16	Ararat Yerevan	1 – 1	Banants	Yerevan
16:00 (UTC+4)	P.Ayvazyan (yellow card) 39'; M.Sahakyan 57'; G.Tumbaryan (yellow card) 76'	Report	Laércio 34' (pen.) (yellow card) 66'; N.Petrosyan (yellow card) 90+3'	Stadium: Vazgen Sargsyan Republican Stadium; Attendance: 100; Referee: Zaven Hovhannisyan

4 December 2016 17	Banants	0 – 1	Shirak	Yerevan
14:00 (UTC+4)	V.Ayvazyan (yellow card) 85'	Report	A.Mikaelyan (yellow card) 60'; M.Kaba (yellow card) 82'; V.Bichakhchyan 89'; A.Ayvazov (yellow card) 90+3'	Stadium: Banants Stadium; Attendance: 600; Referee: Artur Safaryan

4 March 2017 18	Banants	1 – 2	Alashkert	Yerevan
14:00 (UTC+4)	K.Melkonyan 89'	Report	Voskanyan (yellow card) 8'; Minasyan 27' (yellow card) 42'; Nenadović 32'; Grigoryan (yellow card) 41'; Kvekveskiri (yellow card) 78'	Stadium: Banants Stadium; Attendance: 1,000; Referee: Artur Safaryan

11 March 2017 19	Gandzasar Kapan	1 – 0	Banants	Yerevan
14:00 (UTC+4)	Wal 75'; Claudir (yellow card) 85'	Report	A.Bareghamyan (yellow card) 22'; Injac (yellow card) 55'	Stadium: Vazgen Sargsyan Republican Stadium; Attendance: 200; Referee: Suren Baliyan

19 March 2017 20	Banants	0 – 3	Pyunik	Yerevan
14:00 (UTC+4)	Adams (yellow card) 37'	Report	A.Manucharyan (yellow card) 4'; V.Hayrapetyan 24'; V.Pogosyan 45+3' (pen.); A.Nahapetyan 78'	Stadium: Banants Stadium; Attendance: 1,000; Referee: Zaven Hovhannisyan

31 March 2017 21	Banants	2 – 1	Ararat Yerevan	Yerevan
15:00 (UTC+4)	Injac 35', 67'; E.Yeghiazaryan (yellow card) 38'	Report	G.Tumbaryan 81'; A.Petrosyan (yellow card) 90+3'	Stadium: Banants Stadium; Attendance: 700; Referee: Zaven Hovhannisyan

7 April 2017 22	Shirak	1 – 0	Banants	Gyumri
16:00 (UTC+4)	Ivanović (yellow card) 24'; R.Darbinyan (yellow card) 61'; Nwabueze 89' (yellow card) 89'	Report	V.Ayvazyan (yellow card) 26'	Stadium: Gyumri City Stadium; Attendance: 400; Referee: Artur Safaryan

14 April 2017 23	Alashkert	2 – 0	Banants	Yerevan
16:00 (UTC+4)	Arta.Yedigaryan 29', 49' (yellow card) 87'	Report	Ghazaryan (red card) 25'; Ayrapetyan (yellow card) 52'; K.Harutyunyan (yellow card) 77'	Stadium: Alashkert Stadium; Attendance: 300; Referee: Suren Baliyan

22 April 2017 24	Banants	0 – 0	Gandzasar Kapan	Yerevan
17:00 (UTC+4)	H.Hambardzumyan (yellow card) 35'; M.Grigoryan (yellow card) 90+4'	Report	Memović 80'	Stadium: Banants Stadium; Attendance: 500; Referee: Artur Simonyan

30 April 2017 25	Pyunik	0 – 0	Banants	Yerevan
19:00 (UTC+4)	A.Shakhnazaryan (yellow card) 56'; A.Nadiryan (yellow card) 80'	Report	K.Melkonyan (yellow card) 82'	Stadium: Yerevan Football Academy Stadium; Attendance: 500; Referee: Artur Safaryan

6 May 2017 26	Ararat Yerevan	1 – 0	Banants	Yerevan
17:00 (UTC+4)	A.Petrosyan (yellow card) 66'; D.Minasyan 73'	Report	Adams (yellow card) 24'; V.Drobarov (yellow card) 39'; H.Voskanyan	Stadium: Banants-3; Attendance: 150; Referee: Gevorg Eghoyan

14 May 2017 27	Shirak	1 – 0	Banants	Gyumri
17:00 (UTC+4)	V.Ayvazyan (yellow card) 39'; Udo 78'	Report	H.Hambardzumyan (yellow card) 19'; V.Ayvazyan (yellow card) 58'	Stadium: Gyumri City Stadium; Attendance: 300; Referee: Artur Simonyan

19 May 2017 28	Banants	0 – 3	Alashkert	Yerevan
17:00 (UTC+4)	Injac (yellow card) 24'; H. Hakobyan (yellow card) 61'; Z.Margaryan (yellow card) 73'	Report	M.Manasyan 49'; K.Veranyan (yellow card) 59'; Arta.Yedigaryan 66'; Dashyan 70'	Stadium: Banants Stadium; Attendance: 500; Referee: Gevorg Eghoyan

27 May 2017 29	Gandzasar Kapan	2 – 1	Banants	Yerevan
19:00 (UTC+4)	G.Harutyunyan 21' (pen.); Wal 62'; A.Karapetyan (yellow card) 67' (yellow-red card) 90+2'; Wbeymar (yellow card) 89'	Report	V.Drobarov (yellow card) 23'; Injac (yellow card) 27'; E.Yeghiazaryan 36'	Stadium: Vazgen Sargsyan Republican Stadium; Attendance: 250; Referee: Zaven Hovhannisyan

31 May 2017 30	Banants	0 – 2	Pyunik	Yerevan
17:00 (UTC+4)	H.Voskanyan (yellow card) 62'	Report	V.Pogosyan (yellow card) 20'; S.Spertsyan 39' (yellow card) 42'; N.Aslanyan (yellow card) 45'; Vardanyan (yellow card) 63'; V.Begoyan 76'	Stadium: Banants Stadium; Attendance: 500; Referee: Suren Baliyan

==== Table ====
Pos	Team	Pld	W	D	L	GF	GA	GD	Pts	Qualification
1	Alashkert (C)	30	19	7	4	59	26	+33	64	Qualification for the Champions League first qualifying round
2	Gandzasar Kapan	30	17	6	7	38	24	+14	57	Qualification for the Europa League first qualifying round (Note: Shirak qualified for Europa League first qualifying round by winning the 2016–17 Armenian Cup. However, since they already qualified for European competition based on their league position, the spot awarded to the cup winners was passed down the league.)
3	Shirak	30	16	5	9	31	24	+7	53	Qualification for the Europa League first qualifying round
4	Pyunik	30	12	9	9	35	27	+8	45	Qualification for the Europa League first qualifying round
5	Banants	30	5	6	19	18	44	−26	21	
6	Ararat Yerevan	30	3	3	24	17	53	−36	12	

Source: Football Federation of Armenia (in Armenian), Soccerway
Rules for classification: 1) Points; 2) Play-off (only if deciding champion); 3) Matches won; 4) Head-to-head points; 5) Head-to-head matches won; 6) Head-to-head goal difference; 7) Head-to-head goals scored; 8) Head-to-head away goals scored; 9) Goal difference; 10) Goals scored.
(C) Champions

=== Armenian Cup ===
21 September 2016 Quarterfinal 1st leg	Ararat Yerevan	1 – 2	Banants	Yerevan
18:00 (UTC+4)	O.Kaina (yellow card) 47'; N.Kpehia 73'; S.Kone (yellow card) 77'	Report	O.Hambardzumyan 6'; E.Movsesyan 46'	Stadium: Vazgen Sargsyan Republican Stadium; Attendance: 100; Referee: Artur Safaryan

18 October 2016 Quarterfinal 2nd leg	Banants	0 – 1 (2 – 2 (a) agg.)	Ararat Yerevan	Yerevan
15:00 (UTC+4)	Adams (yellow card) 37'; Burayev (yellow card) 45'	Report	V.Arzoyan (yellow card) 36'; G.Tumbaryan 63'; S.Metoyan (yellow card) 67'; A.Derdzyan (yellow card) 76'	Stadium: Banants Stadium; Attendance: 600; Referee: Artur Safaryan

11 April 2017 Semifinal 1st leg	Pyunik	2 – 1	Banants	Yerevan
16:00 (UTC+4)	Avetisyan 36'; A.Bareghamyan 52' (o.g.); N.Aslanyan (yellow card) 83'; V.Voskonyan (yellow card) 90+1'	Report	Injac 28'; Adams (yellow card) 30'; V.Ayvazyan (yellow card) 60'	Stadium: Yerevan Football Academy Stadium; Attendance: 200; Referee: Artur Simonyan

25 April 2017 Semifinal 2nd leg	Banants	0 – 1 (1 – 3 agg.)	Pyunik	Yerevan
16:00 (UTC+4)	Injac (yellow card) 14'; V.Ayvazyan (yellow card) 56'; Drobarov (yellow card) 63'; E.Yeghiazaryan (yellow card) 76' (yellow-red card) 78'	Report	A.Manucharyan (yellow card) 18'; A.Kartashyan (yellow card) 45+2'; A.Shakhnazaryan 50'	Stadium: Banants Stadium; Attendance: 1,000; Referee: Suren Baliyan

=== UEFA Europa League ===
==== Qualifying rounds ====
30 June 2016 First qualifying round 1st leg	Banants (Armenia)	0 – 1	(Cyprus) Omonia	Yerevan, Armenia
20:00 (UTC+4)	Kachmazov (yellow card) 90+3'	Report	Derbyshire 26'; Margaça (yellow card) 54'; Panteliadis (yellow card) 71'	Stadium: Vazgen Sargsyan Republican Stadium (Note: Banants played their home match at Vazgen Sargsyan Republican Stadium, Yerevan, instead of their regular stadium Banants Stadium, Yerevan.); Attendance: 1,520; Referee: Mario Zebec (Croatia)

7 July 2016 First qualifying round 2nd leg	Omonia (Cyprus)	4 – 1 (a.e.t.) (5 – 1 agg.)	(Armenia) Banants	Nicosia, Cyprus
20:30 (UTC+4)	Roushias 93', 108' (yellow card) 101'; Georgallides (yellow card) 93'; Sheridan (yellow card) 104'; Derbyshire 114'; Cleyton 120+1'	Report	Kachmazov (yellow card) 6'; Adams (yellow card) 27'; Burayev 71' (yellow card) 72'; Torrejón (yellow card) 81'	Stadium: GSP Stadium; Attendance: 8,042; Referee: Aleksandrs Anufrijevs (Latvia)

== Statistics ==
As of match played 31 May 2017

=== Appearances and goals ===
No.	Pos	Nat	Player	Total		Premier League		Armenian Cup		UEFA Europa League	
No.	Pos	Nat	Player	Apps	Goals	Apps	Goals	Apps	Goals	Apps	Goals
1	GK	(Armenia) ARM	Grigor Makaryan	5	0	2+1	0	2	0	0	0
2	DF	(Armenia) ARM	Hakob Hambardzumyan	18	0	15+1	0	2	0	0	0
3	DF	(Armenia) ARM	Gevorg Khuloyan	18	0	15+1	0	1+1	0	0	0
4	MF	(Armenia) ARM	Aleksandr Hovhannisyan	11	1	8+2	1	0	0	0+1	0
5	MF	(Armenia) ARM	Hakob Hakobyan	21	0	12+4	0	2+1	0	2	0
6	FW	(Armenia) ARM	Orbeli Hambardzumyan	6	1	2+3	0	1	1	0	0
7	MF	(Armenia) ARM	Aram Bareghamyan	26	0	21+2	0	3	0	0	0
8	MF	(Armenia) ARM	Valter Poghosyan	8	0	3+2	0	1	0	2	0
9	MF	(Armenia) ARM	Aram Kocharyan	8	1	4+2	1	0+2	0	0	0
10	FW	(Armenia) ARM	Norayr Gyozalyan	13	0	10+1	0	2	0	0	0
11	MF	(Armenia) ARM	Nairi Minasyan	8	0	3+2	0	3	0	0	0
12	FW	(Serbia) SRB	Nenad Injac	12	3	10	2	2	1	0	0
13	FW	(Armenia) ARM	Hayk Voskanyan	9	0	4+3	0	0+2	0	0	0
14	MF	(Armenia) ARM	Emil Yeghiazaryan	14	2	5+7	2	2	0	0	0
15	DF	(Armenia) ARM	Aghavard Petrosyan	2	0	2	0	0	0	0	0
16	FW	(Armenia) ARM	Grigor Aghekyan	13	1	7+5	1	1	0	0	0
17	FW	(Armenia) ARM	Hovhannes Ilangyozyan	14	1	7+6	1	0+1	0	0	0
18	MF	(Armenia) ARM	Vahagn Ayvazyan	28	1	17+6	1	3	0	1+1	0
19	DF	(North Macedonia) MKD	Vlatko Drobarov	35	1	27+2	1	4	0	2	0
20	MF	(Armenia) ARM	Karen Harutyunyan	10	0	5+3	0	2	0	0	0
21	DF	(Armenia) ARM	Artur Avagyan	18	0	13+3	0	1+1	0	0	0
22	GK	(Armenia) ARM	Stepan Ghazaryan	18	0	16	0	0	0	2	0
23	DF	(Armenia) ARM	Narek Petrosyan	17	0	6+8	0	2+1	0	0	0
24	FW	(Armenia) ARM	Edgar Movsesyan	7	1	1+3	0	1	1	0+2	0
26	DF	(Armenia) ARM	Zhirayr Margaryan	5	0	5	0	0	0	0	0
55	DF	(Russia) RUS	Layonel Adams	23	0	15+2	0	4	0	2	0
70	GK	(Russia) RUS	Aram Ayrapetyan	11	0	8+1	0	2	0	0	0
77	MF	(Armenia) ARM	Aram Loretsyan	5	0	3+2	0	0	0	0	0
91	GK	(Armenia) ARM	Henri Avagyan	4	0	4	0	0	0	0	0
	DF	(Armenia) ARM	Gagik Maghakyan	2	0	2	0	0	0	0	0
	DF	(Armenia) ARM	Hayk Sargsyan	1	0	1	0	0	0	0	0
	MF	(Armenia) ARM	Ashot Adamyan	2	0	2	0	0	0	0	0
	MF	(Armenia) ARM	Aram Khamoyan	6	0	0+5	0	0+1	0	0	0
	MF	(Armenia) ARM	Karen Melkonyan	7	0	6+1	0	0	0	0	0
	MF	(Armenia) ARM	Vardan Safaryan	1	0	0+1	0	0	0	0	0
	MF	(Armenia) ARM	Erik Vardanyan	3	0	3	0	0	0	0	0
	FW	(Armenia) ARM	Martin Grigoryan	4	0	0+3	0	0+1	0	0	0
Players who left Banants during the season:
2	DF	(Russia) RUS	Aslan Kalmanov	6	0	3+1	0	0	0	2	0
6	DF	(Russia) RUS	Soslan Kachmazov	10	0	6+1	0	1	0	2	0
7	MF	(Armenia) ARM	Petros Avetisyan	2	0	0	0	0	0	0+2	0
9	MF	(Armenia) ARM	Vardges Satumyan	14	1	8+5	1	0+1	0	0	0
10	FW	(Brazil) BRA	Laércio	17	3	16	3	1	0	0	0
14	MF	(Peru) PER	Claudio Torrejón	20	0	16	0	1+1	0	2	0
15	DF	(North Macedonia) MKD	Jasmin Mecinović	1	0	0	0	0	0	1	0
17	MF	(Armenia) ARM	Zaven Badoyan	14	2	11+1	2	0	0	2	0
90	FW	(Russia) RUS	Atsamaz Burayev	15	1	8+4	1	0+1	0	2	0

=== Goal scorers ===
Place	Position	Nation	Number	Name	Premier League	Armenian Cup	UEFA Europa League	Total
1	FW	(Brazil)	10	Laércio	3	0	0	3
1	FW	(Serbia)	12	Nenad Injac	2	1	0	3
3	MF	(Armenia)	17	Zaven Badoyan	2	0	0	2
3	FW	(Russia)	90	Atsamaz Burayev	1	0	1	2
5	MF	(Armenia)	9	Aram Kocharyan	1	0	0	1
5	FW	(Armenia)	17	Hovhannes Ilangyozyan	1	0	0	1
5	MF	(Armenia)	11	Nairi Minasyan	1	0	0	1
5	DF	(North Macedonia)	19	Vlatko Drobarov	1	0	0	1
5	MF	(Armenia)		Karen Melkonyan	1	0	0	1
5	MF	(Armenia)	18	Vahagn Ayvazyan	1	0	0	1
5	MF	(Armenia)	4	Alexander Hovhannisyan	1	0	0	1
5	FW	(Armenia)	16	Grigor Aghekyan	1	0	0	1
5	MF	(Armenia)	9	Vardges Satumyan	1	0	0	1
5	MF	(Armenia)	14	Emil Yeghiazaryan	1	0	0	1
5	FW	(Armenia)	6	Orbeli Hambardzumyan	0	1	0	1
5	FW	(Armenia)	24	Edgar Movsesian	0	1	0	1
				TOTALS	18	3	1	22

=== Clean sheets ===
Place	Position	Nation	Number	Name	Premier League	Armenian Cup	UEFA Europa League	Total
1	GK	(Armenia)	22	Stepan Ghazaryan	4	0	0	4
2	GK	(Armenia)	91	Henri Avagyan	1	0	0	1
2	GK	(Russia)	70	Aram Ayrapetyan	1	0	0	1
				TOTALS	6	0	0	6

=== Disciplinary record ===
Number	Nation	Position	Name	Premier League		Armenian Cup		UEFA Europa League		Total	
Number	Nation	Position	Name	Yellow card	Red card	Yellow card	Red card	Yellow card	Red card	Yellow card	Red card
2	(Armenia)	DF	Hakob Hambardzumyan	4	0	0	0	0	0	4	0
3	(Armenia)	DF	Gevorg Khuloyan	1	0	0	0	0	0	1	0
5	(Armenia)	MF	Hakob Hakobyan	4	0	0	0	0	0	4	0
7	(Armenia)	MF	Aram Bareghamyan	4	0	0	0	0	0	4	0
12	(Serbia)	FW	Nenad Injac	3	0	1	0	0	0	4	0
13	(Armenia)	FW	Hayk Voskanyan	2	0	0	0	0	0	2	0
14	(Armenia)	MF	Emil Yeghiazaryan	2	0	2	1	0	0	4	1
16	(Armenia)	FW	Grigor Aghekyan	1	0	0	0	0	0	1	0
18	(Armenia)	MF	Vahagn Ayvazyan	4	0	2	0	0	0	6	0
19	(North Macedonia)	DF	Vlatko Drobarov	2	0	1	0	0	0	3	0
20	(Armenia)	MF	Karen Harutyunyan	1	0	0	0	0	0	1	0
21	(Armenia)	DF	Artur Avagyan	1	0	0	0	0	0	1	0
22	(Armenia)	GK	Stepan Ghazaryan	1	1	0	0	0	0	1	1
23	(Armenia)	DF	Narek Petrosyan	1	0	0	0	0	0	1	0
26	(Armenia)	DF	Zhirayr Margaryan	1	0	0	0	0	0	1	0
55	(Russia)	DF	Layonel Adams	6	0	2	0	1	0	9	0
70	(Russia)	GK	Aram Ayrapetyan	1	0	0	0	0	0	1	0
91	(Armenia)	GK	Henri Avagyan	1	0	0	0	0	0	1	0
	(Armenia)	MF	Karen Melkonyan	1	0	0	0	0	0	1	0
	(Armenia)	MF	Erik Vardanyan	1	0	0	0	0	0	1	0
	(Armenia)	FW	Martin Grigoryan	1	0	0	0	0	0	1	0
Players who left Banants during the season:
6	(Russia)	DF	Soslan Kachmazov	0	0	0	0	2	0	2	0
10	(Brazil)	FW	Laércio	4	0	0	0	0	0	4	0
14	(Peru)	MF	Claudio Torrejón	3	0	0	0	1	0	4	0
90	(Russia)	FW	Atsamaz Burayev	2	0	1	0	1	0	4	0
			TOTALS	52	1	9	1	5	0	66	2
