= 2015–16 Armenian Cup =

Tournament details
- Country: Armenia
- Teams: 8

Tournament statistics
- Matches played: 13
- Goals scored: 26 (2 per match)

The 2015–16 Armenian Cup is the 25th season of Armenia's football knockout competition. It featured the eight 2015–16 Premier League teams, but no team from the 2015–16 First Division. The tournament began on 21 October 2015, with Pyunik the defending champions, having won their seventh title the previous season.

== Results ==
=== Quarter-finals ===
All eight Premier League clubs competed in this round. The first legs were played on 21 and 28 October 2015, while the second legs were played on 4 and 25 November 2015.

Team 1	Agg.	Team 2	1st leg	2nd leg
Mika	2–1	Shirak	1–1	1–0
Pyunik	1–3	Gandzasar Kapan	1–3	0–0
Alashkert	5–0	Ararat Yerevan	1–0	4–0
Ulisses	2–4	Banants	0–3	2–1

=== Semi-finals ===
The first legs were played on 15 and 16 March 2016 and the second legs were played on 12 and 13 April 2016.

16 March 2016 1st leg	Mika	0–1	Gandzasar Kapan	Yerevan
14:00 (UTC+4)	Kiselyov (yellow card) 25'; Dmitry Lushnikov (yellow card) 42'; Chakhvashvili (yellow card) 61'	Report	Rakić 39'; H.Grigoryan (yellow card) 55'	Stadium: Vazgen Sargsyan Republican Stadium; Attendance: 400; Referee: Artur Simonyan

13 April 2016 2nd leg	Gandzasar Kapan	0–1 (a.e.t.) (1–1 agg.) (5 – 6 p)	Mika	Kapan
15:00 (UTC+4)	Barseghyan (yellow card) 33'; Memović (yellow card) 89'	Report	A.Karapetyan (yellow card) 29'; Shumilin (yellow card) 32'; Kiselyov 42'; Yarmolitsky (yellow card) 69'	Stadium: Gandzasar Stadium; Attendance: 1,500; Referee: Suren Baliyan
	Penalties
	Beglaryan (penalty missed); A.Khachatryan (penalty scored); Gogatishvili (penalty scored); Barseghyan (penalty scored); Harutyunyan (penalty scored); H.Asoyan (penalty scored); Musonda (penalty missed)		(penalty scored) A.Kiselyov; (penalty scored) Shumilin; (penalty missed) Chicherin; (penalty scored) E.Mkrtchyan; (penalty scored) T.Chmaychanin; (penalty scored) A.Kpehia; (penalty scored) Kudinov

15 March 2016 1st leg	Banants	0–1	Alashkert	Yerevan
14:00 (UTC+4)	Drobarov (yellow card) 30'; Torrejón (red card) 77'	Report	Voskanyan (yellow card) 30'; M.Manasyan (yellow card) 31'; Héber 45'; Arakelyan (yellow card) 57'; K.Veranyan (red card) 77'; Ga.Poghosyan (red card) 85'	Stadium: Banants Stadium; Attendance: 600; Referee: Suren Baliyan

12 April 2016 2nd leg	Alashkert	1–2 (2–2 agg.)	Banants	Yerevan
15:00 (UTC+4)	Arta.Yedigaryan (yellow card) 54'; Héber (yellow card) 78'; Artu.Yedigaryan (yellow card) 80'; Voskanyan 90+5'	Report	Badoyan 14'; H. Hakobyan (yellow card) 31'; Mecinović (yellow card) 65'; Laércio 75' (yellow card) 79'; Kachmazov (yellow card) 80'; López (yellow card) 90+6'	Stadium: Alashkert Stadium; Attendance: 500; Referee: Zaven Hovhannisyan

=== Final ===
Final was played on 4 May 2016.

4 May 2016
19:00 AMT

Banants	2–0	Mika
Laércio 3' (pen.); Drobarov (yellow card) 31'; Burayev 38'; Torrejón (yellow card) 57'; Ghazaryan (yellow card) 69'; López (yellow card) 70'; Mecinović (yellow card) 88'	Report	Chistyakov (yellow card) 2'; Shumilin (yellow card) 40'; A.Kpenia (yellow card) 45'; D.Lushnikov (yellow card) 57'; Kovačević (yellow card) 65'; Chakhvashvili (yellow card) 81'

Republican Stadium, Yerevan
Attendance: 3,000
Referee: Suren Baliyan
