= Burayev =

Burayev (masculine, Russian: Бураев) or Burayeva (feminine, Russian: Бураева) is a Russian surname. Notable people with the surname include:

- Atsamaz Burayev (born 1990), Russian football player
- Viktor Burayev (born 1982), Russian race walker
