= 2015–16 Armenian First League =

Football league season

The 2015–16 Armenian First League season began on 3 August 2015 and finished on 27 May 2016.

== League table ==
Pos	Team	Pld	W	D	L	GF	GA	GD	Pts
1	Alashkert II (C)	28	22	3	3	65	22	+43	69
2	Mika II	28	17	3	8	50	28	+22	54
3	Banants II	28	15	3	10	67	30	+37	48
4	Pyunik II	28	14	2	12	55	45	+10	44
5	Ararat II	28	13	2	13	37	39	−2	41
6	Shirak II	28	11	5	12	47	48	−1	38
7	Gandzasar II	28	5	4	19	25	80	−55	19
8	Ulisses II	28	3	2	23	34	88	−54	11

Source: soccerway.com
Rules for classification: 1) points; 2) goal difference; 3) number of goals scored
(C) Champions

== See also ==
- 2015–16 Armenian Premier League
- 2015–16 Armenian Cup
