= Ismaël Zagrè =

Burkinabe footballer

Personal information
- Full name: Ben Aziz Ismaël Zagrè
- Date of birth: 21 December 1992 (age 33)
- Place of birth: Ouagadougou, Burkina Faso
- Height: 1.87 m (6 ft 1 1/2 in)
- Position: Centre-back

Senior career*
Years	Team	Apps	(Gls)
2009–2015	KOZAF		
2015–2016	Ulisses	8	(0)
2016–2017	KOZAF		
2017–2022	Salitas		
2022–2023	Vita Club		

International career^{‡}
2016–2019	Burkina Faso	5	(1)
- * Club domestic league appearances and goals as of 5 December 2024 ‡ National team caps and goals as of 12 June 2026

Ben Aziz Ismaël Zagrè (born 21 December 1992) is a Burkinabé footballer.

The former Salitas player was announced as a signing by Congolese AS Vita Club in August 2022. He helped Vita Club progress from the 2022–23 CAF Champions League qualifying rounds, though a "blunder" had led to the opponent Gaborone United scoring. He was released in 2023 as a part of a 17-player outflux.

== Career statistics ==
=== Club ===
As of match played 4 November 2019

Appearances and goals by club, season and competition
Club	Season	League			National Cup		Continental		Other		Total	
Club	Season	Division	Apps	Goals	Apps	Goals	Apps	Goals	Apps	Goals	Apps	Goals
Ulisses	2015–16	Armenian Premier League	8	0	1	0	-		-		9	0
Career total			8	0	1	0	-	-	-	-	9	0

=== International ===
Burkina Faso national team
Year	Apps	Goals
2016	1	0
2017	1	0
2018	0	0
2019	3	1
Total	5	1

Statistics accurate as of match played 20 October 2019

=== International goals ===
Scores and results list Burkina Faso goal tally first.

#	Date	Venue	Opponent	Score	Result	Competition
1.	4 September 2019	Stade Mhamid, Marrakesh, Morocco	Libya	1–0	1–0	Friendly
