= Vlatko Drobarov =

Macedonian footballer

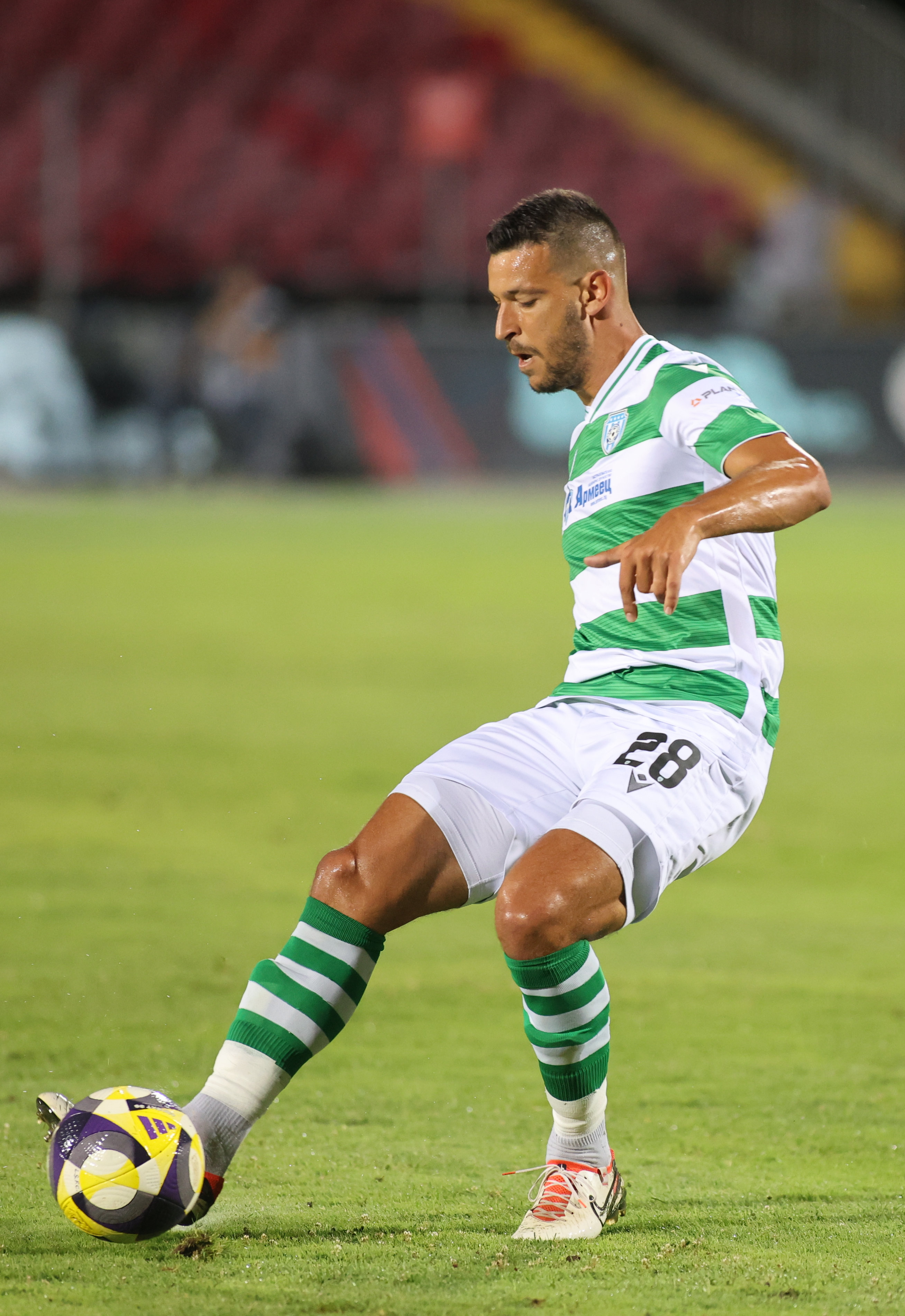

Personal information
- Date of birth: 2 November 1992 (age 34)
- Place of birth: Skopje, Macedonia
- Height: 1.87 m (6 ft 2 in)
- Position: Centre-back

Team information
- Current team: Sliema Wanderers
- Number: 28

Youth career
- –2010: Vardar

Senior career*
| Years | Team | Apps | (Gls) |
| 2010–2011 | Skopje | 21 | (0) |
| 2011–2012 | Napredok | 29 | (1) |
| 2012–2013 | Teteks | 17 | (1) |
| 2013–2014 | Murciélagos | 27 | (2) |
| 2014–2015 | Teteks | 22 | (0) |
| 2015–2017 | Banants | 52 | (1) |
| 2017–2018 | Aris Limassol | 23 | (0) |
| 2018 | Ohod Club | 0 | (0) |
| 2018–2019 | Belasica | 30 | (1) |
| 2019–2020 | Kerala Blasters | 13 | (1) |
| 2020–2022 | Cherno More | 47 | (2) |
| 2022 | Sarajevo | 14 | (0) |
| 2023–2026 | Cherno More | 103 | (7) |
| 2026– | Sliema Wanderers | 7 | (0) |

International career
| 2010–2011 | Macedonia U19 | 9 | (0) |
| 2012–2013 | Macedonia U21 | 5 | (0) |
- * Club domestic league appearances and goals as of 13 October 2026

Vlatko Drobarov (Macedonian: Влатко Дробаров; born 2 November 1992) is a Macedonian professional footballer who plays as a centre-back for Maltese Premier League club Sliema Wanderers.

== Career ==
In September 2013, Drobarov moved to Liga Premier de México club Murciélagos. He was part of the ranks of A PFG club Cherno More between October 2020 and June 2022.

== Career statistics ==
=== Club ===
As of match played 1 June 2025

Appearances and goals by club, season and competition
| Club | Season | League | | | National cup | | Continental | | Other | | Total | |
| Club | Season | Division | Apps | Goals | Apps | Goals | Apps | Goals | Apps | Goals | Apps | Goals |
|---|---|---|---|---|---|---|---|---|---|---|---|---|
| Skopje | 2010–11 | Macedonian First League | 21 | 0 | | | – | | 1 | 0 | 22 | 0 |
| Napredok | 2011–12 | Macedonian First League | 29 | 1 | 2 | 0 | – | | – | | 31 | 1 |
| Teteks | 2012–13 | Macedonian First League | 17 | 0 | 2 | 0 | – | | – | | 19 | 0 |
| Murciélagos | 2013–14 | Liga Premier | 27 | 2 | | | – | | – | | 27 | 2 |
| Teteks | 2014–15 | Macedonian First League | 22 | 0 | 5 | 1 | – | | – | | 27 | 1 |
| Banants | 2015–16 | Armenian Premier League | 29 | 1 | 5 | 0 | – | | – | | 34 | 1 |
| Banants | 2016–17 | Armenian Premier League | 23 | 0 | 4 | 0 | 2 | 0 | 1 | 0 | 30 | 0 |
| Banants | Total | | 52 | 1 | 9 | 0 | 2 | 0 | 1 | 0 | 64 | 1 |
| Aris Limassol | 2017–18 | Cypriot First Division | 23 | 0 | 0 | 0 | – | | – | | 23 | 0 |
| Ohod Club | 2018–19 | Saudi Professional League | 0 | 0 | 0 | 0 | – | | – | | 0 | 0 |
| Belasica | 2018–19 | Macedonian First League | 30 | 1 | 0 | 0 | – | | – | | 30 | 1 |
| Kerala Blasters | 2019–20 | Indian Super League | 13 | 1 | 0 | 0 | – | | – | | 13 | 1 |
| Cherno More | 2020–21 | Bulgarian First League | 17 | 1 | 1 | 0 | — | | 1 | 0 | 19 | 1 |
| Cherno More | 2021–22 | Bulgarian First League | 30 | 1 | 2 | 0 | — | | — | | 32 | 1 |
| Cherno More | Total | | 47 | 2 | 3 | 0 | 0 | 0 | 1 | 0 | 51 | 2 |
| FK Sarajevo | 2022–23 | Premier League BH | 14 | 0 | 1 | 0 | – | | – | | 15 | 0 |
| Cherno More | 2022–23 | Bulgarian First League | 12 | 2 | 3 | 0 | — | | — | | 15 | 2 |
| Cherno More | 2023–24 | Bulgarian First League | 28 | 2 | 1 | 0 | — | | — | | 29 | 2 |
| Cherno More | 2024–25 | Bulgarian First League | 31 | 3 | 5 | 0 | 2 | 0 | — | | 38 | 3 |
| Cherno More | Total | | 71 | 7 | 9 | 0 | 2 | 0 | 0 | 0 | 82 | 7 |
| Career total | | | 366 | 15 | 31 | 1 | 4 | 0 | 2 | 0 | 403 | 16 |

== Honours ==
Teteks

- Macedonian Cup: 2012–13

Banants

- Armenian Cup: 2015–16

Cherno More

- Bulgarian League: Runner-up 2023–24
