= Ramil Zaripov =

Russian footballer

Personal information
- Full name: Ramil Ravilyevich Zaripov
- Date of birth: 3 May 1992 (age 34)
- Place of birth: Moscow, Russia
- Height: 1.85 m (6 ft 1 in)
- Position: Defender

Youth career
- FC Moscow
- FC Rubin Kazan

Senior career*
Years	Team	Apps	(Gls)
2011	FC Rubin-2 Kazan	18	(0)
2012	FC Istra	9	(1)
2013–2014	FC Lokomotiv-2 Moscow	30	(0)
2015	FC Oryol	1	(0)
2015	FC Mika	15	(0)
2016	FC Vityaz Podolsk	7	(0)
2016	FC Volgar Astrakhan	8	(1)
2017–2019	FSK Dolgoprudny	46	(0)
2019	FC Kolomna	8	(1)
2020	FC Murom	6	(0)
2021–2022	FC Kyzyltash Bakhchisaray		
- * Club domestic league appearances and goals

Ramil Ravilyevich Zaripov (Russian: Рамиль Равильевич Зарипов; born 3 May 1992) is a Russian former football defender.

== Club career ==
He made his debut in the Russian Second Division for FC Rubin-2 Kazan on 25 April 2011 in a game against FC Zenit-Izhevsk Izhevsk.

He made his Russian Football National League debut with FC Volgar Astrakhan on 6 August 2016 in a game against FC Dynamo Moscow.
