= Armen Petikyan =

Armenian footballer

Personal information
- Date of birth: 19 February 1972 (age 54)
- Height: 1.82 m (5 ft 11 1/2 in)
- Position: Defender

International career
Years	Team	Apps	(Gls)
2000–2003	Armenia	5	(0)

Armen Petikyan (born 19 February 1972) is an Armenian football player. He has played for Armenia national team.

== National team statistics ==
Armenia national team
Year	Apps	Goals
2000	2	0
2001	1	0
2002	1	0
2003	1	0
Total	5	0
