= 2015–16 Armenian Premier League =

Armenian Premier League
- Season: 2015–16
- Champions: Alashkert
- Matches: 60
- Goals: 148 (2.47 per match)
- Top goalscorer: Héber (16); Mihran Manasyan (16)
- Biggest home win: Pyunik 5–1 Banants (8 August 2015); Banants 5–1Ulisses (21 November 2015); Alashkert 4–0 Ulisses (22 August 2015); Pyunik 4–0 Gandzasar (1 November 2015)
- Biggest away win: Alashkert 1–4 Pyunik (27 September 2015); Ulisses 1–4 Pyunik (8 November 2015); Ulisses 0–3 Alashkert (25 October 2015)
- Highest scoring: Pyunik 5–1 Banants (8 August 2015); Banants 5–1Ulisses (21 November 2015)
- Longest winning run: 4 matches: Alashkert
- Longest unbeaten run: 7 matches: Alashkert
- Longest winless run: 15 matches: Ulisses
- Longest losing run: 6 matches: Ulisses
- All statistics correct as of 1 December 2015.

The 2015–16 Armenian Premier League season is the 24th since its establishment. The season began on 1 August 2015 and ended up on 22 May 2016. FC Pyunik are the defending champions.

== Teams ==
The eight teams from the 2014–15 Premier League will all compete in this year's competition.

Locations of the 2015–16 Armenian Premier League teams

| Club | Location | Stadium | Capacity |
|---|---|---|---|
| Alashkert | Yerevan (Shengavit) | Alashkert Stadium | 6,850 |
| Ararat Yerevan | Yerevan (Kentron) | Vazgen Sargsyan | 14,403 |
| Banants | Yerevan (Malatia-Sebastia) | Banants Stadium | 4,860 |
| Gandzasar Kapan | Kapan | Gandzasar Stadium | 3,500 |
| Mika | Yerevan (Shengavit) | Mika Stadium | 7,250 |
| Pyunik | Yerevan (Avan) | Football Academy Stadium | 1,428 |
| Shirak | Gyumri | Gyumri City Stadium | 2,844 |
| Ulisses | Yerevan (Kentron) | Vazgen Sargsyan | 14,403 |

=== Personnel and sponsorship ===
| Team | Chairman | Head coach | Captain | Kit manufacturer | Shirt sponsor |
|---|---|---|---|---|---|
| Alashkert | (Armenia) Bagrat Navoyan | (Armenia) Abraham Khashmanyan | (Armenia) Vahagn Minasyan | Joma | Bagratour |
| Ararat Yerevan | (Switzerland) Hrach Kaprielyan | (Armenia) Varuzhan Sukiasyan | (Armenia) Gorik Khachatryan | adidas | |
| Banants | (Armenia) Karlen Mkrtchyan | (Spain) Tito Ramallo | (Armenia) Stepan Ghazaryan | Umbro | |
| Gandzasar Kapan | (Armenia) Vahe Hakobyan | (Armenia) Ashot Barseghyan | (Armenia) Aleksandr Petrosyan | adidas | ZCMC |
| Mika | (Armenia) Carlos Ghazaryan (until Sept. 2015) (Armenia) Armen Petikyan (Sept. 2015 - Oct. 2015) (Armenia) Khoren Hovhannisyan (Nov. 2015 - May 2016) (Armenia) Armen Petikyan(May 2016) | (Armenia) Armen Shahgeldyan | (Armenia) Arsen Beglaryan | Puma | |
| Pyunik | (Armenia) Rafik Hayrapetyan | (Armenia) Sargis Hovsepyan | (Armenia) Taron Voskanyan | Nike | Armenian Development Bank |
| Shirak | (Armenia) Arman Sahakyan | (Armenia) Vardan Bichakhchyan | (Armenia) Karen Aleksanyan | adidas | Anelik Bank |
| Ulisses | (Armenia) Genrikh Ghazandzhyan | (Armenia) Gagik Simonyan | (Armenia) Armen Tigranyan | adidas | |

=== Managerial changes ===
| Team | Outgoing manager | Manner of departure | Date of vacancy | Position in table | Incoming manager | Date of appointment |
|---|---|---|---|---|---|---|
| Banants | (Slovakia) Zsolt Hornyák | End of contract | 30 June 2015 | Pre-season | (Armenia) Aram Voskanyan | 1 July 2015 |
| Mika | (Armenia) Aram Voskanyan | End of contract | 30 June 2015 | Pre-season | (Armenia) Armen Adamyan | 1 July 2015 |
| Ulisses | (Armenia) Suren Chakhalyan | Mutual consent | 1 September 2015 | 8th | (Armenia) Gagik Simonyan (interim) | 1 September 2015 |
| Banants | (Armenia) Aram Voskanyan | Mutual consent | 11 October 2015 | 7th | (Spain) Tito Ramallo | 12 October 2015 |
| Mika | (Armenia) Armen Adamyan | Mutual consent | 18 January 2016 | 6th | (Russia) Sergei Yuran | 19 January 2016 |
| Mika | (Russia) Sergei Yuran | Mutual consent | 4 May 2016 | 7th | (Armenia) Armen Shahgeldyan | 5 May 2016 |

== League table ==
| Pos | Team | Pld | W | D | L | GF | GA | GD | Pts | Qualification or relegation |
|---|---|---|---|---|---|---|---|---|---|---|
| 1 | Alashkert (C) | 28 | 16 | 7 | 5 | 50 | 24 | +26 | 55 | Qualification for the Champions League first qualifying round |
| 2 | Shirak | 28 | 15 | 7 | 6 | 41 | 27 | +14 | 52 | Qualification for the Europa League first qualifying round |
| 3 | Pyunik | 28 | 13 | 9 | 6 | 44 | 21 | +23 | 48 | Qualification for the Europa League first qualifying round |
| 4 | Gandzasar Kapan | 28 | 11 | 12 | 5 | 35 | 27 | +8 | 45 | |
| 5 | Ararat Yerevan | 28 | 9 | 10 | 9 | 28 | 31 | −3 | 37 | |
| 6 | Banants | 28 | 7 | 12 | 9 | 36 | 34 | +2 | 33 | Qualification for the Europa League first qualifying round (Note: Banants qualified for the Europa League first qualifying round by winning the 2015–16 Armenian Cup.) |
| 7 | Mika | 28 | 9 | 5 | 14 | 30 | 32 | −2 | 32 | |
| 8 | Ulisses (D) | 28 | 0 | 2 | 26 | 8 | 76 | −68 | 2 | Expelled (Note: In February 2016, Ulisses were expelled from the league after their licence was revoked due to both financial and non-financial shortcomings. Since more than half of the matches had been played at the time, the matches scheduled to take place after the licence was revoked were decided as 3–0 losses.) |

Source: Football Federation of Armenia, Soccerway
Rules for classification: 1) Points; 2) Play-off (only if deciding champion); 3) Matches won; 4) Head-to-head points; 5) Head-to-head matches won; 6) Head-to-head goal difference; 7) Head-to-head goals scored; 8) Head-to-head away goals scored; 9) Goal difference; 10) Goals scored.
(C) Champions; (D) Disqualified

== Results ==
The league was played in four stages. The teams played four times with each other, twice at home and twice away, for a total of 28 matches per team.

=== First half of season ===
| Home \ Away | ALA | ARA | BAN | GAN | MIK | PYU | SHI | ULI |
|---|---|---|---|---|---|---|---|---|
| Alashkert | | 1–1 | 3–0 | 0–0 | 2–0 | 1–4 | 2–0 | 4–0 |
| Ararat Yerevan | 1–2 | | 0–0 | 2–2 | 2–1 | 1–1 | 0–2 | 2–0 |
| Banants | 2–2 | 3–0 | | 1–1 | 1–1 | 0–1 | 1–1 | 5–1 |
| Gandzasar Kapan | 2–2 | 1–0 | 1–1 | | 2–1 | 1–1 | 1–1 | 3–0 |
| Mika | 0–1 | 0–1 | 1–0 | 2–3 | | 1–0 | 0–1 | 1–0 |
| Pyunik | 1–2 | 0–1 | 5–1 | 4–0 | 2–1 | | 3–0 | 2–0 |
| Shirak | 1–2 | 0–1 | 1–1 | 2–1 | 2–0 | 0–2 | | 3–2 |
| Ulisses | 0–3 | 1–2 | 2–2 | 0–0 | 0–2 | 1–4 | 0–1 | |

Source: Football Federation of Armenia
Legend: Blue = home team win; Yellow = draw; Red = away team win.

=== Second half of season ===
| Home \ Away | ALA | ARA | BAN | GAN | MIK | PYU | SHI | ULI |
|---|---|---|---|---|---|---|---|---|
| Alashkert | | 0–1 | 2–1 | 3–0 | 2–1 | 3–0 | 2–3 | 3–0 |
| Ararat Yerevan | 0–0 | | 1–2 | 0–2 | 0–4 | 1–2 | 1–1 | 3–0 |
| Banants | 2–0 | 2–2 | | 0–0 | 1–1 | 1–1 | 0–1 | 3–0 |
| Gandzasar Kapan | 2–2 | 0–0 | 2–1 | | 3–1 | 1–0 | 0–0 | 3–0 |
| Mika | 0–2 | 1–1 | 0–0 | 2–0 | | 0–0 | 1–4 | 3–0 |
| Pyunik | 0–0 | 0–0 | 1–2 | 0–0 | 2–1 | | 1–1 | 3–0 |
| Shirak | 2–1 | 2–1 | 3–1 | 2–1 | 0–1 | 1–1 | | 3–0 |
| Ulisses | 0–3 | 0–3 | 0–3 | 0–3 | 0–3 | 0–3 | 0–3 | |

Source: Football Federation of Armenia
Legend: Blue = home team win; Yellow = draw; Red = away team win.

== Top goalscorers ==
| Rank | Player | Team | Goals |
|---|---|---|---|
| 1 | (Brazil) Héber | Alashkert | 16 |
| 1 | (Armenia) Mihran Manasyan | Alashkert | 16 |
| 3 | (Brazil) Laercio | Banants | 10 |
| 4 | (Armenia) Vardan Pogosyan | Pyunik | 9 |
| 5 | (Armenia) Vardges Satumyan | Pyunik | 7 |
| 6 | (Armenia) Gevorg Nranyan | Ararat | 6 |
| 6 | (Russia) Atsamaz Buraev | Gandzasar | 6 |
| 6 | (Ivory Coast) Konan Odilon Kouakou | Shirak | 6 |

== Attendances ==
| # | Football club | Home games | Average attendance |
|---|---|---|---|
| 1 | FC Gandzasar Kapan | 14 | 1,373 |
| 2 | FC Banants Yerevan | 14 | 800 |
| 3 | FC Shirak | 14 | 754 |
| 4 | FC Alashkert | 14 | 546 |
| 5 | FC Mika | 14 | 431 |
| 6 | FC Pyunik | 14 | 427 |
| 7 | FC Ararat Yerevan | 14 | 282 |
| 8 | Ulisses FC | 14 | 164 |

== See also ==
- 2015–16 Armenian First League
- 2015–16 Armenian Cup
