= Ioseb Chakhvashvili =

Georgian Football Midfielder

Personal information
- Full name: Ioseb Chakhvashvili
- Date of birth: 3 August 1993 (age 33)
- Place of birth: Tbilisi, Georgia
- Position: Midfielder

Team information
- Current team: Korabi Peshkopi

Youth career
- 2009–2010: Norchi Dinamo

Senior career*
Years	Team	Apps	(Gls)
2011–2012	Norchi Dinamo	7	(2)
2012–2014	Spartaki Tskhinvali	2	(0)
2014–2015	Saba Qom	3	(0)
2016	Mika	4	(0)
2016	Dila Gori	10	(1)
2017–	Korabi Peshkopi	7	(0)
- * Club domestic league appearances and goals

Ioseb Chakhvashvili (Georgian: იოსებ ჩახვაშვილი born 3 August 1993) is a Georgian football midfielder who plays for KF Korabi Peshkopi in Albanian First Division.

== Club career ==
=== Saba Qom ===
Chakhvashvili has played with Saba Qom since 2014. He made his debut in a league match against Padideh on 29 January 2015, subbed in for Mohammad Ousani. He is the second choice young player for Saba Qom.
