= Laércio Carreirinha =

Brazilian footballer (born 1990)

Personal information
- Full name: Laércio Gomes Costa
- Date of birth: 3 February 1990 (age 36)
- Place of birth: Caiabu, Brazil
- Height: 1.70 m (5 ft 7 in)
- Position: Striker

Team information
- Current team: Akhaa Ahli Aley
- Number: 33

Youth career
- 2006–2007: Profute
- 2007–2010: Avaí

Senior career*
Years	Team	Apps	(Gls)
2010–2012	Avaí	50	(11)
2011	→ Boa Esporte (loan)	8	(0)
2013	América-MG	11	(2)
2013	América-RN	6	(1)
2014	Tombense	1	(0)
2014	Portuguesa	11	(0)
2014	Metropolitano	3	(0)
2015–2017	Banants	45	(19)
2017	Prachuap	36	(12)
2018	Atlético Tubarão	5	(0)
2020–2021	Lao Toyota	3	(1)
2021–2022	Malkiya Club		
2022	União Luziense		
2023–2025	Akhaa Ahli Aley	10	(1)
2026-	Nacional F.C de Tiros		
- * Club domestic league appearances and goals as of 14 May 2026

Laércio Gomes Costa, sometimes known as Laércio Carreirinha or simply Laércio (born 3 February 1990), is a Brazilian professional footballer who plays as a striker for semi-professional club Nacional de Tiros from Tiros, Minas Gerais.

== Career ==
Born in Caiabu, São Paulo, Laércio began his career in Profute's youth categories in 2006, moving to Avaí in August 2007. He was subsequently assigned to the youth side, being promoted to the first-team in 2010.

After struggling to make his breakthrough, Laércio moved to Boa Esporte on loan in 2011. However, after being sparingly used during the season, he returned to Avaí in December, with his side being relegated from Série A. In the following season, Laércio began being more utilized after the arrival of Argel Fucks; however, his contract was not renewed and he was subsequently released.

On 9 January 2013, Laércio joined América-MG. However, in August he moved to América-RN. In the following year Laércio joined lowly Tombense, leaving the side after only one match, and moving to Portuguesa.

Laércio left FC Banants following their last game before the winter break, in December 2016.

== Career statistics ==
As of match played 27 November 2016

Appearances and goals by club, season and competition
Club	Season	League			National cup		Continental		Other		Total	
Club	Season	Division	Apps	Goals	Apps	Goals	Apps	Goals	Apps	Goals	Apps	Goals
Avaí	2010	Série A	8	1	1	2	1	0	2	0	12	3
Avaí	2011	Série A	0	0	0	0	–		1	0	1	0
Avaí	2012	Série B	22	5	0	0	–		12	3	34	8
Avaí	Total		30	6	1	2	1	0	15	3	47	11
Boa Esporte (loan)	2011	Série B	8	0	0	0	–		–		8	0
América Mineiro	2013	Série B	4	1	2	0	–		5	1	11	2
América de Natal	2013	Série B	6	1	0	0	–		–		6	1
Tombense	2014	Série D	0	0	0	0	–		1	0	1	0
Portuguesa	2014	Série B	6	0	2	1	–		5	0	13	1
Metropolitano	2014	Série D	3	0	0	0	–		–		3	0
Banants	2015–16	Armenian Premier League	22	10	5	5	–		–		27	15
Banants	2016–17	Armenian Premier League	16	3	1	0	0	0	1	0	18	3
Banants	Total		38	13	6	5	0	0	1	0	45	19
PT Prachuap Fc	2017	Thai League 1	30	10	6	2						
Career total			125	31	11	8	1	0	27	4	140	35

== Honours ==
Avai

- Campeonato Catarinense: 2010,2012

Banants

- Armenian Cup: 2015-2016
