= Tito Ramallo =

Spanish footballer and manager

Personal information
- Full name: Rogelio Ramallo Peña
- Date of birth: 29 April 1969 (age 57)
- Place of birth: A Coruña, Spain
- Height: 1.76 m (5 ft 9 in)
- Position: Defender

Youth career
- Victoria

Senior career*
| Years | Team | Apps | (Gls) |
| 1987–1992 | Deportivo B | | |
| 1992–1993 | Bergantiños | | |

Managerial career
- 1999–2001: Deportivo (youth)
- 2001–2012: Deportivo B
- 2015–2016: FC Banants
- 2017–2018: Cerceda
- 2018: Deportivo B
- * Club domestic league appearances and goals

Rogelio "Tito" Ramallo Peña (born 29 April 1969), is a Spanish retired footballer who played as a defender, and is a current manager.

== Profile ==
Born in A Coruña, Ramallo played as a defender for Deportivo de La Coruña during his career extended between 1987 and 1993. After spending a long coaching career at Deportivo de La Coruña B between 2001 and 2012, he managed the Armenian Premier League club FC Banants between October 2015 and October 2016.

In May 2016, he won the 2015–16 Armenian Cup title with his club Banants Yerevan.

== Managerial statistics ==
As of 21 October 2018

Managerial record by team and tenure
| Team | Nat | From | To | Record | | | | | | | | Ref |
| Team | Nat | From | To | G | W | D | L | GF | GA | GD | Win % | Ref |
|---|---|---|---|---|---|---|---|---|---|---|---|---|
| Deportivo B | (Spain) | 1 July 2001 | 15 May 2012 | 436 | 212 | 113 | 111 | 668 | 445 | +223 | 48.62 | |
| FC Banants | (Armenia) | 12 October 2015 | 3 October 2016 | 36 | 14 | 9 | 13 | 47 | 41 | +6 | 38.89 | |
| Cerceda | (Spain) | 11 July 2017 | 28 January 2018 | 23 | 4 | 4 | 15 | 13 | 33 | −20 | 17.39 | |
| Deportivo B | (Spain) | 15 June 2018 | 22 October 2018 | 9 | 1 | 1 | 7 | 7 | 13 | −6 | 11.11 | |
| Total | | | | 504 | 231 | 127 | 146 | 735 | 532 | +203 | 45.83 | — |
