= Soslan Kachmazov =

Russian footballer (born 1991)

Personal information
- Full name: Soslan Vladimirovich Kachmazov
- Date of birth: 14 July 1991 (age 35)
- Place of birth: Vladikavkaz, Russian SFSR
- Height: 1.80 m (5 ft 11 in)
- Position: Defender

Team information
- Current team: FC Alania Vladikavkaz
- Number: 4

Senior career*
Years	Team	Apps	(Gls)
2010	FC Alania Vladikavkaz	0	(0)
2011–2012	FC FAYUR Beslan	16	(1)
2012–2013	FC Olimpia	20	(0)
2013–2014	FC Alania-d Vladikavkaz	18	(0)
2014–2015	FC Alania Vladikavkaz	34	(1)
2016–2017	FC Banants	17	(0)
2017	FC Kuban-Holding Pavlovskaya		
2018–2019	FC Spartak Vladikavkaz	12	(0)
2019–	FC Alania Vladikavkaz	147	(6)
- * Club domestic league appearances and goals as of 15 November 2026

Soslan Vladimirovich Kachmazov (Russian: Сослан Владимирович Качмазов; born 14 July 1991) is a Russian football defender who plays for FC Alania Vladikavkaz.

== Club career ==
The pupil of the football school of the Vladikavkaz "Spartak", in 2010, spoke for his backup team in the primaries of doubles. In 2011, he made his debut in the second division as part of the "Fayur" team from Beslan.

In the spring of 2012 he moved to the Moldavian "Olympia". The first match in the championship of Moldova was played on May 6, 2012, against Zimbru, going on to replace in the 71st minute instead of Sergei Gusakov . In just a calendar year, I played 20 matches in the national championship.

In 2013 he returned to Russia and began to speak for "Alania", in the season of 2013/14 played for a double, and then – for the main line-up. In three incomplete seasons, the player played 52 games in the second division.

In early 2016, the defender again went abroad, this time to the Armenian "Banants" . The debut match in the Armenian championship was played on March 2, 2016, against Pyunik . In just a calendar year, I played 15 matches in the national championship. With his team he won the Armenian Cup of the season 2015/16, including playing in the final match against "Mika". Also played in the matches of the Europa League against Cypriot Omonia.

After leaving Banants, he was on display in the Belarusian Naftan, but left the team because of disagreements with head coach Oleg Sidorenkov . In 2017, playing at the amateur level for "Kuban-Holding" (Pavlovskaya) became the champion of the Krasnodar Territory.
