= Jasmin Mecinovikj =

Macedonian footballer

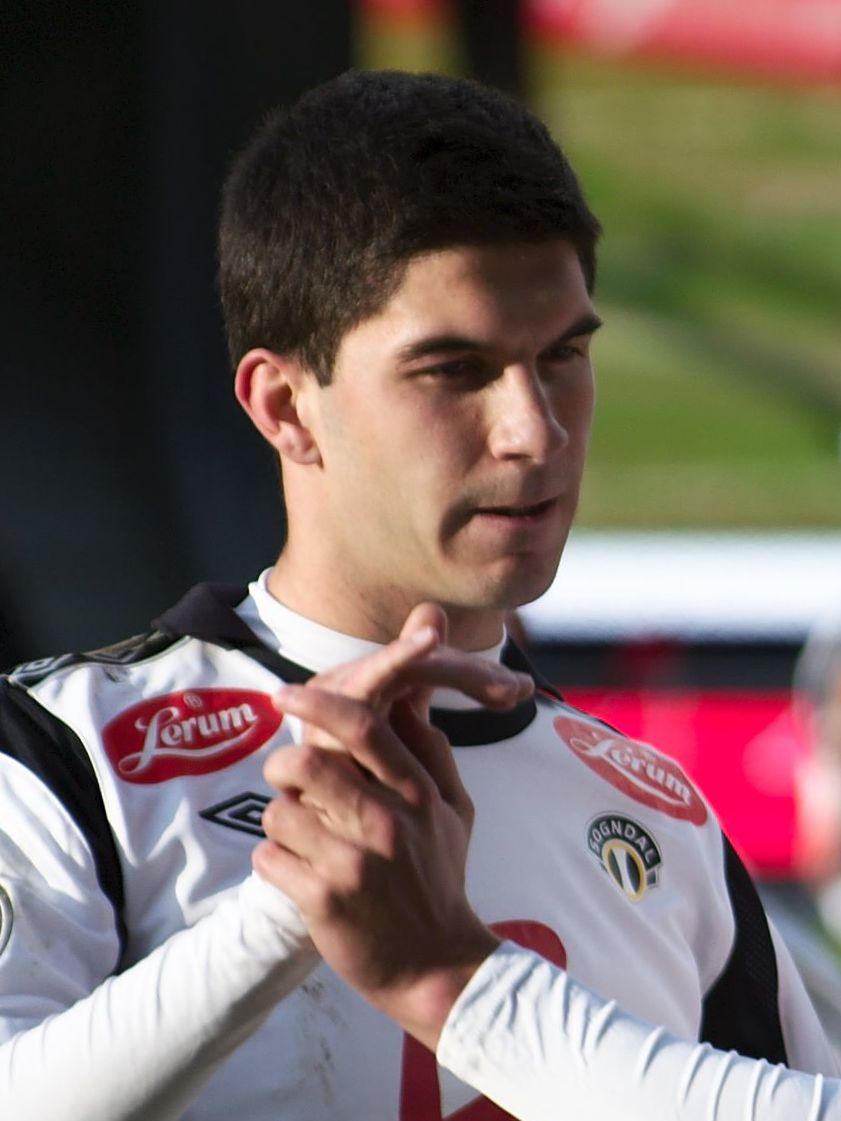
- Mecinovikj with Sogndal in 2012

Personal information
- Full name: Jasmin Mecinovikj
- Date of birth: 22 October 1990 (age 36)
- Place of birth: Čačak, SR Serbia, SFR Yugoslavia
- Height: 1.93 m (6 ft 4 in)
- Position: Centre-back

Team information
- Current team: Skopje

Senior career*
Years	Team	Apps	(Gls)
2010	Skopje	17	(0)
2011	Sheriff Tiraspol	7	(0)
2011	Tiraspol	1	(0)
2012	Sogndal	2	(0)
2012–2013	Egri	20	(0)
2013	Lombard-Pápa	6	(0)
2014	Makedonija	9	(1)
2014–2015	Renova	34	(0)
2016	Banants	13	(0)
2017	Pelister	7	(0)
2017	Melaka United	6	(1)
2018	Nejmeh	6	(0)
2018	Trepça'89		
2019	Rudar Pljevlja	13	(0)
2019	Podgorica	2	(0)
2020	Persela Lamongan	2	(0)
2020–2021	Struga	46	(1)
2021–2022	Mohammedan	23	(0)
2022	Skopje	13	(0)
2023	Ferizaj	8	(0)
2023–2024	Besa (DD)	25	(1)
2024–2025	Vardar	13	(0)
2025–2026	Rabotnichki	9	(0)
2026–	Skopje	0	(0)

International career
2010–2012	Macedonia U21	13	(0)
- * Club domestic league appearances and goals as of 20 March 2026

Jasmin Mecinovikj (Macedonian: Јасмин Мециновиќ, born 22 October 1990) is a Macedonian professional footballer who plays as a centre-back for Macedonian Second League club Skopje.

== Club career ==
=== Melaka United ===
On 17 May 2017, Mecinovikj signed a contract with Malaysian side Melaka United. He made his debut in a 1–1 draw against PKNS where he collected a red card in that match. On 27 September 2017, he scored his first goal for the club in a 2–1 win over Selangor.

=== Nejmeh ===
After being released by Melaka, Mecinovikj signed with Lebanese Premier League club Nejmeh SC for the 2018 season. However, due to severe injuries, he mutually terminated his contract with the club in May 2018.

=== Rudar Pljevlja ===
On 26 January 2019, Mecinovikj was announced as the new player of FK Rudar Pljevlja.
