= Zaven Badoyan =

Armenian footballer (born 1989)

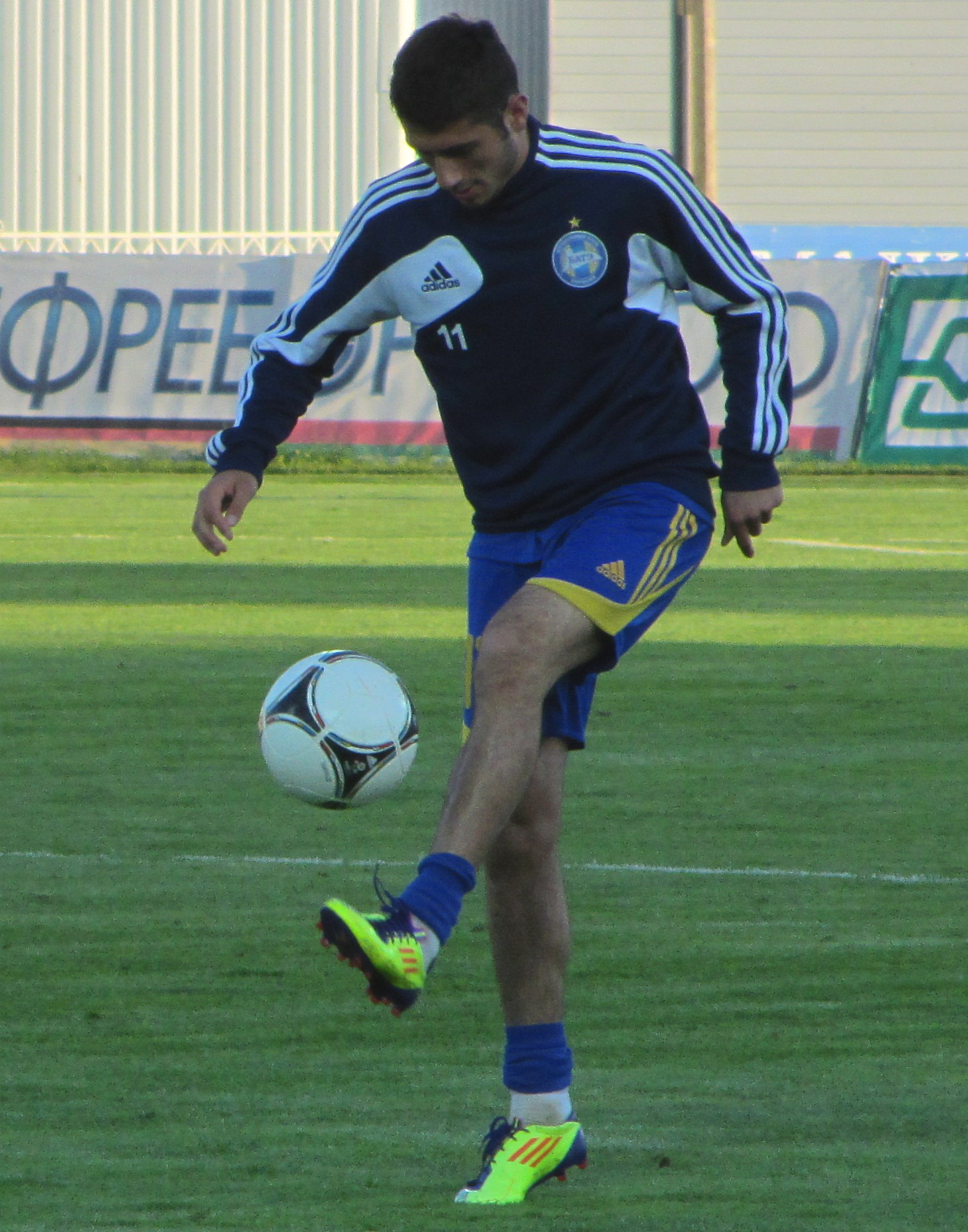
- Badoyan with BATE Borisov in 2012

Personal information
- Full name: Zaven Levonovich Badoyan
- Date of birth: 22 December 1989 (age 36)
- Place of birth: Yerevan, Soviet Union
- Height: 1.74 m (5 ft 9 in)
- Position: Midfielder

Senior career*
Years	Team	Apps	(Gls)
2006–2008	Kilikia Yerevan	40	(2)
2008–2009	Gandzasar Kapan	20	(1)
2010–2011	Impuls	54	(12)
2012–2013	BATE Borisov	16	(1)
2014	Gomel	29	(3)
2015	Pyunik	12	(10)
2015–2016	Banants	22	(6)
2017–2018	Alashkert	10	(3)
2018	Shabab Al Sahel		
2018–2021	Ararat Yerevan	65	(8)
2021–2022	Van	14	(5)
2022–2023	Akzhayik	31	(5)
2023–2025	Afif		

International career^{‡}
2010–2011	Armenia U-21	3	(0)
2011–2016	Armenia	6	(1)
2019	Western Armenia	3	(1)

Managerial career
- 2025–: FC Sardarapat (assistant)
- * Club domestic league appearances and goals as of 29 June 2023 ‡ National team caps and goals as of 5 June 2019

Zaven Badoyan (Armenian: Զավեն Բադոյան; born 22 December 1989) is an Armenian former professional footballer who played as a winger.

== Club career ==
Zaven Badoyan was born in Yerevan. He is a graduate of the local school FIMA. But he first tried his hand at several other sports, and eventually decided to pursue a football career. At 6 years of age he went to football school FIMA, where his first coach was Levon Barseghyan. At 16 years old, he was playing in the professional Armenian Premier League. In 2006, he signed a contract with Kilikia Yerevan advocated by over two seasons. In 2008, while serving in the Army, he played for Gandzasar Kapan, which came in third place at the 2008 Armenian Premier League and was the first medal of Badoyan's career. In January 2010, was meeting with Impuls Dilijan, which subsequently entered into a contract. Badoyan become a major player in the team after spending 27 games out of a possible 28, the same number achieved by Arthur Petrosyan and Avetik Kirakosyan (captain). In December 2011, Badoyan made a 4-year contract with the Belarusian club BATE Borisov. With Badoyan as a member, the club has won the 2012 Belarusian Premier League and 2013 Belarusian Super Cup.

On 21 June 2023, Badoyan joined Saudi Second Division side Afif.

On 5 July 2025, it was announced that Badoyan had retired and would join the coaching staff of the Armenian club Sardarapat.

== International career ==
In late April 2010, he was summoned to the youth Armenia U-21 national team of Armenia, and on 20 May of the same year he made his debut in the junior youth team against Estonia.

In 2011, Badoyan had come to the attention of the coaching staff of the Armenia national football team. It was because of his progression in Impuls Dilijan. Before the game in St. Petersburg, head coach Vardan Minasyan included Badoyan in his list for the upcoming match against Russia. However, Badoyan was not chosen for this game day to play. Badoyan's debut took place on 10 August in a game against the Lithuania. In May 2016, Badoyan scored his first international goal, the seventh in a 7-1 friendly win against Guatemala.

== Personal life ==
His favourite championship is La Liga, favourite club is Barcelona, favourite player is Lionel Messi and favourite coach is Pep Guardiola.

== Career statistics ==
=== International ===
As of 28 May 2016

Armenia
Year	Apps	Goals
2011	2	0
2012	2	0
2014	1	0
2016	1	1
Total	6	1

Scores and results list Armenia's goal tally first, score column indicates score after each Badoyan goal.

List of international goals scored by Zaven Badoyan
No.	Date	Venue	Cap	Opponent	Score	Result	Competition
1	28 May 2016	StubHub Center, Los Angeles, United States	6	Guatemala	7–1	7–1	Friendly

== Honours ==
BATE Borisov

- Belarusian Premier League: 2012, 2013
- Belarusian Super Cup: 2013; runner-up 2012
