= 2014–15 FC Ararat Yerevan season =

Ararat Yerevan
2014–15 season
- Chairman: Hrach Kaprielian
- Manager: Dušan Mijić (4 July - 26 September); Samvel Darbinyan (26 September - 1 December); Suren Chakhalyan (13 December - 14 April); Arthur Minasyan & Varuzhan Sukiasyan (from 28 April)
- Stadium: Hrazdan Stadium
- Premier League: 8th
- Armenian Cup: Quarter-final vs Alashkert
- Top goalscorer: League: Aleksandar Rakić (10); All: Aleksandar Rakić (10)
Home colours	Away colours	Third colours

The 2014–15 season was FC Ararat Yerevan's 24th consecutive season in the Armenian Premier League. Ararat finished the season in 8th position, escaping relegation as no team was promoted. In the Armenian Cup they were knocked out by Pyunik in the Quarterfinals.

== Season events ==
Prior to the start of the season, Ararat traveled to Georgia for a 10-day training camp and three friendly games, with new signings Levon Minasyan, Gor Matirosyan, Ararat Poghosyan and Narek Amiryan. Also part of the travelling squad was trialist Alexander Zelenov, with new French signings Zaven Bulut and Robin Di Lauro joining the squad in Georgia.

At the beginning of August, Ararat signed a trio of players from Los Angeles Misioneros, midfielders Jamel Wallace, Bryan de la Fuente and Christian King. On 23 August, Serbian defender Nikola Prebiračević and American winger Darryl Odom signed for Ararat Yerevan.

On 26 September Samvel Darbinyan replaced Dušan Mijić as manager of Ararat. With Samvel Darbinyan's contract expiring on 1 December, Suren Chakhalyan was appointed manager a week later.

On 1 December, Aleksandar Rakić signed a new one-year contract with Ararat, keeping him at the club until 1 December 2015, whilst Zdravko Kovačević's contract expired and Gor Matirosyan, Christian King and Darryl Odom all the left club by mutual consent a couple days later.

On 16 December, Ararat announced the return of Gorik Khachatryan and Vahe Martirosyan, whilst Armen Durunts and Avetis Ghazatyan departed by mutual consent. The following day, Aram Ayrapetyan joined the club from Banants.

In January Ararat resumed training, taking part in a training camp in Sochi. Whilst at the camp, they signed contracts with Karen Israelyan, Nagui Bouras, Oleksandr Volchkov, Raffi Kaya, Hossein Hosseini, Saman Aghazamani, Amiri Shoeib, Victor Garza, Carlo Chueca and Oumarou Kaina. Ararat also took Jevgenij Moroz and Bavon Tshibuabua on trial, and Jamel Wallace, Čedomir Tomčić and Nikola Prebiračević all left the club after their contract where terminated by mutual consent.

On 14 April, manager Suren Chakhalyan resigned from his role.

== Squad ==
As of match played 30 May 2015

Number	Name	Nationality	Position	Date of birth (age)	Signed from	Signed in	Contract ends	Apps.	Goals
Goalkeepers
1	Aram Ayrapetyan	(Armenia)	GK	22 November 1986 (aged 28)	Banants	2015		9	0
22	Karen Israelyan	(Armenia)	GK	26 March 1992 (aged 23)	Ulisses	2014		4	0
88	Levon Minasyan	(Armenia)	GK	18 October 1990 (aged 23)	Alashkert	2014		3	0
Defenders
2	Vahe Matirosyan	(Armenia)	DF	19 January 1988 (aged 27)	Ulisses	2009			
3	Nagui Bouras	(France)	DF	13 December 1992 (aged 22)	Crossing Schaerbeek	2015		6	0
4	Souleymane Kone	(Ivory Coast)	DF	1 May 1996 (aged 19)	CSKA Sofia	2015		10	0
6	David Ghandilyan	(Armenia)	DF	4 June 1993 (aged 21)	Shirak	2014		8	0
14	Oleksandr Volchkov	(Ukraine)	DF	18 July 1985 (aged 29)	Levadia Tallinn	2015		11	0
18	Gorik Khachatryan	(Armenia)	DF	16 June 1988 (aged 26)	Impuls	2011			
25	Ararat Poghosyan	(Armenia)	DF	11 September 1993 (aged 21)	Banants	2014		8	0
	Karen Khachatryan	(Armenia)	DF	23 June 1997 (aged 17)	Youth team	2014		8	0
	Gor Mkrtumyan	(Armenia)	DF	24 May 1992 (aged 23)	Youth team	2014		3	0
	Shoeyb Amiri	(Iran)	DF	21 September 1987 (aged 27)	Persepolis Shomal	2015		0	0
	Hossein Hosseini	(Iran)	DF	31 August 1988 (aged 26)	Mes Soongoun Varzaghan	2015		0	0
Midfielders
5	Nikolas Proesmans	(Belgium)	MF	11 May 1992 (aged 23)	Újpest	2015		11	0
8	David G. Grigoryan	(Armenia)	MF	17 July 1989 (aged 25)	King Delux	2012			
11	Bryan de la Fuente	(United States)	MF	1 July 1992 (aged 22)	Los Angeles Misioneros	2014		25	5
13	Roman Hovhannisyan	(Armenia)	MF	25 August 1991 (aged 23)	Youth team	2014		1	0
15	Areg Azatyan	(Armenia)	MF	29 June 1990 (aged 24)	Banants	2015		11	1
17	Raffi Kaya	(France)	MF	8 June 1994 (aged 20)	US Ivry	2015		11	0
19	Moisés Orozco	(United States)	MF	6 February 1992 (aged 23)	Dallas City	2015		13	2
21	Victor Garza	(United States)	MF	25 February 1992 (aged 23)	Dallas City	2015		6	0
23	Carlo Chueca	(Peru)	MF	23 March 1993 (aged 22)	Chivas USA	2015		11	2
	Armen Derdzyan	(Armenia)	MF	17 November 1993 (aged 21)	Alashkert	2014		2	0
	Arsen Hovhannisyan	(Armenia)	MF	12 May 1989 (aged 26)	Youth team	2014		1	0
	Saman Aghazamani	(Iran)	MF	14 January 1989 (aged 26)	Rah Ahan	2015		0	0
	Solomon Udo	(Nigeria)	MF	15 July 1995 (aged 19)	K.A.S. Eupen	2015		0	0
Forwards
7	Aleksandar Rakić	(Serbia)	FW	7 January 1987 (aged 28)	Cement Beočin	2013		58	21
9	Mher Sahakyan	(Armenia)	FW	15 July 1995 (aged 19)	Impuls	2013		25	1
10	Arayik Mkrtchyan	(Armenia)	FW	8 July 1993 (aged 21)	Youth team	2014		10	0
20	Oumarou Kaina	(Cameroon)	FW	16 October 1996 (aged 18)	Aspire Academy	2015		9	1
Away on loan
Left during the season
1	Gor Matirosyan	(Armenia)	GK	4 April 1993 (aged 22)	Banants	2014		11	0
3	Avetis Ghazatyan	(Armenia)	DF	2 August 1990 (aged 24)	Youth team	2014		11	0
4	Čedomir Tomčić	(Serbia)	DF	2 August 1990 (aged 24)	Inđija	2014		16	2
5	Tigran Melikyan	(Armenia)	DF	2 August 1990 (aged 24)	Youth team	2014		1	0
6	Jamel Wallace	(United States)	DF	12 August 1987 (aged 27)	Los Angeles Misioneros	2014		13	1
9	Robin Di Lauro	(France)	FW	19 December 1988 (aged 26)	Euga Ardziv	2014		12	4
14	Christian King	(United States)	MF	6 October 1987 (aged 27)	Los Angeles Misioneros	2014		15	2
15	Armen Durunts	(Armenia)	DF	1 November 1990 (aged 24)	Ararat Yerevan II	2013		18	0
17	Zdravko Kovačević	(Serbia)	DF	6 August 1984 (aged 30)	Dinamo Pančevo	2014		11	0
19	Samvel Hakobyan	(Armenia)	FW	11 September 1993 (aged 21)	Mika	2014		1	0
20	Zaven Bulut	(France)	MF	5 February 1992 (aged 23)	Euga Ardziv	2014		12	4
22	Arman Meliksetyan	(Armenia)	GK	21 July 1995 (aged 19)	Banants	2013		4	0
23	Nikola Prebiračević	(Serbia)	DF	23 January 1987 (aged 28)	Leotar	2014		11	0
78	Darryl Odom	(United States)	FW	23 September 1987 (aged 27)		2014		7	0
	Sergey Amroyan	(Armenia)	FW	20 April 1993 (aged 22)	Youth team	2014		1	0

== Transfers ==
=== In ===
Date	Position	Nationality	Name	From	Fee	Ref.
15 July 2014	GK	(Armenia)	Gor Matirosyan	Banants	Undisclosed	
15 July 2014	GK	(Armenia)	Levon Minasyan	Alashkert	Undisclosed	
15 July 2014	DF	(Armenia)	Ararat Poghosyan	Banants	Undisclosed	
17 July 2014	MF	(France)	Zaven Bulut	Euga Ardziv	Undisclosed	
17 July 2014	FW	(France)	Robin Di Lauro	Euga Ardziv	Undisclosed	
29 July 2014	FW	(Serbia)	Čedomir Tomčić	Inđija	Undisclosed	
1 August 2014	MF	(United States)	Bryan de la Fuente	Los Angeles Misioneros	Undisclosed	
1 August 2014	MF	(United States)	Christian King	Los Angeles Misioneros	Undisclosed	
1 August 2014	MF	(United States)	Jamel Wallace	Los Angeles Misioneros	Undisclosed	
1 August 2014	FW	(Armenia)	David Ghandilyan	Shirak	Undisclosed	
23 August 2014	DF	(Serbia)	Nikola Prebiračević	Leotar	Undisclosed	
23 August 2014	FW	(United States)	Darryl Odom	Unknown	Free	
16 December 2014	DF	(Armenia)	Gorik Khachatryan	Unattached	Free	
16 December 2014	FW	(Armenia)	Vahe Martirosyan	Unattached	Free	
17 December 2014	GK	(Armenia)	Aram Ayrapetyan	Banants	Undisclosed	
1 January 2015	DF	(Iran)	Hossein Hosseini	Unattached	Free	
1 January 2015	MF	(Belgium)	Nikolas Proesmans	Unattached	Free	
1 January 2015	MF	(Iran)	Saman Aghazamani	Rah Ahan	Undisclosed	
1 January 2015	MF	(Peru)	Carlo Chueca	Unattached	Free	
1 January 2015	MF	(United States)	Victor Garza	Dallas City	Undisclosed	
5 January 2015	MF	(France)	Raffi Kaya	US Ivry	Undisclosed	
16 January 2015	GK	(Armenia)	Karen Israelyan	Ulisses	Undisclosed	
19 January 2015	MF	(Iran)	Shoeyb Amiri	Persepolis Shomal	Undisclosed	
30 January 2015	DF	(Ukraine)	Oleksandr Volchkov	Levadia Tallinn	Free	
2 February 2015	DF	(France)	Nagui Bouras	Crossing Schaerbeek	Undisclosed	
10 February 2015	MF	(Armenia)	Areg Azatyan	Banants	Undisclosed	
10 February 2015	DF	(Ivory Coast)	Souleymane Kone	CSKA Sofia	Undisclosed	
18 February 2015	MF	(United States)	Moisés Orozco	Dallas City	Undisclosed	
28 February 2015	FW	(Cameroon)	Oumarou Kaina	Aspire Academy	Undisclosed	

=== Released ===
Date	Position	Nationality	Name	Joined	Date	Ref.
3 December 2014	GK	(Armenia)	Gor Matirosyan	Ulisses	28 February 2015	
3 December 2014	DF	(Serbia)	Zdravko Kovačević	Dunav Stari Banovci	1 August 2015	
3 December 2014	MF	(United States)	Christian King			
3 December 2014	FW	(United States)	Darryl Odom			
16 December 2014	DF	(Armenia)	Armen Durunts	Gandzasar Kapan	28 February 2015	
16 December 2014	DF	(Armenia)	Avetis Ghazatyan	Kotayk	1 July 2016	
31 December 2014	GK	(Armenia)	Manvel Afrikyan			
31 December 2014	GK	(Armenia)	Levon Minasyan			
31 December 2014	DF	(Armenia)	Vаchаgаn Kаrаpetyan			
31 December 2014	DF	(Armenia)	Vachik Yeghiazaryan			
31 December 2014	DF	(Serbia)	Nikola Prebiračević	Sūduva Marijampolė		
31 December 2014	DF	(Serbia)	Čedomir Tomčić	Proleter Novi Sad		
31 December 2014	MF	(Armenia)	Tigran Melikyan			
31 December 2014	MF	(France)	Zaven Bulut	Ararat Yerevan	1 July 2015	
31 December 2014	MF	(United States)	Jamel Wallace			
31 December 2014	FW	(France)	Robin Di Lauro			
30 June 2015	GK	(Armenia)	Karen Israelyan			
30 June 2015	DF	(France)	Nagui Bouras			
30 June 2015	DF	(Iran)	Hossein Hosseini	Torpedo Kutaisi	23 March 2016	
30 June 2015	DF	(Ukraine)	Oleksandr Volchkov	Alashkert	23 July 2015	
30 June 2015	DF	(United States)	Victor Garza	Tigres	1 January 2016	
30 June 2015	MF	(Armenia)	David G. Grigoryan	Mika		
30 June 2015	MF	(Armenia)	Arsen Hovhannisyan			
30 June 2015	MF	(Armenia)	Roman Hovhannisyan			
30 June 2015	MF	(Armenia)	Ararat Poghosyan	Alashkert		
30 June 2015	MF	(Belgium)	Nikolas Proesmans	Jesina	1 July 2016	
30 June 2015	MF	(Iran)	Saman Aghazamani	Saba Qom		
30 June 2015	MF	(Iran)	Shoeyb Amiri	Torpedo Kutaisi	23 March 2016	
30 June 2015	MF	(Nigeria)	Solomon Udo	Ulisses		

=== Trialists ===
Date From	Position	Nationality	Name	Previous club	Date To	Ref.
January 2015	DF	(France)	Nagui Bouras	SM Caen II		
January 2015	DF	(Ivory Coast)	Souleymane Kone	CSKA Sofia		
January 2015	DF	(Ukraine)	Oleksandr Volchkov	Levadia Tallinn		
January 2015	MF	(Belgium)	Nikolas Proesmans	Újpest		
January 2015	MF	(Lithuania)	Jevgenij Moroz	Šiauliai		
January 2015	MF	(United States)	Victor Garza	Dallas City		
January 2015	FW	(Democratic Republic of the Congo)	Bavon Tshibuabua	Újpest		
February 2015	MF	(Russia)	Alan Alborov	Smena Komsomolsk-na-Amure		

== Friendlies ==
30 January 2015	Ararat Yerevan (Armenia)	0 – 3	(Russia) Sakhalin Yuzhno-Sakhalinsk	Sochi, Russia
(UTC+4)		Report	6'; 8'; 45' (pen.)

9 February 2015	Ararat Yerevan (Armenia)	0 – 1	(Russia) Afips Afipsky	Sochi, Russia
(UTC+4)		Report	Goal

16 February 2015	Ararat Yerevan (Armenia)	4 – 2	(Russia) Yug-Sport Sochi	Sochi, Russia
(UTC+4)	Rakić; Garza; Aghazamani; M.Orozco	Report	(pen.)

18 February 2015	Ararat Yerevan (Armenia)	0 – 0	(Russia) Khimik Dzerzhinsk	Sochi, Russia
(UTC+4)		Report

== Competitions ==
=== Premier League ===
==== Results summary ====
Overall								Home						Away					
Pld	W	D	L	GF	GA	GD	Pts	W	D	L	GF	GA	GD	W	D	L	GF	GA	GD
28	3	4	21	28	69	−41	13	2	2	10	18	35	−17	1	2	11	10	34	−24

==== Results by round ====
Round	1	2	3	4	5	6	7	8	9	10	11	12	13	14	15	16	17	18	19	20	21	22	23	24	25	26	27	28
Ground	A	H	A	A	H	A	H	H	A	H	H	A	H	A	A	H	A	A	H	A	H	H	A	H	H	A	H	A
Result	L	L	L	L	W	L	L	W	L	L	L	L	L	L	D	L	L	D	L	L	L	L	L	D	L	L	D	W
Position	5	7	8	8	7	7	8	7	7	8	8	8	8	8	8	8	8	8	8	8	8	8	8	8	8	8	8	8

Updated to match(es) played on 30 May 2015. Source: Soccerway
A = Away; H = Home; W = Win; D = Draw; L = Loss

==== Results ====
3 August 2014 1	Alashkert	3 – 2	Ararat Yerevan	Yerevan
18:00 (UTC+4)	Arakelyan 36'; Gyozalyan 70'; Balabekyan 75'	Report	R.Di Lauro 7'; Rakić 69'; T.Melikyan (yellow card) 82'	Stadium: Alashkert Stadium; Attendance: 700; Referee: Suren Baliyan

9 August 2014 2	Ararat Yerevan	0 – 2	Shirak	Yerevan
19:00 (UTC+4)		Report	Bougouhi 83', 90+2'	Stadium: Hrazdan Stadium; Attendance: 100; Referee: Sanuk Fahradyan

17 August 2014 3	Banants	3 – 0	Ararat Yerevan	Yerevan
17:00 (UTC+4)	Hovsepyan 23' (pen.) (yellow card) 41'; G.Nranyan 32', 60'	Report	G.Khachatryan (yellow card) 22'; Z.Bulut (yellow card) 31'; R.Di Lauro (yellow card) 63'; G.Matirosyan (yellow card) 88'	Stadium: Banants Stadium; Attendance: 200; Referee: Manuk Fahradyan

23 August 2014 4	Ulisses	2 – 0	Ararat Yerevan	Yerevan
17:00 (UTC+4)	Dugalić 43'; Aleksanyan 50' (pen.)	Report	C.King (yellow card) 45'; Prebiračević (red card) 49'	Stadium: Republican Stadium; Attendance: 200; Referee: Artur Simonyan

30 August 2014 5	Ararat Yerevan	2 – 0	Mika	Yerevan
19:00 (UTC+4)	de la Fuente 32' (yellow card) 67'; A.Durunts (yellow card) 88'; Rakić 90+4'	Report	Grigoryan (yellow card) 45'; Petrosyan (red card) 72'; R.Ghazaryan (yellow card) 81'	Stadium: Hrazdan Stadium; Attendance: 300; Referee: Artur Safaryan

13 September 2014 6	Pyunik	4 – 0	Ararat Yerevan	Yerevan
16:10 (UTC+4)	Hovhannisyan 5'; Manoyan 30', 31'; G.Poghosyan (yellow card) 38'; Romero 59'; Aslanyan (yellow card) 90+2'	Report	A.Poghosyan (yellow card) 32'; C.King (yellow card) 53'; Tomčić (yellow card) 58'	Stadium: Avan Academy Stadium; Attendance: 300; Referee: Manuk Fahradyan

21 September 2014 7	Ararat Yerevan	1 – 5	Gandzasar	Yerevan
17:00 (UTC+4)	de la Fuente 63'	Report	V.Palagnyuk 12' (pen.), 84' (yellow card) 90'; Ghazaryan 34' (o.g.); Monakhov (yellow card) 43'; Daudov 45'; Melkonyan 61'	Stadium: Hrazdan Stadium; Attendance: 200; Referee: Artur Safaryan

28 September 2014 8	Ararat Yerevan	2 – 1	Alashkert	Yerevan
17:00 (UTC+4)	Rakić 2', 84'; C.King (yellow card) 25'; Wallace (yellow card) 78'; Grigoryan (yellow card) 82' de la Fuente (yellow card) 90+2'	Report	Gyozalyan 45' (pen.)	Stadium: Hrazdan Stadium; Attendance: 50; Referee: Atur Simonyan

4 October 2014 9	Shirak	3 – 2	Ararat Yerevan	Gyumri
15:40 (UTC+4)	D.Marikyan 25' (yellow card) 71'; Barikyan 34' (pen.); Diarrassouba 44'; Grigoryan (yellow card) 63'	Report	R.Di Lauro (yellow card) 32' (goal) 57'; Tomčić 59'; Z.Bulut (yellow card) 69'	Stadium: Gyumri City Stadium; Attendance: 800; Referee: Artur Simonyan

19 October 2014 10	Ararat Yerevan	4 – 6	Banants	Yerevan
17:00 (UTC+4)	Prebiračević (yellow card) 15' (yellow-red card) 43'; Wallace 40'; Rakić 52', 68'; Tomčić 70'	Report	Hanzel 12', 62'; Daghbashyan 15'; Ayvazyan 20'; Poghosyan 75'; Nranyan 87'	Stadium: Hrazdan Stadium; Attendance: 100; Referee: Artur Simonyan

25 October 2014 11	Ararat Yerevan	2 – 3	Ulisses	Yerevan
16:00 (UTC+4)	C.King 27', 39'; Rakić (yellow card) 32' de la Fuente (yellow card) 39'; Grigoryan (yellow card) 79'	Report	Goharyan 5'; Aleksanyan 33' (pen.); Lalić (yellow card) 38' (yellow-red card) 45'; Musonda 44'	Stadium: Hrazdan Stadium; Attendance: 100; Referee: Artur Safaryan

2 November 2014 12	Mika	3 – 1	Ararat Yerevan	Yerevan
14:40 (UTC+4)	R.Ghazaryan 4'; V.Sаtumyan 12', 23'; V.Movsisyan (yellow card) 25'; Petrosyan (yellow card) 59'	Report	Wallace (yellow card) 29'; Rakić 75'	Stadium: Mika Stadium; Attendance: 300; Referee: Artur Safaryan

8 November 2014 13	Ararat Yerevan	0 – 3	Pyunik	Yerevan
16:10 (UTC+4)	C.King (yellow card) 16' de la Fuente (yellow card) 42'; A.Derdzyan (yellow card) 58'	Report	Yuspashyan (yellow card) 15'; Romero 34', 90+1', 90+3'; V.Minasyan (yellow card) 67'; Hovhannisyan (yellow card) 76'; G.Poghosyan (yellow card) 89'	Stadium: Hrazdan Stadium; Attendance: 150; Referee: Artur Safaryan

23 November 2014 14	Gandzasar	1 – 0	Ararat Yerevan	Kapan
14:40 (UTC+4)	Grigoryan (yellow card) 40'; A.Khachatryan (yellow card) 58'; V.Palagnyuk 75'	Report	Rakić (yellow card) 80'; Wallace (yellow card) 81'	Stadium: Gandzasar Stadium; Attendance: 500; Referee: Artur Simonyan

30 November 2014 15	Alashkert	1 – 1	Ararat Yerevan	Yerevan
14:40 (UTC+4)	M.Manasyan (yellow card) 45' (goal) 66'; Gyozalyan (yellow card) 67'	Report	M.Sahakyan 23'; Z.Bulut (yellow card) 44'; C.King (red card) 45'; A.Ghazatyan (yellow card) 67'	Stadium: Alashkert Stadium; Attendance: 300; Referee: Artur Safaryan

30 May 2015 28	Gandzasar	0 – 3	Ararat Yerevan	Kapan
16:30 (UTC+4)	A.Petrosyan (yellow card) 5'; A.Barseghyan (yellow card) 25'	Report	M.Orozco (yellow card) 15'; Chueca 36', 52' de la Fuente 89'	Stadium: Gandzasar Stadium; Attendance: 500; Referee: Edgar Sahakyan

==== Table ====
Pos	Team	Pld	W	D	L	GF	GA	GD	Pts	Qualification
4	Alashkert	28	10	8	10	32	35	−3	38	Qualification for the Europa League first qualifying round
5	Mika	28	9	10	9	33	34	−1	37	
6	Banants	28	8	8	12	42	46	−4	32	
7	Gandzasar	28	7	8	13	31	44	−13	29	
8	Ararat	28	3	4	21	28	69	−41	13	

Source: uefa.com
Rules for classification: 1) points; 2) goal difference; 3) number of goals scored

=== Armenian Cup ===
17 September 2014 Quarter-final 1st leg	Ararat Yerevan	0 – 2	Alashkert	Yerevan
19:00 (UTC+4)	Tomčić (yellow card) 90'	[ Summary]	Gyozalyan 28'; Malakyan 62'; Balabekyan (yellow card) 86'	Stadium: Hrazdan Stadium; Attendance: 50; Referee: Zaven Hovhannisyan

22 October 2014 Quarter-final 2nd leg	Alashkert	4 – 3 (6 – 3 agg.)	Ararat Yerevan	Yerevan
15:00 (UTC+4)	Minasyan 18', 85'; Manasyan 24'; Hovsepyan (yellow card) 48'; Balabekyan 90'	[ Summary]	Di Lauro 21', 71' de la Fuente 38'; Kovačević (yellow card) 53' (yellow-red card) 86'	Stadium: Alashkert Stadium; Attendance: Manuk Fahradyan; Referee: 250

== Statistics ==
As of match played 30 May 2015

=== Appearances and goals ===
No.	Pos	Nat	Player	Total		Premier League		Armenian Cup	
No.	Pos	Nat	Player	Apps	Goals	Apps	Goals	Apps	Goals
1	GK	(Armenia) ARM	Aram Ayrapetyan	9	0	9	0	0	0
2	DF	(Armenia) ARM	Vahe Martirosyan	8	0	6+2	0	0	0
3	DF	(France) FRA	Nagui Bouras	6	0	6	0	0	0
4	DF	(Ivory Coast) CIV	Souleymane Kone	10	0	9+1	0	0	0
5	MF	(Belgium) BEL	Nikolas Proesmans	11	0	11	0	0	0
6	DF	(Armenia) ARM	David Ghandilyan	8	0	4+4	0	0	0
7	FW	(Serbia) SRB	Aleksandar Rakić	28	10	26	10	2	0
8	MF	(Armenia) ARM	David G. Grigoryan	25	0	16+7	0	2	0
9	FW	(Armenia) ARM	Mher Sahakyan	13	1	8+5	1	0	0
10	FW	(Armenia) ARM	Arayik Mkrtchyan	10	0	4+5	0	0+1	0
11	MF	(United States) USA	Bryan de la Fuente	25	5	22+1	4	2	1
13	MF	(Armenia) ARM	Roman Hovhannisyan	1	0	0+1	0	0	0
14	DF	(Ukraine) UKR	Oleksandr Volchkov	11	0	11	0	0	0
15	MF	(Armenia) ARM	Areg Azatyan	11	1	5+6	1	0	0
17	MF	(France) FRA	Raffi Kaya	11	0	10+1	0	0	0
18	DF	(Armenia) ARM	Gorik Khachatryan	14	0	14	0	0	0
19	MF	(United States) USA	Moisés Orozco	13	2	10+3	2	0	0
20	FW	(Cameroon) CMR	Oumarou Kaina	9	1	7+2	1	0	0
21	MF	(United States) USA	Victor Garza	6	0	5+1	0	0	0
22	GK	(Armenia) ARM	Karen Israelyan	4	0	4	0	0	0
23	MF	(Peru) PER	Carlo Chueca	11	2	4+7	2	0	0
25	DF	(Armenia) ARM	Ararat Poghosyan	8	0	4+2	0	0+2	0
88	GK	(Armenia) ARM	Levon Minasyan	3	0	3	0	0	0
	DF	(Armenia) ARM	Karen Khachatryan	8	0	3+4	0	1	0
	DF	(Armenia) ARM	Gor Mkrtumyan	3	0	0+3	0	0	0
	MF	(Armenia) ARM	Armen Derdzyan	2	0	1+1	0	0	0
	MF	(Armenia) ARM	Arsen Hovhannisyan	1	0	0+1	0	0	0
Players who left Ararat Yerevan during the season:
1	GK	(Armenia) ARM	Gor Matirosyan	11	0	8+1	0	2	0
3	DF	(Armenia) ARM	Avetis Ghazatyan	11	0	10+1	0	0	0
4	DF	(Serbia) SRB	Čedomir Tomčić	16	2	11+3	2	2	0
5	DF	(Armenia) ARM	Tigran Melikyan	1	0	1	0	0	0
6	DF	(United States) USA	Jamel Wallace	13	1	12	1	1	0
9	FW	(France) FRA	Robin Di Lauro	12	4	8+3	2	1	2
10	FW	(Armenia) ARM	Sergey Amroyan	1	0	0+1	0	0	0
14	MF	(United States) USA	Christian King	15	2	9+4	2	2	0
15	DF	(Armenia) ARM	Armen Durunts	13	0	9+2	0	2	0
17	DF	(Serbia) SRB	Zdravko Kovačević	11	0	8+1	0	2	0
19	FW	(Armenia) ARM	Samvel Hakobyan	1	0	0+1	0	0	0
20	MF	(France) FRA	Zaven Bulut	17	0	14+1	0	2	0
22	GK	(Armenia) ARM	Arman Meliksetyan	4	0	4	0	0	0
23	DF	(Serbia) SRB	Nikola Prebiračević	11	0	10	0	1	0
78	FW	(United States) USA	Darryl Odom	7	0	0+5	0	0+2	0

=== Goal scorers ===
Place	Position	Nation	Number	Name	Premier League	Armenian Cup	Total
1	FW	(Serbia)	7	Aleksandar Rakić	10	0	10
2	MF	(United States)	11	Bryan de la Fuente	4	1	5
3	FW	(France)	9	Robin Di Lauro	2	2	4
4	DF	(Serbia)	4	Čedomir Tomčić	2	0	2
4	MF	(United States)	14	Christian King	2	0	2
4	MF	(United States)	19	Moisés Orozco	2	0	2
4	MF	(Peru)	23	Carlo Chueca	2	0	2
8	DF	(United States)	6	Jamel Wallace	1	0	1
8	FW	(Armenia)	9	Mher Sahakyan	1	0	1
8	MF	(Armenia)	15	Areg Azatyan	1	0	1
8	FW	(Cameroon)	20	Oumarou Kaina	1	0	1
				TOTALS	28	3	31

=== Clean sheets ===
Place	Position	Nation	Number	Name	Premier League	Armenian Cup	Total
1	GK	(Armenia)	1	Gor Matirosyan	1	0	1
1	GK	(Armenia)	22	Karen Israelyan	1	0	1
1	GK	(Armenia)	1	Aram Ayrapetyan	1	0	1
				TOTALS	3	0	3

=== Disciplinary record ===
Number	Nation	Position	Name	Premier League		Armenian Cup		Total	
Number	Nation	Position	Name	Yellow card	Red card	Yellow card	Red card	Yellow card	Red card
1	(Armenia)	GK	Aram Ayrapetyan	2	0	0	0	2	0
2	(Armenia)	DF	Vahe Martirosyan	4	1	0	0	4	1
3	(France)	DF	Nagui Bouras	1	0	0	0	1	0
4	(Serbia)	DF	Čedomir Tomčić	1	0	1	0	2	0
5	(Belgium)	MF	Nikolas Proesmans	7	0	0	0	7	0
6	(Armenia)	DF	David Ghandilyan	1	0	0	0	1	0
7	(Serbia)	FW	Aleksandar Rakić	5	0	0	0	5	0
8	(Armenia)	MF	David G. Grigoryan	3	0	0	0	3	0
11	(United States)	MF	Bryan de la Fuente	4	0	0	0	4	0
14	(Ukraine)	DF	Oleksandr Volchkov	1	0	0	0	1	0
15	(Armenia)	FW	Areg Azatyan	1	0	0	0	1	0
17	(France)	MF	Raffi Kaya	1	0	0	0	1	0
18	(Armenia)	MF	Gorik Khachatryan	1	0	0	0	1	0
19	(United States)	MF	Moisés Orozco	3	0	0	0	3	0
20	(Cameroon)	FW	Oumarou Kaina	2	0	0	0	2	0
22	(Armenia)	GK	Karen Israelyan	1	0	0	0	1	0
23	(Peru)	MF	Carlo Chueca	1	0	0	0	1	0
25	(Armenia)	MF	Ararat Poghosyan	1	0	0	0	1	0
	(Armenia)	MF	Armen Derdzyan	1	0	0	0	1	0
Players who left Ararat Yerevan during the season:
1	(Armenia)	GK	Gor Matirosyan	1	0	0	0	1	0
3	(Armenia)	DF	Avetis Ghazatyan	1	0	0	0	1	0
5	(Armenia)	DF	Tigran Melikyan	1	0	0	0	1	0
6	(United States)	DF	Jamel Wallace	3	0	0	0	3	0
9	(France)	FW	Robin Di Lauro	2	0	0	0	2	0
14	(United States)	MF	Christian King	4	1	0	0	4	1
15	(Armenia)	DF	Armen Durunts	1	0	0	0	1	0
17	(Serbia)	DF	Zdravko Kovačević	0	0	2	1	2	1
20	(France)	MF	Zaven Bulut	3	0	0	0	3	0
23	(Serbia)	DF	Nikola Prebiračević	2	2	0	0	2	2
			TOTALS	59	4	3	1	62	5
