= FC Pyunik in European football =

Overview of FC Pyunik's role in European football

Pyunik in European football
- Club: Pyunik
- Most appearances: Yusuf Otubanjo (30)
- Top scorer: Yusuf Otubanjo (7)
- First entry: 1996–97 UEFA Cup
- Latest entry: 2026–27 UEFA Conference League

Pyunik is an Armenian football club based in Yerevan, Armenia.

== History ==
=== 1990's ===
Pyunik first qualified for European competition in 1996, after their second Armenian Premier League title earned them entry in to the 1996–97 UEFA Cup. Entering at the Preliminary round stage, Pyunik faced HJK Helsinki over two legs in July 1996, defeating them 3–1 at home before losing 5–2 away in Helsinki to be knocked out 5–6 on aggregate. The following season, after winning the league for a third time, Pyunik this time entered into the 1997–98 UEFA Champions League at the First qualifying round, facing Hungarian champions MTK Budapest. MTK Budapest won the first leg 2–0 in Yerevan, before defeating Pyunik 4–3 in Budapest to win 6–3 on aggregate.

=== 2000's ===
After a Five year break, Pyunik returned to European competition in 2002–03, entering the UEFA Champions League after winning the 2001 Armenian Premier League. This started a Ten-year streak for Pyunik in the UEFA Champions League qualifiers, up to the 2011–12 UEFA Champions League.

=== 2010's ===
Pyunik featured in European competitions every year during the 2010s. After two season in the UEFA Champions League at the start of the decade, Pyunik entered the UEFA Europa League for the first time during the 2012–13 season. They would then feature in the UEFA Europa League every season for the remainder of the decade, apart from a singular year in the UEFA Champions League during the 2015–16 season.

=== 2020's ===
After a two-year break from European competition, Pyunik returned to the UEFA Champions League during the 2022–23 season. In the First Qualifying round, Pyunik where drawn against CFR Cluj, where they drew 0–0 at home, and then 2–2 in Romania. The game was still level after extra time, sending the game to penalties where Pyunik won 4–3. In the Second Qualifying round Pyunik then faced F91 Dudelange from Luxembourg, where they were victorious 4–2 on aggregate. Pyunik lost the first leg at home 1–0, but then went on to win 4–1 away in Luxembourg to secure a Third Qualifying round match up against Red Star Belgrade. Pyunik were knocked out of the Champions League by Red Star in the Third Qualifying round, after being defeated 5–0 away in Serbia and 2–0 at home. As a result of their defeat to Red Star Belgrade, Pyunik dropped down in to the UEFA Europa League, where they were drawn with Moldovan Champions Sheriff Tiraspol.

=== Matches ===
As of match played 30 July 2026

Season	Competition	Round	Club	Home	Away	Aggregate
1996–97	UEFA Cup	QR	(Finland) HJK Helsinki	3–1	2–5 (a.e.t.)	5–6
1997–98	UEFA Champions League	1Q	(Hungary) MTK Budapest	0–2	3–4	3–6
2002–03	UEFA Champions League	1Q	(Finland) Tampere United	2–0	4–0	6–0
2002–03	UEFA Champions League	2Q	(Ukraine) Dynamo Kyiv	2–2	0–4	2–6
2003–04	UEFA Champions League	1Q	(Iceland) KR Reykjavík	1–0	1–1	2–1
2003–04	UEFA Champions League	2Q	(Bulgaria) CSKA Sofia	0–2	0–1	0–3
2004–05	UEFA Champions League	1Q	(North Macedonia) Pobeda Prilep	1–1	3–1	4–2
2004–05	UEFA Champions League	2Q	(Ukraine) Shakhtar Donetsk	1–3	0–1	1–4
2005–06	UEFA Champions League	1Q	(Finland) Haka Valkeakoski	2–2	0–1	2–3
2006–07	UEFA Champions League	1Q	(Moldova) Sheriff Tiraspol	0–0	0–2	0–2
2007–08	UEFA Champions League	1Q	(Republic of Ireland) Derry City	2–0	0–0	2–0
2007–08	UEFA Champions League	2Q	(Ukraine) Shakhtar Donetsk	0–2	1–2	1–4
2008–09	UEFA Champions League	1Q	(Cyprus) Anorthosis Famagusta	0–2	0–1	0–3
2009–10	UEFA Champions League	2Q	(Croatia) Dinamo Zagreb	0–0	0–3	0–3
2010–11	UEFA Champions League	2Q	(Serbia) Partizan Belgrade	0–1	1–3	1–4
2011–12	UEFA Champions League	2Q	(Czech Republic) Viktoria Plzeň	0–4	1–5	1–9
2012–13	UEFA Europa League	1Q	(Montenegro) Zeta Golubovci	0–3	2–1	2–4
2013–14	UEFA Europa League	1Q	(North Macedonia) Teteks Tetovo	1–0	1–1	2–1
2013–14	UEFA Europa League	2Q	(Lithuania) Žalgiris Vilnius	1–1	0–2	1–3
2014–15	UEFA Europa League	1Q	(Kazakhstan) Astana	1–4	0–2	1–6
2015–16	UEFA Champions League	1Q	(San Marino) Folgore	2–1	2–1	4–2
2015–16	UEFA Champions League	2Q	(Norway) Molde FK	1–0	0–5	1–5
2016–17	UEFA Europa League	1Q	(Gibraltar) Europa FC	2–1	0–2	2–3
2017–18	UEFA Europa League	1Q	(Slovakia) Slovan Bratislava	1–4	0–5	1–9
2018–19	UEFA Europa League	1Q	(North Macedonia) Vardar	1–0	2–0	3–0
2018–19	UEFA Europa League	2Q	(Kazakhstan) Tobol	1–0	1–2	2–2 (a)
2018–19	UEFA Europa League	3Q	(Israel) Maccabi Tel Aviv	0–0	1–2	1–2
2019–20	UEFA Europa League	1Q	(North Macedonia) Shkupi	3–3	2–1	5–4
2019–20	UEFA Europa League	2Q	(Czech Republic) Jablonec	2–1	0–0	2–1
2019–20	UEFA Europa League	3Q	(England) Wolverhampton Wanderers	0–4	0–4	0–8
2022–23	UEFA Champions League	1Q	(Romania) CFR Cluj	0–0	2–2 (a.e.t.)	2–2 (4–3 p)
2022–23	UEFA Champions League	2Q	(Luxembourg) F91 Dudelange	0–1	4−1	4−2
2022–23	UEFA Champions League	3Q	(Serbia) Red Star Belgrade	0–2	0–5	0–7
2022–23	UEFA Europa League	PO	(Moldova) Sheriff Tiraspol	0–0	0–0	0–0 (2–3 p)
2022–23	UEFA Europa Conference League	Group H	(Switzerland) Basel	1–2	1–3	3rd
2022–23	UEFA Europa Conference League	Group H	(Slovakia) Slovan Bratislava	2−0	1–2	3rd
2022–23	UEFA Europa Conference League	Group H	(Lithuania) Žalgiris	2−0	1–2	3rd
2023–24	UEFA Europa Conference League	1Q	(Estonia) Narva Trans	2−0	3−0	5–0
2023–24	UEFA Europa Conference League	2Q	(Sweden) Kalmar	2−1	2−1	4−2
2023–24	UEFA Europa Conference League	3Q	(Norway) Bodø/Glimt	0–3	0–3	0–6
2024–25	UEFA Champions League	1Q	(Belarus) Dinamo Minsk	0–1	0–0	0–1
2024–25	UEFA Conference League	2Q	(North Macedonia) Struga	3−1	1–2	4−3
2024–25	UEFA Conference League	3Q	(Kazakhstan) Ordabasy	1−0	1−0	2−0
2024–25	UEFA Conference League	PO	(Slovenia) Celje	1−0	1–4	2–4
2025–26	UEFA Conference League	1Q	(San Marino) Tre Fiori	5−0	0–1	5−1
2025–26	UEFA Conference League	2Q	(Hungary) Győri ETO	2−1	1–3	3–4
2026–27	UEFA Conference League	1Q	(Malta) Marsaxlokk	1−0	3−0	4–0
2026–27	UEFA Conference League	2Q	(Hungary) Debrecen	0–0	0–1	0-1

== Player statistics ==
=== Appearances ===
As of match played 30 July 2026

	Name	Years	UEFA Cup	UEFA Champions League	UEFA Europa League	UEFA Europa Conference League	Total	Ratio
1	(Nigeria) Yusuf Otubanjo	2022-2025	(-)	8 (1)	2 (0)	19 (6)	30 (7)	0.23
2	(Russia) Mikhail Kovalenko	2022-	(-)	7 (0)	2 (0)	19 (3)	28 (3)	0.11
3	(Brazil) Juninho	2021-2025	(-)	8 (1)	2 (0)	17 (2)	27 (3)	0.11
3	(Armenia) Hovhannes Harutyunyan	2016-2017, 2021–2024, 2026–	(-)	6 (0)	6 (0)	15 (1)	27 (1)	0.04
5	(Armenia) Sargis Hovsepyan	1992-1997, 2004-2012	2 (0)	22 (0)	2 (0)	(-)	26 (0)	0
6	(Armenia) Artak Dashyan	2022-2024, 2026-	(-)	6 (0)	2 (0)	15 (3)	23 (3)	0.13
7	(Ukraine) Anton Bratkov	2022-2025	(-)	4 (0)	2 (0)	16 (0)	22 (0)	0
7	(Moldova) Eugeniu Cociuc	2022-2024	(-)	8 (0)	2 (0)	11 (2)	22 (2)	0.09
7	(Armenia) Artur Yuspashyan	2007-2016	(-)	12 (0)	9 (0)	(-)	21 (0)	0
7	(Ukraine) Serhiy Vakulenko	2022-	(-)	4 (0)	2 (0)	15 (0)	21 (0)	0
11	(Armenia) Aghvan Mkrtchyan	2002-2006, 2007	(-)	20 (1)	(-)	(-)	20 (1)	0.05
12	(Armenia) David Davidyan (Note: Davidyan was born in Russia, but went on to represent Armenia at international level.)	2022-	(-)	7 (0)	0 (0)	12 (0)	19 (0)	0
13	(Armenia) Levon Pachajyan	2003-2007	(-)	16 (2)	(-)	(-)	16 (2)	0.13
13	(Bosnia and Herzegovina) Luka Juričić (Note: Juričić was born in Germany, but went on to represent Bosnia and Herzegovina at international level.)	2022-2024	(-)	5 (2)	2 (0)	9 (4)	16 (6)	0.38
13	(Armenia) Taron Voskanyan	2010-2016, 2024-2025	(-)	2 (0)	12 (0)	2 (0)	16 (0)	0.06
13	(Armenia) Henri Avagyan	2023-2025, 2025-Present	(-)	2 (0)	0 (0)	14 (0)	16 (0)	0
13	(Brazil) James Santos	2023-2025, 2026-Present	(-)	2 (0)	(-)	14 (1)	16 (1)	0.06
18	(Armenia) Arthur Mkrtchyan	1995-1998, 2001-2004	2 (0)	13 (1)	(-)	(-)	15 (1)	0.07
18	(Armenia) Edgar Malakyan	2007-2012, 2023-	(-)	5 (1)	(-)	10 (0)	15 (1)	0.07
20	(Armenia) Kamo Hovhannisyan	2009-2016	(-)	2 (0)	12 (1)	(-)	14 (1)	0.07
20	(Venezuela) Alexander González	2022	(-)	6 (0)	2 (0)	6 (0)	14 (0)	0
22	(Armenia) Rafael Nazaryan	2001, 2003–2004, 2005-2007	(-)	13 (0)	(-)	(-)	13 (0)	0
22	(Armenia) Varazdat Haroyan	2009-2016	(-)	7 (0)	6 (0)	(-)	13 (0)	0
22	(Armenia) Gagik Poghosyan	2011-2016	(-)	5 (0)	8 (1)	(-)	13 (1)	0.08
22	(Armenia) David Yurchenko (Note: Yurchenko was born in the Turkmen SSR, but went on to represent Armenia at international level.)	2022	(-)	5 (0)	2 (0)	6 (0)	13 (0)	0
22	(Serbia) Aleksandar Miljković	2022-2023, 2025-2026	(-)	(-)	1 (0)	12 (0)	13 (0)	0
27	(Armenia) Karlen Mkrtchyan	2006-2011, 2017-2020	(-)	6 (0)	6 (0)	(-)	12 (0)	0
27	(Armenia) David Manoyan	2008-2012, 2012, 2013-2016	(-)	7 (0)	5 (0)	(-)	12 (0)	0
27	(Russia) Maksim Zhestokov	2018-2020	(-)	(-)	12 (1)	(-)	12 (1)	0.08
27	(Brazil) Alemão	2024-2026	(-)	2 (0)	(-)	10 (1)	12 (1)	0.08
31	(Armenia) Edgar Manucharyan	2002-2005, 2010–2011, 2019	(-)	10 (2)	1 (1)	(-)	11 (3)	0.27
31	(Armenia) Alexander Tadevosyan (Note: Tadevosyan was born in Georgia, but went on to represent Armenia at international level.)	1998, 2003–2006, 2007	(-)	11 (0)	(-)	(-)	11 (0)	0
33	(Armenia) Vardan Minasyan	1992-1998, 2001-2003	2 (0)	(-)	8 (0)	(-)	10 (0)	0
33	(Armenia) Apoula Edel (Note: Edel was born in Cameroon, but went on to represent Armenia at international level.)	2002-2005	(-)	10 (0)	(-)	(-)	10 (0)	0
33	(Armenia) Norayr Sahakyan	2005-2010	(-)	(-)	10 (0)	(-)	10 (0)	0
33	(Armenia) Gevorg Ghazaryan	2006-2011, 2021-2022	(-)	10 (1)	(-)	(-)	10 (1)	0.1
33	(Armenia) Ghukas Poghosyan	2011-2016	(-)	3 (0)	7 (0)	(-)	10 (0)	0
33	(Armenia) Armen Manucharyan	2016-2020	(-)	(-)	10 (0)	(-)	10 (0)	0
33	(Armenia) Alik Arakelyan	2015-2021	(-)	(-)	10 (1)	(-)	10 (1)	0.1
33	(Montenegro) Andrija Dragojević	2018-2020	(-)	(-)	10 (0)	(-)	10 (0)	0
33	(Colombia) Juan Bravo	2023-2024	(-)	2 (0)	(-)	8 (1)	10 (1)	0.1
42	(Armenia) Carl Lombé (Note: Lombé was born in Cameroon, but went on to represent Armenia at international level.)	2003-2005	(-)	9 (0)	(-)	(-)	9 (0)	0
42	(Armenia) Artak Yedigaryan	2007-2012, 2013, 2019-2020	(-)	5 (1)	4 (1)	(-)	9 (2)	0.22
42	(Armenia) Serob Grigoryan (Note: Grigoryan was born in Russia, but went on to represent Armenia at international level.)	2016-2022	(-)	0 (0)	9 (0)	(-)	9 (0)	0
42	(Venezuela) José Caraballo	2023-2024	(-)	2 (0)	(-)	7 (0)	9 (0)	0
42	(Brazil) Lucas Villela	2023-2026	(-)	2 (0)	(-)	7 (1)	9 (1)	0.11
42	(Armenia) Artak Grigoryan	2023-2025	(-)	0 (0)	(-)	9 (0)	9 (0)	0
48	(Argentina) Miguel Cisterna	2002-2004	(-)	8 (1)	(-)	(-)	8 (1)	0.13
48	(Armenia) Artur Yedigaryan	2006-2011, 2012	(-)	8 (0)	(-)	(-)	8 (0)	0
48	(Armenia) Rumyan Hovsepyan	2015, 2018-2019	(-)	4 (0)	4 (0)	(-)	8 (0)	0
48	(Portugal) Martim Maia	2024-2025	(-)	2 (0)	(-)	6 (0)	8 (0)	0
48	(Brazil) Agdon Menezes	2024-2025	(-)	2 (0)	(-)	6 (0)	8 (0)	0
48	(Armenia) Solomon Udo (Note: Udo was born in Nigeria, but went on to represent Armenia at international level.)	2024-Present	(-)	1 (0)	(-)	7 (0)	8 (0)	0
48	(Serbia) Sead Islamović	2025-	(-)	0 (0)	(-)	8 (0)	8 (0)	0
48	(Greece) Nikos Kenourgios	2025-	(-)	0 (0)	(-)	8 (0)	8 (0)	0
48	(Russia) Daniil Kulikov	2025-	(-)	0 (0)	(-)	8 (2)	8 (2)	0.25
57	(Armenia) Arsen Avetisyan	1998, 2006-2008	2 (3)	5 (1)	(-)	(-)	7 (4)	0.57
57	(Armenia) José Bilibio (Note: Bilibio was born in Argentina, but went on to represent Armenia at international level.)	2002-2003	(-)	7 (0)	(-)	(-)	7 (0)	0
57	(Mali) Mamadou Diawara	2001-2005	(-)	7 (2)	(-)	(-)	7 (2)	0.29
57	(Armenia) Robert Arzumanyan	2003-2007	(-)	7 (0)	(-)	(-)	7 (0)	0
57	(Armenia) Grigor Hovhannisyan	2012-2015	(-)	3 (0)	4 (0)	(-)	7 (0)	0
57	(Armenia) Gor Malakyan	2011-2014, 2020-2021	(-)	0 (0)	7 (0)	(-)	7 (0)	0
57	(Armenia) Razmik Hakobyan	2014-2018	(-)	4 (0)	3 (0)	(-)	7 (0)	0
57	(Armenia) Vahagn Hayrapetyan	2016-2019	(-)	(-)	7 (0)	(-)	7 (0)	0
57	(Venezuela) Renzo Zambrano	2022	(-)	6 (0)	1 (0)	(-)	7 (0)	0
57	(Serbia) Uroš Nenadović	2022	(-)	6 (0)	1 (0)	(-)	7 (0)	0
57	(Estonia) Nikita Baranov	2021-2023	(-)	0 (0)	0 (0)	7 (0)	7 (0)	0
57	(Portugal) João Paredes	2024-2025	(-)	2 (0)	(-)	5 (0)	7 (0)	0
57	(Portugal) Filipe Almeida	2025-	(-)	0 (0)	(-)	7 (0)	7 (0)	0
70	(Armenia) Hamlet Mkhitaryan	1996-1998, 2007	2 (1)	4 (0)	(-)	(-)	6 (1)	0.17
70	(Armenia) Zhora Hovhannisyan	2003-2004	(-)	6 (1)	(-)	(-)	6 (1)	0.17
70	(Armenia) Valeri Aleksanyan	2001-2007	(-)	6 (0)	(-)	(-)	6 (0)	0
70	(Armenia) Karen Dokhoyan	2007-2008	(-)	6 (0)	(-)	(-)	6 (0)	0
70	(Armenia) Henrikh Mkhitaryan	2006-2009	(-)	6 (0)	(-)	(-)	6 (0)	0
70	(Armenia) Viulen Ayvazyan	2012-2014	(-)	(-)	6 (3)	(-)	6 (3)	0.5
70	(Armenia) Vaspurak Minasyan	2011-2016, 2021-2022	(-)	(-)	6 (0)	(-)	6 (0)	0
70	(Armenia) Aghvan Papikyan (Note: Papikyan was born in Poland, but went on to represent Armenia at international level.)	2013-2014	(-)	(-)	6 (1)	(-)	6 (1)	0.17
70	(Armenia) Vardges Satumyan	2015-2016	(-)	4 (2)	2 (0)	(-)	6 (2)	0.33
70	(Armenia) Erik Vardanyan	2015-2019, 2021	(-)	(-)	6 (1)	(-)	6 (1)	0.17
70	(Ivory Coast) Mohamed Konaté (Note: Konaté was born in Ivory Coast, but went on to represent Burkina Faso at international level in 2020.)	2018-2019	(-)	(-)	6 (2)	(-)	6 (2)	0.33
70	(Ukraine) Maksym Trusevych	2018-2019	(-)	(-)	6 (0)	(-)	6 (0)	0
70	(Russia) Denis Voynov	2018	(-)	(-)	6 (1)	(-)	6 (1)	0.17
70	(Russia) Vyacheslav Dmitriyev	2018-2019	(-)	(-)	6 (0)	(-)	6 (0)	0
70	(Armenia) Ruslan Koryan (Note: Koryan was born in Russia, but went on to represent Armenia at international level.)	2018	(-)	(-)	6 (1)	(-)	6 (1)	0.17
70	(Armenia) Artyom Simonyan (Note: Simonyan was born in Russia, but went on to represent Armenia at international level.)	2019-2020	(-)	(-)	6 (0)	(-)	6 (0)	0
70	(North Macedonia) Antonio Stankov	2019-2020	(-)	(-)	6 (0)	(-)	6 (0)	0
70	(Armenia) Artur Miranyan (Note: Miranyan was born in Ukraine, but went on to represent Armenia at international level.)	2017, 2019-2020	(-)	(-)	6 (3)	(-)	6 (3)	0.5
70	(Ukraine) Serhiy Shevchuk	2019, 2019-2020	(-)	(-)	6 (0)	(-)	6 (0)	0
70	(Kazakhstan) Gevorg Najaryan (Note: Najaryan was born in Armenia, but went on to represent Kazakhstan at international level.)	2022	(-)	6 (0)	0 (0)	(-)	6 (0)	0
70	(Senegal) Dame Diop	2022	(-)	(-)	0 (0)	6 (0)	6 (0)	0
70	(Armenia) Stanislav Buchnev (Note: Buchnev was born in Russia, but went on to represent Armenia at international level.)	2020-	(-)	0 (0)	1 (0)	5 (0)	6 (0)	0
92	(Armenia) Hovhannes Antonyan	2002-2005	(-)	5 (0)	(-)	(-)	5 (0)	0
92	(Armenia) Balep Ba Ndoumbouk (Note: Ndoumbouk was born in Cameroon, but went on to represent Armenia at international level.)	2003-2004	(-)	5 (0)	(-)	(-)	5 (0)	0
92	(Armenia) Galust Petrosyan	2003-2004	(-)	5 (1)	(-)	(-)	5 (1)	0.2
92	(Armenia) Gevorg Kasparov	2005-2006	(-)	5 (0)	(-)	(-)	5 (0)	0
92	(Armenia) Arman Hovhannisyan	2010-2014	(-)	(-)	5 (0)	(-)	5 (0)	0
92	(Armenia) Gor Manukyan	2012-2018	(-)	(-)	5 (0)	(-)	5 (0)	0
92	(Armenia) Narek Aslanyan	2012-2018	(-)	(-)	5 (0)	(-)	5 (0)	0
92	(Armenia) Petros Avetisyan	2016, 2017-2018	(-)	(-)	5 (1)	(-)	5 (1)	0.2
92	(Ivory Coast) Didier Kadio	2017-2018	(-)	(-)	5 (0)	(-)	5 (0)	0
92	(Russia) Stanislav Yefimov	2019	(-)	(-)	5 (0)	(-)	5 (0)	0
92	(Albania) Kristi Marku	2019-2020	(-)	(-)	5 (0)	(-)	5 (0)	0
92	(Serbia) Zoran Gajić	2021-2022	(-)	4 (2)	1 (0)	(-)	5 (2)	0.4
92	(Serbia) Nemanja Mladenović	2022	(-)	5 (0)	0 (0)	(-)	5 (0)	0
92	(Armenia) Yuri Gareginyan	2022-2023	(-)	3 (0)	1 (0)	1 (0)	5 (0)	0
92	(Armenia) Aleksandr Karapetyan (Note: Karapetyan was born in Georgian SSR, but went on to represent Armenia at international level.)	2022	(-)	(-)	0 (0)	5 (0)	5 (0)	0
92	(Brazil) Vagner Gonçalves	2023-2026	(-)	0 (0)	2 (0)	3 (0)	5 (0)	0
92	(Armenia) Sargis Metoyan	2025-	(-)	0 (0)	(-)	5 (0)	5 (0)	0
109	(Armenia) Seyran Poghosyan	1996-1999	2 (0)	2 (0)	(-)	(-)	4 (0)	0
109	(Armenia) Varazdat Avetisyan	1992-1999, 2002	2 (0)	2 (0)	(-)	(-)	4 (0)	0
109	(Armenia) Armen Sanamyan	1993-1997, 2001	2 (0)	2 (2)	(-)	(-)	4 (2)	0.5
109	(Armenia) Gegam Hovanisyan	1996-1998	2 (0)	2 (0)	(-)	(-)	4 (0)	0
109	(Armenia) Romik Khachatryan	1997-1998, 2006	(-)	4 (0)	(-)	(-)	4 (0)	0
109	(Russia) Andronik Karagezyan	2002	(-)	4 (0)	(-)	(-)	4 (0)	0
109	(Mali) Alou Traoré	2001-2003	(-)	4 (0)	(-)	(-)	4 (0)	0
109	(Armenia) Artavazd Karamyan	1997-1998, 2001-2002	(-)	4 (2)	(-)	(-)	4 (2)	0.5
109	(Armenia) Arman Karamyan	1997-1998, 2001-2002	(-)	4 (3)	(-)	(-)	4 (3)	0.75
109	(Armenia) Marian Zeciu (Note: Zeciu was born in Romania, but went on to represent Armenia at international level.)	2003-2004	(-)	4 (0)	(-)	(-)	4 (0)	0
109	(Armenia) Eduard Partsikyan (Note: Partsikyan was born in Russia, but went on to represent Armenia at international level.)	2003-2004, 2005	(-)	4 (0)	(-)	(-)	4 (0)	0
109	(Armenia) Armen Tigranyan	2005-2007	(-)	4 (0)	(-)	(-)	4 (0)	0
109	(Armenia) Karen Khachatryan	2008-2010	(-)	4 (0)	(-)	(-)	4 (0)	0
109	(Armenia) Marcos Pizzelli (Note: Pizzelli was born in Brazil, but went on to represent Armenia at international level.)	2009-2011	(-)	4 (0)	(-)	(-)	4 (0)	0
109	(Armenia) Hovhannes Hovhannisyan	2011-2016	(-)	2 (0)	2 (0)	(-)	4 (0)	0
109	(Armenia) Sarkis Baloyan (Note: Baloyan was born in Russia, but went on to represent Armenia national under-21 football team at international level.)	2013-2014	(-)	(-)	4 (0)	(-)	4 (0)	0
109	(Armenia) Ashot Sardaryan	2013-2014	(-)	(-)	4 (0)	(-)	4 (0)	0
109	(Armenia) Anatoliy Ayvazov	2014-2016	(-)	4 (0)	(-)	(-)	4 (0)	0
109	(Armenia) Zaven Badoyan	2015	(-)	4 (1)	(-)	(-)	4 (1)	0.25
109	(Armenia) Levon Hayrapetyan	2010, 2015–2016, 2017-2018	(-)	4 (0)	(-)	(-)	4 (0)	0
109	(Nigeria) John Jeremiah	2015	(-)	4 (0)	(-)	(-)	4 (0)	0
109	(Armenia) Artur Kartashyan	2015-2021	(-)	(-)	4 (0)	(-)	4 (0)	0
109	(Armenia) Robert Hakobyan	2014-2021	(-)	(-)	4 (0)	(-)	4 (0)	0
109	(Nigeria) Steven Alfred	2019-2020, 2020	(-)	(-)	4 (0)	(-)	4 (0)	0
109	(North Macedonia) Marjan Radeski	2022	(-)	2 (0)	2 (0)	(-)	4 (0)	0
109	(Ukraine) Roman Karasyuk	2022-2023	(-)	(-)	0 (0)	4 (0)	4 (0)	0
109	(North Macedonia) Stefan Spirovski	2022-2023	(-)	0 (0)	0 (0)	4 (0)	4 (0)	0
109	(Ivory Coast) Serges Déblé	2022, 2024-2025	(-)	0 (0)	(-)	4 (1)	4 (1)	0.25
109	(Cameroon) Marius Noubissi	2025-2026	(-)	0 (0)	(-)	4 (2)	4 (2)	0.5
109	(Spain) Javi Moreno	2025-2026	(-)	0 (0)	(-)	4 (0)	4 (0)	0
109	(Armenia) Gevorg Tarakhchyan	2025-	(-)	0 (0)	(-)	4 (0)	4 (0)	0
109	(Armenia) Karlen Hovhannisyan	2023-	(-)	(-)	(-)	4 (0)	4 (0)	0
109	(Guinea) Momo Yansané	2023-	(-)	(-)	(-)	4 (1)	4 (1)	0.25
109	(Cyprus) Iasonas Pikis	2026-	(-)	(-)	(-)	4 (0)	4 (0)	0
143	(Armenia) Aramayis Tonoyan	1996-1997	2 (0)	1 (0)	(0)	(-)	3 (0)	0
143	(Armenia) Suren Chakhalyan	1992-1998, 1998	1 (0)	2 (0)	(0)	(-)	3 (0)	0
143	(Serbia) Aleksandar Stefanović	2002-2003	(-)	3 (0)	(0)	(-)	3 (0)	0
143	(Armenia) Arkadi Chilingaryan	2002-2003	(-)	3 (0)	(0)	(-)	3 (0)	0
143	(Armenia) Arsen Meloyan	2001-2003	(-)	3 (0)	(0)	(-)	3 (0)	0
143	(Argentina) Juan Pablo Peralta	2003	(-)	3 (0)	(0)	(-)	3 (0)	0
143	(Armenia) Tigran Davtyan	2003-2006	(-)	3 (0)	(0)	(-)	3 (0)	0
143	(Armenia) Artur Voskanyan	2004-2006	(-)	3 (0)	(0)	(-)	3 (0)	0
143	(Armenia) Vardan Petrosyan	2005-2009	(-)	3 (0)	(0)	(-)	3 (0)	0
143	(Armenia) Tigran Gharabaghtsyan	2006-2008	(-)	3 (0)	(0)	(-)	3 (0)	0
143	(Armenia) Vahagn Minasyan	2009-2010	(-)	3 (0)	(0)	(-)	3 (0)	0
143	(Armenia) Artak Aleksanyan	2009-2010, 2011	(-)	3 (0)	(0)	(-)	3 (0)	0
143	(Armenia) Davit Minasyan	2011-2013, 2014	(-)	1 (0)	2 (0)	(-)	3 (0)	0
143	(Armenia) Vardan Bakalyan	2011-2015	(-)	1 (0)	2 (0)	(-)	3 (0)	0
143	(Armenia) Albert Ohanyan	2012-2014	(-)	(-)	3 (0)	(-)	3 (0)	0
143	(Armenia) Davit Zakaryan	2012-2014	(-)	(-)	3 (0)	(-)	3 (0)	0
143	(United States) César Romero	2014-2015	(-)	3 (1)	(-)	(-)	3 (1)	0.33
143	(Armenia) Robert Minasyan	2014-2019	(-)	(-)	3 (1)	(-)	3 (1)	0.33
143	(Russia) Yevgeni Kobozev	2018-2019	(-)	(-)	3 (0)	(-)	3 (0)	0
143	(Russia) Albert Bogatyryov	2018	(-)	(-)	3 (0)	(-)	3 (0)	0
143	(Armenia) Grenik Petrosyan	2022-2024	(-)	(-)	0 (0)	3 (0)	3 (0)	0
143	(Armenia) Aras Özbiliz (Note: Özbiliz was born in Turkey, but went on to represent Armenia at international level.)	2019-2022	(-)	0 (0)	0 (0)	3 (1)	3 (1)	0.33
143	(Nigeria) Taofiq Jibril	2023-2024	(-)	0 (0)	(-)	3 (0)	3 (0)	0
143	(Armenia) Daniyel Agbalyan	2025-2026	(-)	0 (0)	(-)	3 (0)	3 (0)	0
143	(Lithuania) Matas Vareika	2025-2026	(-)	0 (0)	(-)	3 (0)	3 (0)	0
143	(Armenia) Robert Darbinyan	2021, 2026-	(-)	(-)	(-)	3 (0)	3 (0)	0
143	(Netherlands) Iman Griffith	2026-	(-)	(-)	(-)	3 (0)	3 (0)	0
170	(Armenia) Harutyun Abrahamyan	1996-1997	2 (0)	(-)	(-)	(-)	2 (0)	0
170	(Armenia) Vardan Khachatryan	1995-1997	2 (0)	(-)	(-)	(-)	2 (0)	0
170	(Armenia) Hayk Markaryan	1996-1997	2 (0)	(-)	(-)	(-)	2 (0)	0
170	(Armenia) Armen Avagyan	1995-1998	(-)	2 (0)	(-)	(-)	2 (0)	0
170	(Armenia) Hayk Gevorgyan	1996-2000	(-)	2 (0)	(-)	(-)	2 (0)	0
170	(Armenia) Armen Shahgeldyan	1996-1997	(-)	2 (1)	(-)	(-)	2 (1)	0.5
170	(Argentina) Fernando Zagharián	2002	(-)	2 (0)	(-)	(-)	2 (0)	0
170	(Armenia) Mkhitar Grigoryan	2003-2006	(-)	2 (0)	(-)	(-)	2 (0)	0
170	(Armenia) Boris Melkonyan	2006-2007	(-)	2 (0)	(-)	(-)	2 (0)	0
170	(Armenia) Aleksandr Petrosyan	2002-2007	(-)	2 (0)	(-)	(-)	2 (0)	0
170	(Cameroon) Felix Hzeina	2007-2008	(-)	2 (0)	(-)	(-)	2 (0)	0
170	(Uruguay) Ignacio Bordad	2006-2007	(-)	2 (0)	(-)	(-)	2 (0)	0
170	(Armenia) Artak Andrikyan	2007-2010	(-)	2 (0)	(-)	(-)	2 (0)	0
170	(Armenia) Grigor Meliksetyan	2007-2009, 2021-2022	(-)	2 (0)	(-)	(-)	2 (0)	0
170	(Armenia) Albert Tadevosyan	2009-2010	(-)	2 (0)	(-)	(-)	2 (0)	0
170	(Armenia) Edvard Hovhannisyan	2009-2011	(-)	2 (0)	(-)	(-)	2 (0)	0
170	(Zambia) Emmanuel Mbola	2009-2010	(-)	2 (0)	(-)	(-)	2 (0)	0
170	(Nigeria) Yinka Adedeji	2010	(-)	2 (0)	(-)	(-)	2 (0)	0
170	(Armenia) Hovhannes Goharyan	2010	(-)	2 (0)	(-)	(-)	2 (0)	0
170	(Armenia) Karen Israelyan	2010-2011	(-)	2 (0)	(-)	(-)	2 (0)	0
170	(Armenia) Aram Shakhnazaryan	2016-2018	(-)	(-)	2 (0)	(-)	2 (0)	0
170	(Armenia) Vardan Pogosyan	2015, 2016-2017	(-)	(-)	2 (0)	(-)	2 (0)	0
170	(Armenia) Hovhannes Poghosyan	2013-2020	(-)	(-)	2 (0)	(-)	2 (0)	0
170	(Armenia) Hovhannes Nazaryan	2016-2018	(-)	(-)	2 (0)	(-)	2 (0)	0
170	(Russia) Vitali Stezhko	2018-2019	(-)	(-)	2 (0)	(-)	2 (0)	0
170	(Russia) Sergei Kolychev	2018-2019	(-)	(-)	2 (0)	(-)	2 (0)	0
170	(Russia) Aleksandr Galimov	2019	(-)	(-)	2 (0)	(-)	2 (0)	0
170	(North Macedonia) Denis Mahmudov	2019-2020	(-)	(-)	2 (0)	(-)	2 (0)	0
170	(Armenia) Arthur Avagyan	2022-2023	(-)	2 (0)	0 (0)	(-)	2 (0)	0
170	(Brazil) André Mensalão	2022	(-)	2 (0)	0 (0)	(-)	2 (0)	0
170	(Armenia) Levon Vardanyan	2019-	(-)	0 (0)	(-)	2 (0)	2 (0)	0
170	(Brazil) Ravanelli	2023-2024	(-)	0 (0)	(-)	2 (0)	2 (0)	0
170	(Armenia) Erik Simonyan	2026-	(-)	(-)	(-)	2 (0)	2 (0)	0
170	(Mozambique) Witi	2026-	(-)	(-)	(-)	2 (0)	2 (0)	0
204	(Armenia) Edgar Gasparyan	2005-2008	(-)	1 (0)	(-)	(-)	1 (0)	0
204	(Armenia) Rafael Safaryan	2003-2007	(-)	1 (0)	(-)	(-)	1 (0)	0
204	(Armenia) Mauro Guevgeozián (Note: Guevgeozián was born in Uruguay, but went on to represent Armenia at international level.)	2007	(-)	1 (0)	(-)	(-)	1 (0)	0
204	(Armenia) Hayk Chilingaryan	2006-2010	(-)	1 (0)	(-)	(-)	1 (0)	0
204	(Armenia) Artur Barseghyan	2010-2011	(-)	1 (0)	(-)	(-)	1 (0)	0
204	(Armenia) Mihran Manasyan	2007-2010	(-)	1 (0)	(-)	(-)	1 (0)	0
204	(Belarus) Artur Lesko	2010	(-)	1 (0)	(-)	(-)	1 (0)	0
204	(Armenia) Arman Melkonyan	2012	(-)	(-)	1 (0)	(-)	1 (0)	0
204	(Armenia) Artur Grigoryan	2012-2014, 2020-2021	(-)	(-)	1 (0)	(-)	1 (0)	0
204	(Armenia) Eduard Tatoyan (Note: Sturki was born in Russia, but went on to represent Armenia at international level. In 2014, he changed his name from Eduard Tatoyan in Eduard Sturki.)	2012	(-)	(-)	1 (1)	(-)	1 (1)	1
204	(Armenia) Artur Harutyunyan	2006, 2014	(-)	(-)	1 (0)	(-)	1 (0)	0
204	(Armenia) Sargis Shahinyan	2015-2016	(-)	1 (0)	(-)	(-)	1 (0)	0
204	(Armenia) Erik Petrosyan	2016-2018	(-)	(-)	1 (0)	(-)	1 (0)	0
204	(Armenia) Hovhannes Panosyan	2016-2017	(-)	(-)	1 (0)	(-)	1 (0)	0
204	(Armenia) Valeriy Voskonyan	2016-2018	(-)	(-)	1 (0)	(-)	1 (0)	0
204	(Guinea-Bissau) Bacar Baldé	2018	(-)	(-)	1 (2)	(-)	1 (2)	2
204	(Montenegro) Marko Burzanović	2019-2020	(-)	(-)	1 (0)	(-)	1 (0)	0
204	(Russia) Anton Belov	2019-2020	(-)	(-)	1 (0)	(-)	1 (0)	0
204	(Ukraine) Alan Aussi	2022-2023	(-)	0 (0)	1 (0)	(-)	1 (0)	0
204	(Serbia) Boris Varga	2022	(-)	0 (0)	1 (0)	(-)	1 (0)	0
204	(Nigeria) Sani Buhari	2024-2026	(-)	0 (0)	(-)	1 (1)	1 (1)	1
204	(Ghana) Eric Ocansey	2025-2026	(-)	0 (0)	(-)	1 (1)	1 (1)	1
204	(Armenia) Vyacheslav Afyan	2026-	(-)	(-)	(-)	1 (0)	1 (0)	0

=== Goalscorers ===
As of match played 30 July 2026

	Name	Years	UEFA Cup	UEFA Champions League	UEFA Europa League	UEFA Europa Conference League	Total	Ratio
1	(Nigeria) Yusuf Otubanjo	2022-2025	(-)	1 (8)	0 (2)	4 (19)	7 (30)	0.23
2	(Bosnia and Herzegovina) Luka Juričić	2022-2024	(-)	2 (5)	0 (2)	4 (9)	6 (16)	0.38
3	(Armenia) Artak Dashyan	2022-2024	(-)	0 (6)	0 (2)	5 (13)	5 (21)	0.24
4	(Armenia) Arsen Avetisyan	1998, 2006-2008	3 (2)	1 (5)	(-)	(-)	4 (7)	0.57
5	(Armenia) Arman Karamyan	1997-1998, 2001-2002	(-)	3 (4)	(-)	(-)	3 (4)	0.75
5	(Armenia) Edgar Manucharyan	2002-2005, 2010–2011, 2019	(-)	2 (10)	1 (1)	(-)	3 (11)	0.27
5	(Armenia) Viulen Ayvazyan	2012-2014	(-)	(-)	3 (6)	(-)	3 (6)	0.5
5	(Armenia) Artur Miranyan	2017, 2019-2020	(-)	(-)	3 (6)	(-)	3 (6)	0.5
5	(Brazil) Juninho	2021-2025	(-)	1 (8)	0 (2)	2 (16)	3 (27)	0.11
5	(Russia) Mikhail Kovalenko	2022-	(-)	0 (7)	0 (2)	3 (19)	3 (28)	0.11
11	(Armenia) Armen Sanamyan	1993-1997, 2001	0 (2)	2 (2)	(-)	(-)	2 (4)	0.5
11	(Armenia) Artavazd Karamyan	1997-1998, 2001-2002	(-)	2 (4)	(-)	(-)	2 (4)	0.5
11	(Mali) Mamadou Diawara	2001-2005	(-)	2 (7)	(-)	(-)	2 (7)	0.29
11	(Armenia) Levon Pachajyan	2003-2007	(-)	2 (16)	(-)	(-)	2 (16)	0.13
11	(Armenia) Artak Yedigaryan	2007-2012, 2013, 2019-2020	(-)	1 (5)	1 (4)	(-)	2 (9)	0.22
11	(Armenia) Vardges Satumyan	2015-2016	(-)	2 (4)	0 (2)	(-)	2 (6)	0.33
11	(Ivory Coast) Mohamed Konaté	2018-2019	(-)	(-)	2 (6)	(-)	2 (6)	0.33
11	(Guinea-Bissau) Bacar Baldé	2018	(-)	(-)	2 (1)	(-)	2 (1)	2
11	(Serbia) Zoran Gajić	2021-2022	(-)	2 (4)	0 (1)	(-)	2 (5)	0.4
11	(Moldova) Eugeniu Cociuc	2022-2023, 2024	(-)	0 (8)	0 (2)	2 (12)	2 (22)	0.09
11	(Cameroon) Marius Noubissi	2025-2026	(-)	0 (0)	(-)	2 (4)	2 (4)	0.5
11	(Russia) Daniil Kulikov	2025-	(-)	0 (0)	(-)	2 (7)	2 (7)	0.29
23	(Armenia) Arthur Mkrtchyan	1995-1998, 2001-2004	0 (2)	1 (13)	(-)	(-)	1 (15)	0.07
23	(Armenia) Hamlet Mkhitaryan	1996-1998, 2007	1 (2)	0 (4)	(-)	(-)	1 (6)	0.17
23	(Armenia) Armen Shahgeldyan	1996-1997	(-)	1 (2)	(-)	(-)	1 (2)	0.5
23	(Argentina) Miguel Cisterna	2002-2004	(-)	1 (8)	(-)	(-)	1 (8)	0.13
23	(Armenia) Aghvan Mkrtchyan	2002-2006, 2007	(-)	1 (20)	(-)	(-)	1 (20)	0.05
23	(Armenia) Zhora Hovhannisyan	2003-2004	(-)	1 (6)	(-)	(-)	1 (6)	0.17
23	(Armenia) Galust Petrosyan	2003-2004	(-)	1 (5)	(-)	(-)	1 (5)	0.2
23	(Armenia) Gevorg Ghazaryan	2006-2011, 2021-2022	(-)	1 (10)	(-)	(-)	1 (10)	0.1
23	(Armenia) Edgar Malakyan	2007-2012	(-)	1 (5)	(-)	(-)	1 (5)	0.2
23	(Armenia) Gagik Poghosyan	2011-2016	(-)	0 (5)	1 (8)	(-)	1 (13)	0.08
23	(Armenia) Kamo Hovhannisyan	2009-2016	(-)	0 (2)	1 (12)	(-)	1 (14)	0.07
23	(Armenia) Eduard Tatoyan	2012	(-)	(-)	1 (1)	(-)	1 (1)	1
23	(Armenia) Aghvan Papikyan	2013-2014	(-)	(-)	1 (6)	(-)	1 (6)	0.17
23	(United States) César Romero	2014-2015	(-)	1 (3)	(-)	(-)	1 (3)	0.33
23	(Armenia) Zaven Badoyan	2015	(-)	1 (4)	(-)	(-)	1 (4)	0.25
23	(Armenia) Alik Arakelyan	2015-2021	(-)	(-)	1 (10)	(-)	1 (10)	0.1
23	(Armenia) Robert Minasyan	2014-2019	(-)	(-)	1 (3)	(-)	1 (3)	0.33
23	(Armenia) Petros Avetisyan	2016, 2017-2018	(-)	(-)	1 (5)	(-)	1 (5)	0.2
23	(Armenia) Erik Vardanyan	2015-2019, 2021	(-)	(-)	1 (6)	(-)	1 (6)	0.17
23	(Russia) Denis Voynov	2018	(-)	(-)	1 (6)	(-)	1 (6)	0.17
23	(Russia) Maksim Zhestokov	2018-2020	(-)	(-)	1 (12)	(-)	1 (12)	0.08
23	(Armenia) Ruslan Koryan	2018	(-)	(-)	1 (6)	(-)	1 (6)	0.17
23	(Armenia) Aras Özbiliz	2019-2022	(-)	0 (0)	0 (0)	1 (3)	1 (3)	0.33
23	(Brazil) James Santos	2023-2025	(-)	0 (2)	(-)	1 (12)	1 (14)	0.07
23	(Colombia) Juan Bravo	2023-2024	(-)	0 (2)	(-)	1 (8)	1 (10)	0.1
23	(Armenia) Hovhannes Harutyunyan	2016-2017, 2021-2024	(-)	0 (6)	0 (6)	1 (11)	1 (23)	0.04
23	(Brazil) Lucas Villela	2023-2026	(-)	0 (2)	(-)	1 (7)	1 (9)	0.11
23	(Ivory Coast) Serges Déblé	2022, 2024-2025	(-)	0 (0)	(-)	1 (4)	1 (4)	0.25
23	(Nigeria) Sani Buhari	2024-2026	(-)	0 (0)	(-)	1 (1)	1 (1)	1
23	(Brazil) Alemão	2024-2026	(-)	0 (2)	(-)	1 (10)	1 (12)	0.08
23	(Ghana) Eric Ocansey	2025-2026	(-)	0 (0)	(-)	1 (1)	1 (1)	1
23	(Guinea) Momo Yansané	2026-	(-)	(-)	(-)	1 (4)	1 (4)	0.25
23	Own goal	1996-	0 (2)	0 (42)	0 (26)	1 (26)	1 (96)	0.01

=== Clean sheets ===
As of match played 30 July 2026

	Name	Years	UEFA Cup	UEFA Champions League	UEFA Europa League	UEFA Conference League	Total	Ratio
1	(Armenia) Henri Avagyan	2023–2025, 2025–Present	(-)	1 (2)	(-)	7 (14)	8 (16)	0.5
1	(Armenia) David Yurchenko	2022	(-)	1 (5)	2 (2)	2 (6)	5 (13)	0.38
3	(Montenegro) Andrija Dragojević	2018-2020	(-)	(-)	4 (10)	(-)	4 (10)	0.4
4	(Armenia) Gevorg Kasparov	2005-2006	(-)	3 (5)	(-)	(-)	3 (5)	0.6
5	(Russia) Andronik Karagezyan	2002	(-)	2 (4)	(-)	(-)	2 (4)	0.5
5	(Armenia) Stanislav Buchnev	2020–Present	(-)	0 (1)	(-)	2 (6)	2 (7)	0.29
7	(Armenia) Apoula Edel	2002-2005	(-)	1 (10)	(-)	(-)	1 (10)	0.1
7	(Armenia) Edvard Hovhannisyan	2007-2011	(-)	1 (2)	(-)	(-)	1 (2)	0.5
7	(Armenia) Gor Manukyan	2012-2019	(-)	(-)	1 (7)	(-)	1 (7)	0.14
7	(Armenia) Anatoliy Ayvazov	2014-2016	(-)	1 (4)	(-)	(-)	1 (4)	0.25
7	(Russia) Yevgeni Kobozev	2018-2019	(-)	(-)	1 (3)	(-)	1 (3)	0.33
12	(Armenia) Harutyun Abrahamyan	1996	0 (2)	0 (0)	(-)	(-)	0 (2)	0
12	(Armenia) Armen Avagyan	1995-1997	0 (0)	0 (2)	(-)	(-)	0 (2)	0
12	(Armenia) Edgar Gasparyan	2005-2008	0 (0)	0 (1)	(-)	(-)	0 (1)	0
12	(Uruguay) Ignacio Bordad	2006-2007	(-)	0 (2)	(-)	(-)	0 (2)	0
12	(Armenia) Grigor Meliksetyan	2007-2009, 2021-2022	(-)	0 (2)	(-)	(-)	0 (2)	0
12	(Belarus) Artur Lesko	2010	(-)	0 (2)	(-)	(-)	0 (2)	0
12	(Armenia) Karen Israelyan	2010-2011	(-)	0 (2)	(-)	(-)	0 (2)	0
12	(Armenia) Albert Ohanyan	2012-2015	(-)	(-)	0 (3)	(-)	0 (3)	0
12	(Armenia) Artur Harutyunyan	2014	(-)	(-)	0 (1)	(-)	0 (1)	0
12	(Ukraine) Valeriy Voskonyan	2016-2018	(-)	(-)	0 (1)	(-)	0 (1)	0

Kobozev & Dragojević both played in Pyuniks's 2-0 win over Vardar on 19 July 2018

== Overall record ==
=== By competition ===
As of match played 30 July 2026

Competition	GP	W	D	L	GF	GA	+/-
UEFA Champions League	42	9	10	23	36	69	–33
UEFA Europa League / UEFA Cup	28	9	7	12	27	48	–21
UEFA Conference League	26	14	1	11	37	31	+6
Total	96	32	18	46	100	148	−48

=== By country ===
As of match played 30 July 2026

Country	Pld	W	D	L	GF	GA	GD	Win%
Bulgaria	2	0	0	2	0	3	−3	0.00
Belarus	2	0	1	1	0	1	−1	0.00
Croatia	2	0	1	1	0	3	−3	0.00
Czech Republic	4	1	1	2	3	10	−7	25.00
Cyprus	2	0	0	2	0	3	−3	0.00
England	2	0	0	2	0	8	−8	0.00
Estonia	2	2	0	0	5	0	+5	100.00
Finland	6	3	1	2	13	9	+4	50.00
Gibraltar	2	1	0	1	2	3	−1	50.00
Hungary	6	1	1	4	6	11	−5	16.67
Iceland	2	1	1	0	2	1	+1	50.00
Ireland	2	1	1	0	2	0	+2	50.00
Israel	2	0	1	1	1	2	−1	0.00
Kazakhstan	6	3	0	3	5	8	−3	50.00
Lithuania	4	1	1	2	4	5	−1	25.00
Luxembourg	2	1	0	1	4	2	+2	50.00
Malta	2	2	0	0	4	0	+4	100.00
Moldova	4	0	3	1	0	2	−2	0.00
Montenegro	2	1	0	1	2	4	−2	50.00
North Macedonia	10	6	3	1	18	10	+8	60.00
Norway	4	1	0	3	1	11	−10	25.00
Romania	2	0	2	0	2	2	+0	0.00
San Marino	4	3	0	1	9	3	+6	75.00
Serbia	4	0	0	4	1	11	−10	0.00
Slovakia	4	1	0	3	4	11	−7	25.00
Slovenia	2	1	0	1	2	4	−2	50.00
Sweden	2	2	0	0	4	2	+2	100.00
Switzerland	2	0	0	2	2	5	−3	0.00
Ukraine	6	0	1	5	4	14	−10	0.00

=== By club ===
As of match played 30 July 2026

Opponent	Played	Won	Drawn	Lost	For	Against	Difference	Ratio
(Cyprus) Anorthosis Famagusta	2	0	0	2	0	3	−3	0.00
(Kazakhstan) Astana	2	0	0	2	1	6	−5	0.00
(Switzerland) Basel	2	0	0	2	2	5	−3	0.00
(Norway) Bodø/Glimt	2	0	0	2	0	6	−6	0.00
(Slovenia) Celje	2	1	0	1	2	4	−2	50.00
(Romania) Cluj	2	0	2	0	2	2	+0	0.00
(Bulgaria) CSKA Sofia	2	0	0	2	0	3	−3	0.00
(Hungary) Debrecen	2	0	1	1	0	1	−1	0.00
(Republic of Ireland) Derry City	2	1	1	0	2	0	+2	50.00
(Belarus) Dinamo Minsk	2	0	1	1	0	1	−1	0.00
(Croatia) Dinamo Zagreb	2	0	1	1	0	3	−3	0.00
(Ukraine) Dynamo Kyiv	2	0	1	1	2	6	−4	0.00
(Gibraltar) Europa	2	1	0	1	2	3	−1	50.00
(Luxembourg) F91 Dudelange	2	1	0	1	4	2	+2	50.00
(San Marino) Folgore	2	2	0	0	4	2	+2	100.00
(Hungary) Győri	2	1	0	1	3	4	−1	50.00
(Finland) Haka	2	0	1	1	2	3	−1	0.00
(Finland) HJK Helsinki	2	1	0	1	5	6	−1	50.00
(Czech Republic) Jablonec	2	1	1	0	2	1	+1	50.00
(Sweden) Kalmar	2	2	0	0	4	2	+2	100.00
(Iceland) KR Reykjavík	2	1	1	0	2	1	+1	50.00
(Israel) Maccabi Tel Aviv	2	0	1	1	1	2	−1	0.00
(Malta) Marsaxlokk	2	2	0	0	4	0	+4	100.00
(Norway) Molde	2	1	0	1	1	5	−4	50.00
(Hungary) MTK Budapest	2	0	0	2	3	6	−3	0.00
(Estonia) Narva Trans	2	2	0	0	5	0	+5	100.00
(Kazakhstan) Ordabasy	2	2	0	0	2	0	+2	100.00
(Serbia) Partizan	2	0	0	2	1	4	−3	0.00
(North Macedonia) Pobeda	2	1	1	0	4	2	+2	50.00
(Serbia) Red Star Belgrade	2	0	0	2	0	7	−7	0.00
(Ukraine) Shakhtar Donetsk	4	0	0	4	2	8	−6	0.00
(Moldova) Sheriff Tiraspol	4	0	3	1	0	2	−2	0.00
(North Macedonia) Shkupi	2	1	1	0	5	4	+1	50.00
(Slovakia) Slovan Bratislava	4	1	0	3	4	11	−7	25.00
(North Macedonia) Struga	2	1	0	1	4	3	+1	50.00
(Finland) Tampere United	2	2	0	0	6	0	+6	100.00
(North Macedonia) Teteks	2	1	1	0	2	1	+1	50.00
(Kazakhstan) Tobol	2	1	0	1	2	2	+0	50.00
(San Marino) Tre Fiori	2	1	0	1	5	1	+4	50.00
(North Macedonia) Vardar	2	2	0	0	3	0	+3	100.00
(Czech Republic) Viktoria Plzeň	2	0	0	2	1	9	−8	0.00
(England) Wolverhampton Wanderers	2	0	0	2	0	8	−8	0.00
(Lithuania) Žalgiris	4	1	1	2	4	5	−1	25.00
(Montenegro) Zeta	2	1	0	1	2	4	−2	50.00
