= 2024 EMF EURO =

Tournament details
- Host country: Bosnia and Herzegovina
- Dates: 1–8 June
- Teams: 24
- Venue: 1 (in 1 host city)

Final positions
- Champions: Serbia (1st title)
- Runners-up: Romania
- Third place: Kazakhstan
- Fourth place: France

Tournament statistics
- Top scorer: (Montenegro) Rijad Dervišević (7 goals)

The 2024 EMF Euro is the eleventh edition of the EMF EURO for national small-sided football teams, and the sixth governed by the European Minifootball Federation. It takes place in Skenderija in Sarajevo, Bosnia and Herzegovina, from 1 to 8 June 2024.

The final tournament includes 24 teams. The group draw took place on 4 April 2024 in studio of Hayat TV.

== Group stage ==
=== Group A ===
Pos	Team	Pld	W	D	L	GF	GA	GD	Pts	
1	Montenegro	3	2	0	1	11	3	+8	6	Knockout stage
2	Bosnia and Herzegovina (H)	3	2	0	1	9	7	+2	6	Knockout stage
3	Slovenia	3	2	0	1	4	7	−3	6	Knockout stage
4	Albania	3	0	0	3	5	12	−7	0	

Source: EMF EURO
(H) Hosts
1 June 2024
20:00

Bosnia and Herzegovina	3–2	Albania
Senijad Ibričić 5'; Anel Dedić 27'; Suno Dedić 51'	Report	Fatmir Hysenbelliu 7'; Jurgen Grori 19'

Skenderija, Sarajevo
1 June 2024
22:30

Montenegro	0–1	Slovenia
	Report	Miha Kostanjšek 50'

Skenderija, Sarajevo

2 June 2024
18:15

Slovenia	0–5	Bosnia and Herzegovina
	Report	Edin Murga 7', 28'; Srđan Stanić 8'; Senijad Ibričić 10'; Samir Bekrić 48'

Skenderija, Sarajevo
2 June 2024
22:00

Montenegro	6–1	Albania
Dragan Radoman 10'; Miloš Pejaković 14'; Rijad Dervišević 21', 22', 41', 47'	Report	Arlind Gjipi 32'

Skenderija, Sarajevo

4 June 2024
10:30

Albania	2–3	Slovenia
Gilbert Hysko 5'; Klajdi Shini 45'	Report	Jakob Rems 37'; Aleksander Malivojevič 40'; Boštjan Preskar 44'

Skenderija, Sarajevo
4 June 2024
19:30

Bosnia and Herzegovina	1–5	Montenegro
Vedad Salčin 38'	Report	Rijad Dervišević 2'; Ivan Pejaković 7'; Miloš Pejaković 32'; Bogoljub Komatina 41'; Aleksandar Bošković 47'

Skenderija, Sarajevo

=== Group B ===
Pos	Team	Pld	W	D	L	GF	GA	GD	Pts	
1	Kazakhstan	3	2	0	1	10	3	+7	6	Knockout stage
2	Ukraine	3	2	0	1	8	5	+3	6	Knockout stage
3	England	3	1	0	2	7	13	−6	3	
4	Greece	3	1	0	2	2	6	−4	3	

Source: EMF EURO
1 June 2024
11:00

England	2–5	Ukraine
Harry Sargent 39'; Callam Gardner 48'	Report	Ihor Tykhnenko 4', 7'; Vitali Melnyk 14'; Valerii Vlasovych 18'; Denys Sandetskyi 49'

Skenderija, Sarajevo
1 June 2024
12:15

Kazakhstan	0–1	Greece
	Report	Konstantinos Drosis 6'

Skenderija, Sarajevo

2 June 2024
15:45

Ukraine	1–0	Greece
Ihor Tykhnenko 8'	Report

Skenderija, Sarajevo
2 June 2024
17:00

England	0–7	Kazakhstan
	Report	Kuanysh Begalin 2'; Avel Tarzhanov 14', 25', 27'; Zhanibek Seitzhan 17'; Abylay Tuleppov 39'; Nursultan Zhussupov 47'

Skenderija, Sarajevo

3 June 2024
19:30

Kazakhstan	3–2	Ukraine
Rias Yeginzhanov 2'; Ilya Mun 6'; Aslanbek Arshkenov 32'	Report	Oleksandr Kolesnykov 18'; Vasyl Horskii 38'

Skenderija, Sarajevo
4 June 2024
22:00

Greece	1–5	England
Konstantinos Drosis 28'	Report	Callam Gardner 19', 43', 47'; Nick Wybrow 39'; Kristian Campbell 51'

Skenderija, Sarajevo

=== Group C ===
Pos	Team	Pld	W	D	L	GF	GA	GD	Pts	
1	Slovakia	3	3	0	0	19	5	+14	9	Knockout stage
2	Czech Republic	3	2	0	1	9	8	+1	6	Knockout stage
3	Spain	3	0	1	2	7	12	−5	1	
4	Croatia	3	0	1	2	6	16	−10	1	

Source: EMF EURO
1 June 2024
15:15

Czech Republic	4–2	Spain
David Macháček 18', 50'; Richard Svoboda 28'; Josef Stránský 37'	Report	Pablo Romero 8'; Robert Núñez 42'

Skenderija, Sarajevo
1 June 2024
17:45

Slovakia	10–1	Croatia
Adam Kuľha 7'; Tomáš Mikluš 8', 9'; Martin Ďuráči 28', 28', 39'; Martin Kapraľ 35'; Milan Nestorik 38'; Filip Kis 43'; Roland Černák 47'	Report	Zoran Lukavečki 36'

Skenderija, Sarajevo

3 June 2024
13:00

Czech Republic	4–3	Croatia
Josef Stránský 4', 11'; Denis Laňka 45'; Jaroslav Kubát 48'	Report	Ivan Kaurin 20', 35', 37'

Skenderija, Sarajevo
3 June 2024
15:45

Spain	3–6	Slovakia
Samuel Aparicio 4'; Pablo Romero 30', 42'	Report	Filip Kis 16', 23'; Rudolf Beliš 26'; Peter Terpaj 29'; Jaroslav Repa 37'; Erik Feriančik 50'

Skenderija, Sarajevo

4 June 2024
15:45

Croatia	2–2	Spain
Ivan Kaurin 21'; Alen Herceg 31'	Report	Pablo Romero 15'; ? 36'

Skenderija, Sarajevo
4 June 2024
20:45

Slovakia	3–1	Czech Republic
Filip Kis 4'; Erik Jendrišek 19', 51'	Report	Denis Laňka 19'

Skenderija, Sarajevo

=== Group D ===
Pos	Team	Pld	W	D	L	GF	GA	GD	Pts	
1	Romania	3	2	1	0	14	2	+12	7	Knockout stage
2	Hungary	3	2	1	0	5	1	+4	7	Knockout stage
3	Poland	3	1	0	2	10	9	+1	3	Knockout stage
4	Turkey	3	0	0	3	1	18	−17	0	

Source: EMF EURO
1 June 2024
16:30

Romania	9–0	Turkey
Mircea Ungur 4'; Cătălin Tineiu 9', 25'; Vlad Mocanu 24'; Iulian Sîplăcan 26'; Raul Dumitrovici 34', 45'; Alexandru Nechita 48'; Vasile Pop 50'	Report

Skenderija, Sarajevo
1 June 2024
21:15

Hungary	3–1	Poland
Gábor Kiss 12', 20'; Viktor Kozó 17'	Report	Piotr Makowski 40'

Skenderija, Sarajevo

2 June 2024
19:30

Hungary	2–0	Turkey
Dávid Csoszánszki 9'; Barnabás Győri 50'	Report

Skenderija, Sarajevo
2 June 2024
20:45

Poland	2–5	Romania
Karol Bienas 8'; Patryk Gondek 24'	Report	Dragoș Niţu 20'; Marius Balogh 25', 50'; Andrei Șumălan 31'; Alexandru Nechita 48'

Skenderija, Sarajevo

3 June 2024
20:45

Romania	0–0	Hungary
	Report

Skenderija, Sarajevo
3 June 2024
22:00

Turkey	1–7	Poland
İsa Binici 38'	Report	Krystian Chrobak 8'; Piotr Makowski 18', 31', 52'; Patryk Gondek 21'; Bartosz Pieńczykowski 25', 32'

Skenderija, Sarajevo

=== Group E ===
Pos	Team	Pld	W	D	L	GF	GA	GD	Pts	
1	Serbia	3	2	1	0	5	3	+2	7	Knockout stage
2	Bulgaria	3	2	0	1	5	3	+2	6	Knockout stage
3	Georgia	3	1	1	1	4	5	−1	4	Knockout stage
4	Portugal	3	0	0	3	4	7	−3	0	

Source: EMF EURO
1 June 2024
13:30

Serbia	2–2	Georgia
Veselin Guberinić 16'; Aleksandar Zolnajić 39'	Report	Luka Partsvania 23'; Gari Tsereteli 36'

Skenderija, Sarajevo
2 June 2024
13:30

Bulgaria	3–2	Portugal
Nikolay Marinov 34'; Denis Ivanov 42'; Dimitar Karov 49'	Report	João Santos 13'; Tiago Lapa 25'

Skenderija, Sarajevo

3 June 2024
11:45

Serbia	2–1	Portugal
Aleksandar Ignjić 12'; Lazar Veselinović 46'	Report	Rafael Correia 25'

Skenderija, Sarajevo
3 June 2024
18:15

Georgia	0–2	Bulgaria
	Report	Dimitar Dimitrov 33'; Miroslav Kayryakov 45'

Skenderija, Sarajevo

4 June 2024
13:00

Portugal	1–2	Georgia
Fábio Lopes 45'	Report	Saba Machitidze 35', 49'

Skenderija, Sarajevo
4 June 2024
18:15

Bulgaria	0–1	Serbia
	Report	Milan Čičić 7'

Skenderija, Sarajevo

=== Group F ===
Pos	Team	Pld	W	D	L	GF	GA	GD	Pts	
1	Azerbaijan	3	3	0	0	11	1	+10	9	Knockout stage
2	France	3	1	1	1	9	6	+3	4	Knockout stage
3	Belgium	3	1	1	1	8	6	+2	4	Knockout stage
4	Italy	3	0	0	3	0	15	−15	0	

Source: EMF EURO
2 June 2024
11:00

Azerbaijan	3–0	Belgium
Vusal Isayev 25', 35'; Samir Hamzayev 39'	Report

Skenderija, Sarajevo
2 June 2024
12:15

France	5–0	Italy
	Report

Skenderija, Sarajevo

3 June 2024
10:30

France	3–3	Belgium
Cédric Siino 4'; Lény Esclapez 11'; Stéphane Sanches 32'	Report	Julien Meunier 9', 40', 50'

Skenderija, Sarajevo
3 June 2024
17:00

Italy	0–5	Azerbaijan
	Report

Skenderija, Sarajevo

4 June 2024
11:45

Belgium	5–0	Italy
	Report

Skenderija, Sarajevo
4 June 2024
17:00

Azerbaijan	3–1	France
Mirkamil Aliyev 8'; Ramiz Chovadrov 30'; Vusal Isayev 49'	Report	Cédric Siino 34'

Skenderija, Sarajevo

=== Ranking of third-placed teams ===
Pos	Grp	Team	Pld	W	D	L	GF	GA	GD	Pts	
1	A	Slovenia	3	2	0	1	4	7	−3	6	Knockout stage
2	F	Belgium	3	1	1	1	8	6	+2	4	Knockout stage
3	E	Georgia	3	1	1	1	4	5	−1	4	Knockout stage
4	D	Poland	3	1	0	2	10	9	+1	3	Knockout stage
5	B	England	3	1	0	2	7	13	−6	3	
6	C	Spain	3	0	1	2	7	12	−5	1	

Source: EMF EURO

== Knockout stage ==
=== Bracket ===
Round of 16
5 June, 19:00
Montenegro	4
Poland	2
5 June, 16:00
Ukraine	2
France	3
5 June, 12:30
Serbia	4
Hungary	1
5 June, 22:00
Slovakia	1 (0)
Belgium	1 (1)
5 June, 11:00
Romania	3
Georgia	0
5 June, 20:30
Bosnia and Herzegovina	2 (3)
Czech Republic	2 (2)
5 June, 14:00
Kazakhstan	1
Slovenia	0
5 June, 17:30
Azerbaijan	3
Bulgaria	1

Quarter-finals
6 June, 18:30
Montenegro	2
France	3
6 June, 21:30
Serbia	4
Belgium	0
6 June, 20:00
Romania	4
Bosnia and Herzegovina	1
6 June, 17:00
Kazakhstan	0 (7)
Azerbaijan	0 (6)

Semi-finals
7 June, 19:00
France	0
Serbia	5
7 June, 20:30
Romania	1 (3)
Kazakhstan	1 (1)

Final
8 June, 20:45
Serbia	1 (10)
Romania	1 (9)
Third place
8 June, 19:00
France	2
Kazakhstan	7

=== Round of 16 ===
5 June 2024
11:00

Romania	3–0	Georgia
Mircea Ungur 5'; Alexandru Nechita 33'; Vlad Mocanu 45'	Report

Skenderija, Sarajevo
5 June 2024
12:30

Serbia	4–1	Hungary
Marko Živcukin 7'; Čedomir Tomčić 19'; Marko Novaković 30'; Veselin Guberinić 34'	Report	Viktor Kozó 17'

Skenderija, Sarajevo
5 June 2024
14:00

Kazakhstan	1–0	Slovenia
Dias Yeginzhanov 29'	Report

Skenderija, Sarajevo
5 June 2024
16:00

Ukraine	2–3	France
Oleksandr Kolesnykov 35'; Ihor Tykhnenko 39'	Report	Dylan Rozier 10'; Dardan Hasani 27'; Stéphane Sanches 38'

Skenderija, Sarajevo
5 June 2024
17:30

Azerbaijan	3–1	Bulgaria
Ramiz Chovadrov 7'; Tamkin Khalilzade 31'; Ravan Karimov 45'	Report	Iavor Guentchev 21'

Skenderija, Sarajevo
5 June 2024
19:00

Montenegro	4–2	Poland
Rijad Dervišević 5'; Miloš Pejaković 42'; Ivan Mijušković 45', 50'	Report	Bartosz Pieńczykowski 49'; Patryk Gondek 50'

Skenderija, Sarajevo
5 June 2024
20:30

Bosnia and Herzegovina	2–2	Czech Republic
Anel Dedić 14'; Miloš Urta 45'	Report	Vítězslav Hrubý 20'; Josef Stránský 24'
Penalties
Vedad Salčin (penalty scored); Suno Dedić (penalty scored); Senijad Ibričić (penalty scored)	3–2	Tomáš Jelínek (penalty scored); Daniel Žížala (penalty missed); Stanislav Mařík (penalty scored)

Skenderija, Sarajevo
5 June 2024
22:00

Slovakia	1–1	Belgium
Jaroslav Repa 9'	Report	Walid Jaadi 23'
Penalties
Jaroslav Repa (penalty missed); Milan Nestorik (penalty missed); Roland Černák (penalty missed)	0–1	Julien Meunier (penalty scored); Walid Jaadi (penalty missed)

Skenderija, Sarajevo

=== Quarter-finals ===
6 June 2024
17:00

Kazakhstan	0–0	Azerbaijan
	Report
Penalties
Kuanysh Begalin (penalty scored); Vitaliy Grigoryev (penalty scored); Abylay Tuleppov (penalty scored); Avel Tarzhanov (penalty scored); Ilya Mun (penalty scored); Dias Yeginzhanov (penalty scored); Nursultan Zhussupov (penalty scored)	7–6	Ravan Karimov (penalty scored); Tamkin Khalilzade (penalty scored); Elvin Alizada (penalty scored); Vusal Isayev (penalty scored); Mirmehdi Rzayev (penalty scored); Mirkamil Aliyev (penalty scored); Museyyib Valiyev (penalty missed)

Skenderija, Sarajevo
6 June 2024
18:30

Montenegro	2–3	France
Rijad Dervišević 7'; Nikola Popović 11'	Report	Cédric Siino 23'; Nadir Euvrard 43'; Dardan Hasani 50'

Skenderija, Sarajevo
6 June 2024
20:00

Romania	4–1	Bosnia and Herzegovina
Viorel Șaim 6', 24'; Marius Balogh 11'; Raul Dumitrovici 26'	Report	Senijad Ibričić 50'

Skenderija, Sarajevo
6 June 2024
21:30

Serbia	4–0	Belgium
Lazar Veselinović 9'; Veselin Guberinić 38'; Čedomir Tomčić 43'; Aleksandar Ignjić 44'	Report

Skenderija, Sarajevo

=== Semi-finals ===
7 June 2024
19:00

Serbia	5–0	France
Marko Živcukin 8'; Marko Novaković 9'; Aleksandar Zolnajić 21'; Lazar Veselinović 43'; Zarije Gojković 47'	Report

Skenderija, Sarajevo
7 June 2024
20:30

Romania	1–1	Kazakhstan
Mircea Ungur 37'	Report	Dias Yeginzhanov 17'
Penalties
Marius Balogh (penalty scored); Andrei Șumălan (penalty scored); Vasile Pop (penalty scored)	3–1	Kuanysh Begalin (penalty scored); Vitaliy Grigoryev (penalty missed)

Skenderija, Sarajevo

=== Bronze medal match ===
8 June 2024
19:00

France	2–7	Kazakhstan
Dylan Rozier 11'; Cédric Siino 38'	Report	Dias Yeginzhanov 2', 37'; Alexandr Kislitsyn 6'; Ilya Mun 9'; Avel Tarzhanov 43'; Aslanbek Arshkenov 48'; Uralbek Yegizbayev 50'

Skenderija, Sarajevo

=== Final ===
8 June 2024
20:45

Serbia	1–1	Romania
Aleksandar Ignjić 21'	Report	Andrei Balea 36'
Penalties
Veselin Guberinić (penalty scored); Aleksandar Ignjić (penalty missed); Nikola Tomić (penalty scored); Aleksandar Zolnajić (penalty scored); Đorđe Celin (penalty scored); Zarije Gojković (penalty scored); Marko Novaković (penalty scored); Čedomir Tomčić (penalty scored); Lazar Veselinović (penalty scored); Milan Čičić (penalty scored); Stefan Bosnić (penalty scored)	10–9	Marius Balogh (penalty missed); Andrei Șumălan (penalty scored); Vasile Pop (penalty scored); Cătălin Tineiu (penalty scored); Alexandru Nechita (penalty scored); Vlad Mocanu (penalty scored); Raul Dumitrovici (penalty scored); Viorel Șaim (penalty scored); Andrei Balea (penalty scored); Gabriel Dumitraşcu (penalty scored); Iulian Sîplăcan (penalty missed)

Skenderija, Sarajevo
