= 2026 EMF EURO =

Tournament details
- Host country: Slovakia
- City: Bratislava
- Dates: 27th May - 4th June 2026
- Teams: 24
- Venue: TIPOS Aréna (in 1 host city)

Final positions
- Champions: Azerbaijan (2nd title)
- Runners-up: Ukraine
- Third place: Serbia, Hungary

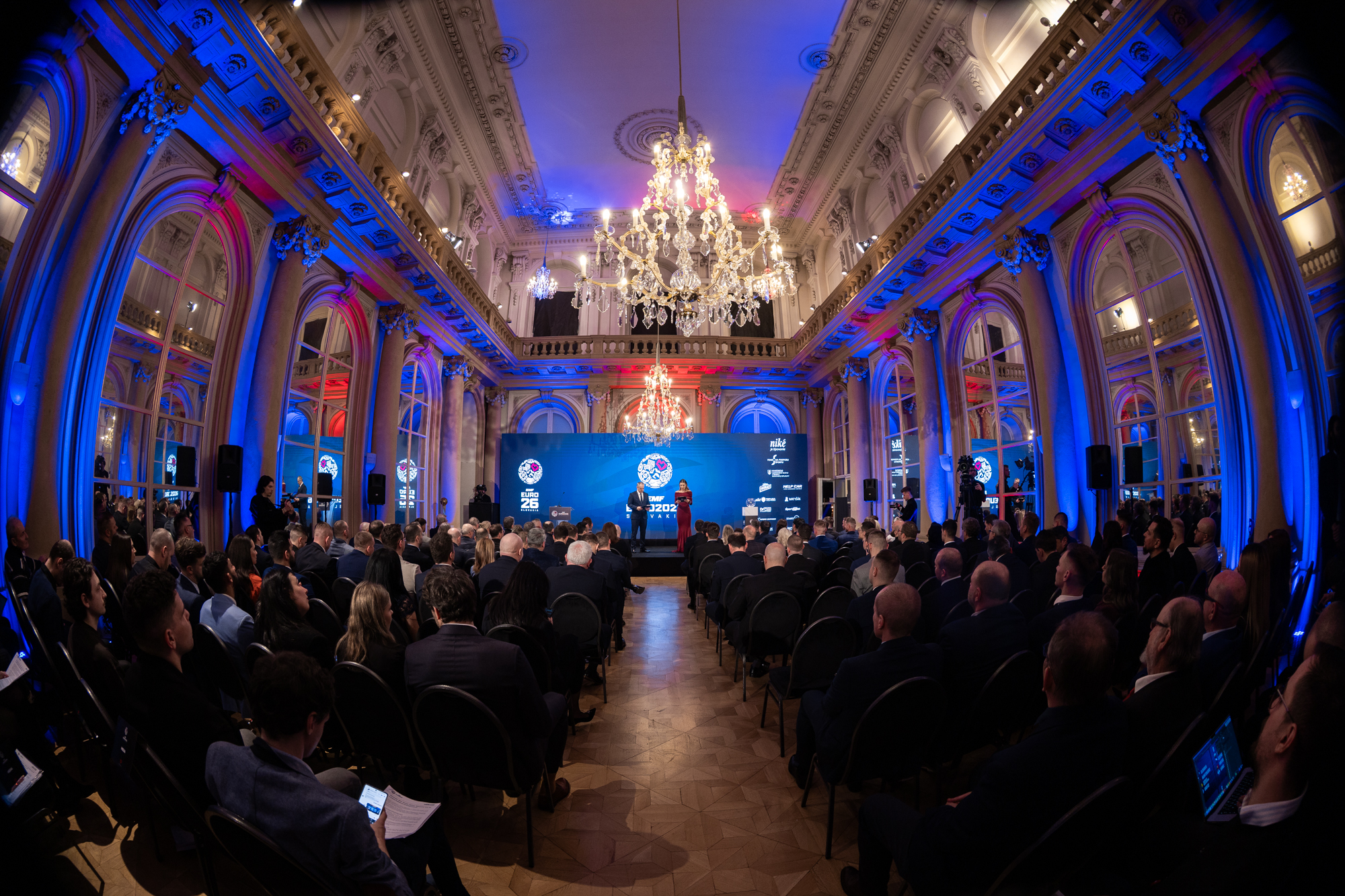
Draw ceremony EMF Euro 2026

The 2026 EMF Euro is the tweltfth edition of the EMF EURO for national minifootball teams, and the tenth governed by the European Minifootball Federation. It takes place in TIPOS Aréna in Bratislava, Slovakia, from 27 May to 4 June 2026.

== Teams ==
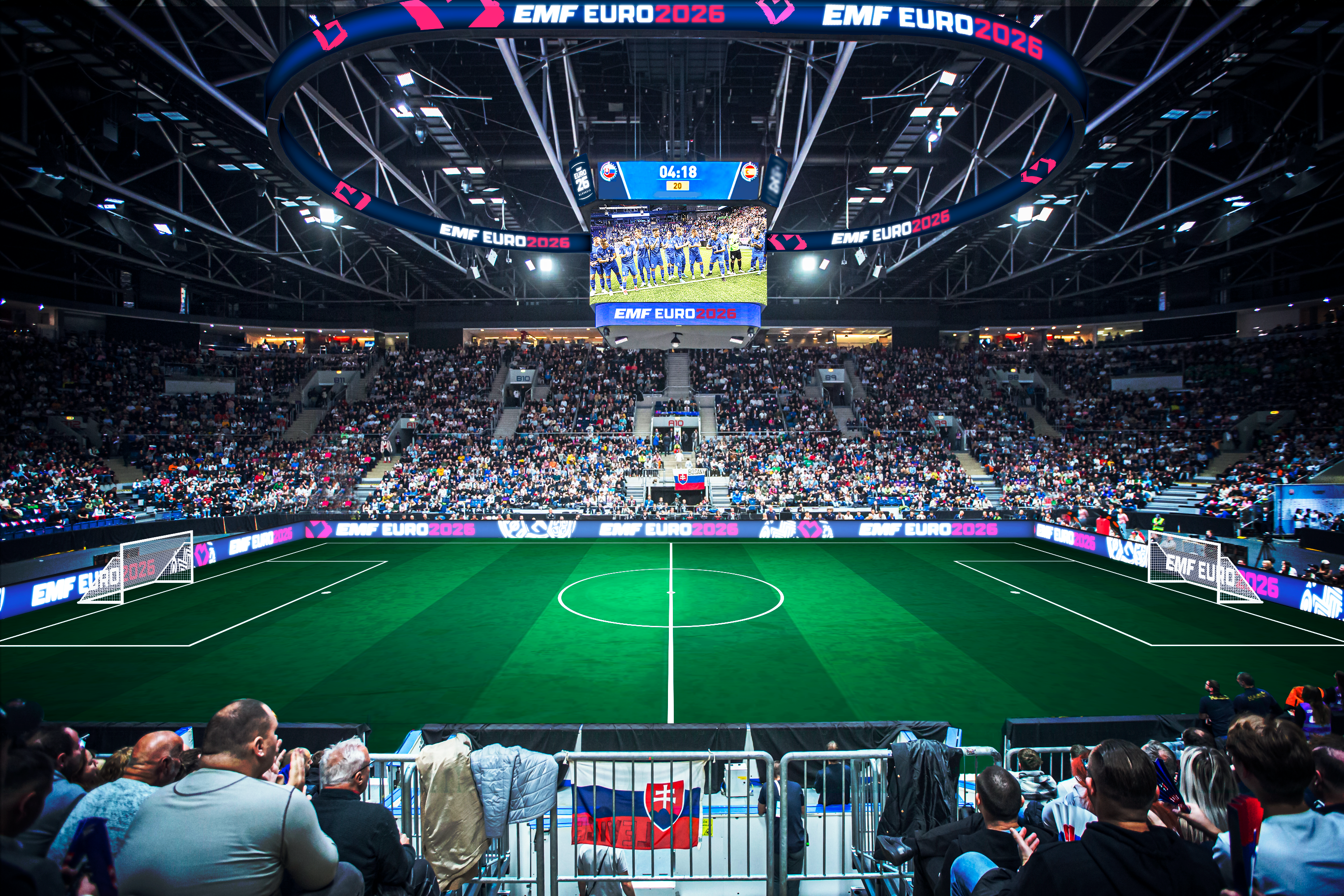
TIPOS Arena with artificial grass

The final tournament includes 24 teams.

Pot 1	Pot 2	Pot 3	Pot 4
Slovakia (H)	France	Belgium	Israel
Romania	Montenegro	England	Slovenia
Azerbaijan	Hungary	Bosnia and Herzegovina	Spain
Serbia	Czech Republic	Italy	Greece
Kazakhstan	Ukraine	Poland	Turkey
Bulgaria	Georgia	Portugal	Austria

== Draw ==
The group draw took place on 27 February 2026 in Hall of Mirrors of the Primate's Palace .

The teams from the first pot were drawn by the event ambassador Juraj Kucka. Teams from the second pot were drawn by the former coach of the Slovak national team in minifootball Ladislav Borbély. The third pot was drawn by Matej Beňuš, who is a medalist from the Olympics. The fourth pot was drawn by the winner of UEFA Euro 1976 Antonín Panenka, who is the scorer of the legendary penalty that is named after him.

== Group stage ==
=== Group A ===
Pos	Team	Pld	W	D	L	GF	GA	GD	Pts	
1	Bosnia and Herzegovina	3	1	2	0	5	4	+1	5	Knockout stage
2	Greece	3	1	1	1	5	6	−1	4	Knockout stage
3	Montenegro	3	1	1	1	5	5	0	4	Knockout stage
4	Slovakia (H)	3	1	0	2	6	6	0	3	

Source: EMF EURO
(H) Hosts

=== Group B ===
Pos	Team	Pld	W	D	L	GF	GA	GD	Pts	
1	Czech Republic	3	2	1	0	10	5	+5	7	Knockout stage
2	Bulgaria	3	1	2	0	7	5	+2	5	Knockout stage
3	Portugal	3	1	0	2	10	10	0	3	Knockout stage
4	Israel	3	0	1	2	3	10	−7	1	

Source: EMF EURO

=== Group C ===
Pos	Team	Pld	W	D	L	GF	GA	GD	Pts	
1	Ukraine	3	2	1	0	8	3	+5	7	Knockout stage
2	Serbia	3	2	1	0	5	3	+2	7	Knockout stage
3	Turkey	3	0	1	2	7	9	−2	1	
4	Belgium	3	0	1	2	5	10	−5	1	

Source: EMF EURO

=== Group D ===
Pos	Team	Pld	W	D	L	GF	GA	GD	Pts	
1	Romania	3	2	1	0	5	1	+4	7	Knockout stage
2	Georgia	3	1	1	1	1	3	−2	4	Knockout stage
3	Spain	3	0	3	0	2	2	0	3	
4	England	3	0	1	2	1	3	−2	1	

Source: EMF EURO

=== Group E ===
Pos	Team	Pld	W	D	L	GF	GA	GD	Pts	
1	Poland	3	3	0	0	12	7	+5	9	Knockout stage
2	Kazakhstan	3	1	1	1	3	2	+1	4	Knockout stage
3	Hungary	3	1	1	1	5	5	0	4	Knockout stage
4	Slovenia	3	0	0	3	6	12	−6	0	

Source: EMF EURO

=== Group F ===
Pos	Team	Pld	W	D	L	GF	GA	GD	Pts	
1	Azerbaijan	3	3	0	0	7	2	+5	9	Knockout stage
2	France	3	1	1	1	5	4	+1	4	Knockout stage
3	Austria	3	1	0	2	6	4	+2	3	Knockout stage
4	Italy	3	0	1	2	0	8	−8	1	

Source: EMF EURO

== Knockout stage ==
=== Bracket ===
Round of 16
31 May, 17:30
Bosnia and Herzegovina	2 (2)
Hungary	2 (3)
31 May, 19:00
Bulgaria	6
France	1
31 May, 20:30
Poland	1 (1)
Georgia	1 (2)
31 May, 22:00
Ukraine	3
Portugal	1
1 June, 17:30
Romania	7
Austria	0
1 June, 19:30
Greece	2
Serbia	4
1 June, 20:00
Czech Republic	2
Montenegro	0
1 June, 22:00
Azerbaijan	3
Kazakhstan	2

Quarter-finals
2 June, 17:30
Hungary	4
Bulgaria	0
2 June, 19:30
Georgia	0
Ukraine	4
2 June, 20:30
Romania	4
Serbia	6
2 June, 22:00
Czech Republic	2
Azerbaijan	5

Semi-finals
3 June, 19:15
Hungary	1
Ukraine	5
3 June, 20:45
Serbia	1 (1)
Azerbaijan	1 (3)

Final
4 June, 20:30
Ukraine	0
Azerbaijan	2
