= Victor Garza =

American soccer player

Personal information
- Full name: Victor Hazael Garza Garza
- Date of birth: February 25, 1992 (age 34)
- Place of birth: McAllen, Texas, United States
- Height: 5 ft 8 in (1.73 m)
- Positions: Midfielder; forward

Youth career
- 2007–2008: Brad Friedel Premier Soccer Academy
- 2008–2009: Columbus Crew
- 2009–2012: Tigres

Senior career*
Years	Team	Apps	(Gls)
2012–2013	Tigres	0	(0)
2014	Dallas City FC	14	(8)
2015	Ararat Yerevan	6	(0)
2016–2018	Tampico Madero	0	(0)
2016	→ Tampico Madero (loan)	22	(0)
2017–2018	→ Rio Grande Valley FC (loan)	25	(0)
2019–2020	Rio Grande Valley FC	11	(0)

International career
2009	United States U17	20	(10)
2011	United States U20	12	(6)
- * Club domestic league appearances and goals as of October 5, 2020

Victor Hazael Garza Garza (born February 25, 1992) is an American soccer player.

== Club career ==
=== Professional ===
On February 3, 2012, Garza debuted with Liga MX México Primera División side Tigres on Copa Libertadores match against Union Espanola.

In 2013, Garza played one friendly match with Turkish club Konyaspor versus rival Antalyaspor.

In 2014, Garza captained US NPSL team Dallas City FC and won the Trinity River Cup. Garza played 1,260 minutes and contributed eight goals and 13 assists.

On January 17, 2015, Garza signed with Armenian first division side Ararat Yerevan.

In 2016, after trying out his luck in Europe, he returned to Tigres, who loaned him out to Ascenso MX team Tampico Madero F.C.

In 2017, Victor returns to his native Rio Grande Valley to play for United Soccer League team Rio Grande Valley FC Toros on loan from Tigres.

In 2018, Garza suffered a major knee injury and lost most of his season with the Toros. He recovered from the injury and was given shirt number 10 for the 2019 USL season. His move to the Rio Grande Valley FC Toros became permanent after the team purchased his rights from Tigres.

== International career ==
Garza has represented the United States at the U17 level, playing two international friendly matches, and at the U20 level, playing four international friendly matches.
