= Nikola Prebiračević =

Serbian footballer

Personal information
- Full name: Nikola Prebiračević
- Date of birth: 23 January 1987 (age 39)
- Place of birth: Belgrade, SFR Yugoslavia
- Height: 1.86 m (6 ft 1 in)
- Position: Defender

Youth career
- Red Star Belgrade

Senior career*
Years	Team	Apps	(Gls)
2006	→ Bečej (Loan)	18	(3)
2007–2009	Hajduk Beograd	40	(2)
2009–2010	Mladi Radnik	9	(1)
2010–2011	Javor Ivanjica	0	(0)
2011–2012	Drina Zvornik	9	(0)
2012–2013	OPS	13	(1)
2013–2014	Leotar	25	(0)
2014–2015	Ararat Yerevan	10	(0)
2015	Sūduva	20	(0)
2016	Utenis Utena	1	(0)
2017–2018	Dečić	24	(0)
2018	Ibar		
2019–2022	Leotar	12	(1)
2022–2024	Mladost Gacko		
- * Club domestic league appearances and goals

Nikola Prebiračević (Serbian Cyrillic: Никола Пребирачевић; born 23 January 1986) is a Serbian retired footballer.

== Club career ==
He began his career at his hometown club Red Star Belgrade (1999-2006), where he spent 7 years of his life. Prebiračević also spent time on loan at FK Bečej (2006).

After FK Bečej he went to FK Hajduk Beograd in the 2nd League of Serbia where he spent two years (2007-2009). He also spent 6 months playing in the youth team of AFC Ajax.

Then he signed a professional contract with FK Mladi Radnik from Požarevac (Serbian SuperLiga, 2009-2010). After 1 year he moved to FK Javor Ivanjica (Serbian SuperLiga, 2010-2011). Prebiračević played half a season for FK Drina Zvornik (Boanian Premier League, 2011) before suffering an injury which ended his season.

Prebiračević recovered from injury and signed for OPS in Finland for the 2012 season. After Finland OPS he went to FK Leotar playing in the Premier League of Bosnia and Herzegovina 2013-14 season. He returned to the club for the 2019-20 season.
