= Bryan de la Fuente =

American soccer player (born 1992)

Personal information
- Date of birth: July 1, 1992 (age 34)
- Place of birth: Laredo, Texas, United States
- Height: 5 ft 11 in (1.80 m)
- Positions: Midfielder; defender

Youth career
- 2005–2007: Guadalajara
- 2007–2010: Chivas USA

Senior career*
Years	Team	Apps	(Gls)
2010–2011	Chivas USA	1	(0)
2012	Tijuana	0	(0)
2013	Chivas USA	11	(2)
2014	Los Angeles Misioneros	13	(4)
2014–2016	Ararat Yerevan	49	(9)
2016	Shirak	12	(1)
2017–2018	California United FC II	47	(7)
2019–2020	Las Vegas Lights	27	(1)
2021	California United Strikers	14	(0)

International career
2010	United States U20	7	(0)
- * Club domestic league appearances and goals as of 23:31, 10 October 2021 (UTC)

Bryan de la Fuente (born July 1, 1992) is an American soccer player.

== Club career ==
=== Professional ===
On August 25, 2010, de la Fuente became the fourth home grown player to sign a professional contract with Chivas USA. On October 23, he made his professional debut in the final game of the 2010 season against the Chicago Fire. De la Fuente was released by Chivas USA in January 2012, and subsequently signed with Mexican Primera División team Club Tijuana.

He returned to Chivas USA for the 2013 season.

In August 2014, de la Fuente signed for Armenian Premier League side FC Ararat Yerevan alongside fellow Los Angeles Misioneros teammates Jamel Wallace and Christian King. On the final day of the Armenian summer transfer window, de la Fuente signed a one-year contract with FC Shirak, but left the club on 30 December 2016.

In 2017, Bryan joined California United FC II where he was a key contributor to the team winning the United Premier Soccer League National Championships in both the Spring & Fall Seasons.

As of February 2018, Bryan joined A.C. Brea in a coaching capacity for their younger division.

On January 9, 2019, de la Fuente signed for USL Championship side Las Vegas Lights.

On April 6, 2021, de la Fuente returned to California United ahead of the 2021 season.

== International career ==
De la Fuente has represented the United States at the U-20 level, playing near 15 games in 7 camps domestic and international. He participated in different international tournaments including the 2010 Milk Cup in Northern Ireland where they were champions.

== Career statistics ==
As of match played November 26, 2016

Appearances and goals by club, season and competition
Club	Season	League			National Cup		Other		Total	
Club	Season	Division	Apps	Goals	Apps	Goals	Apps	Goals	Apps	Goals
Chivas USA	2011	Major League Soccer	1	0	0	0	-		1	0
Chivas USA	2013	Major League Soccer	11	2	0	0	-		11	2
Ararat Yerevan	2014–15	Armenian Premier League	23	4	2	1	-		25	5
Ararat Yerevan	2015–16	Armenian Premier League	26	5	2	0	-		28	5
Ararat Yerevan	Total		49	9	4	0	-	-	53	10
Shirak	2016–17	Armenian Premier League	12	1	0	0	-		12	1
Career total			73	12	4	1	-	-	77	13
