= Artur Lesko =

Belarusian footballer

Personal information
- Full name: Artur Andreyevich Lesko
- Date of birth: 25 April 1984 (age 42)
- Place of birth: Baranovichi, Byelorussian SSR, Soviet Union
- Height: 1.90 m (6 ft 3 in)
- Position: Goalkeeper

Team information
- Current team: Energetik-BGU Minsk (gk coach)

Youth career
- 2000–2002: RUOR Minsk
- 2003–2004: Dinamo Minsk

Senior career*
Years	Team	Apps	(Gls)
2001–2002	RUOR Minsk	19	(0)
2003	Dinamo-Juni Minsk	11	(0)
2004–2008	Dinamo Minsk	62	(0)
2008–2009	Kryvbas Kryvyi Rih	2	(0)
2010	Pyunik Yerevan	25	(0)
2011–2012	Minsk	38	(0)
2013	Slutsk	12	(0)
2013	Gomel	9	(0)
2014–2016	Slutsk	59	(0)
2017	Torpedo Minsk	3	(0)
2017	Baranovichi	14	(0)
2018	Lida	12	(0)
2018–2021	Energetik-BGU Minsk	38	(0)

International career
2005–2006	Belarus U21	6	(0)

Managerial career
- 2021–: Energetik-BGU Minsk (gk coach)
- * Club domestic league appearances and goals as of 31 December 2021

Artur Andreyevich Lesko (Belarusian: Артур Андрэевіч Лясько, Artur Lyasko, Russian: Артур Андреевич Лесько; born 25 April 1984) is a Belarusian former football goalkeeper.

== Honours ==
Dinamo Minsk

- Belarusian Premier League champion: 2004

Pyunik Yerevan

- Armenian Premier League champion: 2010
- Armenian Independence Cup winner: 2010

Minsk

- Belarusian Cup winner: 2012–13
