= Arthur Mkrtchyan =

Armenian footballer

Personal information
- Full name: Arthur Azatovich Mkrtchyan
- Date of birth: 9 September 1973 (age 53)
- Place of birth: Yerevan, Soviet Union
- Height: 1.82 m (5 ft 11 1/2 in)
- Position: Defender

Senior career*
Years	Team	Apps	(Gls)
1991–1994	Nairi Yerevan	108	(2)
1995–1998	Pyunik Yerevan	75	(2)
1998	Torpedo Moscow	7	(0)
1999	Krylia Sovetov Samara	15	(0)
2000	Araks Ararat	1	(0)
2000	Mika Yerevan	6	(0)
2001–2004	Pyunik Yerevan	70	(2)
2004	Darida Minsk Raion	9	(0)

International career
1996–2004	Armenia	25	(0)

Managerial career
- 2009–2017: Pyunik (assistant)
- 2017–2020: Ararat-Armenia (assistant)
- 2018: Armenia (assistant)
- 2021: Taraz (assistant)
- 2023–2025: Ararat-Armenia (assistant)
- 2025–: Pyunik (assistant)
- * Club domestic league appearances and goals

Arthur Mkrtchyan (Armenian: Արթուր Մկրտչյան, born on 9 September 1973) is an Armenian football coach and a former defender. He was capped 25 times for the Armenia national team.

== National team statistics ==
Armenia national team
Year	Apps	Goals
1996	2	0
1997	0	0
1998	2	0
1999	9	0
2000	3	0
2001	2	0
2002	2	0
2003	2	0
2004	3	0
Total	25	0
