= Jamel Wallace =

American soccer player (born 1987)

Personal information
- Full name: Jamel Anthony Wallace
- Date of birth: August 12, 1987 (age 39)
- Place of birth: Fort Worth, Texas, United States
- Height: 1.85 m (6 ft 1 in)
- Position: Defender

Youth career
- 2005–2009: San Diego State Aztecs

Senior career*
Years	Team	Apps	(Gls)
2010	Kitsap Pumas	14	(1)
2011	Richmond Kickers	16	(0)
2013	Wilmington Hammerheads	15	(3)
2014	Los Angeles Misioneros	6	(0)
2014	Ararat Yerevan	12	(1)
- * Club domestic league appearances and goals

Jamel Anthony Wallace (born August 12, 1987), is an American retired professional soccer player who played as a defender.

== Career ==
=== Youth and college ===
Wallace played 16 games as a freshman with San Diego State Aztecs. He played 90 minutes in 5 consecutive games and started all 19 games as a Junior. He played 18 games as a senior, scoring 3 goals and 1 assist and scored the game-winning goal against California.

=== Professional ===
Wallace was drafted in the fourth round (59th overall) of the 2010 MLS SuperDraft by Seattle Sounders FC, but was not offered a professional contract by the team.

He signed for the Kitsap Pumas of the USL Premier Development League in April 2010. After one season with Kitsap, Wallace signed with Richmond Kickers of the USL Pro league on March 23, 2011. He made his professional debut on May 7, coming on as a last-minute substitute in a game against the Wilmington Hammerheads.

In August 2014, Wallace signed for Armenian Premier League side Ararat Yerevan alongside fellow Los Angeles Misioneros teammates Bryan de la Fuente and Christian King. Wallace left Ararat Yarevan in February 2015 by mutual consent.

=== After soccer ===
After returning from Armenia Wallace became a branch manager for AccentCare.

== Career statistics ==
As of 26 January 2015

Club performance			League		Cup		Continental		Total	
Season	Club	League	Apps	Goals	Apps	Goals	Apps	Goals	Apps	Goals
2014–15	Ararat Yerevan	Armenian Premier League	12	1	1	0	0	0	13	1
Total	Armenia		12	1	1	0	0	0	13	1
Career total			12	1	1	0	0	0	13	1
