= Andronik Karagezyan =

Russian footballer

Personal information
- Full name: Andronik Arutyunovich Karagezyan
- Date of birth: 17 December 1974 (age 51)
- Place of birth: Gulkevichi, Krasnodar Krai, Russian SFSR
- Height: 1.95 m (6 ft 5 in)
- Position: Goalkeeper

Senior career*
Years	Team	Apps	(Gls)
1997–1998	FC Metalurh-2 Donetsk	1	(0)
1998–1999	Roma Balti	11	(0)
1999	FC Slavyansk Slavyansk-na-Kubani	0	(0)
2001	FC Spartak Anapa	4	(0)
2002	Pyunik FC	18	(0)
2002	FC Kuban Krasnodar	0	(0)
2003	FC Dynamo-SPb St. Petersburg	5	(0)
2004–2007	FC Ryazan	83	(0)
2008	FC Lukhovitsy	15	(0)
2009	FC Taganrog	13	(0)
- * Club domestic league appearances and goals

Andronik Arutyunovich Karagezyan (Russian: Андроник Арутюнович Карагезян; born 17 December 1974) is a former Russian professional football player.

== Club career ==
He played in the Russian Football National League for FC Dynamo-SPb St. Petersburg in 2003.
