= FK Pobeda =

FK Pobeda may refer to:

- GFK Pobeda, an active football club that was based in the city of Prilep, North Macedonia, refounded in 2026.
- FK Pobeda (2010), a defunct football club based in the city of Prilep, North Macedonia
