= Eduard Sturki =

Russian-Armenian footballer

Personal information
- Full name: Eduard Nasibovich Sturki
- Date of birth: 9 August 1993 (age 33)
- Place of birth: Krasnodar, Russia
- Height: 1.82 m (5 ft 11 1/2 in)
- Positions: Midfielder; defender

Youth career
- –2006: FC Sokol Saratov
- 2007–2009: Konoplyov football academy
- 2009–2011: FC Lokomotiv Moscow

Senior career*
Years	Team	Apps	(Gls)
2011	FC Kuban Krasnodar	0	(0)
2011–2012	FC Khimki-M (amateur)		
2012	FC Pyunik	3	(0)
2012–2013	FC Mordovia Saransk	0	(0)
2014	FC Rosich Moskovsky		
2015	FC Volga-Olimpiyets Nizhny Novgorod	5	(0)
2016–2018	FC Sokol Saratov	16	(0)
2018–2019	FC Ocean Kerch		
2019	FC Ararat Moscow (amateur)		
2019	FC Ararat Moscow	0	(0)

International career
2010	Russia U-17	3	(0)
2012	Armenia U-19	6	(0)
- * Club domestic league appearances and goals

Eduard Nasibovich Sturki (Russian: Эдуард Насибович Стурки; born 9 August 1993) is a Russian former football player. He holds Armenian citizenship.

In 2014, he changed his last name from Tatoyan (Eduard Nasibovich Tatoyan; Russian: Эдуард Насибович Татоян; Armenian: Էդուարդ Թաթոյան Նասիբի) to Sturki.

== Club career ==
He made his debut in the Russian Professional Football League for FC Volga-Olimpiyets Nizhny Novgorod on 21 August 2015 in a game against FC Nosta Novotroitsk.

He made his Russian Football National League debut for FC Sokol Saratov on 6 May 2017 in a game against FC Yenisey Krasnoyarsk.

== Honours ==
Pyunik

- Armenian Independence Cup: 2012–13
