= Čedomir Tomčić =

Serbian footballer

Personal information
- Full name: Čedomir Tomčić
- Date of birth: 20 April 1987 (age 39)
- Place of birth: Novi Sad, SFR Yugoslavia
- Height: 1.95 m (6 ft 5 in)
- Positions: Defensive midfielder; centre-back

Team information
- Current team: Bečej

College career
Years	Team	Apps	(Gls)
2007-2009	Hartford Hawks		

Senior career*
Years	Team	Apps	(Gls)
2005–2007	Vojvodina	0	(0)
2005–2006	→ Sloga Temerin (loan)	2	(0)
2010–2011	Cement Beočin	22	(1)
2011–2013	Inđija	56	(4)
2013	Javor Ivanjica	7	(0)
2014	Inđija	14	(2)
2014	Ararat Yerevan	14	(2)
2015	Proleter Novi Sad	11	(0)
2015	Bačka Palanka	8	(1)
2016	Serbiska KoIF Kozara	18	(5)
2017–2019	Bečej		
2019–2020	Mladost Novi Sad		
2021–	Bečej		
Medal record
Men's football
Representing Romania
EMF EURO
Gold medal – first place	2024 Skenderija
- * Club domestic league appearances and goals as of 28 November 2015

Čedomir Tomčić (Serbian Cyrillic: Чедомир Томчић; born 20 April 1987) is a Serbian football midfielder who plays for Bečej.

He had a spell in US college soccer with Hartford Hawks.
