= Hossein Hosseini (footballer, born 1988) =

Iranian footballer

Personal information
- Full name: Seyyed Hossein Hosseini
- Date of birth: August 31, 1988 (age 38)
- Place of birth: Tehran, Iran
- Position: Left back

Team information
- Current team: Kheybar Khorramabad

Youth career
- Saipa

Senior career*
Years	Team	Apps	(Gls)
2008–2012	Saipa	14	(0)
2012–2013	Paykan	10	(0)
2013–2014	Mes Soongoun Varzaghan		
2016	Torpedo Kutaisi		
2016–	Kheybar Khorramabad	0	(0)
- * Club domestic league appearances and goals as of 20 October 2015

Seyyed Hossein Hosseini (Persian: سیدحسین حسینی; born August 31, 1988) is an Iranian football defender who last played for Ararat in Armenian Premier League.

== Career ==
Hosseini joined Paykan in Summer 2011.

== Club career statistics ==
As of 31 July 2012

Club performance			League		Cup		Continental		Total	
Season	Club	League	Apps	Goals	Apps	Goals	Apps	Goals	Apps	Goals
Iran			League		Hazfi Cup		Asia		Total	
2008–09	Saipa	Pro League	6	0			–			
2009–10	Saipa	Pro League	4	0			–			
2010–11	Saipa	Pro League	4	0			–			
2011–12	Saipa	Pro League	0	0			–			
2012–13	Paykan	Pro League	3	0	0	0	–		3	0
Career total			17	0			0	0		
