= Azerbaijan Minifootball Federation =

Sports governing body in Azerbaijan

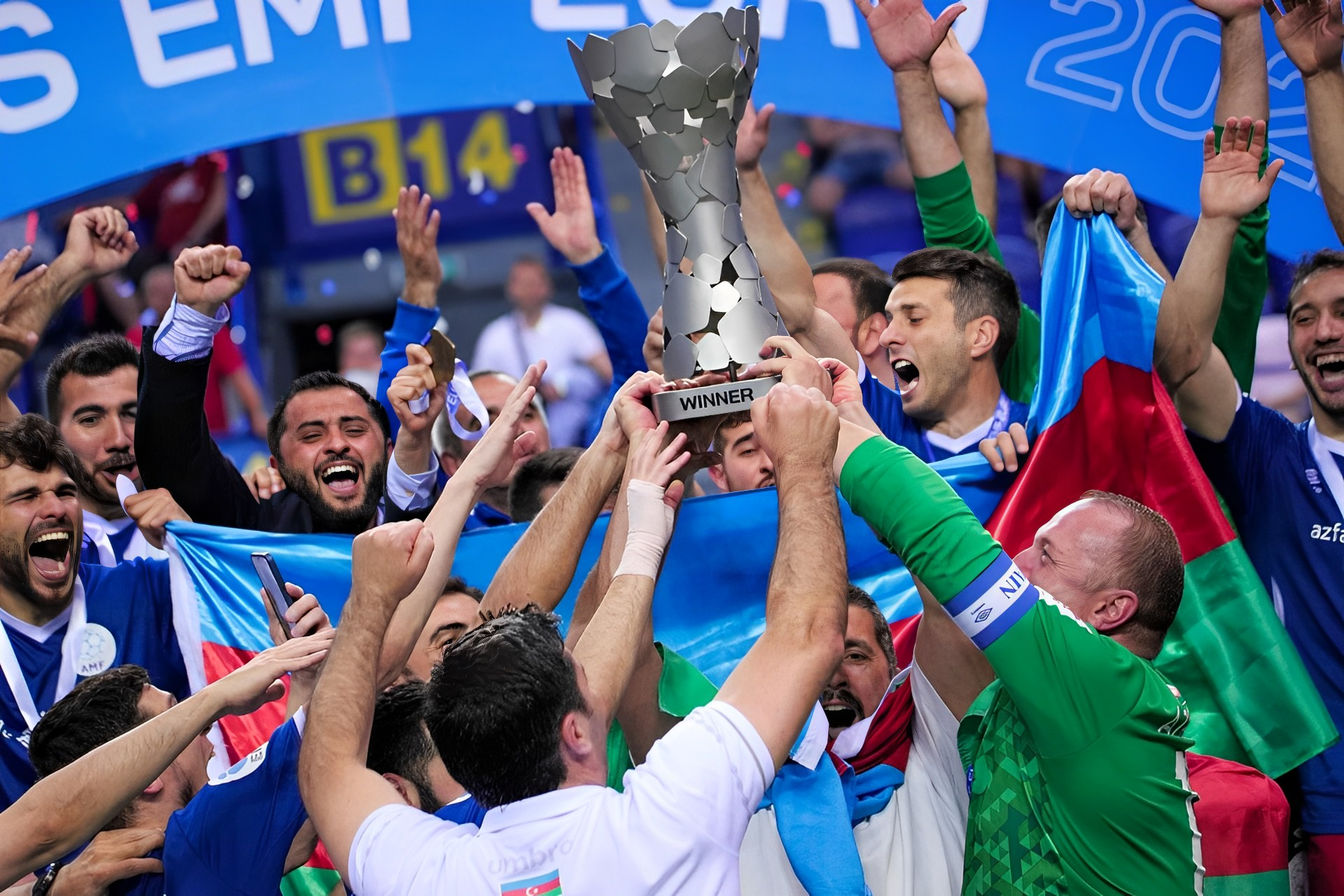
- Azerbaijan national team with the championship cup
- Abbreviation: AMF
- Formation: September 29, 2017; 8 years ago
- Headquarters: Baku, Azerbaijan
- Location: Azerbaijan

Azerbaijan Minifootball Federation is the official body that controls mini-football in Azerbaijan. It was established on September 29, 2017, in order to develop and promote the sport of mini-football in Azerbaijan. In 2018, the Federation became a member of the European Minifootball Federation and World Minifootball Federations, which gives Azerbaijan the opportunity to participate in international minifootball tournaments.

== History ==
The Azerbaijan Minifootball Federation (AMF) was established on September 29, 2017, with the aim of promoting and developing the minifootball sport in Azerbaijan. In addition, the federation aims to create a national team that will represent Azerbaijan in international tournaments and promote the country's minifootball talent in the global arena.

Azerbaijan Minifootball Federation became a member of European Minifootball Federation and World Minifootball Federations in 2018. The first local competition organized by the Federation was held in 2018 with the participation of 32 teams.

On August 12–18, 2018, the Azerbaijan National Team made its debut at the European Championship held in Kyiv, the capital of Ukraine.

== Activity ==
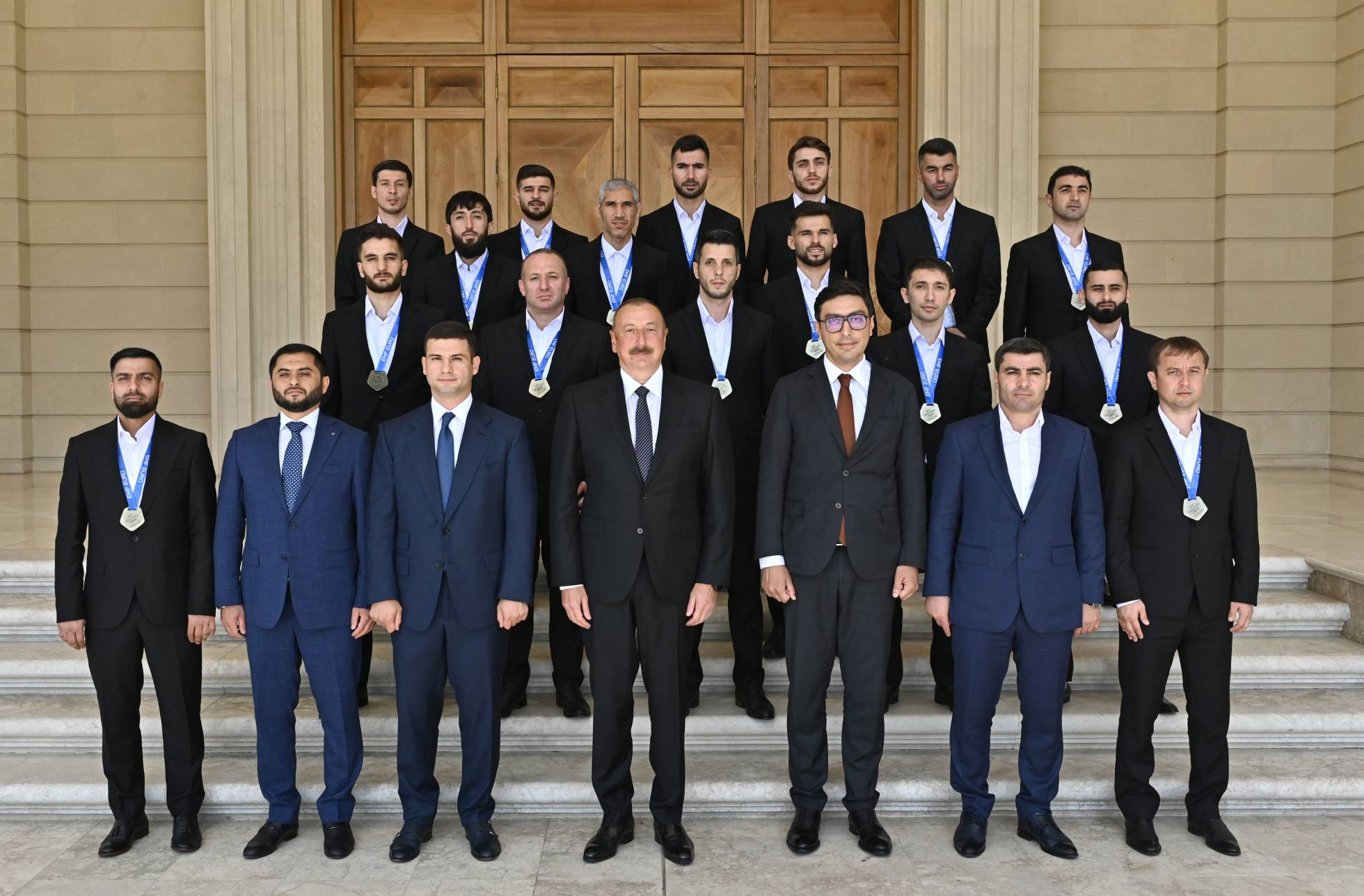
Ilham Aliyev has received members of the Azerbaijan national minifootball team who won the European Championship in Slovakia.

One of the main activities of the Federation is the organization of domestic and international competitions. AMF regularly hosts tournaments and leagues throughout the year and sends the national mini-soccer team to international tournaments to represent Azerbaijan on the global stage and promote the country's reputation as a competitive force in the sport.

The Federation works with schools, community groups and other organizations to raise awareness of the sport and encourage more people to take part in it. This includes organizing promotional events, public relations programs and media campaigns to increase the development and popularity of mini-football in Azerbaijan.

Another important direction of AMF's activity is the establishment of relations with other minifootball organizations of the world. The Federation is a member of the European Mini-Football Federation and the World Mini-Football Federation and participates in meetings and conferences with other national federations to share knowledge and best practices.

The main partner and sponsor of the Azerbaijan Minifootball Federation is "Azfar Group". Starting from 2018, the Federation has been closely cooperating with "Azfar Group" company in a number of mass sports events and projects. At the moment, the federation is working together with "Azfar Group" company on the plan of proposals regarding the holding of the upcoming world and European championships in Azerbaijan.
