= Azerbaijan national minifootball team =

The Azerbaijan national minifootball team (Azerbaijani: Azərbaycan milli minifutbol komandası) represents Azerbaijan in international minifootball (small-sided football) competitions and is governed by the Azerbaijan Minifootball Federation. The team's biggest success is winning the World Mini Football Championship held in Baku in 2025.

== History ==
The Azerbaijan National Mini Football Team officially began to take shape in 2017 with the establishment of the Azerbaijan Mini Football Federation (AMF).

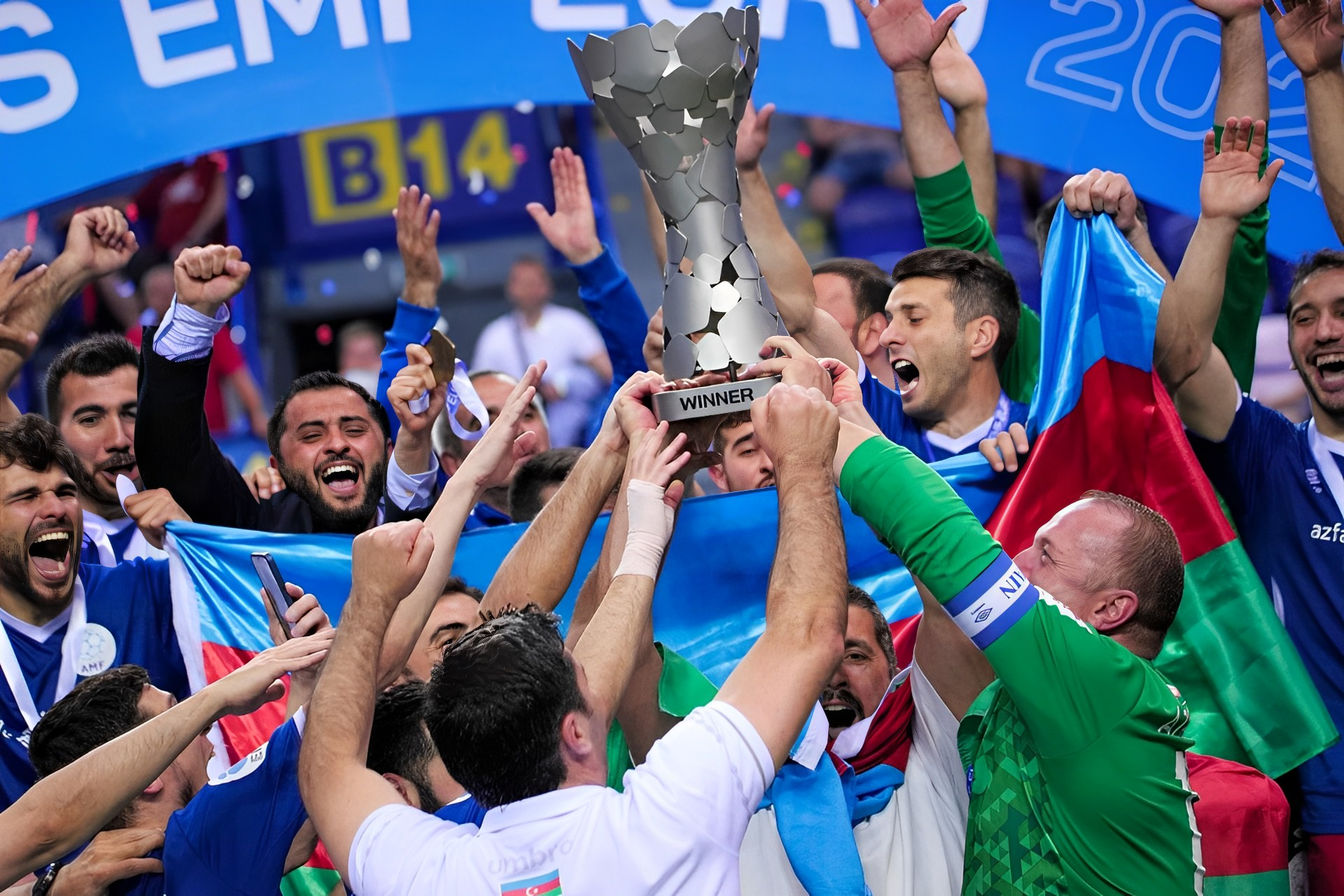

== Honours and awards ==
- 2022 European Championship
- 2025 World Mini Football Federation World Cup
- 2026 European Championship

== Team members ==
Kamran Abdullazadə, Mirkamil Əliyev, Elvin Əlizadə, Taleh Babayev, Xətai Bağırov, Ramiz Çovdarov, Vəli Qafarov, Ağaseyid Qasımov, Kamran Qurbatov, Samir Həmzəyev, Vüsal İsayev, Rəvan Kərimov, Məhəmməd Xəlilov, Təmkin Xəlilzadə, Mirmehdi Rzayev, Eşqin Tağıyev, Müseyyib Vəliyev

== See also ==
- WMF World Cup
- World Minifootball Federation
- Minifootball
