= Karen Israelyan =

Armenian footballer

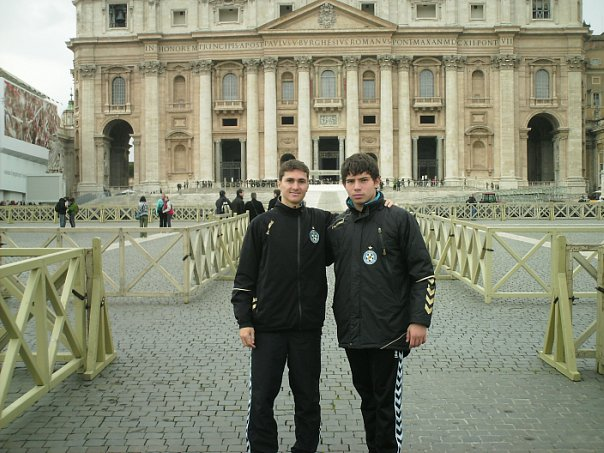

Personal information
- Full name: Karen Israelyan
- Date of birth: 26 March 1992 (age 34)
- Place of birth: Yerevan, Armenia
- Height: 1.84 m (6 ft 1/2 in)
- Position: Goalkeeper

Team information
- Current team: Ararat Yerevan
- Number: 12

Senior career*
Years	Team	Apps	(Gls)
2010–2011	FC Pyunik	32	(0)
2013–2014	Ulisses FC	12	(0)
2014–2015	Ararat Yerevan	4	(0)

International career^{‡}
2010–	Armenia U-21	7	(0)
2011	Armenia	1	(0)
- * Club domestic league appearances and goals as of 7 August 2011 ‡ National team caps and goals as of 10 August 2011

Karen Israelyan (Armenian: Կարեն Իսրայելյան, born on 26 March 1992 in Yerevan, Armenia) is an Armenian professional football goalkeeper. He is currently an unattached player. He last played for the Armenian Premier League club Ararat Yerevan. He was also a member of the Armenia U-21 and Armenia national teams.
