= 2025 WMF World Cup =

Minifootball tournament

2025 WMF Dünya Kuboku

Tournament details
- Host country: Azerbaijan
- Dates: 21 May – 1 June
- Teams: 32 (from 5 confederations)
- Venue: 1 (in 1 host city)

Final positions
- Champions: Azerbaijan (1st title)
- Runners-up: Hungary
- Third place: Serbia
- Fourth place: Montenegro

Tournament statistics
- Top scorer(s): (Czech Republic) Ondřej Paděra (7) (Portugal) Tiago Lapa (7)
- Best player: (Azerbaijan) Ramiz Çovdarov
- Best goalkeeper: (Serbia) Vladimir Bajić

The 2025 WMF World Cup was the fifth edition of the WMF World Cup, the biennial world championship for national minifootball teams organized by the World Minifootball Federation (WMF). The tournament was played in Baku in Azerbaijan between 21 May and 1 June 2025. Romania were the defending champions. Hosts Azerbaijan defeated Hungary 4–2 in the final, to win the title.

== Venue ==
All matches will take place at the National Gymnastics Arena in Baku, the capital of Azerbaijan.

Baku	2025 WMF World Cup is located in Azerbaijan
National Gymnastics Arena	2025 WMF World Cup is located in Azerbaijan
Capacity: 9,000	2025 WMF World Cup is located in Azerbaijan

== Teams ==
=== Participating nations ===
The tournament will feature 32 teams divided into eight groups. Teams will begin arriving in Baku for the tournament on 19 May. Teams of Bahrain, Chad, Indonesia, Israel, Mauritania, Poland, Slovenia, Turkey and Uzbekistan will compete in the WMF World Cup for the first time.

Qualifying tournament	Team	Total	First	Last	Previous best performance
African Minifootball Confederation (2024 African Minifootball Cup)	Chad	1st	Debut		
African Minifootball Confederation (2024 African Minifootball Cup)	~~Egypt~~	~~2nd~~	2023		Round of 16 (2019)
African Minifootball Confederation (2024 African Minifootball Cup)	Ghana	3rd	2019	2023	Round of 16 (2019)
African Minifootball Confederation (2024 African Minifootball Cup)	Mauritania	1st	Debut		
African Minifootball Confederation (2024 African Minifootball Cup)	~~South Africa~~	~~2nd~~	2019		Group stage (2019)
Asian Mini Football Championship	Bahrain	1st	Debut		
Asian Mini Football Championship	India	5th	2015	2023	Group stage (2015, 2017, 2019, 2023)
Asian Mini Football Championship	Thailand	3rd	2019	2023	Round of 16 (2023)
Asian Mini Football Championship	Uzbekistan	1st	Debut		
European Minifootball Federation	Azerbaijan	2nd	2023		Fourth place (2023)
European Minifootball Federation	Bosnia and Herzegovina	2nd	2017		Round of 16 (2017)
European Minifootball Federation	Bulgaria	2nd	2023		Round of 16 (2023)
European Minifootball Federation	Czechia	5th	2015	2023	Champions (2017)
European Minifootball Federation	England	3rd	2019	2023	Round of 16 (2023)
European Minifootball Federation	France	3rd	2017	2023	Quarter-finals (2017)
European Minifootball Federation	Georgia	2nd	2023		Round of 16 (2023)
European Minifootball Federation	Hungary	4th	2017	2023	Third place (2023)
European Minifootball Federation	Israel	1st	Debut		
European Minifootball Federation	Kazakhstan	4th	2015	2023	Runners-up (2023)
European Minifootball Federation	Montenegro	2nd	2023		Round of 16 (2023)
European Minifootball Federation	Poland	1st	Debut		
European Minifootball Federation	Portugal	4th	2017	2023	Round of 16 (2023)
European Minifootball Federation	Romania	5th	2015	2023	Champions (2023)
European Minifootball Federation	Serbia	4th	2015	2023	Round of 16 (2019)
European Minifootball Federation	Slovakia	3rd	2019	2023	Quarter-finals (2019, 2023)
European Minifootball Federation	Slovenia	1st	Debut		
European Minifootball Federation	Spain	3rd	2017	2023	Fourth place (2017)
European Minifootball Federation	Turkey	1st	Debut		
European Minifootball Federation	Ukraine	3rd	2019	2023	Quarter-finals (2019)
Panamerican Minifootball Federation	Costa Rica	1st	2019		Round of 16 (2019)
Panamerican Minifootball Federation	~~Mexico~~	~~5th~~	2015	2023	Champions (2019)
Panamerican Minifootball Federation	United States	5th	2015	2023	Champions (2015)
Wild cards	Argentina	3rd	2017	2019	Group stage (2017, 2019)
Wild cards	Indonesia	1st	Debut		
Wild cards	United Arab Emirates	2nd	2023		Quarter-finals (2023)

=== Draw ===
The draw for the group composition was held in Baku on 12 March 2025. The draw ceremony was attended by Qarabağ FK head coach Gurban Gurbanov, Zira FK head coach Rashad Sadigov, former player of the Azerbaijan minifootball team Seymur Mammadov, and Portuguese footballer Nani.

Egypt was eliminated from the tournament and replaced by the United Arab Emirates due to administrative problems, while South Africa was also eliminated and replaced by Argentina due to financial problems. Mexico withdrew from the tournament and was replaced by Indonesia.

Pot 1	Pot 2	Pot 3	Pot 4
Azerbaijan (Host); Romania; Kazakhstan; Serbia; Hungary; ~~Mexico~~ → Indonesia; Czech Republic; Slovakia	Bulgaria; Montenegro; United States; France; Ukraine; Georgia; Mauritania; Ghana	England; Portugal; Bosnia and Herzegovina; Thailand; ~~Egypt~~ → United Arab Emirates; Chad; Spain; Slovenia	Poland; India; Turkey; Costa Rica; Israel; Bahrain; Uzbekistan; ~~South Africa~~ → Argentina

== Group stage ==
=== Group A ===
Pos	Team	Pld	W	D	L	GF	GA	GD	Pts	Qualification
1	Azerbaijan (H)	3	2	1	0	7	1	+6	7	Advance to Knockout stage
2	Mauritania	3	1	1	1	3	3	0	4 (Note: Head-to-head: Mauritania 2–0 Bahrain)	Advance to Knockout stage
3	Bahrain	3	1	1	1	5	4	+1	4	
4	Slovenia	3	0	1	2	2	9	−7	1	

Source: WMF
(H) Hosts
Notes:
21 May 2025
21:45

Azerbaijan	1–1	Bahrain
Mirmehdi Rzayev 15'	Report	Ahmed Antar 25'

National Gymnastics Arena, Baku
21 May 2025
23:00

Mauritania	1–1	Slovenia
Mohamed Vall Kbeiduche 40'	Report	Mario Skuhala 30'

National Gymnastics Arena, Baku

23 May 2025
12:45

Mauritania	2–0	Bahrain
Mohamed Baghayoko 13', 30'	Report

National Gymnastics Arena, Baku
23 May 2025
20:45

Slovenia	0–4	Azerbaijan
	Report	Elvin Əlizadə 10'; Mirmehdi Rzayev 11'; Xətai Bağırov 25'; Kamran Abdullazadə 40'

National Gymnastics Arena, Baku

25 May 2025
14:00

Bahrain	4–1	Slovenia
Ahmed Antar 11'; Hasan Ahmed 40'; Ali Al-Araibi 44'; Salman Muhammad 45'	Report	Zoran Vuković 49'

National Gymnastics Arena, Baku
25 May 2025
19:30

Azerbaijan	2–0	Mauritania
Werzeg Betah 42' (o.g.); Ramiz Çovdarov 50+2'	Report

National Gymnastics Arena, Baku

=== Group B ===
Pos	Team	Pld	W	D	L	GF	GA	GD	Pts	Qualification
1	France	3	1	2	0	4	3	+1	5	Advance to Knockout stage
2	Romania	3	1	1	1	4	5	−1	4 (Note: Head-to-head: Romania 2–1 Uzbekistan)	Advance to Knockout stage
3	Uzbekistan	3	1	1	1	7	5	+2	4	
4	Chad	3	1	0	2	4	6	−2	3	

Source: WMF
Notes:
21 May 2025
9:15

France	1–0	Chad
Giovanni Calandrau 50+1'	Report

National Gymnastics Arena, Baku
21 May 2025
21:45

Romania	2–1	Uzbekistan
Constantin Dumitrașcu 2'; Andrei Șumălan 18'	Report	Asror Ruzmatov 5'

National Gymnastics Arena, Baku

23 May 2025
14:00

France	3–3	Uzbekistan
Skender Si Chaib 10'; Kévin Kistohurry 19'; Dylan Rozier 50'	Report	Doniyorbek Khasanov 3'; Asror Ruzmatov 8'; Elyor Omonjonov 41'

National Gymnastics Arena, Baku
23 May 2025
16:30

Chad	4–2	Romania
Ahmat Yacoub 20'; Brahim Ali 29', 41'; Sidik Moussa 50'	Report	Viorel Șaim 2'; Constantin Dumitrașcu 26'

National Gymnastics Arena, Baku

25 May 2025
12:45

Uzbekistan	3–0	Chad
Bekzod Mirsaidov 19'; Azizbek Temirov 35'; Akhror Umarjonov 39'	Report

National Gymnastics Arena, Baku
25 May 2025
22:00

Romania	0–0	France
	Report

National Gymnastics Arena, Baku

=== Group C ===
Pos	Team	Pld	W	D	L	GF	GA	GD	Pts	Qualification
1	England	3	2	1	0	8	1	+7	7	Advance to Knockout stage
2	Hungary	3	1	2	0	5	2	+3	5	Advance to Knockout stage
3	Turkey	3	1	1	1	4	5	−1	4	
4	Ukraine	3	0	0	3	1	10	−9	0	

Source: WMF
21 May 2025
10:30

Hungary	1–1	Turkey
Kövesdi Zsombor 4'	Report	Erdem Eriş 2'

National Gymnastics Arena, Baku
21 May 2025
13:00

Ukraine	0–4	England
	Report	Callam Gardner 15', 18'; Kristian Campbell 38'; Hafed Al-Droubi 31'

National Gymnastics Arena, Baku

23 May 2025
15:15

England	1–1	Hungary
Sam Fitzgerald 40'	Report	Tibor Kész 49'

National Gymnastics Arena, Baku
23 May 2025
19:30

Ukraine	1–3	Turkey
Vadym Ivanov 17'	Report	Emre Hacıeyüpoğlu 4', 7', 42'

National Gymnastics Arena, Baku

25 May 2025
16:30

Hungary	3–0	Ukraine
Zsombor Kövesdi 4'; Tibor Kész 40'; Miklós Barabás 44'	Report

National Gymnastics Arena, Baku
25 May 2025
18:15

Turkey	0–3	England
	Report	Mussa Bham 6', 43'; Sam Fitzgerald 21'

National Gymnastics Arena, Baku

=== Group D ===
Pos	Team	Pld	W	D	L	GF	GA	GD	Pts	Qualification
1	Portugal	3	3	0	0	13	2	+11	9	Advance to Knockout stage
2	Bulgaria	3	2	0	1	7	3	+4	6	Advance to Knockout stage
3	Slovakia	3	1	0	2	16	3	+13	3	
4	India	3	0	0	3	0	28	−28	0	

Source: WMF
21 May 2025
11:45

Bulgaria	1–3	Portugal
Fábio Lopes 33' (o.g.)	Report	Rafa Correia 9'; Tiago Lapa 32'; Edú Silva 38'

National Gymnastics Arena, Baku
21 May 2025
14:15

Slovakia	15–0	India
Dávid Guba 7', 8'; Jakub Straka 16', 25'; Martin Ďuráči 17'; Erik Jendrišek 20'; Dušan Dzíbela 31'; Milan Nestorik 32'; Jakub Hudec 35', 37', 43'; Daniel Filip Mašulovič 41'; Jaroslav Repa 45', 50'; Marek Blažej 46'	Report

National Gymnastics Arena, Baku

23 May 2025
18:15

Bulgaria	5–0	India
Iliya Petkov 20', 38'; Angel Rahov 40'; Momchil Kuzmanov 41'; Nikolay Marinov 46'	Report

National Gymnastics Arena, Baku
23 May 2025
22:00

Portugal	2–1	Slovakia
Tiago Lapa 1', 27'	Report	Jakub Straka 40'

National Gymnastics Arena, Baku

25 May 2025
15:15

India	0–8	Portugal
	Report	João Duarte 25'; Tiago Lapa 32', 38', 49'; Zé Campos 34', 42'; Francisco Silva 39'; Edú Silva 50'

National Gymnastics Arena, Baku
25 May 2025
20:45

Slovakia	0–1	Bulgaria
	Report	Nikolay Ivanov 34'

National Gymnastics Arena, Baku

=== Group E ===
Pos	Team	Pld	W	D	L	GF	GA	GD	Pts	Qualification
1	Montenegro	3	2	1	0	14	1	+13	7	Advance to Knockout stage
2	Thailand	3	2	1	0	9	2	+7	7	Advance to Knockout stage
3	Indonesia	3	1	0	2	1	8	−7	3	
4	Costa Rica	3	0	0	3	1	14	−13	0	

Source: WMF
22 May 2025
14:00

Indonesia	1–0	Costa Rica
Syarif Hidayatullah Sudarwin 30'	Report

National Gymnastics Arena, Baku
22 May 2025
15:15

Montenegro	1–1	Thailand
Nikola Popović 20'	Report	Thepmanee Nattapat 38'

National Gymnastics Arena, Baku

24 May 2025
19:30

Montenegro	9–0	Costa Rica
Miloš Pejaković 2', 34'; Rijad Dervišević 4'; Aleksandar Bošković 26'; Djuro Mugoša 29', 38'; 32' (o.g.); Darko Rajković 46'; Luka Savović 50'	Report

National Gymnastics Arena, Baku
24 May 2025
20:45

Thailand	4–0	Indonesia
Piomsawad Vipusana 9'; Rumkae Adisak 23'; Thepmanee Nattapat 44'; Pearpong Chaiyong 46'	Report

National Gymnastics Arena, Baku

26 May 2025
12:45

Costa Rica	1–4	Thailand
Jose Montero 13'	Report	Saengthong Tanet 8'; Pearpong Chaiyong 24'; Wonchiangrak Weerayut 32'; Theerakaew Issarawut 41'

National Gymnastics Arena, Baku
26 May 2025
17:00

Indonesia	0–4	Montenegro
	Report	Ivan Pejaković 1'; Rijad Dervišević 16'; Darko Rajković 33'; Luka Savović 49'

National Gymnastics Arena, Baku

=== Group F ===
Pos	Team	Pld	W	D	L	GF	GA	GD	Pts	Qualification
1	Bosnia and Herzegovina	3	1	2	0	6	4	+2	5	Advance to Knockout stage
2	Poland	3	1	2	0	3	2	+1	5	Advance to Knockout stage
3	Kazakhstan	3	1	1	1	7	6	+1	4	
4	United States	3	0	1	2	5	9	−4	1	

Source: WMF
22 May 2025
18:15

Kazakhstan	1–2	Poland
Dmitriy Dvirnyy 21'	Report	Artur Koschny 39'; Piotr Makowski 45'

National Gymnastics Arena, Baku
22 May 2025
19:30

United States	2–4	Bosnia and Herzegovina
Chad Vandegriffe 25'; Ian Bennett 50'	Report	Haris Medunjanin 21', 26', 50+1'; Kemal Čaušević 42'

National Gymnastics Arena, Baku

24 May 2025
14:00

United States	0–0	Poland
	Report

National Gymnastics Arena, Baku
24 May 2025
15:15

Bosnia and Herzegovina	1–1	Kazakhstan
Zhassulan Mustafin 22' (o.g.)	Report	Aibolat Adakhmanov 23'

National Gymnastics Arena, Baku

26 May 2025
16:30

Poland	1–1	Bosnia and Herzegovina
Damian Patoka 14'	Report	Ervin Zukanović 42'

National Gymnastics Arena, Baku
26 May 2025
20:45

Kazakhstan	5–3	United States
Alikhan Sairanov 8'; Ilya Burtovoy 49'; Akhat Zholshorin 10'; Aibolat Adakhmanov 16'; Dmitriy Dvirnyy 50'	Report	Justin Stinson 21', 43'; Jesus Pacheco 45'

National Gymnastics Arena, Baku

=== Group G ===
Pos	Team	Pld	W	D	L	GF	GA	GD	Pts	Qualification
1	Czech Republic	3	2	1	0	13	5	+8	7	Advance to Knockout stage
2	Georgia	3	2	1	0	10	3	+7	7	Advance to Knockout stage
3	United Arab Emirates	3	1	0	2	6	12	−6	3	
4	Argentina	3	0	0	3	3	12	−9	0	

Source: WMF
22 May 2025
16:30

Czech Republic	2–1	Argentina
Guillermo Faidutti 23' (o.g.); Ondřej Paděra 38'	Report	Guillermo Faidutti 34'

National Gymnastics Arena, Baku
22 May 2025
20:45

Georgia	2–0	United Arab Emirates
Gega Koshadze 24'; Nikoloz Koplatadze 29'	Report

National Gymnastics Arena, Baku

24 May 2025
16:30

Georgia	6–1	Argentina
Nikoloz Koplatadze 2', 39'; Giorgi Khabalaevi 3', 32'; Lasha-giorgi Oboladze 5'; Nikoloz Dadiani 35'	Report	Miguel Angel Cisneros 20' (pen.)

National Gymnastics Arena, Baku
24 May 2025
22:00

United Arab Emirates	2–9	Czech Republic
Ahmed Al-Saleh 1'; Mohamed Al-Suwaidi 2'	Report	Ondřej Paděra 1', 4', 10'; Richard Svoboda 3', 48'; Pavel Exner 11', 15'; Jaroslav Kubát 44'; Erik Burac 49'

National Gymnastics Arena, Baku

26 May 2025
15:15

Argentina	1–4	United Arab Emirates
Luciano Monserrat 6'	Report	Mohamed Khalil 7'; Saif Al-Rumeithi 34'; Rashed Masood 38'; Mohamed Al-Ali 48'

National Gymnastics Arena, Baku
26 May 2025
18:15

Czech Republic	2–2	Georgia
Tomáš Jelínek 39'; Ondřej Paděra 45'	Report	Gari Tsereteli 21'; Teimurazi Ekizashvili 30'

National Gymnastics Arena, Baku

=== Group H ===
Pos	Team	Pld	W	D	L	GF	GA	GD	Pts	Qualification
1	Serbia	3	3	0	0	9	2	+7	9	Advance to Knockout stage
2	Israel	3	2	0	1	8	5	+3	6	Advance to Knockout stage
3	Spain	3	1	0	2	6	8	−2	3	
4	Ghana	3	0	0	3	1	9	−8	0	

Source: WMF
22 May 2025
12:45

Ghana	0–3	Spain
	Report	Óscar Ortiz 1'; José Barreto 5'; Alexander García 44'

National Gymnastics Arena, Baku
22 May 2025
22:00

Serbia	3–0	Israel
Zarije Gojković 30'; Stefan Bosnić 38'; Marko Novaković 42'	Report

National Gymnastics Arena, Baku

24 May 2025
12:45

Ghana	0–4	Israel
	Report	Amir Abeles 9'; Ahmad Gabarin 19'; Yossef Sarusi 43', 45'

National Gymnastics Arena, Baku
24 May 2025
18:15

Spain	1–4	Serbia
Pablo Romero 49'	Report	Marko Živkucin 7'; Jovan Bobar 15', 28'; Stefan Bosnić 45'

National Gymnastics Arena, Baku

26 May 2025
13:00

Israel	4–2	Spain
Yossef Sarusi 9'; Adar Kalir 38'; Ahmad Gabarin 48'; Yuval Shabtay 49'	Report	Óscar Ortiz 27'; Pablo Romero 50+2'

National Gymnastics Arena, Baku
26 May 2025
19:30

Serbia	2–1	Ghana
Zarije Gojković 13'; Jovan Bobar 21'	Report	Bismark Amponsah 32'

National Gymnastics Arena, Baku

== Knockout stage ==
=== Bracket ===
Round of 16
27 May – Baku
England (p)	2 (3)
Bulgaria	2 (1)
27 May – Baku
Azerbaijan (p)	1 (2)
Romania	1 (1)
28 May – Baku
Montenegro	1
Poland	0
28 May – Baku
Czech Republic	4
Israel	1
27 May – Baku
Portugal	2
Hungary	3
27 May – Baku
France	0
Mauritania	1
28 May – Baku
Bosnia and Herzegovina	3
Thailand	1
28 May – Baku
Serbia	3
Georgia	2

Quarter-finals
29 May – Baku
England	1
Azerbaijan	2
29 May – Baku
Montenegro	1
Czech Republic	0
29 May – Baku
Hungary	1
Mauritania	0
29 May – Baku
Bosnia and Herzegovina	0
Serbia	5

Semi-finals
30 May – Baku
Azerbaijan	2
Montenegro	1
30 May – Baku
Hungary (p)	0 (3)
Serbia	0 (1)

Final
1 June – Baku
Azerbaijan	4
Hungary	2
Third-place match
1 June – Baku
Montenegro	0
Serbia	3

=== Round of 16 ===
27 May 2025
17:30

England	2–2	Bulgaria
Callum Gardner 37' (pen.), 42'	Report	Kristiyan Ivanov 38'; Danilo Vasov 50+2'
Penalties
Callum Gardner (penalty scored); Mussa Bham (penalty scored); Nicholas Wybrow (penalty scored)	3–1	(penalty missed) Nikolay Ivanov; (penalty scored) Denis Ivanov

National Gymnastics Arena, Baku

27 May 2025
19:00

Portugal	2–3	Hungary
Tiago Lapa 13'; Edu Rajão 37'	Report	Zsombor Kövesdi 16'; Robin Koppermann 31', 45'

National Gymnastics Arena, Baku

27 May 2025
20:30

Azerbaijan	1–1	Romania
Ramiz Çovdarov 33'	Report	Alin Robu 13'
Penalties
Elvin Əlizadə (penalty scored); Təmkin Xəlilzadə (penalty scored)	2–1	(penalty scored) Marius Balogh; (penalty missed) Alin Robu; (penalty missed) Cătălin Tineiu

National Gymnastics Arena, Baku

27 May 2025
22:00

France	0–1	Mauritania
	Report	Moustapha Soueidi 1'

National Gymnastics Arena, Baku

28 May 2025
17:30

Montenegro	1–0	Poland
Darko Rajković 39'	Report

National Gymnastics Arena, Baku

28 May 2025
19:00

Bosnia and Herzegovina	3–1	Thailand
Kemal Čaušević 44', 48'; Haris Medunjanin 50'	Report	Saengthong Tanet 2'

National Gymnastics Arena, Baku

28 May 2025
20:30

Czech Republic	4–1	Israel
Ondřej Paděra 5', 48'; Richard Svoboda 33'; Pavel Exner 37'	Report	Ahmad Gabarin 49'

National Gymnastics Arena, Baku

28 May 2025
22:00

Serbia	3–2	Georgia
Nikola Tomić 6'; Žarko Matić 25'; Jovan Bobar 40'	Report	Giorgi Qurdadze 11' (pen.); Giorgi Aptsiauri 41'

National Gymnastics Arena, Baku

=== Quarter-finals ===
29 May 2025
17:30

Hungary	1–0	Mauritania
Barnabás Győri 23'	Report

National Gymnastics Arena, Baku

29 May 2025
19:00

Montenegro	1–0	Czech Republic
Rijad Dervišević 39'	Report

National Gymnastics Arena, Baku

29 May 2025
20:30

England	1–2	Azerbaijan
Mussa Bham 35'	Report	Təmkin Xəlilzadə 14'; Sam Fitzgerald 48' (o.g.)

National Gymnastics Arena, Baku

29 May 2025
22:00

Bosnia and Herzegovina	0–5	Serbia
	Report	Davor Popović 2'; Stefan Bosnić 18', 44'; Marko Vujović 30'; Nikola Tomič 50'

National Gymnastics Arena, Baku

=== Semi-finals ===
30 May 2025
20:00

Azerbaijan	2–1	Montenegro
Ağaseyid Qasımov 23'; Ramiz Çovdarov 44'	Report	Nikola Radonjić 30'

National Gymnastics Arena, Baku

30 May 2025
21:30

Hungary	0–0	Serbia
	Report
Penalties
Tibor Kész (penalty scored); Balázs Bényei (penalty scored); Zsombor Kövesdi (penalty scored)	3–1	(penalty missed) Veselin Guberinić; (penalty scored) Žarko Matić

National Gymnastics Arena, Baku

=== Third-place match ===
1 June 2025
18:00

Montenegro	0–3	Serbia
	Report	Žarko Matić 21'; Zarije Gojković 25'; Veselin Guberinić 50+3'

National Gymnastics Arena, Baku

=== Final ===
1 June 2025
20:00

Azerbaijan	4–2	Hungary
Təmkin Xəlilzadə 2'; Məhəmməd Xəlilov 8'; Ravan Kərimov 10', 29'	Report	Jsombor Kövesdi 11'; Bence Lovász 50'

National Gymnastics Arena, Baku

== Awards ==
The following awards were given at the conclusion of the tournament:

Best Player
(Azerbaijan) Ramiz Çovdarov
Top Scorer
(Czech Republic) Ondřej Paděra
(Portugal) Tiago Lapa
(7 goals)
Best goalkeeper
(Serbia) Vladimir Bajić

== Top scorers ==
Rank	Player	Nation	Goals
1	Ondřej Paděra	Czech Republic	7
1	Tiago Lapa	Portugal	7
2	Zsombor Kövesdi	Hungary	5
3	Rijad Dervišević	Montenegro	4
3	Jovan Bobar	Serbia	4
3	Haris Medunjanin	Bosnia and Herzegovina	4
3	Stefan Bosnić	Serbia	4
3	Callum Gardner	England	4
