= 2015 EMF miniEURO =

Tournament details
- Host country: Croatia
- Dates: 21–27 September
- Teams: 32
- Venue(s): 1 (in 1 host city)

Final positions
- Champions: Romania (6th title)
- Runners-up: Croatia
- Third place: Bosnia and Herzegovina
- Fourth place: Czech Republic

Tournament statistics
- Top scorer(s): (Bosnia and Herzegovina) Vujica Marko (7)

The 2015 EMF miniEuro was the sixth edition of the EMF miniEURO for national Small-sided football teams, and the fourth governed by the European Minifootball Federation. It was hosted in Vrsar, Croatia, from 21 to 27 September 2015.

The final tournament was contested by 32 teams.

== Draw ==
The final tournament draw was held in Vrsar on 15 June 2015.

== Group stage ==
Key to colours in group tables
Team advanced to the knockout stage

=== Group A ===
Team	Pld	W	D	L	GF	GA	GD	Pts
Croatia	3	3	0	0	13	2	+11	9
Israel	3	2	0	1	9	3	+6	6
Lithuania	3	1	0	2	9	11	−2	3
Luxembourg	3	0	0	3	1	16	−15	0

21 September 2015
20:00

Croatia	7–1	Lithuania
Željko Šimić 6'; Mario Orlović 14'; Alen Herceg 19'; Tin Prpić 24'; Zoran Lukavečki (yellow card) 27' (goal) 30'; Stjepan Korenika 37'; Šimun Popov 38'	Report	Darius Pupliauskas 38'

Vrsar
21 September 2015
22:00

Israel	5–0	Luxembourg
Sharon Adani 3'; Omer Shifman 10' (yellow card) 33'; Alek Stunis 20' ? 30'; Roei Amsalem 32'	Report	Fabio Ferreira (yellow card) 29'

Vrsar

22 September 2015
14:00

Israel	3–1	Lithuania
Liran Yahav (yellow card) 11'; Alek Stunis 17', 34'; Amit Sharabi 20'	Report	Tautvydas Bagonas 11'

Vrsar
22 September 2015
20:00

Croatia	4:0	Luxembourg
Tin Prpić 5'; Ivan Smok 26'; Željko Šimić 26'; Aleksandar Korenika (yellow card) 32'; Mario Orlović 33'	Report

Vrsar

24 September 2015
20:00

Croatia	2:1	Israel
Ivan Smok 21'; Željko Šimić 34'	Report	Amit Kamhazi 2'; Liran Yahav (yellow card) 8'

Vrsar
25 September 2015
9:00

Lithuania	7:1	Luxembourg
Artur Plesakov 2', 35' Tautvydas Bagonas 9', 36'; Justinas Zagurskas 13' Artur Juchno 25', 34'	Report	Christopher Da Graga 6'

Vrsar

=== Group B ===
Team	Pld	W	D	L	GF	GA	GD	Pts
Romania	3	3	0	0	6	0	+6	9
Scotland	3	1	1	1	7	5	+2	4
Serbia	3	0	2	1	4	6	−2	2
Bulgaria	3	0	1	2	4	10	−6	1

22 September 2015
10:00

Bulgaria	2–2	Serbia
Zaprin Golachki 00:08', 00:14'	Report	Nikola Mandić 00:07'; Nenad Stefanović 00:19'; Igor Jančevski (yellow card) 00:22'

Vrsar
22 September 2015
17:00

Romania	1–0	Scotland
Ciprian Ursu 8' (yellow card) 14'; Mircea Popa (yellow card) 33'	Report	Blair Steele (yellow card) 20'; Lee Wells (yellow card) 26'

Vrsar

23 September 2015
10:00

Bulgaria	2–5	Scotland
Zaprin Golachki 2'; Yordan Mihaylov (yellow card) 22'; Spas Milushev 35'; Ivan Hamalski (yellow card) 38'	Report	Joe Andrew 12', 13'; Chris Malone 26', 33'; Iain Anderson 37'; Sean McIntyre (yellow card) 38'

Vrsar
23 September 2015
14:00

Romania	2–0	Serbia
Adrian Calugareanu 19', 40'	Report	Dalibor Kecman (yellow card) 36'

Vrsar

24 September 2015
12:00

Scotland	2–2	Serbia
Lee Wells (yellow card) 7'; Radomir Sekulić 34' (o.g); Iain Anderson 39'	Report	Radomir Sekulić 1'; Nenad Stefanović 40'

Vrsar
24 September 2015
15:00

Romania	3–0	Bulgaria
Ionut Marian 2'; Gabriel Tanase 7'; Ciprian Bucovanu 26'	Report	Ivan Hamalski (yellow card) 25'

Vrsar

=== Group C ===
Team	Pld	W	D	L	GF	GA	GD	Pts
Slovakia	3	1	2	0	4	3	+1	5
England	3	1	2	0	4	3	+1	5
Portugal	3	1	1	1	5	5	0	4
Latvia	3	0	1	2	2	4	−2	1

22 September 2015
15:00

England	3–2	Portugal
Bradley Wadkins (yellow card) 3'; Kirk Herbert 27', 36'; Mo Hashi 33' (yellow card) 39'; George Isaac (yellow card) 37'	Report	David Fernandes 23'; João Antunes 31'

Vrsar
22 September 2015
22:00

Slovakia	2–1	Latvia
Rudolf Beliš 6'; Erik Szabo 32'	Report	Andrejs Sitiks 35'

Vrsar

23 September 2015
12:00

England	0–0	Latvia
Callam Gardner (yellow card) 9'; Sam Kanani (yellow card) 16'; Ben Long (yellow card) 39'	Report	Gatis Rožkalns (yellow card) 34'

Vrsar
25 September 2015
10:00

Slovakia	1–1	Portugal
Filip Bednár (yellow card) 20'; Juraj Stašiak 27'; Erik Szabo (yellow card) 37'; Félix Ľudovít 40'	Report	José Carlos Ferreira 20'; Carlos Vieira (yellow card) 37'

Vrsar

24 September 2015
13:00

Latvia	1–2	Portugal
Gatis Rožkalns 14'; Ainārs Daudziešans (yellow card) 40'	Report	José Carlos Ferreira 19'; João Antunes 28' (yellow card) 32'; Luís Osório (yellow card) 38'; Pedro Bernardo (yellow card) 39'; José Afonso (yellow card) 40'

Vrsar
24 September 2015
17:00

Slovakia	1–1	England
Ľudovít Félix 13'	Report	Sam Kanani 16'; George Isaac (yellow card) 34'

Vrsar

=== Group D ===
Team	Pld	W	D	L	GF	GA	GD	Pts
Italy	1	1	0	0	3	1	+2	3
Moldova	2	0	0	2	3	8	−5	0
Slovenia	1	1	0	0	5	2	+3	3
Hungary	0	0	0	0	0	0	0	0

24 September 2015
18:00

Moldova	2–5	Slovenia
Stanislav luca 00:28'; Serghei Leporeanu 00:38'		Darko Zorko 00:04'; Marko Karnet 00:24'; 00:33'; Matej Rogač 00:36'; Jure Kandare 00:37'

=== Group E ===
Team	Pld	W	D	L	GF	GA	GD	Pts
Czech Republic	1	1	0	0	2	1	+1	3
Spain	1	0	0	1	1	2	−1	0
Greece	0	0	0	0	0	0	0	0
Belgium	0	0	0	0	0	0	0	0

22 September 2015
11:00

Czech Republic	2–1	Spain
Patrik Levčík 00:04'; Jaroslav Černý (yellow card) 00:34'; Čeněk Cenek 00:38'; Jaroslav Procházka (yellow card) 00:39'	Report	Luis Alberto Martínez Pelaez 00:14'; Mario Santos Fuentes (yellow card) 00:39'

=== Group F ===
Team	Pld	W	D	L	GF	GA	GD	Pts
Bosnia and Herzegovina	3	2	1	0	7	1	+6	7
Germany	3	2	1	0	5	1	+4	7
Kazakhstan	3	1	0	2	4	8	−4	3
Wales	3	0	0	3	2	8	−6	0

22 September 2015
9:00

Kazakhstan	1–4	Bosnia and Herzegovina
Daniyar Kenzhegulov 00:40'	Report	Andreas Berović 00:08'; Marko Vujica 00:33', 00:38', 00:40'

23 September 2015
9:00

Germany	0–0	Bosnia and Herzegovina
	Report

24 September 2015
9:00

Wales Wales	0–3	Bosnia and Herzegovina
	Report

=== Group G ===
Team	Pld	W	D	L	GF	GA	GD	Pts
Poland	1	1	0	0	6	0	+6	3
France	1	0	0	1	0	6	−6	0
Montenegro	0	0	0	0	0	0	0	0
Cyprus	0	0	0	0	0	0	0	0

22 September 2015
12:00

Poland	6–0	France
Christian Tomyk 00:02', 00:12'; Mateusz Gliński 00:08'; Bartłomiej Dębicki 00:16'; Marcin Grzywa 00:30'; Przemysław Kotlarz 00:38'	Report

=== Group H ===
Team	Pld	W	D	L	GF	GA	GD	Pts
Russia	1	1	0	0	5	1	+4	3
Ireland	1	1	0	0	1	0	+1	3
Turkey	1	0	0	1	0	1	−1	0
Austria	1	0	0	1	1	5	−4	0

21 September 2015
21:00

Turkey	0–1	Ireland
	Report	James Timmons 00:39'; Ian Bryne (yellow card) 00:44'

21 September 2015
23:00

Russia	5–1	Austria
Evgeny Aldonin 00:03', 00:15'; Viktor Bukievsky 00:13'; Alexandr Kuksov 00:27'; Vladimir Chitaya 00:28'	Report	Mesut Ünal 00:11'

== Knockout stage ==
The knockout stage matches, which includes quarter-finals, semi-finals, third place play-off and the final, were all played on 25 and 26 September 2015. If a match is drawn after 40 minutes of regular play, a penalty shoot-out is used to determine the winner.

=== Bracket ===
Round of 16
Croatia	3
Scotland [	0
England ]	0 (5)
Hungary	0 (6)
Spain	1 (2)
Bosnia and Herzegovina	1 (3)
Poland	3
Austria	1
Czech Republic	3
Germany	1
Montenegro	2
Russia	3
Slovakia	1
Slovenia	2
Israel	0
Romania	2

Quarter-finals
Croatia ]	1
Hungary	0
Bosnia and Herzegovina	2 (2)
Poland	2 (0)
Czech Republic '	3
Russia	1
Slovenia	1
Romania	4

Semi-finals
Bosnia and Herzegovina	1 (2)
Croatia	1 (3)
Czech Republic	1 (1)
Romania	1 (2)

Final
Romania	5
Croatia	1
Third place
Bosnia and Herzegovina	4
Czech Republic	3

== Final ranking ==
Pos	Team	Pld	W	D	L	Pts	Result
1	Romania	7	6	1	0	19	1st
2	Croatia	7	5	1	1	16	2nd
3	Bosnia and Herzegovina	7	3	4	0	13	3rd
4	Czech Republic	7	4	2	1	14	4th
5	Russia	5	4	0	1	12	
6	Hungary	5	3	1	1	10	
7	Poland	5	3	1	1	10	
8	Slovenia	5	3	1	1	10	
=9	Israel	4	2	2	0	8	
=9	Montenegro	4	2	2	0	8	
11	Austria	4	2	2	0	8	
12	Spain	4	2	1	1	7	
13	Germany	4	2	1	1	7	
14	England	4	1	3	0	6	
15	Slovakia	4	1	2	1	5	
16	Scotland	4	1	1	2	4	
17	France	3	2	0	1	6	Eliminated in the group stage
18	Portugal	3	1	1	1	4	Eliminated in the group stage
19	Greece	3	1	1	1	4	Eliminated in the group stage
20	Lithuania	3	1	0	2	3	Eliminated in the group stage
21	Ireland	3	1	0	2	3	Eliminated in the group stage
22	Kazakhstan	3	1	0	2	3	Eliminated in the group stage
23	Italy	3	1	0	2	3	Eliminated in the group stage
24	Serbia	3	0	2	1	2	Eliminated in the group stage
25	Latvia	3	0	1	2	1	Eliminated in the group stage
26	Bulgaria	3	0	1	2	1	Eliminated in the group stage
27	Turkey	3	0	0	3	0	Eliminated in the group stage
=28	Cyprus	3	0	0	3	0	Eliminated in the group stage
=28	Wales	3	0	0	3	0	Eliminated in the group stage
=28	Moldova	3	0	0	3	0	Eliminated in the group stage
31	Belgium	3	0	0	3	0	Eliminated in the group stage
32	Liechtenstein	3	0	0	3	0	Eliminated in the group stage
