= 2022 EMF EURO =

Tournament details
- Host country: Slovakia
- Dates: 4–11 June
- Teams: 24
- Venue: 1 (in 1 host city)

Final positions
- Champions: Azerbaijan (1st title)
- Runners-up: Romania
- Third place: Bulgaria
- Fourth place: Kazakhstan

Tournament statistics
- Matches played: 52

The 2022 EMF Euro is the tenth edition of the EMF miniEURO for national Small-sided football teams, and the fifth governed by the European Minifootball Federation. It takes place in Košice, Slovakia, from 4 to 11 June 2022.

The final tournament includes 24 teams.

== Group stage ==
Key to colours in group tables
Team advanced to the knockout stage

=== Group A ===
Pos	Team	Pld	W	D	L	GF	GA	GD	Pts	Qualification
1	Slovakia (H)	3	2	1	0	7	1	+6	7	Knockout stage
2	Italy	3	1	1	1	6	8	−2	4	Knockout stage
3	Belgium	3	1	0	2	6	7	−1	3	Eliminated
4	Poland	3	1	0	2	5	8	−3	3	Eliminated

Source: https://emfeuro.eu/kosice-2349/group-matches-en
(H) Hosts
4 June 2022
10:30

Italy	1-4	Poland
Bruno Pio Scordino 38'	Report	Dawid Brewczyński 22'; Kamil Jurga 25'; Krystian Nowakowski 28'; Tomasz Kruczyński 50'

Steel Aréna, Košice
4 June 2022
20:15

Slovakia	2-0	Belgium
Lukáš Janič 44'; Dušan Dzíbela 51'	Report

Steel Aréna, Košice
1. Italy 1 - 4 Poland
2. Slovakia 2 - 0 Belgium
3. Belgium 3 - 1 Poland
4. Slovakia 1 - 1 Italy
5. Italy 4 - 3 Belgium
6. Slovakia 4 - 0 Poland

=== Group B ===
Pos	Team	Pld	W	D	L	GF	GA	GD	Pts	Qualification
1	Romania	3	3	0	0	10	2	+8	9	Knockout stage
2	Azerbaijan	3	2	0	1	6	3	+3	6	Knockout stage
3	Spain	3	0	1	2	2	10	−8	1	Eliminated
4	Albania	3	0	1	2	1	4	−3	1	Eliminated

Source: https://emfeuro.eu/kosice-2349/group-matches-en
1. Romania 2-0 Azerbaijan
2. Spain 0-0 Albania
3. Spain 1-5 Azerbaijan
4. Romania 3-1 Albania
5. Albania 0-1 Azerbaijan
6. Romania 5-1 Spain

=== Group C ===
Pos	Team	Pld	W	D	L	GF	GA	GD	Pts	Qualification
1	Montenegro	3	2	0	1	8	5	+3	6	Knockout stage
2	Bulgaria	3	2	0	1	7	4	+3	6	Knockout stage
3	Georgia	3	2	0	1	5	3	+2	6	Knockout stage
4	Austria	3	0	0	3	4	12	−8	0	Eliminated

Source: https://emfeuro.eu/kosice-2349/group-matches-en
1. Bulgaria 4-1 Austria
2. Montenegro 0-2 Georgia
3. Montenegro 5-2 Austria
4. Bulgaria 2-0 Georgia
5. Austria 1-3 Georgia
6. Montenegro 3-1 Bulgaria

=== Group D ===
Pos	Team	Pld	W	D	L	GF	GA	GD	Pts	Qualification
1	Ukraine	3	2	1	0	10	3	+7	7	Knockout stage
2	Hungary	3	2	0	1	13	2	+11	6	Knockout stage
3	Portugal	3	1	1	1	7	8	−1	4	Knockout stage
4	Turkey	3	0	0	3	2	19	−17	0	Eliminated

Source: https://emfeuro.eu/kosice-2349/group-matches-en
1. Hungary 5-0 Portugal
2. Hungary 0-2 Ukraine
3. Turkey 1-5 Portugal
4. Ukraine 6-1 Turkey
5. Hungary 8-0 Turkey
6. Ukraine 2-2 Portugal

=== Group E ===
Pos	Team	Pld	W	D	L	GF	GA	GD	Pts	Qualification
1	Serbia	3	2	1	0	8	3	+5	7	Knockout stage
2	Czech Republic	3	1	1	1	6	6	0	4	Knockout stage
3	France	3	1	1	1	5	5	0	4	Knockout stage
4	Moldova	3	0	1	2	3	8	−5	1	Eliminated

Source: https://emfeuro.eu/kosice-2349/group-matches-en
1. Serbia 1-1 Moldova
2. Czech Republic 1-1 France
3. Serbia 3-1 France
4. Czech Republic 4-1 Moldova
5. Moldova 1-3 France
6. Czech Republic 1-4 Serbia

=== Group F ===
Pos	Team	Pld	W	D	L	GF	GA	GD	Pts	Qualification
1	England	3	2	0	1	4	3	+1	6	Knockout stage
2	Israel	3	2	0	1	10	6	+4	6	Knockout stage
3	Kazakhstan	3	1	1	1	6	8	−2	4	Knockout stage
4	Greece	3	0	1	2	4	7	−3	1	Eliminated

Source: https://emfeuro.eu/kosice-2349/group-matches-en
1. England 2-1 Israel
2. England 1-0 Greece
3. Kazakhstan 2-5 Israel
4. Kazakhstan 2-1 England
5. Israel 4-2 Greece
6. Kazakhstan 2-2 Greece

== Knockout stage ==
=== Bracket ===
Round of 16
8 June, 20:15
Slovakia	2
Georgia	0
8 June, 10:30
Azerbaijan	3
Israel	0
8 June, 12:00
Serbia	1 (1)
Hungary	1 (3)
8 June, 13:30
Montenegro	3 (2)
Kazakhstan	3 (3)
8 June, 15:30
Ukraine	0
France	1
8 June, 17:00
Italy	1
Bulgaria	2
8 June, 18:30
Romania	7
Portugal	0
8 June, 22:00
England	0
Czech Republic	1

Quarter-finals
9 June, 20:15
Slovakia	0
Azerbaijan	1
9 June, 17:00
Hungary	1 (2)
Kazakhstan	1 (3)
9 June, 18:30
France	1
Bulgaria	3
9 June, 22:00
Romania	0 (2)
Czech Republic	0 (1)

Semi-finals
10 June, 18:30
Azerbaijan	3
Kazakhstan	2
10 June, 20:15
Bulgaria	0 (3)
Romania	0 (4)

Final
11 June, 20:15
Azerbaijan	1
Romania	0
Third place
11 June, 18:00
Bulgaria	4
Kazakhstan	1

=== Round of 16 ===
8 June 2022
10:30

Azerbaijan	3–0	Israel
Mirmehdi Rzayev 8'; Elvin Alizada 47'; Davud Karimi 48'	Report

Steel Aréna, Košice
8 June 2022
12:00

Serbia	1–1 (penalties: 1–3)	Hungary
Čedomir Tomčić 40'	Report	Roland József Juhász 28'

Steel Aréna, Košice
8 June 2022
13:30

Montenegro	3–3 (penalties: 2–3)	Kazakhstan
Ivan Mijušković 10'; Bogoljub Komatina 10'; Nikola Mijović 20'	Report	Ulan Zhaksylykov 13'; Mardan Tolebek 37'; Shakhrur Khashimov 39'

Steel Aréna, Košice
8 June 2022
15:30

Ukraine	0–1	France
	Report	Landi Renaud 48'

Steel Aréna, Košice
8 June 2022
17:00

Italy	1–2	Bulgaria
Yuri Bacoli 40'	Report	Angel Rahov 28'; Lyubomir Genchev 50'

Steel Aréna, Košice
8 June 2022
18:30

Romania	7–0	Portugal
Ionut Chetan 5'; Andrei Victor Moldovan 22' 25' 31'; Mircea Ciprian Ungur 23'; Andrei Catalin Ferik 39' 44'	Report

Steel Aréna, Košice
8 June 2022
20:15

Slovakia	2–0	Georgia
Dušan Dzíbela 14'; Adam Bombicz 50'	Report

Steel Aréna, Košice
8 June 2022
22:00

England	0–1	Czech Republic
	Report	Tomáš Pospiš 20'

Steel Aréna, Košice

=== Quarter-finals ===
9 June 2022
17:00

Hungary	1–1 (penalties: 2–3)	Kazakhstan
Máté Suscsák 45'	Report	Ulan Zhaksylykov 37'

Steel Aréna, Košice
9 June 2022
18:30

France	1–3	Bulgaria
Bouvet Frédéric 50'	Report	Miroslav Kayryakov 3'; Svetlozar Tabakov 31'; Angel Rahov 45'

Steel Aréna, Košice
9 June 2022
20:15

Slovakia	0–1	Azerbaijan
	Report	Elvin Alizada 42'

Steel Aréna, Košice
9 June 2022
22:00

Romania	0–0 (penalties: 2–1)	Czech Republic
	Report

Steel Aréna, Košice

=== Semi-finals ===
10 June 2022
18:30

Azerbaijan	3–2	Kazakhstan
Bakhtiyar Soltanov 18'; Tural Narmanov 26'; Samir Hamzayev 32'		Shakhrur Khashimov 11'; Medet Kudaibergenov 20'

Steel Aréna, Košice
10 June 2022
20:15

Bulgaria	0–0 (penalties: 3–4)	Romania

Steel Aréna, Košice

=== Bronze medal game ===
11 June 2022
18:00

Kazakhstan	1–4	Bulgaria
Nauryz Ashenov 31'		Nikola Pramatarov 23'; Angel Rahov 30'; Spas Milushev 47'; Denis Ivanov 50'

Steel Aréna, Košice

=== Final ===
11 June 2022
20:15

Azerbaijan	1–0	Romania
Seymur Mammadov 25'

Steel Aréna, Košice

== Final ranking ==
Pos	Team	Pld	W	D	L	GF	GA	GD	Pts	Result
1	Azerbaijan	7	6	0	1	14	5	+9	18	1st
2	Romania	7	4	2	1	17	3	+14	14	2nd
3	Bulgaria	7	5	1	1	16	7	+9	16	3rd
4	Kazakhstan	7	1	3	3	13	19	−6	6	4th
5	Slovakia	5	3	1	1	9	2	+7	10	Eliminated in the quarter-finals
6	Hungary	5	2	2	1	15	4	+11	8	Eliminated in the quarter-finals
7	Czech Republic	5	2	2	1	7	6	+1	8	Eliminated in the quarter-finals
8	France	5	2	1	2	7	8	−1	7	Eliminated in the quarter-finals
9	Serbia	4	2	2	0	9	4	+5	8	Eliminated in the round of 16
10	Ukraine	4	2	1	1	10	4	+6	7	Eliminated in the round of 16
11	Montenegro	4	2	1	1	11	8	+3	7	Eliminated in the round of 16
12	Israel	4	2	0	2	10	9	+1	6	Eliminated in the round of 16
13	Georgia	4	2	0	2	5	5	0	6	Eliminated in the round of 16
14	England	4	2	0	2	4	4	0	6	Eliminated in the round of 16
15	Italy	4	1	1	2	7	10	−3	4	Eliminated in the round of 16
16	Portugal	4	1	1	2	7	15	−8	4	Eliminated in the round of 16
17	Belgium	3	1	0	2	6	7	−1	3	Eliminated in the group stage
18	Poland	3	1	0	2	5	8	−3	3	Eliminated in the group stage
19	Greece	3	0	1	2	4	7	−3	1	Eliminated in the group stage
20	Albania	3	0	1	2	1	4	−3	1	Eliminated in the group stage
21	Moldova	3	0	1	2	3	8	−5	1	Eliminated in the group stage
22	Spain	3	0	1	2	2	10	−8	1	Eliminated in the group stage
23	Austria	3	0	0	3	4	12	−8	0	Eliminated in the group stage
24	Turkey	3	0	0	3	2	19	−17	0	Eliminated in the group stage
