= 2014 EMF miniEURO =

Tournament details
- Host country: Montenegro
- Dates: 26–30 November
- Teams: 24
- Venue: 1 (in 1 host city)

Final positions
- Champions: Romania (5th title)
- Runners-up: Slovenia
- Third place: Czech Republic
- Fourth place: Germany

Tournament statistics
- Matches played: 52
- Goals scored: 227 (4.37 per match)
- Top scorer: (Scotland) Joe Andrew (9)

The 2014 EMF miniEuro was the 5th edition of the EMF miniEURO for national Small-sided football teams. It was hosted in Herceg Novi, Montenegro, from 26 to 30 November 2014.

The final tournament was contested by 24 teams. The matches were played in one venue in the town of Igalo, Herceg Novi Municipality at the Sport Center Igalo.

The defending champions, Romania, kept their title by overcoming Slovenia 1–0 in the final.

== Draw ==
The final tournament draw was held at the Igalo Spa Hotel, in Igalo, Montenegro on 15 October 2014.

== Group stage ==
In the group stage, a total of 36 matches (six matches per group) were played between 26 and 28 November, the teams finishing in the top two positions in each of the six groups progressed to the knockout stage, along with the best four third-placed teams.

If two or more teams are equal on points on completion of the group matches (including in determining the best third-placed teams), the following tie-breaking criteria are applied:

1. Result of the match(es) played among the teams in question;
2. Superior goal difference in all group matches;
3. Higher number of goals scored in all group matches;
4. Higher number of wins in all group matches;
5. Position in the EMF ranking system;
6. Difficulty of opponents (according to the EMF ranking system);
7. Draw.

Key to colours in group tables
Team advanced to the knockout stage

=== Group A ===
Team	Pld	W	D	L	GF	GA	GD	Pts
Croatia	3	3	0	0	12	3	+9	9
Kazakhstan	3	1	1	1	7	2	+5	4
Italy	3	0	2	1	4	5	−1	2
Ireland	3	0	1	2	4	17	−13	1

26 November 2014
Croatia	2-1	Italy
27 November 2014
Kazakhstan	6–0	Ireland
Ireland	2–9	Croatia
Italy	1–1	Kazakhstan
27 November 2014
Italy	2–2	Ireland
Croatia	1–0	Kazakhstan

=== Group B ===
Team	Pld	W	D	L	GF	GA	GD	Pts
Poland	3	2	1	0	8	4	+4	7
Slovakia	3	1	2	0	7	6	+1	5
Bulgaria	3	0	2	1	5	6	−1	2
Wales	3	0	1	2	3	7	−4	1

27 November 2014
Bulgaria	2–3	Poland
Slovakia	3–2	Wales
28 November 2014
Poland	2–2	Slovakia
Wales	1–1	Bulgaria
Slovakia	2–2	Bulgaria
Poland	3–0	Wales

=== Group C ===
Team	Pld	W	D	L	GF	GA	GD	Pts
Romania	3	3	0	0	11	1	+10	9
Greece	3	1	1	1	5	1	+4	4
Slovenia	3	1	1	1	6	4	+2	4
Lithuania	3	0	0	3	2	18	−16	0

27 November 2014
Greece	5–0	Lithuania
Romania	2–1	Slovenia
Greece	0–0	Slovenia
Lithuania	0–8	Romania
28 November 2012
Slovenia	5–2	Lithuania
Romania	1–0	Greece

=== Group D ===
Team	Pld	W	D	L	GF	GA	GD	Pts
Montenegro	3	3	0	0	13	7	+6	9
Moldova	3	2	0	1	10	7	+3	6
Scotland	3	1	0	2	7	10	−3	3
Israel	3	0	0	3	5	11	−6	0

26 November 2014
Montenegro	3–2	Scotland
Israel	1–2	Moldova
27 November 2014
Moldova	4–1	Scotland
Montenegro	5–1	Israel
28 November 2014
Scotland	4–3	Israel
Montenegro	5–4	Moldova

=== Group E ===
Team	Pld	W	D	L	GF	GA	GD	Pts
Spain	3	2	1	0	8	2	+6	7
Czech Republic	3	2	0	1	9	4	+5	6
England	3	1	0	2	4	8	−4	3
Turkey	3	0	1	2	4	11	−7	1

26 November 2014
Czech Republic	0–3	Spain
27 November 2014
Turkey	2–3	England
Czech Republic	2–0	England
Spain	1–1	Turkey
28 November 2014
England	1–4	Spain
Czech Republic	7–1	Turkey

=== Group F ===
Team	Pld	W	D	L	GF	GA	GD	Pts
Russia	3	2	1	0	10	2	+8	7
Germany	3	2	1	0	8	2	+6	7
Latvia	3	1	0	2	7	6	+1	3
Cyprus	3	0	0	3	2	17	−15	0

27 November 2014
Russia	6–0	Cyprus
Germany	5–1	Cyprus
Russia	3–1	Latvia
28 November 2014
Latvia	0–2	Germany
Cyprus	1–6	Latvia
Germany	1–1	Russia

=== Ranking of third-placed teams ===
Grp	Team	Pld	W	D	L	GF	GA	GD	Pts
C	Slovenia	3	1	1	1	6	4	+2	4
F	Latvia	3	1	0	2	7	6	+1	3
D	Scotland	3	1	0	2	7	10	−3	3
E	England	3	1	0	2	4	8	−4	3
B	Bulgaria	3	0	2	1	5	6	−1	2
A	Italy	3	0	2	1	4	5	−1	2

== Knockout stage ==
The round of 16 and the quarter-finals were played on 29 November 2014 and the semi-finals, third place play-off and the final, were played on 30 November 2014. If a match was drawn after 40 minutes of regular play, a penalty shoot-out is used to determine the winner.

=== Bracket ===
Round of 16
Croatia	8
Latvia	1
Slovakia	1
Czech Republic	5
Russia	3 (3)
Scotland	3 (4)
Romania	2
Moldova	0
Montenegro	2
England	1
Greece	0
Germany	4
Poland	0
Kazakhstan	2
Spain	1
Slovenia	4

Quarter-finals
Croatia	3 (0)
Czech Republic	3 (2)
Scotland	2
Romania	3
Montenegro	2 (1)
Germany	2 (2)
Kazakhstan	0 (0)
Slovenia	0 (2)

Semi-finals
Czech Republic	1
Romania	2
Germany	3
Slovenia	6

Final
Romania	1
Slovenia	0
Third place
Czech Republic	2
Germany	1
