= Romania national minifootball team =

Sports team representing Romania

Romania
- Association: Romanian Minifootball Federation
- Confederation: EMF (Europe)
- Head coach: Virgil-Constantin Bejenaru
- Captain: Popa Ioan Mircea
- Top scorer: Radu Burcia (19)

First international
- Romania 3–1 Czech Republic (Bratislava, Slovakia; 2010)

Biggest win
- Romania 21- 0 India (Illinois, United States; 21 March 2015)

Biggest defeat
- Mexico 7–3 Romania (Illinois, United States; 22 March 2015); United States 7–3 Romania (Illinois, United States; 28 March 2015)

WMF World Cup
- Appearances: 5 (first in 2015)
- Best result: Champions (2023)

EMF EURO
- Appearances: 12 (first in 2010)
- Best result: Champions (2010, 2011, 2012, 2013, 2014, 2015)

WMF Continental Cup
- Appearances: 1 (first in 2019)
- Best result: Third place (2019)

The Romania national minifootball team represents Romania in men's international minifootball competitions and it is controlled by the Romanian Minifootball Federation, which governs minifootball in Romania. The team is one of the most successful in the world, having won the WMF World Cup in 2023, the EMF EURO six times in 2010, 2011, 2012, 2013, 2014 and 2015 while they ranked second in 2018, 2022 and 2024 and got third place at the 2019 WMF Continental Cup.

== Competitive records ==
Champions Runners-up Third place Fourth place

- Red border color indicates tournament was held on home soil.

=== WMF World Cup ===
WMF World Cup
Year	Round	Position	Pld	W	D*	L	GF	GA
(United States) 2015	Third place	3rd	4	3	0	1	39	16
(Tunisia) 2017	Round of 16	11th	4	3	1	0	15	3
(Australia) 2019	Third place	3rd	7	6	0	1	32	4
(United Arab Emirates) 2023	Champions	1st	7	5	2	0	27	5
(Azerbaijan) 2025	Round of 16		4	1	2	1	5	6
Total	1 Title	5/5	26	18	5	3	118	34

=== WMF Continental Cup ===
WMF Continental Cup
Year	Round	Position	Pld	W	D*	L	GF	GA
(Tunisia) 2019	Third place	3rd	4	3	1	0	26	8
Total	Third place	1/1	4	3	1	0	26	8

=== EMF EURO ===
EMF EURO
Year	Round	Position	Pld	W	D*	L	GF	GA
(Slovakia) 2010	Champions	1st	2	2	0	0	11	1
(Romania) 2011	Champions	1st	5	4	1	0	18	6
(Moldova) 2012	Champions	1st	6	5	1	0	16	6
(Greece) 2013	Champions	1st	7	5	1	1	7	1
(Montenegro) 2014	Champions	1st	7	7	0	0	19	4
(Croatia) 2015	Champions	1st	7	6	1	0	18	3
(Hungary) 2016	Round of 16	10th	4	2	1	1	8	6
(Czech Republic) 2017	Fourth place	4th	7	4	2	1	15	8
(Ukraine) 2018	Runners-up	2nd	7	6	0	1	14	8
(Slovakia) 2022	Runners-up	2nd	7	4	2	1	17	3
(Bosnia and Herzegovina) 2024	Runners-up	2nd	7	4	3	0	23	5
(Slovakia) 2026	TBD	TBD						
Total	6 Titles	12/12	66	49	12	5	166	51

== Honours and awards ==
=== Honours ===
- WMF World Cup

(gold) Champions: 2023
(bronze) Third place: 2015, 2019

- WMF Continental Cup

(bronze) Third place: 2019

- EMF EURO

(gold) Champions: 2010, 2011, 2012, 2013, 2014, 2015
(silver) Runners-up: 2018, 2022, 2024

=== Awards ===
- WMF World Cup Best player

Dragos Nitu (2023)

- WMF World Cup Top scorer

Marius Gabriel Balogh (2023)

- EMF EURO Best player

Adrian Calugareanu (2012)

- EMF EURO Top scorer

Claudiu Dumitru (2010)
Razvan Dumitru Radu (2011)
Robert Dragan Paulevici (2018)
