= 2012 EMF miniEURO =

Tournament details
- Host country: Moldova
- Dates: 21–23 September
- Teams: 16
- Venue(s): 1 (in 1 host city)

Final positions
- Champions: Romania (3rd title)
- Runners-up: Montenegro
- Third place: Czech Republic
- Fourth place: Slovakia

Tournament statistics
- Matches played: 32
- Goals scored: 131 (4.09 per match)
- Best player(s): (Romania) Adrian Calugareanu

The 2012 EMF miniEuro was the third edition of the EMF miniEURO for national Small-sided football teams, and the first governed by the European Minifootball Federation. It was hosted in Chișinău, Moldova, from 21 to 23 September 2012.

The final tournament was contested by sixteen teams. The matches were played in one venue in the city of Chișinău, at the Opera Square.

The defending champions, Romania, kept their title by overcoming Montenegro 2–1 in the final.

== Draw ==
The final tournament draw was held in Chișinău on 14 September 2012.

== Group stage ==
In the group stage, a total of 24 matches (three matches per group) were played between 21 and 22 October, with rainy conditions causing some of the matches to be postponed for the 21st to the 22nd. The teams finishing in the top two positions in each of the four groups progressed to the knockout stage, while the third and fourth-placed teams was eliminated from the tournament.

Key to colours in group tables
Team advanced to the knockout stage

=== Group A ===
| Team | Pld | W | D | L | GF | GA | GD | Pts |
|---|---|---|---|---|---|---|---|---|
| Slovakia | 3 | 2 | 1 | 0 | 11 | 4 | +7 | 7 |
| Moldova | 3 | 2 | 1 | 0 | 4 | 0 | +4 | 7 |
| Germany | 3 | 1 | 0 | 2 | 7 | 8 | −1 | 3 |
| Slovenia | 3 | 0 | 0 | 3 | 2 | 12 | −10 | 0 |

21 September 2012
| Germany | 3–2 | Slovenia |
| Slovakia | 0–0 | Moldova |
22 September 2012
| Germany | 0–1 | Moldova |
| Slovakia | 6–0 | Slovenia |
| Moldova | 3–0 | Slovenia |
| Slovakia | 5–4 | Germany |

=== Group B ===
| Team | Pld | W | D | L | GF | GA | GD | Pts |
|---|---|---|---|---|---|---|---|---|
| Romania | 3 | 2 | 1 | 0 | 10 | 3 | +7 | 7 |
| Croatia | 3 | 2 | 1 | 0 | 10 | 4 | +6 | 7 |
| Israel | 3 | 1 | 0 | 2 | 6 | 8 | −2 | 3 |
| Cyprus | 3 | 0 | 0 | 3 | 2 | 13 | −11 | 0 |

21 September 2012
| Israel | 2–3 | Croatia |
| Romania | 5–0 | Cyprus |
22 September 2012
| Israel | 1–3 | Romania |
| Croatia | 5–0 | Cyprus |
| Croatia | 2–2 | Romania |
| Cyprus | 2–3 | Israel |

=== Group C ===
| Team | Pld | W | D | L | GF | GA | GD | Pts |
|---|---|---|---|---|---|---|---|---|
| Montenegro | 3 | 3 | 0 | 0 | 12 | 4 | +8 | 9 |
| Czech Republic | 3 | 2 | 0 | 1 | 7 | 2 | +5 | 6 |
| United Kingdom | 3 | 1 | 0 | 2 | 5 | 13 | −8 | 3 |
| Italy | 3 | 0 | 0 | 3 | 5 | 10 | −5 | 0 |

21 September 2012
| Czech Republic | 4–1 | United Kingdom |
| Montenegro | 4–3 | Italy |
22 September 2012
| Czech Republic | 3–0 | Italy |
| United Kingdom | 1–7 | Montenegro |
| Czech Republic | 0–1 | Montenegro |
| United Kingdom | 3–2 | Italy |

=== Group D ===
| Team | Pld | W | D | L | GF | GA | GD | Pts |
|---|---|---|---|---|---|---|---|---|
| Bulgaria | 3 | 1 | 2 | 0 | 7 | 4 | +3 | 5 |
| Kazakhstan | 3 | 1 | 2 | 0 | 5 | 3 | +2 | 5 |
| Turkey | 3 | 1 | 1 | 1 | 5 | 6 | −1 | 4 |
| Greece | 3 | 0 | 1 | 2 | 6 | 10 | −4 | 1 |

21 September 2012
| Turkey | 0–0 | Kazakhstan |
| Greece | 2–2 | Bulgaria |
22 September 2012
| Bulgaria | 3–0 | Turkey |
| Greece | 1–3 | Kazakhstan |
| Turkey | 5–3 | Greece |
| Kazakhstan | 2–2 | Bulgaria |

== Knockout stage ==
The knockout stage matches, which includes quarter-finals, semi-finals, third place play-off and the final, were all played on 23 September 2012. If a match is drawn after 40 minutes of regular play, a penalty shoot-out is used to determine the winner.

=== Bracket ===
Quarter-finals
Bulgaria | 1
Czech Republic | 3
Romania | 2
Moldova | 1
Montenegro | 2
Kazakhstan | 1
Slovakia | 1 (3)
Croatia | 1 (2)

Semi-finals
Czech Republic | 1
Romania | 2
Montenegro | 2
Slovakia | 1

Final
Romania | 2
Montenegro | 1
Third place
8 February
Czech Republic | 3 (4)
Slovakia | 3 (3)
