= WMF World Cup =

- Organiser(s): WMF
- Founded: 2015; 11 years ago
- Region: International
- Teams: 32
- Current champions: Azerbaijan (1st title)
- Most championships: Czech Republic; Mexico; Romania; United States; Azerbaijan (1 title each)
- Website: Official website
- 2025 WMF World Cup

The WMF World Cup is an international minifootball competition among the senior men's national teams of the members of the World Minifootball Federation (WMF), the sport's global governing body. The tournament is played as six-a-side 50-minute format.

== History ==
The competition has been held every two years since the inaugural edition was played in the United States in 2015. The second edition was held in Tunisia in 2017, making it the first edition to be played in Africa. The third edition was held in Australia in 2019, making it the first edition to be played in Oceania. The tournament was not played in 2021 due to the COVID-19 pandemic. The fourth edition was held in the United Arab Emirates in 2023, making it the first edition to be played in Asia. The fifth and most recent edition was held in Azerbaijan in 2025, making it the first edition to be played in Europe. The sixth edition will be held in Brno, Czech Republic, from 2 to 11 June 2027, with the T-Arena as its venue. It will be the first edition hosted by the Czech Republic.

The United States won the inaugural edition title on home soil in 2015. The Czech Republic won the second edition title in 2017. Mexico won the third edition title in 2019. Romania won the fourth edition title in 2023. Azerbaijan won the title of the fifth and most recent edition title in 2025. The current champion are Azerbaijan, who won title of the fifth and most recent edition title in 2025.

Individual awards are given out at the end of each tournament.

== Results ==
=== Editions ===
#	Year	Host	First place game			Third place game			Teams
#	Year	Host	(gold) Champion	Score	(silver) Runner-up	(bronze) Third place	Score	Fourth place	Teams
1	2015	United States	United States	5–3	Mexico	Brazil and Romania			12
2	2017	Tunisia	Czech Republic	3–0	Mexico	Senegal	5–0	Spain	24
3	2019	Australia	Mexico	4–0	Brazil	Romania	0–0 (3–1 p)	Hungary	32
—	2021	Cancelled due to COVID-19 pandemic							—
4	2023	United Arab Emirates	Romania	2–2 (12–11 p)	Kazakhstan	Hungary	3–1	Azerbaijan	32
5	2025	Azerbaijan	Azerbaijan	4–2	Hungary	Serbia	3–0	Montenegro	32
6	2027	Czech Republic	To be determined						TBD

=== Summary ===
Team	Champion	Runner-up	Third place	Fourth place
Mexico	1 (2019)	2 (2015, 2017)	—	—
Romania	1 (2023)	—	2 (2015, 2019)	—
Azerbaijan	1 (2025)	—	—	1 (2023)
Czech Republic	1 (2017)	—	—	—
United States	1 (2015)	—	—	—
Hungary	—	1 (2025)	1 (2023)	1 (2019)
Brazil	—	1 (2019)	1 (2015)	—
Kazakhstan	—	1 (2023)	—	—
Senegal	—	—	1 (2017)	—
Serbia	—	—	1 (2025)	—
Spain	—	—	—	1 (2017)
Montenegro	—	—	—	1 (2025)

=== Medal table ===
Rank	Nation	Gold	Silver	Bronze	Total
1	Mexico	1	2	0	3
2	Romania	1	0	2	3
3	Azerbaijan	1	0	0	1
3	Czech Republic	1	0	0	1
3	United States	1	0	0	1
6	Brazil	0	1	1	2
6	Hungary	0	1	1	2
8	Kazakhstan	0	1	0	1
9	Senegal	0	0	1	1
9	Serbia	0	0	1	1
Totals (10 entries)		5	5	6	16

== Awards ==
Individual awards are given out at the end of each tournament.

Year	Best Player	Top Scorer	Best goalkeeper
2015	(United States) Danny Waltman	(United States) Kraig Chiles (10)	—N/a
2017	(Tunisia) Ouday Belhaj	(Spain) Francisco Castaño (10)	(Senegal) Papa Samba Diallo
2019	(Mexico) Moises Gonzalez	(Czech Republic) Ondřej Paděra (10)	(Mexico) Bernardo Valdovinos Solos
2023	(Romania) Dragos Nitu	(Romania) Marius Gabriel Balogh (6)	(Kazakhstan) Alexandr Rushinas
2025	(Azerbaijan) Ramiz Chovdarov	(Czech Republic) Ondřej Paděra (Portugal) Tiago Lapa (7)	(Serbia) Vladimir Bajić

== Participating nations ==
Teams	(United States) 2015 (12)	(Tunisia) 2017 (24)	(Australia) 2019 (32)	(United Arab Emirates) 2023 (32)	(Azerbaijan) 2025 (32)	Years
Afghanistan	×	×	GS	×	×	1
Albania	×	×	×	GS	×	1
Algeria	×	×	×	GS	×	1
Argentina	×	GS	GS	×	GS	3
Australia	×	QF	QF	×	×	2
Azerbaijan	×	×	×	4th	1st	2
Bahrain	×	×	×	×	GS	1
Bosnia and Herzegovina	×	R16	×	×	QF	2
Brazil	3rd	R16	2nd	×	×	3
Bulgaria	×	×	×	QF	R16	2
Canada	QF	×	×	×	×	1
Chad	×	×	×	×	GS	1
Chile	×	R16	GS	×	×	2
Colombia	×	×	R16	×	×	1
Costa Rica	×	×	GS	×	GS	2
Czech Republic	QF	1st	QF	QF	QF	5
Egypt	×	×	×	R16	×	1
El Salvador	QF	×	×	×	×	1
England	×	×	GS	R16	QF	3
France	×	QF	×	GS	R16	3
Germany	QF	×	×	×	×	1
Georgia	×	×	×	R16	R16	2
Ghana	×	×	R16	GS	GS	3
Guatemala	×	GS	R16	GS	×	3
Hungary	×	QF	4th	3rd	2nd	4
India	GS	GS	GS	GS	GS	5
Indonesia	×	×	×	×	GS	1
Iraq	×	GS	GS	GS	×	3
Ireland	×	×	×	GS	×	1
Ivory Coast	×	GS	×	×	×	1
Israel	×	×	×	×	R16	1
Japan	×	×	GS	GS	×	2
Kazakhstan	GS	R16	×	2nd	GS	4
Lebanon	×	GS	GS	GS	×	3
Libya	×	R16	×	GS	×	2
Mauritania	×	×	×	×	QF	1
Mexico	2nd	2nd	1st	R16	×	4
Moldova	×	×	R16	×	×	1
Montenegro	×	×	×	R16	4th	2
Nigeria	×	×	GS	×	×	1
Oman	×	×	×	GS	×	1
Poland	×	×	×	×	R16	1
Portugal	×	GS	GS	R16	R16	4
Romania	3rd	R16	3rd	1st	R16	5
Russia	GS	R16	×	×	×	2
Saudi Arabia	×	×	R16	×	×	1
Senegal	×	3rd	×	×	×	1
Serbia	GS	×	R16	GS	3rd	4
Singapore	×	×	GS	×	×	1
Slovenia	×	×	×	×	GS	1
Slovakia	×	×	QF	QF	GS	3
Somalia	×	GS	GS	×	×	2
South Africa	×	×	GS	×	×	1
Spain	×	4th	×	GS	GS	3
Sudan	×	×	×	GS	×	1
Switzerland	×	×	GS	×	×	1
Thailand	×	×	GS	R16	R16	3
Tunisia	×	QF	R16	×	×	2
Turkey	×	×	×	×	GS	1
Ukraine	×	×	QF	GS	GS	3
United Arab Emirates	×	×	×	QF	GS	2
United States	1st	R16	R16	R16	GS	5
Uzbekistan	×	×	×	×	GS	1
Total: 63 team	12	24	32	32	32	–

Legends

- 1st – Champions
- 2nd – Runners-up
- 3rd – Third place
- 4th – Fourth place
- QF – Quarter Finals
- R16 – Round of 16
- GS – Group stage
- Q – Qualified
- × – Did not enter
- – Hosts

== See also ==
- WMF Women’s World Cup
