= EMF EURO =

- Organiser(s): EMF
- Founded: 2010
- Region: Europe
- Teams: 24 (EMF EURO 2026)
- Current champions: Azerbaijan (2 titles)
- Most championships: Romania (6 titles)
- EMF EURO 2026

The EMF EURO is a continental minifootball competition contested by the senior men's national teams of European Minifootball Federation (EMF).

== Results ==
=== Editions ===
Ed.	Year	Host	First place game			Third place game			Teams
Ed.	Year	Host	(gold) Champion	Score	(silver) Runnerup	(bronze) Third place	Score	Fourth place	Teams
1	2010	Slovakia	Romania	8–0	Slovakia	Czech Republic	5–1	Greece	4
2	2011	Romania	Romania	3–3 (5–4 p)	Czech Republic	Moldova	1–0	Greece	7
3	2012	Moldova	Romania	2–1	Montenegro	Czech Republic	3–3 (4–3 p)	Slovakia	16
4	2013	Greece	Romania	2–0	Croatia	Germany	1–1 (2–1 p)	Russia	24
5	2014	Montenegro	Romania	1–0	Slovenia	Czech Republic	2–1	Germany	24
6	2015	Croatia	Romania	5–1	Croatia	Bosnia and Herzegovina	4–3	Czech Republic	32
7	2016	Hungary	Kazakhstan	2–2 (6–5 p)	Croatia	Czech Republic	2–0	Montenegro	32
8	2017	Czech Republic	Russia	1–1 (3–2 p)	Czech Republic	Hungary	0–0 (3–2 p)	Romania	24
9	2018	Ukraine	Czech Republic	4–1	Romania	Kazakhstan	2–0	England	20
10	2022	Slovakia	Azerbaijan	1–0	Romania	Bulgaria	4–1	Kazakhstan	24
11	2024	Bosnia and Herzegovina	Serbia	1–1 (10–9 p)	Romania	Kazakhstan	7–2	France	24
12	2026	Slovakia	Azerbaijan	2–0	Ukraine	Serbia Hungary	no third place game, both defeated teams in the semifinals received a bronze medal		24

=== Medal table ===
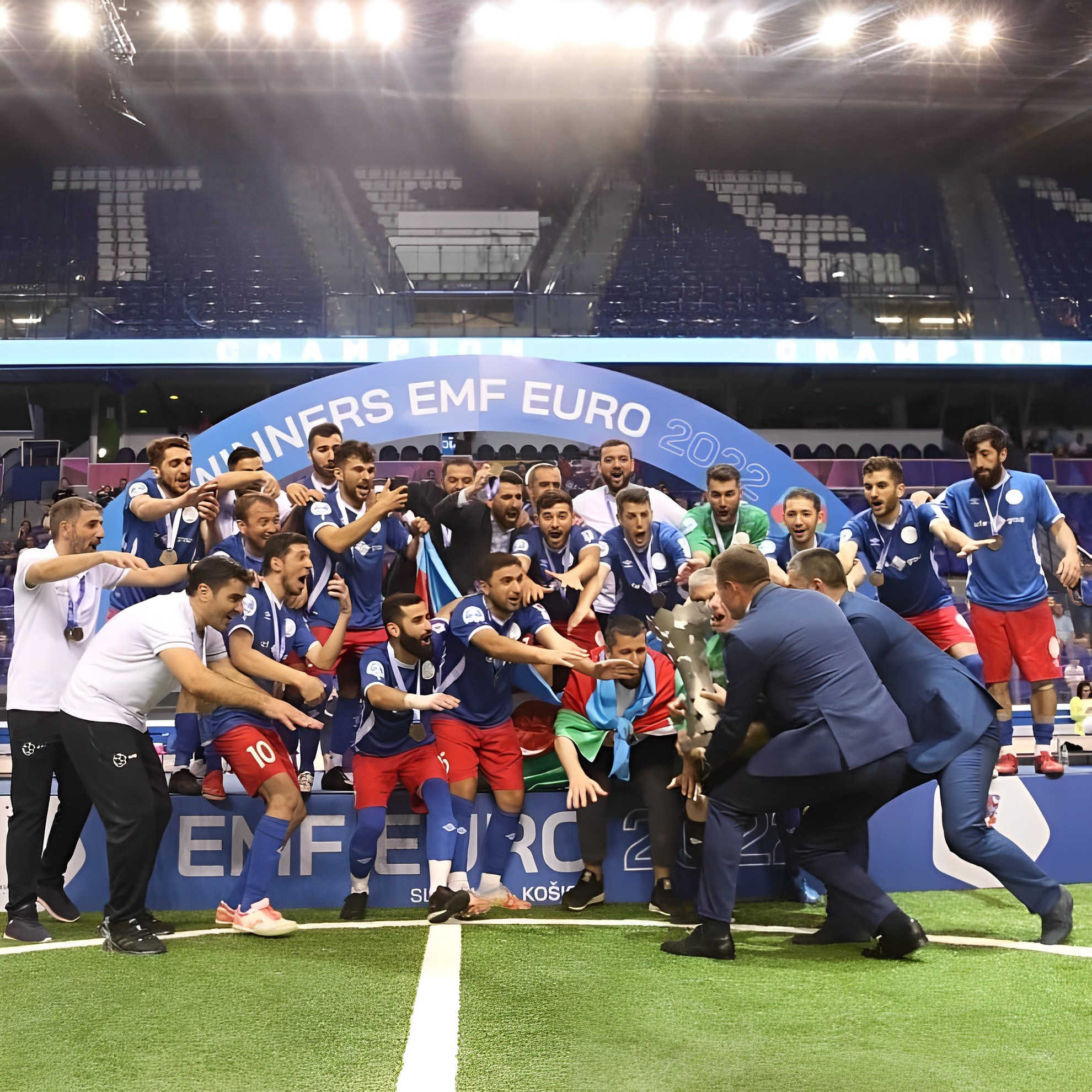
Azerbaijan champions of the 2022 edition.

Rank	Nation	Gold	Silver	Bronze	Total
1	Romania	6	3	0	9
2	Azerbaijan	2	0	0	2
3	Czech Republic	1	2	4	7
4	Kazakhstan	1	0	2	3
5	Serbia	1	0	1	2
6	Russia	1	0	0	1
7	Croatia	0	3	0	3
8	Montenegro	0	1	0	1
8	Slovakia	0	1	0	1
8	Slovenia	0	1	0	1
8	Ukraine	0	1	0	1
12	Hungary	0	0	2	2
13	Bosnia and Herzegovina	0	0	1	1
13	Bulgaria	0	0	1	1
13	Germany	0	0	1	1
13	Moldova	0	0	1	1
Totals (16 entries)		12	12	13	37

== Participating nations ==
Teams	(Slovakia) 2010 (4)	(Romania) 2011 (7)	(Moldova) 2012 (16)	(Greece) 2013 (24)	(Montenegro) 2014 (24)	(Croatia) 2015 (32)	(Hungary) 2016 (32)	(Czech Republic) 2017 (24)	(Ukraine) 2018 (20)	(Slovakia) 2022 (24)	(Bosnia and Herzegovina) 2024 (24)	(Slovakia) 2026 (24)	Years
Albania	×	×	×	×	×	×	×	×	GS	GS	GS	×	3
Austria	×	×	×	R16	×	R16	GS	×	GS	GS	×		5
Azerbaijan	×	×	×	×	×	×	×	×	GS	1st	QF	1st	4
Belgium	×	×	×	×	×	GS	×	GS	GS	GS	QF		5
Bosnia and Herzegovina	×	×	×	×	×	3rd	QF	QF	QF	×	QF		5
Bulgaria	×	GS	QF	R16	GS	GS	GS	R16	GS	3rd	R16		10
Croatia	×	×	QF	2nd	QF	2nd	2nd	R16	×	×	GS	×	7
Cyprus	×	GS	GS	GS	GS	GS	GS	×	×	×	×	×	6
Czech Republic	3rd	2nd	3rd	QF	3rd	4th	3rd	2nd	1st	QF	R16		11
England	×	×	×	QF	R16	R16	QF	×	4th	R16	GS		7
Estonia	×	×	×	×	×	×	GS	×	×	×	×	×	1
France	×	×	×	×	×	GS	GS	QF	×	QF	4th		5
Georgia	×	×	×	×	×	×	×	×	×	R16	R16		2
Germany	×	×	GS	3rd	4th	R16	QF	GS	×	×	×	×	6
Greece	4th	4th	GS	R16	R16	GS	GS	R16	×	GS	GS		10
Hungary	×	×	×	×	×	QF	R16	3rd	GS	QF	R16		6
Ireland	×	×	×	GS	GS	GS	×	×	GS	×	×	×	4
Israel	×	×	GS	R16	GS	R16	GS	GS	GS	R16	×		8
Italy	×	×	GS	GS	GS	GS	GS	GS	GS	R16	GS		9
Kazakhstan	×	×	QF	R16	QF	GS	1st	R16	3rd	4th	3rd		9
Latvia	×	×	×	×	R16	GS	GS	GS	×	×	×	×	4
Luxembourg	×	×	×	×	×	GS	GS	×	×	×	×	×	2
Lithuania	×	×	×	GS	GS	GS	GS	×	×	×	×	×	4
Moldova	×	3rd	QF	R16	R16	GS	R16	×	×	GS	×	×	7
Montenegro	×	×	2nd	QF	QF	R16	4th	R16	QF	R16	QF		9
Portugal	×	×	×	×	×	GS	GS	GS	×	R16	GS		5
Poland	×	×	×	QF	R16	QF	R16	QF	×	GS	R16		7
Romania	1st	1st	1st	1st	1st	1st	R16	4th	2nd	2nd	2nd		11
Russia	×	×	×	4th	R16	QF	R16	1st	×	×	×	×	5
Scotland	×	×	×	GS	QF	R16	GS	×	×	×	×	×	4
Serbia	×	×	×	×	×	GS	GS	R16	QF	R16	1st		6
Slovakia	2nd	GS	4th	R16	R16	R16	R16	R16	GS	QF	R16		11
Slovenia	×	×	GS	GS	2nd	QF	R16	QF	×	×	R16		7
Spain	×	×	×	GS	R16	R16	R16	GS	GS	GS	GS		8
Turkey	×	×	GS	R16	GS	GS	GS	R16	GS	GS	GS		9
Ukraine	×	×	×	×	×	×	GS	GS	QF	R16	R16	2nd	6
Great Britain	×	×	GS	×	×	×	×	×	×	×	×	×	1
Wales	×	×	×	GS	GS	GS	QF	×	×	×	×	×	4
Total: 38 team	4	7	16	24	24	32	32	24	20	24	24	24	

Legends

- 1st – Champions
- 2nd – Runners-up
- 3rd – Third place
- 4th – Fourth place
- QF – Quarter Finals
- R16 – Round of 16
- GS – Group stage
- Q – Qualified
- × – Did not enter
- – Hosts
