= Czech Republic national minifootball team =

Czech Republic
- Association: Minifootball Association of the Czech Republic
- Confederation: EMF (Europe)
- Head coach: Stanislav Bejda
- Top scorer: Ondrej Padera (52)

First international
- Romania 3–1 Czech Republic (Bratislava, Slovakia; 2010)

Biggest win
- Czech Republic 17–0 Singapore (Perth, Australia; 2 October 2019)

Biggest defeat
- Brazil 7–3 Czech Republic (Michigan, United States; 26 March 2015)

WMF World Cup
- Appearances: 5 (first in 2015)
- Best result: Champions (2017)

EMF EURO
- Appearances: 11 (first in 2010)
- Best result: Champions (2018)

WMF Continental Cup
- Appearances: 1 (first in 2019)
- Best result: Champions (2019)

The Czech Republic national minifootball team represents Czech Republic in men's international minifootball competitions and it is controlled by the Minifootball Association of the Czech Republic, which governs minifootball in Czech Republic. The team is one of the most successful in the world, having won the 2017 WMF World Cup, the 2019 WMF Continental Cup and the 2018 EMF EURO.

== Competitive records ==
Champions Runners-up Third place Fourth place

- Red border color indicates tournament was held on home soil.

=== WMF World Cup ===
WMF World Cup
Year	Round	Position	Pld	W	D*	L	GF	GA
(United States) 2015	Quarter-finals		4	1	1	2	19	24
(Tunisia) 2017	Champions	1st	7	7	0	0	32	3
(Australia) 2019	Quarter-finals	5th	5	4	0	1	34	8
(United Arab Emirates) 2023	Quarter-finals		5	4	1	0	28	9
(Azerbaijan) 2025	Quarter-finals		5	3	1	1	17	7
Total	1 Title	5/5	26	19	3	4	130	51

=== WMF Continental Cup ===
WMF Continental Cup
Year	Round	Position	Pld	W	D*	L	GF	GA
(Tunisia) 2019	Champions	1st	4	3	1	0	33	17
Total	1 Title	1/1	4	3	1	0	33	17

=== EMF EURO ===
EMF EURO
Year	Round	Position	Pld	W	D*	L	GF	GA
(Slovakia) 2010	Third place	3rd	2	1	0	1	6	4
(Romania) 2011	Runners-up	2nd	4	2	2	0	10	8
(Moldova) 2012	Third place	3rd	6	3	1	2	14	8
(Greece) 2013	Quarter-finals	5th	5	2	2	1	10	5
(Montenegro) 2014	Third place	3rd	7	4	1	2	20	11
(Croatia) 2015	Fourth place	4th	7	4	2	1	18	11
(Hungary) 2016	Third place	3rd	7	6	0	1	22	8
(Czech Republic) 2017	Runners-up	2nd	7	5	1	1	23	5
(Ukraine) 2018	Champions	1st	7	5	2	0	24	9
(Slovakia) 2022	Quarter-finals	7th	5	2	2	1	7	6
(Bosnia and Herzegovina) 2024	Round of 16		4	2	1	1	11	10
Total	1 Title	11/11	61	36	14	11	165	85

== Honours and awards ==
=== Honours ===
- WMF World Cup

(gold) Champions: 2017

- WMF Continental Cup

(gold) Champions: 2019

- EMF EURO

(gold) Champions: 2018
(silver) Runners-up: 2011, 2017
(bronze) Third place: 2010, 2012, 2014, 2016

=== Awards ===
- WMF World Cup Top scorer

Ondřej Paděra (2019)

- EMF EURO Best player

Francis Caraffa (2011)
Patrik Levcik (2017)

- EMF EURO Best goalkeeper

Ondrej Biro (2018)

- EMF EURO Top scorer

Patrik Levcik, Michal Salak (2017)
Ondrej Padera (2018)
