= 2013 EMF miniEURO =

Tournament details
- Host country: Greece
- Dates: 10–13 October
- Teams: 24
- Venue: 1 (in 1 host city)

Final positions
- Champions: Romania (4th title)
- Runners-up: Croatia
- Third place: Germany
- Fourth place: Russia

The 2013 EMF miniEuro was the fourth edition of the EMF miniEURO for national Small-sided football teams. It was hosted in Rethymno, Greece, from 10 to 13 October 2013.

The final tournament was contested by 24 teams. The matches were played in one venue in the city of Rethymno, at an especially built stadium.

The defending champions, Romania, kept their title by overcoming Croatia 2–0 in the final.

== Group stage ==
In the group stage, the 24 teams were divided into 6 groups of 4 teams, with each team playing 3 matches. the teams finishing in the top two positions in each of the six groups progressed to the knockout stage, along with the best four third-placed teams.

Key to colours in group tables
Team advanced to the knockout stage

=== Group A ===
Team	Pld	W	D	L	GF	GA	GD	Pts
Turkey	3	2	1	0	8	1	+7	7
Greece	3	2	1	0	6	3	+3	7
Italy	3	0	1	2	3	5	−2	1
Lithuania	3	0	1	2	1	9	−8	1

11 October 2013
Greece	1–1	Turkey
Italy	1–1	Lithuania
12 October 2013
Turkey	1–0	Italy
Greece	2–0	Lithuania
Turkey	6–0	Lithuania
Greece	3–2	Italy

=== Group B ===
Team	Pld	W	D	L	GF	GA	GD	Pts
Israel	3	2	1	0	5	1	+4	7
Montenegro	3	2	0	1	6	4	+2	6
Moldova	3	1	1	1	4	4	0	4
Ireland	3	0	0	3	2	8	−6	0

11 October 2013
Moldova	3–2	Ireland
Israel	3–1	Montenegro
Montenegro	3–0	Ireland
Moldova	0–0	Israel
12 October 2013
Montenegro	2–1	Moldova
Israel	2–0	Ireland

=== Group C ===
Team	Pld	W	D	L	GF	GA	GD	Pts
Russia	3	2	1	0	4	0	+4	7
Germany	3	2	0	1	6	3	+3	6
Czech Republic	3	1	1	1	6	3	+3	4
Cyprus	3	0	0	3	0	10	−10	0

10 October 2013
Czech Republic	4–0	Cyprus
Russia	1–0	Germany
11 October 2013
Czech Republic	0–0	Russia
Germany	3–0	Cyprus
Germany	3–2	Czech Republic
Russia	3–0	Cyprus

=== Group D ===
Team	Pld	W	D	L	GF	GA	GD	Pts
Kazakhstan	3	1	2	0	7	5	+2	5
Austria	3	1	2	0	2	1	+1	5
Slovakia	3	1	1	1	4	4	0	4
Scotland	3	0	1	2	1	4	−3	1

11 October 2013
Slovakia	1–0	Scotland
Kazakhstan	1–1	Austria
Austria	1–0	Slovakia
Kazakhstan	3–1	Scotland
12 October 2013
Scotland	0–0	Austria
Slovakia	3–3	Kazakhstan

=== Group E ===
Team	Pld	W	D	L	GF	GA	GD	Pts
Bulgaria	3	2	1	0	8	2	+6	7
England	3	1	2	0	5	1	+4	5
Spain	3	1	1	1	4	5	−1	4
Wales	3	0	0	3	1	10	−9	0

11 October 2013
Bulgaria	4–1	Wales
Spain	1–1	England
England	4–0	Wales
Bulgaria	4–1	Spain
12 October 2013
Spain	2–0	Wales
England	0–0	Bulgaria

=== Group F ===
Team	Pld	W	D	L	GF	GA	GD	Pts
Romania	3	2	0	1	2	1	+1	6
Croatia	3	1	2	0	3	2	+1	5
Poland	3	1	1	1	5	3	+2	4
Slovenia	3	0	1	2	2	6	−4	1

11 October 2013
Romania	1–0	Slovenia
Poland	1–1	Croatia
Slovenia	1–1	Croatia
Romania	1–0	Poland
12 October 2013
Poland	4–1	Slovenia
Croatia	1–0	Romania

=== Ranking of third-placed teams ===
Grp	Team	Pld	W	D	L	GF	GA	GD	Pts
C	Czech Republic	3	1	1	1	6	3	+3	4
F	Poland	3	1	1	1	5	3	+2	4
D	Slovakia	3	1	1	1	4	4	0	4
B	Moldova	3	1	1	1	4	4	0	4
E	Spain	3	1	1	1	4	5	−1	4
A	Italy	3	0	1	2	3	5	−2	1

== Knockout stage ==
The knockout stage matches were played on 12–13 October 2013. If a match is drawn after 40 minutes of regular play, a penalty shoot-out is used to determine the winner.

=== Bracket ===
Round of 16
Romania	1
Slovakia	0
Austria	0
England	3
Israel	1
Czech Republic	3
Germany	1 (6)
Greece	1 (5)
Russia	3
Moldova	1
Bulgaria	0
Montenegro	2
Poland	2
Kazakhstan	1
Turkey	0
Croatia	3

Quarter-finals
Romania	2
England	0
Czech Republic	1 (3)
Germany	1 (4)
Russia	2
Montenegro	1
Poland	0
Croatia	2

Semi-finals
Romania	0 (2)
Germany	0 (1)
Russia	1 (3)
Croatia	1 (4)

Final
Romania	2
Croatia	0
Third place
Germany	1 (2)
Russia	1 (1)
