= 2011 EMF miniEURO =

2011 Minifootball European Championships
Tournament details
- Host country: Romania
- Dates: 5–6 November
- Teams: 7
- Venue: 1 (in 1 host city)

Final positions
- Champions: Romania (2nd title)
- Runners-up: Czech Republic
- Third place: Moldova
- Fourth place: Greece

The 2011 European minifootball Championships was the second edition of the unofficial European minifootball championships, a forerunner of the EMF miniEURO, a competition for national Small-sided football teams. It was hosted in Tulcea, Romania, from 5 to 6 November 2011.

The defending champions, Romania, kept their title by overcoming Czech Republic 5–4 on penalties after 3–3 in the final.

== Group stage ==
Key to colours in group tables
Team advanced to the knockout stage

=== Group A ===
Team	Pld	W	D	L	GF	GA	GD	Pts
Romania	3	3	0	0	11	2	+9	9
Greece	3	1	1	1	5	6	−1	4
Bulgaria	3	0	2	1	3	8	−5	2
Slovakia	3	0	1	2	5	8	−3	1

5 November 2011
Romania	5–0	Bulgaria
Greece	3–2	Slovakia
Romania	3–1	Slovakia
Bulgaria	1–1	Greece
Greece	1–3	Romania
Slovakia	2–2	Bulgaria

=== Group B ===
Team	Pld	W	D	L	GF	GA	GD	Pts
Czech Republic	2	2	0	0	6	4	+2	6
Moldova	2	1	0	1	7	4	+3	3
Cyprus	2	0	0	2	3	8	−5	0

5 November 2011
Moldova	2–3	Czech Republic
Czech Republic	3–2	Cyprus
Cyprus	1–5	Moldova

== Knockout stage ==
The knockout stage matches were played on 6 November 2011. If a match is drawn after 40 minutes of regular play, a penalty shoot-out is used to determine the winner.

=== Bracket ===
Semi-finals
Romania	4
Moldova	1
Czech Republic	1 (2)
Greece	1 (0)

Final
Romania	3 (5)
Czech Republic	3 (4)
Third place
Moldova	1
Greece	0
