= United States men's national minifootball team =

United States
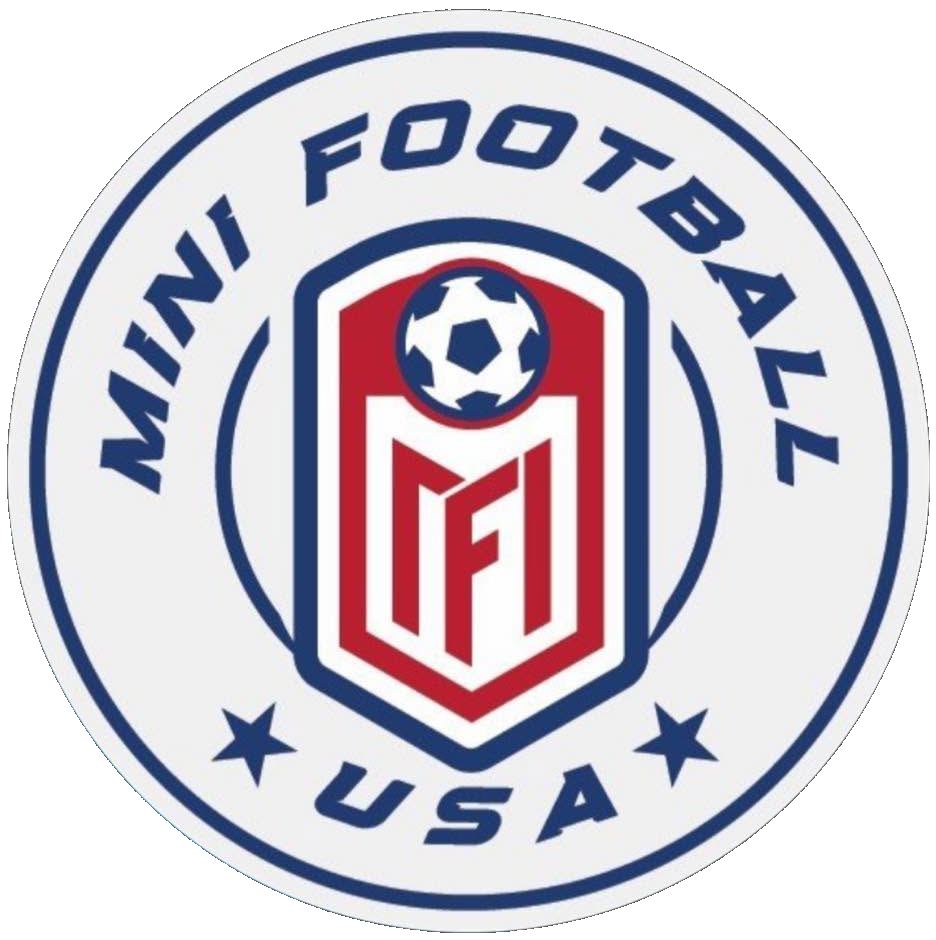
- Nickname(s): The Stars and Stripes
- Association: United States Minifootball Association
- Confederation: PAMF (America)
- Head coach: Phil Salvagio
- Most caps: Gordy Gurson and Matt Clare
- Top scorer: Gordy Gurson
First colours	Second colours

First international
- Mexico 6–4 United States (Montreal, Canada; 1 July 2008)

Biggest win
- United States 14–4 Guatemala (Texas, United States; 9 July 2021)

Biggest defeat
- Mexico 13–2 United States (California, United States; 14 September 2019)

WMF World Cup
- Appearances: 5 (first in 2015)
- Best result: Champions (2015)

The United States national minifootball team represents United States in men's international minifootball competitions and it is controlled by the United States Minifootball Association, which governs minifootball in United States. The team is one of the most successful in the world, having won the 2015 WMF World Cup.

== History ==
The team affiliated with Confederación Panamericana de Minifutbol (CPM) and the World Minifootball Federation (WMF). The first international arena match played by the U.S. National Arena Soccer Team was in July 2008 in Montreal, Canada where Mexico defeated the United States 6–4. The first international arena soccer match in the United States was held in July 2009 at NYTEX Sports Centre in North Richland Hills, Texas. The United States won the inaugural WMF World Cup in 2015 after going undefeated in group play defeating Germany and Romania in the knockout rounds en route to the final and prevailing over Mexico 5–3 in the final. Goalkeeper Danny Waltman was named tournament MVP. The team also participated in the 2017 WMF World Cup, held in Tunisia.

== Competitive records ==
Champions Runners-up Third place

- Red border color indicates tournament was held on home soil.

=== WMF World Cup ===
WMF World Cup
Year	Round	Position	Pld	W	D	L	GF	GA
(United States) 2015	Champions	1st	6	6	0	0	45	16
(Tunisia) 2017	Round of 16	13th	4	1	1	2	16	11
(Australia) 2019	Round of 16	11th	4	2	0	2	15	8
(United Arab Emirates) 2023	Round of 16	12th	4	1	2	1	12	7
(Azerbaijan) 2025	Group stage	24th	3	0	1	2	5	9
Total	Champions	5/5	21	10	4	7	93	51
