= 2023 WMF World Cup =

Minifootball tournament

كأس العالم لكرة القدم المصغرة 2023

Tournament details
- Host country: United Arab Emirates
- Dates: 26 October–4 November
- Teams: 32 (from 4 confederations)
- Venue: 1 (in 1 host city)

Final positions
- Champions: Romania (1st title)
- Runners-up: Kazakhstan
- Third place: Hungary
- Fourth place: Azerbaijan

Tournament statistics
- Matches played: 64
- Goals scored: 313 (4.89 per match)
- Top scorer(s): (Romania) Marius Gabriel Balogh (6 goals)
- Best player: (Romania) Dragos Nitu
- Best goalkeeper: (Kazakhstan) Alexandr Rushinas

The 2023 WMF World Cup was the third edition of the WMF World Cup, the biennial world championship for national minifootball teams organized by the World Minifootball Federation (WMF). The tournament was contested in Ras Al Khaimah in the United Arab Emirates between 26 October and 4 November 2023. Mexico are the defending champions. Romania defeated Kazakhstan 12–11 by penalties after a 2–2 draw in the final, to win the title.

== Venue ==
The United Arab Emirates was awarded the right to host the event on 10 June 2022. All the matches are played at the Ras Al Khaimah Minifoot Stadium in Ras Al Khaimah.

Ras Al Khaimah
Ras Al Khaimah Minifoot Stadium
Capacity: 4,500

== Teams ==
=== Participating nations ===
Team	Finals appearance	First appearance	Last appearance	Previous best performance
Albania	1st	None	None	Debut
Algeria	1st	None	None	Debut
Azerbaijan	1st	None	None	Debut
Bulgaria	1st	None	None	Debut
Czech Republic	4th	2015	2019	Champions (2017)
Egypt	1st	None	None	Debut
England	2nd	2019	2019	Group stage (2019)
France	2nd	2017	2017	Quarter-finals (2017)
Georgia	1st	None	None	Debut
Ghana	2nd	2019	2019	Round of 16 (2019)
Guatemala	3rd	2017	2019	Round of 16 (2019)
Hungary	3rd	2017	2019	Fourth place (2019)
India	4th	2015	2019	Group stage (2015, 2017, 2019)
Iraq	3rd	2017	2019	Group stage (2017, 2019)
Ireland	1st	None	None	Debut
Japan	2nd	2019	2019	Group stage (2019)
Kazakhstan	3rd	2015	2017	Round of 16 (2017)
Lebanon	3rd	2017	2019	Group stage (2017, 2019)
Libya	2nd	2017	2017	Round of 16 (2017)
Mexico (Holders)	4th	2015	2019	Champions (2019)
Montenegro	1st	None	None	Debut
Oman	1st	None	None	Debut
Portugal	3rd	2017	2019	Group stage (2017, 2019)
Romania	4th	2015	2019	Third place (2015, 2019)
Serbia	3rd	2015	2019	Round of 16 (2019)
Slovakia	2nd	2019	2019	Quarter-finals (2019)
Spain	2nd	2017	2017	Fourth place (2017)
Sudan	1st	None	None	Debut
Thailand	2nd	2019	2019	Group stage (2019)
Ukraine	2nd	2019	2019	Quarter-finals (2019)
United Arab Emirates (Hosts)	1st	None	None	Debut
United States	4th	2015	2019	Champions (2015)

=== Draw ===
Originally, the teams that were supposed to participate in the championship were Brazil, who were supposed to defend their silver medals from 2019; Lebanon and Tunisia, who withdrew because of the presence of Israel; and Israel, who did not travel to the venue due to the Gaza war.

The Brazilians were replaced by Oman, Israel was replaced by Algeria, Tunisia was replaced by Kuwait and Lebanon was replaced by Bahrain, who withdrew a few days before the start of the tournament and was replaced by Sudan. For all the replaced teams, it was not only their first participation in the WMF World Cup, but also their first international matches.

Pot 1	Pot 2	Pot 3	Pot 4
United Arab Emirates (Host); Azerbaijan; ~~Brazil~~ → Oman; Czech Republic; Hungary; Mexico; Romania; Slovakia	Bulgaria; France; Guatemala; Kazakhstan; Serbia; ~~Tunisia~~ → Kuwait; Ukraine; United States	England; Egypt; Georgia; ~~Israel~~ → Algeria; Ghana; Libya; Montenegro; Spain	Albania; India; Iraq; Ireland; Japan; ~~Lebanon~~ → ~~Bahrain~~ → Sudan; Portugal; Thailand

== Group stage ==
=== Group A ===
Pos	Team	Pld	W	D	L	GF	GA	GD	Pts	Qualification
1	Kazakhstan	3	3	0	0	25	1	+24	9	Advance to Knockout stage
2	United Arab Emirates (H)	3	2	0	1	4	2	+2	6	Advance to Knockout stage
3	Ghana	3	1	0	2	8	9	−1	3	
4	India	3	0	0	3	0	25	−25	0	

Source: WMF
(H) Hosts
26 October 2023
16:00

Kazakhstan	7–0	Ghana
Ilya Mun 9', 25'; Alexandr Kislitsyn 24'; Vitaliy Grigoryev 35'; Nursultan Zhussupov 36'; Uralbek Yegizbayev 37'; Alexey Zabogonskiy 39'

Ras Al Khaimah Minifoot Stadium, Ras Al Khaimah
26 October 2023
22:00

United Arab Emirates	1–0	India
Abhinav Dahiya 38' (o.g.)

Ras Al Khaimah Minifoot Stadium, Ras Al Khaimah

28 October 2023
16:00

Kazakhstan	16–0	India
Nursultan Zhussupov 8', 33'; Zhanibek Seitzhan 11', 50+1'; Ilya Mun 17', 31'; Yevgeniy Biryukov 20'; Aslanbek Arshkenov 22'; Baktiyar Zhushnov 24', 34', 44'; Avel Tarzhanov 27', 47'; Bakir Dyikanbayev 36', 37'; Uralbek Yegizbayev 39'

Ras Al Khaimah Minifoot Stadium, Ras Al Khaimah
28 October 2023
19:45

United Arab Emirates	2–0	Ghana
Mohamed Saswashi 3'; Mohamed Alali 43'

Ras Al Khaimah Minifoot Stadium, Ras Al Khaimah

30 October 2023
10:15

Ghana	8–0	India
Samuel Koranteng 5', 40'; Godwin Okatah 15'; Bernard Sarfo 34' (pen.); Wisdom Kofi Dompreh 42'; Emmanuel Abbam 44'; Raymond Artur 49'; Eric Philip Amoah 50'

Ras Al Khaimah Minifoot Stadium, Ras Al Khaimah
30 October 2023
19:45

United Arab Emirates	1–2	Kazakhstan
Mohamed Alsuwaidi 48'		Aslanbek Arshkenov 14'; Avel Tarzhanov 48'

Ras Al Khaimah Minifoot Stadium, Ras Al Khaimah

=== Group B ===
Pos	Team	Pld	W	D	L	GF	GA	GD	Pts	Qualification
1	Georgia	3	3	0	0	18	2	+16	9	Advance to Knockout stage
2	Mexico	3	2	0	1	7	3	+4	6	Advance to Knockout stage
3	Ireland	3	1	0	2	5	16	−11	3	
4	Guatemala	3	0	0	3	1	30	−29	0	

Source: WMF
26 October 2023
9:00

Mexico	6–0	Ireland
Carlos Gabriel Hernandéz 3'; Moises González 4'; Juan Carlos González 30'; Edgar González Diaz 31'; Daniel Ivan García 40'; Marlon Brandon Escoto 43'

Ras Al Khaimah Minifoot Stadium, Ras Al Khaimah
26 October 2023
10:15

Guatemala	0–6	Georgia
		Nugzari Gogashvili 17'; Levani Svanidze 23'; Beka Tugushi 24'; Nikoloz Koplatadze 25'; Mikheil Tevzadze 28'; Giorgi Ekseulidze 34'

Ras Al Khaimah Minifoot Stadium, Ras Al Khaimah

28 October 2023
9:00

Guatemala	0–5	Ireland
		Aindreas Doyle 13'; Tiernan Kilcoyne 19', 39'; Paul King 30'; Madine Stephen 37'

Ras Al Khaimah Minifoot Stadium, Ras Al Khaimah
28 October 2023
18:30

Mexico	1–2	Georgia
Carlos Gabriel Hernandéz Martinéz 37'		Irakli Gvetadze 21'; Levani Svanidze 39'

Ras Al Khaimah Minifoot Stadium, Ras Al Khaimah

30 October 2023
9:00

Mexico	19–1	Guatemala
Moises González 1', 19', 26'; Juan Carlos González 5'; Jorge Adrian Rios 6', 6', 48'; Edgar González Diaz 11', 14'; Daniel Ivan García 23', 23', 31'; Carlos Gabriel Hernandéz 24', 43'; Marlon Brandon Escoto 25+2'; Hiram Ruiz 35'; Uriel Zuart Paz 41'; Roberto Carlos Escalante 44', 49'		Sebastian Vasquéz 37'

Ras Al Khaimah Minifoot Stadium, Ras Al Khaimah
30 October 2023
16:00

Georgia	10–1	Ireland
Giorgi Aptsiauri 6', 16', 44'; Irakli Gvetadze 10'; Nugzari Gogashvili 12'; Nikoloz Koplatadze 19'; Mikheil Tevzadze 21'; Giorgi Gazdeliani 43' (pen.); Nikoloz Kurtanidze 46'; Levani Svanidze 49'		Rhys Gorman 37'

Ras Al Khaimah Minifoot Stadium, Ras Al Khaimah

=== Group C ===
Pos	Team	Pld	W	D	L	GF	GA	GD	Pts	Qualification
1	Czech Republic	3	3	0	0	21	1	+20	9	Advance to Knockout stage
2	Thailand	3	2	0	1	7	6	+1	6	Advance to Knockout stage
3	Ukraine	3	1	0	2	9	10	−1	3	
4	Algeria	3	0	0	3	2	22	−20	0	

Source: WMF
26 October 2023
18:30

Ukraine	9–1	Algeria
Dmytro Brovko 9'; Karim Ziani 28' (o.g.); Ramzi Bourakba 33' (o.g.); Aimene Redjemi 38' (o.g.); Ihor Kostroma 40'; Mykyta Vovchenko 42'; Andrii Slinkin 44', 47', 48'		Bourzama Abdelfettah 7'

Ras Al Khaimah Minifoot Stadium, Ras Al Khaimah
27 October 2023
17:15

Czech Republic	6–0	Thailand
Weerayut Wongchiangrak 3' (o.g.); Daniel Klíma 9'; Ondřej Paděra 17'; Richard Svoboda 22'; Daniel Kasal 27'; Daniel Žížala 29'

Ras Al Khaimah Minifoot Stadium, Ras Al Khaimah

28 October 2023
10:15

Ukraine	0–2	Thailand
		Teepanom Chinda 16'; Weerayut Wongchiangrak 50+2'

Ras Al Khaimah Minifoot Stadium, Ras Al Khaimah
28 October 2023
22:15

Czech Republic	8–1	Algeria
Daniel Klíma 6'; Ondřej Paděra 14', 50+1'; Denis Laňka 18', 30'; Daniil Doleček 25'; Daniel Žížala 27'; Tomáš Jelínek 49'		Taider Saphir Sliti 40'

Ras Al Khaimah Minifoot Stadium, Ras Al Khaimah

30 October 2023
18:30

Algeria	0–5	Thailand
		Teepanom Chinda 11'; Chaiyong Pearpong 17'; Thawatchai Dachphun 18'; Kittin Duangket 21', 29'

Ras Al Khaimah Minifoot Stadium, Ras Al Khaimah
30 October 2023
21:00

Czech Republic	7–0	Ukraine
Denis Laňka 6', 50'; David Macháček 9'; Tomáš Jelínek 16'; Jan Koudelka 25'; Daniil Doleček 27'; Ondřej Paděra 31'

Ras Al Khaimah Minifoot Stadium, Ras Al Khaimah

=== Group D ===
Pos	Team	Pld	W	D	L	GF	GA	GD	Pts	Qualification
1	Romania	3	2	1	0	13	3	+10	7	Advance to Knockout stage
2	United States	3	1	2	0	10	3	+7	5	Advance to Knockout stage
3	Spain	3	1	1	1	13	10	+3	4	
4	Sudan	3	0	0	3	7	27	−20	0	

Source: WMF
26 October 2023
17:15

United States	2–2	Spain
David Ortiz 12'; Chad Vandegriffe 33'		Yeray Abreu Martinéz 5'; Francisco José Ramiréz Garrido 32'

Ras Al Khaimah Minifoot Stadium, Ras Al Khaimah
26 October 2023
19:45

Romania	10–1	Sudan
Bogdan Covaci 7'; Ionuț Andrei Nemițanu 13'; Vlad Iulian Mocanu 17', 18', 42'; Alexandru Bourceanu 24'; Marius Gabriel Balogh 25'; Andrei Cosmin Balea 26'; Constantin Gabriel Dumitrașcu 28', 50'		Mohammed Abdelkarim Amro 39'

Ras Al Khaimah Minifoot Stadium, Ras Al Khaimah

28 October 2023
17:15

Romania	3–2	Spain
Mircea Ciprian Ungur 12'; Mircea Ioan Popa 19'; Marius Gabriel Balogh 37'		José Luis Giralte 21'; Francisco José Ramiréz Garrido 35'

Ras Al Khaimah Minifoot Stadium, Ras Al Khaimah
28 October 2023
21:00

United States	8–1	Sudan
Ian Bennett 6', 14', 32'; Franck Tayou 9' (pen.), 40'; Sebastian Mendez 14'; David Ortiz 16'; Zachary Reget 49'		Ahmed Nasreldin Ahmed 50'

Ras Al Khaimah Minifoot Stadium, Ras Al Khaimah

30 October 2023
17:15

Spain	9–5	Sudan
Anwar Mubarak Atta 15' (o.g.); Carlos Ivan Casañas 16'; Francisco José Ramiréz 25'; Cristian Jesús Suaréz 27'; Pablo Cesar Romero 30', 39'; Guillermo Bueno 32'; Robert Ivan Nuñez 33'; Oliver Rodriguéz Monserrat 34'		Mohammed Dari Siddig 10', 35'; Yousif Mamoun Ahmed 38'; Ahmed Fadil Ali Elsayed 44'; Ahmed Albashir Abdelgader 50+1'

Ras Al Khaimah Minifoot Stadium, Ras Al Khaimah
30 October 2023
22:15

Romania	0–0	United States

Ras Al Khaimah Minifoot Stadium, Ras Al Khaimah

=== Group E ===
Pos	Team	Pld	W	D	L	GF	GA	GD	Pts	Qualification
1	Bulgaria	3	3	0	0	15	0	+15	9	Advance to Knockout stage
2	Montenegro	3	2	0	1	12	5	+7	6	Advance to Knockout stage
3	Japan	3	1	0	2	14	6	+8	3	
4	Oman	3	0	0	3	2	32	−30	0	

Source: WMF
27 October 2023
9:00

Oman	1–13	Japan
Ahmed Nasser Vasser Al-Naami 8'		Shuto Ozaki 4', 5'; Inouke Tatsuya 4', 8', 12', 41'; Ryu Hamano 10'; Maeda Tatsuya 24'; Taki Keita 26', 45'; Harada Rikuto 27', 48', 49'

Ras Al Khaimah Minifoot Stadium, Ras Al Khaimah
27 October 2023
16:00

Bulgaria	3–0	Montenegro
Nedelian Kostadinov 12'; Vasil Gudzhev 39'; Svetlozar Tabakov 43'

Ras Al Khaimah Minifoot Stadium, Ras Al Khaimah

29 October 2023
16:00

Oman	1–10	Montenegro
Ahmed Nasser Vasser Al-Naami 14'		Miloš Pejaković 10'; Ivan Pejaković 15', 30', 33', 50+1'; Vasilije Bošković 16'; Bojan Jovanović 17', 49'; Jovan Kaludjerovic 37', 41'

Ras Al Khaimah Minifoot Stadium, Ras Al Khaimah
29 October 2023
21:00

Bulgaria	3–0	Japan
Lyubomir Guentchev 21', 44' (pen.); Angel Rahov 37'

Ras Al Khaimah Minifoot Stadium, Ras Al Khaimah

31 October 2023
16:00

Montenegro	2–1	Japan
Bojan Jovanović 5'; Boris Mijović 25'		Maeda Tatsuya 17'

Ras Al Khaimah Minifoot Stadium, Ras Al Khaimah
31 October 2023
18:30

Oman	0–9	Bulgaria
		Nikolay Marinov 7'; Spas Milushev 12'; Denis Ivanov 21'; Vasil Gudzhev 23'; Angel Rahov 25+1', 40'; Dimitar Aleksandrov 34', 45', 47'

Ras Al Khaimah Minifoot Stadium, Ras Al Khaimah

=== Group F ===
Pos	Team	Pld	W	D	L	GF	GA	GD	Pts	Qualification
1	Slovakia	3	2	0	1	6	4	+2	6	Advance to Knockout stage
2	England	3	1	2	0	5	4	+1	5	Advance to Knockout stage
3	France	3	1	1	1	6	6	0	4	
4	Albania	3	0	1	2	2	5	−3	1	

Source: WMF
27 October 2023
18:30

Slovakia	2–0	Albania
Boris Juhás 6'; Rudolf Beliš 34'

Ras Al Khaimah Minifoot Stadium, Ras Al Khaimah
27 October 2023
22:15

France	2–2	England
Adriano Schiavone 10'; Nadir Euvrard 44'		Ross Cable 9'; Kiye Martin 18'

Ras Al Khaimah Minifoot Stadium, Ras Al Khaimah

29 October 2023
17:15

France	3–2	Albania
Giovanni Calandrau 21'; Mohamed Bachir 27'; Nadir Euvrard 48'		Mario Biba 31'; Giovanni Calandrau 49' (o.g.)

Ras Al Khaimah Minifoot Stadium, Ras Al Khaimah
29 October 2023
22:15

Slovakia	2–3	England
Boris Juhás 28'; Adam Bombicz 38'		Siao Blackwood 20'; Dominic Morgan-Griffiths 47'; Charlie Kuehn 50+2'

Ras Al Khaimah Minifoot Stadium, Ras Al Khaimah

31 October 2023
17:15

England	0–0	Albania

Ras Al Khaimah Minifoot Stadium, Ras Al Khaimah
31 October 2023
19:45

Slovakia	2–1	France
Adam Bombicz 3'; Tomáš Mikluš 43'		Giovanni Calandrau 43'

Ras Al Khaimah Minifoot Stadium, Ras Al Khaimah

=== Group G ===
Pos	Team	Pld	W	D	L	GF	GA	GD	Pts	Qualification
1	Azerbaijan	3	3	0	0	9	2	+7	9	Advance to Knockout stage
2	Egypt	3	2	0	1	7	6	+1	6	Advance to Knockout stage
3	Iraq	3	0	1	2	7	10	−3	1	
4	Kuwait	3	0	1	2	6	11	−5	1	

Source: WMF
26 October 2023
23:15

Egypt	2–0	Kuwait
Ahmed Jaber Ibrahim 15'; Adel Magdy Kamel 39'

Ras Al Khaimah Minifoot Stadium, Ras Al Khaimah
27 October 2023
21:00

Azerbaijan	2–0	Iraq
Mirmehdi Rzayev 15'; Elvin Alizada 28' (pen.)

Ras Al Khaimah Minifoot Stadium, Ras Al Khaimah

29 October 2023
9:00

Kuwait	5–5	Iraq
Hayder Ahmed Ali 3' (o.g.); Saleh Fuad Malak 25'; Ala Ham 40'; Fahad Manea Alajmi 43', 49' (pen.)		Hayder Ahmed Ali 20' (pen.), 21'; Ameen Abas Ali 28'; Mustafa Kareem Al Furaiji 39'; Bani Lam Muthana 45'

Ras Al Khaimah Minifoot Stadium, Ras Al Khaimah
29 October 2023
18:30

Azerbaijan	4–1	Egypt
Ravan Karimov 8', 42'; Seymur Mammadov 37'; Tamkin Khalilzade 45'		Adel Magdy Kamel 2'

Ras Al Khaimah Minifoot Stadium, Ras Al Khaimah

31 October 2023
9:00

Egypt	4–2	Iraq
Marwan Issa Bakri 9'; Ahmed Jaber Ibrahim 31'; Mahmoud El Sayed 35'; Jamal Mohammed 44'		Mohammed Bahadli Abdu Azez 12'; Hayder Ahmed Ali 25+2' (pen.)

Ras Al Khaimah Minifoot Stadium, Ras Al Khaimah
31 October 2023
21:00

Azerbaijan	3–1	Kuwait
Jafar Jafarov 8'; Mirmehdi Rzayev 37'; Tamkin Khalilzade 44'		Fahad Ahmad Alfraij 1'

Ras Al Khaimah Minifoot Stadium, Ras Al Khaimah

=== Group H ===
Pos	Team	Pld	W	D	L	GF	GA	GD	Pts	Qualification
1	Hungary	3	3	0	0	4	1	+3	9	Advance to Knockout stage
2	Portugal	3	2	0	1	7	3	+4	6	Advance to Knockout stage
3	Serbia	3	1	0	2	7	8	−1	3	
4	Libya	3	0	0	3	5	11	−6	0	

Source: WMF
27 October 2023
10:15

Serbia	5–4	Libya
Dušan Pećić 17'; Marko Živcukin 20', 47'; Čedomir Tomčić 31'; Goran Nedić 36'		Abraheem Khalleefah 23'; Mohammed Abdulhamid 25'; Mohamed Ibrahim Shahout 40'; Salih Jasam Ahmed Othman 49' (pen.)

Ras Al Khaimah Minifoot Stadium, Ras Al Khaimah
27 October 2023
19:45

Hungary	1–0	Portugal
Miklós Barabás 46'

Ras Al Khaimah Minifoot Stadium, Ras Al Khaimah

29 October 2023
10:15

Hungary	2–1	Libya
Bence Lovász 22'; Gábor Kiss 50+1'		Mohammed Bilal Adrees 40'

Ras Al Khaimah Minifoot Stadium, Ras Al Khaimah
29 October 2023
19:45

Serbia	2–3	Portugal
Milan Čičić 13'; Zarije Gojković 37'		Tiago Lapa 16', 25'; Eduardo Rajão 33'

Ras Al Khaimah Minifoot Stadium, Ras Al Khaimah

31 October 2023
10:15

Libya	0–4	Portugal
		Paulo Freitas 25+1'; José Campos 28'; Mahmoud Basheer Aboub 49' (o.g.); Tiago Lapa 50+1'

Ras Al Khaimah Minifoot Stadium, Ras Al Khaimah
31 October 2023
22:15

Hungary	1–0	Serbia
Miklós Barabás 50+2'

Ras Al Khaimah Minifoot Stadium, Ras Al Khaimah

== Knockout stage ==
=== Bracket ===
Eighth-finals
1 November – Ras Al Khaimah
Georgia	1 (2)
United Arab Emirates (p)	1 (3)
1 November – Ras Al Khaimah
Romania	7
Thailand	0
1 November – Ras Al Khaimah
Slovakia	5
Montenegro	2
1 November – Ras Al Khaimah
Hungary	3
Egypt	0
1 November – Ras Al Khaimah
Kazakhstan (p)	0 (2)
Mexico	0 (1)
1 November – Ras Al Khaimah
Czech Republic (a.e.t.)	4
United States	2
1 November – Ras Al Khaimah
Azerbaijan	3
Portugal	0
1 November – Ras Al Khaimah
Bulgaria	2
England	1

Quarter-finals
2 November – Ras Al Khaimah
United Arab Emirates	0
Romania	2
2 November – Ras Al Khaimah
Slovakia	0
Hungary	1
2 November – Ras Al Khaimah
Kazakhstan (p)	3 (3)
Czech Republic	3 (2)
2 November – Ras Al Khaimah
Azerbaijan	3
Bulgaria	1

Semi-finals
3 November – Ras Al Khaimah
Romania	3
Hungary	0
3 November – Ras Al Khaimah
Kazakhstan	3
Azerbaijan	2

Final
4 November – Ras Al Khaimah
Romania (p)	2 (12)
Kazakhstan	2 (11)
Third place play-off
4 November – Ras Al Khaimah
Hungary	3
Azerbaijan	1

=== Round of 16 ===
1 November 2023
9:00

Georgia	1–1 (a.e.t.)	United Arab Emirates
Beka Tugushi 6'		Mohamed Khalil 50'
Penalties
Giorgi Chokhonelidze (penalty missed); Nikoloz Koplatadze (penalty scored); Nikoloz Kurtanidze (penalty scored)	2–3	(penalty scored) Ibrahim Bader; (penalty scored) Mohamed Saswashi; (penalty scored) Mohamed Alali

Ras Al Khaimah Minifoot Stadium, Ras Al Khaimah

1 November 2023
10:30

Romania	7–0	Thailand
Andrei Gabriel Șumălan 9', 15'; Andrei Cătălin Ferik 22'; Alexandru Bourceanu 33'; Gabriel Constantin Dumitrașcu 37'; Mircea Ciprian Ungur 37'; Vasile Ovidiu Pop 50+1' (pen.)

Ras Al Khaimah Minifoot Stadium, Ras Al Khaimah

1 November 2023
15:30

Kazakhstan	2–1	Mexico
Alexandr Kislitsyn 52'; Alexandr Rushinas 56'		Edgar González Diaz 58'

Ras Al Khaimah Minifoot Stadium, Ras Al Khaimah

1 November 2023
17:00

Czech Republic	4–2 (a.e.t.)	United States
Ondřej Bíro 10'; Denis Laňka 37'; Daniel Klíma 43'; Jan Koudelka 50'		Franck Tayou 29'; Stefan Mijatovic 44'

Ras Al Khaimah Minifoot Stadium, Ras Al Khaimah

1 November 2023
18:30

Azerbaijan	3–0	Portugal
Mirmehdi Rzayev 30'; Elvin Alizada 46'; Ravan Karimov 50'

Ras Al Khaimah Minifoot Stadium, Ras Al Khaimah

1 November 2023
20:00

Bulgaria	2–1	England
Iavor Guentchev 20'; Nedelian Kostadinov 45' (pen.)		Dominic Morgan-Griffiths 41'

Ras Al Khaimah Minifoot Stadium, Ras Al Khaimah

1 November 2023
21:30

Slovakia	5–2	Montenegro
Boris Juhás 13'; Marek Blažej 20'; Jaroslav Repa 22'; Filip Kis 42'; Tomáš Mikluš 50'		Bojan Jovanović 4'; Boris Mijović 36'

Ras Al Khaimah Minifoot Stadium, Ras Al Khaimah

1 November 2023
23:00

Hungary	3–0	Egypt
András Dunai 9', 15'; Jamal Mohammed Gamal 49' (o.g.)

Ras Al Khaimah Minifoot Stadium, Ras Al Khaimah

=== Quarterfinals ===
2 November 2023
18:00

United Arab Emirates	0–2	Romania
		Andrei Gabriel Șumălan 2'; Andrei Cosmin Balea 19'

Ras Al Khaimah Minifoot Stadium, Ras Al Khaimah

2 November 2023
19:30

Kazakhstan	3–3 (a.e.t.)	Czech Republic
Alexandr Kislitsyn 6'; Baktiyar Zhushnov 40'; Aslanbek Arshkenov 41'		Daniel Klíma 10'; Ondřej Paděra 15'; Alexandr Rushinas 34' (o.g.)
Penalties
Vitaliy Grigoryev (penalty scored); Zhanibek Seitzhan (penalty missed); Alexandr Kislitsyn (penalty missed); Alexey Zabogonskiy (penalty scored); Daniyar Togaibayev (penalty scored)	3–2	(penalty missed) Jaroslav Kubát; (penalty scored) Tomáš Jelínek; (penalty missed) Jan Koudelka; (penalty scored) Daniil Doleček; (penalty missed) Richard Svoboda

Ras Al Khaimah Minifoot Stadium, Ras Al Khaimah

2 November 2023
21:00

Azerbaijan	3–1	Bulgaria
Vusal Isayev 28'; Ravan Karimov 31'; Mirmehdi Rzayev 36'		Vali Gafarov 40' (o.g.)

Ras Al Khaimah Minifoot Stadium, Ras Al Khaimah

2 November 2023
22:30

Slovensko Slovakia	0–1	Hungary
		Gábor Kiss 44'

Ras Al Khaimah Minifoot Stadium, Ras Al Khaimah

=== Semifinals ===
3 November 2023
19:00

Romania	3–0	Hungary
Mircea Ciprian Ungur 5'; Mircea Ioan Popa 27'; Marius Gabriel Balogh 36'

Ras Al Khaimah Minifoot Stadium, Ras Al Khaimah

3 November 2023
20:30

Kazakhstan	3–2	Azerbaijan
Nursultan Zhussupov 30'; Zhanibek Seitzhan 41'; Uralbek Yegizbayev 45'		Eshgin Taghiyev 18', 50'

Ras Al Khaimah Minifoot Stadium, Ras Al Khaimah

=== Third-place match ===
4 November 2023
18:00

Hungary	3–1	Azerbaijan
Dávid Ladányi 3'; Zsombor Kövesdi 12'; Viktor Kozó 47'		Elvin Alizada 44'

Ras Al Khaimah Minifoot Stadium, Ras Al Khaimah

=== Final ===
4 November 2023
20:00

Romania	2–2 (a.e.t.)	Kazakhstan
Marius Gabriel Balogh 49' (pen.), 50+2'		Mircea Ciprian Ungur 25' (o.g.); Avel Tarzhanov 37'
Penalties
Marius Gabriel Balogh (penalty scored); Andrei Gabriel Șumălan (penalty scored); Vasile Ovidiu Pop (penalty scored); Mircea Ciprian Ungur (penalty missed); Vlad Iulian Mocanu (penalty scored); Alexandru Bourceanu (penalty scored); Andrei Cătălin Ferik (penalty scored); Andrei Cosmin Balea (penalty scored); Viorel Ionuț Neacșa (penalty scored); Dragoș Constantin Nițu (penalty scored); Saron Ionuț Chirică (penalty scored); Ioan Mircea Popa (penalty missed); Ionuț Andrei Nemițanu (penalty scored); Constantin Gabriel Dumitrașcu (penalty missed); Bogdan Covaci (penalty scored)	12–11	(penalty scored) Vitaliy Grigoryev; (penalty scored) Alexey Zabogonskiy; (penalty scored) Daniyar Togaibayev; (penalty missed) Uralbek Yegizbayev; (penalty scored) Alexandr Kislitsyn; (penalty scored) Nursultan Zhussupov; (penalty scored) Aslanbek Arshkenov; (penalty scored) Baktiyar Zhushnov; (penalty scored) Zhanibek Seitzhan; (penalty scored) Avel Tarzhanov; (penalty scored) Ilya Mun; (penalty missed) Andrey Mironov; (penalty scored) Alexandr Rushinas; (penalty missed) Bakir Dyikanbayev; (penalty missed) Yevgeniy Biryukov

Ras Al Khaimah Minifoot Stadium, Ras Al Khaimah

== Awards ==
The following awards were given at the conclusion of the tournament:

Best Player
(Romania) Dragos Nitu
Top Scorer
(Romania) Marius Gabriel Balogh
(6 goals)
Best goalkeeper
(Kazakhstan) Alexandr Rushinas
