= European Minifootball Federation =

International sports governing body

- Abbreviation: EMF
- Formation: 25 March 2012; 14 years ago
- Type: Sports organisation
- Headquarters: Prague, Czech Republic
- Region served: Europe
- Members: 34 full member associations
- President: Borislav Alexandrov
- Vice-president: Gianluca Finazzi
- General secretary: Ivan Ivanov
- Main organ: General assembly
- Parent organization: WMF
- Website: www.minifootball.eu

The European Minifootball Federation (EMF) is the administrative body for 5-a-side version of minifootball in Europe. It is one of five continental confederations of its governing body, the World Minifootball Federation. EMF consists of 34 national associations.

== History and membership ==
EMF was founded in a meeting held in Prague, Czech Republic, from 23–25 March 2012. EMF started with 11 members and currently has 29 full-time federation members.

== Members ==
Members as listed on EMF website:

- Albania
- Austria
- Azerbaijan
- Belgium
- Bosnia and Herzegovina
- Bulgaria
- Croatia
- Czech Republic
- Estonia
- Greece
- (Georgia (country)) Georgia
- Hungary
- (Republic of Ireland) Ireland
- Israel
- Italy
- Kazakhstan
- Kosovo
- Lithuania
- Moldova
- Montenegro
- Netherlands
- North Macedonia
- Poland
- Portugal
- Romania
- Russia
- Serbia
- Slovakia
- Slovenia
- Spain
- Switzerland
- Turkey
- Ukraine
- United Kingdom

== Competitions ==
EMF's main competition is EMF EURO for national teams, held annually from 2012 to 2018. In 2019 EMF General assembly decided to organize EMF EURO every 2 years in rotation with WMF World Championship. EMF's main club competition is the EMF Champions League. In addition, EMF organizes Euro Business Cup for corporate teams.

== Competitions ==
Competition	Year	Champions	Next edition
National teams (Men's)
EMF EURO	2026	Azerbaijan	
EMF Nations Games	2025	Slovakia	
Club teams (Men's)
EMF Champions League	2025	(Romania) FC Nova Vita Târgu-Mureș	
Euro Business Cup	2025	(Bulgaria) Sesame Orbit	
EMF Euro Cup	2025	(Romania) ACS Arsenal Iași	
EMF Euro Cup Master	2025	(Romania) Liriada Râșnov	
EMF Euro Cup 7S	2025	(Czech Republic) FK Hoverla Praha	
Club teams (Women's)
EMF Champions League Women's	2025	(Slovakia) Spartak Myjava	

== Major tournament records ==
=== WMF World Cup ===
- 1st — Champion
- 2nd — Runner-up
- 3rd — Third place
- GS — Group stage
- — Host(s)

Teams	(United States) 2015	(Tunisia) 2017	(Australia) 2019	(United Arab Emirates) 2023	Years
Albania				GS	1
Azerbaijan				4th	1
Bulgaria				QF	1
Czech Republic	5th	1st	5th	QF	4
England			25th	R16	1
France		8th		GS	2
Germany	8th				1
Georgia				R16	1
Hungary		6th	4th	3rd	3
Ireland				GS	1
Kazakhstan	11th	11th			2
Moldova			10th		1
Montenegro				R16	1
Portugal		18th	28th	R16	2
Romania	3rd	9th	3rd	1st	4
Russia	9th	10th			2
Serbia	10th		12th	GS	3
Slovakia			7th	QF	2
Spain		4th		GS	2
Switzerland			22nd		1
Ukraine			8th	GS	2

=== WMF Continental Cup ===
Teams	(Tunisia) 2019	Years
England	4th	1
Switzerland	GS	1
Romania	3rd	1
Czech Republic	1st	1

=== WMF Women’s World Cup ===
Teams	(Ukraine) 2021	Years
Ukraine	GS	1
Moldova	2nd	1
Switzerland	GS	1
Serbia	3rd	1

=== U23 WMF World Cup ===
Teams	(Slovakia) 2018	(Ukraine) 2021	Years
Moldova		3rd	1
Ukraine		GS	1
Hungary	QF		1
Slovakia	2nd	GS	2
Slovenia	GS		1
Czech Republic	1st	2nd	2
Georgia		GS	1
Russia	QF		1
Switzerland	GS		1
United Kingdom	QF		1
Austria	GS		1
Italy	4Th		1
