= 2015 WMF World Cup =

Minifootball tournament

Tournament details
- Host country: United States
- Dates: 21–29 March
- Teams: 12 (from 3 confederations)
- Venues: 9 (in 9 host cities)

Final positions
- Champions: United States (1st title)
- Runners-up: Mexico
- Third place: Brazil; Romania

Tournament statistics
- Matches played: 24
- Goals scored: 276 (11.5 per match)
- Top scorer(s): (United States) Kraig Chiles (10 goals)
- Best player: (United States) Danny Waltman

The 2015 WMF World Cup was the inaugural edition of the WMF World Cup, the biennial world championship for national minifootball teams organized by the World Minifootball Federation (WMF). The tournament was contested in nine cities across the United States during March 21-29, 2015. Hosts United States defeated Mexico 5–3 in the final, to win the title.

== Venues ==
Host cities included: Allen, Texas (suburban Dallas); Park City, Kansas; Ontario, California; Rochester, New York; Taylor, Michigan; Flint, Michigan; San Diego; Tulsa, Oklahoma; and Chicago (Hoffman Estates).

Allen, Texas	Park City, Kansas	Ontario, California
Allen Event Center	Hartman Arena	Citizens Business Bank Arena
Capacity: 6,006	Capacity: 5,000	Capacity: 9,736
Taylor, Michigan	Flint, Michigan	Rochester, New York
Taylor Sportsplex	Perani Arena and Event Center	Blue Cross Arena
Capacity: 1,000	Capacity: 4,021	Capacity: 10,669
2015 WMF World Cup (the United States)
San Diego	Tulsa, Oklahoma	Chicago (Hoffman Estates)
Valley View Casino Center	Expo Square Pavilion	Sears Centre Arena
Capacity: 12,000	Capacity: 6,311	Capacity: 8,362

== Teams ==
=== Participating nations ===
- Brazil
- Canada
- Czech Republic
- El Salvador
- Germany
- India
- Kazakhstan
- Mexico
- Romania
- Russia
- Serbia
- United States (Host)

== Group stage ==
=== Group A ===
Pos	Team	Pld	W	D	L	GF	GA	GD	Pts	Qualification
1	United States (H)	3	3	0	0	24	8	+16	9	Advance to knockout stage
2	Czech Republic	3	1	1	1	16	14	+2	4	Advance to knockout stage
3	El Salvador	3	1	1	1	16	17	−1	4	Advance to knockout stage
4	Kazakhstan	3	0	0	3	8	25	−17	0	

Source: WMF
(H) Hosts
23 March 2015
18:00

Czech Republic	5–5	El Salvador
Robin Demeter 8'; Jan Koudelka 20', 41'; Ondřej Paděra 57', 58'	Report	Halil Jam Monterrosa 15', 25', 29'; Cesar Espana 44'; John Lopez 57'

Citizens Business Bank Arena, Ontario, California
23 March 2015
19:30

Kazakhstan	1–10	United States
Kairat Imanalin 15'	Report	Matt Clare 4', 38', 57'; Kraig Chiles 18', 40'; Brian Farber 25'; Felipe Gonzalez 26'; Evan McNeley 26'; Chiky Luna 56'; Enrique Tovar 58'

Citizens Business Bank Arena, Ontario, California

24 March 2015
18:00

Kazakhstan	4–7	Czech Republic
Kanat Achmetov 16', 51'; Kairat Kulbarakov 23', 38'	Report	Jakub Göth 3', 22'; Jakub Slunéčko 19', 59'; Čeněk Cenek 33'; Robin Demeter 37'; Ondřej Paděra 41'

Citizens Business Bank Arena, Ontario, California
24 March 2015
19:30

El Salvador	3–9	United States
Halil Jam Monterrosa 16', 39'; John Lopez 37'	Report	Chiky Luna 8', 58'; Kraig Chiles 10', 32' (pen.); Gordy Gurson 21'; Brian Harris 26', 44'; Matt Clare 33', 55'

Citizens Business Bank Arena, Ontario, California

25 March 2015
18:00

El Salvador	8–3	Kazakhstan
Javier Ayala-Hill 14', 57'; Irvin Arevalo 15', 45'; Anibal Echeverria 15', 53'; Kevin Sanchez 16'; Jose Monterroza 49'		Stanislav Kononeko 15'; Alibek Kistaubayev 35'; Kanat Achmetov 56'

Valley View Casino Center, San Diego, California
25 March 2015
19:30

Czech Republic	4–5	United States
Čeněk Cenek 28', 36'; Ondřej Paděra 33'; Jan Koudelka 55'	Report	Matt Clare 6'; Brian Harris 19'; Enrique Tovar 22'; Pat Healey 57'; Evan McNeley 58'

Valley View Casino Center, San Diego, California

=== Group B ===
Pos	Team	Pld	W	D	L	GF	GA	GD	Pts	Qualification
1	Mexico	3	3	0	0	49	4	+45	9	Advance to knockout stage
2	Romania	3	2	0	1	31	9	+22	6	Advance to knockout stage
3	Germany	3	1	0	2	32	17	+15	3	Advance to knockout stage
4	India	3	0	0	3	1	83	−82	0	

Source: WMF
21 March 2015
17:00

Germany	1–9	Mexico
Marc Windecker 3'		Byron Alvarez 1', 46'; Damian Garcia 3', 16'; Efrain Martinez 3'; Rodrigo Flores 31'; Raymundo Reza 31'; Omar Santillan 46'; Edgar Quintin Vazquez 52'

Allen Event Center, Allen, Texas
21 March 2015
19:00

Romania	21–0	India
Nicolae Dan Constandana 1'; George Adrian Calugareanu 1', 16'; Gabriel Cosmin Craciun 1', 1', 16', 31'; Ioan Mircea Popa 16', 16'; Gabriel Tanase 16', 31', 48', 60'; Alin Cosmin Iacob 31', 48'; Toma Vincene 31', 31'; Razvan Dumitru Radu 31'; Radu Burciu 46'; Miroslav Cosmin Nicolin 46'; Iulian Apostol 46'

Allen Event Center, Allen, Texas

22 March 2015
14:00

India	1–29	Germany
Varun Kishor Jadeja 36'		Daniel Jagenburg 2', 19', 42', 46', 53'; Marius Ebbers 6', 13', 17', 20', 34'; Tigin Yaglioglu 8', 24', 32'; Boris Vertkin 13', 22', 27', 39', 47', 53'; Kilian Depuhl 15', 38'; Marc Windecker 19', 23', 30', 49'; Micha Alexander 21'; Michael Fritz 31', 45'; Timur Abali 31', 45'

Hartman Arena, Wichita, Kansas
22 March 2015
16:00

Romania	3–7	Mexico
Nicolae Dan Constandana 17', 23'; Ioan Mircea Popa 51'		Raymundo Reza 5'; Eduardo Velez 29'; Miguel Vaca 35'; Rodrigo Flores 39'; Efrain Martinez 49'; Omar Quiroz 52'; Byron Alvarez 57'

Hartman Arena, Wichita, Kansas

23 March 2015
18:00

India	0–33	Mexico
		Raymundo Reza 2', 37'; Edgar Quintin Vazquez 3', 29'; Bogar Moreno 5', 39', 55'; Miguel Resendes 6', 12', 18', 28', 36'; Efrain Martinez 7', 14', 38', 53'; Rodrigo Flores 12', 19'; Eduardo Velez 13', 21'; Omar Santillan 14', 24'; Byron Alvarez 17', 29', 30', 49'; Miguel Vaca 33', 36', 47'; Omar Quiroz 41', 43'; Damian Garcia 26', 42'

Hartman Arena, Wichita, Kansas
23 March 2015
19:30

Romania	7–2	Germany
Radu Burciu 1', 27'; Alin Cosmin Iacob 6', 37'; Gabriel Tanase 21'; George Adrian Calugareanu 44'; Razvan Dumitru Radu 58'		Boris Vertkin 23'; Daniel Jagenburg 53'

Hartman Arena, Wichita, Kansas

=== Group C ===
Pos	Team	Pld	W	D	L	GF	GA	GD	Pts	Qualification
1	Brazil	3	3	0	0	26	12	+14	9	Advance to knockout stage
2	Canada	3	1	1	1	20	19	+1	4	Advance to knockout stage
3	Russia	3	0	2	1	16	21	−5	2	
4	Serbia	3	0	1	2	16	26	−10	1	

Source: WMF
23 March 2015
19:00

Canada	10–6	Serbia
Ian Bennett 2'; Jocelyn Roy 8', 14'; Freddy Moojen 15', 23'; Lucas Ferritto 38'; David Kadoic 48', 53'; Pascal Aoun 55', 56'		Slobodan Aleksov 9', 26', 58'; Milos Šćepanović 42'; Miki Djerisilo 43'; Milan Ivanovic 55' (pen.)

Taylor Sportsplex, Taylor, Michigan
23 March 2015
19:00

Russia	4–9	Brazil
Konstantin Golovskoi 7', 55'; Valery Likhobabenko 38'; Evgeny Marishin 43'		Pablo Da Silva 1'; Marcio Leite 2', 14'; Daniel Martini Mattos 8', 53', 56'; Renan Dias Manini 49'; Elmo Neto 58'; Luan Sales Oliveira 59'

Blue Cross Arena, Rochester, New York

24 March 2015
18:00

Russia	6–6	Serbia
Evgeny Marishin 9', 15', 39'; Sergey Dolmatov 44', 58'; Maxim Kovalchuk 54'		Milos Šćepanović 16', 48', 36' (pen.); Slobodan Aleksov 26'; Miki Djerisilo 54', 59'

Perani Arena, Flint, Michigan
24 March 2015
19:30

Brazil	7–4	Canada
Elmo Neto 3', 53'; Daniel Martini Mattos 5'; Mauricio Salles 8'; Dias Tiguinho 14'; Lucas Bunster Almeida 18'; Ricardinho Sobreira 32'		Joshua Bennett 12'; Freddy Moojen 29', 52'; Olivier Babineau 44'

Perani Arena, Flint, Michigan

25 March 2015
18:00

Russia	6–6	Canada
Vladimir Chitaya 10', 24', 58'; Konstantin Golovskoi 22', 56'; Valery Likhobabenko 49'		Freddy Moojen 15', 22', 44'; Ian Bennett 17'; Pascal Aoun 19'; Anthony Santilli 58'

Perani Arena, Flint, Michigan
25 March 2015
19:30

Serbia	4–10	Brazil
Milan Ivanovic 18'; Boris Gujic 35'; Michael Grba 41'; Mirko Medić 58'		Mauricio Salles 10', 21', 55'; Renan Dias Manini 16'; Vitor Diniz 31'; Dias Tiguinho 37'; Marcos Chantel 44'; Sanaldo Freitas De Carvalho 48'; Marcio Leite 54', 56'

Perani Arena, Flint, Michigan

=== Ranking of third placed teams ===
Pos	Team	Pld	W	D	L	GF	GA	GD	Pts	Qualification
1	El Salvador	3	1	1	1	16	17	−1	4	Advance to knockout stage
2	Germany	3	1	0	2	32	17	+15	3	Advance to knockout stage
3	Russia	3	0	2	1	16	21	−5	2	

Source: WMF

== Knockout stage ==
In the knockout stage, the eight teams play a single-elimination tournament.

=== Bracket ===
Quarterfinals
26 March – Flint, Michigan
Brazil	7
Czech Republic	3
26 March – Tulsa, Oklahoma
Mexico	12
El Salvador	0
26 March – Tulsa, Oklahoma
Romania	5
Canada	0
27 March – Tulsa, Oklahoma
United States	9
Germany	2

Semifinals
28 March – Hoffman Estates, Illinois
Brazil	5 (2)
Mexico (p)	5 (3)
28 March – Hoffman Estates, Illinois
Romania	3
United States	7

Final
29 March – Hoffman Estates, Illinois
Mexico	3
United States	5

=== Quarterfinals ===
26 March 2015
19:00

Brazil	7–3	Czech Republic
Mauricio Salles 9'; Marcio Leite 11'; Elmo Neto 12'; Luan Sales Oliveira 22', 51'; Daniel Martini Mattos 29'; Ricardinho Sobreira 33'		Robin Demeter 10'; David Bednář 39'; Michal Uhlíř 49'

Perani Arena, Flint, Michigan

26 March 2015
19:00

Mexico	12–0	El Salvador
Omar Santillan 6'; Byron Alvarez 18', 56'; Miguel Vaca 24', 48'; Bogar Moreno 36'; Damian Garcia 38'; Rodrigo Flores 41'; Jair Aleman 42'; Miguel Resendes 49'; Raymundo Reza 51'; Edgar Quintin Vazquez 57'

Expo Square Pavilion, Tulsa, Oklahoma

26 March 2015
20:30

Romania	5–0 (Awarded)	Canada

Expo Square Pavilion, Tulsa, Oklahoma

27 March 2015
19:30

United States	9–2	Germany
Kraig Chiles 6', 16'; John Sosa 16'; Tony Donatelli 22', 26', 53'; Matt Clare 35', 52'; Jeff Hughes 45'	Report	Marc Windecker 40'; Massud Asiel-Sarmie 58'

Expo Square Pavilion, Tulsa, Oklahoma

=== Semifinals ===
28 March 2015
17:30

Brazil	5–5	Mexico
Mauricio Salles 17' (pen.); Daniel Martini Mattos 34'; Elmo Neto 46', 55'; Marcio Leite 57'		Miguel Vaca 9'; Miguel Resendes 18'; Rodrigo Flores 23'; Eduardo Velez 29', 55'
Penalties
Luan Sales Oliveira (penalty missed); Mauricio Salles (penalty missed); Dias Tiguinho (penalty scored); Marcio Leite (penalty scored); Daniel Martini Mattos (penalty missed); Ricardinho Sobreira (penalty missed)	2–3	(penalty missed) Efrain Martinez; (penalty scored) Omar Santillan; (penalty missed) Miguel Vaca; (penalty scored) Eduardo Velez; (penalty missed) Bogar Moreno; (penalty scored) Jair Aleman

Sears Centre, Hoffman Estates, Illinois

28 March 2015
19:30

Romania	3–7	United States
George Adrian Calugareanu 53', 54'; Radu Burciu 56'	Report	Chiky Luna 4'; Brian Harris 15', 49'; Evan McNeley 17'; Kraig Chiles 19', 29'; Gordy Gurson 53'

Sears Centre, Hoffman Estates, Illinois

=== Final ===
29 March 2015
17:00

Mexico	3–5	United States
Miguel Vaca 25'; Rodrigo Flores 44'; Omar Quiroz 59'	Report	Pat Healey 15'; Brian Harris 23'; Felipe Gonzalez 27'; Kraig Chiles 28', 44'

Sears Centre, Hoffman Estates, Illinois

== Awards ==
The following awards were given at the conclusion of the tournament:

Best Player
(United States) Danny Waltman
Top Scorer
(United States) Kraig Chiles
(10 goals)
