= AMC =

AMC or amc may refer to:

== Arts and media ==
=== Film and television ===
- AMC Theatres (officially AMC Entertainment Holdings, Inc.; originally American Multi-Cinema), an American movie theater chain
- AMC Global Media (2011–2026: AMC Networks), an American entertainment company
  - AMC (TV channel), named American Movie Classics from 1984 to 2002
  - AMC+, a video streaming service
  - AMC Networks International
    - AMC (Asian TV channel)
    - AMC (European TV channel)
    - AMC (African and Middle Eastern TV channel)
- Australian Multiplex Cinemas, an Australian cinema chain
- All My Children, an American television soap opera

=== Music ===
==== Musicians ====
- A.M.C, a British drum-and-bass DJ and producer

==== Music organizations ====
- Adelaide Music Collective, founded by David Day (broadcaster)
- AM Conspiracy, American alternative metal band
- American Music Center, a former nonprofit organization
- American Music Club, a band
- Asian Music Chart, a part of Official Charts Company
- Asian Music Circle, an organization promoting Indian and other Asian art and culture
- Asian Music Circuit, a charitable organization
- Australian Music Centre, an art music organization

=== Video games ===
- Attack of the Mutant Camels, 1983
- A.M.C.: Astro Marine Corps, 1989

=== Other uses in arts and media ===
- AMC – Andrzej M. Chołdzyński, a Polish studio for architecture from Warsaw
- AMC (newspaper), published in Botswana by Africa Media Corporation

== Education ==
- Academia Mexicana de Ciencias, a Mexican education organization
- AMC Institutions, India
- American Mathematics Competitions
- Archif Menywod Cymru, a Welsh organization, also known as Women's Archive Wales
- Archive of Modern Conflict, a British publisher
- Australian Maritime College, Tasmania
- Australian Mathematics Competition

== Finance ==
- Advance market commitment, a guarantee to buy a medicine if developed
- Agricultural Mortgage Corporation
- Allied Military Currency, used during World War II
- Ameriquest Mortgage Company
- Annual management charge
- Asset management company
- Association management company
- China Asset Management, or ChinaAMC

== Government ==
- Agartala Municipal Council, the governing body of Agartala, India
- Ahmedabad Municipal Corporation, the governing body of Ahmedabad, India
- Alexander Maconochie Centre, a prison in the Australian Capital Territory
- Arizona-Mexico Commission, a nonprofit organization
- Australian Multicultural Council, an Australian government agency
- Global Affairs Canada (French: Affaires mondiales Canada)

== Military and transportation ==
=== Military non-transportation ===
- Allied Military Currency, used during World War II
- Archive of Modern Conflict, a British publisher
- Army Medical College, Pakistan

=== Military transportation ===
- Army Materiel Command, a command of the U.S. Army
- Air Materiel Command of the U.S. Air Force
- Air Mobility Command, a major command of the U.S. Air Force
- Australian Marine Complex, a naval maintenance complex in Western Australia
- Coastal minesweeper (AMc), a U.S. Navy hull classification
- Armed Merchant Cruiser, a type of UK Royal Navy ship
- AMC 34, a French tank used prior to World War II
- AMC 35, a French tank used during World War II

=== Non-military transportation ===
- American Motors Corporation, an American automobile company
- Amalgamated Motor Cycles Ltd, a British motorcycle manufacturer
- AMC Airlines, an Egyptian charter airline
- Air Malta, a former Maltese airline (ICAO code: AMC)

== Science and technology ==
=== Medicine ===
==== Medical institutions ====
- Academic Medical Center, the University of Amsterdam hospital in the Netherlands
- Academic medical centre
- Albany Medical College, United States
- Andhra Medical College, Andhra Pradesh, India
- Arab Medical Center, Amman, Jordan
- Army Medical College, Pakistan
- Asan Medical Center, Seoul, Korea
- Australian Medical Council
- Ayub Medical College, Pakistan

==== Other uses in medicine ====
- Advance market commitment, a guarantee to buy a medicine if developed
- Amoxicillin, an antibiotic
- Amylmetacresol, an antiseptic used in throat lozenges
- Arthrogryposis multiplex congenita, a congenital disorder
- Atlantic Modal Cluster, a set of haplotypes

=== Telecommunications ===
- Adaptive modulation and coding, in wireless communications
- Advanced Mezzanine Card, a telecommunications specification
- Albanian Mobile Communications, a telecommunications company
- AMC-3, a communications satellite launched 1997
- AMC-18, a communications satellite launched 2006

=== Other uses in science and technology ===
- 7-Amino-4-methylcoumarin, a fluorochrome
- Advanced Micro Computers, a former joint-venture of AMD and Siemens
- Artificial magnetic conductor

== Sports ==
- African Minifootball Confederation
- African Minifootball Cup
- American Mideast Conference, a NAIA athletic conference (1949–2012)
- American Midwest Conference, a NAIA athletic conference (founded 1998)
- Asian Minifootball Confederation

== Religion ==
- Ahmadiyya Muslim Community, a denomination in Islam
- American Muslim Council, a religious organization in the United States

== Other uses ==
- Alarm monitoring center
- Alaska Milk Corporation, a Philippine dairy company owned by FrieslandCampina
- Amahuaca language (ISO 639-3 code: amc)
- Andy Murray Collection, a brand of British sportswear manufacturer Castore
- Appalachian Mountain Club
