= Arab Minifootball Federation =

Arab Minifootball Federation الإتحاد العربي لكرة القدم المصغرة
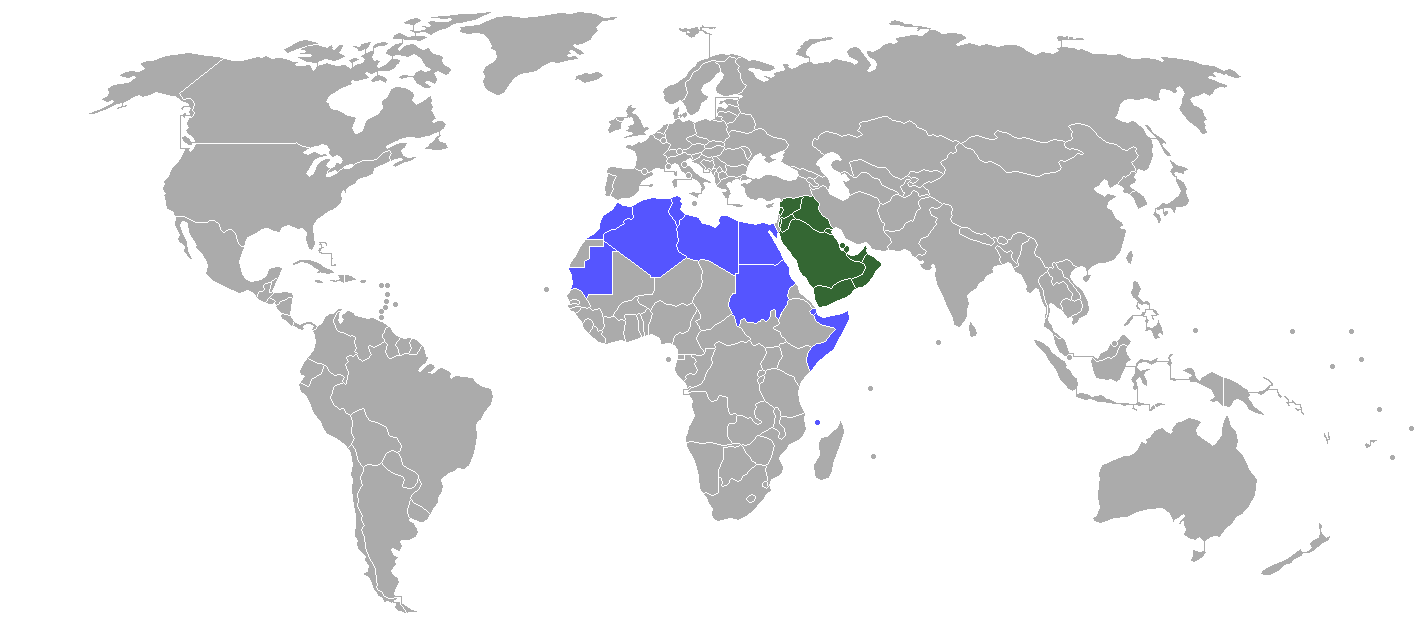
- AMFC members AMC members
- Formation: 2017
- Type: Sports organization
- Headquarters: Dubai, Emirates
- Members: 22 members: Algeria; Bahrain; Comoros; Djibouti; Egypt; Iraq; Jordan; Kuwait; Lebanon; Libya; Mauritania; Morocco; Oman; Palestine; Qatar; Saudi Arabia; Somalia; Sudan; Syria; Tunisia; United Arab Emirates; Yemen
- Official language: Arabic, English and French
- President: (United Arab Emirates) Saeed El Ajil

Arab Minifootball Federation (AMF); (Arabic: الإتحاد العربي لكرة القدم المصغرة; French: Fédération de minifootball arabe) is a governing body that supervises Arab federations under World Minifootball Federation.

The organization consists of 22 Arab countries, all of which are official members of the Arab League.

== History ==
Arab Minifootball Federation (AMF) was established in 2017 in Beirut, Lebanon.

On May 20, 2017, a constituent general assembly was held in presence of delegations from five countries: Lebanon, Tunisia, Libya, Iraq and Somalia.

Lebanese Ahmed Dench was chosen as the president of Arab Minifootball Federation (AMF),Achraf Ben Salha honor president, Libyan Hassan Talib as the deputy president, and granted membership of Lebanese Mahmoud Al-Nador, Lebanese Bilal Yazbek, Tunisian Moez bin Salem and Somali Abadi Ahmed.

In 2020, the headquarters of Arab Minifootball Federation (AMF) were moved to Cairo, Egypt. An Egyptian Ahmed Samir Suleiman was elected president of the association. On 23 Mai 2025 the new Election in Baku during WMF WC Saeed El Ajil from UAE elected new president and Achraf Ben Salha from Tunisia representative WMF,World Minifootbll fédération as vice President

== Presidents ==
Period	Name
2017–2021	(Lebanon) Ahmed Dench
2021–2024	(Egypt) Ahmed Samir Souliman
2025	United Arab Emirates Saeed El Ajil

== Competitions ==
Competition	Year	Champions	Next edition
National teams (Men's)
WMF Arab Minifootball Cup			2026 (United Arab Emirates)
IMF Arab Minifootball Cup	2024	Egypt	
Club teams (Men's)
Arab Minifootball Champions League			2026 (Libya) Zliten

On December 25, 2019, the Egyptian Ministry of Youth and Sports issued a decision to organize first Arab Nation Minifootball Cup in 2020.

Arab Minifootball Federation has set the date for February 28, 2020, and Olympic Center Minifootball Stadium in Cairo to host the tournament.

The first group consisted of Egypt, Algeria, Somalia and Lebanon, while second group consisted of Tunisia, Djibouti, Saudi Arabia and Iraq. The sphinx was also chosen to be mascot of the tournament.

However, the start has been postponed to another date due to COVID-19 pandemic.

== International competitions participation ==
Legend

- — African Minifootball Confederation teams
- — Asian Minifootball Federation teams
- 1st — Champions
- 2nd — Runners-up
- 3rd — Third place
- 4th — Fourth place
- QF — Quarterfinals (knockout round of 8)
- R2 — Round 2 (knockout round of 16)
- R1 — Round 1 (first group stage)
- Q — Qualified for upcoming tournament
- •• — Qualified but withdrew
- • — Did not qualify
- × — Did not enter / Withdrew / Banned / Entry not accepted by WMF
- — Hosts
- — Not affiliated to WMF

=== WMF World Cup ===
Team	2015 (United States) (12)	2017 (Tunisia) (24)	2019 (Australia) (32)	2021 (Ukraine) (32)	Total
Egypt				Q	0
Iraq		R1; 20th	R1; 18th		2
Saudi Arabia			R2; 16th		1
Libya		R2; 14th	••	Q	1
Lebanon		R1; 19th	R1; 17th		2
Somalia		R1; 22nd	R1; 29th	•	2
Tunisia		QF; 5th	R2; 15th	•	2
Total	0	5	5	0	10

=== WMF Continental Cup ===
Team	2019 (Tunisia) (8)	2021 (Australia) (8)	Total
Egypt		Q	0
Iraq	R1; 8th		1
Tunisia	2nd	•	1
Total	2	0	2

=== WMF World Cup U-23 ===
Team	2018 (Czech Republic) (16)	2021 (Ukraine) (8)	Total
Egypt		4th	1
Iraq	R1; 16th	-	1
Tunisia	R1; 9th	-	1
Total	2	1	2

=== WMF Women’s World Cup ===
Teams	(Ukraine) 2021(8)	Years
Egypt	4th	1
Total	1	

=== African Minifootball Cup ===
Team	2018 (Libya) (8)	2021 (Nigeria) (9)	Total
Egypt		1st	1
Libya	4th	2nd	2
Tunisia	3rd	••	1
Somalia	R1; 7th	R1; 9th	2
Total	3	3	6

=== Arab Minifootball Cup ===
Team	2024 (Egypt) (4)	Total
Egypt	1st	1
Libya	2nd	1
Tunisia	3rd	1
Lebanon	4th	1
Total	4	

== Club competitions participation ==
=== Arab Minifootball Champions League ===
Team	2024 (Libya)	Total
(Egypt) MS Mit Ghrab	Q	1
(Iraq) Jalawla CS	Q	1
(Lebanon) LWIS SC	Q	1
(Libya) Al-Khetaf Club	Q	1
(Libya) CA Zliten	Q	1
(Oman) Nojom Club	Q	1
(Tunisia) CKMF	Q	1
Total	7	7

== See also ==
World Minifootball Federation
