= Tunisia national minifootball team =

Men's national association football team representing Tunisia

Tunisia
- Nickname(s): نسور قرطاج (Eagles of Carthage)
- Association: TMF
- Other affiliation: ARMF (Arab world)
- Confederation: AMC (Africa)
- Head coach: Riadh Ben Hamdia
First colours	Second colours

First international
- Tunisia 3–3 Spain (Tunis, Tunisia; 2 May 2016)

Biggest win
- Tunisia 18–0 South Africa (Tripoli, Libya; 10 May 2018)

Biggest defeat
- Tunisia 0–7 Mexico (Nabeul, Tunisia; 13 October 2017); Tunisia 0–7 Mexico (Perth, Australia; 8 October 2019)

WMF World Cup
- Appearances: 2 (first in 2017)
- Best result: Quarter-finals (2017)

African Minifootball Cup
- Appearances: 1 (first in 2018)
- Best result: Third place (2018)

WMF Continental Cup
- Appearances: 1 (first in 2019)
- Best result: Runner-up (2019)
Medal record
Men's Football
WMF Continental Cup
Silver medal – second place	2019 Tunisia	Team
African Minifootball Cup
Bronze medal – third place	2018 Libya	Team
Arab Minifootball Cup
Bronze medal – third place	2024 Egypt	Team

The Tunisia national minifootball team represents Tunisia in men's international Minifootball competitions and it is controlled by the Tunisian Minifootball Federation (FTMF), which governs minifootball in Tunisia. On the continental level, the team competes under the African Minifootball Confederation (AMC), which governs associate football in Africa, and is also affiliated with World Minifootball Federation (WMF) for global competitions. The team is colloquially known as Eagles of Carthage by fans and the media, with the bald eagle serving as its symbol. Their home kit is primarily red and their away kit is white, which is a reference to the national flag of Tunisia. The team has qualified for the WMF World Cup two times, qualified for the African Minifootball Cup one time, competed in one edition of WMF Continental Cup where he finished in second place and one participation in the Arab Minifootball Cup.

== History ==
The minifootball activity in Tunisia started in 2016 with the establishment of the Tunisian Minifootball Federation through businessman Achraf Ben Salha, the African Minifootball Confederation founder and World Minifootball Federation vice president. Tunisia played their first match against Spain on 2 May 2016 and it ended in a 3−3 draw. At the local championship level, the first edition tool place in 2016 was contested with 12 teams. Since then, total number of clubs affiliated to the federation has risen to more than 150, in four corners of Tunisia, with different levels. Latest upgrade was introduction of video assistant referee, establishment of training sessions for minifootball coaches, and organization of the first ladies minifootball championship 2019–20 season.

In the next year, Tunisia hosted the 2017 WMF World Cup, which was played from 6 to 15 October 2017 in Nabeul with the participation of 24 teams. The team was placed in Group F alongside Libya, Lebanon and Portugal. In the opening match against Portugal, Tunisia won 3−2, another big victory against Lebanon 6−1 and a draw against Libya 2−2 to finish the group stage at the top. In the round of 16, Tunisia beat strong Kazakhstan 4−3 on penalties after a 2−2 draw. In the quarter-finals, the team suffered a heavy defeat against Mexico 0−7 and leave the tournament. At the end of the tournament, Ouday Belhaj was chosen as the best player.

In the next year, the team participate at the African Minifootball Cup for the first time in the 2018 edition in Tripoli, Libya. The team was placed in Group B alongside Nigeria, Senegal and South Africa. Tunisia drew 1−1 with Senegal in the first match, winning against Nigeria 3−1 in the second match and a resounding victory in the third match against South Africa 18−0 to finish the group stage at the top. Tunisia were eliminated from the semi-finals against Ivory Coast on penalties 6−7 after a 2−2 draw. The team get the bronze medal after defeating the host Libya in the third-place match with a score of 1−0.

In March 2019, Tunisia hosted the first edition of the WMF Continental Cup with the participation of 8 teams at the Five Stars Stadium in Tunis. The team was placed in Group A alongside England, Guatemala and Switzerland. Tunisia produced a stunning performance after beating Switzerland 5−1, a big win over Guatemala 9−0 and another win over England 3−0 to top the group and qualify for the final where they lost to world champions Czech Republic 4−5 to get the silver medal.

Thanks to the African participation, the team qualified for the 2019 WMF World Cup in Perth, Australia. The team was placed in Group F alongside Costa Rica, Japan and Slovakia. Tunisia achieved a big win against Costa Rica 8−0 and two draws against Japan 0−0 and Slovakia 1−1. In the round of 16, Mexico defeated Tunisia again with the same result as two years ago, 0−7. Since the COVID-19 pandemic that began in 2020, Tunisia has not participated in any event, especially the 2023 WMF World Cup in the United Arab Emirates, the 2021 African Minifootball Cup in Nigeria and the 2024 African Minifootball Cup in South Africa. Tunisia is set to participate in the 2025 African Minifootball Cup in Derna, Libya.

== Current staff ==
Last update: 1 August 2024

Position	Name
Head coach	(Tunisia) Riadh Ben Hamdia
Assistant coach	(Tunisia) Ali Belmadhouna
Physiotherapist	(Tunisia) Arbi Belhadj

=== Managerial history ===
- (Tunisia) Mokhtar Tlili (2016–2018)
- (Tunisia) Sofyen Brinis (2018–2020)
- (Tunisia) Mahdi Abachi (2023–2024)
- (Tunisia) Riadh Ben Hmida (2024–present)

== Competitive records ==
Champions Runners-up Third place Fourth place

- Red border color indicates tournament was held on home soil.

=== WMF World Cup ===
WMF World Cup
Year	Round	Position	Pld	W	D*	L	GF	GA
(United States) 2015	Did not enter							
(Tunisia) 2017	Quarter-finals	5th	5	3	1	1	13	14
(Australia) 2019	Round of 16	15th	4	1	2	1	9	8
(United Arab Emirates) 2023	Withdrew after qualifying (Note: Tunisia withdrew from the 2023 WMF World Cup due to the presence of Israel.)							
(Azerbaijan) 2025	Did not enter							
Total	Quarter-finals	2/4	9	4	3	2	22	22

=== WMF Continental Cup ===
WMF Continental Cup
Year	Round	Position	Pld	W	D*	L	GF	GA
(Tunisia) 2019	Runners-up	2nd	4	3	0	1	21	6
Total	Runners-up	1/1	4	3	0	1	21	6

=== African Minifootball Cup ===
African Minifootball Cup
Year	Round	Position	Pld	W	D*	L	GF	GA
(Libya) 2018	Third place	3rd	5	3	2	0	25	4
(Nigeria) 2021	Withdrew after qualifying (Note: Tunisia withdrew from the 2021 African Minifootball Cup due to the COVID-19 pandemic.)							
(South Africa) 2024	Did not enter							
(Libya) 2025	Qualified							
Total	Third place	1/4	5	3	2	0	25	4

=== Arab Minifootball Cup ===
Arab Minifootball Cup
Year	Round	Position	Pld	W	D*	L	GF	GA
(Egypt) 2024	Third place	3rd	3	0	1	2	1	3
Total	Third place	1/1	3	0	1	2	1	3

== Statistics ==
=== Results in major competitions ===
Part	Year	Stage	Date	Opponent	Result	Venue
WMF World Cup
1	(Tunisia) 2017	Group stage	6 October 2017	Portugal	3–2	Nabeul Minifoot Stadium, Nabeul
1	(Tunisia) 2017	Group stage	9 October 2017	Lebanon	6–1	Nabeul Minifoot Stadium, Nabeul
1	(Tunisia) 2017	Group stage	11 October 2017	Libya	2–2	Nabeul Minifoot Stadium, Nabeul
1	(Tunisia) 2017	Round of 16	12 October 2017	Kazakhstan	2–2 (4–3 p)	Nabeul Minifoot Stadium, Nabeul
1	(Tunisia) 2017	Quarter-finals	13 October 2017	Mexico	0–7	Nabeul Minifoot Stadium, Nabeul
2	(Australia) 2019	Group stage	2 October 2019	Costa Rica	8–0	Perth Minifoot Stadium, Perth
2	(Australia) 2019	Group stage	4 October 2019	Japan	0–0	Perth Minifoot Stadium, Perth
2	(Australia) 2019	Group stage	6 October 2019	Slovakia	1–1	Perth Minifoot Stadium, Perth
2	(Australia) 2019	Round of 16	8 October 2019	Mexico	0–7	Perth Minifoot Stadium, Perth
WMF Continental Cup
1	(Tunisia) 2019	Group stage	14 March 2019	Switzerland	5–1	Five Stars Stadium, Tunis
1	(Tunisia) 2019	Group stage	15 March 2019	Guatemala	9–0	Five Stars Stadium, Tunis
1	(Tunisia) 2019	Group stage	15 March 2019	England	3–0	Five Stars Stadium, Tunis
1	(Tunisia) 2019	Final	16 March 2019	Czech Republic	4–5	Five Stars Stadium, Tunis
African Minifootball Cup
1	(Libya) 2018	Group stage	6 May 2018	Senegal	1–1	Al-Madina Stadium, Tripoli
1	(Libya) 2018	Group stage	8 May 2018	Nigeria	3–1	Al-Madina Stadium, Tripoli
1	(Libya) 2018	Group stage	10 May 2018	South Africa	18–0	Al-Madina Stadium, Tripoli
1	(Libya) 2018	Semi-finals	11 May 2018	Ivory Coast	2–2 (6–7 p)	Al-Madina Stadium, Tripoli
1	(Libya) 2018	Third place match	12 May 2018	Libya	1–0	Al-Madina Stadium, Tripoli
Arab Minifootball Cup
1	(Egypt) 2024	Third place match	24 February 2024	Libya	0–1	Egyptian Association Stadium, Cairo
1	(Egypt) 2024	Third place match	25 February 2024	Egypt	0–1	Egyptian Association Stadium, Cairo
1	(Egypt) 2024	Third place match	27 February 2024	Lebanon	1–1	Egyptian Association Stadium, Cairo

== Honours and awards ==
=== Honours ===
- WMF Continental Cup

(silver) Runner-up: 2019

- African Minifootball Cup

(bronze) Third-place: 2018

- Arab Minifootball Cup

(bronze) Third-place: 2024

=== Awards ===
- WMF World Cup Best player

Ouday Belhaj (2017)

== See also ==
- Tunisian Minifootball Federation
- Tunisia national under-23 minifootball team
