= Tunisian Minifootball Federation =

WMF
- Founded: 2016
- Location: El Menzah, Tunis, Tunisia
- WMF affiliation: 2016
- AMC affiliation: 2016
- AMFC affiliation: 2017
- President: Mohamed Ben Abdellah

Tunisian MiniFootball Federation (Arabic: الجامعة التونسية لكرة القدم المصغرة) is the governing body of minifootball in Tunisia. It was established in 2016. It became a member of the WMF in 2016, and joined AMF association the same year. It organises Tunisia Super League Elite, controls Tunisia national minifootball team and Tunisia women's national minifootball team.

== See also ==
- Tunisia national minifootball team
- Tunisia national under-23 minifootball team
- Tunisia women's national minifootball team
