= 2025 African Minifootball Cup =

Tournament details
- Host country: Libya
- Dates: 14–25 July
- Teams: 16 (from 1 confederation)
- Venue: 1 (in 1 host city)

Final positions
- Champions: Libya
- Runners-up: Morocco
- Third place: Mauritania
- Fourth place: Guinea

The 2025 African Minifootball Cup will be the fourth edition of the African Minifootball Cup organised by the African Minifootball Confederation (AMC). The tournament will be held in the city of Derna in Libya from 14 to 25 July 2025, With the expansion of the tournament to sixteen teams, this is the second time Libya will host the event. South Africa are the defending champions.

== Venues ==
Libya was awarded the right to host the event on 27 October 2024. All the matches will be played at the Derna International Stadium in Derna. This is the second time that Libya hosts the event after the 2018 edition.

Derna
Derna International Stadium
Capacity: 2,100

== Teams ==
=== Participating nations ===
Participating teams are revealed on 29 October 2024.

Team	Finals appearance	First appearance	Last appearance	Previous best performance
Burkina Faso	2nd	2021	2021	Quarter-finals (2021)
Cameroon	2nd	2024	2024	Group stage (2024)
Chad	2nd	2024	2024	Fourth place (2024)
DR Congo	1st	None	None	Debut
Ghana	4th	2018	2024	Fourth place (2021)
Guinea	1st	None	None	Debut
Ivory Coast	3rd	2018	2021	Champions (2018)
Libya (Host)	3rd	2018	2021	Runners-up (2021)
Mauritania	2nd	2024	2024	Runners-up (2024)
Morocco	1st	None	None	Debut
Nigeria	3rd	2018	2021	Quarter-finals (2021)
Somalia	3rd	2018	2021	Group stage (2018, 2021)
South Africa (Holders)	3rd	2018	2024	Champions (2024)
Tunisia	2nd	2018	2018	Third place (2018)
Uganda	1st	None	None	Debut
Zambia	3rd	2021	2024	Quarter-finals (2021)

=== Draw ===
The teams participating in the 2025 African Minifootball Cup were divided into 4 levels according to the WMF ranking and the teams’ results in the previous three participations in the tournament. The draw took place in the city of Derna, Libya on 15 December 2024, in the presence of all the presidents of the participating federations. Algeria withdraw the tournament, it was replaced by Guinea.

Pot 1	Pot 2	Pot 3	Pot 4
Libya (Hosts); South Africa (Holders); Mauritania; Ghana	Tunisia; Chad; Ivory Coast; Nigeria	Burkina Faso; ~~Somalia~~ → Benin (Debut); Cameroon; Zambia	~~Algeria~~ → Guinea (Debut); Morocco (Debut); Uganda (Debut); DR Congo (Debut)

== Group stage ==
=== Group A ===
Pos	Team	Pld	W	D	L	GF	GA	GD	Pts	Qualification
1	Libya (H)	3	3	0	0	17	0	+17	9	Advance to knockout stage
2	Chad	3	1	0	2	3	6	−3	3	Advance to knockout stage
3	Senegal	3	1	0	2	2	9	−7	3	
4	DR Congo	3	1	0	2	2	9	−7	3	

First match(es) will be played: 14 July 2025. Source: AMC
Rules for classification: Group stage tiebreakers
(H) Hosts
14 July 2025
16:30

Senegal	1–0	DR Congo

Derna International Stadium, Derna
14 July 2025
21:30

Libya	3–0	Chad

Derna International Stadium, Derna

16 July 2025
16:30

DR Congo	2–1	Chad

Derna International Stadium, Derna
16 July 2025
18:00

Libya	7–0	Senegal

Derna International Stadium, Derna

18 July 2025
16:30

Senegal	1–2	Chad

Derna International Stadium, Derna
18 July 2025
18:00

Libya	7–0	DR Congo

Derna International Stadium, Derna

=== Group B ===
Pos	Team	Pld	W	D	L	GF	GA	GD	Pts	Qualification
1	Morocco	3	3	0	0	16	2	+14	9	Advance to knockout stage
2	Ghana	3	2	0	1	4	2	+2	6	Advance to knockout stage
3	Benin	3	1	0	2	3	5	−2	3	
4	Cameroon	3	0	0	3	1	15	−14	0	

First match(es) will be played: 15 July 2025. Source: AMC
Rules for classification: Group stage tiebreakers
15 July 2025
16:30

Ghana	3–0	Cameroon

Derna International Stadium, Derna
15 July 2025
18:00

Benin	1–4	Morocco

Derna International Stadium, Derna

16 July 2025
16:30

Cameroon	1–10	Morocco

Derna International Stadium, Derna
16 July 2025
18:00

Ghana	1–0	Benin

Derna International Stadium, Derna

18 July 2025
16:30

Cameroon	0–2	Benin

Derna International Stadium, Derna
18 July 2025
18:00

Morocco	2–0	Ghana

Derna International Stadium, Derna

=== Group C ===
Pos	Team	Pld	W	D	L	GF	GA	GD	Pts	Qualification
1	Ivory Coast	4	3	0	1	22	1	+21	9	Advance to knockout stage
2	Tanzania	3	2	0	1	12	5	+7	6	Advance to knockout stage
3	South Africa	2	1	0	1	9	21	−12	3	
4	Uganda	3	0	0	3	7	23	−16	0	

First match(es) will be played: 14 July 2025. Source: AMC
Rules for classification: Group stage tiebreakers
15 July 2025
18:00

South Africa	1–10	Ivory Coast

Derna International Stadium, Derna
15 July 2025
19:30

Tanzania	6–2	Uganda

Derna International Stadium, Derna

17 July 2025
19:30

South Africa	7–5	Uganda

Derna International Stadium, Derna
17 July 2025
21:30

Ivory Coast	2–0	Tanzania

Derna International Stadium, Derna

19 July 2025
19:30

South Africa	1–6	Tanzania

Derna International Stadium, Derna
19 July 2025
21:30

Ivory Coast	10–0	Uganda

Derna International Stadium, Derna

=== Group D ===
Pos	Team	Pld	W	D	L	GF	GA	GD	Pts	Qualification
1	Mauritania	3	3	0	0	14	3	+11	9	Advance to knockout stage
2	Guinea	3	2	0	1	10	4	+6	6	Advance to knockout stage
3	Burkina Faso	3	1	0	2	6	10	−4	3	
4	Nigeria	3	0	0	3	3	16	−13	0	

First match(es) will be played: 15 July 2025. Source: AMC
Rules for classification: Group stage tiebreakers
15 July 2025
19:30

Mauritania	9–0	Nigeria

Derna International Stadium, Derna
15 July 2025
21:30

Burkina Faso	1–5	Guinea

Derna International Stadium, Derna

17 July 2025
19:30

Nigeria	1–4	Guinea

Derna International Stadium, Derna
17 July 2025
21:30

Mauritania	3–2	Burkina Faso

Derna International Stadium, Derna

19 July 2025
19:30

Nigeria	2–3	Burkina Faso

Derna International Stadium, Derna
19 July 2025
21:30

Guinea	1–2	Mauritania

Derna International Stadium, Derna

== Knockout stage ==
=== Bracket ===
Quarter-finals
2025 – Derna
Libya	2
Ghana	1
2025 – Derna
Ivory Coast	0
Guinea	1
2025 – Derna
Morocco	3
Chad	0
2025 – Derna
Mauritania	4
Tanzania	0

Semi-finals
2025 – Derna
Libya	2
Guinea	0
2025 – Derna
Morocco	4
Mauritania	3

Final
2025 – Derna
Libya
Morocco
Third place
2025 – Derna
Guinea	2
Mauritania	3

=== Quarter-finals ===
21 Juli 2025

Libya	2–1	Ghana

Derna International Stadium, Derna

21 Juli 2025

Morocco	3–0	Chad

Derna International Stadium, Derna

22 Juli 2025

Ivory Coast	0–1	Guinea

Derna International Stadium, Derna

22 Juli 2025

Mauritania	4–0	Tanzania

Derna International Stadium, Derna

=== Semi-finals ===
2025

Libya	2-0	Guinea

Derna International Stadium, Derna

2025

Morocco	4–3	Mauritania

Derna International Stadium, Derna

=== Third place match ===
2025

Guinea	2–3	Mauritania

Derna International Stadium, Derna

=== Final ===
25 July 2025

Morocco	0-0	Libya
Penalties
	2–3

Derna International Stadium, Derna

== World Cup qualification stage ==
5th–8th place
24 July
Ivory Coast	5
Ghana	2
24 July
Chad	1
Benin	0

Fifth place
? July
Ivory Coast
Chad

^2 Match between Chad and Mauritius not counted, after AMF declared Chad winners of the match against Cameroon in the group stage. Chad qualified to a knockout stage and Mauritius qualified to the fifth match place.

=== 5th–8th place matches ===
24 July 2025

Ivory Coast	5–2	Ghana

24 July 2025

Chad	1–0	Benin

=== Fifth place match ===
? July 2025

Ivory Coast	v	Chad

== Qualified teams for the 2027 WMF World Cup ==
The following four teams from CAF qualified for the 2027 WMF World Cup.

Team	Qualified on	Previous appearances at the WMF World Cup
Libya	21 July 2025	2 (2017, 2023)
Morocco	21 July 2025	0 (debut)
Guinea	22 July 2025	0 (debut)
Mauritania	22 July 2025	1 (2025)
Ivory Coast	25 July 2025	1 (2017)
