= AMFC =

AMFC may refer to:

- Asian Minifootball Confederation
- Asian Mini Football Championship
