= Asian Mini Football Championship =

Continental indoor minifootball competition

- Organiser(s): ANMC
- Founded: 2023
- Region: Asia
- Teams: 10
- Current champions: Thailand
- Most championships: Thailand; Iran
- Asian Mini Football Championship 2026

The Asian Minifootball Championship is a continental minifootball competition for national teams in Asia. The competition is organised under the Asian Minifootball Confederation (ANMC), which describes itself as the governing body for minifootball in Asia and an affiliate of the World Minifootball Federation (WMF).

== Competition ==
The Asian Mini Football Championship is a continental outdoor minifootball (6v6 Football - 50 Minutes) competition contested by the senior men's national teams of Asian Minifootball Confederation (ANMC). Two teams play 6 against 6 with a reserve of 9 players. 25 Min + 10 Min + 25 Min / 2*5 Over time / 3v3 Penalty kicks

== History ==
The competition has been referred to by different names in official and contemporary sources. The ANMC officially promoted the 2025 edition as the Asian Minifootball Nations Cup 2025, while contemporary reports referred to it as the 2025 Asian Mini Football Championship. The 2026 edition was officially promoted as the Asian Minifootball Championship.

=== Editions (ANMC / WMF) ===
Year	Host	Champions	Runners-up	Third place	Teams
2025	Sharjah, United Arab Emirates	Iran	Indonesia	United Arab Emirates	8
2026	Jakarta, Indonesia	Thailand	Uzbekistan	United Arab Emirates	10

== 2025 ==
The 2025 competition was held in Sharjah, United Arab Emirates, from 4 to 9 March 2025. The Asian Minifootball Confederation (ANMC) listed eight participating national teams: India, Pakistan, Japan, Iraq, Indonesia, Iran, the United Arab Emirates, and Oman.

Iran defeated Indonesia 3–2 in the final. The United Arab Emirates defeated Oman 4–1 in a penalty shootout in the third-place play-off.

=== Final standings ===
Pos.	Team
1	Iran
2	Indonesia
3	United Arab Emirates
4	Oman
5	Pakistan
6	Japan
7	Iraq
8	India

=== Group A ===
Pos	Team	Pld	W	D	L	GF	GA	GD	Pts
1	United Arab Emirates	3	3	0	0	10	1	+9	9
2	Indonesia	3	2	0	1	13	3	+10	6
3	Pakistan	3	1	0	2	7	10	−3	3
4	India	3	0	0	3	1	17	−16	0

==== Group A results ====
Date	Team	Score	Team
4 March 2025	United Arab Emirates	7–0	India
4 March 2025	Indonesia	7–2	Pakistan
5 March 2025	Pakistan	4–1	India
5 March 2025	United Arab Emirates	1–0	Indonesia
6 March 2025	United Arab Emirates	2–1	Pakistan
6 March 2025	Indonesia	6–0	India

=== Group B ===
Pos	Team	Pld	W	D	L	GF	GA	GD	Pts
1	Oman	3	2	1	0	8	4	+4	7
2	Iran	3	2	1	0	4	1	+3	7
3	Japan	3	1	0	2	3	7	−4	3
4	Iraq	3	0	0	3	1	4	−3	0

==== Group B results ====
Date	Team	Score	Team
4 March 2025	Japan	1–0	Iraq
4 March 2025	Iran	1–1	Oman
5 March 2025	Iraq	1–2	Oman
5 March 2025	Iran	2–0	Japan
6 March 2025	Oman	5–2	Japan
6 March 2025	Iran	1–0	Iraq

=== Ranking matches ===
Date	Placement	Team	Score	Team
9 March 2025	7th–8th place	Iraq	9–0	India
9 March 2025	5th–6th place	Pakistan	3–0	Japan

The results of the earlier placement matches between Japan and India and between Pakistan and Iraq are recorded in archived versions of the tournament article, but have not been included here as independently sourced results pending verification.

=== Semi-finals ===
Date	Team	Score	Team
9 March 2025	Iran	1–0	United Arab Emirates
9 March 2025	Indonesia	3–2	Oman

=== Third place ===
Date	Team	Score	Team
9 March 2025	United Arab Emirates	4–1 (pen.)	Oman

=== Final ===
Date	Team	Score	Team
9 March 2025	Iran	3–2	Indonesia

=== Final ranking ===
Pos.	Team
1	Iran
2	Indonesia
3	United Arab Emirates
4	Oman
5	Pakistan
6	Japan
7	Iraq
8	India

== 2026 ==
The second edition of the Asian Minifootball Championship under the AMC/WMF competition structure was held in Jakarta, Indonesia, from 13 to 18 September 2026. Ten national teams participated, divided into two groups of five. The group stage was played at ASIOP Stadium, with ranking matches, the semi-finals, the third-place match and the final following the group stage.

== 2026 group stage ==
=== Group A ===
Pos	Team	Pld	W	D	L	GF	GA	GD	Pts
1	Thailand	4	4	0	0	35	0	+35	12
2	Indonesia	4	3	0	1	18	2	+16	9
3	Iraq	4	2	0	2	38	11	+27	6
4	India	4	1	0	3	11	37	−26	3
5	Bangladesh	4	0	0	4	7	59	−52	0

Source: official tournament results.

=== Group A Results ===
Date	Team	Score	Team
13 September 2026	Thailand	15–0	India
13 September 2026	Indonesia	8–1	Bangladesh
14 September 2026	Thailand	14–0	Bangladesh
14 September 2026	Indonesia	5–0	Iraq (walkover)
15 September 2026	India	8–5	Bangladesh
15 September 2026	Thailand	5–0	Iraq (walkover)
15 September 2026	Bangladesh	1–14	Iraq
15 September 2026	India	0–9	Indonesia
16 September 2026	Iraq	23–3	India
16 September 2026	Thailand	1–0	Indonesia

=== Group B ===
Pos	Team	Pld	W	D	L	GF	GA	GD	Pts
1	Uzbekistan	4	3	0	1	15	7	+8	9
2	(United Arab Emirates) UAE	4	3	0	1	21	9	+12	9
3	Syria	4	2	0	2	18	9	+9	6
4	Pakistan	4	1	0	3	6	17	−11	3
5	Japan	4	1	0	3	5	22	−17	3

=== Group B Results ===
Date	Team	Score	Team
13 September 2026	Uzbekistan	5–2	Japan
13 September 2026	(United Arab Emirates) UAE	2–5	Syria
14 September 2026	Uzbekistan	5–0	Syria
14 September 2026	(United Arab Emirates) UAE	4–1	Pakistan
15 September 2026	Japan	0–5	Syria
15 September 2026	Uzbekistan	3–1	Pakistan
15 September 2026	Syria	8–1	Pakistan
15 September 2026	Japan	1–13	(United Arab Emirates) UAE
16 September 2026	Pakistan	3–2	Japan
16 September 2026	Uzbekistan	2–4	(United Arab Emirates) UAE

The official tournament report notes that the Uzbekistan–Syria result was recorded as 5–0 following a disciplinary decision.

=== Ranking Matches ===
Placement	Team	Score	Team
9th place	Bangladesh	1–4	Japan
7th place	India	0–5	Pakistan (walkover)
5th place	Iraq	8–1	Syria

=== Semi Finals ===
Date	Team	Score	Team
17 September 2026	Uzbekistan	2–0	Indonesia
17 September 2026	Thailand	3–0	(United Arab Emirates) UAE

=== Third Place ===
Date	Team	Score	Team
18 September 2026	United Arab Emirates	3–0	Indonesia

=== Finals ===
Date	Team	Score	Team
18 September 2026	Thailand	3–2	Uzbekistan

=== Final Standings ===
Pos	Team
1	Thailand
2	Uzbekistan
3	United Arab Emirates
4	Indonesia
5	Iraq
6	Syria
7	Pakistan
8	India
9	Japan
10	Bangladesh

Thailand won the championship for the second time, having previously won the inaugural edition in 2023. Uzbekistan finished second and the United Arab Emirates third.

== 2026 tournament statistics ==
=== 2026 statistical table ===
The following statistics are calculated from the 27 official tournament results published by the Asian Minifootball Confederation. Recorded walkovers are included as official 5–0 results, as shown in the official results record.

Pos	Team	MP	W	L	GF	GA	GD	Pts
1	Thailand	6	6	0	41	2	+39	18
2	Uzbekistan	6	4	2	19	10	+9	12
3	United Arab Emirates	6	4	2	26	12	+14	12
4	Indonesia	6	3	3	22	7	+15	9
5	Iraq	5	3	2	45	15	+30	9
6	Syria	5	3	2	19	16	+3	9
7	Pakistan	5	2	3	11	17	−6	6
8	India	5	1	4	11	57	−46	3
9	Japan	5	1	4	9	27	−18	3
10	Bangladesh	5	0	5	8	48	−40	0

Note: The final position column follows the official tournament finishing order. The statistical totals above are calculated from the published 27 official results and therefore are not intended to replace the competition's published group-ranking criteria.

=== Individual statistics ===
Hussein Abdulhadi of Iraq was reported as the tournament's leading goalscorer with 10 goals. India's Anish Murali was reported as the second-highest scorer with eight goals.

Abdulhadi scored six goals in Iraq's 23–3 victory over India, the highest-scoring match of the tournament.

=== Tournament records ===
Record	Statistic
Most goals by a team in a match	Iraq, 23
Highest-scoring match	Iraq 23–3 India
Goals in highest-scoring match	26
Largest winning margin	Iraq by 20 goals
Most goals by a player in one match	Hussein Abdulhadi, 6
Most goals scored by a team during the tournament	Iraq, 45
Fewest goals conceded	Thailand, 2
Best goal difference	Thailand, +39
Most wins	Thailand, 6

=== Thailand's championship campaign ===
Thailand won all six of its matches at the tournament.

In the group stage, Thailand defeated India 15–0, Bangladesh 14–0, Iraq 5–0 by walkover and Indonesia 1–0. Thailand subsequently defeated the United Arab Emirates 3–0 in the semi-final and Uzbekistan 3–2 in the final.

Thailand scored 41 goals and conceded two during the tournament. Both goals conceded came in the final against Uzbekistan.

=== Individual awards ===
The reported individual awards included Treerapong Seree of Thailand as Best Player, Hussein Abdulhadi as top scorer, and M. Nazil of Indonesia as Best Goalkeeper. Japan received the Fair Play award.

== Participating nations ==
The 2025 edition featured eight national teams: India, Pakistan, Japan, Iraq, Indonesia, Iran, the United Arab Emirates, and Oman.

The 2026 edition featured ten national teams. Thailand won the championship, with Uzbekistan finishing second and the United Arab Emirates third.

Team	2025	2026	Appearances
India	8th	8th	2
Indonesia	2nd	4th	2
Iran	1st	—	1
Iraq	7th	5th	2
Japan	6th	9th	2
Oman	4th	—	1
Pakistan	5th	7th	2
Syria	—	6th	1
Thailand	—	1st	1
United Arab Emirates	3rd	3rd	2
Uzbekistan	—	2nd	1
Bangladesh	—	10th	1

Across the two documented editions, 12 national teams have participated in the competition.

=== Medal table ===
Nation	Gold	Silver	Bronze	Total
Thailand	1	0	0	1
Iran	1	0	0	1
Indonesia	0	1	0	1
Uzbekistan	0	1	0	1
United Arab Emirates	0	0	2	2

== See also ==
- Minifootball Five International Federation (MFIF) 5v5 Football Since 2019
- International Street Football Association (ISFA) 3v3 Football Since 2025
- International Socca Federation (ISF) 7v7 Football Since 2017
- Phygital sport - Games of the Future - Phygital Football
- Minifootball
- Five-a-side football
- Seven-a-side football
- Ghetto Games Since 2019
- F7 Internanional Cup (Since 2022)
- FIF 7 Since 2011
- Kings League
- Queens League
- 2025 Kings World Cup Nations
- World Sevens Football
- 7's Football League
- The Soccer Tournament
- National Professional Soccer League (1984–2001)
- Indoor Football League
- Powerleague
- World Minifootball Federation
