= Zimbru Stadium =

Football stadium in Chișinău, Moldova

- Stadionul Zimbru
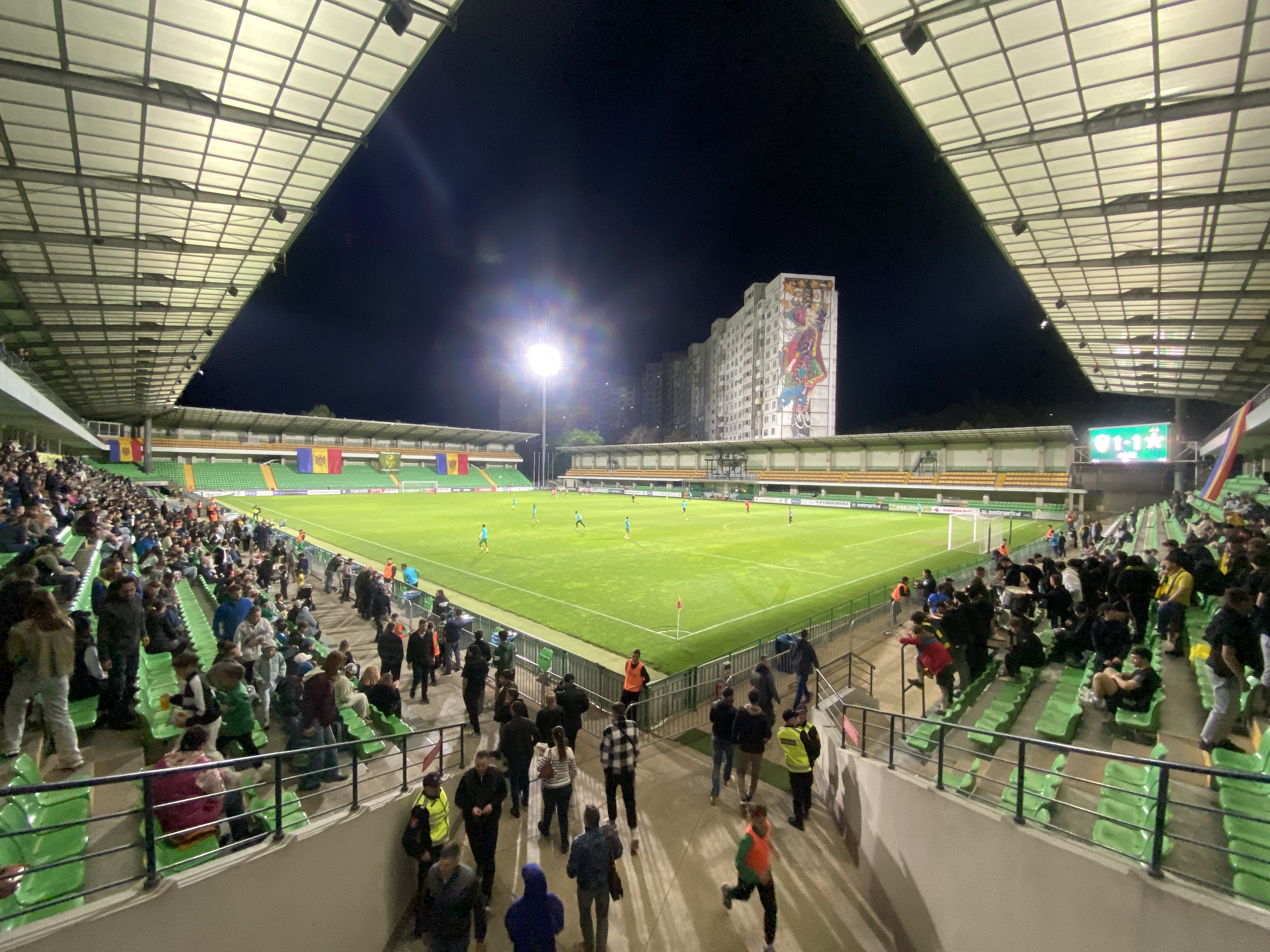
- The stadium hosting a Super Liga match in 2025; UEFA
- Interactive map of Zimbru Stadium
- Address: 45 Dacia Boulevard; Chișinău; Moldova
- Owner: Zimbru Chișinău
- Operator: Moldovan Football Federation
- Capacity: 10,104
- Surface: Natural Grass
- Scoreboard: 1,600 lux
- Field size: 111 m × 77 m (121.4 yd × 84.2 yd)

Construction
- Groundbreaking: March 2004; 22 years ago
- Opened: 20 May 2006; 20 years ago
- Cost: $11 million
- Architect: Ceproserving SA
- Structural engineer: Inconex-Com SRL

Tenants
- Zimbru Chișinău (2006–present); Moldova national football team (2006–present)

The Zimbru Stadium (Romanian: Stadionul Zimbru) is a football-specific stadium in Chișinău, Moldova, completed in May 2006 with a capacity of 10,104 people, meeting all norms required by UEFA and FIFA for national and international matches.

Starting from June 2016, the Moldovan Football Federation took over the administration of Zimbru Stadium for a period of 10 years. Through this decision, the FMF assumed responsibility towards international football structures to modernize the stadium, ensuring that it meets all the necessary conditions for organizing matches in the international football tournament preliminaries held in Chișinău.

== Construction ==
The construction of the sports complex on Dacia Boulevard began in 2004. The project for the future facility was developed by the staff of the Ceproserving Institute. The majority of the work was carried out by Inconex-Com. Other companies, including Moldovan ones, also participated in the construction that lasted for 27 months. During the construction process, numerous problems arose that were not easily resolved. However, the Zimbru Stadium was still built. Foreign specialists actively participated in the construction and development of the stadium in Chișinău. The grass field on the pitch was laid by the well-known Swiss company Matomatic. The projectors for illuminating the arena were made at the German Siteco factory, and Ukrainian specialists were involved in the production of video boards.

== Opening ==
The stadium was inaugurated on 20 May 2006, in a match between Zimbru Chișinău and Krylia Sovetov Samara, which ended in a 1–1 draw.

== Facilities ==
The VIP box is reserved for 250 people. Sports journalists have 44 places at their disposal. The arena meets all the requirements for holding official international matches.

For the sound insulation of the Zimbru Arena, it was covered with special soundproof panels produced in Slovenia along the entire perimeter.

The Zimbru sports complex includes three stadiums, a mini-football field, tennis courts, a gym, residential blocks for football players, a medical centre, an administrative block, a Young Football Player Training Center, a hotel, and a museum.

The club also has three standard-sized outdoor tennis courts intended for tennis matches. The courts are equipped with artificial covering, ensuring conditions for playing lawn tennis.

== Usage ==
The Zimbru Stadium in Chișinău is currently used mostly for football matches and is the home stadium of Zimbru Chișinău and the Moldova national football team. Other Moldovan clubs also play their home games here in European tournaments.

In September 2022 Sheriff Tiraspol played their 2022–23 UEFA Europa League, due to the UEFA decision prohibiting games in Transnistria due to Russian invasion of Ukraine.

It also hosted concerts of Scorpions, Okean Elzy.

== Zimbru-2 Stadium and CPTF Stadium ==
Zimbru-2 Stadium
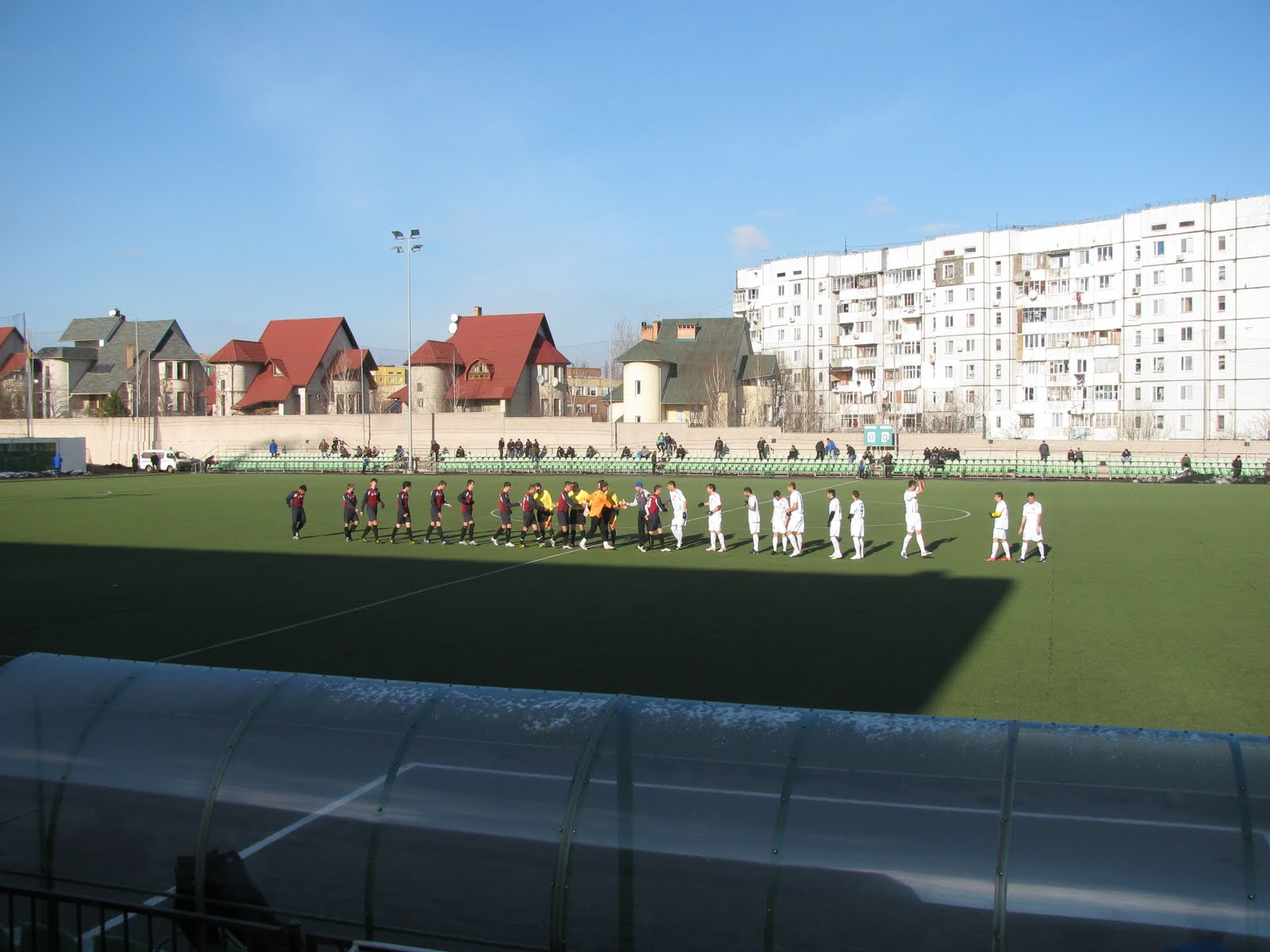
- CPTF Stadium in 2010
- Address: 1 Butucului Street; Chișinău; Moldova
- Owner: Zimbru Chișinău
- Capacity: 2,000
- Surface: Natural Grass
- Field size: 111 m × 77 m (121.4 yd × 84.2 yd)

Construction
- Opened: 2006

Tenant
- Zimbru-2 Chișinău

Zimbru-2 Stadium, with natural grass, and CPTF Stadium, with artificial grass, both situated within the Zimbru sports complex, and have a seating capacity of 2,000. Stadiums serves as the home ground for Zimbru Chișinău, Zimbru-2 Chișinău and Zimbru youth teams.
