= USAMC =

USAMC may refer to:

== Military ==
- United States Army Materiel Command, primary provider of materiel for the United States Army
- United States Army Medical Corps, specialty branch of the Army Medical Department, United States Army
- United States (of America) Marine Corps, maritime land force branch of the United States Armed Forces

== Other ==
- USA Memory Championship, an annual memory competition

== See also ==
- AMC (disambiguation)
