= African Minifootball Champions League =

- African Minifootball Champions League
- Founded: 2019
- Region: Africa (AMC)
- Teams: 8
- Current champions: (Libya) Al-Tahadi SC (2019)
- Most championships: (Libya) Al-Tahadi SC (1 title)
- 2025 AMCL

The African Minifootball Champions League (AMCL) is a continental indoor minifootball competition contested by the senior men's clubs of African Minifootball Confederation (AMC). The first edition was held in Tunisia in June 2019.

== Results ==
=== Summaries ===
Year	Host	Final			Third place match		
Year	Host	Winner	Score	Runner-up	Third place	Score	Fourth place
2019; Details	Hebira, Tunisia	(Libya); Al-Tahadi SC	3–2	(Tunisia); AS Tronja	(Algeria); MC Béjaïa	No playoffs	(Tunisia); US Hammamet
2022; Details			–			–	
2023; Details			–			–	
2025; Details	Zliten, Libya	(Libya); CA Zliten	2–3	(Mauritania); MC Barkéol		–	
2025; Details	Nouakchott, Mauritania	(Mauritania); MC Barkéol	3–4 (2–3 p)	(Libya); CA Zliten		–	
2025; Details		CA Zliten won by penalties free kick 2–3 after finishing 6–6 on aggregate.					

=== Performance by club ===
Team	Champions	Runners-up	Third-place	Fourth-place
(Libya) Al-Tahadi SC	1 (2019)	–	–	–
(Tunisia) AS Tronja	–	1 (2019)	–	–
(Algeria) MC Béjaïa	–	–	1 (2019)	–
(Tunisia) US Hammamet	–	–	–	1 (2019*)

* hosts.

== Participating clubs ==
Legend

- 1st – Champions
- 2nd – Runners-up
- 3rd – Third place
- 4th – Fourth place
- QF – Quarter finals
- GS – Group stage
- q – Qualified
- — Hosts

Team	(Tunisia) 2019	2022	Years
(Libya) Al-Tahadi SC	1st		1
(Tunisia) AS Tronja	2nd		1
(Algeria) MC Béjaïa	3rd		1
(Tunisia) US Hammamet	4th		1
(Tunisia) AS Hbira	GS		1
(South Africa) Pretoria Blues	GS		1
(Libya) Al-Jihed SC	GS		1
SDVK Djibouti	GS		1
Total	8	8	
