= Tunisia national under-23 minifootball team =

Tunisian sports team

Tunisia U-23
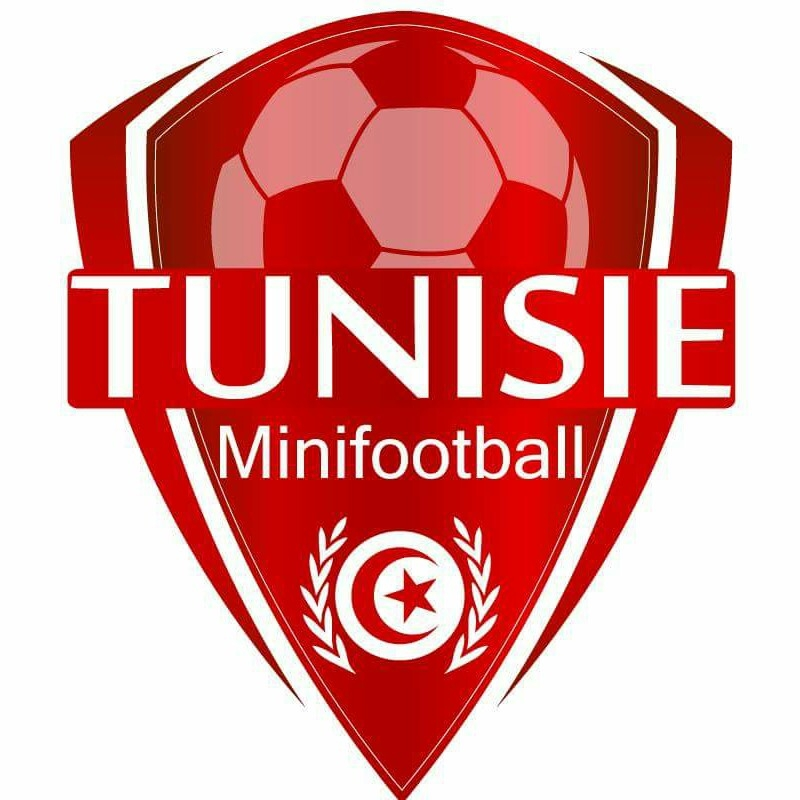
- Nickname(s): نسور قرطاج (Eagles of Carthage)
- Association: FTMF (Tunisia)
- Other affiliation: ARMF (Arab world)
- Confederation: AMF (Africa)
- Home stadium: Nabeul Minifoot Stadium
- FIFA code: TUN
First colours	Second colours

First international
- Tunisia 2 - 8 Russia (10 April 2018); Sports Hall Eleven VS, Prague, Czech Republic

Biggest win

Biggest defeat
- Tunisia 2 - 8 Russia (10 April 2018); Sports Hall Eleven VS, Prague, Czech Republic

U23 WMF World Cup
- Appearances: 1 (first in 2018)
- Best result: Group stage

The Tunisia national under-23 minifootball team (Arabic: منتخب تونس تحت 23 سنة لكرة القدم المصغّرة), nicknamed Les Aigles de Carthage (The Eagles of Carthage or The Carthage Eagles), belongs to the Tunisian Minifootball Federation. Since 2018 the team has played one time in the U23 WMF World Cup.

== Competition records ==
Champions Runners-up Third place Fourth place

- Red border color indicates tournament was held on home soil.

=== U23 WMF World Cup ===
U23 WMF World Cup record
Year	Round	Position	GP	W	D	L	GS	GA
Czech Republic 2018	GS	5th	3	0	1	2	2	9
Ukraine 2021	WO							
Total	1/2	GS	3	0	1	2	2	9

== See also ==
- Tunisia national minifootball team
- Tunisia women's national minifootball team
- Tunisian Minifootball Federation
