= Raimonds Elbakjans =

Latvian basketball player (born 1986)

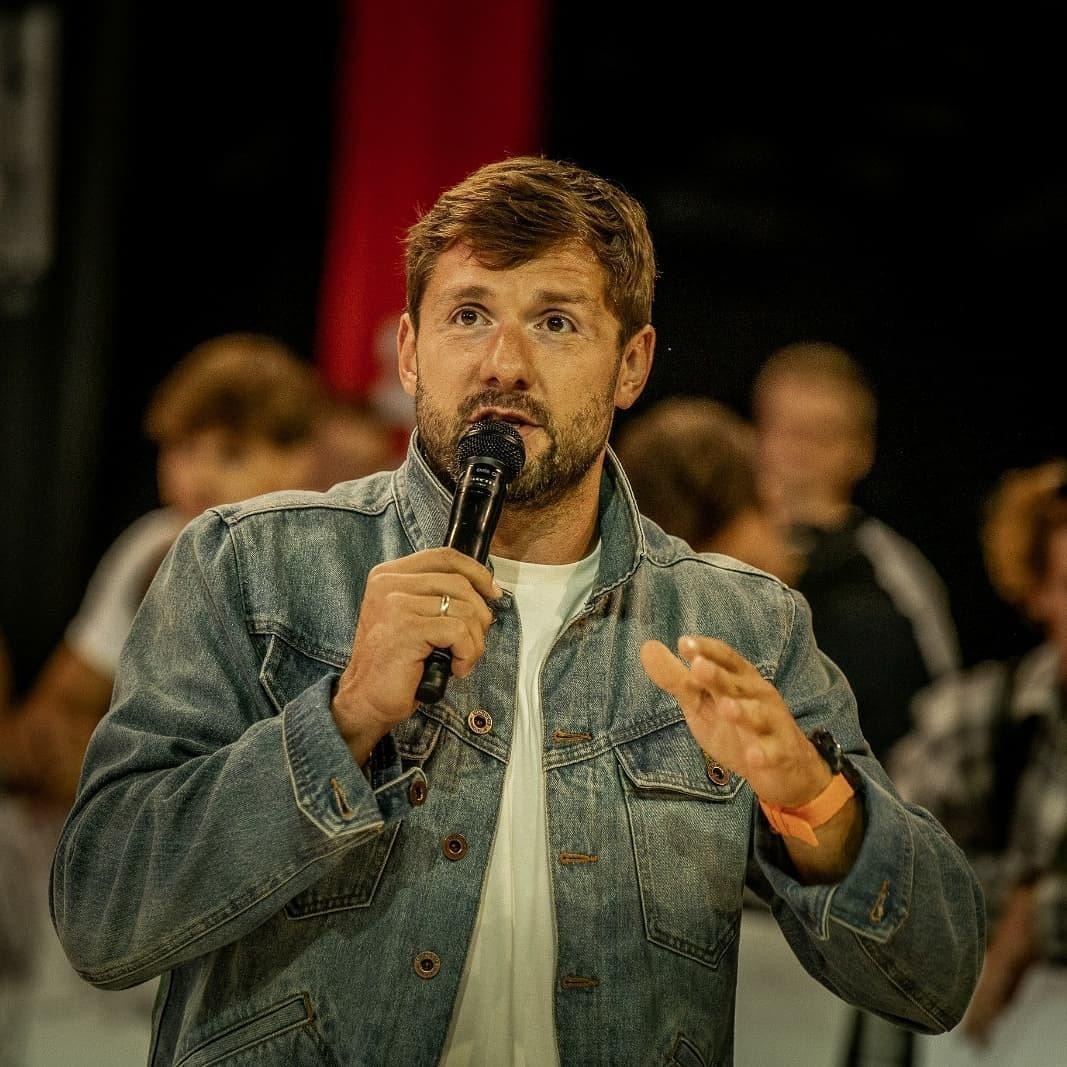

Personal information
- Born: 13 May 1986 (age 40) Riga, Latvia
- Listed height: 6.15 ft 0 in (1.87 m)

Career information
- Playing career: 2000–2006 (Youth Career: 1991 - 2000)
- Position: Guard
- Number: 13

Career history
- 1994-2002: Ridzene (basketball club)
- 2002-2003: Ventspils Basketball Club
- 2003-2005: Latvia men's national U18

Raimonds Elbakjans (born 13 May 1986) is a former Latvian basketball player who founded an international youth movement Ghetto Games. He is the leader and the main fundraiser in the non-government organization of multi-sport events Ghetto Games.

== Career ==
Raimonds Elbakjans was born on May 13, 1986, in Riga. He began to play basketball for Riga's children and youth sports school “Ridzene” from 1994 till 2002, where he played with 1984 and 1985 years born teammates. He played in the Latvian National Basketball U18 Team, then in 2005 in the youth club, in ASKA Riga. But due to his health condition he was forced to quit professional basketball.

== Ghetto Games ==
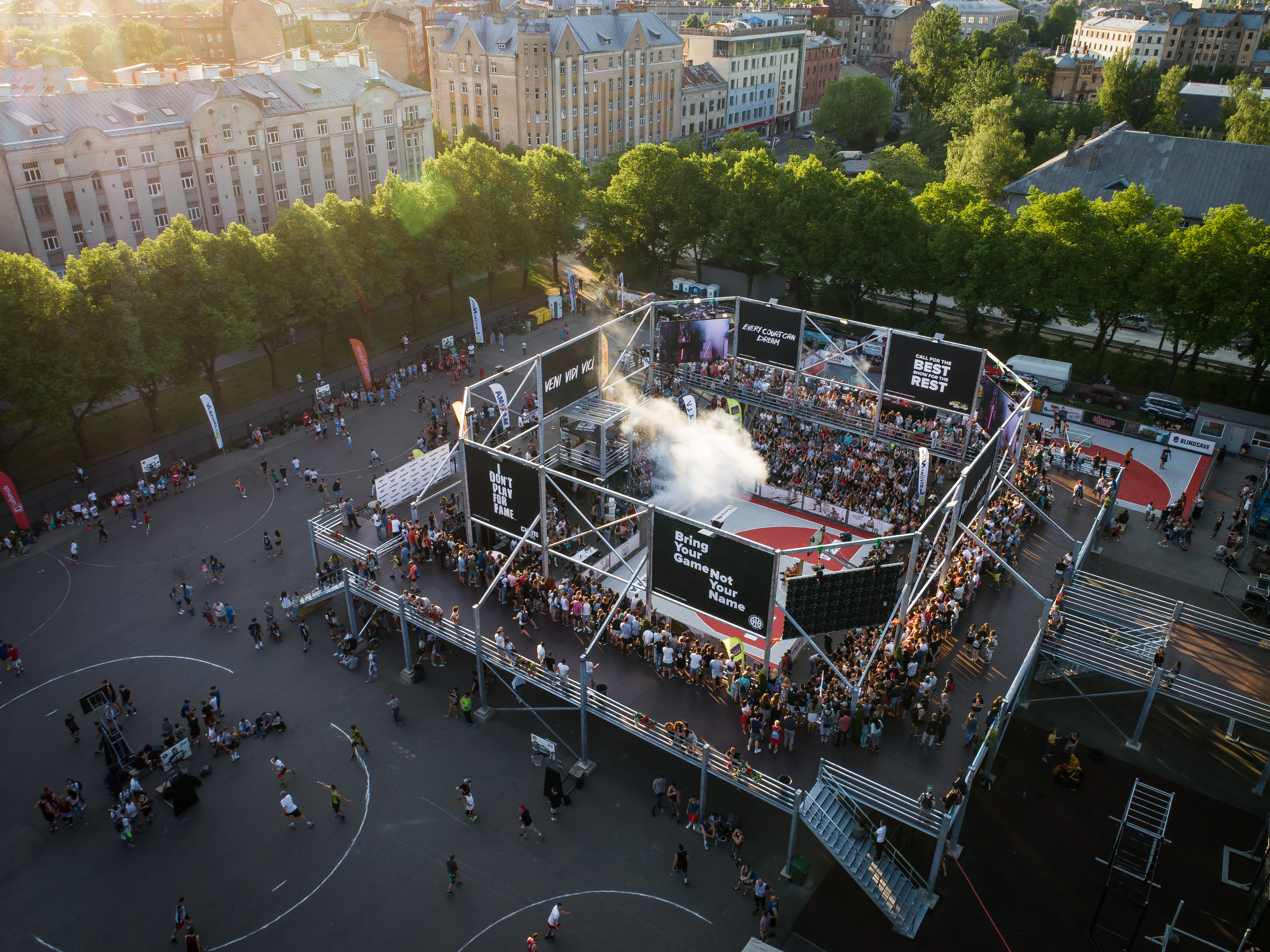
Ghetto Games slam dunk contest in Riga, Latvia (2018)

After his basketball career, he decided to create basketball tournaments for himself and his friends – Ghetto Basket. In two years, the Ghetto Basket movement turned into the Ghetto Games. Later, more active sport leaders joined the movement, to be united under one street sport family – Ghetto Games. Since then Elbakjans is the leader of multi-sport event movement Ghetto Games. Ghetto Games is a non-government organization of multi-sport events, youth street sports, and cultural movement that includes 3x3 basketball, 3x3 football, 3x3 floorball, Ghetto Fight, Street Dance - Ghetto Dance, and such extreme sports as BMX, Skateboarding, Extreme Inline, Scooters, Wakeboarding and other.

== Personal life ==
Elbakjans has two sons Robert Elbakjans and Rodrigo Elbakjans, also a daughter Adriana Elbakjana. In January 2021, Elbakjans married in Georgia to Tamara Bagdavadze.

== Honors ==
- 2016 European Commissions initiated award – #BeActive: Local Hero Award winner
- 2014 TEDxRiga 2014 winner
