= 2021 African Minifootball Cup =

Tournament details
- Host country: Nigeria
- Dates: 8–17 July 2021
- Teams: 9 (originally 16) (from 1 confederation)
- Venue: 1 (in 1 host city)

Final positions
- Champions: Egypt (1st title)
- Runners-up: Libya
- Third place: Ivory Coast
- Fourth place: Ghana

Tournament statistics
- Matches played: 28
- Goals scored: 112 (4 per match)
- Top scorer(s): (Ghana) Bernard Sarfo (7 goals)
- Best player: (Libya) Mohamed Khamies
- All statistics correct as of 18 July 2021.

The 2021 African Minifootball Cup (Arabic: 2021 كأس أمم إفريقيا لكرة القدم المصغرة, French: CAN mini-foot 2021) also called AFCON Minifoot, was the second edition of the African Minifootball Cup held by the African Minifootball Confederation (AMC). The tournament was held in Nigeria. Initially set to hold in 2020, it was postponed to 2021 due to COVID-19. It was huge success even with covid situation in Nigeria.

== Teams and draw ==
=== Qualified Teams ===
Unlike in the 2018 African Minifootball Cup, 16 teams are qualified for the final

Team	Finals appearance	Previous best performance
Ghana	2nd	Groupe stage 2018
Ivory Coast	2nd	Winner 2018
Libya	2nd	Fourth place 2018
Nigeria	2nd	Groupe stage2018
Senegal	2nd	Runner-up 2018
Somalia	2nd	Groupe stage2018
South Africa	2nd	Groupe stage2018
Tunisia	2nd	Third place2018
Morocco	1st	debut
Djibouti	1st	debut
Benin	1st	debut
Burkina Faso	1st	debut
Egypt	1st	debut
Algeria	1st	debut
Zambia	1st	debut
Gabon	1st	debut

=== Draw ===
On 10 June 2021, in Ibadan, the pools were drawn for 4 groups of 16 teams

Pot 1	Pot 2	Pot 3	Pot 4
Nigeria (Host country); Ivory Coast; Tunisia; Libya	Algeria; Benin; Morocco; Ghana	Zambia; Egypt; Burkina Faso; Djibouti	Gabon; South Africa; Somalia; Senegal

== Participating nations ==
Due to Covid-19 measurements in some participants' countries, the tournament kicked off with only 9 countries: host Nigeria, Libya, Ghana, Egypt, Burkina Faso, Zambia, Benin Republic, Somalia and Senegal. One of the most notably absent teams are the Tunisia MiniFootball, who finished third in the last tournament. For more information visit website of the tournament: MyGol platform

== Venues ==
Cities	Venues	Capacity
Oyo	Ilaji International Minifootball Stadium	

== Group stage ==
=== Group A ===
Pos	Team	Pld	W	D	L	GF	GA	GD	Pts
1	Libya	3	2	1	0	8	1	+7	7
2	Senegal	3	2	0	1	7	8	−1	6
3	Nigeria (H)	3	1	1	1	5	5	0	4
4	Zambia	3	0	0	3	4	10	−6	0

(H) Hosts

Notice : Djibouti did note enter even after that they confirmed their participation

8 July 2021
20:00 UTC+1

Nigeria	0-0	Libya
	report (Mygol) report (Press)

Ilaji International Minifootball Stadium, Oyo, Nigeria
Referee: Mohamed fares Elkaoui
- Bilal Sene

9 July 2021
20:00 UTC+1

Zambia	2-3	Senegal
	Report

Ilaji International Minifootball Stadium, Oyo, Nigeria
Referee: Mohamed fares Elkaoui
- Bilal Sene

11 July 2021
17:30 UTC+1

Nigeria	2-3	Senegal
	report (Mygol) report (Press)

Ilaji International Minifootball Stadium, Oyo, Nigeria
Referee: Mohamed fares Elkaoui
- Bilal Sene
11 July 2021
16:00 UTC+1

Senegal	1-4	Libya
KARIFA 6'	Report	MOHAMMAD ABDULLAH 13'; IBRAHIM SAID 21', 41'; MUSTAFA NIQREESH 48'

Ilaji International Minifootball Stadium, Oyo, Nigeria
Referee: Mohamed fares Elkaoui
- Bilal Sene

12 July 2021
17:30 UTC+1

Zambia	2-3	Nigeria
	report (Mygol) report (Press)

Ilaji International Minifootball Stadium, Oyo, Nigeria
Referee: Mohamed fares Elkaoui
- Bilal Sene

13 July 2021
17:30 UTC+1

Zambia	0-4	Libya
	Report	MOHAMMAD ABDULLAH 13'; ALEID ABU ZAYD 39'; OMAR MOUSAY 50'; IBRAHIM SAID 50+2'

Ilaji International Minifootball Stadium, Oyo, Nigeria
Referee: Mohamed fares Elkaoui
- Bilal Sene

=== Group B ===
Pos	Team	Pld	W	D	L	GF	GA	GD	Pts
1	Egypt	4	4	0	0	16	3	+13	12
2	Ghana	4	2	1	1	14	8	+6	7
3	Ivory Coast	4	2	0	2	9	7	+2	6
4	Burkina Faso	4	1	1	2	7	8	−1	4
5	Somalia	4	0	0	4	2	22	−20	0

8 July 2021
20:30 UTC+1

Egypt	3-1	Ghana
MOHAMED HASSAN ALI 0'; REYAD IBRAHIM 0'; ABDELNABY ABDELFATTAH 0'	report (Mygol) report (Press)	SARFO 0'

Ilaji International Minifootball Stadium, Oyo, Nigeria
Referee: Mohamed fares Elkaoui
- Bilal Sene

10 July 2021
20:00 UTC+1

Ghana	3-3	Burkina Faso
SARFO 0', 0'; APPIAH KUBI 0'	report (Mygol) report (Press)	0'; 0'; 0'

Ilaji International Minifootball Stadium, Oyo, Nigeria
Referee: Mohamed fares Elkaoui
- Bilal Sene

11 July 2021
17:30 UTC+1

Ivory Coast Ivory Cost	1-3	Ghana Ghana
HABIB COME 13'	report (Mygol) report (Press)	BOAKYE 3'; SARFO 48', 53'

Ilaji International Minifootball Stadium, Oyo, Nigeria
Referee: Mohamed fares Elkaoui
- Bilal Sene
11 July 2021
19:00 UTC+1

Egypt	4-0	Burkina Faso
REYAD IBRAHIM 8'; KAMEL MOHAMED 35'; ABDO YASSEN 40'; MOHAMED HASHISH 50'	Report

Ilaji International Minifootball Stadium, Oyo, Nigeria
Referee: Mohamed fares Elkaoui
- Bilal Sene

12 July 2021
16:00 UTC+1

Ivory Coast	1-0	Burkina Faso
HABIB COME 50'	Report

Ilaji International Minifootball Stadium, Oyo, Nigeria
Referee: Mohamed fares Elkaoui
- Bilal Sene

12 July 2021
19:00 UTC+1

Egypt	6-0	Somalia
ABDELNABY ABDELFATTAH 22'; ABDELRAOOF IBRAHEM 25'; MOHAMED HASHISH 35'; KAMEL MOHAMED 39', 42', 47'	Report

Ilaji International Minifootball Stadium, Oyo, Nigeria
Referee: Mohamed fares Elkaoui
- Bilal Sene

13 July 2021
19:00 UTC+1

Ivory Coast	5-1	Somalia
JACOB TRA 3', 5', 44'; HABIB COME 5'; MARC STEPHANE GOORE 18'	Report	25+2'

Ilaji International Minifootball Stadium, Oyo, Nigeria
Referee: Mohamed fares Elkaoui
- Bilal Sene

14 July 2021
11:00 UTC+1

Ghana	7-1	Somalia
SARFO 8'; ANANE 10'; BOAKYE 17', 20'; APPIAH - KUBI 32', 45', 48'	report (Mygol) report (Press)	42'

Ilaji International Minifootball Stadium, Oyo, Nigeria
Referee: Mohamed fares Elkaoui
- Bilal Sene
14 July 2021
19:00 UTC+1

Egypt	3-2	Ivory Coast
ABDELRAOOF IBRAHEM 18'; ALI SEROR 42'; MOHAMED HASHISH 45'	Report	JACOB TRA 50'; STEPHANE GOORE 50+1'

Ilaji International Minifootball Stadium, Oyo, Nigeria
Referee: Mohamed fares Elkaoui
- Bilal Sene
14 July 2021
20:30 UTC+1

Burkina Faso	4-0	Somalia
8'; 26'; 27'; 32'	Report

Ilaji International Minifootball Stadium, Oyo, Nigeria
Referee: Mohamed fares Elkaoui
- Bilal Sene

== Knockout stage ==
Quarterfinals
15 July
Nigeria	1 (1)
Ghana (p)	1 (2)
15 July
Libya	6
Burkina Faso	1
15 July
Senegal (W)	0
Ivory Coast	3
15 July
Egypt	2
Zambia	0

Semifinals
16 July
Ghana	2 (0)
Libya (p)	2 (2)
16 July
Egypt	3
Ivory Coast	1

Final
17 July–
Egypt (a.e.t)	1
Libya	0
Third place
17 July
Ivory Coast	2
Ghana	0

=== Quarterfinals ===
15 July 2021
15h00UTC+1

Nigeria	1-1	Ghana
OCHEJE 29'	report (Mygol) report (Press)	AGYEMANG 11'
Penalties
IKANDEIKANDE (penalty missed); JAMES EKONDO (penalty missed); ORELOPE (penalty scored)	1-2	BOAKYE (penalty scored); APPIAH - KUBI (penalty missed); AGYEMANG (penalty scored)

Ilaji International Minifootball Stadium, Oyo, Nigeria
Referee: Mohamed fares Elkaoui
- Bilal Sene

15 july 2021
17h00UTC+1

Libya	6-1	Burkina Faso
IBRAHIM AMER 17', 22'; MOHAMMAD ABDULLAH 17'; IBRAHIM SAID 25'; ALEID ABU ZAYD 36'; ALAJAMI ABUSHRMET 40'	Report	26'

Ilaji International Minifootball Stadium, Oyo, Nigeria
Referee: Mohamed fares Elkaoui
- Bilal Sene

15 July 2021
19h00UTC+1

Egypt	2-0	Zambia
ABDO YASSEN 25'; ABDELHAMID ELSAYED 28'	Report

Ilaji International Minifootball Stadium, Oyo, Nigeria
Referee: Mohamed fares Elkaoui
- Bilal Sene

15 July 2021
21h00UTC+1

Senegal (W)	0-3	Ivory Coast
	report (Mygol) report (Press)

Ilaji International Minifootball Stadium, Oyo, Nigeria
Referee: Mohamed fares Elkaoui
- Bilal Sene

=== Semifinals ===
16 July 2021
18h00UTC+1

Libya	2-2	Ghana
SALM ALHMRWNE 34'; IBRAHIM SAID 40'	report (mygol) report (Press)	SARFO 1'; TETTEH OCANSEY 38'
Penalties
SALM ALHMRWNE (penalty scored); MOHAMMAD ABDULLAH (penalty scored)	2-0	BOAKYE (penalty missed); NANA AGYEMANG (penalty missed)

Ilaji International Minifootball Stadium, Oyo, Nigeria
Referee: Mohamed fares Elkaoui
- Bilal Sene
16 July 2021
20h00UTC+1

Ivory Coast	1-3	Egypt
JUNIOR DIARRASSOUBA 45'	Report	ABDELHAMID ELSAYED 11'; ABDO ABDO YASSEN 26', 41'

Ilaji International Minifootball Stadium, Oyo, Nigeria
Referee: Mohamed fares Elkaoui
- Bilal Sene

=== 3rd place ===
17 July 2021
11h00UTC+1

Ivory Coast	2-0	Ghana
JACOB TRA 30', 43'	report (Mygol) report (press)

Ilaji International Minifootball Stadium, Oyo, Nigeria
Referee: Mohamed fares Elkaoui
- Bilal Sene

=== finals ===
17 July 2021
18h00UTC+1

Libya	(0-0) 0-1 (a.e.t.)	Egypt
	report (Mygol) report (Press AR)	ABDELNABY ABDELFATTAH 58'

Ilaji International Minifootball Stadium, Oyo, Nigeria
Referee: Mohamed fares Elkaoui
- Bilal Sene

== World Cup Qualification ==
5th–8th place semifinals
16 July
Senegal (W)	0
Zambia	3
16 July
Nigeria	3
Burkina Faso (W)	0

5th place
17 July
Nigeria	3
Zambia	2

=== 5th–8th place ===
16 July 2021
16h30UTC+1

Nigeria	3-0	Burkina Faso (W)
	Report

Ilaji International Minifootball Stadium, Oyo, Nigeria
Referee: Mohamed fares Elkaoui
- Bilal Sene
16 July 2021
21h30UTC+1

Senegal (W)	0-3	Zambia
	Report

Ilaji International Minifootball Stadium, Oyo, Nigeria
Referee: Mohamed fares Elkaoui
- Bilal Sene

17 July 2021
15h00UTC+1

Nigeria	3-2	Zambia
KABIR ADEWOLE 11', 31', 50'	Report	14'; 39'

Ilaji International Minifootball Stadium, Oyo, Nigeria
Referee: Mohamed fares Elkaoui
- Bilal Sene

-

== Top Scored ==
All statistics correct as of 17 July 2021.

POS	Player	Team	PLD	Goal
1	Bernard Sarfo	(Ghana)	6	7
2	BI ZAMBLE COBO JACOB TRA	(Ivory Coast)	6	6
3	MOHAMED KHAMIES IBRAHIM SAID	(Libya)	5	5
4	DENNIS AMEYAW APPIAH - KUBI	(Ghana)	7	4
5	MOHAMED YAKOT ABDO ABDO YASSEN	(Egypt)	6	4

== Final ranking ==
Pos	Team	Pld	W	D	L	GF	GA	GD	Pts	Result
1	Egypt	0	0	0	0	0	0	0	0	1st
2	Libya	0	0	0	0	0	0	0	0	2nd
3	Ivory Coast	7	4	0	3	18	8	+10	12	3rd
4	Ghana	7	2	3	2	17	13	+4	9	4th
5	Nigeria	6	3	2	1	12	8	+4	11	Eliminated in the quarter-finals
6	Zambia	6	1	0	5	9	15	−6	3	Eliminated in the quarter-finals
7	Senegal	5	2	0	3	7	14	−7	6	Eliminated in the quarter-finals
8	Burkina Faso	6	1	1	4	8	17	−9	4	Eliminated in the quarter-finals
9	Somalia	4	0	0	4	1	21	−20	0	Eliminated in group stage

== Qualified teams for the WMF World Cup ==
The following three teams from CAF qualified for the 2021 WMF World Cup.

Team	Qualified on	Previous appearances in tournament^{1}
Egypt	16 July 2021	0
Ivory Coast	16 July 2021	1 (2017)
Ghana	16 July 2021	1 (2019)
Libya	16 July 2021	1 (2017)
Nigeria	17 July 2021	1 (2019)

^{1} Bold indicates champion for that year. Italic indicates host for that year.
