= Jorkyball =

Variant of football

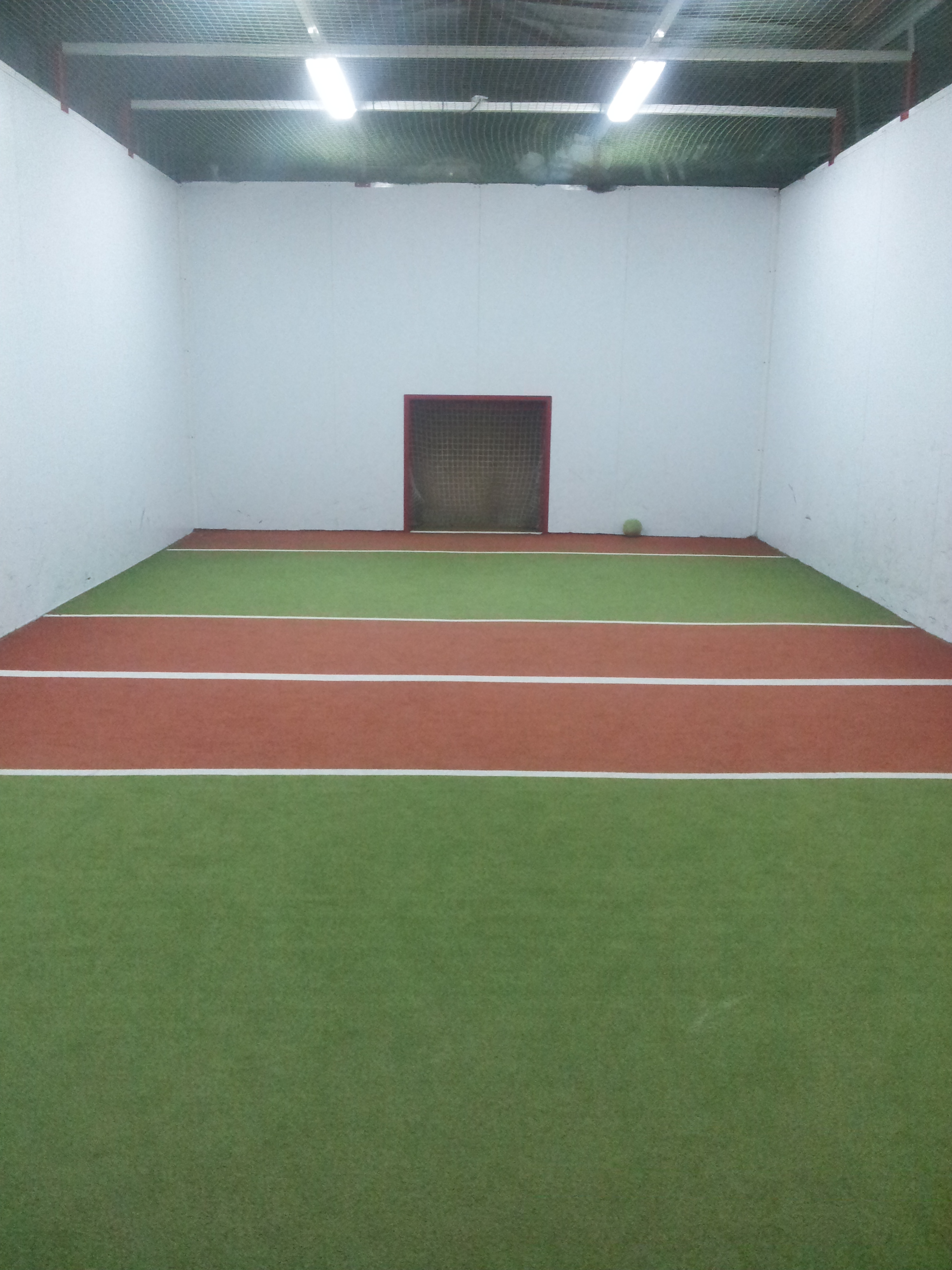
- A jorkyball court
- First played: 1987 in France

Characteristics
- Team members: 2 per side
- Mixed-sex: Male and female
- Type: Indoor
- Venue: Jorkyball court

Presence
- Olympic: No
- Paralympic: No

Jorkyball is a format of two vs two small-sided version of minifootball, inspired by association football. It is played in a 10 m (33 ft) by 5 m (16 ft) cage on artificial turf with the possibility of using the walls to pass, dribble and score. The sport is played in a four-walled court.

== Jorkyball International Federation ==
Jorkyball International Federation (JIF) was founded in 2014. The president of the JIF is Gilles Paniez and its headquarters are in Rome, Italy.

== Members ==
13 nations in March 2025:

Italy, France, Portugal, Spain, Hungary, Poland, Belgium, Switzerland, Israel, Japan, India, Canada, Mexico

== Events ==
1. JIF World Cup: 2018 Canada, 2021 Japan, 2023 Poland
2. European Jorkyball Championships: 2021 France
3. Jorkyball JIF League: 2019 Portugal
4. 1st JIF World Female Cup for Nations (2015)

== History ==
Three on two jorkyball was invented by the French Gilles Paniez in 1987. Jorkyball was first played in front of a large audience at the 1990 FIFA World Cup in Italy as an exhibition.

== Rules ==
A jorkyball game is played in three sets of seven goals each. The first team to reach two sets wins. Each team is made up of one striker and one defender. The striker is not allowed to play in the kickoff areas. At the end of each set, defender and striker change role. The defender is not allowed to play in the opponent's side of the court.

== Game elements ==
The pitch of 2 vs 2 jorkyball is a parallelepiped.

- Length: 9.80 m (32 ft)
- Width: 4.80 m (16 ft)
- Height: 2.70 m (9 ft)
- Goal size: 110 cm × 110 cm (43 in × 43 in)

The ball weighs 200 g (7 oz).
