= Association management company =

An association management company, or AMC, provides management and specialized administrative services to non-profit trade associations and professional associations using a for-profit approach. Many AMCs serve as an organization's headquarters, managing day-to-day operations and becoming the public face of the organization.

Services may include executive, administrative and financial management; strategic planning; membership development; public affairs and lobbying; education and professional development; statistical research; meetings management; and marketing and communication services. Orienting board members is common; AMCs lay out expectations for fiduciary oversight and point out conflicts of interest.

More than 600 AMCs worldwide now collectively manage associations ranging in budget size from $50,000 to $16 million and representing more than 3 million members. AMCs can be found in most major U.S. cities.

The Alexandria, Va.-based AMC Institute accredits AMCs under the guidance of the American National Standards Institute. Current employees of AMCs are eligible to apply to become a Certified Association Executive.

== See also ==
- Professional Conference Organiser
- Outline of management
