= Ghetto Games =

European sports competition

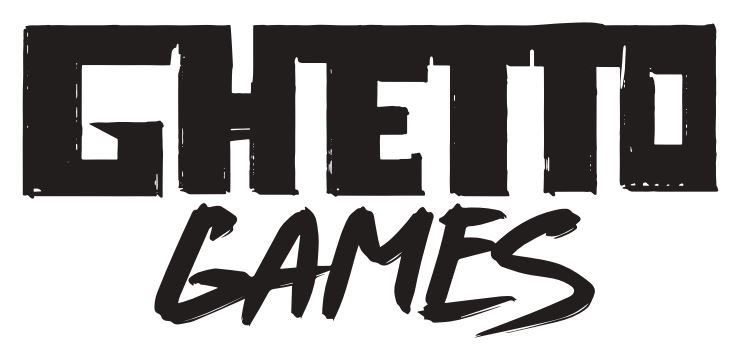
- Founder: Raimonds Elbakjans
- Type: Non-governmental organization
- Purpose: Youth street sports and culture
- Region served: Sport, Culture
- Website: ghetto.lv

The major sports of youth street sports and culture movement Ghetto Games are 3x3 basketball, 3x3 football, 3x3 floorball, pancration - Ghetto Fight, street dance - Ghetto dance and such extreme sports as BMX, skateboarding, extreme inline, scooters, wakeboarding, velo trial and velo trial bikes and freestyle motorcycle. Individual sports might have direction as well, such as 1vs1 football and 1vs1 basketball. The event also includes the musical project similar to X-Factor.

Ghetto Games was founded by former Latvian basketball player Raimonds Elbakjans.

== Events ==
Since 2019:

1. Parkour
2. Skateboard
3. BMX Pink Cloud Games
4. Urban Dance
5. Urban Hip Hop
6. Winter Extreme Sports Event NYC 2019
7. Street Sports Event
8. Medicines For Worlds Ghettos 2019
9. Winterclash
10. PANNONIAN CHALLENGE 2020
11. Football and Basketball Since 2020 (Ghetto Football Round / Ghetto Basket Round)
12. X GAMES SHANGHAI 2020
13. Super Ball 2021 World open Freestyle Football championships
14. Ghetto Football Euro League in 2022
15. Open Freestyle Football Competition 2022
16. Open Panna 1v1 Competition 2022
17. Ghetto Football World Cup 2023
18. Ghetto Football Euro Tour 2023

== The Mission ==
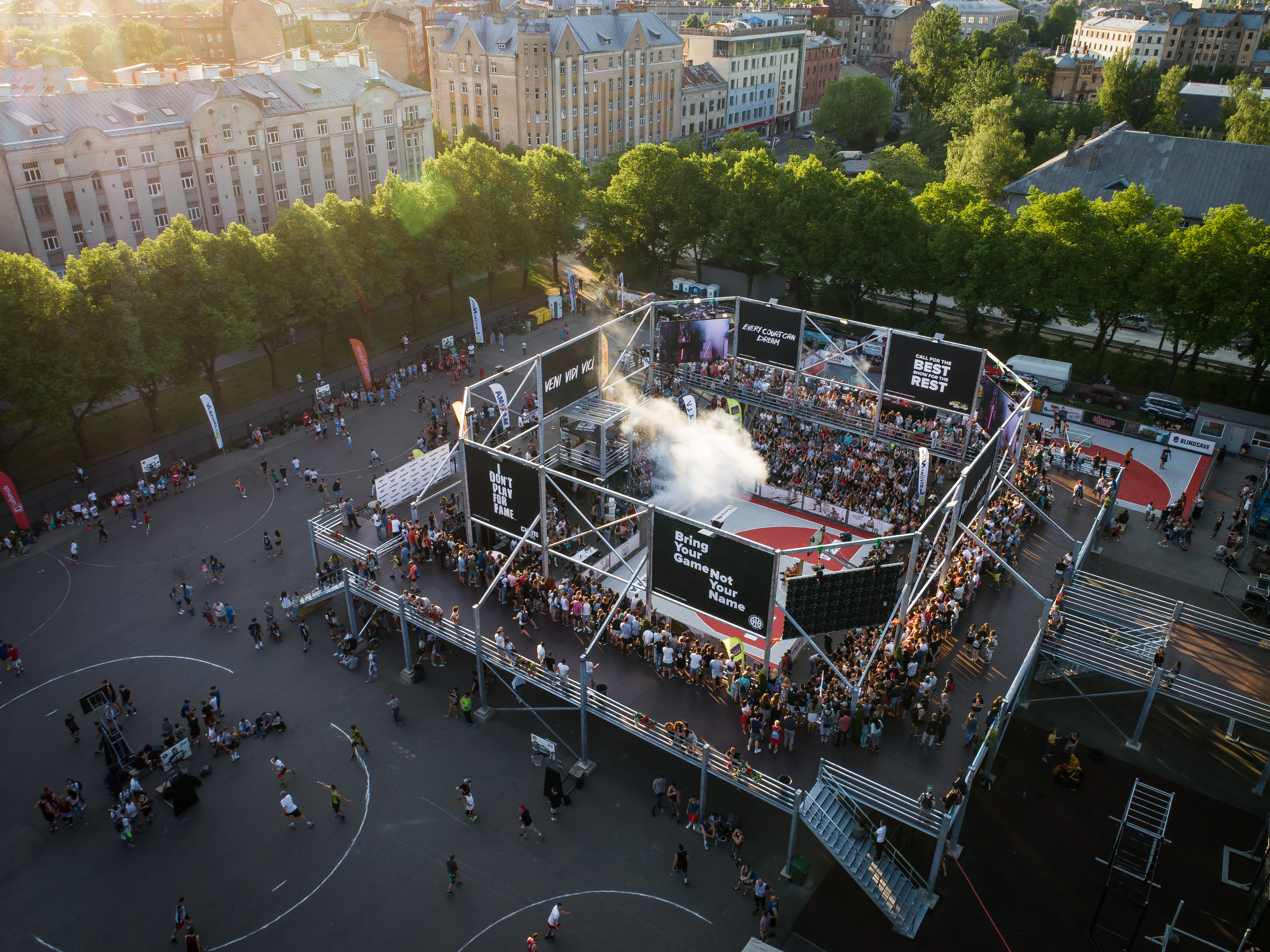
Ghetto Games slam dunk contest in Riga, Latvia (2018)

The mission of Ghetto Games is to create a platform for young people to develop their talents - where they can open up physically and morally as well as create a place where people who were dropped out of school or rejected from other places, would feel accepted.

== Ghetto Art ==
Vladislav Lakse joined Ghetto Games in the first season and did his first form of digital art about street basketball which was later used in Ghetto street art.

== Ghetto Football Euro League 2022 ==
Eleven 3x3 street football tournaments, in eleven European countries - "Ghetto Football Euro League 2022" will take place in eleven countries - Italy, Croatia, Hungary, Czech Republic, Belgium, the Netherlands, Denmark, Germany, Poland, Lithuania, the final, in the capital of Latvia, Riga.

== Honors ==
- 2018 UEFA Grassroots Awards winners: Bronze Award
- 2016 European Commission granted award #BeActive Local Hero for work with young people on grassroots level

https://www.youtube.com/watch?v=LGQFcjY_nfU&t=56s

== Filmography ==
- From Ghetto to the Olympics Gold (2022)
- From Ghetto to the Olympics (2019)
- Intelligent Hooligans
- This is only beginning (2013)
- This is our freedom (2012)
- 60 events in 90 days (2010)
