= 2019 WMF Continental Cup =

Tournament details
- Host country: Tunisia
- Dates: 14–16 March
- Teams: 8 (from 4 confederations)
- Venue: 1 (in 1 host city)

Final positions
- Champions: Czech Republic (1st title)
- Runners-up: Tunisia
- Third place: Romania
- Fourth place: England

Tournament statistics
- Matches played: 14
- Goals scored: 122 (8.71 per match)
- Top scorer: (Guatemala) Wuilian Arriaga (8 goals)
- Best player: (England) Bilal Butt

The 2019 WMF Continental Cup was the inaugural edition of the WMF Continental Cup organized by the World Minifootball Federation (WMF). The tournament was contested in Tunis in Tunisia between 14 and 16 March 2019. Czech Republic defeated hosts Tunisia 5–4 in the final, to win the title.

== Teams ==
The eight teams were divided into two groups of four teams each. The first-placed teams advanced to the final while the second-placed teams advanced to the third-place match.

Europe

- Czech Republic
- England
- Romania
- Switzerland

Africa

- Ivory Coast
- Tunisia (Hosts)

Asia

- Iraq

Panamerican

- Guatemala

== Venue ==
All the matches of 2019 WMF Continental Cup are played in the Five Stars Stadium, Tunis.

Tunis
Five Stars Stadium
Capacity: 2,800

== Group stage ==
=== Group A ===
Pos	Team	Pld	W	D	L	GF	GA	GD	Pts	Qualification
1	Tunisia (H)	3	3	0	0	21	6	+15	9	Advance to final
2	England	3	2	0	1	18	11	+7	6	Advance to Third place match
3	Guatemala	3	1	0	2	13	25	−12	3	
4	Switzerland	0	0	0	0	8	21	−13	0	

Source: WMF
(H) Hosts
14 March 2019
19:00

Tunisia	5−1	Switzerland
Ben Taleb Mohamed Ali 2', 12', 26'; Tayeb Chbil 18'; Karim Mrad 39'		Gabriel Micocci 10'

Five Stars Stadium, Tunis
14 March 2019
20:30

England	10−4	Guatemala
Bilal Butt 2', 18', 23', 25', 47'; Kieron McCann 5', 34'; Charlie Kuehn 28'; James McCluskey 39'; Saman Kanani 44'		Wuilian Arriaga 6', 10', 21', 37'

Five Stars Stadium, Tunis

15 March 2019
11:00

Tunisia	9−0	Guatemala
Karim Mrad 8', 36'; Mohamed Moumi 13'; Ben Taleb Mohamed Ali 27'; Achraf Sati 36'; Hamza Firas Maiza 33'; Marwan Miraoui 35'; Montasser Hichri 46', 49'

Five Stars Stadium, Tunis
15 March 2019
12:30

England	7−1	Switzerland
Charlie Kuehn 7'; Kieron McCann 11', 41'; Bilal Butt 28', 36', 46'; Ross Cable 49'		Mathias Benzoni 32'

Five Stars Stadium, Tunis

15 March 2019
19:00

Switzerland	6−9	Guatemala
Rui Matos 2', 17'; Jairo Moro 15', 46'; Jozef Preqi 31', 32'		Guillermo Ardor 9'; Silva 11'; Wuilian Arriaga 14', 33', 40', 44'; Avanguo 30', 38'; Roberto Morales 40'

Five Stars Stadium, Tunis
15 March 2019
20:30

Tunisia	3−0	England
Walid Abdelli 22'; Karim Mrad 25'; Mohamid Chitiwi 25'

Five Stars Stadium, Tunis

=== Group B ===
Pos	Team	Pld	W	D	L	GF	GA	GD	Pts	Qualification
1	Czech Republic	3	2	1	0	28	13	+15	7	Advance to final
2	Romania	3	2	1	0	23	7	+16	7	Advance to Third place match
3	Ivory Coast	3	1	0	2	10	12	−2	3	
4	Iraq	3	0	0	3	1	26	−25	0	

Source: WMF
14 March 2019
11:30

Romania	8−0	Iraq
Razvan Plopeanu 5'; Andrei Brasoveanu 17'; Florin Matache 23' (pen.); Robert Dragan Paulevici 27'; Cosmin Amarinei 28'; Radu Burciu 34'; Vlad Mocanu 36', 42'

Five Stars Stadium, Tunis
14 March 2019
22:00

Czech Republic	12−0	Iraq
Tomáš Jelínek 1', 7'; Ondřej Bíro 2'; David Presl 4', 5', 26'; Pavel Šultes 24'; Jiří Sodoma 26'; Jan Tögel 33'; Tomáš Jun 34'; Tomáš Režný 39'; Daniel Kasal 44'

Five Stars Stadium, Tunis

15 March 2019
9:30

Romania	6−1	Ivory Coast
Traian Alecu 3'; Sebastian Vasile 14'; Andrei Carstea 16'; Razvan Plopeanu 33', 36'; Robert Dragan Paulevici 35'		Jacob Trabi 8'

Five Stars Stadium, Tunis
15 March 2019
16:00

Ivory Coast	6−1	Iraq
Moussa Dembele 13', 15', 20'; Jacob Trabi 25', 29', 36'		Kazem Ayad Hussein 27'

Five Stars Stadium, Tunis

15 March 2019
17:30

Czech Republic	6−6	Romania
Pavel Šultes 8'; Tomáš Kounovský 10'; Tomáš Jelínek 13'; Jan Tögel 33', 47'; Ondřej Bíro 46'		Robert Dragan Paulevici 2'; Traian Alecu 6'; Marian Boieșan 16'; Cosmin Amarinei 29'; Ionuţ Chirică 43'; Radu Burciu 46'

Five Stars Stadium, Tunis
16 March 2019
10:00

Czech Republic	5−3	Ivory Coast
Daniel Kasal ?', ?'; David Presl ?'; Zepherin Vovo Lago ?' (o.g.); David Macko ?'		Jacob Trabi ?'; Lionel Boyou Kadje ?'; Youssef Trawi ?'

Five Stars Stadium, Tunis

== Knockout stage ==
Team 1	Score	Team 2
England	1−3	Romania
Tunisia	4−5	Czech Republic

=== Third place match ===
16 March 2019
17:00

England	1−3	Romania
James McCluskey 30'		Andrei Carstea 1'; Radu Burciu 14'; Razvan Plopeanu 27'

Five Stars Stadium, Tunis

=== Final ===
16 March 2019
19:00

Tunisia	4−5	Czech Republic
Ben Taleb Mohamed Ali 14'; Omar Nasri 23'; Karim Mrad 27'; Montasser Hichri 52'		Ondřej Bíro 1'; Daniel Kasal 6'; Tomáš Kounovský 22'; David Presl 34'; David Macko 41'

Five Stars Stadium, Tunis

== Awards ==
The following awards were given at the conclusion of the tournament:

Best Player
(England) Bilal Butt
Top Scorer
(Guatemala) Wuilian Arriaga
(8 goals)
