= AMC (newspaper) =

- Type: News website
- Format: Online newspaper
- Owner: Africa Media Corporation
- Founded: 2020; 6 years ago
- Language: English
- Headquarters: Gaborone, Botswana

AMC is an English-language online newspaper published in Botswana by Africa Media Corporation. Established in 2020, it features articles in the fields of politics, foreign affairs, business and the economy, culture, law, technology, and science.

== See also ==
- Botswana Guardian
- BusinessTech
- Daily Maverick
- Daily News Botswana
