= WMF Continental Cup =

- Organising body: WMF
- Founded: 2019; 6 years ago
- Region: International
- Number of teams: 8
- Current champions: Czech Republic (1st title)
- Most successful team(s): Czech Republic (1 title)
- 2019 WMF Continental Cup

The WMF Continental Cup, is an international minifootball competition among the senior men's national teams of the members of the World Minifootball Federation (WMF), the sport's global governing body. The tournament was played once and was held in Tunisia in 2019 with the participation of eight teams, where Czech Republic defeated hosts Tunisia 5–4 in the final, to win the title.

== Results ==
=== Editions ===
Ed.	Year	Host	First place game			Third place game			Teams
Ed.	Year	Host	(gold) Champion	Score	(silver) Runner-up	(bronze) Third place	Score	Fourth place	Teams
1	2019	Tunisia	Czech Republic	5–4	Tunisia	Romania	3–1	England	8

=== Summary ===
Team	Champion	Runner-up	Third place	Fourth place
Czech Republic	1 (2019)	—	—	—
Tunisia	—	1 (2019)	—	—
Romania	—	—	1 (2019)	—
England	—	—	—	1 (2019)

=== Medal table ===
Rank	Nation	Gold	Silver	Bronze	Total
1	Czech Republic	1	0	0	1
2	Tunisia	0	1	0	1
3	Romania	0	0	1	1
Totals (3 entries)		1	1	1	3

== Awards ==
Individual awards are given out at the end of each tournament.

Year	Best Player	Top Scorer
2019	(England) Bilal Butt	(Guatemala) Wuilian Arriaga (8)

== Participating nations ==
Teams	(Tunisia) 2019 (8)	Years
Czech Republic	1st	4
England	4th	2
Guatemala	GS	3
Iraq	GS	3
Ivory Coast	GS	1
Romania	3rd	4
Switzerland	GS	1
Tunisia	2nd	2
Total: 8 teams	8	

Legends

- 1st – Champions
- 2nd – Runners-up
- 3rd – Third place
- 4th – Fourth place
- GS – Group stage
- – Hosts
