= 2024 African Minifootball Cup =

Tournament details
- Host country: South Africa
- Dates: 20–29 September
- Teams: 8 (originally 14) (from 1 confederation)
- Venue: 1 (in 1 host city)

Final positions
- Champions: South Africa (1st title)
- Runners-up: Mauritania
- Third place: Egypt
- Fourth place: Chad

Tournament statistics
- Top scorer(s): (South Africa) Jose Garcia (... goals)
- Best player: (Egypt) Mahmoud El Shenawy
- Best goalkeeper: (Mauritania) Brahim Mohamed
- All statistics correct as of 02 October 2024.

The 2024 African Minifootball Cup is the third edition of the African Minifootball Cup held by the African Minifootball Confederation (AMC). The tournament was held in South Africa from 20 to 29 September 2024. The tournament was initially planned to be held from 19 to 26 May 2024 but it was finally postponed to September 2024.

== Participating nations ==
- Cameroon
- Chad
- Egypt
- Ghana
- Mauritius
- Mauritania
- South Africa (hosts)
- Zambia

Withrawal nations

- DR Congo
- Lesotho
- Libya
- Nigeria
- Somalia
- Uganda

== Venues ==
Cities	Venues	Capacity
Johannesburg	... Stadium	

== Group stage ==
=== Group A ===
Pos	Team	Pld	W	D	L	GF	GA	GD	Pts	Qualification
1	Mauritania	3	3	0	0	9	2	+7	9	Knockout stage
2	South Africa (H)	3	2	0	1	8	4	+4	6	Knockout stage
3	Zambia	3	1	0	2	9	7	+2	3	
4	Mauritius	3	0	0	3	1	14	−13	0	

(H) Hosts
22 September 2024
18:00 UTC+1

South Africa	3–1	Mauritius

23 September 2024
14:30 UTC+1

Mauritania	3–1	Zambia

24 September 2024
14:30 UTC+1

Mauritius	0–4	Mauritania

24 September 2024
15:45 UTC+1

South Africa	4–1	Zambia

25 September 2024
15:45 UTC+1

Mauritius	0–7	Zambia

25 September 2024
17:00 UTC+1

South Africa	1–2	Mauritania

=== Group B ===
Pos	Team	Pld	W	D	L	GF	GA	GD	Pts	Qualification
1	Egypt	3	3	0	0	8	2	+6	9	Knockout stage
2	Chad	3	1	1	1	6	6	0	4	Knockout stage
3	Cameroon	3	1	0	2	3	6	−3	3	
4	Ghana	3	0	1	2	4	7	−3	1	

22 September 2024
15:45 UTC+1

Cameroon	3–1	Ghana

22 September 2024
17:00 UTC+1

Egypt	4–1	Chad

23 September 2024
15:45 UTC+1

Egypt	2–0	Cameroon

23 September 2024
17:00 UTC+1

Ghana	2–2	Chad

25 September 2024
13:00 UTC+1

Chad	0–0^{1}	Cameroon

^1 AMF declared Chad winners of the match against Cameroon 3–0 because participation of an eligible player with Cameroon after receiving two yellow cards in the two first matches.

25 September 2024
14:30 UTC+1

Egypt	2–1	Ghana

== Knockout stage ==
Semifinals
27 September – ...
Mauritania	3
Chad	1
27 September – ...
Egypt	1 (3)
South Africa (p)	1 (4)

Final
29 September – Pretoria
Mauritania	4
South Africa	5
Third place
29 September – ...
Chad	1 (3)
Egypt (p)	1 (5)

=== Semi-finals ===
27 September 2024
..:.. UTC+1

Mauritania	3–1	Chad

27 September 2024
..:.. UTC+1

Egypt	1–1	South Africa
Penalties
	3–4

=== Third place match ===
29 September 2024
..:.. UTC+1

Chad	1–1	Egypt
Penalties
	3–5

...

=== Final ===
29 September 2024
19:00 UTC+1

Mauritania	4–5	South Africa

Pretoria

== World Cup qualification stage ==
5th–8th place
26 September – ...
Zambia	2
Ghana	3
26 September – ...
Chad (p)^{2}	2 (4)
Mauritius	2 (3)

Fifth place
29 September – Johannesburg
Ghana	2
Mauritius	0

^2 Match between Chad and Mauritius not counted, after AMF declared Chad winners of the match against Cameroon in the group stage. Chad qualified to a knockout stage and Mauritius qualified to the fifth match place.

=== 5th–8th place matches ===
26 September 2024
..:.. UTC+1

Zambia	2–3	Ghana

26 September 2024
..:.. UTC+1

Chad	2–2^{2}	Mauritius
Penalties
	4–3

=== Fifth place match ===
29 September 2024
..:.. UTC+1

Ghana	2–0	Mauritius

Johannesburg

== Final ranking ==
Pos	Team	Pld	W	D	L	GF	GA	GD	Pts	Final result
1	South Africa (H)	5	3	1	1	14	9	+5	10	Champions
2	Mauritania	5	4	0	1	16	8	+8	12	Runners-up
3	Egypt	5	3	2	0	10	4	+6	11	Third place
4	Chad	5	1	2	2	8	10	−2	5	Fourth place
5	Ghana	5	2	1	2	9	9	0	7	Eliminated at the group stage
6	Mauritius	3	0	0	3	1	14	−13	0	Eliminated at the group stage
7	Zambia	4	1	0	3	11	10	+1	3	Eliminated at the group stage
8	Cameroon	3	1	0	2	3	6	−3	3	Eliminated at the group stage

(H) Hosts

== Qualified teams for the 2025 WMF World Cup ==
The following four teams from CAF qualified for the 2025 WMF World Cup in Baku, Azerbaijan.

Team	Qualified on	Previous appearances at the WMF World Cup
Egypt	25 September 2023	1 (2023)
Mauritania	25 September 2024	0 (debut)
South Africa	25 September 2024	1 (2019)
Chad	26 September 2024	0 (debut)
Ghana	29 September 2023	2 (2019, 2023)
