= 2018 African Minifootball Cup =

كأس أفريقيا لكرة القدم المصغرة 2018

Tournament details
- Host country: Libya
- Dates: 5–12 May
- Teams: 8 (from 1 confederation)
- Venue: 1 (in 1 host city)

Final positions
- Champions: Ivory Coast (1st title)
- Runners-up: Senegal
- Third place: Tunisia
- Fourth place: Libya

Tournament statistics
- Matches played: 16
- Goals scored: 93 (5.81 per match)

The 2018 African Minifootball Cup was the first edition of the African Minifootball Cup held by the African Minifootball Confederation. The tournament was contested in Tripoli in Libya between 5 and 12 May 2018. Ivory Coast defeated Senegal 3–1 by penalties after a 3–3 draw in the final, to win the title. This tournament served as the qualification for the 2019 WMF World Cup for the best four teams.

== Venue ==
Libya was awarded the right to host the event on 16 October 2017. All the matches are played at the Al-Madina Stadium in Tripoli.

Tripoli
Al-Madina Stadium
Capacity: 1,500

== Teams ==
=== Participating nations ===
- Ghana
- Ivory Coast
- Libya (Hosts)
- Nigeria
- Senegal
- Somalia
- South Africa
- Tunisia

== Group stage ==
=== Group A ===
Pos	Team	Pld	W	D	L	GF	GA	GD	Pts	Qualification
1	Libya	3	3	0	0	10	0	+10	9	Advance to knockout stage
2	Ivory Coast	3	2	0	1	14	2	+12	6	Advance to knockout stage
3	Ghana	3	1	0	2	6	12	−6	3	
4	Somalia	3	0	0	3	3	19	−16	0	

Source: AMC
5 May 2018
19:00

Libya	1–0	Ivory Coast
Youssef Ben Saud 11'

Al-Madina Stadium, Tripoli
5 May 2018
20:15

Somalia	2–6	Ghana

Al-Madina Stadium, Tripoli

7 May 2018
19:00

Ivory Coast	6–0	Ghana

Al-Madina Stadium, Tripoli
7 May 2018
20:15

Somalia	0–5	Libya
		Hossam Toumi 15'; Abu Bakr Boukhattala 20'; Mohamed Albahli 25'; Mohamed Ghaleb 33'; Hamid Hamrouni 50+2'

Al-Madina Stadium, Tripoli

9 May 2018
19:00

Ivory Coast	8–1	Somalia
Moussa Dembele 1', 6', 12', 13'; Habib Samba Come 22', 44'; Zepherin Vovo Lago 28'; Issouf Traore 39'		Fazad Abdullah 31'

Al-Madina Stadium, Tripoli
9 May 2018
20:15

Libya	4–0	Ghana
Aldernawi Ramadan 5'; Abdul Hamid Albakbek 12'; Youssef Ben Saud 23', 28'

Al-Madina Stadium, Tripoli

=== Group B ===
Pos	Team	Pld	W	D	L	GF	GA	GD	Pts	Qualification
1	Tunisia	3	2	1	0	22	2	+20	7	Advance to knockout stage
2	Senegal	3	1	2	0	11	4	+7	5	Advance to knockout stage
3	Nigeria	3	1	1	1	12	6	+6	4	
4	South Africa	3	0	0	3	2	35	−33	0	

Source: AMC
6 May 2018
19:00

Senegal	1–1	Tunisia
Sidath Ndiaye 48'		Ouday Belhaj 44'

Al-Madina Stadium, Tripoli
6 May 2018
20:15

South Africa	1–9	Nigeria
41'		Ifieymi Inola 15'; Abbas Gazali 21'; Felix Kenan 22', 23', 28', 32'; Ajayi Samson Bolaji 32', 41'; Okonkwo Joseph Chigozie 48'

Al-Madina Stadium, Tripoli

8 May 2018
19:15

Tunisia	3–1	Nigeria
Ouday Belhaj 11'; Iheb Ben Salem 25'; Walid Abdelli 37'		Ajayi Samson Bolaji 7'

Al-Madina Stadium, Tripoli
8 May 2018
20:15

Senegal	8–1	South Africa
Momo Cissé 3'; Moustapha Nam 5'; Sidath Ndiaye 6', 7'; Alex 23'; Mohamed Fadel 34', 38', 43'		25'

Al-Madina Stadium, Tripoli

10 May 2018
19:00

South Africa	0–18	Tunisia
		?' ?' ?' ?' ?'; Iheb Ben Salem 18'; Hamid Al Dahli 28', 35'; Moez Al Bhoush 31', 23'; Achraf Sati 33'; Ouday Belhaj 39', 41', 45'; Walid Krout 39'; Walid Abdelli 42'; Iskander Ben Hmida 49', 50'

Al-Madina Stadium, Tripoli
10 May 2018
20:15

Senegal	2–2	Nigeria
Karifa Camara 5'; Momo Cissé ?'		Felix Kenan ?'; Cornelius Ebuka Ekezi ?'

Al-Madina Stadium, Tripoli

== Knockout stage ==
=== Bracket ===
Semifinals
11 May – Tripoli
Tunisia	2 (6)
Ivory Coast (p)	2 (7)
11 May – Tripoli
Libya	1 (2)
Senegal (p)	1 (3)

Final
12 May – Tripoli
Ivory Coast (p)	3 (3)
Senegal	3 (1)
Third place
12 May – Tripoli
Tunisia	1
Libya	0

=== Semi-finals ===
11 May 2018
19:00

Ivory Coast	2–2	Tunisia
Walid Krout 9'; Ouday Belhaj 14'		Zepherin Vovo Lago 16'; Lionel Boyou Kadje 29'
Penalties
Zepherin Vovo Lago (penalty scored); Lionel Boyou Kadje (penalty scored); Moussa Dembelé (penalty scored); Habib Samba Come (penalty scored); Jacob Trabi (penalty scored); Issouf Traore (penalty scored)	6–7	(penalty scored) Iheb Ben Salem; (penalty scored) Ouday Belhaj; (penalty scored) Walid Barsilo; (penalty scored) Nader Bin Hamida; (penalty scored) Khaled Bin Ammar; (penalty missed) Moez Al Bhoush

Al-Madina Stadium, Tripoli

11 May 2018
20:30

Libya	1–1	Senegal
Hamid Hamrouni 50' (pen.)		Seck Elhadji Mbacke 31'
Penalties
Mohamed Ghaleb (penalty missed); Hamid Hamrouni (penalty scored); Hassan Shaheen (penalty scored)	2–3	(penalty scored) Mohamed Fadel; (penalty scored) Sidath Ndiaye; (penalty scored) Momo Cissé

Al-Madina Stadium, Tripoli

=== 3rd place match ===
12 May 2018
19:00

Tunisia	1–0	Libya
Hamid Al Dahli 11'

Al-Madina Stadium, Tripoli

=== Final ===
12 May 2018
21:00 UTC+2

Ivory Coast	3–3	Senegal
Jacob Trabi 11', 38'; Papa Mbaye Ndiaye 28' (o.g.)		Moustapha Nam 26', 50+2'; Seck Elhadji Mbacke 32'
Penalties
Zepherin Vovo Lago (penalty scored); Lionel Boyou Kadje (penalty scored); Moussa Dembelé (penalty scored)	3–1	(penalty missed) Mohamed Fadel; (penalty scored) Sidath Ndiaye

Al-Madina Stadium, Tripoli

== Qualified teams for the WMF World Cup ==
The following three teams from CAF qualified for the 2019 WMF World Cup.

Team	Qualified on	Previous appearances in tournament^{1}
Ivory Coast	9 May 2018	1 (2017)
Libya	9 May 2018	1 (2017)
Senegal	10 May 2018	1 (2017)
Tunisia	10 May 2018	1 (2017)

^{1} Bold indicates champion for that year. Italic indicates host for that year.
