= Asian Minifootball Confederation =

Administrative body for a type of minifootball

Asian Mini Football Confederation
- Abbreviation: ANMC
- Formation: 1 February 2020; 6 years ago
- Type: Sports organisation
- Headquarters: Mumbai, India
- Region served: Asia
- Members: 20+
- President: (Indonesia) Eric Tuapattinaya
- Secretary General: (India) Vitthal Shirgaonkar
- Parent organization: WMF
- Website: https://asianminifootball.com/

The Asian Mini Football Confederation (ANMC), previously known as AMC, is the administrative body for 6-a-side version of minifootball in Asia. It is one of five continental confederations of World Minifootball Federation.

== History ==
The ANMC's assembly was held in 2014 in Goa, India. . The body was created and a founding president, Sunil Purnapatre (president of the Minifootball Association of India Minifootball Federation), was elected. The assembly chose Mumbai as the federation's seat. The meeting was held under the leadership of WMF Mr. Filip Juda and the organization is recognized by World Minifootball Federation as its official governing organization for Asia

The 1st Asian Minifootball Championship was held in Sharjah in March 2025, 12 teams participated. Iran won the 2025 Asian Minifootball Nations Cup in Sharjah, UAE, after defeating Indonesia 3–2 in a close final match in March 2025. Asian Minifootball Confederation (ANMC) Asian Champions League (ACL) 2025 took place from November 17–23, 2025, at the ASIOP Stadium in Jakarta, Indonesia where 12 Club from Asia has participated. Burngreave United FC (UAE) won the title by defeating Al Ataa (Lebanon).

The Asian Minifootball Championship 2026 (ANMC Asia Cup) was held in Jakarta, Indonesia, from 12-19 September 2026. Thailand won the tournament after defeating Uzbekistan 3-2 in the final at ASIOP Stadium on 19 September 2026. United Arab Emirates finished third after a 3-0 victory over Indonesia in the third-place match. The tournament also served as a qualification event for the WMF World Cup 2027 in (Brno, Czechia).

== Events ==
- Asian Mini Football Championship
- Asia Champions League
- Afro-Asian Champions League

== Major tournament records ==
=== Asian Minifootball Championship 2026 ===
Team	2026	Best result
Thailand	1st	Champions
Uzbekistan	2nd	Runner-up
United Arab Emirates	3rd	Third place

- 1st — Champion
- 2nd — Runner-up
- 3rd — Third place
- GS — Group stage
- — Host(s)

=== WMF World Cup ===
Teams	(United States) 2015	(Tunisia) 2017	(Australia) 2019	(Ukraine) 2021	Years
Afghanistan			23rd		1
India	12th	24th	27th		3
Iraq		20th	18th		2
Japan			24th		1
Lebanon		19th	17th		2
Saudi Arabia			16th		1
Singapore			32nd		1
Thailand			20th		1

=== WMF Continental Cup ===
Teams	(Tunisia) 2019	Years
Iraq	GS	1
Total	1	

=== U23 WMF World Cup ===
Teams	(Slovakia) 2018	(Ukraine) 2021	Years
Iraq	GS		1
Japan	GS		1
India	X	GS	1
Total	2	1	
