= African Minifootball Cup =

Continental indoor minifootball competition

- Organiser(s): AMC
- Founded: 2018
- Region: Africa
- Teams: 16
- Current champions: Libya
- Most championships: Libya (3 title )
- 2025 African Minifootball Cup

The African Minifootball Cup is a continental outdoor minifootball competition contested by the senior men's national teams of African Minifootball Confederation (AMC). The fondator is Achraf Ben Salha from Tunisia The first edition was held in Libya in May 2018.

== History ==
Between 2–3 March 2018, the African Minifootball general assembly was held in Tunisia by the president founder, the tunisian Achraf Ben Salha as the momentum for minifootball continued to build throughout the continent. The 2018 calendar was set and it was decided that the African Cup would start in May, serving as qualifying tournament for the 2019 WMF World Cup. Ivory Coast won the inaugural tournament, becoming the first nation to claim the African Minifootball Cup.

On 17 July 2021, Egypt became the second nation to win the African Minifootball Cup after defeating Libya 1–0 in the final. On 26 July 2025, Libya became the second host nation after South Africa to claim the title, after defeating Morocco on penalties in the final.

== Results ==
=== Editions ===
Ed.	Year	Host	First place game			Third place game			Teams
Ed.	Year	Host	(gold) Champion	Score	(silver) Runner-up	(bronze) Third place	Score	Fourth place	Teams
1	2018	Libya	Ivory Coast	3–3 (3–1 p)	Senegal	Tunisia	1–0	Libya	8
2	2021	Nigeria	Egypt	1–0	Libya	Ivory Coast	2–0	Ghana	9
3	2024	South Africa	South Africa	5–4	Mauritania	Egypt	1–1 (5–3 p)	Chad	8
4	2025	Libya	Libya	0–0 (3–2 p)	Morocco	Mauritania	3–2	Guinea	16
5	2027	Guinea	TBD			TBD			TBD

=== Summary ===
Team	Champion	Runner-up	Third place	Fourth place
Libya	1 (2025)	1 (2021)		1 (2018)
Egypt	1 (2021)		1 (2024)	
Ivory Coast	1 (2018)		1 (2021)	
South Africa	1 (2024)			1 (2018)
Senegal		1 (2018)		
Mauritania		1 (2024)		
Morocco		1 (2025)		
Tunisia			1 (2018)	
Ghana				1 (2021)
Chad				1 (2024)

=== Medal table ===
Rank	Nation	Gold	Silver	Bronze	Total
1	Libya	1	1	0	2
2	Egypt	1	0	1	2
2	Ivory Coast	1	0	1	2
4	South Africa	1	0	0	1
5	Mauritania	0	1	0	1
5	Morocco	0	1	0	1
5	Senegal	0	1	0	1
8	Tunisia	0	0	1	1
Totals (8 entries)		4	4	3	11

== Participating nations ==
Team	(Libya) 2018 (8)	(Nigeria) 2021 (9)	(South Africa) 2024 (8)	(Libya) 2025 (16)	Years
Benin	×	×	×	Q	1
Burkina Faso	×	QF	×	Q	2
Cameroon	×	×	GS	Q	2
Chad	×	×	4th	Q	2
DR Congo	×	×	×	Q	1
Egypt	×	1st	3rd	×	2
Ghana	GS	4th	GS	Q	4
Guinea	×	×	×	Q	1
Ivory Coast	1st	3rd	×	Q	3
Libya	4th	2nd	×	Q	3
Mauritania	×	×	2nd	Q	2
Mauritius	×	×	GS	×	1
Morocco	×	×	×	Q	1
Nigeria	GS	QF	×	Q	3
Senegal	2nd	QF	×	×	2
Somalia	GS	GS	×	××	3
South Africa	GS	×	1st	Q	3
Tunisia	3rd	×	×	Q	2
Uganda	×	×	×	Q	1
Zambia	×	QF	GS	Q	3
Total: 19 team	8	9	8	16	

Legends

- 1st – Champions
- 2nd – Runners-up
- 3rd – Third place
- 4th – Fourth place
- QF – Quarter Finals
- GS – Group stage
- Q – Qualified
- × – Did not enter
- ×× – Withdrew
- – Hosts
