= World Minifootball Federation =

International coordinating sports body

- Abbreviation: WMF
- Formation: 2008; 18 years ago
- Headquarters: Prague, Czech Republic
- Region served: Worldwide
- President: (Czech Republic) Filip Juda
- Secretary general: (Serbia) Zorica Hofman
- Vice presidents: (United States) Kevin Milliken (Tunisia) Achraf Ben Salha (Slovakia) Peter Kralik (India) Vitthal Shirgaonkar
- Website: www.minifootball.com

The World Minifootball Federation (WMF) is the global governing body for mainly 5 and 6-a-side versions of minifootball (also called arena soccer) in 50 (2*25) Minutes time. WMF exists to promote, supervise and direct minifootball growth, focusing on amateur players.

== Time ==
25 Min + 10 Min + 25 Min / 2*5 Over time / 3v3 Penalty kicks

== History ==
Minifootball leagues and other events are organized by the WMF and its continental, national or local affiliates. The best teams from local leagues will advance to national championships. With the World Cup scheduled every two years, WMF also hosts the Continental Cup (top five nations of each federation), U23 World Cup, Women's World Cup and Champions Cup (top clubs of each federation), among other events. In November 2013 it was announced that WMF World Cup would be hosted in the United States. United States defeated Mexico 5–3 in the 2015 Final. The second edition of the WMF World Cup was played in Tunisia in October 2017.

== Continental federations ==
- African Minifootball Confederation (AMC)
- Asian Minifootball Confederation (ANMC)
- European Minifootball Federation (EMF)
- Oceania Minifootball Federation (OMF)
- Panamerican Minifootball Federation (PAMF)
- Arab Minifootball Federation (AMF)

== Competitions ==
Competition	Year	Champions	Next edition
National teams (Men's)
WMF World Cup	2025	Azerbaijan	2027 TBD
WMF Continental Cup	2019	Czech Republic	
WMF U23 World Cup	2026	Serbia	TBD
WMF U21 World Cup	2018	Czech Republic	
National teams (Women's)
WMF Women’s World Cup	2026	United States	TBD
