= African Minifootball Confederation =

African sports organization

- Abbreviation: AMC
- Formation: 14 December 2016; 9 years ago
- Type: Sports organisation
- Headquarters: Tunis, Tunisia
- Region served: Africa
- Members: 10 (Executive Committee)
- President: (Tunisia) Achraf Ben Salha
- Parent organization: World Minifootball Federation
- Website: https://minifootball.africa

The African Minifootball Confederation (AMC) and previously known as African Minifootball Federation (AMF), is the administrative body for 5-a-side version of minifootball in Africa. It is one of five continental confederations of world football's governing body, the World Minifootball Federation.

== History ==
Old logo

The African Minifootball Confederation's assembly was held in December 2016 in Tunis, Tunisia. The body was created and a new president, Achraf Ben Salha (the 1st president of the Tunisian Minifootball Federation and the vice president of the World Minifootball Federation), was elected.

== Competitions ==
Competition	Year	Champions	Next edition
National teams (Men's)
African Minifootball Cup	2025	Libya	2027 (Guinea)
National teams (Women's)
African Women’s Minifootball Cup	—	—	2026 (Cameroon) (8-13 August)
Club teams (Men's)
African Minifootball Champions League	2025	(Libya) CA Zliten	
Afro-Asian Minifootball Champions League	2025		

== Major tournament records ==
- 1st — Champion
- 2nd — Runner-up
- 3rd — Third place
- GS — Group stage
- R16 — Round of 16
- QF — Quarter finals
- — Host(s)

=== WMF World Cup ===
Teams	(United States) 2015	(Tunisia) 2017	(Australia) 2019	(United Arab Emirates) 2023	(Azerbaijan) 2025	Years
Algeria				GS		1
Chad					GS	1
Egypt				R16	WD	1
Ghana			R16	GS	GS	3
Ivory Coast		GS				1
Libya		R16		GS		2
Mauritania					QF	1
Nigeria			GS			1
Senegal		3rd				1
Somalia		GS	GS			2
South Africa			GS		WD	1
Sudan				GS		1
Tunisia		QF	R16			2
Total	0	5	5	5	3	

=== WMF Continental Cup ===
Teams	(Tunisia) 2019	Years
Ivory Coast	GS	1
Tunisia	2nd	1
Total	2	

=== WMF Women’s World Cup ===
Teams	(Ukraine) 2021	(Croatia) 2024	Years
Egypt	4th	WD	1
Total	1	0	

=== U23 WMF World Cup ===
Teams	(Slovakia) 2018	(Ukraine) 2021	(Croatia) 2024	Years
Egypt		4th		1
Senegal	QF			1
Tunisia	GS			1
Total	2	1	0	
