= Minifootball =

Variant of association football

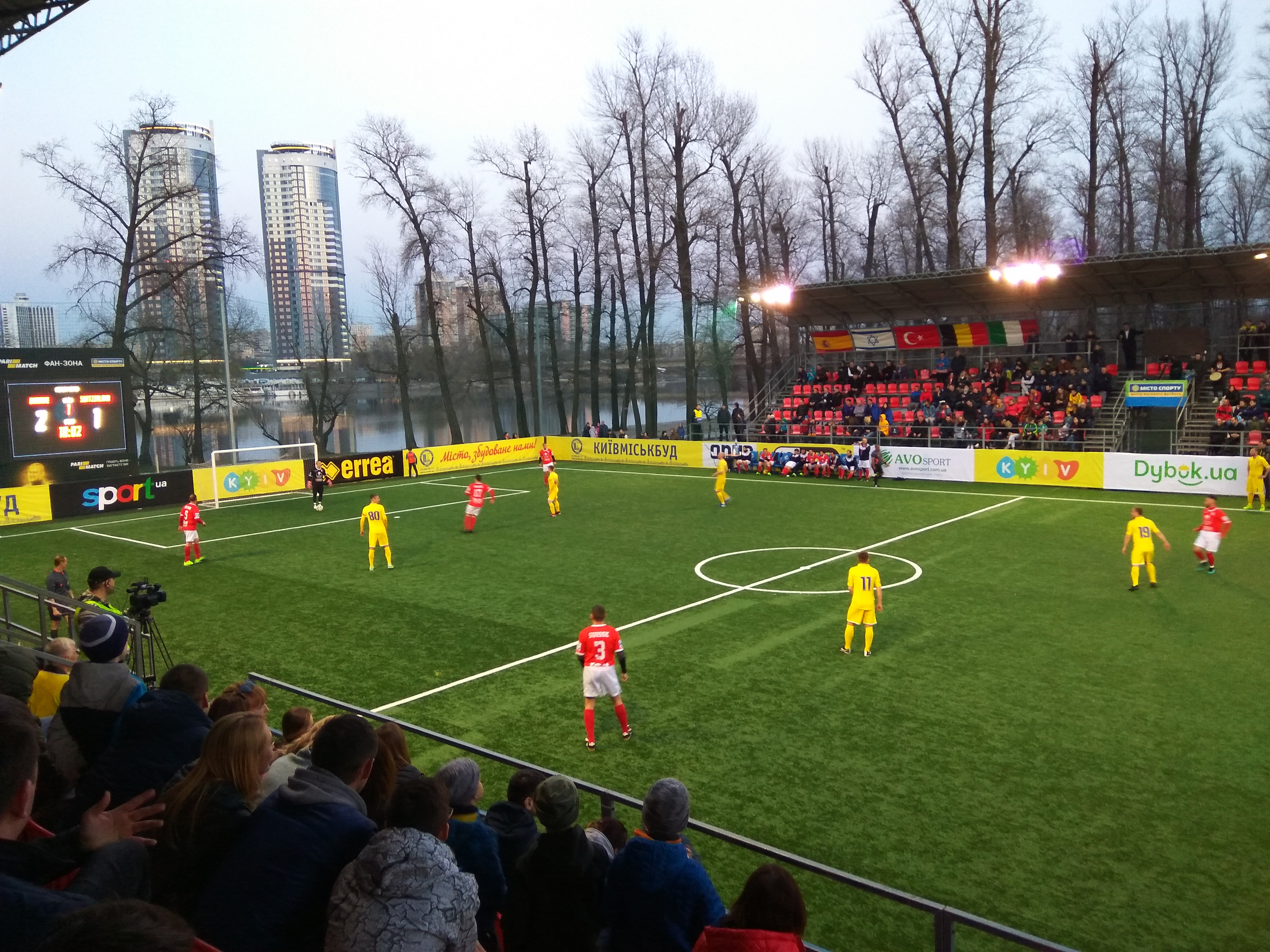
- Highest governing body: WMF (Minifootball); ISF (Socca); IFA7, FIF7, FIFO7S (7-a-side); JIF (Jorkyball); IBSA (blind football); IFCPF (CP football)

Characteristics
- Contact: Yes
- Team members: Fewer than 11 per side (including goalkeeper)
- Mixed-sex: No
- Type: Team sport, Football
- Venue: Football pitch (artificial turf on Socca)

Presence
- Olympic: No
- Paralympic: 5-a-side since 2004 and 7-a-side from 1984 to 2016

Minifootball (sometimes spelled mini-football and called minifoot) is a small-sided variation of association football. Minifootball is played with a reduced field of play and the number of players. The most prominent variants of minifootball are the 5-a-side, 6-a-side (common in Socca and the WMF-sanctioned minifootball), 7-a-side, 8-a-side formats and indoor football. All games are played on football pitch (artificial turf on Socca), in contrast to futsal which is played on a hard court indoors. Minifootball is open to both professional and amateur players and has grown in popularity globally.

Minifootball is an informal game with flexible rules, often determined before play begins. There have been many governing bodies that sanctions the more official and formal variations of minifootball, including the WMF and ISF. The WMF organizes its own 6-a-side World Cup every 2 years, as well as continental championships through established national federations. Variations of minifootball for athletes with a physical disability are also played, with blind football and CP football are the most prominent versions.

== Variants ==
While minifootball is played informally, there have been many official and more formal variants of minifootball with pre-exisiting rules.

=== WMF-sanctioned minifootball ===
The WMF-sanctioned version of minifootball is played on football pitch with the length of the touchline in the range of 46–50 m (151–164 ft), and the goalline in the range of 26–30 m (85–98 ft) for an international match.

A match consists of two 25-minute halves. The length of either half is extended to allow penalty kicks to be taken. The interval between the two halves cannot exceed 10 minutes.

Yellow card is used to caution players over their action, while red card sends the offending player to the penalty box for 5 minutes.

==== Main competitions ====
- WMF World Cup
- WMF Continental Cup
- EMF EURO
- African Minifootball Cup
- Asian Mini Football Championship
- Panamerican Minifootball Cup

=== Socca ===
Socca is a variation of minifootball similar to the WMF-sanctioned version with different rules; Socca is played on artificial turf with larger field of play (60 m × 35 m (197 ft × 115 ft) maximum) and different pitch markings. A match consists of two 20-minute halves with a 5-minute break, which is shorter from the WMF-sanctioned minifootball.

=== Indoor ===
Minifootball is also played in indoor arenas with rules that vary between governing bodies; the WMF-sanctioned minifootball allows to play in indoor arenas, while other variations are also played.

In North America, the indoor football is typically played with six-a-side teams on an ice hockey-sized pitch with artificial turf floors.

==== Jorkyball ====
Jorkyball is an indoor-oriented variant of 2-a-side football played in a parallelepiped 10 m × 5 m (33 ft × 16 ft) cage on artificial turf with small goal.

=== The Football Association ===
The English FA have drawn up a full list of laws for the small-sided game which expands upon the rules outlined above and includes minimum/maximum pitch dimensions as well as technicalities on free-kicks and other parts of the game. Many of these laws follow upon that of traditional football, however there certainly exist some key differences. One of these being the disallowance for outfielders to enter either Penalty Area. If an attacking outfielder enters the opposing penalty area, whether with the intent to score or not, a referee will stop the game and restart play with the defending goalkeeper. Additionally if a defending outfielder enters their own penalty area, the defending team will be penalized by the opposing team being awarded a free kick. While headers are allowed in play, the Head Height rule prevents the ball from being passed or shot above the head. The height is typically determined by the height of the tallest person on the field, but is not set in stone and ultimately up to referee/officiator determination. If the referee determines the ball has been passed or kicked over head height, a free kick will be awarded against the offending player. An exception is to be made if the ball reaches this height after being hit off of a goalpost or being thrown from a goalkeeper.

=== Youth-oriented variants ===
Several national governing bodies of association football have created their own variations of minifootball aimed for youth players.

==== Japan Football Association ====
In 2003, the Japan Football Association created an 8-a-side format designed for youth players, initially up to 10 and later up to 12 since 2011. The JFA-sanctioned 8-a-side format uses the modified Laws of the Game with flexible and youth-oriented changes that can be determined on competitions.

===== Players, equipment and officials =====
There are eight players on the field on each team, one of whom is the goalkeeper. The maximum number of substitutes allowed is eight, with unlimited substitutions during the match. Like in futsal, substitutes can come on even when the ball is in play, but the player coming off must leave the playing field first before the substitute can enter it. If a team has or is reduced to fewer than six players, the match is abandoned and counted as a loss for the team with the lack of players.

The kit is made up of a jersey or shirt with sleeves, shorts, socks, shin guards made out of metal, plastic or foam, and shoes with rubber soles. All players are allowed to wear glasses if the first referee approved it as "non-dangerous equipment".

Officiators can choose to control the game with or without assistant referees. If officiators choose to control the game by a single referee with no assistants, the referee should be assisted by an official whose duties are similar to the fourth official.

====== Ball ======
The ball must be the appropriate size for the playing age group. For under-12 matches, the Size 4 ball with a circumference of 63.5–66 cm (25.0–26.0 in) and a mass of 350–390 g (12–14 oz) is used.

====== Pitch ======
The field of play is usually in 68 m × 50 m (223 ft × 164 ft). The inner edges of the vertical goalposts must be 5 m (16 ft) apart, and the lower edge of the horizontal crossbar supported by the goalposts must be 2.5 m (8.2 ft) above the ground for under-12 matches.

In front of the goal is the penalty area. This area is marked by the goal line, two lines starting on the goal line 12 m (39 ft) from the goalposts and extending 12 m (39 ft) into the pitch perpendicular to the goal line, and a line joining them.

====== Duration and tie-breaking methods ======
A standard match consists of two equal periods in the range of 15-20 minutes and can be determined by age groups. The interval between the two halves cannot exceed 10 minutes. In some competitions, the three-period format is used, in which the attacking goal of each team switches at the middle of the third period.

In some competitions, a match cannot end in a draw. The extra time and penalties (penalty shoot-out) are the only two methods that can be used to determine the winner after a match has been drawn. Extra time consists of one period of five minutes. If no winner is produced after extra time, three kicks from the penalty mark are taken alternately by the two teams, and the team that has scored the most wins. If it is not decided after three kicks, it continues to go on with one extra kick from the penalty mark to each team at a time until one of them has scored more goals than the other. Unlike extra time, the goals scored in a shoot-out do not count towards the goals scored throughout the match.

====== Green card ======
For the JFA-sanctioned youth competitions up to under-12, including the 8-a-side format, a green card is used for a positive action.

===== Small-Sided Game Guidelines =====
In 2022, the JFA Small-Sided Game Guidelines (JFAスモールサイドゲーム ガイドライン) was created for preschoolers and elementary school students up to 4th grade.

The guideline uses reduced players, field of play, ball size and match length than the JFA-sanctioned 8-a-side format, and a limited playing time per day for each players. The match is controlled by pitch managers instead of referees, who cover most of the duties that are done by the referee and assistant referees in the 11-a-side format.

The JFA's Small-Sided Game Guidelines is divided into three age categories, preschoolers, 1st and 2nd grades, and 3rd and 4th grades.

Summary of rules
Age groups	Preschoolers (under-6)	1st and 2nd grades (under-8)	3rd and 4th grades (under-10)
Number of players	3 per side (without goalkeeper)	4 per side (without goalkeeper)	5 per side (with goalkeeper)
Length of the field	20 m × 10 m (66 ft × 33 ft)	25 m × 15 m (82 ft × 49 ft)	35 m × 25 m (115 ft × 82 ft)
Goal	Portable goal, 2 m × 1 m (6.6 ft × 3.3 ft)		Futsal goal, 3 m × 2 m (9.8 ft × 6.6 ft)
Penalty area	N/A		6 m × 15 m (20 ft × 49 ft)
Ball	Lightweight ball, same circumference as size 3 is recommended	Size 3, circumference 60–62 cm (24–24 in), weight between 280–310 g (9.9–10.9 oz)	Size 4, circumference 63.5–66 cm (25.0–26.0 in), weight between 350–390 g (12–14 oz)
Time	Two periods of 5 minutes		Two periods of 7 minutes
Maximum playing time per day	30 minutes	40 minutes	60 minutes
Restarting method(s)	Kick-in		Kick-in, occasionally throw-in
Restarting after goal	From goal line		
Goal kick	Kick-in, opponents must stand at least 3 metres (9.8 ft) from the ball		
Offside	No		

== See also ==
- Socca
- Five-a-side football
- Seven-a-side football
- Indoor soccer
- Jorkyball
- Beach soccer
- Paralympic football
- 3v3 Soccer
- Futsal
- FIFA U-15 World Cup & Festival
