= Australia men's national minifootball team =

Australia
- Association: Australian Minifootball Federation

First international
- Argentina 1–5 Australia (Nabeul, Tunisia; 7 October 2017)

Biggest win
- Australia 11–0 India (Perth, Australia; 3 October 2019)

Biggest defeat
- Australia 0–6 Romania (Perth, Australia; 9 October 2019)

World Cup
- Appearances: 2 (first in 2017)
- Best result: Quarter-finals, 2017, 2019

The Australia men's national minifootball team represents Australia in men's international minifootball competitions and is controlled by the Australian Minifootball Federation, the governing body of minifootball in Australia. Australia has competed in two WMF World Cups in 2017 and hosted the 2019 edition finishing at the quarter-finals on both occasions.

== History ==
Australia entered the WMF World Cup for the first time in 2017, drawing in Group A with the Czech Republic, France, and Argentina. On 7 October 2017, Australia played their first match with a 5–1 win against Argentina and advanced to the knockout stage with a 5–1 loss against the Czech Republic, and a 3–3 draw against France. Australia won 4–3 on penalties after a 3–3 draw against Bosina and Herzegovina in the Round of 16, and ultimately being knocked out at the quarter-finals after a 4–3 loss to Spain.

On 16 July 2018, Australia won the rights to host the 2019 WMF World Cup over a majority vote against Kazakhstan. In the tournament, Australia won all three matches in the group stage; 4–0 against Thailand, 11–0 against India, and 4–1 against Colombia. Australia won in the Round of 16 with a 2–1 against Saudi Arabia, but was knocked out at the quarter-finals in a 6–0 loss to Romania; their biggest defeat.

== Results and fixtures ==
=== 2017 ===
7 October 2017 WMF World Cup Group A	Argentina	1–5	Australia	Nabeul, Tunisia
16:30 UTC+1	Esteban Voight 29'	Report	Martin Middlehurst 3'; Shervin Adeli 28', 44'; Natham Sansom 37'; Jordan Ferrier 40'	Stadium: Nabeul Minifootball Stadium

9 October 2017 WMF World Cup Group A	Australia	1–5	Czech Republic	Nabeul, Tunisia
22:45 UTC+1	Shervin Adeli 27'	Report	Patrik Levčík 3'; František Hakl 5'; Michal Salák 16'; Stanislav Mařík 22'; Jakub Polák 38'	Stadium: Nabeul Minifootball Stadium

11 October 2017 WMF World Cup Group A	Australia	3–3	France	Nabeul, Tunisia
21:30 UTC+1	Tai Smith 10'; Shervin Adeli 33', 27' (pen.)	Report	Aurelien Jastier 7'; Wesley Liadé 26'; Omar Belbachir 44'	Stadium: Nabeul Minifootball Stadium

12 October 2017 WMF World Cup Round of 16	Australia	3–3 (a.e.t.) (4–3 p)	Bosnia and Herzegovina	Nabeul, Tunisia
	Shervin Adeli 6', 19', 57'	Report	Goran Lovrinovic 23' (pen.); Marko Vujica 27'; Kristijan Pantić 58'	Stadium: Nabeul Minifootball Stadium
	Penalties
	Shervin Adeli (penalty scored); Tai Smith (penalty scored); Matthew West (penalty scored); Jordan Ferrier (penalty scored)		(penalty scored) Goran Lovrinovic; (penalty scored) Marin Jukić; (penalty scored) Marko Vujica; (penalty missed) Kristijan Pantić

13 October 2017 WMF World Cup Quarter-finals	Spain	4–3	Australia	Nabeul, Tunisia
	Vincente Zaragoza 18', 54'; Francisco Castaño 27', 43'	Report	Jordan Ferrier 31'; Shervin Adeli 37'; Tai Smith 49'	Stadium: Nabeul Minifootball Stadium

=== 2019 ===
1 October 2019 WMF World Cup Group A	Australia	4–0	Thailand	Perth, Australia
19:30 UTC+8	Chris Payne 7', 8'; Predraj Bojic 13'; Jake Harris 28'	Report		Stadium: Perth Minifoot Stadium

3 October 2019 WMF World Cup Group A	Australia	11–0	India	Perth, Australia
19:00 UTC+8	Amaury Gauthier 13', 30', 34'; Joshua Swadling 13'; George Harle 27'; Chris Payne 29'; Hussein Akil 36'; Marc Warren 41'; Adolph Koudakpo 47', 49'; Brad Bartels 48'	Report		Stadium: Perth Minifoot Stadium

5 October 2019 WMF World Cup Group A	Australia	4–1	Colombia	Perth, Australia
19:00 UTC+8	Joe Fox 4'; Chris Payne 10', 25', 35'	Report	José Zúñiga 43'	Stadium: Perth Minifoot Stadium

8 October 2019 WMF World Cup Round of 16	Australia	2–1	Saudi Arabia	Perth, Australia
17:30 UTC+8	Chris Payne 3', 26'	Report	Naif Alanazi 2'	Stadium: Perth Minifoot Stadium

9 October 2019 WMF World Cup Quarter-finals	Australia	0–6	Romania	Perth, Australia
19:00 UTC+8		Report	Stelian Stancu 4'; Mircea Ciprian Ungur 9', 33'; Toma Vincene 12'; Sebastian Petrisor Vasile 20'; Dragan Robert Paulevici 29'	Stadium: Perth Minifoot Stadium

== Competitive record ==
=== WMF World Cup ===
Winners Runners-up Third place Tournament hosted

WMF World Cup									Qualification						
Year	Host	Round	Pld	W	D	L	F	A	Pos.	Pld	W	D	L	F	A
2015	United States	Did not enter							No qualification phase						
2017	Tunisia	Quarter-finals	5	1	2	2	12	13	Invited						
2019	Australia	Quarter-finals	5	4	0	1	21	8	Qualified as hosts						
2023	United Arab Emirates	Did not enter							Did not enter						
2025	Azerbaijan	Did not enter							Did not enter						
Total		Quarter-finals	10	5	2	3	33	21							
