= 2019 WMF World Cup =

Minifootball tournament

Tournament details
- Host country: Australia
- Dates: 1–11 October
- Teams: 32 (from 5 confederations)
- Venue: 1 (in 1 host city)

Final positions
- Champions: Mexico (1st title)
- Runners-up: Brazil
- Third place: Romania
- Fourth place: Hungary

Tournament statistics
- Matches played: 64
- Goals scored: 415 (6.48 per match)
- Top scorer(s): (Czech Republic) Ondřej Paděra (10 goals)
- Best player: (Mexico) Moises Gonzalez
- Best goalkeeper: (Mexico) Bernardo Valdovinos Solos

The 2019 WMF World Cup was the third edition of the WMF World Cup, the biennial world championship for national minifootball teams organized by the World Minifootball Federation (WMF). The tournament was contested in Perth in Australia between 1 and 11 October 2019. The tournament has been expanded by increasing the number of participating teams to 32. Czech Republic are the defending champions. Mexico two times runner-up defeated Brazil 4–0 in the final, to win the title.

== Venue ==
Australia was awarded the right to host the event on 27 June 2018. All the matches are played at the Perth Minifoot Stadium in Langley Park in Perth.

Perth
Perth Minifoot Stadium
Capacity: 5,000

== Teams ==
=== Participating nations ===
Team	Finals appearance	First appearance	Last appearance	Previous best performance
Afghanistan	1st	None	None	Debut
Argentina	2nd	2017	2017	Group stage (2017)
Australia (Host)	2nd	2017	2017	Quarter-finals (2017)
Brazil	3rd	2015	2017	Third place (2015)
Chile	2nd	2017	2017	Round of 16 (2017)
Colombia	1st	None	None	Debut
Costa Rica	1st	None	None	Debut
Czech Republic (Holders)	3rd	2015	2017	Champions (2017)
England	1st	None	None	Debut
Ghana	1st	None	None	Debut
Guatemala	2nd	2017	2017	Group stage (2017)
Hungary	2nd	2017	2017	Quarter-finals (2017)
India	3rd	2015	2017	Group stage (2015, 2017)
Iraq	2nd	2017	2017	Group stage (2017)
Japan	1st	None	None	Debut
Lebanon	2nd	2017	2017	Group stage (2017)
Mexico	3rd	2015	2017	Runners-up (2015, 2017)
Moldova	1st	None	None	Debut
Nigeria	1st	None	None	Debut
Portugal	2nd	2017	2017	Group stage (2017)
Romania	3rd	2015	2017	Third place (2015)
Saudi Arabia	1st	None	None	Debut
Serbia	2nd	2015	2015	Group stage (2015)
Singapore	1st	None	None	Debut
Slovakia	1st	None	None	Debut
Somalia	2nd	2017	2017	Group stage (2017)
South Africa	1st	None	None	Debut
Switzerland	1st	None	None	Debut
Thailand	1st	None	None	Debut
Tunisia	2nd	2017	2017	Quarter-finals (2017)
Ukraine	1st	None	None	Debut
United States	3rd	2015	2017	Champions (2015)

=== Draw ===
On 7 June 2019, in Perth, the pools were drawn for 8 groups of 32 teams.

Pot 1	Pot 2	Pot 3	Pot 4
Australia (Host); Brazil; Czech Republic; Hungary; Mexico; Romania; Portugal; Tunisia	Chile; Afghanistan; Guatemala; Switzerland; Lebanon; Slovakia; United States; Colombia	Argentina; England; Iraq; India; Japan; Somalia; Serbia; Ukraine	Costa Rica; Ghana; Moldova; Nigeria; Saudi Arabia; Singapore; Thailand; South Africa

== Group stage ==
All times listed below are at local time (UTC+8)

=== Group A ===
Pos	Team	Pld	W	D	L	GF	GA	GD	Pts	Qualification
1	Australia (H)	3	3	0	0	19	1	+18	9	Advance to Knockout stage
2	Colombia	3	2	0	1	9	8	+1	6	Advance to Knockout stage
3	Thailand	3	1	0	2	5	10	−5	3	
4	India	3	0	0	3	2	16	−14	0	

Source: WMF
(H) Hosts
1 October 2019
11:00

Colombia	3–1	India
Jairo Andres Guzman Pulgarin 15'; Nicolas Hoyos 16'; Mateo Guevara 20'		Damanpreet Sukh Singh Heer 20'

Perth Minifoot Stadium, Perth
1 October 2019
19:30

Australia	4–0	Thailand
Chris Payne 7', 8'; Predraj Bojic 13'; Jake Harris 28'

Perth Minifoot Stadium, Perth

3 October 2019
11:30

Colombia	5–3	Thailand
José Zúñiga 2'; Ever Stevens Pino Meza 10'; Iván Arias 22'; Gustavo Girón 31', 45'		Thammanan Kawachart 7'; Kantapit Uachaiwiwat 21'; Pichai Jantamee 25'

Perth Minifoot Stadium, Perth
3 October 2019
19:00

Australia	11–0	India
Amaury Gauthier 13', 30', 34'; Joshua Swadling 13'; George Harle 27'; Chris Payne 29'; Hussein Akil 36'; Marc Warren 41'; Adolph Koudakpo 47', 49'; Brad Bartels 48'

Perth Minifoot Stadium, Perth

5 October 2019
11:30

India	1–2	Thailand
Damanpreet Sukh Singh Heer 38'		Thammanan Kawachart 7', 23'

Perth Minifoot Stadium, Perth
5 October 2019
19:00

Australia	4–1	Colombia
Joe Fox 4'; Chris Payne 10', 25', 35'		José Zúñiga 43'

Perth Minifoot Stadium, Perth

=== Group B ===
Pos	Team	Pld	W	D	L	GF	GA	GD	Pts	Qualification
1	Hungary	3	3	0	0	23	2	+21	9	Advance to Knockout stage
2	Saudi Arabia	3	1	1	1	14	8	+6	4	Advance to Knockout stage
3	Afghanistan	3	1	0	2	4	21	−17	3	
4	England	3	0	1	2	5	15	−10	1	

Source: WMF
1 October 2019
12:30

Hungary	4–2	Saudi Arabia
David Ladanyi 8', 33', 37'; Istvan Marko Sos 41'		Rashed Aldawsari 6', 43' (pen.)

Perth Minifoot Stadium, Perth
1 October 2019
17:00

Afghanistan	3–2	England
Jawad Rezaie 11', 35'; Hadi Hussain 47'		Tom Kennedy 11'; Jamie Gardiner 40'

Perth Minifoot Stadium, Perth

3 October 2019
13:00

Hungary	9–0	England
Zsolt Horvath 15'; David Ladanyi 15'; Tamas Seregy 24'; Istvan Marko Sos 28'; Mate Janos Suscsak 29'; Attila Fritz 32'; Richard Gregus 36', 42'; Miklos Barabas 50'

Perth Minifoot Stadium, Perth
3 October 2019
14:30

Afghanistan	1–9	Saudi Arabia
Jawad Rezaie 45'		Yahya Farasan 26', 33', 36'; Fahad Rudayni 36'; Sami Alharbi 38'; Rashed Aldawsari 46', 50'; Naif Alanazi 47', 49'

Perth Minifoot Stadium, Perth

5 October 2019
13:00

Hungary	10–0	Afghanistan
Istvan Marko Sos 3'; Attila Fritz 6', 30'; Mate Janos Suscsak 10', 11'; Gergely Kovacs 31'; David Ladanyi 32', 39'; Richard Gregus 34'; Miklos Barabas 40'

Perth Minifoot Stadium, Perth
5 October 2019
17:30

England	3–3	Saudi Arabia
Jack Rycroft 7'; Danny Hodgson 19'; Ben Reynolds 32'		Sayil Alotaibi 16', 39'; Sami Alharbi 38'

Perth Minifoot Stadium, Perth

=== Group C ===
Pos	Team	Pld	W	D	L	GF	GA	GD	Pts	Qualification
1	Romania	3	3	0	0	15	2	+13	9	Advance to Knockout stage
2	Ukraine	3	2	0	1	12	5	+7	6	Advance to Knockout stage
3	Lebanon	3	1	0	2	9	6	+3	3	
4	Nigeria	3	0	0	3	3	26	−23	0	

Source: WMF
1 October 2019
15:30

Romania	10–0	Nigeria
Stelian Stancu 2', 4', 34', 49'; Ioan Mircea Popa 28', 45'; Razvan Alexandru Plopeanu 36', 39', 48'; Dragan Robert Paulevici 41'

Perth Minifoot Stadium, Perth
1 October 2019
21:00

Lebanon	0–3	Ukraine
		Andrei Khomin 15'; Viktor Tsoi 34'; Yevhen Zadorozhnii 45'

Perth Minifoot Stadium, Perth

3 October 2019
17:30

Lebanon	8–1	Nigeria
Ali Fakih 1', 11', 32'; Hassan Younes 3'; Ibrahim Rammal 6', 19'; Kassem Ezzedine 12'; Khaled Elejel 40'		Abraham Obafemi Martins Awosanya 45'

Perth Minifoot Stadium, Perth
3 October 2019
20:30

Romania	3–1	Ukraine
Ionut Traian Alecu 1'; Mircea Ciprian Ungur 5'; Dragan Robert Paulevici 26'		Viktor Panteleichuk 38'

Perth Minifoot Stadium, Perth

5 October 2019
16:00

Romania	2–1	Lebanon
Andrei Cosmin Balea 24'; Mircea Ciprian Ungur 49'		Khaled Elejel 13'

Perth Minifoot Stadium, Perth
5 October 2019
20:30

Ukraine	8–2	Nigeria
Viktor Panteleichuk 1'; Andrei Khomin 2'; Yevhenii Zaiets 6', 24'; Vitalii Kharchenko 9', 33'; Yevhen Zadorozhnii 15'; Viktor Tsoi 25'		Ismail Hajimohamed 12'; Rama Kabwe 17'

Perth Minifoot Stadium, Perth

=== Group D ===
Pos	Team	Pld	W	D	L	GF	GA	GD	Pts	Qualification
1	Ghana	3	3	0	0	15	3	+12	9	Advance to Knockout stage
2	Guatemala	3	2	0	1	9	8	+1	6	Advance to Knockout stage
3	Iraq	3	1	0	2	8	6	+2	3	
4	Portugal	3	0	0	3	0	15	−15	0	Eliminated

Source: WMF
- Note: Portugal had a player with a professional contract playing in Association football, which is not allowed by the rules. Therefore, all of Portugal's matches were nullified 0–5 in favor of the opponent.
1 October 2019
9:30

Guatemala	3–1	Iraq
Roberto Morales 22', 39'; Michael Mendez 42'		Karrar Muhsin Al Bunajim 47'

Perth Minifoot Stadium, Perth
1 October 2019
14:00

Portugal	2–2 (Cancelled) 0–5 (Awarded)	Ghana
Luccas Araujo de Mello 3'; Alessandro Basto 39'		Brian Koech 23'; Abdul Razak Amadu 25'

Perth Minifoot Stadium, Perth

3 October 2019
10:00

Guatemala	1–7	Ghana
Michael Mendez 32'		Joshua Tumeo 5', 39'; Nicholas Anane 6', 26'; Emmanuel Kankpeyeng 15'; Mordecai Appiah 27'; Michael Mendez 31' (o.g.)

Perth Minifoot Stadium, Perth
3 October 2019
16:00

Portugal	4–2 (Cancelled) 0–5 (Awarded)	Iraq
Luccas Araujo de Mello 7'; Miguel De Oliveira 10'; Brandon De Abreu 13'; Jesse Lazzaro 17'		Mahdi Rabei 34'; Basheer Abdel Hakim Mohamad 50'

Perth Minifoot Stadium, Perth

5 October 2019
10:00

Portugal	1–0 (Cancelled) 0–5 (Awarded)	Guatemala
Jesse Lazzaro 12'

Perth Minifoot Stadium, Perth
5 October 2019
14:30

Iraq	2–3	Ghana
Karar Saad Al-Asadi 16'; Hassan Elyassiri 26'		Emmanuel Kankpeyeng 35'; Karar Saad Al-Asadi 37' (o.g.); Mordecai Appiah 38'

Perth Minifoot Stadium, Perth

=== Group E ===
Pos	Team	Pld	W	D	L	GF	GA	GD	Pts	Qualification
1	Mexico	3	3	0	0	26	2	+24	9	Advance to Knockout stage
2	Moldova	3	2	0	1	14	5	+9	6	Advance to Knockout stage
3	Switzerland	3	1	0	2	7	23	−16	3	
4	Somalia	3	0	0	3	4	21	−17	0	

Source: WMF
2 October 2019
13:00

Mexico	4–0	Moldova
Hiram Ruiz 15'; Moises Gonzalez 22', 38'; Edgar Gonzalez Diaz 36'

Perth Minifoot Stadium, Perth
2 October 2019
14:30

Switzerland	6–2	Somalia
Sebastian Bernhard 5'; Luca Schmiedgen 6'; Felim Rugel 25', 37'; Remo Capitani 35'; Patrick Guggisberg 50'		Abdullahi Osman 8'; Luqman Abdirahman 24'

Perth Minifoot Stadium, Perth

4 October 2019
11:30

Switzerland	1–10	Moldova
Arturo Schmiedgen 20'		Leonid Podlesnov 8', 16', 37', 44'; Victor Negara 12'; Alexandru Popovici 39'; Serghei Nudnîi 40', 47'; Stanislav Luca 44'; Victor Iordachi 46'

Perth Minifoot Stadium, Perth
4 October 2019
14:30

Mexico	11–2	Somalia
Luis Ortega 1', 15'; Edgar Gonzalez Diaz 5'; Daniel Villela 15'; Christian Gutierrez 16'; Moises Gonzalez 20', 21', 27'; Cesar Alejandro Cerda Herrera 23', 34'; Hiram Ruiz 40'		12'; Abdullahi Osman 39'

Perth Minifoot Stadium, Perth

6 October 2019
13:00

Mexico	11–0	Switzerland
Miguel Vaca Nuñez 11', 41'; Daniel Villela 12'; Luis Ortega 17', 33'; Ismael Rojo Martinez 19'; Hiram Ruiz 21'; Brandon Escoto 24'; Moises Gonzalez 36'; Cesar Alejandro Cerda Herrera 48'; Carlos Hernandez Martinez 50'

Perth Minifoot Stadium, Perth
6 October 2019
17:30

Somalia	0–4	Moldova
		Alexandru Popovici 6'; Oleg Sischin 18'; Ruslan Istrati 22'; Leonid Podlesnov 32'

Perth Minifoot Stadium, Perth

=== Group F ===
Pos	Team	Pld	W	D	L	GF	GA	GD	Pts	Qualification
1	Slovakia	3	2	1	0	11	1	+10	7	Advance to Knockout stage
2	Tunisia	3	1	2	0	9	1	+8	5	Advance to Knockout stage
3	Japan	3	0	2	1	6	12	−6	2	
4	Costa Rica	3	0	1	2	6	18	−12	1	

Source: WMF
2 October 2019
11:30

Tunisia	8–0	Costa Rica
Chbil Tayeb 5'; Ben Taleb Mohamed Ali 6', 8'; Omar Nasri 27', 34'; Karim Mrad 28'; Skander Loumi 41'; Riahi Makram 46'

Perth Minifoot Stadium, Perth
2 October 2019
20:30

Slovakia	6–0	Japan
Jaroslav Repa 8'; Pavol Gere 11'; Martin Ďuráči 12'; Adrián Hricov 15'; Rudolf Beliš 43', 45'

Perth Minifoot Stadium, Perth

4 October 2019
16:00

Tunisia	0–0	Japan

Perth Minifoot Stadium, Perth
6 October 2019
10:00

Japan	6–6	Costa Rica
Iki Kobayashi 8'; Jason Bermudez 22' (o.g.); Keisuke Muroi 26', 47', 48', 50'		Carlos Hernandez 17', 26', 27'; Alejandro Carrillo 31'; Luis Ruiz 33', 41'

Perth Minifoot Stadium, Perth

6 October 2019
20:30

Tunisia	1–1	Slovakia
Filip Deket 41' (o.g.)		Martin Ďuráči 8'

Perth Minifoot Stadium, Perth
7 October 2019
20:30

Slovakia	4–0	Costa Rica
Jaroslav Repa 10'; Pavol Gere 18'; Rudolf Beliš 24'; Ján Andrejko 34'

Perth Minifoot Stadium, Perth

=== Group G ===
Pos	Team	Pld	W	D	L	GF	GA	GD	Pts	Qualification
1	Czech Republic	3	3	0	0	28	2	+26	9	Advance to Knockout stage
2	Serbia	3	2	0	1	11	4	+7	6	Advance to Knockout stage
3	Chile	3	1	0	2	6	11	−5	3	
4	Singapore	3	0	0	3	1	29	−28	0	

Source: WMF
2 October 2019
17:30

Chile	0–3	Serbia
		Ivan Štokić 11'; Milan Čičić 47'; Veselin Guberinić 50'

Perth Minifoot Stadium, Perth
2 October 2019
19:00

Czech Republic	17–0	Singapore
Patrik Levčík 2'; Jan Koudelka 5', 43'; Ondřej Paděra 11', 16', 26', 33'; Richard Svoboda 13', 19'; Tomáš Jelínek 25', 29'; David Pozníček 35'; Bohumír Doubravský 40', 45'; Pavel Šultes 41', 49'; Stanislav Mařík 49'

Perth Minifoot Stadium, Perth

4 October 2019
13:00

Chile	6–1	Singapore
Andres Rivera 7', 16', 41'; David Araya 10'; Laurence Shuruma 28'; Asher Nelson 32'		Mathew Shiva Sinivasan 3'

Perth Minifoot Stadium, Perth
6 October 2019
16:00

Serbia	6–0	Singapore
Veselin Guberinić 12'; Čedomir Tomčić 19', 31'; Nemanja Crnoglavac 33'; Ivan Štokić 45', 49'

Perth Minifoot Stadium, Perth

6 October 2019
19:00

Czech Republic	7–0	Chile
Jan Koudelka 7'; Ondřej Paděra 13'; Stanislav Mařík 14'; David Pozníček 36'; David Presl 43'; Patrik Levčík 44'; Richard Svoboda 45'

Perth Minifoot Stadium, Perth
7 October 2019
19:00

Czech Republic	4–2	Serbia
Ondřej Paděra 6', 27'; Jan Koudelka 44' (pen.); Pavel Šultes 46'		Lazar Letić 24'; Čedomir Tomčić 27'

Perth Minifoot Stadium, Perth

=== Group H ===
Pos	Team	Pld	W	D	L	GF	GA	GD	Pts	Qualification
1	Brazil	3	3	0	0	19	3	+16	9	Advance to Knockout stage
2	United States	3	2	0	1	11	3	+8	6	Advance to Knockout stage
3	South Africa	3	1	0	2	6	12	−6	3	
4	Argentina	3	0	0	3	3	21	−18	0	

Source: WMF
2 October 2019
10:00

United States	8–0	Argentina
Israel Sesay 10'; Taylor Bond 17'; Slavisa Ubiparipovic 18', 47'; Jermaine Jones 22'; Kraig Chiles 28'; Gordy Gurson 32'; VcMor Eligwe 49'

Perth Minifoot Stadium, Perth
2 October 2019
16:00

Brazil	7–2	South Africa
Leonardo Cardoso 14', 24'; Rafael Sixel 22', 46'; Ricardo Gomes dos Santos de Carvalho 29'; Henrique Wruck Garcia Rocha 36'; Luan Silva 42'		Rafique Hassim 4'; Andre Alem Da Silva 40'

Perth Minifoot Stadium, Perth

4 October 2019
10:00

United States	3–1	South Africa
Franck Tayou 12', 29'; Brian Farber 43'		Jason Pottier 48'

Perth Minifoot Stadium, Perth
6 October 2019
11:30

Brazil	2–0	United States
Rafael Sixel 1'; Leonardo Cardoso 46'

Perth Minifoot Stadium, Perth

6 October 2019
14:30

Argentina	2–3	South Africa
Lucas Agustín Farhat 29'; Jorge Sebastián Berkhan 40'		Kyle Jordaan 8'; Rafique Hassim 17' (pen.), 47'

Perth Minifoot Stadium, Perth
7 October 2019
17:30

Brazil	10–1	Argentina
Luan Silva 5'; Yuri Oliveira 8', 37', 37'; Pablo Da Silva 15'; Rafael Sixel 25'; Renan Dias Manini 35'; Gustavo Elia 39', 50'; Henrique Wruck Garcia Rocha 49'		Lucas Agustín Farhat 36'

Perth Minifoot Stadium, Perth

== Knockout stage ==
=== Bracket ===
Round of 16
8 October – Perth
Australia	2
Saudi Arabia	1
8 October – Perth
Romania	10
Guatemala	0
8 October – Perth
Mexico	7
Tunisia	0
8 October – Perth
Czech Republic	5
United States	4
8 October – Perth
Hungary	22
Colombia	0
8 October – Perth
Ghana	0
Ukraine	8
8 October – Perth
Slovakia (p)	3 (4)
Moldova	3 (3)
8 October – Perth
Brazil	3
Serbia	2

Quarter-finals
9 October – Perth
Australia	0
Romania	6
9 October – Perth
Mexico	2
Czech Republic	1
9 October – Perth
Hungary	3
Ukraine	0
9 October – Perth
Slovakia	1
Brazil	2

Semi-finals
10 October – Perth
Romania	1
Mexico (a.e.t.)	2
10 October – Perth
Hungary	1
Brazil	2

Final
11 October – Perth
Mexico	4
Brazil	0
Third place
11 October – Perth
Romania (p)	0 (3)
Hungary	0 (1)

=== Round of 16 ===
8 October 2019
10:00

Ghana	0–8	Ukraine
		Viktor Tsoi 3'; Vitalii Kharchenko 4', 46'; Yevhen Andrienko 6'; Andrii Khomyn 7', 24', 45'; Yevhenii Zaiets 35'

Perth Minifoot Stadium, Perth

8 October 2019
11:30

Romania	10–0	Guatemala
Razvan Alexandru Plopeanu 3'; Toma Vincene 7', 31'; Mircea Ciprian Ungur 9'; Lester Giovani González Castro 13' (o.g.); Sebastian Petrisor Vasile 22'; Stelian Stancu 25' (pen.); Andrei Cosmin Balea 26'; Luis Rosales 38' (o.g.); Laszlo Klein 47'

Perth Minifoot Stadium, Perth

8 October 2019
13:00

Hungary	22–0	Colombia
Tamas Seregy 4', 13', 14'; Miklos Barabas 10', 11', 17', 22', 23' 24', 28'; Mark Egeto 23'; Attila Fritz 27', 46'; Istvan Marko Sos 28', 48'; David Ladanyi 29', 37', 44'; Mate Janos Suscsak 31', 32', 41'; Viktor Tornyai 45'

Perth Minifoot Stadium, Perth

8 October 2019
14:30

Brazil	3–2	Serbia
Rafael Sixel 17'; Luan Silva 34'; Ricardo Gomes dos Santos de Carvalho 38'		Nebojša Desnica 12'; Rafael Sixel 32' (o.g.)

Perth Minifoot Stadium, Perth

8 October 2019
16:00

Mexico	7–0	Tunisia
Miguel Vaca Nuñez 9'; Brandon Escoto 15'; Carlos Hernandez Martinez 17', 46'; Edgar Gonzalez Diaz 35'; Hiram Ruiz 37'; Christian Gutierrez 47'

Perth Minifoot Stadium, Perth

8 October 2019
17:30

Australia	2–1	Saudi Arabia
Chris Payne 3', 26'		Naif Alanazi 2'

Perth Minifoot Stadium, Perth

8 October 2019
19:00

Slovakia	3–3	Moldova
Jaroslav Repa 13'; Martin Ďuráči 33'; Tomáš Mikluš 37'		Stanislav Luca 25'; Oleg Sischin 40'; Denis Rassulov 49'
Penalties
Dušan Dzíbela (penalty scored); Filip Deket (penalty missed); Ivan Buchel (penalty scored); Juraj Kuhajdík (penalty scored); Pavol Gere (penalty scored)	4–3	(penalty missed) Stanislav Luca; (penalty scored) Ghenadie Orbu; (penalty scored) Serghei Nudnîi; (penalty scored) Victor Iordachi; (penalty missed) Sergiu Munteanu

Perth Minifoot Stadium, Perth

8 October 2019
20:30

Czech Republic	5–4	United States
Jan Koudelka 25' (pen.); Tomáš Jelínek 27'; Ondřej Paděra 28', 32'; Bohumír Doubravský 31'		Franck Tayou 6'; Kraig Chiles 25'; Brian Farber 13', 37'

Perth Minifoot Stadium, Perth

=== Quarterfinals ===
9 October 2019
16:00

Hungary	3–0	Ukraine
Tamas Seregy 7'; Richard Gregus 38'; Gergely Kovacs 51'

Perth Minifoot Stadium, Perth

9 October 2019
17:30

Slovakia	1–2	Brazil
Adrián Hricov 35'		Luan Silva 15'; Ricardo Gomes dos Santos de Carvalho 26'

Perth Minifoot Stadium, Perth

9 October 2019
19:00

Australia	0–6	Romania
Stelian Stancu 4'; Mircea Ciprian Ungur 9', 33'; Toma Vincene 12'; Sebastian Petrisor Vasile 20'; Dragan Robert Paulevici 29'

Perth Minifoot Stadium, Perth

9 October 2019
20:30

Mexico	2–1	Czech Republic
Moises Gonzalez 20'; Miguel Vaca Nuñez 47'		Ondřej Paděra 34'

Perth Minifoot Stadium, Perth

=== Semifinals ===
10 October 2019
17:00

Hungary	1–2	Brazil
Miklos Barabas 9'		Ricardo Gomes dos Santos de Carvalho 28'; Viktor Tornyai 35' (o.g.)

Perth Minifoot Stadium, Perth

10 October 2019
19:00

Romania	1–2 (a.e.t.)	Mexico
Mircea Ciprian Ungur 41'		Edgar Gonzalez Diaz 28'; Miguel Vaca Nuñez 56'

Perth Minifoot Stadium, Perth

=== Third-place match ===
11 October 2019
17:00

Romania	0–0	Hungary
Penalties
Mircea Ciprian Ungur (penalty scored); Razvan-Alexandru Plopeanu (penalty scored); Ionut Traian Alecu (penalty scored)	3–1	(penalty missed) Attila Fritz; (penalty scored) Istvan Marko Sos

Perth Minifoot Stadium, Perth

=== Final ===
11 October 2019
19:00

Mexico	4–0	Brazil
Moises Gonzalez 10'; Christian Gutierrez 47'; Hiram Ruiz 50', 53'

Perth Minifoot Stadium, Perth

== Awards ==
The following awards were given at the conclusion of the tournament:

Best Player
(Mexico) Moises Gonzalez
Top Scorer
(Czech Republic) Ondřej Paděra
(10 goals)
Best goalkeeper
(Mexico) Bernardo Valdovinos Solos
