= Langley Park, Perth =

Park in Perth, Western Australia

Langley Park
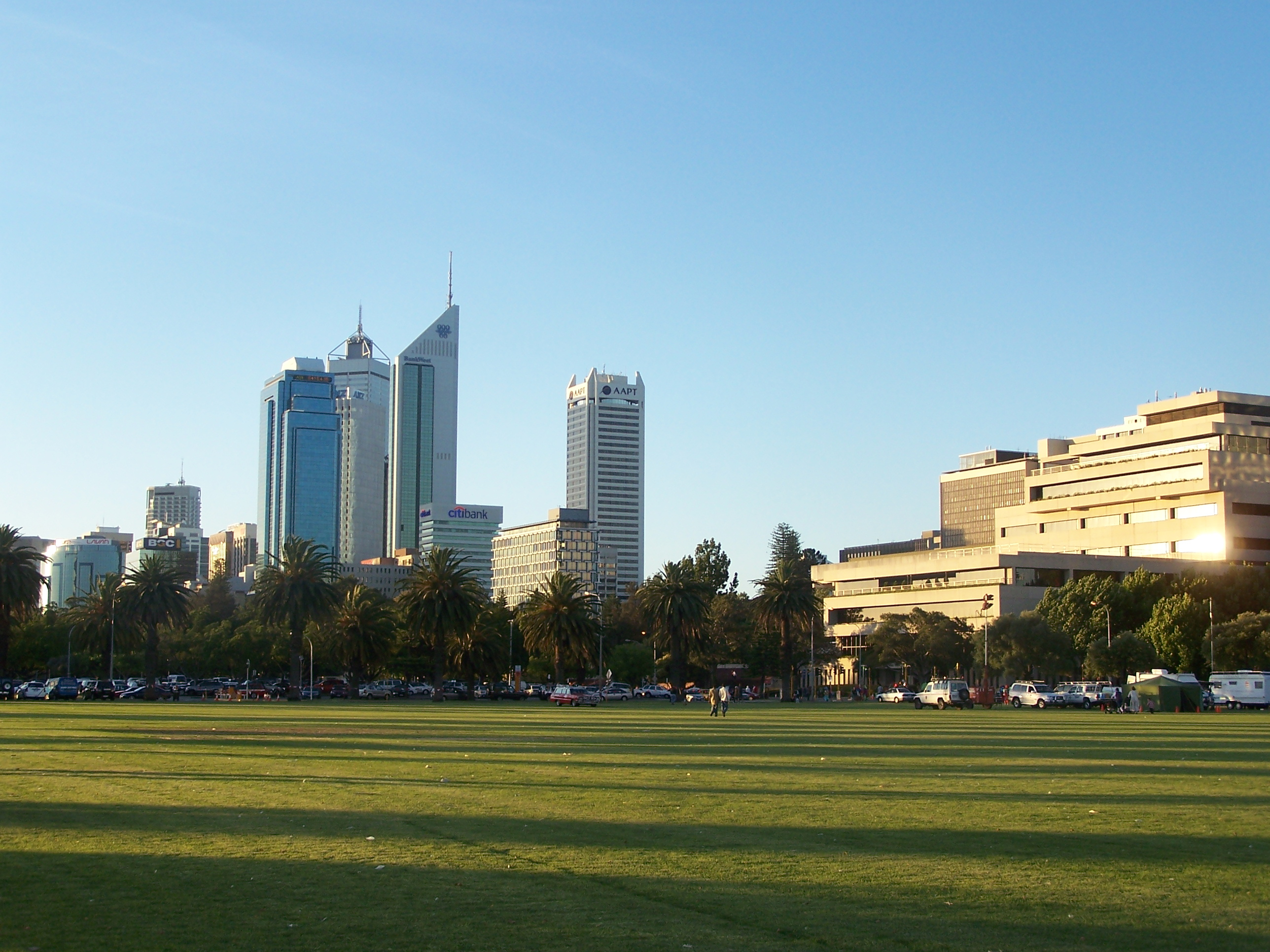
- Langley Park, looking across the western end towards the Perth CBD, circa 2006. The dominant building on the right is the Federal Law Courts, the gardens in front include Government House and Supreme Court Gardens
- Interactive map of the Langley Park area

General information
- Type: Park
- Location: Perth, Western Australia
- Coordinates: 31°57′41″S 115°52′8″E

Western Australia Heritage Register
- Type: State Registered Place
- Designated: 14 October 2011
- Reference no.: 3346

Langley Park is an open space in the central business district of Perth, Western Australia. Running alongside Riverside Drive, it is grassed, rectangular in shape and has approximate dimensions 900 by 100 metres (2,950 ft × 330 ft). It was created by reclaiming land from the adjacent Swan River between 1921 and 1935, to provide open space near the city.

As a pioneer of civil aviation in Western Australia, Major Norman Brearley used the park as an airstrip in the 1920s. That tradition continues with "fly-ins", where small aircraft land in the park. In 2003, to celebrate 100 years of powered flight, 10 aircraft – one representing each decade of the 20th century – landed. Aircraft have also used the park to perform emergency landings. In 1997 a Tiger Moth TMK had an engine failure and put down in the park. While not an official airfield, Langley Park makes Perth a place where fixed-wing aircraft can land in proximity to the central business district.

== Modern usage ==
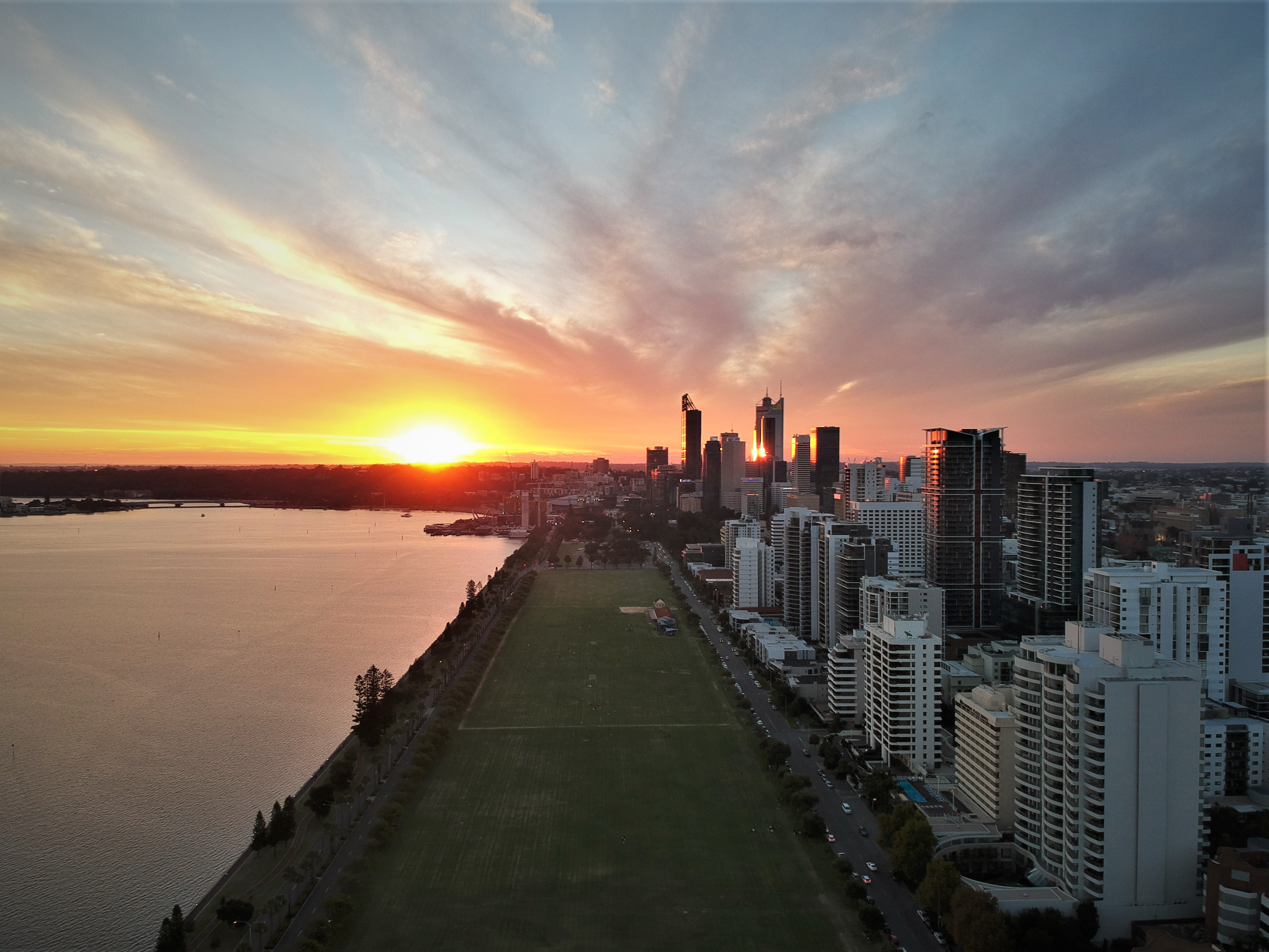
Langley Park at sunset

For many years, Langley Park's location made it a popular place to view the annual City of Perth Skyworks fireworks show on Australia Day, which were held over the river. After Skyworks' retirement in 2022, Langley Park has continued to host a smaller scale fireworks display and drone show as a replacement for the event.

The Telstra Rally Australia World Rally Championship held events at the park for 11 years from 1992 to 2002, and once more in 2005.

During November 2006, 2007 and 2008, the final stage of the Red Bull Air Race World Series was held over the Swan River and Perth Water, using Langley Park as the airfield.

Cirque du Soleil has used the park many times for its shows whenever a big top touring production visits Australia. Shows performed at Langley Park have included Saltimbanco, Alegria, Quidam, Dralion, and Ovo.

On 30 September 2018, the park was the site of the West Coast Eagles homecoming celebrations after winning the 2018 AFL Grand Final.

In 2019, Langley Park hosted the 2019 WMF World Cup.
