= 2017 WMF World Cup =

Minifootball tournament

كأس العالم لكرة القدم المصغرة 2017

Tournament details
- Host country: Tunisia
- Dates: 6–15 October
- Teams: 24 (from 5 confederations)
- Venue: 1 (in 1 host city)

Final positions
- Champions: Czech Republic (1st title)
- Runners-up: Mexico
- Third place: Senegal
- Fourth place: Spain

Tournament statistics
- Matches played: 52
- Goals scored: 260 (5 per match)
- Top scorer(s): (Spain) Francisco Castaño (10 goals)
- Best player: (Tunisia) Ouday Belhaj
- Best goalkeeper: (Senegal) Papa Samba Diallo

The 2017 WMF World Cup was the second edition of the WMF World Cup, the biennial world championship for national minifootball teams organized by the World Minifootball Federation (WMF). The tournament was contested in Nabeul in Tunisia between 6 and 15 October 2017. The tournament has been expanded by increasing the number of participating teams to 24. United States are the defending champions. Czech Republic defeated Mexico 3–0 in the final, to win the title.

== Venue ==
Tunisia was awarded the right to host the event on 27 August 2016. All the matches are played at the Nabeul Minifootball Stadium in Nabeul on the south coast of the Cape Bon. This stadium is temporary built to host the competition and is stripped down after the end of the event. The most prominent challenges and concerns of hosting was Islamic State insurgency in Tunisia.

Nabeul
Nabeul Minifootball Stadium
Capacity: 2,900

== Teams ==
=== Participating nations ===
Unlike in the 2015 WMF World Cup, 24 teams from 5 continents are qualified for the final tournament.

Team	Finals appearance	First appearance	Last appearance	Previous best performance
Argentina	1st	None	None	Debut
Australia	1st	None	None	Debut
Bosnia and Herzegovina	1st	None	None	Debut
Brazil	2nd	2015	2015	Third place (2015)
Chile	1st	None	None	Debut
Czech Republic	2nd	2015	2015	Quarter-finals (2015)
France	1st	None	None	Debut
Guatemala	1st	None	None	Debut
Hungary	1st	None	None	Debut
India	2nd	2015	2015	Group stage (2015)
Iraq	1st	None	None	Debut
Ivory Coast	1st	None	None	Debut
Kazakhstan	2nd	2015	2015	Group stage (2015)
Lebanon	1st	None	None	Debut
Libya	1st	None	None	Debut
Mexico	2nd	2015	2015	Runners-up (2015)
Portugal	1st	None	None	Debut
Romania	2nd	2015	2015	Third place (2015)
Russia	2nd	2015	2015	Group stage (2015)
Senegal	1st	None	None	Debut
Somalia	1st	None	None	Debut
Spain	1st	None	None	Debut
Tunisia (Host)	1st	None	None	Debut
United States (Holders)	2nd	2015	2015	Champions (2015)

=== Draw ===
On 11 June 2017, the Executive bureau of the World Minifootball Federation had unanimously decided in Brno, Czech Republic that the 2017 World Cup will be organized from 6 October to 16 October 2017. On 6 September 2017, The final draw for 2017 WMF World Cup was made in Tunis. For the draw, the 24 teams were divided into four seeding pots:

Pot 1	Pot 2	Pot 3	Pot 4
Tunisia (Host); Romania; Mexico; United States; Russia; Czech Republic	France; Hungary; Bosnia and Herzegovina; Spain; Kazakhstan; Portugal	Chile; Brazil; Senegal; Argentina; Libya; Ivory Coast	Australia; Somalia; Lebanon; Iraq; India; Guatemala

== Group stage ==
The winners and runners-up of each group and the best four third-placed teams advance to the round of 16. The rankings of teams in each group are determined as follows:

1. points obtained in all group matches;
2. goal difference in all group matches;
3. number of goals scored in all group matches;

If two or more teams are equal on the basis of the above three criteria, their rankings are determined as follows:

4. points obtained in the group matches between the teams concerned;
5. goal difference in the group matches between the teams concerned;
6. number of goals scored in the group matches between the teams concerned;
7. fair play points (first yellow card: minus 1 point; second yellow/indirect red card: minus 3 points; direct red card: minus 3 points; yellow card & direct red card: minus 4 points);
8. drawing of lots by the 2017 WMF World Cup Organising Committee.

All times listed below are at local time (UTC+1)

=== Group A ===
Pos	Team	Pld	W	D	L	GF	GA	GD	Pts	Qualification
1	Czech Republic	3	3	0	0	22	1	+21	9	Advance to Knockout stage
2	Australia	3	1	1	1	6	6	0	4	Advance to Knockout stage
3	France	3	1	1	1	3	7	−4	4	Advance to Knockout stage
4	Argentina	3	0	0	3	1	17	−16	0	

Source: WMF
7 October 2017
16:30

Argentina	1–5	Australia
Esteban Voight 29'		Martin Middlehurst 3'; Shervin Adeli 28', 44'; Natham Sansom 37'; Jordan Ferrier 40'

Nabeul Minifootball Stadium, Nabeul
7 October 2017
21:30

Czech Republic	7–0	France
František Hakl 9'; Romain Labaig 24' (o.g.); Michal Uhlíř 30'; Michal Salák 31'; Jan Koudelka 34', 48'; Ondřej Paděra 44'

Nabeul Minifootball Stadium, Nabeul

8 October 2017
20:15

France	3–0	Argentina
Elie Dohin 36'; Nicolas Huertos 48'; Omar Belbachir 48'

Nabeul Minifootball Stadium, Nabeul
9 October 2017
22:45

Australia	1–5	Czech Republic
Shervin Adeli 27'		Patrik Levčík 3'; František Hakl 5'; Michal Salák 16'; Stanislav Mařík 22'; Jakub Polák 38'

Nabeul Minifootball Stadium, Nabeul

11 October 2017
21:30

Australia	3–3	France
Tai Smith 10'; Shervin Adeli 33', 27' (pen.)		Aurelien Jastier 7'; Wesley Liadé 26'; Omar Belbachir 44'

Nabeul Minifootball Stadium, Nabeul
11 October 2017
22:45

Czech Republic	10–0	Argentina
Ondřej Paděra 4'; Michal Salák 12', 45'; Jakub Polák 15'; Daniel Kavka 28', 34'; Stanislav Mařík 33', 39'; František Hakl 40'; Jan Koudelka 50'

Nabeul Minifootball Stadium, Nabeul

=== Group B ===
Pos	Team	Pld	W	D	L	GF	GA	GD	Pts	Qualification
1	Mexico	3	3	0	0	7	1	+6	9	Advance to Knockout stage
2	Hungary	3	1	1	1	8	4	+4	4	Advance to Knockout stage
3	Chile	3	1	1	1	6	3	+3	4	Advance to Knockout stage
4	Iraq	3	0	0	3	0	13	−13	0	

Source: WMF
7 October 2017
19:00

Iraq	0–2	Mexico
		Christian Gutierrez 34'; Angel Curiel 47'

Nabeul Minifootball Stadium, Nabeul
8 October 2017
21:30

Chile	5–0	Iraq
Javier Quiroz 4'; Cristian Arredondo 7', 30'; Juan Carlos Muñoz 33', 39'

Nabeul Minifootball Stadium, Nabeul

8 October 2017
22:45

Mexico	3–1	Hungary
Christian Gutierrez 22'; Hiram Ruiz 27'; Angel Curiel 48'		Bence Bognár 35'

Nabeul Minifootball Stadium, Nabeul
9 October 2017
20:15

Hungary	1–1	Chile
Istvan Marko Sos 21' (pen.)		Cristian Arredondo 50'

Nabeul Minifootball Stadium, Nabeul

10 October 2017
21:30

Mexico	2–0	Chile
Christian Gutierrez 22'; Erick Tovar 27'

Nabeul Minifootball Stadium, Nabeul
11 October 2017
16:30

Iraq	0–6	Hungary
		Miklós Rajz 6'; Bence Bognár 9'; Richárd Cseszneki 38'; Imre Lak 40'; Attila Nagy 46', 49'

Nabeul Minifootball Stadium, Nabeul

=== Group C ===
Pos	Team	Pld	W	D	L	GF	GA	GD	Pts	Qualification
1	Russia	3	2	0	1	13	3	+10	6	Advance to Knockout stage
2	Bosnia and Herzegovina	3	2	0	1	11	5	+6	6	Advance to Knockout stage
3	Brazil	3	2	0	1	6	5	+1	6	Advance to Knockout stage
4	Somalia	3	0	0	3	4	21	−17	0	

Source: WMF
7 October 2017
17:45

Russia	1–2	Bosnia and Herzegovina
Erik Korchagin 2'		Andreas Berović 25'; Goran Lovrinovic 45' (pen.)

Nabeul Minifootball Stadium, Nabeul
8 October 2017
19:00

Brazil	3–2	Somalia
Everton Cestari 25'; Leonardo Cardoso 41' (pen.); Gustavo Elia 46'		Daod Dahir 18', 33'

Nabeul Minifootball Stadium, Nabeul

9 October 2017
14:15

Somalia	1–10	Russia
Mohamed Ali 14'		Aleksandr Kuksov 2', 13'; Alexei Medvedev 5', 24'; Erik Korchagin 17', 18'; Sergey Kharlamov 30'; Sergey Svezhentsev 31'; Marat Sadykov 36', 47'

Nabeul Minifootball Stadium, Nabeul
9 October 2017
19:00

Bosnia and Herzegovina	1–3	Brazil
Borislav Grbavac 35'		Ricardo De Maria Sobreira 36'; Gustavo Elia 44'; Thiago Coutinho 49'

Nabeul Minifootball Stadium, Nabeul

10 October 2017
22:45

Russia	2–0	Brazil
Ilnar Zhamaletdinov 19'; Kirill Svirodov 21'

Nabeul Minifootball Stadium, Nabeul
11 October 2017
14:00

Somalia	1–8	Bosnia and Herzegovina
Daod Dahir 9'		Borislav Grbavac 3'; Robert Milonović 12', 26'; Edin Mujezinovic 25', 31'; Marko Vujica 26'; Predrag Bekic 36'; Mirza Zahirovic 44'

Nabeul Minifootball Stadium, Nabeul

=== Group D ===
Pos	Team	Pld	W	D	L	GF	GA	GD	Pts	Qualification
1	Spain	3	3	0	0	20	6	+14	9	Advance to Knockout stage
2	Senegal	3	1	1	1	16	6	+10	4	Advance to Knockout stage
3	United States	3	1	1	1	13	7	+6	4	Advance to Knockout stage
4	India	3	0	0	3	0	30	−30	0	

Source: WMF
7 October 2017
20:15

United States	3–5	Spain
Franck Tayou 32', 52', 59'		Serji Codina 7'; Alváro Vidal 9'; Pablo García 34'; Francisco Castaño 35'; Vincente Zaragoza 52'

Nabeul Minifootball Stadium, Nabeul
8 October 2017
15:15

Senegal	11–0	India
Momo Cissé 6', 21', 28', 33', 36'; Moustapha Nam 20', 31', 32'; Niang Diop 25', 36'; Pape Mebillo 26'

Nabeul Minifootball Stadium, Nabeul

9 October 2017
16:45

United States	2–2	Senegal
Momo Cissé 29' (o.g.); Andy Reyes 45'		Moustapha Nam 49'; Momo Cissé 50+2' (pen.)

Nabeul Minifootball Stadium, Nabeul
10 October 2017
16:30

India	0–8	United States
		Franck Tayou 21', 24', 26', 39'; Andy Reyes 26', 40'; Israel Sesay 31'; Jordan 34'

Nabeul Minifootball Stadium, Nabeul

10 October 2017
19:00

Spain	4–3	Senegal
Francisco Castaño 9', 44'; Alváro Vidal 20'; Vicente Zaragoza 50+1'		Momo Cisse 21', 50+3' (pen.); Niang Diop 28'

Nabeul Minifootball Stadium, Nabeul
11 October 2017
19:00

India	0–11	Spain
		Francisco Castaño 2', 25', 44'; Alváro Vidal 15', 22'; March Tharky 19' (o.g.); Pablo García 25'; Xavi Poncél 26'; Juan Fernandéz 29', 37'; Alberto Velcon 33'

Nabeul Minifootball Stadium, Nabeul

=== Group E ===
Pos	Team	Pld	W	D	L	GF	GA	GD	Pts	Qualification
1	Romania	3	3	0	0	13	1	+12	9	Advance to Knockout stage
2	Kazakhstan	3	2	0	1	12	5	+7	6	Advance to Knockout stage
3	Ivory Coast	3	1	0	2	8	8	0	3	
4	Guatemala	3	0	0	3	2	21	−19	0	

Source: WMF
7 October 2017
22:45

Romania	2–1	Kazakhstan
Vincene Toma 35'; Gabriel Tanase 41'		Anuar Tokenov 33'

Nabeul Minifootball Stadium, Nabeul
8 October 2017
17:45

Guatemala	0–8	Romania
		Razvan Plopeanu 4'; Vincene Toma 10'; Cosmin Craciun 36'; Radu Burciu 37'; Marian Ionut 39', 42'; Robert Dragan Paulevici 43'; Claudiu Vlad 49'

Nabeul Minifootball Stadium, Nabeul

9 October 2017
16:30

Kazakhstan	4–2	Ivory Coast
Yerbol Suleimenov 5'; Alexander Bogomolov 7'; Murat Akhmetsharipov 31'; Jumogali Alibayev 45'		Diane Amara 23'; Donald Messako 29'

Nabeul Minifootball Stadium, Nabeul
10 October 2017
20:15

Romania	3–0	Ivory Coast
Vincene Toma 4'; Radu Burciu 10'; Razvan Plopeanu 47'

Nabeul Minifootball Stadium, Nabeul

11 October 2017
17:45

Ivory Coast	6–1	Guatemala
Zepherin Vovo Lago 4', 10' (pen.); Alain Eric Beugre 10'; Diane Amara 15', 20'; Donald Messako 23'		Christian De Leon 44'

Nabeul Minifootball Stadium, Nabeul
11 October 2017
12:45

Guatemala	1–7	Kazakhstan
Hugo Morales 4'		Kuanysh Abdualiyev 7', 47'; Alexander Bogomolov 25'; Yerbol Izekenov 28'; Murat Akhmetsharipov 35'; Mustafin Zhassulan 41'; Alin Assylzhan 48'

Nabeul Minifootball Stadium, Nabeul

=== Group F ===
Pos	Team	Pld	W	D	L	GF	GA	GD	Pts	Qualification
1	Tunisia (H)	3	2	1	0	11	5	+6	7	Advance to Knockout stage
2	Libya	3	1	2	0	4	2	+2	5	Advance to Knockout stage
3	Portugal	3	0	2	1	3	4	−1	2	
4	Lebanon	3	0	1	2	2	9	−7	1	

Source: WMF
(H) Hosts
6 October 2017
21:30

Tunisia	3–2	Portugal
Mohamed Azouni 1'; Ben Taleb Mohamed Ali 9'; Ouday Belhaj 13'		Joao Troncoso 18'; Bruno Tavares 50+4'

Nabeul Minifootball Stadium, Nabeul
8 October 2017
16:30

Libya	2–0	Lebanon
Akhila Salem 24'; Ali Chouchane 29'

Nabeul Minifootball Stadium, Nabeul

9 October 2017
21:30

Lebanon	1–6	Tunisia
Hassan Youness 32'		Mohamed Azouni 9', 28'; Ouday Belhaj 24', 27'; Hamza Firas Maiza 47'; Abdessattar Grissa 49'

Nabeul Minifootball Stadium, Nabeul
10 October 2017
17:45

Portugal	0–0	Libya

Nabeul Minifootball Stadium, Nabeul

11 October 2017
15:15

Lebanon	1–1	Portugal
Ahmad Daher 35'		Nuno Capela 33'

Nabeul Minifootball Stadium, Nabeul
11 October 2017
20:15

Tunisia	2–2	Libya
Mohamed Azouni 12'; Ouday Belhaj 13'		Ibrahim Ayman 27'; Fadel Zaki Sleik 29'

Nabeul Minifootball Stadium, Nabeul

=== Ranking of third-placed teams ===
Pos	Grp	Team	Pld	W	D	L	GF	GA	GD	Pts	Qualification
1	C	Brazil	3	1	1	1	3	7	−4	4	Advance to Knockout stage
2	D	United States	3	1	1	1	6	3	+3	4	Advance to Knockout stage
3	B	Chile	3	2	0	1	6	5	+1	6	Advance to Knockout stage
4	A	France	3	1	1	1	13	7	+6	4	Advance to Knockout stage
5	E	Ivory Coast	3	1	0	2	8	8	0	3	
6	F	Portugal	3	0	2	1	3	4	−1	2	

Source: WMF

== Knockout stage ==
=== Bracket ===
Round of 16
12 October – Nabeul
Romania	2 (1)
Senegal (p)	2 (3)
12 October – Nabeul
Russia	0 (1)
France (p)	0 (3)
12 October – Nabeul
Tunisia (p)	2 (4)
Kazakhstan	2 (3)
12 October – Nabeul
Mexico (a.e.t.)	4
United States	3
12 October – Nabeul
Spain (a.e.t.)	1
Chile	0
12 October – Nabeul
Australia (p)	3 (4)
Bosnia and Herzegovina	3 (3)
12 October – Nabeul
Hungary (a.e.t.)	3
Libya	2
12 October – Nabeul
Czech Republic	3
Brazil	1

Quarter-finals
13 October – Nabeul
Senegal	4
France	3
13 October – Nabeul
Tunisia	0
Mexico	7
13 October – Nabeul
Spain	4
Australia	3
13 October – Nabeul
Hungary	0
Czech Republic	1

Semi-finals
14 October – Nabeul
Senegal	1
Mexico	3
14 October – Nabeul
Spain	1
Czech Republic	3

Final
15 October – Nabeul
Czech Republic	3
Mexico	0
Third-place match
15 October – Nabeul
Senegal	5
Spain	0

=== Round of 16 ===
12 October 2017
12:30

Romania	2–2 (a.e.t.)	Senegal
Claudiu Vlad 31'; Adrian Calugareanu 50'		Abdoul Sega 4'; Moustapha Nam 27'
Penalties
Claudiu Vlad (penalty missed); Popa Ioan Mircea (penalty scored)	1–3	(penalty scored) Moustapha Nam; (penalty scored) Niang Diop; (penalty scored) Momo Cissé

Nabeul Minifootball Stadium, Nabeul

12 October 2017
14:00

Spain	1–0 (a.e.t.)	Chile
Francisco Castaño 51'

Nabeul Minifootball Stadium, Nabeul

12 October 2017
15:30

Mexico	4–3 (a.e.t.)	United States
Enrique Cañez 14', 46'; Christian Gutierrez 37', 52'		Gordy Gurson 5'; Andy Reyes 11'; Israel Sesay 26'

Nabeul Minifootball Stadium, Nabeul

12 October 2017
17:00

Russia	0–0 (a.e.t.)	France
Penalties
Evgenii Vashurin (penalty scored); Erik Korchagin (penalty missed)	1–3	(penalty scored) Omar Belbachir; (penalty scored) Bruno Meilhon; (penalty scored) Aurelien Jastier

Nabeul Minifootball Stadium, Nabeul

12 October 2017
18:30

Hungary	3–2 (a.e.t.)	Libya
Istvan Marko Sos 25'; Bence Bognár 49'; Bence Tajti 59'		Mohamed Albahli 30'; Ali Chouchane 34'

Nabeul Minifootball Stadium, Nabeul

12 October 2017
20:00

Australia	3–3 (a.e.t.)	Bosnia and Herzegovina
Shervin Adeli 6', 19', 57'		Goran Lovrinovic 23' (pen.); Marko Vujica 27'; Kristijan Pantić 58'
Penalties
Shervin Adeli (penalty scored); Tai Smith (penalty scored); Matthew West (penalty scored); Jordan Ferrier (penalty scored)	4–3	(penalty scored) Goran Lovrinovic; (penalty scored) Marin Jukić; (penalty scored) Marko Vujica; (penalty missed) Kristijan Pantić

Nabeul Minifootball Stadium, Nabeul

12 October 2017
21:30

Tunisia	2–2 (a.e.t.)	Kazakhstan
Mohamed Ali Karoula 24'; Bilel Ben Souda 50'		Kanat Zhumabekov 6'; Anuar Tokenov 54'
Penalties
Bilel Ben Souda (penalty scored); Abdessattar Grissa (penalty scored); Ben Taleb Mohamed Ali (penalty missed); Walid Nadzaul (penalty scored); Hassen Boudhina (penalty scored)	4–3	(penalty missed) Assan Barlybayev; (penalty scored) Anuar Tokenov; (penalty scored) Murat Akhmetsharipov; (penalty scored) Yerbol Izekenov; (penalty missed) Kanat Zhumabekov

Nabeul Minifootball Stadium, Nabeul

12 October 2017
23:00

Czech Republic	3–1	Brazil
Patrik Levčík 8'; Tomáš Kounovský 21'; Jan Koudelka 24'		Leonardo Cardoso 24'

Nabeul Minifootball Stadium, Nabeul

=== Quarterfinals ===
13 October 2017
18:15

Senegal	4–3	France
Momo Cissé 16'; Papa Ndiaye 23'; Niang Diop 32', 35'		Omar Belbachir 20', 34'; Momo Cissé 51' (o.g.)

Nabeul Minifootball Stadium, Nabeul

13 October 2017
19:45

Spain	4–3	Australia
Vincente Zaragoza 18', 54'; Francisco Castaño 27', 43'		Jordan Ferrier 31'; Shervin Adeli 37'; Tai Smith 49'

Nabeul Minifootball Stadium, Nabeul

13 October 2017
21:15

Tunisia	0–7	Mexico
		Hiram Ruiz 2', 36'; Hugo Rodriguez 7'; Eric Tovar 29'; Brandon Escoto 36'; Christian Gutierrez 39'; Luis Ortega 41'

Nabeul Minifootball Stadium, Nabeul

13 October 2017
22:45

Hungary	0–1	Czech Republic
		Patrik Levčík 36'

Nabeul Minifootball Stadium, Nabeul

=== Semifinals ===
14 October 2017
21:00

Senegal	1–3	Mexico
Niang Diop 7'		Brandon Escoto 12'; Bogar Moreno 30'; Christian Gutierrez 39'

Nabeul Minifootball Stadium, Nabeul

14 October 2017
22:30

Spain	1–3	Czech Republic
Francisco Castaño 15'		Stanislav Mařík 8'; Ondřej Paděra 35'; Tomáš Kounovský 42'

Nabeul Minifootball Stadium, Nabeul

=== Third-place match ===
15 October 2017
17:00

Senegal	5–0	Spain
Moustapha Nam 25', 41', 46'; Abdoul Sega 38'; Mohamed Diop 49'

Nabeul Minifootball Stadium, Nabeul

=== Final ===
15 October 2017
20:30

Czech Republic	3–0	Mexico
Jakub Polák 17'; Stanislav Mařík 26'; Ondřej Paděra 43'

Nabeul Minifootball Stadium, Nabeul

== Awards ==
The following awards were given at the conclusion of the tournament:

Best Player
(Tunisia) Ouday Belhaj
Top Scorer
(Spain) Francisco Castaño
(10 goals)
Best goalkeeper
(Senegal) Papa Samba Diallo
