= Nabeul =

Town in Tunisia

Nabeul نابل
- City
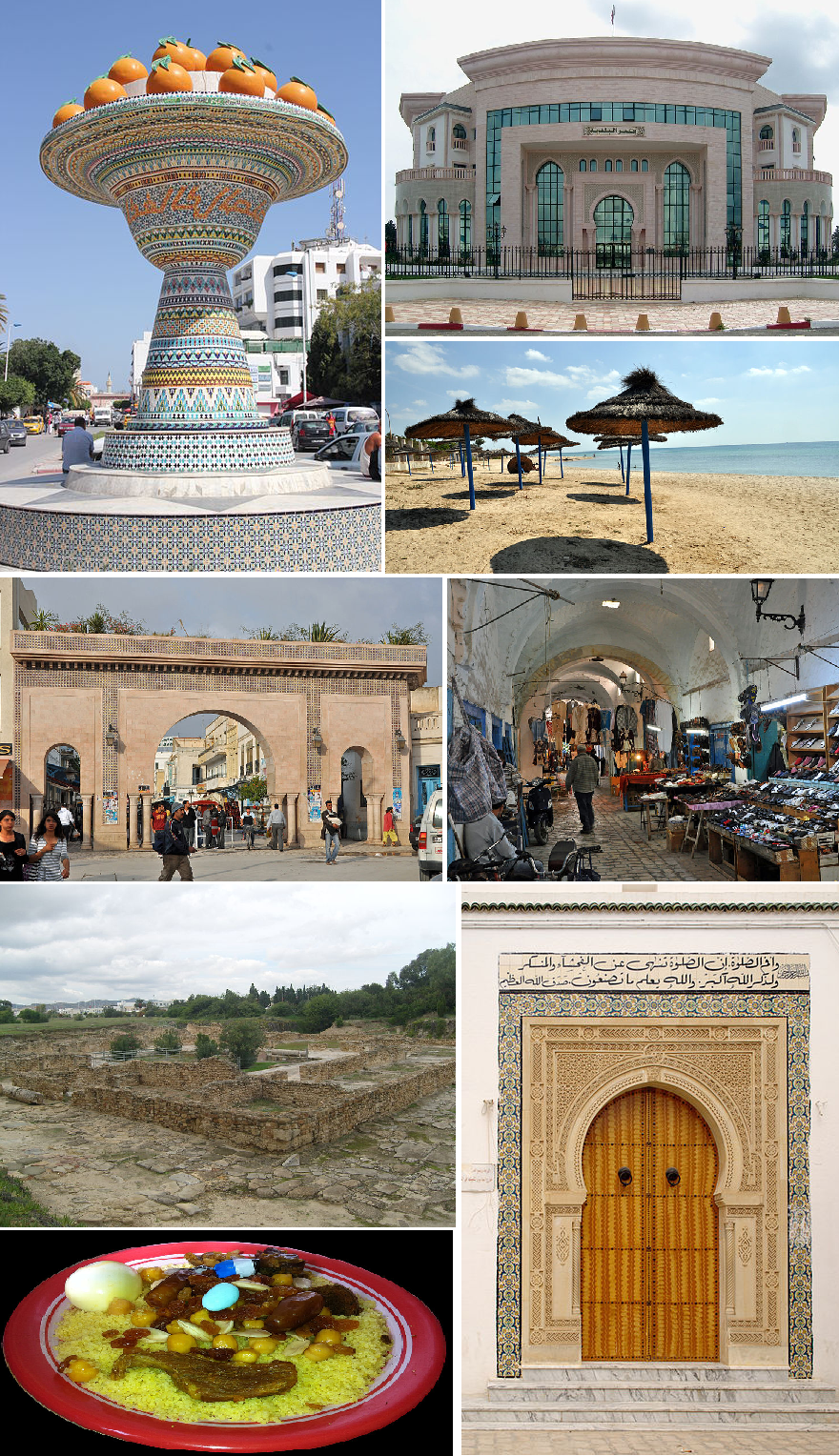

- Location in Tunisia
- Coordinates: 36°27′15″N 10°44′5″E
- Country: Tunisia
- Governorate: Nabeul Governorate
- Delegation(s): Nabeul

Government
  - Mayor: Basma Maatoug (Nidaa Tounes)

Population (2022)
  - Total: 84,291
- Time zone: UTC1 (CET)

Nabeul (/ˈnæbəl/; Arabic: نابل Tunisian Arabic pronunciation: [ˈne̞ː.bɘl]; Tamazight: ⵏⴰⴱⴻⵍ) is a coastal town located in northeastern Tunisia, on the south coast of the Cape Bon peninsula and surrounded by the Mediterranean Sea on both sides. It is the first seaside resort in Tunisia. It is known for its agricultural riches and its tourism potential. The city had a population of 84,291 as of the 2022 census.

== History ==
Nabeul was founded in the fifth century BC by the Greeks of Cyrene, serving as a trade port. Its present name is an arabization of its Greek name Neapolis (Νεάπολις, "New City"), which was a common name of Greek colonies. In Roman times, the city was an important trade hub for grain from North Africa to Rome, and a centre for manufacture of garum for Rome.

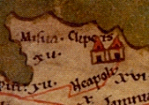
Neapolis, on the fourth-century Tabula Peutingeriana

On 21 July 365, a massive tsunami hit the city from the 365 Crete earthquake, resulting in much destruction and leaving part of it underwater.

During antiquity, Neapolis was also the seat of an ancient Christian bishopric The Bishopric was founded during the Roman Empire and survived through the arian Vandal and Orthodox Byzantine empires, only ceasing to function with the Muslim conquest of the Maghreb. The diocese was refounded in name at least in the twentieth century as a titular see of the Roman Catholic church.

After the Umayyad conquest of North Africa in the late 6th century and early 7th century, the city became part of the Umayyad Caliphate, and later the Abbasid Caliphate.

Under Ottoman rule, the town was known as Nebil (نابل).

Due to its location by the Mediterranean coast, it remains today a popular tourist destination and is the main centre of the Tunisian pottery industry.

== Climate ==
Nabeul, as well as the whole region of Cape Bon is known for its Mediterranean climate (Köppen climate classification Csa). In January, the temperature reaches 8.4 °C on the minimum average, with the maximum average attaining 15.8 °C. In August, the minimum temperature is 22.6 °C while the maximum is 30.6 °C.

Climate data for Nabeul (1991–2020, extremes 1981–present)
Month	Jan	Feb	Mar	Apr	May	Jun	Jul	Aug	Sep	Oct	Nov	Dec	Year
Record high °C (°F)	25.1 (77.2)	30.3 (86.5)	30.0 (86.0)	32.2 (90.0)	42.1 (107.8)	44.9 (112.8)	42.9 (109.2)	41.0 (105.8)	39.8 (103.6)	35.4 (95.7)	30.9 (87.6)	28.1 (82.6)	45 (113)
Mean daily maximum °C (°F)	16.3 (61.3)	16.4 (61.5)	18.4 (65.1)	20.7 (69.3)	24.5 (76.1)	29.0 (84.2)	31.9 (89.4)	32.4 (90.3)	29.0 (84.2)	25.5 (77.9)	21.0 (69.8)	17.4 (63.3)	23.5 (74.4)
Daily mean °C (°F)	12.7 (54.9)	12.6 (54.7)	14.5 (58.1)	16.7 (62.1)	20.1 (68.2)	24.3 (75.7)	27.1 (80.8)	27.8 (82.0)	25.1 (77.2)	21.8 (71.2)	17.4 (63.3)	13.9 (57.0)	19.5 (67.1)
Mean daily minimum °C (°F)	9.1 (48.4)	8.8 (47.8)	10.6 (51.1)	12.7 (54.9)	15.8 (60.4)	19.5 (67.1)	22.3 (72.1)	23.3 (73.9)	21.1 (70.0)	18.1 (64.6)	13.8 (56.8)	10.4 (50.7)	15.4 (59.7)
Record low °C (°F)	0.7 (33.3)	1.5 (34.7)	2.6 (36.7)	5.3 (41.5)	0.0 (32.0)	11.3 (52.3)	9.7 (49.5)	17.3 (63.1)	13.8 (56.8)	9.2 (48.6)	4.6 (40.3)	2.0 (35.6)	0.0 (32.0)
Average precipitation mm (inches)	50.9 (2.00)	36.4 (1.43)	35.8 (1.41)	31.5 (1.24)	20.2 (0.80)	6.2 (0.24)	4.2 (0.17)	11.5 (0.45)	47.0 (1.85)	60.0 (2.36)	55.3 (2.18)	50.1 (1.97)	409.1 (16.11)
Average precipitation days (≥ 1.0 mm)	6.2	5.7	4.8	4.8	2.9	1.3	0.5	1.6	4.6	5.3	5.6	6.1	49.4
Average relative humidity (%)	75	73	73	74	74	70	69	70	72	76	75	75	73
Mean monthly sunshine hours	143.4	152.5	201.9	223.9	289.5	312.3	363.4	321.7	231.8	183.7	171.3	152.6	2,748
Source 1: Institut National de la Météorologie (humidity 1961–1990, sun 1981-2010)
Source 2: NOAA

== Economy ==
Nabeul's modern economy is based primarily on tourism. The most famous hotels are mainly located at the seaside. The most known tourist resorts in Nabeul include the Roman archaeological site of Neapolis (positioned 2 kilometres away from downtown), the archaeological museum which offers ceramic and Punic statues dating back to the seventh century BC and an important collection of Roman mosaics proceeded from sites of the region.

Souk El Balgha is considered one of the most ancient and special souks in the region of Nabeul. It was dedicated to fabricating and selling the "balgha" heelless slippers made from leather. Souk Haddada is devoted for sheet metal workers. Souk Ezzit is where the traders sold the oil. The weekly Souk that takes place every Friday attracts many tourists and locals. The Medina of Nabeul can be accessed through many doors: Beb Blad, the main entry, Beb el Zaouia and Beb el Khoukha.

== Handicraft ==
Nabeul also is known in Tunisia and abroad for its handicraft that consists of artistic potteries, especially painted dishes as well as for wall tiles.

This craftwork was restarted during the first half of the twentieth century through the research of the French Tessier, Deverclos and the Tunisian Jacob Chemla.

== Agriculture ==
Nabeul's agriculture relies on oranges, lemons, and the bitter orange also known in French as Bigardier. People of Nabeul also distill flowers of bitter orange, Bourbon geranium, and Damask rose. They sell it mainly in the local souks and export the rest to the world.

== Gastronomy ==
Nabeul has been famous for its Harissa since the Andalusians arrived in Tunisia in the sixteenth century. They brought pepper and stored loads of it throughout the year. This activity called "El Oula" consists of preserving food ingredients all along the season and making it last longer in order to be consumed on a day-to-day basis. Many women in Nabeul are still committed to storing "El Oula" every year.

== Twin towns ==
- Marbella, Spain
- Seto, Aichi, Japan

== Gallery ==
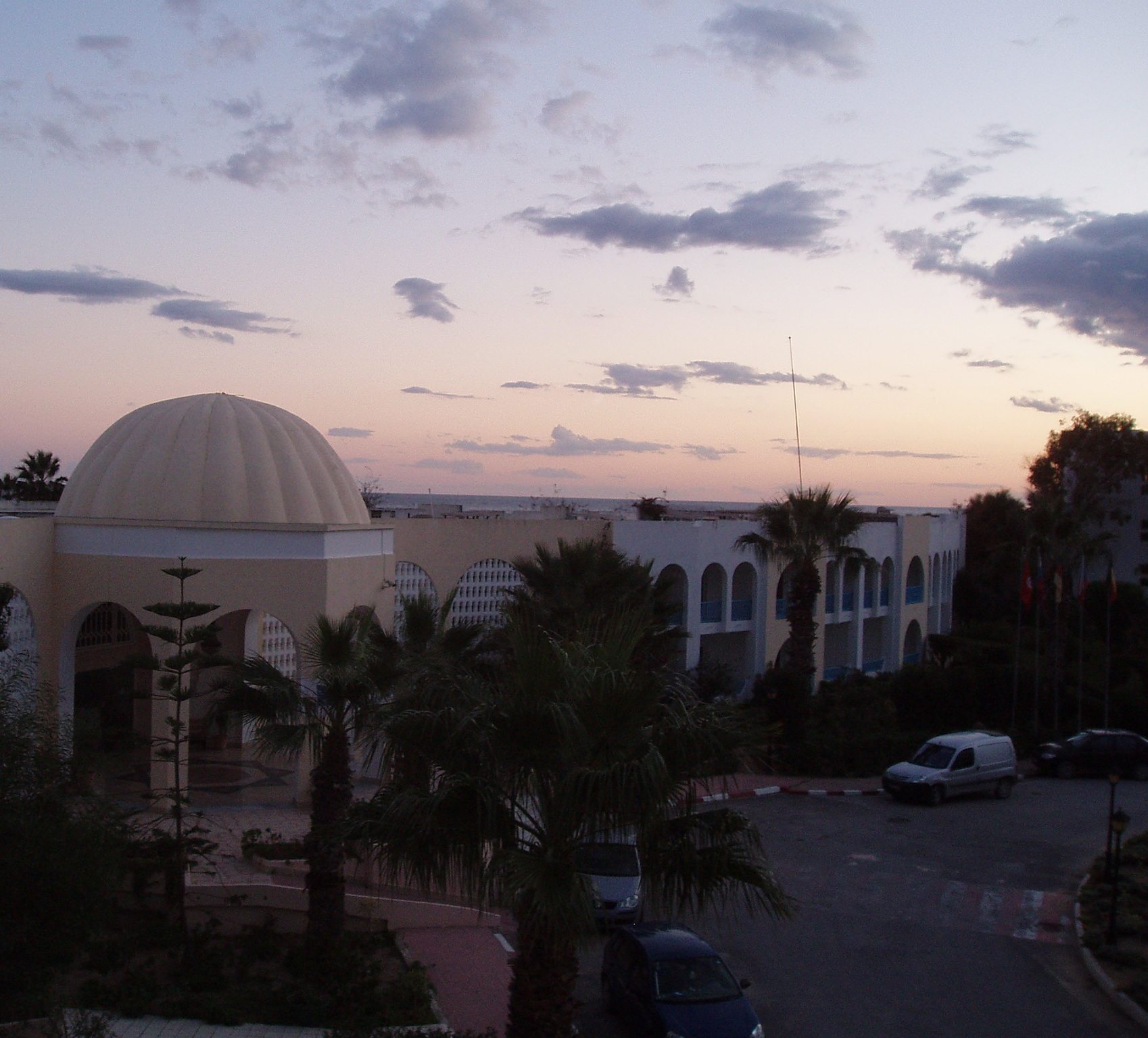

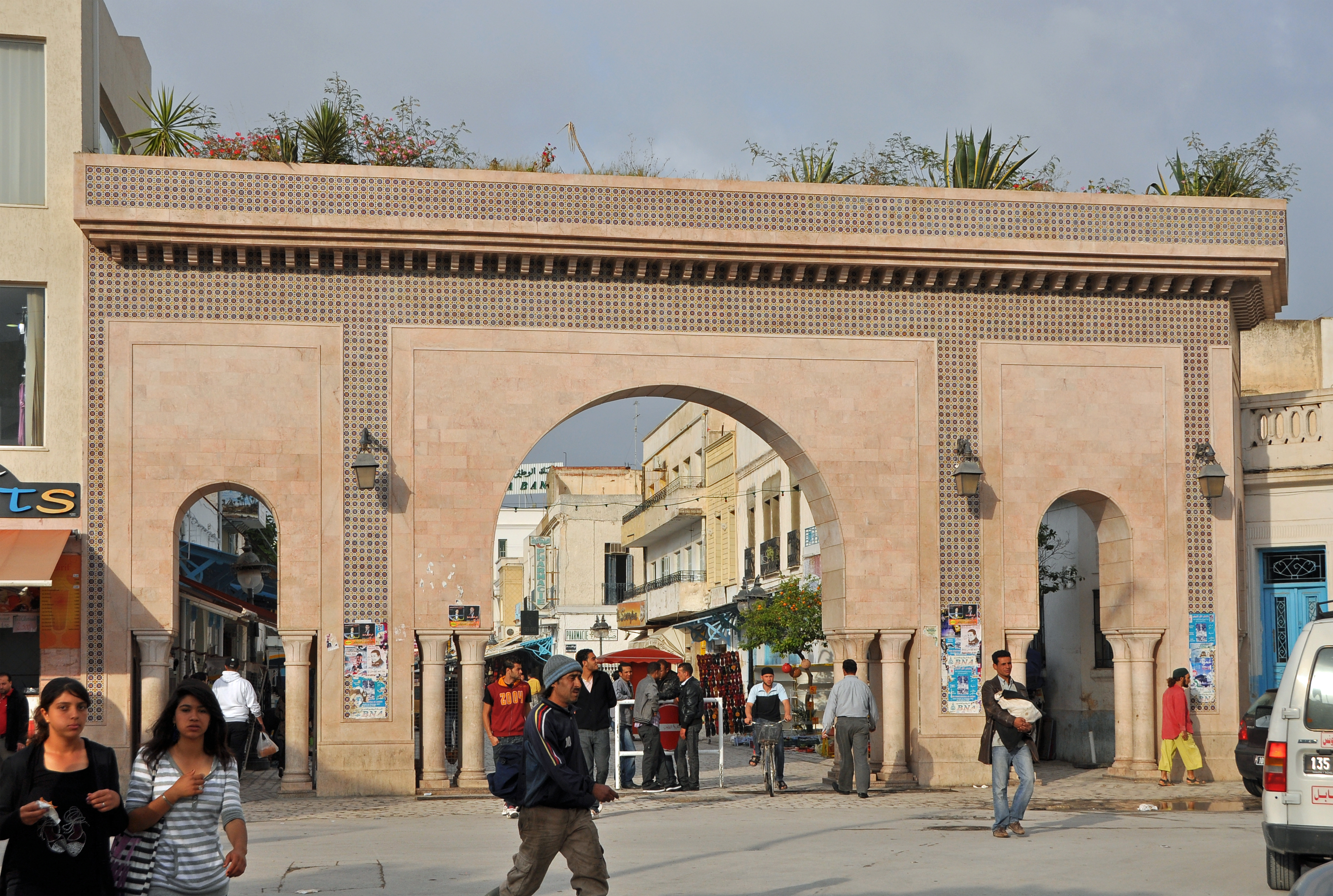

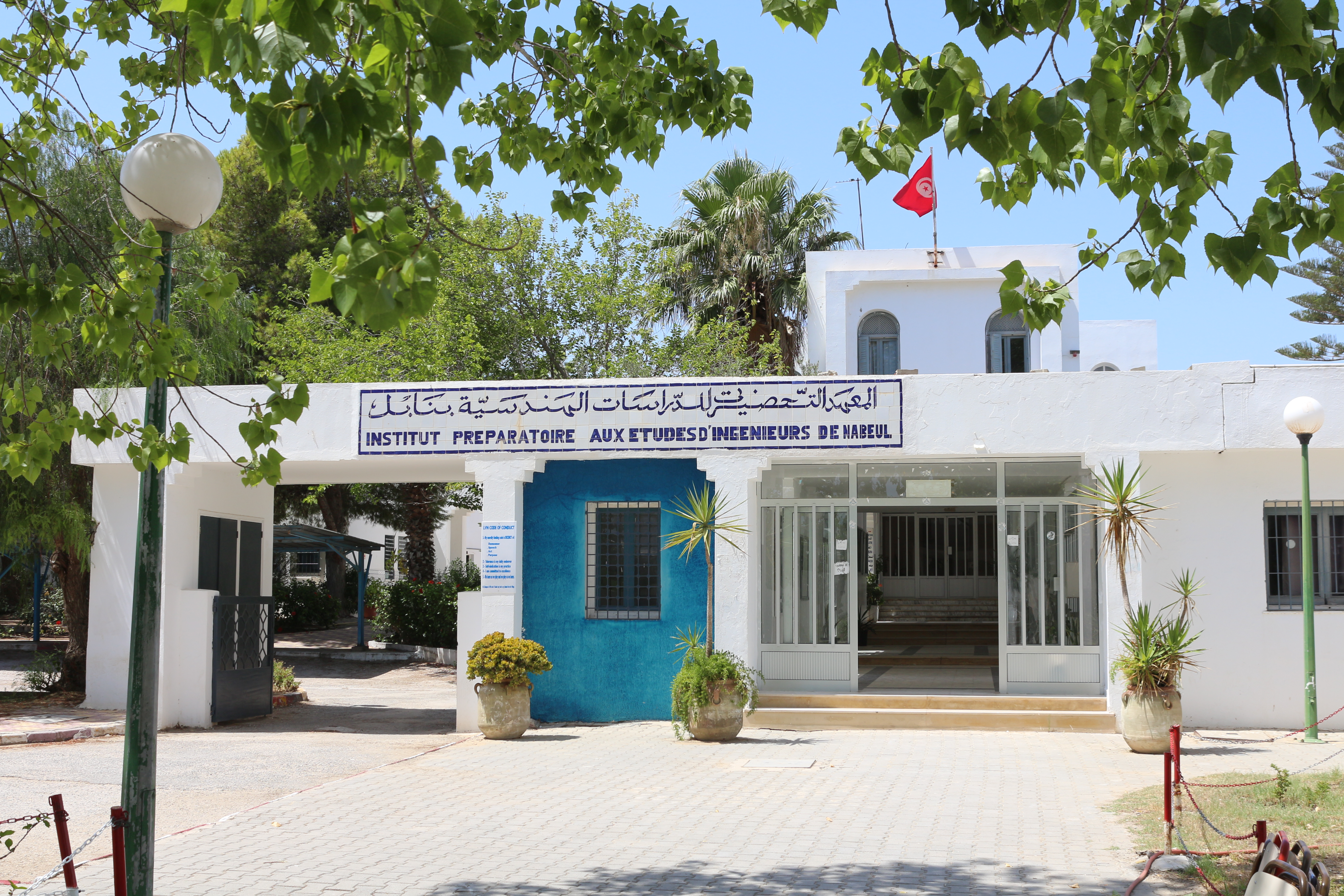

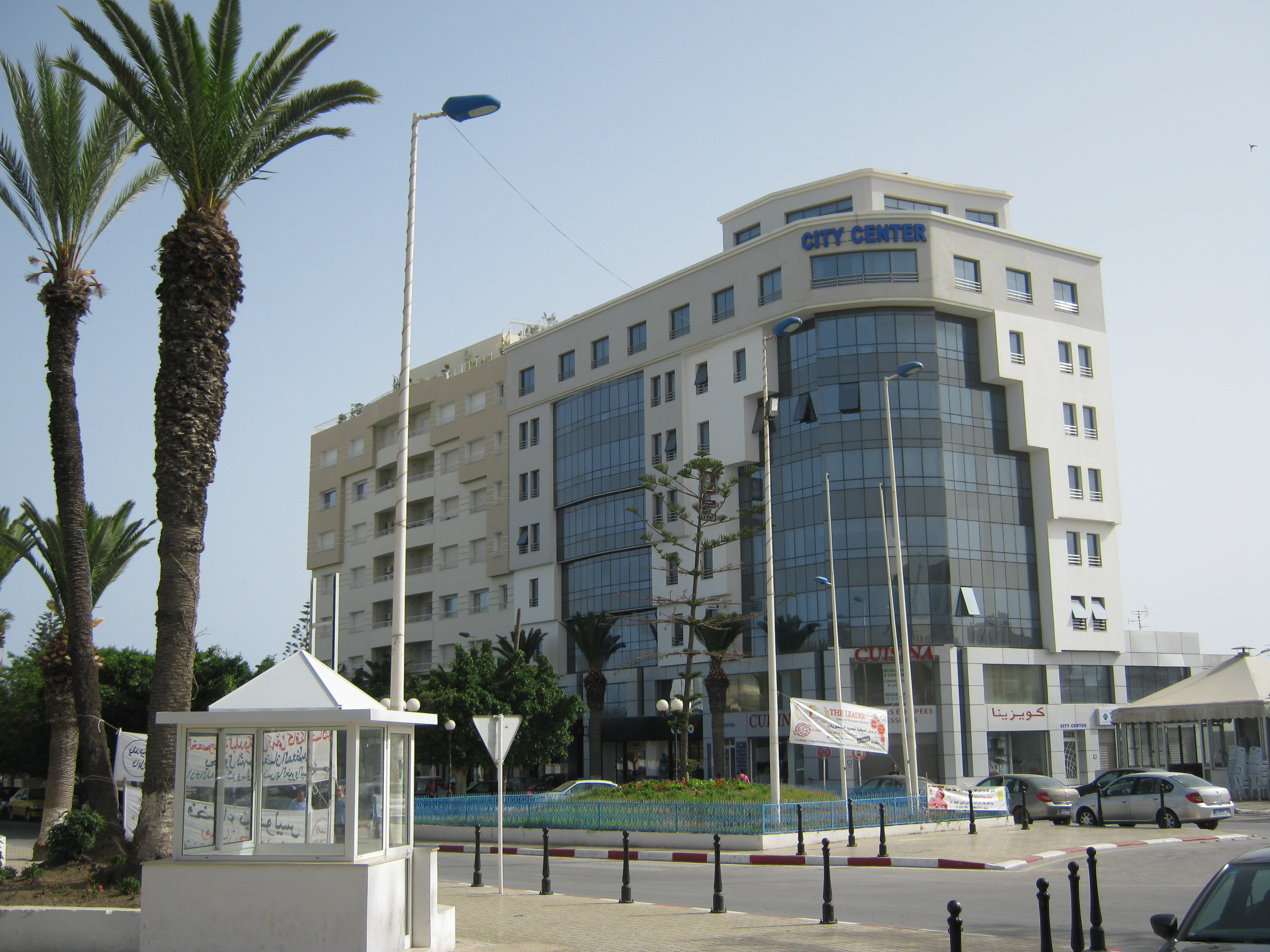

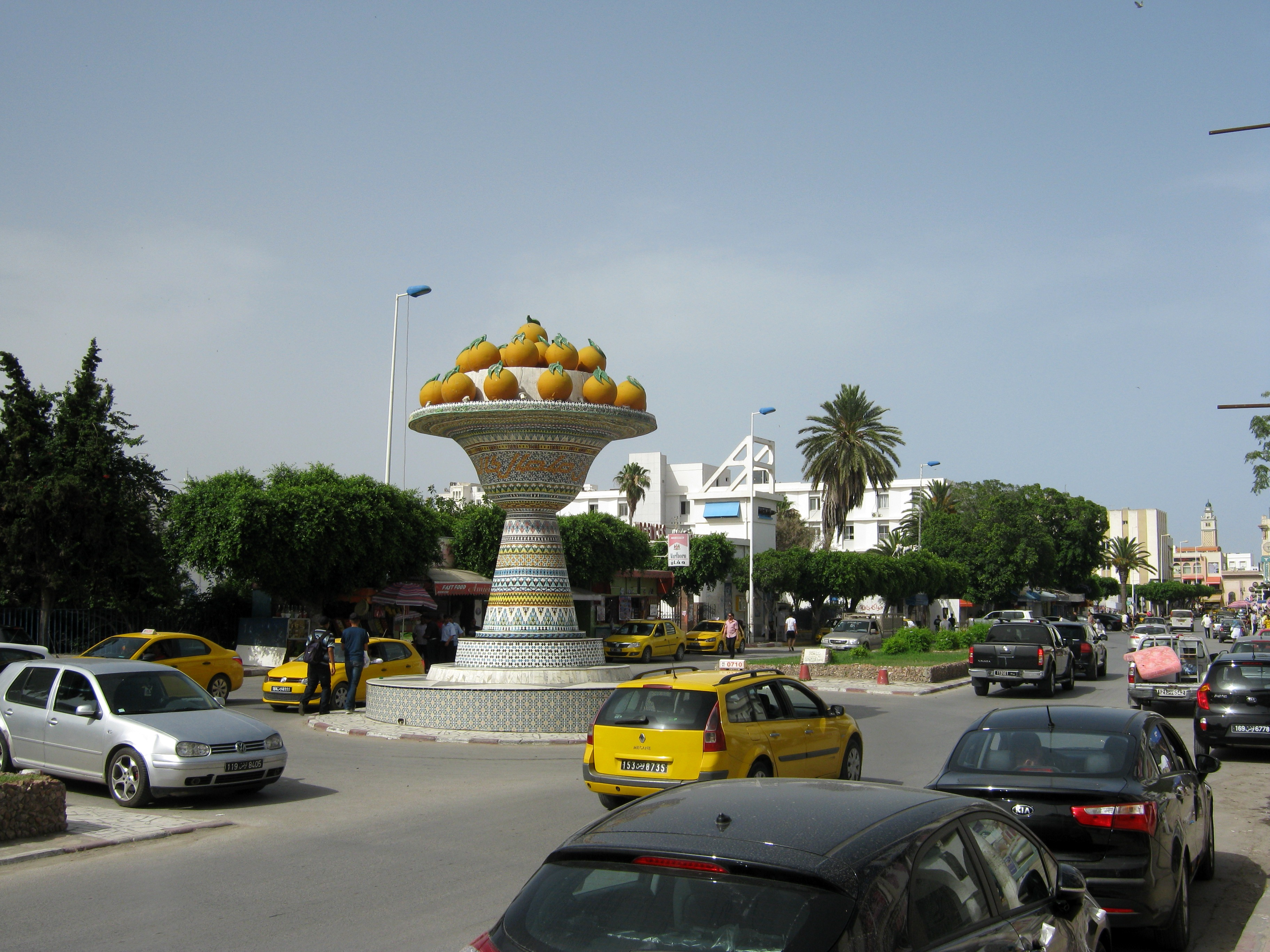

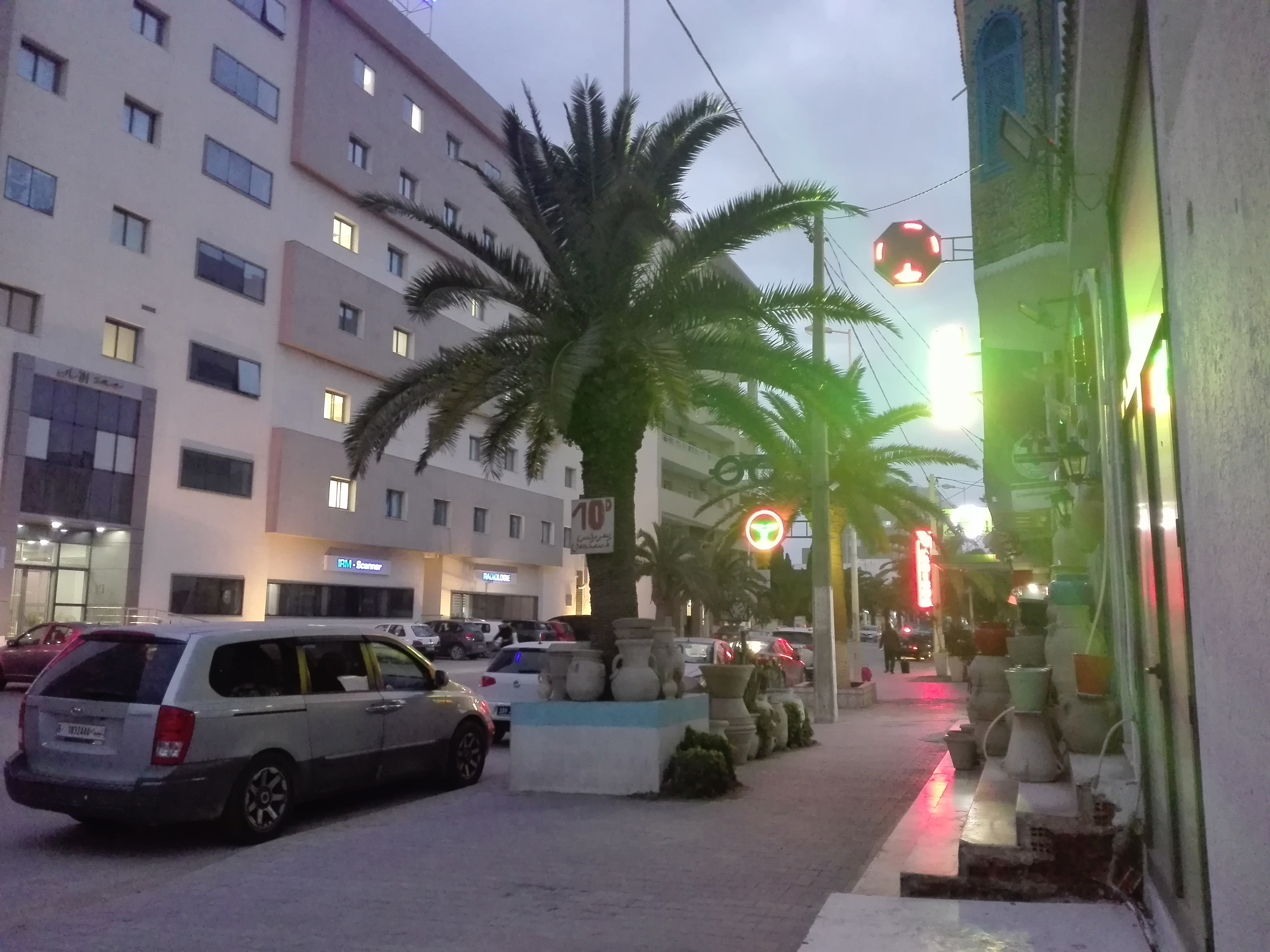

== See also ==
- List of cities in Tunisia
