= 2025–26 FC Noah season =

Noah
2025–26 season
- CEO: Artur Sahakyan
- Manager: Sandro Perković
- Stadium: Armavir City Stadium
- Premier League: 2nd
- Armenian Cup: Champions
- Armenian Supercup: Champions
- UEFA Champions League: Second qualifying round vs Ferencváros
- UEFA Europa League: Third qualifying round vs Lincoln Red Imps
- UEFA Conference League: Knockout phase play-off vs AZ
- Top goalscorer: League: Nardin Mulahusejnović (10); Hélder Ferreira (10); Matheus Aiás (10); All: Nardin Mulahusejnović (16)
Home colours	Away colours	Third colours

The 2025–26 season was FC Noah's 8th season in Armenian Premier League.

== Season events ==
On 3 June, Noah announced that they had extended their contract with Gustavo Sangaré for another two-years with an option for a third.

On 7 June, Noah announced that they had extended their contract with Guðmundur Þórarinsson for another season.

On 10 June, Noah announced that they had extended their contracts with Ognjen Čančarević, Hovhannes Hambardzumyan and Artak Dashyan.

On 14 June, Noah announced that Rui Mota had left his role as Head Coach, with Sandro Perković being appointed as the clubs new Head Coach later the same day.

On 28 June, Noah announced the signing of Takuto Oshima from Universitatea Craiova, on a contract until the summer of 2028.

On 29 June, Noah announced the signing of Alen Grgić from Slaven Belupo, on a contract until the summer of 2027.

On 30 June, Noah announced that they had extended their contract with Imran Oulad Omar until the summer of 2027.

On 1 July, Noah announced the signing of David Sualehe from Olimpija Ljubljana.

On 3 July, Noah announced the signing of Aram Khamoyan from BKMA Yerevan, Hovhannes Harutyunyan from Sochi to a two-year contract and Eric Boakye from Aris Limassol to a three-year contract.

On 4 July, Noah announced the signing of Marin Jakoliš to a two-year contract, having left Macarthur FC at the end of the previous season.

On 7 July, Noah announced that Hélder Ferreira had extended his contract with the club until the summer of 2027, with an option for an additional year.

On 31 July, Noah announced the signing of Nardin Mulahusejnović from Zrinjski Mostar, to a three-year contract.

On 3 September, Noah announced the loan signing of Timothy Fayulu from Sion until the end of the season, and the signing of Nathanaël Saintini on a permanent deal from Sion to a two-year contract with the option of an additional year.

On 11 September, Noah announced the signing of Albert Gareginyan from Shirak, to their academy.

On 22 December, Noah announced that Artak Dashyan had left the club.

On 13 January, Noah announced that Ognjen Čančarević had left the club.

On 17 January, Noah announced the signing of Misak Hakobyan on loan from Ararat-Armenia until the end of the year.

On 17 February, Slaven Belupo announced the signing of Alen Grgić from Noah.

On 20 February, Noah announced the signing of Valentin Costache from UTA Arad.

On 1 March, Noah announced the signing of Rob Nizet from Gaziantep.

== Squad ==
As of match played 27 May 2026

Number	Name	Nationality	Position	Date of birth (age)	Signed from	Signed in	Contract ends	Apps.	Goals
Goalkeepers
16	Timothy Fayulu	(Democratic Republic of the Congo)	GK	24 July 1999 (aged 26)	on loan from Sion	2025	2026	10	0
29	Arthur Coneglian	(Brazil)	GK	30 May 2004 (aged 21)	Grêmio	2024		18	0
92	Aleksey Ploshchadny	(Russia)	GK	21 April 2004 (aged 22)	Van	2024		25	0
Defenders
3	Sergey Muradyan	(Armenia)	DF	27 August 2004 (aged 21)	Zenit St.Petersburg	2023		119	4
4	Rob Nizet	(Belgium)	DF	14 April 2002 (aged 24)	Gaziantep	2026		9	0
6	Eric Boakye	(Ghana)	DF	19 November 1999 (aged 26)	Aris Limassol	2025	2028	41	0
19	Hovhannes Hambardzumyan	(Armenia)	DF	4 October 1990 (aged 35)	Anorthosis Famagusta	2023		93	9
33	David Sualehe	(Portugal)	DF	23 March 1997 (aged 29)	Olimpija Ljubljana	2025		42	0
37	Gonçalo Silva	(Portugal)	DF	4 June 1991 (aged 34)	Farense	2024		69	4
39	Nathanaël Saintini	(Guadeloupe)	DF	30 May 2000 (aged 25)	Sion	2025		33	3
44	Nermin Zolotić	(Bosnia and Herzegovina)	DF	7 July 1993 (aged 32)	Casa Pia	2025		41	3
Midfielders
10	Gor Manvelyan	(Armenia)	MF	9 April 2002 (aged 24)	Nantes	2023		102	12
11	Imran Oulad Omar	(Netherlands)	MF	11 December 1997 (aged 28)	Hapoel Be'er Sheva	2024	2027	65	17
14	Takuto Oshima	(Japan)	MF	1 June 1998 (aged 27)	Universitatea Craiova	2025	2028	38	2
17	Gustavo Sangaré	(Burkina Faso)	MF	8 November 1996 (aged 29)	Quevilly-Rouen	2024	2027(+1)	73	4
18	Artyom Avanesyan	(Armenia)	MF	17 July 1999 (aged 26)	Unattached	2024		34	2
20	Valentin Costache	(Romania)	MF	2 August 1998 (aged 27)	UTA Arad	2026		9	2
23	Aram Khamoyan	(Armenia)	MF	10 January 2000 (aged 26)	BKMA Yerevan	2025		16	2
88	Yan Eteki	(Cameroon)	MF	26 August 1997 (aged 28)	Alcorcón	2024		65	1
99	Hovhannes Harutyunyan	(Armenia)	MF	25 May 1999 (aged 27)	Sochi	2025		18	1
Forwards
7	Hélder Ferreira	(Portugal)	FW	5 April 1997 (aged 29)	Anorthosis Famagusta	2024	2027 (+1)	86	27
8	Gonçalo Gregório	(Portugal)	FW	14 June 1995 (aged 30)	Dinamo București	2024		46	27
9	Matheus Aiás	(Brazil)	FW	30 December 1996 (aged 29)	Moreirense	2024		77	32
22	Misak Hakobyan	(Armenia)	FW	11 June 2004 (aged 21)	on loan from Ararat-Armenia	2026	2026	2	0
24	Zaven Khudaverdyan	(Armenia)	FW	15 June 2007 (aged 18)	Pyunik	2024		26	2
32	Nardin Mulahusejnović	(Bosnia and Herzegovina)	FW	9 February 1998 (aged 28)	Zrinjski Mostar	2025	2028	43	16
47	Marin Jakoliš	(Croatia)	FW	26 December 1996 (aged 29)	Unattached	2025		43	8
Noah II
12	Artyom Davidov	(Armenia)	GK	2 September 2007 (aged 18)	Academy	2024		0	0
40	Hovhannes Gevorgyan	(Armenia)	DF	5 October 2006 (aged 19)	Mika	2024		0	0
43	David Dokhoyan	(Armenia)	DF	2 December 2008 (aged 17)	Pyunik	2024		0	0
48	Kim Tovmasyan	(Armenia)	GK	25 May 2007 (aged 19)	Academy	2025		0	0
50	Gagik Meloyan	(Armenia)	MF	23 March 2007 (aged 19)	Academy	2024		2	0
55	Artur Movsesyan	(Armenia)	MF	2 January 2008 (aged 18)	Academy	2024		7	0
57	Albert Gareginyan	(Armenia)	FW	3 November 2008 (aged 17)	Shirak	2025		1	0
60	Varazdat Gasparyan	(Armenia)	GK	7 March 2007 (aged 19)	Pyunik	2024		0	0
61	Gor Grigoryan	(Armenia)	DF	25 July 2007 (aged 18)	Academy	2024		1	0
62	Artur Talasyan	(Armenia)	DF	1 April 2005 (aged 21)	Urartu	2024		0	0
63	Aram Beganyan	(Armenia)	MF	5 April 2005 (aged 21)	Urartu	2024		0	0
64	Michael Asiryan	(Armenia)	FW	26 February 2008 (aged 18)	Pyunik	2024		1	0
67	Andranik Karapetyan	(Armenia)	FW	6 November 2006 (aged 19)	Mika	2024		1	0
68	Gevorg Grigoryan	(Armenia)	MF	5 April 2004 (aged 22)	Urartu	2024		1	0
69	Roman Khachatryan	(Armenia)	GK	16 November 2008 (aged 17)	Pyunik	2024		0	0
71	Bilal Fofana	(France)	FW	7 July 2006 (aged 19)	Farense	2024		10	0
Players away on loan
Players who left during the season
4	Guðmundur Þórarinsson	(Iceland)	DF	15 April 1992 (aged 34)	OFI	2024	2026	44	2
10	Artak Dashyan	(Armenia)	MF	20 November 1989 (aged 36)	Pyunik	2024		30	1
20	Martin Gamboš	(Slovakia)	MF	23 January 1998 (aged 28)	Västerås SK	2023		52	1
22	Ognjen Čančarević	(Armenia)	GK	25 September 1989 (aged 36)	Alashkert	2024		61	1
65	Gor Abrahamyan	(Armenia)	MF	7 December 2005 (aged 20)	Academy	2023		7	0
77	Alen Grgić	(Croatia)	MF	10 August 1994 (aged 31)	Slaven Belupo	2025	2027	20	2
93	Virgile Pinson	(France)	FW	22 February 1996 (aged 30)	Unattached	2024	2026 (+1)	62	11

== Transfers ==
=== In ===
Date	Position	Nationality	Name	From	Fee	Ref.
28 June 2025	MF	(Japan)	Takuto Oshima	Universitatea Craiova	Undisclosed	
29 June 2025	MF	(Croatia)	Alen Grgić	Slaven Belupo	Undisclosed	
1 July 2025	DF	(Portugal)	David Sualehe	Olimpija Ljubljana	Undisclosed	
3 July 2025	DF	(Ghana)	Eric Boakye	Aris Limassol	Undisclosed	
3 July 2025	MF	(Armenia)	Aram Khamoyan	BKMA Yerevan	Undisclosed	
3 July 2025	MF	(Armenia)	Hovhannes Harutyunyan	Sochi	Undisclosed	
4 July 2025	FW	(Croatia)	Marin Jakoliš	Unattached	Free	
31 July 2025	FW	(Bosnia and Herzegovina)	Nardin Mulahusejnović	Zrinjski Mostar	Undisclosed	
3 September 2025	DF	(Guadeloupe)	Nathanaël Saintini	Sion	Undisclosed	
11 September 2025	FW	(Armenia)	Albert Gareginyan	Shirak	Undisclosed	
20 February 2026	MF	(Romania)	Valentin Costache	UTA Arad	Undisclosed	
1 March 2026	DF	(Belgium)	Rob Nizet	Gaziantep	Undisclosed	

=== Loans in ===
Date from	Position	Nationality	Name	To	Date to	Ref.
3 September 2025	GK	(Democratic Republic of the Congo)	Timothy Fayulu	Sion	30 June 2026	
3 September 2026	FW	(Armenia)	Misak Hakobyan	Ararat-Armenia	31 December 2026	

=== Out ===
Date	Position	Nationality	Name	To	Fee	Ref.
24 August 2025	MF	(Armenia)	Gor Abrahamyan	Sardarapat	Undisclosed	
12 February 2026	FW	(France)	Virgile Pinson	Maccabi Bnei Reineh	Undisclosed	
17 February 2026	MF	(Croatia)	Alen Grgić	Slaven Belupo	Undisclosed	
2 June 2026	FW	(Bosnia and Herzegovina)	Nardin Mulahusejnović	Vojvodina	Undisclosed	
10 June 2026	DF	(Portugal)	Gonçalo Silva	Farense	Undisclosed	

=== Released ===
Date	Position	Nationality	Name	Joined	Date	Ref.
19 June 2025	DF	(Brazil)	James Santos	Van	4 August 2025	
30 June 2025	DF	(Argentina)	Bryan Mendoza	Boca Unidos		
30 June 2025	DF	(Brazil)	Marcos Pedro	Metropolitano		
30 June 2025	MF	(Armenia)	Robert Baghramyan	Grün-Weiss Deggendorf	1 July 2025	
30 June 2025	FW	(Albania)	Eraldo Çinari	Al-Jabalain		
30 June 2025	FW	(Armenia)	Grenik Petrosyan	BKMA Yerevan	2 July 2025	
1 August 2025	MF	(Slovakia)	Martin Gamboš	Komárno	30 August 2025	
22 December 2025	MF	(Armenia)	Artak Dashyan	Pyunik	13 January 2026	
13 January 2026	GK	(Armenia)	Ognjen Čančarević	IMT		
18 January 2026	DF	(Iceland)	Guðmundur Þórarinsson	ÍA	18 January 2026	
5 June 2026	GK	(Russia)	Aleksey Ploshchadny			
5 June 2026	MF	(Armenia)	Artyom Avanesyan	Gandzasar	27 July 2026	
5 June 2026	MF	(Armenia)	Hovhannes Harutyunyan	Pyunik	6 June 2026	
5 June 2026	FW	(Brazil)	Matheus Aiás	Jeju SK	12 July 2026	
11 June 2026	DF	(Belgium)	Rob Nizet	Iraklis	30 June 2026	
11 June 2026	DF	(Bosnia and Herzegovina)	Nermin Zolotić	Farense	12 June 2026	
30 June 2026	FW	(Portugal)	Gonçalo Gregório	Waldhof Mannheim	3 July 2026	

== Friendlies ==
17 June 2025	Noah	9–0	NK Čarda	Austria
(UTC+4)	Omar; Ferreira; Gregório; Asiryan; Fofana	Report

20 June 2025	Noah	2–1	NK Radomlje	Austria
(UTC+4)	Silva; Pinson	Report	Goal

27 June 2025	Noah	2–1	DAC 1904	Austria
(UTC+4)	Gregório; Manvelyan	Report	Goal

24 January 2026	Lech Poznań	0–1	Noah	United Arab Emirates
(UTC+4)		Report	Ferreira

31 January 2026	Noah	0–2	Lokomotiv Moscow	United Arab Emirates
(UTC+4)		Report	Goal

4 February 2026	Rostov	3–0	Noah	United Arab Emirates
(UTC+4)	Suleymanov 20'; Bayramyan 70'; Shantaly 79'	Report

7 February 2026	Yunnan Yukun	5–5	Noah	United Arab Emirates
(UTC+4)		Report

7 February 2026	Astana	0–0	Noah	United Arab Emirates
18:00 (UTC+4)		Report

== Competitions ==
=== Overview ===
Competition	First match	Last match	Starting round	Final position	Record							
Competition	First match	Last match	Starting round	Final position	Pld	W	D	L	GF	GA	GD	Win %
Premier League	3 August 2025	27 May 2026	Matchday 1	Runnersup	27	16	8	3	61	19	+42	59.26
Armenian Cup	5 March 2026	14 May 2026	Quarter-final	Winners	5	3	2	0	9	5	+4	60.00
Armenian Supercup	12 March 2026	12 March 2026	Final	Winners	1	0	1	0	1	1	+0	0.00
UEFA Champions League	8 July 2025	30 July 2025	First qualifying round	Second qualifying round	4	1	1	2	7	8	−1	25.00
UEFA Europa League	7 August 2025	14 August 2025	Third qualifying round	Third qualifying round	2	0	2	0	1	1	+0	0.00
UEFA Conference League	21 August 2025	27 February 2026	Play-off round	Knockout phase play-off	10	5	2	3	14	14	+0	50.00
Total					49	25	16	8	93	48	+45	51.02

Last updated: 27 May 2026
Source: Competitions

=== Armenian Supercup ===
12 March 2025	Noah	1–1 (a.e.t.) (4–2 p)	Ararat-Armenia	Yerevan
19:00 (UTC+4)	Ferreira 37' (pen.)	Report	Banjaqui 10'; Muradyan (yellow card) 38'; Ndour (yellow card) 71'; Bueno (yellow card) 80'	Stadium: Republican Stadium; Referee: Zaven Hovhannisyan
	Penalties
	Ferreira (penalty scored); Manvelyan (penalty scored); Jakoliš (penalty scored); Mulahusejnović (penalty scored)		(penalty scored) Oliveira; (penalty scored) Ayongo; (penalty missed) Eloyan; (penalty missed) Shaghoyan

=== Premier League ===
==== Results summary ====
Overall								Home						Away					
Pld	W	D	L	GF	GA	GD	Pts	W	D	L	GF	GA	GD	W	D	L	GF	GA	GD
27	16	8	3	61	19	+42	56	9	3	2	35	13	+22	7	5	1	26	6	+20

Last updated: 27 May 2026.
Source: See Results

==== Results by round ====
Round	1	3	5	6	7	4	8	9	10	11	12	14	15	2	17	18	19	20	21	22	23	24	16	25	26	13	27
Ground	H	H	A	H	A	H	H	A	H	A	H	H	A	H	A	A	H	H	A	H	A	H	A	A	H	A	A
Result	W	W	L	W	D	W	W	D	D	W	L	D	D	L	W	W	W	W	W	W	D	D	W	W	W	D	W
Position	1	4	2	4	4	3	2	3	3	4	4	5	5	5	5	5	4	4	4	4	4	4	2	2	2	2	2

Updated to match(es) played on 27 May 2026. Source: See Results
A = Away; H = Home; W = Win; D = Draw; L = Loss; P = Bye

==== Results ====
3 August 2025 1	Noah	4–0	Shirak	Abovyan
20:00 (UTC+4)	Harutyunyan (yellow card) 29'; Aiás 40'; Pinson 45+5'; Zolotić 61'; Oshima (yellow card) 75'; Mulahusejnović 88'	Report	Mnatsakanyan (yellow card) 35'	Stadium: Vahagn Tumasyan Stadium; Referee: Hovhannes Kalantaryan

17 August 2025 3	Noah	4–1	Gandzasar Kapan	Abovyan
20:00 (UTC+4)	Ferreira 8'; Manvelyan 24'; Þórarinsson (yellow card) 33'; Hambardzumyan (yellow card) 39'; Oshima 45+1'; Pinson 85'	Report	Merrill 26'; Emmanuel (yellow card) 69'; Guletskiy (yellow card) 90+2'	Stadium: Vahagn Tumasyan Sports Complex; Referee: Artem Gasparyan
Note: Match originally scheduled to be played at the Junior Sport Stadium in Yerevan, but was moved to the Vahagn Tumasyan Sports Complex in Abovyan on 12 August.

31 August 2025 5	Alashkert	2–0	Noah	Armavir
16:00 (UTC+4)	Farayola 11'; Touré 41'; Nalbandyan (yellow card) 73'; Nduka (yellow card) 90+7'	Report	Manvelyan (yellow card) 23'; Þórarinsson (yellow card) 35'; Zolotić (yellow card) 80'	Stadium: Hakob Tonoyan Stadium; Referee: Zaven Hovhannisyan

14 September 2025 6	Noah	3–1	Pyunik	Abovyan
19:00 (UTC+4)	Jakoliš 3'; Čančarević (yellow card) 41'; Ferreira 65'; Oshima (yellow card) 69'; Agbalyan 78' (o.g.)	Report	Islamović (yellow card) 36'; Malakyan (yellow card) 39'; Miljković (yellow card) 46'; Tarakhchyan 62'; Almeida (yellow card) 75'	Stadium: Vahagn Tumasyan Stadium; Referee: Artak Vardanyan

20 September 2025 7	Ararat-Armenia	2–2	Noah	Yerevan
18:00 (UTC+4)	Welton (red card) 5'; Oliveira 32'; Grigoryan (yellow card) 34'; Serobyan 77' (yellow card) 82'; Gbomadu (yellow card) 90+7'	Report	Mulahusejnović 22', 51'; Manvelyan (yellow card) 45+4'; Jakoliš (yellow card) 45+6' (yellow-red card) 68'; Sualehe (yellow card) 82'; Oshima (yellow card) 83'; Pinson (red card) 87'; Čančarević (yellow card) 88'	Stadium: Yerevan Football Academy Stadium; Referee: Henrik Nalbandian

24 September 2025 4	Noah	2–1	Van	Abovyan
19:00 (UTC+4)	Oulad Omar 26' (pen.); Muradyan (yellow card) 55'; Avanesyan (yellow card) 84'; Mulahusejnović 90+2'	Report	Ferreira (yellow card) 24'; Allef 75' (pen.)	Stadium: Vahagn Tumasyan Stadium; Referee: Sargis Khachatryan
Note: Match originally scheduled for 24 August, but postponed on 18 August.

28 September 2025 8	Noah	2–0	Ararat Yerevan	Yerevan
19:00 (UTC+4)	Manvelyan (yellow card) 73' (goal) 90+2' (pen.); Aiás 90+3'	Report	Dombila (red card) 38'; Handzongo (yellow card) 73'; Khachumyan (yellow card) 90+1'	Stadium: Republican Stadium; Referee: Zaven Hovhannisyan

5 October 2025 9	Urartu	0–0	Noah	Yerevan
20:00 (UTC+4)	Tsymbalyuk (yellow card) 28'; Piloyan (yellow card) 43'; Margaryan (yellow card) 85'; Vardanyan (yellow card) 87'	Report	Eteki (yellow card) 40'; Saintini (yellow card) 90+2'	Stadium: Urartu Stadium; Referee: Artem Gasparyan

18 October 2025 10	Noah	0–0	Urartu	Yerevan
19:00 (UTC+4)	Eteki (yellow card) 51'; Sualehe (yellow card) 74'	Report	Ghazaryan (yellow card) 27'; Piloyan (yellow card) 43'; Michel (yellow card) 85'	Stadium: Republican Stadium; Referee: Ashot Ghaltakhchyan

27 October 2025 11	Ararat Yerevan	0–3	Noah	Yerevan
19:00 (UTC+4)	Djire (yellow card) 4'; Moustapha (yellow card) 32'; Samsonyan (yellow card) 60'; Johna (yellow card) 67'; Grigoryan (yellow card) 71'	Report	Manvelyan (yellow card) 32'; Aiás 44', 63'; Oshima (yellow card) 54'; Khamoyan (yellow card) 58'; Hambardzumyan (yellow card) 83'; Sangaré 90+5'	Stadium: Republican Stadium; Referee: Yura Mahtesyan

1 November 2025 12	Noah	1–2	Ararat-Armenia	Abovyan
19:00 (UTC+4)	Ferreira (yellow card) 47' (goal) 48'; Muradyan (yellow card) 66'; Mulahusejnović (yellow card) 81'; Sangaré (yellow card) 85'	Report	Shaghoyan 21'; Queirós (yellow card) 47'; Eloyan (yellow card) 56'; Bueno (yellow card) 80'; Ambartsumyan 86'; Lima (yellow card) 89'; Balanta (yellow card) 90+1'; Welton (yellow card) 90+4'	Stadium: Vahagn Tumasyan Stadium; Referee: Ashot Harutyunyan

22 November 2025 14	Noah	2–2	Alashkert	Abovyan
18:00 (UTC+4)	Saintini (yellow card) 8'; Manvelyan 14' (pen.); Silva (yellow card) 18'; Sualehe (red card) 21'; Hambardzumyan 38' (yellow card) 40'; Khamoyan (yellow card) 53'; Fofana (yellow card) 64'; Sangaré (yellow card) 88'	Report	Sadoyan (yellow card) 12'; Nalbandyan 25' (pen.); Nduka (yellow card) 58'; Touré 78' (yellow card) 90+6'; Piloyan (yellow card) 90+9'	Stadium: Vahagn Tumasyan Stadium; Referee: Yura Mahtesyan

2 December 2025 15	Van	0–0	Noah	Charentsavan
15:00 (UTC+4)	Granado (yellow card) 45+1'; Doh (yellow card) 75'	Report	Dashyan (yellow card) 25'; Silva (yellow card) 73'; Hambardzumyan (yellow card) 84'	Stadium: City Stadium; Referee: Hovhannes Kalantarian

6 December 2025 2	Noah	2–3	BKMA Yerevan	Abovyan
16:00 (UTC+4)	Ferreira 9', 56' (yellow card) 45+6'; Sangaré (yellow card) 20'; Mulahusejnović (red card) 28'; Hambardzumyan (yellow card) 35'; Fofana (red card) 64'	Report	G.Petrosyan 4', 23' (yellow card) 45+6'; Askaryan (yellow card) 18'; Hovhannisyan 44'; A.Petrosyan (yellow card) 45+5'; Davtyan (yellow card) 74'; Arakelyan (yellow card) 75'	Stadium: Vahagn Tumasyan Stadium; Referee: Ashot Harutyunyan
Note: Match originally scheduled for 10 August 2025.

8 March 2026 17	BKMA Yerevan	0–2	Noah	Yerevan
(UTC+4)	Petrosyan (yellow card) 13' (yellow-red card); Hovhannisyan (yellow card) 86'	Report	Sualehe (red card) 27'; Avetisyan 44' (o.g.); Ferreira 90+8' (pen.)	Stadium: Yerevan Football Academy Stadium; Referee: Vardan Manukyan

16 March 2026 18	Shirak	0–2	Noah	Gyumri
19:00 (UTC+4)	Ghumashyan (yellow card) 79'	Report	Costache 34'; Nizet (yellow card) 45'; Zolotić 51'; Ferreira (yellow card) 59'; Harutyunyan (yellow card) 67'	Stadium: City Stadium; Referee: Henrik Nalbandian

22 March 2026 19	Noah	3–0	Shirak	Abovyan
16:00 (UTC+4)	Sangaré 23'; Mulahusejnović 28'; Eteki (yellow card) 52'; (yellow card) 52'; Ferreira 76' (pen.)	Report	Manukyan (yellow card) 58'	Stadium: Vahagn Tumasyan Stadium; Referee: Hovhannes Kalantaryan

5 April 2026 20	Noah	2–0	BKMA Yerevan	Abovyan
16:00 (UTC+4)	Aiás 14'; Eteki (yellow card) 65'; Ferreira 81' (pen.) (yellow card) 83'; Manvelyan (yellow card) 90+2'	Report	Harutyunyan (yellow card) 1'; Arakelyan (yellow card) 26'; Askaryan (yellow card) 55'	Stadium: Vahagn Tumasyan Stadium; Referee: Artem Gasparyan

10 April 2026 21	Gandzasar Kapan	0–3	Noah	Yerevan
19:00 (UTC+4)	Ekongolo (yellow card) 52'; Obonde (yellow card) 66'	Report	Oulad Omar (yellow card) 38'; Aiás 42'; Muradyan 60'; Sualehe (yellow card) 72'; Mulahusejnović 74'; Eteki (yellow card) 81'	Stadium: Junior Sport Stadium; Referee: Ashot Ghaltakhchyan

20 April 2026 22	Noah	2–0	Van	Abovyan
16:00 (UTC+4)	Silva 45'; Oshima (yellow card) 63' (goal) 67'	Report	Maurinho (yellow card) 75'	Stadium: Vahagn Tumasyan Stadium; Referee: Tiran Yeritsyan

25 April 2026 23	Alashkert	1–1	Noah	Armavir
15:30 (UTC+4)	Piloyan (yellow card) 31'; Touré 80'; Farayola (yellow card) 87'; Beglaryan (yellow card) 90+5'	Report	Coneglian (yellow card) 73'; Sualehe (yellow card) 73'; Sangaré (yellow card) 82'; Oulad Omar 89'	Stadium: Hakob Tonoyan Stadium; Referee: Ashot Harutyunyan

3 May 2026 24	Noah	0–0	Pyunik	Abovyan
16:00 (UTC+4)	Khamoyan (yellow card) 40'; Hambardzumyan (yellow card) 60'; Ferreira (yellow card) 85'; Zolotić (yellow card) 90+10'	Report	Yansané (yellow card) 45+1'; Dashyan (yellow card) 70'; Kovalenko (yellow card) 82'; Almeida (yellow card) 85'; Hovhannisyan (yellow card) 90+2'; Noubissi (yellow card) 90+3'	Stadium: Vahagn Tumasyan Stadium; Referee: Henrik Nalbandian

6 May 2026 16	Gandzasar Kapan	1–4	Noah	Yerevan
19:00 (UTC+4)	Kanda (yellow card) 34'; Nóbrega 66'	Report	Avanesyan 20' (yellow card) 45+4'; Manvelyan (yellow card) 47'; Nizet (yellow card) 60'; Mulahusejnović 74', 81'; Sangaré 90+4'	Stadium: Junior Sport Stadium; Referee: David Mkrtchyan
Note: Match originally scheduled for 2 March 2026, but postponed on 27 February due to adverse weather conditions.

10 May 2026 25	Ararat-Armenia	0–4	Noah	Abovyan
18:00 (UTC+4)	Serobyan (yellow card) 24'	Report	Mulahusejnović 13'; Ferreira 18'; Aiás 85', 90+2'	Stadium: Vahagn Tumasyan Stadium; Referee: Ashot Ghaltakhchyan

19 May 2026 26	Noah	8–3	Ararat Yerevan	Abovyan
19:00 (UTC+4)	Oshima (yellow card) 13'; Aiás 14', 28'; Saintini 23'; Ferreira (yellow card) 43' (goal) 75'; Jakoliš 53', 57'; Oulad Omar 85' (pen.); Mulahusejnović 89'	Report	Aslanyan (yellow card) 25'; Doumbia 44'; Ouattara 47'; Lulukyan 70'; Berte (yellow card) 71'; Anzimati (yellow card) 85'	Stadium: Vahagn Tumasyan Stadium; Referee: Artak Vardanyan

23 May 2026 13	Pyunik	0–0	Noah	Abovyan
19:00 (UTC+4)	Tarakhchyan (yellow card) 19'; Kulikov (yellow card) 30'	Report	Khamoyan (yellow card) 70'; Saintini (yellow card) 90+5'; Zolotić (yellow card) 90+5'	Stadium: Vahagn Tumasyan Stadium
Note: Match originally scheduled for 8 November 2025, but postponed.

27 May 2026 27	Urartu	0–5	Noah	Yerevan
19:00 (UTC+4)		Report	Manvelyan 2'; Saintini 5'; Khamoyan 59'; Jakoliš 75'; Sangaré 78'	Stadium: Urartu Stadium; Referee: Zaven Hovhannisyan

==== League table ====
Pos	Team	Pld	W	D	L	GF	GA	GD	Pts	Qualification or relegation
1	Ararat-Armenia (C)	27	18	6	3	50	25	+25	60	Qualification for the Champions League first qualifying round
2	Noah	27	16	8	3	61	19	+42	56	Qualification for the Conference League second qualifying round (Note: The 2025–26 Armenian Cup winners (Noah) qualify for the Conference League second qualifying round.)
3	Pyunik	27	17	4	6	37	18	+19	55	Qualification for the Conference League first qualifying round
4	Alashkert	27	16	5	6	42	23	+19	53	Qualification for the Conference League first qualifying round
5	Urartu	27	14	7	6	43	26	+17	49	
6	Van	27	9	4	14	27	40	−13	31	
7	BKMA	27	4	11	12	30	42	−12	23	
8	Gandzasar Kapan	27	5	6	16	20	41	−21	21	
9	Ararat Yerevan	27	3	4	20	21	63	−42	13 (Note: Matches won: Ararat 3, Shirak 2)	
10	Shirak	27	2	7	18	17	51	−34	13	

Source: FFA
Rules for classification: 1) Points; 2) Head-to-head points; 3) Head-to-head goal difference; 4) Head-to-head goals scored; 5) Matches won; 6) Goal difference; 7) Less red cards; 8) Less yellow cards; 9) Fair-play ranking 10) Draw
(C) Champions

=== Armenian Cup ===
5 March 2026 Quarter-final 1st leg	Pyunik	1–2	Noah	Yerevan
15:00 (UTC+4)	Vakulenko (yellow card) 49'; Moreno 58' (pen.); Ocansey (red card) 90+5'	Report	Costache 49'; Hambardzumyan 67'	Stadium: Junior Sport Stadium; Referee: Henrik Nalbandian

1 April 2026 Quarter-final 2nd leg	Noah	2–2 (4–3 agg.)	Pyunik	Abovyan
16:00 (UTC+4)	Khamoyan 31' (yellow card) 80'; Sualehe (yellow card) 45+6'; Eteki (yellow card) 58'; Saintini (yellow card) 68'; Jakoliš 86'	Report	Miljković 37'; Hovhannisyan (yellow card) 45+1' (goal) 45+6'; Kovalenko (yellow card) 45+6'; Islamović (yellow card) 53'; Tarakhchyan (yellow card) 90+3'	Stadium: Vahagn Tumasyan Stadium; Referee: Ashot Harutyunyan

16 April 2026 Semi-final 1st leg	Ararat-Armenia	0–1	Noah	Abovyan
18:30 (UTC+4)	Hovhannisyan (red card) 73'; Malis (yellow card) 73'; Queirós (yellow card) 90'	Report	Mulahusejnović 25' (yellow card) 51'; Saintini (red card) 73'; Sangaré (yellow card) 73'; Oshima (yellow card) 88'; Coneglian (yellow card) 90+5'; Hambardzumyan (yellow card) 90+10'	Stadium: Vahagn Tumasyan Stadium; Referee: Vardan Manukyan

29 April 2026 Semi-final 2nd leg	Noah	0–0 (1–0 agg.)	Ararat-Armenia	Abovyan
18:30 (UTC+4)	Zolotić (yellow card) 51'; Coneglian (yellow card) 80'; Khamoyan (yellow card) 84'	Report	Bueno (yellow card) 45'	Stadium: Vahagn Tumasyan Stadium; Referee: Zaven Yohannya

14 May 2026 Final	Urartu	2–4	Noah	Yerevan
19:00 (UTC+4)	Mirzoyan 10'; Santos (yellow card) 45'; Vardanyan 75'	Report	Ferreira 26'; Jakoliš 45+1', 52'; Saintini 57'	Stadium: Republican Stadium; Referee: Erik Lambrechts

=== UEFA Champions League ===
==== Qualifying rounds ====
8 July 2025 First qualifying round 1st leg	Noah (Armenia)	1–0	(Montenegro) Budućnost Podgorica	Abovyan, Armenia
20:00 (UTC+4)	Pinson (yellow card) 47'; Sualehe (yellow card) 55'; Oulad Omar 68'; Jakoliš (yellow card) 70'	Report	Serikov (yellow card) 47'; Orahovac (yellow card) 15'; I.Bulatović (yellow card) 53'; Ivanović (yellow card) 54'	Stadium: Vahagn Tumasyan Stadium; Attendance: 2,905; Referee: Volen Chinkov (Bulgaria)

15 July 2025 First qualifying round 2nd leg	Budućnost Podgorica (Montenegro)	2–2 (2–3 agg.)	(Armenia) Noah	Podgorica, Montenegro
23:00 (UTC+4)	I.Bulatović (yellow card) 15' (yellow-red card) 17'; Strumia (yellow card) 17'; Milićković (yellow card) 48'; Ivanović 68' (yellow card) 70'; Grbić 90+1'	Report	Oulad Omar 6'; Grgić 29'; Gregório (yellow card) 72'; Aiás (penalty missed) 90'	Stadium: City Stadium; Attendance: 6,150; Referee: Matthias Jöllenbeck (Germany)

22 July 2025 Second qualifying round 1st leg	Noah (Armenia)	1–2	(Hungary) Ferencváros	Abovyan, Armenia
20:00 (UTC+4)	Gartenmann 35' (o.g.); Grgić (yellow card) 48'; Ferreira (yellow card) 49'	Report	O'Dowda 45'; Varga 49'; Cissé (red card) 82'	Stadium: Vahagn Tumasyan Stadium; Attendance: 2,800; Referee: Ricardo de Burgos (Spain)

30 July 2025 Second qualifying round 2nd leg	Ferencváros (Hungary)	4–3 (6–4 agg.)	(Armenia) Noah	Budapest, Hungary
23:00 (UTC+4)	Pešić 1'; Joseph 12'; Raemaekers (yellow card) 36'; Zachariassen 52' (pen.); B. Varga 74'; O'Dowda (yellow card) 90+1'	Report	Ferreira 7'; Boakye (yellow card) 18'; Aiás 22'; Þórarinsson (yellow card) 29'; Grgić 71'; Sualehe (yellow card) 88'; Sangaré (yellow card) 90+6'	Stadium: Ferencváros Stadion; Attendance: 17,039; Referee: Robert Jones (England)

=== UEFA Europa League ===
==== Qualifying rounds ====
7 August 2025 Third qualifying round 1st leg	Lincoln Red Imps (Gibraltar)	1–1	(Armenia) Noah	Gibraltar
20:00 (UTC+4)	Rutjens (yellow card) 28'; De Barr 45+9'	Report	Eteki 9' (yellow card) 45+8'; Aiás (yellow card) 33'; Muradyan (yellow card) 61'; Silva (yellow card) 80'; Sangaré (yellow card) 85'; Oulad Omar (yellow card) 87'; Mulahusejnović (yellow card) 90+10'	Stadium: Europa Sports Park; Attendance: 728; Referee: Filip Glova (Slovakia)
Note: Lincoln Red Imps play their home matches at Europa Sports Park, instead of the Victoria Stadium, due to renovation works.

14 August 2025 Third qualifying round 2nd leg	Noah (Armenia)	0–0 (1–1 agg.) (5–6 p)	(Gibraltar) Lincoln Red Imps	Abovyan, Armenia
20:00 (UTC+4)	Sangaré (yellow card) 23'; Pinson (yellow card) 60'	Report	Rutjens (yellow card) 34'; Ayew (yellow card) 59'; Gómez (yellow card) 118'	Stadium: Vahagn Tumasyan Stadium; Attendance: 3,100; Referee: Sebastian Gishamer (Austria)
	Penalties
	Mulahusejnović (penalty scored); Manvelyan (penalty scored); Muradyan (penalty missed); Jakoliš (penalty scored); Hambardzumyan (penalty scored); Þórarinsson (penalty scored); Eteki (penalty missed)		(penalty missed) Nano; (penalty scored) De Barr; (penalty scored) Juanje; (penalty scored) Gómez; (penalty scored) Rutjens; (penalty scored) Clinton; (penalty scored) Lopes

=== UEFA Conference League ===
==== Qualifying rounds ====
21 August 2025 Play-off round 1st leg	Olimpija Ljubljana (Slovenia)	1–4	(Armenia) Noah	Ljubljana, Slovenia
22:00 (UTC+4)	Durdov 56'; Marin (yellow card) 65'; Mitrovski (yellow card) 82'; Govea (yellow card) 86'	Report	Jakoliš 36'; Oulad Omar 39', 52' (pen.), 64'; Mulahusejnović (yellow card) 85'	Stadium: Stožice Stadium; Attendance: 3,937; Referee: Allard Lindhout (Netherlands)

28 August 2025 Play-off round 2nd leg	Noah (Armenia)	3–2 (7–3 agg.)	(Slovenia) Olimpija Ljubljana	Abovyan, Armenia
20:00 (UTC+4)	Muradyan (yellow card) 2'; Ferreira 17'; Aiás 20'; Sangaré (yellow card) 59'; Harutyunyan 77'; Jakoliš (yellow card) 88'	Report	Marin 56' (pen.); Durdov 76'; Diga (yellow card) 81'	Stadium: Vahagn Tumasyan Stadium; Attendance: 2,900; Referee: Andris Treimanis (Latvia)

==== League Phase ====
Pos	Team	Pld	W	D	L	GF	GA	GD	Pts	Qualification
17	(Polish Football Association) Jagiellonia Białystok	6	2	3	1	5	4	+1	9	Advance to knockout phase play-offs (unseeded)
18	(Cyprus Football Association) Omonia	6	2	2	2	5	4	+1	8	Advance to knockout phase play-offs (unseeded)
19	(Football Federation of Armenia) Noah	6	2	2	2	6	7	−1	8	Advance to knockout phase play-offs (unseeded)
20	(Football Federation of Kosovo) Drita	6	2	2	2	4	8	−4	8	Advance to knockout phase play-offs (unseeded)
21	(Football Association of Finland) KuPS	6	1	4	1	6	5	+1	7	Advance to knockout phase play-offs (unseeded)

Source: UEFA
Rules for classification: League phase tiebreakers

2 October 2025 1	Noah (Armenia)	1–0	(Croatia) Rijeka	Yerevan, Armenia
20:45 (UTC+4)	Mulahusejnović 6'; Ferreira (yellow card) 71'	Report	Janković (red card) 29'; Menalo (yellow card) 44'; Husić (yellow card) 76'; Petrovič (yellow card) 86'	Stadium: Republican Stadium; Attendance: 11,500; Referee: Radoslav Gidzhenov (Bulgaria)
Note: Noah played their home matches at Vazgen Sargsyan Republican Stadium, Yerevan, instead of their regular stadium, Armavir City Stadium, Armavir, which did not meet UEFA requirements.

23 October 2025 2	Universitatea Craiova (Romania)	1–1	(Armenia) Noah	Craiova, Romania
23:00 (UTC+4)	Al Hamlawi (yellow card) 23'; Bancu (yellow card) 25'; Etim 38'	Report	Eteki (yellow card) 61'; Mulahusejnović 73'	Stadium: Ion Oblemenco Stadium; Attendance: 18,004; Referee: Gal Leibovitz (Israel)

6 November 2025 3	Noah (Armenia)	1–2	(Czech Republic) Sigma Olomouc	Yerevan, Armenia
21:45 (UTC+4)	Mulahusejnović 21' (yellow card) 59'; Oulad Omar (yellow card) 90'; Sualehe (yellow card) 90+2'	Report	Slavíček 10' (yellow card) 83'; Sylla 24'; Breite (yellow card) 45+1'	Stadium: Republican Stadium; Attendance: 10,000; Referee: Mohammad Usman Aslam (Norway)
Note: Noah played their home matches at Vazgen Sargsyan Republican Stadium, Yerevan, instead of their regular stadium, Armavir City Stadium, Armavir, which did not meet UEFA requirements.

28 November 2025 4	Aberdeen (Scotland)	1–1	(Armenia) Noah	Aberdeen, Scotland
00:00 (UTC+4)	Nisbet 45'; Keskinen (yellow card) 45+3'; Shinnie (yellow card) 59'; Milne (yellow card) 63'; Milanovic (yellow card) 74'	Report	Saintini (yellow card) 46'; Mulahusejnović 52'	Stadium: Pittodrie Stadium; Attendance: 15,060; Referee: Paweł Raczkowski (Poland)

11 December 2025 5	Noah (Armenia)	2–1	(Poland) Legia Warsaw	Yerevan, Armenia
21:45 (UTC+4)	Aiás (yellow card) 37' (goal) 57'; Mulahusejnović 84'	Report	Rajović 3'; Szymański (yellow card) 79'	Stadium: Republican Stadium; Attendance: 8,500; Referee: Bulat Sariyev (Kazakhstan)
Note: Noah played their home matches at Vazgen Sargsyan Republican Stadium, Yerevan, instead of their regular stadium, Armavir City Stadium, Armavir, which did not meet UEFA requirements.

19 December 2025 6	Dynamo Kyiv (Ukraine)	2–0	(Armenia) Noah	Lublin, Poland
00:00 (UTC+4)	Kabayev 27' (yellow card) 52'; Ponomarenko 50' (yellow card) 67'; Mykhavko (yellow card) 54'	Report	Jakoliš (yellow card) 45+1'; Muradyan (yellow card) 70'	Stadium: Arena Lublin; Attendance: 640; Referee: Juxhin Xhaja (Albania)
Note: Due to the Russian invasion of Ukraine, Ukrainian teams are required to play their home matches at neutral venues until further notice.

==== Knockout phase ====
19 February 2026 Knockout phase play-off 1st leg	Noah (Armenia)	1–0	(Netherlands) AZ	Yerevan, Armenia
21:45 (UTC+4)	Zolotić (yellow card) 24'; Sualehe (yellow card) 48'; Hambardzumyan 53'	Report	Goes (yellow card) 68'	Stadium: Republican Stadium; Attendance: 13,040; Referee: Orel Grinfeld (Israel)
Note: Noah played their home matches at Vazgen Sargsyan Republican Stadium, Yerevan, instead of their regular stadium, Armavir City Stadium, Armavir, which did not meet UEFA requirements.

27 February 2026 Knockout phase play-off 2nd leg	AZ (Netherlands)	4–0 (4–1 agg.)	(Armenia) Noah	Alkmaar, Netherlands
00:00 (UTC+4)	Daal 5'; Mijnans 39', 54' (yellow card) 44'; Dijkstra (yellow card) 69'; Boogaard (yellow card) 87'; Jensen 90+1'	Report	Muradyan (yellow card) 73'	Stadium: AFAS Stadion; Attendance: 11,531; Referee: Nikola Dabanović (Montenegro)

== Squad statistics ==
As of match played 27 May 2026

=== Appearances and goals ===
No.	Pos	Nat	Player	Total		Premier League		Armenian Cup		Supercup		Champions League		Europa League		Conference League	
No.	Pos	Nat	Player	Apps	Goals	Apps	Goals	Apps	Goals	Apps	Goals	Apps	Goals	Apps	Goals	Apps	Goals
3	DF	(Armenia) ARM	Sergey Muradyan	38	1	17+1	1	3	0	1	0	4	0	2	0	8+2	0
4	DF	(Belgium) BEL	Rob Nizet	9	0	4+5	0	0	0	0	0	0	0	0	0	0	0
6	DF	(Ghana) GHA	Eric Boakye	41	0	17+3	0	3+2	0	0+1	0	3	0	2	0	8+2	0
7	FW	(Portugal) POR	Hélder Ferreira	44	14	21+1	10	5	1	1	1	4	1	2	0	10	1
8	FW	(Portugal) POR	Gonçalo Gregório	3	0	0	0	0	0	0	0	3	0	0	0	0	0
9	FW	(Brazil) BRA	Matheus Aiás	36	13	9+8	10	1+2	0	0	0	1+3	1	2	0	5+5	2
10	MF	(Armenia) ARM	Gor Manvelyan	39	4	16+7	4	3+1	0	1	0	2+1	0	1+1	0	1+5	0
11	MF	(Netherlands) NED	Imran Oulad Omar	29	8	6+9	3	1+2	0	0	0	2+2	2	1+1	0	2+3	3
14	MF	(Japan) JPN	Takuto Oshima	38	2	16+6	2	3+1	0	0+1	0	0+2	0	0	0	7+2	0
16	GK	(Democratic Republic of the Congo) COD	Timothy Fayulu	10	0	4	0	1	0	0	0	0	0	0	0	5	0
17	MF	(Burkina Faso) BFA	Gustavo Sangaré	39	4	12+8	4	2+1	0	1	0	4	0	2	0	8+1	0
18	MF	(Armenia) ARM	Artyom Avanesyan	10	1	2+5	1	0+1	0	0+1	0	0	0	0	0	0+1	0
19	DF	(Armenia) ARM	Hovhannes Hambardzumyan	28	3	10+4	1	3+1	1	1	0	0+2	0	0+1	0	2+4	1
20	MF	(Romania) ROU	Valentin Costache	9	1	5	0	2+1	1	1	0	0	0	0	0	0	0
22	FW	(Armenia) ARM	Misak Hakobyan	2	0	0+2	0	0	0	0	0	0	0	0	0	0	0
23	MF	(Armenia) ARM	Aram Khamoyan	16	2	11+3	1	2	1	0	0	0	0	0	0	0	0
24	FW	(Armenia) ARM	Zaven Khudaverdyan	6	0	0+4	0	0+2	0	0	0	0	0	0	0	0	0
29	GK	(Brazil) BRA	Arthur Coneglian	15	0	12	0	3	0	0	0	0	0	0	0	0	0
32	FW	(Bosnia and Herzegovina) BIH	Nardin Mulahusejnović	43	16	18+7	10	4+1	1	1	0	0	0	0+2	0	7+3	5
33	DF	(Portugal) POR	David Sualehe	42	0	18+3	0	5	0	1	0	3+1	0	1	0	10	0
37	DF	(Portugal) POR	Gonçalo Silva	26	1	6+6	1	2+1	0	0	0	4	0	2	0	4+1	0
39	DF	(Guadeloupe) GLP	Nathanaël Saintini	33	3	19+2	2	3	1	1	0	0	0	0	0	8	0
44	DF	(Bosnia and Herzegovina) BIH	Nermin Zolotić	24	2	12+3	2	2+2	0	0	0	0+2	0	0	0	2+1	0
47	FW	(Croatia) CRO	Marin Jakoliš	43	8	20+3	4	2+3	3	0+1	0	0+4	0	0+2	0	5+3	1
57	FW	(Armenia) ARM	Albert Gareginyan	1	0	0+1	0	0	0	0	0	0	0	0	0	0	0
64	FW	(Armenia) ARM	Michael Asiryan	1	0	0+1	0	0	0	0	0	0	0	0	0	0	0
71	FW	(France) FRA	Bilal Fofana	8	0	2+5	0	0+1	0	0	0	0	0	0	0	0	0
88	MF	(Cameroon) CMR	Yan Eteki	33	1	11+2	0	3	0	1	0	4	0	2	1	8+2	0
92	GK	(Russia) RUS	Aleksey Ploshchadny	7	0	3	0	1	0	1	0	0	0	0	0	2	0
99	MF	(Armenia) ARM	Hovhannes Harutyunyan	18	1	7+6	0	1+1	0	0	0	0	0	0	0	0+3	1
Players away on loan:
Players who left Noah during the season:
4	DF	(Iceland) ISL	Guðmundur Þórarinsson	18	0	5+2	0	0	0	0	0	1+1	0	1+1	0	3+4	0
10	MF	(Armenia) ARM	Artak Dashyan	9	0	2+5	0	0	0	0	0	0+1	0	0+1	0	0	0
22	GK	(Armenia) ARM	Ognjen Čančarević	17	0	8	0	0	0	0	0	4	0	2	0	3	0
77	MF	(Croatia) CRO	Alen Grgić	20	2	3+7	0	0	0	0	0	4	2	1+1	0	2+2	0
93	FW	(France) FRA	Virgile Pinson	9	2	1+2	2	0	0	0	0	1+1	0	1+1	0	0+2	0

=== Goal scorers ===
Place	Position	Nation	Number	Name	Premier League	Armenian Cup	Supercup	Champions League	Europa League	Conference League	Total
1	FW	(Bosnia and Herzegovina)	32	Nardin Mulahusejnović	10	1	0	0	0	5	16
2	FW	(Portugal)	7	Hélder Ferreira	10	1	1	1	0	1	14
3	FW	(Brazil)	9	Matheus Aiás	10	0	0	1	0	2	13
4	FW	(Croatia)	47	Marin Jakoliš	4	3	0	0	0	1	8
4	MF	(Netherlands)	11	Imran Oulad Omar	3	0	0	2	0	3	8
6	MF	(Armenia)	27	Gor Manvelyan	4	0	0	0	0	0	4
6	MF	(Burkina Faso)	17	Gustavo Sangaré	4	0	0	0	0	0	4
8	DF	(Guadeloupe)	39	Nathanaël Saintini	2	1	0	0	0	0	3
8	DF	(Armenia)	19	Hovhannes Hambardzumyan	1	1	0	0	0	1	3
8				Own goal	2	0	0	1	0	0	3
11	FW	(France)	93	Virgile Pinson	2	0	0	0	0	0	2
11	DF	(Bosnia and Herzegovina)	44	Nermin Zolotić	2	0	0	0	0	0	2
11	MF	(Japan)	14	Takuto Oshima	2	0	0	0	0	0	2
11	MF	(Romania)	20	Valentin Costache	1	1	0	0	0	0	2
11	MF	(Armenia)	23	Aram Khamoyan	1	1	0	0	0	0	2
11	MF	(Croatia)	77	Alen Grgić	0	0	0	2	0	0	2
17	MF	(Portugal)	37	Gonçalo Silva	1	0	0	0	0	0	1
17	MF	(Armenia)	18	Artyom Avanesyan	1	0	0	0	0	0	1
17	DF	(Armenia)	3	Sergey Muradyan	0	1	0	0	0	0	1
17	MF	(Cameroon)	88	Yan Eteki	0	0	0	0	1	0	1
17	MF	(Armenia)	99	Hovhannes Harutyunyan	0	0	0	0	0	1	1
				TOTALS	61	9	1	7	1	14	93

=== Clean sheets ===
Place	Position	Nation	Number	Name	Premier League	Armenian Cup	Supercup	Champions League	Europa League	Conference League	Total
1	GK	(Brazil)	29	Arthur Coneglian	10	2	0	0	0	0	12
2	GK	(Armenia)	22	Ognjen Čančarević	4	0	0	1	1	0	6
3	GK	(Democratic Republic of the Congo)	16	Timothy Fayulu	1	0	0	0	0	1	2
3	GK	(Russia)	92	Aleksey Ploshchadny	1	0	0	0	0	1	2
				TOTALS	15	2	0	1	1	2	21

=== Disciplinary record ===
Number	Nation	Position	Name	Premier League		Armenian Cup		Supercup		Champions League		Europa League		Conference League		Total	
Number	Nation	Position	Name	Yellow card	Red card	Yellow card	Red card	Yellow card	Red card	Yellow card	Red card	Yellow card	Red card	Yellow card	Red card	Yellow card	Red card
3	(Armenia)	DF	Sergey Muradyan	2	0	0	0	0	0	0	0	1	0	3	0	6	0
4	(Belgium)	DF	Rob Nizet	2	0	0	0	0	0	0	0	0	0	0	0	2	0
6	(Ghana)	DF	Eric Boakye	0	0	0	0	0	0	1	0	0	0	0	0	1	0
7	(Portugal)	FW	Hélder Ferreira	6	0	0	0	0	0	1	0	0	0	1	0	8	0
8	(Portugal)	FW	Gonçalo Gregório	0	0	0	0	0	0	1	0	0	0	0	0	1	0
9	(Brazil)	FW	Matheus Aiás	0	0	0	0	0	0	0	0	1	0	1	0	2	0
10	(Armenia)	MF	Gor Manvelyan	6	0	0	0	0	0	0	0	0	0	0	0	6	0
11	(Netherlands)	MF	Imran Oulad Omar	1	0	0	0	0	0	0	0	1	0	1	0	3	0
14	(Japan)	MF	Takuto Oshima	6	0	1	0	0	0	0	0	0	0	0	0	7	0
17	(Burkina Faso)	MF	Gustavo Sangaré	4	0	1	0	0	0	1	0	2	0	2	0	10	0
18	(Armenia)	MF	Artyom Avanesyan	2	0	0	0	0	0	0	0	0	0	0	0	2	0
19	(Armenia)	DF	Hovhannes Hambardzumyan	6	0	1	0	0	0	0	0	0	0	0	0	7	0
23	(Armenia)	MF	Aram Khamoyan	4	0	2	0	0	0	0	0	0	0	0	0	6	0
29	(Brazil)	GK	Arthur Coneglian	1	0	2	0	0	0	0	0	0	0	0	0	3	0
32	(Bosnia and Herzegovina)	FW	Nardin Mulahusejnović	1	1	1	0	0	0	0	0	1	0	2	0	5	1
33	(Portugal)	DF	David Sualehe	4	2	1	0	0	0	2	0	0	0	2	0	9	2
37	(Portugal)	DF	Gonçalo Silva	2	0	0	0	0	0	0	0	1	0	0	0	3	0
39	(Guadeloupe)	DF	Nathanaël Saintini	3	1	1	0	0	0	0	0	0	0	1	0	5	1
44	(Bosnia and Herzegovina)	DF	Nermin Zolotić	3	0	1	0	0	0	0	0	0	0	1	0	5	0
47	(Croatia)	FW	Marin Jakoliš	2	1	0	0	0	0	1	0	0	0	2	0	5	1
71	(France)	FW	Bilal Fofana	1	1	0	0	0	0	0	0	0	0	0	0	1	1
88	(Cameroon)	MF	Yan Eteki	5	0	1	0	0	0	0	0	1	0	1	0	8	0
99	(Armenia)	MF	Hovhannes Harutyunyan	2	0	0	0	0	0	0	0	0	0	0	0	2	0
Players away on loan:
Players who left Noah during the season:
4	(Iceland)	DF	Guðmundur Þórarinsson	2	0	0	0	0	0	1	0	0	0	0	0	3	0
10	(Armenia)	MF	Artak Dashyan	1	0	0	0	0	0	0	0	0	0	0	0	1	0
22	(Armenia)	GK	Ognjen Čančarević	2	0	0	0	0	0	0	0	0	0	0	0	2	0
77	(Croatia)	MF	Alen Grgić	0	0	0	0	0	0	1	0	0	0	0	0	1	0
93	(France)	FW	Virgile Pinson	0	1	0	0	0	0	1	0	1	0	0	0	2	1
			TOTALS	68	6	12	1	0	0	10	0	9	0	17	0	116	7
