= 2026 Armenian Cup final =

- Event: 2025–26 Armenian Cup
Urartu	Noah
2	4
- Date: 14 May 2026
- Venue: Republican Stadium, Yerevan
- Referee: Erik Lambrechts

The 2026 Armenian Cup final was the 35th Armenian Cup Final, and the final match of the 2025–26 Armenian Cup. It was played at the Republican Stadium in Yerevan, Armenia, on 14 May 2026, and contested by Noah and Urartu.

== Match ==
=== Details ===
14 May 2026
19:00 (UTC+4)

Urartu	2–4	Noah
Mirzoyan 10'; Vardanyan 75'	Report	Ferreira 26'; Jakoliš 45+1', 52'; Saintini 57'

Republican Stadium, Yerevan
Referee: Erik Lambrechts

Urartu	Noah

GK	92	(Russia) Aleksandr Mishiyev
DF	88	(Armenia) Zhirayr Margaryan
DF	3	(Armenia) Erik Piloyan
DF	4	(Armenia) Arman Ghazaryan
DF	99	(Armenia) Khariton Ayvazyan		(substituted off) 57'
DF	18	(Ukraine) Anton Bratkov
MF	6	(Brazil) Alef Santos	(yellow card) 45'	(substituted off) 64'
MF	10	(Armenia) Karen Melkonyan		(substituted off) 57'
MF	8	(Armenia) Narek Agasaryan
MF	30	(Brazil) Bruno Michel		(substituted off) 87'
MF	22	(Armenia) Mikayel Mirzoyan		(substituted off) 57'
Substitutes:
GK	33	(Montenegro) Andrija Dragojević
GK	55	(Armenia) Erik Simonyan
FW	9	(France) Alexandre Llovet
MF	14	(Ukraine) Artem Polyarus		(substituted on) 87'
MF	7	(Armenia) Sergey Mkrtchyan		(substituted on) 87'
MF	24	(Armenia) Levon Bashoyan
MF	77	(Armenia) Artur Israelyan
MF	90	(Russia) Oleg Polyakov
MF	2	(Russia) Artemi Gunko
FW	27	(Portugal) Miguel Velosa
FW	23	(Armenia) Nicholas Kaloukian
FW	21	(Armenia) Edik Vardanyan
Manager:
(Armenia) Robert Arzumanyan

GK	92	(Russia) Aleksey Ploshchadny
DF	19	(Armenia) Hovhannes Hambardzumyan	(substituted off) 73'
DF	44	(Bosnia and Herzegovina) Nermin Zolotić
DF	39	(Guadeloupe) Nathanaël Saintini
DF	33	(Portugal) David Sualehe
MF	10	(Armenia) Gor Manvelyan
MF	99	(Armenia) Hovhannes Harutyunyan	(substituted off) 84'
MF	14	(Japan) Takuto Oshima
FW	47	(Croatia) Marin Jakoliš	(substituted off) 68'
FW	32	(Bosnia and Herzegovina) Nardin Mulahusejnović	(substituted off) 73'
FW	7	(Portugal) Hélder Ferreira	(substituted off) 84'
Substitutes:
GK	1	(Armenia) Albert Avetisov
DF	4	(Belgium) Rob Nizet
DF	6	(Ghana) Eric Boakye	(substituted on) 68'
FW	22	(Armenia) Misak Hakobyan
MF	18	(Armenia) Artyom Avanesyan	(substituted on) 73'
MF	11	(Netherlands) Imran Oulad Omar
MF	17	(Burkina Faso) Gustavo Sangaré	(substituted on) 84'
MF	88	(Cameroon) Yan Eteki
FW	24	(Armenia) Zaven Khudaverdyan	(substituted on) 84'
FW	57	(Armenia) Albert Gareginyan
FW	9	(Brazil) Matheus Aiás	(substituted on) 73'
FW	74	(Armenia) Michael Asiryan
Manager:
(Croatia) Sandro Perković

Man of the Match:

Assistant referees:
Mathias Hillaert
Jock De Weirdt
Fourth official:
Zaven Hovhannisyan
VAR:
Artem Gasparyan
VAR assistant:
Atom Sevgulyan

Match rules

- 90 minutes
- 30 minutes of extra time if necessary
- Penalty shoot-out if scores still level
- Twelve named substitutes
- Maximum of five substitutions, with a sixth allowed in extra time
