= Fayulu =

Fayulu is a surname. Notable people with the surname include:

- Martin Fayulu (born 1956), Congolese businessman and lawmaker
- Timothy Fayulu (born 1999), Congolese footballer
