= 2025 Armenian Supercup =

Noah	Ararat-Armenia
1	1
- Date: 12 March 2026
- Venue: Republican Stadium, Yerevan
- Referee: Zaven Hovhannisyan

The 2025 Armenian Supercup is the 27th Armenian Supercup, an annual football match played between the previous season's Premier League & Armenian Cup winners, Noah and the previous season's League & Cup runnersup, Ararat-Armenia.

== Background ==
On 3 March 2026, the Football Federation of Armenia announced that the 2025 Armenian Supercup would be played on 12 March 2026 by Noah and Ararat-Armenia at the Republican Stadium.

== Match ==
=== Details ===
12 March 2026
19:00 (UTC+4)

Noah	1 – 1 (a.e.t.)	Ararat-Armenia
Ferreira 37' (pen.)	Report	Banjaqui 10'
Penalties
Ferreira (penalty scored); Manvelyan (penalty scored); Jakoliš (penalty scored); Mulahusejnović (penalty scored)	4–2	(penalty scored) Oliveira; (penalty scored) Ayongo; (penalty missed) Eloyan; (penalty missed) Shaghoyan

Republican Stadium, Yerevan
Referee: Zaven Hovhannisyan

Noah	Ararat-Armenia

GK	92	(Russia) Aleksey Ploshchadny
DF	3	(Armenia) Sergey Muradyan
DF	19	(Armenia) Hovhannes Hambardzumyan	(substituted off) 76'
DF	33	(Portugal) David Sualehe
DF	39	(Guadeloupe) Nathanaël Saintini
MF	10	(Armenia) Gor Manvelyan
MF	17	(Burkina Faso) Gustavo Sangaré	(substituted off) 76'
MF	20	(Romania) Valentin Costache	(substituted off) 62'
MF	88	(Cameroon) Yan Eteki	(substituted off) 90+1'
FW	7	(Portugal) Hélder Ferreira
FW	32	(Bosnia and Herzegovina) Nardin Mulahusejnović
Substitutes:
GK	29	(Brazil) Arthur Coneglian
DF	44	(Bosnia and Herzegovina) Nermin Zolotić
DF	6	(Ghana) Eric Boakye	(substituted on) 76'
DF	4	(Belgium) Rob Nizet
DF	37	(Portugal) Gonçalo Silva
MF	14	(Japan) Takuto Oshima	(substituted on) 90+1'
MF	99	(Armenia) Hovhannes Harutyunyan
MF	23	(Armenia) Aram Khamoyan
FW	17	(Armenia) Artyom Avanesyan	(substituted on) 76'
FW	22	(Armenia) Misak Hakobyan
FW	24	(Armenia) Zaven Khudaverdyan
FW	47	(Croatia) Marin Jakoliš	(substituted on) 62'
Manager:
(Croatia) Sandro Perković

GK	24	(Portugal) Bruno Pinto
DF	3	(Colombia) Junior Bueno	(yellow card) 80'
DF	4	(Portugal) João Queirós
DF	13	(Armenia) Kamo Hovhannisyan
DF	16	(Armenia) Edgar Grigoryan		(substituted off) 90'
DF	33	(Morocco) Bouchaib Arrassi
MF	11	(Guinea) Zidane Banjaqui		(substituted off) 76'
MF	19	(Armenia) Karen Muradyan	(yellow card) 38'
MF	20	(Kenya) Alwyn Tera		(substituted off) 67'
FW	25	(Senegal) Alioune Ndour	(yellow card) 71'	(substituted off) 76'
FW	77	(Armenia) Artur Serobyan		(substituted off) 90'
Substitutes:
GK	1	(Armenia) Arman Nersesyan
GK	12	(Armenia) Shirak Badalyan
DF	2	(Portugal) Hugo Oliveira		(substituted on) 90'
DF	5	(Armenia) Hakob Hakobyan
MF	10	(Russia) Armen Ambartsumyan		(substituted on) 67'
MF	26	(Armenia) Martun Hovhannisyan
MF	36	(Armenia) Vahram Makhsudyan
MF	44	(Armenia) Vahe Petrosyan
MF	88	(Brazil) Welton
FW	7	(Armenia) Zhirayr Shaghoyan		(substituted on) 76'
FW	9	(Armenia) Arayik Eloyan		(substituted on) 76'
FW	90	(Ghana) Paul Ayongo		(substituted on) 90'
Manager:
(Portugal) Tulipa

Assistant referees:
Artur Gdlyan
Vanik Simonyan
Fourth official:
Vanik Simonyan
Video assistant referee:
Ashot Ghaltakhchyan
Mesrop Ghazaryan

== See also ==
- 2024–25 Armenian Premier League
- 2024–25 Armenian Cup
