= Guðmundur Þórarinsson =

Icelandic footballer (born 1992)

Personal information
- Date of birth: 15 April 1992 (age 34)
- Place of birth: Selfoss, Iceland
- Height: 1.83 m (6 ft 0 in)
- Positions: Left-back; left midfielder

Team information
- Current team: ÍA
- Number: 8

Youth career
- 2008: Selfoss

Senior career*
Years	Team	Apps	(Gls)
2008–2010	Selfoss	36	(5)
2011–2012	ÍBV	43	(2)
2013–2014	Sarpsborg 08	59	(7)
2015–2016	Nordsjælland	35	(1)
2016–2017	Rosenborg	24	(1)
2017–2019	IFK Norrköping	84	(4)
2020–2021	New York City	43	(2)
2022	AaB	6	(0)
2022–2024	OFI	57	(2)
2024–2026	Noah	21	(2)
2026–	ÍA	22	(0)

International career^{‡}
2008	Iceland U17	5	(0)
2009–2010	Iceland U19	13	(3)
2011–2014	Iceland U21	14	(0)
2014–	Iceland	16	(0)
- * Club domestic league appearances and goals as of 1 November 2026 ‡ National team caps and goals as of 18 March 2026

Guðmundur "Gudi" Þórarinsson (born 15 April 1992) is an Icelandic professional footballer who plays as a left-back or left-midfielder for Besta deild karla club ÍA and the Iceland national team. He is also a well-known singer in Iceland.

== Club career ==
On 28 January 2020, Guðmundur joined Major League Soccer side New York City on a free transfer from Swedish first division club IFK Norrköping. Following the 2021 season, New York City opted to decline their contract option on Guðmundur.

On 8 July 2024, Armenian Premier League club FC Noah announced the signing of Guðmundur. On 7 June, Noah announced that they had extended their contract with Guðmundur for another season.

On 18 January 2026, Besta deild karla club ÍA announced the signing of Guðmundur to a two-year contract.

== Career statistics ==
=== Club ===
As of match played on 10 July 2026

Appearances and goals by club, season and competition
Club	Season	League			Cup (Note: Includes Icelandic Men's Football Cup, Norwegian Football Cup, Danish Cup, Svenska Cupen, Greek Football Cup)		Continental		Other		Total	
Club	Season	Division	Apps	Goals	Apps	Goals	Apps	Goals	Apps	Goals	Apps	Goals
Selfoss	2008	1. deild karla	2	0	0	0	—		—		2	0
Selfoss	2009	1. deild karla	18	4	0	0	—		—		18	4
Selfoss	2010	Úrvalsdeild	16	1	0	0	—		—		16	1
Selfoss	Total		36	5	0	0	0	0	0	0	36	5
IBV	2011	Úrvalsdeild	22	0	4	0	2 (Note: Appearance(s) in UEFA Europa League)	0	—		28	0
IBV	2012	Úrvalsdeild	21	2	3	0	2	0	—		26	2
IBV	Total		43	2	7	0	4	0	0	0	54	2
Sarpsborg 08	2013	Tippeligaen	30	3	0	0	—		2 (Note: Appearance(s) in Tippeligaen Playoffs)	0	30	3
Sarpsborg 08	2014	Tippeligaen	29	4	3	1	—		—		32	5
Sarpsborg 08	Total		59	7	3	1	0	0	2	0	64	8
Nordsjælland	2014–15	Danish Superliga	15	0	0	0	—		—		15	0
Nordsjælland	2015–16	Danish Superliga	20	1	0	0	—		—		20	1
Nordsjælland	Total		35	1	0	0	0	0	0	0	35	1
Rosenborg	2016	Tippeligaen	24	1	2	0	2 (Note: Appearance(s) in UEFA Champions League)	0	—		28	1
Norrköping	2017	Allsvenskan	27	2	1	0	4	0	—		32	2
Norrköping	2018	Allsvenskan	29	2	3	0	—		—		32	2
Norrköping	2019	Allsvenskan	28	0	3	0	6	0	—		37	0
Norrköping	Total		84	4	7	0	10	0	0	0	101	4
New York City	2020	MLS	19	0	—		1 (Note: Appearance(s) in CONCACAF Champions Cup)	0	1 (Note: Appearance(s) in MLS Cup Playoffs)	0	21	0
New York City	2021	MLS	24	2	—		1 (Note: Appearance(s) in Leagues Cup)	0	3	0	28	2
New York City	Total		43	2	—		2	0	4	0	49	2
AaB	2021–22	Danish Superliga	6	0	0	0	—		—		6	0
OFI	2022-23	Super League Greece	27	0	1	0	—		—		28	0
OFI	2023-24	Super League Greece	30	2	3	0	—		—		33	2
OFI	Total		57	2	4	0	—		—		61	2
Noah	2024–25	Armenian Premier League	14	2	3	0	9 (Note: Appearance(s) in the UEFA Conference League)	0	—		26	2
Noah	2025–26	Armenian Premier League	7	0	0	0	11 (Note: Two appearances in the UEFA Champions League, two appearances in the UEFA Europa League, and seven appearances in the UEFA Conference League)	0	0	0	18	0
Noah	Total		21	2	3	0	20	0	—		44	2
ÍA	2026	Besta deild karla	12	0	3	0	—		—		15	0
Career totals			420	26	29	1	38	0	6	0	293	27

=== International ===
As of match played 25 February 2026

Appearances and goals by national team and year
National team	Year	Apps	Goals
Iceland	2014	1	0
Iceland	2015	1	0
Iceland	2016	1	0
Iceland	2017	0	0
Iceland	2018	0	0
Iceland	2019	2	0
Iceland	2020	0	0
Iceland	2021	7	0
Iceland	2022	0	0
Iceland	2023	1	0
Iceland	2024	2	0
Iceland	2025	0	0
Iceland	2026	1	0
Total		16	0

== Honours ==
Selfoss

- 1. deild: 2009

Rosenborg

- Norwegian League: 2016
- Norwegian Football Cup: 2016

New York City

- MLS Cup: 2021

Noah

- Armenian Premier League: 2024–25
- Armenian Cup: 2024–25

== Music career ==
Guðmundur is known as a good singer, and is the brother of Icelandic singer Ingó Veðurguð. In 2018 he entered the yearly edition of Söngvakeppnin, a preliminary competition to choose Iceland's representative for the Eurovision Song Contest 2018. He is also part of a New York-based band named Maybe Jesse.
