= Matheus Aiás =

Brazilian footballer (born 1996)

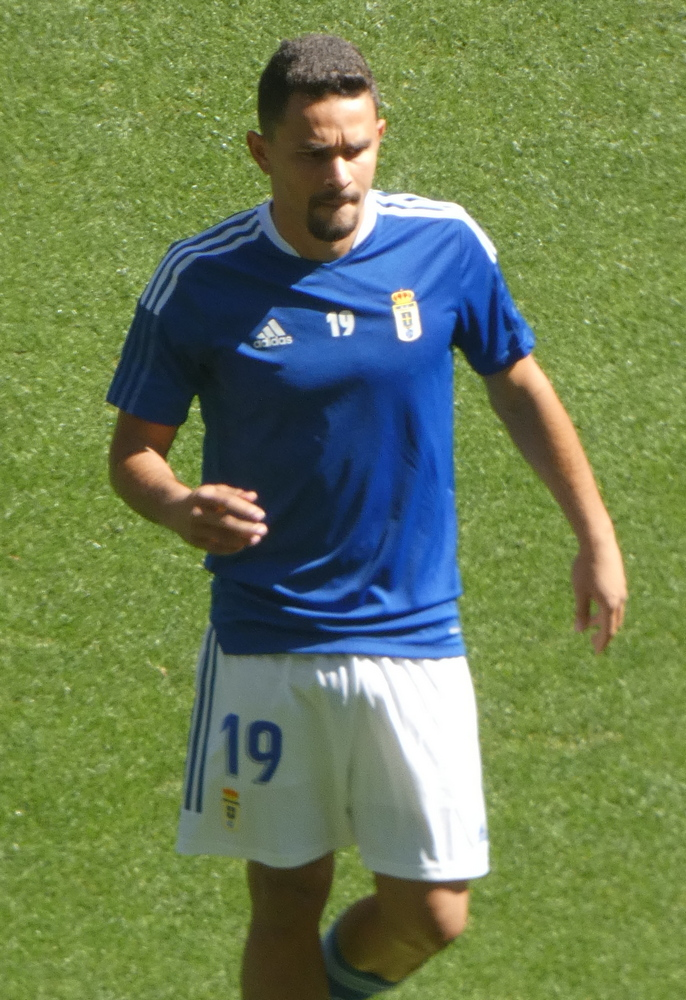
- Aiás for Real Oviedo in 2021

Personal information
- Full name: Matheus Aiás Barrozo Rodrigues
- Date of birth: 30 December 1996 (age 29)
- Place of birth: Palmares Paulista, Brazil
- Height: 1.75 m (5 ft 9 in)
- Position: Striker

Team information
- Current team: Jeju SK
- Number: 9

Youth career
- Cruzeiro
- 2013–2014: Ponte Preta
- 2014–2015: Udinese

Senior career*
Years	Team	Apps	(Gls)
2015–2017	Granada B	53	(18)
2017	→ Lorca (loan)	2	(1)
2017–2020	Watford	0	(0)
2017–2018	→ Fuenlabrada (loan)	14	(3)
2018	→ Valencia B (loan)	3	(0)
2018–2020	→ Mirandés (loan)	61	(14)
2020–2022	Orlando City	6	(1)
2021–2022	→ Real Oviedo (loan)	26	(2)
2022–2023	Racing Santander	35	(3)
2023–2024	Moreirense	18	(2)
2024–2026	Noah	38	(19)
2026–	Jeju SK	0	(0)
- * Club domestic league appearances and goals as of 13 July 2026

Matheus Aiás Barrozo Rodrigues (born 30 December 1996), known as Matheus Aiás, is a Brazilian professional footballer who plays as a striker, for K League 1 club Jeju SK.

== Career ==
=== Early years ===
Born in Palmares Paulista, São Paulo, Matheus played in the youth teams at Cruzeiro and Ponte Preta. In January 2014 he agreed to a deal with Italian Serie A side Udinese from Ponte Preta's under-17 squad. He was later assigned to Granada CF, a club in the same ownership group as Udinese in Giampaolo Pozzo, joining their reserve team in November 2014 but could only be registered the following January after he turned 18. Matheus made his senior debut on 15 March 2015, playing the last 12 minutes in a 0–1 Segunda División B away loss against Arroyo CP. His first goal came on 4 October 2015, as he scored the opener in a 1–1 home draw against Mérida AD.

On 27 April 2017, Matheus joined fellow third division side Lorca FC on loan for two months, as an injury replacement to Chumbi, helping the team win promotion to the Segunda División via the playoffs for the first time in the team's history.

In July 2017, now owned by Watford, another club of the Pozzo ownership family, Matheus returned to the Spanish third division on loan with CF Fuenlabrada.

On 30 January 2018, Matheus was loaned to Valencia CF Mestalla.

=== Mirandés ===
On 22 August 2018, Matheus agreed to a one-year loan deal with fellow third division CD Mirandés, achieving promotion at the end of the 2018–19 season. His loan was renewed for a further season as the team entered LaLiga 2. He made his professional debut on 17 August, starting in a 2–2 away draw against Rayo Vallecano. During the team's run to the 2019–20 Copa del Rey semi-finals, Matheus finished as the competition's second-highest scorer behind Alexander Isak and became the first player in a decade to score against four different La Liga opponents for a team in a lower division after netting against RC Celta de Vigo, Sevilla FC, Villarreal CF and Real Sociedad. Only Lionel Messi and Luis Suárez had done so in that time.

=== Orlando City ===
On 21 August 2020, Matheus signed a two-and-a-half-year deal with MLS side Orlando City SC. After a two-month delay, Matheus was eventually able to make his debut on October 24 as a stoppage-time substitute in a 2–1 defeat to Inter Miami. He scored his first goal for the club in the following game, a 4–1 rivalry win against Atlanta United.

Having only played for a combined 31 minutes for Orlando City, Matheus returned to the Spanish Segunda División on loan with Real Oviedo on 4 July 2021 ahead of the 2021–22 season with an option to buy. He made his Oviedo debut on 20 August 2021, as a 67th-minute substitute in a 2–1 defeat to Almería.

=== Racing Santander ===
On 8 July 2022, it was announced Aias had moved to newly-promoted Segunda División team Racing de Santander for an undisclosed transfer fee. On 25 August 2023, Racing announced that his contract had been terminated by mutual agreement.

=== Moreirense ===
On 28 August 2023, recently-promoted to Primeira Liga side Moreirense announced the signing of Aiás on a one-year contract.

=== Noah ===
On 30 June 2024, Armenian Premier League club Noah announced the signing of Aiás. On 4 June 2026, Noah announced that Aiás had left the club after his contract had expired.

=== Jeju SK ===
On 12 July 2026, K League 1 club Jeju SK announced the signing of Aiás.

== Career statistics ==
As of match played 27 May 2026

Appearances and goals by club, season and competition
Club	Season	League			National cup		League cup		Continental		Other		Total	
Club	Season	Division	Apps	Goals	Apps	Goals	Apps	Goals	Apps	Goals	Apps	Goals	Apps	Goals
Granada B	2014–15	Segunda División B	3	0	—		—		—		—		3	0
Granada B	2015–16	Segunda División B	17	2	—		—		—		—		17	2
Granada B	2016–17	Segunda División B	33	16	—		—		—		—		33	16
Granada B	Total		53	18	—		—		—		—		53	18
Lorca (loan)	2016–17	Segunda División B	2	1	0	0	—		—		2 (Note: Appearances in 2017 Segunda División B play-offs.)	0	4	1
Watford	2017–18	Premier League	0	0	0	0	—		—		0	0	0	0
Fuenlabrada (loan)	2017–18	Segunda División B	14	3	2	0	—		—		—		16	3
Valencia B (loan)	2017–18	Segunda División B	3	0	—		—		—		—		3	0
Mirandés (loan)	2018–19	Segunda División B	34	8	1	0	—		—		5 (Note: Appearances in 2019 Segunda División B play-offs.)	3	40	11
Mirandés (loan)	2019–20	Segunda División	27	6	7	6	—		—		—		34	12
Mirandés (loan)	Total		61	14	8	6	—		—		5	3	74	23
Orlando City	2020	MLS	4	1	—		—		—		—		4	1
Orlando City	2021	MLS	2	0	—		—		—		—		2	0
Orlando City	Total		6	1	—		—		—		—		6	1
Real Oviedo (loan)	2021–22	Segunda División	26	2	1	0	—		—		—		27	2
Racing Santander	2022–23	Segunda División	34	3	1	0	—		—		—		35	3
Racing Santander	2023–24	Segunda División	1	0	0	0	—		—		—		1	0
Racing Santander	Total		35	3	1	0	—		—		—		36	3
Moreirense	2023–24	Primeira Liga	18	2	1	0	0	0	-		-		19	2
Noah	2024–25	Armenian Premier League	21	9	6	4	-		14 (Note: Appearances and goals in the UEFA Conference League)	6	-		41	19
Noah	2025–26	Armenian Premier League	17	10	3	0	-		16 (Note: Four appearances and one goal in the UEFA Champions League, two appearances in the UEFA Europa League, and six appearances and one goal in the UEFA Conference League.)	3	0	0	36	13
Noah	Total		38	19	9	4	—		30	9	0	0	77	32
Career total			256	63	21	10	0	0	30	9	7	3	315	85

== Honours ==
Noah

- Armenian Premier League: 2024–25
- Armenian Cup: 2024–25, 2025–26
