= Aram Khamoyan =

Armenian footballer (born 2000)

Personal information
- Date of birth: 10 January 2000 (age 26)
- Place of birth: Verin Bazmaberd, Armenia
- Height: 1.78 m (5 ft 10 in)
- Position: Central midfielder

Team information
- Current team: Noah
- Number: 23

Youth career
- –2017: Banants U-18

Senior career*
Years	Team	Apps	(Gls)
2017–2018	Banants	5	(0)
2017–2018	→ Banants II (loan)	4	(0)
2018–2019	Lokomotiv Yerevan	16	(0)
2019–2021	Ararat-Armenia	0	(0)
2019–2020	→ Ararat-Armenia-2 (loan)	26	(3)
2021–2025	BKMA Yerevan	108	(4)
2025–	Noah	21	(1)

International career^{‡}
2016–2017	Armenia U17	10	(0)
2017–2018	Armenia U18	2	(0)
2018–2019	Armenia U19	18	(0)
2019–2022	Armenia U21	16	(0)
2026–	Armenia	1	(0)
- * Club domestic league appearances and goals as of 12 September 2026 ‡ National team caps and goals as of 9 June 2026

Aram Khamoyan (Armenian: Արամ Խամոյան; born 10 January 2000) is an Armenian football player who plays as a central midfielder for Armenian Premier League club Noah and the Armenia national team.

== Club career ==
In July 2019, Khamoyan moved to Ararat-Armenia.

Later, he joined BKMA Yerevan and played his 100th game for the club on April 18, 2025.

After four seasons with BKMA, Khamoyan moved to Noah.

== International career ==
Khamoyan represented Armenia at the 2019 UEFA European Under-19 Championship.

On 26 August 2024, he received his first call-up to the Armenian senior national team for a UEFA Nations League matches against Latvia and North Macedonia respectively.

Khamoyan made his debut for Armenia national team on 9 June 2026 in a friendly against Moldova as a late substitution.
