= Gustavo Sangaré =

Burkinabé footballer (born 1996)

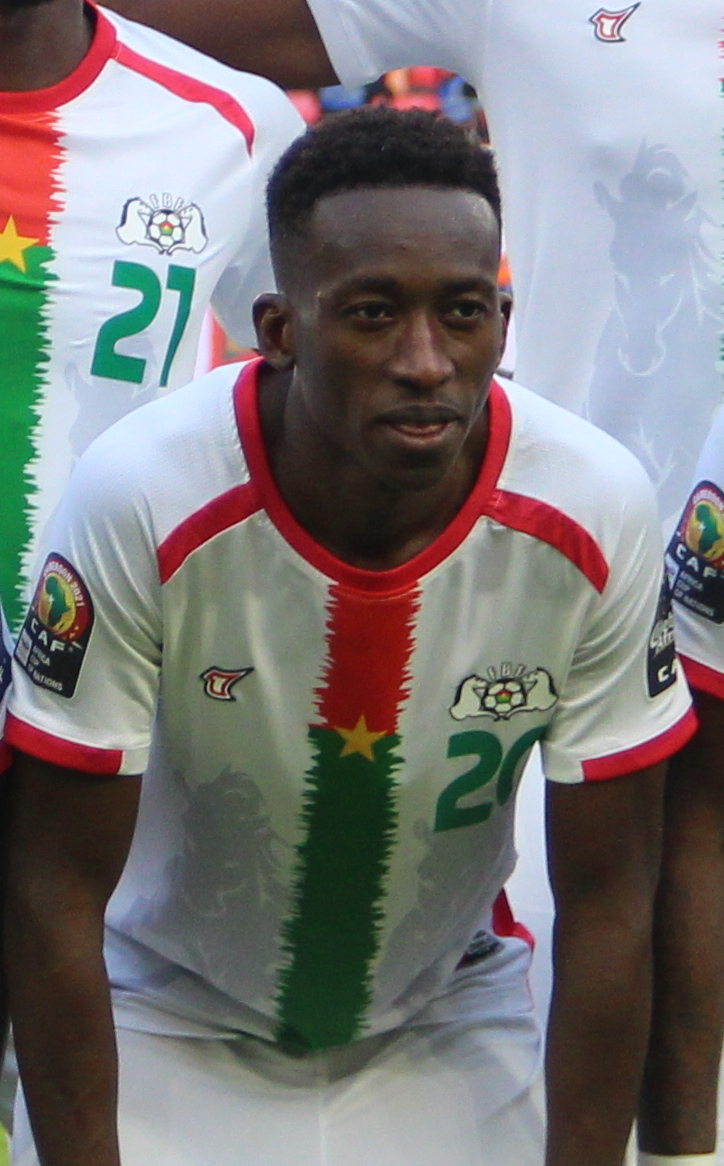
- Sangaré with Burkina Faso in 2022

Personal information
- Full name: Gustavo Fabrice Sangaré
- Date of birth: 8 November 1996 (age 30)
- Place of birth: Bobo-Dioulasso, Burkina Faso
- Height: 1.80 m (5 ft 11 in)
- Position: Midfielder

Team information
- Current team: Noah
- Number: 17

Youth career
- Salitas
- 2017–2018: Frontignan

Senior career*
Years	Team	Apps	(Gls)
2018–2024	Quevilly-Rouen II	30	(4)
2019–2024	Quevilly-Rouen	139	(7)
2024–	Noah	38	(4)

International career^{‡}
2021–	Burkina Faso	36	(1)
- * Club domestic league appearances and goals as of 18 June 2026 ‡ National team caps and goals as of 16 June 2024

Gustavo Fabrice Sangaré (born 8 November 1996) is a Burkinabé professional footballer who plays as a midfielder for Armenian Premier League club Noah and the Burkina Faso national team.

== Club career ==
A youth product of Salitas and Frontignan, Sangaré joined the reserve side Quevilly-Rouen in 2018. In 2019, he was promoted to their first team in the Championnat National.

On 1 July 2024, Armenian Premier League club Noah announced the signing of Sangaré from Quevilly-Rouen. On 3 June 2025, Noah announced that they had extended their contract with Sangaré for another two-years with an option for a third.

== International career ==
Sangaré received his first callup to the senior Burkina Faso national team in May 2021. He debuted with Burkina Faso in a 1–0 friendly loss to Morocco on 12 June 2021. Gustavo Sangaré featured in the 2021 Africa Cup of Nations third place match against Cameroon.

On 20 December 2023, Sangaré was named among the 27 players selected by Hubert Velud to represent Burkina Faso at the 2023 Africa Cup of Nations.

On 8 December 2025, Sangaré was named among the 25 players selected by head coach Brama Traoré to represent Burkina Faso at the 2025 Africa Cup of Nations.

== Career statistics ==
=== Club ===
As of match played 6 May 2026

Appearances and goals by club, season and competition
Club	Season	League			National cup (Note: Includes Armenian Cup)		League cup		Continental		Other		Total	
Club	Season	Division	Apps	Goals	Apps	Goals	Apps	Goals	Apps	Goals	Apps	Goals	Apps	Goals
Noah	2024–25	Armenian Premier League	18	0	3	0	—		13 (Note: Appearances and goals in the UEFA Conference League)	0	—		34	0
Noah	2025–26	Armenian Premier League	16	3	2	0	—		15 (Note: Four appearances in the UEFA Champions League, two appearances in the UEFA Europa League and nine appearances in the UEFA Conference League)	0	1 (Note: Appearances and goals in the Armenian Supercup)	0	34	3
Noah	Total		34	3	5	0	-	-	28	0	1	0	68	3
Career total			34	3	5	0	-	-	28	0	1	0	68	3

As of match played 9 January 2022
Scores and results list Burkina Faso's goal tally first, score column indicates score after each Sangaré goal.

List of international goals scored by Gustavo Sangaré
No.	Date	Venue	Opponent	Score	Result	Competition
1	9 January 2022	Paul Biya Stadium, Yaoundé, Cameroon	Cameroon	1–0	1–2	2021 Africa Cup of Nations

== Honours ==
Noah

- Armenian Cup: 2025–26
- Armenian Supercup: 2025
