= Ilya Serikov =

Russian footballer

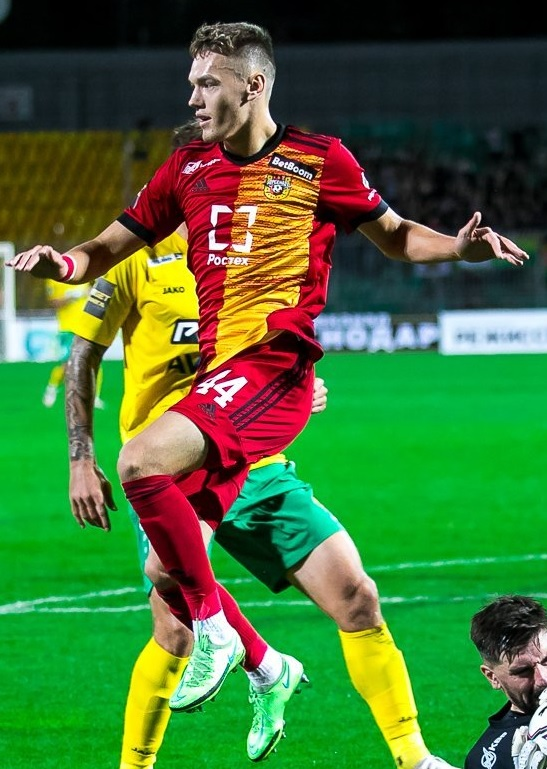
- Serikov with Arsenal Tula in 2022

Personal information
- Full name: Ilya Andreyevich Serikov
- Date of birth: 4 March 1995 (age 31)
- Place of birth: Kostroma, Russia
- Height: 1.84 m (6 ft 0 in)
- Position: Defender

Team information
- Current team: Budućnost Podgorica
- Number: 5

Youth career
- –2010: Spartak Kostroma
- 2010–2014: Shinnik Yaroslavl

Senior career*
Years	Team	Apps	(Gls)
2014–2016	Shinnik Yaroslavl	4	(0)
2014	→ Spartak Kostroma (loan)	13	(0)
2015–2016	→ Dynamo St. Petersburg (loan)	27	(4)
2016–2017	Dynamo St. Petersburg	8	(0)
2017	→ Chayka Peschanokopskoye (loan)	14	(1)
2017	Chayka Peschanokopskoye	18	(2)
2018–2020	Sokol Saratov	49	(6)
2020–2022	Tver	55	(4)
2022–2023	Arsenal Tula	25	(0)
2022–2023	Arsenal-2 Tula	1	(1)
2023–2024	Sokol Saratov	31	(0)
2024–	Budućnost Podgorica	64	(6)
- * Club domestic league appearances and goals as of 17 June 2026

Ilya Andreyevich Serikov (Russian: Илья Андреевич Сериков; born 4 March 1995) is a Russian professional footballer who plays as a defender for Montenegrin First League club Budućnost.

== Club career ==
He made his professional debut in the Russian Professional Football League for Spartak Kostroma on 8 August 2014 in a game against Zenit-2 St. Petersburg.

He made his Russian Football National League debut for Shinnik Yaroslavl on 29 March 2015 in a game against SKA-Energiya Khabarovsk.
