= Nermin Zolotić =

Bosnian footballer (born 1993)

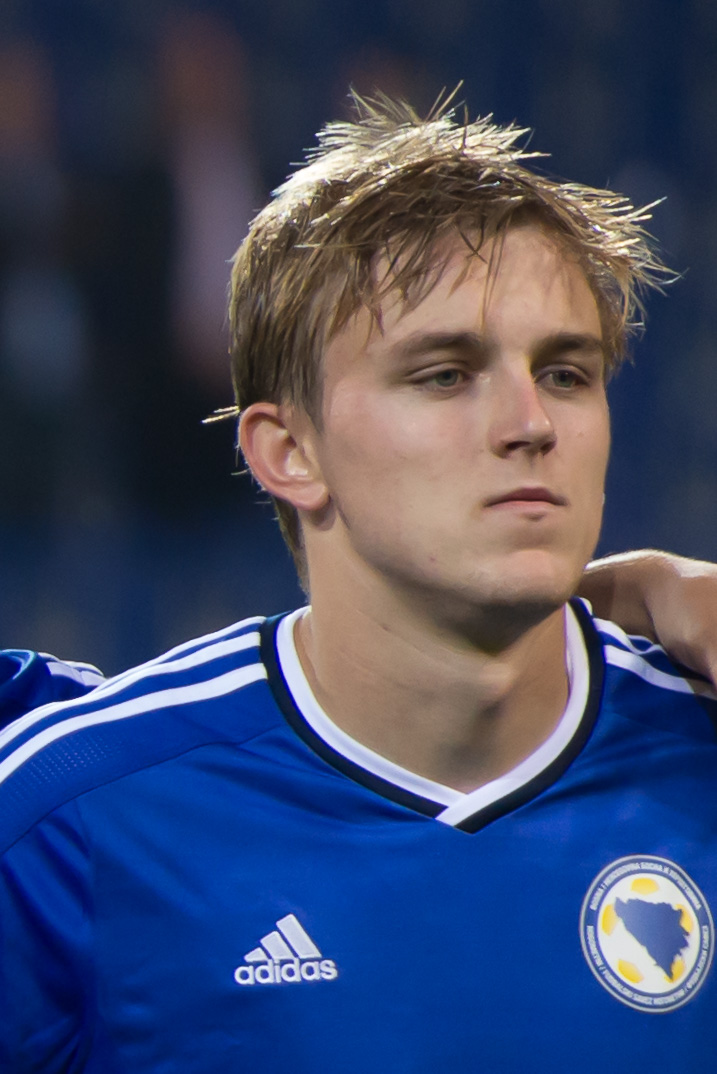
- Zolotić with Bosnia and Herzegovina U21 in 2014

Personal information
- Date of birth: 7 July 1993 (age 33)
- Place of birth: Sarajevo, Bosnia and Herzegovina
- Height: 1.88 m (6 ft 2 in)
- Position: Centre-back

Team information
- Current team: Farense
- Number: 44

Youth career
- Željezničar

Senior career*
| Years | Team | Apps | (Gls) |
| 2011–2014 | Željezničar | 46 | (1) |
| 2014–2016 | Gent | 4 | (0) |
| 2015 | → Istra 1961 (loan) | 13 | (0) |
| 2016 | → Željezničar (loan) | 7 | (0) |
| 2016–2020 | Roeselare | 100 | (3) |
| 2020–2025 | Casa Pia | 120 | (2) |
| 2025–2026 | Noah | 26 | (3) |
| 2026– | Farense | 10 | (0) |

International career
| 2009–2010 | Bosnia and Herzegovina U17 | 7 | (0) |
| 2011–2012 | Bosnia and Herzegovina U19 | 7 | (0) |
| 2012–2014 | Bosnia and Herzegovina U21 | 6 | (2) |
| 2023 | Bosnia and Herzegovina | 1 | (0) |
- * Club domestic league appearances and goals as of 8 November 2026

Nermin Zolotić (pronounced [něrmin zǒlotitɕ]; born 7 July 1993) is a Bosnian professional footballer who plays as a centre-back for Liga Portugal 2 club Farense.

Zolotić started his professional career at Željezničar, before joining Gent in 2014, who loaned him to Istra 1961 in 2015 and back to Željezničar in 2016. Later that year, he moved to Roeselare. In 2020, Zolotić signed with Casa Pia. Five years later, he was transferred to Noah.

A former youth international for Bosnia and Herzegovina, Zolotić made his senior international debut in 2023, earning 1 cap.

== Club career ==
Zolotić came through the youth academy of his hometown club Željezničar. He made his professional debut against Travnik on 12 March 2011 at the age of 17. On 12 April 2014, he scored his first professional goal in a triumph over Olimpic.

In June, Zolotić was transferred to Belgian team Gent. In August 2015, he was sent on a season-long loan to Croatian side Istra 1961. In January 2016, he was loaned to his former team Željezničar until the end of season.

In July, he joined Roeselare.

In October 2020, Zolotić signed with Portuguese outfit Casa Pia.

In February 2025, he moved to Armenian club Noah.

In June 2026, he joined Farense.

== International career ==
Zolotić represented Bosnia and Herzegovina at all youth levels.

In November 2023, he received his first senior call up, for UEFA Euro 2024 qualifiers against Luxembourg and Slovakia. He debuted against the latter on 19 November.

== Career statistics ==
=== Club ===
As of match played 22 November 2026

Appearances and goals by club, season and competition
| Club | Season | League | | | National cup (Note: Includes Bosnian Cup, Croatian Cup, Belgian Cup, Taça de Portugal, Armenian Cup) | | League cup (Note: Includes Taça da Liga) | | Continental | | Other | | Total | |
| Club | Season | Division | Apps | Goals | Apps | Goals | Apps | Goals | Apps | Goals | Apps | Goals | Apps | Goals |
|---|---|---|---|---|---|---|---|---|---|---|---|---|---|---|
| Željezničar | 2010–11 | Bosnian Premier League | 3 | 0 | 1 | 0 | – | | – | | – | | 4 | 0 |
| Željezničar | 2011–12 | Bosnian Premier League | 11 | 0 | 3 | 0 | – | | 1 (Note: Appearance in UEFA Europa League) | 0 | – | | 15 | 0 |
| Željezničar | 2012–13 | Bosnian Premier League | 19 | 0 | 7 | 0 | – | | 2 (Note: Appearances in UEFA Champions League) | 0 | – | | 28 | 0 |
| Željezničar | 2013–14 | Bosnian Premier League | 13 | 1 | 2 | 0 | – | | 0 | 0 | – | | 15 | 1 |
| Željezničar | Total | | 46 | 1 | 13 | 0 | – | | 3 | 0 | – | | 62 | 1 |
| Gent | 2014–15 | Belgian Pro League | 4 | 0 | 0 | 0 | – | | – | | – | | 4 | 0 |
| Istra 1961 (loan) | 2015–16 | Croatian Football League | 13 | 0 | 1 | 0 | – | | – | | – | | 14 | 0 |
| Željezničar (loan) | 2015–16 | Bosnian Premier League | 7 | 0 | 3 | 0 | – | | – | | – | | 10 | 0 |
| Roeselare | 2016–17 | Challenger Pro League | 26 | 1 | 2 | 0 | – | | – | | 1 (Note: Appearance in Challenger Pro League promotion play-offs) | 0 | 29 | 1 |
| Roeselare | 2017–18 | Challenger Pro League | 24 | 2 | 2 | 0 | – | | – | | – | | 26 | 2 |
| Roeselare | 2018–19 | Challenger Pro League | 29 | 0 | 1 | 0 | – | | – | | – | | 30 | 0 |
| Roeselare | 2019–20 | Challenger Pro League | 21 | 0 | 1 | 0 | – | | – | | – | | 22 | 0 |
| Roeselare | Total | | 100 | 3 | 6 | 0 | – | | – | | 1 | 0 | 107 | 3 |
| Casa Pia | 2020–21 | Liga Portugal 2 | 22 | 1 | 1 | 0 | – | | – | | – | | 23 | 1 |
| Casa Pia | 2021–22 | Liga Portugal 2 | 31 | 0 | 3 | 1 | 2 | 0 | – | | – | | 36 | 1 |
| Casa Pia | 2022–23 | Primeira Liga | 29 | 0 | 4 | 0 | 3 | 0 | – | | – | | 36 | 0 |
| Casa Pia | 2023–24 | Primeira Liga | 31 | 1 | 2 | 0 | 4 | 0 | – | | – | | 37 | 1 |
| Casa Pia | 2024–25 | Primeira Liga | 7 | 0 | 1 | 0 | 0 | 0 | – | | – | | 8 | 0 |
| Casa Pia | Total | | 120 | 2 | 11 | 1 | 9 | 0 | – | | – | | 140 | 3 |
| Noah | 2024–25 | Armenian Premier League | 11 | 1 | 6 | 0 | – | | – | | – | | 17 | 1 |
| Noah | 2025–26 | Armenian Premier League | 15 | 2 | 4 | 0 | – | | 5 (Note: Two appearances in UEFA Champions League; three appearances in UEFA Conference League) | 0 | 0 | 0 | 24 | 2 |
| Noah | Total | | 26 | 3 | 10 | 0 | – | | 5 | 0 | 0 | 0 | 41 | 3 |
| Farense | 2026–27 | Liga Portugal 2 | 10 | 0 | 1 | 0 | – | | – | | – | | 11 | 0 |
| Career total | | | 326 | 9 | 45 | 1 | 9 | 0 | 8 | 0 | 1 | 0 | 389 | 10 |

=== International ===
Appearances and goals by national team and year
| National team | Year | Apps | Goals |
|---|---|---|---|
Bosnia and Herzegovina
| Bosnia and Herzegovina | 2023 | 1 | 0 |
| Total | | 1 | 0 |

== Honours ==
Željezničar

- Bosnian Premier League: 2011–12, 2012–13
- Bosnian Cup: 2010–11, 2011–12

Gent

- Belgian Pro League: 2014–15
- Belgian Super Cup: 2015

Noah

- Armenian Premier League: 2024–25
- Armenian Cup: 2024–25, 2025–26
- Armenian Supercup: 2025
