= Verin Bazmaberd =

Verin Bazmaberd Վերին Բազմաբերդ
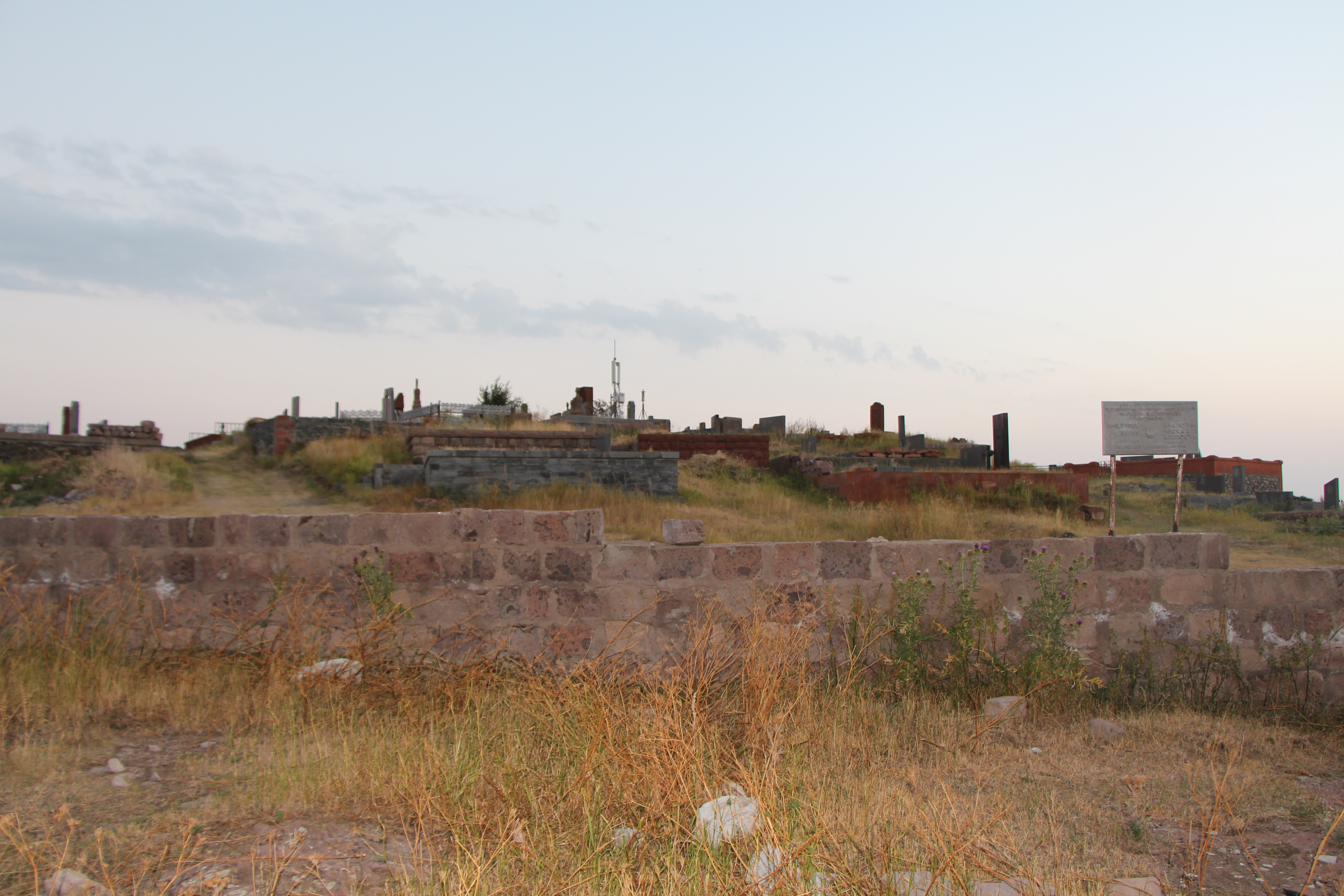

- Location within Armenia Location within Aragatsotn
- Coordinates: 40°22′N 44°01′E
- Country: Armenia
- Province: Aragatsotn
- Municipality: Talin
- Elevation: 1,600 m (5,200 ft)

Population (2011)
  - Total: 452
- Time zone: UTC+4
  - Summer (DST): UTC+5

Verin Bazmaberd (Armenian: Վերին Բազմաբերդ) is a village in the Talin Municipality of the Aragatsotn Province of Armenia.
