= David Sualehe =

Portuguese footballer (born 1997)

Personal information
- Full name: David de Senna Fernandes Sualehe
- Date of birth: 23 March 1997 (age 29)
- Place of birth: Porto, Portugal
- Height: 1.83 m (6 ft 0 in)
- Position: Left-back

Team information
- Current team: Noah
- Number: 33

Youth career
- 2007–2008: Odivelas
- 2008–2010: CAC
- 2010–2011: Sporting CP
- 2011: Belenenses
- 2012: CAC
- 2013: Boavista
- 2013–2016: Porto

Senior career*
Years	Team	Apps	(Gls)
2015	Porto B	0	(0)
2016–2018	Sporting CP B	39	(0)
2018–2020	Vitória Guimarães B	23	(0)
2019–2020	→ Farense (loan)	14	(0)
2020–2022	Paços de Ferreira	0	(0)
2021–2022	→ Académica (loan)	21	(0)
2022–2025	Olimpija Ljubljana	75	(2)
2025–	Noah	21	(0)

International career
2014	Portugal U18	2	(0)
2016	Portugal U19	2	(0)
- * Club domestic league appearances and goals as of 18 June 2026

David de Senna Fernandes Sualehe (born 23 March 1997) is a Portuguese professional footballer who plays as a left-back for Armenian Premier League club Noah.

== Career ==
Born in Porto and of Mozambican descent, Sualehe was on the books of several clubs as a youth, including Sporting CP and Belenenses in Lisbon, and FC Porto and Boavista in his hometown. He took part with Porto under-19 in the UEFA Youth League in 2015–16.

In July 2016, Sualehe ended his three-year spell at Porto by signing a five-year contract at Sporting with a release clause of €45 million. On 6 August, he made his professional debut with Sporting B in a 2016–17 LigaPro match against Portimonense, playing the first 73 minutes of a 2–1 home loss before being substituted for Bubacar Djaló.

On 30 August 2018, Sualehe signed a three-year deal at Vitória de Guimarães, being again assigned to the reserve team in the second tier. A year later, after relegation, he was loaned to Farense in the same league.

Sualehe moved to Primeira Liga club Paços de Ferreira on 1 September 2020, having contributed to Farense's promotion to the top flight. Nearly exactly a year later, having not played any games for the Castores, he was loaned to second-tier Académica de Coimbra.

On 12 July 2022, Sualehe left Portugal for the first time in his career, signing a two-year deal with the option of a third at Olimpija Ljubljana in the Slovenian PrvaLiga. He played 30 times in his first season, scoring once on 16 April 2023 to open a 2–0 home win over Maribor in the Eternal derby and win the title with five games remaining; the 20-metre strike was his first goal in 123 senior league appearances in his career. With a 2–1 extra time win over the same opponents in the cup final, the team secured a double.

== Honours ==
Olimpija Ljubljana

- Slovenian PrvaLiga: 2022–23, 2024–25
- Slovenian Football Cup: 2022–23

Noah

- Armenian Cup: 2025–26
- Armenian Supercup: 2025
