= Nardin Mulahusejnović =

Bosnian footballer (born 1998)

Personal information
- Date of birth: 9 February 1998 (age 28)
- Place of birth: Gračanica, Bosnia and Herzegovina
- Height: 1.90 m (6 ft 3 in)
- Position: Forward

Team information
- Current team: Vojvodina
- Number: 99

Youth career
- 2010–2014: Bratstvo Gračanica
- 2014–2015: Željezničar

Senior career*
Years	Team	Apps	(Gls)
2015–2017	Bratstvo Gračanica	23	(5)
2017–2018	Zrinjski Mostar	3	(0)
2018	→ GOŠK Gabela (loan)	14	(7)
2018–2020	Maribor	6	(1)
2020–2021	Koper	41	(15)
2021–2022	Mura	19	(3)
2022	Sarajevo	16	(3)
2023	Dynamo Makhachkala	12	(0)
2023	Koper	11	(3)
2024–2025	Zrinjski Mostar	42	(17)
2025–2026	Noah	25	(10)
2026–	Vojvodina	16	(6)

International career
2018–2020	Bosnia and Herzegovina U21	6	(0)
- * Club domestic league appearances and goals as of 22 November 2026

Nardin Mulahusejnović (Bosnian pronunciation: [nǎrdiːn mǔlaxuseːjnoʋitɕ]; born 9 February 1998) is a Bosnian professional footballer who plays as a forward for Serbian SuperLiga club Vojvodina.

== Club career ==
=== Early career ===
Mulahusejnović came through Bratstvo Gračanica's youth academy, and also spent some time in Željezničar's youth setup. He made his debut against Jedinstvo Bihać on 5 March 2016 at the age of 18. Over a year later, on 11 March 2017, he scored his first senior goal.

In June 2017, Mulahusejnović signed a multi-year contract with Zrinjski Mostar. In January 2018, he was sent on a six-month loan to GOŠK Gabela.

=== Maribor ===
On 29 June 2018, Mulahusejnović signed a four-year contract with Slovenian club Maribor. He won his first trophy with the club on 15 May 2019, when they were crowned league champions. A week later, he made his competitive debut for Maribor against Krško.

Mulahusejnović scored his first goal for the team against Triglav on 13 July 2019.

=== Dynamo Makhachkala ===
Mulahusejnović's contract with Russian club Dynamo Makhachkala was terminated by mutual consent on 8 June 2023.

=== Noah ===
On 31 July 2025, Mulahusejnović signed a three-year contract with Armenian club Noah.

=== Vojvodina ===
Bosnia and Herzegovina striker Nardin Mulahusejnović has officially left Armenian club Noah on June 2nd 2026 and signed a three-year contract with Vojvodina.

According to Serbian media reports, Noah will receive €600,000 for the transfer of their top scorer in the Conference League, as well as 10% of any future sale of the player.

== International career ==
Mulahusejnović was a member of the Bosnia and Herzegovina under-21 team under coach Vinko Marinović.

== Career statistics ==
As of 22 November 2026

Appearances and goals by club, season and competition
Club	Season	League			National cup (Note: Includes Bosnia and Herzegovina Cup, Slovenian Cup)		Continental		Other		Total	
Club	Season	Division	Apps	Goals	Apps	Goals	Apps	Goals	Apps	Goals	Apps	Goals
Bratstvo Gračanica	2015–16	First League of FBiH	2	0	—		—		—		2	0
Bratstvo Gračanica	2016–17	First League of FBiH	21	5	1	0	—		—		22	5
Bratstvo Gračanica	Total		23	5	1	0	0	0	—		24	5
Zrinjski Mostar	2017–18	Bosnian Premier League	3	0	0	0	2 (Note: Appearance(s) in UEFA Champions League)	0	—		5	0
GOŠK Gabela (loan)	2017–18	Bosnian Premier League	14	7	—		—		—		14	7
Maribor	2018–19	Slovenian PrvaLiga	1	0	0	0	0	0	—		1	0
Maribor	2019–20	Slovenian PrvaLiga	5	1	0	0	0	0	—		5	1
Maribor	Total		6	1	0	0	0	0	—		6	1
Koper	2020–21	Slovenian PrvaLiga	35	14	3	3	—		2 (Note: Appearance(s) in PrvaLiga play-off)	1	40	18
Koper	2021–22	Slovenian PrvaLiga	6	1	—		—		—		6	1
Koper	Total		41	15	3	3	—		2	1	46	19
Mura	2021–22	Slovenian PrvaLiga	19	3	1	0	5 (Note: Appearance(s) in UEFA Conference League)	0	—		25	3
Sarajevo	2022–23	Bosnian Premier League	16	3	1	0	—		—		17	3
Dynamo Makhachkala	2022–23	Russian First League	12	0	—		—		—		12	0
Koper	2023–24	Slovenian PrvaLiga	11	3	2	4	—		—		13	7
Zrinjski Mostar	2023–24	Bosnian Premier League	13	3	6	2	—		—		19	5
Zrinjski Mostar	2024–25	Bosnian Premier League	29	14	2	0	6	2	1 (Note: Appearance in Supercup of Bosnia and Herzegovina)	0	38	16
Zrinjski Mostar	Total		42	17	8	2	6	2	1	0	57	21
Noah	2025–26	Armenian Premier League	21	8	4	1	12 (Note: Two appearances in UEFA Europa League, ten appearances and five goals in UEFA Conference League)	5	1	0	38	14
Vojvodina	2026–27	Serbian SuperLiga	16	6	1	0	3 (Note: One appearance in UEFA Europa League, two appearances in UEFA Conference League)	0	—		20	6
Career total			224	68	21	10	28	7	4	1	277	86

== Honours ==
Maribor

- Slovenian PrvaLiga: 2018–19

Zrinjski Mostar

- Bosnian Cup: 2023–24

Noah

- Armenian Cup: 2025–26
- Armenian Supercup: 2025

Individual

- Slovenian PrvaLiga top scorer: 2020–21
