= Hakob Tonoyan Stadium =

Football stadium in Armavir, Armenia

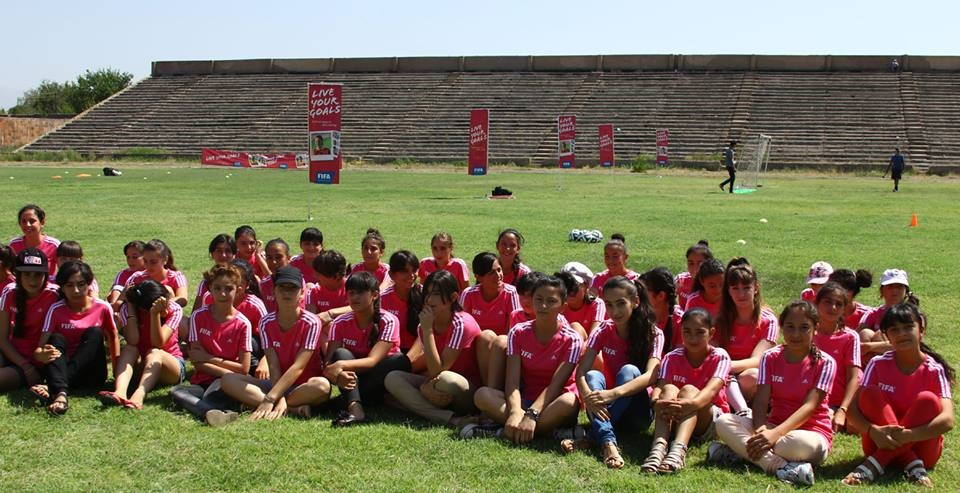
- The Stadium in July 2014, during the FIFA "Live Your Goals" program
- Interactive map of Hakob Tonoyan Stadium
- Location: Armavir, Armenia
- Coordinates: 40°09′52″N 44°2′44″E
- Owner: Football Federation of Armenia
- Capacity: 3,120
- Surface: Grass
- Field size: 105 x 68 meters

Construction
- Opened: 1980; 2021 (reopened)
- Renovated: 2017–21

Tenants
- Sardarapat FC (currently), FC Noah(2021-2023),Armavir (until 2003), 1985 FIFA World Youth Championship

Hakob Tonoyan Stadium (Armenian: Հակոբ Տոնոյանի անվան քաղաքային մարզադաշտ), formerly known as Jubilee Stadium or Yubileynyi Stadion (Armenian: Հոբելյանական մարզադաշտ), is a football stadium in Armavir, Armenia. The all-seater stadium has a capacity of 3,120.

== History ==
The stadium was originally opened in 1980 as the Jubilee Stadium (Yubileynyi Stadion in Russian), at the occasion of the 60th anniversary of the establishment of the Soviet rule in Armenia. At its inauguration, the stadium had two separate stands, one eastern and another western, with a capacity of around 10,000 spectators. It was home to FC Armavir until 2003 when the club was dissolved and retired from professional football.

In 1985, the stadium hosted a single match in the group stage of the FIFA World Youth Championship hosted by the Soviet Union.

=== Redevelopment ===
On 4 February 2016, the ownership of the stadium was transferred to the Football Federation of Armenia by the decision of the government. It is envisaged to upgrade the stadium with an investment of around US$1.65 million.

In mid-2017, the stadium was closed in order to undergo a large-scale reconstruction process. However, after several delays, the process was finally launched by the Football Federation of Armenia and completed in November 2021. The eastern stand of the stadium was entirely removed and replaced with an artificial-turf training pitch. The main stand was fully reconstructed and turned into an all-seater tribune with a capacity of 3,120 seats. The stadium which is surrounded by 3 regular-sized training fields was officially reopened on 30 November 2021.
