= Timothy Fayulu =

Congolese footballer (born 1999)

Personal information
- Full name: Timothy Bruce Fayulu
- Date of birth: 24 July 1999 (age 27)
- Place of birth: Geneva, Switzerland
- Height: 1.92 m (6 ft 4 in)
- Position: Goalkeeper

Team information
- Current team: Sion

Youth career
- 2007–2008: CS Italien
- 2008–2011: Servette
- 2011–2016: Étoile Carouge
- 2016–2017: Olymp. Genève

Senior career*
Years	Team	Apps	(Gls)
2017–2018	Olymp. Genève	11	(0)
2018–	Sion	97	(0)
2018–2021	Sion II	25	(0)
2019	→ Olymp. Genève (loan)		
2022–2023	→ Winterthur (loan)	11	(0)
2025–2026	→ Noah (loan)	4	(0)

International career^{‡}
2015	DR Congo U18	1	(0)
2025–	DR Congo	2	(0)
- * Club domestic league appearances and goals as of 27 May 2026 ‡ National team caps and goals as of 13:29, 18 June 2025 (UTC)

Timothy Bruce Fayulu (born 24 July 1999) is a professional footballer who plays as a goalkeeper for Swiss Super League club Sion. Born in Switzerland, he plays for the DR Congo national team.

== Club career ==
Fayulu began his footballing career as a forward with CS Italien when he was 7 years old. Switching to goalkeeper after a growth spurt, he spent his early career with various youth clubs in Switzerland before moving to Sion in 2018. Fayulu made his professional debut for the Swiss club in a 3–0 Swiss Super League win over Grasshopper on 22 May 2019.

Often used as a second-choice goalkeeper in the earliest stages of his career, the first choice being Kevin Fickentscher, during the 2020–21 season he started featuring for Sion more regularly, in alternative to the same team-mate. He started the 2021–22 season as the starter at Sion, before soon losing the starting spot to Fickentscher once again.

On 24 June 2022, Fayulu moved on a season-long loan to Winterthur.

== International career ==
Born in Switzerland, Fayulu is of Congolese descent. He represented the DR Congo U18 side in a friendly 8–0 loss to the England U17 in October 2015.

In March 2021, he received his first call-up both from the Congolese senior national team (for two Africa Cup of Nations qualification matches) and the Swiss under-21 national team: he chose the latter side, thus being selected in the squad that would take part in the UEFA European Under-21 Championship in Hungary and Slovenia. He debuted with the senior DR Congo national team in a friendly 3–1 win over Madagascar on 8 June 2025.

On 16 November 2025, in the final of the second round of 2026 FIFA World Cup qualification, DR Congo had tied Nigeria 1–1, taking the game to penalties. Fayulu, who had been substituted on in the 89th minute, saved a penalty from Semi Ajayi which, after a successful penalty from Chancel Mbemba, secured DR Congo's qualification for the inter-confederation play-offs. After the match, in an interview with FIFA, he stated "It would be my ultimate dream to be able to wear my country's shirt at the World Cup."

On May 19, 2026, he was included in the 26-man squad selected by head coach Sébastien Desabre to represent the DR Congo at the 2026 FIFA World Cup.
