= 2025–26 Armenian Cup =

Tournament details
- Country: Armenia
- Teams: 19

Final positions
- Champions: Noah
- Runners-up: Urartu

Tournament statistics
- Matches played: 24
- Goals scored: 67 (2.79 per match)
- All statistics correct as of 14 May 2026.

The 2025–26 Armenian Cup is the 35th edition of the football competition in Armenia. The winners will qualify for the 2026–27 UEFA Conference League second qualifying round.

== Teams ==
Round	Clubs remaining	Clubs involved	Winners from previous round	New entries this round	Leagues entering at this round
Preliminary round	20	12	None	12	2 Amateur A-League teams 8 Armenian First League teams 2 Armenian Premier League teams
Round of 16	14	12	6	6	6 Armenian Premier League teams
Quarter-finals	8	8	6	2	2 Armenian Premier League teams (Noah as champions of the 2024-25 Armenian Premier League and the 2024-25 Armenian Cup, Ararat-Armenia as runner-up of the 2024-25 Armenian Premier League and the 2024-25 Armenian Cup)
Semi-finals	4	4	4	none	none
Final	2	2	2	none	none

== Preliminary round ==
On 15 July 2025, the Football Federation of Armenia announced the draw for the preliminary round.

16 September 2025	Araks Ararat (2)	1–1 (a.e.t.) (7–6 p)	Lernayin Artsakh (2)	Charentsavan
16:00 (UTC+4)	Zakaryan 54'; Nazaretyan (yellow card) 65'; Uzunyan (yellow card) 94'; Shirkhanyan (yellow card) 120'	Report	S.Hovhannisyan (red card) 44'; Hovsepyan 62'; Petrosyan (yellow card) 81'; Augustine (yellow card) 110'	Stadium: City Stadium; Referee: Tiran Eritsyan
	Penalties
	Pirijanyan (penalty scored); Uzunyan (penalty scored); Shirkhanyan (penalty missed); Hakobyan (penalty scored); Mkrtchyan (penalty scored); Baroyan (penalty scored); Ahmed (penalty missed); Si Savan (penalty scored); Lyansberg (penalty scored)		(penalty scored) Hakobyan; (penalty scored) Petrosyan; (penalty scored) Demba Die; (penalty scored) Hovsepyan; (penalty scored) Augustine; (penalty missed) Ghulinyan; (penalty missed) N.Hovhannisyan; (penalty scored) Geghamyan; (penalty missed) Chatunts

16 September 2025	Syunik (2)	3–1	Hayk (2)	Kapan
16:00 (UTC+4)	Yesayan (yellow card) 16'; Amijekori 32'; Simonyan (yellow card) 52'; Karapetyan 74' (pen.); A.Hovhannisyan 90+2'; Mkrtchyan (yellow card) 90+5'; Poghikyan (yellow card) 90+7'	Report	Azizyan 30' (pen.); Arabyan (yellow card) 64'; Bilunga (yellow card) 79'; Arzoyan (yellow card) 84'; Williams (yellow card) 90'	Stadium: Kaoan Stadium; Referee: Artak Vardanyan

17 September 2025	Mika (2)	1–2	Sardarapat (2)	Yerevan
16:00 (UTC+4)	Sahakyan (yellow card) 70'; Navoyan (yellow card) 80'; Hovhannesyan 90+1' (pen.)	Report	Mkrtchyan 35', 64'; Kirakosyan (yellow card) 38'; Davtyan (yellow card) 90+2'; Beglaryan (yellow card) 90+3'	Stadium: Mika Stadium; Referee: Vardan Vardumyan

17 September 2025	Gandzasar Kapan (1)	2–1	Alashkert (1)	Yerevan
17:00 (UTC+4)	Karagulyan (yellow card) 11'; Mani 27'; Hayrapetyan (yellow card) 29'; Ismail (yellow card) 65'; Alaverdyan 84' (yellow card) 85'; Matevosyan (yellow card) 88'; Emmanuel (yellow card) 90'; Avetisyan (yellow card) 90+5'	Report	Nduka (yellow card) 48'; Campos 54' (yellow card) 54'	Stadium: Junior Sport Stadium; Referee: Sargis Khachatryan

18 September 2025	Bentonit (2)	0–3	Andranik (2)	Vanadzor
16:00 (UTC+4)		Report	Olawale 14'; Petrosyan 19'; Palacios 63'; Poghosyan (yellow card) 88'	Stadium: City Stadium; Referee: Davit Mkrtchyan

2025	Vayk (3)	Walkover	Kilikia (3)
(UTC+4)		Report
Note: Vayk refused to participate in the cup, therefor the match was awarded to Kilikia.

== Round of 16 ==
On 22 September 2025, the Football Federation of Armenia announced the draw for the Round of 16 matches.

28 October 2025	Araks Ararat (2)	0–4	Shirak (1)	Charentsavan
14:00 (UTC+4)	Pirijanyan (yellow card) 26'	Report	Misakyan 35'; Mkrtchyan 70'; Tovmasyan 76'; Ghumashyan 77'; L.Darbinyan (yellow card) 90+2'	Stadium: City Stadium; Referee: Zaven Hovhannisyan

28 October 2025	Urartu (1)	4–0	Van (1)	Yerevan
19:00 (UTC+4)	Mkrtchyan (yellow card) 11'; Vardanyan 45+1'; Polyakov 52'; Agasaryan (yellow card) 54'; Santos (yellow card) 72'; Melkonyan 81', 88'	Report	Mkoyan (yellow card) 43'	Stadium: Urartu Stadium; Referee: Henrik Nalbandian

29 October 2025	Andranik (2)	2–0	BKMA Yerevan (1)	Yerevan
15:00 (UTC+4)	Morozumi 9' (yellow card) 73'; Jamalyan (yellow card) 28'; Palacios 41'; Gamboa (yellow card) 49'; Ganizhonov (yellow card) 70'; Olawale (yellow card) 80'; Oublal (yellow card) 90+1'; Al.Poghosyan (yellow card) 90+6'	Report	Kirakosyan (yellow card) 11'; Ars.Petrosyan (red card) 64'; N.Hovhannisyan (yellow card) 74'; Avetisyan (yellow card) 84'; Bashoyan (yellow card) 87'	Stadium: Junior Sport Stadium; Referee: Ashot Ghaltakhchyan

29 October 2025	Pyunik (1)	3–0	Gandzasar Kapan (1)	Abovyan
19:00 (UTC+4)	Hovhannisyan (yellow card) 28'; Noubissi 52'; Kulikov 61'; Kovalenko 82'	Report	Duffour (yellow card) 3'	Stadium: Vahagn Tumasyan Stadium; Referee: Artem Gasparyan

30 October 2025	Sardarapat (2)	0–3	Ararat Yerevan (1)	Armavir
15:00 (UTC+4)	Budaghyan (yellow card) 30'	Report	Ouattara 63'; Doumbia 67'; Lulukyan 81'	Stadium: Hakob Tonoyan Stadium; Referee: Tiran Yeritsyan

30 October 2025	Syunik (2)	1–0	Kilikia (3)	Kapan
19:00 (UTC+4)	Soghomonyan 51'; A.Hovhannisyan (yellow card) 58'; Yesayan (yellow card) 82'	Report		Stadium: Kapan Stadium; Referee: Sargis Khachatryan

== Quarter-finals ==
On 20 November 2025, the Football Federation of Armenia announced the draw for the Quarter-finals.

5 March 2026	Pyunik (1)	1–2	Noah (1)	Yerevan
15:00 (UTC+4)	Vakulenko (yellow card) 49'; Moreno 58' (pen.); Ocansey (red card) 90+5'	Report	Costache 49'; Hambardzumyan 67'	Stadium: Junior Sport Stadium; Referee: Henrik Nalbandian

1 April 2026	Noah (1)	2–2 (4–3 agg.)	Pyunik (1)	Abovyan
16:00 (UTC+4)	Khamoyan 31' (yellow card) 80'; Sualehe (yellow card) 45+6'; Eteki (yellow card) 58'; Saintini (yellow card) 68'; Jakoliš 86'	Report	Miljković 37'; Hovhannisyan (yellow card) 45+1' (goal) 45+6'; Kovalenko (yellow card) 45+6'; Islamović (yellow card) 53'; Tarakhchyan (yellow card) 90+3'	Stadium: Vahagn Tumasyan Stadium; Referee: Ashot Harutyunyan

3 March 2026	Syunik (2)	0–0	Andranik (2)	Kapan
15:00 (UTC+4)	Moreno (yellow card) 75'; Simonyan (yellow card) 85'	Report	Morozumi (yellow card) 43'; Oublal (yellow card) 60'; Camille (yellow card) 72'; Zakaryan (yellow card) 75'; Palacios (yellow card) 85'	Stadium: Kapan Stadium; Referee: Zaven Hovhannisyan

2 April 2026	Andranik (2)	5–2 (5–2 agg.)	Syunik (2)	Yerevan
16:00 (UTC+4)	Ndidi 29' (yellow card) 33'; Petrosyan 41'; Hakobyan 61'; Sesay (yellow card) 70'; Aleksanyan (yellow card) 70'; Obi (yellow card) 87'; Zakaryan (yellow card) 89'; Ye 90+4', 90+7'	Report	Afajanyan 20'; Soghomonyan (yellow card) 30'; Hovhannisyan 67'; Arakelyan (red card) 69'; Karapetyan (yellow card) 70'; Gevorgyan (yellow card) 71'; Vardanyan (yellow card) 71'	Stadium: Junior Sport Stadium

4 March 2026	Ararat-Armenia (1)	1–0	Shirak (1)	Yerevan
15:00 (UTC+4)	Tera (yellow card) 26'; Ndour 45+1'; Arrassi (yellow card) 80'; Hovhannisyan (yellow card) 82'; Eloyan (yellow card) 89'	Report	Mnatsakanyan (yellow card) 9'	Stadium: Junior Sport Stadium; Referee: Hovhannes Kalantaryan

2 April 2026	Shirak (1)	0–2 (0–3 agg.)	Ararat-Armenia (1)	Gyumri
19:00 (UTC+4)	Pahlevanyan (yellow card) 8'; Kodia (yellow card) 31'; Misakyan (yellow card) 55'; Janoyan (yellow card) 66'	Report	Muradyan (yellow card) 60'; Ayongo 61'; Ndour (yellow card) 63'; Welton 77'	Stadium: City Stadium; Referee: Vardan Manukyan

3 March 2026	Ararat Yerevan (1)	0–3	Urartu (1)	Yerevan
17:00 (UTC+4)	Samsonyan (yellow card) 25'; Kartashyan (yellow card) 56'	Report	Margaryan (yellow card) 44'; Piloyan (yellow card) 46'; Michel (yellow card) 56'; Gunko 81'; Melkonyan 90+1' (pen.); Santos 90+7'	Stadium: Republican Stadium; Referee: Artem Gasparyan

1 April 2026	Urartu (1)	2–3 (5–3 agg.)	Ararat Yerevan (1)	Yerevan
19:00 (UTC+4)	Llovet 27'; Kaloukian 43'	Report	Lima 25'; Ouattara (yellow card) 55'; Kante 88'; Touré 90+5'	Stadium: Urartu Stadium; Referee: David Mkrtchyan

== Semi-finals ==
On 3 April 2026, the Football Federation of Armenia announced the draw for the Semi-finals.

15 April 2026	Andranik (2)	1–1	Urartu (1)	Yerevan
18:00 (UTC+4)	Ndidi 89'	Report	Polyarus 12' (pen.)	Stadium: Junior Sport Stadium; Referee: Zaven Hovhannisyan

29 April 2026	Urartu (1)	1–0 (2–1 agg.)	Andranik (2)	Yerevan
16:00 (UTC+4)	Michel 33' (pen.); Llovet (yellow card) 72'	Report	Palacios (yellow card) 25'; Obi (yellow card) 44'; Traore (yellow card) 70'	Stadium: Urartu Stadium; Referee: Sargis Khachatryan

16 April 2026	Ararat-Armenia (1)	0–1	Noah (1)	Abovyan
18:30 (UTC+4)	Hovhannisyan (red card) 73'; Malis (yellow card) 73'; Queirós (yellow card) 90'	Report	Mulahusejnović 25' (yellow card) 51'; Saintini (red card) 73'; Sangaré (yellow card) 73'; Oshima (yellow card) 88'; Coneglian (yellow card) 90+5'; Hambardzumyan (yellow card) 90+10'	Stadium: Vahagn Tumasyan Stadium; Referee: Vardan Manukyan

29 April 2026	Noah (1)	0–0 (1–0 agg.)	Ararat-Armenia (1)	Abovyan
18:30 (UTC+4)	Zolotić (yellow card) 51'; Coneglian (yellow card) 80'; Khamoyan (yellow card) 84'	Report	Bueno (yellow card) 45'	Stadium: Vahagn Tumasyan Stadium; Referee: Zaven Yohannya

== Final ==
14 May 2026	Urartu (1)	2–4	Noah (1)	Yerevan
19:00 (UTC+4)	Mirzoyan 10'; Santos (yellow card) 45'; Vardanyan 75'	Report	Ferreira 26'; Jakoliš 45+1', 52'; Saintini 57'	Stadium: Republican Stadium; Referee: Zaven Hovhannisyan

== Goal scorers ==
As of match played 13 May 2026

3 goals:

- (Croatia) Marin Jakoliš - Noah
- (Armenia) Karen Melkonyan - Urartu

2 goals:

- (Armenia) Erik Petrosyan - Andranik
- (Burkina Faso) Honoré Yé - Andranik
- (Colombia) Juan Palacios - Andranik
- (Nigeria) Michael Ndidi - Andranik
- (Armenia) Vrezh Mkrtchyan - Sardarapat
- (Armenia) Armen Hovhannisyan - Syunik
- (Armenia) Edik Vardanyan - Urartu

1 goals:

- (Venezuela) Juan Campos - Alashkert
- (Armenia) Vache Hakobyan - Andranik
- (Japan) Kai Morozumi - Andranik
- (Nigeria) Ismail Ogunsola Olawale - Andranik
- (Armenia) Vladimir Zakaryan - Araks Ararat
- (Brazil) Welton - Ararat-Armenia
- (Ghana) Paul Ayongo - Ararat-Armenia
- (Senegal) Alioune Ndour - Ararat-Armenia
- (Armenia) Gor Lulukyan - Ararat Yerevan
- (Ivory Coast) Moussa Kante - Ararat Yerevan
- (Ivory Coast) Aboubacar Ouattara - Ararat Yerevan
- (Mali) Kalifala Mamadou Doumbia - Ararat Yerevan
- (Mali) Souleymane Touré - Ararat Yerevan
- (Senegal) Guy Felix Lima - Ararat Yerevan
- (Cameroon) Bertrand Mani - Gandzasar Kapan
- (Armenia) Narek Alaverdyan - Gandzasar Kapan
- (Armenia) Erik Azizyan - Hayk
- (Armenia) Rumyan Hovsepyan - Lernayin Artsakh
- (Armenia) Alik Hovhannesyan - Mika
- (Armenia) Karlen Hovhannisyan - Pyunik
- (Cameroon) Marius Noubissi - Pyunik
- (Russia) Mikhail Kovalenko - Pyunik
- (Russia) Daniil Kulikov - Pyunik
- (Serbia) Aleksandar Miljković - Pyunik
- (Spain) Javi Moreno - Pyunik
- (Armenia) Hovhannes Hambardzumyan - Noah
- (Armenia) Aram Khamoyan - Noah
- (Bosnia and Herzegovina) Nardin Mulahusejnović - Noah
- (Guadeloupe) Nathanaël Saintini - Noah
- (Portugal) Hélder Ferreira - Noah
- (Romania) Valentin Costache - Noah
- (Armenia) Grigor Ghumashyan - Shirak
- (Armenia) Rafik Misakyan - Shirak
- (Armenia) Rudik Mkrtchyan - Shirak
- (Armenia) Vardan Tovmasyan - Shirak
- (Armenia) Petros Afajanyan - Syunik
- (Armenia) Alen Karapetyan - Syunik
- (Armenia) Erik Soghomonyan - Syunik
- (France) Joachim Amijekori - Syunik
- (Armenia) Nicholas Kaloukian - Urartu
- (Armenia) Mikayel Mirzoyan - Urartu
- (Brazil) Alef Santos - Urartu
- (France) Alexandre Llovet - Urartu
- (Russia) Artemi Gunko - Urartu
- (Russia) Oleg Polyakov - Urartu
- (Russia) Artem Polyarus - Urartu
- (Brazil) Bruno Michel - Urartu

== See also ==
- Football in Armenia
- 2025–26 Armenian Premier League
- 2025–26 Armenian First League
