= Nathanaël Saintini =

Guadeloupean footballer (born 2000)

Personal information
- Full name: Nathanaël Ruben Saintini
- Date of birth: 30 May 2000 (age 26)
- Place of birth: Les Abymes, Guadeloupe
- Height: 1.88 m (6 ft 2 in)
- Position: Centre-back

Team information
- Current team: Noah
- Number: 39

Youth career
- 2007–2015: MJC des Abymes
- 2015: CASC Ouillins-Lyon
- 2015–2016: Saint-Priest
- 2016–2017: Montpellier

Senior career*
Years	Team	Apps	(Gls)
2017–2018	Montpellier II	4	(0)
2018–2019	Cholet	14	(0)
2019–2025	Sion II	33	(2)
2019–2025	Sion	47	(0)
2020–2021	→ Titus Pétange (loan)	18	(0)
2024	→ Kryvbas Kryvyi Rih (loan)	8	(0)
2024–2025	→ Martigues (loan)	28	(0)
2025–	Noah	21	(2)

International career^{‡}
2018	France U18	2	(0)
2022–	Guadeloupe	21	(0)
- * Club domestic league appearances and goals as of 18 June 2026 ‡ National team caps and goals as of 21:56, 8 July 2025 (UTC)

Nathanaël Ruben Saintini (born 30 May 2000) is a Guadeloupean professional footballer who plays as a centre-back for Armenian Premier League club Noah and the Guadeloupe national team.

== Club career ==
Saintini is a youth product of the Guadeloupean club MJC des Abymes, and continued his development in mainland France with the youth academies of CASC Ouillins-Lyon, Saint-Priest and Montpellier. He began his senior career with Montpellier reserves, before moving to SO Cholet in the Championnat National. He transferred to FC Sion on 8 January 2019.

Saintini spent the 2020–21 season on loan with the Luxembourgian club Union Titus Pétange. He made his professional debut with Sion in a 1–0 Swiss Super League win over BSC Young Boys on 7 August 2021.

On 14 February 2024, Saintini joined Kryvbas Kryvyi Rih in Ukraine on loan with an option to buy.

On 3 September 2025, Noah signed a permanent contract with Saintini.

== International career ==
Born in the French overseas department of Guadeloupe, Saintini represented the France U18s twice in 2018. He debuted for the Guadeloupe national team in a friendly 2–0 loss to Cape Verde on 23 March 2022.

== Honours ==
Noah

- Armenian Cup: 2025–26
- Armenian Supercup: 2025
