= Marin Jakoliš =

Croatian footballer (born 1996)

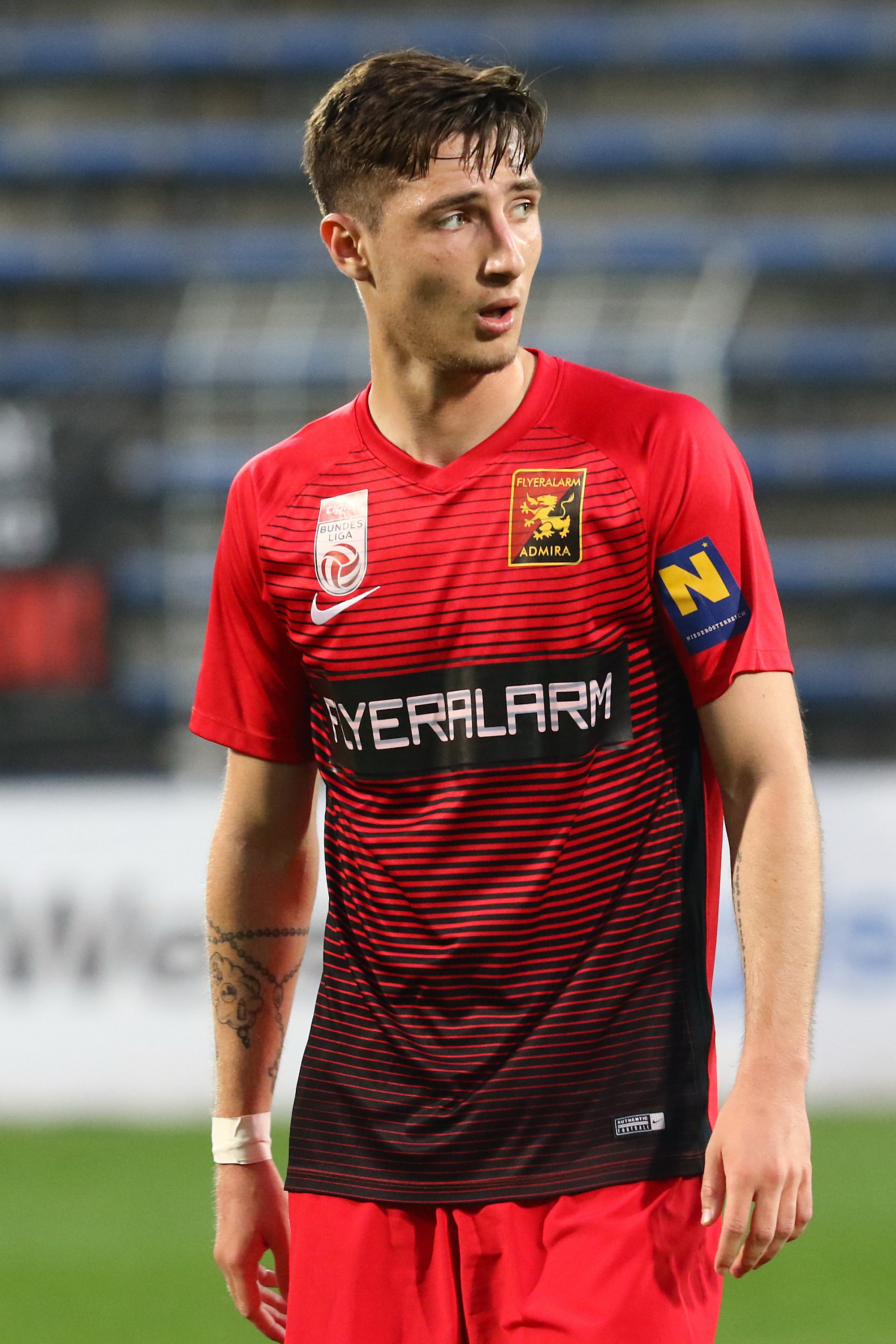
- Jakoliš with Admira Wacker in 2018

Personal information
- Date of birth: 26 December 1996 (age 29)
- Place of birth: Šibenik, Croatia
- Height: 1.82 m (6 ft 0 in)
- Positions: Winger; forward

Team information
- Current team: FC Noah
- Number: 47

Youth career
- 2011–2013: Šibenik

Senior career*
Years	Team	Apps	(Gls)
2013	Šibenik	9	(0)
2013–2016	Mouscron	13	(0)
2016	→ Virton (loan)	9	(1)
2016–2017	Roeselare	18	(2)
2017–2019	Admira Wacker	51	(6)
2019–2022	Hajduk Split	44	(2)
2021–2022	→ Šibenik (loan)	19	(10)
2022–2024	Angers	11	(0)
2022	Angers B	4	(1)
2023	→ AEK Larnaca (loan)	13	(0)
2023–2024	→ Melbourne City (loan)	24	(2)
2024–2025	Macarthur FC	26	(10)
2025–	FC Noah	23	(4)

International career^{‡}
2010–2011	Croatia U15	6	(0)
2014	Croatia U18	2	(0)
2017–2019	Croatia U21	15	(5)
- * Club domestic league appearances and goals as of 18 June 2026 ‡ National team caps and goals as of 29 June 2020

Marin Jakoliš (born 26 December 1996) is a Croatian-Australian professional footballer who plays as a winger or forward for FC Noah.

== Club career ==
On 29 January 2022, Jakoliš signed a 3.5-year contract with French club Angers. On 20 January 2023, he was loaned out to Cypriot First Division club AEK Larnaca until the end of the season.

== Personal life ==
His brother Antonio is also a footballer. He wears the jersey number 44 as a nod to Dražen Petrović, a legendary Croatian basketball player who was coached by Jakoliš's father.

Jakoliš' father is an Australian citizen, who had lived in Melbourne for 15 years. However, despite Jakoliš having an Australian passport, he is not currently eligible to play for Australia due to FIFA rules regarding his continuous Australian residency.

== Honours ==
Macarthur

- Australia Cup: 2024

Noah

- Armenian Cup: 2025–26
- Armenian Supercup: 2025
