= Takuto Oshima =

Japanese footballer

Personal information
- Full name: Takuto Oshima
- Date of birth: 1 June 1998 (age 28)
- Place of birth: Hirakata, Japan
- Height: 1.75 m (5 ft 9 in)
- Position: Midfielder

Team information
- Current team: Noah
- Number: 14

Youth career
- 2014–2016: Rissho Univ. Shonan High School

College career
Years	Team	Apps	(Gls)
2017–2019	Fukuoka University		

Senior career*
Years	Team	Apps	(Gls)
2019	FC Osaka		
2019–2020	FC Awaji-shima		
2020–2021	Družstevník Župčany	10	(4)
2021	→ Zemplín Michalovce (loan)	13	(2)
2021–2022	Zemplín Michalovce	31	(2)
2022–2024	Cracovia	60	(1)
2024–2025	Universitatea Craiova	34	(1)
2025–	Noah	22	(2)
- * Club domestic league appearances and goals as of 18 June 2026

Takuto Oshima (Japanese: 大島 拓登, Oshima Takuto; born 1 June 1998) is a Japanese professional footballer who plays as a midfielder for Armenian Premier League club Noah.

== Club career ==
=== MFK Zemplín Michalovce ===
He made his Fortuna Liga debut for Zemplín Michalovce on 14 February 2021 against Pohronie.

=== Cracovia ===
On 12 July 2022, Oshima was announced as Cracovia's new signing, joining the club on a two-year deal.

== Honours ==
Noah

- Armenian Cup: 2025–26
- Armenian Supercup: 2025
