= Yan Eteki =

Cameroonian footballer

Personal information
- Full name: Yan Brice Eteki
- Date of birth: 26 August 1997 (age 29)
- Place of birth: Yaoundé, Cameroon
- Height: 1.80 m (5 ft 11 in)
- Position: Midfielder

Team information
- Current team: Noah
- Number: 88

Youth career
- 2011–2012: Leganés
- 2012–2016: Sevilla

Senior career*
Years	Team	Apps	(Gls)
2015–2018	Sevilla B	70	(1)
2018–2019	Almería	31	(0)
2019	Sevilla	0	(0)
2019–2022	Granada	65	(0)
2022–2023	Casa Pia	17	(0)
2023	→ Cartagena (loan)	10	(0)
2023–2024	Alcorcón	32	(1)
2024–	Noah	36	(0)

International career^{‡}
2019	Cameroon U23	3	(0)
2020–	Cameroon	2	(0)
- * Club domestic league appearances and goals as of 18 June 2026 ‡ National team caps and goals as of 9 August 2023

Yan Brice Eteki (born 26 August 1997) is a Cameroonian professional footballer who plays for as a central midfielder for Armenian club Noah.

== Club career ==
Born in Yaoundé, Eteki signed for Sevilla FC's youth setup in December 2012, from CD Leganés. He made his senior debut for the reserves on 22 February 2015, coming on as a late substitute in a 2–0 Segunda División B home win against FC Cartagena.

On 11 December 2015, Eteki renewed his contract until 2018. He made his professional debut on 21 August of the following year, starting in a 3–3 Segunda División home draw against Girona FC.

After being a regular starter during the first half of the campaign, Eteki extended his deal until 2019 on 20 January 2017. He scored his first professional goal on 16 April, netting the first in a 6–2 home routing of Real Valladolid.

On 23 August 2018, after suffering relegation, Eteki signed a two-year deal with fellow second division side UD Almería. He became a regular starter in Fran Fernández's side, contributing with 31 appearances during the campaign.

On 17 July 2019, Eteki returned to Sevilla after the club activated his €500,000 buy-back clause. The following day, he agreed to a three-year deal with Granada CF, newly promoted to La Liga.

On 19 July 2022, after Granada's relegation, Eteki signed for Primeira Liga newcomers Casa Pia AC. The following 29 January, he returned to Spain and its second division, joining FC Cartagena on loan until the end of the season, with the option to purchase should they get promoted.

On 8 August 2023, Eteki signed for AD Alcorcón, newly-promoted to the second division.

== International career ==
Eteki made his debut with the Cameroon national team in a friendly 0-0 tie with Japan on 9 October 2020.

== Career statistics ==
=== Club ===
As of match played 20 May 2023

Appearances and goals by club, season and competition
Club	Season	League			National cup (Note: Includes Copa del Rey and Taça de Portugal)		League cup (Note: Includes Taça da Liga)		Continental		Total	
Club	Season	Division	Apps	Goals	Apps	Goals	Apps	Goals	Apps	Goals	Apps	Goals
Sevilla B	2014–15	Segunda División B	1	0	—		—		—		1	0
Sevilla B	2015–16	Segunda División B	1	0	—		—		—		1	0
Sevilla B	2016–17	Segunda División	38	1	—		—		—		38	1
Sevilla B	2017–18	Segunda División	30	0	—		—		—		30	0
Sevilla B	Total		70	1	0	0	0	0	0	0	70	1
Almería	2018–19	Segunda División	31	0	2	0	—		—		33	0
Granada	2019–20	La Liga	28	0	7	0	—		—		35	0
Granada	2020–21	La Liga	25	0	5	0	—		10 (Note: Appearance(s) in UEFA Europa League)	0	40	0
Granada	2021–22	La Liga	12	0	2	0	—		—		14	0
Granada	Total		65	0	14	0	0	0	10	0	89	0
Casa Pia	2022–23	Primeira Liga	17	0	3	1	3	0	—		23	1
Cartagena (loan)	2022–23	Segunda División	10	0	0	0	—		—		10	0
Career total			193	1	19	1	3	0	10	0	225	2

=== International ===
As of match played 30 March 2021

Appearances and goals by national team and year
National team	Year	Apps	Goals
Cameroon	2020	1	0
Cameroon	2021	1	0
Total		2	0

== Honours ==
Noah

- Armenian Cup: 2025–26
- Armenian Supercup: 2025
