= Rob Nizet =

Belgian footballer (born 2002)

Personal information
- Date of birth: 14 April 2002 (age 24)
- Place of birth: Banjul, The Gambia
- Height: 1.77 m (5 ft 10 in)
- Position: Defender

Team information
- Current team: Iraklis
- Number: 18

Youth career
- –2019: RSCA Futures
- 2019–2021: Norwich City
- 2021–2023: Lecce

Senior career*
Years	Team	Apps	(Gls)
2023–2024	Lommel	16	(0)
2024–2025	Willem II	34	(2)
2025–2026	Gaziantep	2	(0)
2026	Noah	9	(0)
2026–	Iraklis	6	(1)

International career^{‡}
2017	Belgium U15	3	(0)
2017–2018	Belgium U16	12	(1)
2018–2019	Belgium U17	14	(0)
2019	Belgium U18	14	(0)
2019	Belgium U19	12	(0)
2024	Belgium U21	1	(0)
- * Club domestic league appearances and goals as of 13 October 2026 ‡ National team caps and goals as of 4 June 2024

Rob Nizet (born 14 April 2002) is a professional footballer who plays as a defender for Super League Greece club Iraklis. Born in The Gambia, he is a Belgium youth international.

== Club career ==
Born in The Gambia, Nizet was in the youth academy at RSCA Futures prior to joining Norwich City during the 2019–20 season. He joined Italian side Lecce in August 2021.

He joined Lommel S.K. in Belgium in January 2023. He joined Willem II in January 2024, agreeing to an eighteen-month contract. He scored his first goal for the club in a 4–1 Eerste Divisie win over Jong AZ in April 2024. The following month, he gained promotion to the Eredivisie with Willem II.

On 1 March 2026, Armenian Premier League club Noah announced the signing of Nizet from Gaziantep. On 11 June 2026, after featuring nine times for the club, Noah announced that Nizet had left the club.

== International career ==
Nizet made his debut for the Belgium under-17 national team in September 2018.

== Career statistics ==
As of 5 July 2026

Club	Season	League			Cup		Continental		Other		Total	
Club	Season	Division	Apps	Goals	Apps	Goals	Apps	Goals	Apps	Goals	Apps	Goals
Lommel	2022–23	Challenger Pro League	8	0	0	0	—		—		8	0
Lommel	2023–24	Challenger Pro League	8	0	1	0	—		—		9	0
Lommel	Total		16	0	1	0	—		—		17	0
Willem II	2023–24	Eerste Divisie	13	2	0	0	—		—		13	2
Willem II	2024–25	Eredivisie	24	1	1	0	—		—		25	1
Willem II	Total		37	3	1	0	—		—		38	3
Gaziantep	2025–26	Süper Lig	2	0	2	0	—		—		4	0
Noah	2025–26	Armenian Premier League	9	0	0	0	—		—		9	0
Career total			54	3	4	0	0	0	0	0	58	3
