= List of Armenian football transfers summer 2026 =

This is a list of Armenian football transfers in the summer transfer window, by club. Only clubs of the 2026–27 Armenian Premier League are included.

== Armenian Premier League 2026-27 ==
=== Alashkert ===
In: Note: Flags indicate national team as defined under FIFA eligibility rules; some limited exceptions apply. Players may hold more than one non-FIFA nationality.

No.	Pos.	Nation	Player
3	DF	BRA	Cézar (from (Azerbaijan) Şamaxı)
6	MF	NGR	Hussein Muiz Adebayo (from (Russia) Vista)
14	FW	CGO	Domi Massoumou (from (Azerbaijan) Qabala)
19	FW	NGR	Philip Ejike (from (Bulgaria) Montana)
20	MF	MLI	Daouda Togola (from (Russia) Vista)
55	DF	ARM	Hakob Hakobyan (from Ararat-Armenia)
77	MF	ARM	Daniyel Agbalyan (from (Armenia) Pyunik)
99	GK	SLE	Ibrahim Sesay (loan return from (Armenia) Andranik)
—	FW	NGR	Obi Chima (loan return from (Armenia) Andranik)

Out: Note: Flags indicate national team as defined under FIFA eligibility rules; some limited exceptions apply. Players may hold more than one non-FIFA nationality.

No.	Pos.	Nation	Player
2	DF	ARM	Serob Grigoryan (to (Armenia) Gandzasar)
3	DF	NGR	Samuel Segun
8	MF	ARM	Yuri Gareginyan (Retired)
9	FW	NGR	Khalil Ahmad Sammani (on loan to (Armenia) Van)
13	GK	ARM	Anatoliy Ayvazov (to (Armenia) Gandzasar)
19	FW	GAM	Kajally Drammeh (to (United Arab Emirates) Fujairah)
25	FW	BRA	Caio Henrique (loan return to (Brazil) Audax)
28	FW	NGR	Usman Ajibona (on loan to (Russia) Torpedo Moscow)
44	DF	BRA	Klaidher Macedo (to (Kazakhstan) Kaisar)
66	DF	ARM	Mher Kankanyan (to (Armenia) Gandzasar)
73	MF	ARM	David Kirakosyan (to (Russia) Spartak Kostroma)
77	MF	VEN	Juan Campos (on loan to (United Arab Emirates) Al Wasl)
—	DF	ARM	Yuri Martirosyan (to (Armenia) Van, previously on loan to (Armenia) Gandzasar)
—	MF	GHA	Kofi Duffour (released, previously on loan to (Armenia) Gandzasar)

=== Ararat-Armenia ===
In: Note: Flags indicate national team as defined under FIFA eligibility rules; some limited exceptions apply. Players may hold more than one non-FIFA nationality.

No.	Pos.	Nation	Player
5	DF	BRA	Luis Felipe (from (Cyprus) Ethnikos Achna)
14	DF	POR	Bruno Pereira (from (Portugal) Penafiel)
17	MF	FRA	Maxence Carlier (from (France) Nancy)
43	DF	POR	Bruno Wilson
70	MF	POR	Benny (from (Angola) Petro de Luanda)
91	FW	BRA	Sandro Lima (from (Portugal) Alverca)
95	MF	BRA	França (from (Indonesia) Persijap Jepara)
98	GK	BRA	João Bravim (from (Portugal) Santa Clara)
—	GK	ARM	Andranik Martirosyan (from (Armenia) Ararat Yerevan)

Out: Note: Flags indicate national team as defined under FIFA eligibility rules; some limited exceptions apply. Players may hold more than one non-FIFA nationality.

No.	Pos.	Nation	Player
4	DF	POR	João Queirós
5	DF	ARM	Hakob Hakobyan (to (Armenia) Alashkert)
21	MF	ARM	Narek Alaverdyan (to (Armenia) Ararat Yerevan, previously on loan to (Armenia) Gandzasar)
22	FW	ARM	Misak Hakobyan (to (Armenia) Sardarapat)
24	GK	POR	Bruno Pinto (to (Portugal) Leça)
28	MF	ARM	Davit Barseghyan (to (Armenia) Syunik)
33	DF	MAR	Bouchaib Arrassi (loan return to (Morocco) Raja CA)
44	MF	ARM	Vahe Petrosyan
88	MF	BRA	Welton (to (Georgia (country)) Dinamo Tbilisi)
99	MF	BRA	João Lima (to (Portugal) Tondela)

=== Ararat Yerevan ===
In: Note: Flags indicate national team as defined under FIFA eligibility rules; some limited exceptions apply. Players may hold more than one non-FIFA nationality.

No.	Pos.	Nation	Player
8	MF	ARM	Petros Alekyan (on loan from (Armenia) Pyunik)
9	MF	ARM	Benik Hovhannisyan (from (Armenia) Van)
11	MF	ARM	Narek Alaverdyan (from Ararat-Armenia)
13	GK	RUS	Nikita Lobusov (from (Armenia) Gandzasar Kapan)
14	DF	ARM	Arman Khachatryan (from (Armenia) Gandzasar Kapan)
17	MF	ARM	Edgar Movsesyan (from (Greece) Chania)
33	DF	ARM	Varazdat Haroyan

Out: Note: Flags indicate national team as defined under FIFA eligibility rules; some limited exceptions apply. Players may hold more than one non-FIFA nationality.

No.	Pos.	Nation	Player
5	DF	ARM	Artur Kartashyan (to (Armenia) Van)
8	MF	MLI	Abdoul Karim Djire
9	MF	ARM	Gor Lulukyan (to (Armenia) Urartu)
11	FW	CIV	Yaya Sogodogo (to (Indonesia) Persijap Jepara)
12	DF	GHA	Clinton Dombila (to (Armenia) Noah)
14	FW	NGR	Prince Emmanuel Obinna (to (Armenia) Van)
15	FW	MLI	Kalifala Doumbia (to (Armenia) Noah)
17	FW	GUI	Amadou Diakité
71	GK	ARM	Andranik Martirosyan (to Ararat-Armenia)
78	DF	RSA	Aphelele Modolwana

=== BKMA Yerevan ===
In: Note: Flags indicate national team as defined under FIFA eligibility rules; some limited exceptions apply. Players may hold more than one non-FIFA nationality.

No.	Pos.	Nation	Player

Out: Note: Flags indicate national team as defined under FIFA eligibility rules; some limited exceptions apply. Players may hold more than one non-FIFA nationality.

No.	Pos.	Nation	Player
4	DF	ARM	Mark Avetisyan (to (Armenia) Noah)
5	DF	ARM	Petik Manukyan (to (Armenia) Urartu)
77	GK	ARM	Davit Davtyan (to (Armenia) Noah)

=== Gandzasar Kapan ===
In: Note: Flags indicate national team as defined under FIFA eligibility rules; some limited exceptions apply. Players may hold more than one non-FIFA nationality.

No.	Pos.	Nation	Player
2	MF	ARM	Artur Mikhaelyan (from (Armenia) Pyunik)
3	DF	ARM	Mher Kankanyan (from (Armenia) Alashkert)
5	DF	ARM	Serob Grigoryan (from (Armenia) Alashkert)
6	DF	BRA	Átila (from (Moldova) Sheriff Tiraspol)
10	MF	ARM	Artur Israelyan (from (Armenia) Urartu)
11	MF	BRA	João Adriano (from (Brazil) Athletic Club)
13	GK	ARM	Anatoliy Ayvazov (from (Armenia) Alashkert)
18	MF	ARM	Artyom Avanesyan (from (Armenia) Noah)
21	MF	POR	Leo Reis (from (Portugal) Ferreiras)
22	DF	ARM	Marat Asatryan (from (Armenia) BKMA Yerevan)
33	DF	BRA	Robson Junior (from (Slovakia) Rimavská Sobota)
34	MF	AUT	Dean Titkov (from (Austria) First Vienna)
79	MF	POR	Tomas Rocha (from (Portugal) Sanjoanense)
—	GK	ARM	Davit Davtyan (on loan from (Armenia) Noah)
—	FW	MLI	Kalifala Doumbia (on loan from (Armenia) Noah)
—	MF	BEN	Mariano Ahouangbo (from (Slovenia) Olimpija Ljubljana, previously on loan)

Out: Note: Flags indicate national team as defined under FIFA eligibility rules; some limited exceptions apply. Players may hold more than one non-FIFA nationality.

No.	Pos.	Nation	Player
2	DF	ARM	Petros Manukyan
4	DF	ARM	Taron Voskanyan
10	MF	ARM	Levon Petrosyan (loan return to (Armenia) Pyunik)
11	MF	ARM	Narek Alaverdyan (loan return to Ararat-Armenia)
12	GK	ARM	Rafael Manasyan
14	MF	NGR	Ofoeke Chibuike Emmanuel (to (Israel) Bnei Yehuda Tel Aviv)
17	MF	ARM	Davit Davtyan (loan return to (Armenia) Noah)
18	FW	RUS	Grisha Paronyan
19	MF	NGR	Haggai Katoh
22	DF	ARM	Yuri Martirosyan (loan return to (Armenia) Alashkert)
27	DF	CMR	Jerzino Ntolo
31	GK	RUS	Nikita Lobusov (to (Armenia) Ararat Yerevan)
33	MF	ARM	Vahagn Hayrapetyan
47	MF	CMR	Dilane Ekongolo
66	MF	GHA	Kofi Duffour (loan return to (Armenia) Alashkert)
70	MF	UKR	Danylo Malov (loan return to (Slovenia) Olimpija Ljubljana)
77	DF	ARM	Arman Khachatryan (to (Armenia) Ararat Yerevan)
79	MF	POR	João Nóbrega
88	FW	IRI	Arwin Kalmarzy

=== Noah ===
In: Note: Flags indicate national team as defined under FIFA eligibility rules; some limited exceptions apply. Players may hold more than one non-FIFA nationality.

No.	Pos.	Nation	Player
4	MF	COD	Stone Mambo (from (France) Grenoble)
5	DF	ARM	Mark Avetisyan (from (Armenia) BKMA Yerevan)
8	FW	SRB	Marko Lazetić (from (Scotland) Aberdeen)
9	FW	ESP	Mario González (from (Spain) Burgos)
12	DF	GHA	Clinton Dombila (from (Armenia) Ararat Yerevan)
21	DF	SLO	Michael Pavlović (from (Romania) Botoșani)
77	GK	ARM	Davit Davtyan (from (Armenia) BKMA Yerevan)
98	FW	GHA	Brian Oddei (from (Slovenia) Koper)
99	GK	POR	Dani Figueira (from (Portugal) Gil Vicente)

Out: Note: Flags indicate national team as defined under FIFA eligibility rules; some limited exceptions apply. Players may hold more than one non-FIFA nationality.

No.	Pos.	Nation	Player
4	DF	BEL	Rob Nizet (to (Greece) Iraklis)
8	FW	POR	Gonçalo Gregório (to (Germany) Waldhof Mannheim)
9	FW	BRA	Matheus Aiás (to (South Korea) Jeju SK)
11	MF	NED	Imran Oulad Omar (to (Georgia (country)) Dinamo Batumi)
18	MF	ARM	Artyom Avanesyan (to (Armenia) Gandzasar)
18	FW	MLI	Kalifala Doumbia (on loan to (Armenia) Gandzasar, previously from (Armenia) Ararat Yerevan)
32	FW	BIH	Nardin Mulahusejnović (to (Serbia) Vojvodina)
37	DF	POR	Gonçalo Silva (to (Portugal) Farense)
44	DF	BIH	Nermin Zolotić (to (Portugal) Farense)
77	GK	ARM	Davit Davtyan (on loan to (Armenia) Gandzasar)
92	GK	RUS	Aleksey Ploshchadny
99	MF	ARM	Hovhannes Harutyunyan (to (Armenia) Pyunik)

=== Pyunik ===
In: Note: Flags indicate national team as defined under FIFA eligibility rules; some limited exceptions apply. Players may hold more than one non-FIFA nationality.

No.	Pos.	Nation	Player
4	DF	ARM	Erik Simonyan (from (Armenia) Urartu)
10	MF	NED	Iman Griffith (from (Netherlands) Roda)
11	MF	ARM	Hovhannes Harutyunyan (from (Armenia) Noah)
23	MF	MOZ	Witi (from (Portugal) Nacional)
29	FW	CYP	Iasonas Pikis (from (Cyprus) Olympiakos Nicosia)
44	MF	ARM	Hayk Tatosyan (loan return from (Armenia) Van)

Out: Note: Flags indicate national team as defined under FIFA eligibility rules; some limited exceptions apply. Players may hold more than one non-FIFA nationality.

No.	Pos.	Nation	Player
2	DF	BRA	Alemão (to (Portugal) Amarante)
10	MF	ESP	Javi Moreno (to (Spain) Real Murcia)
13	MF	ARM	Daniyel Agbalyan (to (Armenia) Alashkert)
18	MF	ARM	Karlen Hovhannisyan (to (Russia) Akron Tolyatti)
20	MF	BRA	Lucas Villela
26	DF	SRB	Aleksandar Miljković (to (Serbia) Novi Pazar)
33	FW	GHA	Eric Ocansey (to (Serbia) Javor Ivanjica)
95	FW	GUI	Momo Yansané
99	FW	CMR	Marius Noubissi (to (Israel) Hapoel Ramat Gan Givatayim)
—	MF	ARM	Petros Alekyan (on loan to (Armenia) Ararat Yerevan)
—	MF	ARM	Tigran Gevorgyan (on loan to (Armenia) Van)
—	MF	ARM	Levon Petrosyan (to (Armenia) Sardarapat, previously on loan to (Armenia) Gandzasar)

=== Sardarapat ===
In: Note: Flags indicate national team as defined under FIFA eligibility rules; some limited exceptions apply. Players may hold more than one non-FIFA nationality.

No.	Pos.	Nation	Player
5	DF	SEN	Ousmane Konaté (from (Senegal) AS Douanes)
8	MF	ARM	Levon Petrosyan (from (Armenia) Pyunik)
39	GK	ARM	Gor Matinyan (from (Armenia) Urartu)
44	DF	ARM	Artur Daniyelyan
—	MF	CIV	Jean Seri (from (Ivory Coast) SOL)
—	MF	NGR	Sulaiman Alabi (from (Nigeria) El-Kanemi Warriors)
—	FW	ARM	Misak Hakobyan (from Ararat-Armenia)

Out: Note: Flags indicate national team as defined under FIFA eligibility rules; some limited exceptions apply. Players may hold more than one non-FIFA nationality.

No.	Pos.	Nation	Player
2	DF	ARM	Hayk Simonyan
5	DF	ARM	Ishkhan Darbinyan (loan return to (Armenia) Pyunik)
8	FW	ARM	Vrezh Mkrtchyan
15	DF	ARM	Artur Melikyan (loan return to (Armenia) Urartu)
18	MF	ARM	Gor Vanoyan
29	FW	MTN	Abderahmane Ndaw

=== Shirak ===
In: Note: Flags indicate national team as defined under FIFA eligibility rules; some limited exceptions apply. Players may hold more than one non-FIFA nationality.

No.	Pos.	Nation	Player
3	DF	CIV	Donassy Ibrahim Coulibaly (from (Ivory Coast) CO Korhogo)
27	MF	CIV	Fofana Amara Karamoko (from (Ivory Coast) CO Korhogo)
28	MF	CIV	Ladji Lancine Bamba (from (Ivory Coast) CO Korhogo)
45	GK	RUS	Vsevolod Ermakov (from (Russia) Volgar Astrakhan)
71	FW	CIV	Bamba Mesamba
90	MF	GHA	Raymond Giamfi

Out: Note: Flags indicate national team as defined under FIFA eligibility rules; some limited exceptions apply. Players may hold more than one non-FIFA nationality.

No.	Pos.	Nation	Player

=== Syunik ===
In: Note: Flags indicate national team as defined under FIFA eligibility rules; some limited exceptions apply. Players may hold more than one non-FIFA nationality.

No.	Pos.	Nation	Player
2	DF	ARM	Arsen Galstyan (from (Armenia) Van)
3	DF	ARM	Gor Arakelyan (from (Armenia) BKMA Yerevan)
4	DF	TUN	Amanallah Souassi (from (Tunisia) CS Hammam-Lif)
7	FW	BRA	Kaique Santos (from (Angola) Académica Lobito)
19	FW	ARM	Samvel Sargsyan (loan return from (Armenia) BKMA Yerevan)
21	FW	GHA	Rabbi Annor (from (Ghana) Mountaineers)
23	MF	GHA	Kobbie Jones Enning (from (Ghana) Mountaineers)
24	MF	ARM	Davit Barseghyan (from Ararat-Armenia)
29	FW	ANG	João Brito (from (Portugal) Vila Meã)
30	FW	NGR	Godwin Kalu (from (Tunisia) AS Marsa)
31	FW	NGR	Godswill Odinakachi (from (Tunisia) Stade Tunisien)
33	MF	ARM	Vahagn Hayrapetyan (from (Armenia) Gandzasar)
72	GK	POR	Diogo Sá (from (Portugal) Marialvas)
77	DF	POR	Miguel Silva (from (Portugal) Covilhã)
90	GK	ARM	Arman Ghukasyan (from (Armenia) Hayk)

Out: Note: Flags indicate national team as defined under FIFA eligibility rules; some limited exceptions apply. Players may hold more than one non-FIFA nationality.

No.	Pos.	Nation	Player
16	GK	ARM	Poghos Ayvazyan
27	DF	BFA	Luc Zango
28	MF	FRA	Joachim Amijekori
29	DF	POR	João Mendes
37	MF	BRA	Gabriel Paz
66	DF	ARM	Alik Mkrtchyan
73	GK	ARM	Arman Simonyan
80	FW	COL	Juan David Moreno (to (Guatemala) Antigua)
90	FW	BRA	Rafael Nadal

=== Urartu ===
In: Note: Flags indicate national team as defined under FIFA eligibility rules; some limited exceptions apply. Players may hold more than one non-FIFA nationality.

No.	Pos.	Nation	Player
6	DF	ARM	Petik Manukyan (from (Armenia) BKMA Yerevan)
9	FW	POR	Miguel Rajani (from (Portugal) Leixões)
15	DF	UKR	Vladyslav Veremeev (from (Azerbaijan) Şamaxı)
19	DF	ARM	Artur Melikyan (loan return from (Armenia) Sardarapat)
28	MF	JPN	Katsuyuki Ishibashi (from (Singapore) Jurong)
77	MF	ARM	Gor Lulukyan (from (Armenia) Ararat Yerevan)

Out: Note: Flags indicate national team as defined under FIFA eligibility rules; some limited exceptions apply. Players may hold more than one non-FIFA nationality.

No.	Pos.	Nation	Player
1	GK	ARM	Gor Matinyan (to (Armenia) Sardarapat)
2	MF	RUS	Artemi Gunko (to (Russia) Volna Kovernino)
9	FW	FRA	Alexandre Llovet (to (Cyprus) AEP Polemidion)
11	DF	NGR	Okezie Ebenezer
23	FW	ARM	Nicholas Kaloukian (to (United States) Carolina Core)
55	DF	ARM	Erik Simonyan (to (Armenia) Pyunik)
77	MF	ARM	Artur Israelyan (to (Armenia) Gandzasar)
90	MF	RUS	Oleg Polyakov (Retirement)

=== Van ===
In: Note: Flags indicate national team as defined under FIFA eligibility rules; some limited exceptions apply. Players may hold more than one non-FIFA nationality.

No.	Pos.	Nation	Player
3	DF	ARM	Artur Kartashyan (from (Armenia) Ararat Yerevan)
5	DF	ARM	Hovhannes Gevorgyan (from (Brazil) Bentonit)
14	FW	NGR	Prince Emmanuel Obinna (from (Armenia) Ararat Yerevan)
15	DF	NGR	Adedayo Akanni (from (Nigeria) China Sunstars)
20	DF	BRA	Iago Viana (from (Brazil) i9)
21	DF	ZAM	Chimuka Lweendo (from (Zambia) Atletico Lusaka)
22	DF	ARM	Yuri Martirosyan (from (Armenia) Alashkert)
25	DF	GHA	Enoch Mensah (from (Armenia) Hayk)
28	FW	CIV	Kone Boukari (from (Lithuania) Banga Gargždai)
38	MF	ARM	Tigran Gevorgyan (on loan from (Armenia) Pyunik)
77	FW	BRA	Brayann (from (Brazil) Terceiro Milênio)
—	DF	ARM	Sargis Gaboyan (on loan from (Belgium) Eendracht Termien)
—	FW	NGR	Khalil Ahmad Sammani (on loan from (Armenia) Alashkert)
—	FW	BRA	Rafael Jesus (from (Brazil) Atlético Mineiro)

Out: Note: Flags indicate national team as defined under FIFA eligibility rules; some limited exceptions apply. Players may hold more than one non-FIFA nationality.

No.	Pos.	Nation	Player
1	GK	ARM	Gor Manukyan
3	DF	BRA	Ferreira
4	DF	GEO	Saba Sidamonidze (to (Georgia (country)) Odishi 1919)
4	DF	ARM	Lucas Arceli
5	DF	ARM	Hrayr Mkoyan
8	MF	ARM	Hayk Tatosyan (loan return to (Armenia) Pyunik)
8	MF	BRA	Maurinho (to (Armenia) Andranik)
9	FW	HAI	Jonel Désiré
10	MF	ARM	Benik Hovhannisyan (to (Armenia) Ararat Yerevan)
12	GK	BRA	Lucas Arceli
14	DF	NGR	Henry Onwukwe
17	DF	GEO	Nikolozi Sajaia (to (Georgia (country)) Torpedo Kutaisi)
18	MF	BRA	Samuel Reis
19	MF	NGR	Emeka Maduka
22	DF	RUS	Artur Zagorodnikov
24	MF	ARM	Arsen Galstyan (to (Armenia) Syunik)
25	MF	NGR	Emmanuel Nnamani (to (Armenia) Mika)
26	DF	UKR	Andriy Markovych (to (Kyrgyzstan) Toktogul)
77	FW	GEO	Davit Krasovski (to (Georgia (country)) Samgurali Tskaltubo)
87	DF	ARG	Juan Perrotta
97	DF	ESP	Miquel Bonnin
