= 2026–27 FC Urartu season =

Urartu
2026–27 season
- CEO: Artur Sahakyan
- Manager: Robert Arzumanyan (until 28 October); Francisco Compan (Interim) (28 October - 3 November); Hayk Milkon (from 3 November)
- Stadium: Urartu Stadium
- Premier League: 6th
- Armenian Cup: Round of 16
- Top goalscorer: League: Miguel Rajani (5); All: Miguel Rajani (5)
Home colours	Away colours

The 2026–27 season is FC Urartu's twenty-sixth consecutive season in the Armenian Premier League.

== Season overview ==
On 4 July, Urartu announced the signing of Katsuyuki Ishibashi from Jurong.

On 5 July, Urartu announced the signing of Gor Lulukyan from Ararat Yerevan.

On 6 July, Urartu announced the signing of Petik Manukyan from BKMA Yerevan.

On 8 July, Urartu announced the signing of Vladyslav Veremeev from Şamaxı.

On 11 July, Urartu announced the signing of Miguel Rajani from Leixões.

On 15 August, Oleg Polyakov announced his retirement from football.

On 11 September, Urartu announced the signing of Oege-Sietse van Lingen from Chonburi.

On 28 October, Urartu announced that Robert Arzumanyan had left his position of Head Coach but mutual agreement, and that Francisco Compan had been placed in temporary charge. On 3 November, Urartu announced the appointment of Hayk Milkon as their new Head Coach.

== Squad ==
As of match played 30 October 2026

Number	Name	Nationality	Position	Date of birth (age)	Signed from	Signed in	Contract ends	Apps.	Goals
Goalkeepers
16	Nubar Gishyan	(Armenia)	GK	22 October 2008 (age 18)	Academy	2026		0	0
33	Andrija Dragojević	(Montenegro)	GK	25 December 1991 (age 34)	West Armenia	2025		5	0
92	Aleksandr Mishiyev	(Russia)	GK	29 January 2004 (age 22)	Mashuk-KMV Pyatigorsk	2023		38	0
Defenders
3	Erik Piloyan	(Armenia)	DF	29 January 2001 (age 25)	Academy	2019		123	4
4	Arman Ghazaryan	(Armenia)	DF	24 July 2001 (age 25)	Academy	2019		101	5
6	Petik Manukyan	(Armenia)	DF	21 February 2006 (age 20)	BKMA Yerevan	2026		5	0
15	Vladyslav Veremeev	(Ukraine)	DF	25 September 1998 (age 28)	Şamaxı	2026		8	0
18	Anton Bratkov	(Ukraine)	DF	14 May 1993 (age 33)	Pyunik	2025		37	2
44	Yevhen Tsymbalyuk	(Ukraine)	DF	19 June 1996 (age 30)	Concordia Chiajna	2025		84	4
66	Zhora Dadamyan	(Armenia)	DF	26 November 2007 (age 18)	Academy	2024		1	0
88	Zhirayr Margaryan	(Armenia)	DF	13 September 1997 (age 29)	Veres Rivne	2022		162	5
99	Khariton Ayvazyan	(Armenia)	DF	8 November 2003 (age 22)	Academy	2020		89	3
Midfielders
5	Alef Santos	(Brazil)	MF	6 November 1996 (age 29)	Dinamo Batumi	2025		46	1
7	Sergey Mkrtchyan	(Armenia)	MF	26 June 2001 (age 25)	Academy	2021		100	3
8	Narek Agasaryan	(Armenia)	MF	15 July 2001 (age 25)	Academy	2021		153	7
14	Artem Polyarus	(Ukraine)	MF	5 July 1992 (age 34)	Zagłębie Sosnowiec	2024		50	5
21	Levon Bashoyan	(Armenia)	MF	15 September 2005 (age 21)	Academy	2022		13	0
22	Mikayel Mirzoyan	(Armenia)	MF	6 February 2001 (age 25)	BKMA Yerevan	2023		77	8
23	Garnik Minasyan	(Armenia)	MF	12 July 2005 (age 21)	Academy	2024		0	0
28	Katsuyuki Ishibashi	(Japan)	MF	1 October 2002 (age 24)	Jurong	2026		13	2
30	Bruno Michel	(Brazil)	MF	1 June 1999 (aged 26)	Figueirense	2025		54	27
77	Gor Lulukyan	(Armenia)	MF	1 February 2003 (age 23)	Ararat Yerevan	2026		11	1
Forwards
9	Miguel Rajani	(Portugal)	FW	18 June 2003 (age 23)	Caldas	2026		13	9
10	Karen Melkonyan	(Armenia)	FW	25 March 1999 (age 27)	Academy	2017		223	31
11	Edik Vardanyan	(Armenia)	FW	25 March 2005 (age 21)	Academy	2022		32	3
27	Miguel Velosa	(Portugal)	FW	28 March 2000 (age 26)	Caldas	2026		26	5
91	Oege-Sietse van Lingen	(Netherlands)	FW	21 October 1999 (age 27)	Chonburi	2026		7	3
Players away on loan
19	Artur Melikyan	(Armenia)	DF	30 June 2002 (age 24)	Academy	2020		3	0
Players who left during the season
90	Oleg Polyakov	(Russia)	MF	29 November 1990 (age 35)	Armavir	2020		150	12

== Transfers ==
=== In ===
Date	Position	Nationality	Name	From	Fee	Ref.
4 July 2026	MF	(Japan)	Katsuyuki Ishibashi	Jurong	Undisclosed	
5 July 2026	MF	(Armenia)	Gor Lulukyan	Ararat Yerevan	Undisclosed	
6 July 2026	DF	(Armenia)	Petik Manukyan	BKMA Yerevan	Undisclosed	
8 July 2026	DF	(Ukraine)	Vladyslav Veremeev	Şamaxı	Undisclosed	
11 July 2026	FW	(Portugal)	Miguel Rajani	Leixões	Undisclosed	
11 September 2026	FW	(Netherlands)	Oege-Sietse van Lingen	Chonburi	Undisclosed	

=== Loans out ===
Date from	Position	Nationality	Name	To	Date to	Ref.
15 September 2026	DF	(Armenia)	Artur Melikyan	Syunik	End of season	

=== Released ===
Date	Position	Nationality	Name	Joined	Date	Ref
28 July 2026	MF	(Russia)	Artemi Gunko	Volna Kovernino		
15 August 2026	MF	(Russia)	Oleg Polyakov	Retirement		

== Competitions ==
=== Overview ===
Competition	First match	Last match	Starting round	Record							
Competition	First match	Last match	Starting round	Pld	W	D	L	GF	GA	GD	Win %
Premier League	2 August 2026		Matchday 1	12	4	4	4	19	15	+4	33.33
Armenian Cup	27 October 2026		Last 16	1	1	0	0	3	2	+1	100.00
Total				13	5	4	4	22	17	+5	38.46

Last updated: 30 October 2026
Source: Competitions

=== Premier League ===
==== Results summary ====
Overall								Home						Away					
Pld	W	D	L	GF	GA	GD	Pts	W	D	L	GF	GA	GD	W	D	L	GF	GA	GD
12	4	4	4	19	15	+4	16	2	3	1	13	10	+3	2	1	3	6	5	+1

Last updated: 30 October 2026.
Source: See Results

==== Results by round ====
Round	1	2	3	4	5	6	7	8	9	10	11	12
Ground	H	A	H	A	H	A	H	A	H	H	A	A
Result	D	L	W	W	D	L	L	W	D	W	D	L
Position	6	8	6	6	6	7	7	6	5	5	5	6
Points	1	1	4	7	8	8	8	11	12	15	16	16

Updated to match(es) played on 30 October 2026. Source: See Results
A = Away; H = Home; W = Win; D = Draw; L = Loss; P = Bye

==== Results ====
2 August 2026 1	Urartu	2–2	Pyunik	Yerevan
21:00 (UTC+4)		Report	Griffith 8'; Tarakhchyan 69'; Darbinyan (yellow card) 74'; Kovalenko (yellow card) 90' (yellow-red card) 90'	Stadium: Urartu Stadium; Referee: Hovhannes Kalantaryan

7 August 2026 2	Ararat-Armenia	2–1	Urartu	Abovyan
19:00 (UTC+4)	Ndour 22'; França (yellow card) 33'; Benny 81'; Felipe (yellow card) 88'	Report	Rajani 31'; Piloyan (yellow card) 70'; Velosa (yellow card) 90'	Stadium: Vahagn Tumasyan Stadium; Referee: Zaven Hovhannisyan

13 August 2026 3	Urartu	3–0	Syunik	Yerevan
19:00 (UTC+4)	Rajani 23'; Michel 84' (pen.), 90+1' (pen.); Mirzoyan (yellow card) 85'	Report	G.Arakelyan (yellow card) 44'; Brito (yellow card) 69'; Arakelyan (yellow card) 90+8'	Stadium: Urartu Stadium; Referee: Yura Mahtesyan

22 August 2026 4	Shirak	0–1	Urartu	Gyumri
18:00 (UTC+4)	Misakyan (yellow card) 39'; Gyamfi (yellow card) 80'	Report	Lulukyan (yellow card) 40'; Ishibashi 67'	Stadium: City Stadium; Referee: Artak Vardanyan

28 August 2026 5	Urartu	1–1	Alashkert	Yerevan
20:00 (UTC+4)	Rajani 14' (yellow card) 78'; Veremeev (yellow card) 45+1'	Report	Touré (yellow card) 48' (goal) 80'; Terteryan (yellow card) 78'; Banda (yellow card) 90+2'	Stadium: Urartu Stadium; Referee: Zaven Hovhannisyan

6 September 2026 6	BKMA Yerevan	2–1	Urartu	Yerevan
17:00 (UTC+4)	Dokhoyan (yellow card) 28'; Hovhannisyan 21', 68'; Askaryan (yellow card) 45'; Ar.Petrosyan (yellow card) 59'	Report	Manukyan (yellow card) 35'; Velosa (yellow card) 51'; Rajani 58'	Stadium: Academy Stadium; Referee: Henrik Nalbandian

12 September 2026 7	Urartu	0–3	Noah	Yerevan
20:00 (UTC+4)		Report	Ferreira 31', 49'; Mambo (yellow card) 41'; Lazetić 43'; Manvelyan (yellow card) 62'	Stadium: Urartu Stadium; Referee: Henrik Nalbandian

18 September 2026 8	Gandzasar	0–3	Urartu	Yerevan
18:00 (UTC+4)	Mani (yellow card) 47'; Mikhaelyan (yellow card) 56'; Titkov (yellow card) 74'; Lizalda (yellow card) 82'	Report	Veremeev (yellow card) 3'; Rajani 17'; Velosa 18'; Ghazaryan 33'; Bashoyan (yellow card) 54'; Tsymbalyuk (yellow card) 75'; Santos (yellow card) 85'	Stadium: Junior Sport Stadium; Referee: Hovhannes Kalantaryan

11 October 2026 9	Urartu	2–2	Ararat Yerevan	Yerevan
20:00 (UTC+4)	Ishibashi 35'; Lulukyan 79'	Report	Aslanyan 12'; Samsonyan (yellow card) 19'; Bakayoko 87'	Stadium: Urartu Stadium; Referee: Artem Gasparyan

17 October 2026 10	Urartu	5–2	Van	Yerevan
17:00 (UTC+4)	Rajani 25', 64'; Lulukyan (yellow card) 38' van Lingen 54', 86' (yellow card) 90'; Bratkov (yellow card) 60'; Mirzoyan 90+3'	Report	Sammani 18', 56'; Voskanyan (yellow card) 30'; Nascimento (yellow card) 31'; Avetisyan (yellow card) 48'; Torres (yellow card) 62'; Makhsudyan (yellow card) 80'	Stadium: Urartu Stadium; Referee: Sargis Khachatryan

22 October 2026 11	Sardarapat	0–0	Urartu	Yerevan
19:00 (UTC+4)	Budagyan (yellow card) 71'; Lago (yellow card) 88'	Report		Stadium: Urartu Stadium; Referee: Ashot Ghaltakhchyan

30 October 2026 12	Pyunik	1–0	Urartu	Yerevan
19:00 (UTC+4)	Pikis (yellow card) 5'; Kulikov (yellow card) 45'; Dashyan (yellow card) 58'; Darbinyan (yellow card) 81'; Kovalenko 87'	Report	Piloyan (yellow card) 7'; Mkrtchyan (yellow card) 90+4'	Stadium: Freedom Arena; Referee: Ashot Ghaltakhchyan

13	Urartu	–	Ararat-Armenia
(UTC+4)

21 November 2026 14	Syunik	–	Urartu	Sisian
15:00 (UTC+4)		Report		Stadium: City Stadium

==== League table ====
Pos	Team	Pld	W	D	L	GF	GA	GD	Pts	Qualification or relegation
1	Noah	12	10	1	1	31	10	+21	31	Qualification for the Champions League first qualifying round
2	Ararat-Armenia	12	9	2	1	24	10	+14	29	Qualification for the Conference League second qualifying round
3	Pyunik	12	8	4	0	28	9	+19	28	Qualification for the Conference League first qualifying round
4	Alashkert	12	7	4	1	27	8	+19	25	
5	Sardarapat	12	4	5	3	19	20	−1	17	
6	Urartu	12	4	4	4	19	15	+4	16	
7	Shirak	12	4	2	6	14	15	−1	14	
8	Van	12	3	2	7	12	29	−17	11	
9	Ararat Yerevan	12	3	2	7	10	20	−10	11	
10	Syunik	12	2	2	8	11	26	−15	8	
11	BKMA	12	2	2	8	10	22	−12	8	
12	Gandzasar Kapan	12	1	0	11	9	30	−21	3	Relegation to the Armenian First League

Updated to match(es) played on 1 November 2026. Source: FFA
Rules for classification: 1) Points; 2) Head-to-head points; 3) Head-to-head goal difference; 4) Head-to-head goals scored; 5) Matches won; 6) Goal difference; 7) Less red cards; 8) Less yellow cards ; 9) Fair-play ranking 10) Draw

=== Armenian Cup ===
27 October 2026 Round of 16	Urartu	3–2	Andranik	Yerevan
19:00 (UTC+4)	Rajani 25', 83' (pen.) van Lingen 32'	Report	Hovhannisyan 18', 39'; Ndidi (yellow card) 82'; Traore (yellow card) 90+5'	Stadium: Urartu Stadium; Referee: Artak Vardanyan

	–
(UTC+4)

== Squad statistics ==
As of match played 30 October 2026

=== Appearances and goals ===
No.	Pos	Nat	Player	Total		Premier League		Armenian Cup	
No.	Pos	Nat	Player	Apps	Goals	Apps	Goals	Apps	Goals
3	DF	(Armenia) ARM	Erik Piloyan	13	0	11+1	0	1	0
4	DF	(Armenia) ARM	Arman Ghazaryan	7	1	3+3	1	1	0
5	MF	(Brazil) BRA	Alef Santos	13	0	7+5	0	1	0
6	DF	(Armenia) ARM	Petik Manukyan	5	0	4	0	1	0
7	MF	(Armenia) ARM	Sergey Mkrtchyan	10	0	3+6	0	1	0
8	MF	(Armenia) ARM	Narek Agasaryan	13	0	11+1	0	0+1	0
9	FW	(Portugal) POR	Miguel Rajani	13	9	11+1	7	1	2
10	FW	(Armenia) ARM	Karen Melkonyan	6	0	2+4	0	0	0
11	FW	(Armenia) ARM	Edik Vardanyan	5	0	1+4	0	0	0
15	DF	(Ukraine) UKR	Vladyslav Veremeev	8	0	6+1	0	1	0
18	DF	(Ukraine) UKR	Anton Bratkov	10	0	9+1	0	0	0
21	MF	(Armenia) ARM	Levon Bashoyan	4	0	2+2	0	0	0
22	MF	(Armenia) ARM	Mikayel Mirzoyan	12	2	2+9	2	1	0
27	FW	(Portugal) POR	Miguel Velosa	12	1	4+7	1	1	0
28	MF	(Japan) JPN	Katsuyuki Ishibashi	13	2	12	2	0+1	0
30	MF	(Brazil) BRA	Bruno Michel	9	2	7+2	2	0	0
33	GK	(Montenegro) MNE	Andrija Dragojević	1	0	0	0	1	0
44	DF	(Ukraine) UKR	Yevhen Tsymbalyuk	7	0	6+1	0	0	0
66	DF	(Armenia) ARM	Zhora Dadamyan	1	0	1	0	0	0
77	MF	(Armenia) ARM	Gor Lulukyan	11	1	8+2	1	0+1	0
91	FW	(Netherlands) NED	Oege-Sietse van Lingen	7	3	2+4	2	1	1
92	GK	(Russia) RUS	Aleksandr Mishiyev	12	0	12	0	0	0
99	DF	(Armenia) ARM	Khariton Ayvazyan	12	0	8+3	0	0+1	0
Players away on loan:
Players who left Urartu during the season:

=== Goal scorers ===
Place	Position	Nation	Number	Name	Premier League	Armenian Cup	Total
1	FW	(Portugal)	9	Miguel Rajani	7	2	9
2	FW	(Netherlands)	91	Oege-Sietse van Lingen	2	1	3
3	MF	(Brazil)	30	Bruno Michel	2	0	2
3	MF	(Japan)	28	Katsuyuki Ishibashi	2	0	2
3	MF	(Armenia)	22	Mikayel Mirzoyan	2	0	2
6	FW	(Portugal)	27	Miguel Velosa	1	0	1
6	DF	(Armenia)	4	Arman Ghazaryan	1	0	1
6	MF	(Armenia)	77	Gor Lulukyan	1	0	1
6				Own goal	1	0	1
				TOTALS	19	3	22

=== Clean sheets ===
Place	Position	Nation	Number	Name	Premier League	Armenian Cup	Total
1	GK	(Russia)	92	Aleksandr Mishiyev	4	0	4
				TOTALS	4	0	3

=== Disciplinary record ===
Number	Nation	Position	Name	Premier League		Armenian Cup		Total	
Number	Nation	Position	Name	Yellow card	Red card	Yellow card	Red card	Yellow card	Red card
3	(Armenia)	DF	Erik Piloyan	2	0	0	0	2	0
5	(Brazil)	MF	Alef Santos	1	0	0	0	1	0
6	(Armenia)	DF	Petik Manukyan	1	0	0	0	1	0
7	(Armenia)	MF	Sergey Mkrtchyan	1	0	0	0	1	0
9	(Portugal)	FW	Rajani	1	0	0	0	1	0
15	(Ukraine)	DF	Vladyslav Veremeev	2	0	0	0	2	0
18	(Ukraine)	DF	Anton Bratkov	1	0	0	0	1	0
21	(Armenia)	MF	Levon Bashoyan	1	0	0	0	1	0
22	(Armenia)	MF	Mikayel Mirzoyan	1	0	0	0	1	0
27	(Portugal)	FW	Miguel Velosa	3	0	0	0	3	0
44	(Ukraine)	DF	Yevhen Tsymbalyuk	1	0	0	0	1	0
77	(Armenia)	MF	Gor Lulukyan	2	0	0	0	2	0
91	(Netherlands)	FW	Oege-Sietse van Lingen	1	0	0	0	1	0
Players away on loan:
Players who left Urartu during the season:
			TOTALS	18	0	0	0	18	0
