= 2026–27 Armenian Cup =

Tournament details
- Country: Armenia
- Teams: 22

Tournament statistics
- Matches played: 13
- Goals scored: 64 (4.92 per match)
- All statistics correct as of 29 October 2026.

The 2026–27 Armenian Cup is the 36th edition of the football competition in Armenia. The winners will qualify for the 2027–28 UEFA Conference League second qualifying round.

== Teams ==
Round	Clubs remaining	Clubs involved	Winners from previous round	New entries this round	Leagues entering at this round
Preliminary round	22	12	None	12	3 Amateur A-League teams 7 Armenian First League teams 2 Armenian Premier League teams
Round of 16	16	10	6	10	10 Armenian Premier League teams
Quarter-finals	8	8	8	none	none
Semi-finals	4	4	4	none	none
Final	2	2	2	none	none

== Preliminary round ==
On 2 July 2026, the Football Federation of Armenia announced the draw for the preliminary round. On 22 August, Hayk were expelled from the Armenian First League and the Armenian Cup, resulting in a bye to the Round of 16 for Olympia Yerevan.

24 August 2026	Hayk (2)	Walkover	Olympia Yerevan (2)	Vanadzor
16:00 (UTC+4)		Report		Stadium: City Stadium

24 August 2026	Avshar Ararat (2)	4–2	Kilikia (3)	Charentsavan
16:00 (UTC+4)	Lagbell 19', 63'; Er.Ghulinyan (yellow card) 30'; Lyansberg (yellow card) 61'; Ghulinyan 73'; Ghazaryan (yellow card) 79'; Hagy 90+4'	Report	Movsisyan 9', 31'; Polyakov (yellow card) 45'; Usoro (yellow card) 48'; Chifu (yellow card) 65'; Onuoha (red card) 70'	Stadium: City Stadium; Referee: Sargis Khachatryan

25 August 2026	Andranik (2)	5–0	Echmiadzin (3)	Charentsavan
16:00 (UTC+4)	Maurinho 8'; H.Hakobyan 29', 32', 39'; Yesayan (red card) 53'; Bilunga (yellow card) 55'; Zakaryan 90+3'	Report	Khlghatyan (yellow card) 18'; Fidanyan (yellow card) 90+3'	Stadium: City Stadium; Referee: Smbat Hakhverdyan

26 August 2026	Mika (2)	3–3 (a.e.t.) (2–3 p)	Bentonit (2)	Yerevan
16:00 (UTC+4)	Mekkaoui 9' (yellow card) 50' (yellow-red card) 82'; Hovsepyan 25'; Jindoyan (penalty missed) 25' 93'; Dilan (yellow card) 62'; Valpeters (yellow card) 90+7'; Grigoryan (yellow card) 109'	Report	Kabiru (yellow card) 22'; Valpeters 39' (o.g.); Arakelyan (yellow card) 69'; Mkrtchyan (yellow card) 72'; Manukyan 90+4' (pen.) (yellow card) 90+7'; Chobanyan (yellow card) 90+6' Asoyan (yellow card) 112'; Saghatelyan 115'	Stadium: Armenia Sports Union Stadium; Referee: Yura Mahtesyan
	Penalties
	Grigoryan (penalty scored); Ipaye (penalty scored); Manukyan (penalty scored); Muradyan (penalty scored)		(penalty scored) Chobanyan; (penalty scored) Kocharyan; (penalty scored) Manukyan; (penalty missed) Mkrtchyan; (penalty missed) Saghatelyan

26 August 2026	Lernayin Artsakh (2)	5–0	EcoVille (3)	Charentsavan
16:00 (UTC+4)	Baloyi 2', 15', 66'; Gabrielyan (yellow card) 41'; Aghekyan (yellow card) 72' (goal) 85'; Osuachalla (yellow card) 73'; S.Harutyunyan 87'	Report	Gevorgyan (red card) 51'; Margaryan (yellow card) 84'	Stadium: City Stadium; Referee: Narek Hakobyan

27 August 2026	Sardarapat (1)	1–1 (a.e.t.) (2–4 p)	Syunik (1)	Yerevan
16:00 (UTC+4)	Silva 14' (o.g.); Sargsyan (yellow card) 43'; Doumbia (yellow card) 102'; Alabi (yellow card) 108'	Report	Silva 41' (pen.); Poghikyan (yellow card) 44'; Enning (yellow card) 45+7'; Arakelyan (yellow card) 53'	Stadium: Academy Stadium; Referee: Henrik Nalbandian
	Penalties
	Ayunts (penalty scored); Vardanyan (penalty scored); Budaghyan (penalty missed); Potinyan (penalty missed)		(penalty scored) Litveacov; (penalty scored) Soghomonyan; (penalty scored) Hovhannisyan; (penalty scored) Silva

== Round of 16 ==
On 15 September 2026, the Football Federation of Armenia announced the draw for the Round of 16.

25 October 2026	Mika	0–0 (a.e.t.) (5–3 p)	Avshar Ararat	Yerevan
13:00 (UTC+4)	Valpeters (yellow card) 27'; Aslanyan (yellow card) 47'; Nnamani (yellow card) 49'; Jindoyan (yellow card) 49'; Muradyan (yellow card) 98' (yellow-red card) 98'	Report	Niakuri (yellow card) 19'; Shahgeldyan (yellow card) 47'; A.Khachatryan (yellow card) 72'; Aluo (yellow card) 119'	Stadium: Armenia Sports Union Stadium; Referee: Vardan Vardumyan
	Penalties
	Manukyan (penalty scored); Birba (penalty scored); Jindoyan (penalty scored); Ipaye (penalty scored); Kordzo (penalty scored)		(penalty scored) Ghulinyan; (penalty scored) A.Khachatryan; (penalty scored) Shahgeldyan

26 October 2026	Van	2–1 (a.e.t.)	Gandzasar	Charentsavan
15:00 (UTC+4)	Karapetyan (yellow card) 25'; Lweendo (yellow card) 29'; Hakobyan (yellow card) 35'; Makhsudyan (yellow card) 78'; Boukari (yellow card) 90' (goal) 110'; Avetisyan 90+2'	Report	Rocha 45'; Lizalda (yellow card) 50'; Kanda (yellow card) 76'; Adriano (yellow card) 90+4'	Stadium: City Stadium; Referee: Artem Gasparyan

27 October 2026	Pyunik	6–2	Ararat Yerevan	Yerevan
19:00 (UTC+4)	Griffith 5' (yellow card) 47'; Pikis 20', 32', 57'; Kenourgios (yellow card) 44'; Tarakhchyan 55'; Malakyan 70'	Report	Ukadike (yellow card) 40' (goal) 63'; Handzongo 81'	Stadium: Freedom Arena; Referee: Hovhannes Kalantaryan

27 October 2026	Urartu	3–2	Andranik	Yerevan
19:00 (UTC+4)	Rajani 25', 83' (pen.) van Lingen 32'	Report	Hovhannisyan 18', 39'; Ndidi (yellow card) 82'; Traore (yellow card) 90+5'	Stadium: Urartu Stadium; Referee: Artak Vardanyan

28 October 2026	Lernayin Artsakh	1–7	Shirak	Charentsavan
15:00 (UTC+4)	Petrosyan (yellow card) 42' (goal) 49'; Mkrtumyan (yellow card) 53'; Alamanjo (yellow card) 87'	Report	Misakyan 20' (pen.); Ghumashyan 28'; Gyamfi 37'; Fofana 42'; Manukyan 77'; Mesamba 81'; Sargsyan 83'	Stadium: City Stadium; Referee: Henrik Nalbandian

28 October 2026	Alashkert	4–0	BKMA Yerevan	Yerevan
18:00 (UTC+4)	Togola 24', 33', 60'; Banda 38'; Adebayo (yellow card) 65'	Report	Yedigaryan (yellow card) 23'	Stadium: Academy Stadium; Referee: Zaven Hovhannisyan

29 October 2026	Olympia Yerevan	1–4 (a.e.t.)	Ararat-Armenia	Ashtarak
15:30 (UTC+4)	Tamura (yellow card) 15'; Gabriel 30'; Asatryan (yellow card) 39'; H.Aleksanyan (yellow card) 67'; Bonilla (yellow card) 84'; Guilherme (yellow card) 105+2' (yellow-red card) 105+2'	Report	Ndour 15' (pen.) (penalty missed) 72'; Eloyan (yellow card) 98'; França (yellow card) 102' (goal) 119'; Benny 105+2'; Muradyan (yellow card) 107'; Grigoryan (yellow card) 110'; Carlier 115'	Stadium: Kasakhi Marzik Stadium; Referee: Narek Hayrapetyan

29 October 2026	Noah	4–3 (a.e.t.)	Syunik	Abovyan
19:00 (UTC+4)	Figueira (yellow card) 45+3'; Sangaré (yellow card) 65'; Sualehe 79', 100' (yellow card) 88'; Coneglian (yellow card) 83'; Boakye (yellow card) 90+3'; Ferreira 90+11' (pen.), 120+8' (yellow card) 120+9'; Lazetić (yellow card) 94'; Hambardzumyan (yellow card) 120+5'	Report	Kalu 23'; Odinakachi 38'; Hayrapetyan (yellow card) 52'; Annor (yellow card) 90'; Poghikyan 107'; Sá (yellow card) 108'	Stadium: Vahagn Tumasyan Stadium; Referee: David Mkrtchyan

== Goal scorers ==
As of match played 29 October 2026

3 goals:

- (Mali) Daouda Togola - Alashkert
- (Armenia) Hovsep Hakobyan - Andranik
- (South Africa) Vuthlarhi Baloyi - Lernayin Artsakh
- (Cyprus) Iasonas Pikis - Pyunik

2 goals:

- (Armenia) Narek Hovhannisyan - Andranik
- (Ghana) John Lagbell - Avshar Ararat
- (Armenia) Rafael Movsisyan - Kilikia
- (Portugal) Hélder Ferreira - Noah
- (Portugal) David Sualehe - Noah
- (Portugal) Miguel Rajani - Urartu

1 goals:

- (Zambia) Joseph Banda - Alashkert
- (Armenia) Vahe Zakaryan - Andranik
- (Brazil) Maurinho - Andranik
- (Brazil) França - Ararat-Armenia
- (France) Maxence Carlier - Ararat-Armenia
- (Portugal) Benny - Ararat-Armenia
- (Senegal) Alioune Ndour - Ararat-Armenia
- (Cameroon) Patrick Handzongo - Ararat Yerevan
- (Nigeria) Divine Ukadike - Ararat Yerevan
- (Armenia) Edgar Ghulinyan - Avshar Ararat
- (Egypt) Khalil Hagy - Avshar Ararat
- (Armenia) Samvel Manukyan - Bentonit
- (Armenia) Arman Saghatelyan - Bentonit
- (Portugal) Tomás Rocha - Gandzasar
- (Armenia) Levon Aghekyan - Lernayin Artsakh
- (Armenia) Tigran Petrosyan - Lernayin Artsakh
- (Armenia) Suren Harutyunyan - Lernayin Artsakh
- (Algeria) Abderahmane Mekkaoui - Mika
- (Armenia) Hovhannes Hovsepyan - Mika
- (Armenia) Akhmed Jindoyan - Mika
- (Brazil) Gabriel - Olympia Yerevan
- (Armenia) Edgar Malakyan - Pyunik
- (Armenia) Gevorg Tarakhchyan - Pyunik
- (Netherlands) Iman Griffith - Pyunik
- (Armenia) Sergey Manukyan - Shirak
- (Armenia) Rafik Misakyan - Shirak
- (Armenia) Vazgen Sargsyan - Shirak
- (Ghana) Raymond Gyamfi - Shirak
- (Ivory Coast) Amara Karamoko Fofana - Shirak
- (Ivory Coast) Bamba Mesamba - Shirak
- (Russia) Grigor Ghumashyan - Shirak
- (Armenia) Perch Poghikyan - Syunik
- (Nigeria) Godwin Kalu - Syunik
- (Nigeria) Godswill Odinakachi - Syunik
- (Portugal) Miguel Silva - Syunik
- (Netherlands) Oege-Sietse van Lingen - Urartu
- (Armenia) Petros Avetisyan - Van
- (Ivory Coast) Kone Boukari - Van

Own goals:

- (Latvia) Aleksejs Valpeters - Mika vs Bentonit 26 August 2026
- (Portugal) Miguel Silva - Sardarapat vs Syunik 27 August 2026

== See also ==
- Football in Armenia
- 2026–27 Armenian Premier League
- 2026–27 Armenian First League
