= 2026–27 FC Ararat-Armenia season =

Ararat-Armenia
2026-27 season
- Chairman: Rafik Hayrapetyan
- Manager: Tulipa
- Stadium: Academy Stadium; Vahagn Tumasyan Stadium
- Premier League: 3rd
- Armenian Cup: Pre-Season
- Armenian Supercup: Final
- UEFA Champions League: Third qualifying round vs Celje
- UEFA Europa League: League Phase
- Top goalscorer: League: Arayik Eloyan (4); All: Sandro Lima (5); França (5)
Home colours	Away colours

The 2026–27 season is FC Ararat-Armenia's 9th season in Armenian Premier League.

== Season overview ==
On 20 June, Ararat announced the signing of Luis Felipe from Ethnikos Achna.

On 25 June, Ararat announced the signing of França from Persijap Jepara.

On 27 June, Ararat announced the signing of Bruno Pereira from Penafiel.

On 2 July, Ararat announced the signing of João Bravim from Santa Clara.

On 3 July, after unveiling them the day before alongside Ararat's other summer signings, Ararat confirmed the signings of Bruno Wilson and Sandro Lima.

On 5 July, Ararat announced the signing of Maxence Carlier from Nancy.

On 3 August, Ararat announced the signing of Benny, who'd last played for Petro de Luanda.

On 9 August, Ararat announced the signing of Andranik Martirosyan from Ararat Yerevan.

On 12 September, Ararat announced that Artur Serobyan had signed permanently for Lechia Gdańsk, but would remain at Ararat-Armenia and then join Lechia Gdańsk on 1 February 2027.

== Squad ==
As of match played 6 November 2026

Number	Name	Nationality	Position	Date of birth (age)	Signed from	Signed in	Contract ends	Apps.	Goals
Goalkeepers
1	Arman Nersesyan	(Armenia)	GK	19 October 2001 (age 25)	Academy	2019	2028	21	0
12	Hayk Khachatryan	(Armenia)	GK	27 January 2005 (age 21)	Academy	2021		0	0
98	João Bravim	(Brazil)	GK	3 May 1998 (age 28)	Santa Clara	2026		17	0
	Shirak Badalyan	(Armenia)	GK	2 April 2006 (age 20)	Academy	2024		0	0
	Andranik Martirosyan	(Armenia)	GK	1 January 2003 (age 23)	Ararat Yerevan	2026		0	0
Defenders
2	Hugo Oliveira	(Portugal)	DF	10 February 2002 (age 24)	Vizela	2025		52	7
3	Junior Bueno (Note: Junior Bueno was born in Colombia, but qualified to represent Armenia, making his debut in March 2026.)	(Armenia)	DF	3 September 1996 (age 30)	Once Caldas	2021		173	5
5	Luis Felipe	(Brazil)	DF	17 May 2001 (age 25)	Ethnikos Achna	2026		15	0
13	Kamo Hovhannisyan	(Armenia)	DF	5 October 1992 (age 34)	Unattached	2024		87	3
14	Bruno Pereira	(Portugal)	DF	27 January 1998 (age 28)	Penafiel	2026		13	0
16	Edgar Grigoryan	(Armenia)	DF	25 August 1998 (age 28)	Unattached	2023		127	0
43	Bruno Wilson (Note: Bruno Wilson was born in Lisbon, Portugal but qualified to represent Mozambique, making his debut in September 2026.)	(Mozambique)	DF	27 December 1996 (age 29)	Unattached	2026		18	2
47	Alexandros Malis	(Greece)	DF	19 March 1997 (age 29)	AEK Athens B	2025		36	1
Midfielders
6	Michel Ayvazyan	(Armenia)	MF	21 June 2005 (age 21)	Academy	2022		22	1
8	Juan Balanta	(Colombia)	MF	3 March 1997 (age 29)	SCU Torreense	2025		41	7
10	Armen Ambartsumyan	(Russia)	MF	11 April 1994 (age 32)	Fakel Voronezh	2018		259	17
11	Zidane Banjaqui (Note: Zidane Banjaqui was born in Portugal, but qualified to represent Guinea-Bissau, making his debut in June 2020.)	(Guinea-Bissau)	MF	15 December 1998 (age 27)	Panserraikos	2026		34	5
17	Maxence Carlier	(France)	MF	15 March 1997 (age 29)	Nancy	2026		20	1
19	Karen Muradyan	(Armenia)	MF	11 November 1992 (age 33)	Ararat Yerevan	2021		196	2
20	Alwyn Tera	(Kenya)	MF	18 January 1997 (age 29)	Saburtalo Tbilisi	2021		182	9
23	Martun Hovhannisyan	(Armenia)	MF	1 October 2008 (age 18)	Academy	2026		1	0
36	Vahram Makhsudyan	(Armenia)	MF	22 January 2003 (age 23)	Academy	2024	2028	4	0
70	Benny	(Portugal)	MF	4 January 1997 (age 29)	Unattached	2026		17	2
95	França	(Brazil)	MF	9 February 1995 (age 31)	Persijap Jepara	2026		25	6
Forwards
7	Zhirayr Shaghoyan	(Armenia)	FW	10 April 2001 (age 25)	Academy	2017		156	26
9	Arayik Eloyan	(Armenia)	FW	16 March 2004 (age 22)	Academy	2022	2028	41	12
25	Alioune Ndour	(Senegal)	FW	21 October 1997 (age 29)	Zulte Waregem	2026	2028	29	10
77	Artur Serobyan	(Armenia)	FW	2 July 2003 (age 23)	Academy	2020		123	28
90	Paul Ayongo	(Ghana)	FW	16 November 1996 (age 29)	Chaves	2025		36	5
91	Sandro Lima	(Brazil)	FW	28 October 1990 (age 36)	Alverca	2026		20	7
Away on loan
Left during the season
22	Misak Hakobyan	(Armenia)	FW	11 June 2004 (age 22)	Academy	2021	2028	5	0
28	Davit Barseghyan	(Armenia)	MF	3 January 2005 (age 21)	Unattached	2024		0	0
99	João Lima	(Brazil)	MF	11 May 2000 (age 26)	Santa Clara	2025		11	1

== Transfers ==
=== In ===
Date	Position	Nationality	Name	From	Fee	Ref.
20 June 2026	DF	(Brazil)	Luis Felipe	Ethnikos Achna	Undisclosed	
25 June 2026	MF	(Brazil)	França	Persijap Jepara	Undisclosed	
27 June 2026	DF	(Portugal)	Bruno Pereira	Penafiel	Undisclosed	
2 July 2026	GK	(Brazil)	João Bravim	Santa Clara	Undisclosed	
2 July 2026	DF	(Mozambique)	Bruno Wilson	Unattached	Free	
2 July 2026	FW	(Brazil)	Sandro Lima	Alverca	Undisclosed	
5 July 2026	MF	(France)	Maxence Carlier	Nancy	Undisclosed	
3 August 2026	MF	(Portugal)	Benny	Unattached	Free	
9 August 2026	GK	(Armenia)	Andranik Martirosyan	Ararat Yerevan	Undisclosed	

=== Out ===
Date	Position	Nationality	Name	To	Fee	Ref.
6 July 2026	MF	(Armenia)	Narek Alaverdyan	Ararat Yerevan	Undisclosed	
8 July 2026	MF	(Armenia)	Davit Barseghyan	Syunik	Undisclosed	
11 July 2026	MF	(Brazil)	João Lima	Tondela	Undisclosed	
7 August 2026	FW	(Armenia)	Misak Hakobyan	Sardarapat	Undisclosed	
1 February 2027	FW	(Armenia)	Artur Serobyan	Lechia Gdańsk	Undisclosed	

=== Released ===
Date	Position	Nationality	Name	Joined	Date	Ref
9 June 2026	DF	(Armenia)	Hakob Hakobyan	Alashkert	9 June 2026	
15 June 2026	DF	(Portugal)	João Queirós	Feirense	6 October 2026	
15 June 2026	MF	(Brazil)	Welton	Dinamo Tbilisi	8 August 2026	
30 June 2026	GK	(Portugal)	Bruno Pinto	Leça	7 July 2026	

== Friendlies ==
20 June 2026	Ararat-Armenia	1–1	NŠ Mura	Heiligenkreuz im Lafnitztal
19:30 (UTC+4)	Oliveira 36'	Report	Čakš 81'	Stadium: Waldstadion Heiligenkreuz

24 June 2026	Mattersburg	0–4	Ararat-Armenia	Hungary
(UTC+4)		Report	Hovhannisyan; Ndour; Makhsudyan

27 June 2026	Ararat-Armenia	1–1	Vojvodina	Bad Tatzmannsdorf
13:00 (UTC+4)	Serobyan 48'	Report	Mladenović 90+3'	Stadium: Sportplatz Bad Tatzmannsdorf

3 October 2026	Ararat Yerevan	0–4	Ararat-Armenia	Yerevan
(UTC+4)		Report	Banjaqui 15'; Hambardzumyan 23'; Felipe 34'; Ndour 47'

== Competitions ==
=== Overview ===
Competition	First match	Last match	Starting round	Final position	Record							
Competition	First match	Last match	Starting round	Final position	Pld	W	D	L	GF	GA	GD	Win %
Premier League	1 August 2026		Matchday 1		12	9	2	1	24	10	+14	75.00
Armenian Cup	29 October 2026		Quarter-final		1	1	0	0	4	1	+3	100.00
Armenian Supercup	2026		Final		0	0	0	0	0	0	+0	—
UEFA Champions League	7 July 2026	11 August 2026	First qualifying round	Third qualifying round	6	3	0	3	9	8	+1	50.00
UEFA Europa League	20 August 2026		Play-off round		6	1	1	4	6	15	−9	16.67
Total					25	14	3	8	43	34	+9	56.00

Last updated: 6 November 2026
Source: Competitions

=== Armenian Supercup ===
	–
(UTC+4)

=== Premier League ===
==== Results summary ====
Overall								Home						Away					
Pld	W	D	L	GF	GA	GD	Pts	W	D	L	GF	GA	GD	W	D	L	GF	GA	GD
12	9	2	1	23	9	+14	29	5	2	0	13	3	+10	4	0	1	10	6	+4

Last updated: 1 November 2026.
Source: See Results

==== Results by round ====
Round	1	2	3	4	5	6	7	8	9	10	11	12
Ground	A	H	H	H	A	A	H	A	H	A	H	H
Result	W	W	W	D	L	W	W	W	D	W	W	W
Position	4	4	2	2	5	3	3	2	3	2	2	2

Updated to match(es) played on 1 November 2026. Source: See Results
A = Away; H = Home; W = Win; D = Draw; L = Loss; P = Bye

==== Results ====
1 August 2026 1	Gandzasar Kapan	3–4	Ararat-Armenia	Yerevan
20:00 (UTC+4)	Titkov 39'; Avanesyan 58' (pen.) (yellow card) 90+4'; Grigoryan (yellow card) 86'; Adriano 88'	Report	Kanda 3' (o.g.); Eloyan 30'; Ayongo (yellow card) 32'; Bueno 49'; Muradyan (yellow card) 55'; Felipe (yellow card) 73'; Ndour 83'; França (yellow card) 90+4'	Stadium: Junior Sport Stadium; Referee: Ashot Ghaltakhchyan

7 August 2026 2	Ararat-Armenia	2–1	Urartu	Abovyan
19:00 (UTC+4)	Ndour 22'; França (yellow card) 33'; Benny 81'; Felipe (yellow card) 88'	Report	Rajani 31'; Piloyan (yellow card) 70'; Velosa (yellow card) 90'	Stadium: Vahagn Tumasyan Stadium; Referee: Zaven Hovhannisyan

15 August 2026 3	Ararat-Armenia	2–0	Van	Abovyan
16:00 (UTC+4)	Ndour 47'; Ayongo (yellow card) 80'; Wilson (yellow card) 88'; Eloyan 89'	Report	Gevorgyan (yellow card) 26'; Lueeendo (yellow card) 37'; Mensah (yellow card) 51'; Torres (yellow card) 74'; Obinna (yellow card) 77'	Stadium: Vahagn Tumasyan Stadium; Referee: Henrik Nalbandian

23 August 2026 4	Ararat-Armenia	1–1	Sardarapat	Abovyan
21:00 (UTC+4)	Shaghoyan 6'; Carlier (yellow card) 11'; Pereira (yellow card) 74'	Report	Petrosyan 22'; Quiñónez (yellow card) 53'	Stadium: Vahagn Tumasyan Stadium; Referee: Zaven Hovhannisyan

31 August 2026 5	Pyunik	2–1	Ararat-Armenia	Yerevan
20:00 (UTC+4)	Kulikov 16'; Tarakhchyan 32'; Kovalenko (yellow card) 77'; Islamović (yellow card) 77'	Report	Bueno (yellow card) 56'; França 67'; Pereira (yellow card) 88'	Stadium: Academy Stadium; Referee: Vardan Manukyan

5 September 2026 6	Ararat Yerevan	0–1	Ararat-Armenia	Yerevan
19:00 (UTC+4)	Haroyan (yellow card) 36'; Chukwu (yellow card) 63'	Report	Benny (yellow card) 43'; Lima 47'; Shaghoyan (yellow card) 86'; Ambartsumyan (yellow card) 90+6'	Stadium: Republican Stadium; Referee: Tiran Yeritsyan

11 September 2026 7	Ararat-Armenia	3–0	Syunik	Abovyan
19:00 (UTC+4)	França 18'; Ambartsumyan (yellow card) 42'; Bueno (yellow card) 53'; Eloyan 61', 73'; Tera (yellow card) 70'	Report	Hayrapetyan (yellow card) 31'; Barseghyan (yellow card) 35'; Litveacov (yellow card) 59'; Brito (yellow card) 60'	Stadium: Vahagn Tumasyan Stadium; Referee: Vardan Manukyan

20 September 2026 8	Shirak	1–3	Ararat-Armenia	Gyumri
18:00 (UTC+4)	Misakyan (yellow card) 2'; Janoyan (yellow card) 53' (goal) 73'	Report	Mnatsakanyan 18' (o.g.); Bueno 24'; França 33'; Balanta (yellow card) 41'; Benny (yellow card) 51'	Stadium: City Stadium; Referee: Artem Gasparyan

10 October 2026 9	Ararat-Armenia	1–1	Alashkert	Abovyan
19:00 (UTC+4)	Banjaqui (yellow card) 10'; Serobyan 27' (yellow card) 58'; Lima (yellow card) 90'	Report	Terteryan (yellow card) 6'; Massoumou 33'; Cézar (yellow card) 47'; Piloyan (yellow card) 50'; Sadoyan (yellow card) 90'	Stadium: Vahagn Tumasyan Stadium; Referee: Zaven Hovhannisyan

18 October 2026 10	BKMA Yerevan	0–1	Ararat-Armenia	Yerevan
17:00 (UTC+4)	Ars.Petrosyan (yellow card) 50'; Hovakimyan (yellow card) 90'; Movsesyan (yellow card) 90+2'	Report	Eloyan 10'; Ambartsumyan (yellow card) 14'; Muradyan (yellow card) 26'; Ndour (red card) 90+2'	Stadium: Academy Stadium; Referee: Vardan Manukyan

26 October 2026 11	Ararat-Armenia	2–1	Noah	Abovyan
19:00 (UTC+4)	Lima 9'; Shaghoyan 22'; Wilson (yellow card) 57'; França (yellow card) 90+6'	Report	Khamoyan (yellow card) 40'; Boakye (yellow card) 47'; Sualehe (yellow card) 54'; Hambardzumyan (yellow card) 60'; Saintini (yellow card) 70' (red card) 90'; Lazetić 80'	Stadium: Vahagn Tumasyan Stadium; Referee: Henrik Nalbandian

1 November 2026 12	Ararat-Armenia	3–0	Gandzasar	Abovyan
15:30 (UTC+4)	Serobyan 9'; Lima 28'; Mikhaelyan 75' (o.g.)	Report	Reis (yellow card) 52'; Khachatryan (yellow card) 90'	Stadium: Vahagn Tumasyan Stadium; Referee: Yura Mahtesyan

13	Urartu	–	Ararat-Armenia
(UTC+4)

20 November 2026 14	Van	–	Ararat-Armenia	Charentsavan
15:00 (UTC+4)		Report		Stadium: City Stadium

==== League table ====
Pos	Team	Pld	W	D	L	GF	GA	GD	Pts	Qualification or relegation
1	Noah	12	10	1	1	31	10	+21	31	Qualification for the Champions League first qualifying round
2	Ararat-Armenia	12	9	2	1	24	10	+14	29	Qualification for the Conference League second qualifying round
3	Pyunik	12	8	4	0	28	9	+19	28	Qualification for the Conference League first qualifying round
4	Alashkert	12	7	4	1	27	8	+19	25	
5	Sardarapat	12	4	5	3	19	20	−1	17	
6	Urartu	12	4	4	4	19	15	+4	16	
7	Shirak	12	4	2	6	14	15	−1	14	
8	Van	12	3	2	7	12	29	−17	11	
9	Ararat Yerevan	12	3	2	7	10	20	−10	11	
10	Syunik	12	2	2	8	11	26	−15	8	
11	BKMA	12	2	2	8	10	22	−12	8	
12	Gandzasar Kapan	12	1	0	11	9	30	−21	3	Relegation to the Armenian First League

Updated to match(es) played on 1 November 2026. Source: FFA
Rules for classification: 1) Points; 2) Head-to-head points; 3) Head-to-head goal difference; 4) Head-to-head goals scored; 5) Matches won; 6) Goal difference; 7) Less red cards; 8) Less yellow cards ; 9) Fair-play ranking 10) Draw

=== Armenian Cup ===
29 October 2026 Round of 16	Olympia Yerevan	1–4 (a.e.t.)	Ararat-Armenia	Ashtarak
15:30 (UTC+4)	Tamura (yellow card) 15'; Gabriel 30'; Asatryan (yellow card) 39'; H.Aleksanyan (yellow card) 67'; Bonilla (yellow card) 84'; Guilherme (yellow card) 105+2' (yellow-red card) 105+2'	Report	Ndour 15' (pen.) (penalty missed) 72'; Eloyan (yellow card) 98'; França (yellow card) 102' (goal) 119'; Benny 105+2'; Muradyan (yellow card) 107'; Grigoryan (yellow card) 110'; Carlier 115'	Stadium: Kasakhi Marzik Stadium; Referee: Narek Hayrapetyan

	–
(UTC+4)

=== UEFA Champions League ===
==== Qualifying rounds ====
7 July 2026 First qualifying round 1st leg	Ararat-Armenia	2–0	(Latvia) Riga	Abovyan, Armenia
20:00 (UTC+4)	Oliveira 63'; França 86'	Report	Badamosi (yellow card) 54'; Oulad M'Hand (yellow card) 68'; Orols (red card) 72'	Stadium: Abovyan City Stadium; Attendance: 2,300; Referee: Klym Zabroda (Ukraine)
Note: Ararat-Armenia played their home matches at Abovyan City Stadium in Abovyan instead of their regular stadium, Yerevan Football Academy Stadium

14 July 2026 First qualifying round 2nd leg	Riga (Latvia)	3–2 (3–4 agg.)	Ararat-Armenia	Riga, Latvia
21:00 (UTC+4)	Siqueira 14'; Ankrah 23', (yellow card) 66'; Oulad M'Hand (yellow card) 41'; Galo (yellow card) 44'; Salazar (yellow card) 66'; Reginaldo (yellow card) 72', (goal) 90+4' (pen.)	Report	Grigoryan (yellow card) 34'; Shaghoyan 46'; Lima 63'; Banjaqui (yellow card) 66'; Oliveira (yellow card) 70'; França (yellow card) 85'	Stadium: Skonto Stadium; Attendance: 4,801; Referee: Bence Csonka (Hungary)

21 July 2026 Second qualifying round 1st leg	Ararat-Armenia	2–0	(Republic of Ireland) Shamrock Rovers	Yerevan, Armenia
20:00 (UTC+4)	Lima 51'; Banjaqui 80', (yellow card) 90+5'; Bueno (yellow card) 89'	Report	Grace (yellow card) 40'; Healy (yellow card) 81'; Afolabi (yellow card) 89'	Stadium: Vazgen Sargsyan Republican Stadium; Attendance: 3,900; Referee: David Dickinson (Scotland)
Note: Ararat-Armenia played their second qualifying round home leg at the Vazgen Sargsyan Republican Stadium in Yerevan, instead of their regular home ground, Yerevan Football Academy Stadium in Yerevan.

28 July 2026 Second qualifying round 2nd leg	Shamrock Rovers (Republic of Ireland)	2–1 (2–3 agg.)	Ararat-Armenia	Dublin, Ireland
23:00 (UTC+4)	Healy 11'; Greene 36'; Lopes (yellow card) 58'	Report	Bueno (yellow card) 50'; Lima 73'; Wilson (yellow card) 81'; França (yellow card) 82'	Stadium: Tallaght Stadium; Attendance: 6,731; Referee: Sam Barrott (England)

4 August 2026 Third qualifying round 1st leg	Ararat-Armenia	2–1	(Slovenia) Celje	Yerevan, Armenia
20:00 (UTC+4)	Serobyan 38'; França 70'	Report	Sešlar 22' (pen.); Kvesić (yellow card) 58'; Daniel (yellow card) 90+5'	Stadium: Vazgen Sargsyan Republican Stadium; Attendance: 8,110; Referee: Ivan Kružliak (Slovakia)
Note: Ararat-Armenia played their second qualifying round home leg at the Vazgen Sargsyan Republican Stadium in Yerevan, instead of their regular home ground, Yerevan Football Academy Stadium in Yerevan.

11 August 2026 Second qualifying round 2nd leg	Celje (Slovenia)	2–0 (3–2 agg.)	Ararat-Armenia	Celje, Slovenia
22:15 (UTC+4)	Koutris (yellow card) 32'; Tutyškinas (yellow card) 64'; Avdyli (yellow card) 66'; Zabukovnik (yellow card) 78'; Dukuly 83'; Verbič 85', (yellow card) 86'	Report	Tera (yellow card) 19'; Oliveira (yellow card) 19'; Banjaqui (yellow card) 84'	Stadium: Stadion Z'dežele; Attendance: 5,060; Referee: Marco Guida (Italy)

=== UEFA Europa League ===
==== Qualifying rounds ====
20 August 2026 Play-off round 1st leg	Universitatea Craiova (Romania)	1–1	Ararat-Armenia	Craiova, Romania
21:00 (UTC+4)	Bancu 33'; Matei (yellow card) 39'; Romanchuk (yellow card) 47'; Rus (yellow card) 69'; Etim (yellow card) 77'	Report	Malis 21'	Stadium: Ion Oblemenco Stadium; Attendance: 22,712; Referee: Nick Walsh (Scotland)

27 August 2026 Play-off round 2nd leg	Ararat-Armenia	1–0 (2–1 agg.)	(Romania) Universitatea Craiova	Yerevan, Armenia
20:00 (UTC+4)	Wilson (yellow card) 80'; Lima (penalty missed) 90+8', 90+8', (yellow card) 90+10'; Shaghoyan (yellow card) 90+9'	Report	Bancu (yellow card) 48'; Nsimba (yellow card) 90+3'; Teles (yellow card) 90+7'; Screciu (yellow card) 90+9'; Mora (red card) 90+11'	Stadium: Vazgen Sargsyan Republican Stadium; Attendance: 9,280; Referee: Donatas Rumšas (Lithuania)

==== League phase ====
Pos	Team	Pld	W	D	L	GF	GA	GD	Pts
32	(Scotland) Celtic	4	1	0	3	6	11	−5	3
33	(Israel) Hapoel Be'er Sheva	4	0	1	3	1	8	−7	1
34	(Norway) Lillestrøm	4	0	1	3	2	10	−8	1
35	(Poland) Lech Poznań	4	0	1	3	2	12	−10	1
36	Ararat-Armenia	4	0	0	4	4	14	−10	0

Updated to match(es) played on 5 November 2026. Source: UEFA
Rules for classification: League phase tiebreakers

16 September 2026 1	Ararat-Armenia	1–4	(Czech Republic) Sparta Prague	Yerevan, Armenia
20:45 (UTC+4)	Wilson 55'; Serobyan (yellow card) 57'; Grigoryan (yellow card) 88'; Muradyan (yellow card) 90+1'	Report	Guddal 20', 22'; Mercado 53'; Vydra 71'	Stadium: Republican Stadium; Referee: Mohammed Al-Hakim (Sweden)
Note: Ararat-Armenia will play their home matches at Vazgen Sargsyan Republican Stadium, Yerevan, instead of their regular stadium, Yerevan Football Academy Stadium, Yerevan, which does not meet UEFA requirements.

15 October 2026 2	Jagiellonia Białystok (Poland)	3–1	Ararat-Armenia	Białystok, Poland
23:00 (UTC+4)	Jóźwiak 13'; Romanczuk (yellow card) 20'; Conceição 38'; Sow 51'; Stojinović (yellow card) 83'; Kozłowski (yellow card) 84'	Report	Banjaqui 11'; Wilson (yellow card) 30'; Tera (yellow card) 57'	Stadium: Stadion Miejski; Attendance: 12,169; Referee: Anastasios Papapetrou (Greece)

22 October 2026 3	Ararat-Armenia	0–4	(Netherlands) AZ	Yerevan, Armenia
20:45 (UTC+4)	Wilson (yellow card) 23'; Ambartsumyan (yellow card) 44'	Report	Byskov 21'; Patati 27', 76'; Meerdink 79'	Stadium: Republican Stadium; Attendance: 6,254; Referee: Patrik Kolarić (Croatia)
Note: Ararat-Armenia will play their home matches at Vazgen Sargsyan Republican Stadium, Yerevan, instead of their regular stadium, Yerevan Football Academy Stadium, Yerevan, which does not meet UEFA requirements.

6 November 2026 4	Torreense (Portugal)	3–2	Ararat-Armenia	Leiria, Portugal
00:00 (UTC+4)	Aguirre 13' (red card) 25'; Volnei (yellow card) 45+2'; Drammeh (yellow card) 88' (goal) 90+5'; Rijo (yellow card) 88'; Vázquez 90+3'	Report	Muradyan 41' (yellow card) 45+2'; Wilson (yellow card) 43' (goal) 58'; Benny (yellow card) 48'; Bravim (red card) 76'; Nersesyan (yellow card) 79'; França (yellow card) 84'	Stadium: Estádio Dr. Magalhães Pessoa; Attendance: 1,679; Referee: Miloš Milanović (Serbia)
Note: Torreense will play their home matches at Estádio Dr. Magalhães Pessoa, Leiria, instead of their regular stadium, Estádio Manuel Marques, Torres Vedras, which does not meet UEFA requirements.

26 November 2026 5	Red Bull Salzburg (Austria)	v	Ararat-Armenia	Salzburg, Austria
21:45 (UTC+4)				Stadium: Red Bull Arena

10 December 2026 6	Ararat-Armenia	v	(Netherlands) NEC	Yerevan, Armenia
21:45 (UTC+4)				Stadium: Republican Stadium
Note: Ararat-Armenia will play their home matches at Vazgen Sargsyan Republican Stadium, Yerevan, instead of their regular stadium, Yerevan Football Academy Stadium, Yerevan, which does not meet UEFA requirements.

21 January 2027 7	Ararat-Armenia	v	(Slovenia) Celje	Yerevan, Armenia
21:45 (UTC+4)				Stadium: Republican Stadium
Note: Ararat-Armenia will play their home matches at Vazgen Sargsyan Republican Stadium, Yerevan, instead of their regular stadium, Yerevan Football Academy Stadium, Yerevan, which does not meet UEFA requirements.

29 January 2027 8	Milan (Italy)	v	Ararat-Armenia	Milan, Italy
00:00 (UTC+4)				Stadium: San Siro

== Squad statistics ==
As of match played 6 November 2026

=== Appearances and goals ===
No.	Pos	Nat	Player	Total		Premier League		Armenian Cup		Supercup		Champions League		Europa League	
No.	Pos	Nat	Player	Apps	Goals	Apps	Goals	Apps	Goals	Apps	Goals	Apps	Goals	Apps	Goals
1	GK	(Armenia) ARM	Arman Nersesyan	9	0	7	0	1	0	0	0	0	0	0+1	0
2	DF	(Portugal) POR	Hugo Oliveira	22	1	4+6	0	0	0	0	0	6	1	6	0
3	DF	(Armenia) ARM	Junior Bueno	16	2	5+2	2	0	0	0	0	6	0	3	0
5	DF	(Brazil) BRA	Luis Felipe	15	0	9+1	0	1	0	0	0	0+3	0	1	0
6	MF	(Armenia) ARM	Michel Ayvazyan	10	0	6+1	0	1	0	0	0	0+2	0	0	0
7	FW	(Armenia) ARM	Zhirayr Shaghoyan	23	2	8+4	1	0+1	0	0	0	3+1	1	2+4	0
8	MF	(Colombia) COL	Juan Balanta	16	0	7+2	0	0	0	0	0	0+1	0	3+3	0
9	FW	(Armenia) ARM	Arayik Eloyan	11	5	3+4	5	1	0	0	0	0	0	0+3	0
10	MF	(Russia) RUS	Armen Ambartsumyan	12	0	4+3	0	1	0	0	0	0+2	0	1+1	0
11	MF	(Guinea-Bissau) GBS	Zidane Banjaqui	18	2	2+5	0	0	0	0	0	3+3	1	4+1	1
13	DF	(Armenia) ARM	Kamo Hovhannisyan	7	0	0+2	0	0+1	0	0	0	3	0	0+1	0
14	DF	(Portugal) POR	Bruno Pereira	13	0	10	0	1	0	0	0	0+1	0	0+1	0
16	DF	(Armenia) ARM	Edgar Grigoryan	14	0	2	0	0+1	0	0	0	5	0	6	0
17	MF	(France) FRA	Maxence Carlier	20	1	7+3	0	1	1	0	0	2+2	0	2+3	0
19	MF	(Armenia) ARM	Karen Muradyan	22	1	5+4	0	0+1	0	0	0	6	0	4+2	1
20	MF	(Kenya) KEN	Alwyn Tera	15	0	4+3	0	0	0	0	0	4+1	0	1+2	0
23	MF	(Armenia) ARM	Martun Hovhannisyan	1	0	0	0	0+1	0	0	0	0	0	0	0
25	FW	(Senegal) SEN	Alioune Ndour	13	4	4+3	3	1	1	0	0	0+5	0	0	0
43	DF	(Mozambique) MOZ	Bruno Wilson	18	2	5+1	0	0	0	0	0	5+1	0	6	2
47	DF	(Greece) GRE	Alexandros Malis	15	1	6	0	0	0	0	0	4	0	5	1
70	MF	(Portugal) POR	Benny	17	2	6+3	1	1	1	0	0	0+1	0	4+2	0
77	FW	(Armenia) ARM	Artur Serobyan	22	3	5+5	2	0	0	0	0	6	1	6	0
90	FW	(Ghana) GHA	Paul Ayongo	10	0	5+2	0	1	0	0	0	0+2	0	0	0
91	FW	(Brazil) BRA	Sandro Lima	20	7	5+2	3	0+1	0	0	0	6	3	6	1
95	MF	(Brazil) BRA	França	25	6	8+4	3	1	1	0	0	0+6	2	0+6	0
98	GK	(Brazil) BRA	João Bravim	17	0	5	0	0	0	0	0	6	0	6	0
Players away on loan:
Players who left Ararat-Armenia during the season:

=== Goal scorers ===
Place	Position	Nation	Number	Name	Premier League	Armenian Cup	Supercup	Champions League	Europa League	Total
1	FW	(Brazil)	91	Sandro Lima	3	0	0	3	1	7
2	MF	(Brazil)	95	França	3	1	0	2	0	6
3	FW	(Armenia)	9	Arayik Eloyan	5	0	0	0	0	5
4	FW	(Senegal)	25	Alioune Ndour	3	1	0	0	0	4
5	FW	(Armenia)	77	Artur Serobyan	2	0	0	1	0	3
5				Own goal	3	0	0	0	0	3
7	DF	(Armenia)	3	Junior Bueno	2	0	0	0	0	2
7	MF	(Portugal)	70	Benny	1	1	0	0	0	2
7	FW	(Armenia)	7	Zhirayr Shaghoyan	1	0	0	1	0	2
7	MF	(Guinea-Bissau)	11	Zidane Banjaqui	0	0	0	1	1	2
7	DF	(Mozambique)	43	Bruno Wilson	0	0	0	0	2	2
12	DF	(Portugal)	2	Hugo Oliveira	0	0	0	1	0	1
12	DF	(Greece)	47	Alexandros Malis	0	0	0	0	1	1
12	MF	(Armenia)	19	Karen Muradyan	0	0	0	0	1	1
				TOTALS	24	4	0	9	6	43

=== Clean sheets ===
Place	Position	Nation	Number	Name	Premier League	Armenian Cup	Supercup	Champions League	Europa League	Total
1	GK	(Brazil)	98	João Bravim	3	0	0	2	1	6
2	GK	(Armenia)	1	Arman Nersesyan	2	0	0	0	0	2
				TOTALS	5	0	0	2	1	8

=== Disciplinary record ===
Number	Nation	Position	Name	Premier League		Armenian Cup		Supercup		Champions League		Europa League		Total	
Number	Nation	Position	Name	Yellow card	Red card	Yellow card	Red card	Yellow card	Red card	Yellow card	Red card	Yellow card	Red card	Yellow card	Red card
1	(Armenia)	GK	Arman Nersesyan	0	0	0	0	0	0	0	0	1	0	1	0
2	(Portugal)	DF	Hugo Oliveira	0	0	0	0	0	0	2	0	0	0	2	0
3	(Armenia)	DF	Junior Bueno	2	0	0	0	0	0	2	0	0	0	4	0
5	(Brazil)	DF	Luis Felipe	2	0	0	0	0	0	0	0	0	0	2	0
7	(Armenia)	FW	Zhirayr Shaghoyan	1	0	0	0	0	0	0	0	1	0	2	0
8	(Colombia)	MF	Juan Balanta	1	0	0	0	0	0	0	0	0	0	1	0
9	(Armenia)	FW	Arayik Eloyan	0	0	1	0	0	0	0	0	0	0	1	0
10	(Russia)	MF	Armen Ambartsumyan	3	0	0	0	0	0	0	0	1	0	4	0
11	(Guinea-Bissau)	MF	Zidane Banjaqui	1	0	0	0	0	0	3	0	0	0	4	0
14	(Portugal)	DF	Bruno Pereira	2	0	0	0	0	0	0	0	0	0	2	0
16	(Armenia)	DF	Edgar Grigoryan	0	0	1	0	0	0	1	0	1	0	3	0
17	(France)	MF	Maxence Carlier	1	0	0	0	0	0	0	0	0	0	1	0
19	(Armenia)	MF	Karen Muradyan	2	0	1	0	0	0	0	0	2	0	5	0
20	(Kenya)	MF	Alwyn Tera	1	0	0	0	0	0	1	0	1	0	3	0
25	(Senegal)	FW	Alioune Ndour	0	1	0	0	0	0	0	0	0	0	0	1
43	(Mozambique)	DF	Bruno Wilson	2	0	0	0	0	0	1	0	4	0	7	0
70	(Portugal)	MF	Benny	2	0	0	0	0	0	0	0	1	0	3	0
77	(Armenia)	FW	Artur Serobyan	1	0	0	0	0	0	0	0	1	0	2	0
90	(Ghana)	FW	Paul Ayongo	2	0	0	0	0	0	0	0	0	0	2	0
91	(Brazil)	FW	Sandro Lima	1	0	0	0	0	0	0	0	1	0	2	0
95	(Brazil)	MF	França	3	0	1	0	0	0	2	0	1	0	7	0
98	(Brazil)	GK	João Bravim	0	0	0	0	0	0	0	0	0	1	0	1
Players away on loan:
Players who left Ararat-Armenia during the season:
			TOTALS	27	1	4	0	0	0	12	0	15	1	58	2
