= 2023–24 Armenian First League =

Armenian First League
- Season: 2023-24
- Dates: 1 August 2023 – 27 May 2024
- Champions: Gandzasar
- Promoted: Gandzasar
- Matches played: 210
- Goals scored: 723 (3.44 per match)
- Top goalscorer: Saleh Nasr (32 goals)

The 2023-24 Armenian First League season was the 32nd since its establishment. The season began 1 August 2023 and finished 27 May 2024.

== Stadiums and locations ==
Locations of the 2023-24 Armenian First League teams

Club	Location	Stadium	Capacity
Alashkert-2	Yerevan (Shengavit)	Alashkert Stadium	6,850
Ararat-Armenia-2	Yerevan	Yerevan Football Academy	1,428
Andranik	Yerevan (Shengavit)	Sevan Stadium	500
Ararat-Yerevan-2	Yerevan	Dzoraghbyur Training Centre	300
BKMA Yerevan-2	Yerevan	Vagharshapat Football Academy	300
Gandzasar	Kapan	Gandzasar Stadium	3500
Lernayin Artsakh-2	Sisian	Sisian City Stadium	500
Mika	Yerevan	The Mika Stadium	7,250
Nikarm	Vanadzor	Vanadzor Academy Stadium	5,000
Noah-2	Yerevan	Abovyan City Stadium	3,946
Onor	Yerevan	Kasakhi Marzik Stadium	3,600
Pyunik Academy	Yerevan	Pyunik Stadium	780
Shirak-2	Gyumri	Gyumri City Stadium	2,844
Syunik	Kapan	Gandzasar Stadium	3500
Urartu-2	Yerevan	Urartu Training Centre	500

== League table ==
Pos	Team	Pld	W	D	L	GF	GA	GD	Pts	Promotion
1	Gandzasar	28	24	2	2	69	17	+52	74	Promotion to the Armenian Premier League
2	Syunik	28	20	3	5	62	24	+38	63	
3	BKMA Yerevan-2	28	20	3	5	81	31	+50	63	
4	Lernayin Artsakh	28	18	4	6	62	27	+35	58	
5	Urartu-2	28	10	12	6	51	34	+17	42	
6	Andranik	28	12	5	11	41	45	−4	41	
7	Noah-2	28	11	6	11	53	38	+15	39	
8	Ararat-Armenia-2	28	11	6	11	48	41	+7	39	
9	Alashkert-2	28	10	7	11	46	49	−3	37	
10	Shirak-2	28	10	3	15	41	50	−9	33	
11	Ararat Yerevan-2	28	9	5	14	52	47	+5	32	
12	Pyunik Academy	28	9	3	16	50	57	−7	30	
13	Mika	28	4	5	19	21	60	−39	17	
14	Onor	28	4	4	20	23	85	−62	16	
15	Nikarm	28	4	0	24	27	122	−95	12	

Updated to match(es) played on 27 May 2025. Source:
Rules for classification: 1) Points; 2) Play-off (only if deciding champion); 3) Matches won; 4) Head-to-head points; 5) Head-to-head matches won; 6) Head-to-head goal difference; 7) Head-to-head goals scored; 8) Head-to-head away goals scored; 9) Goal difference; 10) Goals scored.

== Statistics ==
=== Top scorers ===
As of match played 27 May 2024

Rank	Player	Club	Goals
1	(Egypt) Saleh Nasr	Gandzasar Kapan	32
2	(Armenia) Levon Petrosyan	Pyunik Academy	18
3	(Armenia) Akhmed Jindoyan	Alashkert-2	15
4	(Armenia) Hamlet Minasyan	Syunik	14
5	(Armenia) Grigor Hovhannisyan	Noah-2	13
6	(Japan) Taiga Kitajima	Lernayin Artsakh-2	12
7	(Armenia) Vyacheslav Afyan	Pyunik Academy	11
7	(Armenia) David Ghiasyan	Urartu-2	11
9	(Armenia) Davit Hakobyan	BKMA Yerevan-2	10
9	(Nigeria) Oluebube Miracle Onuoha	West Armenia	10
