= 2026–27 Armenian Premier League =

Armenian Premier League
- Season: 2026–27
- Dates: 31 July 2026 – 2027
- Matches: 48
- Goals: 15 (0.31 per match)
- Top goalscorer: Hélder Ferreira (7)
- Biggest home win: Noah 4-0 Ararat Yerevan (30 August 2026); Alashkert 4-0 Van (3 September 2026)
- Biggest away win: Van 0-4 Shirak (29 August 2026)
- Highest scoring: Gandzasar 3-4 Ararat-Armenia (2 August 2026); Shirak 3-4 Noah (9 August 2026)
- All statistics correct as of 20 September 2026.

The 2026–27 Armenian Premier League, known as the Armenian Fastex Premier League (Armenian: Հայաստանի Պրեմիեր Լիգա) for sponsorship reasons, is the 35th season of the league since its establishment.

== Season events ==
On 8 June, the Football Federation of Armenia voted to expanded the league from 10 teams to 12 teams, meaning Shirak were spared relegation.

== Teams ==
Locations of the teams

Club	Location	Stadium	Capacity
Alashkert	Abovyan	Abovyan City Stadium	3,100
Ararat Yerevan	Yerevan (Kentron)	Vazgen Sargsyan Republican Stadium	14,403
Ararat-Armenia	Yerevan (Avan)	Yerevan Football Academy Stadium^{1}	1,428
BKMA	Yerevan (Avan)	Yerevan Football Academy Stadium^{1}	1,428
Gandzasar	Yerevan (Shengavit)	Junior Sport Stadium^{1}	1,000
Noah	Abovyan	Abovyan City Stadium^{1}	3,100
Pyunik	Yerevan (Shengavit)	Junior Sport Stadium	1,000
Sardarapat	Armavir	Hakob Tonoyan Stadium	3,120
Shirak	Gyumri	Gyumri City Stadium	4,000
Syunik	Sisian	Sisian City Stadium	1,000
Urartu	Yerevan (Malatia-Sebastia)	Urartu Stadium	4,860
Van	Charentsavan	Charentsavan City Stadium	5,000

=== Personnel and sponsorship ===
Team	Manager	Captain	Kit manufacturer	Shirt sponsor
Alashkert	(Armenia) Vahe Gevorgyan	(Armenia) Karen Nalbandyan	(Russia) Jogël	–
Ararat Yerevan	(Armenia) Karen Barseghyan	(Armenia) Artur Grigoryan	(Armenia) Melante	AWI International | Ohanyan
Ararat-Armenia	(Portugal) Tulipa	(Armenia) Armen Ambartsumyan	(Italy) Macron	Tashir Group
BKMA	(Armenia) Armen Gyulbudaghyants	(Armenia) Argishti Petrosyan	(Italy) Macron	–
Gandzasar	(Armenia) Armen Adamyan	(Armenia) Artem Avanesyan	(Armenia) Melante	–
Noah	(Uruguay) Pablo García	(Armenia) Hovhannes Hambardzumyan	(Germany) Adidas	Takar | imaginelive/Go.FM
Pyunik	(Russia) Dmitri Gunko	(Armenia) Edgar Malakyan	(Russia) Jogël	–
Sardarapat	(France) Alexandre Torres	(Armenia) Armen Sargsyan	(Armenia) Melante	–
Shirak	(Armenia) Arsen Hovhannisyan	(Armenia) Rafik Misakyan	(Armenia) Melante	–
Syunik	(Moldova) Igor Picușceac	(Armenia) Alen Karapetyan	(Spain) Joma	ZCMC
Urartu	(Lebanon) Hayk Milkon	(Armenia) Zhirayr Margaryan	(Armenia) Melante	-
Van	(Armenia) Armen Sanamyan	(Armenia) Petros Avetisyan	(Spain) Joma	AquaArma

=== Managerial changes ===
Team	Outgoing manager	Manner of departure	Date of vacancy	Position in table	Incoming manager	Date of appointment	Ref.
Ararat Yerevan	(Portugal) Ricardo Dionísio	Contract Expired	25 June 2026	Pre-season	(Armenia) Karen Barseghyan	27 June 2026	
Gandzasar	(Armenia) Karen Barseghyan	Contract Expired		Pre-season	(Armenia) Karen Avoyan		
Syunik	(Armenia) Ashot Manucharyan			Pre-season	(Moldova) Igor Picușceac	1 July 2026	
Van	(Armenia) Arthur Asoyan			Pre-season	(Belarus) Aleksandr Mikhailov	28 June 2026	
Noah	(Croatia) Sandro Perković		19 August 2026	1st	(Uruguay) Pablo García	20 August 2026	
Van	(Belarus) Aleksandr Mikhailov	Mutual Termination	3 September 2026	12th	(Armenia) Samvel Sargsyan (Interim)	3 September 2026	
Pyunik	(Armenia) Artak Oseyan	Mutual Termination	7 September 2026	4th	(Armenia) Aram Gyulbudaghyants (Interim)	7 September 2026	
Van	(Armenia) Samvel Sargsyan (Interim)	End of role	10 September 2026	12th	(Armenia) Armen Sanamyan	10 September 2026	
Gandzasar	(Armenia) Karen Avoyan		18 September 2026	11th	(Armenia) Armen Adamyan	29 September 2026	
Pyunik	(Armenia) Aram Gyulbudaghyants (Interim)	End of role	1 October 2026	3rd	(Russia) Dmitri Gunko	1 October 2026	
Urartu	(Armenia) Robert Arzumanyan	Mutual termination	28 October 2026	5th	(Spain) Francisco Compan (Interim)	28 October 2026	
Urartu	(Spain) Francisco Compan (Interim)	End of role	3 November 2026	6th	(Lebanon) Hayk Milkon	3 November 2026	

== League table ==
Pos	Team	Pld	W	D	L	GF	GA	GD	Pts	Qualification or relegation
1	Noah	14	12	1	1	33	10	+23	37	Qualification for the Champions League first qualifying round
2	Pyunik	14	9	5	0	33	11	+22	32	Qualification for the Conference League second qualifying round
3	Ararat-Armenia	13	10	2	1	26	11	+15	32	Qualification for the Conference League first qualifying round
4	Alashkert	14	7	4	3	28	13	+15	25	
5	Sardarapat	14	5	6	3	22	22	0	21	
6	Urartu	13	5	4	4	21	16	+5	19	
7	Shirak	14	5	2	7	17	16	+1	17	
8	Ararat Yerevan	14	3	3	8	11	22	−11	12	
9	BKMA	14	3	3	8	15	24	−9	12	
10	Syunik	14	3	2	9	14	29	−15	11	
11	Van	14	3	2	9	13	34	−21	11	
12	Gandzasar Kapan	14	1	0	13	10	35	−25	3	Relegation to the Armenian First League

Updated to match(es) played on 22 November 2026. Source: FFA
Rules for classification: 1) Points; 2) Head-to-head points; 3) Head-to-head goal difference; 4) Head-to-head goals scored; 5) Matches won; 6) Goal difference; 7) Less red cards; 8) Less yellow cards ; 9) Fair-play ranking 10) Draw

== Fixtures and results ==
=== Results table ===
Home \ Away	ALA	ARA	AAR	BKM	GAK	NOA	PYU	SAR	SHI	SYN	URA	VAN
Alashkert		3–0		3–0	3–0	0–1	3–3			5–1	5 Dec	4–0
Ararat Yerevan	0–2		0–1	1–1		6 Dec	0–2	1–2	1–1	1–0		
Ararat-Armenia	1–1	14 Dec			3–0	2–1	5 Dec	1–1		3–0	2–1	2–0
BKMA	4–1	1–2	0–1		4 Dec	0–1		1–1	0–0		2–1	
Gandzasar	30 Nov	0–2	3–4	0–3		13 Dec		1–2	0–1	3–1	0–3	
Noah	1–0	4–0		28 Nov	3–2		1–1		1–0	3–0		2–0
Pyunik		29 Nov	2–1	5–0	3–0			2–2	2–0	13 Dec	1–0	3–0
Sardarapat	1–1	1–0	30 Nov			1–5	2–4		12 Dec	3–1	0–0	2–2
Shirak	0–1		1–3	2–1	3–0	3–4		2–0			0–1	6 Dec
Syunik				4–1	2–1	1–3	0–0	4 Dec	2–0		1–2	29 Nov
Urartu	1–1	2–2	ppd	12 Dec		0–3	2–2		28 Nov	3–0		5–2
Van	14 Dec	2–1	1–2	2–1	2–0		0–3	1–4	0–4	1–1		

Updated to match(es) played on 22 November 2026. Source: Soccerway
Legend: Blue = home team win; Yellow = draw; Red = away team win.

== Season statistics ==
=== Top scorers ===
As of match played 26 October 2026

Rank	Player	Club	Goals
1	(Congolese Football Federation) Domi Massoumou	Alashkert	8
2	(Portuguese Football Federation) Hélder Ferreira	Noah	7
2	(Cyprus Football Association) Iasonas Pikis	Pyunik	7
2	(Football Association of Serbia) Marko Lazetić	Noah	7
2	(Football Federation of Armenia) Miguel Rajani	Urartu	7
6	(Football Federation of Armenia) Levon Petrosyan	Sardarapat	6
6	(Football Federation of Armenia) Karen Nalbandyan	Alashkert	6
8	(Football Federation of Armenia) Gevorg Tarakhchyan	Pyunik	5
8	(Russian Football Union) Daniil Kulikov	Pyunik	5
8	(Football Federation of Armenia) Arayik Eloyan	Ararat-Armenia	5

=== Clean sheets ===
As of match played 26 October 2026

Rank	Player	Club	Clean sheets
1	(Football Federation of Armenia) Arsen Beglaryan	Alashkert	5
2	(Football Federation of Armenia) Lyova Karapetyan	Shirak	4
2	(Portuguese Football Federation) Dani Figueira	Noah	4
2	(Football Federation of Armenia) Aleksandr Mishiyev	Urartu	4
5	(Football Federation of Armenia) Henri Avagyan	Pyunik	3
5	(Football Federation of Armenia) Stanislav Buchnev	Pyunik	3
7	(Football Federation of Armenia) Hayk Ghazaryan	BKMA Yerevan	2
7	(Football Federation of Armenia) Arman Nersesyan	Ararat-Armenia	2
7	(Brazilian Football Confederation) Arthur Coneglian	Noah	2
7	(Portuguese Football Federation) Diogo Sá	Syunik	2
7	(Brazilian Football Confederation) João Bravim	Ararat-Armenia	2
12	(Comoros Football Federation) Adel Anzimati	Ararat Yerevan	1
12	(Russian Football Union) Nikita Lobusov	Ararat Yerevan	1
12	(Russian Football Union) Danila Bokov	Van	1
12	(Football Federation of Armenia) Gor Matinyan	Sardarapat	1
