= Yevhen Tsymbalyuk =

Ukrainian footballer

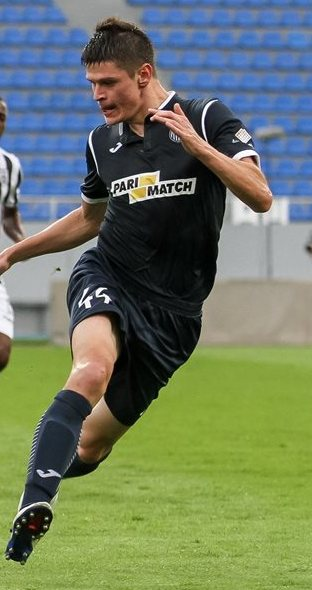
- Tsymbalyuk with Olimpik Donetsk in 2017

Personal information
- Full name: Yevhen Serhiyovych Tsymbalyuk
- Date of birth: 19 June 1996 (age 30)
- Place of birth: Krasnyi Lyman, Ukraine
- Height: 1.83 m (6 ft 0 in)
- Position: Defender

Team information
- Current team: Urartu
- Number: 44

Youth career
- 2009–2016: Olimpik Donetsk

Senior career*
Years	Team	Apps	(Gls)
2015–2021	Olimpik Donetsk	86	(1)
2021–2022	Desna Chernihiv	15	(0)
2022–2024	Urartu	44	(4)
2024–2025	Concordia Chiajna	18	(0)
2025–	Urartu	26	(0)

International career
2018	Ukraine U21	1	(0)
- * Club domestic league appearances and goals as of 10 November 2026

Yevhen Serhiyovych Tsymbalyuk (Ukrainian: Євген Сергійович Цимбалюк; born 19 June 1996) is a Ukrainian professional footballer who plays as a defender for Armenian Premier League club Urartu.

== Career ==
=== Olimpik Donetsk ===
Tsymbalyuk is a product of the Olimpik Donetsk youth system. He made his debut for Olimpik Donetsk against FC Illichivets Mariupol on 30 May 2015 in the Ukrainian Premier League. He went on to help the side qualify for the semi-final of the 2014–15 Ukrainian Cup and the 2017–18 Europa League third qualifying round. On 24 November 2019 he scored against Karpaty Lviv.

=== Desna Chernihiv ===
On 16 July 2021 he signed a two-year contract with Desna Chernihiv of the Ukrainian Premier League. After the 2022 Russian invasion of Ukraine, however, his contract was cancelled.

=== Urartu ===
On 14 September 2022, he moved to Urartu in Armenian Premier League. On 30 October he scored his first goal against Lernayin Artsakh.

=== Concordia Chiajnɑ ===
In summer 2024 he moved to Concordia Chiajna in Liga II.

=== Urartu ===
On 20 June 2025, he moved back again to Urartu in Armenian Premier League.

== International career ==
On 27 March 2018 he appeared for the Ukraine under-21 squad in a match against England.

== Career statistics ==
=== Club ===
As of match played 10 November 2026

Appearances and goals by club, season and competition
Club	Season	League			Cup		Europe		Other		Total	
Club	Season	Division	Apps	Goals	Apps	Goals	Apps	Goals	Apps	Goals	Apps	Goals
Olimpik Donetsk	2014–15	Ukrainian Premier League	1	0	0	0	—		—		1	0
Olimpik Donetsk	2015–16	Ukrainian Premier League	0	0	0	0	—		—		0	0
Olimpik Donetsk	2016–17	Ukrainian Premier League	12	0	0	0	—		—		12	0
Olimpik Donetsk	2017–18	Ukrainian Premier League	22	0	1	0	2 (Note: Appearances in UEFA Europa League)	0	—		25	0
Olimpik Donetsk	2018–19	Ukrainian Premier League	18	0	2	0	—		—		20	0
Olimpik Donetsk	2019–20	Ukrainian Premier League	24	1	2	0	—		—		26	1
Olimpik Donetsk	2020–21	Ukrainian Premier League	9	0	1	0	—		—		10	0
Olimpik Donetsk	Total		86	1	8	0	2	0	—		96	1
Desna Chernihiv	2021–22	Ukrainian Premier League	15	0	0	0	—		—		15	0
Urartu	2022–23	Armenian Premier League	25	4	2	0	—		—		27	4
Urartu	2023–24	Armenian Premier League	19	0	2	0	4 (Note: Two appearances in UEFA Champions League, two appearances in UEFA Conference League)	0	1 (Note: Appearance in Armenian Supercup)	0	26	0
Urartu	Total		44	4	4	0	4	0	1	0	53	4
Concordia Chiajna	2024–25	Liga II	18	0	—		—		—		18	0
Total			18	0	0	0	0	0	0	0	18	0
Urartu	2025–26	Armenian Premier League	19	0	3	0	2 (Note: one appearances in 2025–26 UEFA Europa Conference League Second qualifying round)	0	0	0	24	0
Urartu	2026–27	Armenian Premier League	7	0	0	0	0	0	0	0	7	0
Urartu	Total		26	0	3	0	2	0	0	0	30	0
Career total			173	5	15	0	8	0	1	0	196	5

== Honours ==
Urartu

- Armenian Premier League: 2022–23
- Armenian Cup runner-up: 2025–26, 2022–23
- Armenian Supercup runner-up: 2023
