= Sandro Lima =

Brazilian footballer

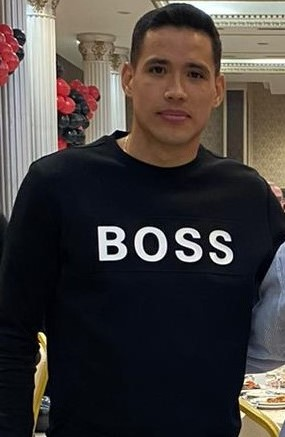

Personal information
- Full name: Sandro César Cordovil de Lima
- Date of birth: 28 October 1990 (age 36)
- Place of birth: Belém, Brazil
- Height: 1.86 m (6 ft 1 in)
- Position: Forward

Team information
- Current team: Ararat-Armenia
- Number: 91

Senior career*
Years	Team	Apps	(Gls)
2011	ASEEV		
2012	Goiatuba		
2012	Grêmio Anápolis		
2012–2013	Independente		
2013–2020	Grêmio Anápolis	11	(4)
2013–2014	→ Rio Ave (loan)	13	(0)
2014–2015	→ Académico de Viseu (loan)	42	(12)
2015–2016	→ Chaves (loan)	25	(7)
2016–2018	→ Académico de Viseu (loan)	62	(16)
2018–2019	→ Estoril (loan)	33	(7)
2019–2020	→ Gil Vicente (loan)	32	(10)
2020–2021	Tianjin TEDA	10	(1)
2021–2022	Gençlerbirliği	47	(15)
2022–2023	Gwangju	31	(8)
2023–2024	Manisa	31	(11)
2024–2025	Pendikspor	12	(1)
2025	Atlético Goianense	17	(3)
2025–2026	Alverca	29	(5)
2026–	Ararat-Armenia	7	(3)
- * Club domestic league appearances and goals as of 2 November 2026

Sandro César Cordovil de Lima (born 28 October 1990) is a Brazilian professional football player who plays as a forward for Armenian Premier League club Ararat-Armenia.

== Career ==
Sandro Lima made his professional debut in the Primeira Liga for Rio Ave on 1 September 2013 in a game against Arouca.

On 19 June 2022, he joined Gwangju FC.

On 2 July 2026, Armenian Premier League club Ararat-Armenia unveiled Lima as one of their summer signings.

== Career statistics ==
As of match played 1 November 2026

Appearances and goals by club, season and competition
Club	Season	League			State league		National cup		League cup		Continental		Other		Total	
Club	Season	Division	Apps	Goals	Apps	Goals	Apps	Goals	Apps	Goals	Apps	Goals	Apps	Goals	Apps	Goals
Grêmio Anápolis	2013	Campeonato Goiano	—		11	4	—		—		—		—		11	4
Rio Ave (loan)	2013–14	Primeira Liga	13	0	—		1	0	3	0	—		—		17	0
Académico de Viseu (loan)	2014–15	Segunda Liga	42	12	—		1	1	4	0	—		—		47	13
Chaves (loan)	2015–16	LigaPro	25	7	—		1	0	1	0	—		—		27	7
Académico de Viseu (loan)	2016–17	LigaPro	25	5	—		0	0	0	0	—		2	1	27	6
Académico de Viseu (loan)	2017–18	LigaPro	37	11	—		1	0	1	0	—		—		39	11
Académico de Viseu (loan)	Total		62	16	—		1	0	1	0	—		2	1	66	17
Estoril (loan)	2018–19	LigaPro	33	7	—		2	0	4	2	—		—		39	9
Gil Vicente (loan)	2019–20	Primeira Liga	32	10	—		1	1	3	2	—		—		36	13
Tianjin TEDA	2020	Chinese Super League	10	1	—		4	2	—		—		—		14	3
Gençlerbirliği	2020–21	Süper Lig	16	2	—		—		—		—		—		16	2
Gençlerbirliği	2021–22	1. Lig	31	13	—		0	0	—		—		—		31	13
Gençlerbirliği	Total		47	15	—		0	0	—		—		—		47	15
Gwangju FC	2022	K League 2	19	7	—		—		—		—		—		19	7
Gwangju FC	2023	K League 1	12	1	—		0	0	—		—		—		12	1
Gwangju FC	Total		31	8	—		0	0	—		—		—		31	8
Manisa	2023–24	1. Lig	31	11	—		1	0	—		—		—		32	11
Pendikspor	2024–25	1. Lig	12	1	—		0	0	—		—		—		12	1
Atlético Goianiense	2025	Série B	17	3	6	1	1	0	—		—		—		24	4
Alverca	2025–26	Primeira Liga	29	5	—		1	0	1	1	—		—		31	6
Ararat-Armenia	2026–27	Armenian Premier League	7	3	—		1	0	—		11 (Note: Six appearances and three goals in the UEFA Champions League, five appearances and one goal in the UEFA Europa League)	4	—		19	7
Career total			391	99	17	5	15	4	17	5	11	4	2	1	453	118

== Honours ==
Individual

- Primeira Liga Forward of the Month: February 2020
