= Jean Quiñónez =

Ecuadorian footballer (born 2001)

Personal information
- Full name: Jean Carlos Quiñónez Preciado
- Date of birth: 1 December 2001 (age 24)
- Place of birth: Esmeraldas, Ecuador
- Height: 1.76 m (5 ft 9 1/2 in)
- Position: Left back

Team information
- Current team: Sardarapat
- Number: 19

Youth career
- Atlético Porteño
- Universidad Católica
- → Palmeiras

Senior career*
Years	Team	Apps	(Gls)
2017	Club Atlético Porteño	1	(0)
2019–2022	Norte América	0	(0)
2020	→ Gafanha (loan)	0	(0)
2021	→ Santa Cruz (loan)	3	(0)
2022	→ LDU Quito (loan)	3	(0)
2022	→ Guayaquil City (loan)	2	(0)
2023–2025	Deportes Quindío	16	(0)
2023–2024	→ Hapoel Petah Tikva (loan)	18	(0)
2025	SKA-Khabarovsk	3	(0)
2025	Emelec	8	(0)
2026	Cumbayá	1	(0)
2026–	Sardarapat	13	(0)
- * Club domestic league appearances and goals as of 8 November 2026

Jean Carlos Quiñónez Preciado (born 1 December 2001) is an Ecuadorian professional footballer who plays as a defender for Sardarapat.

== Career ==
=== Club ===
On 12 July 2023 loaned to the Israeli Premier League club Hapoel Petah Tikva with option for buy.

== Career statistics ==
=== Club ===
As of 16 March 2024.

Club	Season	League			Cup		Continental		Other		Total	
Club	Season	Division	Apps	Goals	Apps	Goals	Apps	Goals	Apps	Goals	Apps	Goals
Club Atlético Porteño	2017	Segunda Categoría	1	0	0	0	0	0	–		1	0
Gafanha	2020	Campeonato de Portugal (league)	0	0	0	0	0	0	–		0	0
Santa Cruz	2021	Campeonato Brasileiro Série C	5	0	0	0	0	0	–		5	0
L.D.U. Quito	2022	Ecuadorian Serie A	3	0	0	0	1	0	–		4	0
Guayaquil City	2022	Ecuadorian Serie A	2	0	0	0	0	0	–		2	0
Deportes Quindío	2023	Categoría Primera B	0	0	0	0	0	0	–		0	0
Hapoel Petah Tikva	2023–24	Israeli Premier League	18	0	2	0	0	0	–		20	0
Career total			29	0	2	0	1	0	0	0	32	0
