= Bruno Wilson =

Portuguese footballer

Personal information
- Full name: Bruno Ricardo Valdez Wilson
- Date of birth: 27 December 1996 (age 29)
- Place of birth: Lisbon, Portugal
- Height: 1.92 m (6 ft 4 in)
- Position: Centre-back

Team information
- Current team: Ararat-Armenia
- Number: 43

Youth career
- 2004–2005: Oeiras
- 2005–2015: Sporting CP

Senior career*
Years	Team	Apps	(Gls)
2016–2019	Braga B	95	(2)
2016	Braga	1	(0)
2019–2020	Tondela	15	(2)
2020–2021	Braga	6	(1)
2020–2021	→ Tenerife (loan)	19	(1)
2021–2024	Vizela	57	(1)
2024–2025	San Jose Earthquakes	29	(2)
2026–	Ararat-Armenia	6	(0)

International career^{‡}
2011–2012	Portugal U16	6	(0)
2013	Portugal U17	5	(0)
2013–2014	Portugal U18	7	(0)
2016	Portugal U20	3	(0)
2026–	Mozambique	3	(0)
- * Club domestic league appearances and goals as of 10:12, 13 November 2026 (UTC) ‡ National team caps and goals as of 08:40, 16 November 2026 (UTC)

Bruno Ricardo Valdez Wilson (born 27 December 1996) is a professional footballer who plays as a central defender for Armenian Premier League club Ararat-Armenia. Born in Portugal, he represents the Mozambique national team.

== Club career ==
=== Braga ===
Born in Lisbon, Wilson played youth football for Sporting CP in the city. He was an unused substitute for the reserves in the Segunda Liga on 4 May 2014, in a 1–1 home draw against S.L. Benfica B.

On 3 January 2016, Wilson signed a two-year deal at S.C. Braga, being assigned to their second team of the same level. He made his league debut on 13 February, playing the full 90 minutes of a 1–0 loss at C.D. Mafra. He totalled 17 appearances over the season, being sent off in a 2–0 home defeat to S.C. Covilhã on 27 February and scoring in a 3–2 loss at Vitória S.C. B on 17 April.

Wilson was called up to the first team by coach José Peseiro in place of the injured Lazar Rosić for a Primeira Liga game at home to F.C. Paços de Ferreira on 11 December 2016. He played the full 90 minutes of a 3–0 win.

=== Tondela ===
On 26 June 2019, Wilson signed a three-year contract with C.D. Tondela, with Braga retaining 50% of the player's rights. He scored his first top-flight goal on 3 November, the only one late on in a home game against former club Sporting.

=== Return to Braga ===
Wilson returned to the Estádio Municipal de Braga on 31 January 2020, agreeing to a three-year deal with an option for three additional seasons. He scored his first competitive goal against Vitória F.C. on 23 February, in a 3–1 home victory.

On 30 August 2020, Wilson was loaned for a year to CD Tenerife of Spain's Segunda División. He made 21 total appearances for the team from the Canary Islands, and scored to open a 2–0 home win over Girona FC on 21 December.

=== Vizela ===
On 22 June 2021, Wilson joined newly-promoted F.C. Vizela on a three-year contract. During his spell, always spent in the main division, he played 68 games in all competitions and scored three goals.

=== San Jose Earthquakes ===
On 8 February 2024, Wilson signed a two-year deal with Major League Soccer side San Jose Earthquakes. He scored his first goal on 30 March, in the first minute of an eventual 2–1 loss at Houston Dynamo FC.

Wilson was not retained for the 2026 season.

=== Ararat-Armenia ===
On 2 July 2026, Wilson joined Armenian Premier League club FC Ararat-Armenia.

== International career ==
Wilson earned caps for Portugal at youth level. In July 2024, through naturalization, he became eligible for the Mozambique national team.

Wilson was called up by Mozambique for the first time on 31 August 2026, for matches with Senegal and Sudan in the 2027 Africa Cup of Nations qualifiers. He made his debut on 25 September, in a 1–1 home draw against the former.

== Personal life ==
Wilson's grandfather, Mário, was also a footballer and later a manager of clubs including S.L. Benfica, and the Portugal national team. Through him, he had American and Mozambican heritage.

== Career statistics ==
=== Club ===
As of match played 6 November 2026

Appearances and goals by club, season and competition
Club	Season	League			National cup (Note: Includes Taça de Portugal, Copa del Rey, U.S. Open Cup, Armenian Cup)		Continental		Other		Total	
Club	Season	Division	Apps	Goals	Apps	Goals	Apps	Goals	Apps	Goals	Apps	Goals
Braga B	2015–16	Liga Portugal 2	17	1	—		—		—		17	1
Braga B	2016–17	Liga Portugal 2	33	1	—		—		—		33	1
Braga B	2017–18	Liga Portugal 2	14	0	—		—		—		14	0
Braga B	2018–19	Liga Portugal 2	31	0	—		—		—		31	0
Braga B	Total		95	2	0	0	0	0	0	0	95	2
Braga	2016–17	Primeira Liga	1	0	1	0	—		—		2	0
Tondela	2019–20	Primeira Liga	15	2	—		—		1 (Note: Appearances in Taça da Liga)	0	16	2
Braga	2019–20	Primeira Liga	6	1	—		—		—		6	1
Tenerife (loan)	2020–21	Segunda División	19	1	2	0	—		—		21	1
Vizela	2021–22	Primeira Liga	17	1	2	0	—		0	0	19	1
Vizela	2022–23	Primeira Liga	24	0	2	0	—		3	1	29	1
Vizela	2023–24	Primeira Liga	16	0	3	1	—		1	0	20	1
Vizela	Total		57	1	7	1	0	0	4	1	68	3
San Jose Earthquakes	2024	Major League Soccer	13	1	1	0	—		—		11	1
San Jose Earthquakes	2025	Major League Soccer	16	1	0	0	—		—		11	1
San Jose Earthquakes	Total		29	2	1	0	0	0	0	0	30	2
Ararat-Armenia	2026–27	Armenian Premier League	6	0	0	0	12 (Note: Six appearances and zero goals in the UEFA Champions League, six appearances and two goals in the UEFA Europa League)	2	0 (Note: Appearance in Armenian Super Cup)	0	18	2
Total			228	9	11	1	12	2	5	1	256	13

=== International ===
As of match played 13 November 2026

Appearances and goals by national team and year
National team	Year	Apps	Goals
Mozambique
Mozambique	2026	3	0
Total		3	0
