= Aleksandr Mishiyev =

Armenian footballer (born 2004)

Personal information
- Full name: Aleksandr Vladimirovich Mishiyev
- Date of birth: 29 January 2004 (age 22)
- Place of birth: Pyatigorsk, Russia
- Height: 1.88 m (6 ft 2 in)
- Position: Goalkeeper

Team information
- Current team: Urartu
- Number: 92

Youth career
- Mashuk-KMV

Senior career*
Years	Team	Apps	(Gls)
2020–2023	Mashuk-KMV	1	(0)
2023–	Urartu	29	(0)
2023–2025	→ Urartu-2 (loan)	22	(0)

International career^{‡}
2026–	Armenia	3	(0)
- * Club domestic league appearances and goals as of 12 September 2026 ‡ National team caps and goals as of 15 November 2026

Aleksandr Vladimirovich Mishiyev (Armenian: Ալեքսանդր Միշիև; Russian: Александр Владимирович Мишиев; born 29 January 2004) is a football player who plays as a goalkeeper for Armenian Premier League club Urartu. Born in Russia, he plays for the Armenia national team.

== Club career ==
Mishiyev, a product of the local Pyatigorsk football academy, joined the Mashuk-KMV squad in august 2020.

== International career ==
Mishiyev is of Armenian descent on his mother's side.

Mishiyev made his debut for Armenia national team on 9 June 2026 in a friendly against Moldova.

== Career statistics ==
=== International ===
As of 15 November 2026

Armenia
Year	Apps	Goals
2026	3	0
Total	3	0
