= Luis Felipe (footballer, born 2001) =

Brazilian footballer

Personal information
- Full name: Luis Felipe Hungria Martins
- Date of birth: 17 May 2001 (age 25)
- Place of birth: Cuiabá, Brazil
- Height: 1.88 m (6 ft 2 in)
- Position: Defender

Team information
- Current team: Ararat-Armenia
- Number: 5

Youth career
- –2020: Coritiba
- 2020: PSV Eindhoven

Senior career*
Years	Team	Apps	(Gls)
2020–2022	PSV Eindhoven	1	(0)
2020–2022	Jong PSV	34	(0)
2022–2024	Cruzeiro	3	(0)
2023	→ Tombense (loan)	6	(1)
2024	Londrina EC	9	(0)
2024–2025	SC Beira-Mar	10	(0)
2025–2026	Ethnikos Achna	27	(0)
2026–	Ararat-Armenia	7	(0)
- * Club domestic league appearances and goals as of 22 September 2026

Luis Felipe Hungria Martins (born 17 May 2001), known as just Luis Felipe, is a Brazilian footballer who plays as a defender for Armenian Premier League club Ararat-Armenia.

== Club ==
On 20 June 2026, Armenian Premier League club Ararat-Armenia announced the signing of Felipe from Ethnikos Achna.

== Career statistics ==
=== Club ===
As of match played 20 September 2026

Appearances and goals by club, season and competition
Club	Season	League			State league		National cup (Note: Includes KNVB Cup, Copa do Brasil, Taça de Portugal)		Continental		Other		Total	
Club	Season	Division	Apps	Goals	Apps	Goals	Apps	Goals	Apps	Goals	Apps	Goals	Apps	Goals
Jong PSV	2020-21	Eerste Divisie	20	0	—		—		—		—		20	0
Jong PSV	2021-22	Eerste Divisie	14	0	—		—		—		—		14	0
Jong PSV	Total		34	0	—		—		—		—		34	0
PSV	2020-21	Eredivisie	1	0	—		0	0	0	0	—		1	0
Cruzeiro	2022	Série B	3	0	0	0	0	0	—		—		3	0
Cruzeiro	2023	Série A	0	0	0	0	0	0	—		—		0	0
Cruzeiro	Total		3	0	0	0	0	0	0	0	0	0	3	0
Tombense (loan)	2023	Série B	5	1	1 (Note: Appearance(s) in Campeonato Mineiro)	0	1	0	—		0	0	7	1
Londrina	2024	Série C	0	0	9 (Note: Appearance(s) in Campeonato Paranaense)	0	—		—		—		9	0
Beira-Mar	2024-25	Campeonato de Portugal	10	0	—		0	0	—		—		10	0
Ethnikos Achna	2025–26	Cypriot First Division	27	0	—		0	0	—		—		27	0
Ararat-Armenia	2026–27	Armenian Premier League	7	0	—		0	0	3 (Note: Three appearances in the UEFA Champions League)	0	0 (Note: Appearance in Armenian Super Cup)	0	10	0
Career total			87	1	10	0	1	0	3	0	0	0	101	1

== Honours ==
Cruzeiro

- Campeonato Brasileiro - Série B: 2022
