= Maxence Carlier =

French footballer (born 1997)

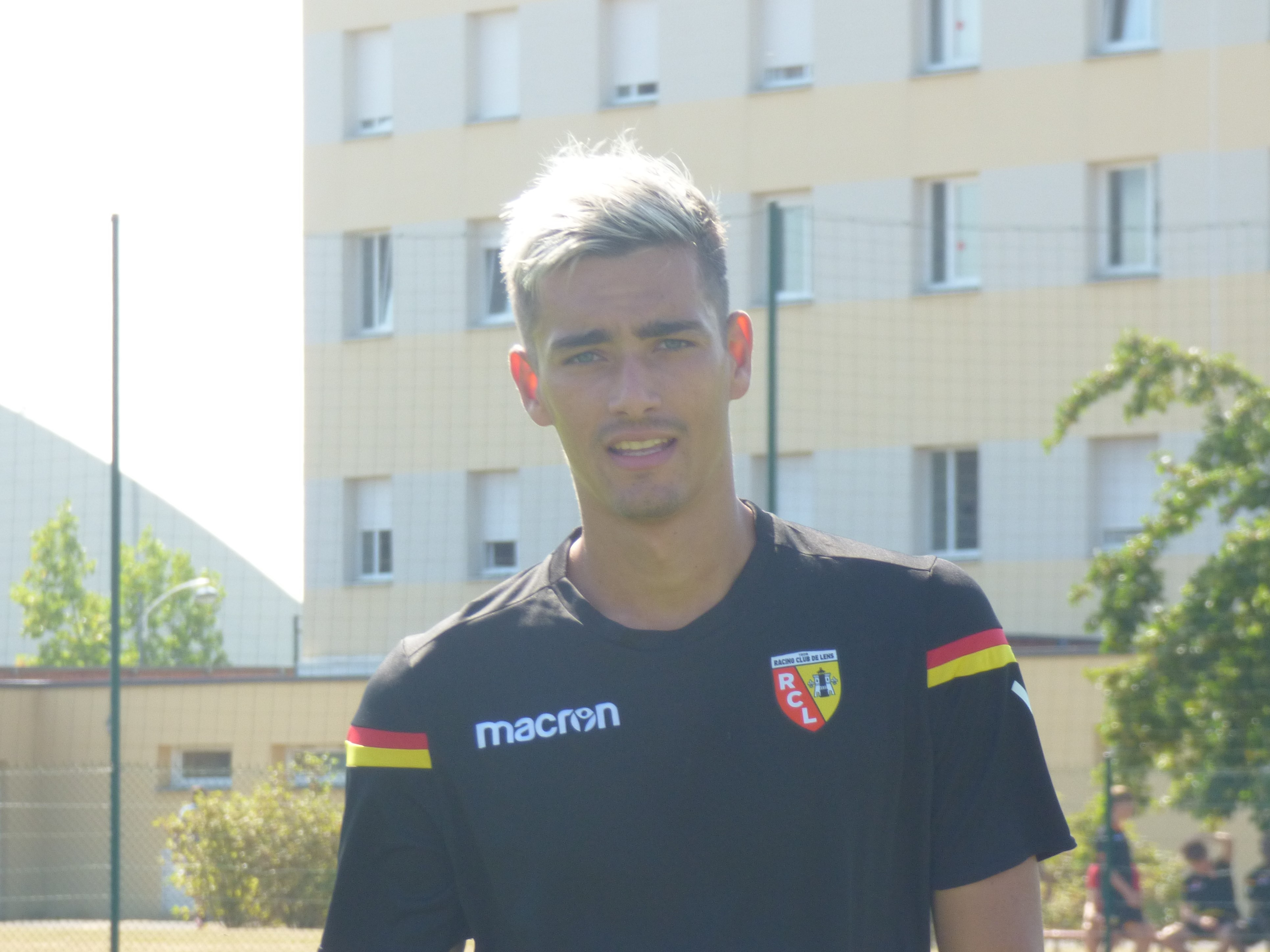
- Carlier in 2018

Personal information
- Date of birth: 15 March 1997 (age 29)
- Place of birth: Lens, Pas-de-Calais, France
- Height: 1.86 m (6 ft 1 in)
- Position: Midfielder

Team information
- Current team: Ararat-Armenia
- Number: 17

Youth career
- 2013–2017: Lens

Senior career*
Years	Team	Apps	(Gls)
2015–2017	Lens II	37	(1)
2017–2020	Lens	3	(0)
2017–2018	→ Tubize (loan)	20	(0)
2018–2019	→ Tours (loan)	22	(0)
2019–2020	→ Laval (loan)	21	(0)
2020–2022	Laval	35	(1)
2022–2023	Sedan	27	(2)
2023–2026	Nancy	88	(3)
2026–	Ararat-Armenia	7	(0)
- * Club domestic league appearances and goals as of 6 October 2026

Maxence Carlier (born 15 March 1997) is a French professional footballer who plays as a right-back for Armenian Premier League club Ararat-Armenia.

== Club career ==
On 13 July 2017, Carlier signed his first professional contract with his childhood club Lens. Carlier made his professional debut for Lens in a 1–0 Ligue 2 loss to Auxerre on 31 February 2017.

On 31 August 2017, Carlier joined Belgian club Tubize on loan for the remainder of the 2017–18 season. The following August he was loaned to Tours for the season, and at the start of the 2019–20 season to Laval, where he went on to sign a permanent deal in January 2020.

In May 2022, he signed for Sedan.

On 5 July 2026, Armenian Premier League club Ararat-Armenia announced the signing of Carlier.

== Career statistics ==
=== Club ===
As of match played 20 September 2026.

Appearances and goals by club, season and competition
Club	Season	League			National cup (Note: Includes Armenian Cup)		Continental		Other		Total	
Club	Season	Division	Apps	Goals	Apps	Goals	Apps	Goals	Apps	Goals	Apps	Goals
Sedan	2022–23	Championnat National	27	2	2	1	-		-		29	3
Nancy	2023–24	Championnat National	30	2	1	0	-		-		31	2
Nancy	2024–25	Championnat National	31	1	2	0	-		-		33	1
Nancy	2025–26	Ligue 2	27	0	1	0	-		-		28	0
Nancy	Total		88	3	4	0	-	-	-	-	92	0
Ararat-Armenia	2026–27	Armenian Premier League	7	0	0	0	6 (Note: Four appearances in the UEFA Champions League, two appearances in the UEFA Europa League)	0	0 (Note: Appearance in Armenian Super Cup)	0	13	0
Career total			122	5	6	1	6	0	0	0	134	6

== Honours ==
Laval

- Championnat National: 2021–22

Nancy

- Championnat National: 2024–25
