= João Bravim =

Brazilian footballer

Personal information
- Full name: João Victor Donna Bravim
- Date of birth: 3 May 1998 (age 28)
- Place of birth: Venda Nova do Imigrante, Brazil
- Height: 1.92 m (6 ft 4 in)
- Position: Goalkeeper

Team information
- Current team: Ararat-Armenia
- Number: 98

Youth career
- 2004–2011: Rio Branco
- 2011–2014: América Mineiro
- 2014–2017: Cruzeiro
- 2017–2018: Santos
- 2018–2019: Alverca

Senior career*
Years	Team	Apps	(Gls)
2019–2021	Alverca	3	(0)
2020–2021	→ Casa Pia (loan)	1	(0)
2021–2023	Casa Pia	2	(0)
2023–2026	Santa Clara	0	(0)
2024–2025	→ Alverca (loan)	51	(0)
2025–2026	→ União de Leiria (loan)	29	(0)
2026–	Ararat-Armenia	4	(0)
- * Club domestic league appearances and goals as of 29 October 2026

João Victor Donna Bravim (born 3 May 1998) is a Brazilian professional footballer who plays as a goalkeeper for Armenian Premier League club Ararat-Armenia.

== Professional career ==
Bravim is a youth product of the Brazilian clubs Rio Branco, América Mineiro, Cruzeiro and Santos, before moving to Portugal with Alverca in 2018. He began his senior career with Alverca in the Portuguese third division in the 2019–20 season. He transferred to LigaPro side Casa Pia on 1 October 2020, where he acted as reserve goalkeeper. After helping them achieve promotion into the Primeira Liga for the 2022–23 season, Bravim extended his contract with Casa Pia on 13 June 2022.

On 7 July 2023, Bravim signed a two-year contract with Liga Portugal 2 club Santa Clara.

On 4 January 2024, Santa Clara loaned Bravim to his first professional club, Alverca, competing in Liga 3.

On 2 July 2025, Bravim moved on loan to União de Leiria, with an option to buy.

On 2 July 2026, Armenian Premier League club Ararat-Armenia announced the signing of Bravim from Santa Clara.

== Personal life ==
Born in Brazil, Bravim is of Italian descent.

== Career statistics ==
=== Club ===
As of match played 26 October 2026.

Appearances and goals by club, season and competition
Club	Season	League			National cup (Note: Includes Armenian Cup)		Continental		Other		Total	
Club	Season	Division	Apps	Goals	Apps	Goals	Apps	Goals	Apps	Goals	Apps	Goals
Ararat-Armenia	2026–27	Armenian Premier League	4	0	0	0	11 (Note: Six appearances in the UEFA Champions League, five appearances in the UEFA Europa League)	0	0 (Note: Appearance in Armenian Super Cup)	0	15	0
Career total			4	0	0	0	11	0	0	0	15	0
