= Iman Griffith =

Dutch footballer (born 2001)

Personal information
- Date of birth: 2 December 2001 (age 24)
- Place of birth: Heerenveen, Netherlands
- Height: 1.70 m (5 ft 7 in)
- Position: Winger

Team information
- Current team: Pyunik
- Number: 10

Youth career
- –2017: Zeeburgia
- 2017–2019: AZ

Senior career*
Years	Team	Apps	(Gls)
2019–2024	Jong AZ	77	(10)
2023–2024	→ Fortuna Sittard (loan)	12	(0)
2024–2026	Roda JC	45	(5)
2026–	Pyunik	4	(1)
- * Club domestic league appearances and goals as of 17:39, 10 September 2026 (UTC)

Iman Griffith (born 2 December 2001) is a Dutch professional footballer who plays as a winger for Armenian Premier League club Pyunik.

== Club career ==
Born in Heerenveen, Griffith played youth football for Zeeburgia until 2017, before joining AZ's youth academy. He made his professional debut with Jong AZ in a 3–2 Eerste Divisie loss to Volendam on 25 October 2019, replacing Zakaria Aboukhlal in the 72nd minute.

On 1 September 2023, Griffith moved on loan to Fortuna Sittard, with an option to buy. He made 14 competitive appearances for the club during his sole season at the club.

Griffith signed a two-year contract with Eerste Divisie club Roda JC on 25 June 2024, including an option to extend for another year. He made his debut for the club on 12 August, coming on for Enrique Peña Zauner in the 60th minute of the season's opening fixture against his former team Jong AZ, which ended in a heavy 6–1 defeat.

In July 2026, Griffith joined Armenian Premier League club Pyunik.

== Personal life ==
Born in the Netherlands, Griffith is of Surinamese descent.

== Career statistics ==
As of match played 17 December 2025

Appearances and goals by club, season and competition
Club	Season	League			National cup		Europe		Total	
Club	Season	Division	Apps	Goals	Apps	Goals	Apps	Goals	Apps	Goals
Jong AZ	2019–20	Eerste Divisie	2	0	—		—		2	0
Jong AZ	2020–21	Eerste Divisie	7	0	—		—		7	0
Jong AZ	2021–22	Eerste Divisie	32	5	—		—		32	5
Jong AZ	2022–23	Eerste Divisie	33	5	—		—		33	5
Jong AZ	2023–24	Eerste Divisie	3	0	—		—		3	0
Jong AZ	Total		77	10	—		—		77	10
Fortuna Sittard (loan)	2023–24	Eredivisie	12	0	2	0	—		14	0
Roda JC	2024–25	Eerste Divisie	14	1	1	0	—		15	1
Roda JC	2025–26	Eerste Divisie	15	2	2	2	—		17	4
Roda JC	Total		29	3	3	2	—		32	5
Career total			118	13	5	2	0	0	123	15
