= FC Andranik =

Association football club in Armenia

Andranik FC
- Founded: 2023; 3 years ago
- Ground: Sevan Stadium
- Capacity: 500
- League: Armenian First League
- 2024-25: 7th of 13

Andranik Football Club (Armenian: Անդրանիկ ՖԱ, romanized: Andranik Futbolayin Akumb) commonly known as Andranik FC, is an Armenian football club based in Sevan. They currently play in the Armenian First League. The home stadium of the team is the Sevan Stadium. The club headquarters are located in Vardenis 1601, st. Lernagortsneri 6.

== History ==
The club was founded in Sevan. They took part in their first professional championship in Armenian First League in 2023/24 season and finished 6th. The club also participated in Armenian Cup, losing in First Round 6–0 to BKMA.

In 2024–25 edition of tournament Andranik FC lost again in the first round, in a match against Van. They finished 7th in the league the same season.

== Domestic history ==
| Season | League | | | | | | | | | Top goalscorer | | Manager | |
| Season | Div. | Pos. | Pl. | W | D | L | GS | GA | GD | National Cup | Name | Manager | Goals |
|---|---|---|---|---|---|---|---|---|---|---|---|---|---|
| 2023-24 | Armenian First League | 6th | 28 | 12 | 5 | 11 | 41 | 5 | -4 | First Round | | | |
| 2024-25 | Armenian First League | 7th | 24 | 9 | 7 | 8 | 41 | 40 | +1 | First Round | | | |

== Stadium ==
The club plays its home matches in Sevan, on a 500-seater local stadium, built in 2018.
