= França (footballer, born 1995) =

Brazilian footballer

Carlos França
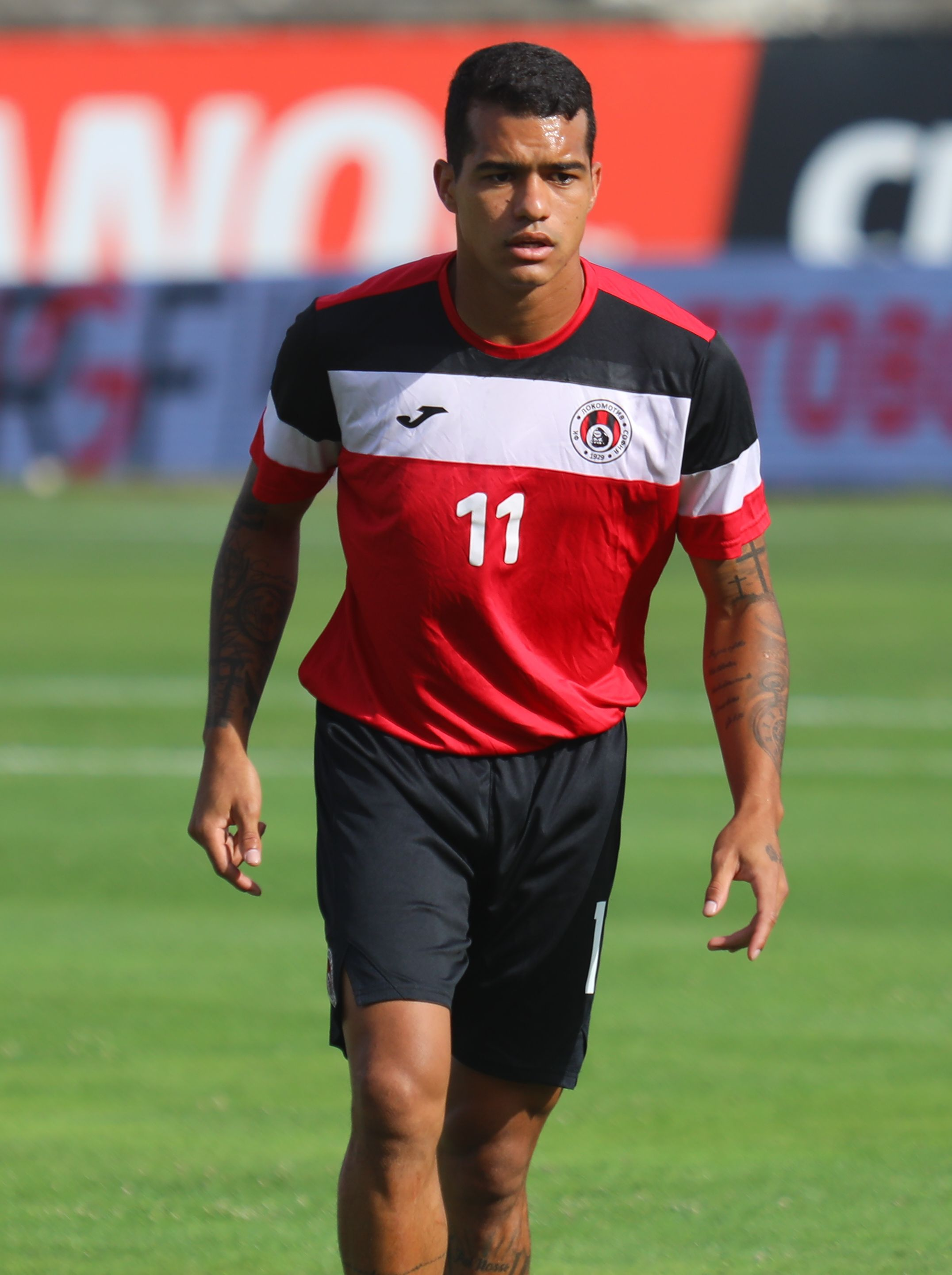
- França playing for Lokomotiv Sofia in 2022

Personal information
- Full name: Carlos Henrique França Freires
- Date of birth: 9 February 1995 (age 31)
- Place of birth: Brasília, Brazil
- Height: 1.73 m (5 ft 8 in)
- Position: Forward

Team information
- Current team: Ararat-Armenia
- Number: 95

Senior career*
Years	Team	Apps	(Gls)
2016–2017	Comercial-SP	11	(0)
2018	Cruzeiro-RS	8	(1)
2018–2022	Cianorte	17	(1)
2018–2019	→ América Mineiro (loan)	26	(3)
2020–2021	→ Mirassol (loan)	17	(3)
2021	→ São José (loan)	11	(1)
2021	→ Santa Cruz (loan)	9	(0)
2021–2022	→ Caxias (loan)	16	(2)
2022	→ Brasil de Pelotas (loan)	7	(0)
2022–2024	Lokomotiv Sofia	65	(10)
2024–2025	Mohammedan	24	(1)
2025–2026	Persijap Jepara	30	(10)
2026–	Ararat-Armenia	11	(3)
- * Club domestic league appearances and goals as of 29 October 2026

Carlos Henrique França Freires (born 9 February 1995), simply known as França, is a Brazilian professional footballer who plays as a forward for Armenian Premier League club Ararat-Armenia.

== Career ==
=== Comercial-SP ===
França made his league debut for Comercial-SP against Itapirense on 12 March 2016.

=== Cruzeiro-RS ===
França made his league debut for Cruzeiro-RS against Brasil de Pelotas on 21 January 2018. He scored his first goal for the club against São Luiz on 3 March 2018, scoring in the 84th minute.

=== Cianorte ===
França made his league debut for Cianorte against Ferroviária on 29 April 2018. He scored his first goal for the club against Coritiba on 26 July 2020, scoring in the 83rd minute.

=== América Mineiro ===
Having featured in 2018 Campeonato Brasileiro Série D for Cianorte, França was loaned to América Mineiro in June 2018, with a view to strengthening the club's Under 23 team in the Campeonato Brasileiro de Aspirantes. He made his debut for the club against Bahia on 25 November 2018 and earned himself another loan with América for 2019. França scored his first league goals for the club against Boa on 24 February 2019, scoring in the 29th and 76th minute.

=== Mirassol ===
França made his league debut for Mirassol against Bangu on 20 September 2020. He scored his first goal for the club against Toledo on 1 October 2020, scoring a penalty in the 87th minute.

=== São José ===
França made his league debut for São José against Esportivo on 27 February 2021. He scored his first goal for the club against Novo Hamburgo on 25 April 2021, scoring in the 76th minute.

=== Santa Cruz ===
França made his league debut for Santa Cruz against Afogados on 2 May 2021.

=== Caxias ===
França made his league debut for Caxias against Marcílio Dias on 24 July 2021. He scored his first goal for the club against Novo Hamburgo on 20 February 2022, scoring in the 41st minute.

=== Brasil de Pelotas ===
França made his league debut for Brasil de Pelotas against Manaus on 12 April 2022.

=== Lokomotiv Sofia ===
França made his league debut for Lokomotiv Sofia against Cherno More on 10 July 2022. He scored his first goals for the club against CSKA Sofia on 16 July 2022, scoring a penalty in the 21st minute.

=== Ararat-Armenia ===
On 25 June 2026, Armenian Premier League club Ararat-Armenia announced the signing of França from Persijap Jepara. França scored on his debut for Ararat, scoring the second goal in their 2-0 win over Latvian club Riga, in the First qualifying round of the 2026–27 UEFA Champions League.

== Career statistics ==
=== Club ===
As of match played 29 October 2026.

Appearances and goals by club, season and competition
Club	Season	League			National cup (Note: Includes Armenian Cup)		Continental		Other		Total	
Club	Season	Division	Apps	Goals	Apps	Goals	Apps	Goals	Apps	Goals	Apps	Goals
Ararat-Armenia	2026–27	Armenian Premier League	11	3	1	1	11 (Note: Six appearances and two goals in the UEFA Champions League, five appearances and zero goals in the UEFA Europa League)	2	0 (Note: Appearance in Armenian Super Cup)	0	23	6
Career total			11	3	1	1	11	2	0	0	23	6
