= FC Sardarapat =

Armenian football club

Sardarapat
- Full name: Football Club Sardarapat
- Founded: 2021; 5 years ago
- Ground: Hakob Tonoyan Stadium
- Capacity: 3,120
- Owner: RC Lens
- Chairman: Joseph Oughourlian
- Manager: Alexandre Torres
- League: Armenian Premier League
- 2025–26: Armenian First League, 1st (Promoted)
- Website: www.sardarapatfc.am

Football Club Sardarapat is an Armenian professional football club based in Armavir.

== History ==
FC Sardarapat was founded 2021, with a focus on academy development, with a training partnership with RC Lens.

Prior to the 2025–26 season, Sardarapat were granted a license to play in the Armenian First League, where they went on to win the league and earn promotion to the Armenian Premier League.

=== Domestic ===
Season	League									National Cup	Top goalscorer		Manager
Season	Div.	Pos.	Pl.	W	D	L	GS	GA	P	National Cup	Name	Goals	Manager
2025–26	Armenian First League	1	30	24	4	2	81	18	76	Round of 16	(Armenia) Hamlet Minasyan	30	(France) Alexandre Torres

== Current squad ==
As of 9 September 2026

Note: Flags indicate national team as defined under FIFA eligibility rules; some limited exceptions apply. Players may hold more than one non-FIFA nationality.

No.	Pos.	Nation	Player
1	GK	ARM	Sergey Mikaelyan
2	DF	ARM	Hayk Hovhannisyan
3	DF	CIV	Vayanga Doumbia
4	DF	ARM	Armen Sargsyan
5	DF	SEN	Ousmane Konaté
7	MF	ARM	Hovhannes Kirakosyan
8	FW	ARM	Levon Petrosyan
9	FW	ARM	Levon Vardanyan
10	MF	RUS	Yuriy Budagyan
11	FW	ARM	Robert Potinyan
13	MF	NGR	Suleiman Alabi
14	MF	CIV	Florian Seri
16	DF	ARM	Esayi Baghramyan

No.	Pos.	Nation	Player
17	DF	ARM	Tigran Ayunts
19	DF	ECU	Jean Quiñónez
21	MF	ARM	Serob Galstyan
22	DF	ARM	Sergey Kochkanyan
23	FW	ARM	Misak Hakobyan
25	DF	CIV	Christ Yann Lago
27	FW	ARM	Janik Davtyan
28	FW	ARM	Hamlet Minasyan
31	GK	ARM	Vache Gabrielyan
39	GK	ARM	Gor Matinyan
44	DF	ARM	Artur Daniyelyan
77	MF	ARM	Gor Abrahamyan
99	DF	ARM	Arman Mkrtchyan

For recent transfers, see Transfers summer 2026 and Transfers winter 2026–27.

== Honours ==
=== Domestic ===
- Armenian First League
  - Winners (1): 2025–26

== Personnel ==
=== Technical staff ===
Position	Name
Head coach	(France) Alexandre Torres
Assistant coach	(Armenia) Zaven Badoyan
Goalkeepers Coach	(France) Armen Kirakosyan
Fitness coach	(Armenia) Rafael Safaryan
Fitness coach	(Spain) Víctor Gómez Medel

== Managerial history ==
As of match played 20 September 2026

Name	Nat.	From	To	P	W	D	L	GS	GA	%W	Honours	Notes
Alexandre Torres	France	4 July 2025		40	28	7	5	97	34	70.00	Armenian First League (1)	

== See also ==
- Football in Armenia
- Football Federation of Armenia
