= Vahagn Tumasyan Stadium =

Soccer stadium in Armenia

Coordinates: 40.2684°N 44.6352°E

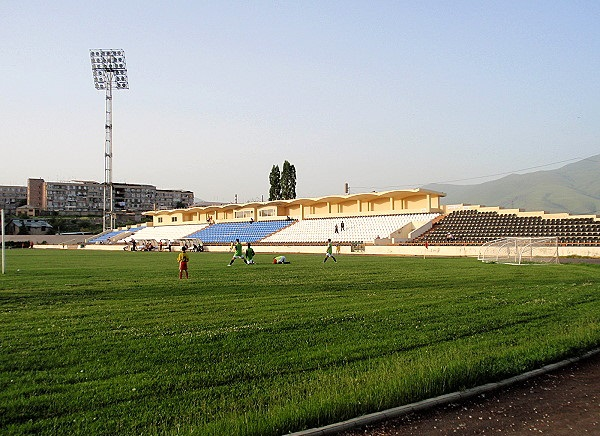
- Interactive map of Vahagn Tumasyan Stadium
- Full name: Vahagn Tumasyan Stadium
- Former names: Kotayk
- Location: Abovyan, Armenia
- Owner: Municipality of Abovyan
- Capacity: 3,149
- Surface: Grass
- Field size: 105 x 68 meters

Construction
- Built: 1965–1966
- Opened: 1966
- Renovated: 2022

Tenants
- Kotayk (1966–2005); Armenia national rugby union team (2004–2010); FC Noah

Vahagn Tumasyan Stadium (Armenian: Վահագն Թումասյանի անվան Մարզադաշտ) is an all-seater football stadium in Abovyan, Armenia.

== Overview ==
The stadium was opened in 1966 and currently holds a capacity of 3,100 seats. The stadium, which was known as Kotayk Stadium until 2006, used to have a capacity of 5,500 spectators. In 2006, the venue was turned into an all-seater stadium, thus reducing the capacity down to 3,946 seats (2,498 at the eastern stand and 1,448 at the western stand). The stadium was renamed Abovyan City Stadium during the same year. Major renovation works were executed in 2021-22.

The stadium used to be FC Kotayk Abovian's home ground during the Soviet period and after the independence of Armenia. However, when the club was dissolved, the stadium has been used by various Yerevan clubs as a temporary home venue.

The stadium was also the home ground of the Armenia national rugby union team. Between 2005 and 2008, the stadium became home to many victories achieved by the Armenian rugby team with the most recent one over Serbia in 2008, with a result of 25–0.
