= 2025–26 FC Urartu season =

Urartu
2025–26 season
- CEO: Artur Sahakyan
- Manager: Robert Arzumanyan
- Stadium: Urartu Stadium
- Premier League: 5th
- Armenian Cup: Runners Up
- UEFA Europa Conference League: First qualifying round
- Top goalscorer: League: Bruno Michel (18); All: Bruno Michel (19)
Home colours	Away colours

The 2025–26 season was FC Urartu's twenty-fifth consecutive season in the Armenian Premier League.

== Season overview ==
On 16 June, Urartu announced the return of Arman Ghazaryan and Edik Vardanyan from loan deals with Alashkert and BKMA Yerevan respectively.

On 18 June, Head Coach Dmitri Gunko was signed by Arsenal Tula, with Robert Arzumanyan being appointed as Urartu's new Head Coach on 19 June.

On 20 June, Urartu announced the signing of Yevhen Tsymbalyuk who'd last played for Concordia Chiajna.

On 23 June, Urartu announced the signing of Andrija Dragojević who'd last played for West Armenia.

On 28 June, Urartu announced the signing of Anton Bratkov who'd last played for Pyunik.

On 9 August, Urartu announced the signing of Alexandre Llovet who'd last played for Inter Club d'Escaldes.

On 25 August, Urartu announced the signing of free-agent Okezie Ebenezer who'd last played for Arda Kardzhali in 2024.

On 24 January, Urartu announced the signing of Miguel Velosa from Caldas.

On 4 June, Urartu announced that Okezie Ebenezer and Alexandre Llovet had left the club after their contracts had expired, and that Gor Matinyan and Nicholas Kaloukian had both left after agreeing to terminate their contracts.

== Squad ==
As of match played 27 May 2026

Number	Name	Nationality	Position	Date of birth (age)	Signed from	Signed in	Contract ends	Apps.	Goals
Goalkeepers
1	Gor Matinyan	(Armenia)	GK	23 June 2004 (aged 21)	BKMA Yerevan	2024		16	0
33	Andrija Dragojević	(Montenegro)	GK	25 December 1991 (aged 34)	West Armenia	2025		4	0
92	Aleksandr Mishiyev	(Russia)	GK	29 January 2004 (aged 22)	Mashuk-KMV Pyatigorsk	2023		26	0
Defenders
3	Erik Piloyan	(Armenia)	DF	29 January 2001 (aged 25)	Academy	2019		110	4
4	Arman Ghazaryan	(Armenia)	DF	24 July 2001 (aged 24)	Academy	2019		94	4
11	Okezie Ebenezer	(Nigeria)	DF	28 February 2001 (aged 25)	Unattached	2025		4	0
18	Anton Bratkov	(Ukraine)	DF	14 May 1993 (aged 33)	Pyunik	2025		27	2
19	Artur Melikyan	(Armenia)	DF	30 June 2002 (aged 23)	Academy	2020		3	0
44	Yevhen Tsymbalyuk	(Ukraine)	DF	19 June 1996 (aged 29)	Concordia Chiajna	2025		77	4
52	Zhora Dadamyan	(Armenia)	DF	26 November 2007 (aged 18)	Academy	2024		0	0
55	Erik Simonyan	(Armenia)	DF	12 June 2003 (aged 22)	Academy	2019		45	3
88	Zhirayr Margaryan	(Armenia)	DF	13 September 1997 (aged 28)	Veres Rivne	2022		162	5
99	Khariton Ayvazyan	(Armenia)	DF	8 November 2003 (aged 22)	Academy	2020		77	3
Midfielders
2	Artemi Gunko	(Russia)	MF	6 April 2004 (aged 22)	Kosmos Dolgoprudny	2025		32	5
6	Alef Santos	(Brazil)	MF	6 November 1996 (aged 29)	Dinamo Batumi	2025		33	1
7	Sergey Mkrtchyan	(Armenia)	MF	26 June 2001 (aged 24)	Academy	2021		90	3
8	Narek Agasaryan	(Armenia)	MF	15 July 2001 (aged 24)	Academy	2021		140	7
14	Artem Polyarus	(Ukraine)	MF	5 July 1992 (aged 33)	Zagłębie Sosnowiec	2024		50	5
22	Mikayel Mirzoyan	(Armenia)	MF	6 February 2001 (aged 25)	BKMA Yerevan	2023		65	6
24	Levon Bashoyan	(Armenia)	MF	15 September 2005 (aged 20)	Academy	2022		9	0
30	Bruno Michel	(Brazil)	MF	1 June 1999 (aged 26)	Figueirense	2025		45	25
34	Vahe Hovhannisyan	(Armenia)	MF	13 December 2007 (aged 18)	Academy	2025		1	0
53	Davit Harutyunyan	(Armenia)	MF	2 August 2007 (aged 18)	Academy	2024		21	0
77	Artur Israelyan	(Armenia)	MF	16 January 2004 (aged 22)	Academy	2022		5	0
90	Oleg Polyakov	(Russia)	MF	29 November 1990 (aged 35)	Armavir	2020		150	12
	Narek Aleksanyan	(Armenia)	MF	24 November 2007 (aged 18)	Academy	2024		0	0
Forwards
9	Alexandre Llovet	(France)	FW	26 November 1997 (aged 28)	Inter Club d'Escaldes	2025		22	2
10	Karen Melkonyan	(Armenia)	FW	25 March 1999 (aged 27)	Academy	2017		217	31
21	Edik Vardanyan	(Armenia)	FW	25 March 2005 (aged 21)	Academy	2022		27	3
23	Nicholas Kaloukian	(Armenia)	FW	18 February 2003 (aged 23)	Syracuse Orange	2025		42	7
27	Miguel Velosa	(Portugal)	FW	28 March 2000 (aged 26)	Caldas	2026		14	4
Players away on loan
Players who left during the season
9	Maksim Paliyenko	(Russia)	MF	18 October 1994 (aged 31)	Akron Tolyatti	2025		15	0
11	Vladislav Yakovlev	(Russia)	FW	14 February 2002 (aged 24)	on loan from CSKA Moscow	2025	2025	9	2

== Transfers ==
=== In ===
Date	Position	Nationality	Name	From	Fee	Ref.
20 June 2025	DF	(Ukraine)	Yevhen Tsymbalyuk	Unattached	Free	
23 June 2025	GK	(Montenegro)	Andrija Dragojević	Unattached	Free	
28 June 2025	DF	(Ukraine)	Anton Bratkov	Unattached	Free	
9 August 2025	FW	(France)	Alexandre Llovet	Unattached	Free	
25 August 2025	DF	(Nigeria)	Okezie Ebenezer	Unattached	Free	
24 January 2026	FW	(Portugal)	Miguel Velosa	Caldas	Unattached	

=== Loans in ===
Date from	Position	Nationality	Name	From	Date to	Ref.
21 February 2025	FW	(Russia)	Vladislav Yakovlev	CSKA Moscow	1 August 2025	

=== Released ===
Date	Position	Nationality	Name	Joined	Date	Ref
8 June 2025	FW	(Armenia)	Edgar Movsesyan	PAC Omonia 29M	30 July 2025	
9 June 2025	DF	(Nigeria)	Barry Isaac	Hegelmann	30 June 2025	
11 June 2025	GK	(Russia)	Aleksandr Melikhov	Arsenal Tula		
22 June 2025	DF	(Russia)	Aleksandr Putsko	Arsenal Tula	2 July 2025	
1 July 2025	DF	(Russia)	Dmitry Tikhy	Serik Belediyespor	20 July 2025	
5 August 2025	MF	(Russia)	Maksim Paliyenko	KDV Tomsk		
4 June 2026	GK	(Armenia)	Gor Matinyan	Sardarapat		
4 June 2026	DF	(Nigeria)	Okezie Ebenezer			
4 June 2026	FW	(Armenia)	Nicholas Kaloukian	Carolina Core		
4 June 2026	FW	(France)	Alexandre Llovet	AEP Polemidia		

== Friendlies ==
24 January 2026	Urartu	4–1	Ararat Yerevan	Yerevan
(UTC+4)	Goal	Report	Meite 2'

30 January 2026	Urartu	2–4	Uzbekistan	United Arab Emirates
(UTC+4)	Ayvazyan; Michel	Report	Goal

4 February 2026	Urartu	1–1	Qingdao West Coast	United Arab Emirates
(UTC+4)	Llovet	Report	Goal

8 February 2026	Lokomotiv Moscow	3–2	Urartu	United Arab Emirates
(UTC+4)	Goal	Report	Aleksanyan; Kaloukian

8 February 2026	Zhejiang Professional	2–0	Urartu	United Arab Emirates
(UTC+4)	Goal	Report

12 February 2026	Urartu	5–0	United Sport	United Arab Emirates
(UTC+4)	Simonyan; Velosa; Vardanyan; Kaloukian; Mirzoyan	Report

12 February 2026	Urartu	1–3	Yelimay	United Arab Emirates
(UTC+4)	Tsymbalyuk	Report	Goal

20 February 2026	Urartu	1–0	Shirak	Yerevan
(UTC+4)	Melkonyan	Report

20 February 2026	Urartu	4–0	Sardarapat	Yerevan
(UTC+4)	Kaloukian; Vardanyan; Bashoyan; Llovet	Report

== Competitions ==
=== Overview ===
Competition	First match	Last match	Starting round	Final position	Record							
Competition	First match	Last match	Starting round	Final position	Pld	W	D	L	GF	GA	GD	Win %
Premier League	2 August 2025	27 May 2026	Matchday 1	5th	27	14	7	6	43	26	+17	51.85
Armenian Cup	28 October 2025	14 May 2026	Round of 16	Runnersup	6	3	1	2	13	8	+5	50.00
UEFA Conference League	10 July 2025	17 July 2025	First qualifying round	First qualifying round	2	0	0	2	1	6	−5	0.00
Total					35	17	8	10	57	40	+17	48.57

Last updated: 27 May 2026
Source: Competitions

=== Premier League ===
==== Results summary ====
Overall								Home						Away					
Pld	W	D	L	GF	GA	GD	Pts	W	D	L	GF	GA	GD	W	D	L	GF	GA	GD
27	14	7	6	44	26	+18	49	6	2	5	26	18	+8	8	5	1	18	8	+10

Last updated: 27 May 2026.
Source: See Results

==== Results by round ====
Round	1	2	3	4	5	6	7	8	9	10	11	12	13	14	15	17	18	19	20	21	22	23	16	24	25	26	27
Ground	A	H	A	H	A	H	H	A	H	A	H	A	A	H	A	A	H	A	H	A	H	A	H	H	A	A	H
Result	D	W	W	D	W	L	W	W	D	D	W	W	D	D	W	D	W	W	W	W	L	L	W	L	W	D	L
Position	6	1	1	2	1	3	2	3	4	4	3	3	3	3	2	4	3	3	3	2	2	2	2	2	4	5	5

Updated to match(es) played on 27 May 2026. Source: See Results
A = Away; H = Home; W = Win; D = Draw; L = Loss; P = Bye

==== Results ====
2 August 2025 1	BKMA Yerevan	1–1	Urartu	Yerevan
19:00 (UTC+4)	Askaryan (yellow card) 21'; A.Petrosyan (yellow card) 21'; Hovhannisyan 67'; G.Petrosyan (yellow card) 90+3'	Report	Michel 12'	Stadium: Yerevan Football Academy Stadium; Referee: Ashot Harutyunyan

9 August 2025 2	Urartu	1–0	Gandzasar Kapan	Yerevan
19:30 (UTC+4)	Michel (yellow card) 45+1'; Ghazaryan (yellow card) 54' (goal) 81'	Report	Voskanyan (yellow card) 45+1'; Emmanuel (yellow card) 59'	Stadium: Urartu Stadium; Referee: Artem Gasparyan

15 August 2025 3	Van	0–2	Urartu	Charentsavan
17:00 (UTC+4)		Report	Vardanyan 14'; Piloyan 80'; Ghazaryan (yellow card) 87'; Llovet (yellow card) 90+5'	Stadium: City Stadium; Referee: Zaven Hovhannisyan

22 August 2025 4	Urartu	0–1	Alashkert	Yerevan
20:00 (UTC+4)	Agasaryan (yellow card) 14'; Tsymbalyuk (yellow card) 59'	Report	Nalbandyan (yellow card) 28'; Piloyan 58'; Klaidher (yellow card) 79'	Stadium: Urartu Stadium; Referee: Henrik Nalbandian

29 August 2025 5	Pyunik	1–2	Urartu	Abovyan
19:00 (UTC+4)	Agbalyan (yellow card) 14'; Miljković (yellow card) 57'; Moreno 58'	Report	Polyakov 3' (yellow card) 41'; Agasaryan (yellow card) 47'; Mkrtchyan (yellow card) 80'; Gunko 90+2'	Stadium: Vahagn Tumasyan Stadium; Referee: Artem Gasparyan

14 September 2025 6	Urartu	2–3	Ararat-Armenia	Yerevan
19:00 (UTC+4)	Vardanyan (yellow card) 40'; Michel 74' (pen.), 86' (pen.); Israelyan (yellow card) 89'	Report	Balanta 19'; Bueno (yellow card) 30'; Eloyan (yellow card) 45+1'; Muradyan (yellow card) 46'; Shaghoyan 69'; Oliveira (yellow card) 76'; Margaryan 79' (o.g.); Welton (yellow card) 90+2'	Stadium: Urartu Stadium; Referee: Zaven Hovhannisyan

19 September 2025 7	Urartu	6–0	Ararat Yerevan	Yerevan
19:00 (UTC+4)	Michel 11', 46', 53', 81'; Agasaryan (yellow card) 45+1'; Gunko 69'; Kaloukian 78'	Report	Moustapha (yellow card) 15'; Meite (yellow card) 33'; Handzongo (yellow card) 37'; Samsonyan (yellow card) 86'	Stadium: Urartu Stadium; Referee: Hovhannes Kalantaryan

26 September 2025 8	Shirak	0–1	Urartu	Gyumri
19:00 (UTC+4)	Mnatsakanyan (yellow card) 1'; Mkrtchyan (yellow card) 45'; Akulyan (yellow card) 53'; Vidić (yellow card) 77'	Report	Agasaryan (yellow card) 7'; Michel 73'; Llovet (yellow card) 87'; Erik Piloyan (yellow card) 89'	Stadium: City Stadium; Referee: Ashot Harutyunyan

5 October 2025 9	Urartu	0–0	Noah	Yerevan
20:00 (UTC+4)	Tsymbalyuk (yellow card) 28'; Piloyan (yellow card) 43'; Margaryan (yellow card) 85'; Vardanyan (yellow card) 87'	Report	Eteki (yellow card) 40'; Saintini (yellow card) 90+2'	Stadium: Urartu Stadium; Referee: Artem Gasparyan

18 October 2025 10	Noah	0–0	Urartu	Abovyan
19:00 (UTC+4)	Eteki (yellow card) 51'; Sualehe (yellow card) 74'	Report	Ghazaryan (yellow card) 27'; Piloyan (yellow card) 43'; Michel (yellow card) 85'	Stadium: Vahagn Tumasyan Stadium; Referee: Ashot Ghaltakhchyan

24 October 2025 11	Urartu	5–0	Shirak	Yerevan
19:00 (UTC+4)	Michel 12', 62'; Agasaryan 36'; Piloyan 42'; Melkonyan (yellow card) 75' (goal) 79'	Report	Mkrtchyan (yellow card) 44'	Stadium: Urartu Stadium; Referee: Vardan Manukyan

3 November 2025 12	Ararat Yerevan	0–1	Urartu	Yerevan
19:00 (UTC+4)	Moustapha (yellow card) 18'; Khachumyan (yellow card) 57'	Report	Bratkov 14' (yellow card) 36'; Santos (yellow card) 32'; Michel (yellow card) 78'; Tsymbalyuk (yellow card) 90+3'	Stadium: Vazgen Sargsyan Republican Stadium; Referee: Artem Gasparyan

8 November 2025 13	Ararat-Armenia	1–1	Urartu	Yerevan
18:00 (UTC+4)	Lima 37' (pen.); Grigoryan (yellow card) 46'; Hovhannisyan (yellow card) 54'; Bueno (yellow card) 59'; Nersesyan (yellow card) 87'; Welton (yellow card) 89'; Malis (yellow card) 90+2'	Report	Margaryan (yellow card) 14'; Agasaryan (yellow card) 61'; Gunko (yellow card) 83'; Michel 88' (pen.) (yellow card) 90+6'	Stadium: Yerevan Football Academy Stadium; Referee: Zaven Hovhannisyan

21 November 2025 14	Urartu	1–1	Pyunik	Yerevan
19:00 (UTC+4)	Polyakov (yellow card) 13'; Santos (yellow card) 36'; Michel 45'; Kaloukian (yellow card) 63' (red card) 67'; Mishiyev (yellow card) 89'; Ghazaryan (yellow card) 90+4'	Report	Agbalyan (yellow card) 36'; Noubissi (yellow card) 53'; Miljković (yellow card) 57'; Hovhannisyan (yellow card) 90+2'; Vakulenko 90+5'	Stadium: Urartu Stadium; Referee: Ashot Harutyunyan

29 November 2025 15	Alashkert	0–2	Urartu	Armavir
15:00 (UTC+4)		Report	Polyakov (yellow card) 15'; Melkonyan 28'; Santos (yellow card) 37'; Michel 44'; Piloyan (yellow card) 47'	Stadium: Hakob Tonoyan Stadium; Referee: Vardan Manukyan

6 March 2026 17	Gandzasar Kapan	2–2	Urartu	Yerevan
17:00 (UTC+4)	Kanda 6'; Mani (yellow card) 8'; Ahouangbo 12' (yellow card) 45+2'; Emmanuel (yellow card) 39'	Report	Vardanyan (yellow card) 44'; Bratkov 48'; Agasaryan 73' (yellow card) 90+5'	Stadium: Junior Sport Stadium; Referee: Zaven Hovhannisyan

15 March 2026 18	Urartu	4–1	BKMA Yerevan	Yerevan
19:00 (UTC+4)	Michel 10', 51'; Margaryan (yellow card) 46'; Gunko (yellow card) 72'; Kaloukian 80'; Llovet 90+1' (yellow card) 90+1'	Report	Khachatryan (yellow card) 15'; Harutyunyan 90'	Stadium: Urartu Stadium; Referee: Sargis Khachatryan

20 March 2026 19	BKMA Yerevan	0–1	Urartu	Yerevan
19:00 (UTC+4)	Manukyan (yellow card) 46'; Kirakosyan (yellow card) 90+2'	Report	Michel 54'; Mkrtchyan (yellow card) 56'; Mishiyev (yellow card) 90+2'	Stadium: Yerevan Football Academy Stadium; Referee: Ashot Harutyunyan

5 April 2026 20	Urartu	4–2	Gandzasar Kapan	Yerevan
19:00 (UTC+4)	Velosa 14', 31', 76'; Obonde 27' (o.g.); Piloyan (yellow card) 82'; Llovet (yellow card) 90+1'	Report	Mensah 10'; Ahouangbo (yellow card) 17'; Avetisyan (yellow card) 20'; Obonde (yellow card) 70'; Nóbrega 87'	Stadium: Urartu Stadium; Referee: Ashot Ghaltakhchyan

10 April 2026 21	Van	1–2	Urartu	Charentsavan
15:30 (UTC+4)	Reis (yellow card) 56'; Hovhannisyan 65'	Report	Ghazaryan (yellow card) 36'; Michel 46', 57' (pen.); Kaloukian (yellow card) 64'; Margaryan (yellow card) 80'; Melkonyan (yellow card) 90'	Stadium: City Stadium; Referee: Sargis Khachatryan

19 April 2026 22	Urartu	1–3	Alashkert	Yerevan
19:00 (UTC+4)	Mishiyev (red card) 41'; Velosa 45+2'; Er.Piloyan (yellow card) 69'; Agasaryan (yellow card) 85' (yellow-red card) 90+4'; Santos (yellow card) 88'; Tsymbalyuk (yellow card) 90+7'	Report	Nalbandyan 10' (pen.), 59'; Klaidher (yellow card) 45'; Ed.Piloyan (yellow card) 90+5'; Granado 90+9'	Stadium: Urartu Stadium; Referee: Henrik Nalbandian

23 April 2026 23	Pyunik	2–1	Urartu	Yerevan
18:00 (UTC+4)	Yansané 4'; Islamović (yellow card) 11'; Vakulenko 64'	Report	Velosa (yellow card) 33'; Melkonyan (yellow card) 41'; Kaloukian 90+2' (pen.)	Stadium: Academy Stadium; Referee: Artem Gasparyan

26 April 2026 16	Urartu	2–0	Van	Yerevan
18:00 (UTC+4)	Kaloukian 11'; Ghazaryan (yellow card) 25'; Polyakov 29'	Report	Sidamonidze (yellow card) 18'; Maduka (yellow card) 32'	Stadium: Urartu Stadium; Referee: Hovhannes Kalantaryan
Note: Match originally scheduled for, and postponed on, 27 February due to adverse weather conditions.

3 May 2026 24	Urartu	0–2	Ararat-Armenia	Yerevan
19:00 (UTC+4)	Velosa (yellow card) 42'; Mkrtchyan (yellow card) 70'; Michel (yellow card) 90+3'	Report	Hovhannisyan (yellow card) 24'; Grigoryan (yellow card) 47'; Ambartsumyan (yellow card) 55'; Serobyan (yellow card) 63'; Ndour 72', 90+4'; Queirós (yellow card) 84'; Nersesyan (yellow card) 90+5'	Stadium: Urartu Stadium; Referee: Ashot Harutyunyan

10 May 2026 25	Ararat Yerevan	0–1	Urartu	Yerevan
16:00 (UTC+4)	Kante (yellow card) 45+3'; Lima (yellow card) 54'; Dombila (yellow card) 83'; Ukadike (yellow card) 83'; Meite (yellow card) 85'	Report	Ayvazyan 61'; Piloyan (yellow card) 84'	Stadium: Republican Stadium; Referee: Yura Mahtesyan

18 May 2026 26	Shirak	0–0	Urartu	Gyumri
17:00 (UTC+4)		Report	Piloyan (yellow card) 54'	Stadium: City Stadium; Referee: Artem Gasparyan

27 May 2026 27	Urartu	0–5	Noah	Yerevan
19:00 (UTC+4)		Report	Manvelyan 2'; Saintini 5'; Khamoyan 59'; Jakoliš 75'; Sangaré 78'	Stadium: Urartu Stadium; Referee: Zaven Hovhannisyan

==== League table ====
Pos	Team	Pld	W	D	L	GF	GA	GD	Pts	Qualification or relegation
1	Ararat-Armenia (C)	27	18	6	3	50	25	+25	60	Qualification for the Champions League first qualifying round
2	Noah	27	16	8	3	61	19	+42	56	Qualification for the Conference League second qualifying round (Note: The 2025–26 Armenian Cup winners (Noah) qualify for the Conference League second qualifying round.)
3	Pyunik	27	17	4	6	37	18	+19	55	Qualification for the Conference League first qualifying round
4	Alashkert	27	16	5	6	42	23	+19	53	Qualification for the Conference League first qualifying round
5	Urartu	27	14	7	6	43	26	+17	49	
6	Van	27	9	4	14	27	40	−13	31	
7	BKMA	27	4	11	12	30	42	−12	23	
8	Gandzasar Kapan	27	5	6	16	20	41	−21	21	
9	Ararat Yerevan	27	3	4	20	21	63	−42	13 (Note: Matches won: Ararat 3, Shirak 2)	
10	Shirak	27	2	7	18	17	51	−34	13	

Source: FFA
Rules for classification: 1) Points; 2) Head-to-head points; 3) Head-to-head goal difference; 4) Head-to-head goals scored; 5) Matches won; 6) Goal difference; 7) Less red cards; 8) Less yellow cards; 9) Fair-play ranking 10) Draw
(C) Champions

=== Armenian Cup ===
28 October 2025 Round of 16	Urartu	4–0	Van	Yerevan
19:00 (UTC+4)	Mkrtchyan (yellow card) 11'; Vardanyan 45+1'; Polyakov 52'; Agasaryan (yellow card) 54'; Santos (yellow card) 72'; Melkonyan 81', 88'	Report	Mkoyan (yellow card) 43'	Stadium: Urartu Stadium; Referee: Henrik Nalbandian

3 March 2026 Quarter-final 1st leg	Ararat Yerevan	0–3	Urartu	Yerevan
17:00 (UTC+4)	Samsonyan (yellow card) 25'; Kartashyan (yellow card) 56'	Report	Margaryan (yellow card) 44'; Piloyan (yellow card) 46'; Michel (yellow card) 56'; Gunko 81'; Melkonyan 90+1' (pen.); Santos 90+7'	Stadium: Republican Stadium; Referee: Artem Gasparyan

1 April 2026 Quarter-final 2nd leg	Urartu	2–3 (5–3 agg.)	Ararat Yerevan	Yerevan
19:00 (UTC+4)	Llovet 27'; Kaloukian 43'	Report	Lima 25'; Ouattara (yellow card) 55'; Kante 88'; Touré 90+5'	Stadium: Urartu Stadium; Referee: David Mkrtchyan

15 April 2026 Semi-final 1st leg	Andranik	1–1	Urartu	Yerevan
18:00 (UTC+4)	Ndidi 89'	Report	Polyarus 12' (pen.)	Stadium: Junior Sport Stadium; Referee: Zaven Hovhannisyan

29 April 2026 Semi-final 2nd leg	Urartu	1–0 (2–1 agg.)	Andranik	Yerevan
16:00 (UTC+4)	Michel 33' (pen.); Llovet (yellow card) 72'	Report	Palacios (yellow card) 25'; Obi (yellow card) 44'; Traore (yellow card) 70'	Stadium: Urartu Stadium; Referee: Sargis Khachatryan

14 May 2026 Final	Urartu	2–4	Noah	Yerevan
19:00 (UTC+4)	Mirzoyan 10'; Santos (yellow card) 45'; Vardanyan 75'	Report	Ferreira 26'; Jakoliš 45+1', 52'; Saintini 57'	Stadium: Republican Stadium; Referee: Erik Lambrechts

=== UEFA Conference League ===
==== Qualifying rounds ====
10 July 2025 First qualifying round 1st leg	Urartu (Armenia)	1–2	(Belarus) Neman Grodno	Yerevan, Armenia
20:30 (UTC+4)	Piloyan (yellow card) 24'; Kaloukian 68'; Matinyan (yellow card) 90+3' (red card) 90+4'	Report	Suchkow (yellow card) 10' (goal) 49'; Yevdokimov (yellow card) 19'; Savitski (penalty missed) 48' 54'; Zubovich (yellow card) 70'; Nazarenko (yellow card) 75'; Kozlov (yellow card) 90+4'	Stadium: Urartu Stadium; Attendance: 2,700; Referee: Mateo Erceg (Croatia)

17 July 2025 First qualifying round 2nd leg	Neman Grodno (Belarus)	4–0 (6–1 agg.)	(Armenia) Urartu	Győr, Hungary
22:00 (UTC+4)	Suchkow (yellow card) 21'; Savitski 42'; Zubovich 58'; Pushnyakov 82'; Kravtsov 88'	Report	Ayvazyan (yellow card) 57'	Stadium: Ménfői úti Stadion; Attendance: 0 Referee: Miloš Bošković (Montenegro)
Note: Due to the country's involvement in the Russian invasion of Ukraine, Belarusian teams were required to play their home matches at neutral venues and behind closed doors until further notice.

== Squad statistics ==
As of match played 27 May 2026

=== Appearances and goals ===
No.	Pos	Nat	Player	Total		Premier League		Armenian Cup		Conference League	
No.	Pos	Nat	Player	Apps	Goals	Apps	Goals	Apps	Goals	Apps	Goals
1	GK	(Armenia) ARM	Gor Matinyan	8	0	6	0	1	0	1	0
2	MF	(Russia) RUS	Artemi Gunko	23	3	7+10	2	1+3	1	0+2	0
3	DF	(Armenia) ARM	Erik Piloyan	33	2	25+1	2	5	0	1+1	0
4	DF	(Armenia) ARM	Arman Ghazaryan	19	1	13+2	1	4	0	0	0
6	MF	(Brazil) BRA	Alef Santos	21	1	13+3	0	4+1	1	0	0
7	MF	(Armenia) ARM	Sergey Mkrtchyan	30	0	22+3	0	2+2	0	0+1	0
8	MF	(Armenia) ARM	Narek Agasaryan	29	2	20+2	2	4+1	0	2	0
9	FW	(France) FRA	Alexandre Llovet	22	2	3+14	1	2+3	1	0	0
10	MF	(Armenia) ARM	Karen Melkonyan	24	5	5+12	2	1+5	3	0+1	0
11	DF	(Nigeria) NGR	Okezie Ebenezer	4	0	1+3	0	0	0	0	0
14	MF	(Ukraine) UKR	Artem Polyarus	15	1	7+3	0	2+1	1	2	0
18	DF	(Ukraine) UKR	Anton Bratkov	27	2	21+2	2	3	0	1	0
19	DF	(Armenia) ARM	Artur Melikyan	1	0	0+1	0	0	0	0	0
21	FW	(Armenia) ARM	Edik Vardanyan	26	3	13+9	1	2+2	2	0	0
22	MF	(Armenia) ARM	Mikayel Mirzoyan	30	1	16+6	0	3+3	1	1+1	0
23	FW	(Armenia) ARM	Nicholas Kaloukian	28	6	10+11	4	3+2	1	1+1	1
24	MF	(Armenia) ARM	Levon Bashoyan	6	0	0+4	0	2	0	0	0
27	FW	(Portugal) POR	Miguel Velosa	14	4	10+1	4	1+2	0	0	0
30	MF	(Brazil) BRA	Bruno Michel	31	19	23+2	18	4	1	2	0
33	GK	(Montenegro) MNE	Andrija Dragojević	4	0	1+1	0	1	0	1	0
34	MF	(Armenia) ARM	Vahe Hovhannisyan	1	0	0	0	0+1	0	0	0
44	DF	(Ukraine) UKR	Yevhen Tsymbalyuk	24	0	19	0	3	0	2	0
53	MF	(Armenia) ARM	Davit Harutyunyan	10	0	1+7	0	0	0	0+2	0
55	DF	(Armenia) ARM	Erik Simonyan	6	0	1+2	0	2	0	1	0
77	MF	(Armenia) ARM	Artur Israelyan	4	0	0+2	0	1+1	0	0	0
88	DF	(Armenia) ARM	Zhirayr Margaryan	33	0	26	0	5	0	2	0
90	MF	(Russia) RUS	Oleg Polyakov	23	3	9+9	2	4	1	1	0
92	GK	(Russia) RUS	Aleksandr Mishiyev	24	0	20	0	4	0	0	0
99	DF	(Armenia) ARM	Khariton Ayvazyan	18	1	5+9	1	2+1	0	1	0
Players away on loan:
Players who left Urartu during the season:
9	MF	(Russia) RUS	Maksim Paliyenko	3	0	0+1	0	0	0	2	0
11	FW	(Russia) RUS	Vladislav Yakovlev	2	0	0	0	0	0	1+1	0

=== Goal scorers ===
Place	Position	Nation	Number	Name	Premier League	Armenian Cup	Conference League	Total
1	MF	(Brazil)	30	Bruno Michel	18	1	0	19
2	FW	(Armenia)	23	Nicholas Kaloukian	4	1	1	6
3	MF	(Armenia)	10	Karen Melkonyan	2	3	0	5
4	FW	(Portugal)	27	Miguel Velosa	4	0	0	4
5	MF	(Russia)	2	Artemi Gunko	2	1	0	3
5	MF	(Russia)	90	Oleg Polyakov	2	1	0	3
5	FW	(Armenia)	21	Edik Vardanyan	1	2	0	3
8	DF	(Armenia)	3	Erik Piloyan	2	0	0	2
8	DF	(Ukraine)	18	Anton Bratkov	2	0	0	2
8	MF	(Armenia)	8	Narek Agasaryan	2	0	0	2
8	FW	(France)	9	Alexandre Llovet	1	1	0	2
12	DF	(Armenia)	4	Arman Ghazaryan	1	0	0	1
12	DF	(Armenia)	99	Khariton Ayvazyan	1	0	0	1
12	MF	(Brazil)	6	Alef Santos	0	1	0	1
12	MF	(Ukraine)	14	Artem Polyarus	0	1	0	1
12	MF	(Armenia)	22	Mikayel Mirzoyan	0	1	0	1
12				Own goal	1	0	0	1
				TOTALS	43	13	1	57

=== Clean sheets ===
Place	Position	Nation	Number	Name	Premier League	Armenian Cup	Conference League	Total
1	GK	(Russia)	92	Aleksandr Mishiyev	11	3	0	14
2	GK	(Armenia)	1	Gor Matinyan	2	0	0	2
				TOTALS	13	3	0	16

=== Disciplinary record ===
Number	Nation	Position	Name	Premier League		Armenian Cup		Conference League		Total	
Number	Nation	Position	Name	Yellow card	Red card	Yellow card	Red card	Yellow card	Red card	Yellow card	Red card
1	(Armenia)	GK	Gor Matinyan	0	0	0	0	1	1	1	1
2	(Russia)	MF	Artemi Gunko	2	0	0	0	0	0	2	0
3	(Armenia)	DF	Erik Piloyan	7	0	1	0	1	0	9	0
4	(Armenia)	DF	Arman Ghazaryan	6	0	0	0	0	0	6	0
6	(Brazil)	MF	Alef Santos	4	0	2	0	0	0	6	0
7	(Armenia)	MF	Sergey Mkrtchyan	4	0	1	0	0	0	5	0
8	(Armenia)	MF	Narek Agasaryan	8	1	1	0	0	0	9	1
9	(France)	FW	Alexandre Llovet	4	0	1	0	0	0	5	0
10	(Armenia)	MF	Karen Melkonyan	3	0	0	0	0	0	3	0
18	(Ukraine)	DF	Anton Bratkov	1	0	0	0	0	0	1	0
21	(Armenia)	FW	Edik Vardanyan	3	0	0	0	0	0	3	0
23	(Armenia)	FW	Nicholas Kaloukian	2	1	0	0	0	0	2	1
27	(Portugal)	FW	Miguel Velosa	2	0	0	0	0	0	2	0
30	(Brazil)	MF	Bruno Michel	5	0	1	0	0	0	6	0
44	(Ukraine)	DF	Yevhen Tsymbalyuk	4	0	0	0	0	0	4	0
77	(Armenia)	MF	Artur Israelyan	1	0	0	0	0	0	1	0
88	(Armenia)	DF	Zhirayr Margaryan	4	0	1	0	0	0	5	0
90	(Russia)	MF	Oleg Polyakov	3	0	0	0	0	0	3	0
92	(Russia)	GK	Aleksandr Mishiyev	2	1	0	0	0	0	2	1
99	(Armenia)	DF	Khariton Ayvazyan	0	0	0	0	1	0	1	0
Players away on loan:
Players who left Urartu during the season:
			TOTALS	65	3	8	0	3	1	76	4
