= 2024–25 FC Urartu season =

Urartu
2024–25 season
- CEO: Artur Sahakyan
- Manager: Dmitri Gunko
- Stadium: Urartu Stadium
- Premier League: 3rd
- Armenian Cup: Quarterfinals
- UEFA Europa Conference League: Second qualifying round
- Top goalscorer: League: Ivan Ignatyev (13); All: Ivan Ignatyev (13)
Home colours	Away colours

The 2024–25 season was FC Urartu's twenty-fourth consecutive season in the Armenian Premier League.

== Season overview ==
On 18 June, Urartu announced the signing of Artem Polyarus from Zagłębie Sosnowiec.

On 21 June, Urartu announced the signing of Anton Kilin from Akron Tolyatti.

On 28 June, Urartu announced the signing of Ayoub Abou from Pirin Blagoevgrad.

On 29 June, Urartu announced the signing of Ivan Ignatyev from Železničar Pančevo.

On 3 August, Urartu announced the signing of Gor Matinyan from BKMA Yerevan.

On 19 January, Urartu announced the signing of Bruno Michel from Figueirense and Maksim Paliyenko from Akron Tolyatti.

On 20 January, Urartu announced the signing of Alef Santos from Dinamo Batumi.

On 6 February, Urartu announced that Ivan Ignatyev had left the club to sign for JS Kabylie.

On 19 February, Urartu announced the signing of Dmitry Tikhy from Pari NN.

On 21 February, Urartu announced the signing of Nicholas Kaloukian from Syracuse Orange, and the loan signing of Vladislav Yakovlev from CSKA Moscow until the end of season.

On 23 February, Urartu announced the signing of Artemi Gunko from Kosmos Dolgoprudny.

== Squad ==
As of match played 28 May 2025

Number	Name	Nationality	Position	Date of birth (age)	Signed from	Signed in	Contract ends	Apps.	Goals
Goalkeepers
1	Gor Matinyan	(Armenia)	GK	23 June 2004 (aged 20)	BKMA Yerevan	2024		8	0
42	Aleksandr Melikhov	(Russia)	GK	23 March 1998 (aged 27)	Akhmat Grozny	2022		82	0
92	Aleksandr Mishiyev	(Russia)	GK	29 January 2004 (aged 21)	Mashuk-KMV Pyatigorsk	2023		2	0
Defenders
3	Erik Piloyan	(Armenia)	DF	29 January 2001 (aged 24)	Academy	2019		77	3
4	Arman Ghazaryan	(Armenia)	DF	24 July 2001 (aged 23)	Academy	2019		75	3
5	Aleksandr Putsko	(Russia)	DF	24 February 1993 (aged 32)	Unattached	2024		30	3
16	Barry Isaac	(Nigeria)	DF	21 August 2001 (aged 23)	Right2Win SA	2022		18	0
19	Artur Melikyan	(Armenia)	DF	30 June 2002 (aged 22)	Academy	2020		2	0
33	Alik Mkrtchyan	(Armenia)	DF	31 August 2004 (aged 20)	Academy	2023		1	0
55	Erik Simonyan	(Armenia)	DF	12 June 2003 (aged 21)	Academy	2019		39	3
60	Dmitry Tikhy	(Russia)	DF	29 October 1992 (aged 32)	Pari NN	2025		10	1
88	Zhirayr Margaryan	(Armenia)	DF	13 September 1997 (aged 27)	Veres Rivne	2022		129	5
99	Khariton Ayvazyan	(Armenia)	DF	8 November 2003 (aged 21)	Academy	2020		59	2
Midfielders
2	Artemi Gunko	(Russia)	MF	6 April 2004 (aged 21)	Kosmos Dolgoprudny	2025		9	2
6	Alef Santos	(Brazil)	MF	6 November 1996 (aged 28)	Dinamo Batumi	2025		12	0
7	Sergey Mkrtchyan	(Armenia)	MF	26 June 2001 (aged 23)	Academy	2021		60	3
8	Narek Agasaryan	(Armenia)	MF	15 July 2001 (aged 23)	Academy	2021		111	5
9	Maksim Paliyenko	(Russia)	MF	18 October 1994 (aged 30)	Akron Tolyatti	2025		12	0
14	Artem Polyarus	(Ukraine)	MF	5 July 1992 (aged 32)	Zagłębie Sosnowiec	2024		35	4
22	Mikayel Mirzoyan	(Armenia)	MF	6 February 2001 (aged 24)	BKMA Yerevan	2023		36	5
30	Bruno Michel	(Brazil)	MF	1 June 1999 (aged 25)	Figueirense	2025		14	6
53	Davit Harutyunyan	(Armenia)	MF	2 August 2007 (aged 17)	Academy	2024		11	0
90	Oleg Polyakov	(Russia)	MF	29 November 1990 (aged 34)	Armavir	2020		127	9
Forwards
10	Karen Melkonyan	(Armenia)	FW	25 March 1999 (aged 26)	Academy	2017		193	26
11	Vladislav Yakovlev	(Russia)	FW	14 February 2002 (aged 23)	on loan from CSKA Moscow	2025	2025	7	2
18	Anton Kilin	(Russia)	FW	14 November 1990 (aged 34)	Akron Tolyatti	2024		16	2
23	Nicholas Kaloukian	(Armenia)	FW	18 February 2003 (aged 22)	Syracuse Orange	2025		12	1
77	Edgar Movsesyan	(Armenia)	FW	9 September 1998 (aged 26)	Noah	2024		31	5
Players away on loan
51	David Ghiasyan	(Armenia)	MF	21 April 2006 (aged 19)	Academy	2023		1	0
91	Hayk Ghazaryan	(Armenia)	GK	19 September 2006 (aged 18)	Academy	2022		5	0
	Garnik Minasyan	(Armenia)	MF	12 July 2005 (aged 19)	Academy	2023		1	0
	Levon Bashoyan	(Armenia)	MF	15 September 2005 (aged 19)	Academy	2022		3	0
	Artur Israelyan	(Armenia)	MF	16 January 2004 (aged 21)	Academy	2022		1	0
	Hamlet Sargsyan	(Armenia)	MF	20 May 2004 (aged 21)	Academy	2022		1	0
	Edik Vardanyan	(Armenia)	FW	25 March 2005 (aged 20)	Academy	2022		1	0
Players who left during the season
6	Luqman Gilmore	(Nigeria)	MF	10 May 1996 (aged 29)	Liepāja	2024		29	2
9	Leon Sabua	(Russia)	FW	1 September 2000 (aged 24)	Krasnodar	2022		53	11
11	Gevorg Tarakhchyan	(Armenia)	FW	15 March 2002 (aged 23)	BKMA Yerevan	2023		60	3
12	Mkhitar Umreyan	(Armenia)	GK	23 September 2004 (aged 20)	Academy	2022		0	0
21	Andriy Kravchuk	(Ukraine)	MF	26 February 1999 (aged 26)	Unattached	2024		29	4
34	Ayoub Abou	(Morocco)	MF	28 June 1998 (aged 26)	Pirin Blagoevgrad	2024		19	0
85	Ivan Ignatyev	(Russia)	FW	6 January 1999 (aged 26)	Železničar Pančevo	2024		19	13

== Transfers ==
=== In ===
Date	Position	Nationality	Name	From	Fee	Ref.
18 June 2024	MF	(Ukraine)	Artem Polyarus	Zagłębie Sosnowiec	Undisclosed	
21 June 2024	FW	(Russia)	Anton Kilin	Akron Tolyatti	Undisclosed	
28 June 2024	MF	(Morocco)	Ayoub Abou	Pirin Blagoevgrad	Undisclosed	
29 June 2024	FW	(Russia)	Ivan Ignatyev	Železničar Pančevo	Undisclosed	
1 July 2024	FW	(Armenia)	Edgar Movsesyan	Noah	Undisclosed	
3 August 2024	FW	(Armenia)	Gor Matinyan	BKMA Yerevan	Undisclosed	
19 January 2025	MF	(Brazil)	Bruno Michel	Figueirense	Undisclosed	
19 January 2025	MF	(Russia)	Maksim Paliyenko	Akron Tolyatti	Undisclosed	
20 January 2025	MF	(Brazil)	Alef Santos	Dinamo Batumi	Undisclosed	
19 February 2025	DF	(Russia)	Dmitry Tikhy	Pari NN	Undisclosed	
21 February 2025	FW	(Armenia)	Nicholas Kaloukian	Syracuse Orange	Undisclosed	
23 February 2025	MF	(Russia)	Artemi Gunko	Kosmos Dolgoprudny	Undisclosed	

=== Loans in ===
Date from	Position	Nationality	Name	From	Date to	Ref.
21 February 2025	FW	(Russia)	Vladislav Yakovlev	CSKA Moscow	End of season	

=== Out ===
Date	Position	Nationality	Name	To	Fee	Ref.
31 May 2024	GK	(Armenia)	Gor Lulukyan	Ararat Yerevan	Undisclosed	
6 February 2025	FW	(Russia)	Ivan Ignatyev	JS Kabylie	Undisclosed	
11 February 2025	MF	(Morocco)	Ayoub Abou	Sutjeska Nikšić	Undisclosed	

=== Loans out ===
Date from	Position	Nationality	Name	To	Date to	Ref.
9 August 2024	DF	(Armenia)	Ruben Abrahamyan	BKMA Yerevan	31 May 2025	
9 August 2024	MF	(Armenia)	Karen Davtyan	Gandzasar Kapan	31 May 2025	
9 August 2024	MF	(Armenia)	Artur Israelyan	West Armenia	31 May 2025	
9 August 2024	MF	(Armenia)	Hamlet Sargsyan	BKMA Yerevan	31 May 2025	
14 January 2025	GK	(Armenia)	Hayk Ghazaryan	BKMA Yerevan	31 December 2026	

=== Released ===
Date	Position	Nationality	Name	Joined	Date	Ref
3 June 2024	GK	(Russia)	Dmitry Abakumov			
3 June 2024	FW	(Russia)	Aleksandr Dolgov	Yenisey Krasnoyarsk	23 February 2025	
11 June 2024	DF	(Ukraine)	Yevhen Tsymbalyuk	Concordia Chiajna		
21 August 2024	FW	(Argentina)	Álvaro Veliez	Tristán Suárez	21 January 2025	
30 June 2024	DF	(Montenegro)	Periša Pešukić	Arsenal Tivat		
30 June 2024	DF	(Serbia)	Uroš Stojanović	Železničar Pančevo		
30 June 2024	FW	(Russia)	Nikolai Prudnikov	Volgar Astrakhan		
3 January 2025	FW	(Russia)	Leon Sabua	Amkal Moscow	20 February 2025	
9 January 2025	MF	(Nigeria)	Luqman Gilmore	Paide Linnameeskond	28 February 2025	
9 January 2025	MF	(Ukraine)	Andriy Kravchuk	Ethnikos Achna	1 July 2025	
10 January 2025	FW	(Armenia)	Gevorg Tarakhchyan	Alashkert	25 February 2025	

== Friendlies ==
29 January 2025	Urartu	0–2	Akron Tolyatti	Dubai, United Arab Emirates
18:00 (UTC+4)		Report	Bakayev; Đurasović	Stadium: Jabel Ali Stadium

4 February 2025	Urartu	2–1	Navbahor	Dubai, United Arab Emirates
17:00 (UTC+4)	Melikyan; Trialist (penalty missed)	Report	Goal Penalty missed	Stadium: Al Hamriya Sports Club Stadium

11 February 2025	Urartu	4–0	Zhejiang	Dubai, United Arab Emirates
17:00 (UTC+4)		Report

14 February 2025	Urartu	1–0	Elite Falcons	Dubai, United Arab Emirates
11:00 (UTC+4)		Report

14 February 2025	Urartu	3–1	Dinamo Samarqand	Dubai, United Arab Emirates
16:00 (UTC+4)		Report

== Competitions ==
=== Overview ===
Competition	First match	Last match	Starting round	Final position	Record							
Competition	First match	Last match	Starting round	Final position	Pld	W	D	L	GF	GA	GD	Win %
Premier League	5 August 20204	28 May 2025	Matchday 1	3rd	30	19	5	6	64	31	+33	63.33
Armenian Cup	3 October 2024	1 April 2025	Second round	Quarter-finals	5	2	1	2	5	3	+2	40.00
UEFA Conference League	11 July 2024	1 August 2024	First qualifying round	Second qualifying round	2	0	0	2	5	7	−2	0.00
Total					37	21	6	10	74	41	+33	56.76

Last updated: 28 May 2025
Source: Competitions

=== Premier League ===
==== Results summary ====
Overall								Home						Away					
Pld	W	D	L	GF	GA	GD	Pts	W	D	L	GF	GA	GD	W	D	L	GF	GA	GD
30	19	5	6	64	31	+33	62	10	2	3	33	16	+17	9	3	3	31	15	+16

Last updated: 28 May 2025.
Source: See Results

==== Results by round ====
Round	1	2	3	4	5	6	7	8	9	10	11	12	13	14	15	16	17	18	19	20	21	22	23	24	25	26	27	28	29	30	31	32	33
Ground	H	-	H	A	H	A	H	A	H	A	H	A	H	A	H	A	H	A	H	A	-	A	H	-	H	A	A	A	H	A	H	A	H
Result	D	P	W	W	W	W	W	L	W	W	W	D	W	L	W	L	L	W	W	W	P	W	W	P	L	D	W	D	W	W	D	W	L
Position	6	9	5	5	4	3	2	3	2	2	1	1	1	3	2	2	4	3	2	2	2	2	2	2	3	2	2	3	3	3	3	3	3

Updated to match(es) played on 28 May 2025. Source: See Results
A = Away; H = Home; W = Win; D = Draw; L = Loss; P = Bye

==== Results ====
5 August 2024 1	Urartu	0–0	Pyunik	Yerevan
19:00 (UTC+4)	Simonyan (yellow card) 45'; Gilmore (yellow card) 56'; Margaryan (yellow card) 68'; Isaac (yellow card) 90'	Report	Caraballo (yellow card) 45'; Agdon (yellow card) 45+1'; Davidyan (yellow card) 50'	Stadium: Urartu Stadium; Referee: Ashot Ghaltakhchyan

2	Bye
(UTC+4)

19 August 2024 3	Urartu	3–1	Ararat-Armenia	Yerevan
19:00 (UTC+4)	Putsko 20'; Margaryan (yellow card) 29'; Ignatyev 59', 66'	Report	Noubissi 81'; Pavlovets (yellow card) 90'	Stadium: Urartu Stadium; Referee: Zaven Hovhannisyan

24 August 2024 4	Alashkert	0–3	Urartu	Abovyan
19:00 (UTC+4)	B.Hovhannisyan (yellow card) 35'; Manucharyan (yellow card) 68'; Hovsepyan (yellow card) 71'	Report	Gilmore 44' (yellow card) 47'; Kravchuk (yellow card) 53'; Ignatyev 63'; Melkonyan (yellow card) 74'; Movsesyan 81'; Piloyan (yellow card) 85'	Stadium: City Stadium; Referee: Artem Gasparyan

31 August 2024 5	Urartu	2–0	Gandzasar Kapan	Yerevan
19:00 (UTC+4)	Melkonyan 14', 90+8'; Gilmore (yellow card) 52'	Report	Asilyan (yellow card) 20'	Stadium: Urartu Stadium; Referee: Tiran Yeritsyan

14 September 2024 6	Shirak	0–2	Urartu	Gyumri
18:00 (UTC+4)	Kodia (yellow card) 18'; L.Darbinyan (yellow card) 36'; Urushanyan (yellow card) 45'; Misakyan (yellow card) 45+1'; R.Darbinyan (yellow card) 54'	Report	Ignatyev 15'; Kravchuk (yellow card) 33'; Piloyan (yellow card) 45'; Polyarus (yellow card) 45+1'; Polyakov 79'; Gilmore (yellow card) 86'; Kilin (yellow card) 89'	Stadium: City Stadium; Referee: Henrik Nalbandian

18 September 2024 7	Urartu	3–0	West Armenia	Yerevan
19:00 (UTC+4)	Ignatyev (red card) 4'; Margaryan 16'; Simonyan (yellow card) 72'; Agasaryan (yellow card) 80'	Report	Rudoselsky (yellow card) 4'; Tarasenko 7'; Idris (yellow card) 23'; Granado (yellow card) 24'; Kartashyan (yellow card) 61'; Yusuf 90+7'	Stadium: Urartu Stadium; Referee: David Mkrtchyan
Note: The match original finished as a 2-1 win for West Armenia, however on 30 September, the FFA awarded the match as a 3-0 technical victory to Urartu after West Armenia failed to have at least 3 players training in Armenia on the pitch at the same time.

25 September 2024 8	BKMA Yerevan	2–1	Urartu	Yerevan
18:00 (UTC+4)	Piloyan 27' (o.g.); Petrosyan (yellow card) 63'; K.Hovhannisyan 90+4'	Report	Polyarus 36'; Margaryan (yellow card) 45+2'; S.Mkrtchyan (yellow card) 57' (yellow-red card) 73'	Stadium: Yerevan Football Academy Stadium; Referee: Artem Gasparyan

29 September 2024 9	Urartu	2–1	Noah	Yerevan
19:00 (UTC+4)	Piloyan (yellow card) 38'; Simonyan 45+5'; Gilmore 66'; Melikhov (yellow card) 89'	Report	Pinson (yellow card) 38'; Aiás 59'; Ferreira (yellow card) 72'	Stadium: Urartu Stadium; Referee: Ashot Ghaltakhchyan

6 October 2024 10	Ararat Yerevan	0–1	Urartu	Abovyan
15:00 (UTC+4)	Marcello (yellow card) 30'; Kante (yellow card) 52'; Diabira (yellow card) 57'; Goore (yellow card) 68'	Report	Margaryan (yellow card) 31' (yellow-red card) 83'; Polyakov (yellow card) 36'; Abou (yellow card) 45'; Ignatyev 60' (pen.); Gilmore (yellow card) 66'; Putsko (yellow card) 74'; S.Mkrtchyan (yellow card) 90+6'	Stadium: City Stadium; Referee: Henrik Nalbandian

16 October 2024 11	Urartu	3–1	Van	Yerevan
19:00 (UTC+4)	S.Mkrtchyan 15'; Putsko (yellow card) 25'; Ignatyev 59' (pen.); Piloyan (yellow card) 84'; Polyarus 87'	Report	Klaidher (yellow card) 9'; Touré (yellow card) 28' (yellow-red card) 34'; Okonkwo 42' (yellow card) 90+6'; Gareginyan (yellow card) 42'; Nalbandyan (yellow card) 80'	Stadium: Urartu Stadium; Referee: Vardan Manukyan

21 October 2024 12	West Armenia	2–2	Urartu	Yerevan
19:00 (UTC+4)	Danielyan (yellow card) 20'; Ayunts (yellow card) 45+1' (goal) 53'; Dramé 62'; A.Sargsyan (yellow card) 76'	Report	Ignatyev 14', 90+6'; Abou (yellow card) 33'; Isaac (yellow card) 51'	Stadium: Junior Sport Stadium; Referee: Yura Mahtesyan

26 October 2024 13	Urartu	1–0	Ararat Yerevan	Yerevan
16:00 (UTC+4)	Simonyan 35'	Report	Hadji (yellow card) 50'; Nahapetyan (yellow card) 89'; Dombila (yellow card) 90+6'	Stadium: Urartu Stadium; Referee: Zaven Hovhannisyan

1 November 2024 14	Noah	2–1	Urartu	Abovyan
19:00 (UTC+4)	Oulad Omar 22'; Aiás (yellow card) 51'; Gregório 74'	Report	Simonyan (yellow card) 31'; Ignatyev 45+9'	Stadium: City Stadium; Referee: Hovhannes Kalantaryan

6 November 2024 15	Urartu	4–2	BKMA Yerevan	Yerevan
19:00 (UTC+4)	S.Mkrtchyan 3'; Avetisyan 8' (o.g.); Kravchuk 30'; Margaryan (yellow card) 62'; Melkonyan 90+3'	Report	Hakobyan 78' (pen.); N.Hovhannisyan 90+1'	Stadium: Urartu Stadium; Referee: Artem Gasparyan

11 November 2024 16	Van	3–1	Urartu	Charentsavan
15:00 (UTC+4)	John (yellow card) 5'; Touré 17', 70'; Matyukhin (yellow card) 37'; Akila (yellow card) 78' (goal) 85'; Hakobyan (yellow card) 81'	Report	Kilin 12'; Gilmore (yellow card) 77'	Stadium: City Stadium; Referee: Zaven Hovhannisyan

20 November 2024 17	Urartu	1–2	Shirak	Yerevan
17:00 (UTC+4)	Simonyan (yellow card) 63'; Margaryan (red card) 73'; Ignatyev 80'; Agasaryan (yellow card) 85'	Report	Hakobyan 53', 74' (pen.); Urushanyan (yellow card) 45'; Mnatsakanyan (yellow card) 90+1'; L.Darbinyan (yellow card) 90+3'	Stadium: Urartu Stadium; Referee: Artem Gasparyan

28 November 2024 18	Gandzasar Kapan	0–4	Urartu	Yerevan
14:00 (UTC+4)	Opoku (yellow card) 59'	Report	Melkonyan 52'; Ignatyev 73', 79'; Piloyan 90+6'	Stadium: Junior Sport Stadium; Referee: Ashot Harutyunyan

3 December 2024 19	Urartu	1–0	Alashkert	Yerevan
18:00 (UTC+4)	Ignatyev 90+6'	Report	A.Hovhannisyan (yellow card) 6'; B.Hovhannisyan (yellow card) 55'; Hovsepyan (yellow card) 89'	Stadium: Urartu Stadium; Referee: Artem Gasparyan

25 February 2025 20	Ararat-Armenia	1–2	Urartu	Charentsavan
18:00 (UTC+4)	Muradyan (yellow card) 45'; Harutyunyan (yellow card) 51' (goal) 85'; Grigoryan (yellow card) 84'; Hovhannisyan (yellow card) 87'; Nondi (yellow card) 89'; Ambartsumyan (yellow card) 90+6'	Report	Michel 53' (pen.); Simonyan (yellow card) 57'; Kaloukian 64' (yellow card) 90+4'; Melkonyan (yellow card) 90+6'; Margaryan (yellow card) 90+7'; Putsko (yellow card) 90+8'	Stadium: City Stadium; Referee: Ashot Ghaltakhchyan

21	Bye
(UTC+4)

9 March 2025 22	Pyunik	0–3	Urartu	Yerevan
16:00 (UTC+4)		Report	Santos (yellow card) 37'; Michel 41', 48', 58' (pen.); Tikhy (yellow card) 81'; Ayvazyan (yellow card) 85'; Melikhov (yellow card) 90+6'; S.Mkrtchyan (yellow card) 90+10'	Stadium: Junior Sport Stadium; Referee: Zaven Hovhannisyan

15 March 2025 23	Urartu	2–1	Gandzasar Kapan	Yerevan
15:00 (UTC+4)	Margaryan 49'; Yakovlev 50' (yellow card) 90+6'	Report	Mani 13'; Opoku (yellow card) 39'; Koné (yellow card) 80'; Merrill (yellow card) 86'; Mizyed (yellow card) 89'; Chibuike (yellow card) 90+2'	Stadium: Urartu Stadium; Referee: Artem Gasparyan

24	Bye
(UTC+4)

5 April 2025 25	Urartu	0–3	Ararat-Armenia	Yerevan
19:00 (UTC+4)	Mkrtchyan (yellow card) 33'; Santos (yellow card) 71'; Paliyenko (yellow card) 72'	Report	Noubissi 34' (pen.), 37', 76'; Muradyan (yellow card) 66'	Stadium: Urartu Stadium; Referee: Henrik Nalbandian

11 April 2025 26	Alashkert	1–1	Urartu	Abovyan
16:00 (UTC+4)	Kireyenko (yellow card) 63'; Tikhy 68' (o.g.); Manucharyan (yellow card) 75' (yellow-red card) 84'	Report	Santos (yellow card) 64'; Gunko (yellow card) 82'; Mirzoyan 85'	Stadium: City Stadium; Referee: Sargis Khachatryan

19 April 2025 27	Pyunik	1–4	Urartu	Abovyan
16:00 (UTC+4)	Vareika 5' (yellow card) 75'; Udo (yellow card) 27'; Otubanjo (yellow card) 41'; Vakulenko (yellow card) 45+7'; Agdon (yellow card) 52'	Report	Margaryan (yellow card) 53'; Polyarus 63'; Kovalenko 69' (o.g.); Polyakov (yellow card) 71'; Michel 74'; Agasaryan 90+4'	Stadium: City Stadium; Referee: Ashot Harutyunyan

27 April 2025 28	Shirak	1–1	Urartu	Gyumri
19:00 (UTC+4)	Kodia (yellow card) 62'; Mkrtchyan (yellow card) 66' (goal) 86'	Report	Kaloukian (yellow card) 6'; Agasaryan (yellow card) 80'; Michel 84'	Stadium: City Stadium; Referee: Vardan Manukyan

3 May 2025 29	Urartu	8–0	West Armenia	Yerevan
19:00 (UTC+4)	Melkonyan 4', 30', 56'; Putsko 15', 44'; Agasaryan 24'; Ayvazyan 34'; Gunko 76'	Report	Racines (yellow card) 39'	Stadium: Urartu Stadium; Referee: Ashot Ghaltakhchyan

11 May 2025 30	BKMA Yerevan	0–1	Urartu	Yerevan
15:30 (UTC+4)	Eloyan (yellow card) 3'; D.Hakobyan (yellow card) 15'	Report	Santos (yellow card) 2'; Agasaryan (yellow card) 27'; Piloyan (yellow card) 33'; Melkonyan 50'; Kaloukian (yellow card) 90+3'; Matinyan (yellow card) 90+7'	Stadium: Yerevan Football Academy Stadium; Referee: Henrik Nalbandian

18 May 2025 31	Urartu	3–3	Noah	Yerevan
17:00 (UTC+4)	Melkonyan 9'; Santos (yellow card) 32'; Ayvazyan 43'; Gunko (yellow card) 45+5'; Silva 45+6'; Margaryan (yellow card) 90+4'; Yakovlev (yellow card) 90+4'; Putsko (yellow card) 90+7'	Report	Ferreira 19'; Aiás 26'; Khudaverdyan (yellow card) 42'; Þórarinsson 46'; Silva (yellow card) 81'; Fofana (yellow card) 87'	Stadium: Urartu Stadium; Referee: Ashot Ghaltakhchyan

24 May 2025 32	Ararat Yerevan	2–4	Urartu	Yerevan
16:00 (UTC+4)	Johna 42'; Kante (red card) 70'; Samsonyan (yellow card) 87'; Simonyan (yellow card) 90+2'; Bah 90+4'	Report	Melkonyan 3'; Paliyenko (yellow card) 10'; Gunko 52'; Polyarus 66'; Margaryan (yellow card) 70'; Agasaryan (red card) 70'; Yakovlev 85'	Stadium: Vazgen Sargsyan Republican Stadium; Referee: Vardan Vardumyan

28 May 2025 33	Urartu	0–2	Van	Yerevan
16:00 (UTC+4)	Santos (yellow card) 46'	Report	Okonkwo 4'; Touré (yellow card) 29'; Drammeh 55'	Stadium: Urartu Stadium; Referee: Ashot Harutyunyan

==== League table ====
Pos	Team	Pld	W	D	L	GF	GA	GD	Pts	Qualification or relegation
1	Noah (C)	30	24	3	3	92	20	+72	75	Qualification for the Champions League first qualifying round
2	Ararat-Armenia	30	21	3	6	75	28	+47	66	Qualification for the Conference League second qualifying round (Note: The 2024–25 Armenian Cup winners qualified for the Conference League second qualifying round. Since the cup winners (Noah) qualified based on league position, the Conference League second round spot was passed to the second-placed team, and the second Conference League first round spot was passed to the fourth-placed team.)
3	Urartu	30	19	5	6	64	31	+33	62	Qualification for the Conference League first qualifying round
4	Pyunik	30	17	2	11	59	37	+22	53	Qualification for the Conference League first qualifying round
5	Van	30	15	7	8	56	36	+20	52	
6	BKMA	30	10	6	14	44	54	−10	36	
7	Shirak	30	10	5	15	30	50	−20	35	
8	Ararat Yerevan	30	9	5	16	36	59	−23	32	
9	Alashkert	30	6	8	16	24	52	−28	26	
10	West Armenia (Note: On 7 May 2025, it was announced that West Armenia were on the verge of expulsion after a no show against Ararat-Armenia. On 17 May 2025, they were officially expelled and all games were awarded 3–0 to their opponents.) (D, R)	30	7	2	21	22	78	−56	23	Relegation to the Armenian First League
11	Gandzasar Kapan	30	2	4	24	16	73	−57	10	Spared from relegation

Source: FFA
Rules for classification: 1) Points; 2) Head-to-head points; 3) Head-to-head goal difference; 4) Head-to-head goals scored; 5) Matches won; 6) Goal difference; 7) Less red cards; 8) Less yellow cards; 9) Fair-play ranking 10) Draw
(C) Champions; (D) Disqualified; (R) Relegated

=== Armenian Cup ===
3 October 2024 Second round	BKMA Yerevan	0–4	Urartu	Abovyan
18:00 (UTC+4)	Petrosyan (yellow card) 81'	Report	Movsesyan 7', 51'; Kilin 28'; Ignatyev (yellow card) 31'; Sabua 67'; Ghazaryan (yellow card) 90+4'	Stadium: City Stadium; Referee: Ashot Harutyunyan

5 March 2025 Quarter-final 1st leg	Urartu	0–1	Ararat-Armenia	Charentsavan
16:00 (UTC+4)	Piloyan (yellow card) 28'	Report	Grigoryan (yellow card) 14'; Ambartsumyan (yellow card) 30'; Yenne 48' (pen.); Queirós (yellow card) 66'; Shaghoyan (yellow card) 70'	Stadium: Charentsavan City Stadium; Referee: Hovhannes Kalantaryan

1 April 2025 Quarter-final 2nd leg	Ararat-Armenia	2–1 (3–1 agg.)	Urartu	Yerevan
19:00 (UTC+4)	Grigoryan (yellow card) 4'; Putsko 62' (o.g.); Duarte (yellow card) 90+2'; Tera 90+7'	Report	Polyarus (yellow card) 14'; Tikhy 42'; Santos (yellow card) 58'; Agasaryan (yellow card) 90+6'	Stadium: Yerevan Football Academy Stadium; Referee: Yura Mahtesyan

=== UEFA Conference League ===
==== Qualifying rounds ====
11 July 2024 First qualifying round 1st leg	Tallinna Kalev (Estonia)	1–2	(Armenia) Urartu	Tallinn, Estonia
20:30 (UTC+4)	Teeväli 11'	Report	Movsesyan 28', 77'	Stadium: Kadriorg Stadium; Attendance: 1,217; Referee: Dmytro Kubriak (Ukraine)

18 July 2024 First qualifying round 2nd leg	Urartu (Armenia)	2–0 (4–1 agg.)	(Estonia) Tallinna Kalev	Yerevan, Armenia
19:00 (UTC+4)	Mirzoyan 12', 49'	Report		Stadium: Urartu Stadium; Attendance: 2,200; Referee: Pavle Ilić (Serbia)

25 July 2024 Second qualifying round 1st leg	Baník Ostrava (Czech Republic)	5–1	(Armenia) Urartu	Ostrava, Czech Republic
21:00 (UTC+4)	Ewerton 15'; Boula 22'; Buchta 26'; Prekop 61'; Klíma 82' (pen.)	Report	Tarakhchyan 90+4'	Stadium: Městský stadion Attendance: 13,553; Referee: Mervan Bejtullahu (Kosovo)

1 August 2024 Second qualifying round 2nd leg	Urartu (Armenia)	0–2 (1–7 agg.)	(Czech Republic) Baník Ostrava	Yerevan, Armenia
19:00 (UTC+4)		Report	Ewerton 22'; Chaluš 51'	Stadium: Urartu Stadium; Attendance: 1,700; Referee: Bulat Sariyev (Kazakhstan)

== Squad statistics ==
As of match played 28 May 2025

=== Appearances and goals ===
No.	Pos	Nat	Player	Total		Premier League		Armenian Cup		Conference League	
No.	Pos	Nat	Player	Apps	Goals	Apps	Goals	Apps	Goals	Apps	Goals
1	GK	(Armenia) ARM	Gor Matinyan	8	0	6	0	2	0	0	0
2	MF	(Russia) RUS	Artemi Gunko	9	2	2+5	2	0+2	0	0	0
3	DF	(Armenia) ARM	Erik Piloyan	26	1	18+4	1	2	0	1+1	0
4	DF	(Armenia) ARM	Arman Ghazaryan	9	0	2+2	0	1	0	4	0
5	DF	(Russia) RUS	Aleksandr Putsko	30	3	28	3	2	0	0	0
6	MF	(Brazil) BRA	Alef Santos	11	0	8+1	0	2	0	0	0
7	MF	(Armenia) ARM	Sergey Mkrtchyan	22	2	7+9	2	1+2	0	0+3	0
8	MF	(Armenia) ARM	Narek Agasaryan	35	2	18+10	2	3	0	4	0
9	MF	(Russia) RUS	Maksim Paliyenko	13	0	10+1	0	2	0	0	0
10	FW	(Armenia) ARM	Karen Melkonyan	34	10	18+11	10	0+2	0	1+2	0
11	FW	(Russia) RUS	Vladislav Yakovlev	7	2	1+5	2	0+1	0	0	0
14	MF	(Ukraine) UKR	Artem Polyarus	35	4	28+1	4	2	0	4	0
16	DF	(Nigeria) NGR	Barry Isaac	11	0	4+2	0	1	0	4	0
18	FW	(Russia) RUS	Anton Kilin	16	2	10+5	1	1	1	0	0
19	DF	(Armenia) ARM	Artur Melikyan	2	0	0+1	0	0+1	0	0	0
22	MF	(Armenia) ARM	Mikayel Mirzoyan	14	3	4+6	1	0	0	4	2
23	FW	(Armenia) ARM	Nicholas Kaloukian	12	1	5+5	1	2	0	0	0
30	MF	(Brazil) BRA	Bruno Michel	14	6	12	6	2	0	0	0
42	GK	(Russia) RUS	Aleksandr Melikhov	24	0	23	0	1	0	0	0
53	MF	(Armenia) ARM	Davit Harutyunyan	14	0	0+9	0	0+2	0	0+3	0
55	DF	(Armenia) ARM	Erik Simonyan	25	2	18+1	2	2	0	4	0
60	DF	(Russia) RUS	Dmitry Tikhy	10	1	9	0	1	1	0	0
77	FW	(Armenia) ARM	Edgar Movsesyan	31	5	6+18	1	1+2	2	4	2
88	DF	(Armenia) ARM	Zhirayr Margaryan	32	1	26	1	3	0	3	0
90	MF	(Russia) RUS	Oleg Polyakov	19	1	4+13	1	0+1	0	0+1	0
99	DF	(Armenia) ARM	Khariton Ayvazyan	19	2	9+5	2	0+1	0	2+2	0
Players away on loan:
91	GK	(Armenia) ARM	Hayk Ghazaryan	5	0	1	0	0	0	4	0
Players who left Urartu during the season:
6	MF	(Nigeria) NGR	Luqman Gilmore	19	2	13+2	2	0	0	2+2	0
9	FW	(Russia) RUS	Leon Sabua	10	1	1+8	0	1	1	0	0
11	FW	(Armenia) ARM	Gevorg Tarakhchyan	9	1	0+4	0	0+1	0	0+4	1
21	MF	(Ukraine) UKR	Andriy Kravchuk	13	1	9+4	1	0	0	0	0
34	MF	(Morocco) MAR	Ayoub Abou	19	0	14+1	0	0	0	2+2	0
85	FW	(Russia) RUS	Ivan Ignatyev	19	13	16	13	1	0	1+1	0

=== Goal scorers ===
Place	Position	Nation	Number	Name	Premier League	Armenian Cup	Conference League	Total
1	FW	(Russia)	85	Ivan Ignatyev	13	0	0	13
2	FW	(Armenia)	10	Karen Melkonyan	10	0	0	10
3	MF	(Brazil)	30	Bruno Michel	6	0	0	6
4	FW	(Armenia)	77	Edgar Movsesyan	1	2	2	5
5	MF	(Ukraine)	14	Artem Polyarus	4	0	0	4
6	DF	(Russia)	5	Aleksandr Putsko	3	0	0	3
6	MF	(Armenia)	22	Mikayel Mirzoyan	1	0	2	3
6				Own goal	3	0	0	3
9	MF	(Nigeria)	6	Luqman Gilmore	2	0	0	2
9	DF	(Armenia)	55	Erik Simonyan	2	0	0	2
9	MF	(Armenia)	7	Sergey Mkrtchyan	2	0	0	2
9	MF	(Armenia)	8	Narek Agasaryan	2	0	0	2
9	DF	(Armenia)	99	Khariton Ayvazyan	2	0	0	2
9	MF	(Russia)	2	Artemi Gunko	2	0	0	2
9	FW	(Russia)	11	Vladislav Yakovlev	2	0	0	2
9	MF	(Russia)	18	Anton Kilin	1	1	0	2
17	MF	(Russia)	90	Oleg Polyakov	1	0	0	1
17	MF	(Ukraine)	21	Andriy Kravchuk	1	0	0	1
17	DF	(Armenia)	3	Erik Piloyan	1	0	0	1
17	FW	(Armenia)	23	Nicholas Kaloukian	1	0	0	1
17	DF	(Armenia)	88	Zhirayr Margaryan	1	0	0	1
17	MF	(Russia)	60	Dmitry Tikhy	0	1	0	1
17	FW	(Russia)	9	Leon Sabua	0	0	1	1
17	FW	(Armenia)	11	Gevorg Tarakhchyan	0	0	1	1
				Awarded	3	0	0	3
				TOTALS	64	5	5	74

=== Clean sheets ===
Place	Position	Nation	Number	Name	Premier League	Armenian Cup	Conference League	Total
1	GK	(Russia)	42	Aleksandr Melikhov	9	0	0	9
2	GK	(Armenia)	1	Gor Matinyan	2	1	0	3
3	GK	(Armenia)	91	Hayk Ghazaryan	1	0	1	2
				TOTALS	12	1	1	14

=== Disciplinary record ===
Number	Nation	Position	Name	Premier League		Armenian Cup		Conference League		Total	
Number	Nation	Position	Name	Booked	Sent off (straight red)	Booked	Sent off (straight red)	Booked	Sent off (straight red)	Booked	Sent off (straight red)
1	(Russia)	GK	Gor Matinyan	1	0	0	0	0	0	1	0
2	(Russia)	MF	Artemi Gunko	1	0	0	0	0	0	1	0
3	(Armenia)	DF	Erik Piloyan	5	0	1	0	0	0	6	0
4	(Armenia)	DF	Arman Ghazaryan	0	0	1	0	0	0	1	0
5	(Russia)	DF	Aleksandr Putsko	4	0	0	0	0	0	4	0
6	(Brazil)	MF	Alef Santos	6	0	1	0	0	0	7	0
7	(Armenia)	MF	Sergey Mkrtchyan	5	1	0	0	0	0	5	1
8	(Armenia)	MF	Narek Agasaryan	4	1	1	0	2	0	7	1
9	(Russia)	MF	Maksim Paliyenko	2	0	0	0	0	0	2	0
10	(Armenia)	MF	Karen Melkonyan	2	0	0	0	0	0	2	0
11	(Russia)	FW	Vladislav Yakovlev	2	0	0	0	0	0	2	0
14	(Ukraine)	MF	Artem Polyarus	1	0	1	0	0	0	2	0
16	(Nigeria)	DF	Barry Isaac	2	0	0	0	1	0	3	0
18	(Russia)	FW	Anton Kilin	1	0	0	0	0	0	1	0
22	(Armenia)	MF	Mikayel Mirzoyan	0	0	0	0	1	0	1	0
23	(Armenia)	FW	Nicholas Kaloukian	3	0	0	0	0	0	3	0
42	(Russia)	GK	Aleksandr Melikhov	2	0	0	0	0	0	2	0
55	(Armenia)	DF	Erik Simonyan	5	0	0	0	2	0	7	0
60	(Russia)	DF	Dmitry Tikhy	1	0	0	0	0	0	1	0
88	(Armenia)	DF	Zhirayr Margaryan	10	2	0	0	0	1	10	3
90	(Russia)	MF	Oleg Polyakov	2	0	0	0	0	0	2	0
99	(Russia)	DF	Khariton Ayvazyan	1	0	0	0	0	0	1	0
Players away on loan:
Players who left Urartu during the season:
6	(Nigeria)	MF	Luqman Gilmore	6	0	0	0	1	0	7	0
21	(Ukraine)	MF	Andriy Kravchuk	2	0	0	0	0	0	2	0
34	(Morocco)	MF	Ayoub Abou	2	0	0	0	0	0	2	0
85	(Russia)	FW	Ivan Ignatyev	0	1	1	0	0	0	1	1
			TOTALS	70	5	6	0	7	1	83	6
