= Poštulka =

Poštulka (feminine Poštulková) is a Czech surname. Notable people with the surname include:

- Jan Poštulka (born 1949), Czech football player and coach
- Marek Poštulka (born 1970), Czech footballer
- Tomáš Poštulka (born 1974), Czech footballer
