= 2007 Armenian First League =

Football league season

The 2007 Armenian First League season started on 25 April 2007. The last matches were played on 6 October 2007. Only two teams were eligible for promotion to the Armenian Premier League. Dinamo Yerevan finished fourth and won promotion, but were subsequently disbanded and no team was promoted in their place. The other eligible team, Bentonit Ijevan, only played three matches and withdrew in the middle of May.

== Overview ==
- FC Bentonit Ijevan returned to professional football.

== League table ==
Pos	Team	Pld	W	D	L	GF	GA	GD	Pts	Qualification
1	Pyunik-2	21	14	2	5	54	19	+35	44	Champions
2	Mika-2	21	10	9	2	42	23	+19	39	
3	Ararat-2	21	9	7	5	43	26	+17	34	
4	Dinamo	21	10	3	8	47	38	+9	33	Promoted to Armenian Premier League. Champions were unable to promote.
5	Banants-2	21	8	4	9	35	38	−3	28	
6	Gandzasar-2	21	8	4	9	26	37	−11	28	
7	Shirak-2	21	3	10	8	23	44	−21	19	
8	Patani	21	2	1	18	19	64	−45	7	
9	Bentonit	3	2	0	1	8	4	+4	6	Withdrew after three matches, existing record was annulled.

== Top goalscorers ==
		Player	Team	Goals
1	(Armenia)	Arthur Barseghyan	Dinamo	15
2	(Armenia)	Stepan Hakobyan	Mika-2	14
3	(Armenia)	Sargis Aroyan	Pyunik-2	13
4	(Armenia)	Norayr Gyozalyan	Banants-2	11
5	(Armenia)	Hovhannes Mnatsakanyan	Dinamo	10

== See also ==
- 2007 Armenian Premier League
- 2007 Armenian Cup
