= Vladislav Yakovlev =

Vladislav Yakovlev may refer to:

- Vladislav Yakovlev (rower)
- Vladislav Yakovlev (footballer)
