= Oganes Zanazanyan =

Soviet footballer and coach (1946–2015)

Hovhannes Zanazanyan
Personal information
- Full name: Hovhannes Arutyunovich Zanazanyan
- Date of birth: 10 December 1946
- Place of birth: Athens, Greece
- Date of death: 4 October 2015 (aged 68)
- Place of death: Yerevan, Armenia
- Position: Midfielder

Youth career
- ???? – 1965: Spartak Yerevan

Senior career*
Years	Team	Apps	(Gls)
1965	Lernagorts	38	(11)
1966	Shirak	24	(3)
1966–1975	Ararat Yerevan	243	(56)
1976	Spartak Moscow	4	(0)
1976–1977	FIMA Yerevan		
1978–1979	Karabakh Stepanakert		

International career
1972	USSR	6	(1)

Managerial career
- 1976–1977: FIMA Yerevan
- 1978–1979: Karabakh Stepanakert
- 1992–1993: Homenetmen Beirut
- 1994–1995: Armenia U-21
- 2001–2002: Spartak Yerevan
- 2003–2005: Banants
- * Club domestic league appearances and goals

Hovhannes Arutyunovich Zanazanyan (Armenian: Հովհանես Զանազանյան, Russian: Оганес Арутюнович Заназанян; 10 December 1946 – 4 October 2015) was a Soviet football player and an Armenian coach.

== Honours ==
- Soviet Top League winner: 1973.
- Soviet Cup winner: 1973, 1975.
- Olympic bronze: 1972.

== International career ==
Zanazanyan made his debut for USSR on 28 August 1972 in the Olympics game against Burma.
