= Ayoub Abou =

Moroccan footballer (born 1998)

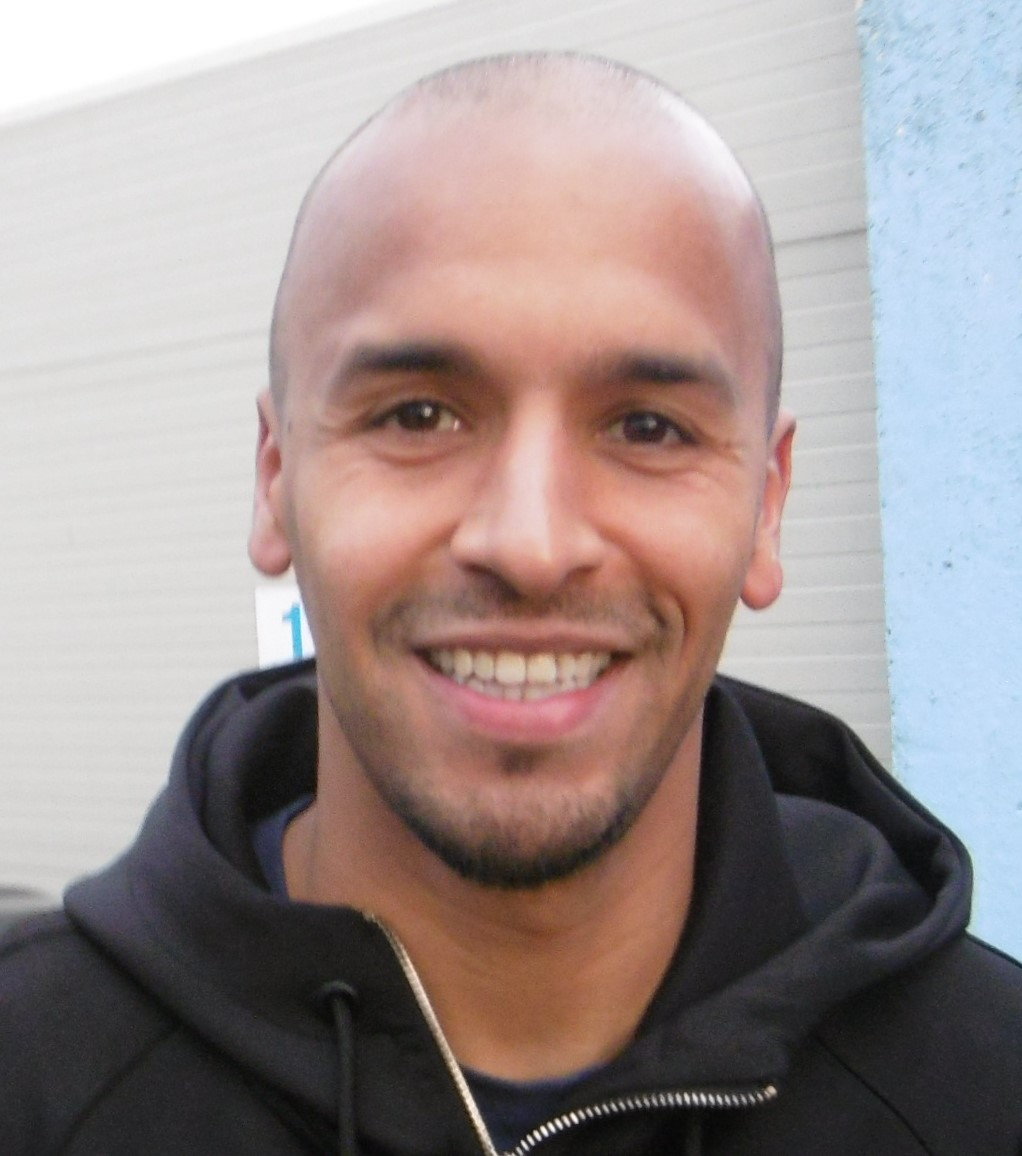

Personal information
- Full name: Ayoub Abou Oulam
- Date of birth: 28 June 1998 (age 28)
- Place of birth: Casablanca, Morocco
- Height: 1.76 m (5 ft 9 1/2 in)
- Position: Midfielder

Team information
- Current team: CSA Steaua București
- Number: 21

Youth career
- 2007–2015: Barcelona
- 2015–2017: Porto

Senior career*
Years	Team	Apps	(Gls)
2017–2018	Rayo Majadahonda	31	(2)
2018	Getafe	0	(0)
2018–2021	Real Madrid B	26	(2)
2020–2021	→ Rayo Majadahonda (loan)	18	(0)
2021–2023	SPAL	0	(0)
2022	→ Tsarsko Selo (loan)	12	(0)
2023–2024	Pirin Blagoevgrad	33	(0)
2024–2025	Urartu	15	(0)
2025	Sutjeska Nikšić	3	(0)
2025	Feirense	1	(0)
2026	Septemvri Sofia	16	(0)
2026–	CSA Steaua București	4	(0)
- * Club domestic league appearances and goals as of 30 October 2026

Ayoub Abou Oulam (Arabic: أيوب أبو عولم بطاس; born 28 June 1998) is a Moroccan professional footballer who plays as a midfielder for Liga II club CSA Steaua București.

== Career ==
Abou was born in Casablanca but moved to Barcelona at the age of nine. He subsequently joined FC Barcelona's La Masia, but moved to FC Porto in July 2015, being initially assigned to the under-20 squad.

On 30 August 2017, Abou joined Segunda División B side CF Rayo Majadahonda. He made his senior debut on 10 September, starting in a 0–4 away loss against SD Ponferradina.

Abou scored his first senior goal on 15 October 2017, netting the second in a 2–0 home win against Pontevedra CF. He finished the campaign with two goals in 31 matches, as his side achieved a first-ever promotion to Segunda División.

In 2018, Abou signed for Spanish third-tier club Real Madrid Castilla. In 2021, Abou signed for SPAL in the Italian second tier. Before the second half of 2021–22, he was sent on loan to Bulgarian team Tsarsko Selo. On 20 February 2022, he made his debut in a 1–2 loss to Beroe.

== Honours ==
Rayo Majadahonda

- Segunda División B: 2017–18
