= Vladislav Yakovlev (footballer) =

Russian football player (born 2002)

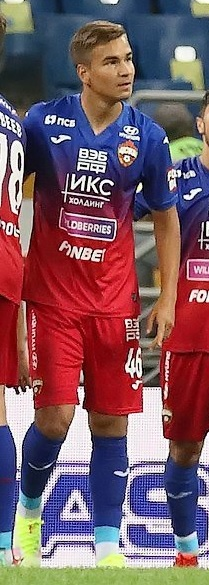
- Yakovlev with CSKA Moscow in 2021

Personal information
- Full name: Vladislav Gennadyevich Yakovlev
- Date of birth: 14 February 2002 (age 24)
- Place of birth: Moscow, Russia
- Height: 1.87 m (6 ft 2 in)
- Position: Forward

Team information
- Current team: Volga Ulyanovsk
- Number: 14

Youth career
- 2008–2022: CSKA Moscow

Senior career*
Years	Team	Apps	(Gls)
2021–2025	CSKA Moscow	28	(1)
2023	→ Pari NN (loan)	11	(1)
2023–2024	→ Khimki (loan)	7	(2)
2025	→ Urartu (loan)	6	(2)
2025–	Volga Ulyanovsk	24	(4)

International career^{‡}
2022	Russia U21	3	(1)
- * Club domestic league appearances and goals as of 16 May 2026 ‡ National team caps and goals as of 16 November 2022

Vladislav Gennadyevich Yakovlev (Russian: Владислав Геннадьевич Яковлев; born 14 February 2002) is a Russian football player who plays as a striker for Russian club Volga Ulyanovsk.

== Club career ==
He joined the academy of CSKA Moscow at the age of 6.

He made his debut in the Russian Premier League for CSKA Moscow on 12 April 2021 in a game against Rotor Volgograd. He scored his first RPL goal for CSKA on 21 August 2021 against Akhmat Grozny.

On 8 June 2022, Yakovlev signed a new contract with CSKA until 2025.

On 7 January 2023, Yakovlev moved on loan to Pari NN until the end of the 2022–23 season, with an option to buy.

On 26 July 2023, Yakovlev extended his contract with CSKA until the end of the 2025–26 season and joined Khimki on a season-long loan with an option to buy.

On 21 February 2025, Yakovlev was loaned by Urartu in Armenia. On 1 August 2025, Urartu announced the early termination of Yakovlev's loan deal with the club.

On 29 August 2025, Yakovlev signed with Volga Ulyanovsk.

== Career statistics ==
As of match played 16 May 2026

Club	Season	League			Cup		Continental		Other		Total	
Club	Season	Division	Apps	Goals	Apps	Goals	Apps	Goals	Apps	Goals	Apps	Goals
CSKA Moscow	2020–21	Russian Premier League	2	0	0	0	–		–		2	0
CSKA Moscow	2021–22	Russian Premier League	16	1	2	0	–		–		18	1
CSKA Moscow	2022–23	Russian Premier League	9	0	5	0	–		–		14	0
CSKA Moscow	2024–25	Russian Premier League	1	0	1	0	–		–		2	0
CSKA Moscow	Total		28	1	8	0	0	0	0	0	36	1
Pari NN (loan)	2022–23	Russian Premier League	11	1	2	0	–		2 (Note: Appearances in relegation play-offs)	1	15	1
Khimki (loan)	2023–24	Russian First League	7	2	1	0	–		–		8	2
Urartu (loan)	2024–25	Armenian Premier League	6	2	1	0	–		–		7	2
Urartu (loan)	2025–26	Armenian Premier League	–		–		2 (Note: Appearances in the UEFA Conference League)	0	–		2	0
Urartu (loan)	Total		6	2	1	0	0	0	2	0	9	2
Volga Ulyanovsk	2025–26	Russian First League	24	4	1	1	–		–		25	5
Career total			76	10	13	1	2	0	2	1	93	11

== Honours ==
=== Club ===
CSKA Moscow

- Russian Cup: 2022–23, 2024–25
