= Bruno Michel =

Brazilian footballer (born 1999)

Personal information
- Full name: Bruno Michel Santana
- Date of birth: 1 June 1999 (age 27)
- Place of birth: Santo Anastácio, Brazil
- Height: 1.70 m (5 ft 7 in)
- Position: Attacking midfielder

Team information
- Current team: Urartu
- Number: 30

Youth career
- –2016: Corinthians
- 2017–2018: São Bernardo
- 2018: Athletico Paranaense
- 2019: São Bernardo
- 2019: → Atlético Mineiro (loan)

Senior career*
Years	Team	Apps	(Gls)
2018	Ohod Club	11	(0)
2019–2020	São Bernardo	0	(0)
2019–2020	→ Atlético Mineiro (loan)	0	(0)
2020	→ Figueirense (loan)	40	(2)
2021	Ponte Preta	11	(0)
2021–2022	Botafogo-SP	49	(8)
2023	Guarani	5	(0)
2023	São Bernardo	18	(2)
2024	Santo André	10	(2)
2025–	Urartu	37	(25)

International career^{‡}
2015	Brazil U15	1	(0)
- * Club domestic league appearances and goals as of 18 June 2026 ‡ National team caps and goals as of 17:17, 21 January 2020 (UTC)

Bruno Michel Santana (born 1 June 1999) is a Brazilian footballer who plays for as an attacking midfielder for Urartu.

== Career statistics ==
=== Club ===
As of 21 January 2020.

Club	Season	League			State league		Cup		Continental		Other		Total	
Club	Season	Division	Apps	Goals	Apps	Goals	Apps	Goals	Apps	Goals	Apps	Goals	Apps	Goals
Ohod Club	2018–19	Saudi Professional League	11	0	–		0	0	0	0	0	0	11	0
Atlético Mineiro	2020	Série A	0	0	0	0	0	0	0	0	0	0	0	0
Urartu	2024–25	Armenian Premier League	12	6	2	0	-		0 (Note: Appearances in the UEFA Conference League)	0	-		14	6
Urartu	2025–26	Armenian Premier League	19	18	2	0	-		2	0	-		23	18
Urartu	Total		31	24	4	0	-	-	2	0	-	-	37	24
Career total			11	0	0	0	0	0	0	0	0	0	11	0
