= Jan Poštulka =

Czech footballer (born 1949)

Personal information
- Date of birth: 9 March 1949 (age 77)
- Place of birth: Czechoslovakia
- Position: Goalkeeper

Senior career*
| Years | Team | Apps | (Gls) |
| 1971–1978 | Sparta Prague | | |
| 1978–1980 | Inter Bratislava | | |
| 1980–1981 | Bohemians Prague | 8 | (0) |
| 1981–1982 | Vagónka Česká Lípa | 12 | (0) |
| 1982–1983 | Bohemians Prague | 0 | (0) |

Managerial career
- 1983–1990: Bohemians Prague (assistant)
- 1990: Hradec Králové (assistant)
- 1991–1993: Alajuelense
- 1993–1994: Kladno
- 1995–1996: SK Český Brod
- 1996–1998: Sparta Prague (assistant)
- 1998–1999: Municipal
- 2000–2004: FK Teplice (assistant)
- 2005: České Budějovice (assistant)
- 2005–2006: České Budějovice B
- 2007: Banants Yerevan
- * Club domestic league appearances and goals

Jan Poštulka (born 9 March 1949) is a Czech former football player and later coach. He played as a goalkeeper for Czechoslovak teams Sparta Prague and Bohemians Prague. As a head coach, he enjoyed his greatest success in Central America (Champion of Central America, Champion of Costa Rica, Guatemala Cup Winner, LG Cup Winner) where he worked in the 1990s with the L.D.Alajuelense. As a coach, he spent some years with Sparta Prague. He managed FC Banants Yerevan to victory in the 2007 Armenian Cup.

== Playing career (goalkeeper) ==
- 1971–78 Sparta Prague 1.Czechoslovakia's league
- 1978–80 Inter Bratislava 1.Czechoslovakia's league
- 1980–83 Bohemians Prague 1.Czechoslovakia's league (80–83 participation in UEFA Cup)

== Trainer career ==
- 1983–90 Bohemians Prague 1.Czech league – Assistant of head coach

- champion of Czech Republic
- participation in UEFA Cup

- 1990–91 Hradec Králové 1.Czech league – Assistant of head coach
- 1991–93 L.D.Alajuelense 1.Costa Rican league – Head coach

- champion of Costa Rica
- champion of Central America and the Caribbean
- finalist of CONCACAF

- 1996–98 Sparta Prague 1. Czech league – Assistant of head coach

- 2x champion of the Czech Republic
- 2x participation in UEFA Champions League

- 1998–99 Municipal de Guatemala 1.Guatemalan league – Head coach

- winner of Guatemala Cup
- LG cup winner (venue Costa Rica)

- 2000–04 FK Teplice 1. Czech league – assistant and head coach

- Czech cup winner
- 3rd round of UEFA Cup

- 2005 SK Dynamo Ceské Budejovice 1.Czech league – assistant of head coach
- 2007 FC Banants Yerevan 1. Armenian league – Head coach
  - Armenian Cup winner

== Other ==
Fair Play prize of the Czech Olympic Committee for lifetime contribution.

== Trivia ==
His son Tomáš Poštulka is a goalkeeper, playing notably for Sparta Prague.
