= FC Bentonit Ijevan =

Bentonit
- Full name: Football Club Bentonit
- Founded: 1977; 48 years ago

FC Bentonit (Armenian: Ֆուտբոլային Ակումբ Բենտոնիտ), is an Armenian football club based in the town of Vanadzor, Lori Province.

== History ==
The club was founded in 1977 FC Bentonit Ijevan. In 1992, it was renamed Kaen Ijevan, and later in 1993 it was known as BMA Ijevan. After a brief retirement between 1994 and 1995 the club participated in the 1996–97 Armenian First League competition as FC Kaen Ijevan. The club did not participate in the domestic competitions between 1997 and 1999. In 2002, the club entered another period of interval until 2006. In 2007, they played a single season in the Armenian First League as FC Bentonit Ijevan under the ownership of the "Ijevan Bentonit Combine OJSC", before being dissolved in 2007. The team was revived in 2019, and in 2023–24 season played in the third-tier league, Amateur A-League. In 2024, the team got licensed and returned to play in the Armenian First League for the first time since 2007. Their home ground is the Lori Stadium in Vanadzor, where they are currently located.

== League and cup record ==
Season	League										Armenian Cup
Season	Name	Division	Position	GP	W	D	L	GS	GA	GD	Armenian Cup
1990	Bentonit Ijevan	Armenian SSR League	20	30	3	8	19	35	93	14	
1991	Bentonit Ijevan	no participation									
1992	Kayen Ijevan	Armenian First League	9	26	17	2	7	52	29	+23	
1993 (withdrew)	BMA Ijevan	Armenian First League	6	21	9	5	7	35	29	+6	
1994–96	Bentonit Ijevan	no participation									
1996–97	Kayen Ijevan	Armenian First League	12	22	1	3	18	19	75	-56	
1997–2006	Bentonit Ijevan	no participation									
2007 (withdrew)	Bentonit Ijevan	Armenian First League	9	3	2	0	1	8	4	+4	Quarter-finals
2008–2023	Bentonit Ijevan	no participation									
2023–24	Bentonit	Amateur A-League Group B	2	10	6	1	3	26	28	-2	no participation
2024–25	Bentonit	Armenian First League	10	24	6	6	12	38	53	-15	First Round
