= Maksim Paliyenko =

Russian footballer

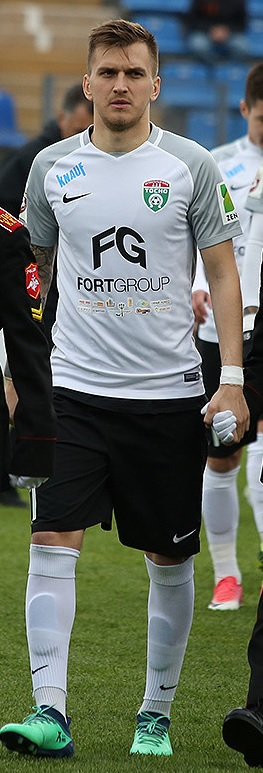
- Paliyenko with Tosno in 2018

Personal information
- Full name: Maksim Vladimirovich Paliyenko
- Date of birth: 18 October 1994 (age 32)
- Place of birth: Samara, Russia
- Height: 1.77 m (5 ft 10 in)
- Position: Midfielder

Team information
- Current team: KDV Tomsk
- Number: 99

Youth career
- Spartak Moscow
- Lada-Tolyatti
- Krylia Sovetov Samara

Senior career*
Years	Team	Apps	(Gls)
2011–2016	Krylia Sovetov Samara	11	(0)
2015–2016	→ Zenit St. Petersburg (loan)	2	(0)
2015–2016	→ Zenit-2 St. Petersburg (loan)	30	(4)
2016–2018	Tosno	43	(6)
2018–2020	Nizhny Novgorod	59	(14)
2020	Chayka Peschanokopskoye	11	(0)
2020–2021	Orenburg	22	(2)
2021–2024	Akron Tolyatti	80	(10)
2025	Urartu	11	(0)
2025–	KDV Tomsk	36	(2)

International career^{‡}
2016	Russia U-21	1	(1)
- * Club domestic league appearances and goals as of 1 November 2026 ‡ National team caps and goals as of 11 October 2016

Maksim Vladimirovich Paliyenko (Russian: Максим Владимирович Палиенко; born 18 October 1994) is a Russian professional football player who plays as an attacking midfielder for KDV Tomsk.

== Club career ==
He made his debut in the Russian Premier League on 22 July 2013 for Krylia Sovetov Samara in a game against CSKA Moscow.

He played as Tosno won the 2017–18 Russian Cup final against Avangard Kursk on 9 May 2018 in the Volgograd Arena.

On 27 December 2024, Paliyenko left Akron Tolyatti by mutual consent.

On 6 February 2025, Urartu announced the signing of a contract with Palienko. On 5 August 2025, Palienko left the club.

== Career statistics ==
As of match played 11 May 2025

Appearances and goals by club, season and competition
Club	Season	League			Cup		Europe		Other		Total	
Club	Season	Division	Apps	Goals	Apps	Goals	Apps	Goals	Apps	Goals	Apps	Goals
Krylia Sovetov Samara	2013–14	Russian Premier League	1	0	0	0	—		0	0	1	0
Krylia Sovetov Samara	2014–15	Russian First League	10	0	0	0	—		4 (Note: Appearances in the FNL Cup)	0	14	0
Krylia Sovetov Samara	Total		11	0	0	0	—		4	0	15	0
Zenit-2 St. Petersburg	2015–16	Russian First League	30	4	—		—		3	1	33	5
Zenit St. Petersburg	2015–16	Russian Premier League	2	0	0	0	0	0	0	0	2	0
Tosno	2016–17	Russian First League	32	6	3	1	—		—		35	7
Tosno	2017–18	Russian Premier League	11	0	4	2	—		—		15	2
Tosno	Total		43	6	7	3	—		—		50	9
Nizhny Novgorod	2018–19	Russian First League	32	9	3	0	—		2 (Note: Appearances in the promotion play-offs)	0	37	9
Nizhny Novgorod	2019–20	Russian First League	27	5	2	0	—		—		29	5
Nizhny Novgorod	Total		59	14	5	0	—		2	0	66	14
Chayka Peschanokopskoye	2020–21	Russian First League	11	0	1	0	—		—		12	0
Orenburg	2020–21	Russian First League	22	2	1	0	—		—		23	2
Akron Tolyatti	2021–22	Russian First League	35	3	1	0	—		—		36	3
Akron Tolyatti	2022–23	Russian First League	23	4	6	0	—		—		29	4
Akron Tolyatti	2023–24	Russian First League	14	2	0	0	—		2	0	16	2
Akron Tolyatti	2024–25	Russian Premier League	8	1	6	1	—		—		14	2
Akron Tolyatti	Total		80	10	13	1	0	0	2	0	95	11
Urartu	2024–25	Armenian Premier League	9	0	2	0	0	0	—		11	0
Career total			267	36	29	4	0	0	11	1	307	41

== Honours ==
=== Club ===
Tosno

- Russian Cup: 2017–18
