= Ivan Ignatyev =

Russian footballer (born 1999)

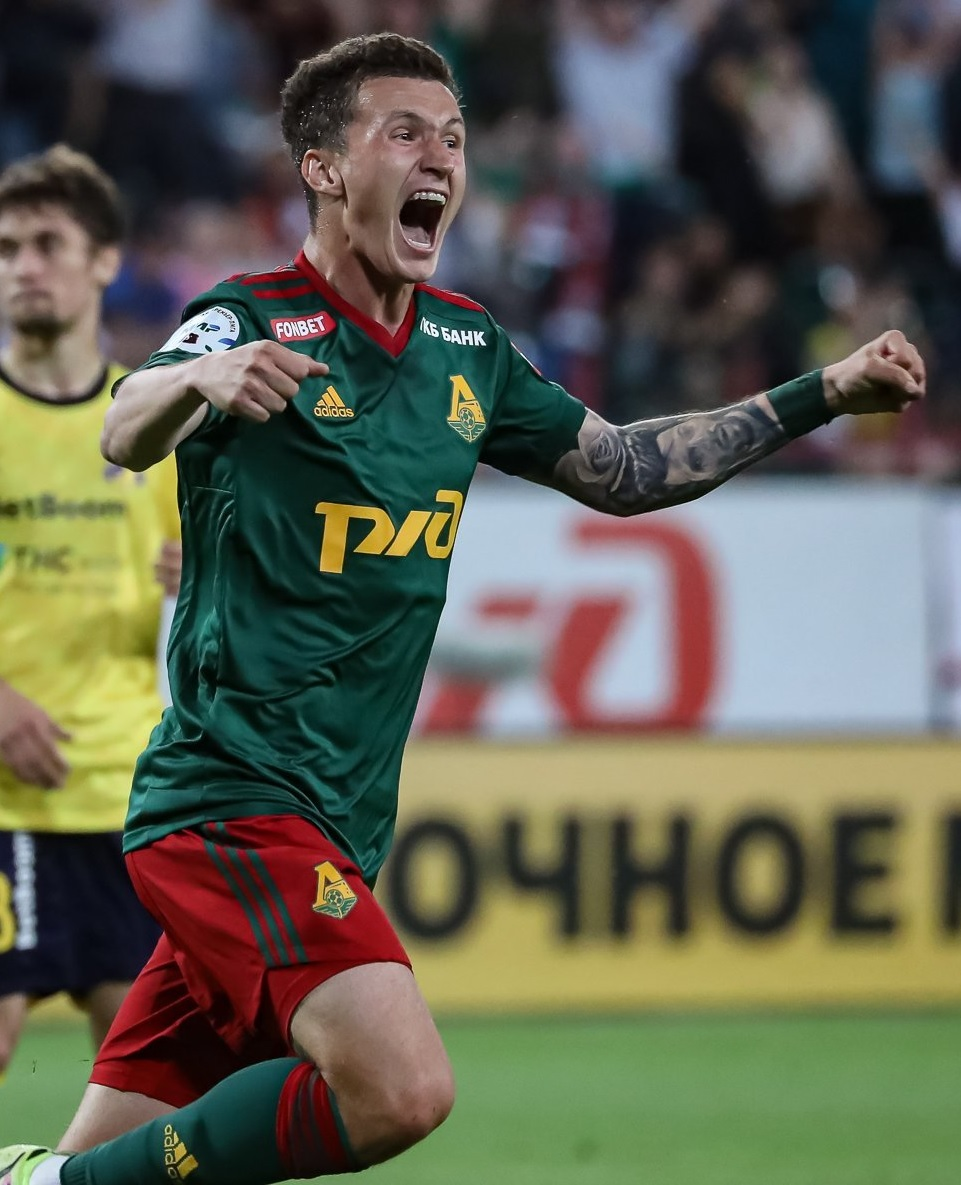
- Ignatyev with Lokomotiv Moscow in 2022

Personal information
- Full name: Ivan Aleksandrovich Ignatyev
- Date of birth: 6 January 1999 (age 27)
- Place of birth: Achinsk, Russia
- Height: 1.80 m (5 ft 11 in)
- Position: Striker

Youth career
- –2011: Tsentr Futbola Achinsk
- 2011–2015: Krasnodar

Senior career*
Years	Team	Apps	(Gls)
2015–2017	Krasnodar-2	55	(44)
2017–2019	Krasnodar	37	(13)
2020–2022	Rubin Kazan	37	(3)
2022	→ Krylia Sovetov Samara (loan)	5	(1)
2022–2023	Lokomotiv Moscow	20	(5)
2023–2024	Sochi	12	(2)
2024	Železničar Pančevo	7	(0)
2024–2025	Urartu	16	(13)
2025	JS Kabylie	15	(5)
2025–2026	Orenburg	5	(0)
2026	→ Arsenal Tula (loan)	2	(0)

International career^{‡}
2014	Russia U-15	2	(1)
2014–2015	Russia U-16	6	(2)
2015–2016	Russia U-17	8	(3)
2016–2017	Russia U-18	13	(13)
2017	Russia U-19	3	(4)
2017–2020	Russia U-21	12	(1)
- * Club domestic league appearances and goals as of 16 May 2026 ‡ National team caps and goals as of 13 November 2020

Ivan Aleksandrovich Ignatyev (Russian: Иван Александрович Игнатьев; born 6 January 1999) is a Russian professional footballer who plays as a striker.

== Club career ==
He made his debut in the Russian Professional Football League for Krasnodar-2 on 3 May 2016 in a game against Chernomorets Novorossiysk.

He made his debut for the main squad of Krasnodar on 27 July 2017 in a 2017–18 UEFA Europa League third qualifying round game against Lyngby.

On his Russian Premier League debut on 10 August 2017, he scored a goal in added time to give Krasnodar a 3–2 victory over Akhmat Grozny.

On his second UEFA Europa League appearance, he scored his first Europa League goal which helped his team to a 3–2 victory vs Red Star Belgrade.

When Fyodor Smolov, the top scorer of the Russian Premier League for two seasons running, recovered from the injury he was suffering from in the beginning of the 2017–18 season and moved back into the lineup, Ignatyev was moved back into the Krasnodar's junior squad. He continued to score prolifically there, including 16 goals in 12 games for the Under-21 squad and 10 goals in the 2017–18 UEFA Youth League, including 5 in one game and 4 in another, making him the top scorer of that competition at the winter break. Ignatyev started the next Russian Premier League game that Smolov was given rest for, against Amkar Perm on 10 December 2017, and scored his second league goal in his team's 3–1 victory.

On 28 December 2019, he signed a contract with Rubin Kazan until 30 May 2024.

On 2 February 2022, Ignatyev moved to Krylia Sovetov Samara on loan until the end of the 2021–22 season, with an option to buy.

Ignatyev's contract with Rubin was terminated by mutual consent on 27 June 2022.

On 21 July 2022, Ignatyev signed with Lokomotiv Moscow for the term of one season, with an option to extend for two more. On 28 August 2022, he scored a hat-trick in 11 minutes in the first half of the 5–1 victory over Orenburg. He left Lokomotiv in June 2023.

On 22 June 2023, Ignatyev joined Sochi. On 14 January 2024, Ignatyev left Sochi by mutual consent.

On 29 June 2024, Armenian Premier League club Urartu announced the signing of Ignatyev from Železničar Pančevo. On 6 February 2025, after scoring 13 goals in 19 appearances for Urartu Ignatyev left the club to sign for Algerian Ligue Professionnelle 1 club JS Kabylie. In July 2025, he chose to leave JS Kabylie to return to Russia.

On 30 August 2025, Ignatyev signed with Orenburg in the Russian Premier League. On 29 January 2026, he moved on loan to Arsenal Tula in the Russian First League.

== Career statistics ==
As of match played 16 May 2026

Appearances and goals by club, season and competition
Club	Season	League			Cup		Europe		Other		Total	
Club	Season	Division	Apps	Goals	Apps	Goals	Apps	Goals	Apps	Goals	Apps	Goals
Krasnodar-2	2015–16	Russian Second League	2	0	–		–		–		2	0
Krasnodar-2	2016–17	Russian Second League	1	0	–		–		1 (Note: One appearance in FNL Cup)	2	2	2
Krasnodar-2	2017–18	Russian Second League	1	0	–		–		1 (Note: One appearance in FNL Cup)	0	2	0
Krasnodar-2	2018–19	Russian First League	7	1	–		–		0	0	7	1
Krasnodar-2	2019–20	Russian First League	1	0	–		–		0	0	1	0
Krasnodar-2	Total		12	1	0	0	0	0	2	2	14	3
Krasnodar	2017–18	Russian Premier League	4	2	0	0	2 (Note: Appearances in the UEFA Europa League)	1	–		6	3
Krasnodar	2018–19	Russian Premier League	20	7	3	2	6	0	–		29	9
Krasnodar	2019–20	Russian Premier League	13	4	0	0	6 (Note: Three appearances in the UEFA Champions League, three appearances, one goal in the UEFA Europa League)	1	–		19	5
Krasnodar	Total		37	13	3	2	14	2	0	0	54	17
Rubin Kazan	2019–20	Russian Premier League	11	1	0	0	–		–		11	1
Rubin Kazan	2020–21	Russian Premier League	17	2	2	0	–		–		19	2
Rubin Kazan	2021–22	Russian Premier League	9	0	0	0	1 (Note: Appearances in the UEFA Europa Conference League)	0	–		10	0
Rubin Kazan	Total		37	3	2	0	1	0	0	0	40	3
Krylia Sovetov Samara (loan)	2021–22	Russian Premier League	5	1	–		–		–		5	1
Lokomotiv Moscow	2022–23	Russian Premier League	20	5	7	0	–		–		27	5
Sochi	2023–24	Russian Premier League	12	2	6	0	–		–		18	2
Železničar Pančevo	2023–24	Serbian SuperLiga	7	0	0	0	–		0	0	7	0
Urartu	2024–25	Armenian Premier League	16	13	1	0	2	0	–		19	13
JS Kabylie	2024–25	Algerian Ligue Professionnelle 1	15	5	–		–		–		15	5
Orenburg	2025–26	Russian Premier League	5	0	4	0	–		–		9	0
Arsenal Tula (loan)	2025–26	Russian First League	2	0	1	0	–		–		3	0
Career total			168	43	24	2	17	2	2	2	211	49

== Honours ==
=== Individual ===
- UEFA Youth League top goalscorer: 2017–18 (10 goals)
