= Kim Splidsboel =

Danish footballer and manager (born 1955)

Personal information
- Full name: Kim Michael Splidsboel
- Date of birth: 25 November 1955 (age 70)
- Place of birth: Copenhagen, Denmark
- Position: Sweeper

Senior career*
Years	Team	Apps	(Gls)
- Hvidovre IF
- Herfølge BK

Managerial career
- 1984–1987: Denmark U16
- 1985–1986: Hvidovre IF
- 1987–1990: Brøndby IF U23
- 1990–1991: Holbæk B&I
- 1991–1994: Dragør BK
- 2000–2002: Malawi
- 2003–2005: Hvidovre IF
- 2007–2008: Værløse BK
- 2008: FC Banants
- 2010–2011: B 1908
- 2012–2014: B93
- 2015: BK Avarta
- * Club domestic league appearances and goals

Kim Michael Splidsboel (born 25 November 1955) is a Danish football manager and former professional player who played as a sweeper. He was most recently the manager of Danish 2nd Division side, BK Avarta.

== Playing career ==
Splidsboel played professionally for Hvidovre IF and Herfølge BK.

== Coaching career ==
Splidsboel has managed Denmark U16, Hvidovre IF, Brøndby IF U23, Holbæk B&I, Dragør BK, Malawi, Værløse BK, and FC Banants from August 2008 to October 2008.

He was named manager of B 1908 from January 2010. He left the club at the end of his contract on 31 December 2011.

On 30 April 2012, Splidsboel was brought in as manager of B93 in order to save the club from relegation. He left the club following the 2013–14-season. In January 2015 he became new manager of BK Avarta. He was sacked a few months later and replaced by Benny Gall.
