= 2007 Armenian Cup =

Tournament details
- Country: Armenia
- Teams: 14

Final positions
- Champions: Banants
- Runners-up: Ararat

Tournament statistics
- Matches played: 25
- Goals scored: 78 (3.12 per match)

The 2007 Armenian Cup was the 16th edition of the Armenian Cup, a football competition. In 2007, the tournament had 14 participants, out of which 4 were reserve teams.

== Results ==
=== First round ===
Pyunik and Mika received byes to the quarter finals, as they were champions and cup holders respectively.

The first legs were played on 21 and 22 March 2007. The second legs were played on 31 March and 1 April 2007.

| Team 1 | Agg. | Team 2 | 1st leg | 2nd leg |
|---|---|---|---|---|
| Banants | 8–1 | Dinamo Yerevan | 5–0 | 3–1 |
| Shirak | 3–0 | Mika-2 | 2–0 | 1–0 |
| Pyunik-2 | 0–3 | Ararat Yerevan | 0–2 | 0–1 |
| Kilikia | 7–4 | Banants-2 | 3–2 | 4–2 |
| Ararat-2 | 0–4 | Ulisses | 0–2 | 0–2 |
| Gandzasar | 1–2 | Bentonit | 1–0 | 0–2 |

=== Quarter-finals ===
The first legs were played on 5 and 6 April 2007. The second legs were played on 10 April 2007.

| Team 1 | Agg. | Team 2 | 1st leg | 2nd leg |
|---|---|---|---|---|
| Banants | 11–2 | Kilikia | 5–1 | 6–1 |
| Mika | 5–2 | Shirak | 4–1 | 1–1 |
| Pyunik | 8–2 | Bentonit | 4–0 | 4–1 |
| Ararat Yerevan | 4–1 | Ulisses | 2–0 | 2–1 |

=== Semi-finals ===
The first legs were played on 18 April 2007. The second legs were played on 1 May 2007.

| Team 1 | Agg. | Team 2 | 1st leg | 2nd leg |
|---|---|---|---|---|
| Ararat Yerevan | 2–1 | Pyunik | 1–0 | 1–1 |
| Banants | 2–1 | Mika | 1–0 | 1–1 |

=== Final ===
9 May 2007

| Banants | 3 – 1 (a.e.t.) | Ararat Yerevan |
|---|---|---|
| S. Muradyan 80', 117'; A. Bareghamyan 108' | | Pizzelli 33' |

Vazgen Sargsyan Republican Stadium, Yerevan
Attendance: 6,000
Referee: Karen Nalbandyan (Yerevan)

== See also ==
- 2007 Armenian Premier League
- 2007 Armenian First League
