= Mariano Ahouangbo =

Beninese footballer

Personal information
- Full name: Mariano Bruguel Ahouangbo
- Date of birth: 16 November 2002 (age 23)
- Place of birth: Porto-Novo, Benin
- Height: 1.72 m (5 ft 8 in)
- Position: Defensive midfielder

Team information
- Current team: Gandzasar Kapan
- Number: 6

Senior career*
Years	Team	Apps	(Gls)
2023–2025	AS Soliman	16	(0)
2025–	Olimpija Ljubljana	0	(0)
2026–	→ Gandzasar Kapan (loan)	8	(1)

International career^{‡}
2024–	Benin	2	(0)
- * Club domestic league appearances and goals as of 18 June 2026 ‡ National team caps and goals as of 26 March 2024

Mariano Bruguel Ahouangbo (born 16 November 2002) is a Beninese football player who plays as a defensive midfielder for Armenian Premier League club Gandzasar Kapan and the Benin national team.

== International career ==
Ahouangbo made his debut for the senior Benin national team on 23 March 2024 in a friendly against the Ivory Coast,
