= Artemi Gunko =

Russian footballer

Personal information
- Full name: Artemi Dmitriyevich Gunko
- Date of birth: 6 April 2004 (age 22)
- Place of birth: Moscow, Russia
- Height: 1.75 m (5 ft 9 in)
- Position: Midfielder

Team information
- Current team: Volna Nizhny Novgorod Oblast
- Number: 7

Youth career
- –2023: Spartak Moscow

Senior career*
Years	Team	Apps	(Gls)
2024	Kosmos Dolgoprudny	27	(4)
2025–2026	Urartu	23	(4)
2026–	Volna Nizhny Novgorod Oblast	9	(0)
- * Club domestic league appearances and goals as of 31 October 2026

Artemi Dmitriyevich Gunko (Russian: Артемий Дмитриевич Гунько; born 6 April 2004) is a Russian footballer who plays as a midfielder for Volna Nizhny Novgorod Oblast.

== Club career ==
Dzhabrailov made his debut in the Russian Second League for Kosmos Dolgoprudny on 7 April 2024 in a game against Spartak Tambov.

He made his Armenian Premier League debut for Urartu on 9 March 2025 in a game against Pyunik.

On 28 July 2026, Urartu announced that Gunko had left the club by mutual agreement.

== Personal life ==
His father Dmitri Gunko was also professional footballer.
