= Anton Suchkow =

Belarusian footballer

Personal information
- Date of birth: 29 May 2002 (age 24)
- Place of birth: Grodno, Belarus
- Height: 1.83 m (6 ft 0 in)
- Position: Forward

Team information
- Current team: Neman Grodno
- Number: 17

Youth career
- 2016–2020: Neman Grodno

Senior career*
Years	Team	Apps	(Gls)
2020–	Neman Grodno	60	(10)
2022	→ Naftan Novopolotsk (loan)	9	(6)
2024	→ Naftan Novopolotsk (loan)	28	(6)

International career^{‡}
2022–2023	Belarus U21	4	(0)
- * Club domestic league appearances and goals as of 1 December 2025 ‡ National team caps and goals as of 20 June 2023

Anton Suchkow (Belarusian: Антон Сучкоў; Russian: Антон Сучков; born 29 May 2002) is a Belarusian professional footballer who plays for Neman Grodno.

He is a son of former Belarus international footballer Alyaksey Suchkow.
