= Sergey Mkrtchyan =

Armenian footballer

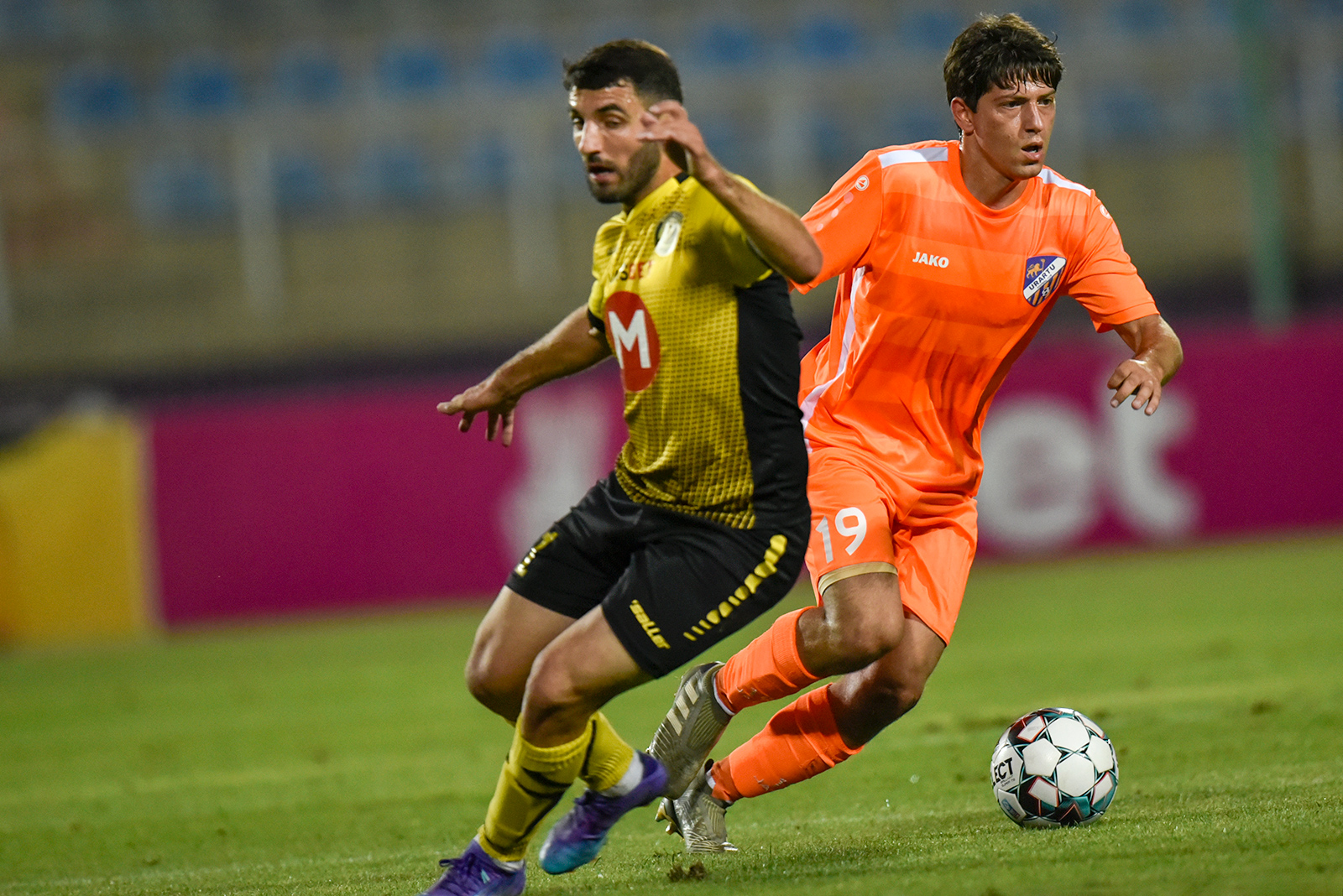

Personal information
- Date of birth: 26 June 2001 (age 25)
- Place of birth: Yerevan, Armenia
- Height: 1.75 m (5 ft 9 in)
- Position: Midfielder

Team information
- Current team: Urartu
- Number: 7

Senior career*
Years	Team	Apps	(Gls)
2017–2019	FC Banants-2	27	(2)
2019–2021	BKMA Yerevan	55	(6)
2021–	Urartu	89	(5)

International career^{‡}
2017	Armenia U17	3	(0)
2019	Armenia U18	8	(0)
2018–2019	Armenia U19	20	(0)
2020–2022	Armenia U21	11	(0)
2022–	Armenia	2	(0)
- * Club domestic league appearances and goals as of 18 June 2026 ‡ National team caps and goals as of 15:30, 19 November 2022 (UTC)

Sergey Mkrtchyan (Armenian: Սերգեյ Մկրտչյան, born 26 June 2001) is a professional football player who plays for Urartu, and the Armenia national team.

== Club career ==
Sergey Mkrtchyan is a graduate of Urartu. In 2019, the midfielder temporarily moved to the camp of the army club BKMA Yerevan, which plays in the Armenian First League, but in the summer of 2021 he returned to his native Urartu.

In 2022, Mkrtchyan became one of the nominees for the award of the Armenian Footballer of the Year

In February 2023, he sustaining a torn ACL, ruling him out from the end of the season. During rehabilitation, he suffered a recurrence of the same injury and was re-operated in early October 2023.

== International career ==
He represented Armenia at the 2019 UEFA European Under-19 Championship.

In September 2022, he received his first call-up to the Armenian senior national team for the UEFA Nations League matches against Ukraine and Republic of Ireland, respectively.

Mkrtchyan made his senior international debut for Armenia national team on 16 November 2022 in a friendly match against Kosovo, where he came in off the bench.

== Career statistics ==
=== International ===
As of 19 November 2022

Armenia
Year	Apps	Goals
2022	2	0
Total	2	0

=== Club ===
Urartu

- Armenian Premier League: 2022–23
- Armenian Cup: 2022–23
