= FC Urartu =

Armenian football club

Urartu
- Full name: Football Club Urartu
- Nickname: Հպարտ Առյուծներ Hpart Aryutsner (Proud Lions)
- Founded: January 20, 1992; 34 years ago
- Ground: Urartu Stadium
- Capacity: 4,860
- Owner: Dzhevan Cheloyants
- Director General: David Shakhbagyan
- Head coach: Hayk Milkon
- League: Armenian Premier League
- 2025–26: 5th of 10
- Website: fcurartu.am/am
Home colours	Away colours

Football Club Urartu (Armenian: Ուրարտու Ֆուտբոլային Ակումբ, translated Futbolayin Akumb Urartu), commonly known as Urartu, is an Armenian professional football team based in the capital Yerevan that currently plays in the Armenian Premier League. The club won the Armenian Cup four times, in 1992, 2007, 2016, and 2023. In 2013–2014, they won the Armenian Premier League for the first time in their history.

In early 2016, the Russia-based Armenian businessman Dzhevan Cheloyants became a co-owner of the club after purchasing the major part of the club shares. The club was known as FC Banants until 1 August 2019, when it was officially renamed FC Urartu.

== History ==
=== Kotayk ===
Urartu FC were founded as FC Banants by Sarkis Israelyan on 21 January 1992 in the village of Kotayk, representing the Kotayk Province. He named the club after his native village of Banants (currently known as Bayan). Between 1992 and 1995, the club was commonly referred to as Banants Kotayk. During the 1992 season, the club won the first Armenian Cup. At the end of the 1995 transitional season, Banants suffered a financial crisis. The club owners decided that it was better to merge the club with FC Kotayk of Abovyan, rather than disband it. In 2001, Banants demerged from FC Kotayk, and was moved from Abovyan to the capital Yerevan.

=== Yerevan ===
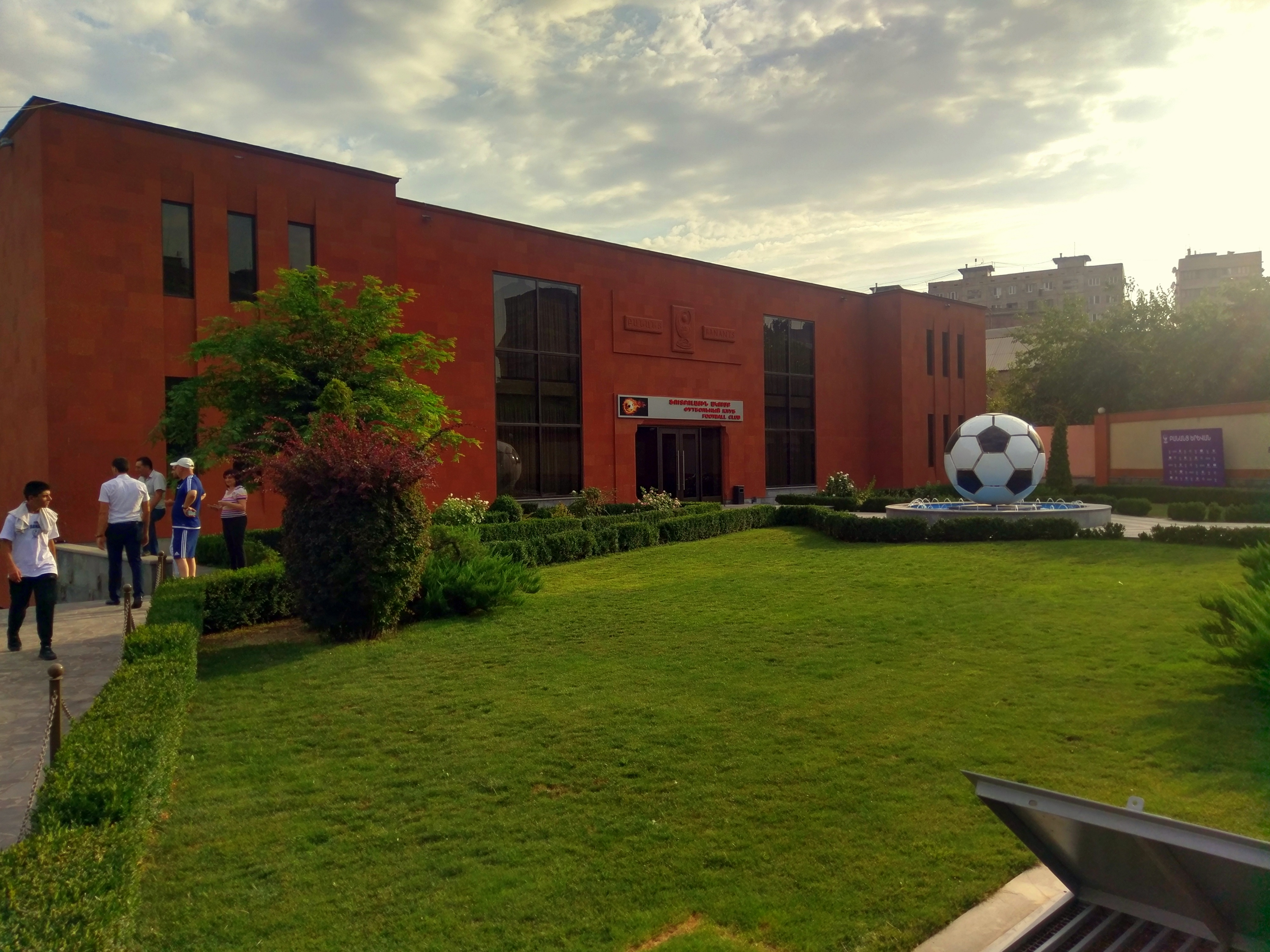
FC Urartu headquarters

In 2001, FC Banants was relocated to Yerevan. At the beginning of 2003, Banants merged with FC Spartak Yerevan, but was able to limit the name of the new merger to FC Banants. Spartak became Banants's youth academy and later changed the name to Banants-2. Because of the merger, Banants acquired many players from Spartak Yerevan, including Samvel Melkonyan. After the merger, Banants took a more serious approach and have finished highly in the league table ever since. The club managed to lift the Armenian Cup in 2007. Experience made way for youth for the 2008 and 2009 seasons. The departures of most of the experienced players have left the club's future to the youth. Along with two Ukrainian players, Ugandan international, Noah Kasule, has been signed.

The club headquarters are located on Jivani Street 2 of the Malatia-Sebastia District, Yerevan.

=== Domestic ===
Season	League										National Cup	Top goalscorer		Manager
Season	Div.	Pos.	Pl.	W	D	L	GS	GA	GD	P	National Cup	Name	League	Manager
1992	Armenian Premier League	3	34	28	3	3	125	34	+91	59	Winner	(Armenia) Ashot Barseghyan	34	Varuzhan Sukiasyan
1993	Armenian Premier League	3	28	23	2	3	111	21	+90	48	Semi-final	(Armenia) Andranik Hovsepyan	26	Varuzhan Sukiasyan
1994	Armenian Premier League	5	28	17	1	10	95	56	+39	35	Semi-final			Varuzhan Sukiasyan
1995-2000	No Participation													
2001	Armenian Premier League	7	22	10	4	8	46	28	+18	34	First round	(Armenia) Mkrtich Hovhannisyan	11	
2002	Armenian Premier League	3	22	16	2	4	43	15	+28	50	Quarter-final	(Armenia) Tigran Yesayan	11	
2003	Armenian Premier League	2	28	21	3	4	89	15	+74	66	Finalist	(Armenia) Ara Hakobyan	45	Oganes Zanazanyan
2004	Armenian Premier League	3	28	12	7	9	40	39	+1	43	Finalist	(Armenia) Samvel Melkonyan	8	Oganes Zanazanyan
2005	Armenian Premier League	3	26	15	6	5	49	31	+18	51	Semi-final	(Armenia) Aram Hakobyan	11	Oganes Zanazanyan; Ashot Barseghyan
2006	Armenian Premier League	2	28	18	3	7	67	26	+41	57	Semi-final	(Armenia) Aram Hakobyan	25	Ashot Barseghyan; Nikolay Kiselyov
2007	Armenian Premier League	2	28	16	4	8	56	26	+30	52	Winner	(Armenia) Arsen Balabekyan	15	Nikolay Kiselyov; Jan Poštulka; Nikolay Kostov
2008	Armenian Premier League	5	28	11	8	9	34	25	+9	41	Finalist	(Armenia) Arsen Balabekyan	7	Nikolay Kostov; Nedelcho Matushev; Kim Splidsboel
2009	Armenian Premier League	4	28	13	5	10	40	29	+11	44	Finalist	(Armenia) Samvel Melkonyan	12	Armen Gyulbudaghyants
2010	Armenian Premier League	2	28	20	4	4	58	24	+34	64	Finalist	(Brazil) Du Bala	11	Stevica Kuzmanovski
2011	Armenian Premier League	4	28	12	8	8	42	30	+12	44	Semi-final	(Brazil) Bruno Correa	16	Rafael Nazaryan
2011-12	Armenian Premier League	Only Cup competition was held									Quarter-final			
2012-13	Armenian Premier League	8	42	5	16	21	37	64	-27	31	First round	(Armenia) Hovhannes Hambardzumyan	7	Rafael Nazaryan; Volodymyr Pyatenko
2013-14	Armenian Premier League	1	28	14	8	6	38	23	+15	50	Semi-final	(Armenia) Gevorg Nranyan	10	Zsolt Hornyák
2014-15	Armenian Premier League	6	28	8	8	12	42	46	-4	32	Semi-final	(Armenia) Gevorg Nranyan	7	Zsolt Hornyák
2015-16	Armenian Premier League	6	28	7	12	9	36	34	+2	33	Winner	(Brazil) Laércio	10	Aram Voskanyan; Tito Ramallo
2016-17	Armenian Premier League	5	30	5	6	19	18	44	-26	21	Semi-final	(Brazil) Laércio	3	Tito Ramallo; Artur Voskanyan
2017-18	Armenian Premier League	2	30	11	11	8	42	34	+8	44	Semi-final	(Armenia) Rumyan Hovsepyan	8	Artur Voskanyan
2018-19	Armenian Premier League	3	32	14	10	8	43	35	+8	52	Semi-final	(Armenia) Vahagn Ayvazyan (Brazil) Walmerson (Bosnia and Herzegovina) Aleksandar Glišić	5	Artur Voskanyan; Ilshat Fayzulin
2019–20	Armenian Premier League	7	22	8	6	8	26	27	-1	30	Semi-final	(Russia) Yevgeni Kobzar	7	Ilshat Fayzulin; Aleksandr Grigoryan
2020–21	Armenian Premier League	3	24	12	5	7	28	19	+9	41	Quarter-final	(Haiti) Jonel Désiré	8	Aleksandr Grigoryan; Tigran Yesayan (Caretaker); Robert Arzumanyan
2021–22	Armenian Premier League	5	32	9	13	10	37	32	+5	40	Finalist	(Armenia) Artur Miranyan	10	Arsen Petrosyan; Robert Arzumanyan (Caretaker)
2022–23	Armenian Premier League	1	36	26	5	5	68	25	+43	83	Winners	(Ukraine) Dmytro Khlyobas	9	Dmitri Gunko
2023–24	Armenian Premier League	4	36	13	11	12	49	49	0	50	Finalist	(Russia) Temur Dzhikiya	11	Dmitri Gunko
2024–25	Armenian Premier League	3	30	19	5	6	64	31	+33	62	Quarter-final	(Russia) Ivan Ignatyev	13	Dmitri Gunko
2025–26	Armenian Premier League	5	27	14	7	6	43	26	+17	49	Runners Up	(Brazil) Bruno Michel	18	Robert Arzumanyan

=== European ===
As of match played 17 July 2025

Competition	Pld	W	D	L	GF	GA	GD
UEFA Champions League	4	2	0	2	6	6	0
UEFA Europa League / UEFA Cup	26	3	3	20	15	61	–46
UEFA Conference League	10	2	0	8	10	2	-12
Total	40	7	3	30	31	89	−58

Season	Competition	Round	Opponent	Home	Away	Aggregate
2003–04	UEFA Cup	QR	(Israel) Hapoel Tel Aviv	1–2	1–1	2–3
2004–05	UEFA Cup	1Q	(Ukraine) Illichivets Mariupol	0–2	0–2	0–4
2005–06	UEFA Cup	1Q	(Georgia (country)) Locomotive Tbilisi	2–3	2–0	4–3
2005–06	UEFA Cup	2Q	(Ukraine) Dnipro Dnipropetrovsk	2–4	0–4	2–8
2006–07	UEFA Cup	1Q	(Georgia (country)) Ameri Tbilisi	1–2	1–0	2–2 (a)
2007–08	UEFA Cup	1Q	(Switzerland) Young Boys	1–1	0–4	1–5
2008–09	UEFA Cup	1Q	(Austria) Red Bull Salzburg	0–3	0–7	0–10
2009–10	UEFA Europa League	1Q	(Bosnia and Herzegovina) Široki Brijeg	0–2	1–0	1–2
2010–11	UEFA Europa League	1Q	(Cyprus) Anorthosis Famagusta	0–1	0–3	0–4
2011–12	UEFA Europa League	1Q	(Georgia (country)) Rustavi Metalurgist	0–1	1–1	1–2
2014–15	UEFA Champions League	1Q	(Andorra) Santa Coloma	3–2	0–1	3–3 (a)
2016–17	UEFA Europa League	1Q	(Cyprus) Omonia	0–1	1–4	1–5
2018–19	UEFA Europa League	1Q	(Bosnia and Herzegovina) Sarajevo	1–2	0–3	1–5
2019–20	UEFA Europa League	1Q	(Serbia) Čukarički	0–5	0–3	0–8
2021–22	UEFA Europa Conference League	1Q	(Slovenia) Maribor	0–1	0–1	0–2
2023–24	UEFA Champions League	1Q	(Bosnia and Herzegovina) Zrinjski Mostar	0–1	3–2 (a.e.t.)	3–3 (3–4 p)
2023–24	UEFA Europa Conference League	2Q	(Romania) Farul Constanța	2–3	2–3	4–6
2024–25	UEFA Conference League	1Q	(Estonia) Tallinna Kalev	2–0	2–1	4–1
2024–25	UEFA Conference League	2Q	(Czech Republic) Baník Ostrava	0–2	1–5	1–7
2025–26	UEFA Conference League	1Q	(Belarus) Neman Grodno	1–2	0–4	1–6

== Stadium ==
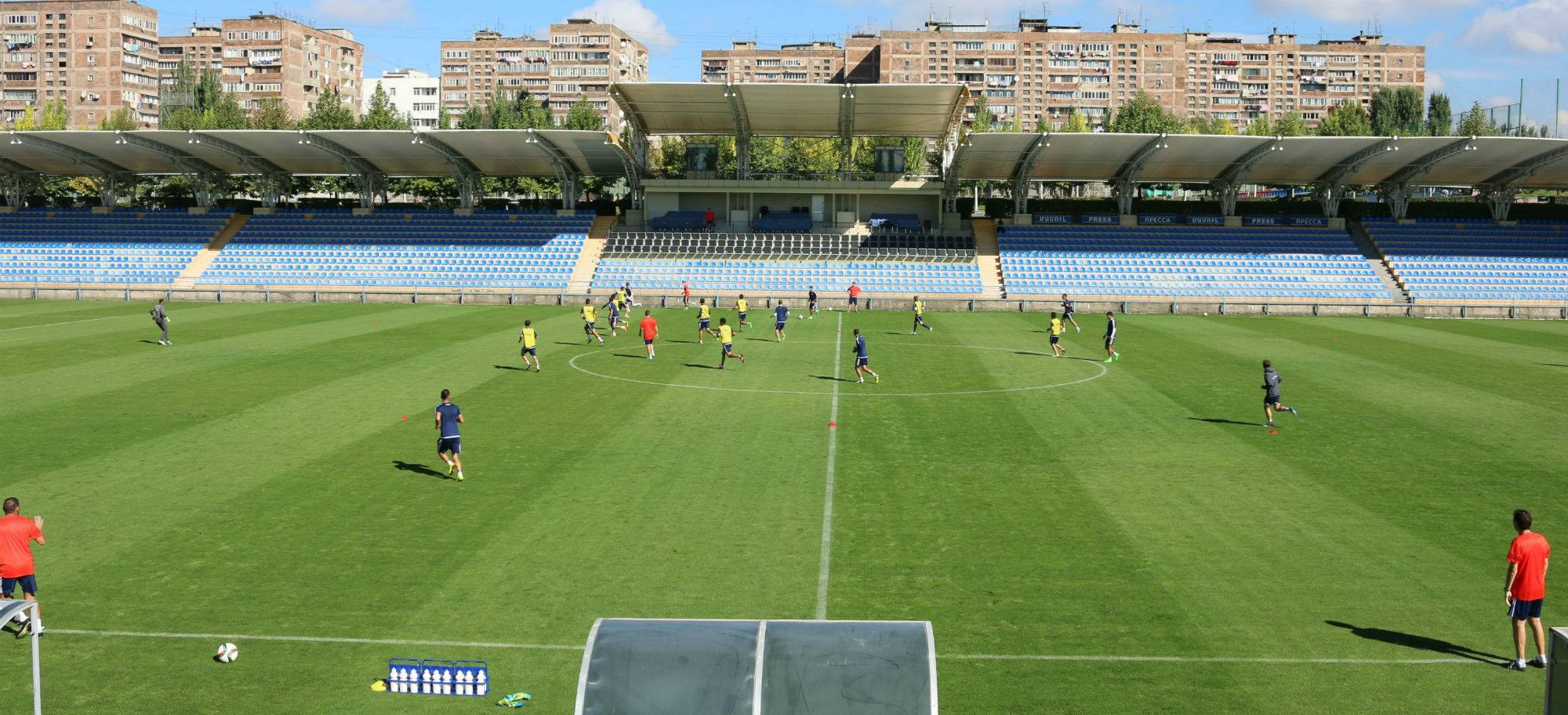
Urartu Stadium

The construction of the Urartu Stadium was launched in 2006 in the Malatia-Sebastia District of Yerevan, with the assistance of the FIFA goal programme. It was officially opened in 2008 with a capacity of 3,600 seats. Further developments were implemented later in 2011, when the playing pitch was modernized and the capacity of the stadium was increased up to 4,860 seats (2,760 at the northern stand, 1,500 at the southern stand and 600 at the western stand).

=== Training centre/academy ===
Urartu Training Centre is the club's academy base located in the Malatia-Sebastia District of Yerevan. In addition to the main stadium, the centre houses 3 full-size training pitches, mini football pitches as well as an indoor facility. The current technical director of the academy is the former Russian footballer Ilshat Faizulin.

== Fans ==
The most active group of fans is the South West Ultras fan club, mainly composed of residents from several neighbourhoods within the Malatia-Sebastia District of Yerevan, since the club is a de facto representer of the district. Members of the fan club benefit from events organized by the club and many facilities of the Banants training centre, such as the mini football pitch, the club store and other entertainments.

== Honours ==
- Armenian Premier League
  - Winners (2): 2013–14, 2022–23
  - Runners-up (5): 2003, 2006, 2007, 2010, 2017–18
- Armenian Cup
  - Winners (4): 1992, 2007, 2016, 2022–23
  - Runners-up (8): 2003, 2004, 2008, 2009, 2010, 2021–22, 2023–24, 2025–26
- Armenian Supercup
  - Winners (1): 2014
  - Runners-up (5): 2004, 2007, 2009, 2010, 2016

== Current squad ==
As of 9 September 2026

Note: Flags indicate national team as defined under FIFA eligibility rules; some limited exceptions apply. Players may hold more than one non-FIFA nationality.

No.	Pos.	Nation	Player
3	DF	ARM	Erik Piloyan
4	DF	ARM	Arman Ghazaryan
5	MF	BRA	Alef Santos
6	DF	ARM	Petik Manukyan
7	MF	ARM	Sergey Mkrtchyan
8	MF	ARM	Narek Agasaryan
9	FW	POR	Rajani
10	FW	ARM	Karen Melkonyan
11	FW	ARM	Edik Vardanyan
14	MF	UKR	Artem Polyarus
15	DF	UKR	Vladyslav Veremeev
16	GK	ARM	Nubar Gishyan
18	MF	UKR	Anton Bratkov
19	DF	ARM	Artur Melikyan

No.	Pos.	Nation	Player
21	MF	ARM	Levon Bashoyan
22	MF	ARM	Mikayel Mirzoyan
23	MF	ARM	Garnik Minasyan
27	FW	POR	Miguel Velosa
28	MF	JPN	Katsuyuki Ishibashi
30	MF	BRA	Bruno Michel
33	GK	MNE	Andrija Dragojević
44	DF	UKR	Yevhen Tsymbalyuk
66	DF	ARM	Zhora Dadamyan
77	MF	ARM	Gor Lulukyan
88	DF	ARM	Zhirayr Margaryan
91	FW	NED	Oege-Sietse van Lingen
92	GK	ARM	Aleksandr Mishiyev
99	DF	ARM	Khariton Ayvazyan

=== Out on loan ===
Note: Flags indicate national team as defined under FIFA eligibility rules; some limited exceptions apply. Players may hold more than one non-FIFA nationality.

No.	Pos.	Nation	Player
—	GK	ARM	Hayk Ghazaryan (at BKMA Yerevan until 30 June 2026)
—	MF	ARM	Arman Arakelyan (at BKMA Yerevan until 31 December 2026)

No.	Pos.	Nation	Player
53	MF	ARM	Davit Harutyunyan (at BKMA Yerevan until 30 June 2026)
—	MF	ARM	David Ghiasyan (at BKMA Yerevan until 30 June 2026)
—	MF	ARM	Hamlet Sargsyan (at BKMA Yerevan until 30 June 2026)

== Personnel ==
=== Technical staff ===
Position	Name
Head coach	(Armenia) Robert Arzumanyan
Assistant coach	(Russia) Mikhail Galaydich
Assistant coach	(Armenia) Aras Ozbiliz
Assistant coach	(Armenia) Erik Nazaryan
Goalkeepers coach	(Armenia) Stepan Ghazaryan
Fitness Trainer	(Spain) Victor Gomes
Coach Analyst	(Spain) Francisco Compañ
Team Doctor	(Armenia) Arsen Hambaryan
Team Manager	(Armenia) Areg Harutyunyan
Urartu-2 Head Coach	(Armenia) Karen Arakelyan

=== Management ===
Position	Name
President	(Armenia) Dzhevan Cheloyants
General Director	(Armenia) David Shakhbagyan
Executive Director	(Armenia) Sofia Cheloyants
Sporting Director	(Armenia) Erik Vardanyan
Deputy Director for Club Development	(Armenia) Eduard Markarov
Deputy General Director for Administration and Maintenance	(Armenia) Georgii Gzrayan
Deputy General Director for PR, Information and Marketing	(Armenia) Lusine Harutyunyan
Lawyer	(Armenia) Hamlet Petrosyan

== Urartu-2 ==
Urartu-2
- Founded: 2003
- Ground: Urartu Training Centre, Yerevan
- Capacity: 600
- Owner(s): Dzhevan Cheloyants & Oleg Mkrtchyan
- Director General: Arsen Petrosyan
- Manager: Karen Arakelyan
- League: Armenian First League
- 2021–22: 6th
- Website: https://www.fcurartu.am
Home colours	Away colours

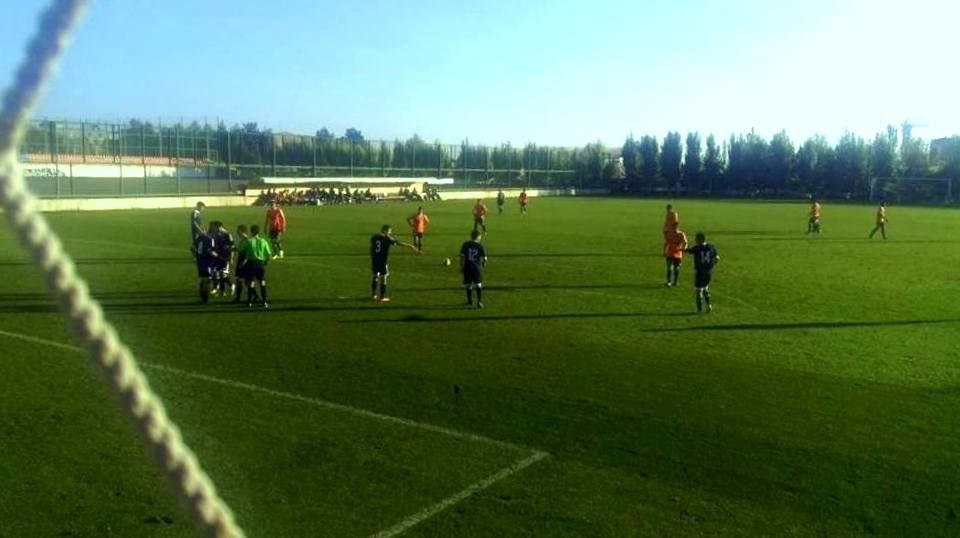
Banants Training Centre

Urartu has also the second team, Urartu-2 which plays in the Armenian First League. They play their home games at the training field with artificial turf of the Urartu Training Centre.

== Managerial history ==
- (Armenia) Varuzhan Sukiasyan (1992–94)
- (Armenia) Poghos Galstyan (July 1, 1996 – June 30, 1998)
- (Armenia) Oganes Zanazanyan (2001–05)
- (Armenia) Ashot Barseghyan (2005–06)
- (Russia) Nikolay Kiselyov (2006–07)
- (Czech Republic) Jan Poštulka (2007)
- (Bulgaria) Nikolay Kostov (July 1, 2007 – April 8, 2008)
- (Bulgaria) Nedelcho Matushev (April 8, 2008 – June 30, 2008)
- (Denmark) Kim Splidsboel (2008)
- (Armenia) Armen Gyulbudaghyants (Jan 1, 2009 – Dec 1, 2009)
- (Armenia) Ashot Barseghyan (interim) (2009)
- (North Macedonia) Stevica Kuzmanovski (Jan 1, 2010 – Dec 31, 2010)
- (Armenia) Rafael Nazaryan (Jan 1, 2011 – Jan 15, 2012)
- (Ukraine) Volodymyr Pyatenko (Jan 17, 2013 – June 30, 2013)
- (Slovakia) Zsolt Hornyák (July 1, 2013 – May 30, 2015)
- (Armenia) Aram Voskanyan (July 1, 2015 – Oct 11, 2015)
- (Spain) Tito Ramallo (Oct 12, 2015 – Oct 3, 2016)
- (Armenia) Artur Voskanyan (Oct 3, 2016 – Aug 11, 2018)
- (Russia) Ilshat Faizulin (Aug 12, 2018 –Nov 24, 2019)
- (Armenia) Aleksandr Grigoryan (Nov 25, 2019 –Mar 10, 2021)
- (Armenia) Robert Arzumanyan (10 March 2021 – 24 June 2022)
- (Russia) Dmitri Gunko (27 June 2022 – 18 June 2025)
- (Armenia) Robert Arzumanyan (19 June 2025–)

== See also ==
- Football in Armenia
- Football Federation of Armenia
