= FC Ararat-Armenia in European football =

Overview of FC Ararat-Armenia's role in European football

Ararat-Armenia in European football
- Club: Ararat-Armenia
- Most appearances: Karen Muradyan (25)
- Top scorer: Mailson Lima (5)
- First entry: 2019–20 UEFA Champions League
- Latest entry: 2026–27 UEFA Champions League

FC Ararat-Armenia is an Armenian football club based in Yerevan, Armenia.

== History ==
=== 2010's ===
Ararat-Armenia made their European debut on 9 July 2019, in a UEFA Champions League First qualifying round match against AIK from Sweden, winning the match 2–1. In the second-leg they lost 3–1, and dropped in to the UEFA Europa League.

=== Matches ===
As of match played 5 November 2026

Season	Competition	Round	Club	Home	Away	Aggregate
2019–20	UEFA Champions League	1QR	(Sweden) AIK	2–1	1–3	3–4
2019–20	UEFA Europa League	2QR	(Gibraltar) Lincoln Red Imps	2–0	2–1	4–1
2019–20	UEFA Europa League	3QR	(Georgia (country)) Saburtalo Tbilisi	1–2	2–0	3–2
2019–20	UEFA Europa League	PO	(Luxembourg) F91 Dudelange	2–1	1–2	3–3 (4–5 p)
2020–21	UEFA Champions League	1QR	(Cyprus) Omonia	0–1		0–1 (a.e.t.)
2020–21	UEFA Europa League	2QR	(Luxembourg) Fola Esch	4–3		4–3 (a.e.t.)
2020–21	UEFA Europa League	3QR	(Slovenia) Celje	1–0		1–0 (a.e.t.)
2020–21	UEFA Europa League	PO	(Serbia) Red Star Belgrade	1–2		1–2
2022–23	UEFA Europa Conference League	2QR	(Estonia) Paide Linnameeskond	0–0	0–0	0–0 (3–5 p)
2023–24	UEFA Europa Conference League	1QR	(Albania) Egnatia	1–1	4–4	5–5 (4–2 p)
2023–24	UEFA Europa Conference League	2QR	(Greece) Aris Thessaloniki	1–1	0–1	1–2
2024–25	UEFA Conference League	2QR	(Moldova) Zimbru Chișinău	3–1	3–0	6–1
2024–25	UEFA Conference League	3QR	(Hungary) Puskás Akadémia	0–1	3–3	3–4
2025–26	UEFA Conference League	2QR	(Romania) Universitatea Cluj	0–0	2–1	2–1
2025–26	UEFA Conference League	3QR	(Czech Republic) Sparta Prague	1–2	1–4	2–6
2026–27	UEFA Champions League	1QR	(Latvia) Riga	2–0	2–3	4–3
2026–27	UEFA Champions League	2QR	(Republic of Ireland) Shamrock Rovers	2–0	1–2	3–2
2026–27	UEFA Champions League	3QR	(Slovenia) Celje	2–1	0–2	2–3
2026–27	UEFA Europa League	PO	(Romania) Universitatea Craiova	1–0	1–1	2–1
2026–27	UEFA Europa League	LP	(Czech Republic) Sparta Prague	1–4	—N/a	
2026–27	UEFA Europa League	LP	(Poland) Jagiellonia Białystok	—N/a	1–3	
2026–27	UEFA Europa League	LP	(Netherlands) AZ Alkmaar	0–4	—N/a	
2026–27	UEFA Europa League	LP	(Portugal) Torreense	—N/a	2–3	
2026–27	UEFA Europa League	LP	(Austria) Red Bull Salzburg	—N/a		
2026–27	UEFA Europa League	LP	(Netherlands) NEC Nijmegen		—N/a	
2026–27	UEFA Europa League	LP	(Slovenia) Celje		—N/a	
2026–27	UEFA Europa League	LP	(Italy) AC Milan	—N/a		

== Player statistics ==
=== Appearances ===
As of match played 5 November 2026

	Name	Years	UEFA Champions League	UEFA Europa League	UEFA Europa Conference League	Total	Ratio
1	(Armenia) Karen Muradyan	2021–Present	6 (0)	6 (1)	13 (0)	25 (1)	0.04
2	(Russia) Armen Ambartsumyan	2018–Present	5 (0)	9 (0)	10 (0)	24 (0)	0
3	(Armenia) Junior Bueno (Note: Bueno was born in Colombia, but went on to represent Armenia at international level.)	2021–Present	6 (0)	3 (0)	14 (1)	23 (1)	0.04
3	(Armenia) Edgar Grigoryan	2023–Present	5 (0)	6 (0)	12 (0)	23 (0)	0
5	(Kenya) Alwyn Tera	2021-Present	5 (0)	3 (0)	13 (0)	21 (0)	0
6	(Armenia) Artur Serobyan	2020–Present	6 (1)	6 (0)	8 (3)	20 (4)	0.2
7	(Portugal) Hugo Oliveira	2025–Present	6 (1)	6 (0)	3 (0)	15 (1)	0.07
8	(Armenia) Zhirayr Shaghoyan	2017–Present	4 (1)	6 (0)	4 (0)	14 (1)	0.07
9	(Greece) Alexandros Malis	2025–Present	4 (0)	5 (1)	4 (0)	13 (1)	0.08
10	(Portugal) Ângelo Meneses	2019-2021	3 (0)	9 (0)	(-)	12 (0)	0
10	(Netherlands) Furdjel Narsingh	2019-2022	3 (0)	9 (0)	(-)	12 (0)	0
10	(Cape Verde) Mailson Lima (Note: Lima was born in Netherlands, but went on to represent Cape Verde at international level.)	2019-2021, 2021-2023	2 (0)	8 (5)	2 (0)	12 (5)	0.42
10	(Armenia) Kamo Hovhannisyan	2024–Present	3 (0)	1 (0)	8 (1)	12 (1)	0.08
10	(Brazil) João Bravim	2026–Present	6 (0)	6 (0)	(-)	12 (0)	0
10	(Portugal) Bruno Wilson	2026–Present	6 (0)	6 (2)	(-)	12 (1)	0.08
10	(Brazil) Sandro Lima	2026–Present	6 (3)	6 (1)	(-)	12 (4)	0.33
10	(Brazil) França	2026–Present	6 (2)	6 (0)	(-)	12 (2)	0.17
18	(Guinea-Bissau) Zidane Banjaqui (Note: Banjaqui was born in Portugal, but went on to represent Guinea-Bissau at international level.)	2026–Present	6 (1)	5 (1)	(-)	11 (2)	0.18
18	(Colombia) Juan Balanta	2025–Present	1 (0)	6 (0)	4 (2)	11 (2)	0.18
20	(Ivory Coast) Kódjo	2019-2020	3 (0)	7 (1)	(-)	10 (1)	0.1
20	(Burkina Faso) Zakaria Sanogo	2019-2022	3 (0)	7 (0)	(-)	10 (0)	0
20	(Brazil) Alemão	2020–2024	1 (0)	3 (0)	6 (1)	10 (1)	0.1
20	(Nigeria) Tenton Yenne	2022–2025	(-)	(-)	10 (2)	10 (2)	0.2
20	(Colombia) Jonathan Duarte	2022–2026	(-)	(-)	10 (2)	10 (2)	0.2
25	(Nigeria) Ogana Louis	2019-2021	2 (0)	7 (2)	(-)	9 (2)	0.22
25	(France) Maxence Carlier	2026–Present	4 (0)	5 (0)	(-)	9 (0)	0
27	(Armenia) Petros Avetisyan	2019-2020	2 (2)	6 (1)	(-)	8 (1)	0.13
27	(Morocco) Rochdi Achenteh (Note: Achenteh was born in Netherlands, but went on to represent Morocco at international level.)	2019-2020	2 (0)	6 (0)	(-)	8 (0)	0
27	(Bulgaria) Georgi Pashov	2018-2019	2 (0)	6 (0)	(-)	8 (0)	0
27	(Kenya) Amos Nondi	2023–2025	(-)	(-)	8 (0)	8 (0)	0
27	(Portugal) João Queirós	2024–2026	(-)	(-)	8 (0)	8 (0)	0
27	(Nigeria) Matthew Gbomadu	2023–2026	(-)	(-)	8 (0)	8 (0)	0
33	(Russia) Anton Kobyalko	2018-2020	2 (1)	5 (3)	(-)	7 (3)	0.43
33	(Estonia) Ilja Antonov	2019-2020	2 (0)	5 (1)	(-)	7 (1)	0.14
33	(Russia) Dmitry Guz	2018-2020	2 (0)	5 (0)	(-)	7 (0)	0
33	(Armenia) Gor Malakyan	2018-2020	1 (0)	6 (0)	(-)	7 (0)	0
33	(Serbia) Stefan Čupić	2019-2021	1 (0)	6 (0)	(-)	7 (0)	0
33	(Portugal) Benny	2026–Present	1 (0)	6 (0)	(-)	7 (0)	0
39	(Russia) Vsevolod Ermakov	2022–2024	(-)	(-)	6 (0)	6 (0)	0
39	(Armenia) Artyom Avanesyan	2018–2024	0 (0)	0 (0)	6 (0)	6 (0)	0
39	(Armenia) Arayik Eloyan	2022–Present	0 (0)	3 (0)	3 (0)	6 (0)	0
41	(Russia) Dmitry Abakumov	2018-2023	2 (0)	3 (0)	(-)	5 (0)	0
41	(Ivory Coast) Wilfried Eza	2021–2023	(-)	(-)	5 (2)	5 (2)	0.4
41	(Senegal) Alioune Ndour	2026–Present	5 (0)	(-)	(-)	5 (0)	0
45	(Armenia) Sargis Shahinyan	2020-2022	1 (0)	3 (0)	(-)	4 (0)	0
45	(France) Yoan Gouffran	2020-2021	1 (0)	3 (0)	(-)	4 (0)	0
45	(Nigeria) Yusuf Otubanjo	2020-2022	1 (0)	3 (0)	(-)	4 (0)	0
45	(Ukraine) Serhiy Vakulenko	2020-2022	1 (0)	3 (2)	(-)	4 (2)	0.5
45	(Armenia) Hakob Hakobyan	2022–2026	(-)	(-)	4 (0)	4 (0)	0
45	(Brazil) Cássio Scheid	2023–2024	(-)	(-)	4 (0)	4 (0)	0
45	(Portugal) Adriano Castanheira	2023–2024	(-)	(-)	4 (1)	4 (1)	0.25
45	(Armenia) Hovhannes Harutyunyan	2017–2018, 2019–2021, 2024–2025	(-)	(-)	4 (1)	4 (1)	0.25
45	(Argentina) Alexis Rodríguez	2024–2025	(-)	(-)	4 (0)	4 (0)	0
45	(Ghana) Eric Ocansey	2024–2025	(-)	(-)	4 (2)	4 (2)	0.5
45	(Portugal) Bruno Pinto	2025–2026	(-)	(-)	4 (0)	4 (0)	0
45	(Brazil) João Lima	2025–2026	(-)	(-)	4 (0)	4 (0)	0
45	(Armenia) Misak Hakobyan	2021–Present	(-)	(-)	4 (0)	4 (0)	0
45	(Brazil) Luis Felipe	2026–Present	3 (0)	1 (0)	(-)	4 (0)	0
59	(Haiti) Alex Junior Christian	2019-2021	1 (0)	2 (0)	(-)	3 (0)	0
59	(North Macedonia) Aleksandar Damchevski	2018-2021	1 (0)	2 (0)	(-)	3 (0)	0
59	(Spain) David Bollo	2020-2021	1 (0)	2 (0)	(-)	3 (0)	0
59	(Peru) Jeisson Martínez	2020-2021	0 (0)	3 (1)	(-)	3 (1)	0.33
59	(Ghana) Paul Ayongo	2025–Present	2 (0)	(-)	1 (1)	3 (1)	0.33
59	(Armenia) Michel Ayvazyan	2022–Present	2 (0)	(-)	1 (0)	3 (0)	0
65	(Brazil) Romércio	2022-2023	(-)	(-)	2 (0)	2 (0)	0
65	(Portugal) Hugo Firmino	2022-2023	(-)	(-)	2 (0)	2 (0)	0
65	(Brazil) Agdon Menezes	2022–2024	(-)	(-)	2 (0)	2 (0)	0
65	(Armenia) Solomon Udo (Note: Udo was born in Nigeria, but went on to represent Armenia at international level.)	2022-2023	(-)	(-)	2 (0)	2 (0)	0
65	(Colombia) Carlos Pérez	2023	(-)	(-)	2 (0)	2 (0)	0
65	(Armenia) Arsen Beglaryan (Note: Beglaryan was born in Russia, but went on to represent Armenia at international level.)	2023–2025	(-)	(-)	2 (0)	2 (0)	0
65	(Ukraine) Danylo Kucher	2024–2025	(-)	(-)	2 (0)	2 (0)	0
65	(Brazil) Welton	2025–2026	(-)	(-)	2 (0)	2 (0)	0
65	(Portugal) Bruno Pereira	2026–Present	0 (0)	1 (0)	(-)	2 (0)	0
74	(Armenia) Artur Danielyan (Note: Danielyan was born in Ukraine, but went on to represent Armenia U21 at international level.)	2018-2021	0 (0)	1 (0)	(-)	1 (0)	0
74	(Armenia) Arman Hovhannisyan	2018-2019, 2022-2023	(-)	(-)	1 (0)	1 (0)	0
74	(Armenia) Wbeymar (Note: Wbeymar was born in Colombia, but went on to represent Armenia at international level.)	2020–Present	0 (0)	0 (0)	1 (0)	1 (0)	0
74	(Armenia) Davit Terteryan	2020–2024	(-)	(-)	1 (0)	1 (0)	0
74	(Armenia) Arman Nersesyan	2019–Present	0 (0)	1 (0)	0 (0)	1 (0)	0

=== Goalscorers ===
As of match played 5 November 2026

	Name	Years	UEFA Champions League	UEFA Europa League	UEFA Europa Conference League	Total	Ratio
1	(Cape Verde) Mailson Lima	2019-2021, 2021-2023	0 (2)	5 (8)	0 (2)	5 (12)	0.42
2	(Russia) Anton Kobyalko	2018-2020	1 (2)	3 (5)	(-)	4 (7)	0.57
2	(Armenia) Artur Serobyan	2021–Present	1 (6)	0 (6)	3 (8)	4 (20)	0.2
2	(Brazil) Sandro Lima	2026–Present	3 (6)	1 (6)	(-)	4 (12)	0.33
5	(Armenia) Petros Avetisyan	2019-2020	2 (2)	1 (6)	(-)	3 (8)	0.38
6	(Nigeria) Ogana Louis	2019-2021	0 (2)	2 (7)	(-)	2 (9)	0.22
6	(Ukraine) Serhiy Vakulenko	2020-2022	0 (1)	2 (3)	(-)	2 (4)	0.5
6	(Ivory Coast) Wilfried Eza	2021–2023	(-)	(-)	2 (5)	2 (5)	0.4
6	(Ghana) Eric Ocansey	2024–2025	(-)	(-)	2 (4)	2 (4)	0.5
6	(Nigeria) Tenton Yenne	2022–2025	(-)	(-)	2 (10)	2 (10)	0.2
6	(Colombia) Jonathan Duarte	2022–2026	(-)	(-)	2 (10)	2 (10)	0.2
6	(Colombia) Juan Balanta	2025–Present	0 (1)	0 (6)	2 (4)	2 (11)	0.18
6	(Brazil) França	2026–Present	2 (6)	0 (6)	(-)	2 (12)	0.17
6	(Guinea-Bissau) Zidane Banjaqui	2026–Present	1 (6)	1 (5)	(-)	2 (11)	0.18
6	(Portugal) Bruno Wilson	2026–Present	0 (6)	2 (6)	(-)	2 (12)	0.17
16	(Ivory Coast) Kódjo	2019-2020	0 (3)	1 (7)	(-)	1 (10)	0.1
16	(Estonia) Ilja Antonov	2019-2020	0 (2)	1 (5)	(-)	1 (7)	0.14
16	(Peru) Jeisson Martínez	2020-2021	0 (0)	1 (3)	(-)	1 (3)	0.33
16	(Brazil) Alemão	2020–2024	0 (1)	0 (3)	1 (6)	1 (10)	0.1
16	(Portugal) Adriano Castanheira	2023–2024	(-)	(-)	1 (4)	1 (4)	0.25
16	(Armenia) Junior Bueno	2021–Present	0 (6)	0 (3)	1 (14)	1 (23)	0.04
16	(Armenia) Hovhannes Harutyunyan	2017–2018, 2019–2021, 2024–2025	(-)	(-)	1 (4)	1 (4)	0.25
16	(Armenia) Kamo Hovhannisyan	2024–Present	0 (3)	0 (1)	1 (8)	1 (12)	0.08
16	(Ghana) Paul Ayongo	2025–Present	0 (2)	(-)	1 (1)	1 (3)	0.33
16	(Portugal) Hugo Oliveira	2025–Present	1 (6)	0 (6)	0 (3)	1 (15)	0.07
16	(Armenia) Zhirayr Shaghoyan	2017–Present	1 (4)	0 (6)	0 (4)	1 (14)	0.07
16	(Greece) Alexandros Malis	2025–Present	0 (4)	1 (5)	0 (4)	1 (13)	0.08
16	(Armenia) Karen Muradyan	2021–Present	0 (6)	1 (6)	0 (13)	1 (25)	0.04

=== Clean sheets ===
As of match played 5 November 2026

	Name	Years	UEFA Champions League	UEFA Europa League	UEFA Europa Conference League	Total	Ratio
1	(Brazil) João Bravim	2026–Present	2 (6)	1 (6)	(-)	3 (12)	0.25
2	(Serbia) Stefan Čupić	2019-2021	0 (1)	2 (6)	(-)	2 (7)	0.29
2	(Russia) Vsevolod Ermakov	2022–2024	(-)	(-)	2 (6)	2 (6)	0.33
4	(Russia) Dmitry Abakumov	2018-2023	0 (2)	1 (3)	(-)	1 (5)	0.2
4	(Armenia) Arsen Beglaryan	2023–2025	(-)	0 (-)	1 (2)	1 (2)	0.5
4	(Portugal) Bruno Pinto	2025–2026	(-)	(-)	1 (4)	1 (4)	0.25
7	(Ukraine) Danylo Kucher	2023–2025	(-)	(-)	0 (2)	0 (2)	0
7	(Armenia) Arman Nersesyan	2019–Present	0 (0)	0 (1)	0 (0)	0 (1)	0

== Overall record ==
=== By competition ===
As of match played 5 November 2026

Competition	GP	W	D	L	GF	GA	+/-
UEFA Champions League	9	4	0	5	12	13	-1
UEFA Europa League	15	7	1	7	22	26	-4
UEFA Conference League	14	3	7	4	19	19	0
Total	38	14	8	16	53	58	-5

=== By country ===
As of match played 5 November 2026

Country	Pld	W	D	L	GF	GA	GD	Win%
Albania	2	0	2	0	5	5	+0	0.00
Austria	0	0	0	0	0	0	+0	—
Czech Republic	3	0	0	3	3	10	−7	0.00
Cyprus	1	0	0	1	0	1	−1	0.00
Estonia	2	0	2	0	0	0	+0	0.00
Georgia	2	1	0	1	3	2	+1	50.00
Gibraltar	2	2	0	0	4	1	+3	100.00
Greece	2	0	1	1	1	2	−1	0.00
Hungary	2	0	1	1	3	4	−1	0.00
Italy	0	0	0	0	0	0	+0	—
Latvia	2	1	0	1	4	3	+1	50.00
Luxembourg	3	2	0	1	7	6	+1	66.67
Moldova	2	2	0	0	6	1	+5	100.00
Netherlands	1	0	0	1	0	4	−4	0.00
Poland	1	0	0	1	1	3	−2	0.00
Portugal	1	0	0	1	2	3	−1	0.00
Republic of Ireland	2	1	0	1	3	2	+1	50.00
Romania	4	2	2	0	4	2	+2	50.00
Serbia	1	0	0	1	1	2	−1	0.00
Slovenia	3	2	0	1	3	3	+0	66.67
Sweden	2	1	0	1	3	4	−1	50.00

=== By club ===
As of match played 5 November 2026

Opponent	Played	Won	Drawn	Lost	For	Against	Difference	Ratio
(Italy) AC Milan	0	0	0	0	0	0	+0	—
(Sweden) AIK	2	1	0	1	3	4	−1	50.00
(Netherlands) AZ Alkmaar	1	0	0	1	0	4	−4	0.00
(Greece) Aris Thessaloniki	2	0	1	1	1	2	−1	0.00
(Slovenia) Celje	3	2	0	1	3	3	+0	66.67
(Albania) Egnatia	2	0	2	0	5	5	+0	0.00
(Luxembourg) F91 Dudelange	2	1	0	1	3	3	+0	50.00
(Luxembourg) Fola Esch	1	1	0	0	4	3	+1	100.00
(Poland) Jagiellonia Białystok	1	0	0	1	1	3	−2	0.00
(Gibraltar) Lincoln Red Imps	2	2	0	0	4	1	+3	100.00
(Netherlands) NEC Nijmegen	0	0	0	0	0	0	+0	—
(Cyprus) Omonia	1	0	0	1	0	1	−1	0.00
(Estonia) Paide Linnameeskond	2	0	2	0	0	0	+0	0.00
(Hungary) Puskás Akadémia	2	0	1	1	3	4	−1	0.00
(Austria) Red Bull Salzburg	0	0	0	0	0	0	+0	—
(Serbia) Red Star Belgrade	1	0	0	1	1	2	−1	0.00
(Latvia) Riga	2	1	0	1	4	3	+1	50.00
(Georgia (country)) Saburtalo Tbilisi	2	1	0	1	3	2	+1	50.00
(Republic of Ireland) Shamrock Rovers	2	1	0	1	3	2	+1	50.00
(Czech Republic) Sparta Prague	3	0	0	3	3	10	−7	0.00
(Portugal) Torreense	1	0	0	1	2	3	−1	0.00
(Romania) Universitatea Craiova	2	1	1	0	2	1	+1	50.00
(Romania) Universitatea Cluj	2	1	1	0	2	1	+1	50.00
(Moldova) Zimbru Chișinău	2	2	0	0	6	1	+5	100.00
