= 2025–26 FC Ararat-Armenia season =

Ararat-Armenia
2025-26 season
- Chairman: Rafik Hayrapetyan
- Manager: Tulipa
- Stadium: Academy Stadium; Vahagn Tumasyan Stadium
- Premier League: Champions
- Armenian Cup: Semi-final
- Armenian Supercup: Runnersup
- UEFA Conference League: Third qualifying round vs Sparta Prague
- Top goalscorer: League: Artur Serobyan (7); Arayik Eloyan (7); All: Artur Serobyan (7); Arayik Eloyan (7); Juan Balanta (7)
Home colours	Away colours

The 2025–26 season was FC Ararat-Armenia's 8th season in Armenian Premier League.

== Season overview ==
On 2 June, Ararat-Armenia announced that both Tenton Yenne and Danylo Kucher had left the club after their contracts had expired.

On 3 June 2025, Ararat-Armenia announced the appointment of Tulipa as their new head coach. Later the same day, Ararat-Armenia announced that Romércio had left the club after his contract had expired.

On 6 June, Ararat-Armenia announced that Aleksandr Pavlovets, Eric Ocansey and Marius Noubissi had all left the club.

On 9 June, Ararat-Armenia announced the signing of Alexandros Malis from AEK Athens B.

On 10 June, Ararat-Armenia announced the signing of Paul Ayongo from Chaves.

On 11 June, Ararat-Armenia announced the signing of Bruno Pinto from Felgueiras.

On 12 June, Ararat-Armenia announced the signing of Welton from Berço.

On 13 June, Ararat-Armenia announced the signing of Juan Balanta from SCU Torreense, and that Arman Nersesyan and Arayik Eloyan had returned from loan deals with BKMA Yerevan.

On 14 June, Ararat-Armenia announced that Misak Hakobyan had joined Egnatia Rrogozhinë on loan for a year.

On 15 June, Ararat-Armenia announced that they had extended their contracts with Kamo Hovhannisyan and Alwyn Tera for another season.

On 17 June, Ararat-Armenia announced the signing of Hugo Oliveira from Vizela.

On 19 June, Ararat-Armenia announced the signing of João Lima from Santa Clara.

On 5 July, Ararat-Armenia announced that they had agreed to the mutual termination of their contracts with Henri Avagyan and Amos Nondi.

On 21 July, Ararat-Armenia announced that Arayik Eloyan and Arman Nersesyan had both extended their contracts with the club until the summer of 2028.

On 22 July, Ararat-Armenia announced that Vahram Makhsudyan and Misak Hakobyan had both extended their contracts with the club until the summer of 2028.

On 15 August, Ararat-Armenia announced the signing of Rodrigo Ramos from Estoril Praia on a contract until the summer of 2028.

On 6 January, Ararat-Armenia announced that Jonathan Duarte had left the club after his contract had expired.

On 14 January, Ararat-Armenia announced the signing of Bouchaib Arrassi from Raja CA on loan for the remainder of the season.

On 21 January, Ararat-Armenia announced the signing of Alioune Ndour from Zulte Waregem on a contract until 2028.

On 28 January, Ararat-Armenia announced the signing of Zidane Banjaqui from Panserraikos.

On 2 February, Ararat-Armenia announced that Matthew Gbomadu had left the club in order to sign permanently for Estrela da Amadora, and that João Lima had left the club to join Feirense on loan for the remainder of the season.

On 25 February, Ararat-Armenia announced that they would play their home games at the Vahagn Tumasyan Stadium in Abovyan for the remainder of the season.

== Squad ==
As of match played 27 May 2026

Number	Name	Nationality	Position	Date of birth (age)	Signed from	Signed in	Contract ends	Apps.	Goals
Goalkeepers
1	Arman Nersesyan	(Armenia)	GK	19 October 2001 (aged 24)	Academy	2019	2028	12	0
12	Shirak Badalyan	(Armenia)	GK	2 April 2006 (aged 20)	Academy	2024		0	0
24	Bruno Pinto	(Portugal)	GK	9 June 1992 (aged 33)	Felgueiras	2025		24	0
	Hayk Khachatryan	(Armenia)	GK	27 January 2005 (aged 21)	Academy	2021		0	0
Defenders
2	Hugo Oliveira	(Portugal)	DF	10 February 2002 (aged 24)	Vizela	2025		30	6
3	Junior Bueno (Note: Junior Bueno was born in Colombia, but qualified to represent Armenia, making his debut in March 2026.)	(Armenia)	DF	3 September 1996 (aged 29)	Once Caldas	2021		157	3
4	João Queirós	(Portugal)	DF	22 April 1998 (aged 28)	Mafra	2024		68	3
5	Hakob Hakobyan (Note: Hakob Hakobyan was born in Georgia, but qualified to represent Armenia, making his debut in November 2020.)	(Armenia)	DF	29 March 1997 (aged 29)	Urartu	2022		61	2
13	Kamo Hovhannisyan	(Armenia)	DF	5 October 1992 (aged 33)	Unattached	2024	2026	80	3
16	Edgar Grigoryan	(Armenia)	DF	25 August 1998 (aged 27)	Unattached	2023		113	0
33	Bouchaib Arrassi	(Morocco)	DF	6 January 2000 (aged 26)	on loan from Raja CA	2026	2026	5	0
47	Alexandros Malis	(Greece)	DF	19 March 1997 (aged 29)	AEK Athens B	2025		21	0
Midfielders
8	Juan Balanta	(Colombia)	MF	3 March 1997 (aged 29)	SCU Torreense	2025		25	7
10	Armen Ambartsumyan	(Russia)	MF	11 April 1994 (aged 32)	Fakel Voronezh	2018		247	17
11	Zidane Banjaqui (Note: Zidane Banjaqui was born in Portugal, but qualified to represent Guinea-Bissau, making his debut in June 2020.)	(Guinea-Bissau)	MF	15 December 1998 (aged 27)	Panserraikos	2026		16	3
19	Karen Muradyan	(Armenia)	MF	11 November 1992 (aged 33)	Ararat Yerevan	2021		174	1
20	Alwyn Tera	(Kenya)	MF	18 January 1997 (aged 29)	Saburtalo Tbilisi	2021	2026	167	9
27	Davit Petrosyan	(Armenia)	MF	2 March 2005 (aged 21)	Academy	2022		0	0
28	Davit Barseghyan	(Armenia)	MF	3 January 2005 (aged 21)	Unattached	2024		0	0
36	Vahram Makhsudyan	(Armenia)	MF	22 January 2003 (aged 23)	Academy	2024	2028	4	0
44	Vahe Petrosyan	(Armenia)	MF	31 August 2005 (aged 20)	Academy	2023		1	0
88	Welton	(Brazil)	MF	22 November 1998 (aged 27)	Berço	2025		24	1
Forwards
7	Zhirayr Shaghoyan	(Armenia)	FW	10 April 2001 (aged 25)	Academy	2017		133	24
9	Arayik Eloyan	(Armenia)	FW	16 March 2004 (aged 22)	Academy	2022	2028	30	7
25	Alioune Ndour	(Senegal)	FW	21 October 1997 (aged 28)	Zulte Waregem	2026	2028	16	6
77	Artur Serobyan	(Armenia)	FW	2 July 2003 (aged 22)	Academy	2020		101	25
90	Paul Ayongo	(Ghana)	FW	16 November 1996 (aged 29)	Chaves	2025		26	5
Away on loan
21	Narek Alaverdyan	(Armenia)	MF	19 February 2002 (aged 24)	Youth Team	2019		12	0
22	Misak Hakobyan	(Armenia)	FW	11 June 2004 (aged 21)	Academy	2021	2028	5	0
99	João Lima	(Brazil)	MF	11 May 2000 (aged 26)	Santa Clara	2025		11	1
	Michel Ayvazyan	(Armenia)	MF	21 June 2005 (aged 20)	Academy	2022		12	1
Left during the season
11	Jonathan Duarte	(Colombia)	FW	25 May 1997 (aged 29)	Orsomarso	2022		101	17
17	Matthew Gbomadu	(Nigeria)	FW	16 October 2004 (aged 21)	FDC Vista	2023		69	9
30	Rodrigo Ramos	(Portugal)	FW	13 November 2003 (aged 22)	Estoril Praia	2025	2028	9	0

== Transfers ==
=== In ===
Date	Position	Nationality	Name	From	Fee	Ref.
9 June 2025	DF	(Greece)	Alexandros Malis	AEK Athens B	Undisclosed	
10 June 2025	FW	(Ghana)	Paul Ayongo	Chaves	Undisclosed	
11 June 2025	GK	(Portugal)	Bruno Pinto	Felgueiras	Undisclosed	
12 June 2025	MF	(Brazil)	Welton	Berço	Undisclosed	
13 June 2025	MF	(Colombia)	Juan Balanta	SCU Torreense	Undisclosed	
17 June 2025	DF	(Portugal)	Hugo Oliveira	Vizela	Undisclosed	
19 June 2025	FW	(Brazil)	João Lima	Santa Clara	Undisclosed	
15 August 2025	FW	(Portugal)	Rodrigo Ramos	Estoril Praia	Undisclosed	
21 January 2026	FW	(Senegal)	Alioune Ndour	Zulte Waregem	Undisclosed	
28 January 2026	MF	(Guinea-Bissau)	Zidane Banjaqui	Panserraikos	Undisclosed	

=== Loans in ===
Date from	Position	Nationality	Name	To	Date to	Ref.
14 January 2026	DF	(Morocco)	Bouchaib Arrassi	Raja CA	End of season	

=== Out ===
Date	Position	Nationality	Name	To	Fee	Ref.
2 February 2026	FW	(Nigeria)	Matthew Gbomadu	Estrela da Amadora	Undisclosed	
5 March 2026	FW	(Portugal)	Rodrigo Ramos	Dinamo Tbilisi	Undisclosed	

=== Loans out ===
Date from	Position	Nationality	Name	To	Date to	Ref.
14 January 2025	FW	(Armenia)	Artur Serobyan	Sheriff Tiraspol	16 August 2025	
14 June 2025	FW	(Armenia)	Misak Hakobyan	Egnatia Rrogozhinë	18 July 2025	
17 January 2026	FW	(Armenia)	Misak Hakobyan	Noah	31 December 2026	
2 February 2026	MF	(Brazil)	João Lima	Feirense	End of season	

=== Released ===
Date	Position	Nationality	Name	Joined	Date	Ref
2 June 2025	GK	(Ukraine)	Danylo Kucher	Concordia Chiajna		
2 June 2025	FW	(Nigeria)	Tenton Yenne	Baltika Kaliningrad	2 June 2025	
3 June 2025	DF	(Brazil)	Romércio	Inter de Limeira	7 July 2025	
6 June 2025	DF	(Belarus)	Aleksandr Pavlovets	Dynamo Brest	21 June 2025	
6 June 2025	FW	(Ghana)	Eric Ocansey	Pyunik	15 July 2025	
6 June 2025	FW	(Cameroon)	Marius Noubissi	Pyunik	2 July 2025	
5 July 2025	GK	(Armenia)	Henri Avagyan	Pyunik	5 July 2025	
5 July 2025	MF	(Kenya)	Amos Nondi	Partizani Tirana	11 August 2025	
8 July 2025	GK	(Armenia)	Rafael Manasyan	Nevėžis	23 July 2025	
6 January 2026	FW	(Colombia)	Jonathan Duarte			

== Friendlies ==
28 June 2025	Ararat-Armenia	3–1	Shirak
(UTC+4)	Lima; Gbomadu; Barseghyan	Report	Goal

2 July 2025	Kolkheti-1913 Poti	0–1	Ararat-Armenia	Georgia
12:00 (UTC+4)		Report	Gbomadu

4 July 2025	Dinamo Tbilisi	0–0	Ararat-Armenia	Tbilisi, Georgia
18:00 (UTC+4)		Report		Stadium: Boris Paichadze Dinamo Arena
Note: Match played behind closed doors.

9 July 2025	Telavi	2–4	Ararat-Armenia	Georgia
11:00 (UTC+4)	Goal	Report	Lima; Gbomadu; M.Hakobyan; Grigoryan

12 July 2025	Ararat-Armenia	5–2	Van	Yerevan
10:00 (UTC+4)	Eloyan; H.Hakobyan (o.g.); Duarte; Tera	Report	Goal	Stadium: Academy Stadium

17 July 2025	Ararat-Armenia	3–4	Alashkert	Yerevan
(UTC+4)	João Lima (pen.); Gbomadu; Eloyan	Report	Goal	Stadium: Academy Stadium

7 September 2025	Ararat-Armenia	2–0	Alashkert	Yerevan
(UTC+4)	Gbomadu; Duarte	Report		Stadium: Academy Stadium

28 January 2026	Ararat-Armenia	3–2	Vejle	Ayia Napa, Cyprus
16:30 (UTC+4)		Report

1 February 2026	Ararat-Armenia	0–0	Botev Vratsa	Ayia Napa, Cyprus
(UTC+4)		Report

6 February 2026	Ararat-Armenia	0–1	Lyngby	Ayia Napa, Cyprus
(UTC+4)		Report

7 February 2026	Ararat-Armenia	2–0	Banga Gargždai	Ayia Napa, Cyprus
(UTC+4)	Makhsudyan; Eloyan	Report

12 February 2026	Ararat-Armenia	4–1	Hørsholm-Usserød	Ayia Napa, Cyprus
(UTC+4)	Banjaqui; Ayongo; Queirós; Eloyan	Report	Goal

15 February 2026	Ararat-Armenia	0–1	Torpedo Kutaisi	Ayia Napa, Cyprus
(UTC+4)		Report	Goal

18 February 2026	Ararat-Armenia	3–2	HIK	Ayia Napa, Cyprus
17:00 (UTC+4)	Eloyan; Ndour; Tera	Report	Goal

== Competitions ==
=== Overview ===
Competition	First match	Last match	Starting round	Final position	Record							
Competition	First match	Last match	Starting round	Final position	Pld	W	D	L	GF	GA	GD	Win %
Premier League	4 August 2025	27 May 2026	Matchday 1	Winners	27	18	6	3	50	25	+25	66.67
Armenian Cup	4 March 2026	29 April 2026	Quarter-final	Semi-final	4	2	1	1	3	1	+2	50.00
Armenian Supercup	12 March 2026	12 March 2026	Final	Runnersup	1	0	1	0	1	1	+0	0.00
UEFA Conference League	24 July 2025	14 August 2025	Second qualifying round	Third qualifying round	4	1	1	2	4	7	−3	25.00
Total					36	21	9	6	58	34	+24	58.33

Last updated: 27 May 2026
Source: Competitions

=== Armenian Supercup ===
12 March 2025	Noah	1–1 (a.e.t.) (4–2 p)	Ararat-Armenia	Yerevan
19:00 (UTC+4)	Ferreira 37' (pen.)	Report	Banjaqui 10'; Muradyan (yellow card) 38'; Ndour (yellow card) 71'; Bueno (yellow card) 80'	Stadium: Republican Stadium; Referee: Zaven Hovhannisyan
	Penalties
	Ferreira (penalty scored); Manvelyan (penalty scored); Jakoliš (penalty scored); Mulahusejnović (penalty scored)		(penalty scored) Oliveira; (penalty scored) Ayongo; (penalty missed) Eloyan; (penalty missed) Shaghoyan

=== Premier League ===
==== Results summary ====
Overall								Home						Away					
Pld	W	D	L	GF	GA	GD	Pts	W	D	L	GF	GA	GD	W	D	L	GF	GA	GD
27	18	6	3	50	25	+25	60	10	3	1	26	13	+13	8	3	2	24	12	+12

Last updated: 27 May 2026.
Source: See Results

==== Results by round ====
Round	1	4	5	6	7	2	8	9	10	11	3	12	13	14	15	17	18	19	20	21	22	23	24	16	25	26	27
Ground	A	A	H	A	H	H	A	H	A	H	A	H	A	A	H	A	H	A	H	A	A	H	A	H	H	A	H
Result	D	W	W	W	D	W	D	D	W	W	W	D	W	L	W	L	W	D	D	W	W	W	W	W	L	W	W
Position	7	6	3	2	3	2	4	2	2	2	1	2	1	1	1	1	1	2	2	1	1	1	1	1	1	1	1

Updated to match(es) played on 27 May 2026. Source: See Results
A = Away; H = Home; W = Win; D = Draw; L = Loss; P = Bye

==== Results ====
4 August 2025 1	Van	0–0	Ararat-Armenia	Charentsavan
17:30 (UTC+4)	Afajanyan (yellow card) 23'; James (yellow card) 45+4'; Minasyan (yellow card) 65'; Granado (yellow card) 81'; N.Manukyan (yellow card) 84'; G.Manukyan (yellow card) 90+1'	Report	Eloyan (yellow card) 45+4'	Stadium: City Stadium; Referee: Vardan Manukyan

24 August 2025 4	Shirak	0–1	Ararat-Armenia	Gyumri
18:00 (UTC+4)	Mkrtchyan (yellow card) 59'; R.Hakobyan (yellow card) 62'; Hovhannesyan (yellow card) 90+6'	Report	Queirós (yellow card) 90+8'; Eloyan 90+9'	Stadium: City Stadium; Referee: Yura Mahtesyan

30 August 2025 5	Ararat-Armenia	4–2	Ararat Yerevan	Yerevan
19:00 (UTC+4)	Fofana 25' (o.g.); Muradyan (yellow card) 47'; Balanta (yellow card) 58'; Queirós 77'; Bueno (yellow card) 78'; Eloyan 86'; Gbomadu 90'; Hovhannisyan (yellow card) 90+7'	Report	Moustapha 21'; Meite 39'; Khachumyan (yellow card) 62'; Anzimati-Aboudou (yellow card) 78'	Stadium: Academy Stadium; Referee: Sargis Khachatryan

14 September 2025 6	Urartu	2–3	Ararat-Armenia	Yerevan
19:00 (UTC+4)	Vardanyan (yellow card) 40'; Michel 74' (pen.), 86' (pen.); Israelyan (yellow card) 89'	Report	Balanta 19'; Bueno (yellow card) 30'; Eloyan (yellow card) 45+1'; Muradyan (yellow card) 46'; Shaghoyan 69'; Oliveira (yellow card) 76'; Margaryan 79' (o.g.); Welton (yellow card) 90+2'	Stadium: Urartu Stadium; Referee: Zaven Hovhannisyan

20 September 2025 7	Ararat-Armenia	2–2	Noah	Yerevan
18:00 (UTC+4)	Welton (red card) 5'; Oliveira 32'; Grigoryan (yellow card) 34'; Serobyan 77' (yellow card) 82'; Gbomadu (yellow card) 90+7'	Report	Mulahusejnović 22', 51'; Manvelyan (yellow card) 45+4'; Jakoliš (yellow card) 45+6' (yellow-red card) 68'; Sualehe (yellow card) 82'; Oshima (yellow card) 83'; Pinson (red card) 87'; Čančarević (yellow card) 88'	Stadium: Academy Stadium; Referee: Henrik Nalbandian

25 September 2025 2	Ararat-Armenia	2–1	Alashkert	Yerevan
19:00 (UTC+4)	Eloyan 32'; Oliveira 56'; Malis (yellow card) 74'; Ramos (yellow card) 77'; Ayongo (yellow card) 85'	Report	Piloyan (yellow card) 39'; Nalbandyan 90+5' (pen.)	Stadium: Academy Stadium; Referee: Ashot Ghaltakhchyan
Note: Match originally scheduled for 11 August.

29 September 2025 8	BKMA Yerevan	2–2	Ararat-Armenia	Yerevan
19:00 (UTC+4)	Ha.Sargsyan (yellow card) 4'; Petrosyan (yellow card) 43'; N.Hovhannisyan 48', 90+9' (pen.); Ayvazyan (yellow card) 89'	Report	H.Hakobyan (yellow card) 35'; Muradyan (yellow card) 42'; Queirós (yellow card) 43'; Balanta 45+5' (pen.), 73' (pen.); Serobyan (yellow card) 62'; Oliveira (yellow card) 86'	Stadium: Academy Stadium; Referee: Vardan Manukyan

5 October 2025 9	Ararat-Armenia	1–0	Gandzasar Kapan	Yerevan
17:00 (UTC+4)	Serobyan 10' (yellow card) 75'; Shaghoyan (yellow card) 30'; Eloyan (yellow card) 46'; Bueno (yellow card) 90+4'	Report	Ajibona (yellow card) 23'; Khachatryan (yellow card) 26'; Pa.Avetisyan (yellow card) 90'	Stadium: Academy Stadium; Referee: Ashot Harutyunyan

19 October 2025 10	Gandzasar Kapan	0–1	Ararat-Armenia	Yerevan
17:00 (UTC+4)	Ajibona (yellow card) 59'; Pa.Avetisyan (yellow card) 76'; Voskanyan (yellow card) 90+5'	Report	Eloyan (yellow card) 70'; Hovhannisyan 81'	Stadium: Junior Sport Stadium; Referee: Zaven Hovhannisyan

25 October 2025 11	Ararat-Armenia	2–1	BKMA Yerevan	Yerevan
19:00 (UTC+4)	Shaghoyan (yellow card) 38'; A.Petrosyan 46' (o.g.); Grigoryan (yellow card) 85'; Ayongo 86'	Report	Bueno 16' (o.g.); A.Hakobyan (yellow card) 85'; Afyan (yellow card) 88'	Stadium: Academy Stadium; Referee: Artem Gasparyan

1 November 2025 12	Noah	1–2	Ararat-Armenia	Abovyan
19:00 (UTC+4)	Ferreira (yellow card) 47' (goal) 48'; Muradyan (yellow card) 66'; Mulahusejnović (yellow card) 81'; Sangaré (yellow card) 85'	Report	Shaghoyan 21'; Queirós (yellow card) 47'; Eloyan (yellow card) 56'; Bueno (yellow card) 80'; Ambartsumyan 86'; Lima (yellow card) 89'; Balanta (yellow card) 90+1'; Welton (yellow card) 90+4'	Stadium: Vahagn Tumasyan Stadium; Referee: Ashot Harutyunyan

8 November 2025 13	Ararat-Armenia	1–1	Urartu	Yerevan
18:00 (UTC+4)	Lima 37' (pen.); Grigoryan (yellow card) 46'; Hovhannisyan (yellow card) 54'; Bueno (yellow card) 59'; Nersesyan (yellow card) 87'; Welton (yellow card) 89'; Malis (yellow card) 90+2'	Report	Margaryan (yellow card) 14'; Agasaryan (yellow card) 61'; Gunko (yellow card) 83'; Michel 88' (pen.) (yellow card) 90+6'	Stadium: Academy Stadium; Referee: Zaven Hovhannisyan

21 November 2025 14	Ararat Yerevan	1–2	Ararat-Armenia	Yerevan
17:00 (UTC+4)	Sogodogo 89'	Report	Ambartsumyan 42'; Ramos (yellow card) 53'; Oliveira 62'	Stadium: Republican Stadium; Referee: Sargis Khachatryan

25 November 2025 3	Pyunik	1–0	Ararat-Armenia	Abovyan
18:00 (UTC+4)	Moreno 18'; Almeida (yellow card) 27'; Avagyan (yellow card) 78'; Kenourgios (yellow card) 80'; Kulikov (yellow card) 90'	Report	Malis (yellow card) 30'; Muradyan (yellow card) 45+3'; Queirós (yellow card) 45+4'	Stadium: Vahagn Tumasyan Stadium; Referee: Ashot Ghaltakhchyan
Note: Match originally scheduled to be played on 17 August at the Vahagn Tumasyan Sports Complex in Abovyan, but postponed on 12 August to accommodate Noah playing Gandzasar Kapan at the same stadium.

1 December 2025 15	Ararat-Armenia	4–1	Shirak	Yerevan
14:00 (UTC+4)	Balanta (penalty missed) 18'; Eloyan 45+4'; Oliveira 50'; Serobyan 66'; Bueno (yellow card) 85'; Ayongo 90+1'	Report	Mryan 41'; Sumbulyan (yellow card) 57'; Mkrtchyan (yellow card) 65'	Stadium: Academy Stadium; Referee: Artem Gasparyan
Note: Match suspended in the 26th minute on 30 November due to Flood Light failure, with the game resuming at 14:00 (UTC+4) in the 27th minute on 1 December.

7 March 2026 17	Alashkert	1–0	Ararat-Armenia	Yerevan
18:00 (UTC+4)	Nalbandyan (yellow card) 28'; Touré 57'; Piloyan (yellow card) 90+9'	Report	Bueno (yellow card) 16'; Eloyan (yellow card) 59'	Stadium: Republican Stadium; Referee: Artem Gasparyan

16 March 2026 18	Ararat-Armenia	3–0	Van	Abovyan
19:30 (UTC+4)	Banjaqui 15'; Ndour 27' (pen.); Serobyan 56'; Queirós (yellow card) 70'; Eloyan (yellow card) 90+3'	Report	Hovhannisyan (yellow card) 50'; Maurinho (yellow card) 69'	Stadium: Vahagn Tumasyan Stadium; Referee: Ashot Ghaltakhchyan

20 March 2026 19	Van	2–2	Ararat-Armenia	Charentsavan
15:30 (UTC+4)	Avetisyan 26' (pen.); Daniel (yellow card) 54'; Bokov (yellow card) 57'; Karapetyan 90+4'	Report	Daniel 62' (o.g.); Ndour 90+2' (pen.)	Stadium: City Stadium; Referee: Henrik Nalbandian

6 April 2026 20	Ararat-Armenia	1–1	Alashkert	Abovyan
19:00 (UTC+4)	Welton (yellow card) 51'; Ayongo 62'; Banjaqui (yellow card) 82'	Report	Matyukhin (yellow card) 33'; Terteryan 64'; Nalbandyan (yellow card) 67'	Stadium: Vahagn Tumasyan Stadium; Referee: Ashot Harutyunyan

11 April 2026 21	Pyunik	0–2	Ararat-Armenia	Yerevan
17:30 (UTC+4)	Yansané (yellow card) 90+5'; Santos (yellow card) 90+6'	Report	Balanta 24' (pen.); Hovhannisyan (yellow card) 74'; Pinto (yellow card) 82'; Muradyan (yellow card) 86'; Oliveira (yellow card) 90' (goal) 90+2'; Ndour (yellow card) 90+6'	Stadium: Academy Stadium; Referee: Artem Gasparyan

20 April 2026 22	Shirak	0–4	Ararat-Armenia	Gyumri
19:00 (UTC+4)	Vidić (yellow card) 51'	Report	Eloyan 4', 45'; Ambartsumyan (yellow card) 53'; Balanta 70'; Shaghoyan 83'	Stadium: City Stadium; Referee: Artak Vardanyan

25 April 2026 23	Ararat-Armenia	4–0	Ararat Yerevan	Abovyan
18:00 (UTC+4)	Serobyan 22', 28', 59'; Balanta (yellow card) 45'; Tera (yellow card) 66'; Ndour 85'	Report	Lima (yellow card) 50'	Stadium: Vahagn Tumasyan Stadium; Referee: Ashot Ghaltakhchyan

3 May 2026 24	Urartu	0–2	Ararat-Armenia	Yerevan
19:00 (UTC+4)	Velosa (yellow card) 42'; Mkrtchyan (yellow card) 70'; Michel (yellow card) 90+3'	Report	Hovhannisyan (yellow card) 24'; Grigoryan (yellow card) 47'; Ambartsumyan (yellow card) 55'; Serobyan (yellow card) 63'; Ndour 72', 90+4'; Queirós (yellow card) 84'; Nersesyan (yellow card) 90+5'	Stadium: Urartu Stadium; Referee: Ashot Harutyunyan

6 May 2026 16	Ararat-Armenia	1–0	Pyunik	Abovyan
16:30 (UTC+4)	Banjaqui 9'	Report	Hovhannisyan (yellow card) 59'	Stadium: Vahagn Tumasyan Stadium; Referee: Artem Gasparyan
Note: Match originally scheduled for 28 February 2026, but postponed on 27 February due to adverse weather conditions.

10 May 2026 25	Ararat-Armenia	0–4	Noah	Abovyan
18:00 (UTC+4)	Serobyan (yellow card) 24'	Report	Mulahusejnović 13'; Ferreira 18'; Aiás 85', 90+2'	Stadium: Vahagn Tumasyan Stadium; Referee: Ashot Ghaltakhchyan

17 May 2026 26	BKMA Yerevan	2–3	Ararat-Armenia	Yerevan
19:00 (UTC+4)	Arakelyan (yellow card) 13'; Hovhannisyan 25'; P.Manukyan (yellow card) 41'; Avetisyan 58'	Report	Eloyan 62'; Queirós 72'; Oliveira 84' (pen.) (yellow card) 90'	Stadium: Academy Stadium; Referee: Ashot Harutyunyan

27 May 2026 27	Ararat-Armenia	1–0	Gandzasar Kapan	Abovyan
19:00 (UTC+4)	Tera (yellow card) 33'; Shaghoyan 42'	Report	Voskanyan (yellow card) 38'; Nóbrega (yellow card) 73'	Stadium: Vahagn Tumasyan Stadium; Referee: Narek Hakobyan

==== League table ====
Pos	Team	Pld	W	D	L	GF	GA	GD	Pts	Qualification or relegation
1	Ararat-Armenia (C)	27	18	6	3	50	25	+25	60	Qualification for the Champions League first qualifying round
2	Noah	27	16	8	3	61	19	+42	56	Qualification for the Conference League second qualifying round (Note: The 2025–26 Armenian Cup winners (Noah) qualify for the Conference League second qualifying round.)
3	Pyunik	27	17	4	6	37	18	+19	55	Qualification for the Conference League first qualifying round
4	Alashkert	27	16	5	6	42	23	+19	53	Qualification for the Conference League first qualifying round
5	Urartu	27	14	7	6	43	26	+17	49	
6	Van	27	9	4	14	27	40	−13	31	
7	BKMA	27	4	11	12	30	42	−12	23	
8	Gandzasar Kapan	27	5	6	16	20	41	−21	21	
9	Ararat Yerevan	27	3	4	20	21	63	−42	13 (Note: Matches won: Ararat 3, Shirak 2)	
10	Shirak	27	2	7	18	17	51	−34	13	

Source: FFA
Rules for classification: 1) Points; 2) Head-to-head points; 3) Head-to-head goal difference; 4) Head-to-head goals scored; 5) Matches won; 6) Goal difference; 7) Less red cards; 8) Less yellow cards; 9) Fair-play ranking 10) Draw
(C) Champions

=== Armenian Cup ===
4 March 2026 Quarter-final 1st leg	Ararat-Armenia	1–0	Shirak	Yerevan
15:00 (UTC+4)	Tera (yellow card) 26'; Ndour 45+1'; Arrassi (yellow card) 80'; Hovhannisyan (yellow card) 82'; Eloyan (yellow card) 89'	Report	Mnatsakanyan (yellow card) 9'	Stadium: Junior Sport Stadium; Referee: Hovhannes Kalantaryan

2 April 2026 Quarter-final 2nd leg	Shirak	0–2 (0–3 agg.)	Ararat-Armenia	Gyumri
19:00 (UTC+4)	Pahlevanyan (yellow card) 8'; Kodia (yellow card) 31'; Misakyan (yellow card) 55'; Janoyan (yellow card) 66'	Report	Muradyan (yellow card) 60'; Ayongo 61'; Ndour (yellow card) 63'; Welton 77'	Stadium: City Stadium; Referee: Vardan Manukyan

16 April 2026 Semi-final 1st leg	Ararat-Armenia	0–1	Noah	Abovyan
18:30 (UTC+4)	Hovhannisyan (red card) 73'; Malis (yellow card) 73'; Queirós (yellow card) 90'	Report	Mulahusejnović 25' (yellow card) 51'; Saintini (red card) 73'; Sangaré (yellow card) 73'; Oshima (yellow card) 88'; Coneglian (yellow card) 90+5'; Hambardzumyan (yellow card) 90+10'	Stadium: Vahagn Tumasyan Stadium; Referee: Vardan Manukyan

29 April 2026 Semi-final 2nd leg	Noah	0–0 (1–0 agg.)	Ararat-Armenia	Abovyan
18:30 (UTC+4)	Zolotić (yellow card) 51'; Coneglian (yellow card) 80'; Khamoyan (yellow card) 84'	Report	Bueno (yellow card) 45'	Stadium: Vahagn Tumasyan Stadium; Referee: Zaven Yohannya

=== UEFA Conference League ===
==== Qualifying rounds ====
24 July 2025 Second qualifying round 1st leg	Ararat-Armenia	0–0	(Romania) Universitatea Cluj	Yerevan, Armenia
20:00 (UTC+4)	Duarte (yellow card) 82'	Report	Codrea (yellow card) 90+1'	Stadium: Academy Stadium; Attendance: 1,450; Referee: Dzmitry Dzmitryieu (Belarus)

31 July 2025 Second qualifying round 2nd leg	Universitatea Cluj (Romania)	1–2 (1–2 agg.)	Ararat-Armenia	Sibiu, Romania
21:00 (UTC+4)	Lukić 13'; Artean (yellow card) 85'; Drammeh (yellow card) 90+3'; Chipciu (yellow card) 109'; Codrea (yellow card) 119'	Report	Hovhannisyan 53'; Ayongo 117' (yellow card) 117'; Eloyan (yellow card) 119'; Grigoryan (yellow card) 120+3'	Stadium: Sibiu Municipal Stadium; Attendance: 10,158; Referee: David Fuxman (Israel)
Note: Universitatea Cluj will play their home match at the Sibiu Municipal Stadium in Sibui, instead of their regular stadium, Cluj Arena, in Cluj-Napoca, due to scheduling conflict with the Untold Festival.

7 August 2025 Third qualifying round 1st leg	Sparta Prague (Czech Republic)	4–1	Ararat-Armenia	Prague, Czech Republic
22:00 (UTC+4)	Haraslín 25'; Kairinen 33'; Ryneš (yellow card) 52'; Kuchta 60'; Birmančević 80' (pen.)	Report	Balanta 7'; Malis (yellow card) 37'; Queirós (yellow card) 88'	Stadium: Stadion Letná; Attendance: 17,316; Referee: Matthew MacDermid (Scotland)

14 August 2025 Third qualifying round 2nd leg	Ararat-Armenia	1–2 (2–6 agg.)	(Czech Republic) Sparta Prague	Yerevan, Armenia
20:00 (UTC+4)	Balanta 31' (pen.) (yellow card) 80'; Queirós (red card) 87'	Report	Rrahmani 23'; Ryneš (yellow card) 29'; Uchenna (yellow card) 61'; Haraslín (yellow card) 88'; Krasniqi 90+1'	Stadium: Academy Stadium; Attendance: 1,300; Referee: Jovan Kachevski (North Macedonia)

== Squad statistics ==
As of match played 27 May 2026

=== Appearances and goals ===
No.	Pos	Nat	Player	Total		Premier League		Armenian Cup		Supercup		Conference League	
No.	Pos	Nat	Player	Apps	Goals	Apps	Goals	Apps	Goals	Apps	Goals	Apps	Goals
1	GK	(Armenia) ARM	Arman Nersesyan	12	0	8	0	4	0	0	0	0	0
2	DF	(Portugal) POR	Hugo Oliveira	30	6	13+10	6	2+1	0	0+1	0	0+3	0
3	DF	(Armenia) ARM	Junior Bueno	32	0	22+1	0	4	0	1	0	4	0
4	DF	(Portugal) POR	João Queirós	32	2	25+1	2	2	0	0	0	4	0
5	DF	(Armenia) ARM	Hakob Hakobyan	11	0	3+5	0	1+2	0	0	0	0	0
7	FW	(Armenia) ARM	Zhirayr Shaghoyan	35	4	19+7	4	1+3	0	0+1	0	4	0
8	MF	(Colombia) COL	Juan Balanta	25	7	17+3	5	1	0	0	0	4	2
9	FW	(Armenia) ARM	Arayik Eloyan	30	7	17+6	7	1+2	0	0+1	0	0+3	0
10	MF	(Russia) RUS	Armen Ambartsumyan	28	2	11+12	2	0+3	0	0+1	0	1	0
11	MF	(Guinea) GUI	Zidane Banjaqui	16	3	8+3	2	4	0	1	1	0	0
13	DF	(Armenia) ARM	Kamo Hovhannisyan	30	2	17+5	1	2+1	0	1	0	4	1
16	DF	(Armenia) ARM	Edgar Grigoryan	33	0	22+3	0	3	0	1	0	4	0
19	MF	(Armenia) ARM	Karen Muradyan	31	0	19+3	0	3+1	0	1	0	4	0
20	MF	(Kenya) KEN	Alwyn Tera	30	0	15+8	0	3	0	1	0	0+3	0
24	GK	(Portugal) POR	Bruno Pinto	24	0	19	0	0	0	1	0	4	0
25	FW	(Senegal) SEN	Alioune Ndour	16	6	4+7	5	3+1	1	1	0	0	0
33	DF	(Morocco) MAR	Bouchaib Arrassi	5	0	2+1	0	1	0	1	0	0	0
36	MF	(Armenia) ARM	Vahram Makhsudyan	4	0	0+3	0	1	0	0	0	0	0
44	MF	(Armenia) ARM	Vahe Petrosyan	1	0	1	0	0	0	0	0	0	0
47	DF	(Greece) GRE	Alexandros Malis	21	0	10+5	0	2	0	0	0	2+2	0
77	FW	(Armenia) ARM	Artur Serobyan	27	7	22	7	2+2	0	1	0	0	0
88	MF	(Brazil) BRA	Welton	24	1	12+6	0	2+2	1	0	0	1+1	0
90	FW	(Ghana) GHA	Paul Ayongo	26	5	3+17	3	2+2	1	0+1	0	0+1	1
Players away on loan:
22	FW	(Armenia) ARM	Misak Hakobyan	5	0	1	0	0	0	0	0	0+4	0
99	MF	(Brazil) BRA	João Lima	11	1	3+4	1	0	0	0	0	4	0
Players who left Ararat-Armenia during the season:
11	FW	(Colombia) COL	Jonathan Duarte	7	0	3	0	0	0	0	0	0+4	0
17	FW	(Nigeria) NGR	Matthew Gbomadu	17	1	0+13	1	0	0	0	0	4	0
30	FW	(Portugal) POR	Rodrigo Ramos	9	0	1+8	0	0	0	0	0	0	0

=== Goal scorers ===
Place	Position	Nation	Number	Name	Premier League	Armenian Cup	Supercup	Conference League	Total
1	FW	(Armenia)	77	Artur Serobyan	7	0	0	0	7
1	FW	(Armenia)	9	Arayik Eloyan	7	0	0	0	7
1	MF	(Colombia)	8	Juan Balanta	5	0	0	2	7
4	DF	(Portugal)	2	Hugo Oliveira	6	0	0	0	6
4	FW	(Senegal)	25	Alioune Ndour	5	1	0	0	6
6	FW	(Ghana)	90	Paul Ayongo	3	1	0	1	5
7	FW	(Armenia)	7	Zhirayr Shaghoyan	4	0	0	0	4
7				Own goal	4	0	0	0	4
9	MF	(Guinea)	11	Zidane Banjaqui	2	0	1	0	3
10	MF	(Russia)	10	Armen Ambartsumyan	2	0	0	0	2
10	DF	(Portugal)	4	João Queirós	2	0	0	0	2
10	DF	(Armenia)	13	Kamo Hovhannisyan	1	0	0	1	2
13	FW	(Nigeria)	17	Matthew Gbomadu	1	0	0	0	1
13	MF	(Brazil)	99	João Lima	1	0	0	0	1
13	MF	(Brazil)	88	Welton	0	1	0	0	1
				TOTALS	50	3	1	4	58

=== Clean sheets ===
Place	Position	Nation	Number	Name	Premier League	Armenian Cup	Supercup	Conference League	Total
1	GK	(Portugal)	24	Bruno Pinto	8	0	0	1	9
2	GK	(Armenia)	1	Arman Nersesyan	3	3	0	0	6
				TOTALS	10	3	0	1	14

=== Disciplinary record ===
Number	Nation	Position	Name	Premier League		Armenian Cup		Supercup		Conference League		Total	
Number	Nation	Position	Name	Yellow card	Red card	Yellow card	Red card	Yellow card	Red card	Yellow card	Red card	Yellow card	Red card
1	(Armenia)	GK	Arman Nersesyan	2	0	0	0	0	0	0	0	2	0
2	(Portugal)	DF	Hugo Oliveira	4	0	0	0	0	0	0	0	4	0
3	(Armenia)	DF	Junior Bueno	7	0	1	0	1	0	0	0	9	0
4	(Portugal)	DF	João Queirós	6	0	1	0	0	0	1	1	8	1
5	(Armenia)	DF	Hakob Hakobyan	1	0	0	0	0	0	0	0	1	0
7	(Armenia)	FW	Zhirayr Shaghoyan	2	0	0	0	0	0	0	0	2	0
8	(Colombia)	MF	Juan Balanta	3	0	0	0	0	0	1	0	4	0
9	(Armenia)	FW	Arayik Eloyan	7	0	0	0	0	0	1	0	8	0
10	(Russia)	MF	Armen Ambartsumyan	2	0	0	0	0	0	0	0	2	0
11	(Guinea)	MF	Zidane Banjaqui	1	0	0	0	0	0	0	0	1	0
13	(Armenia)	DF	Kamo Hovhannisyan	4	0	1	1	0	0	0	0	5	1
16	(Armenia)	DF	Edgar Grigoryan	4	0	0	0	0	0	1	0	5	0
19	(Armenia)	MF	Karen Muradyan	5	0	1	0	1	0	1	0	8	0
20	(Kenya)	MF	Alwyn Tera	2	0	1	0	0	0	0	0	3	0
24	(Portugal)	GK	Bruno Pinto	1	0	0	0	0	0	0	0	1	0
25	(Senegal)	FW	Alioune Ndour	1	0	1	0	1	0	0	0	3	0
33	(Morocco)	DF	Bouchaib Arrassi	0	0	1	0	0	0	0	0	1	0
47	(Greece)	DF	Alexandros Malis	3	0	1	0	0	0	1	0	5	0
77	(Armenia)	FW	Artur Serobyan	5	0	0	0	0	0	0	0	5	0
88	(Brazil)	MF	Welton	4	1	0	0	0	0	0	0	4	1
90	(Ghana)	FW	Paul Ayongo	1	0	0	0	0	0	1	0	2	0
Players away on loan:
99	(Brazil)	MF	João Lima	1	0	0	0	0	0	0	0	1	0
Players who left Ararat-Armenia during the season:
11	(Colombia)	FW	Jonathan Duarte	0	0	0	0	0	0	1	0	1	0
17	(Nigeria)	FW	Matthew Gbomadu	1	0	0	0	0	0	0	0	1	0
30	(Portugal)	FW	Rodrigo Ramos	2	0	0	0	0	0	0	0	2	0
			TOTALS	68	1	8	1	3	0	8	1	87	3
