= Gonçalo Duarte =

Gonçalo Duarte may refer to:

- Gonçalo Duarte (footballer, born 1997), Portuguese footballer
- Gonçalo Duarte (footballer, born 1998), Portuguese footballer
