= Alexandros Malis =

Greek footballer

Personal information
- Date of birth: 19 March 1997 (age 29)
- Place of birth: Agrinio, Greece
- Height: 1.86 m (6 ft 1 in)
- Position: Centre-back

Team information
- Current team: Ararat-Armenia
- Number: 47

Youth career
- 2014–2016: Panetolikos

Senior career*
Years	Team	Apps	(Gls)
2016–2024	Panetolikos	99	(3)
2017–2018	→ Neos Amfilochos (loan)	21	(1)
2025	AEK Athens B	3	(0)
2025–	Ararat-Armenia	16	(0)
- * Club domestic league appearances and goals as of 18 August 2026

Alexandros Malis (Greek: Αλέξανδρος Μαλής; born 19 March 1997) is a Greek professional footballer who plays as a centre-back for Armenian Premier League club Ararat-Armenia.

== Career ==
=== Panetolikos ===
Malis began his career with the youth club of Panetolikos. He signed his first professional contract in July 2016.

He made his debut with Panetolikos on 4 January 2017 coming on in the 94th minute in a match against AEK Athens.

==== Loan to Neos Amfilochos ====
On 23 August 2017, Malis joined Neos Amfilochos on a one-year loan.

=== Ararat-Armenia ===
On 9 June 2025, Armenian Premier League club Ararat-Armenia announced the signing of Malis from AEK Athens B.

== Career statistics ==
=== Club ===
As of match played 15 August 2026.

Appearances and goals by club, season and competition
Club	Season	League			National cup (Note: Includes Armenian Cup)		Continental		Other		Total	
Club	Season	Division	Apps	Goals	Apps	Goals	Apps	Goals	Apps	Goals	Apps	Goals
Ararat-Armenia	2025–26	Armenian Premier League	15	0	2	0	4 (Note: Appearances in the UEFA Conference League)	0	0 (Note: Appearance in Armenian Super Cup)	0	21	0
Ararat-Armenia	2026–27	Armenian Premier League	1	0	0	0	4 (Note: Six appearances in the UEFA Champions League)	0	0	0	5	0
Ararat-Armenia	Total		16	0	2	0	8	0	0	0	26	0
Career total			16	0	2	0	8	0	0	0	26	0

== Honours ==
Ararat-Armenia

- Armenian Premier League: 2025–26
