= Alioune Ndour (footballer, born 1997) =

Senegalese footballer

Personal information
- Date of birth: 21 October 1997 (age 29)
- Place of birth: Dakar, Senegal
- Height: 1.83 m (6 ft 0 in)
- Positions: Right winger; forward

Team information
- Current team: Ararat-Armenia
- Number: 25

Senior career*
Years	Team	Apps	(Gls)
2016	Khor Fakkan		
2017–2019	Florø	36	(3)
2019–2020	Sogndal	37	(14)
2021–2022	Haugesund	44	(16)
2022–2026	Zulte Waregem	51	(10)
2024–2025	→ Kristiansund (loan)	32	(5)
2026–	Ararat-Armenia	18	(8)
- * Club domestic league appearances and goals as of 29 October 2026

Alioune "Badou" Ndour (born 21 October 1997) is a Senegalese professional footballer who plays as a forward for Armenian club Ararat-Armenia.

== Career ==
On 21 January 2026, Armenian Premier League club Ararat-Armenia announced the signing of Ndour from Zulte Waregem on a contract until 2028.

== Career statistics ==
=== Club ===
As of match played 29 October 2026

Appearances and goals by club, season and competition
Club	Season	League			National Cup		Continental		Other		Total	
Club	Season	Division	Apps	Goals	Apps	Goals	Apps	Goals	Apps	Goals	Apps	Goals
Florø	2017	OBOS-ligaen	11	0	0	0	–				11	0
Florø	2018	OBOS-ligaen	25	3	1	0	–				26	3
Florø	Total		36	3	1	0	–				37	3
Sogndal	2019	OBOS-ligaen	14	5	3	0	–				17	5
Sogndal	2020	OBOS-ligaen	23	9	0	0	–				23	9
Sogndal	Total		37	14	3	0	–				40	14
Haugesund	2021	Eliteserien	26	7	1	0	–				27	7
Haugesund	2022	Eliteserien	18	9	3	0	–				21	9
Haugesund	Total		44	16	4	0	–				48	16
Zulte Waregem	2022–23	Belgian First Division A	24	6	5	2	–				29	8
Zulte Waregem	2023–24	Challenger Pro League	24	4	2	0	–				26	4
Zulte Waregem	2024–25	Challenger Pro League	3	0	0	0	–				3	0
Zulte Waregem	Total		51	10	7	2	–				58	12
Kristiansund (loan)	2024	Eliteserien	8	2	0	0	–				8	2
Kristiansund (loan)	2025	Eliteserien	24	3	5	3	–				29	6
Kristiansund (loan)	Total		32	5	5	3	–				27	6
Ararat-Armenia	2025–26	Armenian Premier League	11	5	4	1	0	0	1	0	16	6
Ararat-Armenia	2026–27	Armenian Premier League	7	3	1	1	5	0	0	0	13	4
Ararat-Armenia	Total		18	8	5	2	5	0	1	0	29	10
Career total			218	56	25	7	5	0	1	0	249	63

== Honours ==
=== Player ===
Ararat-Armenia

- Armenian Premier League: 2025–26
