= Hugo Oliveira (footballer) =

Portuguese footballer (born 2002)

Personal information
- Full name: Hugo da Silva Oliveira
- Date of birth: 10 February 2002 (age 24)
- Place of birth: Fiães, Portugal
- Height: 1.74 m (5 ft 9 in)
- Position: Full-back

Team information
- Current team: Ararat-Armenia
- Number: 2

Youth career
- 2010–2011: Fiães
- 2011–2017: Porto
- 2017–2018: Padroense
- 2018–2019: Porto
- 2019–2020: Aves

Senior career*
Years	Team	Apps	(Gls)
2020–2021	Oliveirense	4	(0)
2021–2025	Vizela	18	(1)
2024–2025	→ Felgueiras (loan)	3	(0)
2025–	Ararat-Armenia	30	(6)
- * Club domestic league appearances and goals as of 22 September 2026

Hugo da Silva Oliveira (born 10 February 2002) is a Portuguese footballer who plays as a full-back for Armenian Premier League club FC Ararat-Armenia.

== Football career ==
He made his professional debut for Oliveirense on 22 January 2021 in the Liga Portugal 2.

On 17 June 2025, Armenian Premier League club Ararat-Armenia announced the signing of Oliveira from Vizela.

== Career statistics ==
=== Club ===
As of match played 16 September 2026.

Appearances and goals by club, season and competition
Club	Season	League			National cup (Note: Includes Armenian Cup)		Continental		Other		Total	
Club	Season	Division	Apps	Goals	Apps	Goals	Apps	Goals	Apps	Goals	Apps	Goals
Ararat-Armenia	2025–26	Armenian Premier League	23	6	3	0	3 (Note: Appearances in UEFA Conference League)	0	1 (Note: Appearance in Armenian Super Cup)	0	30	6
Ararat-Armenia	2026–27	Armenian Premier League	7	0	0	0	9 (Note: Six appearances and one goal in the UEFA Champions League, three appearances and zero goals in the UEFA Europa League)	1	0	0	16	1
Ararat-Armenia	Total		30	6	3	0	12	1	1	0	46	7
Career total			30	6	3	0	12	1	1	0	46	7

== Honours ==
=== Player ===
Ararat-Armenia

- Armenian Premier League: 2025–26
