= Gonçalo Duarte (footballer, born 1997) =

Portuguese footballer

Personal information
- Full name: Gonçalo Alexandre Silva Duarte
- Date of birth: 11 July 1997 (age 29)
- Place of birth: Baixa da Banheira, Portugal
- Height: 1.77 m (5 ft 10 in)
- Position: Defender

Team information
- Current team: Marítimo Sub-23
- Number: 2

Youth career
- 2005–2008: Fabril Barreiro
- 2008–2013: Barreirense
- 2013–2016: Vitória de Setúbal

Senior career*
| Years | Team | Apps | (Gls) |
| 2016–2018 | Vitória de Setúbal | 0 | (0) |
| 2017 | → Gil Vicente (loan) | 1 | (0) |
| 2018 | → SG Sacavenense (loan) | 12 | (0) |
| 2018– | Marítimo B | 5 | (0) |

International career
| 2015 | Portugal U19 | 2 | (0) |
- * Club domestic league appearances and goals as of 17 February 2019

Gonçalo Alexandre Silva Duarte (born 11 July 1997) is a Portuguese footballer who plays for C.S. Marítimo Sub-23, as a defender.

== Club career ==
On 23 August 2017, Duarte made his professional debut with Gil Vicente in a 2017–18 LigaPro match against União Madeira.
