= Sandro Perković =

Croatian football coach (born 1984)

Personal information
- Date of birth: 15 April 1984 (age 42)
- Place of birth: Sisak, SR Croatia, Yugoslavia

Team information
- Current team: Noah (manager)

Managerial career
- Years: Team
- 2017–2018: Ilzer
- 2021–2022: Akritas Chlorakas
- 2022–2023: Riga
- 2024: Dinamo Zagreb (caretaker)
- 2025: Dinamo Zagreb (caretaker)
- 2025–: Noah

Sandro Perković (born 15 April 1984) is a Croatian professional football manager and former player. He is currently the manager of the Armenian Premier League side Noah.

== Coaching career ==
Perković began his coaching career in 2015 as the U15 head coach of Austrian club Ilzer. He stayed in the club for three years, working his way up to the position of the head coach for the first team. In 2018, he became the academy head coach of Sturm Graz.

After Austria, Perković continued his career in Cyprus. He was the assistant coach and head analyst for Željko Kopić at Pafos from October 2018 to November 2019. His first coaching tenure at Dinamo Zagreb began in 2020 as the assistant coach for the U18 team.

One year later, in June 2021, Perković returned to Cyprus as the head coach of Akritas Chlorakas. He had a successful run at the club and achieved a promotion to the highest level of the Cypriot national league. From January until June 2022, he was back at Dinamo Zagreb as the assistant coach of the first team, working with Ante Čačić who was the head coach at the time. In that period, he won his first Croatian Football League championship.

Perković became the head coach of Riga in June 2022. He achieved 2.35 points per match in the national league and the club was 1st in the ranking from the day he took over the club until the end of the season. He also achieved 2.17 points per match in the UEFA Conference League.

His third tenure at Dinamo Zagreb started in January 2023, once again as the assistant coach of the first team, this time with Sergej Jakirović as the head coach. He has won three league titles, one Croatian Football Cup and one Croatian Football Super Cup with Dinamo. He was also a caretaker coach for two games in 2024, until the arrival of Nenad Bjelica as the head coach, and finished the 2024–25 season in charge of Dinamo after Fabio Cannavaro's dismissal.

He has coaching experience in all three UEFA club competitions - UEFA Champions League, UEFA Europa League and UEFA Conference League.

== Honours ==
Noah

- Armenian Cup: 2025–26
- Armenian Supercup: 2025

Individual

- Armenian Premier League Manager of the Month: September 2025
