= Zidane Banjaqui =

Bissau-Guinean footballer (born 1998)

Personal information
- Full name: Zidane Agustini Banjaqui
- Date of birth: 15 December 1998 (age 27)
- Place of birth: Lisbon, Portugal
- Height: 1.75 m (5 ft 9 in)
- Positions: Midfielder; winger

Team information
- Current team: Ararat-Armenia
- Number: 11

Youth career
- 2007–2010: Real
- 2010–2012: Sporting CP
- 2012–2015: Real
- 2015–2017: Benfica

Senior career*
Years	Team	Apps	(Gls)
2017–2018	Benfica B	1	(0)
2017–2018	→ Mirandela (loan)	22	(2)
2018–2020	Desportivo Aves B	52	(5)
2019–2020	Desportivo Aves	23	(1)
2020–2021	B-SAD B	10	(0)
2021–2022	Casa Pia	38	(1)
2022–2023	Mafra	12	(2)
2023–2025	Feirense	57	(9)
2025–2026	Panserraikos	13	(0)
2026–	Ararat-Armenia	18	(2)

International career^{‡}
2022–	Guinea-Bissau	9	(2)
- * Club domestic league appearances and goals as of 4 June 2025 ‡ National team caps and goals as of 21:00, 9 June 2025 (UTC)

Zidane Agustini Banjaqui (born 15 December 1998) is a professional footballer who plays as a midfielder or winger for Armenian Premier League club Ararat-Armenia. Born in Portugal, he represents Guinea-Bissau at international level.

== Early life ==
Born in Lisbon, Portugal, he is the older brother of Portugal U18 international Daniel Banjaqui and Portuguese footballer Figo Banjaqui.

== Club career ==
On 28 January 2026, Armenian Premier League club Ararat-Armenia announced the signing of Banjaqui from Panserraikos.

== Career statistics ==
=== Club ===
As of match played 15 October 2026

Appearances and goals by club, season and competition
Club	Season	League			National cup (Note: Includes KNVB Cup, Copa do Brasil, Taça de Portugal)		Continental		Other		Total	
Club	Season	Division	Apps	Goals	Apps	Goals	Apps	Goals	Apps	Goals	Apps	Goals
Ararat-Armenia	2025–26	Armenian Premier League	11	2	4	0	0 (Note: Appearances in the UEFA Conference League)	0	1 (Note: Appearance in Armenian Super Cup)	1	16	3
Ararat-Armenia	2026–27	Armenian Premier League	7	0	0	0	10 (Note: Six appearances and one goal in the UEFA Champions League, four appearances and one goal in the UEFA Europa League)	2	0	0	17	2
Ararat-Armenia	Total		18	2	4	0	10	2	1	1	33	5
Career total			18	2	4	0	10	2	1	1	33	5

== Honours ==
=== Player ===
Ararat-Armenia

- Armenian Premier League: 2025–26
