= Tulipa (Portuguese footballer) =

Portuguese football manager and former player

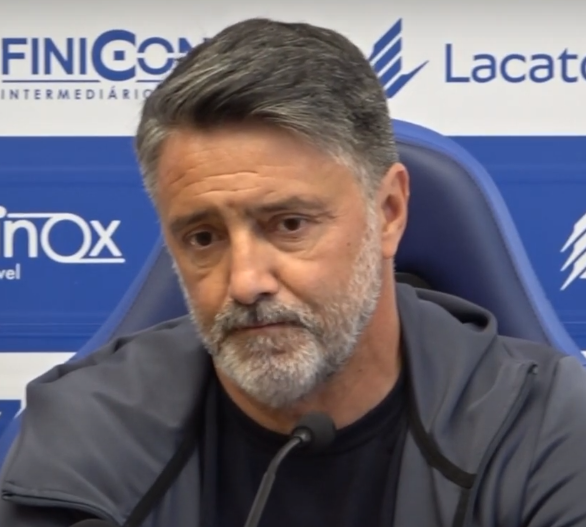
- Tulipa in 2023

Personal information
- Full name: Manuel Jorge da Silva Cruz
- Date of birth: 16 October 1972 (age 54)
- Place of birth: Vila Nova de Gaia, Portugal
- Height: 1.72 m (5 ft 8 in)
- Position: Midfielder

Team information
- Current team: Ararat-Armenia (manager)

Youth career
- 1982–1986: Avintes
- 1986–1991: Porto

Senior career*
Years	Team	Apps	(Gls)
1991–1992	Rio Ave	32	(4)
1992–1993	Paços Ferreira	28	(4)
1993–1994	Salgueiros	25	(6)
1994–1996	Belenenses	33	(6)
1994–1995	→ Salgueiros (loan)	21	(6)
1996–1997	Boavista	17	(0)
1997	Salamanca	7	(0)
1998	Salgueiros	17	(1)
1998–1999	Marítimo	23	(2)
1999–2000	Farense	19	(0)
2000–2002	Badajoz	39	(2)
2002–2003	Felgueiras	29	(6)
2003–2005	Vilanovense	33	(1)
Total		323	(38)

International career
1991	Portugal U20	5	(0)
1993–1994	Portugal U21	8	(0)
1995–1996	Portugal	3	(0)

Managerial career
- 2006: Ovarense
- 2006–2007: Ribeirão
- 2007–2008: Estoril
- 2008–2009: Trofense
- 2010: Chaves
- 2011–2012: Covilhã
- 2015: Ribeirão
- 2019–2020: Porto (youth)
- 2021–2022: Marítimo (under-23)
- 2022–2023: Vizela (under-23)
- 2022–2023: Vizela (interim)
- 2023: Marítimo
- 2023–2024: Torreense
- 2025–: Ararat-Armenia
Medal record
Men's football
Representing Portugal
FIFA U-20 World Cup
Winner	1991 Portugal
UEFA European Under-21 Championship
Runner-up	1994 France
FIFA U-17 World Cup
Third place	1989 Scotland
UEFA European Under-17 Championship
Winner	1989 Denmark
- * Club domestic league appearances and goals

Manuel Jorge da Silva Cruz (born 16 October 1972), known as Tulipa, is a Portuguese former professional footballer who played as a midfielder. He is currently manager of Armenian Premier League club Ararat-Armenia.

He totalled 183 games and 25 goals in the Primeira Liga, for Paços de Ferreira, Salgueiros (three spells), Belenenses, Boavista, Marítimo and Farense. Abroad, he played in La Liga for Salamanca.

Tulipa began working as a manager in 2005, leading Trofense and Vizela in the top flight.

== Club career ==
Born in Vila Nova de Gaia, Porto metropolitan area, Tulipa spent much of his youth at FC Porto but never made a first-team appearance. He was one of several Portuguese imports at Spanish club UD Salamanca as they competed in La Liga in the late 1990s, with Pauleta among his compatriot colleagues.

In July 2000, after a season at S.C. Farense, Tulipa returned across the border, signing a two-year deal at CD Badajoz in the Segunda División. In 41 total appearances for the Extremadura side, he scored twice, both against Levante UD in his latter season; the first goal set off a late comeback for a 2–2 home draw, the second was a 94th-minute winner.

== International career ==
Tulipa earned 31 caps for Portugal up to under-21 level and scored four goals. He was part of the under-20 squad that won the 1991 FIFA World Youth Championship on home soil.

Tulipa played three times for the senior side, all in friendlies, starting on 29 January 1995 when he came on as a 70th-minute substitute for Rui Bento in a 1–0 victory over Denmark in the SkyDome Cup.

== Coaching career ==
Tulipa began working as a manager at Segunda Liga side A.D. Ovarense in the second half of the 2005–06 season, suffering relegation. After a year in the third division with G.D. Ribeirão, he signed a one-year deal with G.D. Estoril Praia in May 2007.

After finishing in seventh in the second tier, Tulipa was given another year in charge in July 2008. However, on 25 September he left abruptly for C.D. Trofense, replacing Toni Conceição at a team in last place in their debut campaign in the top flight but not being able to move them into a higher position.

Tulipa was then out of work until March 2010, when he was appointed at second-division G.D. Chaves following the resignation of Nuno Pinto. In April, his side won 3–1 on aggregate after extra time in the semi-finals of the Taça de Portugal against Associação Naval 1º de Maio to reach the final for the first time, losing the decisive match 2–1 to FC Porto on 16 May; the domestic campaign ended with descent, however.

In February 2011, Tulipa returned to the second tier in charge of S.C. Covilhã initially until 30 June, only resigning the following year in April with the team in last place. In 2015, he spent a few weeks back at Ribeirão, who were eventually relegated from the third league.

Tulipa became manager of Porto's under-19s, the reigning champions of the UEFA Youth League, on 5 July 2019. Two years later, he was appointed at Marítimo's under-23 side.

On 3 October 2022, Tulipa signed with F.C. Vizela in the same capacity. In December, he replaced the dismissed Álvaro Pacheco at the first team on an interim basis. After leading the team to a record 40 points and 11th place, he left in May 2023.

Tulipa returned to Marítimo on 16 June 2023, this time taking charge of the main squad who had just been relegated to division two. On 5 December, with his side sitting sixth in the table after 12 matches, he was sacked.

On 12 December 2023, Tulipa was appointed at fellow second-tier S.C.U. Torreense. The following May, having managed a seventh place, he left as his contract expired.

On 3 June 2025, Armenian Premier League club FC Ararat-Armenia announced the signing of Tulipa as new head coach. He won the national championship in his first season.

== Honours ==
=== Player ===
Boavista

- Taça de Portugal: 1996–97

Portugal U20

- FIFA U-20 World Cup: 1991

=== Manager ===
Ararat-Armenia

- Armenian Premier League: 2025–26

Individual

- Armenian Premier League Manager of the Month: October 2025
