= Juan Balanta =

Colombian footballer (born 1997)

Personal information
- Full name: Juan Andrés Balanta Palacios
- Date of birth: 3 March 1997 (age 29)
- Place of birth: Caloto, Colombia
- Height: 1.72 m (5 ft 8 in)
- Positions: Midfielder; winger

Team information
- Current team: Ararat-Armenia
- Number: 8

Youth career
- Deportivo Cali

Senior career*
Years	Team	Apps	(Gls)
2014–2016	Deportivo Cali	15	(1)
2017	Cúcuta Deportivo	18	(1)
2018	Jaguares de Córdoba	3	(0)
2019	Tauro	14	(1)
2019–2020	AD Oliveirense	21	(4)
2020–2022	Canelas	52	(5)
2022–2025	Torreense	83	(5)
2025–	Ararat-Armenia	20	(5)
- * Club domestic league appearances and goals as of 28 May 2026

Juan Andrés Balanta Palacios (born 3 March 1997) is a Colombian professional footballer who plays as a midfielder or winger for Armenian Premier League club Ararat-Armenia.

== Career ==
On 2 July 2022, Balanta signed with Liga Portugal 2 club Torreense.

=== Ararat-Armenia ===
On 9 June 2025, Armenian Premier League club Ararat-Armenia announced the signing of Balanta from SCU Torreense.

== Honours ==
=== Player ===
Ararat-Armenia

- Armenian Premier League: 2025–26
