= João Marcos (footballer, born 2000) =

Brazilian footballer

Personal information
- Full name: João Marcos Lima Candido
- Date of birth: 11 May 2000 (age 26)
- Place of birth: Araguaína, Brazil
- Height: 1.80 m (5 ft 11 in)
- Position: Forward

Team information
- Current team: Tondela
- Number: 9

Youth career
- 2015–2017: Vila Nova
- 2017–2020: Goiás

Senior career*
Years	Team	Apps	(Gls)
2020–2021	Goiás	4	(1)
2021–2022	Al Wahda	6	(1)
2022	→ Al Dhafra (loan)	10	(0)
2022–2024	Santa Clara	19	(1)
2023	→ B-SAD (loan)	15	(5)
2024	→ Leixões (loan)	13	(1)
2024–2025	Alverca	25	(4)
2025–2026	Ararat-Armenia	7	(1)
2026	→ Feirense (loan)	10	(1)
2026–	Tondela	6	(2)
- * Club domestic league appearances and goals as of 12 September 2026

João Marcos Lima Candido (born 11 May 2000) is a Brazilian professional footballer who plays as a forward for Liga Portugal 2 club Tondela.

== Club career ==
João Marcos is a youth product of Vila Nova and Goiás. He was promoted to the senior team of Goiás in 2020. He made his professional debut with Goiás in a 2–1 Campeonato Brasileiro Série A loss to Grêmio on 30 November 2020, scoring his side's only goal. He moved to the United Arab Emirates with Al Wahda ahead of the 2021-22 season. He joined Al Dhafra on loan in January 2022 for the second half of the season. On 14 August 2022, he transferred to the Primeira Liga sided Santa Clara signing a 3-year contract.

On 31 January 2023, João Marcos was loaned to B-SAD until the end of the 2022–23 season.

On 21 January 2024, Santa Clara sent João Marcos on loan until the end of the season to fellow Liga Portugal 2 club Leixões.

On 19 June 2025, Armenian Premier League club Ararat-Armenia announced the signing of Lima from Santa Clara. On 2 February 2026, Ararat-Armenia announced that Lima had left the club to join Feirense on loan for the remainder of the season.

== Career statistics ==
As of match played 29 December 2022

Appearances and goals by club, season and competition
Club	Season	League			Cup		League Cup		Continental		Other		Total	
Club	Season	Division	Apps	Goals	Apps	Goals	Apps	Goals	Apps	Goals	Apps	Goals	Apps	Goals
Goiás	2020	Série A	4	1	0	0	—		—		—		4	1
Al Wahda	2020–21	UAE Pro League	2	0	0	0	—		—		—		2	0
Al Wahda	2021–22	UAE Pro League	13	1	4	1	—		—		—		19	2
Al Wahda	Total		15	1	4	1	—		—		—		21	2
Santa Clara	2022–23	Primeira Liga	4	0	1	0	3	0	—		—		8	0
Career total			23	2	5	0	3	0	0	0	0	0	33	3
