= Paul Ayongo =

Ghanaian footballer (born 1996)

Personal information
- Date of birth: 16 November 1996 (age 29)
- Place of birth: Accra, Ghana
- Height: 1.78 m (5 ft 10 in)
- Position: Forward

Team information
- Current team: Ararat-Armenia
- Number: 90

Youth career
- –2014: Charity Stars
- 2014: Oeiras

Senior career*
Years	Team	Apps	(Gls)
2014–2015	Oeiras		
2015–2018	Amarante	73	(29)
2018–2019	Paços de Ferreira	10	(4)
2019–2020	→ Mafra (loan)	21	(2)
2020–2022	Académico de Viseu	61	(14)
2022–2023	Central Coast Mariners	9	(1)
2023–2024	Swift Hesperange	6	(1)
2024	União de Leiria	15	(2)
2024–2025	Chaves	22	(3)
2025–	Ararat-Armenia	20	(3)
- * Club domestic league appearances and goals as of 28 May 2026

Paul Ayongo (born 16 November 1996) is a Ghanaian professional footballer who plays as a forward for Armenian Premier League club Ararat-Armenia.

== Career ==
Ayongo made his professional debut with Paços de Ferreira in a 3–2 Taça da Liga win over Académico de Viseu on 28 July 2018.

In July 2022, Ayongo joined Australian club Central Coast Mariners as a foreign player on a two-year deal. He scored once in nine appearances, before announcing his departure to the staff and was rumoured to join a Romanian club.

In July 2023, Ayongo joined Luxembourgian club Swift Hesperange and made his debut for them in the first qualifying round of the 2023–24 UEFA Champions League against Slovan Bratislava.

On 3 January 2024, Ayongo returned to Portugal, joining Liga Portugal 2 club União de Leiria on a contract until 2025.

On 10 June 2025, Armenian Premier League club Ararat-Armenia announced the signing of Ayongo.

== Honours ==
=== Player ===
Ararat-Armenia

- Armenian Premier League: 2025–26
