= Artur Serobyan =

Armenian footballer

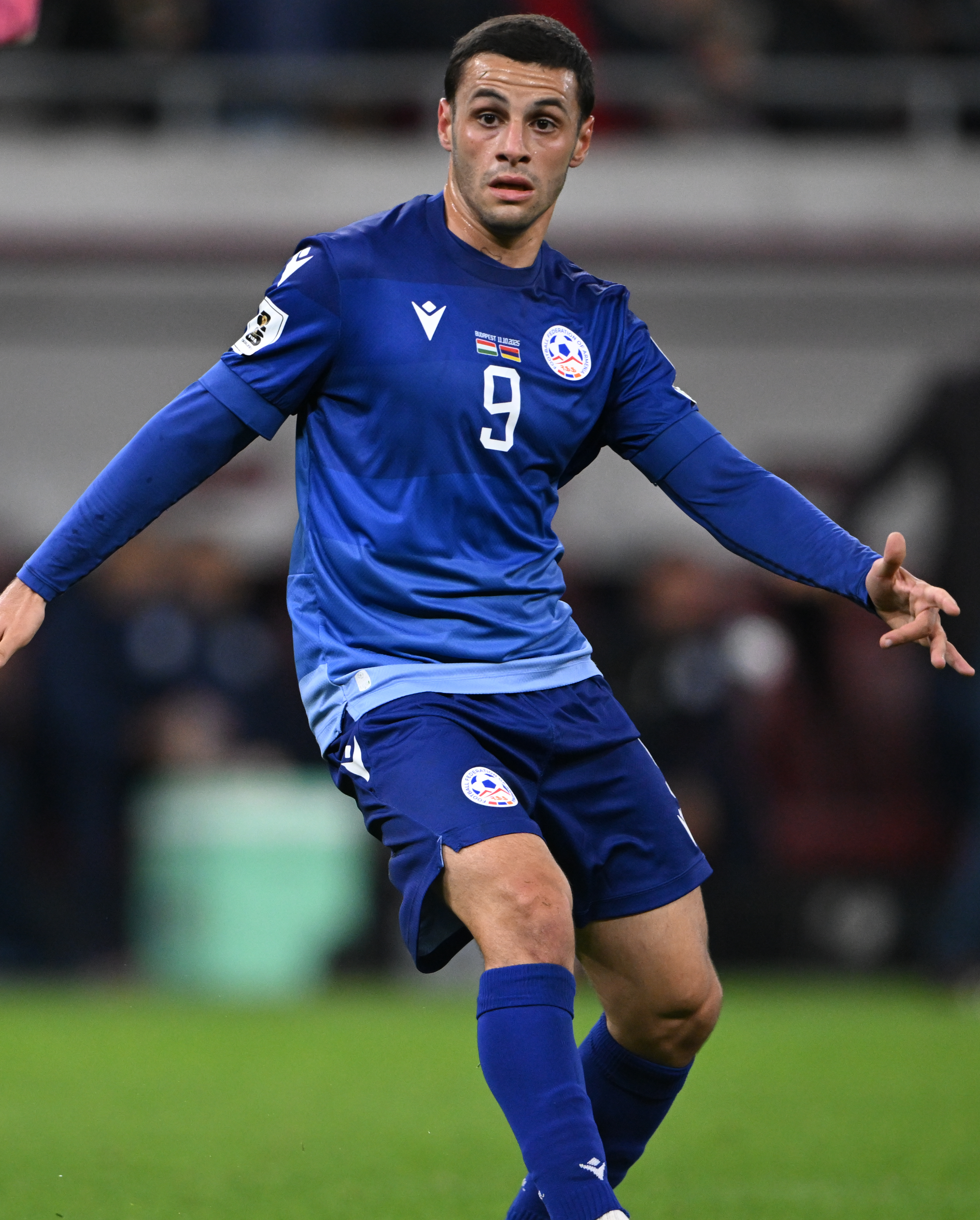
- Serobyan in 2025

Personal information
- Date of birth: 2 July 2003 (age 23)
- Place of birth: Yerevan, Armenia
- Height: 1.81 m (5 ft 11 in)
- Positions: Winger; forward

Team information
- Current team: Ararat-Armenia
- Number: 77

Youth career
- FC Avan Academy

Senior career*
Years	Team	Apps	(Gls)
2020–	Ararat-Armenia	92	(22)
2021–2022	→ BKMA Yerevan (loan)	43	(4)
2023–2024	→ Casa Pia (loan)	2	(0)
2025	→ Sheriff Tiraspol (loan)	14	(2)

International career^{‡}
2019	Armenia U16	1	(0)
2019	Armenia U17	3	(0)
2021	Armenia U19	3	(1)
2021	Armenia U21	4	(0)
2022–	Armenia	33	(2)
- * Club domestic league appearances and goals as of 15:40, 9 November 2026 (UTC) ‡ National team caps and goals as of 17:43, 15 November 2026 (UTC)

Artur Serobyan (Armenian: Արթուր Սերոբյան, born 2 July 2003) is an Armenian professional footballer who plays as a winger or forward for Armenian Premier League club Ararat-Armenia and the Armenia national team. He will join I liga club Lechia Gdańsk in February 2027.

== Club career ==
Artur Serobyan is a graduate of the Yerevan Football Academy. At the age of 17, he already played in the senior team of Ararat-Armenia.

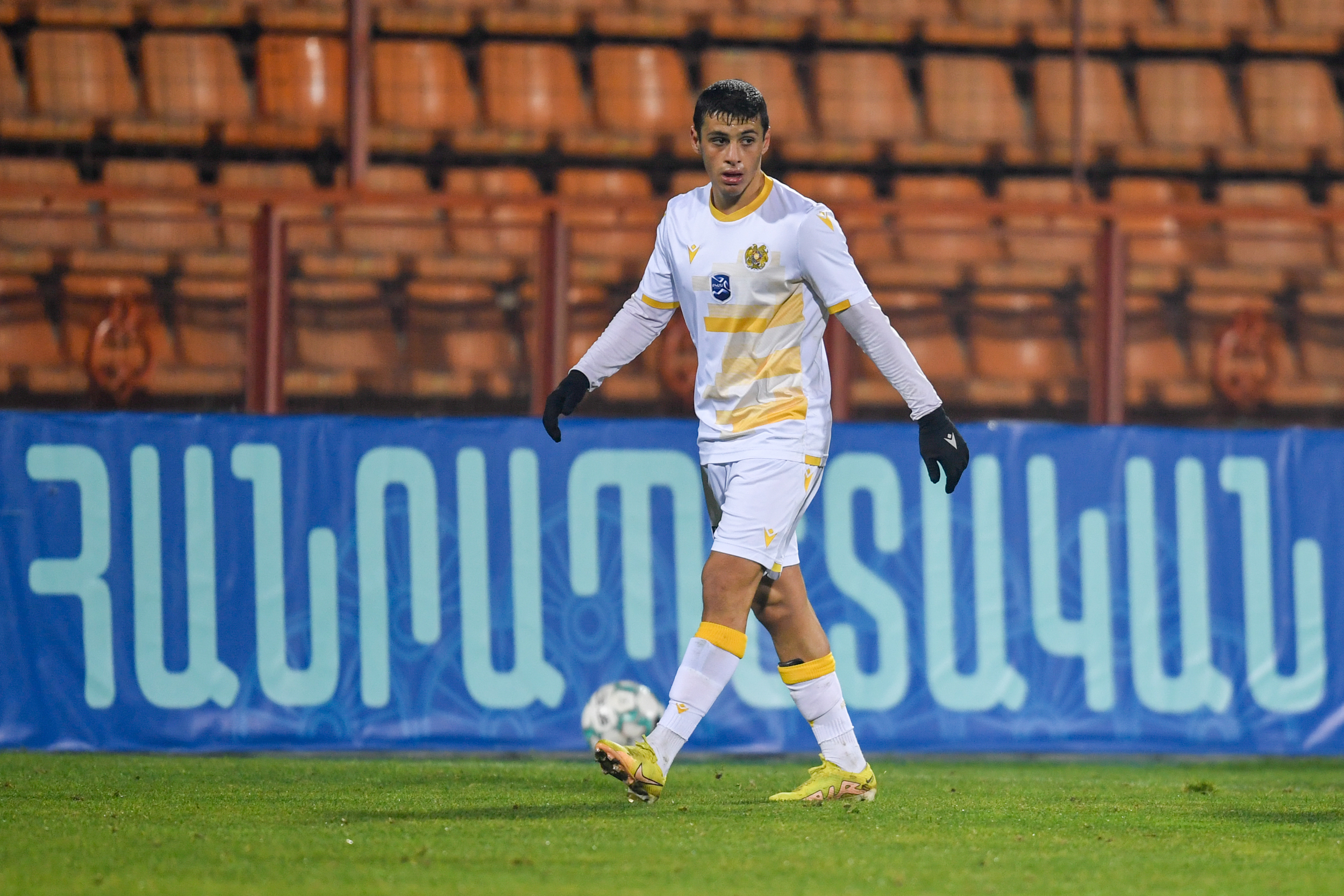
Serobyan with BKMA in 2025

In August 2021, his loan transfer to BKMA was announced.

On 1 September 2023, his loan transfer to Portugal's top league club Casa Pia was announced until the end of the 2023–24 season. On 10 January 2024, Casa Pia terminated Serobyan's loan and he returned to Ararat-Armenia.

On 14 January 2025, Serobyan signed for Sheriff Tiraspol on loan. On 16 August 2025, Sheriff announced that Serobyan had left the club after his loan deal had been ended by mutual agreement.

On 12 September 2026, Polish second division club Lechia Gdańsk announced they had reached an agreement with Ararat-Armenia to sign Serobyan on a deal until June 2030, effective from 1 February 2027.

== International career ==
Serobyan made his senior international debut for Armenia national team on 24 March 2022 in a friendly game against Montenegro, where he came in off the bench and played the last 20 minutes.

== Career statistics ==
=== Club ===
As of match played 5 November 2026

Appearances and goals by club, season and competition
Club	Season	League			National cup (Note: Includes Armenian Cup, Taça de Portugal, Moldovan Cup)		League cup (Note: Includes Taça da Liga)		Continental		Other		Total	
Club	Season	Division	Apps	Goals	Apps	Goals	Apps	Goals	Apps	Goals	Apps	Goals	Apps	Goals
Ararat-Armenia	2020–21	Armenian Premier League	13	0	3	0	—		0	0	0	0	16	0
Ararat-Armenia	2021–22	Armenian Premier League	0	0	0	0	—						0	0
Ararat-Armenia	2022–23	Armenian Premier League	15	5	0	0	—		0	0	—		15	5
Ararat-Armenia	2023–24	Armenian Premier League	17	6	3	2	—		4 (Note: Appearances in UEFA Europa Conference League)	0	—		24	8
Ararat-Armenia	2024–25	Armenian Premier League	15	2	0	0	—		4	3	—		19	5
Ararat-Armenia	2025–26	Armenian Premier League	22	7	4	0	—		—		1 (Note: Appearance in Armenian Supercup)	0	27	7
Ararat-Armenia	2026–27	Armenian Premier League	10	2	0	0	—		12 (Note: Six appearances and one goal in UEFA Champions League, six appearances in UEFA Europa League)	1	0	0	22	3
Ararat-Armenia	Total		92	22	10	2	—		20	4	1	0	123	28
BKMA Yerevan (loan)	2021–22	Armenian Premier League	25	2	1	1	—		—		—		26	3
BKMA Yerevan (loan)	2022–23	Armenian Premier League	18	2	1	0	—		—		—		19	2
BKMA Yerevan (loan)	Total		43	4	2	1	—		—		—		45	5
Casa Pia (loan)	2023–24	Primeira Liga	2	0	1	0	1	0	—		—		4	0
Sheriff Tiraspol (loan)	2024–25	Moldovan Super Liga	9	1	6	1	—		0	0	—		15	2
Sheriff Tiraspol (loan)	2025–26	Moldovan Super Liga	5	1	0	0	—		5 (Note: Four appearances and one goal in UEFA Europa League, one appearance in UEFA Conference League)	1	—		10	2
Sheriff Tiraspol (loan)	Total		14	2	6	1	—		5	1	—		25	4
Career total			151	28	19	4	1	0	25	5	1	0	197	37

=== International ===
As of match played 15 November 2026

Appearances and goals by national team and year
National team	Year	Apps	Goals
Armenia
Armenia	2022	5	0
Armenia	2023	8	0
Armenia	2024	5	0
Armenia	2025	7	0
Armenia	2026	8	2
Total		33	2

Scores and results list Armenia's goal tally first, score column indicates score after each Serobyan goal.

List of international goals scored by Artur Serobyan
No.	Date	Venue	Opponent	Score	Result	Competition
1	9 June 2026	Vazgen Sargsyan Republican Stadium, Yerevan, Armenia	Moldova	1–0	1–1	Friendly
2	28 September 2026	Vazgen Sargsyan Republican Stadium, Yerevan, Armenia	Montenegro	1–1	2–3	2026–27 UEFA Nations League C

== Honours ==
Ararat-Armenia

- Armenian Premier League: 2025–26
- Armenian Cup: 2023–24

Sheriff Tiraspol

- Cupa Moldovei: 2024–25

Individual

- Armenian Premier League Player of the Month: October 2025
