= FC Ararat-Armenia =

Armenian football club

Ararat-Armenia
- Full name: Football Club Ararat-Armenia
- Founded: 2017; 9 years ago
- Ground: Yerevan Football Academy Stadium
- Capacity: 1,428
- Owner: Samvel Karapetyan
- Director General: Poghos Galstyan
- Manager: Tulipa
- League: Armenian Premier League
- 2025–26: Armenian Premier League, 1st
- Website: fcararatarmenia.am
Home colours	Away colours

FC Ararat-Armenia (Armenian: Ֆուտբոլային Ակումբ Արարատ-Արմենիա, romanized: Futbolayin Akumb Ararat-Armenia, lit. 'Football Club Ararat–Armenia') is an Armenian professional football club based in Yerevan, founded in 2017.

== History ==
Former logo when the club was known as FC Avan Academy

It was founded in 2017 as FC Avan Academy by Ruben Hayrapetyan, on the basis of the young players of the Yerevan Football Academy graduates, as well as many young players from FC Pyunik.

They club's inaugural match took place in July 2017 against Erebuni SC. The friendly match ended up with a score of 3–1 in favour of Avan Academy.

In early 2018, the club was taken over by the Russian-Armenian businessman Samvel Karapetyan who renamed the football club as Ararat-Moskva, from Mount Ararat. The club was reorganized as soon as FC Ararat Moscow in Russia was denied certificate for the next season. Artak Oseyan managed the club during the 2017–18 Armenian First League season.

After being promoted to the Armenian Premier League, it was again renamed, this time to Ararat-Armenia, and will participate in the Premier League with this name.

On 2 August 2018, Vadim Skripchenko was appointed as the new head coach of Ararat-Armenia, before being sacked on 25 September 2018, and Ararat-Armenia-2 manager Artak Oseyan being appointed as caretaker manager.

On 1 October 2018, Vardan Minasyan was appointed as the new head coach of Ararat-Armenia.

On 30 May 2019, Ararat-Armenia defeated Banants 1–0 to win their first Armenian Premier League title. As a result of winning the 2018–19 Armenian Premier League, Ararat-Armenia qualified for the UEFA Champions League.

On 14 July 2020, Ararat-Armenia defended their Armenian Premier League title, securing their second league title, after defeating FC Noah 2–0. Three days later, 17 July 2020, Manager Vardan Minasyan left the club after his contract expired. On 22 July 2020, Ararat-Armenia announced David Campaña as their new manager. On 5 March 2021, David Campaña left his role as head coach by mutual consent, with Armen Adamyan being appointed as the caretaker head coach. On 24 March 2021, Ararat-Armenia announced Anatoly Baidachny as their new head coach. Baidachny would leave Ararat-Armenia two and a half months later, on 8 June 2021 by mutual consent, having won just three of his twelve games in charge. On 14 June 2021, Ararat-Armenia announced that Dmitri Gunko had been appointed as the clubs new head coach. Following the conclusion of the 2021–22, Dmitri Gunko left his role as head coach after his contract was not extended. On 10 June 2022, Vardan Bichakhchyan was announced as Ararat-Armenia's new head coach. On 8 June 2023, Bichakhchyan left his role as head coach after his contract expired.

On 17 June 2023, Ararat-Armenia announced the return of Vardan Minasyan as their head coach.

In July 2023, Ararat-Armenia announced a cooperation between themselves and FIFA licensed football agent Hrachya Ghambaryan, with whom they'll sign players through.

On 28 May 2025, Ararat-Armenia announced that head coach Vardan Minasyan and his coaching staff had left the club at the end of their contract.

On 3 June 2025, Ararat-Armenia announced the appointment of Tulipa as their new head coach.

=== League and cup ===
Season	League									Armenian Cup	Top goalscorer		Managers
Season	Div.	Pos.	Pl.	W	D	L	GS	GA	P	Armenian Cup	Name	League	Managers
2017–18	2nd	3rd	27	14	4	9	65	41	46	Quarterfinal	(Armenia) Armen Hovhannisyan	15	(Armenia) Artak Oseyan
2018–19	1st	1st	32	18	7	7	52	28	61	Semifinal	(Russia) Anton Kobyalko	15	(Belarus) Vadim Skripchenko (Armenia) Artak Oseyan (Caretaker) (Armenia) Vardan Minasyan
2019–20	1st	1st	28	15	7	6	45	23	52	Runners-up	(Cape Verde) Mailson Lima	8	(Armenia) Vardan Minasyan
2020–21	1st	5th	24	10	8	6	32	17	38	Semifinal	(Nigeria) Yusuf Otubanjo	10	(Spain) David Campaña (Armenia) Armen Adamyan (Caretaker) (Russia) Anatoly Baidachny
2021–22	1st	2nd	32	23	5	4	56	20	74	Quarterfinal	(Cape Verde) Mailson Lima	18	(Russia) Dmitri Gunko
2022–23	1st	3rd	36	23	7	6	70	27	76	Quarterfinal	(Ivory Coast) Wilfried Eza	13	(Armenia) Vardan Bichakhchyan
2023–24	1st	3rd	36	23	6	7	73	34	72	Winners	(Guinea) Mohamed Yattara	18	(Armenia) Vardan Minasyan
2024–25	1st	2nd	30	21	3	6	75	28	66	Runners-up	(Cameroon) Marius Noubissi	18	(Armenia) Vardan Minasyan
2025–26	1st	1st	27	18	6	3	50	25	60	Semi-final	(Armenia) Artur Serobyan (Armenia) Arayik Eloyan	7	(Portugal) Tulipa

The second team of the club Ararat-Armenia-2 has been playing in the first league (2nd division) since the 2018–19 season.

=== European ===
As of match played 5 November 2026

Competition	Pld	W	D	L	GF	GA	GD
UEFA Champions League	9	4	0	5	12	13	–1
UEFA Europa League	15	7	1	7	22	26	-4
UEFA Conference League	14	3	7	4	19	19	0
Total	38	14	8	16	53	58	-5

Season	Competition	Round	Club	Home	Away	Aggregate
2019–20	UEFA Champions League	1QR	(Sweden) AIK	2–1	1–3	3–4
2019–20	UEFA Europa League	2QR	(Gibraltar) Lincoln Red Imps	2–0	2–1	4–1
2019–20	UEFA Europa League	3QR	(Georgia (country)) Saburtalo Tbilisi	1–2	2–0	3–2
2019–20	UEFA Europa League	PO	(Luxembourg) F91 Dudelange	2–1	1–2 (a.e.t.)	3–3 (4–5 p)
2020–21	UEFA Champions League	1QR	(Cyprus) Omonia	0–1 (aet)	—N/a	—N/a
2020–21	UEFA Europa League	2QR	(Luxembourg) Fola Esch	4–3 (aet)	—N/a	—N/a
2020–21	UEFA Europa League	3QR	(Slovenia) Celje	1–0 (aet)	—N/a	—N/a
2020–21	UEFA Europa League	PO	(Serbia) Red Star Belgrade	1–2	—N/a	—N/a
2022–23	UEFA Europa Conference League	2QR	(Estonia) Paide Linnameeskond	0–0	0–0 (aet)	0–0 (3–5 p)
2023–24	UEFA Europa Conference League	1QR	(Albania) Egnatia	1–1	4–4	5–5 (4–2 p)
2023–24	UEFA Europa Conference League	2QR	(Greece) Aris Thessaloniki	1–1	0–1	1–2
2024–25	UEFA Conference League	2QR	(Moldova) Zimbru Chișinău	3–1	3–0	6–1
2024–25	UEFA Conference League	3QR	(Hungary) Puskás Akadémia	0–1	3–3	3–4
2025–26	UEFA Conference League	2QR	(Romania) Universitatea Cluj	0–0	2–1	2–1
2025–26	UEFA Conference League	3QR	(Czech Republic) Sparta Prague	1–2	1–4	1–6
2026–27	UEFA Champions League	1QR	(Latvia) Riga	2–0	2–3	4–3
2026–27	UEFA Champions League	2QR	(Republic of Ireland) Shamrock Rovers	2–0	1–2	3–2
2026–27	UEFA Champions League	3QR	(Slovenia) Celje	2–1	0–2	2–3
2026–27	UEFA Europa League	PO	(Romania) Universitatea Craiova	1–0	1–1	2–1
2026–27	UEFA Europa League	LP	(Czech Republic) Sparta Prague	1–4	—N/a	
2026–27	UEFA Europa League	LP	(Poland) Jagiellonia Białystok	—N/a	1–3	
2026–27	UEFA Europa League	LP	(Netherlands) AZ Alkmaar	0–4	—N/a	
2026–27	UEFA Europa League	LP	(Portugal) Torreense	—N/a	2–3	
2026–27	UEFA Europa League	LP	(Austria) Red Bull Salzburg	—N/a		
2026–27	UEFA Europa League	LP	(Netherlands) NEC Nijmegen		—N/a	
2026–27	UEFA Europa League	LP	(Slovenia) Celje		—N/a	
2026–27	UEFA Europa League	LP	(Italy) AC Milan	—N/a		

== Current squad ==
As of 12 September 2026

Note: Flags indicate national team as defined under FIFA eligibility rules; some limited exceptions apply. Players may hold more than one non-FIFA nationality.

No.	Pos.	Nation	Player
1	GK	ARM	Arman Nersesyan
2	DF	POR	Hugo Oliveira
3	DF	ARM	Junior Bueno
5	DF	BRA	Luis Felipe
6	MF	ARM	Michel Ayvazyan
7	FW	ARM	Zhirayr Shaghoyan
8	MF	COL	Juan Balanta
9	FW	ARM	Arayik Eloyan
10	MF	ARM	Armen Ambartsumyan (captain)
11	MF	GBS	Zidane Banjaqui
12	GK	ARM	Hayk Khachatryan
13	DF	ARM	Kamo Hovhannisyan
14	DF	POR	Bruno Pereira
16	DF	ARM	Edgar Grigoryan
17	MF	FRA	Maxence Carlier

No.	Pos.	Nation	Player
19	MF	ARM	Karen Muradyan
20	MF	KEN	Alwyn Tera
23	MF	ARM	Martun Hovhannisyan
25	FW	SEN	Alioune Ndour
36	MF	ARM	Vahram Makhsudyan
43	DF	MOZ	Bruno Wilson
47	DF	GRE	Alexandros Malis
70	MF	POR	Benny
77	FW	ARM	Artur Serobyan
90	FW	GHA	Paul Ayongo
91	FW	BRA	Sandro Lima
95	MF	BRA	França
98	GK	BRA	João Bravim
—	GK	ARM	Shirak Badalyan

=== Ararat-Armenia-2 ===
Ararat Yerevan-2
- Founded: 2018; 8 years ago
- Ground: Yerevan Football Academy Stadium, Yerevan
- Owner: Samvel Karapetyan
- President: Poghos Galstyan
- Manager: Tigran Petrosyants
- League: Armenian First League
- 2021–22: 5th
Home colours	Away colours

Ararat-Armenia's reserve squad play as Ararat-Armenia-2 in the Armenian First League. They currently play their home games at the Yerevan Football Academy Stadium in the Avan District of northern Yerevan.

== Honours ==
=== Domestic ===
- Armenian Premier League
  - Champions: 2018–19, 2019–20, 2025–26
- Armenian Cup
  - Winners: 2023–24
  - Runners-up: 2019–20, 2024–25
- Armenian Supercup
  - Winners: 2019, 2024
  - Runners-up: 2020, 2025

== Managerial history ==
As of match played 5 November 2026. Only competitive matches are counted.

Name	Nat.	From	To	P	W	D	L	GS	GA	%W	Honours	Notes
Artak Oseyan	Armenia	1 July 2017	30 June 2018	29	14	4	11	65	48	48.28		
Andranik Babayan	Armenia	1 July 2018	30 July 2018	0	0	0	0	0	0	—		
Vadim Skripchenko	Belarus	2 August 2018	25 September 2018	9	4	2	3	16	12	44.44		
Artak Oseyan Caretaker	Armenia	25 September 2018	1 October 2018	1	0	1	0	0	0	0.00		
Vardan Minasyan	Armenia	1 October 2018	17 July 2020	68	40	15	13	130	56	58.82	Armenian Premier League (2); Armenian Supercup (1)	
David Campaña	Spain	22 July 2020	5 March 2021	17	7	4	6	23	16	41.18		
Armen Adamyan Caretaker	Armenia	5 March 2021	24 March 2021	3	2	1	0	5	1	66.67		
Anatoly Baidachny	Russia	24 March 2021	8 June 2021	12	3	4	5	10	13	25.00		
Dmitri Gunko	Russia	14 June 2021	2 June 2022	34	24	5	5	59	23	70.59		
Vardan Bichakhchyan	Armenia	10 June 2022	8 June 2023	40	24	9	7	74	31	60.00		
Vardan Minasyan	Armenia	17 June 2023	28 May 2025	83	52	14	17	175	83	62.65	Armenian Supercup (1)	
Tulipa	Portugal	3 June 2025		61	35	12	14	101	68	57.38	Armenian Premier League (1)	

== Player records ==
Competitive, professional matches only, appearances including substitutes appear in brackets.

Armen Ambartsumyan is Ararat-Armenia's most capped player, with 251 appearances for the club, whilst Tenton Yenne is the clubs leading goalscorer with 47 goals in 114 appearances.
Players in bold signifies current Ararat-Armenia player.

=== Most appearances ===
As of match played 5 November 2026

	Name	Years	League	Armenian Cup	Supercup	Europe	Total
1	(Armenia) **Armen Ambartsumyan**	2018–Present	200 (17)	31 (0)	4 (0)	24 (0)	**259** (17)
2	(Armenia) **Karen Muradyan**	2021–Present	152 (1)	17 (0)	2 (0)	25 (1)	**196** (2)
3	(Kenya) **Alwyn Tera**	2021–Present	147 (8)	12 (1)	2 (0)	21 (0)	**182** (9)
4	(Armenia) **Junior Bueno**	2021–Present	131 (4)	18 (0)	2 (0)	23 (1)	**173** (5)
5	(Armenia) **Zhirayr Shaghoyan**	2017–Present	122 (25)	18 (1)	2 (0)	14 (1)	**156** (27)
6	(Armenia) **Edgar Grigoryan**	2023–Present	91 (0)	12 (0)	2 (0)	23 (0)	**127** (0)
7	(Cape Verde) Mailson Lima	2019–2021, 2021–2023	102 (33)	9 (1)	2 (2)	12 (5)	**125** (41)
8	(Armenia) **Artur Serobyan**	2020–Present	92 (22)	10 (2)	1 (0)	20 (4)	**123** (28)
9	(Armenia) Artyom Avanesyan	2018–2024	101 (7)	12 (6)	0 (0)	6 (0)	**119** (13)
9	(Brazil) Alemão	2020–2024	97 (8)	11 (1)	0 (0)	10 (1)	**119** (10)

=== Top goalscorers ===
As of match played 5 November 2026

	Name	Years	League	Armenian Cup	Supercup	Europe	Total	Ratio
1	(Nigeria) Tenton Yenne	2022–2025	43 (94)	1 (9)	1 (1)	2 (10)	**47** (114)	0.41
2	(Cape Verde) Mailson Lima	2019–2021, 2021–2023	33 (102)	1 (9)	2 (2)	5 (12)	**41** (125)	0.33
3	(Russia) Anton Kobyalko	2018–2020	19 (48)	7 (10)	0 (1)	4 (7)	**30** (66)	0.45
4	(Nigeria) Yusuf Otubanjo	2020–2022	26 (58)	3 (9)	0 (1)	0 (4)	**29** (72)	0.4
5	(Armenia) **Artur Serobyan**	2020–Present	22 (92)	2 (10)	0 (1)	4 (20)	**28** (123)	0.23
6	(Ivory Coast) Wilfried Eza	2021–2023	22 (68)	3 (4)	0 (0)	2 (5)	**27** (77)	0.35
6	(Armenia) **Zhirayr Shaghoyan**	2017–Present	25 (122)	1 (18)	0 (2)	1 (14)	**27** (156)	0.17
8	(Cameroon) Marius Noubissi	2024–2025	18 (26)	2 (5)	2 (1)	0 (0)	**22** (32)	0.69
9	(Nigeria) Ogana Louis	2019–2021	9 (39)	8 (5)	0 (2)	2 (9)	**19** (55)	0.35
10	(Guinea) Mohamed Yattara	2023–2024	18 (28)	0 (2)	0 (0)	0 (0)	**18** (30)	0.6

=== Clean Sheets ===
As of match played 5 November 2026

	Name	Years	League	Armenian Cup	Supercup	Europe	Total	Ratio
1	(Russia) Dmitry Abakumov	2018–2023	34 (68)	5 (12)	0 (0)	1 (5)	**40** (85)	0.47
2	(Russia) Vsevolod Ermakov	2022–2024	19 (43)	1 (1)	(-)	2 (6)	**21** (50)	0.42
3	(Italy) Valerio Vimercati	2021–2022	15 (30)	0 (0)	(-)	(-)	**15** (30)	0.5
4	(Armenia) Arsen Beglaryan	2023–2025	9 (28)	2 (3)	(-)	1 (2)	**12** (33)	0.36
5	(Portugal) Bruno Pinto	2025–2026	8 (19)	0 (0)	0 (1)	1 (4)	**9** (24)	0.38
6	(Serbia) Stefan Čupić	2019–2021	5 (14)	1 (4)	0 (2)	2 (7)	**8** (27)	0.3
6	(Armenia) **Arman Nersesyan**	2019–Present	5 (15)	3 (5)	0 (0)	0 (1)	**8** (21)	0.38
8	(Armenia) Nikos Melikyan	2017–2019	7 (23)	0 (0)	(-)	(-)	**7** (25)	0.28
8	(Ukraine) Danylo Kucher	2024–2025	7 (13)	0 (0)	(-)	0 (2)	**7** (15)	0.47
8	(Armenia) Henri Avagyan	2025	4 (10)	2 (5)	1 (1)	(-)	**7** (16)	0.44
11	(Brazil) **João Bravim**	2026–Present	3 (5)	0 (0)	(-)	3 (12)	**6** (17)	0.35
12	(North Macedonia) Damjan Shishkovski	2024	3 (8)	0 (1)	(-)	(-)	**3** (9)	0.33
13	(Russia) Arsen Siukayev	2018–2019	0 (2)	1 (2)	(-)	(-)	**1** (4)	0.25
14	(Serbia) Nikola Petrić	2021	0 (4)	0 (0)	(-)	(-)	**0** (4)	0

== See also ==
- Football in Armenia
- Football Federation of Armenia
