= Arayik Eloyan =

Armenian footballer (born 2004)

Personal information
- Date of birth: 16 March 2004 (age 22)
- Place of birth: Yerevan, Armenia
- Height: 1.88 m (6 ft 2 in)
- Position: Forward

Team information
- Current team: Ararat-Armenia
- Number: 9

Youth career
- –2021: Urartu

Senior career*
Years	Team	Apps	(Gls)
2021–2022	Urartu-2	18	(5)
2022–	Ararat-Armenia	14	(4)
2022–2023	→ BKMA Yerevan-2 (loan)	18	(13)
2023–2025	→ BKMA Yerevan (loan)	53	(14)

International career^{‡}
2021	Armenia U18	1	(0)
2022	Armenia U19	9	(2)
2024–	Armenia U21	9	(0)
2025–	Armenia	4	(0)
- * Club domestic league appearances and goals as of 10 December 2025 ‡ National team caps and goals as of 5 October 2026

Arayik Eloyan (Armenian: Արայիկ Էլոյան, born 16 March 2004) is an Armenian professional footballer who plays as a forward for Armenian Premier League club Ararat-Armenia, and the Armenia national team.

== Club career ==
Arayik Eloyan is a graduate of the Urartu Football Academy.

In June 2025, Ararat-Armenia returned Eloyan to the team from his loan to BKMA.

== International career ==
Eloyan played for the Armenian youth teams of various ages.

In March 2025, he received his first call-up to the Armenia national team for a 2024–25 UEFA Nations League playoff matches against Georgia.

Eloyan made his senior international debut for Armenia national team on 9 June 2025 in a friendly game against Montenegro, where he came in off the bench and played the last 30 minutes.

== Career statistics ==
=== International ===
As of 5 October 2026

Armenia
Year	Apps	Goals
2025	3	0
2026	1	0
Total	4	0

== Honours ==
=== Player ===
Ararat-Armenia

- Armenian Premier League: 2025–26
