= Danylo Kucher =

Ukrainian footballer

Personal information
- Full name: Danylo Olehovych Kucher
- Date of birth: 25 January 1997 (age 29)
- Place of birth: Kryvyi Rih, Ukraine
- Height: 1.93 m (6 ft 4 in)
- Position: Goalkeeper

Team information
- Current team: Altai
- Number: 25

Youth career
- 2008–2014: Kryvbas Kryvyi Rih
- 2014–2016: Dnipro Dnipropetrovsk

Senior career*
Years	Team	Apps	(Gls)
2016–2018	Dnipro Dnipropetrovsk	1	(0)
2018	Hirnyk Kryvyi Rih	16	(0)
2019	Daugavpils	31	(0)
2020–2021	RFS	19	(0)
2021	Mynai	16	(0)
2022–2023	Inhulets Petrove	6	(0)
2023–2024	UTA Arad	16	(0)
2024–2025	Ararat-Armenia	13	(0)
2025–2026	Concordia Chiajna	24	(0)
2026–	Altai	11	(0)

International career
2016	Ukraine U19	2	(0)
2016	Ukraine U20	1	(0)
- * Club domestic league appearances and goals as of 11 October 2026

Danylo Olehovych Kucher (Ukrainian: Данило Олегович Кучер; born 25 January 1997) is a Ukrainian professional footballer who plays as a goalkeeper for Kazakhstan Premier League club Altai.

== Career ==
=== Early years ===
Kucher is a product of Kryvbas Kryvyi Rih academy. His first coach was Oleksandr Hranovskyi.

=== Dnipro ===
In 2014 he signed a contract with Dnipro Dnipropetrovsk and played for the reserve squad. Kucher made his debut for the senior squad against Olimpik Donetsk on 15 May 2016 in the Ukrainian Premier League.

=== UTA Arad ===
In February 2023 he moved to UTA Arad.

=== Ararat-Armenia ===
On 18 July 2025, Armenian Premier League club Ararat-Armenia announced the signing of Kucher. On 2 June 2025, Ararat-Armenia announced the departure of Kucher.

== Career statistics ==
As of match played on 11 October 2026

Club statistics
Club	Season	League			National cup (Note: Includes Ukrainian Cup, Latvian Cup, Cupa României, Kazakhstan Cup)		Other		Total	
Club	Season	Division	Apps	Goals	Apps	Goals	Apps	Goals	Apps	Goals
Dnipro	2015–16	Ukrainian Premier League	1	0	1	0	—		2	0
Dnipro	2016–17	Ukrainian Premier League	0	0	0	0	—		0	0
Dnipro	Total		1	0	1	0	—		2	0
Hirnyk Kryvyi Rih	2018–19	Ukrainian First League	16	0	3	0	—		19	0
Daugavpils	2019	Latvian Higher League	31	0	1	0	—		32	0
RFS	2020	Latvian Higher League	19	0	2	0	1 (Note: Appearance in the UEFA Europa League)	0	22	0
Mynai	2021–22	Ukrainian Premier League	16	0	0	0	—		16	0
Inhulets Petrove	2022–23	Ukrainian Premier League	6	0	0	0	—		6	0
UTA Arad	2022–23	Liga I	8	0	1	0	0	0	9	0
UTA Arad	2023–24	Liga I	8	0	4	0	—		12	0
UTA Arad	Total		16	0	5	0	0	0	21	0
Ararat-Armenia	2024–25	Armenian Premier League	13	0	0	0	2 (Note: Appearance in the UEFA Conference League)	0	15	0
Concordia Chiajna	2025–26	Liga II	24	0	4	0	—		28	0
Altai	2026	Kazakhstan Premier League	11	0	2	0	—		13	0
Career totals			153	0	18	0	3	0	174	0

== Honours ==
Ararat-Armenia

- Armenian Cup runner-up: 2024–25
- Armenian Supercup: 2024
