= C.S. Marítimo Under-23s =

Portuguese football club

Marítimo Under-23
- Full name: Club Sport Marítimo Under-23
- Nicknames: Os Verde-Rubros (The Green-and-Reds); Os Leões (The Lions)
- Founded: 2018
- Dissolved: 2023
- Ground: Estádio Municipal de Machico, Machico, Madeira
- Capacity: 3,300
- Chairman: Rui Fontes
- Manager: Marco Bragança
- League: Liga Revelação
- 2022–23: 7th
- Website: http://www.csmaritimo.org.pt/
Home colours	Away colours	Third colours

Club Sport Marítimo Under-23 is a Portuguese football club that plays in the Liga Revelação. They are a reserve team of Club Sport Marítimo, however following the senior team's relegation from the Primeira Liga to the Liga Portugal 2 in 2023, the Under-23 team was dissolved for financial reasons. After a 2-year hiatus, the Under-23 team was reformed ahead of the 2025-26 Liga Revelação season.
