= 2025–26 Armenian Premier League =

Armenian Premier League
- Season: 2025–26
- Dates: 1 August 2025 – 27 May 2026
- Champions: Ararat-Armenia (3rd title)
- Champions League: Ararat-Armenia
- Conference League: Noah; Pyunik; Alashkert
- Matches: 74
- Goals: 188 (2.54 per match)
- Top goalscorer: Bruno Michel (18)
- All statistics correct as of 26 May 2026.

The 2025–26 Armenian Premier League, known as the Armenian Fastex Premier League (Armenian: Հայաստանի Պրեմիեր Լիգա) for sponsorship reasons, is the 34th season of the league since its establishment.

== Season events ==
On 15 July, the Football Federation of Armenia announced that 10 teams would take part in this seasons Armenian Premier League, with Gandzasar Kapan being saved from relegation after West Armenia were disqualified from the league the previous season, and no teams being promoted to the league.

On 8 June 2026, the Football Federation of Armenia voted to expanded the league from 10 teams to 12 teams, meaning Shirak were spared relegation.

== Teams ==
Locations of the teams

Club	Location	Stadium	Capacity
Alashkert	Abovyan	Abovyan City Stadium	3,100
Ararat Yerevan	Yerevan (Kentron)	Vazgen Sargsyan Republican Stadium	14,403
Ararat-Armenia	Yerevan (Avan)	Yerevan Football Academy Stadium^{1}	1,428
BKMA	Yerevan (Avan)	Yerevan Football Academy Stadium^{1}	1,428
Gandzasar Kapan	Yerevan (Shengavit)	Junior Sport Stadium^{1}	1,000
Noah	Abovyan	Abovyan City Stadium^{1}	3,100
Pyunik	Yerevan (Shengavit)	Junior Sport Stadium	1,000
Shirak	Gyumri	Gyumri City Stadium	4,000
Urartu	Yerevan (Malatia-Sebastia)	Urartu Stadium	4,860
Van	Charentsavan	Charentsavan City Stadium	5,000

=== Personnel and sponsorship ===
Team	Manager	Captain	Kit manufacturer	Shirt sponsor
Alashkert	(Armenia) Vahe Gevorgyan	(Armenia) Karen Nalbandyan	(Russia) Jogël	Fastex, Unibank
Ararat Yerevan	(Portugal) Ricardo Dionísio	(Armenia) Artur Grigoryan	(Armenia) Melante	Yo Health
Ararat-Armenia	(Portugal) Tulipa	(Armenia) Armen Ambartsumyan	(Italy) Macron	Tashir Group
BKMA	(Armenia) Armen Gyulbudaghyants	(Armenia) Argishti Petrosyan	(Italy) Macron	–
Gandzasar Kapan	(Armenia) Karen Barseghyan	(Armenia) Vaspurak Minasyan	(Spain) Kelme	–
Noah	(Croatia) Sandro Perković	(Armenia) Hovhannes Hambardzumyan	(Germany) Adidas	Takar, imaginelive or Go.Sport FM 96.3
Pyunik	(Armenia) Artak Oseyan	(Armenia) Edgar Malakyan	(Spain) Joma	Fastex, Landmark Capital
Shirak	(Armenia) Arsen Hovhannisyan	(Armenia) Rafik Misakyan	(Germany) Adidas	Yo Health
Urartu	(Armenia) Robert Arzumanyan	(Armenia) Zhirayr Margaryan	(Armenia) Melante	AraratBank
Van	(Armenia) Arthur Asoyan	(Armenia) Hrayr Mkoyan	(Russia) Jogël	Yo Health, Rare Water, Click Market

=== Managerial changes ===
Team	Outgoing manager	Manner of departure	Date of vacancy	Position in table	Incoming manager	Date of appointment
Ararat-Armenia	(Armenia) Vardan Minasyan	End of contract	31 May 2025	Pre-season	(Portugal) Tulipa	2 June 2025
Noah	(Portugal) Rui Mota	Signed by Ludogorets Razgrad	14 June 2025	Pre-season	(Croatia) Sandro Perković	14 June 2025
Urartu	(Russia) Dmitri Gunko	Signed by Arsenal Tula	18 June 2025	Pre-season	(Armenia) Robert Arzumanyan	19 June 2025
Shirak	(Armenia) Rafael Nazaryan	End of contract	20 June 2025	Pre-season	(Armenia) Arsen Hovhannisyan	24 June 2025
Ararat Yerevan	(Armenia) Tigran Yesayan	End of contract	4 July 2025	Pre-season	(Armenia) Albert Safaryan	7 July 2025
Van	(Armenia) Vahe Gevorgyan	End of contract	27 July 2025	Pre-season	(Armenia) Edgar Torosyan	27 July 2025
Pyunik	(Armenia) Yegishe Melikyan	Signed by Armenia	6 August 2025	2nd	(Armenia) Artak Oseyan	12 August 2025
Van	(Armenia) Edgar Torosyan	Mutual Termination	27 October 2025	7th	(Armenia) Arthur Asoyan	27 October 2025
Ararat Yerevan	(Armenia) Albert Safaryan	Sacked	17 January 2026	10th	(Portugal) Ricardo Dionísio	18 January 2026

== League table ==
Pos	Team	Pld	W	D	L	GF	GA	GD	Pts	Qualification or relegation
1	Ararat-Armenia (C)	27	18	6	3	50	25	+25	60	Qualification for the Champions League first qualifying round
2	Noah	27	16	8	3	61	19	+42	56	Qualification for the Conference League second qualifying round (Note: The 2025–26 Armenian Cup winners (Noah) qualify for the Conference League second qualifying round.)
3	Pyunik	27	17	4	6	37	18	+19	55	Qualification for the Conference League first qualifying round
4	Alashkert	27	16	5	6	42	23	+19	53	Qualification for the Conference League first qualifying round
5	Urartu	27	14	7	6	43	26	+17	49	
6	Van	27	9	4	14	27	40	−13	31	
7	BKMA	27	4	11	12	30	42	−12	23	
8	Gandzasar Kapan	27	5	6	16	20	41	−21	21	
9	Ararat Yerevan	27	3	4	20	21	63	−42	13 (Note: Matches won: Ararat 3, Shirak 2)	
10	Shirak	27	2	7	18	17	51	−34	13	

Source: FFA
Rules for classification: 1) Points; 2) Head-to-head points; 3) Head-to-head goal difference; 4) Head-to-head goals scored; 5) Matches won; 6) Goal difference; 7) Less red cards; 8) Less yellow cards; 9) Fair-play ranking 10) Draw
(C) Champions

== Fixtures and results ==
=== Results table ===
Home \ Away	ALA	ARA	AAR	BKM	GAK	NOA	PYU	SHI	URA	VAN
Alashkert		3–0	1–0	2–0	2–0	2–0	1–2	1–1	0–2	1–0
Alashkert		2–0			3–1	1–1	0–1	2–0		
Ararat Yerevan	2–3		1–2	2–2	0–2	0–3	0–2	0–0	0–1	0–1
Ararat Yerevan				1–1			1–0		0–1	1–2
Ararat-Armenia	2–1	4–2		2–1	1–0	2–2	1–0	4–1	1–1	3–0
Ararat-Armenia	1–1	4–0			1–0	0–4				
BKMA	1–3	4–0	2–2		0–0	0–2	1–2	2–1	1–1	0–0
BKMA	2–2		2–3		1–1			0–0	0–1	
Gandzasar	1–0	1–1	0–1	0–0		1–4	0–1	1–1	2–2	1–0
Gandzasar		2–1				0–3	0–2	3–2		0–1
Noah	2–2	2–0	1–2	2–3	4–1		3–1	4–0	0–0	2–1
Noah		8–3		2–0			0–0	3–0		2–0
Pyunik	1–0	2–0	1–0	2–1	2–0	0–0		3–0	1–2	5–1
Pyunik			0–2	2–0					2–1	2–1
Shirak	1–2	4–2	0–1	1–1	1–0	0–2	0–0		0–1	2–3
Shirak		0–2	0–4				0–1		0–0	
Urartu	0–1	6–0	2–3	4–1	1–0	0–0	1–1	5–0		2–0
Urartu	1–3		0–2		4–2	0–5				
Van	1–2	1–2	0–0	3–2	2–1	0–0	2–1	3–2	0–2	
Van	0–1		2–2	1–2				1–0	1–2	

Source: Soccerway
Legend: Blue = home team win; Yellow = draw; Red = away team win.

== Season statistics ==
=== Top scorers ===
As of match played 26 May 2026

Rank	Player	Club	Goals
1	(Brazilian Football Confederation) Bruno Michel	Urartu	18
2	(Football Federation of Armenia) Karen Nalbandyan	Alashkert	14
3	(Guinean Football Federation) Momo Touré	Alashkert	11
4	(Portuguese Football Federation) Hélder Ferreira	Noah	10
4	(Brazilian Football Confederation) Matheus Aiás	Noah	10
4	(Football Association of Bosnia and Herzegovina) Nardin Mulahusejnović	Noah	10
7	(Malian Football Federation) Mamadou Doumbia	Ararat Yerevan	9
8	(Football Federation of Armenia) Narek Hovhannisyan	BKMA Yerevan	8
9	(Football Federation of Armenia) Artur Serobyan	Ararat-Armenia	7
9	(Cameroonian Football Federation) Marius Noubissi	Pyunik	7
9	(Football Federation of Armenia) Arayik Eloyan	Ararat-Armenia	7
9	(Football Federation of Armenia) Rafik Misakyan	Shirak	7

=== Clean sheets ===
As of match played 3 May 2026

Rank	Player	Club	Clean sheets
1	(Football Federation of Armenia) Henri Avagyan	Pyunik	10
2	(Russian Football Union) Aleksandr Mishiyev	Urartu	8
2	(Football Federation of Armenia) Arsen Beglaryan	Alashkert	8
4	(Brazilian Football Confederation) Arthur Coneglian	Noah	6
5	(Portuguese Football Federation) Bruno Pinto	Ararat-Armenia	5
6	(Russian Football Union) Nikita Lobusov	Gandzasar Kapan	4
7	(Football Federation of Armenia) Lyova Karapetyan	Shirak	3
7	(Football Federation of Armenia) Davit Davtyan	BKMA Yerevan	3
7	(Football Federation of Armenia) Arman Nersesyan	Ararat-Armenia	3
7	(Comoros Football Federation) Adel Anzimati-Aboudou	Ararat Yerevan	3
7	(Football Federation of Armenia) Ognjen Čančarević	Noah	3

Davit Davtyan & Hayk Ghazaryan both played in BKMA Yerevan's 0-0 draw with Van on 29 August 2025

== Awards ==
=== Monthly awards ===
Month	Manager of the Month		Player of the Month		References
Month	Manager	Club	Player	Club	References
August	(Armenia) Vahe Gevorgyan	Alashkert	(Nigeria) Olawale Farayola	Alashkert	
September	(Croatia) Sandro Perković	Noah	(Armenia) Narek Hovhannisyan	BKMA Yerevan	
October	(Portugal) Tulipa	Ararat-Armenia	(Armenia) Artur Serobyan	Ararat-Armenia	
November	(Armenia) Artak Oseyan	Pyunik	(Brazil) Bruno Michel	Urartu	
March	(Armenia) Artak Oseyan	Pyunik	(Guinea) Momo Yansané	Pyunik	
April	(Armenia) Vahe Gevorgyan	Alashkert	(Armenia) Karen Nalbandyan	Alashkert	
May	(Croatia) Sandro Perković	Noah	(Portugal) Hélder Ferreira	Noah	

=== Annual awards ===
Award	Winner	Club	Ref.
Manager of the Season	(Portugal) Tulipa	Ararat-Armenia	
Player of the Season	(Armenia) Artur Serobyan	Ararat-Armenia	
