= 2023–24 FC Urartu season =

Urartu
2023–24 season
- CEO: Artur Sahakyan
- Manager: Dmitri Gunko
- Stadium: Urartu Stadium
- Premier League: 4th
- Armenian Cup: Runners Up
- UEFA Champions League: First qualifying round
- UEFA Europa Conference League: Second qualifying round
- Top goalscorer: League: Temur Dzhikiya (11); All: Temur Dzhikiya (11)
Home colours	Away colours

The 2023–24 season was FC Urartu's twenty-third consecutive season in the Armenian Premier League.

== Season overview ==
On 23 June, Urartu announced the signing of Mikayel Mirzoyan from BKMA Yerevan.

On 28 June, Urartu announced the signing of Dmitry Abakumov on a free transfer after his contract with Ararat-Armenia expired.

On 2 July, Urartu announced the signing of Artyom Maksimenko from Ural Yekaterinburg.

On 8 July, Urartu announced the signing of free agent Pavel Mogilevets. The following day, Urartu announced the signing of Eduardo Teixeira from Braga, with Periša Pešukić signing from Novi Pazar on 190 July.

On 16 July, Ugochukwu Iwu left the club by mutual consent to join Rubin Kazan.

On 25 July, Urartu announced the signing of Uroš Stojanović from Radnik Surdulica.

On 26 August, Urartu announced the signing of Nikolai Prudnikov from Mezőkövesd.

On 29 August, Urartu announced that Narek Grigoryan had left the club to sign for Farul Constanța.

On 5 September, Urartu announced the signing of Gevorg Tarakhchyan from BKMA Yerevan.

On 22 November, Aras Özbiliz announced his retirement from football.

On 15 December, Marcos Júnior left Urartu by mutual consent.

On 20 December, Eduardo Teixeira left Urartu by mutual consent.

On 29 December, both Ivan Zotko and Artyom Maksimenko left Urartu after their contracts where terminated by mutual agreement.

On 12 January, Nana Antwi left Urartu to join Romanian Liga I club FCSB.

On 16 January, Urartu announced the signing of Vladislav Panteleyev from Arsenal Tula.

On 18 January, Urartu announced the signing of Álvaro Veliez from Deportivo Maipú.

On 19 January, Urartu announced the signing of free-agent Aleksandr Putsko who'd last played for Baltika Kaliningrad, and the departure of Garnik Minasyan and Levon Bashoyan on loan to BKMA Yerevan.

On 25 January, Urartu announced the signing of Andriy Kravchuk who'd most recently played for Cork City.

On 26 January, Urartu announced that Yaya Sanogo had left the club by mutual agreement.

On 30 January, Urartu announced the signing of Luqman Gilmore from Liepāja.

On 25 February, Urartu announced the signing of free agent Aleksandr Dolgov, with fellow Russian free-agent Denis Glushakov also signing the following day.

== Squad ==
As of match played 24 May 2024

Number	Name	Nationality	Position	Date of birth (age)	Signed from	Signed in	Contract ends	Apps.	Goals
Goalkeepers
31	Dmitry Abakumov	(Russia)	GK	8 July 1989 (aged 34)	Unattached	2023		8	0
42	Aleksandr Melikhov	(Russia)	GK	23 March 1998 (aged 26)	Akhmat Grozny	2022		58	0
92	Aleksandr Mishiyev	(Russia)	GK	29 January 2004 (aged 20)	Mashuk-KMV Pyatigorsk	2023		2	0
Defenders
3	Erik Piloyan	(Armenia)	DF	29 January 2001 (aged 23)	Academy	2019		51	2
4	Yevhen Tsymbalyuk	(Ukraine)	DF	19 June 1996 (aged 27)	Desna Chernihiv	2022		53	4
6	Arman Ghazaryan	(Armenia)	DF	24 July 2001 (aged 22)	Academy	2019		66	3
15	Aleksandr Putsko	(Russia)	DF	24 February 1993 (aged 31)	Unattached	2024		0	0
20	Periša Pešukić	(Montenegro)	DF	7 December 1997 (aged 26)	Novi Pazar	2023		20	1
24	Uroš Stojanović	(Serbia)	DF	23 August 1995 (aged 28)	Radnik Surdulica	2023		22	0
33	Alik Mkrtchyan	(Armenia)	DF	31 August 2004 (aged 19)	Academy	2023		1	0
55	Erik Simonyan	(Armenia)	DF	12 June 2003 (aged 20)	Academy	2019		14	1
88	Zhirayr Margaryan	(Armenia)	DF	13 September 1997 (aged 26)	Veres Rivne	2022		97	4
99	Khariton Ayvazyan	(Armenia)	DF	8 November 2003 (aged 20)	Academy	2020		41	0
Midfielders
5	Dramane Salou	(Burkina Faso)	MF	22 May 1998 (aged 26)	Unattached	2023		50	3
8	Denis Glushakov	(Russia)	MF	27 January 1987 (aged 37)	Unattached	2024		12	0
9	Narek Agasaryan	(Armenia)	MF	15 July 2001 (aged 22)	Academy	2021		98	3
12	Luqman Gilmore	(Nigeria)	MF	10 May 1996 (aged 28)	Liepāja	2024		10	0
13	Vladislav Panteleyev	(Russia)	MF	15 August 1996 (aged 27)	Arsenal Tula	2024		6	0
21	Andriy Kravchuk	(Ukraine)	MF	26 February 1999 (aged 25)	Unattached	2024		16	3
22	Mikayel Mirzoyan	(Armenia)	MF	6 February 2001 (aged 23)	BKMA Yerevan	2023		30	4
51	David Ghiasyan	(Armenia)	MF	21 April 2006 (aged 18)	Academy	2023		1	0
53	Davit Harutyunyan	(Armenia)	MF	2 August 2007 (aged 16)	Academy	2024		3	0
77	Temur Dzhikiya	(Russia)	MF	8 May 1998 (aged 26)	on loan from Volga Ulyanovsk	2023	2024	44	15
90	Oleg Polyakov	(Russia)	MF	29 November 1990 (aged 33)	Armavir	2020		121	9
	Sergey Mkrtchyan	(Armenia)	MF	26 June 2001 (aged 22)	Academy	2021		51	3
Forwards
10	Karen Melkonyan	(Armenia)	FW	25 March 1999 (aged 25)	Academy	2017		159	16
11	Gevorg Tarakhchyan	(Armenia)	FW	15 March 2002 (aged 22)	BKMA Yerevan	2023		51	2
17	Aleksandr Dolgov	(Russia)	FW	24 September 1998 (aged 25)	Unattached	2024		7	1
18	Leon Sabua	(Russia)	FW	1 September 2000 (aged 23)	Krasnodar	2022		43	10
19	Nikolai Prudnikov	(Russia)	FW	1 January 1998 (aged 26)	Mezőkövesd	2023		27	4
30	Álvaro Veliez	(Argentina)	FW	6 May 1995 (aged 29)	Deportivo Maipú	2024		8	0
Urartu II
	Mkhitar Umreyan	(Armenia)	GK	23 September 2004 (aged 19)	Academy	2022		0	0
	David Ghiasyan	(Armenia)	MF	21 April 2006 (aged 18)	Academy	2022		1	0
	Artur Israelyan	(Armenia)	MF	16 January 2004 (aged 20)	Academy	2022		1	0
Players away on loan
16	Barry Isaac	(Nigeria)	DF	21 August 2001 (aged 22)	Right2Win SA	2022		7	0
29	Garnik Minasyan	(Armenia)	MF	12 July 2005 (aged 18)	Academy	2023		1	0
56	Levon Bashoyan	(Armenia)	MF	15 September 2005 (aged 18)	Academy	2022		3	0
	Gor Lulukyan	(Armenia)	MF	2 January 2003 (aged 21)	Academy	2020		19	2
	Hamlet Sargsyan	(Armenia)	MF	20 May 2004 (aged 20)	Academy	2022		1	0
	Edik Vardanyan	(Armenia)	FW	25 March 2005 (aged 19)	Academy	2022		1	0
Players who left during the season
2	Nana Antwi	(Ghana)	DF	10 August 2000 (aged 23)	Lori	2021		83	2
8	Ugochukwu Iwu	(Armenia)	MF	28 November 1999 (aged 24)	Lori	2020		97	9
11	Narek Grigoryan	(Armenia)	FW	17 June 2001 (aged 22)	Academy	2019		68	15
13	Ivan Zotko	(Ukraine)	DF	9 July 1996 (aged 27)	Kryvbas Kryvyi Rih	2023		22	2
17	Eduardo Teixeira	(Brazil)	MF	7 June 1993 (aged 30)	Braga	2023		13	1
23	Aras Özbiliz	(Armenia)	MF	9 March 1990 (aged 34)	Unattached	2023		25	7
28	Pavel Mogilevets	(Russia)	MF	25 January 1993 (aged 31)	Unattached	2023		12	0
33	Marcos Júnior	(Brazil)	MF	13 May 1995 (aged 29)	Volta Redonda	2022		57	4
55	Artyom Maksimenko	(Russia)	FW	27 May 1998 (aged 25)	Ural Yekaterinburg	2023		24	7
99	Yaya Sanogo	(France)	FW	27 January 1993 (aged 31)	Unattached	2023		17	7
	Robert Baghramyan	(Armenia)	MF	29 June 2002 (aged 21)	BKMA Yerevan	2020		4	0

== Transfers ==
=== In ===
Date	Position	Nationality	Name	From	Fee	Ref.
23 June 2023	MF	(Armenia)	Mikayel Mirzoyan	BKMA Yerevan	Undisclosed	
28 June 2023	GK	(Russia)	Dmitry Abakumov	Unattached	Free	
2 July 2023	FW	(Russia)	Artyom Maksimenko	Ural Yekaterinburg	Undisclosed	
8 July 2023	MF	(Russia)	Pavel Mogilevets	Unattached	Free	
9 July 2023	MF	(Brazil)	Eduardo Teixeira	Braga	Undisclosed	
10 July 2023	DF	(Montenegro)	Periša Pešukić	Novi Pazar	Undisclosed	
25 July 2023	DF	(Serbia)	Uroš Stojanović	Radnik Surdulica	Undisclosed	
26 August 2023	FW	(Russia)	Nikolai Prudnikov	Mezőkövesd	Undisclosed	
5 September 2023	FW	(Armenia)	Gevorg Tarakhchyan	BKMA Yerevan	Undisclosed	
16 January 2024	MF	(Russia)	Vladislav Panteleyev	Arsenal Tula	Undisclosed	
18 January 2024	FW	(Argentina)	Álvaro Veliez	Deportivo Maipú	Undisclosed	
19 January 2024	DF	(Russia)	Aleksandr Putsko	Unattached	Free	
25 January 2024	MF	(Ukraine)	Andriy Kravchuk	Unattached	Free	
30 January 2024	MF	(Nigeria)	Luqman Gilmore	Liepāja	Undisclosed	
25 February 2024	MF	(Russia)	Aleksandr Dolgov	Unattached	Free	
26 February 2024	MF	(Russia)	Denis Glushakov	Unattached	Free	

=== Out ===
Date	Position	Nationality	Name	To	Fee	Ref.
12 July 2023	MF	(Armenia)	Robert Baghramyan	Noah	Undisclosed	
29 August 2023	FW	(Armenia)	Narek Grigoryan	Farul Constanța	Undisclosed	
12 January 2024	FW	(Ghana)	Nana Antwi	FCSB	Undisclosed	

=== Loans out ===
Date from	Position	Nationality	Name	To	Date to	Ref.
2 February 2022	DF	(Armenia)	Erik Simonyan	BKMA Yerevan	10 January 2024	
12 July 2023	DF	(Armenia)	Khariton Azvazyan	BKMA Yerevan	10 January 2024	
19 January 2024	MF	(Armenia)	Levon Bashoyan	BKMA Yerevan	End of the season	
19 January 2024	MF	(Armenia)	Garnik Minasyan	BKMA Yerevan	End of the season	
23 February 2024	DF	(Nigeria)	Barry Isaac	West Armenia	End of the season	

=== Released ===
Date	Position	Nationality	Name	Joined	Date	Ref
9 June 2023	GK	(Armenia)	Arsen Beglaryan	Ararat-Armenia	9 June 2023	
10 June 2023	DF	(Ukraine)	Vadym Paramonov	Alashkert	16 February 2024	
10 June 2023	FW	(Russia)	Maksim Mayrovich	Chelyabinsk		
19 June 2023	MF	(Russia)	David Khurtsidze	Alashkert	27 June 2023	
27 June 2023	DF	(Brazil)	Rafael Carioca	Floresta	11 July 2023	
30 June 2023	FW	(Ukraine)	Dmytro Khlyobas	Kyzylzhar		
16 July 2023	MF	(Armenia)	Ugochukwu Iwu	Rubin Kazan	16 July 2023	
22 November 2023	MF	(Armenia)	Aras Özbiliz	Retirement		
15 December 2023	MF	(Brazil)	Marcos Júnior	Náutico	22 December 2023	
20 December 2023	MF	(Brazil)	Eduardo Teixeira	Amazonas	3 January 2024	
29 December 2023	MF	(Ukraine)	Ivan Zotko	Sūduva		
29 December 2023	FW	(Russia)	Artyom Maksimenko	Sokol Saratov	29 December 2023	
31 December 2023	MF	(Russia)	Pavel Mogilevets			
26 January 2024	FW	(France)	Yaya Sanogo	Qingdao Red Lions		
26 May 2024	MF	(Russia)	Vladislav Panteleyev	Media Football League		
26 May 2024	MF	(Russia)	Denis Glushakov	Khimki	27 June 2024	
31 May 2024	MF	(Burkina Faso)	Dramane Salou	Hapoel Haifa	4 July 2024	

== Friendlies ==
30 January 2024	Astana	0–0	Urartu	United Arab Emirates
16:00 (UTC+4)		Report

2 February 2024	Jeonbuk Hyundai Motors	3–1	Urartu	United Arab Emirates
18:00 (UTC+4)	Lee.J-Y 47'; Orobó 54'; Lee.D-J 68'	Report	Mirzoyan

5 February 2024	Torpedo Moscow	6–2	Urartu	United Arab Emirates
17:00 (UTC+4)	Gongadze 29'; Melekestsev 47', 87'; Gromyko 67'; Kostin 71'; Shamkin 89'	Report	Tarakhchyan 37', 63'

8 February 2024	Dubai City	1–7	Urartu	Dubai, United Arab Emirates
11:00 (UTC+4)		Report		Stadium: Al Hamriyah Cultural and Sports Club

8 February 2024	Lokomotiv Moscow	2–1	Urartu	Dubai, United Arab Emirates
18:30 (UTC+4)	23'; 83'	Report	79' (o.g.)	Stadium: Jerel Ali Sports Centre

== Competitions ==
=== Overview ===
Competition	First match	Last match	Starting round	Final position	Record							
Competition	First match	Last match	Starting round	Final position	Pld	W	D	L	GF	GA	GD	Win %
Premier League	30 July 2023	24 May 2024	Matchday 1	4th	36	13	11	12	49	49	+0	36.11
Armenian Cup	12 March 2024	12 May 2024	Quarterfinal	Runners Up	3	2	1	0	7	2	+5	66.67
Supercup	7 October 2023		Final	Runners Up	1	0	1	0	0	0	+0	0.00
UEFA Champions League	11 July 2023	18 July 2023	First qualifying round	First qualifying round	2	1	0	1	3	3	+0	50.00
UEFA Europa Conference League	27 July 2023	3 August 2023	Second qualifying round	Second qualifying round	2	0	0	2	4	6	−2	0.00
Total					44	16	13	15	63	60	+3	36.36

Last updated: 24 May 2024
Source: Competitions

=== Supercup ===
7 October 2023	Shirak	0–0 (a.e.t.) (6–5 p)	Urartu	Armavir
15:00 (UTC+4)	Doh (yellow card) 29'; Traore (yellow card) 39'	Report	Dzhikiya (yellow card) 20'; Salou (yellow card) 56' (yellow-red card) 90+2'; Sanogo (yellow card) 105+4'; Agasaryan (yellow card) 109'	Stadium: City Stadium; Referee: Yura Mahtesyan
	Penalties
	R.Darbinyan (penalty missed); Mryan (penalty scored); Urushanyan (penalty scored); Mkoyan (penalty scored); Vukašinović (penalty scored); L.Darbinyan (penalty scored); Ghukasyan (penalty missed); Mnatsakanyan (penalty scored)		(penalty scored) Özbiliz; (penalty scored) Margaryan; (penalty missed) Agasaryan; (penalty scored) Sabua; (penalty scored) Sanogo; (penalty scored) Piloyan; (penalty missed) Marcos Júnior; (penalty missed) Tsymbalyuk

=== Premier League ===
==== Results summary ====
Overall								Home						Away					
Pld	W	D	L	GF	GA	GD	Pts	W	D	L	GF	GA	GD	W	D	L	GF	GA	GD
36	13	11	12	49	49	0	50	8	6	4	28	20	+8	5	5	8	21	29	−8

Last updated: 24 May 2024.
Source: See Results

==== Results by round ====
Round	1	2	3	4	5	6	7	8	9	10	11	12	13	14	15	16	17	18	19	20	21	22	23	24	25	26	27	28	29	30	31	32	33	34	35	36
Ground	A	H	A	H	A	A	A	H	A	H	A	H	A	H	H	H	A	H	A	H	A	H	A	H	A	H	A	H	A	H	A	H	A	H	A	H
Result	W	W	L	D	W	W	L	W	D	W	W	W	L	D	L	W	D	W	L	L	D	D	L	L	W	D	D	W	L	L	L	D	L	W	D	D
Position	4	1	3	3	3	3	3	3	4	3	2	2	2	4	4	4	4	4	4	4	4	4	4	4	4	4	4	4	4	4	4	4	4	4	4	4

Updated to match(es) played on 24 May 2024. Source: See Results
A = Away; H = Home; W = Win; D = Draw; L = Loss

==== Results ====
30 July 2023 1	BKMA Yerevan	1–2	Urartu	Yerevan
18:00 (UTC+4)	G.Petrosyan (yellow card) 45+1'; Ayvazyan 78'; Aghbalyan (yellow card) 84'; Hovhannisyan (yellow card) 90'; Tarakhchyan (yellow card) 90+6'; Ishkhanyan (yellow card) 90+6'	Report	Özbiliz 37', 87' (pen.); Dzhikiya (yellow card) 52'; Isaac (yellow card) 61'; Ghazaryan (yellow card) 82'	Stadium: FAA Stadium; Referee: Yura Mahtesyan

7 August 2023 2	Urartu	2–1	Ararat-Armenia	Yerevan
20:00 (UTC+4)	Margaryan (yellow card) 6'; Antwi 45+2'; Ghazaryan (yellow card) 75'; Dzhikiya 90+2'	Report	Beglaryan (yellow card) 58'; Avanesyan (yellow card) 60'; Yenne 70'; Serobyan (yellow card) 74'; Nondi (yellow card) 78'	Stadium: Urartu Stadium; Referee: Ashot Ghaltakhchyan

13 August 2023 3	Noah	2–0	Urartu	Armavir
19:00 (UTC+4)	Miranyan 45+3'; Vimercati (yellow card) 87'; Maia (yellow card) 90+12'; Baghramyan 90+13'	Report	Marcos Júnior (yellow card) 7'; Sabua (yellow card) 44'	Stadium: City Stadium; Referee: Artem Gasparyan

20 August 2023 4	Urartu	1–1	Pyunik	Yerevan
19:00 (UTC+4)	Salou 30' (yellow card) 90'; Piloyan (yellow card) 57'; Marcos Júnior (red card) 90+9'; Antwi (yellow card) 90+9'	Report	Otubanjo 26' (yellow card) 38'; Bratkov (yellow card) 53'; Kovalenko (yellow card) 64'; Malakyan (red card) 90+9'; Davidyan (yellow card) 90+9'	Stadium: Urartu Stadium; Referee: Henrik Nalbandian

26 August 2023 5	Shirak	0–2	Urartu	Gyumri
19:00 (UTC+4)	Urushanyan (yellow card) 23'; Mkoyan (yellow card) 24'; Pobulić (yellow card) 37'	Report	Piloyan 14'; Eduardo (yellow card) 22'; Özbiliz (yellow card) 42'; Antwi (yellow card) 60'; Stojanović (yellow card) 72'; Agasaryan (yellow card) 80'; Tsymbalyuk (yellow card) 90'; Grigoryan 90+2'	Stadium: City Stadium; Referee: Vardan Manukyan

1 September 2023 6	West Armenia	2–5	Urartu	Yerevan
17:00 (UTC+4)	Metoyan 4'; Eydison (yellow card) 7'; Gevorkyan (yellow card) 47' (goal) 85' (pen.); Mensalão (yellow card) 53'; Kharatyan (yellow card) 72'; Makhsudyan (yellow card) 90+4'	Report	Sabua 52' (pen.) (yellow card) 55'; Dzhikiya 70', 87' (pen.), 90+1'; Piloyan (yellow card) 82'; Maksimenko 90+7' (pen.)	Stadium: Junior Sport Stadium; Referee: Hovhannes Kalantaryan

15 September 2023 7	Alashkert	4–2	Urartu	Yerevan
16:00 (UTC+4)	Khurtsidze 54'; Kutalia 69'; Carrillo (yellow card) 74'; Biai 86'; Agdon 90+5'	Report	Ghazaryan (yellow card) 48' (goal) 90+1'; Eduardo (yellow card) 57'; Mirzoyan 78' (pen.); Piloyan (yellow card) 90+3'	Stadium: Alashkert Stadium; Referee: Zaven Hovhannisyan

19 September 2023 8	Urartu	3–1	Van	Armavir
16:00 (UTC+4)	Salou 12'; Dzhikiya 69' (pen.); Maksimenko 90+4'	Report	Boniface 24' (pen.); Mkrtchyan (yellow card) 38'; Yahaya (yellow card) 61'	Stadium: City Stadium; Referee: Artem Gasparyan

24 September 2023 9	Ararat Yerevan	1–1	Urartu	Yerevan
18:00 (UTC+4)	Samsonyan (yellow card) 9'; Ransom (yellow card) 37'; Hakobyan 39'; Harutyunyan (yellow card) 71'	Report	Dzhikiya 10'; Salou (yellow card) 22'; Sanogo (yellow card) 80'	Stadium: Republican Stadium; Referee: Henrik Nalbandian

28 September 2023 10	Urartu	2–1	BKMA Yerevan	Armavir
15:00 (UTC+4)	Piloyan (yellow card) 15'; Özbiliz 75' (pen.); Salou (yellow card) 78'; Sanogo 85'; Isaac (yellow card) 89'	Report	Petrosyan 52' (pen.); Khachumyan (yellow card) 74'; Alaverdyan (yellow card) 78'	Stadium: City Stadium; Referee: Zaven Hovhannisyan

3 October 2023 11	Ararat-Armenia	1–2	Urartu	Yerevan
17:00 (UTC+4)	Castanheira 11'; Yattara (yellow card) 16'; Bueno (yellow card) 44'; Nondi (yellow card) 52'; Alemão (yellow card) 62'; Grigoryan (yellow card) 81'; Scheid (yellow card) 90'; Ambartsumyan (yellow card) 90+5'	Report	Zotko (yellow card) 19'; Alemão 22' (o.g.); Prudnikov 54'; Tarakhchyan (yellow card) 70'; Salou (yellow card) 86'; Abakumov (yellow card) 89'	Stadium: FFA Stadium; Referee: Henrik Nalbandian

21 October 2023 12	Urartu	2–1	Noah	Yerevan
19:00 (UTC+4)	Polyakov (yellow card) 3'; Prudnikov 23'; Piloyan (yellow card) 38'; Agasaryan (yellow card) 43'; Sanogo (yellow card) 81'	Report	Maia (yellow card) 39'	Stadium: Urartu Stadium; Referee: Artem Gasparyan

25 October 2023 13	Pyunik	3–1	Urartu	Yerevan
15:00 (UTC+4)	Hendriks 17'; James 35'; Harutyunyan 44' (pen.); Buchnev (yellow card) 75'; Gonçalves (yellow card) 90+2'	Report	Tsymbalyuk (yellow card) 43'; Maksimenko 45+7'; Isaac (yellow card) 51'; Margaryan (yellow card) 90'; Marcos Júnior (yellow card) 90+2'; Antwi (yellow card) 90+5'	Stadium: Junior Sports Stadium; Referee: Zaven Hovhannisyan

30 October 2023 14	Urartu	2–2	Shirak	Yerevan
19:00 (UTC+4)	Agasaryan (yellow card) 16'; Sanogo 26'; Margaryan (yellow card) 42'; Zotko (yellow card) 57'; Prudnikov (yellow card) 67'; Dzhikiya 88' (pen.) (yellow card) 90+6'; Antwi (yellow card) 90+4'	Report	Mnatsakanyan (yellow card) 13' (goal) 90+7'; Kodia 24' (yellow card) 68'; Doh (yellow card) 45+2'; R.Darbinyan (yellow card) 57'; Vukašinović (yellow card) 87'	Stadium: Urartu Stadium; Referee: Artak Vardanyan

3 November 2023 15	Urartu	1–2	West Armenia	Yerevan
16:00 (UTC+4)	Maksimenko 36' (pen.); Zotko (yellow card) 64'; Pešukić (yellow card) 90+5'	Report	Kharatyan (yellow card) 69'; Tarasenko 90'; Caxambu (yellow card) 90+5'; Ufuoma (yellow card) 90+5'; Loretsyan 90+9' (pen.)	Stadium: Urartu Stadium; Referee: Vardan Vardumyan

8 November 2023 16	Urartu	1–0	Alashkert	Yerevan
19:00 (UTC+4)	Marcos Júnior (yellow card) 9'; Sanogo 55'; Salou (yellow card) 85'; Melikhov (yellow card) 90+5'	Report	Carrillo (yellow card) 73'	Stadium: Urartu Stadium; Referee: Artem Gasparyan

12 November 2023 17	Van	2–2	Urartu	Charentsavan
14:30 (UTC+4)	Boniface (yellow card) 10' (goal) 55'; Mkrtchyan (yellow card) 60'; Manucharyan (yellow card) 77'; Sani 90+10'; Okoronkwo (red card) 90+12'	Report	Dzhikiya 43'; Eduardo 86'; Marcos Júnior (red card) 90+2'; Tsymbalyuk (red card) 90+2'	Stadium: City Stadium; Referee: Ashot Ghaltakhchyan

29 November 2023 18	Urartu	2–1	Ararat Yerevan	Yerevan
18:00 (UTC+4)	Sanogo 10'; Piloyan (yellow card) 43'; Maksimenko 81'	Report	Mani 29'; Minasyan (yellow card) 90'	Stadium: Urartu Stadium; Referee: Zaven Hovhannisyan

4 December 2023 19	BKMA Yerevan	2–0	Urartu	Yerevan
18:00 (UTC+4)	Khamoyan (yellow card) 38'; G.Petrosyan 64'; Zotko 67' (o.g.); A.Petrosyan (yellow card) 78'	Report	Piloyan (yellow card) 15'; Ghazaryan (yellow card) 73'	Stadium: FAA Stadium; Referee: Henrik Nalbandian

9 December 2023 20	Urartu	1–3	Ararat-Armenia	Yerevan
18:00 (UTC+4)	Polyakov (yellow card) 37'; Piloyan (yellow card) 45+7'; Mirzoyan 90+8'	Report	Yattara 22' (pen.); Yenne 38', 45+6'; Muradyan (yellow card) 90+1'	Stadium: Urartu Stadium; Referee: Ashot Ghaltakhchyan

22 February 2024 21	Noah	1–1	Urartu	Armavir
18:00 (UTC+4)	Movsesyan 9'; Pablo (red card) 23'; Gamboš (yellow card) 90+4'	Report	Margaryan (yellow card) 30'; Polyakov (yellow card) 43'; Dzhikiya 58' (pen.)	Stadium: City Stadium; Referee: Henrik Nalbandian

27 February 2024 22	Urartu	1–1	Pyunik	Yerevan
19:00 (UTC+4)	Agasaryan (yellow card) 29' (yellow-red card) 45+10'; Pešukić 58'; Melikhov (yellow card) 90+5'	Report	Dashyan 5'; Juričić (yellow card) 90+6'	Stadium: Urartu Stadium; Referee: Artem Gasparyan

2 March 2024 23	Shirak	1–0	Urartu	Gyumri
15:00 (UTC+4)	Kodia (yellow card) 12'; Doh (yellow card) 30'; Misakyan (yellow card) 45'; Kone 55'; Vidić (yellow card) 62'; Manukyan (yellow card) 90+5'	Report	Tsymbalyuk (yellow card) 10'; Dzhikiya (yellow card) 69'	Stadium: City Stadium; Referee: Ashot Harutyunyan

8 March 2024 24	Urartu	1–2	West Armenia	Yerevan
18:00 (UTC+4)	Tarakhchyan 48'	Report	Guyganov (yellow card) 50'; Tarasenko 55'; Khachatryan (yellow card) 64'; Ufuoma (yellow card) 78'; Oparaocha 90'; Rybikov (yellow card) 90+5'	Stadium: Urartu Stadium; Referee: Zaven Hovhannisyan

16 March 2024 25	Alashkert	0–2	Urartu	Yerevan
15:00 (UTC+4)	Agdon (yellow card) 22'; Nalbandyan (yellow card) 72'; Fatai (red card) 88'; Sokhiyev (yellow card) 90+6'	Report	Dzhikiya (yellow card) 20'; Salou 33'; Glushakov (yellow card) 48'; Prudnikov 86'; Kravchuk (yellow card) 87'	Stadium: Alashkert Stadium; Referee: Yura Mahtesyan

30 March 2024 26	Urartu	1–1	Van	Yerevan
19:00 (UTC+4)	Dzhikiya 22'; Margaryan (yellow card) 64'; Melikhov (yellow card) 76'	Report	Granado (yellow card) 20'; Touré 77' (pen.)	Stadium: Urartu Stadium; Referee: Artak Vardanyan

3 April 2024 27	Ararat Yerevan	0–0	Urartu	Yerevan
19:00 (UTC+4)		Report	Dolgov (yellow card) 54'; Simonyan (yellow card) 57'; Veliez (yellow card) 85'	Stadium: Republican Stadium; Referee: Artem Gasparyan

13 April 2024 28	Urartu	2–1	BKMA Yerevan	Yerevan
18:00 (UTC+4)	Dolgov (yellow card) 45+4'; Dzhikiya 70'; Piloyan (yellow card) 82'; Simonyan 90+6'	Report	Arakelyan (yellow card) 65'; Aghbalyan (yellow card) 90'; Vardanyan 90+4'; Vardanyan (yellow card) 90+5'	Stadium: Urartu Stadium; Referee: Yura Mahtesyan

17 April 2024 29	Ararat-Armenia	2–0	Urartu	Yerevan
19:00 (UTC+4)	Yenne (yellow card) 27' (goal) 86' (pen.); Yattara 42'	Report	Pešukić (yellow card) 81' (red card) 85'; Salou (yellow card) 85'	Stadium: FFA Stadium; Referee: Ashot Harutyunyan

23 April 2024 30	Urartu	0–1	Noah	Yerevan
19:00 (UTC+4)	Salou (yellow card) 56'	Report	Hambardzumyan 29'; Maia (yellow card) 39'; Miljković (yellow card) 78'; Čančarević (yellow card) 90+2'	Stadium: Urartu Stadium; Referee: Henrik Nalbandian

28 April 2024 31	Pyunik	5–0	Urartu	Yerevan
16:00 (UTC+4)	Kovalenko 3'; Gonçalves 8'; Villela (yellow card) 25'; Hendriks (yellow card) 53' (goal) 90'; Davidyan 71'; Otubanjo 78'; Buchnev (yellow card) 90+4'	Report	Simonyan (yellow card) 29'; Stojanović (yellow card) 36'; Dolgov (yellow card) 55'	Stadium: Junior Sports Stadium; Referee: Vardan Manukyan

3 May 2024 32	Urartu	0–0	Shirak	Yerevan
19:00 (UTC+4)	Dzhikiya (yellow card) 84'; Margaryan (yellow card) 87'	Report	Kone (yellow card) 81'; Doh (yellow card) 81'	Stadium: Urartu Stadium; Referee: Ashot Ghaltakhchyan

7 May 2024 33	West Armenia	1–0	Urartu	Yerevan
16:00 (UTC+4)	Ufuoma (yellow card) 39'; Tarasenko 76'	Report	Sabua (yellow card) 62'	Stadium: Junior Sports Stadium; Referee: Davit Mkrtchyan

16 May 2024 34	Urartu	6–1	Alashkert	Yerevan
18:00 (UTC+4)	Sabua 8' (pen.); Ghazaryan (yellow card) 41' (goal) 50'; Gilmore (yellow card) 60'; Melkonyan 64', 79'; Prudnikov 66'; Pešukić (yellow card) 68'; Polyakov 90+4'	Report	Wbeymar 45+2'; Voskanyan (yellow card) 90+3'	Stadium: Urartu Stadium; Referee: Vardan Manukyan

20 May 2024 35	Van	1–1	Urartu	Charentsavan
17:00 (UTC+4)	Touré 16'; Hakobyan (yellow card) 51'; Boniface (yellow card) 80'	Report	Mirzoyan 44'; Agasaryan (yellow card) 55'; Simonyan (yellow card) 82'; Dzhikiya (yellow card) 83'	Stadium: City Stadium; Referee: Zaven Hovhannisyan

24 May 2024 36	Urartu	1–1	Ararat Yerevan	Yerevan
19:00 (UTC+4)	Melkonyan (yellow card) 45+2'; Tarakhchyan 61' (pen.); Gilmore (yellow card) 77'	Report	Grigoryan (yellow card) 6'; Mzoughi (yellow card) 51'; Doombia (yellow card) 62' (goal) 66'	Stadium: Urartu Stadium; Referee: Hovhannes Kalantaryan

==== League table ====
Pos	Team	Pld	W	D	L	GF	GA	GD	Pts	Qualification or relegation
1	Pyunik (C)	36	24	10	2	84	28	+56	82	Qualification for the Champions League first qualifying round
2	Noah	36	26	2	8	69	33	+36	80	Qualification for the Conference League first qualifying round
3	Ararat-Armenia	36	23	6	7	73	34	+39	75	Qualification for the Conference League second qualifying round (Note: Ararat-Armenia qualified for the Conference League second qualifying round by winning the 2023–24 Armenian Cup. Since they qualified based on league position, the second Conference League first round spot was passed to the fourth-placed team.)
4	Urartu	36	13	11	12	49	49	0	50	Qualification for the Conference League first qualifying round
5	Alashkert	36	13	6	17	54	56	−2	45	
6	Ararat Yerevan	36	13	6	17	39	50	−11	45	
7	West Armenia	36	11	4	21	43	73	−30	37	
8	Shirak	36	8	9	19	28	46	−18	33	
9	Van	36	8	8	20	32	67	−35	32	
10	BKMA	36	7	6	23	32	67	−35	27	

Source: FFA Soccerway
Rules for classification: 1) Points; 2) Head-to-head points; 3) Head-to-head goal difference; 4) Head-to-head goals scored; 5) Matches won; 6) Goal difference; 7) Less red cards; 8) Less yellow cards; 9) Fair-play ranking 10) Draw
(C) Champions

=== Armenian Cup ===
12 March 2024 Quarterfinal	Urartu	4–0	BKMA Yerevan	Yerevan
18:00 (UTC+4)	Kravchuk 6', 64'; Agasaryan 11', 70'	Report	Sargsyan (yellow card) 31'	Stadium: Urartu Stadium; Referee: Henrik Nalbandian

9 April 2024 Semifinal	Shirak	1–2	Urartu	Gyumri
19:00 (UTC+4)	R.Darbinyan (yellow card) 37'; Mryan 47' (yellow card) 90'; Vidić (yellow card) 71'; Kone (red card) 90'	Report	Kravchuk 7'; Dolgov 19' (yellow card) 90'; Stojanović (yellow card) 30' (yellow-red card) 90'; Veliez (yellow card) 48'; Gilmore (yellow card) 73'; Melikhov (yellow card) 75'	Stadium: City Stadium; Referee: Artem Gasparyan

12 May 2024 Final	Ararat-Armenia	1–1 (5–3 p)	Urartu	Yerevan
18:00 (UTC+4)	Ghazaryan 38' (o.g.); Nondi (yellow card) 88'; Serobyan (yellow card) 90'; Bueno (yellow card) 120+3'	Report	Mirzoyan 31'; Agasaryan (yellow card) 46'; Tsymbalyuk (yellow card) 65'; Margaryan (yellow card) 90+4'	Stadium: Vazgen Sargsyan Republican Stadium; Referee: Artem Gasparyan
	Penalties
	Yenne (penalty scored); Avanesyan (penalty scored); Duarte (penalty scored); Shaghoyan (penalty scored); Hovhannisyan (penalty scored)		(penalty scored) Simonyan; (penalty missed) Margaryan; (penalty scored) Piloyan; (penalty scored) Melkonyan

=== UEFA Champions League ===
==== Qualifying rounds ====
11 July 2023 First qualifying round 1st leg	Urartu (Armenia)	0–1	(Bosnia and Herzegovina) Zrinjski Mostar	Yerevan, Armenia
19:00 (UTC+4)	Margaryan (yellow card) 33'; Tsymbalyuk (yellow card) 90+5'	Report	Bilbija (yellow card) 50'; Barišić (yellow card) 52'; Stanić (yellow card) 66'; Zlomislić (yellow card) 78'; Senić 89' (yellow card) 90'	Stadium: Urartu Stadium; Attendance: 3,900; Referee: Philip Farrugia (Malta)

20 July 2023 First qualifying round 2nd leg	Zrinjski Mostar (Bosnia and Herzegovina)	2–3 (a.e.t.) (3–3 agg.) (4–3 p)	(Armenia) Urartu	Mostar, Bosnia and Herzegovina
22:00 (UTC+4)	Bilbija 27'; Kiš 94' (pen.); M.Marić (yellow card) 105'	Report	Salou (yellow card) 55'; Margaryan (yellow card) 70'; Grigoryan 74', 90+1' (pen.); Marcos Júnior (yellow card) 90+4'; Maksimenko 105+3'; Mirzoyan	Stadium: Stadion pod Bijelim Brijegom; Attendance: 5,000; Referee: Peter Kjaesgaard (Denmark)
	Penalties
	Kiš (penalty scored); Kožulj (penalty scored); Zlomislić (penalty missed); Senić (penalty scored); Barišić (penalty scored)		(penalty scored) Maksimenko; (penalty scored) Özbiliz; (penalty scored) Grigoryan; (penalty missed) Eduardo; (penalty missed) Ghazaryan

=== UEFA Europa Conference League ===
==== Qualifying rounds ====
27 July 2023 Second qualifying round 1st leg	Farul Constanța (Romania)	3–2	(Armenia) Urartu	Ovidiu, Romania
21:30 (UTC+4)	Băluță 27'; Mazilu 45+4'; M.Popescu (yellow card) 60'; Rivaldinho (yellow card) 84'; Larie 90+5'	Report	Maksimenko 23'; Piloyan (yellow card) 34'; Zotko 38' (yellow card) 43'; Grigoryan (yellow card) 59'; Antwi (yellow card) 77'; Agasaryan (yellow card) 90'	Stadium: Stadionul Viitorul; Attendance: 3,912; Referee: Martin Dohál (Slovakia)

3 August 2023 Second qualifying round 2nd leg	Urartu (Armenia)	2–3 (4–6 agg.)	(Romania) Farul Constanța	Yerevan, Armenia
20:00 (UTC+4)	Antwi 12'; Sabua 48'	Report	Nedelcu (yellow card) 28' (goal) 53'; M.Popescu (yellow card) 49'; Alibec 57', 90+2' (yellow card) 90'; Mazilu (yellow card) 85'	Stadium: Urartu Stadium; Attendance: 3,500; Referee: Tom Owen (Wales)

== Squad statistics ==
As of match played 24 May 2024

=== Appearances and goals ===
No.	Pos	Nat	Player	Total		Premier League		Armenian Cup		Supercup		Champions League		Europa Conference League	
No.	Pos	Nat	Player	Apps	Goals	Apps	Goals	Apps	Goals	Apps	Goals	Apps	Goals	Apps	Goals
3	DF	(Armenia) ARM	Erik Piloyan	37	1	26+3	1	2+1	0	1	0	2	0	2	0
4	DF	(Ukraine) UKR	Yevhen Tsymbalyuk	26	0	19	0	2	0	1	0	2	0	2	0
5	MF	(Burkina Faso) BFA	Dramane Salou	39	3	22+10	3	2	0	1	0	2	0	2	0
6	DF	(Armenia) ARM	Arman Ghazaryan	22	2	16+2	2	1+1	0	0	0	0+1	0	0+1	0
8	MF	(Russia) RUS	Denis Glushakov	12	0	8+2	0	2	0	0	0	0	0	0	0
9	MF	(Armenia) ARM	Narek Agasaryan	30	2	21+4	0	3	2	0+1	0	0	0	0+1	0
10	FW	(Armenia) ARM	Karen Melkonyan	5	2	2+1	2	0+1	0	0	0	0+1	0	0	0
11	FW	(Armenia) ARM	Gevorg Tarakhchyan	27	2	14+11	2	0+1	0	1	0	0	0	0	0
12	MF	(Nigeria) NGR	Luqman Gilmore	10	0	7+1	0	0+2	0	0	0	0	0	0	0
13	MF	(Russia) RUS	Vladislav Panteleyev	6	0	2+3	0	0+1	0	0	0	0	0	0	0
17	FW	(Russia) RUS	Aleksandr Dolgov	7	1	4+2	0	1	1	0	0	0	0	0	0
18	FW	(Russia) RUS	Leon Sabua	20	3	9+5	2	2	0	0+1	0	2	0	1	1
19	FW	(Russia) RUS	Nikolai Prudnikov	27	4	10+13	4	1+2	0	1	0	0	0	0	0
20	DF	(Montenegro) MNE	Periša Pešukić	20	1	13+4	1	2	0	0	0	0+1	0	0	0
21	MF	(Ukraine) UKR	Andriy Kravchuk	16	3	11+2	0	3	3	0	0	0	0	0	0
22	MF	(Armenia) ARM	Mikayel Mirzoyan	30	4	14+12	3	2	1	0	0	0	0	0+2	0
24	DF	(Serbia) SRB	Uroš Stojanović	22	0	18+2	0	2	0	0	0	0	0	0	0
30	FW	(Argentina) ARG	Álvaro Veliez	8	0	1+5	0	1+1	0	0	0	0	0	0	0
31	GK	(Russia) RUS	Dmitry Abakumov	8	0	8	0	0	0	0	0	0	0	0	0
33	DF	(Armenia) ARM	Alik Mkrtchyan	1	0	1	0	0	0	0	0	0	0	0	0
42	GK	(Russia) RUS	Aleksandr Melikhov	34	0	26	0	3	0	1	0	2	0	2	0
51	MF	(Armenia) ARM	David Ghiasyan	1	0	1	0	0	0	0	0	0	0	0	0
53	MF	(Armenia) ARM	Davit Harutyunyan	3	0	1+1	0	0+1	0	0	0	0	0	0	0
55	DF	(Armenia) ARM	Erik Simonyan	9	1	7	1	1+1	0	0	0	0	0	0	0
77	MF	(Russia) RUS	Temur Dzhikiya	37	11	17+15	11	0+1	0	1	0	0+1	0	0+2	0
88	DF	(Armenia) ARM	Zhirayr Margaryan	39	0	29+2	0	3	0	1	0	2	0	2	0
90	MF	(Russia) RUS	Oleg Polyakov	30	1	17+10	1	0	0	1	0	0+1	0	0+1	0
92	GK	(Russia) RUS	Aleksandr Mishiyev	2	0	2	0	0	0	0	0	0	0	0	0
99	DF	(Armenia) ARM	Khariton Ayvazyan	11	0	2+7	0	0+2	0	0	0	0	0	0	0
Players away on loan:
16	DF	(Nigeria) NGR	Barry Isaac	6	0	4+2	0	0	0	0	0	0	0	0	0
29	MF	(Armenia) ARM	Garnik Minasyan	1	0	0+1	0	0	0	0	0	0	0	0	0
56	MF	(Armenia) ARM	Levon Bashoyan	2	0	1+1	0	0	0	0	0	0	0	0	0
Players who left Urartu during the season:
2	DF	(Ghana) GHA	Nana Antwi	23	2	15+3	1	0	0	1	0	2	0	2	1
8	MF	(Armenia) ARM	Ugochukwu Iwu	1	0	0	0	0	0	0	0	1	0	0	0
11	FW	(Armenia) ARM	Narek Grigoryan	8	3	1+3	1	0	0	0	0	2	2	2	0
13	DF	(Ukraine) UKR	Ivan Zotko	13	1	8+2	0	0	0	0	0	1	0	2	1
17	MF	(Brazil) BRA	Eduardo Teixeira	13	1	6+6	1	0	0	0	0	0+1	0	0	0
23	MF	(Armenia) ARM	Aras Özbiliz	16	3	4+7	3	0	0	0+1	0	0+2	0	0+2	0
28	MF	(Russia) RUS	Pavel Mogilevets	12	0	4+4	0	0	0	1	0	1+1	0	1	0
33	MF	(Brazil) BRA	Marcos Júnior	21	0	8+8	0	0	0	0+1	0	2	0	2	0
55	FW	(Russia) RUS	Artyom Maksimenko	24	7	10+10	5	0	0	0	0	1+1	1	2	1
99	FW	(France) FRA	Yaya Sanogo	15	4	7+6	4	0	0	0+1	0	0+1	0	0	0

=== Goal scorers ===
Place	Position	Nation	Number	Name	Premier League	Armenian Cup	Supercup	Champions League	Europa Conference League	Total
1	MF	(Russia)	77	Temur Dzhikiya	11	0	0	0	0	11
2	MF	(Russia)	55	Artyom Maksimenko	5	0	0	1	1	7
3	FW	(France)	99	Yaya Sanogo	4	0	0	0	0	4
3	FW	(Russia)	19	Nikolai Prudnikov	4	0	0	0	0	4
3	MF	(Armenia)	22	Mikayel Mirzoyan	3	1	0	0	0	4
6	MF	(Armenia)	23	Aras Özbiliz	3	0	0	0	0	3
6	MF	(Burkina Faso)	5	Dramane Salou	3	0	0	0	0	3
6	FW	(Russia)	18	Leon Sabua	2	0	0	0	1	3
6	FW	(Armenia)	11	Narek Grigoryan	1	0	0	2	0	3
6	MF	(Ukraine)	21	Andriy Kravchuk	0	3	0	0	0	3
11	FW	(Armenia)	10	Karen Melkonyan	2	0	0	0	0	2
11	DF	(Armenia)	6	Arman Ghazaryan	2	0	0	0	0	2
11	FW	(Armenia)	11	Gevorg Tarakhchyan	2	0	0	0	0	2
11	DF	(Ghana)	2	Nana Antwi	1	0	0	0	1	2
11	MF	(Armenia)	9	Narek Agasaryan	0	2	0	0	0	2
16	DF	(Armenia)	3	Erik Piloyan	1	0	0	0	0	1
16	FW	(Brazil)	17	Eduardo Teixeira	1	0	0	0	0	1
16	DF	(Montenegro)	20	Periša Pešukić	1	0	0	0	0	1
16	DF	(Armenia)	55	Erik Simonyan	1	0	0	0	0	1
16	MF	(Russia)	90	Oleg Polyakov	1	0	0	0	0	1
16	FW	(Russia)	17	Aleksandr Dolgov	0	1	0	0	0	1
16	DF	(Ukraine)	13	Ivan Zotko	0	0	0	0	1	1
16				Own goal	1	0	0	0	0	1
				TOTALS	49	7	0	3	2	61

=== Clean sheets ===
Place	Position	Nation	Number	Name	Premier League	Armenian Cup	Supercup	Champions League	Europa Conference League	Total
1	GK	(Russia)	42	Aleksandr Melikhov	4	1	1	0	0	6
2	GK	(Russia)	31	Dmitry Abakumov	1	0	0	0	0	1
				TOTALS	5	1	1	0	0	7

=== Disciplinary record ===
Number	Nation	Position	Name	Premier League		Armenian Cup		Supercup		Champions League		Europa Conference League		Total	
Number	Nation	Position	Name	Booked	Sent off (straight red)	Booked	Sent off (straight red)	Booked	Sent off (straight red)	Booked	Sent off (straight red)	Booked	Sent off (straight red)	Booked	Sent off (straight red)
3	(Armenia)	DF	Erik Piloyan	9	0	0	0	0	0	0	0	1	0	10	0
4	(Ukraine)	DF	Yevhen Tsymbalyuk	3	1	1	0	0	0	1	0	0	0	5	1
5	(Burkina Faso)	MF	Dramane Salou	7	0	0	0	2	1	1	0	0	0	10	1
6	(Armenia)	DF	Arman Ghazaryan	5	0	0	0	0	0	0	0	0	0	5	0
8	(Russia)	MF	Denis Glushakov	1	0	0	0	0	0	0	0	0	0	1	0
9	(Armenia)	MF	Narek Agasaryan	6	1	1	0	1	0	0	0	1	0	9	1
10	(Armenia)	FW	Karen Melkonyan	1	0	0	0	0	0	0	0	0	0	1	0
11	(Armenia)	FW	Gevorg Tarakhchyan	1	0	0	0	0	0	0	0	0	0	1	0
12	(Nigeria)	MF	Luqman Gilmore	2	0	1	0	0	0	0	0	0	0	3	0
17	(Russia)	FW	Aleksandr Dolgov	3	0	1	0	0	0	0	0	0	0	4	0
18	(Russia)	FW	Leon Sabua	3	0	0	0	0	0	0	0	0	0	3	0
19	(Russia)	FW	Nikolai Prudnikov	1	0	0	0	0	0	0	0	0	0	1	0
20	(Montenegro)	DF	Periša Pešukić	3	1	0	0	0	0	0	0	0	0	3	1
21	(Ukraine)	MF	Andriy Kravchuk	1	0	0	0	0	0	0	0	0	0	1	0
22	(Armenia)	MF	Mikayel Mirzoyan	0	0	0	0	0	0	1	0	0	0	1	0
24	(Serbia)	DF	Uroš Stojanović	2	0	2	1	0	0	0	0	0	0	4	1
30	(Argentina)	FW	Álvaro Veliez	1	0	1	0	0	0	0	0	0	0	2	0
31	(Russia)	GK	Dmitry Abakumov	1	0	0	0	0	0	0	0	0	0	1	0
42	(Russia)	GK	Aleksandr Melikhov	3	0	1	0	0	0	0	0	0	0	4	0
55	(Armenia)	DF	Erik Simonyan	3	0	0	0	0	0	0	0	0	0	3	0
77	(Russia)	DF	Temur Dzhikiya	6	0	0	0	1	0	0	0	0	0	7	0
88	(Armenia)	DF	Zhirayr Margaryan	6	0	1	0	0	0	2	0	0	0	9	0
90	(Russia)	MF	Oleg Polyakov	3	0	0	0	0	0	0	0	0	0	3	0
Players away on loan:
16	(Nigeria)	DF	Barry Isaac	3	0	0	0	0	0	0	0	0	0	3	0
Players who left Urartu during the season:
2	(Ghana)	DF	Nana Antwi	4	0	0	0	0	0	0	0	1	0	5	0
11	(Armenia)	MF	Narek Grigoryan	0	0	0	0	0	0	1	0	1	0		
13	(Ukraine)	DF	Ivan Zotko	3	0	0	0	0	0	0	0	1	0	4	0
17	(Brazil)	MF	Eduardo Teixeira	2	0	0	0	0	0	0	0	0	0	2	0
23	(Armenia)	MF	Aras Özbiliz	1	0	0	0	0	0	0	0	0	0	1	0
33	(Brazil)	MF	Marcos Júnior	3	2	0	0	0	0	1	0	0	0	4	2
99	(France)	FW	Yaya Sanogo	2	0	0	0	1	0	0	0	0	0	3	0
			TOTALS	89	5	9	1	5	1	6	0	5	0	114	7
