= 2024 Armenian Cup final =

- Event: 2023–24 Armenian Cup
Ararat-Armenia	Urartu
1	1
- Date: 12 May 2024
- Venue: Republican Stadium, Yerevan
- Referee: Artem Gasparyan

The 2024 Armenian Cup final was the 33rd Armenian Cup Final, and the final match of the 2023–24 Armenian Cup. It was played at the Republican Stadium in Yerevan, Armenia, on 12 May 2022, and contested by Ararat-Armenia and Urartu, with Ararat-Armenia winning their first title.

== Match ==
=== Details ===
12 May 2024
18:00 AMT

Ararat-Armenia	1–1	Urartu
Ghazaryan 38' (o.g.)	Report	Mirzoyan 31'
Penalties
Yenne (penalty scored); Avanesyan (penalty scored); Duarte (penalty scored); Shaghoyan (penalty scored); Hovhannisyan (penalty scored)	5–3	(penalty scored) Simonyan; (penalty missed) Margaryan; (penalty scored) Piloyan; (penalty scored) Melkonyan

Republican Stadium, Yerevan
Referee: Artem Gasparyan

Ararat-Armenia	Urartu

GK	24	(Armenia) Arsen Beglaryan
DF	2	(Brazil) Alemão		(substituted off) 91'
DF	3	(Colombia) Junior Bueno	(yellow card) 120+3'
DF	14	(Brazil) Leonardo da Silva
DF	22	(Armenia) Kamo Hovhannisyan
MF	8	(Argentina) Alexis Rodríguez		(substituted off) 63'
MF	10	(Russia) Armen Ambartsumyan		(substituted off) 99'
MF	19	(Armenia) Karen Muradyan
MF	20	(Kenya) Alwyn Tera		(substituted off) 87'
FW	9	(Armenia) Artur Serobyan	(yellow card) 90'	(substituted off) 91'
FW	15	(Nigeria) Tenton Yenne
Substitutes:
GK	30	(North Macedonia) Damjan Shishkovski
DF	5	(Armenia) Davit Terteryan
FW	7	(Portugal) Adriano Castanheira
MF	11	(Colombia) Jonathan Duarte		(substituted on) 91'
MF	12	(Kenya) Amos Nondi	(yellow card) 88'	(substituted on) 87'
MF	13	(Russia) Nikolai Kipiani
DF	16	(Armenia) Edgar Grigoryan		(substituted on) 91'
FW	18	(Armenia) Artyom Avanesyan		(substituted on) 99'
MF	21	(Armenia) Narek Alaverdyan
MF	23	(Armenia) Zhirayr Shaghoyan		(substituted on) 63'
MF	36	(Armenia) Michel Ayvazyan
MF	77	(Armenia) Petros Avetisyan
Manager:
(Armenia) Vardan Minasyan

GK	42	(Russia) Aleksandr Melikhov
DF	4	(Ukraine) Yevhen Tsymbalyuk	(yellow card) 65'	(substituted off) 87'
DF	6	(Armenia) Arman Ghazaryan
DF	20	(Montenegro) Periša Pešukić
DF	55	(Armenia) Erik Simonyan
DF	88	(Armenia) Zhirayr Margaryan	(yellow card) 90+4'
MF	5	(Burkina Faso) Dramane Salou
MF	9	(Armenia) Narek Aghasaryan	(yellow card) 46'
MF	21	(Ukraine) Andriy Kravchuk		(substituted off) 30'
MF	22	(Armenia) Mikayel Mirzoyan		(substituted off) 62'
FW	18	(Russia) Leon Sabua		(substituted off) 62'
Substitutes:
GK	1	(Armenia) Mkhitar Umreyan
GK	92	(Russia) Aleksandr Mishiyev
DF	3	(Armenia) Erik Piloyan		(substituted on) 87'
FW	10	(Armenia) Karen Melkonyan		(substituted on) 117'
FW	11	(Armenia) Gevorg Tarakhchyan		(substituted on) 30' (substituted off) 117'
MF	12	(Nigeria) Luqman Gilmore
FW	19	(Russia) Nikolai Prudnikov		(substituted on) 62'
MF	77	(Russia) Temur Dzhikiya		(substituted on) 62'
MF	90	(Russia) Oleg Polyakov
DF	99	(Armenia) Khariton Ayvazyan
Manager:
(Russia) Dmitri Gunko

Man of the Match:

Assistant referees:
Mesrop Ghazaryan
Atom Sevgulyan
Fourth official:
Ashit Ghaltakhchyan
VAR:
Zaven Hovhannisyan
VAR assistant:
Henrik Matevosyan

Match rules

- 90 minutes
- 30 minutes of extra time if necessary
- Penalty shoot-out if scores still level
- Twelve named substitutes
- Maximum of five substitutions, with a sixth allowed in extra time
