= 2022–23 FC Urartu season =

Urartu
2022–23 season
- CEO: Artur Sahakyan
- Manager: Dmitri Gunko
- Stadium: Alashkert Stadium
- Premier League: 1st (champions)
- Armenian Cup: Winners
- Top goalscorer: League: Dmytro Khlyobas (9); All: Dmytro Khlyobas (10)
Home colours	Away colours

The 2022–23 season was FC Urartu's twenty-second consecutive season in the Armenian Premier League.

== Season events ==
On 28 June, Urartu announced the signing of Maksim Mayrovich on a free transfer from Noah.

On 4 July, Urartu announced the signing of Leon Sabua from Krasnodar.

On 22 July, Urartu announced the signings of Zhirayr Margaryan from Veres Rivne and Everson from Goiás. The following day, 23 July, Yevgeni Nazarov joined from Bohemians 1905.

On 3 August, Urartu announced the signing of Aleksandr Melikhov from Akhmat Grozny.

On 11 August, Urartu announced the signing of Marcos Júnior from Volta Redonda.

On 26 August, Urartu announced the loan signing of Buiu from Noroeste.

On 1 September, Yevgeni Nazarov left Urartu by mutual consent having played twice for the club.

On 9 September, Urartu announced the signing of David Khurtsidze from Alashkert.

On 13 December, Everson left Urartu by mutual consent having played five times for the club.

On 20 December, Edgar Grigoryan left Urartu by mutual consent having played five times for the club.

On the 29 December, Erik Vardanyan announced his retirement from football due to a knee injury, and that he would become a football scout for Urartu.

On 17 January, Urartu announced the signing of Aras Özbiliz.

On 25 January, Urartu announced the signing of Rafael Carioca from América de Natal.

On 27 January, Urartu announced the signing of free-agent Yaya Sanogo.

On 4 February, Urartu announced the signing of Ivan Zotko from Kryvbas Kryvyi Rih.

On 11 February, Urartu announced the signing of Dramane Salou who'd previously played for Noah.

On 21 February, Temur Dzhikiya joined Urartu on loan from Volga Ulyanovsk.

== Squad ==
As of match played 6 June 2023

Number	Name	Nationality	Position	Date of birth (age)	Signed from	Signed in	Contract ends	Apps.	Goals
Goalkeepers
22	Mkhitar Umreyan	(Armenia)	GK	23 September 2004 (aged 18)	Academy	2022		0	0
24	Arsen Beglaryan	(Armenia)	GK	6 January 1996 (aged 27)	Dnyapro Mogilev	2020		66	0
42	Aleksandr Melikhov	(Russia)	GK	23 March 1998 (aged 25)	Akhmat Grozny	2022		24	0
Defenders
2	Nana Antwi	(Ghana)	DF	10 August 2000 (aged 22)	Lori	2021		60	0
4	Yevhen Tsymbalyuk	(Ukraine)	DF	19 June 1996 (aged 26)	Desna Chernihiv	2022		27	4
6	Arman Ghazaryan	(Armenia)	DF	24 July 2001 (aged 21)	Academy	2019		44	1
31	Ivan Zotko	(Ukraine)	DF	9 July 1996 (aged 26)	Kryvbas Kryvyi Rih	2023		9	1
34	Erik Piloyan	(Armenia)	DF	29 January 2001 (aged 22)	Academy	2019		14	1
35	Rafael Carioca	(Brazil)	DF	18 July 1992 (aged 30)	América de Natal	2023		10	0
36	Khariton Ayvazyan	(Armenia)	DF	8 November 2003 (aged 19)	Academy	2020		30	0
38	Barry Isaac	(Nigeria)	DF	21 August 2001 (aged 21)	Right2Win SA	2022		1	0
67	Vadym Paramonov	(Ukraine)	DF	18 March 1991 (aged 32)	Rukh Lviv	2021		53	1
88	Zhirayr Margaryan	(Armenia)	DF	13 September 1997 (aged 25)	Veres Rivne	2022		58	4
Midfielders
8	Ugochukwu Iwu	(Armenia)	MF	28 November 1999 (aged 23)	Lori	2020		93	7
9	Narek Agasaryan	(Armenia)	MF	15 July 2001 (aged 21)	Academy	2021		68	1
17	Garnik Minasyan	(Armenia)	MF	12 July 2005 (aged 17)	Academy	2022		1	0
19	Sergey Mkrtchyan	(Armenia)	MF	26 June 2001 (aged 21)	Academy	2021		51	3
20	Artur Israelyan	(Armenia)	MF	16 January 2004 (aged 19)	Academy	2022		1	0
23	Aras Özbiliz	(Armenia)	MF	9 March 1990 (aged 33)	Unattached	2023		9	4
25	Dramane Salou	(Burkina Faso)	MF	22 May 1998 (aged 25)	Unattached	2023		11	0
27	David Khurtsidze	(Russia)	MF	4 July 1993 (aged 29)	Alashkert	2022		31	4
28	David Ghiasyan	(Armenia)	MF	21 April 2006 (aged 17)	Academy	2022		1	0
33	Marcos Júnior	(Brazil)	MF	13 May 1995 (aged 28)	Volta Redonda	2022		36	4
39	Levon Bashoyan	(Armenia)	MF	15 September 2005 (aged 17)	Academy	2022		1	0
77	Temur Dzhikiya	(Russia)	MF	8 May 1998 (aged 25)	on loan from Volga Ulyanovsk	2023	2023	7	4
90	Oleg Polyakov	(Russia)	MF	29 November 1990 (aged 32)	Armavir	2020		91	8
Forwards
10	Karen Melkonyan	(Armenia)	FW	25 March 1999 (aged 24)	Academy	2017		154	14
13	Dmytro Khlyobas	(Ukraine)	FW	9 May 1994 (aged 29)	Ordabasy	2022		41	13
15	Maksim Mayrovich	(Russia)	FW	6 February 1996 (aged 27)	Noah	2022		29	9
16	Edik Vardanyan	(Armenia)	FW	25 March 2005 (aged 18)	Academy	2022		1	0
18	Leon Sabua	(Russia)	FW	1 September 2000 (aged 22)	Krasnodar	2022		23	7
21	Narek Grigoryan	(Armenia)	FW	17 June 2001 (aged 21)	Academy	2019		60	12
29	Edik Vardanyan	(Armenia)	FW	25 March 2005 (aged 18)	Academy	2022		0	0
55	Samvel Hakobyan	(Armenia)	FW	30 April 2003 (aged 20)	Academy	2020		4	1
99	Yaya Sanogo	(France)	FW	27 January 1993 (aged 30)	Unattached	2023		1	2
Players away on loan
20	Gor Lulukyan	(Armenia)	MF	2 January 2003 (aged 20)	Academy	2020		19	2
28	Robert Baghramyan	(Armenia)	MF	29 June 2002 (aged 20)	BKMA Yerevan	2020		4	0
29	Hamlet Sargsyan	(Armenia)	MF	20 May 2004 (aged 19)	Academy	2022		1	0
77	Erik Simonyan	(Armenia)	DF	12 June 2003 (aged 19)	Academy	2019		5	0
Players who left during the season
5	Yevgeni Nazarov	(Russia)	DF	7 April 1997 (aged 26)	Bohemians 1905	2022		2	0
17	Tigran Ayunts	(Armenia)	MF	15 March 2000 (aged 23)	Academy	2017		6	0
23	Erik Vardanyan	(Armenia)	MF	7 June 1998 (aged 24)	Sochi	2022		7	0
25	Edgar Grigoryan	(Armenia)	DF	25 August 1998 (aged 24)	Academy	2019		51	0
30	Everson	(Brazil)	DF	24 July 1997 (aged 25)	Goiás	2022		5	0
38	Buiu	(Brazil)	FW	24 June 2004 (aged 18)	on loan from Noroeste	2022		1	0

== Transfers ==
=== In ===
Date	Position	Nationality	Name	From	Fee	Ref.
28 June 2022	FW	(Russia)	Maksim Mayrovich	Noah	Free	
4 July 2022	FW	(Russia)	Leon Sabua	Krasnodar	Undisclosed	
22 July 2022	DF	(Armenia)	Zhirayr Margaryan	Veres Rivne	Undisclosed	
22 July 2022	DF	(Brazil)	Everson	Goiás	Undisclosed	
23 July 2022	DF	(Russia)	Yevgeni Nazarov	Bohemians 1905	Undisclosed	
3 August 2022	GK	(Russia)	Aleksandr Melikhov	Akhmat Grozny	Undisclosed	
11 August 2022	MF	(Brazil)	Marcos Júnior	Volta Redonda	Undisclosed	
9 September 2022	MF	(Russia)	David Khurtsidze	Alashkert	Undisclosed	
17 January 2023	MF	(Armenia)	Aras Özbiliz	Unattached	Free	
25 January 2023	DF	(Brazil)	Rafael Carioca	América de Natal	Undisclosed	
27 January 2023	FW	(France)	Yaya Sanogo	Unattached	Free	
4 February 2023	DF	(Ukraine)	Ivan Zotko	Kryvbas Kryvyi Rih	Undisclosed	
11 February 2023	MF	(Burkina Faso)	Dramane Salou	Unattached	Free	

=== Loans in ===
Date from	Position	Nationality	Name	From	Date to	Ref.
26 August 2022	FW	(Brazil)	Buiu	Noroeste	End of season	
21 February 2023	MF	(Russia)	Temur Dzhikiya	Volga Ulyanovsk	End of season	

=== Loans out ===
Date from	Position	Nationality	Name	To	Date to	Ref.
29 July 2022	MF	(Armenia)	Robert Baghramyan	Noah	End of season	
8 September 2022	MF	(Armenia)	Gor Lulukyan	BKMA Yerevan	End of season	
18 January 2023	MF	(Armenia)	Hamlet Sargsyan	BKMA Yerevan	End of season	

=== Released ===
Date	Position	Nationality	Name	Joined	Date	Ref.
4 July 2022	MF	(Armenia)	Hakob Hakobyan	Ararat-Armenia	10 July 2022	
6 July 2022	FW	(Armenia)	Artur Miranyan	Alashkert	5 February 2023	
6 July 2022	FW	(Haiti)	Jonel Désiré	Olympiakos Nicosia	6 July 2022	
29 July 2022	GK	(Armenia)	Anatoliy Ayvazov	Noah	31 July 2022	
1 August 2022	DF	(Russia)	Pyotr Ten			
1 September 2022	DF	(Russia)	Yevgeni Nazarov	Dinamo Samarqand	24 February 2023	
13 December 2022	DF	(Brazil)	Everson	Santa Cruz	20 January 2023	
20 December 2022	DF	(Armenia)	Edgar Grigoryan	Ararat-Armenia	12 January 2023	
29 December 2022	MF	(Armenia)	Erik Vardanyan	Retirement		

== Friendlies ==
2 February 2023	Urartu (Armenia)	4–2	(United Arab Emirates) United FC	Dubai, United Arab Emirates
16:00 (UTC+4)	Melkonyan; Júnior; Mayrovich; Grigoryan	Report	Goal	Stadium: Al Hamriya Training Ground

5 February 2023	Urartu (Armenia)	0–1	(Russia) Lokomotiv Moscow	Dubai, United Arab Emirates
17:30 (UTC+4)	(yellow card) 31'; E.Piloyan 76' (o.g.); (yellow card) 81'	Report

9 February 2023	Urartu (Armenia)	0–1	(Russia) Zenit St.Petersburg	Dubai, United Arab Emirates
17:00 (UTC+4)		Report	Sutormin 59'

12 February 2023	Urartu (Armenia)	7–2	(United Arab Emirates) Gulf United	Dubai, United Arab Emirates
(UTC+4)	Júnior; Iwu; Polyakov; Melkonyan; Ed.Vardanyan; N.Grigoryan	Report	Goal

== Competitions ==
=== Overall record ===
Competition	First match	Last match	Starting round	Final position	Record							
Competition	First match	Last match	Starting round	Final position	Pld	W	D	L	GF	GA	GD	Win %
Premier League	31 July 2022	6 June 2023	Matchday 1	Winners	36	26	5	5	68	25	+43	72.22
Armenian Cup	26 November 2022	13 May 2023	Quarterfinal	Winners	3	3	0	0	10	1	+9	100.00
Total					39	29	5	5	78	26	+52	74.36

Last updated: 6 June 2023
Source: Competitions

=== Premier League ===
==== Results summary ====
Overall								Home						Away					
Pld	W	D	L	GF	GA	GD	Pts	W	D	L	GF	GA	GD	W	D	L	GF	GA	GD
36	26	5	5	68	25	+43	83	12	2	4	26	16	+10	14	3	1	42	9	+33

Last updated: 6 June 2023.
Source: See Results

==== Results by round ====
Round	1	2	3	4	5	6	7	8	9	10	11	12	13	14	15	16	17	18	19	20	21	22	23	24	25	26	27	28	29	30	31	32	33	34	35	36
Ground	H	A	H	A	H	A	H	H	A	A	H	A	H	A	H	A	H (Note: matchday 18)	H (Note: matchday 19)	A (Note: matchday 20)	A (Note: matchday 17)	H	A	H	A	H	H	A	A	H	A	H	A	H	A	A	H
Result	W	W	L	W	L	W	D	W	W	W	W	W	W	W	W	D	W	L	W	W	W	W	W	W	W	L	D	D	W	W	W	W	W	L	W	D
Position	3	2	3	3	3	3	2	2	1	1	1	1	1	1	1	1	1	1	1	1	1	1	1	1	1	1	1	1	1	1	1	1	1	1	1	1

Updated to match(es) played on 6 June 2023. Source: See Results
A = Away; H = Home; W = Win; D = Draw; L = Loss; P = Postponed; V = Void

==== Results ====
31 July 2022 1	Urartu	1–0	Ararat-Armenia	Yerevan
20:30 (UTC+4)	Polyakov 59'; Everson (yellow card) 82'	Report	Ambartsumyan (yellow card) 37'; Lima (yellow card) 53'	Stadium: Urartu Stadium; Referee: Artem Gasparyan

8 August 2022 2	Shirak	0–2	Urartu	Gyumri
17:30 (UTC+4)	Kodia (yellow card) 81'	Report	Mayrovich 8'; N.Grigoryan (yellow card) 46'; Agasaryan (yellow card) 63'; Khlyobas 70'	Stadium: Gyumri City Stadium; Referee: Zaven Hovhannisyan

13 August 2022 3	Urartu	0–1	Van	Yerevan
20:30 (UTC+4)	Paramonov (yellow card) 75' (red card) 75'; Nazarov (yellow card) 89'; Beglaryan (yellow card) 90+5'	Report	Williams 8'; Harutyunyan (yellow card) 72'; Gorelov (yellow card) 90+5'	Stadium: Urartu Stadium; Referee: Ashot Ghaltakhchyan

20 August 2022 4	Noah	0–6	Urartu	Armavir
17:00 (UTC+4)	Danielyan (yellow card) 75'	Report	Polyakov 32' (yellow card) 86'; Sabua 44'; Mayrovich 70'; Khlyobas 76', 78', 82'; Ayvazyan (yellow card) 88'	Stadium: Armavir City Stadium; Referee: Vardan Manukyan

28 August 2022 5	Urartu	2–3	Lernayin Artsakh	Yerevan
20:30 (UTC+4)	Melkonyan 15'; Polyakov (yellow card) 19'; Margaryan 26'; Marcos Júnior (yellow card) 48'	Report	Palacios 7' (yellow card) 56'; Margaryan 71', 80' (o.g.); Sow (yellow card) 73'; Khachatryan (yellow card) 86'; Angulo (yellow card) 90+1'	Stadium: Urartu Stadium; Referee: Henrik Nalbandian

4 September 2022 6	BKMA Yerevan	1–4	Urartu	Yerevan
17:00 (UTC+4)	Mirzoyan 51'; Samsonyan (yellow card) 68'	Report	Mayrovich 18', 47', 81'; Mkrtchyan 26'	Stadium: FFA Stadium; Referee: Yura Mahtesyan

10 September 2022 7	Urartu	1–1	Alashkert	Yerevan
20:00 (UTC+4)	Khurtsidze 57'	Report	Galvão 16'; Mensah (yellow card) 32'	Stadium: Urartu Stadium; Referee: Zaven Hovhannisyan

19 September 2022 8	Urartu	2–1	Pyunik	Yerevan
20:00 (UTC+4)	Ghazaryan (yellow card) 24'; Kovalenko 54' (o.g.); N.Grigoryan 76'; Melikhov (yellow card) 88'	Report	Otubanjo 66'	Stadium: Urartu Stadium; Referee: Zaven Hovhannisyan

30 September 2022 9	Ararat Yerevan	0–2	Urartu	Yerevan
19:30 (UTC+4)	Hakobyan (yellow card) 55'; Galstyan (yellow card) 73'; Darbinyan (yellow card) 86'	Report	Tsymbalyuk (yellow card) 45+1'; Khlyobas 90' (yellow card) 90+1'; Sabua 90+4'; N.Grigoryan (yellow card) 90+4'	Stadium: Republican Stadium; Referee: Ashot Ghaltakhchyan

9 October 2022 10	Ararat-Armenia	0–1	Urartu	Yerevan
16:00 (UTC+4)	Tera (yellow card) 31'; St.Mkrtchyan (yellow card) 45+1'; Lima (yellow card) 56'; Wbeymar (yellow card) 70'; Muradyan (yellow card) 88'	Report	N.Grigoryan (yellow card) 27'; Antwi (red card) 34'; Agasaryan (yellow card) 40'; Sabua 45+1' (pen.); Polyakov (yellow card) 54'; Melikhov (yellow card) 81'; Tsymbalyuk (yellow card) 90+4'	Stadium: FFA Stadium; Referee: Henrik Nalbandian

15 October 2022 11	Urartu	1–0	Shirak	Yerevan
20:00 (UTC+4)	Tsymbalyuk (yellow card) 61'; Marcos Júnior 70'; Ghazaryan (yellow card) 73'; Khurtsidze (yellow card) 81'; Polyakov (yellow card) 90+1'	Report	Kodia (yellow card) 73'; Mryan (yellow card) 86'	Stadium: Urartu Stadium; Referee: Yura Mahtesyan

19 October 2022 12	Van	0–1	Urartu	Charentsavan
15:00 (UTC+4)	Gorelov (yellow card) 14'; N.Hovhannisyan (yellow card) 74'	Report	Asoyan 69' (o.g.); N.Grigoryan (yellow card) 72'	Stadium: Charentsavan City Stadium; Referee: Ashot Ghaltakhchyan

23 October 2022 13	Urartu	3–1	Noah	Yerevan
17:00 (UTC+4)	Mayrovich 11'; Mkrtchyan (yellow card) 26'; Marcos Júnior 74'; Ghazaryan (yellow card) 78'; Khlyobas 86'	Report	Friday 70'; Ebenezer (yellow card) 75'; Yesayan (yellow card) 89'; Nalbandyan (yellow card) 90+1'	Stadium: Urartu Stadium; Referee: Henrik Nalbandian

29 October 2022 14	Lernayin Artsakh	1–2	Urartu	Vayk
15:00 (UTC+4)	Ojetunde 5' (pen.) (yellow card) 56'; Khachatryan (yellow card) 32'; Obonde (yellow card) 58'; Palacios (yellow card) 85'	Report	Polyakov (yellow card) 23' (goal) 36'; Tsymbalyuk 44' (yellow card) 80'; Melkonyan (red card) 85'; Antwi (yellow card) 88'	Stadium: Arevik Stadium; Referee: Vardan Manukyan

4 November 2022 15	Urartu	1–0	BKMA Yerevan	Yerevan
19:00 (UTC+4)	Paramonov (yellow card) 71'; Marcos Júnior 76'; Khlyobas (yellow card) 86'	Report	Petrosyan (yellow card) 31'; H.Avagyan (yellow card) 65'; Khachumyan (yellow card) 90+4'	Stadium: Urartu Stadium; Referee: Henrik Nalbandian

10 November 2022 16	Alashkert	0–0	Urartu	Yerevan
14:00 (UTC+4)	James (yellow card) 11'; Yedigaryan (yellow card) 35'; T.Voskanyan (yellow card) 81'; Reyes (yellow card) 90+4'	Report	Margaryan (yellow card) 40'; Iwu (yellow card) 44'; Antwi (yellow card) 83'; Agasaryan (yellow card) 89'	Stadium: Alashkert Stadium; Referee: Ashot Ghaltakhchyan

22 November 2022 18	Urartu	2–1	Ararat Yerevan	Yerevan
18:00 (UTC+4)	Tsymbalyuk 6'; Melkonyan 34'	Report	Traoré 22'; Mkoyan (yellow card) 88' (red card) 88'	Stadium: Urartu Stadium; Referee: Artem Gasparyan

30 November 2022 19	Urartu	0–3	Ararat-Armenia	Yerevan
19:00 (UTC+4)	Iwu (yellow card) 17'; Khlyobas (yellow card) 37'	Report	Eza 13', 42'; Muradyan (yellow card) 25'; Bueno (yellow card) 31'; Duarte 57'; Ermakov (yellow card) 64'; Udo (yellow card) 75'; Agdon (yellow card) 85'	Stadium: Urartu Stadium; Referee: Henrik Nalbandyan

4 December 2022 20	Shirak	2–3	Urartu	Gyumri
18:00 (UTC+4)	Doumbia 19'; Kodia 36' (yellow card) 57'; Karapetyan (yellow card) 80'; Traore (yellow card) 90+4'	Report	E. Grigoryan (yellow card) 33'; N.Grigoryan 45', 90', 90+2'; Polyakov (yellow card) 90+3'	Stadium: Gyumri City Stadium; Referee: Zaven Hovhannisyan

9 December 2022 17	Pyunik	0–3	Urartu	Yerevan
18:00 (UTC+4)	Baranov (yellow card) 5'; Miljković (red card) 32'; Harutyunyan (yellow card) 72'	Report	Polyakov (yellow card) 12'; Agasaryan (yellow card) 48'; Iwu (yellow card) 51' (goal) 84'; Marcos Júnior 63'; Ghazaryan (yellow card) 70'; Khlyobas 90'	Stadium: Republican Stadium; Referee: Henrik Nalbandian

1 March 2022 21	Urartu	2–0	Van	Armavir
15:00 (UTC+4)	Grigoryan 43'; Mayrovich 60'; Agasaryan (yellow card) 71'; Ghazaryan (yellow card) 89'; Sabua (red card) 90+1'	Report	Barrios (yellow card) 38'; Asoyan (yellow card) 52'	Stadium: Armavir City Stadium; Referee: Zaven Hovhannisyan
Note: Match played at the Armavir City Stadium in Armavir, instead of Urartu's regular Urartu Stadium in Yerevan.

6 March 2023 22	Noah	0–2	Urartu	Armavir
15:00 (UTC+4)	S.Muradyan (red card) 27'; Danielyan (yellow card) 84'; Friday (yellow card) 90+1'; Ebenezer (yellow card) 90+3'	Report	Piloyan (yellow card) 12'; Zotko (yellow card) 23'; Margaryan 89'; Grigoryan 90+4' (pen.)	Stadium: Armavir City Stadium; Referee: Henrik Nalbandian

11 March 2023 23	Urartu	3–0	Lernayin Artsakh	Yerevan
18:00 (UTC+4)	Dzhikiya 27'; Tsymbalyuk 45'; Agasaryan (yellow card) 45+4'; Grigoryan 54' (pen.); Zotko (yellow card) 84'	Report	Ojetunde (yellow card) 43'; Dosa (yellow card) 50'	Stadium: Urartu Stadium; Referee: Ashot Ghaltakhchyan

16 March 2023 24	BKMA Yerevan	0–2	Urartu	Yerevan
18:00 (UTC+4)	Simonyan (yellow card) 13'; Aghbalyan (yellow card) 87'; Khachumyan (yellow card) 89'	Report	Agasaryan (yellow card) 11'; N.Grigoryan (yellow card) 63'; Dzhikiya 75', 90+6' (yellow card) 89'; Polyakov (yellow card) 77'	Stadium: FFA Stadium; Referee: Henrik Nalbandian

2 April 2023 25	Urartu	1–0	Alashkert	Yerevan
19:00 (UTC+4)	Melkonyan 37'; Khurtsidze (yellow card) 53'; Agasaryan (yellow card) 62'; Beglaryan (yellow card) 90+6'	Report	Rudoselsky (yellow card) 39'; Mužek (yellow card) 53'; Ustinov (yellow card) 83'; Čančarević (yellow card) 90+8'	Stadium: Urartu Stadium; Referee: Henrik Nalbandian

11 April 2023 26	Urartu	1–3	Pyunik	Yerevan
19:00 (UTC+4)	Ghazaryan 5' (pen.); Tsymbalyuk (yellow card) 39'; Zotko (yellow card) 56'	Report	Miljković 39'; Otubanjo 45+5'; Dashyan (yellow card) 49'; Désiré (yellow card) 51'; Juričić 66'; Caraballo (yellow card) 75'; Buchnev (yellow card) 90+7'	Stadium: Urartu Stadium; Referee: Artem Gasparyan

16 April 2023 27	Ararat Yerevan	0–0	Urartu	Yerevan
16:00 (UTC+4)	Mkoyan (yellow card) 90+4'	Report	Ghazaryan (yellow card) 37'; Zotko (yellow card) 67'	Stadium: Republican Stadium; Referee: Ashot Ghaltakhchyan

22 April 2023 28	Ararat-Armenia	2–2	Urartu	Yerevan
18:00 (UTC+4)	Serobyan 32'; Nondi (yellow card) 37'; Yenne 69'; Ambartsumyan (yellow card) 77'; Avanesyan (yellow card) 82'; E. Grigoryan (yellow card) 88'; Ermakov (yellow card) 90+4'	Report	Margaryan (yellow card) 30'; Sabua (yellow card) 56'; Paramonov (yellow card) 59'; Özbiliz 86'; Grigoryan 90+4'	Stadium: FFA Stadium; Referee: Henrik Nalbandian

27 April 2023 29	Urartu	3–1	Shirak	Yerevan
17:00 (UTC+4)	Khlyobas 6' (pen.); Piloyan 79' (yellow card) 79'; Melikhov (yellow card) 88'; Melkonyan 90'	Report	Kodia (yellow card) 67'; Hakobyan (yellow card) 69'; Cisse 89' (pen.); Tsarukyan (yellow card) 90+7'	Stadium: Urartu Stadium; Referee: Zaven Hovhannisyan

2 May 2023 30	Van	0–5	Urartu	Charentsavan
16:00 (UTC+4)	Manucharyan (yellow card) 12'; Sani (yellow card) 45+1'; Cifuentes (yellow card) 81'	Report	Khurtsidze 36'; Khlyobas (yellow card) 61'; Margaryan 70'; Piloyan (yellow card) 73'; Morello 77' (o.g.); Polyakov 82'; Sabua 86'; Carioca (yellow card) 88'	Stadium: Charentsavan City Stadium; Referee: Yura Mahtesyan

8 May 2023 31	Urartu	1–0	Noah	Yerevan
19:00 (UTC+4)	Özbiliz 49'; Sabua (yellow card) 63'; Marcos Júnior (yellow card) 89'	Report	Musakhanyan (red card) 77'; Llovet (yellow card) 90+1'; Melkonyan (yellow card) 90+6'	Stadium: Urartu Stadium; Referee: Vardan Manukyan

17 May 2023 32	Lernayin Artsakh	0–4	Urartu	Vayk
16:00 (UTC+4)	Harutyunyan (red card) 45+2'; Adamyan (yellow card) 48'	Report	Sabua 2', 50'; Zotko 45+5'; Salou (yellow card) 60'; Khlyobas 66'	Stadium: Arevik Stadium; Referee: Artem Gasparyan

22 May 2023 33	Urartu	1–0	BKMA Yerevan	Yerevan
19:00 (UTC+4)	Sabua 19'; Piloyan (yellow card) 83'; Khurtsidze (yellow card) 88'; N.Grigoryan (yellow card) 90+6'	Report	Simonyan (yellow card) 23'; Alaverdyan (yellow card) 54'; Grigoryan (yellow card) 64'; G.Petrosyan (yellow card) 79'	Stadium: Urartu Stadium; Referee: Yura Mahtesyan

27 May 2023 34	Alashkert	3–2	Urartu	Yerevan
17:00 (UTC+4)	Mužek 6'; Galvão 8'; Yedigaryan 66' (pen.); Agdon (yellow card) 71'; A.Grigoryan (yellow card) 90'	Report	Margaryan (yellow card) 63'; Khurtsidze (yellow card) 67'; Sanogo 74', 90+7'; Tsymbalyuk (yellow card) 79'; Ghazaryan (yellow card) 83'; Carioca (yellow card) 90+8'	Stadium: Alashkert Stadium; Referee: Vardan Manukyan

2 June 2023 35	Pyunik	0–1	Urartu	Yerevan
20:00 (UTC+4)	Davidyan (yellow card) 65'; Bratkov (yellow card) 88'; Miljković (yellow card) 90+5'; Juričić (yellow card) 90+5'	Report	Antwi (yellow card) 20'; Khurtsidze (yellow card) 55'; Salou (yellow card) 71'; Piloyan (yellow card) 77'; Melikhov (yellow card) 90+1'; Tsymbalyuk 90+3'; Ghazaryan (yellow card) 90+5'	Stadium: Republican Stadium; Referee: Henrik Nalbandian

6 June 2023 36	Urartu	1–1	Ararat Yerevan	Yerevan
17:00 (UTC+4)	Mayrovich 5'; Ayvazyan (yellow card) 23'; Carioca (yellow card) 44'; Marcos Júnior (yellow card) 68'; Ghazaryan (yellow card) 90+6'	Report	Ra.Hakobyan 24' (yellow card) 53'	Stadium: Urartu Stadium; Referee: Artem Gasparyan

==== Table ====
Pos	Team	Pld	W	D	L	GF	GA	GD	Pts	Qualification or relegation
1	Urartu (C)	36	26	5	5	68	25	+43	83	Qualification for the Champions League first qualifying round
2	Pyunik	36	25	5	6	72	23	+49	80	Qualification for the Europa Conference League first qualifying round (Note: The 2022–23 Armenian Cup winners qualified for the Europa Conference League first qualifying round. Since the cup winners (Urartu) qualified based on league position, the Europa Conference League spot was passed to the fourth-placed team.)
3	Ararat-Armenia	36	23	7	6	70	27	+43	76	Qualification for the Europa Conference League first qualifying round
4	Alashkert	36	20	6	10	58	37	+21	66	Qualification for the Europa Conference League first qualifying round
5	Van	36	11	7	18	38	59	−21	40	
6	Ararat Yerevan	36	10	8	18	29	42	−13	38	
7	Shirak	36	10	6	20	25	55	−30	36	
8	Noah	36	8	8	20	34	66	−32	32 (Note: Games won: Noah 8, BKMA 7.)	
9	BKMA	36	7	11	18	36	53	−17	32	
10	Lernayin Artsakh (R)	36	5	7	24	16	59	−43	22	Relegation to the Armenian First League

Source: FFA Soccerway
Rules for classification: 1) Points; 2) Head-to-head points; 3) Head-to-head goal difference; 4) Head-to-head goals scored; 5) Matches won; 6) Goal difference; 7) Less red cards; 8) Less yellow cards; 9) Fair-play ranking 10) Draw
(C) Champions; (R) Relegated

=== Armenian Cup ===
26 November 2022 Quarterfinal	Ararat-Armenia	0–4	Urartu	Yerevan
17:00 (UTC+4)	Lima (yellow card) 82'; Alemão (yellow card) 90+5'	Report	Mayrovich 10'; Beglaryan (yellow card) 74'; Khurtsidze 75'; Agasaryan (yellow card) 77'; Khlyobas 87'; N.Grigoryan 89'	Stadium: FFA Stadium; Referee: Zaven Hovhannisyan

6 April 2023 Semifinal	Urartu	4–0	Gandzasar Kapan	Yerevan
19:00 (UTC+4)	Melkonyan (yellow card) 58'; Margaryan 67'; Dzhikiya 70'; Özbiliz 87' (pen.), 90+1'; Marcos Júnior (yellow card) 89'	Report	Faye (yellow card) 32'; Paremuzyan (yellow card) 37'; Emmanuel (yellow card) 65'; Hovhannisyan (yellow card) 72'; Arakelyan (yellow card) 90+3' (yellow-red card) 90+3'	Stadium: Urartu Stadium; Referee: Yura Mahtesyan

13 May 2023 Final	Shirak	1–2	Urartu	Yerevan
19:00 (UTC+4)	Bakayoko 6' (yellow card) 65' (yellow-red card) 72'; Mryan (yellow card) 18'	Report	Khurtsidze 1'; Melkonyan 85'	Stadium: Republican Stadium; Referee: Andris Treimanis

== Statistics ==
As of match played 6 June 2023

=== Appearances and goals ===
No.	Pos	Nat	Player	Total		Premier League		Armenian Cup	
No.	Pos	Nat	Player	Apps	Goals	Apps	Goals	Apps	Goals
2	DF	(Ghana) GHA	Nana Antwi	29	0	23+4	0	2	0
4	DF	(Ukraine) UKR	Yevhen Tsymbalyuk	27	4	24+1	4	2	0
6	DF	(Armenia) ARM	Arman Ghazaryan	29	1	22+5	1	2	0
8	MF	(Armenia) ARM	Ugochukwu Iwu	35	1	31+1	1	3	0
9	MF	(Armenia) ARM	Narek Agasaryan	32	0	22+9	0	0+1	0
10	FW	(Armenia) ARM	Karen Melkonyan	34	5	22+9	4	2+1	1
13	FW	(Ukraine) UKR	Dmytro Khlyobas	28	10	6+19	9	1+2	1
15	FW	(Russia) RUS	Maksim Mayrovich	29	9	19+7	8	2+1	1
16	FW	(Armenia) ARM	Edik Vardanyan	1	0	0+1	0	0	0
17	MF	(Armenia) ARM	Garnik Minasyan	1	0	1	0	0	0
18	FW	(Russia) RUS	Leon Sabua	23	7	11+11	7	0+1	0
19	MF	(Armenia) ARM	Sergey Mkrtchyan	20	1	13+6	1	1	0
20	MF	(Armenia) ARM	Artur Israelyan	1	0	0+1	0	0	0
21	FW	(Armenia) ARM	Narek Grigoryan	35	9	21+11	8	1+2	1
23	MF	(Armenia) ARM	Aras Özbiliz	9	4	3+4	2	1+1	2
24	GK	(Armenia) ARM	Arsen Beglaryan	15	0	14	0	1	0
25	MF	(Burkina Faso) BFA	Dramane Salou	10	0	3+5	0	0+2	0
27	MF	(Russia) RUS	David Khurtsidze	30	4	17+10	2	3	2
28	MF	(Armenia) ARM	David Ghiasyan	1	0	0+1	0	0	0
31	DF	(Ukraine) UKR	Ivan Zotko	9	1	5+3	1	1	0
33	MF	(Brazil) BRA	Marcos Júnior	36	4	19+14	4	2+1	0
34	DF	(Armenia) ARM	Erik Piloyan	14	1	11+2	1	1	0
35	DF	(Brazil) BRA	Rafael Carioca	10	0	2+7	0	0+1	0
36	DF	(Armenia) ARM	Khariton Ayvazyan	9	0	4+5	0	0	0
38	DF	(Nigeria) NGR	Barry Isaac	1	0	1	0	0	0
39	MF	(Armenia) ARM	Levon Bashoyan	1	0	0+1	0	0	0
42	GK	(Russia) RUS	Aleksandr Melikhov	24	0	22	0	2	0
67	DF	(Ukraine) UKR	Vadym Paramonov	18	0	12+5	0	0+1	0
77	MF	(Russia) RUS	Temur Dzhikiya	7	4	5+1	3	0+1	1
88	DF	(Armenia) ARM	Zhirayr Margaryan	37	4	32+2	3	3	1
90	MF	(Russia) RUS	Oleg Polyakov	34	4	23+8	4	3	0
99	FW	(France) FRA	Yaya Sanogo	1	2	0+1	2	0	0
Players away on loan:
29	MF	(Armenia) ARM	Hamlet Sargsyan	1	0	0+1	0	0	0
Players who left Urartu during the season:
5	DF	(Russia) RUS	Yevgeni Nazarov	2	0	0+2	0	0	0
17	MF	(Armenia) ARM	Tigran Ayunts	1	0	0+1	0	0	0
25	DF	(Armenia) ARM	Edgar Grigoryan	9	0	3+6	0	0	0
30	DF	(Brazil) BRA	Everson	5	0	5	0	0	0
38	FW	(Brazil) BRA	Buiu	1	0	0+1	0	0	0

=== Goal scorers ===
Place	Position	Nation	Number	Name	Premier League	Armenian Cup	Total
1	FW	(Ukraine)	13	Dmytro Khlyobas	9	1	10
2	FW	(Armenia)	21	Narek Grigoryan	8	1	9
2	FW	(Russia)	15	Maksim Mayrovich	8	1	9
4	FW	(Russia)	18	Leon Sabua	7	0	7
5	MF	(Armenia)	10	Karen Melkonyan	4	1	5
6	MF	(Brazil)	33	Marcos Júnior	4	0	4
6	MF	(Russia)	90	Oleg Polyakov	4	0	4
6	DF	(Ukraine)	4	Yevhen Tsymbalyuk	4	0	4
6	MF	(Russia)	77	Temur Dzhikiya	3	1	4
6	DF	(Armenia)	88	Zhirayr Margaryan	3	1	4
6	MF	(Armenia)	23	Aras Özbiliz	2	2	4
6	MF	(Russia)	27	David Khurtsidze	2	2	4
13				Own goal	3	0	3
14	FW	(France)	99	Yaya Sanogo	2	0	2
15	MF	(Armenia)	19	Sergey Mkrtchyan	1	0	1
15	MF	(Armenia)	8	Ugochukwu Iwu	1	0	1
15	DF	(Armenia)	6	Arman Ghazaryan	1	0	1
15	DF	(Armenia)	34	Erik Piloyan	1	0	1
15	DF	(Ukraine)	31	Ivan Zotko	1	0	1
				TOTALS	68	10	78

=== Clean sheets ===
Place	Position	Nation	Number	Name	Premier League	Armenian Cup	Total
1	GK	(Russia)	42	Aleksandr Melikhov	13	1	14
2	GK	(Armenia)	24	Arsen Beglaryan	8	1	9
				TOTALS	21	2	23

=== Disciplinary record ===
Number	Nation	Position	Name	Premier League		Armenian Cup		Total	
Number	Nation	Position	Name	Booked	Sent off (straight red)	Booked	Sent off (straight red)	Booked	Sent off (straight red)
2	(Ghana)	DF	Nana Antwi	3	1	0	0	3	1
4	(Ukraine)	DF	Yevhen Tsymbalyuk	6	0	0	0	6	0
6	(Armenia)	DF	Arman Ghazaryan	9	0	0	0	9	0
8	(Armenia)	MF	Ugochukwu Iwu	3	0	0	0	3	0
9	(Armenia)	MF	Narek Agasaryan	8	0	1	0	9	0
10	(Armenia)	MF	Karen Melkonyan	1	0	1	0	2	0
13	(Ukraine)	FW	Dmytro Khlyobas	4	0	0	0	4	0
18	(Russia)	FW	Leon Sabua	2	1	0	0	2	1
19	(Armenia)	MF	Sergey Mkrtchyan	1	0	0	0	1	0
21	(Armenia)	FW	Narek Grigoryan	6	0	0	0	6	0
24	(Armenia)	GK	Arsen Beglaryan	2	0	1	0	3	0
25	(Burkina Faso)	MF	Dramane Salou	2	0	0	0	2	0
27	(Russia)	MF	David Khurtsidze	5	0	0	0	5	0
31	(Ukraine)	DF	Ivan Zotko	4	0	0	0	4	0
33	(Brazil)	MF	Marcos Júnior	3	0	1	0	4	0
34	(Armenia)	DF	Erik Piloyan	5	0	0	0	5	0
35	(Brazil)	DF	Rafael Carioca	3	0	0	0	3	0
36	(Armenia)	DF	Khariton Ayvazyan	2	0	0	0	2	0
42	(Russia)	GK	Aleksandr Melikhov	4	0	0	0	4	0
67	(Ukraine)	DF	Vadym Paramonov	3	1	0	0	3	1
77	(Russia)	MF	Temur Dzhikiya	1	0	0	0	1	0
88	(Armenia)	DF	Zhirayr Margaryan	3	0	0	0	3	0
90	(Russia)	MF	Oleg Polyakov	8	0	0	0	8	0
Players away on loan:
Players who left Urartu during the season:
5	(Russia)	DF	Yevgeni Nazarov	1	0	0	0	1	0
25	(Armenia)	DF	Edgar Grigoryan	1	0	0	0	1	0
30	(Brazil)	DF	Everson	1	0	0	0	1	0
			TOTALS	91	3	4	0	95	3
