= 2023 Armenian Supercup =

| Shirak | Urartu |
| 0 | 0 |
- Date: 7 October 2023
- Venue: City Stadium, Armavir
- Referee: Yura Mahtesyan

The 2023 Armenian Supercup was the 25th Armenian Supercup, an annual football match played between the previous season's Premier League and Armenian Cup winners, Urartu, and the previous season's Armenian Cup runners up, Shirak, with the later winning 6–5 on penalties after an initial 0–0 draw.

== Match details ==
7 October 2023
15:00 (UTC+4)

| Shirak | 0 – 0 (a.e.t.) | Urartu |
|---|---|---|
| | Report |

City Stadium, Armavir
Referee: Yura Mahtesyan

| Shirak | Urartu |

| GK | 1 | (Serbia) Darko Vukašinović |
| DF | 4 | (Armenia) Hamlet Mnatsakanyan |
| DF | 5 | (Armenia) Hrayr Mkoyan |
| DF | 26 | (Serbia) Aleksa Vidić | | (substituted off) 106' |
| DF | 99 | (Armenia) Robert Darbinyan |
| MF | 6 | (Armenia) Rafik Misakyan | | (substituted off) 106' |
| MF | 10 | (Serbia) Dimitrije Pobulić | | (substituted off) 86' |
| MF | 11 | (Armenia) Sergey Manukyan | | (substituted off) 59' |
| MF | 19 | (Ivory Coast) Junior Magico Traore | (yellow card) 39' | (substituted off) 72' |
| MF | 21 | (Ivory Coast) Donald Kodia |
| FW | 97 | (Ivory Coast) Cedric Doh | (yellow card) 29' | (substituted off) 72' |
Substitutes:
| GK | 96 | (Armenia) Sokrat Hovhannisyan |
| DF | 2 | (Armenia) Hovhannes Gevorgyan |
| DF | 7 | (Armenia) Seryozha Urushanyan | | (substituted in) 59' |
| MF | 8 | (Armenia) Levon Darbinyan | | (substituted in) 72' |
| FW | 9 | (Armenia) Lyova Mryan | | (substituted in) 106' |
| MF | 14 | (Armenia) Suren Tsarukyan |
| DF | 15 | (Armenia) Arsen Sadoyan | | (substituted in) 72' |
| MF | 18 | (Armenia) Samvel Ghukasyan | | (substituted in) 106' |
| MF | 22 | (Armenia) Narek Janoyan | | (substituted in) 86' |
| MF | 24 | (Russia) Artem Kiba |
| FW | 28 | (Armenia) Narek Khachatryan |
| DF | 44 | (Armenia) Tigran Sumbulyan |
Manager:
(Armenia) Arsen Hovhannisyan

| GK | 42 | (Russia) Aleksandr Melikhov |
| DF | 2 | (Ghana) Nana Antwi |
| DF | 3 | (Armenia) Erik Piloyan |
| DF | 4 | (Ukraine) Yevhen Tsymbalyuk |
| DF | 88 | (Armenia) Zhirayr Margaryan |
| MF | 5 | (Burkina Faso) Dramane Salou | (yellow card) 56' (yellow-red card) 90+2' |
| MF | 28 | (Russia) Pavel Mogilevets | | (substituted off) 86' |
| MF | 77 | (Russia) Temur Dzhikiya | (yellow card) 20' | (substituted off) 65' |
| MF | 90 | (Russia) Oleg Polyakov | | (substituted off) 65' |
| FW | 11 | (Armenia) Gevorg Tarakhchyan | | (substituted off) 72' |
| FW | 19 | (Russia) Nikolai Prudnikov | | (substituted off) 91' |
Substitutes:
| GK | 1 | (Armenia) Mkhitar Umreyan |
| GK | 31 | (Russia) Dmitry Abakumov |
| MF | 9 | (Armenia) Narek Aghasaryan | (yellow card) 109' | (substituted in) 91' |
| DF | 13 | (Ukraine) Ivan Zotko |
| DF | 16 | (Nigeria) Barry Isaac |
| FW | 18 | (Russia) Leon Sabua | | (substituted in) 86' |
| MF | 22 | (Armenia) Mikayel Mirzoyan |
| MF | 23 | (Armenia) Aras Özbiliz | | (substituted in) 72' |
| DF | 24 | (Serbia) Uroš Stojanović |
| MF | 33 | (Brazil) Marcos Júnior | | (substituted in) 65' |
| MF | 56 | (Armenia) Levon Bashoyan |
| FW | 99 | (France) Yaya Sanogo | (yellow card) 105+4' | (substituted in) 65' |
Manager:
(Russia) Dmitri Gunko

Assistant referees:
Mesrop Ghazaryan
Artur Gdlyan
Fourth official:
Artak Vardanyan

== See also ==
- 2022–23 Armenian Premier League
- 2022–23 Armenian Cup
