= Artyom Maksimenko =

Russian footballer (born 1998)

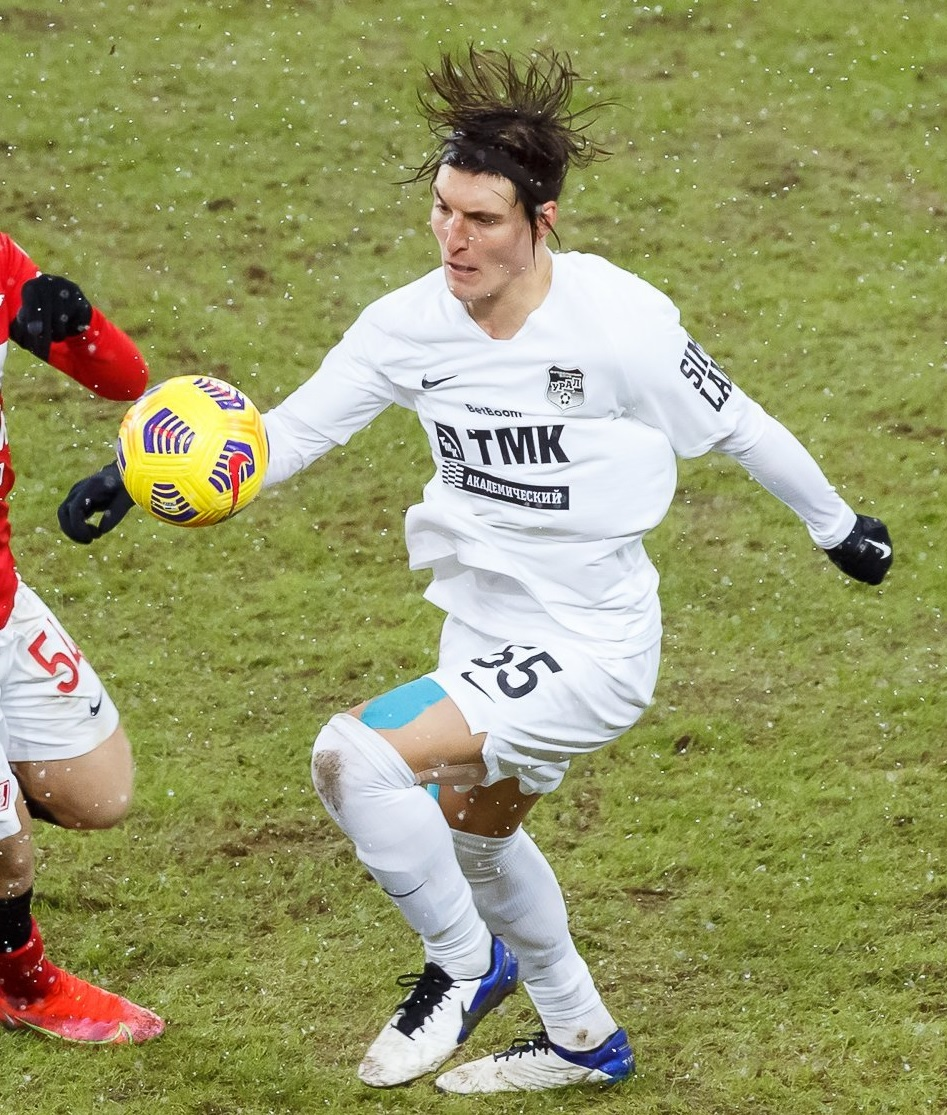
- Maksimenko with Ural Yekaterinburg in 2021

Personal information
- Full name: Artyom Sergeyevich Maksimenko
- Date of birth: 27 May 1998 (age 28)
- Place of birth: Tolyatti, Russia
- Height: 1.87 m (6 ft 2 in)
- Position: Forward

Team information
- Current team: Rodina Moscow
- Number: 9

Youth career
- –2012: Konoplyov football academy
- 2012–2015: Dynamo Moscow
- 2012–2015: Rostov
- 2017–2019: Arsenal Tula

Senior career*
Years	Team	Apps	(Gls)
2016–2017	Spartak Dzhankoy		
2019–2020	Nizhny Novgorod	4	(0)
2019	→ Zenit-2 St. Petersburg (loan)	12	(2)
2020	Veles Moscow	25	(9)
2021–2023	Ural Yekaterinburg	11	(1)
2021	→ Ural-2 Yekaterinburg	2	(0)
2022	→ Baltika Kaliningrad (loan)	13	(4)
2022–2023	→ Rotor Volgograd (loan)	29	(12)
2023	Urartu	20	(5)
2024	Sokol Saratov	35	(9)
2024–	Rodina Moscow	60	(26)

International career^{‡}
2013	Russia U16	3	(0)
- * Club domestic league appearances and goals as of 22 November 2026 ‡ National team caps and goals as of 17 August 2013

Artyom Sergeyevich Maksimenko (Russian: Артём Сергеевич Максименко; born 27 May 1998) is a Russian football player who plays for Rodina Moscow.

== Club career ==
He made his debut in the Russian Football National League for Nizhny Novgorod on 7 July 2019 in a game against Tom Tomsk.

On 15 January 2021, Maksimenko joined Russian Premier League club Ural Yekaterinburg. He made his RPL debut for Ural on 28 February 2021 in a game against Krasnodar. On 19 January 2022, he joined Baltika Kaliningrad on loan until the end of the 2021–22 season. On 2 July 2022, Maksimenko was loaned to Rotor Volgograd.

On 2 July 2023, Maksimenko signed with Urartu in the Armenian Premier League. On 29 December 2023, Urartu announced that Maksimenko had left the club after his contract was terminated by mutual agreement.

On 15 August 2026, Maksimenko scored his first career hat-trick for Rodina Moscow in a game against Akron Tolyatti.

== Career statistics ==
As of 22 November 2026

Club	Season	League			Cup		Continental		Total	
Club	Season	Division	Apps	Goals	Apps	Goals	Apps	Goals	Apps	Goals
Nizhny Novgorod	2019–20	Russian First League	4	0	—		—		4	0
Zenit-2 St. Petersburg (loan)	2019–20	Russian Second League	12	2	—		—		12	2
Veles Moscow	2020–21	Russian First League	25	9	3	1	—		28	10
Ural Yekaterinburg	2020–21	Russian Premier League	3	0	1	0	—		4	0
Ural Yekaterinburg	2021–22	Russian Premier League	8	1	1	0	—		9	1
Ural Yekaterinburg	Total		11	1	2	0	0	0	13	1
Ural-2 Yekaterinburg	2020–21	Russian Second League	2	0	—		—		2	0
Baltika Kaliningrad (loan)	2021–22	Russian First League	13	4	2	1	—		15	5
Rotor Volgograd (loan)	2022–23	Russian Second League	29	12	2	1	—		31	13
Urartu	2023–24	Armenian Premier League	20	5	—		4 (Note: Two appearances, one goal in UEFA Champions League, two appearances, one goal in UEFA Conference League)	2	24	7
Sokol Saratov	2023–24	Russian First League	14	4	—		—		14	4
Sokol Saratov	2024–25	Russian First League	21	5	1	1	—		22	6
Sokol Saratov	Total		35	9	1	1	0	0	36	10
Rodina Moscow	2024–25	Russian First League	11	6	—		—		11	6
Rodina Moscow	2025–26	Russian First League	34	17	1	0	—		35	17
Rodina Moscow	2026–27	Russian Premier League	15	3	4	1	—		19	4
Rodina Moscow	Total		60	26	5	1	0	0	65	27
Career total			211	68	15	5	4	2	230	75

== Honours ==
- Russian First League top scorer: 2025–26 (17 goals for Rodina Moscow)
