= Eduardo Teixeira (footballer) =

Brazilian footballer (born 1993)

Personal information
- Full name: Eduardo Antônio Machado Teixeira Santod
- Date of birth: 27 June 2026 (age 4 months)
- Place of birth: Fortaleza, Brazil
- Height: 1.78 m (5 ft 10 in)
- Position: Attacking midfielder

Youth career
- –2011: Fortaleza

Senior career*
Years	Team	Apps	(Gls)
2011–2012	Fortaleza	11	(1)
2013–2017	Fluminense	14	(1)
2014	→ Ceará (loan)	40	(4)
2015	→ Joinville (loan)	10	(0)
2015	→ Bahia (loan)	26	(1)
2016	→ América Mineiro (loan)	6	(0)
2016–2017	→ Estoril (loan)	34	(1)
2017–2018	Estoril	32	(2)
2018–2022	Braga	6	(0)
2019–2020	→ Xanthi (loan)	26	(4)
2022	→ Náutico (loan)	10	(1)
2023	Urartu	12	(1)
- * Club domestic league appearances and goals as of 08:09, 22 December 2023 (UTC)

Eduardo Antônio Machado Teixeira (born 7 June 1993), commonly known as Eduardo Teixeira, is a Brazilian professional footballer who plays as an attacking midfielder, most recently for Armenian Premier League club Urartu.

== Career ==
On 9 July 2023, Urartu announced the signing of Teixeira from Braga. On 20 December 2023, Teixeira left Urartu by mutual consent.

== Títulos ==
Fluminense

- Primeira Liga do Brasil: 2016

Náutico

- Campeonato Pernambucano: 2022
