= Everson (footballer, born 1997) =

Brazilian footballer

Personal information
- Full name: Everson Bispo Pereira
- Date of birth: 24 July 1997 (age 29)
- Place of birth: Salvador, Brazil
- Height: 1.89 m (6 ft 2 in)
- Position: Centre back

Youth career
- Bahia

Senior career*
Years	Team	Apps	(Gls)
2016–2022	Bahia	19	(0)
2019–2020	→ Portimonense (loan)	1	(0)
2020	→ Paraná (loan)	3	(0)
2022	Goiás	6	(0)
2022	Urartu	5	(0)

International career
2016	Brazil U20	1	(0)
- * Club domestic league appearances and goals as of 15 December 2022 (UTC)

Everson Bispo Pereira (born 24 July 1997), simply known Everson, is a Brazilian footballer who plays as a central defender.

== Career ==
=== Club ===
Everson made his professional debut for Bahia in a 1-1 Campeonato Brasileiro Série A tie with Coritiba on 20 September 2017. On 15 July 2019, Everson joined Portimonense on loan in the Portuguese Primeira Liga.

On 22 July 2022, FC Urartu announced the signing of Everson. On 13 December 2022, Everson left Urartu by mutual consent having played five times for the club.

=== International ===
Everson represented the Brazil U20s in a 2-1 win over the Uruguay U20s on 15 October 2016.
