= Oleg Polyakov =

Russian footballer

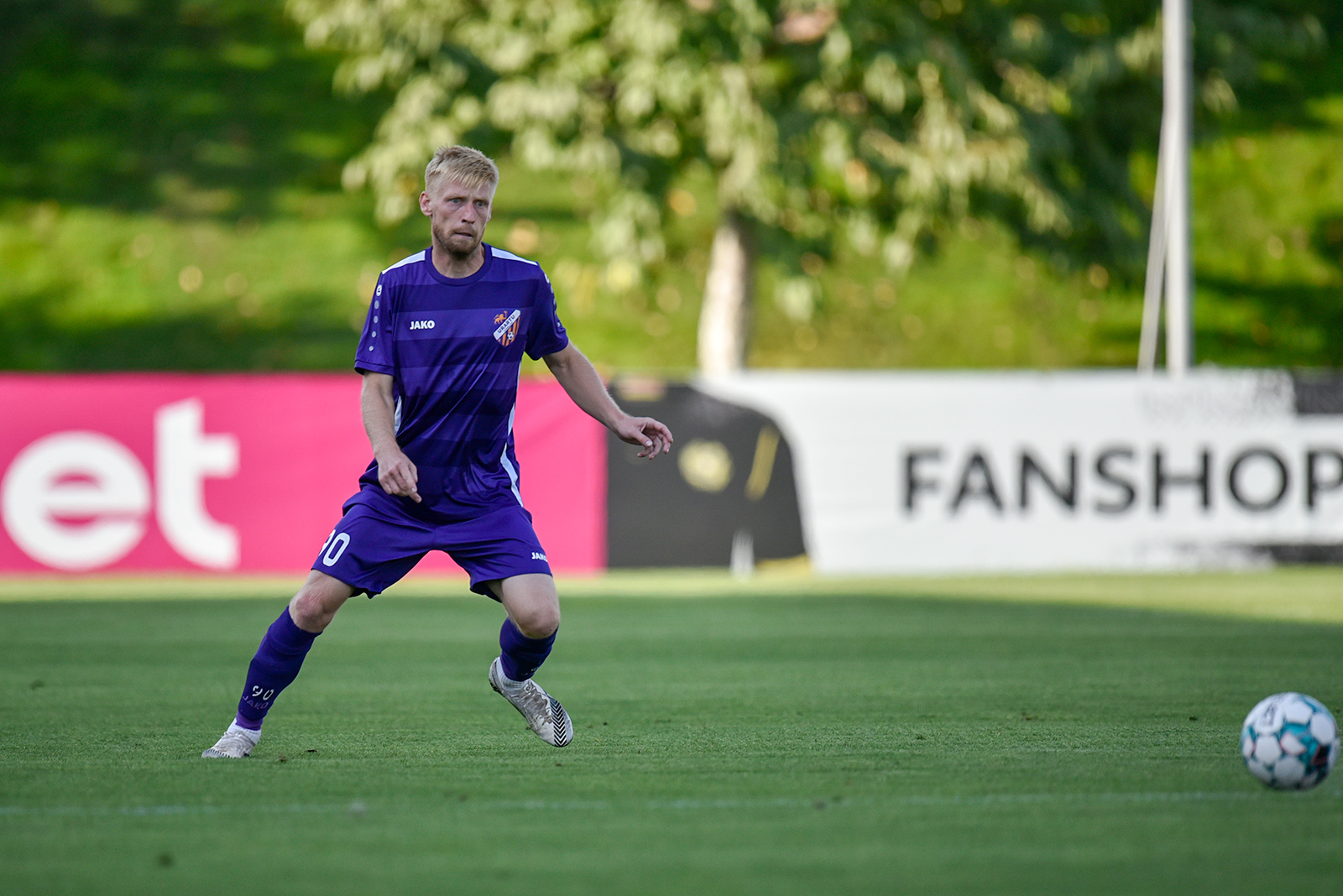

Personal information
- Full name: Oleg Valeryevich Polyakov
- Date of birth: 29 November 1990 (age 35)
- Place of birth: Kamyshin, Russian SFSR
- Height: 1.76 m (5 ft 9 in)
- Positions: Midfielder; forward

Senior career*
Years	Team	Apps	(Gls)
2009–2010	Energiya Volzhsky	62	(12)
2011	Sokol Saratov	27	(4)
2012	Dynamo Bryansk	7	(0)
2012–2013	Tyumen	28	(5)
2013–2014	Torpedo Moscow	7	(0)
2013–2014	→ Tyumen (loan)	7	(0)
2014–2015	Zenit-Izhevsk	24	(2)
2015–2016	KAMAZ	27	(2)
2016–2017	Zenit-Izhevsk	20	(5)
2017–2020	Armavir	92	(12)
2020–2026	Urartu	142	(15)
- * Club domestic league appearances and goals as of 17 August 2026

Oleg Valeryevich Polyakov (Russian: Олег Валерьевич Поляков; born 29 November 1990) is a Russian former professional football player who played as a Midfielder or Forward.

== Club career ==
Polyakov made his Russian Football National League debut for FC Dynamo Bryansk on 20 March 2012 in a game against FC Torpedo Moscow.

On 14 July 2020, Polyakov signed for Urartu. On 15 August 2026, Urartu announced that Polyakov had retired from football having scored 16 goals in 163 appearances for Urartu.

== Career statistics ==
=== Club ===
Appearances and goals by club, season and competition
Club	Season	League			National cup (Note: Includes Armenian Cup)		Continental		Other		Total	
Club	Season	Division	Apps	Goals	Apps	Goals	Apps	Goals	Apps	Goals	Apps	Goals
Urartu	2020–21	Armenian Premier League	17	2	3	0	—		—		20	2
Urartu	2021–22	Armenian Premier League	32	5	3	0	2 (Note: Appearances in the UEFA Europa Conference League)	0	—		37	5
Urartu	2022–23	Armenian Premier League	31	4	3	0	—		—		34	4
Urartu	2023–24	Armenian Premier League	27	1	0	0	2 (Note: One appearances in the UEFA Champions League, one appearances in the UEFA Europa Conference League)	0	1 (Note: Appearances in the Armenian Supercup)	0	30	1
Urartu	2024–25	Armenian Premier League	17	1	1	0	1	0	—		19	1
Urartu	2025–26	Armenian Premier League	18	2	4	1	1	0	—		23	3
Urartu	Total		142	15	14	1	6	0	1	0	163	16
Career total			142	15	14	1	6	0	1	0	163	16

== Honours ==
Urartu

- Armenian Premier League: 2022–23
- Armenian Cup: 2022–23
