= Rafael Carioca (footballer, born 1992) =

Brazilian footballer

Personal information
- Full name: Rafael Bruno Cajueiro da Silva
- Date of birth: 18 July 1992 (age 34)
- Place of birth: Rio de Janeiro, Brazil
- Height: 1.75 m (5 ft 9 in)
- Position: Left back

Team information
- Current team: Floresta

Youth career
- 2009–2011: Vila Nova

Senior career*
Years	Team	Apps	(Gls)
2011–2012	Vila Nova	25	(2)
2013–2010	Internacional	2	(0)
2013	→ Resende (loan)	3	(0)
2013	→ Caxias (loan)	6	(0)
2014–2015	Caxias	44	(0)
2015–2016	Paraná	58	(2)
2017	Linense	0	(0)
2017–2018	Ceará	44	(4)
2018	CRB	18	(1)
2019	Red Bull Brasil	10	(0)
2019	Red Bull Bragantino	17	(0)
2020–2021	Vitória	27	(2)
2021	Botafogo	7	(0)
2022	Inter de Limeira	12	(0)
2022	América de Natal	11	(0)
2023	Urartu	9	(0)
2023–	Floresta	5	(0)
- * Club domestic league appearances and goals as of 20 August 2023

Rafael Bruno Cajueiro da Silva (born 18 July 1992), known as Rafael Carioca, is a Brazilian footballer who plays for Floresta.

== Career ==
=== Vitória ===
On 10 December 2019 Vitória announced the signing of Rafael for the 2020 season.

=== Urartu ===
On 25 January 2023, Armenian Premier League club Urartu announced the signing of Carioca. On 27 June 2023, Urartu announced that Carioca had left the club by mutual termination of his contract.

== Career statistics ==
As of 10 May 2019

Club	Season	League			State League		Cup		Continental		Other		Total	
Club	Season	Division	Apps	Goals	Apps	Goals	Apps	Goals	Apps	Goals	Apps	Goals	Apps	Goals
Vila Nova	2011	Série B	1	0	1	0	—		—		—		2	0
Vila Nova	2012	Série C	10	2	15	0	—		—		—		25	2
Vila Nova	Subtotal		11	2	16	0	—		—		—		27	2
Internacional	2013	Série A	—		2	0	—		—		—		2	0
Resende	2013	Série D	—		1	0	2	0	—		—		3	0
Caxias	2013	Série C	6	0	—		—		—		—		6	0
Caxias	2014	Série C	13	0	15	0	—		—		—		28	0
Caxias	2015	Série C	—		13	0	2	0	—		—		15	0
Caxias	Subtotal		19	0	28	0	2	0	—		—		49	0
Paraná	2015	Série B	27	2	—		—		—		—		27	2
Paraná	2016	Série B	21	0	6	0	4	0	—		—		31	0
Paraná	Subtotal		48	2	6	0	4	0	—		—		58	2
Ceará	2017	Série B	17	3	4	0	—		—		—		21	3
Ceará	2018	Série A	5	0	6	0	4	1	—		4 (Note: All appearance(s) in Copa do Nordeste)	0	19	1
Ceará	Subtotal		22	3	10	0	4	1	—		4	0	40	4
CRB	2018	Série B	18	1	—		—		—		—		18	1
Red Bull Brasil	2019	Paulista	—		10	0	—		—		—		10	0
Red Bull Bragantino	2019	Série B	3	0	—		—		—		—		3	0
Career total			121	8	73	0	12	1	0	0	4	0	210	9
