= Periša Pešukić =

Montenegrin association footballer

Personal information
- Date of birth: 7 December 1997 (age 28)
- Place of birth: Podgorica, Montenegro, FR Yugoslavia
- Height: 1.80 m (5 ft 11 in)
- Position: Right-back

Team information
- Current team: Arsenal Tivat
- Number: 2

Youth career
- Zeta

Senior career*
Years	Team	Apps	(Gls)
2014–2017	Zeta	47	(0)
2016–2017	→ Bratstvo Cijevna (loan)	19	(2)
2018–2019	Rudar Pljevlja	17	(0)
2019	Budućnost	16	(0)
2019–2021	Partizan	1	(0)
2020	→ Budućnost (loan)	11	(0)
2021	→ Novi Pazar (loan)	16	(1)
2022	Iskra Danilovgrad	14	(0)
2022–2023	Novi Pazar	31	(0)
2023–2024	Urartu	17	(1)
2024–2025	Arsenal Tivat	25	(0)

International career^{‡}
2018	Montenegro U21	4	(0)
- * Club domestic league appearances and goals as of 2 April 2025 ‡ National team caps and goals as of 18 August 2019

Periša Pešukić (Serbian Cyrillic: Периша Пешукић; born 7 December 1997) is a Montenegrin professional footballer who plays as a right-back for Arsenal Tivat.

== Club career ==
On 28 December 2018, Pešukić joined Budućnost. After only six months at Budućnost, he officially joined Serbian club Partizan on 14 June 2019. On 18 August 2019, he made his league debut for Partizan under coach Savo Milošević in a 3–0 victory against Rad. However, Pešukić did not play another competitive match for the rest of the year. He was then loaned back to Budućnost in time to participate in the team's winter training camp.

== International career ==
In 2018, Pešukić debuted for the Montenegrin national U21 team and has been capped a total of four times.

== Honours ==
Budućnost

- Montenegrin Cup: 2018–19
