= Leon Sabua =

Russian footballer

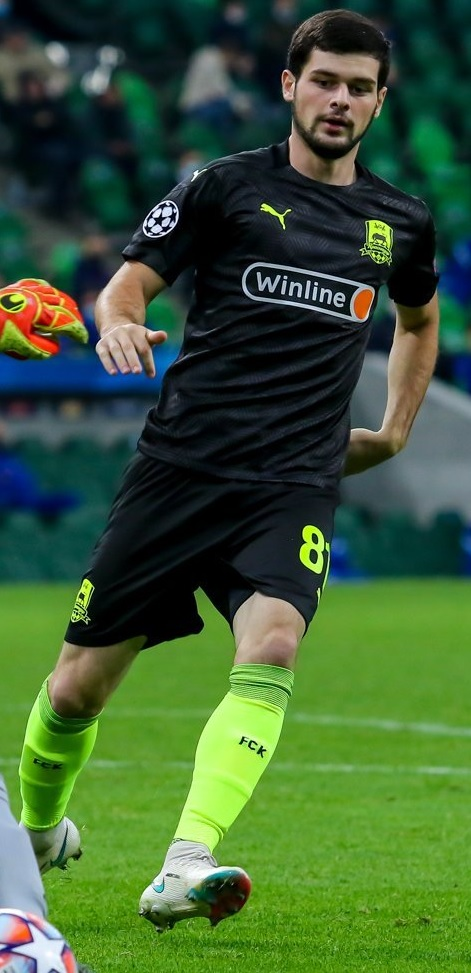
- Sabua with FC Krasnodar in 2020

Personal information
- Full name: Leon Rustamovich Sabua
- Date of birth: 1 September 2000 (age 26)
- Place of birth: Gagra, Abkhazia, Georgia
- Height: 1.83 m (6 ft 0 in)
- Positions: Centre forward; attacking midfielder

Youth career
- 2016–2019: Krasnodar

Senior career*
Years	Team	Apps	(Gls)
2018–2022	Krasnodar-2	93	(12)
2018–2021	Krasnodar-3	15	(4)
2019–2022	Krasnodar	3	(1)
2022–2025	Urartu	45	(9)
2026	FC Gagra	10	(10)
- * Club domestic league appearances and goals as of 6 July 2026

Leon Rustamovich Sabua (Abkhaz: Леон Русҭам-иҧа Сабуа; Russian: Леон Рустамович Сабуа; born 1 September 2000) is a Russian professional footballer who plays as a centre forward, most recently for Apsny Super League club FC Gagra[ru].

== Club career ==
Sabua made his debut in the Russian Professional Football League for FC Krasnodar-2 on 10 March 2018 in a game against FC Chayka Peschanokopskoye. He made his Russian Football National League debut for Krasnodar-2 on 18 August 2018 in a game against FC Luch Vladivostok.

Sabua made his Russian Premier League debut for FC Krasnodar on 24 October 2020 in a game against FC Spartak Moscow. He substituted Magomed-Shapi Suleymanov in the 57 minute and scored a goal 2 minutes later to make the score 1–2. The game ended in a 1–3 home loss. Four days later he made his European debut as a late substitute in the Champions League 0–4 home loss to Chelsea.

On 4 July 2022, Armenian Premier League club FC Urartu announced the signing of Sabua. On 3 January 2025, Urartu announced that Sabua had left the club after his contract was terminated by mutual agreement.

Since March 2026, he signed for Apsny Super League Club FC Gagra[ru], winning the Abkhazian Super Cup in his first game for the club.

== Career statistics ==
=== Club ===
As of match played 6 July 2026

Appearances and goals by club, season and competition
Club	Season	League			Cup		Europe		Other		Total	
Club	Season	Division	Apps	Goals	Apps	Goals	Apps	Goals	Apps	Goals	Apps	Goals
Krasnodar-2	2017–18	PFL	10	1	—		—		3 (Note: Appearances in the FNL Cup)	0	13	1
Krasnodar-2	2018–19	FNL	10	0	—		—		5	2	15	2
Krasnodar-2	2019–20	FNL	18	3	—		—		—		18	3
Krasnodar-2	2020–21	FNL	36	7	—		—		—		36	7
Krasnodar-2	2021–22	FNL	19	1	—		—		—		19	1
Krasnodar-2	Total		93	12	0	0	0	0	8	2	101	14
Krasnodar-3	2018–19	PFL	14	4	—		—		—		14	4
Krasnodar-3	2020–21	PFL	1	0	—		—		—		1	0
Krasnodar-3	Total		15	4	0	0	0	0	0	0	15	4
Krasnodar	2019–20	RPL	0	0	0	0	—		—		0	0
Krasnodar	2020–21	RPL	2	1	0	0	2 (Note: Appearances in UEFA Champions League)	0	—		4	1
Krasnodar	2021–22	RPL	1	0	0	0	—		—		1	0
Krasnodar	Total		3	1	0	0	2	0	0	0	5	1
Urartu	2022–23	Armenian Premier League	22	7	1	0	—		—		23	7
Urartu	2023–24	Armenian Premier League	14	2	2	0	3 (Note: 2 appearances in the UEFA Champions League, 1 appearance and 1 goal in the UEFA Europa Conference League.)	1	1 (Note: Appearances in the Armenian Supercup)	0	20	3
Urartu	2024–25	Armenian Premier League	9	0	1	1	0	0	—		10	1
Urartu	Total		45	9	4	1	3	1	1	0	53	11
FC Gagra[ru]	2026	Apsny Super League	9	10	1	0	__					
Career total			165	36	5	1	5	1	9	2	174	30

== Honours ==
=== Club ===
Urartu

- Armenian Premier League: 2022–23
- Armenian Cup: 2022–23

FC Gagra[ru]

- Abkhazian Super Cup: 2026
