= Aleksandr Melikhov =

Russian footballer

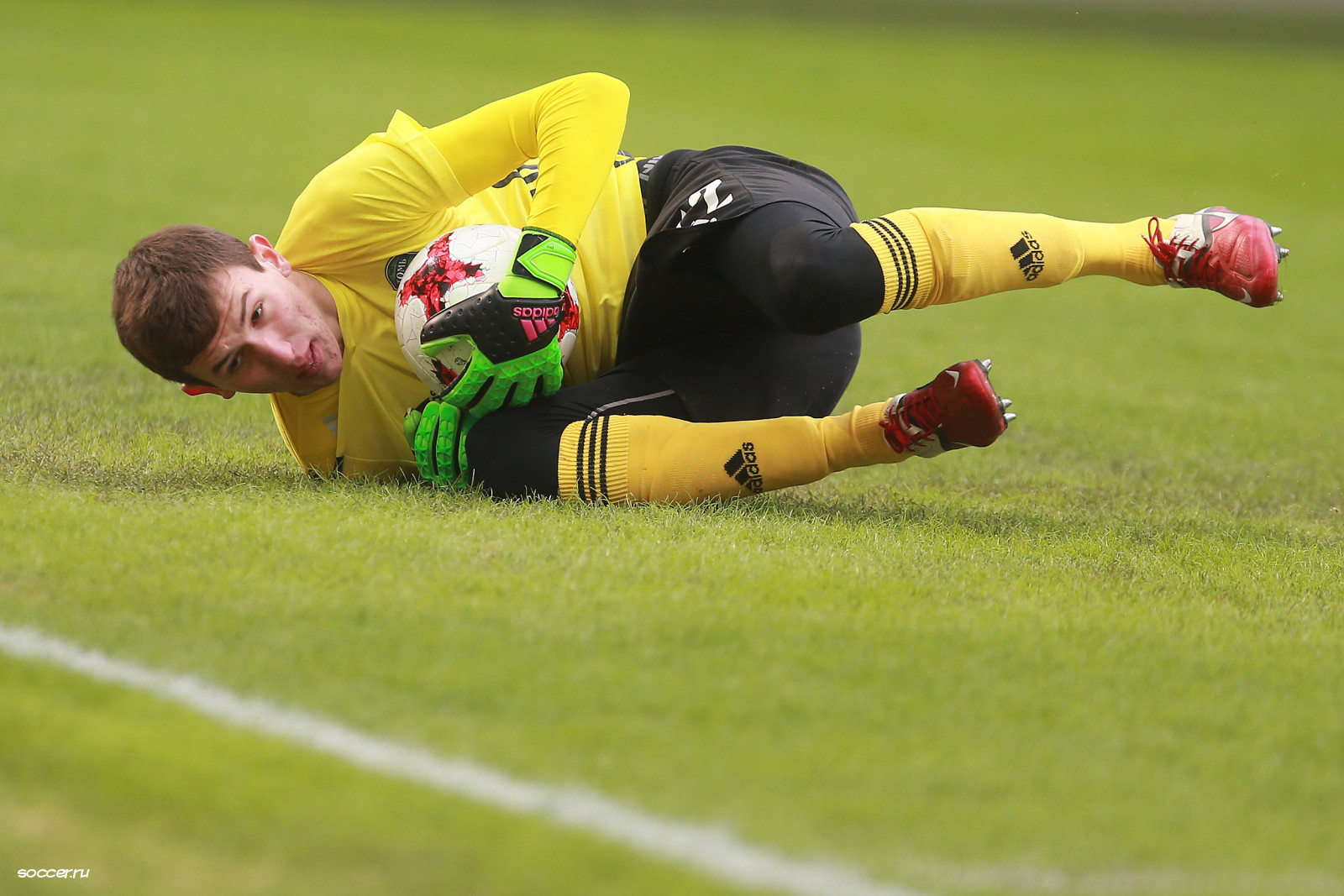
- Melikhov with Tom Tomsk in 2017

Personal information
- Full name: Aleksandr Andreyevich Melikhov
- Date of birth: 23 March 1998 (age 28)
- Place of birth: Novokuznetsk, Russia
- Height: 1.90 m (6 ft 3 in)
- Position: Goalkeeper

Team information
- Current team: Arsenal Tula
- Number: 42

Senior career*
Years	Team	Apps	(Gls)
2014–2015	Novokuznetsk	2	(0)
2016–2019	Tom Tomsk	46	(0)
2019–2022	Akhmat Grozny	2	(0)
2022–2025	Urartu	71	(0)
2025–	Arsenal Tula	6	(0)
2025–	Arsenal-2 Tula	1	(0)

International career^{‡}
2018	Russia U-21	2	(0)
- * Club domestic league appearances and goals as of 16 May 2026 ‡ National team caps and goals as of 11 September 2018

Aleksandr Andreyevich Melikhov (Russian: Александр Андреевич Мелихов; born 23 March 1998) is a Russian football player who plays for Arsenal Tula.

== Club career ==
He made his debut in the Russian Professional Football League for FC Novokuznetsk on 13 October 2015 in a game against FC Sibir-2 Novosibirsk.

He made his Russian Premier League debut for FC Tom Tomsk on 3 March 2017 in a game against FC Rostov in a 0–6 loss.

On 12 June 2019, he signed a 5-year contract with Russian Premier League club FC Akhmat Grozny.

On 3 August 2022, Melikhov joined Urartu. On 11 June 2025, Urartu announced that Melikhov had left the club after his contract had expired.

On 25 June 2025, Arsenal Tula officially announced the signing of a contract with Melikhov.

== Career statistics ==
As of match played 16 May 2026

Club	Season	League			Cup		Continental		Other		Total	
Club	Season	Division	Apps	Goals	Apps	Goals	Apps	Goals	Apps	Goals	Apps	Goals
Novokuznetsk	2015–16	Russian Second League	2	0	–		–		–		2	0
Tom Tomsk	2016–17	Russian Premier League	7	0	0	0	–		–		7	0
Tom Tomsk	2017–18	Russian First League	24	0	1	0	–		–		25	0
Tom Tomsk	2018–19	Russian First League	15	0	0	0	0	0	–		15	0
Tom Tomsk	Total		46	0	1	0	0	0	0	0	47	0
Akhmat Grozny	2019–20	Russian Premier League	1	0	0	0	–		–		1	0
Akhmat Grozny	2020–21	Russian Premier League	0	0	1	0	–		–		1	0
Akhmat Grozny	2021–22	Russian Premier League	1	0	2	0	–		–		3	0
Akhmat Grozny	Total		2	0	3	0	0	0	0	0	5	0
Urartu	2022–23	Armenian Premier League	22	0	2	0	–		–		24	0
Urartu	2023–24	Armenian Premier League	26	0	3	0	4 (Note: Two appearances and zero goals in the UEFA Champions League, and two appearances and zero goals in the UEFA Conference League.)	0	1 (Note: Appearances in the Armenian Supercup)	0	34	0
Urartu	2024–25	Armenian Premier League	23	0	1	0	0 (Note: Appearances in the UEFA Conference League)	0	–		24	0
Urartu	Total		71	0	6	0	4	0	1	0	82	0
Arsenal Tula	2025–26	Russian First League	6	0	2	0	–		–		8	0
Arsenal-2 Tula	2025	Russian Second League B	1	0	–		–		–		1	0
Career total			128	0	12	0	4	0	1	0	145	0

== Honours ==
=== Club ===
Urartu

- Armenian Premier League: 2022–23
- Armenian Cup: 2022–23
