= Nikolai Prudnikov =

Russian footballer

Personal information
- Full name: Nikolai Aleksandrovich Prudnikov
- Date of birth: 1 January 1998 (age 28)
- Place of birth: Shklow, Belarus
- Height: 1.71 m (5 ft 7 in)
- Position: Forward

Team information
- Current team: Asiagoal Bishkek
- Number: 10

Senior career*
Years	Team	Apps	(Gls)
2016–2017	Chertanovo Moscow	22	(15)
2017–2020	Zenit-2 St. Petersburg	51	(6)
2019–2020	→ Chertanovo Moscow (loan)	26	(2)
2020–2022	Orenburg	62	(13)
2023	Mezőkövesd	5	(0)
2023–2024	Urartu	23	(4)
2024	Volgar Astrakhan	9	(0)
2025	BATE Borisov	7	(0)
2026–	Asiagoal Bishkek	2	(0)

International career
2015	Russia U17	5	(0)
2015–2016	Russia U18	6	(0)
2016	Russia U19	3	(1)
- * Club domestic league appearances and goals as of 14 March 2026

Nikolai Aleksandrovich Prudnikov (Russian: Николай Александрович Прудников, born 1 January 1998) is a Russian football player who plays for Kyrgyz Premier League club Asiagoal Bishkek.

== Club career ==
He made his debut in the Russian Professional Football League for Chertanovo Moscow on 10 April 2016 in a game against Zenit Penza and scored the only goal of the game, giving his team a 1–0 win.

He made his Russian Football National League debut for Zenit-2 St. Petersburg on 8 July 2017 in a game against Shinnik Yaroslavl.

On 11 February 2019, he returned to Chertanovo Moscow on loan until the end of the 2018–19 season.

On 4 January 2023, Prudnikov signed with Mezőkövesd in Hungary. On 17 August 2023, he left the club by mutual agreement.

On 26 August 2023, he joined the Armenian club Urartu.

== International ==
He represented Russia national under-17 football team at the 2015 FIFA U-17 World Cup.

== Honours ==
- Russian Professional Football League Zone Center top scorer: 2016–17.
