= Karen Melkonyan =

Armenian footballer (born 1999)

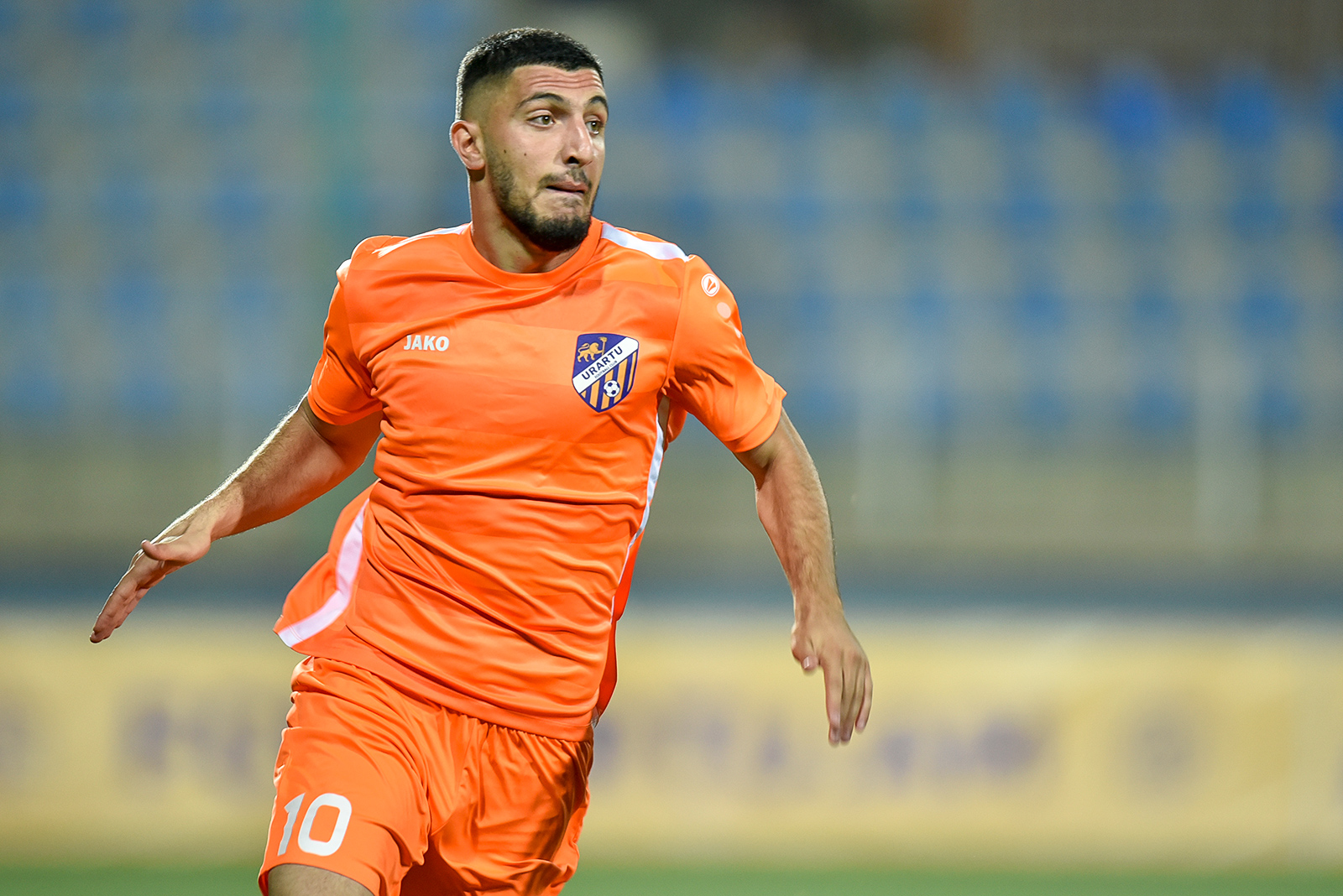
- Melkonyan with Urartu in 2022

Personal information
- Date of birth: 25 March 1999 (age 27)
- Place of birth: Yerevan, Armenia
- Height: 1.80 m (5 ft 11 in)
- Position: Midfielder

Team information
- Current team: Urartu
- Number: 10

Youth career
- Urartu

Senior career*
Years	Team	Apps	(Gls)
2017–2019	Urartu-2	27	(10)
2017–	Urartu	185	(28)

International career
2015–2016	Armenia U17	9	(1)
2016–2017	Armenia U19	18	(3)
2018–2020	Armenia U21	12	(1)
2021	Armenia	1	(0)
- * Club domestic league appearances and goals as of 18 June 2026

Karen Melkonyan (Armenian: Կարեն Մելքոնյան; born 25 March 1999) is an Armenian professional footballer who plays as a midfielder for Armenian Premier League club Urartu.

== Club career ==
A youth academy graduate of Urartu, Melkonyan made his senior team debut on 4 March 2017 in a 2–1 league defeat against Alashkert. On 13 May 2023, he scored his team's winning goal in the 2023 Armenian Cup final.

== International career ==
Melkonyan is a former Armenia youth international. On 24 May 2021, he received his first call-up to the senior team for friendly matches against Croatia and Sweden. He made his debut on 1 June in a 1–1 draw against Croatia.

== Career statistics ==
=== International ===
As of 1 June 2021

Appearances and goals by national team and year
National team	Year	Apps	Goals
Armenia	2021	1	0
Total		1	0

== Honours ==
Urartu

- Armenian Premier League: 2022–23
- Armenian Cup: 2022–23

Individual

- Armenian Premier League Player of the Month: May 2025
