= Narek Agasaryan =

Armenian footballer

Personal information
- Date of birth: 15 July 2001 (age 25)
- Place of birth: Pyatigorsk, Russia
- Height: 1.74 m (5 ft 9 in)
- Position: Defensive midfielder

Team information
- Current team: Urartu
- Number: 8

Youth career
- –2018: Banants

Senior career*
Years	Team	Apps	(Gls)
2018–2021	Banants III	13	(1)
2019–2021	→ BKMA Yerevan (loan)	52	(8)
2021–	Urartu	139	(5)

International career^{‡}
2017	Armenia U17	3	(0)
2019	Armenia U18	2	(0)
2019	Armenia U19	7	(1)
2020–2022	Armenia U21	12	(0)
2025–	Armenia	3	(0)
- * Club domestic league appearances and goals as of 18 June 2026 ‡ National team caps and goals as of 16 November 2025

Narek Agasaryan (Armenian: Նարեկ Աղասարյան; Russian: Нарек Агасарян; born 15 July 2001) is a football player who plays as a defensive midfielder for Armenian Premier League club Urartu. Born in Russia, he represents the Armenia national team.

== Club career ==
Agasaryan is a graduate of the Urartu Football Academy (previously Banants).

On 21 June 2021, Agasaryan returned to Urartu, after having spent the previous two seasons on loan at BKMA Yerevan.

On 23 October 2024, Agasaryan played his 100th match in the Armenian Premier League.

== International career ==
On 9 November 2023, he received his first call-up to the Armenian senior national team for a UEFA Euro 2024 qualifying matches against Wales and Croatia respectively. Unfortunately, he was replaced by Wbeymar Angulo in the national team's roster due to injury.

Agasaryan made his debut for the Armenia national team on 6 September 2025 in a 2026 FIFA World Cup qualifying match against Portugal, coming off the bench.

== Career statistics ==
=== International ===
As of 16 November 2025

Armenia
Year	Apps	Goals
2025	3	0
Total	3	0

== Honours ==
Urartu

- Armenian Premier League: 2022–23
- Armenian Cup : 2022–23
