= Erik Piloyan =

Armenian footballer (born 2001)

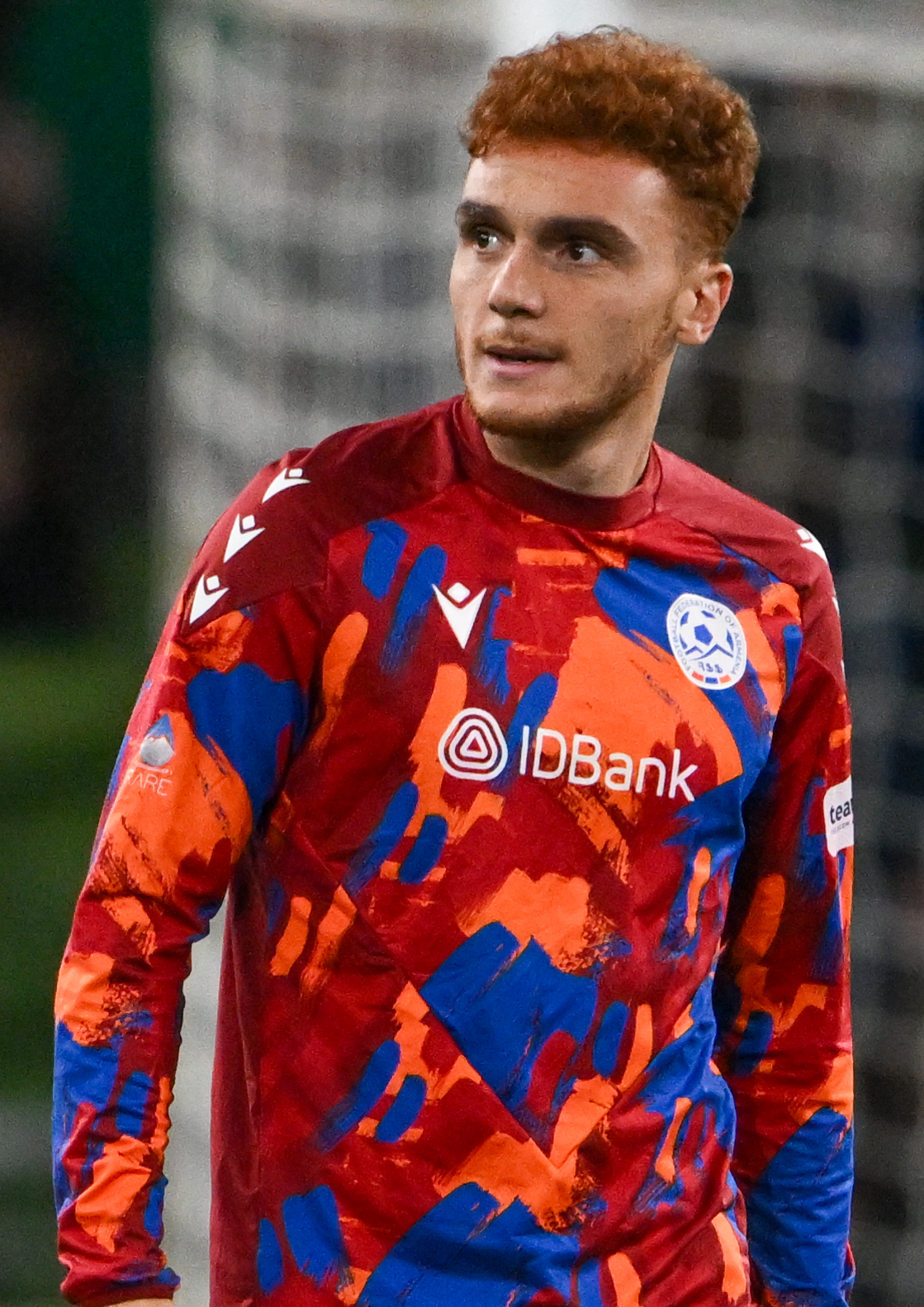
- Piloyan with Armenia in 2025

Personal information
- Date of birth: 29 January 2001 (age 25)
- Place of birth: Yerevan, Armenia
- Height: 1.82 m (6 ft 0 in)
- Positions: Centre-back; right-back

Team information
- Current team: Urartu
- Number: 3

Youth career
- Urartu

Senior career*
Years	Team	Apps	(Gls)
2019–2022	Urartu-2	35	(1)
2020–	Urartu	93	(5)
2021–2022	→ BKMA Yerevan (loan)	6	(0)

International career^{‡}
2017	Armenia U17	3	(0)
2019	Armenia U18	4	(0)
2021	Armenia U21	2	(0)
2023–	Armenia	15	(0)
- * Club domestic league appearances and goals as of 18 June 2026 ‡ National team caps and goals as of 15 November 2026 (UTC)

Erik Piloyan (Armenian: Էրիկ Փիլոյան; born 29 January 2001) is an Armenian professional footballer who plays as a centre-back for Armenian Premier League club Urartu and the Armenia national team.

== Club ==
Piloyan is a FC Urartu academy product who started his career as part of the backup team of Urartu, in the first league of Armenia, combining this with rare appearances in the first team.

In July 2021, it was announced that Piloyan went on a one-year loan to BKMA, the newcomer club of the Armenian Premier League for the 2021–22 season, but already in January 2022, it was announced that he would return to his native club.

After returning from BKMA, he continued to play for both the main and reserve teams of Urartu.

== International ==
He was called up to the Armenia U17 and Armenia U21.

On March 17, 2023, he received his first call-up to the Armenian senior national team for a UEFA Euro 2024 qualifying match against Turkey and a friendly match against Cyprus, respectively.

Piloyan debuted for the senior Armenia national football team in a friendly 2–2 draw with Cyprus on 28 March 2023, he played the full game.

== Career statistics ==
=== International ===
As of match played 15 November 2026

Appearances and goals by national team and year
National team	Year	Apps	Goals
Armenia	2023	2	0
Armenia	2025	6	0
Armenia	2026	7	0
Total		15	0

== Honours ==
=== Club ===
Urartu

- Armenian Premier League: 2022–23
- Armenian Cup: 2022–23
