= Temur Dzhikiya =

Russian footballer

Personal information
- Full name: Temur Tengizovich Dzhikiya
- Date of birth: 8 May 1998 (age 28)
- Place of birth: Moscow, Russia
- Height: 1.86 m (6 ft 1 in)
- Position: Forward

Team information
- Current team: Amkal Moscow
- Number: 89

Youth career
- –2015: FShM Moscow
- 2016: Yunost Moscow Spartak-2

Senior career*
Years	Team	Apps	(Gls)
2017	Domodedovo Moscow	3	(0)
2018–2019	Khimki	1	(0)
2018–2019	→ Khimki-M	21	(4)
2019	Ararat Moscow	14	(1)
2020	Zorkiy Krasnogorsk	0	(0)
2020	Kolomna	13	(7)
2021	Volga Ulyanovsk	12	(9)
2021–2022	Veles Moscow	12	(1)
2022–2024	Volga Ulyanovsk	14	(0)
2023–2024	→ Urartu (loan)	37	(14)
2024	→ BATE Borisov (loan)	14	(3)
2025	Pyunik	9	(1)
2025–	Amkal Moscow (amateur)		
- * Club domestic league appearances and goals as of 28 July 2025

Temur Tengizovich Dzhikiya (Russian: Темур Тенгизович Джикия; born 8 May 1998) is a Russian football player. He plays for amateur club Amkal Moscow.

== Club career ==
He made his debut in the Russian Professional Football League for Domodedovo Moscow on 9 April 2017 in a game against Spartak Kostroma.

Dzhikiya made his Russian Football National League debut for Khimki on 24 November 2018 in a game against Spartak-2 Moscow.

On 26 January 2025, Pyunik announced the signing of Dzhikiya from Volga Ulyanovsk. On 4 June 2025, Pyunik announced the departure of Dzhikiya.
