= 2024–25 FC Alashkert season =

Alashkert
2024–25 season
- Chairman: Bagrat Navoyan
- Manager: Abraham Khashmanyan (until 22 January); Edgar Torosyan (Caretaker) (22 January-18 April); Albert Safaryan (from 19 April)
- Stadium: Alashkert Stadium
- Premier League: 9th
- Armenian Cup: Second round
- Top goalscorer: League: Sargis Metoyan (8); All: Sargis Metoyan (8)
Home colours	Away colours

The 2024–25 season was Alashkert's thirteenth season in the Armenian Premier League and eighteenth overall.

== Season overview ==
On 1 August, Alashkert announced their squad for the 2024–25 season, which included the signings of goalkeepers, Yuri Martirosyan, Gor Manukyan, Valerio Vimercati, defenders, Artur Kartashyan, Armen Manucharyan, Arman Khachatryan, Vaspurak Minasyan, Alen Poghosyan, Vazha Patsatsia, midfielders, Rumyan Hovsepyan, Vahagn Hayrapetyan, Benik Hovhannisyan, Haggai Katoh, Jefferson, Murilo Rosa, Narek Hovhannisyan and forwards José Embaló, Aleksandar Glišić, Zakaria Sanogo, Sargis Metoyan, Armen Hovhannisyan and Bladimir Díaz.

On 15 August, Alashkert announced the signing of Clinton Bangura from Milsami Orhei.

On 22 August, Alashkert announced the signing of free-agent Hayk Musakhanyan.

On 13 September, Alashkert announced the signing of Petros Avetisyan from Khimki.

On 20 January, Alashkert announced the return Annan Mensah from Lernayin Artsakh. The following day, Alashkert announced the singing of Michael Ayvazyan from Ararat Yerevan.

On 1 February, Alashkert announced the singing of Mario-Jason Kikonda from Besa Kavajë, and Christos Kountouriotis from Telavi.

The following day, 2 February, Alashkert announced the singing of Yevgeniy Guletskiy from Vitebsk.

On 18 February, Alashkert announced the singing of Robert Potinyan from Kompozit Pavlovsky Posad and Artyom Arkhipov and Pavel Kireyenko from Turan.

On 25 February, Alashkert announced the singing of Gevorg Tarakhchyan, who'd previously played for Urartu.

On 19 April, Alashkert announced that Yevgeniy Guletskiy had left the club by mutual agreement.

On 12 May, Alashkert announced that Mario-Jason Kikonda had left the club by mutual agreement.

== Squad ==
As of match played 27 May 2025

Number	Name	Nationality	Position	Date of birth (age)	Signed from	Signed in	Contract ends	Apps.	Goals
Goalkeepers
1	Vlad Chatunts	(Armenia)	GK	19 September 2002 (aged 22)	Pyunik	2023		1	0
22	Gor Manukyan	(Armenia)	GK	27 September 1993 (aged 31)	West Armenia	2024		10	0
71	Valerio Vimercati	(Italy)	GK	4 March 1995 (aged 30)	Noah	2024		19	0
Defenders
2	Yuri Martirosyan	(Armenia)	DF	29 June 1994 (aged 30)	West Armenia	2024		28	0
4	Armen Manucharyan	(Armenia)	DF	3 February 1995 (aged 30)	Van	2024		25	1
15	Arman Khachatryan	(Armenia)	DF	9 June 1997 (aged 27)	West Armenia	2024		27	0
16	Arsen Galstyan	(Armenia)	DF	1 May 2002 (aged 23)	Ararat Yerevan	2024		4	0
19	Hayk Musakhanyan	(France)	DF	20 March 1998 (aged 27)	Unattached	2024		12	0
21	Arman Ghazaryan	(Armenia)	DF	24 June 2001 (aged 23)	on loan from Urartu	2025	2025	8	0
27	Annan Mensah	(Ghana)	DF	6 July 1996 (aged 28)	Lernayin Artsakh	2025		76	6
33	Alen Poghosyan	(Armenia)	DF	4 September 2003 (aged 21)	Noah	2024		7	0
Midfielders
5	Rumyan Hovsepyan	(Armenia)	MF	13 November 1991 (aged 33)	Unattached	2024		91	2
7	Robert Potinyan	(Armenia)	MF	1 January 2004 (aged 21)	Kompozit Pavlovsky Posad	2025		7	0
9	Benik Hovhannisyan	(Armenia)	MF	1 May 1993 (aged 32)	Van	2024		45	1
20	Narek Manukyan	(Armenia)	MF	19 December 2003 (aged 21)	Kaluga	2022		9	0
23	Petros Avetisyan	(Armenia)	MF	7 January 1996 (aged 29)	Khimki	2024		25	2
70	Haggai Katoh	(Nigeria)	MF	3 April 2003 (aged 22)	Noah	2024		27	1
	Michael Ayvazyan	(Armenia)	MF	2 September 2004 (aged 20)	Ararat Yerevan	2025		0	0
Forwards
10	Gevorg Tarakhchyan	(Armenia)	FW	15 March 2002 (aged 23)	Unattached	2025		12	0
11	Aleksandar Glišić	(Bosnia and Herzegovina)	FW	3 September 1992 (aged 32)	Unattached	2024		92	22
17	Artyom Arkhipov	(Russia)	FW	15 December 1996 (aged 28)	Turan	2025		4	0
55	Sargis Metoyan	(Armenia)	FW	6 September 1997 (aged 27)	West Armenia	2024		33	8
77	Christos Kountouriotis	(Greece)	FW	2 January 1998 (aged 27)	Telavi	2025		10	0
88	Armen Hovhannisyan	(Armenia)	FW	7 March 2000 (aged 25)	Mosta	2024		18	0
95	Pavel Kireyenko	(Russia)	FW	14 June 1994 (aged 30)	Turan	2025		13	1
Away on loan
3	Artur Kartashyan	(Armenia)	DF	8 January 1997 (aged 28)	Telavi	2024		2	0
Left during the season
7	Vahagn Hayrapetyan	(Armenia)	MF	14 June 1997 (aged 27)	Syunik	2024		38	1
8	Clinton Bangura	(Austria)	DF	22 March 1998 (aged 27)	Milsami Orhei	2024		7	0
8	Mario-Jason Kikonda	(France)	MF	20 April 1996 (aged 29)	Besa Kavajë	2025		5	0
10	José Embaló	(Guinea-Bissau)	FW	3 May 1993 (aged 32)	Dalian Yingbo	2024		55	14
17	Zakaria Sanogo	(Burkina Faso)	FW	11 December 1996 (aged 28)	Rahimo	2024		9	0
21	Vaspurak Minasyan	(Armenia)	DF	29 June 1994 (aged 30)	Noah	2024		7	0
27	Vadym Paramonov	(Ukraine)	DF	18 March 1991 (aged 34)	Unattached	2024		8	0
77	Jefferson	(Brazil)	MF	8 November 1995 (aged 29)	Andraus Brasil	2024		1	0
94	Vazha Patsatsia	(Georgia (country))	DF	29 January 1998 (aged 27)	Liepāja	2024		10	0
94	Yevgeniy Guletskiy	(Belarus)	DF	15 January 2001 (aged 24)	Vitebsk	2025		2	0
95	Bladimir Díaz	(Colombia)	FW	10 July 1992 (aged 32)	Sheikh Jamal DC	2024		27	12
98	Murilo Rosa	(Brazil)	MF	25 November 1995 (aged 29)	Paredes	2024		11	0
99	Narek Hovhannisyan	(Armenia)	MF	11 June 2002 (aged 22)	Van	2024		6	0

== Transfers ==
=== In ===
Date	Position	Nationality	Name	From	Fee	Ref.
1 August 2024	GK	(Armenia)	Gor Manukyan	West Armenia	Undisclosed	
1 August 2024	GK	(Italy)	Valerio Vimercati	Noah	Undisclosed	
1 August 2024	DF	(Armenia)	Artur Kartashyan	Telavi	Undisclosed	
1 August 2024	DF	(Armenia)	Arman Khachatryan	West Armenia	Undisclosed	
1 August 2024	DF	(Armenia)	Armen Manucharyan	Van	Undisclosed	
1 August 2024	DF	(Armenia)	Yuri Martirosyan	West Armenia	Undisclosed	
1 August 2024	DF	(Armenia)	Vaspurak Minasyan	Noah	Undisclosed	
1 August 2024	DF	(Armenia)	Alen Poghosyan	Noah	Undisclosed	
1 August 2024	DF	(Georgia (country))	Vazha Patsatsia	Liepāja	Undisclosed	
1 August 2024	MF	(Armenia)	Vahagn Hayrapetyan	Syunik	Undisclosed	
1 August 2024	MF	(Armenia)	Benik Hovhannisyan	Van	Undisclosed	
1 August 2024	MF	(Armenia)	Narek Hovhannisyan	Van	Undisclosed	
1 August 2024	MF	(Armenia)	Rumyan Hovsepyan	Unattached	Free	
1 August 2024	MF	(Brazil)	Jefferson	Clube Andraus Brasil	Undisclosed	
1 August 2024	MF	(Brazil)	Murilo Rosa	Paredes	Undisclosed	
1 August 2024	MF	(Nigeria)	Haggai Katoh	Noah	Undisclosed	
1 August 2024	FW	(Armenia)	Armen Hovhannisyan	Mosta	Undisclosed	
1 August 2024	FW	(Armenia)	Sargis Metoyan	West Armenia	Undisclosed	
1 August 2024	FW	(Bosnia and Herzegovina)	Aleksandar Glišić	Unattached	Free	
1 August 2024	FW	(Burkina Faso)	Zakaria Sanogo	Rahimo	Undisclosed	
1 August 2024	FW	(Colombia)	Bladimir Díaz	Sheikh Jamal DC	Undisclosed	
1 August 2024	FW	(Guinea-Bissau)	José Embaló	Dalian Yingbo	Undisclosed	
15 August 2024	DF	(Austria)	Clinton Bangura	Milsami Orhei	Undisclosed	
22 August 2024	DF	(France)	Hayk Musakhanyan	Unattached	Free	
13 September 2024	MF	(Armenia)	Petros Avetisyan	Khimki	Undisclosed	
20 January 2025	DF	(Ghana)	Annan Mensah	Lernayin Artsakh	Undisclosed	
21 January 2025	MF	(Armenia)	Michael Ayvazyan	Ararat Yerevan	Undisclosed	
1 February 2025	MF	(France)	Mario-Jason Kikonda	Besa Kavajë	Undisclosed	
1 February 2025	FW	(Greece)	Christos Kountouriotis	Telavi	Undisclosed	
2 February 2025	DF	(Belarus)	Yevgeniy Guletskiy	Vitebsk	Undisclosed	
18 February 2025	MF	(Armenia)	Robert Potinyan	Kompozit Pavlovsky Posad	Undisclosed	
18 February 2025	FW	(Russia)	Artyom Arkhipov	Turan	Undisclosed	
18 February 2025	FW	(Russia)	Pavel Kireyenko	Turan	Undisclosed	
25 February 2025	FW	(Armenia)	Gevorg Tarakhchyan	Unattached	Free	

=== Loans in ===
Date from	Position	Nationality	Name	From	Date to	Ref.
27 February 2025	DF	(Armenia)	Arman Ghazaryan	Urartu	End of season	

=== Loans out ===
Date from	Position	Nationality	Name	To	Date to	Ref.
23 August 2024	DF	(Armenia)	Artur Kartashyan	Telavi	Undisclosed	

=== Released ===
Date	Position	Nationality	Name	Joined	Date	Ref
30 June 2024	GK	(Armenia)	Anatoly Ayvazov	West Armenia	5 August 2024	
30 June 2024	GK	(Russia)	Vsevolod Yermakov	Bars Issyk-Kul	26 February 2025	
30 June 2024	DF	(Armenia)	Serob Grigoryan	Van	5 July 2024	
30 June 2024	DF	(Armenia)	Taron Voskanyan	Pyunik	6 July 2024	
30 June 2024	DF	(Brazil)	Tiago Cametá	Amazonas	4 July 2024	
30 June 2024	DF	(Brazil)	William	Central SC	9 January 2025	
30 June 2024	DF	(Georgia (country))	Revaz Chiteishvili	Dinamo Batumi		
30 June 2024	DF	(Ghana)	Annan Mensah	Lernayin Artsakh		
30 June 2024	MF	(Armenia)	Yuri Gareginyan	Van		
30 June 2024	MF	(Armenia)	Karen Nalbandyan	Van	6 July 2024	
30 June 2024	MF	(Armenia)	Artak Yedigaryan	Gandzasar Kapan		
30 June 2024	MF	(Brazil)	Aram Kocharyan	West Armenia	7 August 2024	
30 June 2024	MF	(Guinea-Bissau)	Mimito Biai	Emirates Club		
30 June 2024	MF	(North Macedonia)	Stefan Ashkovski	Şanlıurfaspor		
30 June 2024	MF	(Nigeria)	Sodiq Fatai	Penafiel	28 August 2024	
30 June 2024	MF	(Russia)	David Khurtsidze	Gonio	3 March 2025	
30 June 2024	FW	(Brazil)	Gustavo Marmentini			
30 June 2024	FW	(Ecuador)	Yeison Racines	Delfín		
30 June 2024	FW	(Haiti)	Jonel Désiré	Telavi	16 July 2024	
30 June 2024	FW	(Russia)	Artur Sokhiyev	Broke Boys Moscow	18 October 2024	
1 November 2024	FW	(Burkina Faso)	Zakaria Sanogo	AS Douanes		
1 November 2024	DF	(Ukraine)	Vadym Paramonov			}
1 November 2024	FW	(Guinea-Bissau)	Murilo Rosa	EC Democrata	17 January 2025	
1 November 2024	FW	(Colombia)	Bladimir Díaz	Deportivo San Pedro	10 December 2024	
20 November 2024	DF	(Austria)	Clinton Bangura	Brera Strumica	20 November 2024	
31 December 2024	DF	(Georgia (country))	Vazha Patsatsia	Rustavi		
31 December 2024	MF	(Brazil)	Jefferson	River		
31 December 2024	FW	(Guinea-Bissau)	José Embaló	Vilaverdense		
4 February 2025	DF	(Armenia)	Vaspurak Minasyan	Gandzasar Kapan		
4 February 2025	MF	(Armenia)	Narek Hovhannisyan	Lernayin Artsakh		
4 February 2025	MF	(Armenia)	Vahagn Hayrapetyan	Gandzasar Kapan		
19 April 2025	DF	(Belarus)	Yevgeniy Guletskiy	Gandzasar Kapan		
12 May 2025	MF	(France)	Mario-Jason Kikonda	Saint-Colomban Locminé		

== Friendlies ==
22 March 2025	Ararat-Armenia	0–1	Alashkert	Yerevan
12:00 (UTC+4)		Report	Goal	Stadium: Yerevan Football Academy Stadium

== Competitions ==
=== Overview ===
Competition	First match	Last match	Starting round	Final position	Record							
Competition	First match	Last match	Starting round	Final position	Pld	W	D	L	GF	GA	GD	Win %
Premier League	3 August 2024	27 May 2025	Matchday 1	9th	30	6	8	16	24	52	−28	20.00
Armenian Cup	19 February 2025	19 February 2025	Second Round	Second Round	1	0	0	1	0	2	−2	0.00
Total					31	6	8	17	24	54	−30	19.35

Last updated: 27 May 2025
Source: Competitions

=== Premier League ===
==== Results summary ====
Overall								Home						Away					
Pld	W	D	L	GF	GA	GD	Pts	W	D	L	GF	GA	GD	W	D	L	GF	GA	GD
30	6	8	16	24	52	−28	26	4	5	6	16	25	−9	2	3	10	8	27	−19

Last updated: 27 May 2025.
Source: See Results

==== Results by round ====
Round	1	2	3	4	5	6	7	8	9	10	11	12	13	14	15	16	17	18	19	20	21	22	23	24	25	26	27	28	29	30	31	32	33
Ground	A	H	A	H	A	-	H	A	H	A	H	A	H	A	H	A	-	H	A	H	A	H	A	H	A	H	A	-	H	A	H	A	H
Result	L	D	W	L	L	P	D	D	L	L	L	W	W	L	L	L	P	D	L	L	D	L	L	D	D	D	L	P	W	L	W	L	W
Position	8	8	7	7	9	9	8	9	9	9	9	9	9	10	10	10	10	10	10	10	10	10	10	10	10	10	10	10	10	10	9	9	9

Updated to match(es) played on 27 May 2025. Source: See Results
A = Away; H = Home; W = Win; D = Draw; L = Loss; P = Bye

==== Results ====
3 August 2024 1	Ararat Yerevan	2–0	Alashkert	Yerevan
19:00 (UTC+4)	Hadji 45'; Goore 72'	Report	Vimercati (yellow card) 80'	Stadium: Republican Stadium; Referee: David Mkrtchyan

9 August 2024 2	Alashkert	1–1	Van	Abovyan
17:00 (UTC+4)	Kartashyan (yellow card) 33'; Embaló 69' (pen.); Khachatryan (yellow card) 82'	Report	Akila 8'	Stadium: City Stadium; Referee: Artak Vardanyan

18 August 2024 3	Pyunik	0–2	Alashkert	Yerevan
18:00 (UTC+4)		Report	Patsatsia 18' (yellow card) 39'; Bangura (yellow card) 46'; Embaló (yellow card) 55'; Katoh 77'; Manucharyan (yellow card) 90'	Stadium: Junior Sports Stadium; Referee: Vardan Vardumyan

24 August 2024 4	Alashkert	0–3	Urartu	Abovyan
19:00 (UTC+4)	B.Hovhannisyan (yellow card) 35'; Manucharyan (yellow card) 68'; Hovsepyan (yellow card) 71'	Report	Gilmore 44' (yellow card) 47'; Kravchuk (yellow card) 53'; Ignatyev 63'; Melkonyan (yellow card) 74'; Movsesyan 81'; Piloyan (yellow card) 85'	Stadium: City Stadium; Referee: Artem Gasparyan

30 August 2024 5	Ararat-Armenia	3–1	Alashkert	Yerevan
19:00 (UTC+4)	Yenne 4'; Noubissi 21'; Muradyan (yellow card) 65'; Serobyan (yellow card) 76'; Tera 80'	Report	B.Hovhannisyan 14' (pen.)	Stadium: Yerevan Football Academy Stadium; Referee: Yura Mahtesyan

6	Bye
(UTC+4)

18 September 2024 7	Alashkert	2–2	Gandzasar Kapan	Abovyan
17:00 (UTC+4)	Embaló 69'; A.Hovhannisyan (yellow card) 90'; Avetisyan 90+4' (pen.)	Report	Kocharyan 4'; Faye (yellow card) 32'; Opoku 61'; Shahinyan (yellow card) 88'; Dotsenko (yellow card) 90'; Stepanov (yellow card) 90+1'	Stadium: City Stadium; Referee: Ashot Ghaltakhchyan

23 September 2024 8	Shirak	0–0	Alashkert	Gyumri
19:00 (UTC+4)	Mkrtchyan (yellow card) 71'; Mkoyan (yellow card) 83'	Report	A.Hovhannisyan (yellow card) 17'; Hovsepyan (red card) 74'; Katoh (yellow card) 90+3'	Stadium: City Stadium; Referee: Sargis Khachatryan

28 September 2024 9	Alashkert	0–2	West Armenia	Abovyan
16:00 (UTC+4)	Murilo (yellow card) 18'; B.Hovhannisyan (yellow card) 90+3'; Khachatryan (yellow card) 90+4'	Report	Dramé (yellow card) 14'; Junior (yellow card) 21'; Granado (yellow card) 44'; Yusuf 69', 88'; Danielyan (yellow card) 90+3'	Stadium: City Stadium; Referee: Henrik Nalbandian

7 October 2024 10	BKMA Yerevan	1–0	Alashkert	Yerevan
17:00 (UTC+4)	Askaryan (yellow card) 23'; Ayvazyan (yellow card) 27'; Aghbalyan 58'; Eloyan (yellow card) 83'; Bashoyan (yellow card) 90+6'	Report	N.Manukyan (red card) 20'	Stadium: Yerevan Football Academy Stadium; Referee: Yura Mahtesyan

16 October 2024 11	Alashkert	0–6	Noah	Abovyan
18:00 (UTC+4)	Poghosyan (yellow card) 39'; Khachatryan (yellow card) 53'; Vimercati (yellow card) 89'	Report	Gregório 19' (pen.), 55'; Avanesyan (yellow card) 34'; Oulad Omar 41'; Çinari 45+3', 89'; Manvelyan (yellow card) 70'; Pedro 85'	Stadium: City Stadium; Referee: Henrik Nalbandian

23 October 2024 12	Gandzasar Kapan	0–1	Alashkert	Yerevan
16:00 (UTC+4)	Mani (yellow card) 60'	Report	Avetisyan 13' (pen.)	Stadium: Junior Sport Stadium; Referee: Ashot Ghaltakhchyan

27 October 2024 13	Alashkert	2–0	BKMA Yerevan	Abovyan
15:00 (UTC+4)	Metoyan 14', 50'; Hovsepyan (yellow card) 32'; Khachatryan (yellow card) 88'	Report		Stadium: City Stadium; Referee: Ashot Ghaltakhchyan

31 October 2024 14	West Armenia	2–0	Alashkert	Yerevan
16:00 (UTC+4)	Tarasenko 45+3' (pen.), 57' (yellow card) 83'; Rudoselsky (yellow card) 90+2'	Report	Musakhanyan (red card) 45+2'	Stadium: Junior Sport Stadium; Referee: Sargis Khachatryan

4 November 2024 15	Alashkert	1–3	Shirak	Abovyan
15:00 (UTC+4)	N.Manukyan 8'; Bangura (yellow card) 18'; Manucharyan (yellow card) 61'; Poghosyan (yellow card) 74'; Khachatryan (yellow card) 90+2'	Report	Doh 19', 80'; Vidić 49' (yellow card) 57'; Hakobyan (yellow card) 63'; Misakyan (yellow card) 90'; Traore (yellow card) 90+4'	Stadium: City Stadium; Referee: Zaven Hovhannisyan

10 November 2024 16	Noah	4–0	Alashkert	Abovyan
19:00 (UTC+4)	Pinson (yellow card) 23'; Hambardzumyan 40'; Oulad Omar 45+3'; Petrosyan 64'; Aiás 75'	Report	B.Hovhannisyan (red card) 13'; Vimercati (yellow card) 20'; Manucharyan (red card) 55'; Hovsepyan (yellow card) 55'	Stadium: City Stadium; Referee: David Mkrtchyan

17	Bye
(UTC+4)

27 November 2024 18	Alashkert	2–2	Ararat-Armenia	Abovyan
15:00 (UTC+4)	Metoyan 40', 86'; Katoh (yellow card) 41'	Report	Noubissi 53'; Yenne 89' (penalty missed) 90+	Stadium: City Stadium; Referee: Zaven Hovhannisyan

3 December 2024 19	Urartu	1–0	Alashkert	Yerevan
18:00 (UTC+4)	Ignatyev 90+6'	Report	A.Hovhannisyan (yellow card) 6'; B.Hovhannisyan (yellow card) 55'; Hovsepyan (yellow card) 89'	Stadium: Urartu Stadium; Referee: Artem Gasparyan

25 February 2025 20	Alashkert	0–2	Pyunik	Yerevan
14:00 (UTC+4)	Mensah (yellow card) 1'; Khachatryan (yellow card) 22'	Report	Udo (yellow card) 3'; Agdon 24'; Bopesu (yellow card) 88'; Vareika 90+6'	Stadium: Junior Sport Stadium; Referee: Ashot Harutyunyan

1 March 2025 21	Van	1–1	Alashkert	Charentsavan
15:00 (UTC+4)	Touré 8'; Bationo (yellow card) 67'; Nalbandyan (yellow card) 73'	Report	Manucharyan 63'; Vimercati (yellow card) 88'	Stadium: City Stadium; Referee: Vardan Manukyan

8 March 2025 22	Alashkert	0–1	Ararat Yerevan	Armavir
14:00 (UTC+4)	Musakhanyan (yellow card) 14'; Katoh (yellow card) 57'; Kireyenko (yellow card) 65'; Kikonda (yellow card) 77'; B.Hovhannisyan (yellow card) 90+2'	Report	Kante (yellow card) 14'; Boniface (yellow card) 33' (goal) 50' (pen.); Dombila (yellow card) 51'; Kante (yellow card) 60'; Marcelo (yellow card) 76'	Stadium: Armavir City Stadium; Referee: Artem Gasparyan

15 March 2025 23	Ararat-Armenia	3–0	Alashkert	Yerevan
16:00 (UTC+4)	Noubissi 33'; Bueno (yellow card) 37'; Yenne 40'; Muradyan (yellow card) 41'; Gbomadu 90+3'	Report	Katoh (yellow card) 66'; Mensah (yellow card) 88'	Stadium: Yerevan Football Academy Stadium; Referee: Ashot Harutyunyan

29 March 2025 24	Alashkert	2–2	Van	Charentsavan
16:00 (UTC+4)	Khachatryan (yellow card) 45'; Metoyan 83'; Mensah 89'	Report	Touré (yellow card) 26'; Okonkwo 43' (yellow card) 81'; Bationo (yellow card) 56'; Odeyinka 80'	Stadium: City Stadium; Referee: Zaven Hovhannisyan

5 April 2025 25	Pyunik	1–1	Alashkert	Abovyan
16:00 (UTC+4)	Vareika 23'; Bopesu (yellow card) 53'; Kovalenko (yellow card) 89'	Report	Metoyan 28'; Manucharyan (yellow card) 55'; Kireyenko (yellow card) 64'; Kikonda (yellow card) 85'	Stadium: City Stadium; Referee: Yura Mahtesyan

11 April 2025 26	Alashkert	1–1	Urartu	Abovyan
16:00 (UTC+4)	Kireyenko (yellow card) 63'; Tikhy 68' (o.g.); Manucharyan (yellow card) 75' (yellow-red card) 84'	Report	Santos (yellow card) 64'; Gunko (yellow card) 82'; Mirzoyan 85'	Stadium: City Stadium; Referee: Sargis Khachatryan

18 April 2025 27	Ararat Yerevan	3–2	Alashkert	Yerevan
16:00 (UTC+4)	Boniface 2'; Bah 58', 70'	Report	Martirosyan 26'; Metoyan 33'; A.Hovhannisyan (yellow card) 75'	Stadium: Republican Stadium; Referee: Zaven Hovhannisyan

28	Bye
(UTC+4)

2 May 2025 29	Alashkert	1–0	Gandzasar Kapan	Abovyan
16:00 (UTC+4)	Martirosyan (yellow card) 58'; Kireyenko 68'; Hovsepyan (yellow card) 84'; Avetisyan (yellow card) 89'	Report	Sawada (yellow card) 90+5'	Stadium: City Stadium; Referee: Artem Gasparyan

10 May 2025 30	Shirak	4–0	Alashkert	Gyumri
18:30 (UTC+4)	Misakyan 16', 60'; Mryan 45+3', 77'; Vidić (yellow card) 47'; Mkrtchyan (yellow card) 70'	Report	B.Hovhannisyan (yellow card) 50'; Kikonda (yellow card) 53'; Kireyenko (yellow card) 85'	Stadium: City Stadium; Referee: Vardan Manukyan

16 May 2025 31	Alashkert	3–0	West Armenia	Abovyan
16:00 (UTC+4)				Stadium: City Stadium
Note: The match was awarded as a 3-0 technical defeat in favour of Alashkert on 15 May when West Armenia where disqualified from the league.

22 May 2025 32	BKMA Yerevan	2–0	Alashkert	Yerevan
19:00 (UTC+4)	Eloyan 29'; Ha.Sargsyan (yellow card) 59'; A.Khachatryan 76'; K.Hovhannisyan (yellow card) 88'	Report	Tarakhchyan (yellow card) 33'; Hovsepyan (yellow card) 45+2'; Martirosyan (yellow card) 68'; Ghazaryan (yellow card) 83'	Stadium: Yerevan Football Academy Stadium; Referee: Artem Gasparyan

27 May 2025 33	Alashkert	1–0	Noah	Armavir
16:00 (UTC+4)	Metoyan 20'	Report	James (yellow card) 63'; Petrosyan (yellow card) 68'; Khudaverdyan (yellow card) 87'; Coneglian (yellow card) 60'; Gevorgyan (yellow card) 90+7'	Stadium: Armavir City Stadium; Referee: Tiran Yeritsyan

==== League table ====
Pos	Team	Pld	W	D	L	GF	GA	GD	Pts	Qualification or relegation
1	Noah (C)	30	24	3	3	92	20	+72	75	Qualification for the Champions League first qualifying round
2	Ararat-Armenia	30	21	3	6	75	28	+47	66	Qualification for the Conference League second qualifying round (Note: The 2024–25 Armenian Cup winners qualified for the Conference League second qualifying round. Since the cup winners (Noah) qualified based on league position, the Conference League second round spot was passed to the second-placed team, and the second Conference League first round spot was passed to the fourth-placed team.)
3	Urartu	30	19	5	6	64	31	+33	62	Qualification for the Conference League first qualifying round
4	Pyunik	30	17	2	11	59	37	+22	53	Qualification for the Conference League first qualifying round
5	Van	30	15	7	8	56	36	+20	52	
6	BKMA	30	10	6	14	44	54	−10	36	
7	Shirak	30	10	5	15	30	50	−20	35	
8	Ararat Yerevan	30	9	5	16	36	59	−23	32	
9	Alashkert	30	6	8	16	24	52	−28	26	
10	Gandzasar Kapan	30	2	4	24	16	73	−57	10	
11	West Armenia (Note: On 7 May 2025, it was announced that West Armenia were on the verge of expulsion after a no show against Ararat-Armenia. On 17 May 2025, they were officially expelled and all games were awarded 3–0 to their opponents.) (D, R)	30	7	2	21	22	78	−56	23	Relegation to the Armenian First League

Source: FFA
Rules for classification: 1) Points; 2) Head-to-head points; 3) Head-to-head goal difference; 4) Head-to-head goals scored; 5) Matches won; 6) Goal difference; 7) Less red cards; 8) Less yellow cards ; 9) Fair-play ranking 10) Draw
(C) Champions; (D) Disqualified; (R) Relegated

=== Armenian Cup ===
19 February 2025 Second round	Noah	2–0	Alashkert	Yerevan
16:00 (UTC+4)	Çinari (yellow card) 32'; Gregório 40'; Manvelyan 50'; Silva (yellow card) 74'	Report	Manucharyan (yellow card) 36'; Hovsepyan (yellow card) 64'; Avetisyan (yellow card) 81'; A.Hovhannisyan (yellow card) 86'	Stadium: Junior Sport Stadium; Referee: Vardan Manukyan

== Squad statistics ==
As of match played 27 May 2025

=== Appearances and goals ===
No.	Pos	Nat	Player	Total		Premier League		Armenian Cup	
No.	Pos	Nat	Player	Apps	Goals	Apps	Goals	Apps	Goals
1	GK	(Armenia) ARM	Vlad Chatunts	1	0	1	0	0	0
2	DF	(Armenia) ARM	Yuri Martirosyan	28	1	26+1	1	1	0
4	DF	(Armenia) ARM	Armen Manucharyan	25	1	24	1	1	0
5	MF	(Armenia) ARM	Rumyan Hovsepyan	26	0	22+3	0	1	0
7	MF	(Armenia) ARM	Robert Potinyan	7	0	0+7	0	0	0
9	MF	(Armenia) ARM	Benik Hovhannisyan	23	1	16+6	1	1	0
10	FW	(Armenia) ARM	Gevorg Tarakhchyan	12	0	9+3	0	0	0
11	FW	(Bosnia and Herzegovina) BIH	Aleksandar Glišić	19	0	5+13	0	0+1	0
15	DF	(Armenia) ARM	Arman Khachatryan	25	0	23+1	0	1	0
16	DF	(Armenia) ARM	Arsen Galstyan	4	0	4	0	0	0
17	FW	(Russia) RUS	Artyom Arkhipov	4	0	1+2	0	0+1	0
19	DF	(France) FRA	Hayk Musakhanyan	12	0	10+2	0	0	0
20	MF	(Armenia) ARM	Narek Manukyan	8	1	5+3	1	0	0
21	DF	(Armenia) ARM	Arman Ghazaryan	8	0	5+3	0	0	0
22	GK	(Armenia) ARM	Gor Manukyan	10	0	10	0	0	0
23	MF	(Armenia) ARM	Petros Avetisyan	25	2	16+8	2	0+1	0
27	DF	(Ghana) GHA	Annan Mensah	13	1	10+2	1	1	0
33	DF	(Armenia) ARM	Alen Poghosyan	7	0	5+2	0	0	0
55	FW	(Armenia) ARM	Sargis Metoyan	29	8	23+5	8	1	0
70	MF	(Nigeria) NGA	Haggai Katoh	27	1	21+5	1	1	0
71	GK	(Italy) ITA	Valerio Vimercati	19	0	18	0	1	0
77	FW	(Greece) GRE	Christos Kountouriotis	10	0	4+5	0	1	0
88	FW	(Armenia) ARM	Armen Hovhannisyan	18	0	9+8	0	0+1	0
95	FW	(Russia) RUS	Pavel Kireyenko	13	1	12	1	0+1	0
Players away on loan:
3	DF	(Armenia) ARM	Artur Kartashyan	2	0	1+1	0	0	0
Players who left Ararat-Armenia during the season:
7	MF	(Armenia) ARM	Vahagn Hayrapetyan	10	0	5+5	0	0	0
8	DF	(Austria) AUT	Clinton Bangura	7	0	6+1	0	0	0
8	MF	(France) FRA	Mario-Jason Kikonda	5	0	1+4	0	0	0
10	FW	(Guinea-Bissau) GNB	José Embaló	12	2	7+5	2	0	0
17	FW	(Burkina Faso) BFA	Zakaria Sanogo	9	0	3+6	0	0	0
21	DF	(Armenia) ARM	Vaspurak Minasyan	7	0	3+4	0	0	0
27	DF	(Ukraine) UKR	Vadym Paramonov	4	0	4	0	0	0
77	MF	(Brazil) BRA	Jefferson	1	0	1	0	0	0
94	DF	(Georgia (country)) GEO	Vazha Patsatsia	10	1	4+6	1	0	0
94	DF	(Belarus) BLR	Yevgeniy Guletskiy	2	0	1	0	1	0
95	FW	(Colombia) COL	Bladimir Díaz	5	0	0+5	0	0	0
98	MF	(Brazil) BRA	Murilo Rosa	11	0	4+7	0	0	0
99	MF	(Armenia) ARM	Narek Hovhannisyan	6	0	0+6	0	0	0

=== Goal scorers ===
Place	Position	Nation	Number	Name	Premier League	Armenian Cup	Total
1	FW	(Armenia)	55	Sargis Metoyan	8	0	8
2	FW	(Guinea-Bissau)	10	José Embaló	2	0	2
2	MF	(Armenia)	23	Petros Avetisyan	2	0	2
4	DF	(Georgia (country))	94	Vazha Patsatsia	1	0	1
4	MF	(Nigeria)	70	Haggai Katoh	1	0	1
4	MF	(Armenia)	9	Benik Hovhannisyan	1	0	1
4	MF	(Armenia)	20	Narek Manukyan	1	0	1
4	DF	(Armenia)	4	Armen Manucharyan	1	0	1
4	DF	(Ghana)	27	Annan Mensah	1	0	1
4	DF	(Armenia)	2	Yuri Martirosyan	1	0	1
4	FW	(Russia)	95	Pavel Kireyenko	1	0	1
4				Own goal	1	0	1
				Awarded	3	0	3
				TOTALS	24	0	24

=== Clean sheets ===
Place	Position	Nation	Number	Name	Premier League	Armenian Cup	Total
1	GK	(Armenia)	22	Gor Manukyan	3	0	3
1	GK	(Italy)	71	Valerio Vimercati	3	0	3
				TOTALS	6	0	6

=== Disciplinary record ===
Number	Nation	Position	Name	Premier League		Armenian Cup		Total	
Number	Nation	Position	Name	Booked	Sent off (straight red)	Booked	Sent off (straight red)	Booked	Sent off (straight red)
2	(Armenia)	DF	Yuri Martirosyan	2	0	0	0	2	0
4	(Armenia)	DF	Armen Manucharyan	6	2	1	0	7	2
5	(Armenia)	MF	Rumyan Hovsepyan	6	1	1	0	7	1
9	(Armenia)	MF	Benik Hovhannisyan	5	1	0	0	5	1
10	(Armenia)	FW	Gevorg Tarakhchyan	1	0	0	0	1	0
15	(Armenia)	DF	Arman Khachatryan	7	0	0	0	7	0
19	(France)	DF	Hayk Musakhanyan	1	1	0	0	1	1
20	(Armenia)	MF	Narek Manukyan	0	1	0	0	0	1
21	(Armenia)	DF	Arman Ghazaryan	1	0	0	0	1	0
23	(Armenia)	MF	Petros Avetisyan	1	0	1	0	2	0
27	(Ghana)	DF	Annan Mensah	2	0	0	0	2	0
33	(Armenia)	DF	Alen Poghosyan	2	0	0	0	2	0
70	(Nigeria)	MF	Haggai Katoh	4	0	0	0	4	0
71	(Italy)	GK	Valerio Vimercati	4	0	0	0	4	0
88	(Armenia)	FW	Armen Hovhannisyan	4	0	1	0	5	0
95	(Russia)	FW	Pavel Kireyenko	4	0	0	0	4	0
Players away on loan:
3	(Armenia)	DF	Artur Kartashyan	1	0	0	0	1	0
Players who left Ararat-Armenia during the season:
8	(Austria)	DF	Clinton Bangura	2	0	0	0	2	0
8	(France)	MF	Mario-Jason Kikonda	3	0	0	0	3	0
10	(Guinea-Bissau)	FW	José Embaló	1	0	0	0	1	0
94	(Georgia (country))	DF	Vazha Patsatsia	1	0	0	0	1	0
98	(Brazil)	MF	Murilo Rosa	1	0	0	0	1	0
			TOTALS	59	6	4	0	63	6
