= 2022 Armenian Cup final =

- Event: 2021–22 Armenian Cup
Noravank	Urartu
2	0
- Date: 8 May 2022
- Venue: Republican Stadium, Yerevan
- Referee: Zaven Hovhannisyan (Yerevan)

The 2022 Armenian Cup final was the 31st Armenian Cup Final, and the final match of the 2021–22 Armenian Cup. It was played at the Republican Stadium in Yerevan, Armenia, on 8 May 2022, contested by Noravank and Urartu. This was Noravank's first appearance in the Final of the Armenian Cup and Urartu's ninth appearance, with Noravank winning 2–0 to win their first title, however the club folded prior to the start of the next season after not obtaining an UEFA license and where replaced in the UEFA Europa Conference League by the fourth placed league team, Ararat Yerevan.

== Match ==
=== Details ===
8 May 2022
19:00 AMT

Noravank	2–0	Urartu
Mustafin 28' (yellow card) 88'; A.Avagyan (yellow card) 45+2'; Yenne 77'	Report

Republican Stadium, Yerevan
Referee: Zaven Hovhannisyan (Yerevan)

Noravank	Urartu

GK	1	(Armenia) Henri Avagyan
DF	4	(Russia) Mikhail Bashilov
DF	21	(Armenia) Artur Avagyan	(yellow card) 1'
DF	22	(Kazakhstan) Timur Rudoselsky
DF	25	(Brazil) Ebert		(substituted off) 60'
DF	63	(Russia) Temur Mustafin	(yellow card) 88'
MF	18	(The Gambia) Babou Cham
MF	88	(Armenia) Aram Kocharyan		(substituted off) 74'
FW	9	(Russia) Yevgeni Kobzar	(yellow card) 6'	(substituted off) 74'
FW	15	(Nigeria) Tenton Yenne
FW	17	(Nigeria) Shuaibu Ibrahim		(substituted off) 85'
Substitutes:
GK	12	(Russia) Daniil Yarusov
GK	31	(Armenia) Daniil Yarusov
DF	5	(Armenia) Simon Obonde		(substituted in) 60'
MF	6	(Nigeria) Moses Candidus		(substituted in) 85'
MF	7	(Armenia) Andranik Kocharyan
MF	8	(Nigeria) Julius Ufuoma		(substituted in) 74'
MF	10	(Armenia) Karen Nalbandyan		(substituted in) 74'
DF	11	(Russia) Arman Asilyan
DF	20	(Ghana) Simon Obonde
FW	37	(Russia) Sergei Orlov
MF	77	(Armenia) Davit Minasyan
DF	99	(Armenia) Arman Mkrtchyan
Manager:
(Armenia) Vahe Gevorgyan

GK	24	(Armenia) Arsen Beglaryan
DF	2	(Ghana) Nana Antwi		(substituted off) 68'
DF	6	(Armenia) Arman Ghazaryan
DF	14	(Russia) Pyotr Ten
DF	67	(Ukraine) Vadym Paramonov	(yellow card) 74'	(substituted off) 81'
DF	88	(Armenia) Zhirayr Margaryan
MF	8	(Nigeria) Ugochukwu Iwu
MF	9	(Armenia) Narek Aghasaryan		(substituted off) 81'
MF	19	(Armenia) Sergey Mkrtchyan		(substituted off) 85'
FW	12	(Haiti) Jonel Désiré
FW	22	(Armenia) Artur Miranyan
Substitutes:
GK	96	(Armenia) Anatoly Ayvazov
DF	4	(Armenia) Armen Manucharyan
DF	15	(Ghana) Annan Mensah
DF	18	(Rwanda) Salomon Nirisarike
DF	36	(Armenia) Khariton Ayvazyan		(substituted in) 68'
MF	17	(Armenia) Tigran Ayunts
MF	20	(Armenia) Gor Lulukyan
MF	23	(Armenia) Erik Vardanyan		(substituted in) 81'
MF	90	(Russia) Oleg Polyakov		(substituted in) 81'
FW	7	(Armenia) Samvel Hakobyan
FW	10	(Armenia) Karen Melkonyan		(substituted in) 85'
FW	13	(Ukraine) Dmytro Khlyobas
Manager:
(Armenia) Robert Arzumanyan

Man of the Match:

Assistant referees:
Mesrop Ghazaryan (Yerevan)
Gevorg Shakhkaldyan (Yerevan)
Fourth official:
Shahen Aghayan (Yerevan)

Match rules

- 90 minutes
- 30 minutes of extra time if necessary
- Penalty shoot-out if scores still level
- Twelve named substitutes
- Maximum of five substitutions, with a sixth allowed in extra time
