= Narek Grigoryan =

Armenian footballer (born 2001)

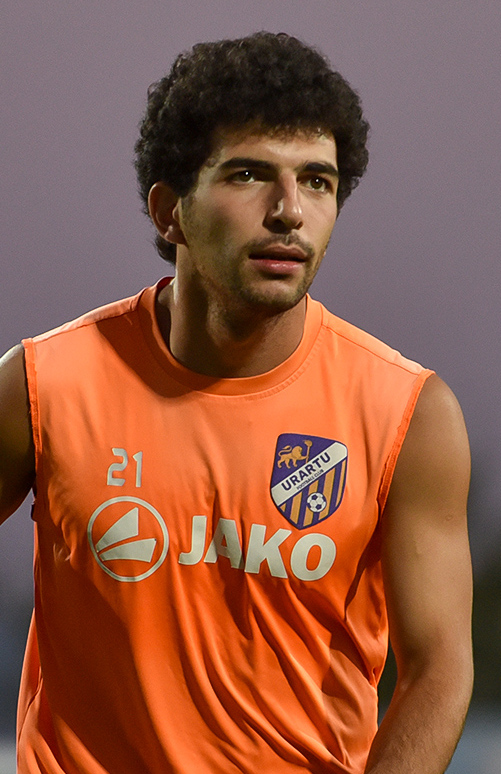
- Grigoryan with Urartu in 2022

Personal information
- Full name: Narek Grigoryan
- Date of birth: 17 June 2001 (age 25)
- Place of birth: Yerevan, Armenia
- Height: 1.80 m (5 ft 11 in)
- Position: Winger

Team information
- Current team: Farul Constanța
- Number: 30

Youth career
- –2018: Banants

Senior career*
Years	Team	Apps	(Gls)
2018–2023	Urartu	61	(13)
2018–2019	Banants-2	26	(3)
2019–2021	→ BKMA Yerevan (loan)	55	(21)
2022	→ Jagiellonia Białystok (loan)	3	(0)
2023–	Farul Constanța	96	(9)

International career^{‡}
2016–2017	Armenia U17	7	(2)
2018–2019	Armenia U18	11	(1)
2018–2019	Armenia U19	23	(3)
2020–2022	Armenia U21	11	(2)
2021–	Armenia	15	(0)
- * Club domestic league appearances and goals as of 7 November 2026 ‡ National team caps and goals as of 15 November 2026

Narek Grigoryan (Armenian: Նարեկ Գրիգորյան; born 17 June 2001) is an Armenian professional footballer who plays as a winger for Liga I club Farul Constanța and the Armenia national team.

== Club career ==
On 1 March 2022, he went on loan until the end of the 2022–23 season to Jagiellonia Białystok.

On 30 August 2023 he finally moved from his home club Urartu to the Romanian side Farul Constanța.

== International career ==
He represented Armenia at the 2019 UEFA European Under-19 Championship.

He made his debut for Armenia national team on 11 November 2021 in a World Cup qualifier against North Macedonia.

== Career statistics ==
=== Club ===
As of match played 7 November 2026

Appearances and goals by club, season and competition
Club	Season	League			National cup (Note: Includes Armenian Cup, Cupa României)		Europe		Other		Total	
Club	Season	Division	Apps	Goals	Apps	Goals	Apps	Goals	Apps	Goals	Apps	Goals
Urartu	2017–18	Armenian Premier League	5	0	1	0	—		—		6	1
Urartu	2018–19	Armenian First League	2	0	0	0	0	0	—		2	0
Urartu	2019–20	Armenian First League	—		—		0	0	—		0	0
Urartu	2021–22	Armenian First League	18	4	1	0	2 (Note: Appearances in UEFA Conference League)	0	—		21	4
Urartu	2022–23	Armenian First League	32	8	3	1	—		—		35	9
Urartu	2023–24	Armenian First League	4	1	—		4 (Note: Two appearances and two goals in UEFA Champions League, two goals appearances in UEFA Conference League and two goals)	2	—		8	3
Urartu	Total		61	13	5	1	6	2	—		72	16
Banants-2	2017–18	Armenian First League	11	3	—		—		—		11	3
Banants-2	2018–19	Armenian First League	15	0	—		—		—		15	0
Banants-2	Total		26	3	—		—		—		26	3
BKMA Yerevan (loan)	2019–20	Armenian First League	26	10	—		—		—		26	10
BKMA Yerevan (loan)	2020–21	Armenian First League	29	11	4	0	—		—		33	1
BKMA Yerevan (loan)	Total		55	21	4	0	—		—		59	21
Jagiellonia Białystok (loan)	2021–22	Ekstraklasa	3	0	—		—		—		3	0
Farul Constanța	2023–24	Liga I	19	0	1	0	0	0	—		20	0
Farul Constanța	2024–25	Liga I	38	7	2	1	—		—		40	8
Farul Constanța	2025–26	Liga I	33	2	1	0	—		2 (Note: Appearances in Liga I promotion/relegation play-offs)	0	36	2
Farul Constanța	2026–27	Liga I	6	0	0	0	—		—		6	0
Farul Constanța	Total		96	9	4	1	0	0	2	0	102	10
Career total			241	46	13	2	6	2	2	0	262	50

=== International ===
As of match played 15 November 2026

Appearances and goals by national team and year
National team	Year	Apps	Goals
Armenia	2021	2	0
Armenia	2022	2	0
Armenia	2024	2	0
Armenia	2025	5	0
Armenia	2026	4	0
Total		15	0

== Honours ==
Urartu

- Armenian Premier League: 2022–23
- Armenian Cup: 2022–23
