= 2025 Armenian Cup final =

- Event: 2024–25 Armenian Cup
Noah	Ararat-Armenia
3	1
- Date: 13 May 2024
- Venue: Republican Stadium, Yerevan
- Referee: Ashot Harutyunyan

The 2025 Armenian Cup final was the 34th Armenian Cup Final, and the final match of the 2024–25 Armenian Cup. It was played at the Republican Stadium in Yerevan, Armenia, on 13 May 2025, and contested by Ararat-Armenia and Noah.

== Match ==
=== Details ===
12 May 2024
19:00 AMT

Noah	3–1	Ararat-Armenia
Ferreira 40', 57'; Aiás 87'	Report	Noubissi 44'

Republican Stadium, Yerevan
Referee: Ashot Harutyunyan

Noah	Ararat-Armenia

GK	22	(Armenia) Ognjen Čančarević	(yellow card) 90+4'
DF	3	(Armenia) Sergey Muradyan
DF	4	(Iceland) Guðmundur Þórarinsson
DF	19	(Armenia) Hovhannes Hambardzumyan		(substituted off) 81'
DF	37	(Portugal) Gonçalo Silva
MF	17	(Burkina Faso) Gustavo Sangaré
MF	21	(Portugal) Bruno Almeida		(substituted off) 71'
MF	81	(Netherlands) Imran Oulad Omar		(substituted off) 71'
MF	88	(Cameroon) Yan Eteki	(yellow card) 88'	(substituted off) 86'
FW	7	(Portugal) Hélder Ferreira
FW	93	(France) Virgile Pinson	(yellow card) 37'	(substituted off) 81'
Substitutes:
GK	92	(Russia) Aleksey Ploshchadny
FW	9	(Brazil) Matheus Aiás		(substituted in) 71'
MF	10	(Armenia) Artak Dashyan
FW	11	(Albania) Eraldo Çinari		(substituted in) 71'
FW	18	(Armenia) Artyom Avanesyan
MF	20	(Slovakia) Martin Gamboš
FW	24	(Armenia) Zaven Khudaverdyan
DF	26	(Serbia) Aleksandar Miljković		(substituted in) 81'
FW	30	(Armenia) Grenik Petrosyan		(substituted in) 81'
DF	40	(Armenia) Hovhannes Gevorgyan
DF	44	(Bosnia and Herzegovina) Nermin Zolotić		(substituted in) 86'
MF	50	(Armenia) Gagik Meloyan
Manager:
(Portugal) Rui Mota

GK	96	(Armenia) Henri Avagyan
DF	3	(Colombia) Junior Bueno	(yellow card) 37' (yellow-red card) 90+6'
DF	4	(Portugal) João Queirós
DF	13	(Armenia) Kamo Hovhannisyan
DF	16	(Armenia) Edgar Grigoryan		(substituted off) 86'
MF	11	(Colombia) Jonathan Duarte		(substituted off) 67'
MF	19	(Armenia) Karen Muradyan		(substituted off) 75'
MF	20	(Kenya) Alwyn Tera	(yellow card) 12'	(substituted off) 46'
FW	15	(Nigeria) Tenton Yenne
FW	33	(Ghana) Eric Ocansey
FW	45	(Cameroon) Marius Noubissi
Substitutes:
GK	1	(Armenia) Rafael Manasyan
GK	31	(Ukraine) Danylo Kucher
DF	5	(Armenia) Hakob Hakobyan
FW	7	(Armenia) Zhirayr Shaghoyan		(substituted in) 67'
MF	8	(Armenia) Hovhannes Harutyunyan		(substituted in) 75'
MF	10	(Russia) Armen Ambartsumyan		(substituted in) 46'
MF	12	(Kenya) Amos Nondi
FW	17	(Nigeria) Matthew Gbomadu		(substituted in) 86'
MF	21	(Armenia) Narek Alaverdyan
DF	34	(Brazil) Romércio
Manager:
(Armenia) Vardan Minasyan

Man of the Match:

Assistant referees:
Mesrop Ghazaryan
Artur Gdlyan
Fourth official:
Vardan Manukyan
VAR:
Zaven Hovhannisyan
VAR assistant:
Atom Sevgulyan

Match rules

- 90 minutes
- 30 minutes of extra time if necessary
- Penalty shoot-out if scores still level
- Twelve named substitutes
- Maximum of five substitutions, with a sixth allowed in extra time
