= Ayk Musakhanyan =

Belarusian footballer (born 1998)

Personal information
- Full name: Ayk Araikovich Musakhanyan
- Date of birth: 20 March 1998 (age 28)
- Place of birth: Minsk, Belarus
- Height: 1.89 m (6 ft 2 in)
- Positions: Centre-back; defensive midfielder

Team information
- Current team: BATE Borisov
- Number: 6

Youth career
- SR Colmar

Senior career*
Years	Team	Apps	(Gls)
2017–2021	Energetik-BGU Minsk	111	(13)
2022–2023	Noah	40	(0)
2023	Haka	8	(0)
2024–2025	Alashkert	12	(0)
2025–	BATE Borisov	22	(1)
- * Club domestic league appearances and goals as of 6 July 2026

Ayk Araikovich Musakhanyan (Belarusian: Айк Араікавіч Мусаханян; Russian: Айк Араикович Мусаханян; Armenian: Հայկ Մուսախանյան; born 20 March 1998) is a Belarusian professional footballer for BATE Borisov.

== Career ==
Born in Minsk to Armenian parents, Musakhanyan moved with his family to Strasbourg, France (city and area with a vast Armenian community) at the age of 6. After spending a few seasons at the youth squad of French side SR Colmar, he returned to Belarus in 2017.

On 24 January 2022, Noah announced the signing of Musakhanyan. On 25 June 2023, Noah announced the departure of Musakhanyan.

On 15 August 2023, Musakhanyan was announced as a new signing for FC Haka in Finland.

On 1 August 2025, Musakhanyan signed a contract with BATE Borisov.

== Career statistics ==
As of 6 July 2026

Appearances and goals by club, season and competition
Club	Season	League			National cup (Note: Includes Belarusian Cup and Armenian Cup)		Other		Total	
Club	Season	Division	Apps	Goals	Apps	Goals	Apps	Goals	Apps	Goals
Energetic-BGU Minsk	2017	Belarusian First League	9	2	0	0	—		9	2
Energetic-BGU Minsk	2018	Belarusian First League	27	4	2	0	—		29	4
Energetic-BGU Minsk	2019	Belarusian Premier League	24	3	2	0	—		26	3
Energetic-BGU Minsk	2020	Belarusian Premier League	24	3	1	1	—		25	4
Energetic-BGU Minsk	2021	Belarusian Premier League	27	1	2	0	—		29	1
Energetic-BGU Minsk	Total		111	13	7	1	0	0	118	14
Noah	2021–22	Armenian Premier League	15	0	0	0	—		15	0
Noah	2022–23	Armenian Premier League	25	0	2	0	—		27	0
Noah	Total		40	0	2	0	0	0	42	0
Haka	2023	Veikkausliiga	8	0	0	0	—		8	0
Alashkert	2024–25	Armenian Premier League	12	0	0	0	—		12	0
BATE Borisov	2025	Belarusian Premier League	14	1	0	0	—		14	1
BATE Borisov	2026	Belarusian Premier League	8	0	3	0	—		11	0
BATE Borisov	Total		22	1	3	0	0	0	25	1
Career total			193	14	12	1	0	0	205	15
