= 2023 Armenian Cup final =

- Event: 2022–23 Armenian Cup
Shirak	Urartu
1	2
- Date: 13 May 2023
- Venue: Republican Stadium, Yerevan
- Referee: Andris Treimanis (Latvia)

The 2023 Armenian Cup final was the 32nd Armenian Cup Final, and the final match of the 2022–23 Armenian Cup. It was played at the Republican Stadium in Yerevan, Armenia, on 13 May 2022, and contested by Shirak and Urartu, with Urartu winning their fourth title.

== Match ==
=== Details ===
13 May 2023
19:00 AMT

Shirak	1–2	Urartu
Bakayoko 6'	Report	Khurtsidze 1'; Melkonyan 85'

Republican Stadium, Yerevan
Referee: Andris Treimanis (Latvia)

Shirak	Urartu

GK	1	(Russia) Egor Achinov
DF	5	(Armenia) Arsen Sadoyan
DF	26	(Serbia) Aleksa Vidić
DF	29	(Serbia) Marko Prljević
DF	99	(Armenia) Robert Darbinyan
MF	6	(Armenia) Rafik Misakyan		(substituted off) 74'
MF	19	(Ivory Coast) Junior Magico Traore
MF	21	(Ivory Coast) Donald Kodia
MF	77	(Ivory Coast) Moussa Bakayoko	(yellow card) 65' (yellow-red card) 72'
FW	9	(Armenia) Lyova Mryan	(yellow card) 18'	(substituted off) 64'
FW	23	(Ivory Coast) Vally Cisse		(substituted off) 79'
Substitutes:
GK	96	(Armenia) Sokrat Hovhannisyan
GK	55	(Armenia) Lyova Karapetyan
DF	2	(Armenia) Robert Hakobyan		(substituted in) 79'
DF	3	(Armenia) Hamlet Mnatsakanyan
DF	4	(Armenia) Artyom Mikaelyan
DF	7	(Armenia) Seryozha Urushanyan
MF	8	(Armenia) Erik Vardanyan
MF	14	(Ivory Coast) Allasane Doumbia		(substituted in) 64'
MF	22	(Armenia) Sergey Manukyan
FW	28	(Armenia) Narek Khachatryan
MF	30	(Armenia) Levon Darbinyan		(substituted in) 74'
MF	43	(Armenia) Suren Tsarukyan
Manager:
(Armenia) Edgar Torosyan

GK	42	(Russia) Aleksandr Melikhov
DF	2	(Ghana) Nana Antwi	(substituted off) 80'
DF	4	(Ukraine) Yevhen Tsymbalyuk
DF	34	(Armenia) Erik Piloyan
DF	88	(Armenia) Zhirayr Margaryan
MF	8	(Armenia) Ugochukwu Iwu
MF	23	(Armenia) Aras Özbiliz	(substituted off) 90+1'
MF	27	(Russia) David Khurtsidze
MF	33	(Brazil) Marcos Júnior	(substituted off) 90+1'
MF	90	(Russia) Oleg Polyakov	(substituted off) 46'
FW	13	(Ukraine) Dmytro Khlyobas	(substituted off) 66'
Substitutes:
GK	24	(Armenia) Arsen Beglaryan
GK	22	(Armenia) Mkhitar Umreyan
DF	6	(Armenia) Arman Ghazaryan
MF	9	(Armenia) Narek Aghasaryan
FW	10	(Armenia) Karen Melkonyan	(substituted in) 80'
FW	15	(Russia) Maksim Mayrovich	(substituted in) 90+1'
FW	18	(Russia) Leon Sabua	(substituted in) 66'
FW	21	(Armenia) Narek Grigoryan	(substituted in) 46'
MF	25	(Burkina Faso) Dramane Salou	(substituted in) 90+1'
DF	31	(Ukraine) Ivan Zotko
DF	35	(Brazil) Rafael Carioca
DF	36	(Armenia) Khariton Ayvazyan
DF	67	(Ukraine) Vadym Paramonov
FW	99	(France) Yaya Sanogo
Manager:
(Russia) Dmitri Gunko

Man of the Match:

Assistant referees:
Haralds Gudermanis (Latvia)
Aleksejs Spasjonņikovs (Latvia)
Fourth official:
Henrik Nalbandyan
VAR:
Zaven Hovhannisyan
VAR assistant:
Mesrop Ghazaryan

Match rules

- 90 minutes
- 30 minutes of extra time if necessary
- Penalty shoot-out if scores still level
- Twelve named substitutes
- Maximum of five substitutions, with a sixth allowed in extra time
