= Arman Ghazaryan =

Armenian footballer

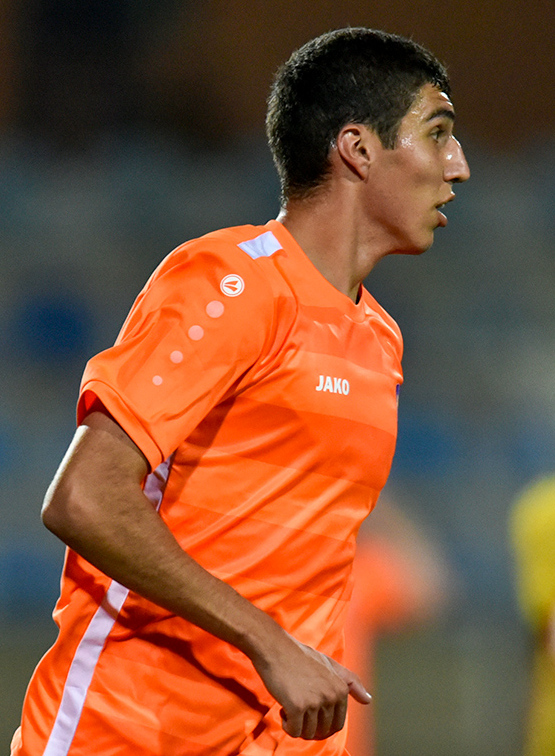
- Ghazaryan in 2022

Personal information
- Date of birth: 24 July 2001 (age 25)
- Place of birth: Yerevan, Armenia
- Height: 1.91 m (6 ft 3 in)
- Position: Centre back

Team information
- Current team: Urartu
- Number: 4

Senior career*
Years	Team	Apps	(Gls)
2019–2022	BKMA Yerevan	55	(6)
2022–	Urartu	78	(4)
2025	→ Alashkert (loan)	8	(0)

International career^{‡}
2017	Armenia U17	3	(0)
2018–2019	Armenia U18	10	(0)
2018–2019	Armenia U19	22	(1)
2021–2022	Armenia U21	5	(0)
2022–	Armenia	2	(0)
- * Club domestic league appearances and goals as of 18 June 2026 @14:15(AEST) ‡ National team caps and goals as of 9 June 2026

Arman Ghazaryan (Armenian: Արման Ղազարյան, born 24 July 2001) is an Armenian professional footballer who plays as a centre-back for Armenian Premier League club Urartu and the Armenia national team.

== Early life ==
As a youth player, Ghazaryan received interest from Ligue 1 side OL.

== Club career ==
Arman Ghazaryan started playing football at the age of 5, attending Urartu youth school (formerly Banants FC). In 2012, he was recognized as the best defender of the championship as part of the Urartu youth team.

In 2019, the young player temporarily began to play as part of the BKMA Yerevan, where, after playing 2 seasons and several months, in the winter of 2022 he returned to his native club. Since the beginning of the second half 21/22 season, he has been the main defender of his native club.

In February 2025, he went on loan to Alashkert until the end of the 2024–25 season.

== International career ==
Ghazaryan represented Armenia at all age groups at youth level. He represented Armenia at the 2019 UEFA European Under-19 Championship.

In 2023, he was called up to represented Armenia at senior level. Ghazaryan made his senior international debut for Armenia national team in a friendly 2–0 loss to Albania on 19 November 2022, where he came in off the bench.

== Style of play ==
Mainly operating as a defender, Ghazaryan is known for his passing ability.

== Career statistics ==
=== International ===
As of 9 June 2026

Armenia
Year	Apps	Goals
2022	1	0
2026	1	0
Total	2	0

== Honours ==
=== Club ===
Urartu

- Armenian Premier League: 2022–23
- Armenian Cup: 2022–23
