= 2016 Armenian Cup final =

- Event: 2015–16 Armenian Cup
Banants	Mika
2	0
- Date: 4 May 2016
- Venue: Republican Stadium, Yerevan
- Referee: Suren Baliyan (Yerevan)
- Attendance: 3,000

The 2016 Armenian Cup final was the 25th Armenian Cup Final, and the final match of the 2015–16 Armenian Cup. It was played at the Republican Stadium in Yerevan, Armenia, on 4 May 2016, and was contested by Banants and Mika.

It was both Banants and Mika's eighth cup final appearance, with Mika suffering defeat in the previous years final to Pyunik, with Banants last appearance coming in 2010 and also ending in defeat to Pyunik. Banants won 2–0, with both goals coming in the first-half, thanks to a Laércio penalty and a Atsamaz Burayev strike.

== Match ==
=== Details ===
4 May 2016
19:00 AMT

Banants	2–0	Mika
Laércio 3' (pen.); Burayev 38'	Report

Republican Stadium, Yerevan
Attendance: 3,000
Referee: Suren Baliyan (Yerevan)

Banants	Mika

GK	22	(Armenia) Stepan Ghazaryan
DF	2	(Russia) Aslan Kalmanov
DF	6	(Russia) Soslan Kachmazov		(substituted off) 90+1'
DF	19	(North Macedonia) Vlatko Drobarov	(yellow card) 31'
DF	55	(Russia) Layonel Adams
MF	5	(Armenia) Hakob Hakobyan
MF	14	(Peru) Claudio Torrejón	(yellow card) 57'
MF	16	(Argentina) Miguel López	(yellow card) 70'	(substituted off) 78'
MF	17	(Armenia) Zaven Badoyan		(substituted off) 83'
FW	10	(Brazil) Laércio
FW	90	(Russia) Atsamaz Burayev		(substituted off) 86'
Substitutes:
GK	1	(Armenia) Grigor Makaryan
MF	4	(Armenia) Aleksandr Hovhannisyan
MF	7	(Armenia) Petros Avetisyan
MF	15	(North Macedonia) Jasmin Mecinovikj	(yellow card) 88'	(substituted on) 83'
MF	18	(Armenia) Vahagn Ayvazyan		(substituted on) 78'
FW	20	(North Macedonia) Denis Mahmudov		(substituted on) 86'
FW	24	(Armenia) Edgar Movsesyan		(substituted on) 90+1'
Manager:
(Spain) Tito Ramallo

GK	1	(Armenia) Arsen Beglaryan
DF	4	(Russia) Dmitri Chistyakov	(yellow card) 2'
DF	5	(Russia) Nikita Chicherin
DF	13	(Russia) Dmitri Kudinov
DF	19	(Montenegro) Miloš Kovačević	(yellow card) 65'
DF	23	(Armenia) Vardan Movsisyan		(substituted off) 64'
MF	7	(Russia) Mikheil Gorelishvili		(substituted off) 80'
MF	14	(Ivory Coast) Aaron Kpehia	(yellow card) 45'
MF	15	(Russia) Aleksei Kiselyov
MF	18	(Russia) Dmitri Lushnikov	(yellow card) 57'
FW	11	(Russia) Sergei Shumilin	(yellow card) 40'	(substituted off) 80'
Substitutes:
GK	16	(Armenia) Henri Avagyan
MF	6	(Armenia) Samvel Melkonyan		(substituted on) 80'
MF	8	(Serbia) Tarik Čmajčanin
FW	9	(Ivory Coast) Bruno Kone		(substituted on) 46'
FW	10	(Georgia (country)) Ioseb Chakhvashvili	(yellow card) 81'	(substituted on) 80'
DF	17	(Armenia) Ashot Karapetyan
MF	20	(Russia) Artyom Yarmolitsky
Manager:
(Russia) Sergei Yuran

Man of the match:

Assistant referees:
Mesrop Ghazaryan (Yerevan)
Vanik Simonyan (Yerevan)
Fourth official:
Erik Arevshatyan (Yerevan)

Match rules

- 90 minutes
- 30 minutes of extra time if necessary
- Penalty shoot-out if scores still level
- Seven named substitutes
- Maximum of four substitutions, with a fifth allowed in extra time
