= 2018 Armenian Cup final =

- Event: 2017–18 Armenian Cup
Gandzasar Kapan	Alashkert
1	1
- After extra time Gandzasar Kapan won 4–3 on penalties
- Date: 16 May 2018
- Venue: Republican Stadium, Yerevan
- Referee: Artur Simonyan
- Attendance: 1,000

The 2018 Armenian Cup final was the 27th Armenian Cup Final, and the final match of the 2017–18 Armenian Cup. It was played at the Republican Stadium in Yerevan, Armenia, on 16 May 2018, and was contested by Gandzasar Kapan and Alashkert. It was Alashkert's first Cup final appearance, and Gandzasar Kapan's second, having lost to Pyunik in 2014. Gandzasar Kapan were victorious 4–3 on penalties after the game finished 0–0 in normal time and 1–1 after extra time, with Mihran Manasyan scoring for Alashkert and Lubambo Musonda scoring the equaled for Gandzasar Kapan.

== Match ==
=== Details ===
16 May 2018
19:00 AMT

Gandzasar Kapan	1–1 (a.e.t.)	Alashkert
Musonda 116'	Report	M.Manasyan 106'
Penalties
Ishkhanyan (penalty missed); Christian (penalty scored); A.Khachatryan (penalty scored); Musonda (penalty scored); Harutyunyan (penalty scored)	4–3	(penalty scored) Nenadović; (penalty scored) Arta.Yedigaryan; (penalty scored) Daghbashyan; (penalty missed) Manoyan; (penalty missed) T.Voskanyan

Republican Stadium, Yerevan
Attendance: 1,000
Referee: Artur Simonyan (Artashat)

Gandzasar Kapan	Alashkert

GK	77	(Armenia) Gevorg Kasparov
DF	2	(Haiti) Alex Junior Christian
DF	13	(Serbia) Damir Memović	(yellow card) 25'	(substituted off) 106'
DF	18	(Armenia) Hayk Ishkhanyan
DF	23	(Armenia) Ara Khachatryan
MF	6	(Colombia) Wbeymar
MF	11	(Zambia) Lubambo Musonda
MF	20	(Armenia) Artur Yuspashyan		(substituted off) 114'
FW	9	(Armenia) Gevorg Nranyan		(substituted off) 72'
FW	14	(Ivory Coast) Issiaka Bamba		(substituted off) 103'
FW	22	(Armenia) Gegham Harutyunyan	(yellow card) 18'
Substitutes:
GK	12	(Armenia) Grigor Meliksetyan
MF	5	(Armenia) Davit Terteryan
FW	7	(Armenia) Vardan Pogosyan		(substituted on) 72'
DF	19	(Armenia) Vaspurak Minasyan		(substituted on) 114'
DF	28	(Armenia) Martin Grigoryan		(substituted on) 108'
MF	31	(Russia) Artur Adamyan		(substituted on) 103'
DF	88	(Russia) Dmitri Yashin
Manager:
(Armenia) Ashot Barseghyan

GK	55	(Serbia) Ognjen Čančarević	(yellow card) 103'
DF	2	(Armenia) Taron Voskanyan
DF	5	(Serbia) Danijel Stojković
DF	8	(Armenia) Gagik Daghbashyan
DF	13	(Croatia) Dino Škvorc		(substituted off) 60'
MF	9	(Armenia) Artak Dashyan		(substituted off) 78'
MF	17	(Armenia) Artak Yedigaryan
MF	20	(Armenia) Artur Yedigaryan		(substituted off) 82'
MF	21	(Armenia) Artak Grigoryan
MF	14	(Armenia) Artem Simonyan		(substituted off) 64'
FW	15	(Serbia) Uroš Nenadović
Substitutes:
GK	93	(Armenia) Arsen Beglaryan
DF	3	(Armenia) Andranik Voskanyan
DF	4	(Serbia) Mladen Zeljković		(substituted on) 60'
FW	7	(Armenia) Mihran Manasyan		(substituted on) 78'
MF	10	(Armenia) Khoren Veranyan
MF	19	(Armenia) David Manoyan		(substituted on) 64'
MF	24	(Russia) Sergei Serchenkov
Manager:
(Armenia) Varuzhan Sukiasyan

Man of the Match:

Assistant referees:
Mesrop Ghazaryan (Yerevan)
Vanik Simonyan (Yerevan)
Fourth official:
Artur Gdlyan (Yerevan)

Match rules

- 90 minutes
- 30 minutes of extra time if necessary
- Penalty shoot-out if scores still level
- Seven named substitutes
- Maximum of three substitutions, with a fourth allowed in extra time
