= Gonçalo Silva =

Portuguese footballer

Personal information
- Full name: Gonçalo Filipe Oliveira Silva
- Date of birth: 4 June 1991 (age 35)
- Place of birth: Barreiro, Portugal
- Height: 1.86 m (6 ft 1 in)
- Position: Centre-back

Team information
- Current team: Farense
- Number: 37

Youth career
- 2001–2010: Barreirense

Senior career*
Years	Team	Apps	(Gls)
2010–2012	Vitória Guimarães	0	(0)
2010–2011	→ Lousada (loan)	28	(0)
2011–2012	→ Atlético (loan)	28	(0)
2012–2015	Braga B	83	(2)
2015–2018	Belenenses	73	(4)
2018–2021	B-SAD	68	(1)
2021–2022	Radomiak	11	(0)
2022–2024	Farense	58	(1)
2024–2026	Noah	38	(4)
2026–	Farense	5	(2)

International career
2012	Portugal U21	1	(0)
- * Club domestic league appearances and goals as of 18:16, 4 October 2026 (UTC)

Gonçalo Filipe Oliveira Silva (born 4 June 1991) is a Portuguese professional footballer who plays as a central defender for Liga Portugal 2 club Farense.

== Club career ==
Born in Barreiro, Setúbal District, Silva spent his formative years with his hometown side F.C. Barreirense before joining Vitória S.C. in 2010. He spent the next two seasons out on loan to A.D. Lousada (third division) and Atlético Clube de Portugal (second).

Silva terminated his contract with the club from Guimarães alleging unpaid wages, and signed a four-year deal with local rivals S.C. Braga on 9 July 2012. He played exclusively for the reserve team in the second tier, and scored a first career goal on 27 April 2014 in a 4–2 home win against C.S. Marítimo B; he was an unused substitute in three Primeira Liga games for the main squad.

In the summer of 2015, Silva transferred to C.F. Os Belenenses of the top flight, his debut in the competition taking place on 26 October in a 1–0 home victory over C.F. União where he featured ten minutes. He extended his contract by one year in March 2017 to last until 2020, eventually being named captain.

Silva moved abroad for the first time in July 2021, joining Radomiak Radom from Poland on a two-year deal. He returned to his homeland on 16 June 2022, with second-tier S.C. Farense. He contributed 25 appearances in his debut campaign in a promotion where the runners-up conceded the fewest goals, and subsequently agreed to a one-year extension.

In the 2024 off-season, Silva signed with Armenian Premier League club FC Noah, where he shared teams with his compatriots Hélder Ferreira, Gonçalo Gregório and Rui Mota (manager). In his first season, he claimed the double.

Silva returned to Portugal and Farense on 10 June 2026, on an initial one-year contract. The 35-year-old scored on his second-division debut on 9 August, helping the hosts to defeat S.C.U. Torreense 2–1.

== International career ==
Silva won his only cap for Portugal at under-21 level on 14 August 2012, playing the second half of the 2–1 friendly defeat of Macedonia held in Ponte de Sor.

== Honours ==
Noah

- Armenian Premier League: 2024–25
- Armenian Cup: 2024–25 2025–26
- Armenian Supercup: 2025
