= 2019 Armenian Cup final =

- Event: 2018–19 Armenian Cup
Alashkert	Lori
1	0
- Date: 8 May 2019
- Venue: Banants Stadium, Yerevan
- Referee: Alberto Undiano Mallenco (Spain)
- Attendance: 4,000

The 2019 Armenian Cup final was the 28th Armenian Cup Final, and the final match of the 2018–19 Armenian Cup. It was played at the Banants Stadium in Yerevan, Armenia, on 8 May 2019, and was contested by Alashkert and Lori. It was Alashkert's second Cup final appearance, having lost on penalties to Gandzasar Kapan the previous year, whilst it was Lori's first appearance in the final. Alashkert defeated Noah 1–0 thanks to an own goal by Ubong Friday in the 65th minute.

== Match ==
The match was refereed by Spanish referee Alberto Undiano Mallenco, and his two assistants Iñigo Prieto López and Roberto Alonso Fernandez.

=== Details ===
8 May 2019
19:30 AMT

Alashkert	1–0	Lori
Friday 65' (o.g.)	Report

Banants Stadium, Yerevan
Attendance: 4,000
Referee: Alberto Undiano Mallenco (Spain)

Alashkert	Lori

GK	55	(Serbia) Ognjen Čančarević
DF	3	(Armenia) Taron Voskanyan
DF	5	(Serbia) Danijel Stojković
DF	6	(Serbia) Goran Antonić
DF	8	(Armenia) Gagik Daghbashyan
DF	13	(Russia) Denis Tumasyan
MF	2	(Ivory Coast) Joël Damahou
MF	20	(Armenia) Artur Yedigaryan		(substituted off) 82'
MF	21	(Armenia) Artak Grigoryan	(yellow card) 61'
FW	15	(Serbia) Uroš Nenadović		(substituted off) 82'
FW	19	(Russia) Aleksandr Prudnikov		(substituted off) 90+2'
Substitutes:
GK	1	(Armenia) Henri Avagyan
DF	4	(Serbia) Mladen Zeljković
DF	22	(Armenia) Hrayr Mkoyan		(substituted in) 82'
MF	14	(Brazil) Gustavo Marmentini
MF	17	(Armenia) Artak Yedigaryan		(substituted in) 82'
FW	10	(Armenia) Edgar Manucharyan		(substituted in) 90+2'
FW	12	(Russia) Nikita Tankov
Manager:
(Armenia) Abraham Khashmanyan

GK	77	(Russia) Arsen Siukayev
DF	2	(Ghana) Nana Antwi
DF	3	(Uganda) Alex Kakuba	(substituted off) 79'
DF	6	(Ghana) Annan Mensah
DF	22	(Armenia) Hayk Ishkhanyan
DF	99	(Armenia) Arman Mkrtchyan	(substituted off) 82'
MF	8	(Armenia) Aram Kocharyan	(substituted off) 12'
MF	10	(Nigeria) Isah Aliyu
MF	17	(Nigeria) Ugochukwu Iwu
FW	26	(Nigeria) Sunday Ingbede
FW	97	(Haiti) Jonel Désiré
Substitutes:
GK	33	(Ukraine) Danylo Ryabenko
DF	15	(Nigeria) Deou Dosa
DF	18	(Armenia) Artyom Khachaturov
MF	5	(Nigeria) Julius Ufuoma
MF	20	(Nigeria) Ubong Friday		(substituted in) 12'
FW	9	(Ghana) Enock Darko		(substituted in) 79'
FW	19	(Nigeria) Nwani Ikechukwu		(substituted in) 82'
Manager:
(Armenia) Artur Petrosyan

Man of the Match:

Assistant referees:
Iñigo Prieto López (Spain)
Roberto Alonso Fernandez (Spain)
Fourth official:
Erik Arevshatyan (Yerevan)

Match rules

- 90 minutes
- 30 minutes of extra time if necessary
- Penalty shoot-out if scores still level
- Seven named substitutes
- Maximum of three substitutions, with a fourth allowed in extra time
