= 2017 Armenian Cup final =

- Event: 2016–17 Armenian Cup
Pyunik	Shirak
0	3
- Date: 24 May 2017
- Venue: Republican Stadium, Yerevan
- Referee: Zaven Hovhannisyan (Yerevan)
- Attendance: 2,000

The 2017 Armenian Cup final was the 26th Armenian Cup Final, and the final match of the 2016–17 Armenian Cup. It was played at the Republican Stadium in Yerevan, Armenia, on 24 May 2017, and was contested by Shirak and Pyunik.

It was Pyunik's twelfth Cup final appearance, first since defeating Mika in 2015, and Shirak's seventh and first since losing to Pyunik in 2013. Shirak ran out 3–0 winners over Pyunik, thanks to two goals from Kyrian Nwabueze and one from Vahan Bichakhchyan.

== Match ==
=== Details ===
24 May 2017
19:00 AMT

Pyunik	0–3	Shirak
	Report	Nwabueze 6', 38'; Bichakhchyan 28'

Republican Stadium, Yerevan
Attendance: 3,000
Referee: Zaven Hovhannisyan (Yerevan)

Pyunik	Shirak

GK	13	(Armenia) Valeriy Voskonyan
DF	2	(Armenia) Serob Grigoryan
DF	3	(Armenia) Artur Kartashyan
DF	4	(Armenia) Aram Shakhnazaryan
DF	5	(Armenia) Armen Manucharyan
MF	6	(Armenia) Narek Aslanyan		(substituted off) 55'
MF	7	(Armenia) Petros Avetisyan		(substituted off) 71'
MF	26	(Armenia) Alik Arakelyan		(substituted off) 71'
MF	30	(Armenia) Vahagn Hayrapetyan
FW	10	(Armenia) Vardan Pogosyan	(yellow card) 65'
FW	33	(Russia) Gevorg Arutyunyan		(substituted off) 55'
Substitutes:
GK	12	(Armenia) Gor Manukyan
MF	8	(Armenia) Armen Nahapetyan		(substituted in) 71'
FW	11	(Armenia) Erik Petrosyan		(substituted in) 71'
MF	15	(Armenia) Erik Vardanyan		(substituted in) 55'
DF	16	(Armenia) Robert Hakobyan
MF	20	(Armenia) Samvel Spertsyan
MF	23	(Armenia) Hovhannes Harutyunyan		(substituted in) 55'
Manager:
(Armenia) Artak Oseyan

GK	45	(Russia) Vsevolod Yermakov
DF	6	(Serbia) Marko Prljević
DF	21	(Armenia) Gevorg Hovhannisyan
DF	23	(Armenia) Robert Darbinyan
DF	25	(Armenia) Aghvan Davoyan
MF	8	(Armenia) Rumyan Hovsepyan		(substituted off) 87'
MF	17	(Armenia) Vahan Bichakhchyan
MF	19	(Nigeria) Solomon Udo
MF	22	(Armenia) Ghukas Poghosyan		(substituted off) 64'
MF	88	(Ivory Coast) Moussa Paul Bakayoko
FW	24	(Nigeria) Kyrian Nwabueze
Substitutes:
GK	13	(Armenia) Anatoliy Ayvazov
DF	3	(Armenia) Artyom Mikaelyan		(substituted in) 74'
FW	7	(Armenia) Viulen Ayvazyan	(yellow card) 89'	(substituted in) 64'
FW	18	(Armenia) Aram Muradyan
MF	20	(Cameroon) Oumarou Kaina
MF	28	(Ivory Coast) Mohamed Kaba		(substituted in) 87'
DF	42	(Ukraine) Semen Datsenko
Manager:
(Armenia) Vardan Bichakhchyan

Man of the Match:

Assistant referees:
Mesrop Ghazaryan (Yerevan)
Vanik Simonyan (Yerevan)
Fourth official:
Artur Gdlyan (Yerevan)

Match rules

- 90 minutes
- 30 minutes of extra time if necessary
- Penalty shoot-out if scores still level
- Seven named substitutes
- Maximum of four substitutions, with a fifth allowed in extra time
