= 2024–25 Armenian Premier League =

Armenian Premier League
- Season: 2024–25
- Dates: 2 August 2024 – 31 May 2025
- Champions: Noah (1st title)
- Relegated: West Armenia
- Champions League: Noah
- Conference League: Ararat-Armenia; Urartu; Pyunik
- Matches: 165
- Goals: 518 (3.14 per match)
- Top goalscorer: Gonçalo Gregório (20)
- Biggest home win: Urartu 8-0 West Armenia (3 May 2025)
- Biggest away win: Alashkert 0–6 Noah (16 October 2024)
- Highest scoring: Noah 7–1 West Armenia (15 December 2024); Urartu 8-0 West Armenia (3 May 2025)
- Longest winning run: Noah (19)
- Longest unbeaten run: Noah (21)
- Longest winless run: Gandzasar Kapan (26)
- Longest losing run: Gandzasar Kapan (8)
- All statistics correct as of 28 May 2025.

The 2024–25 Armenian Premier League, known as the Armenian Fastex Premier League (Armenian: Հայաստանի Պրեմիեր Լիգա) for sponsorship reasons, was the 33rd season of the league since its establishment.

== Season events ==
On 3 July, the Football Federation of Armenia announced that 11 teams would take part in this seasons Armenian Premier League, with BKMA Yerevan being saved from relegation and Gandzasar Kapan being promoted from Armenian First League, with each team playing each other three times.

On 13 September, Fastex was announced as the new title sponsor of the Armenian Premier League, for the next three seasons.

On 21 November, the Round 17 match between Pyunik and West Armenia was cancelled after West Armenia did not attend due to a protest by their players over late payment of salaries. On 6 December, the match was awarded as a 3-0 technical defeat in favour of Pyunik.

On 28 February, the Round 21 match between Ararat Yerevan and Gandzasar Kapan was abandoned due to crowd trouble.

On 15 May, the postponed West Armenia versus Ararat-Armenia scheduled for 9 May, was awarded as a 3-0 technical defeat in favour of Ararat-Armenia. Due to this being the second time that West Armenia failed to show up for a match, they were disqualified from the league.

== Teams ==
Locations of the teams

Club	Location	Stadium	Capacity
Alashkert	Abovyan	Abovyan City Stadium	3,100
Ararat Yerevan	Yerevan (Kentron)	Vazgen Sargsyan Republican Stadium	14,403
Ararat-Armenia	Yerevan (Avan)	Yerevan Football Academy Stadium^{1}	1,428
BKMA	Yerevan (Avan)	Yerevan Football Academy Stadium^{1}	1,428
Gandzasar Kapan	Yerevan (Shengavit)	Junior Sport Stadium^{1}	1,000
Noah	Abovyan	Abovyan City Stadium^{1}	3,100
Pyunik	Yerevan (Shengavit)	Junior Sport Stadium	1,000
Shirak	Gyumri	Gyumri City Stadium	4,000
Urartu	Yerevan (Malatia-Sebastia)	Urartu Stadium	4,860
Van	Charentsavan	Charentsavan City Stadium	5,000
West Armenia	Yerevan (Shengavit)	Junior Sport Stadium	1,000

=== Personnel and sponsorship ===
Team	Manager	Captain	Kit manufacturer	Shirt sponsor
Alashkert	(Armenia) Edgar Torosyan	(Armenia) Armen Manucharyan	(Germany) Sport-Saller	Fastex
Ararat Yerevan	(Armenia) Tigran Yesayan	(Armenia) Gor Malakyan	(Switzerland) Fourteen	Fastex, AWI International
Ararat-Armenia	(Armenia) Vardan Minasyan	(Armenia) Armen Ambartsumyan	(Germany) Puma	Tashir Group
BKMA	(Armenia) Armen Gyulbudaghyants	(Armenia) Argishti Petrosyan	(Italy) Macron	–
Gandzasar Kapan	(Armenia) Karen Barseghyan	(Armenia) Artak Yedigaryan	(Spain) Kelme	–
Noah	(Portugal) Rui Mota	(Armenia) Hovhannes Hambardzumyan	(Germany) Adidas	imaginelive
Pyunik	(Armenia) Yegishe Melikyan	(Armenia) Edgar Malakyan	(Spain) Joma	Fastex
Shirak	(Armenia) Rafael Nazaryan	(Armenia) Hrayr Mkoyan	(Germany) Adidas	Fastex
Urartu	(Russia) Dmitri Gunko	(Armenia) Zhirayr Margaryan	(Germany) Puma	–
Van	(Armenia) Vahe Gevorgyan	(Armenia) Karen Nalbandyan	(Russia) Jögel	yo HEALTH, Rare, Click Market
West Armenia	(Armenia) Patrik Papyan	(Russia) Zakhar Tarasenko	(Armenia) Melante	Amptricity

=== Managerial changes ===
Team	Outgoing manager	Manner of departure	Date of vacancy	Position in table	Incoming manager	Date of appointment
Noah	Carlos Inarejos	Contract ended	26 May 2024	Pre-season	Rui Mota	14 June 2024
Alashkert	Vahe Gevorgyan	Contract ended	17 June 2024	Pre-season	Abraham Khashmanyan	21 June 2024
Van	Arthur Hovhannisyan	Contract ended		Pre-season	Vahe Gevorgyan	2 July 2024
West Armenia	Khoren Veranyan	Contract ended		Pre-season	Patrik Papyan	22 July 2024
Shirak	Arsen Hovhannisyan		9 October 2024	7th	Rafael Nazaryan	9 October 2024
Alashkert	Abraham Khashmanyan	Fired	22 January 2025	10th	Edgar Torosyan	19 February 2025

== League table ==
Pos	Team	Pld	W	D	L	GF	GA	GD	Pts	Qualification or relegation
1	Noah (C)	30	24	3	3	92	20	+72	75	Qualification for the Champions League first qualifying round
2	Ararat-Armenia	30	21	3	6	75	28	+47	66	Qualification for the Conference League second qualifying round (Note: The 2024–25 Armenian Cup winners qualified for the Conference League second qualifying round. Since the cup winners (Noah) qualified based on league position, the Conference League second round spot was passed to the second-placed team, and the second Conference League first round spot was passed to the fourth-placed team.)
3	Urartu	30	19	5	6	64	31	+33	62	Qualification for the Conference League first qualifying round
4	Pyunik	30	17	2	11	59	37	+22	53	Qualification for the Conference League first qualifying round
5	Van	30	15	7	8	56	36	+20	52	
6	BKMA	30	10	6	14	44	54	−10	36	
7	Shirak	30	10	5	15	30	50	−20	35	
8	Ararat Yerevan	30	9	5	16	36	59	−23	32	
9	Alashkert	30	6	8	16	24	52	−28	26	
10	West Armenia (Note: On 7 May 2025, it was announced that West Armenia were on the verge of expulsion after a no show against Ararat-Armenia. On 17 May 2025, they were officially expelled and all games were awarded 3–0 to their opponents.) (D, R)	30	7	2	21	22	78	−56	23	Relegation to the Armenian First League
11	Gandzasar Kapan	30	2	4	24	16	73	−57	10	Spared from relegation

Source: FFA
Rules for classification: 1) Points; 2) Head-to-head points; 3) Head-to-head goal difference; 4) Head-to-head goals scored; 5) Matches won; 6) Goal difference; 7) Less red cards; 8) Less yellow cards; 9) Fair-play ranking 10) Draw
(C) Champions; (D) Disqualified; (R) Relegated

== Fixtures and results ==
=== Results table ===
Home \ Away	ALA	ARA	AAR	BKM	GAK	NOA	PYU	SHI	URA	VAN	WAR	ALA	ARA	AAR	BKM	GAK	NOA	PYU	SHI	URA	VAN	WAR
Alashkert		0–1	2–2	2–0	2–2	0–6	0–2	1–3	0–3	1–1	0–2					1–0	1–0			1–1	2–2	3–0
Ararat Yerevan	2–0		0–0	2–2	2–0	2–1	0–2	1–2	0–1	0–3	2–3	3–2			1–1	1–1			1–2	2–4	2–1	
Ararat-Armenia	3–1	3–2		2–0	3–0	0–1	1–3	4–0	1–2	1–1	3–0	3–0	6–0		4–0			3–2	5–1			
BKMA	1–0	1–1	2–4		2–1	1–2	1–2	0–2	2–1	0–1	3–0	2–0					1–5		3–2	0–1	1–1	
Gandzasar	0–1	0–3	0–3	1–6		0–3	0–5	1–2	0–4	1–2	0–1			0–4	2–2			1–3	1–0			
Noah	4–0	4–0	2–1	3–0	7–0		2–0	4–0	2–1	5–0	7–1		3–0	2–0		1–0		2–1				5–1
Pyunik	0–2	3–0	1–2	4–1	1–0	1–3		2–0	0–3	1–0	3–0	1–1	5–2		1–2				6–1	1–4		
Shirak	0–0	1–3	0–3	0–0	0–0	0–5	1–0		0–2	0–2	2–0	4–0					1–2			1–1	0–1	3–0
Urartu	1–0	1–0	3–1	4–2	2–0	2–1	0–0	1–2		3–1	3–0			0–3		2–1	3–3				0–2	8–0
Van	1–1	4–0	0–2	2–3	6–1	1–1	1–3	1–0	3–1		6–0			2–3		2–0	2–2	3–2				2–0
West Armenia	2–0	1–2	1–2	2–5	2–0	0–4	1–3	0–0	2–2	0–2			2–1	0–3	1–0	0–3		0–1				

Source: Soccerway
Legend: Blue = home team win; Yellow = draw; Red = away team win.

== Season statistics ==
=== Top scorers ===
As of match played 28 May 2025

Rank	Player	Club	Goals
1	(Portuguese Football Federation) Gonçalo Gregório	Noah	20
2	(Cameroonian Football Federation) Marius Noubissi	Ararat-Armenia	18
3	(Nigeria Football Federation) Tenton Yenne	Ararat-Armenia	17
4	(Albanian Football Federation) Eraldo Çinari	Noah	14
4	(Nigeria Football Federation) Yusuf Otubanjo	Pyunik	14
6	(Russian Football Union) Ivan Ignatyev	Urartu	13
7	(Guinean Football Federation) Momo Touré	Van	12
8	(Football Federation of Armenia) Karen Melkonyan	Urartu	10
8	(Football Federation of Armenia) Arayik Eloyan	BKMA Yerevan	10
10	(Brazilian Football Confederation) Matheus Aiás	Noah	9
10	(Ivorian Football Federation) Serges Déblé	Pyunik	9
10	(Portuguese Football Federation) Hélder Ferreira	Noah	9

=== Hat-tricks ===
Player	For	Against	Result	Date	Ref
(Ghana Football Association) John Batigi	Van	West Armenia	6–0 (H)	31 August 2024	
(Cameroonian Football Federation) Marius Noubissi	Ararat-Armenia	Ararat Yerevan	3–2 (H)	18 October 2024	
(Nigeria Football Federation) Yusuf Otubanjo	Pyunik	Gandzasar Kapan	5–0 (A)	7 November 2024	
(Albanian Football Federation) Eraldo Çinari	Noah	Gandzasar Kapan	7–0 (H)	8 December 2024	
(Portuguese Football Federation) Gonçalo Gregório^{4}	Noah	West Armenia	7–1 (H)	15 December 2024	
(Brazilian Football Confederation) Bruno Michel	Urartu	Pyunik	3–0 (A)	9 March 2025	
(Cameroonian Football Federation) Marius Noubissi	Ararat-Armenia	Urartu	3–0 (A)	5 April 2025	
(Football Federation of Armenia) Karen Melkonyan	Urartu	West Armenia	8–0 (H)	3 May 2025	
(Cameroonian Football Federation) Marius Noubissi	Ararat-Armenia	Ararat Yerevan	6–0 (H)	28 May 2025	

- ^{4} Player scored 4 goals

=== Clean sheets ===
As of match played 28 May 2025

Rank	Player	Club	Clean sheets
1	(Russian Football Union) Aleksey Ploshchadny	Noah	10
1	(Football Federation of Armenia) Henri Avagyan	Pyunik/Ararat-Armenia	10
3	(Russian Football Union) Aleksandr Melikhov	Urartu	9
4	(Russian Football Union) Daniil Polyanski	Van	7
4	(Football Association of Serbia) Darko Vukašinović	Shirak	7
4	(Ukrainian Association of Football) Danylo Kucher	Ararat-Armenia	7
4	(Football Federation of Armenia) Arsen Beglaryan	Ararat-Armenia/Van	7
8	(Football Association of Montenegro) Andrija Dragojević	West Armenia	6
9	(Football Federation of Armenia) Ognjen Čančarević	Noah	5
10	(Football Federation of Armenia) Arman Nersesyan	BKMA Yerevan	4

Danylo Kucher & Arsen Beglaryan both played in Ararat-Armenia's 3–0 victory over Gandzasar on 14 September 2024

== Awards ==
=== Monthly awards ===
Month	Manager of the Month		Player of the Month		References
Month	Manager	Club	Player	Club	References
February–March	(Portugal) Rui Mota	Noah	(Armenia) Karen Nalbandian	Van	
May	(Armenia) Vahe Gevorgyan	Van	(Armenia) Karen Melkonyan	Urartu	
