= Andris Treimanis =

Latvian football referee

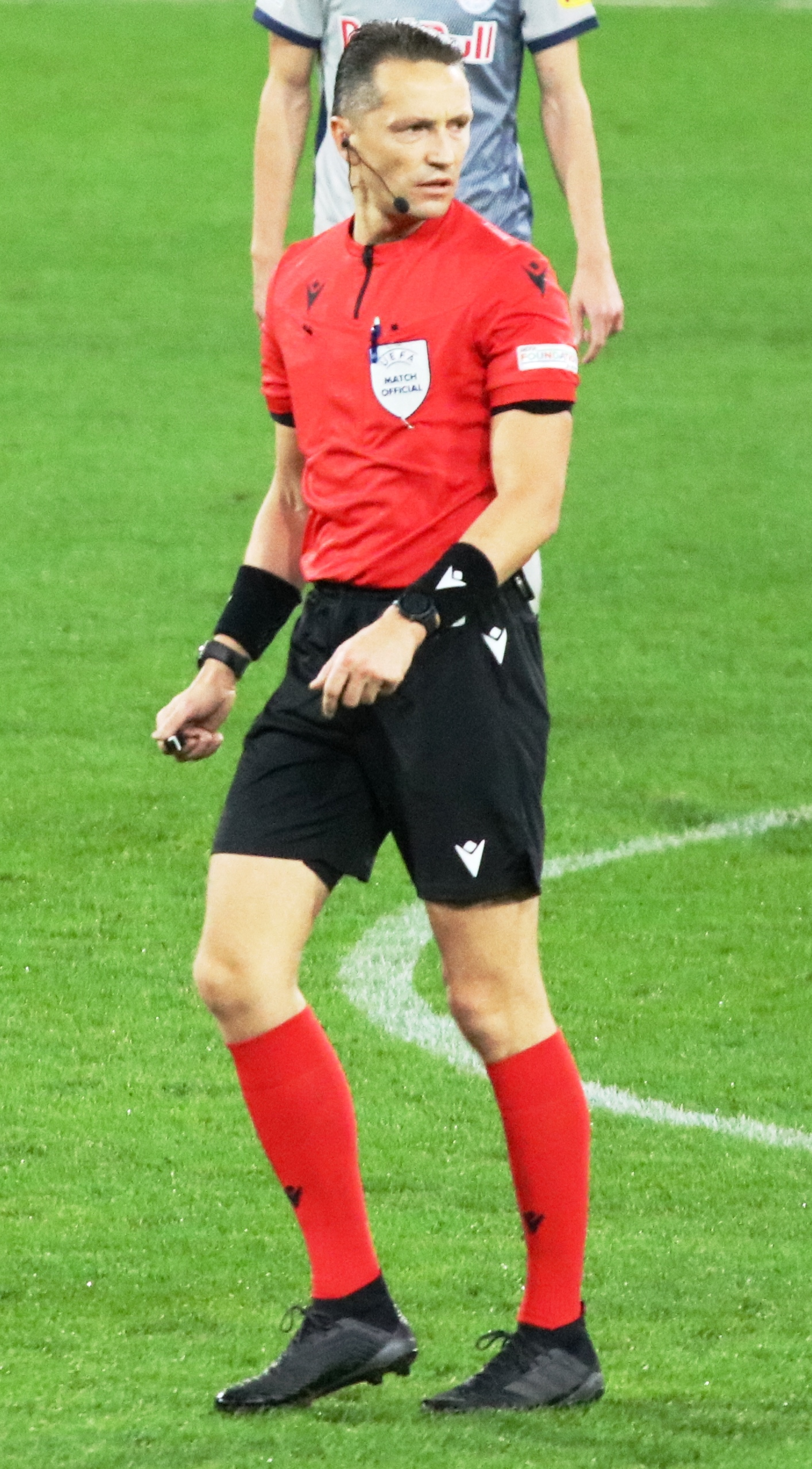
- Born: 16 March 1985 (age 41); Kuldīga, Latvian SSR, Soviet Union

Domestic
Years	League	Role
2006–	Latvian Higher League	Referee

International
Years	League	Role
2011–	FIFA listed	Referee

Andris Treimanis (born 16 March 1985) is a Latvian professional football referee. He has been a full international for FIFA since 2011. He refereed the final of the 2019 FIFA U-17 World Cup in Brazil.

== Career ==
On 12 May 2023, the Football Federation of Armenia announced that Treimanis would take charge of the Armenian Cup Final the next day.
