= Rui Mota =

Portuguese football manager (born 1979)

Personal information
- Full name: Rui Tomás Faustino Pinto da Mota
- Date of birth: 26 March 1979 (age 47)
- Place of birth: Lisbon, Portugal

Team information
- Current team: Waldhof Mannheim (manager)

Managerial career
- Years: Team
- 2024: Dila Gori
- 2024–2025: Noah
- 2025: Ludogorets Razgrad
- 2026–: Waldhof Mannheim

Rui Tomás Faustino Pinto da Mota (born 26 March 1979) is a Portuguese professional football manager who is currently in charge of 3. Liga club Waldhof Mannheim.

== Career ==
Born in Lisbon, Mota was head of the scouting and match analysis department at Sporting CP from 2012 to 2016. He was then assistant manager to former Portugal international Ricardo Sá Pinto at clubs in various countries: Al Fateh, Atromitos, Standard Liège, Legia Warsaw, Braga, Vasco da Gama, Gaziantep, Moreirense and Esteghlal.

In September 2023, Mota was hired as under-19 manager at Šibenik in Croatia, having initially come to the club as a coach for the first team. He quit before the turn of the year.

Mota was given his first job as a head coach in January 2024, on a two-year deal at Dila Gori in Georgia's Erovnuli Liga. In June, with his team leading the league season by a four-point margin, he left for FC Noah in the Armenian Premier League, who paid his release clause. In the UEFA Conference League, his new club became the first team to successfully navigation all four rounds of qualification from the first qualifying round to the playoffs, defeating Greece's AEK Athens in the third qualifying round, and then made it into the group stage. His team won the 2024–25 Armenian Premier League and also the 2024–25 Armenian Cup for a double.

On 13 June 2025, Mota was announced as the manager of Ludogorets Razgrad, reigning champions of the Bulgarian First Professional Football League. He was dismissed on 29 October, with the club in fourth place after 12 games. In June 2026, he was signed by Waldhof Mannheim.

== Honours ==
Noah

- Armenian Premier League: 2024–25
- Armenian Cup: 2024–25

Individual

- Armenian Premier League Manager of the Month: February–March 2025
