= Marius Noubissi =

Cameroonian footballer (born 1996)

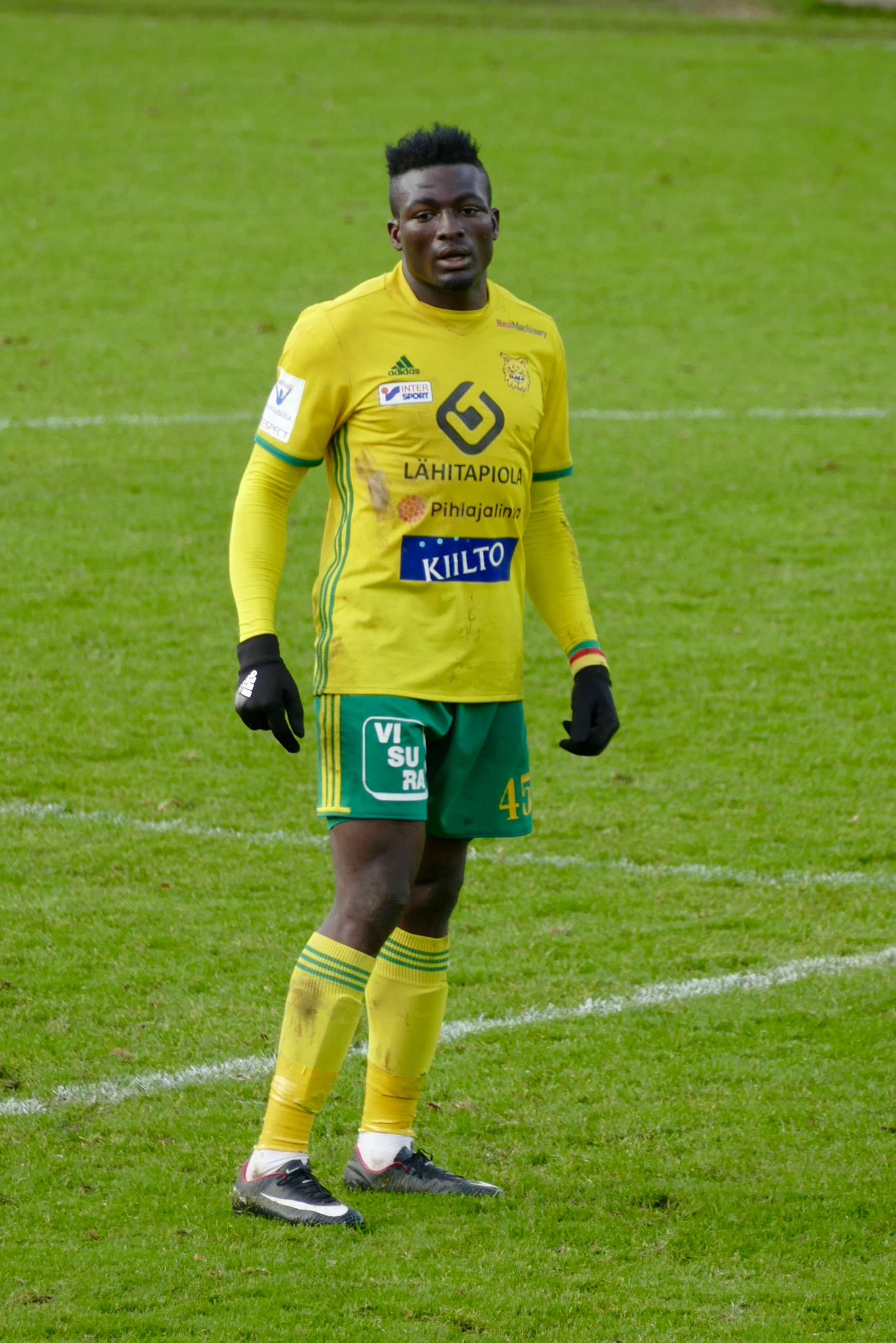
- Noubissi with Ilves in 2017

Personal information
- Date of birth: 28 November 1996 (age 29)
- Place of birth: Yaounde, Cameroon
- Height: 1.80 m (5 ft 11 in)
- Position: Forward

Team information
- Current team: Hapoel Ramat Gan Givatayim
- Number: 9

Youth career
- 2013–2015: Les Astres

Senior career*
Years	Team	Apps	(Gls)
2015	CS Sfaxien	8	(0)
2016–2017	Gil Vicente	9	(1)
2017–2018	Ilves	31	(13)
2018–2022	Beerschot	85	(24)
2022–2024	Valenciennes	21	(2)
2023	Valenciennes II	3	(2)
2024	Patro Eisden	11	(4)
2024–2025	Ararat-Armenia	26	(18)
2025–2026	Pyunik	24	(7)
2026–	Hapoel Ramat Gan Givatayim	8	(1)

International career
- Cameroon U20
- * Club domestic league appearances and goals as of 4 November 2026

Marius Noubissi (born 28 November 1996) is a Cameroonian football player who plays as a forward, for Israeli Premier League club Hapoel Ramat Gan Givatayim.

== Club career ==
He made his professional debut in the Tunisian Ligue Professionnelle 1 for CS Sfaxien on 15 February 2015 in a game against Étoile du Sahel.

On 31 January 2024, Noubissi left Valenciennes by mutual consent.

On 1 February 2024, Noubissi signed a contract with Patro Eisden in Belgium until the end of the season, with an option to extend.

On 18 August 2024, Armenian Premier League club Ararat-Armenia announced the signing of Noubissi. On 6 June 2025, Ararat-Armenia announced the departure of Noubissi.

On 2 July 2025, fellow Armenian Premier League club Pyunik announced the singing of Noubissi. On 26 June 2026, Pyunik announced that Noubissi had left the club.

== Career statistics ==
As of match played 23 May 2026

Appearances and goals by club, season and competition
Club	Season	League			Cup (Note: Includes Finnish Cup, Belgian Cup, Coupe de France and Armenian Cup)		Continental		Other (Note: Includes Armenian Supercup)		Total	
Club	Season	Division	Apps	Goals	Apps	Goals	Apps	Goals	Apps	Goals	Apps	Goals
CS Sfaxien	2014–15	Tunisian Ligue 1	8	0	0	0	2 (Note: Appearances in CAF Champions League)	1	–		10	1
Gil Vicente	2016–17	LigaPro	9	1	–		–		–		9	1
Ilves	2017	Veikkausliiga	12	3	–		–		–		12	3
Ilves	2018	Veikkausliiga	19	9	6	2	2 (Note: Appearances in UEFA Europa League)	1	–		27	12
Ilves	Total		31	12	6	2	2	1	-	-	39	15
Beerschot	2018–19	Belgian First Division B	26	12	2	1	–		–		28	13
Beerschot	2019–20	Belgian First Division B	26	5	2	1	–		–		28	6
Beerschot	2020–21	Belgian First Division A	16	4	0	0	–		–		16	4
Beerschot	2021–22	Belgian First Division A	21	4	1	1	–		–		22	5
Beerschot	Total		89	25	5	3	0	0	-	-	94	28
Valenciennes	2022–23	Ligue 2	18	2	3	0	–		–		21	2
Valenciennes	2023–24	Ligue 2	3	0	1	0	–		–		4	0
Valenciennes	Total		21	2	4	0	0	0	-	-	25	2
Valenciennes II	2022–23	National 3	3	2	–		–		–		3	2
Patro Eisden	2023–24	Challenger Pro League	13	5	–		–		–		13	5
Ararat-Armenia	2024–25	Armenian Premier League	26	18	5	2	0 (Note: Appearances and goals in the UEFA Conference League)	0	1	2	32	22
Pyunik	2025–26	Armenian Premier League	24	7	3	1	4	2	–		31	10
Career total			224	72	23	8	8	4	1	2	256	86
