= Dmitri Gunko =

Russian footballer and coach

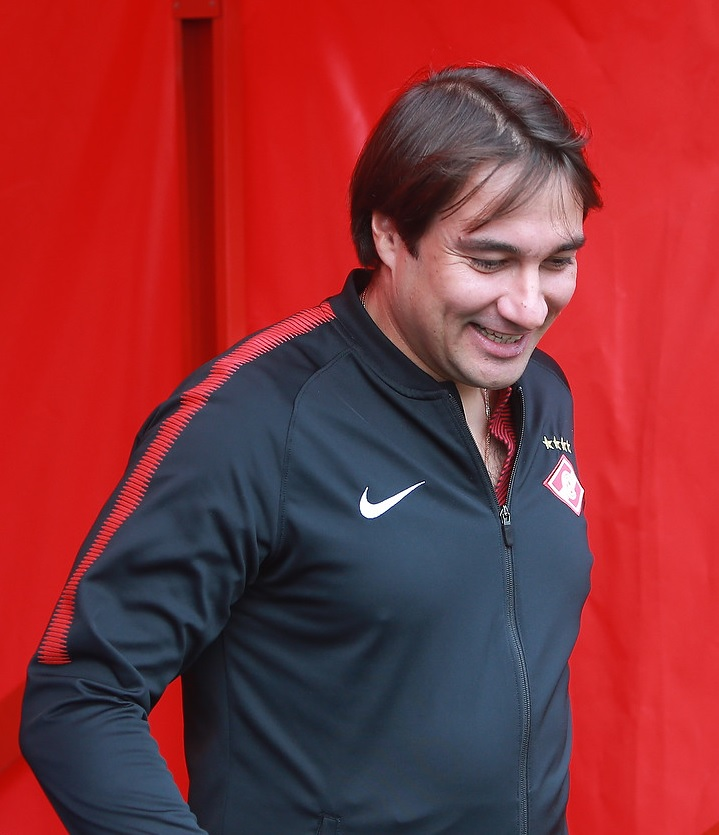
- Gunko coaching Spartak-2 in 2017

Personal information
- Full name: Dmitri Ivanovich Gunko
- Date of birth: 1 March 1976 (age 50)
- Place of birth: Moscow, Russian SFSR, Soviet Union
- Height: 1.85 m (6 ft 1 in)
- Position: Defender

Team information
- Current team: Pyunik (manager)

Youth career
- Spartak Moscow

Senior career*
Years	Team	Apps	(Gls)
1996–1998	Spartak-2 Moscow	70	(2)
1999	Tyumen	42	(0)
2000	Spartak-Chukotka Moscow	13	(0)
2001–2003	Arsenal Tula	71	(2)
2004–2005	Torpedo Vladimir	35	(0)
Total		231	(4)

Managerial career
- 2008: Spartak Moscow (youth asst)
- 2008–2012: Spartak Moscow (youth)
- 2013–2014: Spartak Moscow (assistant)
- 2014: Spartak Moscow (caretaker)
- 2014: Spartak Moscow
- 2016–2017: Spartak Moscow (U-21)
- 2017–2018: Spartak-2 Moscow
- 2020: Khimki
- 2020–2021: Noah
- 2021–2022: Ararat-Armenia
- 2022–2025: Urartu
- 2025–2026: Arsenal Tula
- 2026–: Pyunik
- * Club domestic league appearances and goals

Dmitri Ivanovich Gunko (Russian: Дми́трий Ива́нович Гунько́; born 1 March 1976) is a Russian professional football coach and a former player who is the manager of Armenian Premier League club Pyunik.

== Coaching career ==
He served as caretaker manager of Spartak Moscow to finish out the 2013–14 season after Valeri Karpin resigned on 18 March 2014.

On 1 August 2020, he was hired by Russian Premier League club Khimki. He left Khimki by mutual consent on 21 September 2020, after Khimki only gained 3 points in the first 8 games of the season.

On 5 November 2020, Gunko was appointed as head coach of Armenian Premier League club Noah.

On 14 June 2021, Gunko was appointed as head coach of Armenian Premier League club Ararat-Armenia. Following the conclusion of the 2021–22, Dmitri Gunko left his role as Head Coach after his contract was not extended.

On 27 June 2022, Urartu announced the appointment of Gunko as their new head coach.

On 18 June 2025, Gunko signed a contract with Russian First League club Arsenal Tula.

On 1 October 2026, Gunko was announced as the new head coach of Armenian Premier League club Pyunik.

== Personal life ==
His son Artemi Gunko is a professional footballer.

== Honours ==
=== As Coach ===
Urartu

- Armenian Premier League: 2022–23
- Armenian Cup: 2022–23

Ararat-Armenia

- Armenian Premier League: Runner-Up 2021–22

Noah

- Armenian Premier League: Runner-Up 2020–21
