= Christos Kountouriotis =

Greek footballer

Personal information
- Date of birth: 2 January 1998 (age 28)
- Place of birth: Athens, Greece
- Height: 1.82 m (6 ft 0 in)
- Position: Winger

Team information
- Current team: Kavala
- Number: 29

Senior career*
Years	Team	Apps	(Gls)
2017–2019	Panathinaikos	4	(0)
2019	→ Zemplín Michalovce (loan)	14	(0)
2019–2020	Zemplín Michalovce	28	(1)
2021	Košice	10	(2)
2021–2022	Olympiacos Volos	30	(5)
2022–2024	Iraklis	48	(3)
2024	Telavi	8	(0)
2025	Alashkert	9	(0)
2025–	Kavala	15	(0)
- * Club domestic league appearances and goals as of 20 April 2026

Christos Kountouriotis (Greek: Χρήστος Κουντουριώτης, born 2 January 1998) is a Greek professional footballer who plays as a winger for Super League 2 club Kavala.

== Career ==
Kountouriotis plays mainly as a winger, and joined Panathinaikos from the youth ranks of Panathinaikos. He made his first professional appearance for the team in the 2017–18 Super League game against Xanthi on 17 December 2017.
