= FC Khimik Vanadzor =

- Full name: Football Club Khimik Vanadzor
- Founded: 1950; 75 years ago
- Dissolved: 1993; 32 years ago
- Ground: Lori Stadium, Vanadzor
- Capacity: 5,000

FC Khimik Vanadzor (Armenian: Ֆուտբոլային Ակումբ Քիմիագործ Վանաձոր), is a defunct Armenian football club from the city of Vanadzor, Lori Province.

The club was founded in 1950, representing the Kirovakan chemicals plant. The team won the Armenian SSR championship in 1955 and 1964.

However, the club was dissolved in 1993, after the independence of Armenia.
