= Vadym Paramonov =

Ukrainian footballer

Personal information
- Full name: Vadym Mykolayovych Paramonov
- Date of birth: 18 March 1991 (age 35)
- Place of birth: Pavlohrad, Ukrainian SSR
- Height: 1.84 m (6 ft 1/2 in)
- Position: Defender

Youth career
- 2003–2004: Samara-Meteoryt Pavlohrad
- 2004–2005: Inter Dnipropetrovsk
- 2005–2006: ISTA Dnipropetrovsk
- 2006–2008: Inter Dnipropetrovsk

Senior career*
Years	Team	Apps	(Gls)
2008–2009	Dnipro-75 Dnipropetrovsk	4	(0)
2010–2013	Zorya Luhansk	0	(0)
2014–2018	Poltava	90	(3)
2018–2019	Lviv	25	(1)
2019–2020	Kolos Kovalivka	22	(1)
2020	Rukh Lviv	9	(0)
2021–2023	Urartu	49	(1)
2024	Alashkert	9	(0)
- * Club domestic league appearances and goals as of 6 August 2026

Vadym Paramonov (Ukrainian: Вадим Миколайович Парамонов; born 18 March 1991) is a Ukrainian former professional footballer who played as a defender.

== Career ==
Paramonov is a product of the Samara-Meteoryt academy system in his native Pavlohrad.

He spent his career in the Ukrainian Second League and Ukrainian First League, but in July 2018 signed a contract with the Ukrainian Premier League club FC Lviv.

He made his debut for FC Lviv in the Ukrainian Premier League in a winning match against FC Arsenal Kyiv on 22 July 2018.

On 16 February 2024, Alashkert announced the signing of Paramonov.

== Honours ==
Poltava

- Ukrainian First League: 2017–18

Urartu

- Armenian Premier League: 2022–23
- Armenian Cup: (1) 2022–23 Runner-up 2021–22
