= Zhirayr Margaryan =

Armenian footballer

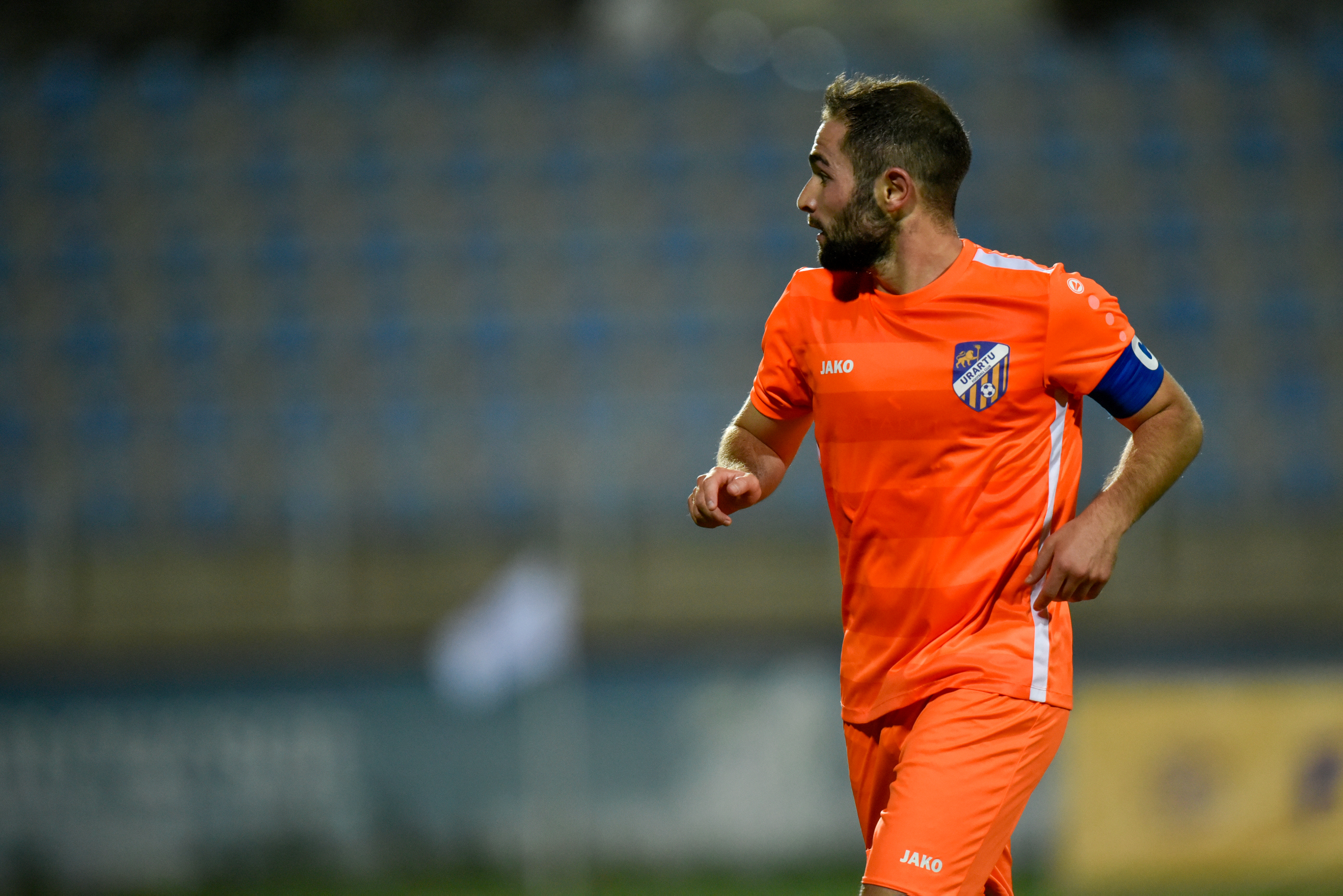

Personal information
- Date of birth: 13 September 1997 (age 29)
- Place of birth: Yerevan, Armenia
- Height: 1.76 m (5 ft 9 in)
- Position: Defender

Team information
- Current team: Urartu
- Number: 88

Youth career
- –2013: Banants

Senior career*
| Years | Team | Apps | (Gls) |
| 2013–2015 | Banants II | | |
| 2015–2018 | Banants | 10 | (0) |
| 2018–2020 | Shirak | 71 | (3) |
| 2020–2021 | Ararat Yerevan | 37 | (0) |
| 2020 | → Shirak (loan) | 0 | (0) |
| 2022–2023 | Veres Rivne | 0 | (0) |
| 2022–2023 | → Urartu (loan) | 44 | (3) |
| 2023– | Urartu | 83 | (3) |

International career^{‡}
| 2015 | Armenia U19 | 3 | (0) |
| 2017–2018 | Armenia U21 | 7 | (0) |
| 2021– | Armenia | 7 | (0) |
- * Club domestic league appearances and goals as of 18 June 2026 ‡ National team caps and goals as of 22 March 2024

Zhirayr Margaryan (Armenian: Ժիրայր Մարգարյան; born 13 September 1997) is an Armenian professional footballer who plays for Urartu.

== Career ==
=== Club ===
On 22 July 2022, Urartu announced the permanent signing of Margaryan on a one-year contract from Veres Rivne.

=== International ===
He made his debut for Armenia national football team on 11 November 2021 in a World Cup qualifier against North Macedonia.

== Honours ==
Ararat Yerevan

- Armenian Cup: 2020–21

Urartu

- Armenian Premier League: 2022–23
- Armenian Cup: 2022–23
- Armenian Cup: Runner-up 2021–22
