= Arsen Beglaryan =

Russian-Armenian footballer

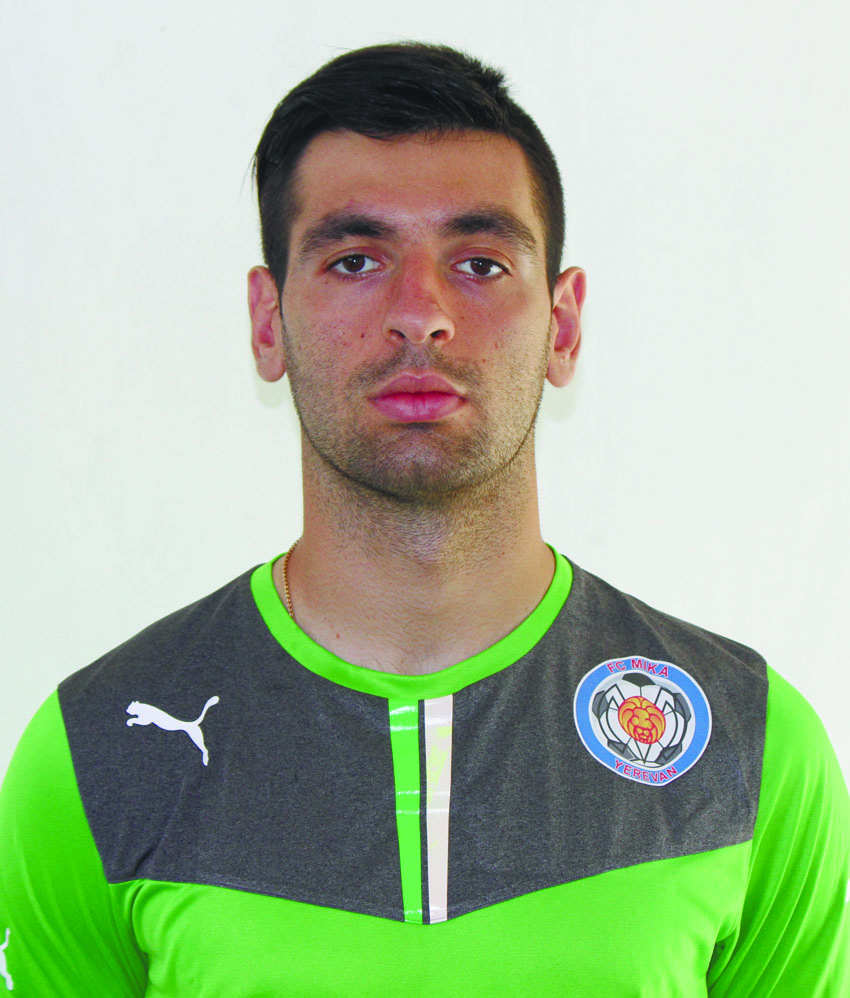
- Beglaryan with Mika

Personal information
- Full name: Arsen Abramovich Beglaryan
- Date of birth: 18 February 1993 (age 33)
- Place of birth: Krasnodar, Russia
- Height: 1.87 m (6 ft 2 in)
- Position: Goalkeeper

Team information
- Current team: Alashkert
- Number: 24

Youth career
- 2004–2008: Kuban Krasnodar
- 2008–2012: Krasnodar

Senior career*
Years	Team	Apps	(Gls)
2012–2014	Gandzasar Kapan	49	(0)
2014	Shirak	0	(0)
2014–2015	Ulisses	27	(0)
2015–2016	Mika	25	(0)
2016–2018	Alashkert	3	(0)
2018	Liepāja	15	(0)
2019	Dnyapro Mogilev	11	(0)
2020–2023	Urartu	61	(0)
2023–2024	Ararat-Armenia	28	(0)
2025	Van	11	(0)
2025–	Alashkert	27	(0)

International career^{‡}
2012–2014	Armenia U21	1	(0)
2016–	Armenia	19	(0)
- * Club domestic league appearances and goals as of 18 June 2026 ‡ National team caps and goals as of 5 October 2026

Arsen Abramovich Beglaryan (Armenian: Արսեն Բեգլարյան; Russian: Арсен Абрамович Бегларян; born 18 February 1993) is a professional footballer who plays as a goalkeeper for Alashkert. Born in Russia, he plays for the Armenia national team.

== Club career ==
Arsen Beglaryan was born in Krasnodar, Russia. He played goalkeeper for the youth teams of Kuban Krasnodar and Krasnodar during his early career.

Although he received many offers from Russian clubs, Beglaryan joined Armenian club Gandzasar Kapan on 1 January 2012, in order to get more practice. The contact with Gandzasar will expire on 30 June 2014. He was the second candidate from Gandzasar to be nominated for the Armenian Footballer of the Year award in 2012.

On 5 February 2020, FC Urartu announced the singing of Beglaryan.

In January 2025, Beglaryan joined Van

On 29 June 2025, Beglaryan moved to Alashkert, along with a group of other Van players.

== International career ==
Beglaryan was invited into the Armenia national football team in early September 2012. He debuted for the national team on 5 February 2013, in a friendly match against Luxembourg in Valence, France. His first start was for Armenia's friendlies in the United States against Guatemala and El Salvador. His first start in an official tournament was against Denmark on 4 September 2016. He saved a penalty from Christian Eriksen and a subsequent rebound.

== Career statistics ==
=== International ===
As of 5 October 2026

Armenia
Year	Apps	Goals
2016	8	0
2017	6	0
2023	1	0
2024	1	0
2025	1	0
2026	2	0
Total	19	0

== Honours ==
Urartu

- Armenian Premier League: 2022–23
- Armenian Cup: 2022–23

Alashkert

- Armenian Premier League: 2016–17, 2017–18
- Armenian Supercup: 2017

Ararat-Armenia

- Armenian Cup: 2023–24
