= 2022–23 Armenian Premier League =

Armenian Premier League
- Season: 2022–23
- Dates: 29 July 2022 – 6 June 2023
- Champions: Urartu
- Relegated: Lernayin Artsakh
- Champions League: Urartu
- Europa Conference League: Pyunik; Ararat-Armenia; Alashkert
- Matches: 180
- Goals: 446 (2.48 per match)
- Top goalscorer: Two Players (17)
- Biggest home win: Alashkert 5–0 Noah (10 October 2022)
- Biggest away win: Noah 0–6 Urartu (20 August 2022); Lernayin Artsakh 0–6 Pyunik (16 March 2023)
- Highest scoring: Noah 3–4 Alashkert (30 July 2022)
- Longest winning run: (14) Pyunik
- Longest unbeaten run: (18) Ararat-Armenia
- Longest winless run: (23) Lernayin Artsakh
- Longest losing run: (17) Lernayin Artsakh
- All statistics correct as of 6 June 2023.

The 2022–23 Armenian Premier League, known as the VBET Armenian Premier League (Armenian: VBET Հայաստանի Պրեմիեր Լիգա) for sponsorship reasons, is the 31st season of the league since its establishment.

== Season events ==
On 4 July 2022, the FFA announced that Lernayin Artsakh (promoted after a seventeen-year absence) would play in the upcoming Armenian Premier League season, along with Pyunik, Ararat-Armenia, Alashkert, Ararat Yerevan, Urartu, Noah, Van, BKMA Yerevan and Shirak.

== Teams ==
Locations of the teams

Club	Location	Stadium	Capacity
Alashkert	Yerevan (Shengavit)	Alashkert Stadium	6,850
Ararat Yerevan	Yerevan (Kentron)	Vazgen Sargsyan Republican Stadium	14,403
Ararat-Armenia	Yerevan (Avan)	Yerevan Football Academy Stadium^{1}	1,428
BKMA	Yerevan (Avan)	Yerevan Football Academy Stadium^{1}	1,428
Lernayin Artsakh	Vayk	Arevik Stadium	1,000
Noah	Armavir	Armavir City Stadium^{1}	3,100
Pyunik	Yerevan (Kentron)	Vazgen Sargsyan Republican Stadium	14,403
Shirak	Gyumri	Gyumri City Stadium	4,000
Urartu	Yerevan (Malatia-Sebastia)	Urartu Stadium	4,860
Van	Charentsavan	Charentsavan City Stadium	5,000

=== Personnel and sponsorship ===
Team	Manager	Captain	Kit manufacturer	Shirt sponsor
Alashkert	(Armenia) Vahe Gevorgyan	(Armenia) Artak Grigoryan	Sport-Saller	
Ararat Yerevan	(Armenia) Aleksandr Petrosyan	(Armenia) Hrayr Mkoyan	Fourteen	AWI International
Ararat-Armenia	(Armenia) Vardan Bichakhchyan	(Armenia) Armen Ambartsumyan	Puma	Tashir Group
BKMA	(Armenia) Rafael Nazaryan	(Armenia) Artur Grigoryan	Macron	
Noah	(Armenia) Robert Arzumanyan	(France) Haik Moussakhanian	Adidas	Fastex
Lernayin Artsakh	(Armenia) Artashes Adamyan	(Russia) Vladimir Kharatyan	Adidas	
Pyunik	(Armenia) Yegishe Melikyan	(Armenia) Edgar Malakyan	Joma	Fastex
Shirak	(Armenia) Edgar Torosyan	(Armenia) Artyom Mikaelyan	Fourteen	–
Urartu	(Russia) Dmitri Gunko	(Armenia) Zhirayr Margaryan	Jako	–
Van	(Armenia) Hayk Hovhannisyan	(Armenia) Vaspurak Minasyan	Puma	Fastex

=== Managerial changes ===
Team	Outgoing manager	Manner of departure	Date of vacancy	Position in table	Incoming manager	Date of appointment
Ararat-Armenia	Dmitri Gunko	End of contract	2 June 2022	Pre-season	Vardan Bichakhchyan	10 June 2022
Urartu	Robert Arzumanyan	End of contract	24 June 2022	Pre-season	Dmitri Gunko	27 June 2022
Noah	Aram Hakobyan			10th	Robert Arzumanyan	23 August 2022
Ararat Yerevan	Aram Voskanyan	Resigned	4 October 2022	7th	Rafael Safaryan	4 October 2022
Ararat Yerevan	Rafael Safaryan		15 October 2022	7th	Gagik Simonyan	16 October 2022
Ararat Yerevan	Gagik Simonyan		28 October 2022	7th	Aleksandr Petrosyan	29 October 2022
Alashkert	Karen Barseghyan			4th	Vahe Gevorgyan	24 December 2022
Van	Artur Asoyan			5th	Humberto Viviani	14 January 2023
Shirak	Tigran Davtyan		1 April 2023	6th	Edgar Torosyan	1 April 2023
Van	Humberto Viviani	3 May 2023		5th	Hayk Hovhannisyan	4 May 2023

== League table ==
Pos	Team	Pld	W	D	L	GF	GA	GD	Pts	Qualification or relegation
1	Urartu (C)	36	26	5	5	68	25	+43	83	Qualification for the Champions League first qualifying round
2	Pyunik	36	25	5	6	72	23	+49	80	Qualification for the Europa Conference League first qualifying round (Note: The 2022–23 Armenian Cup winners qualified for the Europa Conference League first qualifying round. Since the cup winners (Urartu) qualified based on league position, the Europa Conference League spot was passed to the fourth-placed team.)
3	Ararat-Armenia	36	23	7	6	70	27	+43	76	Qualification for the Europa Conference League first qualifying round
4	Alashkert	36	20	6	10	58	37	+21	66	Qualification for the Europa Conference League first qualifying round
5	Van	36	11	7	18	38	59	−21	40	
6	Ararat Yerevan	36	10	8	18	29	42	−13	38	
7	Shirak	36	10	6	20	25	55	−30	36	
8	Noah	36	8	8	20	34	66	−32	32 (Note: Games won: Noah 8, BKMA 7.)	
9	BKMA	36	7	11	18	36	53	−17	32	
10	Lernayin Artsakh (R)	36	5	7	24	16	59	−43	22	Relegation to the Armenian First League

Source: FFA Soccerway
Rules for classification: 1) Points; 2) Head-to-head points; 3) Head-to-head goal difference; 4) Head-to-head goals scored; 5) Matches won; 6) Goal difference; 7) Less red cards; 8) Less yellow cards; 9) Fair-play ranking 10) Draw
(C) Champions; (R) Relegated

== Fixtures and results ==
=== Round 1–18 ===
Home \ Away	ALA	ARA	AAR	BKM	LER	NOA	PYU	SHI	URA	VAN
Alashkert	—	2–0	1–1	1–0	2–1	5–0	1–2	3–0	0–0	0–0
Ararat Yerevan	0–1	—	0–2	0–0	0–0	2–1	1–0	0–1	0–2	1–0
Ararat-Armenia	4–1	2–1	—	1–0	1–0	3–0	0–0	3–0	0–1	4–0
BKMA	2–4	2–1	2–2	—	0–1	2–2	1–1	0–1	1–4	0–3
Lernayin Artsakh	0–1	2–1	0–1	1–1	—	0–0	1–1	0–0	1–2	0–1
Noah	3–4	0–0	1–2	0–0	0–1	—	0–1	1–3	0–6	2–2
Pyunik	5–1	2–1	0–1	3–1	1–0	3–0	—	1–0	0–3	0–1
Shirak	0–2	0–0	0–5	1–0	1–2	2–0	0–1	—	0–2	1–1
Urartu	1–1	2–1	1–0	1–0	2–3	3–1	2–1	1–0	—	0–1
Van	1–0	0–2	0–4	2–2	1–1	2–2	0–3	2–1	0–1	—

Source: Soccerway
Legend: Blue = home team win; Yellow = draw; Red = away team win.

=== Round 19–36 ===
Home \ Away	ALA	ARA	AAR	BKM	LER	NOA	PYU	SHI	URA	VAN
Alashkert	—	0–1	0–0	1–2	1–0	3–0	1–2	3–0	3–2	3–1
Ararat Yerevan	2–4	—	1–3	1–1	2–0	1–0	0–2	1–2	0–0	1–3
Ararat-Armenia	0–1	2–1	—	2–1	0–0	3–0	1–1	1–0	2–2	4–1
BKMA	1–1	0–1	2–5	—	2–1	0–1	1–1	0–1	0–2	5–1
Lernayin Artsakh	1–3	0–3	0–2	0–3	—	0–2	0–6	0–1	0–4	0–2
Noah	3–2	2–1	2–1	1–2	2–0	—	1–3	3–3	0–2	1–0
Pyunik	1–0	2–0	4–1	3–0	2–0	2–0	—	4–1	0–1	4–0
Shirak	0–1	0–0	0–2	1–1	1–0	0–2	0–4	—	2–3	1–0
Urartu	1–0	1–1	0–3	1–0	3–0	1–0	1–3	3–1	—	2–0
Van	0–1	3–1	1–2	0–1	4–0	1–1	1–3	3–0	0–5	—

Source: Soccerway
Legend: Blue = home team win; Yellow = draw; Red = away team win.

== Season statistics ==
=== Top scorers ===
As of match played 6 June 2023

Rank	Player	Club	Goals
1	(Bosnia and Herzegovina) Luka Juričić	Pyunik	17
1	(Nigeria) Yusuf Otubanjo	Pyunik	17
3	(Ivory Coast) Wilfried Eza	Ararat-Armenia	13
4	(Colombia) Bladimir Díaz	Alashkert	11
5	(Nigeria) Tenton Yenne	Ararat-Armenia	10
5	(Armenia) Artak Yedigaryan	Alashkert	10
7	(Portugal) Hugo Firmino	Ararat-Armenia	9
7	(Ukraine) Dmytro Khlyobas	Urartu	9
7	(Armenia) Edgar Movsesyan	Van	9
7	(Brazil) Thiago Galvão	Alashkert	9

=== Hat-tricks ===
Player	For	Against	Result	Date	Ref
(Ukraine) Dmytro Khlyobas	Urartu	Noah	0–6 (A)	20 August 2022	
(Russia) Maksim Mayrovich	Urartu	BKMA Yerevan	1–4 (A)	4 September 2022	
(Kazakhstan) Danil Ankudinov	Van	Lernayin Artsakh	4–0 (H)	21 April 2023	
(Bosnia and Herzegovina) Luka Juričić	Pyunik	Ararat-Armenia	4–1 (H)	27 April 2023	

=== Clean sheets ===
As of match played 6 June 2023

Rank	Player	Club	Clean sheets
1	(Russia) Vsevolod Ermakov	Ararat-Armenia	17
2	(Serbia) Ognjen Čančarević	Alashkert	14
3	(Russia) Aleksandr Melikhov	Urartu	13
4	(Armenia) Stanislav Buchnev	Pyunik	12
5	(Armenia) Arsen Beglaryan	Urartu	8
6	(Russia) Artyom Potapov	Ararat Yerevan	7
7	(Russia) Samur Agamagomedov	Van	6
7	(Armenia) Lyova Karapetyan	Shirak	6
9	(Russia) Vyacheslav Grigoryan	Lernayin Artsakh	5
10	(Armenia) Henri Avagyan	BKMA Yerevan/Pyunik	4
10	(Russia) Sergei Revyakin	Ararat Yerevan	4
