= FC BKMA Yerevan =

Armenian football club

BKMA Yerevan
- Full name: Բանակի Կենտրոնական Մարզական Ակումբ Երևան (Central Sport Club of the Army, Yerevan)
- Founded: 1947; 79 years ago
- Ground: Yerevan Football Academy Stadium
- Capacity: 1,428
- Owner: Ministry of Defence of Armenia
- Director: Gagik Aghbalyan
- Manager: Armen Gyulbudaghyants
- League: Armenian Premier League
- 2025–26: Armenian Premier League, 7th
Home colours	Away colours

FC BKMA Yerevan (Armenian: ԲԿՄԱ Երևան or Armenian: Բանակի Կենտրոնական Մարզական Ակումբ Երևան; Banaki Kentronakan Marzakan Akumb Yerevan; lit. 'Central Sport Club of the Army Yerevan') is an Armenian professional football club based in Yerevan.

== History ==
During the days of the Soviet rule in Armenia, the Central Sport Club of the Army Yerevan was founded in 1947 in Yerevan. It was commonly known with its Russian abbreviation as CSKA Yerevan.

After the independence of Armenia in 1991, the BKMA made their professional debut in domestic football competitions in the 1994 Armenian First League where they finished 3rd.

In the 1995–96 Armenian First League season, they finished 2nd behind FC Arabkir, to get the opportunity to face Aragats Gyumri in the promotion play-off match in which they beat the Armenian Premier League side and were promoted for the following season. Halfway through the 1997 season, BKMA were folded and all their remaining matches were awarded 3–0 to their opponents, resulting in the 12th and last position and relegation. The club has been inactive ever since.

In 2019, BKMA was revived by the efforts of the Defence minister of Armenia David Tonoyan. The club was revived with the goal of helping young Armenian players to develop their football skills during their military service, in particular those serving their mandatory military service. The head coach of the team is Rafael Nazaryan, assisted by Varazdat Avetisyan.

BKMA played their first season in the Armenian First League in 2019-20, and was promoted to the Armenian Premier League after finishing second the next year. Since promotion, BKMA have never been relegated, though partially due to other teams folding.

A reserve team, BKMA-2, was founded in 2021, the same year BKMA was promoted to the Armenian Premier League. BKMA-2 won the 2024-25 Armenian First League but were not promoted.

== Squad ==
As of 1 March 2026

Note: Flags indicate national team as defined under FIFA eligibility rules; some limited exceptions apply. Players may hold more than one non-FIFA nationality.

No.	Pos.	Nation	Player
3	DF	ARM	Gor Arakelyan
4	DF	ARM	Mark Avetisyan
5	DF	ARM	Petik Manukyan
6	DF	ARM	Argishti Petrosyan (captain)
7	FW	ARM	Narek Hovhannisyan
9	MF	ARM	Michel Ayvazyan (on loan from Ararat-Armenia)
10	FW	ARM	Grenik Petrosyan
11	FW	ARM	David Harutyunyan (on loan from Urartu)
13	MF	ARM	Hamlet Sargsyan (on loan from Urartu)
14	DF	ARM	Poghos Krmzyan
17	DF	ARM	Ruben Abrahamyan

No.	Pos.	Nation	Player
19	MF	ARM	Aleks Galstyan (on loan from Van)
22	DF	ARM	Andranik Hakobyan (on loan from Deportivo Alavés C)
23	FW	ARM	Arshak Petrosyan
29	MF	ARM	Artur Askaryan
35	MF	ARM	Petros Alekyan
47	MF	ARM	Harutyun Manukyan
49	DF	ARM	Alyosha Khachatryan
51	FW	ARM	Suren Kirakosyan
55	DF	ARM	Artur Movesyan (on loan from Noah)
77	GK	ARM	Davit Davtyan
91	GK	ARM	Hayk Ghazaryan (on loan from Urartu)

== See also ==
- Football in Armenia
- Football Federation of Armenia
