= Armenian Cup =

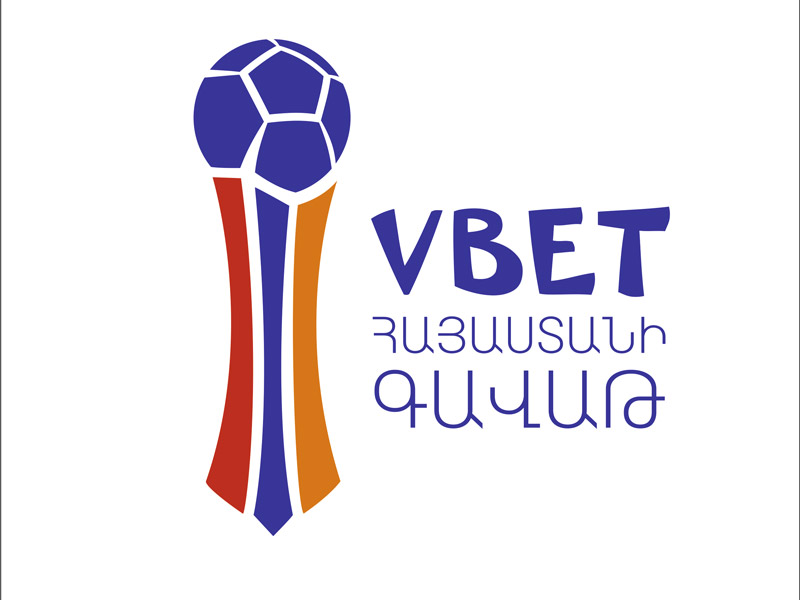
- Founded: 1992; 34 years ago
- Region: Armenia
- Teams: 20
- Qualifier for: UEFA Conference League
- Domestic cup: Armenian Supercup
- Current champions: Noah (3rd title)
- Most championships: Pyunik (8 titles)
- Website: www.ffa.am
- 2026–27 Armenian Cup

The Armenian Cup (Armenian: Հայաստանի Անկախության Գավաթ) is the main football cup competition of Armenia. In its original form as the Armenian Cup, it started in 1939, when Armenia was a republic of the Soviet Union. It served as a qualification tournament for the Soviet Cup, and it was not disputed by Armenian teams in the Soviet League pyramid. After Armenia gained independence in 1992, the cup became known as Independence Cup, and the final is held every year on 9 May.

Since 2022, it has been known as the Fastex Armenian Cup after its headline sponsor.

== Finals ==
=== Soviet ===
- 1939 Dinamo Leninakan
- 1940 Dinamo Yerevan
- 1941–44 not played
- 1945 Dinamo Yerevan
- 1946 Dinamo Yerevan
- 1947 not played
- 1948 DO Yerevan
- 1949 DO Yerevan
- 1950 Karmir Drosh Leninakan
- 1951 Karmir Drosh Leninakan
- 1952 Shinarar Yerevan
- 1953 Himik Kirovokan
- 1954 Himik Kirovokan
- 1955 Karmir Drosh Leninakan
- 1956 FIMA Yerevan
- 1957 FIMA Yerevan
- 1958 Tekstilschik Leninakan
- 1959 Tekstilschik Leninakan
- 1960 Shinarar Yerevan
- 1961 Himik Kirovokan
- 1962 Motor Yerevan
- 1963 Lernagorts Kapan
- 1964 Aeroflot Yerevan
- 1965 Motor Yerevan
- 1966 Himik Yerevan
- 1967 Elektrotehnik Yerevan
- 1968 Araks Yerevan
- 1969 Motor Yerevan
- 1970 Motor Yerevan
- 1971 FIMA Yerevan
- 1972 FIMA Yerevan
- 1973 Aragats Leninakan
- 1974 FIMA Yerevan
- 1975 Kotayk Abovyan
- 1976 Kotayk Abovyan
- 1977 Kotayk Abovyan
- 1978 Kanaz Yerevan
- 1979 FIMA Yerevan
- 1980 Metroschin Yerevan
- 1981 MBVD Yerevan
- 1982 Metroschin Yerevan
- 1983 FIMA Yerevan
- 1984 Motor Yerevan
- 1985 Impuls Dilijan
- 1986 Schweinik Spitak
- 1987 Iskra Yerevan
- 1988 Kumairi Leninakan
- 1989 Almast Yerevan
- 1990 not known
- 1991 not known

=== Armenian ===
Armenian Cup winners
Season	Winners	Score	Runners–up	Venue	Attendance
1992	Banants	2–0	Homenetmen	Hrazdan Stadium	3,347
1993	Ararat Yerevan	3–1	Shirak	Hrazdan Stadium	7,000
1994	Ararat Yerevan	1–0	Shirak	Hrazdan Stadium	10,000
1995	Ararat Yerevan	4–2	Kotayk	Hrazdan Stadium	1,000
1996	Pyunik	3–2	Kotayk	Hrazdan Stadium	3,000
1997	Ararat Yerevan	1–0	Pyunik	Hrazdan Stadium	4,500
1998	Tsement Ararat	3–1	Yerevan	Hrazdan Stadium	4,000
1999	Tsement Ararat	3–2	Shirak	Hrazdan Stadium	4,000
2000	Mika	2–1	Zvartnots-AAL	Kotayk Stadium	4,500
2001	Mika	1–1 (4–3 p)	Ararat Yerevan	Republican Stadium	7,500
2002	Pyunik	2–0	Zvartnots-AAL	Republican Stadium	8,000
2003	Mika	1–0	Banants	Republican Stadium	5,000
2004	Pyunik	0–0 (6–5 p)	Banants	Republican Stadium	10,000
2005	Mika	2–0	Kilikia	Republican Stadium	6,000
2006	Mika	1–0	Pyunik	Republican Stadium	1,400
2007	Banants	3–1 (a.e.t.)	Ararat Yerevan	Republican Stadium	6,000
2008	Ararat Yerevan	2–1 (a.e.t.)	Banants	Arnar Stadium	2,500
2009	Pyunik	1–0	Banants	Republican Stadium	7,500
2010	Pyunik	4–0	Banants	Republican Stadium	8,000
2011	Mika	4–1	Shirak	Republican Stadium	9,300
2011–12	Shirak	1–0	Impuls	Gyumri City Stadium	3,000
2012–13	Pyunik	1–0	Shirak	Hrazdan Stadium	2,500
2013–14	Pyunik	2–1	Gandzasar Kapan	Hrazdan Stadium	5,000
2014–15	Pyunik	3–1	Mika	Republican Stadium	5,000
2015–16	Banants	2–0	Mika	Republican Stadium	3,000
2016–17	Shirak	3–0	Pyunik	Republican Stadium	2,000
2017–18	Gandzasar Kapan	1–1 (4–3 p)	Alashkert	Republican Stadium	1,000
2018–19	Alashkert	1–0	Lori	Banants Stadium	4,000
2019–20	Noah	5–5 (7–6 p)	Ararat-Armenia	Football Academy Stadium	0 (Note: Match played behind closed doors due to the COVID-19 pandemic in Armenia.)
2020–21	Ararat Yerevan	3–1	Alashkert	Republican Stadium	4,000
2021–22	Noravank	2–0	Urartu	Republican Stadium	-
2022–23	Urartu	2–1	Shirak	Republican Stadium	-
2023–24	Ararat-Armenia	1–1 (5–3 p)	Urartu	Republican Stadium	-
2024–25	Noah	3–1	Ararat-Armenia	Republican Stadium	-
2025–26	Noah	4–2	Urartu	Republican Stadium	-

== Winners and finalists ==
=== Results by team ===
Since its establishment, the Armenian Cup has been won by 11 different teams. Teams shown in italics are no longer in existence.

Results by team
Club	Wins	First final won	Last final won	Runners-up	Last final lost	Total final appearances
Pyunik (Note: Pyunik's total includes one defeat under the earlier name of Homenetmen.)	8	1996	2015	4	2017	12
Mika	6	2000	2011	2	2016	8
Ararat Yerevan	6	1993	2021	2	2007	8
Urartu (Note: Urartu's total includes three wins and five defeats under the earlier name of Banants.)	4	1992	2023	8	2026	12
Noah	3	2020	2026	0	—	3
Shirak	2	2012	2017	6	2023	8
Araks Ararat (Note: As Tsement Ararat.)	2	1998	1999	0	—	2
Alashkert	1	2019	2019	2	2021	3
Ararat-Armenia	1	2024	2024	2	2025	3
Gandzasar Kapan	1	2018	2018	1	2014	2
Noravank	1	2022	2022	0	—	1
Kotayk	0			2	1996	2
Zvartnots-AAL	0			2	2002	2
Yerevan	0			1	1998	1
Kilikia	0			1	2005	1
Impuls	0			1	2012	1
Lori	0			1	2019	1

=== Consecutive winners ===
Two clubs have won consecutive Armenian Cups on more than one occasion: Ararat Yerevan (1993, 1994, 1995) and Pyunik (2013, 2014, 2015), .

== See also ==
- List of football clubs in Armenia
- Sports in Armenia
