= 2024–25 FC Ararat Yerevan season =

Ararat Yerevan
2024–25 season
- President: Hrach Kaprielian
- Manager: Tigran Yesayan
- Stadium: Republican Stadium
- Premier League: 8th
- Armenian Cup: Second round
- Top goalscorer: League: Hyllarion Goore (6); Moussa Kante {6); All: Hyllarion Goore (6); Moussa Kante {6)
Home colours	Away colours	Third colours

The 2024–25 season was FC Ararat Yerevan's 34th consecutive season in the Armenian Premier League, where they also competed in the Armenian Cup.

== Season overview ==
On 30 January, Ararat announced that Hyllarion Goore had been sold by the club to Belgian Pro League club Gent.

On 9 February, Ararat announced the singing of free-agent Marvin Evouna.

On 15 February, Ararat announced the singings of Amadou Diakite and Alseny Toure from Wakriya.

On 17 February, Ararat announced the singing of James Johna from Right2Win SA.

On 23 February, Ararat announced the singing of Marc Tsoungui from Stade Lausanne Ouchy.

On 28 February, Ararat announced the singing of Keasse Bah from SOA.

== Squad ==
As of match played 28 May 2025

Number	Name	Nationality	Position	Date of birth (age)	Signed from	Signed in	Contract ends	Apps.	Goals
Goalkeepers
13	Poghos Ayvazyan	(Armenia)	GK	9 June 1995 (aged 29)	Lernayin Artsakh	2024		8	0
71	Andranik Martirosyan	(Armenia)	GK	1 January 2003 (aged 22)	Tigranakert	2024		6	0
82	Tiago Gomes	(Brazil)	GK	20 January 2003 (aged 22)	Bahia	2024		33	0
Defenders
3	Albert Khachumyan	(Armenia)	DF	23 June 1999 (aged 25)	Ararat-Armenia	2024		39	1
4	Volodya Samsonyan	(Armenia)	DF	24 February 2001 (aged 24)	BKMA Yerevan	2023		50	0
12	Clinton Dombila	(Ghana)	DF	10 February 2005 (aged 20)	JMG Academy	2023		38	0
18	Malick Berte	(Mali)	DF	24 February 2004 (aged 21)	Guidars	2023		40	0
54	Marcelo	(Brazil)	DF	7 April 2003 (aged 22)	Serra Macaense	2024		14	0
92	Marvin Evouna	(France)	DF	6 April 2001 (aged 24)	Unattached	2025		6	0
Midfielders
5	Rayane Mzoughi	(Tunisia)	MF	8 January 2000 (aged 25)	AS Gabès	2023		40	1
6	Alassane Faye	(Senegal)	MF	28 September 2003 (aged 21)	Casa Sports	2023		56	1
8	Christopher Boniface	(Nigeria)	MF	1 January 2002 (aged 23)	Van	2024		13	3
9	Gor Lulukyan	(Armenia)	MF	2 January 2003 (aged 22)	Urartu	2024		23	1
11	Armen Nahapetyan	(Armenia)	MF	24 July 1999 (aged 25)	Ararat-Armenia	2023		33	4
20	Moussa Kante	(Senegal)	MF	8 May 2004 (aged 21)	Olympique Lyonnais	2024		23	6
21	Serob Galstyan	(Armenia)	MF	23 September 2002 (aged 22)	Torpedo Yerevan	2020	2025	87	6
23	Gor Malakyan	(Armenia)	MF	12 June 1994 (aged 30)	Pyunik	2021		116	4
27	Alen Vardanyan	(Armenia)	MF	26 December 2006 (aged 18)	Academy	2023		1	0
28	Gagik Simonyan	(Armenia)	MF	8 March 2006 (aged 19)	Academy	2023		7	0
30	Aram Aslanyan	(Armenia)	MF	17 March 2005 (aged 20)	Academy	2023		5	0
33	Gor Ghukasyan	(Armenia)	MF	25 October 2005 (aged 19)	Urartu	2023		1	0
38	Moussa Kante	(Ivory Coast)	MF	19 August 2005 (aged 19)	Bokakokore Academy	2024		14	1
63	Marc Tsoungui	(Switzerland)	MF	30 July 2002 (aged 22)	Stade Lausanne Ouchy	2025		9	0
64	Alseny Toure	(Guinea)	MF	14 May 2006 (aged 19)	Wakriya	2025		5	0
70	Alen Mkrtchyan	(Armenia)	MF	17 August 2006 (aged 18)	Academy	2023		6	0
77	Aleksandr Aleksanyan	(Armenia)	MF	14 November 2006 (aged 18)	Academy	2023		12	0
Forwards
14	Badem Diabira	(Mali)	FW	7 December 2004 (aged 20)	Guidars	2024		6	0
15	Kalifala Doumbia	(Mali)	FW	28 September 2004 (aged 20)	Guidars	2023		38	6
17	Amadou Diakite	(Guinea)	FW	24 January 2005 (aged 20)	Wakriya	2025		3	0
19	James Johna	(Nigeria)	FW	26 December 2001 (aged 23)	Right2Win SA	2025		7	1
39	Keasse Bah	(Ivory Coast)	FW	17 December 2004 (aged 20)	SOA	2025		12	4
Players away on loan
24	Hadji Issa Moustapha	(Cameroon)	DF	4 December 2003 (aged 21)	Gazelle FA de Garoua	2023		43	4
91	Suren Kirakosyan	(Armenia)	MF	23 December 2006 (aged 18)	Alashkert	2023		0	0
Players who left during the season
10	Artur Grigoryan	(Armenia)	MF	10 July 1993 (aged 31)	BKMA Yerevan	2024		34	1
34	Sandro Trémoulet	(Madagascar)	DF	18 November 1999 (aged 25)	RFC Seraing	2024		8	0
45	Hyllarion Goore	(Ivory Coast)	FW	24 August 2005 (aged 19)	Bokakokore Academy	2024		15	6
81	Kassim Hadji	(Comoros)	MF	23 March 2000 (aged 25)	Stade Nyonnais	2023		64	11

== Transfers ==
=== In ===
Date	Position	Nationality	Name	From	Fee	Ref.
9 February 2025	DF	(France)	Marvin Evouna	Unattached	Free	
15 February 2025	MF	(Guinea)	Alseny Toure	Wakriya	Undisclosed	
15 February 2025	FW	(Guinea)	Amadou Diakite	Wakriya	Undisclosed	
17 February 2025	FW	(Nigeria)	James Johna	Right2Win SA	Undisclosed	
23 February 2025	MF	(Switzerland)	Marc Tsoungui	Stade Lausanne Ouchy	Undisclosed	
28 February 2025	FW	(Ivory Coast)	Keasse Bah	SOA	Undisclosed	

=== Out ===
Date	Position	Nationality	Name	To	Fee	Ref.
21 January 2025	MF	(Armenia)	Michael Ayvazyan	Alashkert	Undisclosed	
30 January 2025	FW	(Ivory Coast)	Hyllarion Goore	Gent	Undisclosed	
4 February 2025	MF	(Comoros)	Kassim Hadji	Žalgiris	Undisclosed	

=== Loans out ===
Start date	Position	Nationality	Name	To	End date	Ref.
13 February 2025	MF	(Armenia)	Suren Kirakosyan	BKMA Yerevan	30 June 2025	

=== Released ===
Date	Position	Nationality	Name	Joined	Date	Ref
8 January 2025	MF	(Armenia)	Artur Grigoryan	Pyunik	19 January 2025	
18 January 2025	DF	(Madagascar)	Sandro Trémoulet	Radnik Surdulica		
10 June 2025	MF	(Armenia)	Armen Nahapetyan	Hayk		
10 June 2025	MF	(Armenia)	Serob Galstyan	Pyunik		
10 June 2025	MF	(Tunisia)	Rayane Mzoughi	Panevėžys	29 December 2025	
10 June 2025	FW	(Mali)	Badem Diabira			
28 June 2025	FW	(Ivory Coast)	Keasse Bah	Stade Lausanne Ouchy		

== Competitions ==
=== Overview ===
Competition	First match	Last match	Starting round	Final position	Record							
Competition	First match	Last match	Starting round	Final position	Pld	W	D	L	GF	GA	GD	Win %
Premier League	3 August 2024	28 May 2025	Matchday 1	8th	30	9	5	16	36	59	−23	30.00
Armenian Cup	2 October 2024	2 October 2024	Second Round	Second Round	1	0	1	0	1	1	+0	0.00
Total					31	9	6	16	37	60	−23	29.03

Last updated: 28 May 2025
Source: Competitions

=== Premier League ===
==== Results summary ====
Overall								Home						Away					
Pld	W	D	L	GF	GA	GD	Pts	W	D	L	GF	GA	GD	W	D	L	GF	GA	GD
30	9	5	16	36	59	−23	32	4	4	7	19	25	−6	5	1	9	17	34	−17

Last updated: 28 May 2025.
Source: See Results

==== Results by round ====
Round	1	2	3	4	5	6	7	8	9	10	11	12	13	14	15	16	17	18	19	20	21	22	23	24	25	26	27	28	29	30	31	32	33
Ground	H	A	H	A	H	H	-	A	H	A	H	-	A	H	A	H	A	A	H	A	A	H	H	H	A	A	H	A	-	H	A	H	A
Result	W	W	L	W	D	W	P	L	L	L	L	P	L	L	L	D	L	D	L	W	W	D	D	L	W	L	W	L	P	W	L	L	L
Position	3	2	2	2	5	5	6	6	6	6	7	7	7	8	8	8	8	8	9	8	7	7	6	6	7	7	6	7	7	7	7	7	8

Updated to match(es) played on 28 May 2025. Source: See Results
A = Away; H = Home; W = Win; D = Draw; L = Loss

==== Results ====
3 August 2024 1	Ararat Yerevan	2–0	Alashkert	Yerevan
19:00 (UTC+4)	Hadji 45'; Goore 72'	Report	Vimercati (yellow card) 80'	Stadium: Republican Stadium; Referee: David Mkrtchyan

10 August 2024 2	Gandzasar Kapan	0–2	Ararat Yerevan	Yerevan
19:00 (UTC+4)	Mani (yellow card) 33'; Opoku (yellow card) 65'	Report	Dombila (yellow card) 48'; Nahapetyan 68' (pen.); Kante (yellow card) 82'; Goore 89'	Stadium: Junior Sport Stadium; Referee: Zaven Hovhannisyan

17 August 2024 3	Ararat Yerevan	1–2	Shirak	Yerevan
18:00 (UTC+4)	Malakyan (yellow card) 57'; Kante (yellow card) 74' (goal) 90+6' (pen.)	Report	Kone 18' (pen.), 53'; Urushanyan (yellow card) 33'; Misakyan (yellow card) 35'; L.Darbinyan (yellow card) 86'	Stadium: Republican Stadium; Referee: Yura Mahtesyan

24 August 2024 4	West Armenia	1–2	Ararat Yerevan	Yerevan
17:00 (UTC+4)	Aventisian (red card) 14'; A.Sargsyan (yellow card) 56'; Rudoselsky (yellow card) 71'; Yusuf (yellow card) 73'; Yeghiazaryan 90+10'	Report	Malakyan (yellow card) 45'; Kante (yellow card) 56' (goal) 90+6'; Galstyan 80'; Dombila (yellow card) 90+5'	Stadium: Junior Sports Stadium; Referee: Ashot Ghaltakhchyan

30 August 2024 5	Ararat Yerevan	2–2	BKMA Yerevan	Yerevan
17:00 (UTC+4)	Kante 9' (pen.); Mzoughi 28'	Report	N.Hovhannisyan 23'; Khamoyan (yellow card) 45'; Abrahamyan (yellow card) 71'; Eloyan 88' (pen.)	Stadium: Republican Stadium

15 September 2024 6	Ararat Yerevan	2–1	Noah	Yerevan
19:00 (UTC+4)	Goore 79'; Kante 90+1'; Hadji (yellow card) 90+7'	Report	Pinson (yellow card) 29'; Ferreira 47'; Miljković (yellow card) 69'; Eteki (yellow card) 71' (yellow-red card) 74'	Stadium: Republican Stadium; Referee: Artem Gasparyan

7	Bye
(UTC+4)

23 September 2024 8	Ararat Yerevan	0–3	Van	Yerevan
17:00 (UTC+4)	Khachumyan (yellow card) 36'; Trémoulet (yellow card) 68'; Malakyan (yellow card) 79'	Report	Gareginyan (yellow card) 15'; Touré 21', 57'; Nalbandyan 45'; Klaidher (yellow card) 65'	Stadium: Republican Stadium; Referee: Hovhannes Kalantaryan

28 September 2024 9	Pyunik	3–0	Ararat Yerevan	Yerevan
18:00 (UTC+4)	Buhari 26'; Grigoryan (yellow card) 35'; Déblé 45+3' (pen.); Otubanjo 71'	Report	Malakyan (yellow card) 29'; Goore (yellow card) 37'	Stadium: Junior Sports Stadium; Referee: Yura Mahtesyan

6 October 2024 10	Ararat Yerevan	0–1	Urartu	Abovyan
15:00 (UTC+4)	Marcelo (yellow card) 30'; Kante (yellow card) 52'; Diabira (yellow card) 57'; Goore (yellow card) 68'	Report	Margaryan (yellow card) 31' (yellow-red card) 83'; Polyakov (yellow card) 36'; Abou (yellow card) 45'; Ignatyev 60' (pen.); Gilmore (yellow card) 66'; Putsko (yellow card) 74'; S.Mkrtchyan (yellow card) 90+6'	Stadium: City Stadium; Referee: Henrik Nalbandian

18 October 2024 11	Ararat-Armenia	3–2	Ararat Yerevan	Yerevan
18:00 (UTC+4)	Noubissi 19' (pen.), 50', 90+9'; Muradyan (yellow card) 23'; Pavlovets (yellow card) 42'; Queirós (yellow card) 57'	Report	Galstyan 22'; Kante (yellow card) 53'; Kante 65' (pen.); Gomes (yellow card) 85'; Dombila (yellow card) 90+9'	Stadium: Yerevan Football Academy Stadium; Referee: Hovhannes Kalantaryan

12	Bye
(UTC+4)

26 October 2024 13	Urartu	1–0	Ararat Yerevan	Yerevan
16:00 (UTC+4)	Simonyan 35'	Report	Hadji (yellow card) 50'; Nahapetyan (yellow card) 89'; Dombila (yellow card) 90+6'	Stadium: Urartu Stadium; Referee: Zaven Hovhannisyan

2 November 2024 14	Ararat Yerevan	0–2	Pyunik	Yerevan
17:00 (UTC+4)	Faye (yellow card) 50'; Dombila (yellow card) 90+1'	Report	Otubanjo 28'; Alceus (yellow card) 71'; Déblé 81'; Juninho (yellow card) 90+4'	Stadium: Republican Stadium; Referee: Henrik Nalbandian

5 November 2024 15	Van	4–0	Ararat Yerevan	Charentsavan
15:00 (UTC+4)	Touré 26' (yellow card) 45+1'; Nalbandyan 37'; Drammeh 47'; Vardanyan 88'	Report		Stadium: City Stadium; Referee: Vardan Manukyan

10 November 2024 16	Ararat Yerevan	0–0	Ararat-Armenia	Yerevan
15:00 (UTC+4)	Faye (yellow card) 63'; Malakyan (yellow card) 65'; Dombila (yellow card) 90+1'; Grigoryan (yellow card) 90+2'; Trémoulet (yellow card) 90+4' (red card) 90+4'	Report	Yenne (yellow card) 73'; Queirós (yellow card) 90+2'	Stadium: Yerevan Football Academy Stadium; Referee: Yura Mahtesyan

20 November 2024 17	Noah	4–0	Ararat Yerevan	Abovyan
18:00 (UTC+4)	Muradyan 16'; Sangaré (yellow card) 34'; Pinson 45+5'; Ferreira 58'; Oulad Omar 73'	Report		Stadium: City Stadium; Referee: Ashot Ghaltakhchyan

27 November 2024 18	BKMA Yerevan	1–1	Ararat Yerevan	Yerevan
17:00 (UTC+4)	Manukyan 15'; Avetisyan (yellow card) 63'; Eloyan (yellow card) 90'	Report	Goore 5'; Kante (yellow card) 90+1'	Stadium: Yerevan Football Academy Stadium; Referee: Artem Gasparyan

3 December 2024 19	Ararat Yerevan	2–3	West Armenia	Yerevan
15:00 (UTC+4)	Goore 18', 19' (yellow card) 21'; Malakyan (red card) 90+6'	Report	Grigoryan 12'; Makhsudyan (yellow card) 42'; Idris (yellow card) 45'; Smbatyan (yellow card) 55'; Kartashyan (yellow card) 57' (goal) 77'; Tarasenko 58'; Dragojević (yellow card) 90+6'	Stadium: Republican Stadium; Referee: Vardan Vardumyan

28 February 2025 21	Gandzasar Kapan	0–3	Ararat Yerevan	Yerevan
17:00 (UTC+4)		Report		Stadium: Junior Sport Stadium
Note: The match was initially suspended due to crowd disturbances, and was later awarded as a 3-0 technical victory to Ararat Yerevan on 11 May 2025.

8 March 2025 22	Alashkert	0–1	Ararat Yerevan	Armavir
14:00 (UTC+4)	Musakhanyan (yellow card) 14'; Katoh (yellow card) 57'; Kireyenko (yellow card) 65'; Kikonda (yellow card) 77'; B.Hovhannisyan (yellow card) 90+2'	Report	Kante (yellow card) 14'; Boniface (yellow card) 33' (goal) 50' (pen.); Dombila (yellow card) 51'; Kante (yellow card) 60'; Marcelo (yellow card) 76'	Stadium: Armavir City Stadium; Referee: Artem Gasparyan

13 March 2025 23	Ararat Yerevan	1–1	BKMA Yerevan	Yerevan
15:00 (UTC+4)	Lulukyan 25'; Kante (yellow card) 31'; Kante (yellow card) 83'	Report	D.Hakobyan 27'; Petrosyan (yellow card) 42' (yellow-red card) 77'; K.Hovhannisyan (yellow card) 68'	Stadium: Junior Sport Stadium; Referee: Atom Sevgulyan

27 March 2025 24	Ararat Yerevan	1–1	Gandzasar Kapan	Yerevan
18:00 (UTC+4)	Bah (yellow card) 27'; Kante (yellow card) 32'; Marcelo (yellow card) 66'; Boniface 90+7'	Report	Mani 13' (yellow card) 80'; Merrill (yellow card) 30'; Faye (red card) 90+7'	Stadium: Republican Stadium; Referee: Artak Vardanyan

4 April 2025 25	Ararat Yerevan	1–2	Shirak	Yerevan
18:00 (UTC+4)	Doumbia 22'; Evouna (yellow card) 45+4'; Khachumyan (yellow card) 71'	Report	Traore (yellow card) 35'; Doh (yellow card) 44'; Urushanyan 72' (yellow card) 80'; Misakyan 84'; L.Darbinyan (yellow card) 85'; Sumbulyan (yellow card) 90+1'	Stadium: Republican Stadium

8 April 2025 20	Shirak	1–3	Ararat Yerevan	Gyumri
18:30 (UTC+4)	Mryan 88'; Darbinyan (yellow card) 90'	Report	Doumbia 18', 52'; Malakyan (yellow card) 22'; Kante (yellow card) 34'; Khachumyan 44'; Berte (yellow card) 79'; Kante (yellow card) 90'	Stadium: City Stadium; Referee: Artem Gasparyan

14 April 2025 26	West Armenia	2–1	Ararat Yerevan	Yerevan
16:00 (UTC+4)	Granado (yellow card) 45+1' (goal) 53'; Makhsudyan (yellow card) 65'; Blake 78' (yellow card) 85'; Ayunts (yellow card) 90+2'; Danielyan (yellow card) 90+5'	Report	Diabira (red card) 20'; Ayvazyan (yellow card) 65'; Bah 69'; Boniface (yellow card) 83'	Stadium: Junior Sport Stadium; Referee: Artak Vardanyan

18 April 2025 27	Ararat Yerevan	3–2	Alashkert	Yerevan
16:00 (UTC+4)	Boniface 2'; Bah 58', 70'	Report	Martirosyan 26'; Metoyan 33'; A.Hovhannisyan (yellow card) 75'	Stadium: Republican Stadium; Referee: Zaven Hovhannisyan

26 April 2025 28	Noah	3–0	Ararat Yerevan	Yerevan
19:00 (UTC+4)	Çinari (yellow card) 41' (goal) 53'; Silva 49'; Gregório 80'	Report	Dombila (yellow card) 70'	Stadium: Republican Stadium; Referee: Hovhannes Kalantaryan

29	Bye
(UTC+4)

8 May 2025 30	Ararat Yerevan	2–1	Van	Yerevan
16:00 (UTC+4)	Doumbia 7'; Kante 90+1' (yellow card) 90+7'	Report	Drammeh 16'; Okonkwo (yellow card) 55'; Nalbandyan (yellow card) 74'	Stadium: Republican Stadium; Referee: Artem Gasparyan

17 May 2025 31	Pyunik	5–2	Ararat Yerevan	Abovyan
18:30 (UTC+4)	Déblé 25', 38'; Otubanjo 53'; Doumbia 58' (o.g.); Malakyan 63' (pen.); Davidyan (yellow card) 73'	Report	Bah (yellow card) 10'; Kante (yellow card) 30' (goal) 41'; Doumbia 55'; Dombila (yellow card) 57'; Faye (yellow card) 62'	Stadium: City Stadium; Referee: Vardan Manukyan

24 May 2025 32	Ararat Yerevan	2–4	Urartu	Yerevan
16:00 (UTC+4)	Johna 42'; Kante (red card) 70'; Samsonyan (yellow card) 87'; Simonyan (yellow card) 90+2'; Bah 90+4'	Report	Melkonyan 3'; Paliyenko (yellow card) 10'; Gunko 52'; Polyarus 66'; Margaryan (yellow card) 70'; Aghasaryan (red card) 70'; Yakovlev 85'	Stadium: Vazgen Sargsyan Republican Stadium; Referee: Vardan Vardumyan

28 May 2025 33	Ararat-Armenia	6–0	Ararat Yerevan	Yerevan
19:00 (UTC+4)	Noubissi 29', 61', 79'; Harutyunyan 43'; Yenne 75'; Ambartsumyan 76'; Shaghoyan (yellow card) 88'	Report	Bah (yellow card) 39'; Toure (yellow card) 58'	Stadium: Yerevan Football Academy Stadium; Referee: Hovhannes Kalantaryan

==== League table ====
Pos	Team	Pld	W	D	L	GF	GA	GD	Pts	Qualification or relegation
1	Noah (C)	30	24	3	3	92	20	+72	75	Qualification for the Champions League first qualifying round
2	Ararat-Armenia	30	21	3	6	75	28	+47	66	Qualification for the Conference League second qualifying round (Note: The 2024–25 Armenian Cup winners qualified for the Conference League second qualifying round. Since the cup winners (Noah) qualified based on league position, the Conference League second round spot was passed to the second-placed team, and the second Conference League first round spot was passed to the fourth-placed team.)
3	Urartu	30	19	5	6	64	31	+33	62	Qualification for the Conference League first qualifying round
4	Pyunik	30	17	2	11	59	37	+22	53	Qualification for the Conference League first qualifying round
5	Van	30	15	7	8	56	36	+20	52	
6	BKMA	30	10	6	14	44	54	−10	36	
7	Shirak	30	10	5	15	30	50	−20	35	
8	Ararat Yerevan	30	9	5	16	36	59	−23	32	
9	Alashkert	30	6	8	16	24	52	−28	26	
10	West Armenia (Note: On 7 May 2025, it was announced that West Armenia were on the verge of expulsion after a no show against Ararat-Armenia. On 17 May 2025, they were officially expelled and all games were awarded 3–0 to their opponents.) (D, R)	30	7	2	21	22	78	−56	23	Relegation to the Armenian First League
11	Gandzasar Kapan	30	2	4	24	16	73	−57	10	Spared from relegation

Source: FFA
Rules for classification: 1) Points; 2) Head-to-head points; 3) Head-to-head goal difference; 4) Head-to-head goals scored; 5) Matches won; 6) Goal difference; 7) Less red cards; 8) Less yellow cards; 9) Fair-play ranking 10) Draw
(C) Champions; (D) Disqualified; (R) Relegated

=== Armenian Cup ===
2 October 2024 Second Round	Ararat Yerevan	1–1 (a.e.t.) (4–5 p)	Gandzasar Kapan	Abovyan
19:00 (UTC+4)	Samsonyan (yellow card) 60'; Dombila (yellow card) 71'; Hadji 81'; Galstyan (yellow card) (yellow-red card) 92'; Gomes (yellow card) 117'	Report	Mustafayev (yellow card) 17'; Kocharyan 36' (pen.); S.Chibuike (yellow card) 41'; V.Muradyan (yellow card) 61'; Vopanyan (yellow card) 66'; Stepanov (yellow card) 80'; O.Chibuike (yellow card) 94'; Traore (yellow card) 119'	Stadium: Abovyan City Stadium; Referee: Artak Vardanyan
	Penalties
	Lulukyan (penalty scored); Goore (penalty scored); Faye (penalty scored); Hadji (penalty missed); Grigoryan (penalty scored)		(penalty scored) Yedigaryan; (penalty scored) O.Chibuike; (penalty scored) Traore; (penalty scored) Faye; (penalty scored) Pepi

== Squad statistics ==
As of match played 28 May 2025

=== Appearances and goals ===
No.	Pos	Nat	Player	Total		Premier League		Armenian Cup	
No.	Pos	Nat	Player	Apps	Goals	Apps	Goals	Apps	Goals
3	DF	(Armenia) ARM	Albert Khachumyan	25	1	25	1	0	0
4	DF	(Armenia) ARM	Volodya Samsonyan	21	0	14+6	0	1	0
5	MF	(Tunisia) TUN	Rayane Mzoughi	15	1	12+3	1	0	0
6	MF	(Senegal) SEN	Alassane Faye	19	0	14+4	0	1	0
8	MF	(Nigeria) NGR	Christopher Boniface	13	3	8+5	3	0	0
9	MF	(Armenia) ARM	Gor Lulukyan	23	1	7+15	1	0+1	0
11	MF	(Armenia) ARM	Armen Nahapetyan	12	1	1+10	1	1	0
12	DF	(Ghana) GHA	Clinton Dombila	25	0	24	0	1	0
13	GK	(Armenia) ARM	Poghos Ayvazyan	8	0	8	0	0	0
14	FW	(Mali) MLI	Badem Diabira	6	0	1+4	0	0+1	0
15	FW	(Mali) MLI	Kalifala Doumbia	20	5	16+4	5	0	0
17	FW	(Guinea) GUI	Amadou Diakite	3	0	0+3	0	0	0
18	DF	(Mali) MLI	Malick Berte	18	0	15+3	0	0	0
19	FW	(Nigeria) NGR	James Johna	7	1	4+3	1	0	0}
20	MF	(Senegal) SEN	Moussa Kante	23	6	20+3	6	0	0
21	MF	(Armenia) ARM	Serob Galstyan	17	2	13+3	2	1	0
23	MF	(Armenia) ARM	Gor Malakyan	23	0	21+2	0	0	0
27	MF	(Armenia) ARM	Alen Vardanyan	1	0	0+1	0	0	0
28	MF	(Armenia) ARM	Gagik Simonyan	7	0	2+5	0	0	0
30	MF	(Armenia) ARM	Aram Aslanyan	5	0	1+4	0	0	0
33	MF	(Armenia) ARM	Gor Ghukasyan	1	0	0+1	0	0	0
38	MF	(Ivory Coast) CIV	Moussa Kante	14	1	12+2	1	0	0
39	FW	(Ivory Coast) CIV	Keasse Bah	12	4	9+3	4	0	0
54	DF	(Brazil) BRA	Marcelo	14	0	13	0	1	0
63	MF	(Switzerland) SUI	Marc Tsoungui	9	0	6+3	0	0	0
64	MF	(Guinea) GUI	Alseny Toure	5	0	3+2	0	0	0
70	MF	(Armenia) ARM	Alen Mkrtchyan	6	0	0+6	0	0	0
71	GK	(Armenia) ARM	Andranik Martirosyan	6	0	6	0	0	0
77	MF	(Armenia) ARM	Aleksandr Aleksanyan	10	0	1+8	0	1	0
82	GK	(Brazil) BRA	Tiago Gomes	17	0	15+1	0	1	0
92	DF	(France) FRA	Marvin Evouna	6	0	6	0	0	0
Players away on loan:
Players who left Ararat Yerevan during the season:
10	MF	(Armenia) ARM	Artur Grigoryan	18	0	17	0	1	0
34	DF	(Madagascar) MAD	Sandro Trémoulet	8	0	4+3	0	1	0
45	FW	(Ivory Coast) CIV	Hyllarion Goore	15	6	10+4	6	0+1	0
81	MF	(Comoros) COM	Kassim Hadji	17	2	14+2	1	1	1

=== Goal scorers ===
Place	Position	Nation	Number	Name	Premier League	Armenian Cup	Total
1	FW	(Ivory Coast)	45	Hyllarion Goore	6	0	6
1	MF	(Senegal)	20	Moussa Kante	6	0	6
3	FW	(Mali)	15	Kalifala Doumbia	5	0	5
4	FW	(Ivory Coast)	39	Keasse Bah	4	0	4
5	MF	(Nigeria)	8	Christopher Boniface	3	0	3
6	MF	(Armenia)	21	Serob Galstyan	2	0	2
6	MF	(Comoros)	81	Kassim Hadji	1	1	2
8	MF	(Armenia)	11	Armen Nahapetyan	1	0	1
8	MF	(Tunisia)	5	Rayane Mzoughi	1	0	1
8	MF	(Armenia)	9	Gor Lulukyan	1	0	1
8	DF	(Armenia)	3	Albert Khachumyan	1	0	1
8	MF	(Ivory Coast)	38	Moussa Kante	1	0	1
8	FW	(Nigeria)	19	James Johna	1	0	1
				Awarded	3	0	3
				TOTALS	36	1	37

=== Clean sheets ===
Place	Position	Nation	Number	Name	Premier League	Armenian Cup	Total
1	GK	(Brazil)	82	Tiago Gomes	3	0	3
2	GK	(Armenia)	13	Poghos Ayvazyan	1	0	1
				TOTALS	4	0	4

=== Disciplinary record ===
Number	Nation	Position	Name	Premier League		Armenian Cup		Total	
Number	Nation	Position	Name	Yellow card	Red card	Yellow card	Red card	Yellow card	Red card
3	(Armenia)	DF	Albert Khachumyan	2	0	0	0	2	0
4	(Armenia)	DF	Volodya Samsonyan	1	0	1	0	2	0
6	(Senegal)	MF	Alassane Faye	3	0	0	0	3	0
8	(Nigeria)	MF	Christopher Boniface	2	0	0	0	2	0
11	(Armenia)	MF	Armen Nahapetyan	1	0	0	0	1	0
12	(Ghana)	DF	Clinton Dombila	9	0	1	0	10	0
13	(Armenia)	GK	Poghos Ayvazyan	1	0	0	0	1	0
14	(Mali)	FW	Badem Diabira	1	1	0	0	1	1
18	(Mali)	DF	Malick Berte	1	0	0	0	1	0
20	(Senegal)	MF	Moussa Kante	10	1	0	0	10	1
21	(Armenia)	MF	Serob Galstyan	0	0	2	1	2	1
23	(Armenia)	MF	Gor Malakyan	6	1	0	0	6	1
28	(Armenia)	MF	Gagik Simonyan	1	0	0	0	1	0
38	(Ivory Coast)	MF	Moussa Kante	5	0	0	0	5	0
39	(Ivory Coast)	FW	Keasse Bah	3	0	0	0	3	0
54	(Brazil)	DF	Marcelo	3	0	0	0	3	0
64	(Guinea)	MF	Alseny Toure	1	0	0	0	1	0
82	(Brazil)	GK	Tiago Gomes	1	0	1	0	2	0
92	(France)	DF	Marvin Evouna	1	0	0	0	1	0
Players away on loan:
Players who left Ararat Yerevan during the season:
10	(Armenia)	MF	Artur Grigoryan	1	0	0	0	1	0
34	(Madagascar)	DF	Sandro Trémoulet	2	1	0	0	2	1
45	(Ivory Coast)	FW	Hyllarion Goore	3	0	0	0	3	0
81	(Comoros)	MF	Kassim Hadji	2	0	0	0	2	0
			TOTALS	60	4	5	1	65	5
