= 2025–26 FC Ararat Yerevan season =

Ararat Yerevan
2025–26 season
- President: Hrach Kaprielian
- Manager: Albert Safaryan (until 17 January); Ricardo Dionísio (from 17 January)
- Stadium: Republican Stadium
- Premier League: 9th
- Armenian Cup: Quarter-final
- Top goalscorer: League: Kalifala Doumbia (10); All: Kalifala Doumbia (12)
Home colours	Away colours	Third colours

The 2025–26 season was FC Ararat Yerevan's 35th consecutive season in the Armenian Premier League, where they also competed in the Armenian Cup.

== Season overview ==
On 20 June, Ararat announced the signing of Artur Kartashyan from Alashkert.

On 21 June, Ararat announced the signing of Abdul Djire from JMG Academy.

On 30 June, Ararat announced the signing of Artur Grigoryan from Pyunik.

On 9 July, Ararat announced the signing of Arman Hovhannisyan from Pyunik.

On 13 July, Ararat announced the signing of Zakaria Maknoun from Al-Washm.

On 17 July, Ararat announced the signing of Adama Meite from JMG Djekanou Academy.

On 18 July, Ararat announced the signing of Patrick Handzongo from Colombe Sportive du Dja.

On 22 July, Ararat announced the signing of Yaya Sogodogo from Zoman.

On 23 July, Ararat announced the signing of Mohamed Fofana from Zoman.

On 28 July, Ararat announced the signing of Tigran Sargsyan from West Armenia.

On 18 August, Ararat announced the signing of Adel Anzimati from Martigues, and Aboubacar Ouattara from Leader Foot Academie.

On 28 August, Ararat announced the signing of Guy Lima from United Académie.

On 21 February, Ararat announced the signing of Souleymane Touré from Motema Pembe.

On 24 February, Ararat announced the signings of Okuchukwu Chukwu, Emmanuel Obinna and Divine Ukadike from Golden Boot.

On 25 February, Ararat announced the signings of Ayomide Enialafia and Alexander Handsome from Nigerian club Golden Boot.

== Squad ==
As of match played 26 May 2026

Number	Name	Nationality	Position	Date of birth (age)	Signed from	Signed in	Contract ends	Apps.	Goals
Goalkeepers
1	Adel Anzimati	(Comoros)	GK	5 November 2001 (aged 24)	Martigues	2025		26	0
71	Andranik Martirosyan	(Armenia)	GK	1 January 2003 (aged 23)	Tigranakert	2024		7	0
Defenders
3	Albert Khachumyan	(Armenia)	DF	23 June 1999 (aged 26)	Ararat-Armenia	2024		64	1
4	Volodya Samsonyan	(Armenia)	DF	24 February 2001 (aged 25)	BKMA Yerevan	2023		71	0
5	Artur Kartashyan	(Armenia)	DF	8 January 1997 (aged 29)	Alashkert	2025		22	0
12	Clinton Dombila	(Ghana)	DF	10 February 2005 (aged 21)	JMG Academy	2023		55	0
17	Ernest Kacou	(Ivory Coast)	DF	28 November 2005 (aged 20)	Abidjan City	2025		6	0
18	Malick Berte	(Mali)	DF	24 February 2004 (aged 22)	Guidars	2023		53	0
19	Souleymane Touré	(Mali)	DF	26 January 2007 (aged 19)	Motema Pembe	2026		4	0
30	Aram Aslanyan	(Armenia)	DF	17 March 2005 (aged 21)	Academy	2023		25	0
32	Divine Ukadike	(Nigeria)	DF	14 August 2004 (aged 21)	Golden Boot	2026		7	0
51	Tigran Hakobyan	(Armenia)	DF	30 August 2007 (aged 18)	Academy	2026		1	0
55	Guy Lima	(Senegal)	DF	7 October 2006 (aged 19)	United Académie	2025		10	1
78	Aphelele Modolwana	(South Africa)	DF	26 February 2003 (aged 23)	Hout Bay United	2025		3	0
90	Alexander Handsome	(Nigeria)	DF	8 February 2005 (aged 21)	Golden Boot	2026		0	0
Midfielders
6	Okuchukwu Chukwu	(Nigeria)	MF	7 May 2007 (aged 19)	Golden Boot	2026		6	0
8	Abdul Djire	(Mali)	MF	7 December 2005 (aged 20)	JMG Academy	2026		9	0
9	Gor Lulukyan	(Armenia)	MF	2 January 2003 (aged 23)	Urartu	2024		45	3
10	Artur Grigoryan	(Armenia)	MF	10 July 1993 (aged 32)	Pyunik	2025		61	1
21	Ayomide Enialafia	(Nigeria)	MF	12 March 2007 (aged 19)	Golden Boot	2026		0	0
25	Aboubacar Ouattara	(Ivory Coast)	MF	10 July 1993 (aged 32)	Leader Foot Academie	2025		19	3
28	Gagik Simonyan	(Armenia)	MF	8 March 2006 (aged 20)	Academy	2023		7	0
37	Aramayis Khachatryan	(Armenia)	MF	19 January 2004 (aged 22)	Academy	2025		1	0
38	Moussa Kante	(Ivory Coast)	MF	19 August 2005 (aged 20)	Bokakokore Academy	2024		41	4
42	Mohamed Fofana	(Ivory Coast)	MF	20 December 2005 (aged 20)	Zoman	2025		28	0
70	Alen Mkrtchyan	(Armenia)	MF	17 August 2006 (aged 19)	Academy	2023		8	0
77	Aleksandr Aleksanyan	(Armenia)	MF	14 November 2006 (aged 19)	Academy	2023		19	0
Forwards
7	Patrick Handzongo	(Cameroon)	FW	9 September 2004 (aged 21)	Colombe Sportive du Dja	2025		20	1
11	Yaya Sogodogo	(Ivory Coast)	FW	20 November 2002 (aged 23)	Zoman	2025		17	2
14	Emmanuel Obinna	(Nigeria)	FW	29 August 2007 (aged 18)	Golden Boot	2026		9	1
15	Kalifala Doumbia	(Mali)	FW	28 September 2004 (aged 21)	Guidars	2023		66	18
20	Adama Meite	(Ivory Coast)	FW	20 April 2004 (aged 22)	JMG Djekanou Academy	2025		18	1
27	Alen Vardanyan	(Armenia)	FW	26 December 2006 (aged 19)	Academy	2023		3	0
29	Vahe Tovmasyan	(Armenia)	FW	9 February 2009 (aged 17)	Academy	2025		4	0
Players away on loan
91	Suren Kirakosyan	(Armenia)	MF	23 December 2006 (aged 19)	Alashkert	2023		0	0
Players who left during the season
2	Arman Hovhannisyan	(Armenia)	DF	7 July 1993 (aged 32)	Pyunik	2025		7	0
6	Alassane Faye	(Senegal)	MF	28 September 2003 (aged 22)	Casa Sports	2023		58	1
13	Poghos Ayvazyan	(Armenia)	GK	9 June 1995 (aged 30)	Lernayin Artsakh	2024		11	0
14	Zakaria Maknoun	(Belgium)	MF	5 June 2000 (aged 25)	Al-Washm	2025		4	0
19	James Johna	(Nigeria)	FW	26 December 2001 (aged 24)	Right2Win SA	2025		14	1
21	Tigran Sargsyan	(Armenia)	MF	14 August 2003 (aged 22)	West Armenia	2025		3	0
23	Gor Malakyan	(Armenia)	MF	12 June 1994 (aged 31)	Pyunik	2021		117	4
24	Hadji Moustapha	(Cameroon)	DF	4 December 2003 (aged 22)	Gazelle FA de Garoua	2023		56	5
33	Gor Ghukasyan	(Armenia)	MF	25 October 2005 (aged 20)	Urartu	2023		1	0
54	Marcello	(Brazil)	DF	7 April 2003 (aged 23)	Serra Macaense	2024		22	0
63	Marc Tsoungui	(Switzerland)	MF	30 July 2002 (aged 23)	Stade Lausanne Ouchy	2025		9	0
64	Alseny Toure	(Guinea)	MF	14 May 2006 (aged 20)	Wakriya	2025		5	0
82	Tiago Gomes	(Brazil)	GK	20 January 2003 (aged 23)	Bahia	2024		33	0
92	Marvin Evouna	(France)	DF	6 April 2001 (aged 25)	Unattached	2025		6	0
	Moussa Kante	(Senegal)	MF	8 May 2004 (aged 22)	Olympique Lyonnais	2024		23	6

== Transfers ==
=== In ===
Date	Position	Nationality	Name	From	Fee	Ref.
20 June 2025	DF	(Armenia)	Artur Kartashyan	Alashkert	Undisclosed	
21 June 2025	MF	(Mali)	Abdul Djire	JMG Academy	Undisclosed	
30 June 2025	MF	(Armenia)	Artur Grigoryan	Pyunik	Undisclosed	
9 July 2025	DF	(Armenia)	Arman Hovhannisyan	Pyunik	Undisclosed	
13 July 2025	MF	(Belgium)	Zakaria Maknoun	Al-Washm	Undisclosed	
17 July 2025	FW	(Ivory Coast)	Adama Meite	JMG Djekanou Academy	Undisclosed	
13 July 2025	FW	(Cameroon)	Patrick Handzongo	Colombe Sportive du Dja	Undisclosed	
22 July 2025	FW	(Ivory Coast)	Yaya Sogodogo	Zoman	Undisclosed	
23 July 2025	MF	(Ivory Coast)	Mohamed Fofana	Zoman	Undisclosed	
28 July 2025	MF	(Armenia)	Tigran Sargsyan	West Armenia	Undisclosed	
18 August 2025	GK	(Comoros)	Adel Anzimati	Martigues	Undisclosed	
18 August 2025	MF	(Ivory Coast)	Aboubacar Ouattara	Leader Foot Academie	Undisclosed	
28 August 2025	DF	(Senegal)	Guy Lima	United Académie	Undisclosed	
21 February 2026	DF	(Ivory Coast)	Souleymane Touré	Motema Pembe	Undisclosed	
24 February 2026	DF	(Nigeria)	Divine Ukadike	Golden Boot	Undisclosed	
24 February 2026	MF	(Nigeria)	Okuchukwu Chukwu	Golden Boot	Undisclosed	
24 February 2026	FW	(Nigeria)	Emmanuel Obinna	Golden Boot	Undisclosed	
25 February 2026	DF	(Nigeria)	Alexander Handsome	Golden Boot	Undisclosed	
25 February 2026	MF	(Nigeria)	Ayomide Enialafia	Golden Boot	Undisclosed	

=== Released ===
Date	Position	Nationality	Name	Joined	Date	Ref
11 July 2025	GK	(Brazil)	Tiago Gomes	Drenica		
11 July 2025	DF	(Switzerland)	Marc Tsoungui	Unirea Slobozia		
28 July 2025	DF	(France)	Marvin Evouna			
14 August 2025	MF	(Armenia)	Gor Malakyan	Retired		
19 August 2025	MF	(Nigeria)	Christopher Boniface	Al Kharaitiyat	19 August 2025	
5 December 2025	GK	(Armenia)	Poghos Ayvazyan	Syunik		
6 December 2025	MF	(Armenia)	Tigran Sargsyan	Van		
17 December 2025	FW	(Nigeria)	James Johna			
31 December 2025	DF	(Cameroon)	Hadji Moustapha	HNK Gorica	14 April 2026	
11 January 2026	MF	(Senegal)	Moussa Kante	Racing-Union	11 January 2026	
17 January 2026	MF	(Senegal)	Alassane Faye			
17 January 2026	MF	(Belgium)	Zakaria Maknoun			
17 January 2026	MF	(Guinea)	Alseny Touré	ES Zarzis	26 January 2026	
29 January 2026	DF	(Brazil)	Marcello	Zimbru Chișinău	28 February 2026	

== Competitions ==
=== Overview ===
Competition	First match	Last match	Starting round	Final position	Record							
Competition	First match	Last match	Starting round	Final position	Pld	W	D	L	GF	GA	GD	Win %
Premier League	1 August 2025	26 May 2026	Matchday 1	9th	27	3	4	20	21	63	−42	11.11
Armenian Cup	30 October 2025	1 April 2026	Round of 16	Quarter-final	3	2	0	1	6	5	+1	66.67
Total					30	5	4	21	27	68	−41	16.67

Last updated: 26 May 2026
Source: Competitions

=== Premier League ===
==== Results summary ====
Overall								Home						Away					
Pld	W	D	L	GF	GA	GD	Pts	W	D	L	GF	GA	GD	W	D	L	GF	GA	GD
27	3	4	20	21	63	−42	13	1	3	9	8	20	−12	2	1	11	13	43	−30

Last updated: 26 May 2026.
Source: See Results

==== Results by round ====
Round	1	2	3	4	5	6	7	8	9	10	11	12	13	14	15	17	18	19	20	16	21	22	23	24	25	26	27
Ground	A	H	A	H	A	A	A	A	H	A	H	H	H	H	A	A	H	A	H	H	A	H	A	A	H	A	H
Result	D	L	L	L	L	L	L	L	D	L	L	L	D	L	L	W	L	L	L	L	L	W	L	W	W	L	D
Position	6	7	8	10	10	10	10	10	10	10	10	10	10	10	10	10	10	10	10	10	10	10	10	9	9	10	9

Updated to match(es) played on 26 May 2026. Source: See Results
A = Away; H = Home; W = Win; D = Draw; L = Loss

==== Results ====
1 August 2025 1	Gandzasar Kapan	1–1	Ararat Yerevan	Yerevan
19:00 (UTC+4)	Emmanuel (yellow card) 20'; Merrill 34'; Voskanyan (yellow card) 34'; Obonde (yellow card) 61'	Report	Kante 68'; Dombila (yellow card) 90+4'	Stadium: Junior Sport Stadium; Referee: Yura Mahtesyan

9 August 2025 2	Ararat Yerevan	0–1	Van	Abovyan
17:00 (UTC+4)	Marcello (yellow card) 58'; Kante (yellow card) 90+3'	Report	Eriki 47'; Manukyan (yellow card) 79'	Stadium: Vahagn Tumasyan Stadium; Referee: Ashot Ghaltakhchyan

16 August 2025 3	Alashkert	3–0	Ararat Yerevan	Armavir
17:00 (UTC+4)	Nalbandyan 5', 45+3'; Drammeh (yellow card) 63'; Touré 70' (pen.)	Report	Moustapha (red card) 11'; Khachumyan (yellow card) 37'; Kante (yellow card) 47' (yellow-red card) 79'	Stadium: Hakob Tonoyan Stadium; Referee: Ashot Ghaltakhchyan

22 August 2025 4	Ararat Yerevan	0–2	Pyunik	Yerevan
18:00 (UTC+4)	Meite (yellow card) 30'	Report	Moreno (yellow card) 44'; Ocansey 51'; Hovhannisyan (yellow card) 65'; Miljković (yellow card) 71'; Gonçalves 90+5'	Stadium: Republican Stadium; Referee: Ashot Harutyunyan

30 August 2025 5	Ararat-Armenia	4–2	Ararat Yerevan	Yerevan
19:00 (UTC+4)	Fofana 25' (o.g.); Muradyan (yellow card) 47'; Balanta (yellow card) 58'; Queirós 77'; Bueno (yellow card) 78'; Eloyan 86'; Gbomadu 90'; Hovhannisyan (yellow card) 90+7'	Report	Moustapha 21'; Meite 39'; Khachumyan (yellow card) 62'; Anzimati (yellow card) 78'	Stadium: Academy Stadium; Referee: Sargis Khachatryan

12 September 2025 6	Shirak	4–2	Ararat Yerevan	Gyumri
19:00 (UTC+4)	Misakyan 12' (pen.); Manukyan 19'; Tarloyan (yellow card) 22'; Darbinyan (yellow card) 45+5'; Urushanyan (yellow card) 80'; Mryan (penalty missed) 90+3' 90+3' (yellow card) 90+9'; Sumbulyan (yellow card) 90+4'; Tovmasyan 90+10'	Report	Handzongo 13'; Kante 37'; Meite (yellow card) 45'; Sogodogo (yellow card) 45+5' (red card) 56'; Grigoryan (yellow card) 55'; Dombila (yellow card) 88' (yellow-red card) 90+1'	Stadium: City Stadium; Referee: Vardan Manukyan

19 September 2025 7	Urartu	6–0	Ararat Yerevan	Yerevan
19:00 (UTC+4)	Michel 11', 46', 53', 81'; Agasaryan (yellow card) 45+1'; Gunko 69'; Kaloukian 78'	Report	Moustapha (yellow card) 15'; Meite (yellow card) 33'; Handzongo (yellow card) 37'; Samsonyan (yellow card) 86'	Stadium: Urartu Stadium; Referee: Hovhannes Kalantaryan

28 September 2025 8	Noah	2–0	Ararat Yerevan	Yerevan
19:00 (UTC+4)	Manvelyan (yellow card) 73' (goal) 90+2' (pen.); Aiás 90+3'	Report	Dombila (red card) 38'; Handzongo (yellow card) 73'; Khachumyan (yellow card) 90+1'	Stadium: Republican Stadium; Referee: Zaven Hovhannisyan

4 October 2025 9	Ararat Yerevan	2–2	BKMA Yerevan	Yerevan
19:00 (UTC+4)	Sogodogo (yellow card) 32' (goal) 75'; Doumbia 49'; Handzongo (yellow card) 70'	Report	Hovhannisyan 8' (pen.); Sargsyan 36'; Ar.Petrosyan (yellow card) 87'; G.Petrosyan (yellow card) 90+7'	Stadium: Republican Stadium; Referee: Hovhannes Kalantaryan

19 October 2025 10	BKMA Yerevan	4–0	Ararat Yerevan	Yerevan
19:00 (UTC+4)	Ayvazyan 13'; Janoyan (yellow card) 23'; Sargsyan 66'; Afyan 69'; Ar.Petrosyan 90+3'	Report	Kartashyan (yellow card) 35'	Stadium: Academy Stadium; Referee: Henrik Nalbandian

27 October 2025 11	Ararat Yerevan	0–3	Noah	Yerevan
19:00 (UTC+4)	Djire (yellow card) 4'; Moustapha (yellow card) 32'; Samsonyan (yellow card) 60'; Johna (yellow card) 67'; Grigoryan (yellow card) 71'	Report	Manvelyan (yellow card) 32'; Aiás 44', 63'; Oshima (yellow card) 54'; Khamoyan (yellow card) 58'; Hambardzumyan (yellow card) 83'; Sangaré 90+5'	Stadium: Republican Stadium; Referee: Yura Mahtesyan

3 November 2025 12	Ararat Yerevan	0–1	Urartu	Yerevan
19:00 (UTC+4)	Moustapha (yellow card) 18'; Khachumyan (yellow card) 57'	Report	Bratkov 14' (yellow card) 36'; Santos (yellow card) 32'; Michel (yellow card) 78'; Tsymbalyuk (yellow card) 90+3'	Stadium: Vazgen Sargsyan Republican Stadium; Referee: Artem Gasparyan

9 November 2025 13	Ararat Yerevan	0–0	Shirak	Abovyan
18:00 (UTC+4)	Khachumyan (yellow card) 47'	Report	Darbinyan (yellow card) 90+5'	Stadium: Vahagn Tumasyan Stadium; Referee: Henrik Nalbandian

21 November 2025 14	Ararat Yerevan	1–2	Ararat-Armenia	Yerevan
17:00 (UTC+4)	Sogodogo 89'	Report	Ambartsumyan 42'; Ramos (yellow card) 53'; Oliveira 62'	Stadium: Republican Stadium; Referee: Sargis Khachatryan

30 November 2025 15	Pyunik	2–0	Ararat Yerevan	Abovyan
19:00 (UTC+4)	Kulikov (yellow card) 28'; Kovalenko (yellow card) 52'; Noubissi 66', 90+3'	Report	Doumbia (yellow card) 55'	Stadium: Vahagn Tumasyan Stadium; Referee: Zaven Hovhannisyan

7 March 2026 17	Van	1–2	Ararat Yerevan	Charentsavan
15:00 (UTC+4)	Mkoyan (yellow card) 45+1'; Maurinho 76'; Krasovski (yellow card) 90+6'	Report	Aslanyan (yellow card) 44'; Doumbia 85', 90+7' (pen.)	Stadium: City Stadium; Referee: Yura Mahtesyan

14 March 2026 18	Ararat Yerevan	0–2	Gandzasar Kapan	Yerevan
18:00 (UTC+4)	Fofana (yellow card) 38'; Kante (yellow card) 61'; Obinna (yellow card) 73'	Report	Emmanuel (yellow card) 24'; Mani 49'; Lucca 56'; Lizalda (yellow card) 90+6'	Stadium: Republican Stadium; Referee: Vardan Manukyan

21 March 2026 19	Gandzasar Kapan	2–1	Ararat Yerevan	Yerevan
19:00 (UTC+4)	Lucca 12'; Mani 18' (yellow card) 37'; Avetisyan (yellow card) 73'; Ekongolo (yellow card) 90+6'; Kalmarzy (yellow card) 90+6'	Report	Obinna 45+2'; Kante (yellow card) 62'; Doumbia (yellow card) 72'; Khachumyan (yellow card) 90+6'; Grigoryan (yellow card) 90+6'	Stadium: Junior Sport Stadium; Referee: Zaven Hovhannisyan

4 April 2026 20	Ararat Yerevan	1–2	Van	Yerevan
19:00 (UTC+4)	Doumbia 18'	Report	Avetisyan 45+2' (pen.); N.Manukyan 65'; Markovych (yellow card) 90+1'	Stadium: Republican Stadium; Referee: Hovhannes Kalantaryan

11 April 2026 16	Ararat Yerevan	2–3	Alashkert	Yerevan
15:00 (UTC+4)	Ouattara 35'; Ukadike (yellow card) 45+5'; Lulukyan (yellow card) 54'; Khachumyan (yellow card) 81'; Doumbia 86' (pen.)	Report	Touré 28' (pen.); Sabobo 29'; Macedo (yellow card) 38'; Farayola 45+1' (pen.); Henrique (yellow card) 55'; Piloyan (yellow card) 62'	Stadium: Republican Stadium; Referee: Yura Mahtesyan
Note: Match originally scheduled for and postponed on 27 February, due to adverse weather conditions.

14 April 2026 21	Alashkert	2–0	Ararat Yerevan	Armavir
15:00 (UTC+4)	Hakobyan 44'; Kartashyan 72' (o.g.); Gareginyan (yellow card) 76'; Drammeh (yellow card) 81'	Report	Lima (yellow card) 45'	Stadium: Hakob Tonoyan Stadium; Referee: Vardan Manukyan

18 April 2026 22	Ararat Yerevan	1–0	Pyunik	Yerevan
18:00 (UTC+4)	Fofana (yellow card) 26'; Berte (yellow card) 41'; Anzimati (yellow card) 86'; Doumbia 90+4' (yellow card) 90+5'; Obinna (yellow card) 90+5'	Report	Hovhannisyan (yellow card) 6'; Santos (yellow card) 15'; Islamović (yellow card) 54'; Avagyan (yellow card) 67'; Noubissi (yellow card) 90+7'; Kulikov (yellow card) 90+8'	Stadium: Republican Stadium; Referee: Vardan Vardumyan

25 April 2026 23	Ararat-Armenia	4–0	Ararat Yerevan	Abovyan
18:00 (UTC+4)	Serobyan 22', 28', 59'; Balanta (yellow card) 45'; Tera (yellow card) 66'; Ndour 85'	Report	Lima (yellow card) 50'	Stadium: Vahagn Tumasyan Stadium; Referee: Ashot Ghaltakhchyan

1 May 2026 24	Shirak	0–2	Ararat Yerevan	Gyumri
16:00 (UTC+4)	Karagulyan (yellow card) 56'; Misakyan (yellow card) 69'	Report	Ukadike (yellow card) 36'; Doumbia 57' (pen.), 72'; Fofana (yellow card) 61'; Dombila (yellow card) 85'	Stadium: City Stadium; Referee: Artem Gasparyan

10 May 2026 25	Ararat Yerevan	0–1	Urartu	Yerevan
16:00 (UTC+4)	Kante (yellow card) 45+3'; Lima (yellow card) 54'; Dombila (yellow card) 83'; Ukadike (yellow card) 83'; Meite (yellow card) 85'	Report	Ayvazyan 61'; Piloyan (yellow card) 84'	Stadium: Republican Stadium; Referee: Yura Mahtesyan

19 May 2026 26	Noah	8–3	Ararat Yerevan	Abovyan
19:00 (UTC+4)	Oshima (yellow card) 13'; Aiás 14', 28'; Saintini 23'; Ferreira (yellow card) 43' (goal) 75'; Jakoliš 53', 57'; Oulad Omar 85' (pen.); Mulahusejnović 89'	Report	Aslanyan (yellow card) 25'; Doumbia 44'; Ouattara 47'; Lulukyan 70'; Berte (yellow card) 71'; Anzimati (yellow card) 85'	Stadium: Vahagn Tumasyan Stadium; Referee: Artak Vardanyan

26 May 2026 27	Ararat Yerevan	1–1	BKMA Yerevan	Yerevan
19:00 (UTC+4)	Khachumyan (yellow card) 36'; Fofana (yellow card) 41'; Lima (yellow card) 47'; Doumbia 64' (pen.); Aslanyan (yellow card) 80'; Ouattara (yellow card) 83'	Report	Harutyunyan 48'	Stadium: Republican Stadium; Referee: Yura Mahtesyan

==== League table ====
Pos	Team	Pld	W	D	L	GF	GA	GD	Pts	Qualification or relegation
1	Ararat-Armenia (C)	27	18	6	3	50	25	+25	60	Qualification for the Champions League first qualifying round
2	Noah	27	16	8	3	61	19	+42	56	Qualification for the Conference League second qualifying round (Note: The 2025–26 Armenian Cup winners (Noah) qualify for the Conference League second qualifying round.)
3	Pyunik	27	17	4	6	37	18	+19	55	Qualification for the Conference League first qualifying round
4	Alashkert	27	16	5	6	42	23	+19	53	Qualification for the Conference League first qualifying round
5	Urartu	27	14	7	6	43	26	+17	49	
6	Van	27	9	4	14	27	40	−13	31	
7	BKMA	27	4	11	12	30	42	−12	23	
8	Gandzasar Kapan	27	5	6	16	20	41	−21	21	
9	Ararat Yerevan	27	3	4	20	21	63	−42	13 (Note: Matches won: Ararat 3, Shirak 2)	
10	Shirak	27	2	7	18	17	51	−34	13	

Source: FFA
Rules for classification: 1) Points; 2) Head-to-head points; 3) Head-to-head goal difference; 4) Head-to-head goals scored; 5) Matches won; 6) Goal difference; 7) Less red cards; 8) Less yellow cards; 9) Fair-play ranking 10) Draw
(C) Champions

=== Armenian Cup ===
30 October 2025 Round of 16	Sardarapat	0–3	Ararat Yerevan	Armavir
15:00 (UTC+4)	Budaghyan (yellow card) 30'	Report	Ouattara 63'; Doumbia 67'; Lulukyan 81'	Stadium: Hakob Tonoyan Stadium; Referee: Tiran Yeritsyan

3 March 2026 Quarter-final 1st leg	Ararat Yerevan	0–3	Urartu	Yerevan
17:00 (UTC+4)	Samsonyan (yellow card) 25'; Kartashyan (yellow card) 56'	Report	Margaryan (yellow card) 44'; Piloyan (yellow card) 46'; Michel (yellow card) 56'; Gunko 81'; Melkonyan 90+1' (pen.); Santos 90+7'	Stadium: Republican Stadium; Referee: Artem Gasparyan

1 April 2026 Quarter-final 2nd leg	Urartu	2–3 (5–3 agg.)	Ararat Yerevan	Yerevan
19:00 (UTC+4)	Llovet 27'; Kaloukian 43'	Report	Lima 25'; Ouattara (yellow card) 55'; Kante 88'; Doumbia 90+5'	Stadium: Urartu Stadium; Referee: David Mkrtchyan

== Squad statistics ==
As of match played 26 May 2026

=== Appearances and goals ===
No.	Pos	Nat	Player	Total		Premier League		Armenian Cup	
No.	Pos	Nat	Player	Apps	Goals	Apps	Goals	Apps	Goals
1	GK	(Comoros) COM	Adel Anzimati	26	0	24	0	2	0
3	DF	(Armenia) ARM	Albert Khachumyan	25	0	22+1	0	2	0
4	DF	(Armenia) ARM	Volodya Samsonyan	21	0	16+4	0	1	0
5	DF	(Armenia) ARM	Artur Kartashyan	22	0	19+2	0	1	0
6	MF	(Nigeria) NGR	Okuchukwu Chukwu	6	0	1+3	0	0+2	0
7	FW	(Cameroon) CMR	Patrick Handzongo	20	1	12+7	1	0+1	0
8	MF	(Mali) MLI	Abdul Djire	9	0	6+3	0	0	0
9	MF	(Armenia) ARM	Gor Lulukyan	22	2	12+8	1	1+1	1
10	MF	(Armenia) ARM	Artur Grigoryan	27	0	21+3	0	3	0
11	FW	(Ivory Coast) CIV	Yaya Sogodogo	17	2	9+6	2	2	0
12	DF	(Ghana) GHA	Clinton Dombila	17	0	10+5	0	1+1	0
14	FW	(Nigeria) NGR	Emmanuel Obinna	9	1	1+6	1	1+1	0
15	FW	(Mali) MLI	Kalifala Doumbia	28	12	19+6	10	2+1	2
17	DF	(Ivory Coast) CIV	Ernest Kacou	6	0	1+4	0	1	0
18	DF	(Mali) MLI	Malick Berte	13	0	8+3	0	1+1	0
19	DF	(Mali) MLI	Souleymane Touré	4	0	2+1	0	1	0
20	FW	(Ivory Coast) CIV	Adama Meite	18	1	9+8	1	0+1	0
25	MF	(Ivory Coast) CIV	Aboubacar Ouattara	19	3	7+9	2	2+1	1
27	FW	(Armenia) ARM	Alen Vardanyan	2	0	0+1	0	0+1	0
29	FW	(Armenia) ARM	Vahe Tovmasyan	4	0	0+3	0	1	0
30	DF	(Armenia) ARM	Aram Aslanyan	20	0	11+7	0	2	0
32	DF	(Nigeria) NGR	Divine Ukadike	7	0	4+2	0	1	0
37	MF	(Armenia) ARM	Aramayis Khachatryan	1	0	0+1	0	0	0
38	MF	(Ivory Coast) CIV	Moussa Kante	27	3	21+3	2	1+2	1
42	MF	(Ivory Coast) CIV	Mohamed Fofana	28	0	24+2	0	2	0
51	DF	(Armenia) ARM	Tigran Hakobyan	1	0	0+1	0	0	0
55	DF	(Senegal) SEN	Guy Lima	10	1	8+1	0	1	1
70	MF	(Armenia) ARM	Alen Mkrtchyan	2	0	0+1	0	0+1	0
71	GK	(Armenia) ARM	Andranik Martirosyan	1	0	0	0	1	0
77	MF	(Armenia) ARM	Aleksandr Aleksanyan	7	0	0+5	0	1+1	0
78	DF	(South Africa) RSA	Aphelele Modolwana	3	0	2	0	1	0
Players away on loan:
Players who left Ararat Yerevan during the season:
2	DF	(Armenia) ARM	Arman Hovhannisyan	1	0	1	0	0	0
6	MF	(Senegal) SEN	Alassane Faye	2	0	0+2	0	0	0
13	GK	(Armenia) ARM	Poghos Ayvazyan	3	0	3	0	0	0
14	MF	(Belgium) BEL	Zakaria Maknoun	4	0	0+4	0	0	0
19	FW	(Nigeria) NGR	James Johna	7	0	4+2	0	0+1	0
21	MF	(Armenia) ARM	Tigran Sargsyan	3	0	0+3	0	0	0
23	MF	(Armenia) ARM	Gor Malakyan	1	0	0+1	0	0	0
24	DF	(Cameroon) CMR	Hadji Moustapha	13	1	12	1	1	0
54	DF	(Brazil) BRA	Marcello	8	0	8	0	0	0

=== Goal scorers ===
Place	Position	Nation	Number	Name	Premier League	Armenian Cup	Total
1	FW	(Mali)	15	Kalifala Doumbia	10	2	12
2	MF	(Ivory Coast)	38	Moussa Kante	2	1	3
2	MF	(Ivory Coast)	25	Aboubacar Ouattara	2	1	3
4	FW	(Ivory Coast)	11	Yaya Sogodogo	2	0	2
4	MF	(Armenia)	9	Gor Lulukyan	1	1	2
6	DF	(Cameroon)	24	Hadji Moustapha	1	0	1
6	FW	(Ivory Coast)	20	Adama Meite	1	0	1
6	FW	(Cameroon)	7	Patrick Handzongo	1	0	1
6	FW	(Nigeria)	14	Emmanuel Obinna	1	0	1
6	DF	(Senegal)	55	Guy Lima	0	1	0
				TOTALS	21	6	7

=== Clean sheets ===
Place	Position	Nation	Number	Name	Premier League	Armenian Cup	Total
1	GK	(Comoros)	1	Adel Anzimati	4	1	5
				TOTALS	4	1	5

=== Disciplinary record ===
Number	Nation	Position	Name	Premier League		Armenian Cup		Total	
Number	Nation	Position	Name	Yellow card	Red card	Yellow card	Red card	Yellow card	Red card
1	(Comoros)	GK	Adel Anzimati	1	0	0	0	1	0
3	(Armenia)	DF	Albert Khachumyan	8	0	0	0	8	0
4	(Armenia)	DF	Volodya Samsonyan	2	0	1	0	3	0
5	(Armenia)	DF	Artur Kartashyan	1	0	1	0	2	0
7	(Cameroon)	FW	Patrick Handzongo	3	0	0	0	3	0
8	(Mali)	MF	Abdul Djire	1	0	0	0	1	0
9	(Armenia)	MF	Gor Lulukyan	1	0	0	0	1	0
10	(Armenia)	MF	Artur Grigoryan	3	0	0	0	3	0
11	(Ivory Coast)	FW	Yaya Sogodogo	2	1	0	0	2	1
12	(Ghana)	DF	Clinton Dombila	5	2	0	0	5	2
14	(Nigeria)	FW	Emmanuel Obinna	2	0	0	0	2	0
15	(Mali)	FW	Kalifala Doumbia	3	0	0	0	3	0
18	(Mali)	DF	Malick Berte	1	0	0	0	1	0
20	(Ivory Coast)	FW	Adama Meite	4	0	0	0	4	0
25	(Ivory Coast)	MF	Aboubacar Ouattara	1	0	1	0	2	0
30	(Armenia)	DF	Aram Aslanyan	1	0	0	0	1	0
32	(Nigeria)	DF	Divine Ukadike	3	0	0	0	3	0
38	(Ivory Coast)	MF	Moussa Kante	6	1	0	0	6	1
42	(Ivory Coast)	MF	Mohamed Fofana	4	0	0	0	4	0
55	(Senegal)	DF	Guy Lima	4	0	0	0	4	0
Players away on loan:
Players who left Ararat Yerevan during the season:
19	(Nigeria)	FW	James Johna	1	0	0	0	1	0
24	(Cameroon)	DF	Hadji Moustapha	3	1	0	0	3	1
54	(Brazil)	DF	Marcello	1	0	0	0	1	0
			TOTALS	61	5	3	0	64	5
