= 2023–24 FC Ararat Yerevan season =

Ararat Yerevan
2023–24 season
- President: Hrach Kaprielian
- Manager: Gagik Simonyan (until 12 December); Rafael Nazaryan (15 December - 26 January); Tigran Yesayan (from 19 February)
- Stadium: Republican Stadium
- Premier League: 6th
- Armenian Cup: Second round
- Top goalscorer: League: Kassim Hadji (7); All: Kassim Hadji (7)
Home colours	Away colours	Third colours

The 2023–24 season was FC Ararat Yerevan's 33rd consecutive season in the Armenian Premier League, where they will also compete in the Armenian Cup.

== Season overview ==
On 8 June, Ararat Yerevan announced the signing of Volodya Samsonyan from BKMA Yerevan.

On 16 June, Ararat Yerevan announced the signing of Arman Harutyunyan from Lernayin Artsakh.

On 1 July, Ararat Yerevan announced the signing of Armen Nahapetyan from Ararat-Armenia.

On 17 July, Ararat Yerevan announced the signing of Narek Hovhannisyan from Syunik. with Rayane Mzoughi signing from AS Gabès the following day.

On 25 July, Ararat Yerevan announced the signing of Arsen Galstyan from Noah.

On 10 August, Ararat Yerevan announced the signing of Malick Aziz Berte from Gidars in Mali, with Kalifala Doombia also joining from Gidars the following day. On 12 August, Clinton Dombila joined from JMG Academy.

On 12 September, Ararat Yerevan announced the signing of free agent Bertrand Mani, who'd previously played for Cape Town City.

On 17 September, Ararat Yerevan announced the signing of Clément Lhernault from AS Nancy.

On 12 December, Head Coach Gagik Simonyan left his role. On 15 December, Rafael Nazaryan was announced as Ararat's new Head Coach.

On 22 January, Ararat Yerevan announced the signing of Tiago Gomes from Bahia.

On 26 January, Ararat announced that Head Coach Rafael Nazaryan had left the club after his contract was terminated by mutual agreement.

On 19 February, Tigran Yesayan was announced as the new Head Coach of Ararat.

On 23 February, Ararat Yerevan announced the signing of Ramses Donfack from Coton Sport.

== Squad ==
As of match played 24 May 2024

Number	Name	Nationality	Position	Date of birth (age)	Signed from	Signed in	Contract ends	Apps.	Goals
Goalkeepers
1	Tiago Gomes	(Brazil)	GK	20 January 2003 (aged 21)	Bahia	2024		16	0
98	Nemanja Lemajic	(Montenegro)	GK	14 May 1998 (aged 26)	Arsenal Tivat	2022		20	0
Defenders
2	Ayman Mahmoud	(Tunisia)	DF	24 April 1996 (aged 28)	Olympique Béja	2023		33	3
3	Albert Khachumyan	(Armenia)	DF	23 June 1999 (aged 24)	Ararat-Armenia	2024		14	0
4	Volodya Samsonyan	(Armenia)	DF	24 February 2001 (aged 23)	BKMA Yerevan	2023		29	0
5	Narek Simonyan	(Armenia)	DF	11 November 2005 (aged 18)	Pyunik	2023		0	0
12	Clinton Dombila	(Ghana)	DF	10 February 2005 (aged 19)	JMG Academy	2023		13	0
18	Malick Berte	(Mali)	DF	24 February 2004 (aged 20)	Gidars	2023		22	0
21	Serob Galstyan	(Armenia)	DF	23 September 2002 (aged 21)	Torpedo Yerevan	2020	2025	70	4
24	Hadji Issa Moustapha	(Cameroon)	DF	4 December 2003 (aged 20)	Gazelle FA de Garoua	2023		43	4
Midfielders
8	Clément Lhernault	(France)	MF	13 February 2003 (aged 21)	AS Nancy	2023		17	3
10	Artur Grigoryan	(Armenia)	MF	10 July 1993 (aged 30)	BKMA Yerevan	2024		16	1
11	Armen Nahapetyan	(Armenia)	MF	24 July 1999 (aged 24)	Ararat-Armenia	2023		21	3
14	Rayane Mzoughi	(Tunisia)	MF	8 January 2000 (aged 24)	AS Gabès	2023		25	0
19	Alassane Faye	(Senegal)	MF	28 September 2003 (aged 20)	Casa Sports	2023		37	1
20	Rudik Mkrtchyan	(Armenia)	MF	26 October 1998 (aged 25)	Shirak	2021		90	5
23	Gor Malakyan	(Armenia)	MF	12 June 1994 (aged 29)	Pyunik	2021		93	4
25	Aleksandr Aleksanyan	(Armenia)	MF	14 November 2006 (aged 17)	Academy	2023		2	0
81	Kassim Hadji	(Comoros)	MF	23 March 2000 (aged 24)	Stade Nyonnais	2023		47	9
	Erik Azizyan	(Armenia)	MF	4 March 2000 (aged 24)	Unattached	2023		7	0
Forwards
7	Bertrand Mani	(Cameroon)	FW	25 May 1997 (aged 26)	Unattached	2023		29	2
9	Razmik Hakobyan	(Armenia)	FW	9 February 1996 (aged 28)	Alashkert	2018		108	13
15	Kalifala Doombia	(Mali)	FW	28 September 2004 (aged 19)	Gidars	2023		18	1
17	Ramses Donfack	(Cameroon)	FW	28 July 1998 (aged 25)	Coton Sport	2024		10	1
30	Ibeh Ransom	(Nigeria)	FW	29 June 2003 (aged 20)	Hapoel Nir Ramat HaSharon	2023		47	9
Players away on loan
Players who left during the season
3	Arsen Galstyan	(Armenia)	DF	1 May 2002 (aged 22)	Noah	2023		1	0
6	Gor Arakelyan	(Armenia)	DF	10 January 2003 (aged 21)	BKMA Yerevan	2023		0	0
7	Mohamed Kone	(Ivory Coast)	FW	7 August 2003 (aged 20)	Stade Lausanne Ouchy	2023		13	0
13	Arman Harutyunyan	(Armenia)	GK	5 March 2002 (aged 22)	Lernayin Artsakh	2023		4	0
22	Narek Hovhannisyan	(Russia)	GK	1 March 2000 (aged 24)	Syunik	2023		0	0
33	Hamlet Minasyan	(Armenia)	FW	15 January 2003 (aged 21)	BKMA Yerevan	2023		8	0
77	Georgi Babaliev	(Bulgaria)	FW	14 May 2001 (aged 23)	Spartak Varna	2023		20	0

== Transfers ==
=== In ===
Date	Position	Nationality	Name	From	Fee	Ref.
8 June 2023	DF	(Armenia)	Volodya Samsonyan	BKMA Yerevan	Undisclosed	
16 June 2023	GK	(Armenia)	Arman Harutyunyan	Lernayin Artsakh	Undisclosed	
1 July 2023	FW	(Armenia)	Armen Nahapetyan	Ararat-Armenia	Undisclosed	
17 July 2023	GK	(Armenia)	Narek Hovhannisyan	Syunik	Undisclosed	
18 July 2023	MF	(Tunisia)	Rayane Mzoughi	AS Gabès	Undisclosed	
25 July 2023	DF	(Armenia)	Arsen Galstyan	Noah	Undisclosed	
10 August 2023	DF	(Mali)	Malick Aziz Berte	Gidars	Undisclosed	
11 August 2023	FW	(Mali)	Kalifala Doombia	Gidars	Undisclosed	
12 August 2023	DF	(Ghana)	Clinton Dombila	JMG Academy	Undisclosed	
12 September 2023	FW	(Cameroon)	Bertrand Mani	Unattached	Free	
17 September 2023	MF	(France)	Clément Lhernault	AS Nancy	Undisclosed	
1 January 2024	DF	(Armenia)	Albert Khachumyan	Ararat-Armenia	Undisclosed	
1 January 2024	MF	(Armenia)	Artur Grigoryan	BKMA Yerevan	Undisclosed	
22 January 2024	GK	(Brazil)	Tiago Gomes	Bahia	Undisclosed	
23 February 2024	FW	(Cameroon)	Ramses Donfack	Coton Sport	Undisclosed	

=== Released ===
Date	Position	Nationality	Name	Joined	Date	Ref
20 June 2023	GK	(Armenia)	Gor Manukyan	West Armenia	28 July 2023	
20 June 2023	GK	(Russia)	Sergei Revyakin	Zhetysu	14 July 2023	
20 June 2023	DF	(Armenia)	Vardan Arzoyan	Van		
20 June 2023	DF	(Armenia)	Hayk Ishkhanyan	BKMA Yerevan		
20 June 2023	DF	(Armenia)	Hovhannes Nazaryan	Van		
20 June 2023	DF	(France)	Teddy Mézague	R.E. Virton	18 September 2023	
20 June 2023	DF	(Serbia)	Dušan Mijić	Dinamo Samarqand		
20 June 2023	MF	(Ivory Coast)	Armand Dagrou	ASEC Mimosas		
20 June 2023	MF	(Ivory Coast)	Sosthène Tiehide	Teungueth		
20 June 2023	FW	(Ivory Coast)	Amara Traoré	Muras United	20 July 2024	
22 June 2023	DF	(Armenia)	Arman Hovhannisyan	Pyunik	29 June 2023	
5 July 2023	DF	(Armenia)	Hrayr Mkoyan	Shirak		
31 December 2023	GK	(Armenia)	Arman Harutyunyan	West Armenia	1 February 2024	
31 December 2023	GK	(Armenia)	Narek Hovhannisyan	Noah		
31 December 2023	DF	(Armenia)	Gor Arakelyan	BKMA Yerevan	1 January 2024	
31 December 2023	DF	(Armenia)	Arsen Galstyan	Gandzasar Kapan	1 February 2024	
31 December 2023	FW	(Bulgaria)	Georgi Babaliev	Spartak Varna	15 January 2024	
31 December 2023	FW	(Ivory Coast)	Mohamed Kone	Saint-Dié	1 July 2024	
18 January 2024	FW	(Armenia)	Hamlet Minasyan	Syunik	15 February 2024	

== Friendlies ==
8 July 2023	Ararat Yerevan	4–1	West Armenia	Dzoraghbyur
11:00 (UTC+4)	Kone 35'; Mkrtchyan 45'; Mahmoud 48'; Trialist 35'	Report	Goal	Stadium: Dzoraghbyur Training Centre

15 July 2023	BKMA Yerevan	0–0	Ararat Yerevan	Yerevan
11:00 (UTC+4)		Report		Stadium: Yerevan Football Academy Stadium

19 July 2023	Ararat Yerevan	1–0	Van	Dzoraghbyur
11:30 (UTC+4)	Hadji 51'	Report		Stadium: Dzoraghbyur Training Centre

22 July 2023	Noah	1–1	Ararat Yerevan	Abovyan
11:00 (UTC+4)	67'	Report	Hakobyan 17'	Stadium: Abovyan City Stadium

20 January 2024	Ararat Yerevan	0–2	West Armenia	Dzoraghbyur
13:00 (UTC+4)		Report		Stadium: Dzoraghbyur Training Centre

27 January 2024	Ararat Yerevan	0–1	Van	Dzoraghbyur
13:00 (UTC+4)		Report	Hovhannisyan 45'	Stadium: Dzoraghbyur Training Centre

3 February 2024	Ararat Yerevan	3–0	Van	Dzoraghbyur
(UTC+4)	Ransom 28'; Hadji 54'; Doombia 72'	Report		Stadium: Dzoraghbyur Training Centre

10 February 2024	BKMA Yerevan	0–2	Ararat Yerevan	Yerevan
13:00 (UTC+4)		Report	Galstyan 33'; Mani 59'	Stadium: Yerevan Football Academy Stadium

13 February 2024	Shirak	0–0	Ararat Yerevan	Yerevan
12:00 (UTC+4)		Report		Stadium: Yerevan Football Academy Stadium

16 February 2024	Ararat Yerevan	0–0	Shirak	Yerevan
12:00 (UTC+4)		Report		Stadium: Yerevan Football Academy Stadium

== Competitions ==
=== Overview ===
Competition	First match	Last match	Starting round	Final position	Record							
Competition	First match	Last match	Starting round	Final position	Pld	W	D	L	GF	GA	GD	Win %
Premier League	30 July 2023	24 May 2024	Matchday 1	6th	36	14	5	17	39	50	−11	38.89
Armenian Cup	24 November 2023	24 November 2023	Second Round	Second Round	1	0	0	1	1	3	−2	0.00
Total					37	14	5	18	40	53	−13	37.84

Last updated: 24 May 2024
Source: Competitions

=== Premier League ===
==== Results summary ====
Overall								Home						Away					
Pld	W	D	L	GF	GA	GD	Pts	W	D	L	GF	GA	GD	W	D	L	GF	GA	GD
36	14	5	17	39	50	−11	47	7	2	9	13	23	−10	7	3	8	26	27	−1

Last updated: 24 May 2024.
Source: See Results

==== Results by round ====
Round	1	2	3	4	5	6	7	8	9	10	11	12	13	14	15	16	17	18	19	20	21	22	23	24	25	26	27	28	29	30	31	32	33	34	35	36
Ground	H	A	H	A	H	A	H	A	H	A	H	A	H	A	H	A	H	A	H	A	H	A	H	A	H	A	H	A	H	A	H	A	H	A	H	A
Result	L	D	W	W	L	L	W	L	D	L	L	W	W	L	L	W	L	L	L	D	W	W	W	L	W	L	D	L	L	W	D	W	L	W	L	D
Position	9	9	7	4	7	7	7	7	7	7	7	6	6	6	6	6	6	6	7	7	6	6	6	6	6	6	6	6	6	6	6	6	6	5	6	6

Updated to match(es) played on 24 May 2024. Source: See Results
A = Away; H = Home; W = Win; D = Draw; L = Loss

==== Results ====
30 July 2023 1	Ararat Yerevan	1–3	Ararat-Armenia	Yerevan
20:00 (UTC+4)	da Silva 18' (o.g.); Mzoughi (yellow card) 45+1'; Malakyan (yellow card) 88'	Report	Hakobyan (yellow card) 45'; Gbomadu 63'; Bueno (yellow card) 72'; Yenne 82', 90+5'	Stadium: Republican Stadium; Referee: Vardan Manukyan

6 August 2023 2	Pyunik	1–1	Ararat Yerevan	Abovyan
19:00 (UTC+4)	Villela 7' (yellow card) 62'; Baranov (yellow card) 25'	Report	Ransom 5' (pen.); Mahmoud (yellow card) 45+3'; Mzoughi (yellow card) 79'	Stadium: City Stadium; Referee: Artem Gasparyan

12 August 2023 3	Ararat Yerevan	1–0	West Armenia	Yerevan
19:00 (UTC+4)	Ufuoma 21' (o.g.); Nahapetyan (yellow card) 74'; Faye (yellow card) 88'; Malakyan (yellow card) 90+4'	Report	Dziov (yellow card) 67'; Karapetyan (yellow card) 77'; Tarasenko (yellow card) 90+3'	Stadium: Republican Stadium; Referee: Zaven Hovhannisyan

19 August 2023 4	Van	1–2	Ararat Yerevan	Charentsavan
17:00 (UTC+4)	Cifuentes (yellow card) 53'; Ojetunde (yellow card) 55'; B.Hovhannisyan 86'; Meliksetyan (yellow card) 90'; N.Hovhannisyan (yellow card) 90+5'	Report	Mahmoud 19'; Galstyan (yellow card) 38'; Faye (yellow card) 39'; Hakobyan (yellow card) 61'; Hadji (yellow card) 70' (goal) 74'	Stadium: City Stadium; Referee: Vardan Manukyan

25 August 2023 5	Ararat Yerevan	0–2	BKMA Yerevan	Yerevan
19:00 (UTC+4)	Mzoughi (yellow card) 61'; Samsonyan (yellow card) 90+2'	Report	Simonyan 23'; M.Hakobyan 90+4'	Stadium: Republican Stadium; Referee: Henrik Nalbandian

31 August 2023 6	Noah	3–0	Ararat Yerevan	Armavir
20:00 (UTC+4)	Gladon 2', 70'; Miljković 21'	Report	Galstyan (yellow card) 45+1'; Mzoughi (red card) 59'; Hadji (yellow card) 81'	Stadium: City Stadium; Referee: Yura Mahtesyan

14 September 2023 7	Ararat Yerevan	2–1	Shirak	Yerevan
19:00 (UTC+4)	Faye (yellow card) 28'; Hadji 30'; Hakobyan 45+3'; Mahmoud (yellow card) 52'; Babaliev (yellow card) 77'; Harutyunyan (yellow card) 90+4'	Report	Misakyan 19'; Vidić (yellow card) 84'; Mkoyan (yellow card) 86'	Stadium: Republican Stadium; Referee: Sargis Khachatryan

20 September 2023 8	Alashkert	2–1	Ararat Yerevan	Yerevan
14:00 (UTC+4)	Fatai 9'; Wbeymar (yellow card) 39'; Mimito (yellow card) 46'; Kutalia 68'; Gareginyan (yellow card) 78'	Report	Faye 34'	Stadium: Alashkert Stadium; Referee: Yura Mahtesyan

24 September 2023 9	Ararat Yerevan	1–1	Urartu	Yerevan
18:00 (UTC+4)	Samsonyan (yellow card) 9'; Ransom (yellow card) 37'; Hakobyan 39'; Harutyunyan (yellow card) 71'	Report	Dzhikiya 10'; Salou (yellow card) 22'; Sanogo (yellow card) 80'	Stadium: Republican Stadium; Referee: Henrik Nalbandian

29 September 2023 10	Ararat-Armenia	2–1	Ararat Yerevan	Yerevan
17:00 (UTC+4)	Yattara 25'; Ambartsumyan (yellow card) 31'; Gbomadu 81'	Report	Moustapha (yellow card) 72'; Nahapetyan 87'	Stadium: FFA Stadium; Referee: Sargis Khachatryan

4 October 2023 11	Ararat Yerevan	0–5	Pyunik	Yerevan
17:00 (UTC+4)	Malakyan (yellow card) 67'	Report	Kovalenko 10'; Caraballo 38'; Gonçalves (yellow card) 50' (goal) 71'; Malakyan 59'; Marmentini 86'	Stadium: Republican Stadium; Referee: Yura Mahtesyan

19 October 2023 12	West Armenia	0–2	Ararat Yerevan	Yerevan
15:00 (UTC+4)	Khachatryan (yellow card) 51'	Report	Mkrtchyan (yellow card) 10'; Ransom (yellow card) 53'; Nahapetyan 57' (pen.); Lhernault 68'; Lemajic (yellow card) 85'	Stadium: Junior Sport Stadium; Referee: Ashot Ghaltakhchyan

24 October 2023 13	Ararat Yerevan	2–1	Van	Yerevan
18:00 (UTC+4)	Faye (yellow card) 50'; Hakobyan (yellow card) 52'; S.Galstyan (yellow card) 52'; Mani 62'; Lhernault 68' (yellow card) 82'	Report	Boniface 24' (pen.); Dosa (yellow card) 54' (yellow-red card) 60'	Stadium: Republican Stadium; Referee: Artem Gasparyan

29 October 2023 14	BKMA Yerevan	2–0	Ararat Yerevan	Yerevan
17:00 (UTC+4)	A.Petrosyan 47'; Sargsyan 78'; Alaverdyan (yellow card) 88'	Report	Mkrtchyan (yellow card) 52'; Malakyan (yellow card) 76'; Samsonyan (yellow card) 78'; Hakobyan (yellow card) 86'	Stadium: FFA Stadium; Referee: Henrik Nalbandian

3 November 2023 15	Ararat Yerevan	0–2	Noah	Yerevan
18:00 (UTC+4)	Mani (yellow card) 36'; Lhernault (yellow card) 39'; Faye (yellow card) 64'; Nahapetyan (yellow card) 74'	Report	Muradyan (yellow card) 19'; Gladon (yellow card) 40'; Gamboš 44'; Llovet 78' (yellow card) 90+1'	Stadium: Republican Stadium; Referee: Zaven Hovhannisyan

8 November 2023 16	Shirak	1–2	Ararat Yerevan	Gyumri
16:00 (UTC+4)	Kodia 72'; Doh (yellow card) 90+6'	Report	Lhernault 14'; Hakobyan (red card) 19'; Hadji 74'; Berte (yellow card) 90+1'; Mani (yellow card) 90+3'; Lemajic (yellow card) 90+5'; Samsonyan (red card) 90+6'	Stadium: City Stadium; Referee: Vardan Manukyan

12 November 2023 17	Ararat Yerevan	0–1	Alashkert	Yerevan
18:00 (UTC+4)	Ransom (yellow card) 24'; Moustapha (yellow card) 34'; Galstyan (yellow card) 53'; Mahmoud (yellow card) 82'; Lhernault (yellow card) 87'	Report	Carrillo (yellow card) 35'; Wbeymar (yellow card) 38'; Kutalia 44' (pen.); Gareginyan (yellow card) 52'; Kocharyan (yellow card) 87'; Mužek (yellow card) 90+3'	Stadium: Republican Stadium; Referee: Henrik Nalbandian

29 November 2023 18	Urartu	2–1	Ararat Yerevan	Yerevan
18:00 (UTC+4)	Sanogo 10'; Piloyan (yellow card) 43'; Maksimenko 81'	Report	Mani 29'; Minasyan (yellow card) 90'	Stadium: Urartu Stadium; Referee: Zaven Hovhannisyan

5 December 2023 19	Ararat Yerevan	0–1	Ararat-Armenia	Yerevan
16:00 (UTC+4)	Malakyan (yellow card) 36'	Report	Yattara 4'; Alemão (yellow card) 38'	Stadium: Republican Stadium; Referee: Ashot Harutyunyan

11 December 2023 20	Pyunik	1–1	Ararat Yerevan	Yerevan
14:00 (UTC+4)	Gonçalves 1'; Davidyan (yellow card) 40'; James (yellow card) 60'; Bravo 86'	Report	Moustapha 5', 55'; Hadji (yellow card) 66'; Faye (yellow card) 83'; Minasyan	Stadium: Junior Sports Stadium; Referee: Zaven Hovhannisyan

24 February 2024 21	Ararat Yerevan	1–0	West Armenia	Yerevan
17:00 (UTC+4)	Ransom 59' (pen.)	Report	Okoronkwo (yellow card) 62'; Tarasenko (yellow card) 65'; Metoyan (yellow card) 85'	Stadium: Republican Stadium; Referee: Zaven Hovhannisyan

28 February 2024 22	Van	0–2	Ararat Yerevan	Charentsavan
15:00 (UTC+4)	Kojcic (yellow card) 89'; Manucharyan (yellow card) 90+4'	Report	Mkrtchyan 21' (yellow card) 61'; Malakyan (yellow card) 45+3'; Khachumyan (yellow card) 49'; Hadji 80'	Stadium: City Stadium; Referee: Ashot Harutyunyan

3 March 2024 23	Ararat Yerevan	1–0	BKMA Yerevan	Yerevan
18:00 (UTC+4)	Ransom 56' (pen.); Khachumyan (yellow card) 76'; Mani (yellow card) 84'; Berte (yellow card) 90+5'; Hadji (yellow card) 90+9'	Report	Nikoghosyan (yellow card) 87'	Stadium: Republican Stadium; Referee: Artak Vardanyan

7 March 2024 24	Noah	4–3	Ararat Yerevan	Armavir
18:00 (UTC+4)	Maia 7'; Miranyan 26', 35'; Mathieu 29'; Malembana (yellow card) 31'; Alhaft (yellow card) 38'	Report	S.Galstyan 18' (yellow card) 41'; Nahapetyan 72'; Ransom 79'; Dombila (yellow card) 87'	Stadium: City Stadium; Referee: Vardan Manukyan

15 March 2024 25	Ararat Yerevan	2–0	Shirak	Abovyan
17:00 (UTC+4)	Hadji 13', 90'	Report	Mkoyan (yellow card) 17'; Kone (yellow card) 48'; Urushanyan (yellow card) 73'	Stadium: City Stadium; Referee: Ashot Ghaltakhchyan

30 March 2024 26	Alashkert	2–1	Ararat Yerevan	Yerevan
15:00 (UTC+4)	Marmentini 27', 39' (pen.); Wbeymar (yellow card) 80'; Paramonov (yellow card) 89'; Sokhiyev (yellow card) 90+3'	Report	Khachumyan (yellow card) 7'; Moustapha (yellow card) 37'; Donfack 70'	Stadium: Alashkert Stadium; Referee: Hovhannes Kalantaryan

3 April 2024 27	Ararat Yerevan	0–0	Urartu	Yerevan
19:00 (UTC+4)		Report	Dolgov (yellow card) 54'; Simonyan (yellow card) 57'; Veliez (yellow card) 85'	Stadium: Republican Stadium; Referee: Artem Gasparyan

12 April 2024 28	Ararat-Armenia	2–1	Ararat Yerevan	Yerevan
19:00 (UTC+4)	Avetisyan (yellow card) 52'; Yattara 59' (pen.); Rodríguez 88'	Report	Moustapha (yellow card) 26'; Grigoryan 45+2'; Mani (yellow card) 54'; Khachumyan (yellow card) 80'; Ransom (yellow card) 90+9'	Stadium: FFA Stadium; Referee: Henrik Nalbandian

17 April 2024 29	Ararat Yerevan	0–1	Pyunik	Yerevan
17:00 (UTC+4)	Mani (yellow card) 47'; Mahmoud (yellow card) 85'	Report	Bravo (yellow card) 30'; Otubanjo 56'	Stadium: Republican Stadium; Referee: Ashot Ghaltakhchyan

22 April 2024 30	West Armenia	1–2	Ararat Yerevan	Yerevan
17:00 (UTC+4)	Isaac 71'; Sargsyan (yellow card) 84'; Shahinyan (yellow card) 86'	Report	Faye (yellow card) 18'; Hadji 88' (pen.); Ransom 90+2' (pen.)	Stadium: Junior Sports Stadium; Referee: Zaven Hovhannisyan

26 April 2024 31	Ararat Yerevan	1–1	Van	Yerevan
19:00 (UTC+4)	Faye (yellow card) 25'; Moustapha 66'	Report	Hovhannisyan 50'; Manucharyan (yellow card) 60'; Kojcic (yellow card) 65'	Stadium: Republican Stadium; Referee: Ashot Ghaltakhchyan

3 May 2024 32	BKMA Yerevan	1–3	Ararat Yerevan	Yerevan
17:00 (UTC+4)	E.Vardanyan 34'; Aghbalyan (yellow card) 68'	Report	Samsonyan (yellow card) 32'; Ransom 53' (pen.); Khachumyan (yellow card) 56'; Galstyan 63', 74'; Berte (yellow card) 82'	Stadium: FFA Stadium; Referee: Yura Mahtesyan

9 May 2024 33	Ararat Yerevan	0–1	Noah	Yerevan
19:00 (UTC+4)	Donfack (yellow card) 44'; Mani (yellow card) 90+7'	Report	Miranyan 7'; Miljković (yellow card) 78'	Stadium: Republican Stadium; Referee: Zaven Hovhannisyan

15 May 2024 34	Shirak	0–1	Ararat Yerevan	Gyumri
19:00 (UTC+4)	Darbinyan (yellow card) 60'; Vidić (yellow card) 73'	Report	Malakyan 48'; Hadji (yellow card) 75'; Faye (yellow card) 75'; Mzoughi (yellow card) 90+3'	Stadium: City Stadium; Referee: Yura Mahtesyan

20 May 2024 35	Ararat Yerevan	1–3	Alashkert	Yerevan
19:00 (UTC+4)	Moustapha 64' (yellow card) 69'	Report	Chiteishvili 45+2'; Nalbandyan 45+4', 58'; Khurtsidze (yellow card) 45+7'	Stadium: Republican Stadium; Referee: Yura Mahtesyan

24 May 2024 36	Urartu	1–1	Ararat Yerevan	Yerevan
19:00 (UTC+4)	Melkonyan (yellow card) 45+2'; Tarakhchyan 61' (pen.); Gilmore (yellow card) 77'	Report	Grigoryan (yellow card) 6'; Mzoughi (yellow card) 51'; Doombia (yellow card) 62' (goal) 66'	Stadium: Urartu Stadium; Referee: Hovhannes Kalantaryan

==== League table ====
Pos	Team	Pld	W	D	L	GF	GA	GD	Pts	Qualification or relegation
1	Pyunik (C)	36	24	10	2	84	28	+56	82	Qualification for the Champions League first qualifying round
2	Noah	36	26	2	8	69	33	+36	80	Qualification for the Conference League first qualifying round
3	Ararat-Armenia	36	23	6	7	73	34	+39	75	Qualification for the Conference League second qualifying round (Note: Ararat-Armenia qualified for the Conference League second qualifying round by winning the 2023–24 Armenian Cup. Since they qualified based on league position, the second Conference League first round spot was passed to the fourth-placed team.)
4	Urartu	36	13	11	12	49	49	0	50	Qualification for the Conference League first qualifying round
5	Alashkert	36	13	6	17	54	56	−2	45	
6	Ararat Yerevan	36	13	6	17	39	50	−11	45	
7	West Armenia	36	11	4	21	43	73	−30	37	
8	Shirak	36	8	9	19	28	46	−18	33	
9	Van	36	8	8	20	32	67	−35	32	
10	BKMA	36	7	6	23	32	67	−35	27	

Source: FFA Soccerway
Rules for classification: 1) Points; 2) Head-to-head points; 3) Head-to-head goal difference; 4) Head-to-head goals scored; 5) Matches won; 6) Goal difference; 7) Less red cards; 8) Less yellow cards; 9) Fair-play ranking 10) Draw
(C) Champions

=== Armenian Cup ===
24 November 2023 Second Round	Pyunik	3–1 (a.e.t.)	Ararat Yerevan	Yerevan
14:00 (UTC+4)	Malakyan 44' (pen.); Ravanelli (yellow card) 65'; Harutyunyan 93' (pen.); Hendriks 105+1'	Report	Ransom (yellow card) 21'; Mahmoud 24'; Mani (yellow card) 33'; Hakobyan (yellow card) 58'; Mkrtchyan (yellow card) 65'	Stadium: Junior Sports Stadium; Referee: Zaven Hovhannisyan

== Squad statistics ==
As of match played 24 May 2024

=== Appearances and goals ===
No.	Pos	Nat	Player	Total		Premier League		Armenian Cup	
No.	Pos	Nat	Player	Apps	Goals	Apps	Goals	Apps	Goals
1	GK	(Brazil) BRA	Tiago Gomes	16	0	16	0	0	0
2	DF	(Tunisia) TUN	Ayman Mahmoud	24	2	22+1	1	1	1
3	DF	(Armenia) ARM	Albert Khachumyan	14	0	14	0	0	0
4	DF	(Armenia) ARM	Volodya Samsonyan	29	0	27+1	0	1	0
7	FW	(Cameroon) CMR	Bertrand Mani	30	2	11+18	2	1	0
8	MF	(France) FRA	Clément Lhernault	17	3	11+5	3	1	0
9	FW	(Armenia) ARM	Razmik Hakobyan	29	2	14+14	2	1	0
10	MF	(Armenia) ARM	Artur Grigoryan	16	1	16	1	0	0
11	MF	(Armenia) ARM	Armen Nahapetyan	21	3	7+14	3	0	0
12	DF	(Ghana) GHA	Clinton Dombila	13	0	8+5	0	0	0
14	MF	(Tunisia) TUN	Rayane Mzoughi	25	0	19+6	0	0	0
15	FW	(Mali) MLI	Kalifala Doombia	18	1	3+14	1	0+1	0
17	FW	(Cameroon) CMR	Ramses Donfack	10	1	4+6	1	0	0
18	DF	(Mali) MLI	Malick Berte	22	0	19+2	0	1	0
19	MF	(Senegal) SEN	Alassane Faye	28	1	19+8	1	0+1	0
20	MF	(Armenia) ARM	Rudik Mkrtchyan	29	1	21+7	1	1	0
21	DF	(Armenia) ARM	Serob Galstyan	36	3	29+6	3	0+1	0
23	MF	(Armenia) ARM	Gor Malakyan	32	1	29+2	1	1	0
24	DF	(Cameroon) CMR	Hadji Issa Moustapha	31	4	25+5	4	1	0
25	MF	(Armenia) ARM	Aleksandr Aleksanyan	2	0	0+2	0	0	0
30	FW	(Nigeria) NGR	Ibeh Ransom	33	6	28+4	6	1	0
81	MF	(Comoros) COM	Kassim Hadji	33	7	29+4	7	0	0
98	GK	(Montenegro) MNE	Nemanja Lemajic	17	0	16	0	1	0
Players away on loan:
Players who left Ararat Yerevan during the season:
3	DF	(Armenia) ARM	Arsen Galstyan	1	0	0+1	0	0	0
7	FW	(Ivory Coast) CIV	Mohamed Kone	4	0	1+2	0	0+1	0
10	MF	(Armenia) ARM	Erik Azizyan	4	0	0+4	0	0	0
13	GK	(Armenia) ARM	Arman Harutyunyan	4	0	4	0	0	0
33	FW	(Armenia) ARM	Hamlet Minasyan	8	0	0+7	0	0+1	0
77	FW	(Bulgaria) BUL	Georgi Babaliev	11	0	4+7	0	0	0

=== Goal scorers ===
Place	Position	Nation	Number	Name	Premier League	Armenian Cup	Total
1	MF	(Comoros)	81	Kassim Hadji	7	0	7
2	FW	(Nigeria)	30	Ibeh Ransom	6	0	6
3	DF	(Cameroon)	24	Hadji Issa Moustapha	4	0	4
4	MF	(France)	8	Clément Lhernault	3	0	3
4	MF	(Armenia)	11	Armen Nahapetyan	3	0	3
4	DF	(Armenia)	21	Serob Galstyan	3	0	3
7	FW	(Armenia)	9	Razmik Hakobyan	2	0	2
7	FW	(Cameroon)	7	Bertrand Mani	2	0	2
7	DF	(Tunisia)	2	Ayman Mahmoud	1	1	2
7				Own goal	2	0	2
11	MF	(Senegal)	19	Alassane Faye	1	0	1
11	MF	(Armenia)	20	Rudik Mkrtchyan	1	0	1
11	FW	(Cameroon)	17	Ramses Donfack	1	0	1
11	MF	(Armenia)	10	Artur Grigoryan	1	0	1
11	MF	(Armenia)	23	Gor Malakyan	1	0	1
11	FW	(Mali)	15	Kalifala Doombia	1	0	1
				TOTALS	39	1	40

=== Clean sheets ===
Place	Position	Nation	Number	Name	Premier League	Armenian Cup	Total
1	GK	(Brazil)	1	Tiago Gomes	6	0	6
2	GK	(Montenegro)	98	Nemanja Lemajic	2	0	2
				TOTALS	8	0	8

=== Disciplinary record ===
Number	Nation	Position	Name	Premier League		Armenian Cup		Total	
Number	Nation	Position	Name	Yellow card	Red card	Yellow card	Red card	Yellow card	Red card
2	(Tunisia)	DF	Ayman Mahmoud	4	0	0	0	4	0
3	(Armenia)	DF	Albert Khachumyan	5	0	0	0	5	0
4	(Armenia)	DF	Volodya Samsonyan	4	1	0	0	4	1
7	(Cameroon)	FW	Bertrand Mani	6	0	1	0	7	0
8	(France)	MF	Clément Lhernault	3	0	0	0	3	0
9	(Armenia)	FW	Razmik Hakobyan	3	1	1	0	4	1
10	(Armenia)	MF	Artur Grigoryan	1	0	0	0	1	0
11	(Armenia)	MF	Armen Nahapetyan	2	0	0	0	2	0
12	(Ghana)	DF	Clinton Dombila	2	0	0	0	2	0
14	(Tunisia)	MF	Rayane Mzoughi	5	1	0	0	5	1
15	(Mali)	FW	Kalifala Doombia	1	0	0	0	1	0
17	(Cameroon)	FW	Ramses Donfack	1	0	0	0	1	0
18	(Mali)	DF	Malick Berte	3	0	0	0	3	0
19	(Senegal)	MF	Alassane Faye	9	0	0	0	9	0
20	(Armenia)	MF	Rudik Mkrtchyan	3	0	1	0	4	0
21	(Armenia)	DF	Serob Galstyan	5	0	0	0	5	0
23	(Armenia)	MF	Gor Malakyan	6	0	0	0	6	0
24	(Cameroon)	DF	Hadji Issa Moustapha	5	0	0	0	5	0
30	(Nigeria)	FW	Ibeh Ransom	4	0	1	0	5	0
81	(Comoros)	MF	Kassim Hadji	5	0	0	0	5	0
98	(Montenegro)	GK	Nemanja Lemajic	2	0	0	0	2	0
Players away on loan:
Players who left Ararat Yerevan during the season:
13	(Armenia)	GK	Arman Harutyunyan	2	0	0	0	2	0
33	(Armenia)	FW	Hamlet Minasyan	2	0	0	0	2	0
77	(Bulgaria)	FW	Georgi Babaliev	1	0	0	0	1	0
			TOTALS	83	3	4	0	87	3
