= 2026–27 FC Ararat Yerevan season =

Ararat Yerevan
2026–27 season
- President: Hrach Kaprielian
- Manager: Karen Barseghyan
- Stadium: Republican Stadium
- Premier League: 8th
- Armenian Cup: Round of 16
- Top goalscorer: League: Two Players (2); All: Two Players (2)
Home colours	Away colours	Third colours

The 2026–27 season is FC Ararat Yerevan's 36th consecutive season in the Armenian Premier League, where they also competed in the Armenian Cup.

== Season overview ==
On 27 June, Ararat announced the appointment of Karen Barseghyan as their new head coach.

On 1 July, Ararat announced the signing of Arman Khachatryan from Gandzasar.

On 2 July, Ararat announced the signing of Benik Hovhannisyan from Van.

On 6 July, Ararat announced the signing of Narek Alaverdyan from Ararat-Armenia.

On 7 July, Ararat announced the signing of free-agent Varazdat Haroyan.

On 13 July, Ararat announced the signing of Nikita Lobusov from Gandzasar.

On 14 July, Ararat announced the signing of Petros Alekyan on loan from Pyunik.

On 26 July, Ararat announced the signing of Edgar Movsesyan from Chania City.

== Squad ==
As of match played 7 November 2026

Number	Name	Nationality	Position	Date of birth (age)	Signed from	Signed in	Contract ends	Apps.	Goals
Goalkeepers
1	Adel Anzimati	(Comoros)	GK	5 November 2001 (age 25)	Martigues	2025		38	0
13	Nikita Lobusov	(Russia)	GK	4 August 2002 (age 24)	Gandzasar	2026		2	0
Defenders
3	Albert Khachumyan	(Armenia)	DF	23 June 1999 (age 27)	Ararat-Armenia	2024		78	1
4	Volodya Samsonyan	(Armenia)	DF	24 February 2001 (age 25)	BKMA Yerevan	2023		77	0
18	Malick Berte	(Mali)	DF	24 February 2004 (age 22)	Guidars	2023		66	0
19	Souleymane Touré	(Mali)	DF	26 January 2007 (age 19)	Motema Pembe	2026		6	0
30	Aram Aslanyan	(Armenia)	DF	17 March 2005 (age 21)	Academy	2023		35	1
32	Divine Ukadike	(Nigeria)	DF	14 August 2004 (age 22)	Golden Boot	2026		10	1
33	Varazdat Haroyan	(Armenia)	DF	24 August 1992 (age 34)	Unattached	2026		8	1
55	Guy Lima	(Senegal)	DF	7 October 2006 (age 20)	United Académie	2025		23	1
	Ernest Kacou	(Ivory Coast)	DF	28 November 2005 (age 20)	Abidjan City	2025		6	0
Midfielders
6	Okuchukwu Chukwu	(Nigeria)	MF	7 May 2007 (age 19)	Golden Boot	2026		18	1
8	Petros Alekyan	(Armenia)	MF	25 December 2005 (age 20)	on loan from Pyunik	2026		14	1
9	Benik Hovhannisyan	(Armenia)	MF	1 May 1993 (age 33)	Van	2026		35	2
10	Artur Grigoryan	(Armenia)	MF	10 July 1993 (age 33)	Pyunik	2025		74	1
11	Narek Alaverdyan	(Armenia)	MF	19 February 2002 (age 24)	Ararat-Armenia	2026		12	0
17	Edgar Movsesyan	(Armenia)	MF	9 September 1998 (age 28)	Chania City	2026		13	1
21	Gagik Simonyan	(Armenia)	MF	8 March 2006 (age 20)	Academy	2023		7	0
25	Aboubacar Ouattara	(Ivory Coast)	MF	10 July 1993 (age 33)	Leader Foot Academie	2025		28	3
38	Moussa Kante	(Ivory Coast)	MF	19 August 2005 (age 21)	Bokakokore Academy	2024		53	5
42	Mohamed Fofana	(Ivory Coast)	MF	20 December 2005 (age 20)	Zoman	2025		36	0
70	Alen Mkrtchyan	(Armenia)	MF	17 August 2006 (age 20)	Academy	2023		8	0
77	Aleksandr Aleksanyan	(Armenia)	MF	14 November 2006 (age 19)	Academy	2023		23	0
Forwards
7	Patrick Handzongo	(Cameroon)	FW	9 September 2004 (aged 21)	Colombe Sportive du Dja	2025		34	4
20	Adama Meite	(Ivory Coast)	FW	20 April 2004 (aged 22)	JMG Djekanou Academy	2025		25	1
94	Sindou Bakayoko	(Ivory Coast)	FW	25 December 2005 (age 20)	SOL FC d'Abobo	2026		8	2
97	Vardan Karapetyan	(Armenia)	FW	29 September 2008 (age 18)	Mika	2026		2	0
Players away on loan
Players who left during the season
14	Arman Khachatryan	(Armenia)	DF	9 June 1997 (age 29)	Gandzasar	2026		3	0

== Transfers ==
=== In ===
Date	Position	Nationality	Name	From	Fee	Ref.
1 July 2026	DF	(Armenia)	Arman Khachatryan	Gandzasar	Undisclosed	
2 July 2026	MF	(Armenia)	Benik Hovhannisyan	Van	Undisclosed	
6 July 2026	MF	(Armenia)	Narek Alaverdyan	Ararat-Armenia	Undisclosed	
7 July 2026	DF	(Armenia)	Varazdat Haroyan	Unattached	Free	
13 July 2026	GK	(Russia)	Nikita Lobusov	Gandzasar	Undisclosed	
26 July 2026	MF	(Armenia)	Edgar Movsesyan	Chania City	Undisclosed	

=== Loans in ===
Date from	Position	Nationality	Name	From	Date to	Ref.
14 July 2026	MF	(Armenia)	Petros Alekyan	Pyunik	30 June 2027	

=== Released ===
Date	Position	Nationality	Name	Joined	Date	Ref
3 July 2026	DF	(Armenia)	Artur Kartashyan	Van	29 July 2026	
23 July 2026	FW	(Nigeria)	Prince Obinna	Van	29 July 2026	

== Friendlies ==
3 October 2026	Ararat Yerevan	0–4	Ararat-Armenia	Yerevan
(UTC+4)		Report	Banjaqui 15'; Hambardzumyan 23'; Felipe 34'; Ndour 47'

== Competitions ==
=== Overview ===
Competition	First match	Last match	Starting round	Final position	Record							
Competition	First match	Last match	Starting round	Final position	Pld	W	D	L	GF	GA	GD	Win %
Premier League	1 August 2026		Matchday 1		13	3	2	8	10	21	−11	23.08
Armenian Cup	27 October 2026	27 October 2026	Round of 16	Round of 16	1	0	0	1	2	6	−4	0.00
Total					14	3	2	9	12	27	−15	21.43

Last updated: 7 November 2026
Source: Competitions

=== Premier League ===
==== Results summary ====
Overall								Home						Away					
Pld	W	D	L	GF	GA	GD	Pts	W	D	L	GF	GA	GD	W	D	L	GF	GA	GD
13	3	2	8	10	21	−11	11	0	1	4	2	8	−6	3	1	4	8	13	−5

Last updated: 7 November 2026.
Source: See Results

==== Results by round ====
Round	1	2	3	4	5	6	7	8	9	10	11	12	13
Ground	A	H	A	H	A	H	A	A	A	H	A	H	A
Result	L	L	W	L	L	L	W	W	D	D	L	L	L
Position	11	10	9	9	10	10	9	8	8	8	8	9	

Updated to match(es) played on 7 November 2026. Source: See Results
A = Away; H = Home; W = Win; D = Draw; L = Loss; P = Bye

==== Results ====
3 August 2026 1	Alashkert	3–0	Ararat Yerevan	Yerevan
20:00 (UTC+4)	Ejike (yellow card) 35'; Nalbandyan 54' (pen.); Jesus (yellow card) 72'; Massoumou 75', 78'; Agbalyan (yellow card) 90'	Report	Chukwu (yellow card) 24'; Fofana (yellow card) 31'; Berte (yellow card) 53'; Khachumyan (yellow card) 90+3'	Stadium: Academy Stadium; Referee: Yura Mahtesyan

7 August 2026 2	Ararat Yerevan	1–2	Sardarapat	Yerevan
19:00 (UTC+4)	Alaverdyan (yellow card) 37'; Haroyan 79' (yellow card) 90+5'	Report	Abrahamyan (yellow card) 14'; Vardanyan 20'; Petrosyan 28' (yellow card) 75'; Quiñónez (yellow card) 85'	Stadium: Republican Stadium; Referee: David Mkrtchyan

15 August 2026 3	BKMA Yerevan	1–2	Ararat Yerevan	Yerevan
19:30 (UTC+4)	Davtyan (yellow card) 5'; Harutyunyan 43'	Report	Alekyan 36'; Handzongo 53'	Stadium: Academy Stadium; Referee: Zaven Hovhannisyan

21 August 2026 4	Ararat Yerevan	0–2	Pyunik	Yerevan
19:00 (UTC+4)	Aslanyan (yellow card) 45+1'; Haroyan (red card) 55'; Berte (yellow card) 90'; Chukwu (yellow card) 90+8'; Alaverdyan (yellow card) 90+9'	Report	Hovhannisyan (yellow card) 24'; Pikis (yellow card) 55'; Harutyunyan (yellow card) 79'; Tarakhchyan 90+3'; Afyan 90+12'	Stadium: Republican Stadium; Referee: Vardan Vardumyan

30 August 2026 5	Noah	4–0	Ararat Yerevan	Abovyan
20:00 (UTC+4)	Ferreira 20', 31'; Costache (yellow card) 45'; Manvelyan 45+2'; Khudaverdyan 68'	Report	Berte (yellow card) 23'; Samsonyan (yellow card) 45'; Khachumyan (yellow card) 45'; Chukwu (yellow card) 55'	Stadium: Vahagn Tumasyan Stadium; Referee: Ashot Ghaltakhchyan

5 September 2026 6	Ararat Yerevan	0–1	Ararat-Armenia	Yerevan
19:00 (UTC+4)	Haroyan (yellow card) 36'; Chukwu (yellow card) 63'	Report	Benny (yellow card) 43'; Lima 47'; Shaghoyan (yellow card) 86'; Ambartsumyan (yellow card) 90+6'	Stadium: Republican Stadium; Referee: Tiran Yeritsyan

12 September 2026 7	Gandzasar	0–2	Ararat Yerevan	Yerevan
18:00 (UTC+4)	Robson (yellow card) 63'; Doumbia (yellow card) 85'	Report	Movsesyan 5' (pen.); Haroyan (yellow card) 38'; Lima (yellow card) 63'; Bakayoko (yellow card) 90+3'; Moussa Kante 90+5'	Stadium: Junior Sport Stadium; Referee: Yura Mahtesyan

20 September 2026 8	Syunik	0–1	Ararat Yerevan	Sisian
16:00 (UTC+4)	Galstyan (yellow card) 85'	Report	Bakayoko 77'; Hovhannisyan (yellow card) 90+2'	Stadium: City Stadium; Referee: Zaven Hovhannisyan

11 October 2026 9	Urartu	2–2	Ararat Yerevan	Yerevan
20:00 (UTC+4)	Ishibashi 35'; Lulukyan 79'	Report	Aslanyan 12'; Samsonyan (yellow card) 19'; Bakayoko 87'	Stadium: Urartu Stadium; Referee: Artem Gasparyan

17 October 2026 10	Ararat Yerevan	1–1	Shirak	Yerevan
20:00 (UTC+4)	Samsonyan (yellow card) 17'; Handzongo 41'; Anzimati (yellow card) 75'; Khachumyan (yellow card) 80'; Lima (yellow card) 86'; Moussa Kante (yellow card) 90+5'	Report	Mnatsakanyan 69'; Tsarukyan (yellow card) 74'; Sumbulyan (yellow card) 80'; Sargsyan (yellow card) 83'; Mkrtchyan (yellow card) 85'; Darbinyan (yellow card) 87'; Ghumashyan (yellow card) 90+4'	Stadium: Republican Stadium; Referee: Artak Vardanyan

23 October 2026 11	Van	2–1	Ararat Yerevan	Charentsavan
15:30 (UTC+4)	Voskanyan (yellow card) 21'; Nascimento 40'; Lweendo (yellow card) 45'; Gaba 67'; Silva (yellow card) 86'; Makhsudyan (yellow card) 90+4'	Report	Chukwu 27'; Handzongo (yellow card) 30'	Stadium: City Stadium; Referee: Zaven Hovhannisyan

31 October 2026 12	Ararat Yerevan	0–2	Alashkert	Yerevan
20:00 (UTC+4)	Handzongo (yellow card) 51'; Haroyan (yellow card) 53'; Anzimati (yellow card) 58'; Chukwu (yellow card) 61'	Report	Rafael 63'; Massoumou 90+3'; Piloyan (yellow card) 90+5'	Stadium: Republican Stadium; Referee: Henrik Nalbandian

7 November 2026 13	Sardarapat	1–0	Ararat Yerevan	Armavir
15:00 (UTC+4)	Vardanyan 7'; Seri (yellow card) 63'; Quiñónez (yellow card) 83'; Budagyan (yellow card) 89'	Report	Haroyan (yellow card) 58'; Khachumyan (yellow card) 89'	Stadium: Hakob Tonoyan Stadium; Referee: Ashot Ghaltakhchyan

21 November 2026 14	Ararat Yerevan	–	BKMA Yerevan	Yerevan
19:00 (UTC+4)		Report		Stadium: Republican Stadium

==== League table ====
Pos	Team	Pld	W	D	L	GF	GA	GD	Pts	Qualification or relegation
1	Noah	13	11	1	1	32	10	+22	34	Qualification for the Champions League first qualifying round
2	Pyunik	13	9	4	0	31	9	+22	31	Qualification for the Conference League second qualifying round
3	Ararat-Armenia	12	9	2	1	24	10	+14	29	Qualification for the Conference League first qualifying round
4	Alashkert	13	7	4	2	28	12	+16	25	
5	Sardarapat	13	5	5	3	20	20	0	20	
6	Urartu	12	4	4	4	19	15	+4	16	
7	Shirak	13	4	2	7	14	16	−2	14	
8	Van	13	3	2	8	12	32	−20	11	
9	Ararat Yerevan	13	3	2	8	10	21	−11	11	
10	BKMA	13	3	2	8	14	23	−9	11	
11	Syunik	12	2	2	8	11	26	−15	8	
12	Gandzasar Kapan	12	1	0	11	9	30	−21	3	Relegation to the Armenian First League

Updated to match(es) played on 7 November 2026. Source: FFA
Rules for classification: 1) Points; 2) Head-to-head points; 3) Head-to-head goal difference; 4) Head-to-head goals scored; 5) Matches won; 6) Goal difference; 7) Less red cards; 8) Less yellow cards ; 9) Fair-play ranking 10) Draw

=== Armenian Cup ===
27 October 2026 Round of 16	Pyunik	6–2	Ararat Yerevan	Yerevan
19:00 (UTC+4)	Griffith 5' (yellow card) 47'; Pikis 20', 32', 57'; Kenourgios (yellow card) 44'; Tarakhchyan 55'; Malakyan 70'	Report	Ukadike (yellow card) 40' (goal) 63'; Handzongo 81'	Stadium: Freedom Arena; Referee: Hovhannes Kalantaryan

== Squad statistics ==
As of match played 7 November 2026

=== Appearances and goals ===
No.	Pos	Nat	Player	Total		Premier League		Armenian Cup	
No.	Pos	Nat	Player	Apps	Goals	Apps	Goals	Apps	Goals
1	GK	(Comoros) COM	Adel Anzimati	12	0	12	0	0	0
3	DF	(Armenia) ARM	Albert Khachumyan	14	0	13	0	0+1	0
4	DF	(Armenia) ARM	Volodya Samsonyan	6	0	5	0	1	0
6	MF	(Nigeria) NGR	Okuchukwu Chukwu	12	1	8+3	1	0+1	0
7	FW	(Cameroon) CMR	Patrick Handzongo	14	3	11+2	2	0+1	1
8	MF	(Armenia) ARM	Petros Alekyan	14	1	10+3	1	1	0
9	MF	(Armenia) ARM	Benik Hovhannisyan	10	0	5+5	0	0	0
10	MF	(Armenia) ARM	Artur Grigoryan	13	0	10+2	0	0+1	0
11	MF	(Armenia) ARM	Narek Alaverdyan	12	0	3+8	0	1	0
13	GK	(Russia) RUS	Nikita Lobusov	2	0	1	0	1	0
17	MF	(Armenia) ARM	Edgar Movsesyan	13	1	10+2	1	0+1	0
18	DF	(Mali) MLI	Malick Berte	13	0	13	0	0	0
19	DF	(Mali) MLI	Souleymane Touré	2	0	0+1	0	1	0
20	FW	(Ivory Coast) CIV	Adama Meite	7	0	3+4	0	0	0
25	MF	(Ivory Coast) CIV	Aboubacar Ouattara	9	0	2+6	0	1	0
30	DF	(Armenia) ARM	Aram Aslanyan	10	1	10	1	0	0
32	DF	(Nigeria) NGR	Divine Ukadike	3	1	0+2	0	1	1
33	DF	(Armenia) ARM	Varazdat Haroyan	8	1	8	1	0	0
38	MF	(Ivory Coast) CIV	Moussa Kante	12	1	2+9	1	1	0
42	MF	(Ivory Coast) CIV	Mohamed Fofana	8	0	4+3	0	1	0
55	DF	(Senegal) SEN	Guy Lima	13	0	12	0	1	0
77	MF	(Armenia) ARM	Aleksandr Aleksanyan	4	0	0+4	0	0	0
94	FW	(Ivory Coast) CIV	Sindou Bakayoko	8	2	0+7	2	1	0
97	FW	(Armenia) ARM	Vardan Karapetyan	2	0	0+2	0	0	0
Players away on loan:
Players who left Ararat Yerevan during the season:
14	DF	(Armenia) ARM	Arman Khachatryan	3	0	1+2	0	0	0

=== Goal scorers ===
Place	Position	Nation	Number	Name	Premier League	Armenian Cup	Total
1	FW	(Cameroon)	7	Patrick Handzongo	2	1	3
2	FW	(Ivory Coast)	94	Sindou Bakayoko	2	0	2
3	DF	(Armenia)	33	Varazdat Haroyan	1	0	1
3	MF	(Armenia)	8	Petros Alekyan	1	0	1
3	MF	(Armenia)	17	Edgar Movsesyan	1	0	1
3	MF	(Ivory Coast)	38	Moussa Kante	1	0	1
3	DF	(Armenia)	30	Aram Aslanyan	1	0	1
3	MF	(Nigeria)	6	Okuchukwu Chukwu	1	0	1
3	DF	(Nigeria)	32	Divine Ukadike	0	1	1
				TOTALS	10	2	12

=== Clean sheets ===
Place	Position	Nation	Number	Name	Premier League	Armenian Cup	Total
1	GK	(Comoros)	1	Adel Anzimati	1	0	1
1	GK	(Russia)	13	Nikita Lobusov	1	0	1
				TOTALS	2	0	2

=== Disciplinary record ===
Number	Nation	Position	Name	Premier League		Armenian Cup		Total	
Number	Nation	Position	Name	Yellow card	Red card	Yellow card	Red card	Yellow card	Red card
1	(Comoros)	GK	Adel Anzimati	2	0	0	0	2	0
3	(Armenia)	DF	Albert Khachumyan	4	0	0	0	4	0
4	(Armenia)	DF	Volodya Samsonyan	3	0	0	0	3	0
6	(Nigeria)	MF	Okechukwu Chukwu	5	0	0	0	5	0
7	(Cameroon)	FW	Patrick Handzongo	2	0	0	0	2	0
9	(Armenia)	MF	Benik Hovhannisyan	1	0	0	0	1	0
11	(Armenia)	MF	Narek Alaverdyan	2	0	0	0	2	0
18	(Mali)	DF	Malick Berte	3	0	0	0	3	0
30	(Armenia)	DF	Aram Aslanyan	1	0	0	0	1	0
32	(Nigeria)	DF	Divine Ukadike	0	0	1	0	1	0
33	(Armenia)	DF	Varazdat Haroyan	5	1	0	0	5	1
38	(Ivory Coast)	MF	Moussa Kante	1	0	0	0	1	0
42	(Ivory Coast)	MF	Mohamed Fofana	1	0	0	0	1	0
55	(Senegal)	DF	Guy Lima	2	0	0	0	2	0
Players away on loan:
Players who left Ararat Yerevan during the season:
			TOTALS	32	1	1	0	33	1
