= Tiago Gomes =

Tiago Gomes may refer to:

- Tiago Gomes (footballer, born 1986), Portuguese football defender
- Tiago Gomes (footballer, born 1985), Portuguese football midfielder
- Tiago Gomes (footballer, born 2003), Brazilian football goalkeeeper

== See also ==
- Thiago Gomes (disambiguation)
