= Khalil Lambin =

French-Ivorian footballer

Khallil Lambin
Personal information
- Full name: Khallil Moustapha Lambin
- Date of birth: 3 August 1992 (age 34)
- Place of birth: Abidjan, Ivory Coast
- Height: 1.82 m (6 ft 0 in)
- Position: Forward

Youth career
- –2011: JMG Academy Chonburi
- 2013–2014: Sheffield Wednesday

Senior career*
Years	Team	Apps	(Gls)
2012	Ahed	7	(12)
2012–2013	Ergotelis	27	(18)
2014–2015	Hapoel Bnei Lod	11	(7)
2015	Maccabi Yavne	10	(7)
2015–2016	Patro Eisden	24	(14)
2016–2017	Shkupi	12	(15)
2017	Fribourg	31	(22)
2017–2018	Stade Nyonnais	24	(5)
2018	→ Bavois (loan)	14	(5)
- * Club domestic league appearances and goals

Khallil Moustapha Lambin (born 3 August 1992) is a footballer who plays as a forward. Born in the Ivory Coast, Lambin also holds French citizenship.

== Career ==
As a youth player, Lambin joined the JMG Academy in Thailand, before trialing for French Ligue 1 side Lorient and Umm Salal in Qatar. At the start of 2012, Lambin moved to Lebanese Premier League side Ahed for six months. He played seven games in the league, and scored a goal in six games in the 2012 AFC Cup. In summer 2012, Lambin signed for Football League Greece club Ergotelis. He played 27 league games, scoring four goals.

On 12 August 2013, Lambin joined the youth academy of Championship club Sheffield Wednesday on a one-year contract. He moved to Israel in 2014, playing first for Hapoel Bnei Lod and then for Maccabi Yavne in the 2014–15 Liga Leumit. He scored 13 goals in 21 games that season. Lambin signed for Belgian First Division B side Patro Eisden in 2015, where he scored six goals in 24 games, before joining Shkupi in the Macedonian First Football League the following year, playing 12 games and scoring 15 goals.

In January 2017 Lambin moved to Switzerland, first playing for 2. Liga Interregional club Fribourg, then moving to Stade Nyonnais in the Swiss Promotion League six months later. In January 2018, Lambin joined Bavois in a six-month loan.

== Honours ==
Hapoel Bnei Lod

- Toto Cup: 2014–15
