= Blankson Anoff =

Ghanaian footballer

Personal information
- Date of birth: 24 March 2001 (age 25)
- Place of birth: Ghana
- Height: 1.73 m (5 ft 8 in)
- Position: Midfielder

Team information
- Current team: Dila
- Number: 17

Youth career
- –2019: JMG Academy

Senior career*
Years	Team	Apps	(Gls)
2019–2021	Clermont	0	(0)
2020–2021	→ Lustenau (loan)	22	(3)
2021–2024	Swift	8	(1)
2025–	Dila	29	(2)
- * Club domestic league appearances and goals as of 10 December 2025

Blankson Anoff (born 24 March 2001) is a Ghanaian footballer who plays as a midfielder for Georgian top division club Dila.

== Career ==
As a youth player, Anoff joined the JMG Academy, which was originally in Ghana but later relocated to Ivory Coast. In 2019, he signed for Clermont in the French Ligue 1. In 2020, Anoff was sent on loan to Austrian second division club Lustenau, where he made 23 appearances and scored 3 goals. On 11 September 2020, he debuted for Lustenau during a 1–1 draw with SV Horn. On 3 October 2020, Anoff scored his first goal for Lustenau during a 4–0 win over Vorwärts Steyr. In 2021, he signed for Swift in Luxembourg.

In February 2025, Anoff joined Georgian club Dila on a year-long deal.
