= Thiago Gomes =

Thiago Gomes may refer to:

- Thiago Gomes (rower) (born 1979), Brazilian rower
- Thiago Gomes (footballer) (born 1982), Brazilian footballer
- Thiago Gomes (football manager) (born 1984), Brazilian football manager

== See also ==
- Tiago Gomes (disambiguation)
