= Sandro Trémoulet =

Malagasy footballer (born 1999)

Personal information
- Full name: Sandro Dennis Trémoulet
- Date of birth: 18 November 1999 (age 26)
- Place of birth: Sète, France
- Height: 1.90 m (6 ft 3 in)
- Position: Defender

Team information
- Current team: Karlsruher SC
- Number: 24

Senior career*
Years	Team	Apps	(Gls)
–2019	Castelnau Le Crès		
2019–2020	FU Narbonne		
2020	Vannes		
2021	FU Narbonne		
2021–2022	Sète	26	(0)
2022–2024	Seraing	26	(0)
2024–2025	Ararat Yerevan	7	(0)
2025–2026	Radnik Surdulica	31	(1)
2026–	Karlsruher SC	0	(0)

International career^{‡}
2024–	Madagascar	9	(0)
- * Club domestic league appearances and goals as of 12 June 2026 ‡ National team caps and goals as of 18:02, 6 January 2026 (UTC)

Sandro Dennis Trémoulet (born 19 November 1999) is a professional footballer who plays as a defender for 2. Bundesliga club Karlsruher SC. Born in France, he plays for the Madagascar national team.

== Early life ==
Trémoulet was born on 19 November 1999 in Sète, France. Of Guadeloupean and Malagasy descent through his parents, he has an older brother.

== Club career ==
Trémoulet started his career with French side Castelnau Le Crès. In 2019, he signed for French side FU Narbonne before signing for French side Vannes in 2020. Six months later, he returned to French side FU Narbonne. Following his stint there, he signed for French side Sète in 2021, where he made twenty-six league appearances and scored zero goals. Belgian newspaper La Dernière Heure wrote in 2022 that he "[earned] a starting spot at Sète in the Championnat National" while playing for the club.

Ahead of the 2022–23 season, he signed for Belgian side Seraing, where he made twenty-six league appearances and scored zero goals and suffered relegation from the top flight to the second tier. Subsequently, he signed for Armenian side Ararat Yerevan in 2024, where he made seven league appearances and scored zero goals.

After half a season without a club, he joined Serbian club Radnik Surdulica in July 2025. On 11 August 2026, he signed for 2. Bundesliga club Karlsruher SC.

== International career ==
Trémoulet is a Madagascar international. During October and November 2024, he played for the Madagascar football team for 2025 Africa Cup of Nations qualification.
