= Yaya Sogodogo =

Ivorian footballer (born 2002)

Personal information
- Full name: Yaya Sogodogo
- Date of birth: 20 November 2002 (age 23)
- Place of birth: Abidjan, Ivory Coast
- Height: 1.80 m (5 ft 11 in)
- Position: Forward

Team information
- Current team: Persijap Jepara
- Number: 17

Senior career*
Years	Team	Apps	(Gls)
2022–2023	SO de l'Armée		
2023–2024	Bouaké		
2025–2026	Ararat Yerevan	15	(2)
2026–	Persijap Jepara	9	(0)

International career
–2025	Ivory Coast U23	4	(0)
- * Club domestic league appearances and goals as of 7 November 2026

Yaya Sogodogo (born 20 November 2002) is an Ivorian professional footballer who plays as a forward for Super League club Persijap Jepara.

== Club career ==
=== Early career ===
Sogodogo began his senior career in his home country, representing domestic clubs SO de l'Armée and Bouaké in the Ivorian Ligue 1.

=== Ararat Yerevan ===
In 2025, he moved abroad to join Armenian Premier League club Ararat Yerevan. On 1 August 2025, he made his debut as a starter for Ararat Yerevan in the Armenian Premier League match against Gandzasar in a 1–1 draw. On 4 October 2025, he scored his first league goal for the club against BKMA, scored the equalizing in a 2–2 draw. He added his second league goals of the season on 21 November 2025 with one goal against Ararat-Armenia in a 1–2 home lose. He contributed with 15 league appearances and scored 2 goals before his departure in mid-2026.

=== Persijap Jepara ===
In August 2026, Sogodogo move to Indonesia to sign a professional contract with Persijap Jepara to compete in Super League. He made his league debut for Persijap Jepara on 6 September 2026, coming on as a starter in a 2–0 lose over Madura United.
