= Tiago Gomes (footballer, born 2003) =

Brazilian footballer (born 2003)

Personal information
- Full name: Tiago Gomes dos Santos
- Date of birth: 20 January 2003 (age 23)
- Place of birth: Salvador, Brazil
- Height: 1.94 m (6 ft 4 in)
- Position: Goalkeeper

Team information
- Current team: Portuguesa
- Number: 82

Youth career
- Vitória
- 2017–2022: Athletico Paranaense
- 2022–2023: Bahia

Senior career*
Years	Team	Apps	(Gls)
2024–2025	Ararat Yerevan	32	(0)
2025–2026	Drenica	13	(0)
2026	Malisheva	0	(0)
2026	Żabbar St. Patrick	0	(0)
2027–	Portuguesa	0	(0)
- * Club domestic league appearances and goals as of 22:52, 20 October 2026 (UTC)

Tiago Gomes dos Santos (born 20 January 2003), known as Tiago Gomes or just Tiago, is a Brazilian professional footballer who plays as a goalkeeper for Portuguesa.

== Club career ==
Born in Salvador, Bahia, Tiago began his career with Vitória, and played for Athletico Paranaense before joining the under-20 squad of Bahia in 2022. A fourth-choice in the first team during the 2023 season, he was released on 29 December of that year, as his contract was due to expire.

On 23 January 2024, Tiago moved abroad and joined Armenian Premier League side Ararat Yerevan. He made his senior debut on 24 February, starting in a 1–0 home win over West Armenia, and established himself as a regular starter afterwards.

Tiago lost his starting spot in April 2025, and moved to Drenica of the Football Superleague of Kosovo in August. Despite being regularly used, he joined fellow league team Malisheva on 27 February 2026, but acted as a backup option to Ilir Avdyli during his spell.

On 29 July 2026, Tiago was announced at Maltese Premier League side Żabbar St. Patrick, but left the club in September after making n appearances. On 19 October, he agreed to a deal with Portuguesa back in his home country for the upcoming season.

== International career ==
On 27 April 2019, Tiago was called up to the Brazil national under-17 team for a period of trainings.

== Career statistics ==
As of 20 October 2026

Club	Season	League			State League		Cup		Continental		Other		Total	
Club	Season	Division	Apps	Goals	Apps	Goals	Apps	Goals	Apps	Goals	Apps	Goals	Apps	Goals
Ararat Yerevan	2023–24	Armenian Premier League	16	0	—		0	0	—		—		16	0
Ararat Yerevan	2024–25	Armenian Premier League	16	0	—		1	0	—		—		17	0
Ararat Yerevan	Total		32	0	—		1	0	—		—		33	0
Drenica	2025–26	Football Superleague of Kosovo	13	0	—		0	0	—		—		13	0
Malisheva	2025–26	Football Superleague of Kosovo	0	0	—		0	0	—		—		0	0
Żabbar St. Patrick	2026–27	Maltese Premier League	0	0	—		0	0	—		—		0	0
Portuguesa	2027	Série D	0	0	0	0	0	0	—		—		0	0
Career total			45	0	0	0	1	0	0	0	0	0	46	0
