= Adel Anzimati =

Footballer (born 2001)

Adel Anzimati-Aboudou
Personal information
- Date of birth: 5 November 2001 (age 24)
- Place of birth: Saint-Pierre, Réunion, France
- Height: 1.94 m (6 ft 4 in)
- Position: Goalkeeper

Team information
- Current team: Ararat Yerevan
- Number: 1

Youth career
- 2015–2017: ES Buxerolles
- 2017-2019: Stade Poitevin
- 2019–2020: Quevilly-Rouen

Senior career*
Years	Team	Apps	(Gls)
2020–2024	Quevilly-Rouen	17	(0)
2024–2025	Martigues	0	(0)
2025–	Ararat Yerevan	24	(0)

International career^{‡}
2023–	Comoros	7	(0)
- * Club domestic league appearances and goals as of 18 June 2026 ‡ National team caps and goals as of 18:26, 3 September 2025 (UTC)

Adel Anzimati-Aboudou (born 5 November 2001) is a professional footballer who plays as a goalkeeper for the Armenian Premier League club Ararat Yerevan. Born in Réunion, he plays for the Comoros national team.

== Club career ==
A youth product of ES Buxerolles, Stade Poitevin and Quevilly-Rouen, Anzimati began his senior career with Quevilly-Rouen's reserves and was named to their senior squad for the 2023–2024 season. In the summer of 2024, he joined Martigues in the Ligue 2. On 18 August 2025, he joined the Armenian Premier League.

== International career ==
Born in France, Anzimati is of Comorian descent and holds dual French-Comorian citizenship. He was called up to the Comoros national team for the 2024 COSAFA Cup.

On 11 December 2025, Anzimati was called up to the Comoros squad for the 2025 Africa Cup of Nations.
