= Kassim Hadji =

Comorian footballer (born 2000)

Personal information
- Date of birth: 23 March 2000 (age 26)
- Place of birth: Ntsoudjini, Comoros
- Height: 1.82 m (6 ft 0 in)
- Position: Winger

Team information
- Current team: Botev Vratsa
- Number: 81

Youth career
- 2011–2014: Twamaya
- 2014–2017: Volcan Club
- 2017–2020: Olympique Rillieux

Senior career*
Years	Team	Apps	(Gls)
2020–2021	Ain Sud	5	(1)
2021–2023	Stade Nyonnais	45	(7)
2023–2025	Ararat Yerevan	64	(10)
2025	FK Žalgiris	23	(1)
2026–	Botev Vratsa	11	(1)

International career^{‡}
2023–	Comoros	8	(1)
- * Club domestic league appearances and goals as of 11 June 2026 ‡ National team caps and goals as of 7 July 2024

Kassim Hadji (born 23 March 2000) is a Comorian professional footballer who plays as a winger for Bulgarian First League club Botev Vratsa and the Comoros national team.

== Club career ==
Hadji is a youth product of the Comorian clubs Twamaya and Volcan Club, before moving to France with Olympique Rillieux. He began his senior career with Ain Sud on 4 May 2020. He followed that up with a move to Switzerland with Stade Nyonnais the following season. On 17 February 2023, he moved to the Armenian Premier League with Ararat Yerevan. On 26 July 2024, Ararat announced that Hadji had extended his contract with the club for another season. On 29 January 2025, the Ararat club officially announced his contract was void.

=== Žalgiris ===
On 4 February 2025, Hadji signed with Lithuanian club Žalgiris. On 4 December 2025 announced, that Hadji left Žalgiris Club.

=== Botev Vratsa ===
In January 2026 he joined Bulgarian team Botev Vratsa.

== International career ==
Hadji debuted with the senior Comoros national team in a 2–1 friendly win over Cape Verde on 17 October 2023.
