= Marc Tsoungui =

Swiss footballer (born 2002)

Personal information
- Full name: Marc Fred Tsoungui
- Date of birth: 30 July 2002 (age 24)
- Place of birth: Yaoundé, Cameroon
- Height: 1.80 m (5 ft 11 in)
- Position: Left-back

Team information
- Current team: Étoile Carouge
- Number: 99

Youth career
- 2013–2014: La Sallaz
- 2014–2019: Lausanne-Sport
- 2019–2020: Napoli

Senior career*
| Years | Team | Apps | (Gls) |
| 2020–2022 | Lausanne-Sport | 15 | (1) |
| 2022 | → Lausanne-Ouchy (loan) | 3 | (0) |
| 2022–2025 | Lausanne-Ouchy | 14 | (0) |
| 2025 | Ararat Yerevan | 9 | (0) |
| 2026 | Unirea Slobozia | 3 | (0) |
| 2026– | Étoile Carouge | 3 | (0) |

International career
| 2017–2018 | Switzerland U16 | 4 | (0) |
| 2018 | Switzerland U17 | 1 | (0) |
| 2023 | Switzerland U20 | 2 | (0) |
- * Club domestic league appearances and goals as of 18 September 2026

Marc Fred Tsoungui (born 30 July 2002) is a professional footballer who plays as a left-back for Swiss Challenge League club Étoile Carouge. Born in Cameroon, he represented Switzerland internationally.

== Career ==
In 2020, Tsoungui signed for FC Lausanne-Sport on 1 August 2020. He made his professional debut with FC Lausanne-Sport in a 4–0 Swiss Super League win over FC Zürich on 3 October 2020.

On 14 February 2022, Tsoungui moved to Lausanne-Ouchy on loan. On 27 June 2022, he moved to Lausanne-Ouchy on a permanent basis.

On 22 February 2025, Tsoungui moved the Armenian Premier League, to play for FC Ararat Yerevan.
