= Gor Malakyan =

Armenian footballer

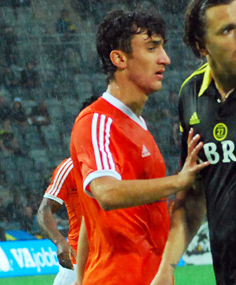

Personal information
- Full name: Gor Shavarshevich Malakyan
- Date of birth: 12 June 1994 (age 32)
- Place of birth: Yerevan, Armenia
- Height: 1.73 m (5 ft 8 in)
- Position: Midfielder

Senior career*
| Years | Team | Apps | (Gls) |
| 2011–2014 | Pyunik Yerevan | 57 | (5) |
| 2014 | Alashkert | 11 | (0) |
| 2015 | Shirak Gyumri | 25 | (4) |
| 2016–2018 | Stal Kamianske | 43 | (0) |
| 2018–2020 | Ararat-Armenia | 40 | (0) |
| 2020–2021 | Pyunik | 10 | (0) |
| 2021–2025 | Ararat | 112 | (1) |

International career^{‡}
| 2010 | Armenia U17 | 3 | (0) |
| 2011–2012 | Armenia U19 | 9 | (0) |
| 2013–2016 | Armenia U21 | 12 | (3) |
| 2016–2019 | Armenia | 18 | (0) |

Managerial career
- 2025–: Pyunik (assistant)
- * Club domestic league appearances and goals as of 9 August 2025 ‡ National team caps and goals as of 15 October 2019 (UTC)

Gor Malakyan (Armenian: Գոռ Մալաքյան; born 12 June 1994) is an Armenian former professional footballer who played as a midfielder.

== Biography ==
Gor Malakyan was born on 12 June 1994 in Yerevan, Armenia. He is the younger brother of current teammate Edgar Malakyan, with whom he has also shared squad in FC Pyunik (2011/12), Alashkert FC (2014), FC Shirak (2015) and the Armenia national football team (2016–2019). Despite Gor had originally started playing in more attacking positions, such as playmaker or secondary striker, his conditions and characteristics lead him to deeper and more defensive and balanced positions. By the time he got to FC Shirak, he had been playing central midfield - thus getting to a steady role as a defensive midfielder. After a great performance in 2015/16 UEFA Europa League playoffs, nearly qualifying for the group stage, FC Stal Kamianske (owned by another Armenian) decided to purchase his and his older brother's services. Since then, he has cemented himself as a regular member of the team's rotation system. In July 2018 he left the organized Stal Kamianske (Feniks Bucha) and returned to Armenia to join the newly created Ararat-Armenia. On 30 July 2020, Ararat-Armenia announced the departure of Malakyan after his contract expired.

On 3 August 2020, Malakyan moved to Pyunik. On 1 June 2021, he left the club upon expiration of his contract.

On 29 June 2021, Malakyan signed a contract with Ararat Yerevan.

On 12 August 2025, being the captain of Ararat Yerevan, Malakyan decided to end his playing career and join the new coaching staff of Pyunik.

== Personal life ==
Gor is the younger brother of Edgar Malakyan.

== Career statistics ==
=== International ===
As of 15 October 2019

Armenia
| Year | Apps | Goals |
|---|---|---|
| 2016 | 7 | 0 |
| 2017 | 3 | 0 |
| 2018 | 6 | 0 |
| 2019 | 2 | 0 |
| Total | 18 | 0 |

== Honours ==
=== Club ===
Pyunik

- Armenian Cup (2): 2012–13, 2013–14
- Armenian Supercup (1): 2011

Ararat-Armenia

- Armenian Premier League (2): 2018–19, 2019–20
- Armenian Supercup (1): 2019
