= Bertrand Mani =

Chad-Cameroonian footballer

Personal information
- Full name: Bertrand Junior Mani
- Date of birth: 25 May 1997 (age 29)
- Place of birth: Yaoundé, Cameroon
- Height: 1.78 m (5 ft 10 in)
- Position: Forward

Team information
- Current team: Gandzasar Kapan
- Number: 7

Senior career*
Years	Team	Apps	(Gls)
2017–2020	AS Fortuna		
2021–2022	Colombe Sportive		
2022–2023	Cape Town City	16	(2)
2023–2024	Ararat Yerevan	29	(2)
2024–	Gandzasar Kapan	51	(6)

International career^{‡}
2021–2022	Cameroon	4	(0)
2025–	Chad	2	(0)
- * Club domestic league appearances and goals as of 18 June 2026 ‡ National team caps and goals as of 17 November 2025

Bertrand Mani (born 25 May 1997) is a footballer who plays as a forward for Gandzasar Kapan. Born in Cameroon, he originally played for Cameroon at international level, before switching to Chad in 2025.

== Career ==
Playing for AS Fortuna and Colombe Sportive in the Cameroonian Elite One, Mani was selected for the 2020 African Nations Championship (postponed to 2021) and played three matches. In the 2022 Elite One, Mani reportedly became top goalscorer with 20 goals. Camfoot noted that Enow Nkembe scored as many goals, and thus it was "surprising" that Mani received the accolade at the Cameroon Football Federation Awards. Most notably, Mani scored 5 goals in an 8–2 victory over Fauve Azur.

Mani was discovered by South African club Cape Town City, who was on the lookout for a "number nine" to replace Kermit Erasmus. He was announced as a new signing in November 2022 and would join after the World Cup in December. Then, Mani scored on his South African Premier Division debut against Royal AM. In January 2023 he received a man-of-the-match award against Chippa United. However, his debut goal would remain his only goal for Cape Town City, and the club decided they would no longer prioritize to have Mani on the foreign player quota. An option to prolong his contract was not exercised.

In September 2023 it was announced that Mani joined Ararat Yerevan of the Armenian Premier League. On 31 May 2024, Ararat announced that Mani was one of six players to leave the club.
