= Albert Khachumyan =

Armenian footballer

Personal information
- Date of birth: 23 June 1999 (age 27)
- Place of birth: Yerevan, Armenia
- Height: 1.85 m (6 ft 1 in)
- Position: Centre-back

Team information
- Current team: FC Ararat Yerevan
- Number: 3

Youth career
- Pyunik

Senior career*
Years	Team	Apps	(Gls)
2016–2017	Pyunik	0	(0)
2019–2024	Ararat-Armenia	49	(4)
2018–2020	→ Ararat-Armenia II	27	(1)
2022–2023	→ BKMA Yerevan (loan)	57	(1)
2024–	FC Ararat Yerevan	63	(1)

International career^{‡}
2014	Armenia U-16	3	(0)
2014	Armenia U-17	4	(0)
2017	Armenia U-19	17	(0)
2018–2020	Armenia U-21	10	(0)
2021–	Armenia	1	(0)
- * Club domestic league appearances and goals as of 18 June 2026 ‡ National team caps and goals as of 5 June 2021

Albert Khachumyan (Armenian: Ալբերտ Խաչումյան; born 23 June 1999) is an Armenian football player, who plays for FC Ararat Yerevan, and the Armenia national team.

== International career ==
He made his debut for Armenia national football team on 5 June 2021 in a friendly against Sweden. He substituted André Calisir in the 74th minute.

== Honours ==
=== Club ===
Ararat-Armenia

- Armenian Premier League (2): 2018–19, 2019–20
- Armenian Supercup (1): 2019
