= JMG Academy =

Sports training company

- Founded: 2002
- Founder: Jean-Marc Guillou

The JMG Academy is an African and Asian sports organization and training company established by French international football player Jean-Marc Guillou.

== Overview ==
Guillou had established Académie de Sol Beni in Abidjan in 1994 via a partnership with ASEC Mimosas. JMG Academy was established in 2002 following a disagreement between Guillou and ASEC over control of the academy.

The success of the academy in Abidjan saw JMG expand into other parts of the world.

== Locations ==
The company has nine academies throughout the world: Ivory Coast from 1994; Madagascar from 2000; Thailand from 2005; Mali from 2006; Algeria (in partnership with Paradou AC), Egypt, and Vietnam from 2007; Ghana from 2008.

The projects in Egypt, Thailand and Vietnam have all been assisted by Arsenal.

== Notable players ==
- (Ghana) Salis Abdul Samed
- (Ghana) Blankson Anoff
- (Algeria) Youcef Atal
- (Algeria) Ramy Bensebaini
- (Mali) Yves Bissouma
- (Belgium) Jason Denayer
- (Mali) Souleymane Diarra
- (Mali) Cheick Doucouré
- (Mali) Mahamadou Doumbia
- (Mali) Kodjo Doussé
- (Mali) Dieudonné Gbakle
- (Mali) Habib Keïta
- (Mali) Rominigue Kouamé
- (Ivory Coast) Khalil Lambin
- (Mali) Amadou Haidara
- (Mali) Dorgeles Nene
- (Ivory Coast) Christ Inao Oulaï
- (Mali) Adama Traoré
- (Mali) Kévin Zohi
