= List of Armenian football transfers summer 2023 =

This is a list of Armenian football transfers in the summer transfer window, by club. Only clubs of the 2023–24 Armenian Premier League are included.

== Armenian Premier League 2023-24 ==
=== Alashkert ===
In: Note: Flags indicate national team as defined under FIFA eligibility rules; some limited exceptions apply. Players may hold more than one non-FIFA nationality.

No.	Pos.	Nation	Player
9	FW	GEO	Levan Kutalia (from (Israel) Sektzia Ness Ziona)
10	MF	RUS	David Khurtsidze (from (Armenia) Urartu)
20	MF	ARM	Yuri Gareginyan (from (Armenia) Pyunik)
21	FW	VEN	Robinson Flores (from (Venezuela) Metropolitanos)
55	DF	BRA	Tiago Cametá
70	DF	BRA	William (from (Ukraine) Inhulets Petrove)
71	GK	ARM	Anatoly Ayvazov
94	MF	NGA	Sodiq Fatai (from (Portugal) Sporting da Covilhã)
98	DF	GNB	Mimito Biai (from (Romania) Argeș Pitești)

Out: Note: Flags indicate national team as defined under FIFA eligibility rules; some limited exceptions apply. Players may hold more than one non-FIFA nationality.

No.	Pos.	Nation	Player
1	GK	ARM	Sevak Aslanyan
10	FW	ARM	Artur Miranyan (to (Armenia) Noah)
15	DF	ARM	Arman Khachatryan (to West Armenia)
20	FW	BRA	Thiago Galvão
21	MF	ARM	Artak Grigoryan (to (Armenia) Pyunik)
70	DF	KAZ	Timur Rudoselsky (to (Kazakhstan) Aktobe)
71	GK	UKR	Roman Mysak (to (Ukraine) Dnipro-1)
94	FW	SRB	Uroš Nenadović (to (Serbia) Napredak Kruševac)
98	MF	CRO	Ivan Pešić (to (Croatia) NK Rudeš)
—	MF	ARM	Narek Manukyan (on loan to (Armenia) BKMA Yerevan)

=== Ararat-Armenia ===
In: Note: Flags indicate national team as defined under FIFA eligibility rules; some limited exceptions apply. Players may hold more than one non-FIFA nationality.

No.	Pos.	Nation	Player
7	FW	POR	Adriano Castanheira (from (Portugal) Paços de Ferreira)
13	MF	RUS	Nikolai Kipiani (from (Georgia (country)) Dinamo Batumi)
14	DF	BRA	Léo Silva (from (Brazil) Sampaio Corrêa)
24	GK	ARM	Arsen Beglaryan (from (Armenia) Urartu)
27	FW	GUI	Mohamed Yattara (from (France) Pau)
41	DF	BRA	Cássio Scheid (from (Thailand) BG Pathum United)

Out: Note: Flags indicate national team as defined under FIFA eligibility rules; some limited exceptions apply. Players may hold more than one non-FIFA nationality.

No.	Pos.	Nation	Player
7	FW	POR	Hugo Firmino (to (Portugal) Penafiel)
8	MF	ARM	Gevorg Ghazaryan (Retired)
9	MF	ARM	Artur Serobyan (to (Portugal) Casa Pia)
14	MF	CPV	Mailson Lima (to (Kazakhstan) Aksu)
21	MF	ARM	Solomon Udo (to (Kazakhstan) Caspiy)
25	DF	CRO	Dragan Lovrić (to (Romania) Oțelul Galați)
27	FW	NGA	Taofiq Jibril (to (Armenia) Pyunik)
29	FW	NGA	Jesse Akila (to (Slovakia) AS Trenčín)
33	GK	RUS	Dmitry Abakumov (to (Armenia) Urartu)
88	FW	CIV	Wilfried Eza (to (Austria) SV Ried)
—	DF	ARM	Styopa Mkrtchyan (on loan to (Croatia) NK Osijek)
—	MF	ARM	Davit Petrosyan (on loan to (Armenia) Van)
—	MF	ARM	Vahram Makhsudyan (on loan to West Armenia)

=== Ararat Yerevan ===
In: Note: Flags indicate national team as defined under FIFA eligibility rules; some limited exceptions apply. Players may hold more than one non-FIFA nationality.

No.	Pos.	Nation	Player
3	DF	ARM	Arsen Galstyan (from (Armenia) Noah)
4	DF	ARM	Volodya Samsonyan (from (Armenia) BKMA Yerevan)
8	MF	FRA	Clément Lhernault (from (France) AS Nancy)
11	FW	ARM	Armen Nahapetyan (from Ararat-Armenia)
12	DF	GHA	Clinton Dombila (from (Mali) JMG Football Academy)
13	GK	ARM	Arman Harutyunyan (from (Armenia) Lernayin Artsakh)
14	MF	TUN	Rayane Mzoughi (from (Tunisia) AS Gabès)
15	FW	MLI	Kalifala Doombia (from (Mali) Gidars)
18	DF	MLI	Malick Aziz Berte (from (Mali) Gidars)
22	GK	ARM	Narek Hovhannisyan (from (Armenia) Gandzasar Kapan)

Out: Note: Flags indicate national team as defined under FIFA eligibility rules; some limited exceptions apply. Players may hold more than one non-FIFA nationality.

No.	Pos.	Nation	Player
1	GK	ARM	Gor Manukyan (to West Armenia)
4	DF	FRA	Teddy Mézague
5	DF	ARM	Hrayr Mkoyan (to (Armenia) Shirak)
6	DF	ARM	Hayk Ishkhanyan (to (Armenia) BKMA Yerevan)
8	DF	ARM	Vardan Arzoyan
10	FW	BIH	Aleksandar Glišić (to (Armenia) Noah)
14	MF	ARM	Petros Afajanyan (to (Armenia) Syunik)
22	DF	SRB	Dušan Mijić (to (Uzbekistan) Dinamo Samarqand)
25	MF	CIV	Armand Dagrou (to (Ivory Coast) ASEC Mimosas)
33	DF	ARM	Hovhannes Nazaryan (to (Armenia) Van)
45	FW	CIV	Amara Traoré
70	MF	CIV	Sosthène Tiehide
71	GK	RUS	Sergei Revyakin (to (Kazakhstan) Zhetysu)
96	DF	ARM	Arman Hovhannisyan (to (Armenia) Pyunik)

=== BKMA Yerevan ===
In: Note: Flags indicate national team as defined under FIFA eligibility rules; some limited exceptions apply. Players may hold more than one non-FIFA nationality.

No.	Pos.	Nation	Player
8	MF	ARM	Ruben Yesayan (on loan from (Armenia) Urartu)
19	MF	ARM	Narek Manukyan (on loan from (Armenia) Alashkert)
23	DF	ARM	Khariton Azvazyan (on loan from (Armenia) Urartu)
24	MF	ARM	Karlen Hovhannisyan (on loan from (Armenia) Pyunik)
54	MF	ARM	Seroj Titizian (from (Luxembourg) UN Käerjéng 97)
55	DF	ARM	Hayk Ishkhanyan (from (Armenia) Ararat Yerevan)
—	DF	ARM	Mark Avetisyan (on loan from (Armenia) Pyunik)
—	FW	ARM	Aris Karapetyan (on loan from (Armenia) Pyunik)

Out: Note: Flags indicate national team as defined under FIFA eligibility rules; some limited exceptions apply. Players may hold more than one non-FIFA nationality.

No.	Pos.	Nation	Player
5	DF	ARM	Volodya Samsonian (to (Armenia) Ararat Yerevan)
8	MF	ARM	Mikayel Mirzoyan (to (Armenia) Urartu)
22	FW	ARM	Gevorg Tarakhchyan (to (Armenia) Urartu)
—	MF	ARM	Yuri Martirosyan (to West Armenia)

=== Noah ===
In: Note: Flags indicate national team as defined under FIFA eligibility rules; some limited exceptions apply. Players may hold more than one non-FIFA nationality.

No.	Pos.	Nation	Player
4	DF	POR	Pedro Farrim (from (Portugal) Real)
5	DF	NED	Jordy Tutuarima (from (Netherlands) PEC Zwolle)
6	MF	POR	Martim Maia (from (Portugal) Santa Clara)
7	FW	ARM	Edgar Movsesyan (from (Armenia) Van)
8	MF	ARM	Rumyan Hovsepyan (from (Armenia) Van)
9	FW	ARM	Artur Miranyan (from (Armenia) Alashkert)
10	MF	URU	Nico Varela (from (Cyprus) AEZ Zakakiou)
11	FW	BRA	Allef (from (Russia) Volga Ulyanovsk)
13	MF	ARM	Robert Baghramyan (from (Armenia) Urartu)
14	FW	NED	Paul Gladon (from (Netherlands) Fortuna Sittard)
19	DF	ARM	Vaspurak Minasyan (from (Armenia) Van)
20	MF	SVK	Martin Gamboš (from (Sweden) Västerås)
22	GK	CGO	Christoffer Mafoumbi (from (Luxembourg) Differdange 03)
25	FW	COD	Dieumerci Mbokani (from (Belgium) Beveren)
26	DF	SRB	Aleksandar Miljković (from (Armenia) Pyunik)
27	FW	ARM	Gor Manvelyan (from (France) Nantes)
30	DF	ISR	Ahmad Switat (from (Israel) Hapoel Ironi Kiryat Shmona)
31	DF	ARM	Hovhannes Hambardzumyan (from (Cyprus) Anorthosis Famagusta)
55	DF	MOZ	David Malembana (from (Bulgaria) Lokomotiv 1929 Sofia)
77	GK	ITA	Valerio Vimercati
78	FW	BIH	Aleksandar Glišić (from (Armenia) Ararat Yerevan)
88	MF	NED	Justin Mathieu (from (Netherlands) TOP Oss)
97	MF	NED	Ilias Alhaft (from (Netherlands) Almere City)

Out: Note: Flags indicate national team as defined under FIFA eligibility rules; some limited exceptions apply. Players may hold more than one non-FIFA nationality.

No.	Pos.	Nation	Player
1	GK	ROU	Raul Balbarau (loan return to (Hungary) Debreceni)
2	DF	ARM	Arsen Galstyan (to (Armenia) Ararat Yerevan)
6	MF	BLR	Hayk Musakhanyan (to (Finland) Haka)
9	FW	ARM	Levon Vardanyan (loan return to (Armenia) Pyunik)
10	FW	NGA	Peter Olawale (loan return to (Hungary) Debreceni)
11	MF	GHA	Israel Opoku (to (Armenia) Nikarm)
17	MF	NGA	Adams Friday (to (Romania) Botoșani)
18	DF	NGA	Prince Ebenezer (to (Bulgaria) Arda Kardzhali)
22	MF	ARM	Ruben Yesayan (loan return to (Armenia) Urartu)
23	MF	ARM	Hayk Ghevondyan (loan return to (Armenia) Urartu)
26	MF	RUS	Arsen Ayrapetyan (loan return to (Russia) Rodina Moscow)
77	GK	ARM	Arman Simonyan (to (Armenia) Gandzasar Kapan)
91	FW	NGA	Goodnews Igbokwe (on loan to (Israel) Hapoel Ramat Gan Givatayim)

=== Pyunik ===
In: Note: Flags indicate national team as defined under FIFA eligibility rules; some limited exceptions apply. Players may hold more than one non-FIFA nationality.

No.	Pos.	Nation	Player
3	DF	ARM	Arman Hovhannisyan (from (Armenia) Ararat Yerevan)
10	MF	ARM	Artak Grigoryan (from (Armenia) Alashkert)
12	MF	BRA	Ravanelli
17	MF	BRA	Gustavo Marmentini
19	FW	ARM	Levon Vardanyan (loan return from (Armenia) Noah)
23	MF	BRA	Vagner Gonçalves (on loan from (Georgia (country)) Dinamo Tbilisi)
24	FW	NGA	Taofiq Jibril (from Ararat-Armenia)
28	FW	NED	Sam Hendriks
77	MF	BRA	Régis
97	MF	ARM	David Davidyan (from (Russia) Khimki, previously on loan)

Out: Note: Flags indicate national team as defined under FIFA eligibility rules; some limited exceptions apply. Players may hold more than one non-FIFA nationality.

No.	Pos.	Nation	Player
2	FW	BIH	Luka Juričić (to (Romania) CFR Cluj)
4	DF	MKD	Kire Ristevski (to (Cyprus) Ethnikos Achna)
10	MF	MKD	Stefan Spirovski (to (Cyprus) Ethnikos Achna)
12	FW	HAI	Jonel Désiré (to (Georgia (country)) Telavi)
17	MF	UKR	Roman Karasyuk (to (Slovakia) Zemplín Michalovce)
29	MF	MDA	Eugeniu Cociuc
37	FW	ARM	Vrezh Chiloyan (on loan to (Armenia) Van)
44	DF	UKR	Alan Aussi (loan return to (Ukraine) Dynamo Kyiv)
85	MF	ARM	Karlen Hovhannisyan (on loan to (Armenia) BKMA Yerevan)
88	MF	ARM	Yuri Gareginyan (to (Armenia) Alashkert)
89	FW	ARM	Aris Karapetyan (on loan to (Armenia) BKMA Yerevan)
90	DF	SRB	Aleksandar Miljković (to (Armenia) Noah)
—	GK	ARM	Aram Ter-Minasyan (to (Armenia) Van)
—	DF	ARM	Mark Avetisyan (on loan to (Armenia) BKMA Yerevan)

=== Shirak ===
In: Note: Flags indicate national team as defined under FIFA eligibility rules; some limited exceptions apply. Players may hold more than one non-FIFA nationality.

No.	Pos.	Nation	Player
1	GK	SRB	Darko Vukašinović (from (Serbia) Loznica)
5	DF	ARM	Hrayr Mkoyan (from (Armenia) Ararat Yerevan)
24	MF	RUS	Artem Kiba (from West Armenia)
97	FW	CIV	Cedric Doh

Out: Note: Flags indicate national team as defined under FIFA eligibility rules; some limited exceptions apply. Players may hold more than one non-FIFA nationality.

No.	Pos.	Nation	Player
2	DF	ARM	Robert Hakobyan
4	DF	ARM	Artyom Mikaelyan
8	MF	ARM	Erik Vardanyan (to (Armenia) Syunik)
14	MF	CIV	Allasane Doumbia
17	MF	ARM	Mher Tarloyan (to (Armenia) BKMA Yerevan)
20	FW	ARM	Vrezh Torosyan
23	FW	CIV	Vally Cisse
29	DF	SRB	Marko Prljević (to (Serbia) Radnički Sremska Mitrovica)
77	MF	CIV	Moussa Bakayoko (to (Kazakhstan) Zhetysu)

=== Urartu ===
In: Note: Flags indicate national team as defined under FIFA eligibility rules; some limited exceptions apply. Players may hold more than one non-FIFA nationality.

No.	Pos.	Nation	Player
17	MF	BRA	Eduardo Teixeira (from (Portugal) Braga)
19	FW	RUS	Nikolai Prudnikov (from (Hungary) Mezőkövesd)
20	DF	MNE	Periša Pešukić (from (Serbia) Novi Pazar)
22	MF	ARM	Mikayel Mirzoyan (from (Armenia) BKMA Yerevan)
24	DF	SRB	Uroš Stojanović (from (Serbia) Radnik Surdulica)
28	MF	RUS	Pavel Mogilevets
31	GK	RUS	Dmitry Abakumov (from Ararat-Armenia)
55	FW	RUS	Artyom Maksimenko (from (Russia) Ural Yekaterinburg)
—	FW	ARM	Gevorg Tarakhchyan (from (Armenia) BKMA Yerevan)

Out: Note: Flags indicate national team as defined under FIFA eligibility rules; some limited exceptions apply. Players may hold more than one non-FIFA nationality.

No.	Pos.	Nation	Player
11	FW	ARM	Narek Grigoryan (to (Romania) Farul Constanța)
13	FW	UKR	Dmytro Khlyobas (to (Kazakhstan) Kyzylzhar)
15	FW	RUS	Maksim Mayrovich (to (Russia) Chelyabinsk)
24	GK	ARM	Arsen Beglaryan (to Ararat-Armenia)
27	MF	RUS	David Khurtsidze (to (Armenia) Alashkert)
35	DF	BRA	Rafael Carioca (to (Brazil) Floresta)
67	DF	UKR	Vadym Paramonov
—	DF	ARM	Khariton Azvazyan (on loan to (Armenia) BKMA Yerevan)
—	MF	ARM	Ruben Yesayan (on loan to (Armenia) BKMA Yerevan, previously on loan to (Armenia) Noah)
—	MF	ARM	Robert Baghramyan (to (Armenia) Noah)

=== Van ===
In: Note: Flags indicate national team as defined under FIFA eligibility rules; some limited exceptions apply. Players may hold more than one non-FIFA nationality.

No.	Pos.	Nation	Player
1	GK	UKR	Ibrahim Suaib (from (Germany) Mecklenburg Schwerin)
2	DF	ARM	Hovhannes Nazaryan (from (Armenia) Ararat Yerevan)
5	DF	NGA	Deou Dosa (from (Armenia) Lernayin Artsakh)
6	DF	ARM	Armen Manucharyan (resigned 19 September 2023)
7	MF	ARM	Davit Petrosyan (on loan from Ararat-Armenia)
9	MF	ARM	Benik Hovhannisyan
10	FW	CIV	Ipehe Williams (loan return from (Armenia) Lernayin Artsakh)
12	GK	ARM	Arman Meliksetyan
19	FW	ARM	Vrezh Chiloyan (on loan from (Armenia) Pyunik)
20	FW	RSA	Jaisen Clifford
23	MF	ARM	Albert Mnatsakanyan
24	GK	GHA	Raymond Nsoh (from (Russia) FDC Vista)
30	MF	RUS	Anton Sholokh (from (Russia) Dynamo St.Petersburg)
45	GK	ARM	Aram Ter-Minasyan (from (Armenia) Pyunik)
70	MF	NGA	Olaoluwa Ojetunde (from (Armenia) Lernayin Artsakh)
87	FW	ARM	Grisha Paronyan (from (Russia) Strogino Moscow)
88	DF	SRB	Kristian Mocic (from (Serbia) Budućnost Valjevo)
94	DF	NGA	Chukwuebuka Okoronkwo
99	DF	ARM	Arsen Yeghiazaryan (from (Russia) Peresvet Domodedovo)

Out: Note: Flags indicate national team as defined under FIFA eligibility rules; some limited exceptions apply. Players may hold more than one non-FIFA nationality.

No.	Pos.	Nation	Player
1	GK	RUS	Samur Agamagomedov
2	DF	ARM	Vaspurak Minasyan (to (Armenia) Noah)
3	DF	ARM	Artur Kartashyan (to (Tajikistan) Istiklol)
5	DF	ARM	Armen Manucharyan
7	FW	ARM	Edgar Movsesyan (to (Armenia) Noah)
8	MF	ARM	Rumyan Hovsepyan (to (Armenia) Noah)
9	FW	KAZ	Danil Ankudinov (loan return to (Moldova) Sheriff Tiraspol)}
19	MF	KAZ	Gevorg Najaryan (to (Kazakhstan) Atyrau)
22	GK	BOL	Diego Zamora (to (Bolivia) CD Sur-Car)
23	MF	RUS	Pavel Gorelov (loan return to (Russia) Rostov)
30	DF	ARG	Manuel Morello
70	FW	VEN	Wilson Barrios
87	MF	ARM	Gegham Kadimyan
90	FW	NGA	Bismark Ubah (to (Bolivia) Jorge Wilstermann)
—	MF	EQG	Renato Bengo

=== West Armenia ===
In: Note: Flags indicate national team as defined under FIFA eligibility rules; some limited exceptions apply. Players may hold more than one non-FIFA nationality.

No.	Pos.	Nation	Player
3	DF	ARM	Yuri Martirosyan (from (Armenia) BKMA Yerevan)
4	MF	RUS	Mikhail Strelnik (from (Russia) SKA Rostov-on-Don)
6	MF	ARM	Vahram Makhsudyan (on loan from Ararat-Armenia)
7	FW	BRA	Léo Pará (from (Brazil) Semeta)
11	FW	RUS	Zakhar Tarasenko (from (Russia) KAMAZ)
12	FW	TAN	Athuman Yusuph Shabani (from (Tanzania) Young Africans)
13	GK	ARM	Gor Manukyan (from (Armenia) Ararat Yerevan)
16	MF	TAN	Edson Eric Mwijage (from (Tanzania) Kagera Sugar)
23	DF	BRA	Caxambu (from (Brazil) São Bento)
26	DF	ARM	Arman Khachatryan (from (Armenia) Alashkert)
38	GK	BRA	Filipe (from (Brazil) Maringá)
88	MF	BRA	André Mensalão (from (Cyprus) Ethnikos Achna)
99	FW	BRA	Eydison (from (Brazil) Azuriz)

Out: Note: Flags indicate national team as defined under FIFA eligibility rules; some limited exceptions apply. Players may hold more than one non-FIFA nationality.

No.	Pos.	Nation	Player
7	MF	ARM	Arsen Hovhannisyan (to (Armenia) Onor)
88	MF	RUS	Artem Kiba (to (Armenia) Shirak)
