= List of Armenian football transfers winter 2023–24 =

This is a list of Armenian football transfers in the winter transfer window, by club. Only clubs of the 2023–24 Armenian Premier League are included.

== Armenian Premier League 2023–24 ==
=== Alashkert ===
In: Note: Flags indicate national team as defined under FIFA eligibility rules; some limited exceptions apply. Players may hold more than one non-FIFA nationality.

No.	Pos.	Nation	Player
9	FW	HAI	Jonel Désiré (from (Georgia (country)) Telavi)
11	MF	BRA	Gustavo Marmentini (from (Armenia) Pyunik)
21	FW	RUS	Artur Sokhiyev (from (Russia) Biolog-Novokubansk)
22	GK	RUS	Vsevolod Ermakov (from Ararat-Armenia)
27	DF	UKR	Vadym Paramonov
33	DF	GEO	Revaz Chiteishvili (from (Georgia (country)) Dila Gori)
77	MF	MKD	Stefan Ashkovski

Out: Note: Flags indicate national team as defined under FIFA eligibility rules; some limited exceptions apply. Players may hold more than one non-FIFA nationality.

No.	Pos.	Nation	Player
9	FW	GEO	Levan Kutalia
11	MF	ARM	Sargis Shahinyan (to West Armenia)
21	FW	VEN	Robinson Flores (loan return to (Venezuela) Metropolitanos)
22	GK	ARM	Ognjen Čančarević (to (Armenia) Noah)
27	DF	VEN	Daniel Carrillo (to (Venezuela) Universidad Central)
33	DF	RUS	Vitali Ustinov (to (Russia) Volga Ulyanovsk)
77	DF	CRO	Mateo Mužek (to (Bosnia and Herzegovina) Široki Brijeg)

=== Ararat-Armenia ===
In: Note: Flags indicate national team as defined under FIFA eligibility rules; some limited exceptions apply. Players may hold more than one non-FIFA nationality.

No.	Pos.	Nation	Player
8	MF	ARG	Alexis Rodríguez
9	FW	ARM	Artur Serobyan (loan return from (Portugal) Casa Pia)
21	MF	ARM	Narek Alaverdyan (loan return from (Armenia) BKMA Yerevan)
22	MF	ARM	Kamo Hovhannisyan (from (Kazakhstan) Astana)
23	MF	ARM	Zhirayr Shaghoyan (loan return from (Bulgaria) CSKA Sofia)
30	GK	MKD	Damjan Shishkovski
77	MF	ARM	Petros Avetisyan (on loan from (Russia) Khimki)

Out: Note: Flags indicate national team as defined under FIFA eligibility rules; some limited exceptions apply. Players may hold more than one non-FIFA nationality.

No.	Pos.	Nation	Player
17	FW	NGA	Matthew Gbomadu (on loan to (Armenia) Van)
32	DF	COL	Carlos Pérez (to (Ecuador) Técnico Universitario)
45	GK	RUS	Vsevolod Ermakov (to (Armenia) Alashkert)
55	MF	ARM	Hakob Hakobyan (on loan to (Armenia) Van)
—	DF	ARM	Albert Khachumyan (to (Armenia) Ararat Yerevan, previously on loan to BKMA Yerevan)
—	DF	ARM	Styopa Mkrtchyan (to (Croatia) NK Osijek, previously on loan)

=== Ararat Yerevan ===
In: Note: Flags indicate national team as defined under FIFA eligibility rules; some limited exceptions apply. Players may hold more than one non-FIFA nationality.

No.	Pos.	Nation	Player
1	GK	BRA	Tiago Gomes (from (Brazil) Bahia)
3	DF	ARM	Albert Khachumyan (from Ararat-Armenia)
10	MF	ARM	Artur Grigoryan (from (Armenia) BKMA Yerevan)
17	FW	CMR	Ramses Donfack (from (Cameroon) Coton Sport)

Out: Note: Flags indicate national team as defined under FIFA eligibility rules; some limited exceptions apply. Players may hold more than one non-FIFA nationality.

No.	Pos.	Nation	Player
3	DF	ARM	Arsen Galstyan
6	DF	ARM	Gor Arakelyan
7	FW	CIV	Mohamed Kone
13	GK	ARM	Arman Harutyunyan
22	GK	ARM	Narek Hovhannisyan
33	FW	ARM	Hamlet Minasyan (to (Armenia) Syunik)
77	FW	BUL	Georgi Babaliev (to (Bulgaria) Spartak Varna)

=== BKMA Yerevan ===
In: Note: Flags indicate national team as defined under FIFA eligibility rules; some limited exceptions apply. Players may hold more than one non-FIFA nationality.

No.	Pos.	Nation	Player
11	FW	ARM	Levon Vardanyan (on loan from (Armenia) Pyunik)
25	FW	ARM	Vyacheslav Afyan (on loan from (Armenia) Pyunik)
—	MF	ARM	Levon Bashoyan (on loan from (Armenia) Urartu)
—	MF	ARM	Garnik Minasyan (on loan from (Armenia) Urartu)

Out: Note: Flags indicate national team as defined under FIFA eligibility rules; some limited exceptions apply. Players may hold more than one non-FIFA nationality.

No.	Pos.	Nation	Player
4	DF	ARM	Albert Khachumyan (loan return to Ararat-Armenia)
10	MF	ARM	Artur Grigoryan (to (Armenia) Ararat Yerevan)
11	MF	ARM	Narek Alaverdyan (loan return to Ararat-Armenia)

=== Noah ===
In: Note: Flags indicate national team as defined under FIFA eligibility rules; some limited exceptions apply. Players may hold more than one non-FIFA nationality.

No.	Pos.	Nation	Player
22	GK	ARM	Ognjen Čančarević (from (Armenia) Alashkert)
24	FW	NZL	Logan Rogerson (from (Finland) Haka)
28	DF	BRA	Pablo Santos
—	MF	SEN	Alfred N'Diaye

Out: Note: Flags indicate national team as defined under FIFA eligibility rules; some limited exceptions apply. Players may hold more than one non-FIFA nationality.

No.	Pos.	Nation	Player
8	MF	ARM	Rumyan Hovsepyan
22	GK	CGO	Christoffer Mafoumbi
70	FW	FRA	Alexandre Llovet
91	FW	NGA	Goodnews Igbokwe (released, previously on loan to (Israel) Hapoel Ramat Gan Givatayim)

=== Pyunik ===
In: Note: Flags indicate national team as defined under FIFA eligibility rules; some limited exceptions apply. Players may hold more than one non-FIFA nationality.

No.	Pos.	Nation	Player
2	FW	BIH	Luka Juričić (on loan from (Romania) CFR Cluj)
4	MF	ARM	Solomon Udo
11	MF	ARM	Hovhannes Harutyunyan (on loan from (Russia) Sochi)
19	DF	BIH	Tarik Isić (from (Uzbekistan) Sogdiana Jizzakh)
29	MF	MDA	Eugeniu Cociuc
88	FW	CIV	Serges Déblé
—	DF	ARM	Karen Muradyan (loan return from (Armenia) Van)
—	FW	ARM	Vrezh Chiloyan (loan return from (Armenia) Van)

Out: Note: Flags indicate national team as defined under FIFA eligibility rules; some limited exceptions apply. Players may hold more than one non-FIFA nationality.

No.	Pos.	Nation	Player
11	MF	ARM	Hovhannes Harutyunyan (to (Russia) Sochi)
12	MF	BRA	Ravanelli (to (Brazil) São Bento)
19	FW	ARM	Levon Vardanyan (on loan to (Armenia) BKMA Yerevan)
21	DF	ARM	Arthur Avagyan (Retired)
22	MF	BRA	Gustavo Marmentini (to (Armenia) Alashkert)
24	FW	NGA	Taofiq Jibril (to West Armenia)
27	DF	EST	Nikita Baranov (to (Estonia) Paide Linnameeskond)
77	MF	BRA	Régis
83	FW	ARM	Vyacheslav Afyan (on loan to (Armenia) BKMA Yerevan)
—	MF	ARM	Petros Alekyan (on loan to (Armenia) Shirak)

=== Shirak ===
In: Note: Flags indicate national team as defined under FIFA eligibility rules; some limited exceptions apply. Players may hold more than one non-FIFA nationality.

No.	Pos.	Nation	Player
77	FW	CIV	Mory Kone
—	MF	ARM	Petros Alekyan (on loan from (Armenia) Pyunik)

Out: Note: Flags indicate national team as defined under FIFA eligibility rules; some limited exceptions apply. Players may hold more than one non-FIFA nationality.

No.	Pos.	Nation	Player
10	MF	SRB	Dimitrije Pobulić (to (China) Wuxi Wugo)

=== Urartu ===
In: Note: Flags indicate national team as defined under FIFA eligibility rules; some limited exceptions apply. Players may hold more than one non-FIFA nationality.

No.	Pos.	Nation	Player
8	MF	RUS	Denis Glushakov
13	MF	RUS	Vladislav Panteleyev (from (Russia) Arsenal Tula)
15	DF	RUS	Aleksandr Putsko (from (Russia) Baltika Kaliningrad)
17	FW	RUS	Aleksandr Dolgov
21	MF	UKR	Andriy Kravchuk (from (Republic of Ireland) Cork City)
23	MF	NGA	Luqman Gilmore (from (Latvia) Liepāja)
30	FW	ARG	Álvaro Veliez (from (Argentina) Deportivo Maipú)

Out: Note: Flags indicate national team as defined under FIFA eligibility rules; some limited exceptions apply. Players may hold more than one non-FIFA nationality.

No.	Pos.	Nation	Player
2	DF	GHA	Nana Antwi (to (Romania) FCSB)
13	DF	UKR	Ivan Zotko (to (Lithuania) Sūduva)
16	DF	NGA	Barry Isaac (on loan to West Armenia)
17	MF	BRA	Eduardo Teixeira (to (Brazil) Amazonas)
23	MF	ARM	Aras Özbiliz (Retired)
28	MF	RUS	Pavel Mogilevets
29	MF	ARM	Garnik Minasyan (on loan to (Armenia) BKMA Yerevan)
33	MF	BRA	Marcos Júnior (to (Brazil) Náutico)
55	FW	RUS	Artyom Maksimenko (to (Russia) Sokol Saratov)
56	MF	ARM	Levon Bashoyan (on loan to (Armenia) BKMA Yerevan)
99	FW	FRA	Yaya Sanogo (to (China) Qingdao Red Lions)

=== Van ===
In: Note: Flags indicate national team as defined under FIFA eligibility rules; some limited exceptions apply. Players may hold more than one non-FIFA nationality.

No.	Pos.	Nation	Player
1	GK	SRB	Miloš Čupić (from (Serbia) Inđija)
5	DF	SRB	Nemanja Kojcic (from (Serbia) Novi Pazar)
7	MF	ARM	Edgar Piloyan (from (Russia) Krasnodar-2)
8	DF	COL	Jefferson Granado (from (Bulgaria) Botev Plovdiv)
11	FW	NGA	Matthew Gbomadu (on loan from Ararat-Armenia)
12	GK	RUS	Aleksey Ploshchadny (from (Russia) Krasnodar)
20	FW	GUI	Momo Touré
55	MF	ARM	Hakob Hakobyan (on loan from Ararat-Armenia)
88	MF	POR	Serginho (from (Italy) SSD Casarano)
—	GK	ARM	Vardan Shahatuni (from (Armenia) Cilicia)
—	MF	GHA	Boah Collins (on loan from (Ghana) Dreams)
—	FW	ARM	Grigor Muradyan (from (Armenia) Ararat Yerevan)

Out: Note: Flags indicate national team as defined under FIFA eligibility rules; some limited exceptions apply. Players may hold more than one non-FIFA nationality.

No.	Pos.	Nation	Player
5	DF	NGA	Deou Dosa (to (Armenia) Lernayin Artsakh)
8	DF	ARM	Karen Muradyan (loan return to (Armenia) Pyunik)
11	MF	ARM	David Manoyan (to (Armenia) Cilicia)
12	GK	ARM	Arman Meliksetyan
19	FW	ARM	Vrezh Chiloyan (loan return to (Armenia) Pyunik)
20	FW	RSA	Jaisen Clifford
21	DF	COL	Daniel Cifuentes (to (Argentina) Ferro Carril Oeste)
33	DF	ARM	Hamlet Asoyan (to (Armenia) Lernayin Artsakh)
87	FW	ARM	Grisha Paronyan
88	DF	SRB	Kristian Močić
94	DF	NGA	Chukwuebuka Okoronkwo (to West Armenia)

=== West Armenia ===
In: Note: Flags indicate national team as defined under FIFA eligibility rules; some limited exceptions apply. Players may hold more than one non-FIFA nationality.

No.	Pos.	Nation	Player
1	GK	RUS	Nikolai Rybikov (from (Russia) Volgar Astrakhan)
3	DF	RUS	Matvey Guyganov (from (Russia) Sevastopol)
7	DF	NGA	Barry Isaac (on loan from (Armenia) Urartu)
8	MF	ARM	Sargis Shahinyan (from (Armenia) Alashkert)
10	MF	UKR	Vladyslav Khomutov (from (Georgia (country)) Gagra)
15	DF	CIV	Salia Kader Traore
16	DF	ARM	Robert Hakobyan (from (Armenia) Shirak)
19	FW	ARM	Sargis Metoyan (Re-signed)
22	DF	ITA	Stefano Crivellaro (from (Italy) Alessandria)
30	FW	MLI	Hadji Dramé
31	MF	CIV	Adama Samake (from (Armenia) Lernayin Artsakh)
87	DF	RUS	Aleksey Kayukov
94	DF	NGA	Chukwuebuka Okoronkwo (from (Armenia) Van)
—	FW	NGA	Taofiq Jibril (from (Armenia) Pyunik)

Out: Note: Flags indicate national team as defined under FIFA eligibility rules; some limited exceptions apply. Players may hold more than one non-FIFA nationality.

No.	Pos.	Nation	Player
3	DF	ARM	Gagik Daghbashyan
7	FW	BRA	Léo Pará (to (Brazil) Caeté)
8	MF	RUS	Zalim Makoev
10	FW	ARM	Artyom Gevorkyan
12	FW	TAN	Athuman Yusuph Shabani
16	FW	TAN	Edson Eric Mwijage (to (Tanzania) Geita Gold)
19	FW	ARM	Sargis Metoyan
22	MF	RUS	Dato Cherkoev
23	DF	BRA	Caxambu (to (Brazil) Juventus)
33	MF	RUS	Erik Karapetyan
38	GK	BRA	Filipe (to (Brazil) Marcílio Dias)
69	DF	RUS	Maks Dziov (to (Belarus) Dynamo Brest)
88	MF	BRA	André Mensalão (to (North Macedonia) Voska Sport)
90	FW	RUS	Arsen Tsogoev
99	FW	BRA	Eydison (to (Thailand) Bangkok)
