= 2023–24 FC West Armenia season =

West Armenia
2023–24 season
- Stadium: Junior Sport Stadium
- Premier League: 7th
- Armenian Cup: Second round
- Top goalscorer: League: Zakhar Tarasenko (8); All: Zakhar Tarasenko (8)

The 2023–24 season was FC West Armenia's fourth season playing in the Armenian football system, and first in the Armenian Premier League.

== Season events ==
On 27 July, West Armenia announced the signing of Athuman Yusuph Shabani from Young Africans, and the signing of Edson Eric Mwijage from Kagera Sugar. The following day, 28 July, Gor Manukyan joined West Armenia from Ararat Yerevan.

On 29 July, West Armenia announced the signing of Mikhail Strelnik from SKA Rostov-on-Don, and Zakhar Tarasenko from KAMAZ.

On 2 August, West Armenia announced the signing of Yuri Martirosyan from BKMA Yerevan, and the loan signing of Vahram Makhsudyan from Ararat-Armenia.

On 11 August, West Armenia announced the signing of André Mensalão from Ethnikos Achna, and the signing of Eydison from Azuriz.

On 8 September, West Armenia announced the signing of Filipe from Maringá.

On 11 September, West Armenia announced the signing of Caxambu from São Bento, with Léo Pará signing from Semeta and Arman Khachatryan from Alashkert two days later on 13 September.

On 18 December, West Armenia announced the departure of Edson Eric Mwijage, Athuman Yusuph Shabani, Caxambu, André Mensalão and Eydison.

On 20 December, West Armenia announced the departure of Gagik Daghbashyan, Zalim Makoev, Erik Karapetyan, Artyom Gevorkyan and Sargis Metoyan.

On 22 December, West Armenia announced the signing of free agent Hadji Dramé.

On 23 January, West Armenia announced that they had re-signed Sargis Metoyan, on a 2.5-year contract.

On 25 January, West Armenia announced the signing of free-agent Sargis Shahinyan, who'd recently played for Alashkert.

On 8 February, West Armenia announced the signing of Nikolai Rybikov from Volgar Astrakhan.

On 23 February, West Armenia announced the signing of Chukwuebuka Okoronkwo from Van, Robert Hakobyan from Shirak, Stefano Crivellaro from Alessandria, Vladyslav Khomutov from Gagra and Matvey Guyganov from Sevastopol. On the same day, Urartu announced that Barry Isaac would spend the remainder of the season on loan at West Armenia.

On 4 March, West Armenia announced the signing of free-agent Salia Kader Traore and Taofiq Jibril from Pyunik.

On 8 March, West Armenia announced the signing of Chidera Oparaocha to a 2.5year contract.

== Squad ==
As of match played 25 May 2024

Number	Name	Nationality	Position	Date of birth (age)	Signed from	Signed in	Contract ends	Apps.	Goals
Goalkeepers
1	Nikolai Rybikov	(Russia)	GK	5 January 2000 (aged 24)	Volgar Astrakhan	2024		13	0
13	Gor Manukyan	(Armenia)	GK	27 September 1993 (aged 30)	Ararat Yerevan	2023		11	0
Defenders
2	Yuri Martirosyan	(Armenia)	DF	8 June 2003 (aged 20)	BKMA Yerevan	2023			
5	Edmon Movsisyan	(Armenia)	DF	1 June 1998 (aged 25)	Alashkert	2023			
7	Barry Isaac	(Nigeria)	DF	21 August 2001 (aged 22)	on loan from Urartu	2024		14	1
15	Salia Kader Traore	(Ivory Coast)	DF	25 January 2004 (aged 20)	Unattached	2024		2	0
16	Robert Hakobyan	(Armenia)	DF	22 October 1996 (aged 27)	Unattached	2024		13	0
22	Stefano Crivellaro	(Italy)	DF	22 January 2002 (aged 22)	Alessandria	2024		13	1
24	Hayk Sargsyan	(Armenia)	DF	12 March 1998 (aged 26)	Alashkert	2023			
26	Arman Khachatryan	(Armenia)	DF	9 June 1997 (aged 26)	Alashkert	2023		28	1
87	Aleksey Kayukov	(Russia)	DF	9 February 1993 (aged 31)	Unattached	2024		4	0
94	Chukwuebuka Okoronkwo	(Nigeria)	DF	15 January 2000 (aged 24)	Van	2024		10	0
Midfielders
3	Matvey Guyganov	(Russia)	MF	28 July 1994 (aged 29)	Sevastopol	2024		4	0
4	Mikhail Strelnik	(Russia)	MF	27 May 2000 (aged 23)	SKA Rostov-on-Don	2023		37	3
6	Vahram Makhsudyan	(Armenia)	MF	22 January 2003 (aged 21)	on loan from Ararat-Armenia	2023		13	0
8	Sargis Shahinyan	(Armenia)	MF	10 September 1995 (aged 28)	Unattached	2024		4	0
9	Aram Loretsyan	(Armenia)	MF	7 March 1993 (aged 31)	Sevan	2021			
10	Vladyslav Khomutov	(Ukraine)	MF	4 June 1998 (aged 25)	Gagra	2024		9	0
14	Julius David Ufuoma	(Nigeria)	MF	14 February 2000 (aged 24)	Unattached	2023			
21	Spartak Hayrapetyan	(Armenia)	MF	11 April 2003 (aged 21)	on loan from Ararat-Armenia	2023		6	0
31	Adama Samake	(Ivory Coast)	MF	19 May 1999 (aged 25)	Lernayin Artsakh	2024		9	0
37	Sunday Kalu	(Nigeria)	MF	5 March 2002 (aged 22)	Unattached	2024		4	0
Forwards
11	Zakhar Tarasenko	(Russia)	FW	12 October 1997 (aged 26)	KAMAZ	2023		34	8
19	Sargis Metoyan	(Armenia)	FW	6 September 1997 (aged 26)	Unattached	2024	2026		
30	Hadji Dramé	(Mali)	FW	10 September 2000 (aged 23)	Unattached	2023		14	1
35	Taofiq Jibril	(Nigeria)	FW	23 April 1998 (aged 26)	Pyunik	2024		3	0
36	Chidera Oparaocha	(Nigeria)	FW	7 January 2002 (aged 22)	Unattached	2024	2026	13	4
Players away on loan
Players who left during the season
1	Khachatur Manukyan	(Armenia)	GK	9 November 1999 (aged 24)	Gandzasar Kapan	2022			
3	Gagik Daghbashyan	(Armenia)	DF	19 October 1990 (aged 33)	Alashkert	2022			
7	Léo Pará	(Brazil)	FW	22 June 1994 (aged 29)	Maringá	2023		4	0
8	Zalim Makoev	(Russia)	DF	24 August 1994 (aged 29)	Spartak Nalchik	2023		15	0
10	Artyom Gevorkyan	(Armenia)	FW	21 May 1993 (aged 31)	Shirak	2023			
12	Athuman Yusuph Shabani	(Tanzania)	FW	28 February 2003 (aged 21)	Young Africans	2023		0	0
16	Edson Eric Mwijage	(Tanzania)	FW	15 November 2001 (aged 22)	Kagera Sugar	2023		15	1
22	Dato Cherkoev	(Russia)	MF	1 April 1999 (aged 25)	Spartak Nalchik	2023			
23	Caxambu	(Brazil)	DF	23 January 1997 (aged 27)	São Bento	2023		12	0
31	Vladimir Kharatyan	(Russia)	DF	14 July 1996 (aged 27)	Lernayin Artsakh	2023			
33	Erik Karapetyan	(Russia)	MF	7 March 1993 (aged 31)	Essentuki	2021			
38	Filipe	(Brazil)	GK	31 January 1998 (aged 26)	Maringá	2023		15	0
69	Maks Dziov	(Russia)	DF	9 August 2001 (aged 22)	Dynamo Stavropol	2022			
88	André Mensalão	(Brazil)	MF	21 June 1990 (aged 33)	Ethnikos Achna	2023		19	4
90	Arsen Tsogoev	(Russia)	FW	1 October 2001 (aged 22)	Alania-2 Vladikavkaz	2023			
99	Eydison	(Brazil)	FW	30 May 1988 (aged 35)	Azuriz	2023		18	2

== Transfers ==
=== In ===
Date	Position	Nationality	Name	From	Fee	Ref.
27 July 2023	FW	(Tanzania)	Athuman Yusuph Shabani	Young Africans	Undisclosed	
27 July 2023	FW	(Tanzania)	Edson Eric Mwijage	Kagera Sugar	Undisclosed	
28 July 2023	GK	(Armenia)	Gor Manukyan	Ararat Yerevan	Undisclosed	
29 July 2023	DF	(Russia)	Zalim Makoev	Spartak Nalchik	Undisclosed	
29 July 2023	MF	(Russia)	Mikhail Strelnik	SKA Rostov-on-Don	Undisclosed	
29 July 2023	FW	(Russia)	Zakhar Tarasenko	KAMAZ	Undisclosed	
2 August 2023	MF	(Armenia)	Yuri Martirosyan	BKMA Yerevan	Undisclosed	
11 August 2023	MF	(Brazil)	André Mensalão	Ethnikos Achna	Undisclosed	
11 August 2023	FW	(Brazil)	Eydison	Azuriz	Undisclosed	
8 September 2023	GK	(Brazil)	Filipe	Maringá	Undisclosed	
11 September 2023	DF	(Brazil)	Caxambu	São Bento	Undisclosed	
13 September 2023	DF	(Armenia)	Arman Khachatryan	Alashkert	Undisclosed	
13 September 2023	FW	(Brazil)	Léo Pará	Maringá	Undisclosed	
22 December 2023	FW	(Mali)	Hadji Dramé	Unattached	Free	
23 January 2024	FW	(Armenia)	Sargis Metoyan	Unattached	Free	
25 January 2024	MF	(Armenia)	Sargis Shahinyan	Unattached	Free	
8 February 2024	GK	(Russia)	Nikolai Rybikov	Volgar Astrakhan	Undisclosed	
23 February 2024	DF	(Armenia)	Robert Hakobyan	Shirak	Undisclosed	
23 February 2024	DF	(Italy)	Stefano Crivellaro	Alessandria	Undisclosed	
23 February 2024	DF	(Nigeria)	Chukwuebuka Okoronkwo	Van	Undisclosed	
23 February 2024	DF	(Russia)	Matvey Guyganov	Sevastopol	Undisclosed	
23 February 2024	MF	(Ukraine)	Vladyslav Khomutov	Gagra	Undisclosed	
23 February 2024	MF	(Ivory Coast)	Adama Samake	Lernayin Artsakh	Undisclosed	
4 March 2024	MF	(Ivory Coast)	Salia Kader Traore	Unattached	Free	
4 March 2024	MF	(Nigeria)	Sunday Kalu	Unattached	Free	
4 March 2024	FW	(Nigeria)	Taofiq Jibril	Pyunik	Undisclosed	
8 March 2024	FW	(Nigeria)	Chidera Oparaocha	Unattached	Free	

=== Loans in ===
Date from	Position	Nationality	Name	From	Date to	Ref.
2 August 2023	MF	(Armenia)	Vahram Makhsudyan	Ararat-Armenia	End of season	
23 February 2024	DF	(Nigeria)	Barry Isaac	Urartu	End of season	

=== Out ===
Date	Position	Nationality	Name	To	Fee	Ref.
2 February 2023	GK	(Brazil)	Filipe	Marcílio Dias	Undisclosed	

=== Released ===
Date	Position	Nationality	Name	Joined	Date	Ref.
18 December 2023	DF	(Brazil)	Caxambu	Juventus		
18 December 2023	DF	(Brazil)	André Mensalão	Voska Sport	13 January 2024	
18 December 2023	DF	(Brazil)	Eydison	Bangkok	5 January 2024	
18 December 2023	DF	(Tanzania)	Athuman Yusuph Shabani	Fountain Gate	27 December 2024	
18 December 2023	DF	(Tanzania)	Edson Eric Mwijage	Geita Gold		
20 December 2023	DF	(Armenia)	Gagik Daghbashyan			
20 December 2023	DF	(Russia)	Zalim Makoev	Dynamo Stavropol		
20 December 2023	MF	(Russia)	Erik Karapetyan			
20 December 2023	FW	(Armenia)	Artyom Gevorkyan			
20 December 2023	FW	(Armenia)	Sargis Metoyan	Re-Signed	23 January 2024	
31 December 2023	DF	(Russia)	Maks Dziov	Dynamo Brest	12 February 2024	
31 December 2023	MF	(Russia)	Dato Cherkoev	Belshina Bobruisk		
31 December 2023	FW	(Brazil)	Léo Pará	Caeté		
31 December 2023	FW	(Russia)	Arsen Tsogoev	Biolog-Novokubansk		

== Friendlies ==
8 July 2023	Ararat Yerevan	4–1	West Armenia	Dzoraghbyur
11:00 (UTC+4)	Kone 35'; Mkrtchyan 45'; Mahmoud 48'; Trialist 35'	Report	Goal	Stadium: Dzoraghbyur Training Centre

20 January 2024	Ararat Yerevan	0–2	West Armenia	Dzoraghbyur
13:00 (UTC+4)		Report		Stadium: Dzoraghbyur Training Centre

27 January 2024	BKMA Yerevan	0–2	West Armenia	Yerevan
12:00 (UTC+4)		Report		Stadium: Avan Academy Stadium

5 February 2024	Gandzasar Kapan	3–1	West Armenia	Yerevan
13:00 (UTC+4)		Report		Stadium: Junior Sport Stadium

8 February 2024	West Armenia	2–1	Syunik	Yerevan
12:00 (UTC+4)		Report		Stadium: Khoren Hovhannisyan Academy

12 February 2024	Van	2–1	West Armenia	Charentsavan
13:00 (UTC+4)	Hovhannisyan; Touré	Report	Goal	Stadium: Charentsavan City Stadium

17 February 2024	Alashkert	3–0	West Armenia	Yerevan
16:30 (UTC+4)	Nalbandyan; Désiré (pen.); Agdon	Report	Penalty missed	Stadium: Alashkert Stadium

== Competitions ==
=== Overall record ===
Competition	First match	Last match	Starting round	Final position	Record							
Competition	First match	Last match	Starting round	Final position	Pld	W	D	L	GF	GA	GD	Win %
Premier League	29 July 2023	25 May 2024	Matchday 1	7th	36	11	4	21	43	73	−30	30.56
Armenian Cup	8 October 2023	23 November 2023	First Round	Second Round	2	1	0	1	2	2	+0	50.00
Total					38	12	4	22	45	75	−30	31.58

Last updated: 25 May 2024
Source: Competitions

=== Premier League ===
==== Results summary ====
Overall								Home						Away					
Pld	W	D	L	GF	GA	GD	Pts	W	D	L	GF	GA	GD	W	D	L	GF	GA	GD
36	11	4	21	42	71	−29	37	7	2	11	27	41	−14	4	2	10	15	30	−15

Last updated: 25 May 2024.
Source: See Results

==== Results by round ====
Round	1	2	3	4	5	6	7	8	9	10	11	12	13	14	15	16	17	18	19	20	21	22	23	24	25	26	27	28	29	30	31	32	33	34	35	36
Ground	H	H	A	H	A	H	H	A	H	A	A	H	A	H	A	A	H	A	A	H	A	H	A	A	H	A	H	H	A	H	H	H	H	A	H	A
Result	L	L	L	L	L	L	W	W	L	D	L	L	L	L	W	L	W	L	W	D	L	D	L	W	W	D	L	W	W	L	L	L	W	L	W	L
Position	8	10	10	10	10	10	10	8	8	8	9	9	9	9	9	10	8	9	8	8	9	8	10	10	8	8	7	7	7	7	7	7	7	7	7	7

Updated to match(es) played on 25 May 2024. Source: See Results
A = Away; H = Home; W = Win; D = Draw; L = Loss; V = Void

==== Results ====
29 July 2023 1	West Armenia	2–4	Shirak	Yerevan
17:00 (UTC+4)	Gevorkyan 8'; Metoyan 9'; Makoev (yellow card) 45+1' (yellow-red card) 45+3'; Karapetyan (yellow card) 45+7'; Kharatyan (yellow card) 54'; Strelnik (yellow card) 90+10'	Report	Kodia (yellow card) 11' (goal) 90+6'; Urushanyan 18', 69' (yellow card) 45+1'; Mryan 41'; Sadoyan (yellow card) 90+3'	Stadium: Junior Sports Stadium; Referee: Artem Gasparyan

7 August 2023 2	West Armenia	1–4	Alashkert	Yerevan
18:00 (UTC+4)	A.Loretsyan (yellow card) 45+2'; Metoyan 45+3'; Gevorkyan (yellow card) 49'; Mwijage (yellow card) 53'	Report	Kutalia 18' (pen.), 23' (pen.); Kocharyan (red card) 46'; Gareginyan (yellow card) 72'; Racines 83'; Khurtsidze 90+3'	Stadium: Junior Sports Stadium; Referee: Vardan Manukyan

12 August 2023 3	Ararat Yerevan	1–0	West Armenia	Yerevan
19:00 (UTC+4)	Ufuoma 21' (o.g.); Nahapetyan (yellow card) 74'; Faye (yellow card) 88'; Malakyan (yellow card) 90+4'	Report	Dziov (yellow card) 67'; Karapetyan (yellow card) 77'; Tarasenko (yellow card) 90+3'	Stadium: Republican Stadium; Referee: Zaven Hovhannisyan

20 August 2023 4	West Armenia	1–4	Ararat-Armenia	Yerevan
17:00 (UTC+4)	Movsisyan 41'; Metoyan (yellow card) 45+4'; Strelnik (yellow card) 56'	Report	Castanheira (yellow card) 37'; Nondi (yellow card) 45+3'; Scheid (yellow card) 45+4'; Avanesyan 53'; Yenne 58', 86'; Eza 79'; Terteryan (yellow card) 82'; Yattara (yellow card) 90+3'	Stadium: Junior Sports Stadium; Referee: Davit Mkrtchyan

28 August 2023 5	Pyunik	3–0	West Armenia	Yerevan
19:00 (UTC+4)	Dashyan (yellow card) 49'; Otubanjo (yellow card) 63' (goal) 69', 78' (pen.); Villela 65'	Report	Movsisyan (yellow card) 53' (red card) 76'; Dziov (yellow card) 90'	Stadium: Urartu Stadium; Referee: Ashot Harutyunyan

1 September 2023 6	West Armenia	2–5	Urartu	Yerevan
17:00 (UTC+4)	Metoyan 4'; Eydison (yellow card) 7'; Gevorkyan (yellow card) 47' (goal) 85' (pen.); Mensalão (yellow card) 53'; Kharatyan (yellow card) 72'; Makhsudyan (yellow card) 90+4'	Report	Sabua 52' (pen.) (yellow card) 55'; Dzhikiya 70', 87' (pen.), 90+1'; Piloyan (yellow card) 82'; Maksimenko 90+7' (pen.)	Stadium: Junior Sport Stadium; Referee: Hovhannes Kalantaryan

14 September 2023 7	West Armenia	2–0	Van	Yerevan
14:00 (UTC+4)	Tarasenko 45' (yellow card) 55'; Gevorkyan (yellow card) 61'; Movsisyan (yellow card) 65'; Eydison 81'; Makhsudyan (yellow card) 88'	Report	Chiloyan (yellow card) 65'; Gaba (yellow card) 68'	Stadium: Junior Sports Stadium; Referee: Ashot Ghaltakhchyan

20 September 2023 8	BKMA Yerevan	0–4	West Armenia	Yerevan
18:00 (UTC+4)	Nikoghosyan (yellow card) 83'; Alaverdyan (yellow card) 90+4'	Report	Mensalão 62'; Dziov 79'; Movsisyan 85'; Metoyan 90'	Stadium: FFA Stadium; Referee: Davit Mkrtchyan

26 September 2023 9	West Armenia	2–4	Noah	Yerevan
16:00 (UTC+4)	Ufuoma (yellow card) 37'; Movsisyan 53' (yellow card) 60' (yellow-red card) 66'; Dziov (yellow card) 60' (goal) 61'	Report	Miljković 11'; Alhaft 38'; Miranyan 41' (pen.); Gladon 67' (pen.)	Stadium: Junior Sport Stadium; Referee: Vardan Manukyan

30 September 2023 10	Shirak	0–0	West Armenia	Gyumri
19:00 (UTC+4)	Misakyan (yellow card) 44'; Mkoyan (yellow card) 69'	Report	Makhsudyan (yellow card) 42'; Kharatyan (yellow card) 75'; Filipe (yellow card) 76'	Stadium: City Stadium; Referee: Artem Gasparyan

4 October 2023 11	Alashkert	2–0	West Armenia	Yerevan
15:00 (UTC+4)	Kutalia (penalty missed) 7' 52'; Kocharyan (yellow card) 31'; Khurtsidze 45+1'; Mensah (yellow card) 50'	Report	Mensalão (yellow card) 33'	Stadium: Alashkert Stadium; Referee: Artem Gasparyan

19 October 2023 12	West Armenia	0–2	Ararat Yerevan	Yerevan
15:00 (UTC+4)	Khachatryan (yellow card) 51'	Report	Mkrtchyan (yellow card) 10'; Ransom (yellow card) 53'; Nahapetyan 57' (pen.); Lhernault 68'; Lemajic (yellow card) 85'	Stadium: Junior Sport Stadium; Referee: Ashot Ghaltakhchyan

24 October 2023 13	Ararat-Armenia	4–0	West Armenia	Yerevan
16:00 (UTC+4)	Yattara 2', 32'; Kharatyan 19' (o.g.); Alemão (yellow card) 64'; Ayvazyan 87'	Report	Strelnik (yellow card) 28'; Mwijage (yellow card) 47'	Stadium: FFA Stadium; Referee: Ashot Harutyunyan

29 October 2023 14	West Armenia	2–3	Pyunik	Yerevan
14:00 (UTC+4)	Ufuoma (yellow card) 45+2'; Mensalão 47'; Tarasenko 90+2'	Report	Hendriks 17'; Harutyunyan 45+1' (pen.); James (yellow card) 80' (goal) 87'	Stadium: Junior Sports Stadium; Referee: Hovhannes Kalantaryan

3 November 2023 15	Urartu	1–2	West Armenia	Yerevan
16:00 (UTC+4)	Maksimenko 36' (pen.); Zotko (yellow card) 64'; Pešukić (yellow card) 90+5'	Report	Kharatyan (yellow card) 69'; Tarasenko 90'; Caxambu (yellow card) 90+5'; Ufuoma (yellow card) 90+5'; Loretsyan 90+9' (pen.)	Stadium: Urartu Stadium; Referee: Vardan Vardumyan

7 November 2023 16	Van	4–1	West Armenia	Charentsavan
14:30 (UTC+4)	Okoronkwo (yellow card) 29'; Manucharyan (yellow card) 43'; Chiloyan (yellow card) 81' (goal) 85' (pen.), 90+4'; Ojetunde 89'; Boniface 90+8'	Report	Mensalão 4' (pen.); Dziov (yellow card) 45+1'	Stadium: City Stadium; Referee: Ashot Harutyunyan

10 November 2023 17	West Armenia	1–0	BKMA Yerevan	Yerevan
14:30 (UTC+4)	Strelnik 11'; Ufuoma (yellow card) 29'; Movsisyan (yellow card) 69'; Filipe (yellow card) 88'	Report	Alaverdyan (yellow card) 45+5'; Khachumyan (yellow card) 88'	Stadium: Junior Sports Stadium; Referee: Zaven Hovhannisyan

29 November 2023 18	Noah	5–1	West Armenia	Abovyan
16:00 (UTC+4)	Manvelyan 33'; Miranyan 69' (pen.), 71', 90+1'; Mathieu 90+5'	Report	Mensalão 28' (pen.); Khachatryan (yellow card) 44'; Strelnik (yellow card) 45+1'; Kharatyan (yellow card) 68'	Stadium: City Stadium; Referee: Sargis Khachatryan

5 December 2023 19	Shirak	1–2	West Armenia	Gyumri
18:00 (UTC+4)	Traore (yellow card) 45+2'; Vidić (yellow card) 45+7'; Sumbulyan 61'; Mryan (yellow card) 90+15'	Report	Eydison 9'; Ufuoma (yellow card) 60'; Metoyan 76'; Dziov (yellow card) 82'; Caxambu (yellow card) 90+14'	Stadium: City Stadium; Referee: Yura Mahtesyan

10 December 2023 20	West Armenia	1–1	Alashkert	Yerevan
14:00 (UTC+4)	Strelnik (yellow card) 27' (goal) 77'; Caxambu (yellow card) 86'; Filipe (yellow card) 90+5'	Report	Ustinov 18'; Mensah (yellow card) 75'	Stadium: Junior Sports Stadium; Referee: Vardan Manukyan

24 February 2024 21	Ararat Yerevan	1–0	West Armenia	Yerevan
17:00 (UTC+4)	Ransom 59' (pen.)	Report	Okoronkwo (yellow card) 62'; Tarasenko (yellow card) 65'; Metoyan (yellow card) 85'	Stadium: Republican Stadium; Referee: Zaven Hovhannisyan

28 February 2024 22	West Armenia	1–1	Ararat-Armenia	Yerevan
15:00 (UTC+4)	Khomutov (yellow card) 45+5'; Ufuoma (yellow card) 60'; Metoyan 87'	Report	Tera 39'; Kipiani (yellow card) 64'; Yenne (yellow card) 68'; Nondi (yellow card) 90+8'	Stadium: FFA Stadium; Referee: Davit Mkrtchyan

4 March 2024 23	Pyunik	2–1	West Armenia	Yerevan
15:00 (UTC+4)	Dashyan 42'; Juričić (yellow card) 64'; Déblé 77'; Gonçalves (yellow card) 90+2'; James (yellow card) 90+4'; Grigoryan (yellow card) 90+4'	Report	Ufuoma 39'; Okoronkwo (yellow card) 63'; Strelnik (yellow card) 70'; Isaac (yellow card) 90'; Sargsyan (yellow card) 90+9'	Stadium: Junior Sports Stadium; Referee: Hovhannes Kalantaryan

8 March 2024 24	Urartu	1–2	West Armenia	Yerevan
18:00 (UTC+4)	Tarakhchyan 48'	Report	Guyganov (yellow card) 50'; Tarasenko 55'; Khachatryan (yellow card) 64'; Ufuoma (yellow card) 78'; Oparaocha 90'; Rybikov (yellow card) 90+5'	Stadium: Urartu Stadium; Referee: Zaven Hovhannisyan

17 March 2024 25	West Armenia	2–0	Van	Yerevan
16:00 (UTC+4)	Strelnik 45+2' (pen.); Ufuoma (yellow card) 55'; Martirosyan (yellow card) 82'; Tarasenko 85'	Report	Piloyan (yellow card) 65'	Stadium: Junior Sports Stadium; Referee: Sargis Khachatryan

1 April 2024 26	BKMA Yerevan	1–1	West Armenia	Yerevan
17:00 (UTC+4)	A.Petrosyan (yellow card) 34'; Afyan 70'	Report	Tarasenko 18' (yellow card) 39'; Strelnik (yellow card) 44'	Stadium: FFA Stadium; Referee: Ashot Harutyunyan

5 April 2024 27	West Armenia	2–5	Noah	Yerevan
15:00 (UTC+4)	Khachatryan (yellow card) 26'; Loretsyan 72'; Oparaocha 90+3'	Report	Manvelyan 35'; Pinson 64'; Movsesyan 81', 89'; Miranyan 86'	Stadium: Junior Sports Stadium; Referee: Zaven Hovhannisyan

14 April 2024 28	West Armenia	1–0	Shirak	Yerevan
16:00 (UTC+4)	Hakobyan (yellow card) 45+3'; Oparaocha 76'; Sargsyan (yellow card) 90+9'	Report	Kone (yellow card) 38'; L.Darbinyan (yellow card) 67'; Vukašinović (red card) 84'; Alekyan (yellow card) 90+10'	Stadium: Junior Sports Stadium; Referee: Ashot Ghaltakhchyan

18 April 2024 29	Alashkert	1–2	West Armenia	Yerevan
17:00 (UTC+4)	Wbeymar (yellow card) 19'; Voskanyan (yellow card) 86'; Biai 89'	Report	Tarasenko (yellow card) 27'; Martirosyan 45+4'; Crivellaro 63'; Rybikov (yellow card) 90+4'	Stadium: Alashkert Stadium; Referee: Davit Mkrtchyan

22 April 2024 30	West Armenia	1–2	Ararat Yerevan	Yerevan
17:00 (UTC+4)	Isaac 71'; Sargsyan (yellow card) 84'; Shahinyan (yellow card) 86'	Report	Faye (yellow card) 18'; Hadji 88' (pen.); Ransom 90+2' (pen.)	Stadium: Junior Sports Stadium; Referee: Zaven Hovhannisyan

27 April 2024 31	West Armenia	0–1	Ararat-Armenia	Yerevan
16:00 (UTC+4)	Dramé (yellow card) 50'; Crivellaro (yellow card) 87'; Strelnik (yellow card) 90'	Report	Duarte 2'; Avetisyan (yellow card) 87'	Stadium: Junior Sports Stadium; Referee: Vardan Vardumyan

2 May 2024 32	West Armenia	1–4	Pyunik	Yerevan
16:00 (UTC+4)	Hakobyan (yellow card) 10'; Kayukov (yellow card) 69'; Oparaocha 74'; Sargsyan (yellow card) 90'	Report	Caraballo 21'; Hovhannisyan (yellow card) 22'; Otubanjo 42', 77', 90+2'	Stadium: Junior Sports Stadium; Referee: Artem Gasparyan

7 May 2024 33	West Armenia	1–0	Urartu	Yerevan
16:00 (UTC+4)	Ufuoma (yellow card) 39'; Tarasenko 76'	Report	Sabua (yellow card) 62'	Stadium: Junior Sports Stadium; Referee: Davit Mkrtchyan

14 May 2024 34	Van	1–0	West Armenia	Charentsavan
17:00 (UTC+4)	Boniface 8'; B.Hovhannisyan (yellow card) 78'; Hakobyan (yellow card) 80'; Yahaya (yellow card) 77' (yellow-red card) 82'; Touré (yellow card) 88'	Report	Isaac (yellow card) 32'; Hakobyan (yellow card) 76'; Oparaocha (yellow card) 90+4'	Stadium: City Stadium; Referee: Artak Vardanyan

19 May 2024 35	West Armenia	3–2	BKMA Yerevan	Yerevan
17:00 (UTC+4)	Loretsyan 53' (pen.); Khachatryan (yellow card) 60'; Metoyan (yellow card) 65'; Ufuoma 78'; Crivellaro (yellow card) 85'; Tarasenko 90+5'	Report	Aghbalyan 13'; Matinyan (yellow card) 52'; G.Petrosyan 61'; Afyan (yellow card) 83'	Stadium: Junior Sports Stadium; Referee: Ashot Harutyunyan

25 May 2024 36	Noah	3–1	West Armenia	Abovyan
17:30 (UTC+4)	Miranyan 30' (pen.); Pinson (yellow card) 69'; Pablo 79'; Mathieu 90+3'	Report	Dramé 10' (yellow card) 34'; Martirosyan (yellow card) 89'	Stadium: City Stadium; Referee: Zaven Hovhannisyan

==== Table ====
Pos	Team	Pld	W	D	L	GF	GA	GD	Pts	Qualification or relegation
1	Pyunik (C)	36	24	10	2	84	28	+56	82	Qualification for the Champions League first qualifying round
2	Noah	36	26	2	8	69	33	+36	80	Qualification for the Conference League first qualifying round
3	Ararat-Armenia	36	23	6	7	73	34	+39	75	Qualification for the Conference League second qualifying round (Note: Ararat-Armenia qualified for the Conference League second qualifying round by winning the 2023–24 Armenian Cup. Since they qualified based on league position, the second Conference League first round spot was passed to the fourth-placed team.)
4	Urartu	36	13	11	12	49	49	0	50	Qualification for the Conference League first qualifying round
5	Alashkert	36	13	6	17	54	56	−2	45	
6	Ararat Yerevan	36	13	6	17	39	50	−11	45	
7	West Armenia	36	11	4	21	43	73	−30	37	
8	Shirak	36	8	9	19	28	46	−18	33	
9	Van	36	8	8	20	32	67	−35	32	
10	BKMA	36	7	6	23	32	67	−35	27	

Source: FFA Soccerway
Rules for classification: 1) Points; 2) Head-to-head points; 3) Head-to-head goal difference; 4) Head-to-head goals scored; 5) Matches won; 6) Goal difference; 7) Less red cards; 8) Less yellow cards; 9) Fair-play ranking 10) Draw
(C) Champions

=== Armenian Cup ===
8 October 2023 First round	Lernayin Artsakh	0–1	West Armenia	Vayk
14:00 (UTC+4)	Jindoyan (yellow card) 53'; T.Hakobyan (yellow card) 88'	Report	Léo Pará (yellow card) 23'; Mwijage 27'; Movsisyan (red card) 65'; Manukyan (yellow card) 90+1'	Stadium: Arevik Stadium; Referee: Zaven Hovhannisyan

23 November 2023 Second Round	Van	2–1	West Armenia	Charentsavan
14:00 (UTC+4)	Chiloyan (yellow card) 45+9' (goal) 51'; Okoronkwo (yellow card) 45+14'; Boniface 45+20' (pen.)	Report	Khachatryan 54'	Stadium: City Stadium; Referee: Yura Mahtesyan

== Statistics ==
As of match played 25 May 2024

=== Appearances and goals ===
No.	Pos	Nat	Player	Total		Premier League		Armenian Cup	
No.	Pos	Nat	Player	Apps	Goals	Apps	Goals	Apps	Goals
1	GK	(Russia) RUS	Nikolai Rybikov	13	0	13	0	0	0
2	DF	(Armenia) ARM	Yuri Martirosyan	29	1	24+5	1	0	0
3	MF	(Russia) RUS	Matvey Guyganov	4	0	2+2	0	0	0
4	MF	(Russia) RUS	Mikhail Strelnik	37	3	29+6	3	2	0
5	DF	(Armenia) ARM	Edmon Movsisyan	12	3	11	3	1	0
6	MF	(Armenia) ARM	Vahram Makhsudyan	13	0	4+8	0	0+1	0
7	DF	(Nigeria) NGR	Barry Isaac	14	1	14	1	0	0
8	MF	(Armenia) ARM	Sargis Shahinyan	4	0	1+3	0	0	0
9	MF	(Armenia) ARM	Aram Loretsyan	27	3	8+17	3	1+1	0
10	MF	(Ukraine) UKR	Vladyslav Khomutov	9	0	4+5	0	0	0
11	FW	(Russia) RUS	Zakhar Tarasenko	34	8	22+10	8	1+1	0
13	GK	(Armenia) ARM	Gor Manukyan	11	0	9+1	0	1	0
14	MF	(Nigeria) NGR	Julius David Ufuoma	33	2	31	2	1+1	0
15	DF	(Ivory Coast) CIV	Salia Kader Traore	2	0	2	0	0	0
16	DF	(Armenia) ARM	Robert Hakobyan	13	0	10+3	0	0	0
19	FW	(Armenia) ARM	Sargis Metoyan	35	6	31+3	6	1	0
21	MF	(Armenia) ARM	Spartak Hayrapetyan	6	0	3+3	0	0	0
22	DF	(Italy) ITA	Stefano Crivellaro	13	1	10+3	1	0	0
24	DF	(Armenia) ARM	Hayk Sargsyan	15	0	7+7	0	1	0
26	DF	(Armenia) ARM	Arman Khachatryan	28	1	23+4	0	1	1
30	FW	(Mali) MLI	Hadji Dramé	14	1	9+5	1	0	0
31	MF	(Ivory Coast) CIV	Adama Samake	9	0	2+7	0	0	0
35	FW	(Nigeria) NGR	Taofiq Jibril	3	0	0+3	0	0	0
36	FW	(Nigeria) NGR	Chidera Oparaocha	13	4	1+12	4	0	0
37	MF	(Nigeria) NGR	Sunday Kalu	4	0	2+2	0	0	0
87	DF	(Russia) RUS	Aleksey Kayukov	4	0	2+2	0	0	0
94	DF	(Nigeria) NGR	Chukwuebuka Okoronkwo	10	0	10	0	0	0
Players away on loan:
Players who left West Armenia during the season:
1	GK	(Armenia) ARM	Khachatur Manukyan	1	0	1	0	0	0
3	DF	(Armenia) ARM	Gagik Daghbashyan	8	0	6	0	2	0
7	FW	(Brazil) BRA	Léo Pará	4	0	0+3	0	1	0
8	DF	(Russia) RUS	Zalim Makoev	15	0	8+5	0	1+1	0
10	FW	(Armenia) ARM	Artyom Gevorkyan	17	2	12+4	2	0+1	0
16	FW	(Tanzania) TAN	Edson Eric Mwijage	15	1	5+8	0	1+1	1
22	MF	(Russia) RUS	Dato Cherkoev	2	0	0+2	0	0	0
23	DF	(Brazil) BRA	Caxambu	12	0	10+1	0	1	0
31	DF	(Russia) RUS	Vladimir Kharatyan	17	0	13+2	0	2	0
33	MF	(Russia) RUS	Erik Karapetyan	11	0	1+9	0	1	0
38	GK	(Brazil) BRA	Filipe	15	0	13+1	0	1	0
69	DF	(Russia) RUS	Maks Dziov	20	2	19	2	0+1	0
88	MF	(Brazil) BRA	André Mensalão	19	4	16+1	4	1+1	0
99	FW	(Brazil) BRA	Eydison	18	2	8+8	2	1+1	0

=== Goal scorers ===
Place	Position	Nation	Number	Name	Premier League	Armenian Cup	Total
1	FW	(Russia)	11	Zakhar Tarasenko	8	0	8
2	FW	(Armenia)	19	Sargis Metoyan	6	0	6
3	MF	(Brazil)	88	André Mensalão	4	0	4
3	FW	(Nigeria)	36	Chidera Oparaocha	4	0	4
5	DF	(Armenia)	5	Edmon Movsisyan	3	0	3
5	MF	(Russia)	4	Mikhail Strelnik	3	0	3
5	MF	(Armenia)	9	Aram Loretsyan	3	0	3
8	FW	(Armenia)	10	Artyom Gevorkyan	2	0	2
8	DF	(Russia)	69	Maks Dziov	2	0	2
8	FW	(Brazil)	99	Eydison	2	0	2
8	MF	(Nigeria)	14	Julius David Ufuoma	2	0	2
12	DF	(Armenia)	2	Yuri Martirosyan	1	0	1
12	DF	(Italy)	22	Stefano Crivellaro	1	0	1
12	DF	(Nigeria)	7	Barry Isaac	1	0	1
12	FW	(Mali)	30	Hadji Dramé	1	0	1
12	FW	(Tanzania)	16	Edson Eric Mwijage	0	1	1
12	DF	(Armenia)	26	Arman Khachatryan	0	1	1
				TOTALS	43	2	45

=== Clean sheets ===
Place	Position	Nation	Number	Name	Premier League	Armenian Cup	Total
1	GK	(Brazil)	38	Filipe	4	0	4
1	GK	(Russia)	1	Nikolai Rybikov	4	0	4
3	GK	(Armenia)	13	Gor Manukyan	0	1	1
				TOTALS	8	1	9

=== Disciplinary record ===
Number	Nation	Position	Name	Premier League		Armenian Cup		Total	
Number	Nation	Position	Name	Booked	Sent off (straight red)	Booked	Sent off (straight red)	Booked	Sent off (straight red)
1	(Russia)	GK	Nikolai Rybikov	2	0	0	0	2	0
2	(Armenia)	DF	Yuri Martirosyan	2	0	0	0	2	0
3	(Russia)	MF	Matvey Guyganov	1	0	0	0	1	0
4	(Russia)	MF	Mikhail Strelnik	8	0	0	0	8	0
5	(Armenia)	DF	Edmon Movsisyan	6	2	0	1	6	3
6	(Armenia)	MF	Vahram Makhsudyan	3	0	0	0	3	0
7	(Nigeria)	DF	Barry Isaac	2	0	0	0	2	0
8	(Armenia)	MF	Sargis Shahinyan	1	0	0	0	1	0
9	(Armenia)	MF	Aram Loretsyan	1	0	0	0	1	0
10	(Ukraine)	MF	Vladyslav Khomutov	1	0	0	0	1	0
11	(Russia)	FW	Zakhar Tarasenko	5	0	0	0	5	0
13	(Armenia)	GK	Gor Manukyan	0	0	1	0	1	0
14	(Nigeria)	MF	Julius David Ufuoma	9	0	0	0	9	0
16	(Armenia)	DF	Robert Hakobyan	3	0	0	0	3	0
19	(Armenia)	FW	Sargis Metoyan	3	0	0	0	3	0
22	(Italy)	DF	Stefano Crivellaro	2	0	0	0	2	0
24	(Armenia)	DF	Hayk Sargsyan	4	0	0	0	4	0
26	(Armenia)	DF	Arman Khachatryan	5	0	0	0	5	0
30	(Mali)	FW	Hadji Dramé	2	0	0	0	2	0
36	(Nigeria)	FW	Chidera Oparaocha	1	0	0	0	1	0
87	(Russia)	DF	Aleksey Kayukov	1	0	0	0	1	0
94	(Nigeria)	DF	Chukwuebuka Okoronkwo	2	0	0	0	2	0
Players away on loan:
Players who left West Armenia during the season:
7	(Brazil)	FW	Léo Pará	0	0	1	0	1	0
8	(Russia)	DF	Zalim Makoev	2	1	0	0	2	1
10	(Armenia)	FW	Artyom Gevorkyan	3	0	0	0	3	0
16	(Tanzania)	FW	Edson Eric Mwijage	2	0	0	0	2	0
23	(Brazil)	DF	Caxambu	3	0	0	0	3	0
31	(Russia)	DF	Vladimir Kharatyan	5	0	0	0	5	0
33	(Russia)	MF	Erik Karapetyan	2	0	0	0	2	0
38	(Brazil)	GK	Filipe	3	0	0	0	3	0
69	(Russia)	DF	Maks Dziov	5	0	0	0	5	0
88	(Brazil)	MF	André Mensalão	2	0	0	0	2	0
99	(Brazil)	FW	Eydison	1	0	0	0	1	0
			TOTALS	91	3	2	1	93	4
