= Gauchinho =

Brazilian footballer (born 1976)

Personal information
- Full name: Paulo Roberto Junges
- Date of birth: 7 May 1976 (age 50)
- Place of birth: Selbach, Rio Grande do Sul, Brazil
- Height: 1.79 m (5 ft 10 in)
- Position: Striker

Team information
- Current team: Monte Roraima (head coach)

Youth career
- 1991–1992: Internacional
- 1992–1996: Tuna Luso
- 1995: → São Paulo (loan)

Senior career*
Years	Team	Apps	(Gls)
1997	Paraná		
1997	Iraty		
1998	XV de Piracicaba		
1999	Cerro Porteño		
2000	Grêmio		
2001	Atlético Paranaense		
2001	Botafogo–SP		
2001	Goiás		
2001–2002	Avaí		
2002	Inter de Limeira		
2002	América de Natal		
2003	Cruz Azul		
2004	Guaraní		
2005	União Barbarense		
2006	Deportes Tolima		
2007–2008	Luverdense		
2009	Sinop		
2009	Mineiros		
2009	Treze		
2010	Inter de Santa Maria		
2010	Brasília		
2010	Luverdense		

Managerial career
- 2011: CRAC-MT
- 2011: Brasília
- 2011: CRAC-MT
- 2014: Paracatu
- 2014: Novo Horizonte
- 2016: Paracatu
- 2016: Brasília
- 2016–2017: Real FC
- 2018: Paracatu
- 2019: Ceilândia
- 2020: Real Brasília (assistant)
- 2026: Monte Roraima
- 2026–: Monte Roraima
- * Club domestic league appearances and goals

Paulo Roberto Junges (born 7 May 1976), commonly known as Gauchinho, is a Brazilian football coach and former player who played as a striker. He is the current head coach of Monte Roraima.

Gauchinho's best performance as a striker came in 1999 while playing for Cerro Porteño, as he was the top scorer for the 1999 Copa Libertadores with 6 goals and the Paraguayan 1st Division topscorer with 22 goals.

== Early life ==
The son of German descendants, he was born in the small town of Selbach located in the north of the state of Rio Grande do Sul, on 7 May 1976.

Gauchinho always had a passion for playing football. He spared no effort to achieve this dream. In 1991 at age 15, his dream of becoming a football player began to materialize. He qualified to play on the youth team of Sport Club Internacional of Porto Alegre, where he played for over a year. In 1992 he transferred to Tuna Luso in Belém, the capital of Pará, where he played on the youth teams until 1995, when he aroused the interest of some of Brazil's biggest clubs. He was loaned to São Paulo to participate in the Copa São Paulo de Juniores. The manager of the youth team, Darío Pereyra, had already formed the team, so Gauchinho didn't have an opportunity to play. He returned to his home club and signed his first professional contract.

== Professional career ==
Gauchinho started playing professionally at age 20 when he still belonged to a youth team, in the 1996 Campeonato Brasileiro Série B, defending Tuna Luso in 3 games and scoring 5 goals. In 1997, businessman Sergio Malucelli Luiz negotiated a contract to transfer him to Iraty Sport Club of Paraná. That year he played in the Paraná State League and was the highlight of the team. This success earned him a transfer to Paraná Clube to play in the 1997 Campeonato Brasileiro Série A. Playing at Paraná Club, he scored 12 goals, almost half of the 30 goals scored by the team that season. In 1998 he transferred to XV November in Piracicaba in the State of São Paulo. There he played in the 1998 Campeonato Brasileiro Série B, and was the greatest striker of the season with 16 goals. In 1999 Gauchinho participated in an international championship, playing for Cerro Porteño of Paraguay. He achieved great success in the 1999 Copa Libertadores, and was one of the highlights of the competition and the top scorer with 6 goals. That year he was also champion of the Clausura National Championship of Paraguay, and was the top scorer of that tournament with 14 goals. That same year, he was also the highest goalscorer in the Apertura Tournament with 12 goals. That year he also played in the Copa Mercosur scoring 1 goal.

In 2000 he made the biggest leap of his career, moving to Gremio, however he competed with Ronaldinho for a spot in the offense; not receiving any great opportunities, he ended up leaving. In 2001 he passed through four major Brazilian football clubs. Starting at Atlético-PR, after a few games he went to play in the Regional Championship of São Paulo State for Botafogo-SP, where he scored important and decisive goals that led the team to the final, which they lost to Corinthians Paulista. Next, he was transferred to Goiás EC to play in the 2001 Campeonato Brasileiro Série A. After the first round he was transferred to Avaí FC, where he made several great performances, scoring 12 goals and succeeding in the qualifying stage to lead his team to the semi-finals. In 2002, he played for Internacional de Limeira and América-RN.

In 2003 he ventured again into international football by playing for Cruz Azul in Mexico, yet after a good start he suffered a fractured cheekbone in a scrum, and required surgery that kept him out of action for months. After recovering, in 2004 he returned to Paraguay to the play in the national championship, this time playing for Club Guaraní. In 2005, he returned to Brazil to play for União Barbarense, playing in the 2005 Campeonato Brasileiro Série B. In 2006 went to Colombia and played in the national championship for Deportes Tolima. In 2007–08 he returned to Brazil to play for Luverdense of Lucas do Rio Verde, located in northern Mato Grosso. Within only two years he became the top scorer in the club's history with 44 goals in only 54 games, of which 9 goals were scored in the 2008 Campeonato Brasileiro Série C.

In 2009 he participated in the Mato Grosso Regional Championship, playing for Sinop FC, and was the highlight and top scorer of the team. He participated in only 8 games but was the third highest scorer of the competition with 6 goals, just 2 less than the top scorer. He played in 6 games of the 2009 Campeonato Brasileiro Série D, scoring 3 goals for Treze; however the team did not get the necessary points to qualify, finishing third in the group, and was eliminated.

== Awards ==
- Top scorer in the 1995 Paraná Junior Championship with 14 goals for Tuna Luso.
- Top scorer in the 1998 Brazilian Championship – Series B with 16 goals for XV November.
- Top scorer in the 1999 Paraguay national championship – Apertura with 14 goals for Cerro Porteño.
- Top scorer in the 1999 Paraguay national championship – Clausura with 16 goals for Cerro Porteño.
- Top scorer in the 1999 Copa Libertadores with 6 goals for Cerro Porteño.
