= Maks Dziov =

Russian footballer

Personal information
- Full name: Maks Ruslanovich Dziov
- Date of birth: 9 August 2001 (age 25)
- Place of birth: Vladikavkaz, Russia
- Height: 1.87 m (6 ft 2 in)
- Position: Centre-back

Team information
- Current team: Volga Ulyanovsk (on loan from Fakel Voronezh)

Youth career
- Spartak Vladikavkaz
- –2018: Konoplyov football academy
- 2018–2019: Lokomotiv Moscow
- 2019: Sochi

Senior career*
Years	Team	Apps	(Gls)
2019–2021	Spartak Vladikavkaz	2	(0)
2021	Mashuk-KMV Pyatigorsk	12	(1)
2021–2022	Yessentuki	14	(0)
2022	Dynamo Stavropol	11	(0)
2022–2024	West Armenia	43	(2)
2024	Dynamo Brest	13	(0)
2024–	Fakel Voronezh	21	(0)
2026	→ Dynamo Brest (loan)	7	(0)
2026–	→ Volga Ulyanovsk (loan)	0	(0)
- * Club domestic league appearances and goals as of 8 June 2026

Maks Ruslanovich Dziov (Russian: Макс Русланович Дзиов; born 9 August 2001) is a Russian football player who plays as a centre-back for Volga Ulyanovsk on loan from Fakel Voronezh.

== Career ==
On 26 June 2024, Dziov agreed to join Russian Premier League club Fakel Voronezh.

He made his RPL debut for Fakel on 4 August 2024 in a game against Krasnodar.

== Career statistics ==
As of match played 27 April 2025

Appearances and goals by club, season and competition
Club	Season	League			Cup		Europe		Other		Total	
Club	Season	Division	Apps	Goals	Apps	Goals	Apps	Goals	Apps	Goals	Apps	Goals
Spartak Vladikavkaz	2019–20	Russian Second League	2	0	—		—		—		2	0
Mashuk-KMV Pyatigorsk	2020–21	Russian Second League	13	1	0	0	—		—		13	1
Yessentuki	2021–22	Russian Second League	14	0	1	0	—		—		15	0
Dynamo Stavropol	2021–22	Russian Second League	11	0	—		—		—		11	0
West Armenia	2022–23	Armenian First League	0	0	1	0	—		—		1	0
West Armenia	2023–24	Armenian Premier League	19	2	1	0	—		—		20	2
West Armenia	Total		19	2	2	0	—		—		21	2
Dynamo Brest	2024	Belarusian Premier League	13	0	0	0	0	0	0	0	13	0
Fakel Voronezh	2024–25	Russian Premier League	21	0	2	0	—		—		23	0
Career total			93	3	5	0	0	0	0	0	98	3
