= Eydison =

Brazilian footballer (born 1988)

Personal information
- Full name: Eydison Teofilo Soares
- Date of birth: 30 May 1988 (age 38)
- Place of birth: Capinopolis, Brazil
- Height: 1.78 m (5 ft 10 in)
- Position: Forward

Team information
- Current team: Monte Roraima Futebol Clube

Youth career
- 2004–2006: Adap-PR
- 2007: Palmeiras

Senior career*
Years	Team	Apps	(Gls)
2007	Adap Galo Maringá		
2008	Engenheiro Beltrão		
2009	Portuguesa Santista		
2009	Grêmio Barueri		
2010–2011	Iraty	24	(4)
2011	Americano		
2012	Treze		
2012	Matsumoto Yamaga FC	8	(0)
2013	Cianorte	17	(1)
2013	Brusque		(16)
2013	Necaxa		
2013	São Miguel		
2014	Brusque	18	(2)
2014	Maringá	7	(4)
2014	Caxias		
2014	Caçador Atlético Clube		
2014	Inter de Lages	12	(1)
2015	Luverdense	5	(2)
2015–2016	Brusque	28	(9)
2016–2017	SHB Da Nang	30	(10)
2017	Long An	10	(2)
2018–2019	Than Quang Ninh	22	(15)
2019	Al-Orobah	14	(8)
2019	Kalteng Putra	14	(3)
2020	Al Dhaid	4	(0)
2020	Azuriz	13	(5)
2021	Than Quang Ninh	12	(6)
2022	Becamex Binh Duong	24	(5)
2023	Azuriz	9	(1)
2023	→ Alagoinhas Atlético (loan)	3	(0)
2023	West Armenia	18	(2)
2024	Bangkok	13	(6)
2025	Barcelona (BA)	6	(0)
2025	Monte Roraima Futebol Clube	2	(0)
2025	Patriotas	7	(1)
2025	Carlos Renaux	1	(1)
2025–	Monte Roraima Futebol Clube	0	(0)
- * Club domestic league appearances and goals as of 27 December 2023

Eydison Teofilo Soares, or simply Eydison (born 30 May 1988), is a Brazilian professional footballer who plays as a forward for Monte Roraima Futebol Clube.

== Early life ==
Eydison was born in Capinopolis, Brazil in 1988. He began his football career as a youth player with Associação Desportiva Atlética do Paraná, and has subsequently played for multiple senior teams in Brazil, Japan, Saudi Arabia, United Arab Emirates, Indonesia, Vietnam, Armenia and Thailand. He is a left-footed player, and usually plays as a forward or centre-forward.

== Career ==
=== Azuriz ===
On 20 September 2020, Eydison joined Azuriz for a season in Segunda Divisão. On 27 September 2020, he made his Azuriz debut, scoring one goal in a 1–1 draw with Prudentópolis. On 11 October, he made the first assist for Azuriz in a 1–0 home victory over Apucarana. On 18 October, he scored his second goal for the club, with a penalty in 1–1 draw against São-Joseense. On 27 October, he scored his 3rd goal for Azuriz, a header, to open a 2–1 home win against Nacional (PR). On 16 November, he scored his 4th goal for the club with a close-range shot in the 1–3 defeat to Maringá. On 25 November, he scored the opening penalty of the semi-final against Apucarana; Azuriz advanced to the final with an 8–7 victory on penalties. On 2 December at the Estádio Willie Davids of Maringá, he scored the first goal in an 3–0 away victory, meaning that his club Azuriz became champions of Paranaense 2 for 2020. Azuriz and Maringá were promoted to Primeira Divisão 2021.

On 14 January 2023, Eydison returned to Azuriz after two years in the Vietnam. On 13 February, he scored his first goal of the season in a 2–0 home victory over Foz do Iguaçu, this was also the first club win of the season.

=== Than Quang Ninh ===
On 23 December 2020, Eydison returned to Than Quang Ninh in the 2021 V-league 1, this was his second time with Than Quang Ninh FC. On 17 January 2021, he scored 2 goals for in the first round of 2021 V.League 1, in a 2–1 away win over Hong Linh Ha Tinh FC. On 24 March, he scored the last goal of a 2–0 home victory against Thanh Hoa FC. On 28 March, he scored 2 goals in the northeast Vietnam derby against Hải Phòng FC at Lach Tray Stadium. On 16 April, at Hang Day Stadium, he scored his 6th goal for the season in 2–1 away loss against Viettel FC.

=== Becamex Binh Duong ===
In January 2022, Eydison joined Becamex Binh Duong for a season in 2022 V-league 1. On 30 July, he scored his first goal for the club from a penalty kick, but his team lost 2–3 at home against Binh Dinh FC. On 13 August, he scored one goal in a 2–1 home victory over Saigon FC. On 7 October, he scored one goal in a 4–0 away victory over SHB Da Nang FC - one of his old clubs. On 23 October, he scored his 4th goal for the club with another penalty, in a 2–2 draw at home against Hong Linh Ha Tinh FC. On 30 October, he scored a 5th goal, with a penalty as his team drew 1–1 in home to Nam Dinh FC.

=== Alagoinhas Atlético Clube ===
March 2023, Eydison joined Alagoinhas Atlético, on loan from Azuriz.

=== West Armenia ===
On 11 August 2023, West Armenia announced that Eydison had joined the club for a season. On 14 September, he scored his first goal for the club, West Armenia won the first game in the season after 2–0 home victory against FC Van. On 5 December, he had second goal, 1–2 victory away against Shirak SC. On 18 December 2023, West Armenia announced the departure of Eydison.

=== Bangkok FC ===
January 2024, Bangkok announced that Eydison had joined the club for a season. On 10 January, he scored his first goal for the club in 2–2 draw game against The iCon RSU FC. On 21 January, he had 2 goals for team in 5–1 away winning game against Inter Bangkok. On 31 January, he scored 1 goal in 4-0 winning home against Thai Army. On 4 February, Eydison scored 1 goal in 1-0 winning away against Kasem Bundit. On 28 February, he had 6th goal for club in 5-4 winning home against Buriram United in Third round of Thai FA Cup and reach to Quarter-finals.

=== Barcelona (BA) ===
January 2025, Barcelona (BA) announced that Eydison had joined the club for a season. But in March 2025, he left the club after 6 games.

=== Monte Roraima ===
March 2025, Monte Roraima Futebol Clube announced that Eydison had joined the club for a season. He left the club after 2 months.

=== Patriotas ===
May 2025, Patriotas Futebol Clube announced that Eydison had joined the club for a season. On 25 May, he scored his first goal for the club in 1-3 lose game against Galo Maringá.

=== Carlos Renaux ===
July 2025, Carlos Renaux announced that Eydison had joined the club for a season. On 28 July, he scored his first goal for the club in 2-0 winning game against Camboriú Futebol Clube.

=== Monte Roraima ===
December 2025, Monte Roraima Futebol Clube announced that Eydison came back the team for 2025–2026 season.

== Honours ==
Inter de Lages

- Campeonato Catarinense Série B: 2014

Brusque

- Campeonato Catarinense Série B: 2015

Azuriz Futebol Clube

- Campeonato Paranaense Série Prata: 2020

Bangkok

- Thai League 3: 2023–24
- Thai League 3 Bangkok Metropolitan Region: 2023–24
