= Zakhar Tarasenko =

Russian footballer

Personal information
- Full name: Zakhar Aleksandrovich Tarasenko
- Date of birth: 12 October 1997 (age 29)
- Place of birth: Ukhta, Russia
- Height: 1.85 m (6 ft 1 in)
- Position: Forward

Team information
- Current team: FC Veles Moscow
- Number: 8

Youth career
- Gatchinskaya DYuSSh Gatchina

Senior career*
Years	Team	Apps	(Gls)
2016–2018	FC Gatchina (amateur)		
2018–2019	FC Leningradets Leningrad Oblast	0	(0)
2019–2020	FC TSK-Tavria Simferopol	25	(8)
2020–2021	FC Sevastopol		
2021–2022	FC Olimp-Dolgoprudny	34	(6)
2022–2023	FC KAMAZ Naberezhnye Chelny	12	(0)
2023–2024	West Armenia	45	(15)
2025	Pelister	9	(2)
2025–	FC Veles Moscow	36	(8)
- * Club domestic league appearances and goals as of 13 June 2026

Zakhar Aleksandrovich Tarasenko (Russian: Захар Александрович Тарасенко; born 12 October 1997) is a Russian football player who plays for FC Veles Moscow.

== Club career ==
He made his debut in the Russian Football National League for FC Olimp-Dolgoprudny on 10 July 2021 in a game against FC Neftekhimik Nizhnekamsk.
