= Mikhail Strelnik =

Russian football player

Personal information
- Full name: Mikhail Mikhailovich Strelnik
- Date of birth: 27 May 2000 (age 26)
- Height: 1.81 m (5 ft 11 in)
- Position: Midfielder

Team information
- Current team: Volgar Astrakhan
- Number: 5

Youth career
- Strogino Moscow

Senior career*
Years	Team	Apps	(Gls)
2019–2020	Strogino Moscow	13	(0)
2020–2021	Krasnodar-3	25	(2)
2021	Krasnodar-2	6	(0)
2022	Olimp-Dolgoprudny	6	(0)
2022	Samgurali Tsqaltubo	8	(0)
2023	SKA Rostov-on-Don	11	(3)
2023–2024	West Armenia	35	(3)
2024	Telavi	5	(0)
2025	Kaluga	17	(1)
2025–	Volgar Astrakhan	44	(1)
- * Club domestic league appearances and goals as of 15 November 2026

Mikhail Mikhailovich Strelnik (Russian: Михаил Михайлович Стрельник; born 27 May 2000) is a Russian football player who plays for Volgar Astrakhan.

== Club career ==
He made his debut in the Russian Football National League for FC Krasnodar-2 on 31 July 2021 in a game against FC Olimp-Dolgoprudny.
