= Monte Roraima Futebol Clube =

Brazilian association football club based in Boa Vista, Roraima, Brazil

Monte Roraima
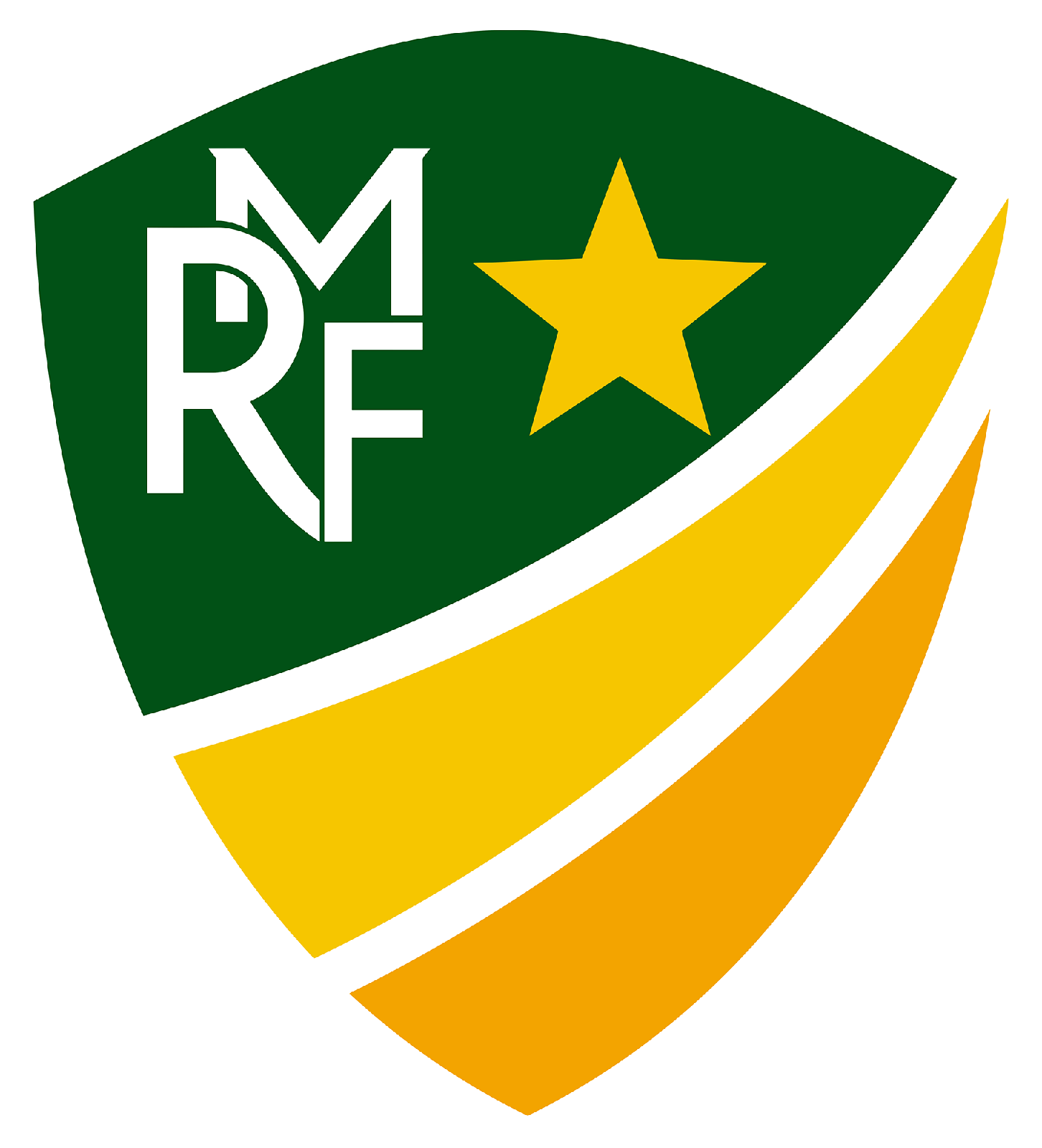
- Full name: Monte Roraima Futebol Clube
- Nicknames: Auriverde Macuxi (Macuxi Yellow and Green); Tamanduá (Anteater)
- Founded: 22 March 2023; 3 years ago
- Ground: Estádio Canarinho
- Capacity: 4,556
- League: Campeonato Brasileiro Série D Campeonato Roraimense
- 2025: Roraimense, 2nd of 8
Home colors	Away colors	Third colors

Monte Roraima Futebol Clube, commonly referred to as Monte Roraima, is a Brazilian professional club based in Boa Vista, Roraima founded on 22 March 2023. It competes in the Campeonato Roraimense, the top flight of the Roraima state football league.

== History ==
Founded in 2023, the club is named after Mount Roraima, a 2,810-metre-high tourist attraction located on the triple border between Brazil, Venezuela and Guyana. Its official colours are green, representing the Amazon region, and yellow, representing the gold and other mineral riches found in Roraima.

== Stadium ==
It plays its matches at Estádio Canarinho. The stadium has a capacity of 4,556 people.

== Honours ==
=== Runners-up ===
- Campeonato Roraimense (1): 2025
