= Matvey Guyganov =

Ukrainian footballer

Personal information
- Full name: Matvey Alexandrovich Guyganov
- Date of birth: 28 July 1994 (age 32)
- Place of birth: Sevastopol, Ukraine
- Height: 1.87 m (6 ft 2 in)
- Position: Defender

Team information
- Current team: West Armenia
- Number: 3

Youth career
- –2008: Shakhtar Donetsk
- Metalurh Donetsk
- Sevastopol
- 2013–2014: Sevastopol
- 2014–2015: Mordovia Saransk

Senior career*
Years	Team	Apps	(Gls)
2010–2013	Sevastopol-2	39+	(3+)
2015–2016	Sevastopol	34	(3)
2017	TSK-Tavriya	9	(2)
2017–2018	Urartu	20	(2)
2018	Sevastopol	12	(2)
2019	Ararat Yerevan	13	(0)
2019	Palanga	9	(0)
2020–2021	Speranța Nisporeni	15	(0)
2021	Dinamo Samarqand	0	(0)
2021–2024	Sevastopol	16	(1)
2024–	West Armenia	4	(0)
- * Club domestic league appearances and goals as of 1 June 2024

Matvey Alexandrovich Guyganov (Russian: Матвей Гуйганов; born 28 July 1994) is a Ukrainian-Russian footballer who plays as a defender for Armenian club West Armenia.

== Career ==
In 2017, Guyganov signed for Armenian side Urartu.

In 2018, he signed for Sevastopol (Russia) in Crimea.

In 2019, he signed for Lithuanian club Palanga.

In 2020, Guyganov signed for Speranța in Moldova.
