= Taofiq Jibril =

Nigerian footballer

Personal information
- Full name: Taofiq Jibril
- Date of birth: 23 April 1998 (age 28)
- Place of birth: Kaduna, Nigeria
- Height: 1.81 m (5 ft 11 in)
- Position: Forward

Team information
- Current team: Tochigi City FC

Youth career
- –2016: Royal Sporting Club
- 2016–2018: Vila Real

Senior career*
| Years | Team | Apps | (Gls) |
| 2018–2020 | Portimonense | 2 | (0) |
| 2018–2020 | → Valadares Gaia (loan) | 24 | (7) |
| 2020–2022 | Žilina | 43 | (5) |
| 2020–2021 | Žilina B | 16 | (9) |
| 2022 | → ViOn Zlaté Moravce (loan) | 13 | (2) |
| 2023 | Ararat-Armenia | 15 | (4) |
| 2023–2024 | Pyunik | 15 | (0) |
| 2024 | West Armenia | 3 | (0) |
| 2024 | MFK Skalica | 10 | (0) |
| 2025– | Tochigi City FC | 0 | (0) |
- * Club domestic league appearances and goals as of 25 January 2025, 10:00 (UTC)

Taofiq Jibril (born 23 April 1998) is a Nigerian professional footballer who plays as a forward for J2 League club, Tochigi City FC.

== Career ==
On 12 January 2023, Armenian Premier League club Ararat-Armenia announced the signing of Jibril. On 21 June 2023, Ararat-Armenia announced that Jibril had left the club after his contract was terminated by mutual agreement.

On 30 June 2023, Pyunik announced the signing of Jibril.

On 4 March 2024, West Armenia announced the signing of Jibril.

On 10 June 2024, MFK Skalica announced the signing of Jibril to a two-year contract from West Armenia.

On 25 January 2025, Jibril was announce official signing to J3 promoted club, Tochigi City FC for 2025 season.

== Career statistics ==
=== Club ===
As of match played 7 May 2024

Appearances and goals by club, season and competition
| Club | Season | League | | | National Cup | | League Cup | | Continental | | Other | | Total | |
| Club | Season | Division | Apps | Goals | Apps | Goals | Apps | Goals | Apps | Goals | Apps | Goals | Apps | Goals |
|---|---|---|---|---|---|---|---|---|---|---|---|---|---|---|
| Portimonense | 2018–19 | Primeira Liga | 2 | 0 | 0 | 0 | 0 | 0 | – | | | | 2 | 0 |
| Portimonense | 2019–20 | Primeira Liga | 0 | 0 | 0 | 0 | 0 | 0 | – | | | | 0 | 0 |
| Portimonense | Total | | 2 | 0 | 0 | 0 | 0 | 0 | - | - | - | - | 2 | 0 |
| Valadares Gaia (loan) | 2019–20 | Campeonato de Portugal | 24 | 7 | 0 | 0 | – | | | | | | 24 | 7 |
| MŠK Žilina | 2020–21 | Slovak Super Liga | 16 | 4 | 2 | 0 | – | | | | | | 18 | 4 |
| MŠK Žilina | 2021–22 | Slovak Super Liga | 11 | 0 | 0 | 0 | – | | 8 (Note: Appearances and goals in the UEFA Europa Conference League) | 3 | – | | 19 | 3 |
| MŠK Žilina | 2022–23 | Slovak Super Liga | 15 | 1 | 1 | 1 | – | | | | | | 16 | 2 |
| MŠK Žilina | Total | | 42 | 5 | 3 | 1 | - | - | 8 | 3 | - | - | 53 | 9 |
| MŠK Žilina B | 2020–21 | 2. Liga | 11 | 9 | – | | | | | | | | 11 | 9 |
| MŠK Žilina B | 2021–22 | 2. Liga | 4 | 0 | – | | | | | | | | 4 | 0 |
| MŠK Žilina B | 2022–23 | 2. Liga | 1 | 0 | – | | | | | | | | 1 | 0 |
| MŠK Žilina B | Total | | 16 | 9 | - | - | - | - | - | - | - | - | 16 | 9 |
| ViOn Zlaté Moravce (loan) | 2021–22 | Slovak Super Liga | 13 | 2 | 2 | 0 | – | | | | | | 15 | 2 |
| Ararat-Armenia | 2022–23 | Armenian Premier League | 15 | 4 | 0 | 0 | – | | 0 | 0 | – | | 15 | 4 |
| Pyunik | 2023–24 | Armenian Premier League | 15 | 0 | 0 | 0 | – | | 3 | 0 | – | | 18 | 0 |
| West Armenia | 2023–24 | Armenian Premier League | 3 | 0 | 0 | 0 | – | | – | | – | | 3 | 0 |
| Career total | | | 130 | 27 | 5 | 1 | 0 | 0 | 11 | 3 | - | - | 146 | 31 |
