= Filipe (footballer, born 1998) =

Brazilian footballer

Personal information
- Full name: Filipe Gonçalves dos Santos
- Date of birth: 31 January 1998 (age 28)
- Place of birth: Rio de Janeiro, Brazil
- Height: 1.93 m (6 ft 4 in)
- Position: Goalkeeper

Team information
- Current team: Marcílio Dias
- Number: 38

Youth career
- –2021: Corinthians

Senior career*
Years	Team	Apps	(Gls)
2020–2021	Corinthians	0	(0)
2020	→ Paraná (loan)	5	(0)
2023	Maringá	0	(0)
2023	West Armenia	14	(0)
2024–	Marcílio Dias	5	(0)
- * Club domestic league appearances and goals as of 25 February 2024

Filipe Gonçalves dos Santos (born 31 January 1998), commonly known as Filipe, is a Brazilian footballer who plays for Brazilian side Marcílio Dias as a goalkeeper.

== Career statistics ==
=== Club ===
As of 7 June 2020.

Club	Season	League			State league		Cup		Continental		Other		Total	
Club	Season	Division	Apps	Goals	Apps	Goals	Apps	Goals	Apps	Goals	Apps	Goals	Apps	Goals
Corinthians B	2019	–			0	0	0	0	0	0	8 (Note: Appearances in the Copa Paulista)	0	8	0
Corinthians	2020	Série A	0	0	0	0	0	0	0	0	0	0	0	0
Paraná (loan)	2020	Série B	0	0	1 (Note: Appearances in the Campeonato Paranaense)	0	0	0	0	0	0	0	1	0
Career total			0	0	1	0	0	0	0	0	8	0	9	0
