= 2024–25 FC Ararat-Armenia season =

Ararat-Armenia
2024-25 season
- Chairman: Rafik Hayrapetyan
- Manager: Vardan Minasyan
- Stadium: Republican Stadium
- Premier League: 2nd
- Armenian Cup: Runners Up
- Armenian Supercup: Champions
- UEFA Conference League: Third qualifying round
- Top goalscorer: League: Marius Noubissi (18); All: Marius Noubissi (22)
Home colours	Away colours

The 2024–25 season was FC Ararat-Armenia's 7th season in Armenian Premier League.

== Season overview ==
On 18 August, Ararat-Armenia announced the signing of Eric Ocansey from Lierse Kempenzonen.

On 30 June, Ararat-Armenia announced the signing of Hovhannes Harutyunyan on loan from Sochi.

On 3 July, Ararat-Armenia announced the signing of João Queirós from Mafra.

On 18 July, Ararat-Armenia announced the signing of Aleksandr Pavlovets from Orenburg, and Danylo Kucher from UTA Arad.

On 18 August, Ararat-Armenia announced the signing of Marius Noubissi from Patro Eisden.

On 13 January, Ararat-Armenia announced the signing of Henri Avagyan from Pyunik and the departure of Arsen Beglaryan after his contract expired.

On 14 January, Ararat-Armenia announced that Artur Serobyan had joined Sheriff Tiraspol on loan and that Romércio had returned to the club having previously played for the club during the 2021–22 and 2022–23 seasons.

On 15 January, Ararat-Armenia announced that Alexis Rodríguez had left the club after his contract was terminated by mutual agreement.

== Squad ==
As of match played 28 May 2025

Number	Name	Nationality	Position	Date of birth (age)	Signed from	Signed in	Contract ends	Apps.	Goals
Goalkeepers
1	Rafael Manasyan	(Armenia)	GK	22 May 2003 (aged 22)	Academy	2021		0	0
31	Danylo Kucher	(Ukraine)	GK	25 January 1997 (aged 28)	UTA Arad	2024		15	0
96	Henri Avagyan	(Armenia)	GK	16 January 1996 (aged 29)	Pyunik	2025		16	0
Defenders
3	Junior Bueno	(Colombia)	DF	3 September 1996 (aged 28)	Once Caldas	2021		125	3
4	João Queirós	(Portugal)	DF	22 April 1998 (aged 27)	Mafra	2024		36	1
13	Kamo Hovhannisyan	(Armenia)	DF	5 October 1992 (aged 32)	Unattached	2024		50	1
16	Edgar Grigoryan	(Armenia)	DF	25 August 1998 (aged 26)	Unattached	2023		80	0
25	Aleksandr Pavlovets	(Belarus)	DF	13 August 1996 (aged 28)	Orenburg	2024		14	0
34	Romércio	(Brazil)	DF	25 February 1997 (aged 28)	Botafogo-SP	2025		36	3
Midfielders
5	Hakob Hakobyan	(Armenia)	MF	29 March 1997 (aged 28)	Urartu	2022		50	2
7	Zhirayr Shaghoyan	(Armenia)	MF	10 April 2001 (aged 24)	Academy	2017		98	20
8	Hovhannes Harutyunyan	(Armenia)	MF	25 May 1999 (aged 26)	on loan from Sochi	2024		61	9
10	Armen Ambartsumyan	(Russia)	MF	11 April 1994 (aged 31)	Fakel Voronezh	2018		219	15
11	Jonathan Duarte	(Colombia)	MF	25 May 1997 (aged 28)	Orsomarso	2022		94	17
12	Amos Nondi	(Kenya)	MF	10 February 1999 (aged 26)	Dila Gori	2023		77	1
19	Karen Muradyan	(Armenia)	MF	11 November 1992 (aged 32)	Ararat Yerevan	2021		143	1
20	Alwyn Tera	(Kenya)	MF	18 January 1997 (aged 28)	Saburtalo Tbilisi	2021		134	9
21	Narek Alaverdyan	(Armenia)	MF	19 February 2002 (aged 23)	Youth Team	2019		12	0
Forwards
15	Tenton Yenne	(Nigeria)	FW	7 July 2000 (aged 24)	Noravank	2022		114	47
17	Matthew Gbomadu	(Nigeria)	FW	16 October 2004 (aged 20)	FDC Vista	2023		52	8
33	Eric Ocansey	(Ghana)	FW	22 August 1997 (aged 27)	Lierse Kempenzonen	2024		35	6
45	Marius Noubissi	(Cameroon)	FW	28 November 1996 (aged 28)	Patro Eisden	2024		32	22
Away on loan
9	Artur Serobyan	(Armenia)	FW	2 July 2003 (aged 21)	Academy	2020		74	18
27	Davit Petrosyan	(Armenia)	MF	2 March 2005 (aged 20)	Academy	2022		0	0
28	Davit Barseghyan	(Armenia)	MF	3 January 2005 (aged 20)	Unattached	2024		0	0
	Hayk Khachatryan	(Armenia)	GK	27 January 2005 (aged 20)	Academy	2021		0	0
	Michel Ayvazyan	(Armenia)	MF	21 June 2005 (aged 19)	Academy	2022		12	1
	Misak Hakobyan	(Armenia)	FW	11 June 2004 (aged 20)	Academy	2021		0	0
Left during the season
7	Alexis Rodríguez	(Argentina)	MF	21 March 1996 (aged 29)	Unattached	2024		35	9
24	Arsen Beglaryan	(Armenia)	GK	18 February 1993 (aged 32)	Urartu	2023		33	0
34	Erik Smbatyan	(Armenia)	MF	10 February 2003 (aged 22)	Academy	2022		1	0

== Transfers ==
=== In ===
Date	Position	Nationality	Name	From	Fee	Ref.
20 June 2024	FW	(Ghana)	Eric Ocansey	Lierse Kempenzonen	Undisclosed	
3 July 2024	DF	(Portugal)	João Queirós	Mafra	Undisclosed	
18 July 2024	DF	(Belarus)	Aleksandr Pavlovets	Orenburg	Undisclosed	
18 July 2024	GK	(Ukraine)	Danylo Kucher	UTA Arad	Undisclosed	
18 August 2024	FW	(Cameroon)	Marius Noubissi	Patro Eisden	Undisclosed	
13 January 2025	GK	(Armenia)	Henri Avagyan	Pyunik	Undisclosed	
14 January 2025	DF	(Brazil)	Romércio	Botafogo-SP	Undisclosed	

=== Loans in ===
Date from	Position	Nationality	Name	To	Date to	Ref.
30 June 2024	MF	(Armenia)	Hovhannes Harutyunyan	Sochi	End of season	

=== Loans out ===
Date from	Position	Nationality	Name	To	Date to	Ref.
14 July 2024	MF	(Armenia)	Zhirayr Shaghoyan	Debreceni	10 January 2025	
12 September 2024	MF	(Armenia)	Michel Ayvazyan	BKMA Yerevan	End of season	
14 January 2025	FW	(Armenia)	Artur Serobyan	Sheriff Tiraspol	End of season	
20 February 2025	MF	(Armenia)	Davit Petrosyan	West Armenia	End of season	
20 February 2025	MF	(Armenia)	Davit Barseghyan	Gandzasar Kapan	End of season	

=== Released ===
Date	Position	Nationality	Name	Joined	Date	Ref
1 June 2024	DF	(Brazil)	Alemão	Pyunik	7 July 2024	
2 June 2024	DF	(Armenia)	Davit Terteryan	Van	2 July 2024	
2 June 2024	DF	(Brazil)	Léo Silva	Bhayangkara Presisi Indonesia	12 September 2024	
2 June 2024	MF	(Russia)	Nikolai Kipiani	Telavi	2 August 2024	
2 June 2024	FW	(Portugal)	Adriano Castanheira	Malut United		
3 June 2024	FW	(Armenia)	Artyom Avanesyan	Noah	18 June 2024	
3 June 2024	FW	(Guinea)	Mohamed Yattara	Al Dhafra		
14 June 2024	DF	(Brazil)	Cássio Scheid	Malut United		
26 June 2024	GK	(North Macedonia)	Damjan Shishkovski	Borac Banja Luka	28 June 2024	
30 June 2024	MF	(Armenia)	Wbeymar	Malut United		
30 June 2024	FW	(Brazil)	Agdon Menezes	Pyunik	7 July 2024	
13 January 2025	GK	(Armenia)	Arsen Beglaryan	Van	13 January 2025	
15 January 2025	FW	(Argentina)	Alexis Rodríguez	Deportivo Cuenca	12 February 2025	

== Friendlies ==
22 January 2025	Gandzasar Kapan	3–4	Ararat-Armenia
(UTC+4)	Goal	Report	Noubissi; Ocansey; Yenne (pen.); Ambartsumyan

28 January 2025	Spartacos Kitio	1–1	Ararat-Armenia	Dromolaxia, Cyprus
13:00 (UTC+4)	Goal	Report	Ocansey

28 January 2025	Achyronas-Onisilos	3–3	Ararat-Armenia	Liopetri, Cyprus
19:30 (UTC+4)	Goal	Report	Shaghoyan; Duarte; Pavlovets

2 February 2025	Ayia Napa	0–6	Ararat-Armenia	Ayia Napa, Cyprus
12:30 (UTC+4)		Report	Yenne; Ocansey; Gbomadu	Stadium: Georgios Katsouris Castros Stadium

8 February 2025	Kauno Žalgiris	2–1	Ararat-Armenia	Cyprus
11:30 (UTC+4)	Černych 22'; Jansonas 53'	Report	75'

8 February 2025	Ararat-Armenia	3–4	Lyngby	Cyprus
17:30 (UTC+4)	9'; 75'; 82'	Report	35'; 63'; 77'; 87'

11 February 2025	Ararat-Armenia	0–0	Ethnikos Achna	Ayia Napa, Cyprus
13:00 (UTC+4)		Report

14 February 2025	Hobro	0–2	Ararat-Armenia	Ayia Napa, Cyprus
13:00 (UTC+4)		Report	Duarte 25', 44'

22 March 2025	Ararat-Armenia	0–1	Alashkert	Yerevan
12:00 (UTC+4)		Report	Goal	Stadium: Yerevan Football Academy Stadium

== Competitions ==
=== Overview ===
Competition	First match	Last match	Starting round	Final position	Record							
Competition	First match	Last match	Starting round	Final position	Pld	W	D	L	GF	GA	GD	Win %
Premier League	4 August 2024	28 May 2025	Matchday 1	2nd	30	21	3	6	75	28	+47	70.00
Armenian Cup	5 March 2025	13 May 2025	Quarter-finals	Runnersup	5	3	0	2	6	6	+0	60.00
Armenian Supercup	9 April 2025	9 April 2025	Final	Winners	1	1	0	0	4	0	+4	100.00
UEFA Conference League	25 July 2024	15 August 2024	Second qualifying round	Third qualifying round	4	2	1	1	9	5	+4	50.00
Total					40	27	4	9	94	39	+55	67.50

Last updated: 28 May 2025
Source: Competitions

=== Armenian Supercup ===
9 April 2025	Pyunik	0–4	Ararat-Armenia	Yerevan
19:00 (UTC+4)	Haroyan (yellow card) 15'; Udo (yellow card) 60'; Bratkov (yellow card) 72'; Dzhikiya (yellow card) 75'; Kovalenko (yellow card) 90+4'	Report	Noubissi 3', 77'; Yenne 8'; Bratkov 40' (o.g.)	Stadium: Republican Stadium; Referee: Hovhannes Kalantaryan
Note: Match postponed on 20 February 2025 due to bad weather conditions. Match rearranged on 21 March 2025, for 9 April 2025.

=== Premier League ===
==== Results summary ====
Overall								Home						Away					
Pld	W	D	L	GF	GA	GD	Pts	W	D	L	GF	GA	GD	W	D	L	GF	GA	GD
28	19	3	6	69	28	+41	60	9	1	3	36	13	+23	10	2	3	33	15	+18

Last updated: 24 May 2025.
Source: See Results

==== Results by round ====
Round	1	3	4	5	6	7	8	9	2	11	12	13	14	15	16	17	18	19	10	20	21	22	23	24	25	26	27	28	29	30	31	32	33
Ground	A	A	-	H	A	H	A	H	H	H	A	H	A	H	A	H	A	-	A	H	A	H	H	H	A	-	A	A	H	A	H	A	H
Result	W	L	P	W	W	W	W	W	L	W	W	L	W	W	D	W	D	P	L	W	W	D	W	W	W	P	W	W	W	W	W	L	W
Position	2	8	8	5	4	4	2	1	1	2	2	2	3	3	3	1	1	2	2	4	4	4	4	3	2	3	3	2	2	2	2	2	2

Updated to match(es) played on 28 May 2025. Source: See Results
A = Away; H = Home; W = Win; D = Draw; L = Loss; P = Bye

==== Results ====
4 August 2024 1	Van	0–2	Ararat-Armenia	Charentsavan
17:00 (UTC+4)	Okonkwo (yellow card) 82'; Akila (yellow card) 90+5'	Report	Duarte 32'; Pavlovets (yellow card) 34'; Rodríguez 68' (pen.)	Stadium: City Stadium; Referee: Henrik Nalbandian

19 August 2024 3	Urartu	3–1	Ararat-Armenia	Yerevan
19:00 (UTC+4)	Putsko 20'; Margaryan (yellow card) 29'; Ignatyev 59', 66'	Report	Noubissi 81'; Pavlovets (yellow card) 90'	Stadium: Urartu Stadium; Referee: Zaven Hovhannisyan

4	Bye
(UTC+4)

30 August 2024 5	Ararat-Armenia	3–1	Alashkert	Yerevan
19:00 (UTC+4)	Yenne 4'; Noubissi 21'; Muradyan (yellow card) 65'; Serobyan (yellow card) 76'; Tera 80'	Report	B.Hovhannisyan 14' (pen.)	Stadium: Yerevan Football Academy Stadium; Referee: Yura Mahtesyan

14 September 2024 6	Gandzasar Kapan	0–3	Ararat-Armenia	Yerevan
16:00 (UTC+4)	Shahinyan (penalty missed) 11'; Mani (penalty missed) 45+8'	Report	Rodríguez 16' (yellow card) 53'; Ambartsumyan 33'; Queirós (yellow card) 61'; Ocansey 64'	Stadium: Junior Sport Stadium; Referee: Sargis Khachatryan

19 September 2024 7	Ararat-Armenia	4–0	Shirak	Yerevan
18:00 (UTC+4)	Ambartsumyan 10'; Queirós 20'; Beglaryan (yellow card) 45'; Serobyan 66' (pen.); Noubissi (yellow card) 73' (yellow-red card) 77'; Gbomadu 86'	Report	Vidić (yellow card) 19'; Doh (yellow card) 45'	Stadium: Yerevan Football Academy Stadium; Referee: Vardan Manukyan

24 September 2024 8	West Armenia	1–2	Ararat-Armenia	Yerevan
17:00 (UTC+4)	Kocharyan (yellow card) 45+1'; Tarasenko 45+4' (pen.); Rudoselsky (yellow card) 90+15'; Ayunts (yellow card) 90+16'	Report	Duarte (yellow card) 27'; Ocansey 35'; Pavlovets (yellow card) 45+3'; Rodríguez (yellow card) 89'; Grigoryan (yellow card) 90+4'; Serobyan 90+13' (pen.); Queirós (yellow card) 90+15'; Kucher (yellow card) 90+15'	Stadium: Junior Sport Stadium; Referee: Yura Mahtesyan

29 September 2024 9	Ararat-Armenia	2–0	BKMA Yerevan	Yerevan
17:00 (UTC+4)	Tera 36' (yellow card) 80'; Serobyan (penalty missed) 45+2'; Yenne 67'	Report	Petrosyan (yellow card) 29'	Stadium: Yerevan Football Academy Stadium; Referee: Zaven Hovhannisyan

3 October 2024 2	Ararat-Armenia	1–3	Pyunik	Yerevan
18:00 (UTC+4)	Noubissi (yellow card) 28'; Yenne 37' (pen.) (yellow card) 61'; Nondi (red card) 41'	Report	Otubanjo 58' (pen.); Agdon 76'; Buhari 83'	Stadium: Yerevan Football Academy Stadium; Referee: Artem Gasparyan

18 October 2024 11	Ararat-Armenia	3–2	Ararat Yerevan	Yerevan
18:00 (UTC+4)	Noubissi 19' (pen.), 50', 90+9'; Muradyan (yellow card) 23'; Pavlovets (yellow card) 42'; Queirós (yellow card) 57'	Report	Galstyan 22'; Kante (yellow card) 53'; Kante 65' (pen.); Gomes (yellow card) 85'; Dombila (yellow card) 90+9'	Stadium: Yerevan Football Academy Stadium; Referee: Hovhannes Kalantaryan

22 October 2024 12	Shirak	0–3	Ararat-Armenia	Gyumri
19:00 (UTC+4)	Doh (yellow card) 14'; Misakyan (yellow card) 47'	Report	Harutyunyan (yellow card) 22'; Grigoryan (yellow card) 58'; Queirós (yellow card) 65'; Noubissi 74'; Yenne 80'; Gbomadu 90+2'	Stadium: City Stadium; Referee: Artak Vardanyan

28 October 2024 13	Ararat-Armenia	0–1	Noah	Yerevan
19:00 (UTC+4)	K.Muradyan (yellow card) 14'; Ambartsumyan (yellow card) 90+2'; Duarte (yellow card) 90+2'	Report	Ferreira 13'; Manvelyan (yellow card) 44'; Hambardzumyan (yellow card) 68'; Omar (yellow card) 88'; Pablo (yellow card) 90' (yellow-red card) 90'; S.Muradyan (yellow card) 90+1'	Stadium: Yerevan Football Academy Stadium; Referee: Henrik Nalbandian

2 November 2024 14	BKMA Yerevan	2–4	Ararat-Armenia	Yerevan
19:00 (UTC+4)	Eloyan 17'; M.Hakobyan 86'; Petrosyan (yellow card) 90+2'	Report	Yenne 22', 34'; Ambartsumyan 45+2', 52'; Ocansey (yellow card) 65'; Muradyan (yellow card) 90+2'	Stadium: Yerevan Football Academy Stadium; Referee: Ashot Harutyunyan

6 November 2024 15	Ararat-Armenia	3–0	West Armenia	Yerevan
17:00 (UTC+4)	Harutyunyan (yellow card) 29'; Gbomadu 37'; Yenne 75'; Rodríguez 81'	Report		Stadium: Yerevan Football Academy Stadium; Referee: Ashot Ghaltakhchyan

10 November 2024 16	Ararat Yerevan	0–0	Ararat-Armenia	Yerevan
15:00 (UTC+4)	Faye (yellow card) 63'; Malakyan (yellow card) 65'; Dombila (yellow card) 90+1'; Grigoryan (yellow card) 90+2'; Trémoulet (red card) 90+4'	Report	Yenne (yellow card) 73'; Queirós (yellow card) 90+2'	Stadium: Yerevan Football Academy Stadium; Referee: Yura Mahtesyan

21 November 2024 17	Ararat-Armenia	3–0	Gandzasar Kapan	Yerevan
18:00 (UTC+4)	Noubissi 5' (yellow card) 19'; Rodríguez 88'; Muradyan 90+3'	Report	Mani (yellow card) 62'; Faye (yellow card) 70'	Stadium: Yerevan Football Academy Stadium; Referee: Vardan Manukyan

27 November 2024 18	Alashkert	2–2	Ararat-Armenia	Abovyan
15:00 (UTC+4)	Metoyan 40', 86'; Katoh (yellow card) 41'	Report	Noubissi 53'; Yenne 89' (penalty missed) 90+	Stadium: City Stadium; Referee: Zaven Hovhannisyan

19	Bye
(UTC+4)

4 December 2024 10	Noah	2–1	Ararat-Armenia	Abovyan
18:00 (UTC+4)	Bueno 8' (o.g.); Ferreira (red card) 18'; Pinson (yellow card) 23'; Oulad Omar 45+10'; Sangaré (yellow card) 47'; Hambardzumyan (yellow card) 79'; Čančarević (yellow card) 90+1'	Report	Nondi (yellow card) 16'; Yenne 36'; Ocansey (yellow card) 42'; Bueno (yellow card) 50' (yellow-red card) 90+11'; Queirós (yellow card) 57'; Duarte (yellow card) 72'; Rodríguez (yellow card) 90'	Stadium: City Stadium; Referee: Henrik Nalbandian

25 25 February 2025 20	Ararat-Armenia	1–2	Urartu	Charentsavan
18:00 (UTC+4)	Muradyan (yellow card) 45'; Harutyunyan (yellow card) 51' (goal) 85'; Grigoryan (yellow card) 84'; Hovhannisyan (yellow card) 87'; Nondi (yellow card) 89'; Ambartsumyan (yellow card) 90+6'	Report	Michel 53' (pen.); Simonyan (yellow card) 57'; Kalukyan 64' (yellow card) 90+4'; Melkonyan (yellow card) 90+6'; Margaryan (yellow card) 90+7'; Putsko (yellow card) 90+8'	Stadium: City Stadium; Referee: Ashot Ghaltakhchyan

1 March 2025 21	Pyunik	1–2	Ararat-Armenia	Yerevan
19:00 (UTC+4)	Otubanjo 57' (pen.); Udo (yellow card) 80'; Alceus (yellow card) 90+2' (yellow-red card) 90+10'	Report	Ocansey 15'; Duarte (yellow card) 45+2'; Queirós (yellow card) 53'; Yenne 66'; Ambartsumyan (yellow card) 75'; Shaghoyan (yellow card) 90+9'	Stadium: Junior Sport Stadium; Referee: Henrik Nalbandian

10 March 2025 22	Ararat-Armenia	1–1	Van	Yerevan
18:00 (UTC+4)	Tera 9'; Queirós (yellow card) 36' (yellow-red card) 86'; Noubissi (yellow card) 52'; Nondi (yellow card) 88'	Report	Drammeh (yellow card) 53'; John (yellow card) 57'; Hakobyan (yellow card) 88' (goal) 90+5'; Terteryan (yellow card) 90+5'	Stadium: Yerevan Football Academy Stadium; Referee: Ashot Ghaltakhchyan

15 March 2025 23	Ararat-Armenia	3–0	Alashkert	Yerevan
16:00 (UTC+4)	Noubissi 33'; Bueno (yellow card) 37'; Yenne 40'; Muradyan (yellow card) 41'; Gbomadu 90+3'	Report	Katoh (yellow card) 66'; Mensah (yellow card) 88'	Stadium: Yerevan Football Academy Stadium; Referee: Ashot Harutyunyan

28 March 2025 24	Ararat-Armenia	3–2	Pyunik	Yerevan
19:00 (UTC+4)	Bueno (yellow card) 36'; Shaghoyan 43'; Ocansey 70'; Noubissi 90+3' (pen.) (yellow card) 90+4'	Report	Malakyan 20' (pen.); Vareika 27'; Voskanyan (yellow card) 33'; Haroyan (yellow card) 41'; Alceus (yellow card) 90'; Davidyan (yellow card) 90+4'; Kovalenko (yellow card) 90+9'	Stadium: Yerevan Football Academy Stadium; Referee: Vardan Manukyan

5 April 2025 25	Urartu	0–3	Ararat-Armenia	Yerevan
19:00 (UTC+4)	Mkrtchyan (yellow card) 33'; Santos (yellow card) 71'; Paliyenko (yellow card) 72'	Report	Noubissi 34' (pen.), 37', 76'; Muradyan (yellow card) 66'	Stadium: Urartu Stadium; Referee: Henrik Nalbandian

26	Bye
(UTC+4)

20 April 2025 27	Van	2–3	Ararat-Armenia	Charentsavan
16:00 (UTC+4)	Okonkwo 8'; Bationo 45+8'	Report	Duarte (yellow card) 12'; Noubissi 15'; Shaghoyan 45', 48'; Queirós (yellow card) 45+5'	Stadium: City Stadium; Referee: Ashot Ghaltakhchyan

25 April 2025 28	Gandzasar Kapan	0–4	Ararat-Armenia	Yerevan
16:00 (UTC+4)	Gyasi (yellow card) 78'	Report	Ambartsumyan 7'; Tera (yellow card) 33'; Yenne 87', 90+2'; Noubissi 90'	Stadium: Junior Sport Stadium; Referee: Tiran Yeritsyan

3 May 2025 29	Ararat-Armenia	5–1	Shirak	Yerevan
16:00 (UTC+4)	Yenne 23', 77'; Shaghoyan 30'; Gbomadu 60', 71'; Bueno (yellow card) 86'	Report	Doh 21' (yellow card) 38'	Stadium: Yerevan Football Academy Stadium; Referee: Artak Vardanyan

9 May 2025 30	West Armenia	0–3	Ararat-Armenia	Yerevan
16:00 (UTC+4)				Stadium: Junior Sport Stadium
Note: Match postponed on 9 May after West Armenia failed to show up. The match was awarded as a 3-0 technical defeat in favour of Ararat-Armenia on 15 May when West Armenia where disqualified from the league.

18 May 2025 31	Ararat-Armenia	4–0	BKMA Yerevan	Yerevan
15:00 (UTC+4)	Duarte 21', 52'; Shaghoyan 23'; Hakobyan (yellow card) 85'; Yenne 90+4'	Report	Petrosyan (yellow card) 45+1'; Tsarukyan (yellow card) 84'	Stadium: Yerevan Football Academy Stadium; Referee: Zaven Hovhannisyan

24 May 2025 32	Noah	2–0	Ararat-Armenia	Abovyan
19:00 (UTC+4)	Muradyan 26'; Pinson (yellow card) 42' (goal) 49'; Hambardzumyan (yellow card) 53'; Ferreira (yellow card) 64'; Sangaré (yellow card) 90+2'	Report	Queirós (yellow card) 36'; Yenne (yellow card) 55'	Stadium: City Stadium; Referee: Sargis Khachatryan

28 May 2025 33	Ararat-Armenia	6–0	Ararat Yerevan	Yerevan
19:00 (UTC+4)	Noubissi 29', 61', 79'; Harutyunyan 43'; Yenne 75'; Ambartsumyan 76'; Shaghoyan (yellow card) 88'	Report	Bah (yellow card) 39'; Toure (yellow card) 58'	Stadium: Yerevan Football Academy Stadium; Referee: Hovhannes Kalantaryan

==== League table ====
Pos	Team	Pld	W	D	L	GF	GA	GD	Pts	Qualification or relegation
1	Noah (C)	30	24	3	3	92	20	+72	75	Qualification for the Champions League first qualifying round
2	Ararat-Armenia	30	21	3	6	75	28	+47	66	Qualification for the Conference League second qualifying round (Note: The 2024–25 Armenian Cup winners qualified for the Conference League second qualifying round. Since the cup winners (Noah) qualified based on league position, the Conference League second round spot was passed to the second-placed team, and the second Conference League first round spot was passed to the fourth-placed team.)
3	Urartu	30	19	5	6	64	31	+33	62	Qualification for the Conference League first qualifying round
4	Pyunik	30	17	2	11	59	37	+22	53	Qualification for the Conference League first qualifying round
5	Van	30	15	7	8	56	36	+20	52	
6	BKMA	30	10	6	14	44	54	−10	36	
7	Shirak	30	10	5	15	30	50	−20	35	
8	Ararat Yerevan	30	9	5	16	36	59	−23	32	
9	Alashkert	30	6	8	16	24	52	−28	26	
10	West Armenia (Note: On 7 May 2025, it was announced that West Armenia were on the verge of expulsion after a no show against Ararat-Armenia. On 17 May 2025, they were officially expelled and all games were awarded 3–0 to their opponents.) (D, R)	30	7	2	21	22	78	−56	23	Relegation to the Armenian First League
11	Gandzasar Kapan	30	2	4	24	16	73	−57	10	Spared from relegation

Source: FFA
Rules for classification: 1) Points; 2) Head-to-head points; 3) Head-to-head goal difference; 4) Head-to-head goals scored; 5) Matches won; 6) Goal difference; 7) Less red cards; 8) Less yellow cards; 9) Fair-play ranking 10) Draw
(C) Champions; (D) Disqualified; (R) Relegated

=== Armenian Cup ===
5 March 2025 Quarter-final 1st leg	Urartu	0–1	Ararat-Armenia	Charentsavan
16:00 (UTC+4)	Piloyan (yellow card) 28'	Report	Grigoryan (yellow card) 14'; Ambartsumyan (yellow card) 30'; Yenne 48' (pen.); Queirós (yellow card) 66'; Shaghoyan (yellow card) 70'	Stadium: Charentsavan City Stadium; Referee: Hovhannes Kalantaryan

1 April 2025 Quarter-final 2nd leg	Ararat-Armenia	2–1 (3–1 agg.)	Urartu	Yerevan
19:00 (UTC+4)	Grigoryan (yellow card) 4'; Putsko 62' (o.g.); Duarte (yellow card) 90+2'; Tera 90+7'	Report	Polyarus (yellow card) 14'; Tikhy 42'; Santos (yellow card) 58'; Aghasaryan (yellow card) 90+6'	Stadium: Yerevan Football Academy Stadium; Referee: Yura Mahtesyan

15 April 2025 Semi-final 1st leg	Pyunik	0–2	Ararat-Armenia	Yerevan
18:30 (UTC+4)	Kovalenko (yellow card) 9'; Buhari (yellow card) 29' (red card) 34'	Report	Bueno (yellow card) 23'; Ocansey 52'; Muradyan (yellow card) 61'; Noubissi 81' (pen.)	Stadium: Vazgen Sargsyan Republican Stadium; Referee: Henrik Nalbandyan

29 April 2025 Semi-final 2nd leg	Ararat-Armenia	0–2 (a.e.t.) (2–2 agg.) (4–2 p)	Pyunik	Yerevan
18:30 (UTC+4)	Noubissi (yellow card) 120'	Report	Bratkov 41' (yellow card) 104'; Queirós 52' (o.g.); Davidyan (yellow card) 105'; Vakulenko (yellow card) 120'	Stadium: Yerevan Football Academy Stadium; Referee: Artem Gasparyan
	Penalties
	Noubissi (penalty scored); Harutyunyan (penalty scored); Shaghoyan (penalty scored); Bueno (penalty scored)		(penalty scored) Malakyan; (penalty missed) Voskanyan; (penalty scored) Udo; (penalty missed) Vakulenko

13 May 2025 Final	Noah	3–1	Ararat-Armenia	Yerevan
19:00 (UTC+4)	Pinson (yellow card) 37'; Ferreira 40', 57'; Aiás 87'; Eteki (yellow card) 88'; Čančarević (yellow card) 90+4'	Report	Tera (yellow card) 12'; Bueno (yellow card) 37' (yellow-red card) 90+6'; Noubissi 44'	Stadium: Vazgen Sargsyan Republican Stadium; Referee: Ashot Harutyunyan

=== UEFA Conference League ===
==== Qualifying rounds ====
25 July 2024 Second qualifying round 1st leg	Zimbru Chișinău (Moldova)	0–3	Ararat-Armenia	Chişinău, Moldova
20:45 (UTC+4)	Guera (yellow card) 21'; Cojocari (yellow card) 39'; Samake (yellow card) 45+3'	Report	Serobyan 23' (pen.); Rodríguez (yellow card) 31'; Ocansey 74', 89'; Grigoryan (yellow card) 82'	Stadium: Zimbru Stadium; Attendance: 3,676; Referee: Fran Jović (Croatia)

1 August 2024 Second qualifying round 2nd leg	Ararat-Armenia	3–1 (6–1 agg.)	(Moldova) Zimbru Chișinău	Yerevan, Armenia
19:00 (UTC+4)	Nondi (yellow card) 6'; Yenne 28'; Harutyunyan (yellow card) 65'; Serobyan 68' (pen.); Duarte 88'	Report	Ohajunwa 62'; Alaribe (yellow card) 74'; Radu (yellow card) 76'	Stadium: Yerevan Football Academy Stadium; Attendance: 1,380; Referee: Aristotelis Diamantopoulos (Greece)

8 August 2024 Third qualifying round 1st leg	Ararat-Armenia	0–1	(Hungary) Puskás Akadémia	Yerevan, Armenia
19:00 (UTC+4)	Grigoryan (yellow card) 17'; Yenne (yellow card) 28'; Duarte (yellow card) 76'	Report	Szolnoki (yellow card) 16'; Ormonde-Ottewill (yellow card) 81'; Nagy (yellow card) 87'; Soisalo 89'	Stadium: Vazgen Sargsyan Republican Stadium; Attendance: 4,000; Referee: Kristoffer Hagenes (Norway)

15 August 2024 Third qualifying round 2nd leg	Puskás Akadémia (Hungary)	3–3 (4–3 agg.)	Ararat-Armenia	Felcsút, Hungary
23:00 (UTC+4)	Nagy 7', 47'; Szolnoki (yellow card) 62'; Komáromi (yellow card) 89'; Favorov 90+4' (yellow card) 90+5'	Report	Ambartsumyan (yellow card) 20'; Rodríguez (yellow card) 30'; Serobyan 39'; Harutyunyan 43'; Nondi (red card) 62'; Duarte 84' (yellow card) 87'	Stadium: Pancho Aréna; Attendance: 1,280; Referee: Genc Nuza (Kosovo)

== Squad statistics ==
As of match played 28 May 2025

=== Appearances and goals ===
No.	Pos	Nat	Player	Total		Premier League		Armenian Cup		Supercup		Conference League	
No.	Pos	Nat	Player	Apps	Goals	Apps	Goals	Apps	Goals	Apps	Goals	Apps	Goals
3	DF	(Colombia) COL	Junior Bueno	32	0	20+2	0	5	0	1	0	4	0
4	DF	(Portugal) POR	João Queirós	36	1	25+1	1	5	0	1	0	4	0
5	MF	(Armenia) ARM	Hakob Hakobyan	12	0	5+5	0	1	0	0+1	0	0	0
7	MF	(Armenia) ARM	Zhirayr Shaghoyan	18	5	8+4	5	3+2	0	0+1	0	0	0
8	MF	(Armenia) ARM	Hovhannes Harutyunyan	31	3	16+7	2	0+3	0	0+1	0	4	1
10	MF	(Russia) RUS	Armen Ambartsumyan	39	6	18+11	6	4+1	0	1	0	3+1	0
11	MF	(Colombia) COL	Jonathan Duarte	31	5	16+5	3	3+2	0	1	0	0+4	2
12	MF	(Kenya) KEN	Amos Nondi	28	0	15+6	0	1+2	0	0	0	4	0
13	DF	(Armenia) ARM	Kamo Hovhannisyan	33	0	21+2	0	5	0	1	0	4	0
15	FW	(Nigeria) NGA	Tenton Yenne	37	20	21+7	17	4	1	1	1	4	1
16	DF	(Armenia) ARM	Edgar Grigoryan	35	0	21+5	0	4	0	1	0	4	0
17	FW	(Nigeria) NGA	Matthew Gbomadu	35	6	2+24	6	1+4	0	0+1	0	0+3	0
19	MF	(Armenia) ARM	Karen Muradyan	38	1	24+5	1	4+1	0	1	0	0+3	0
20	MF	(Kenya) KEN	Alwyn Tera	34	4	12+13	3	2+2	1	0+1	0	1+3	0
21	MF	(Armenia) ARM	Narek Alaverdyan	7	0	1+5	0	0+1	0	0	0	0	0
25	DF	(Belarus) BLR	Aleksandr Pavlovets	14	0	10+3	0	0+1	0	0	0	0	0
31	GK	(Ukraine) UKR	Danylo Kucher	15	0	13	0	0	0	0	0	2	0
33	FW	(Ghana) GHA	Eric Ocansey	35	7	17+8	4	4+1	1	1	0	2+2	2
35	DF	(Brazil) BRA	Romércio	5	0	1+3	0	0+1	0	0	0	0	0
45	FW	(Cameroon) CMR	Marius Noubissi	32	22	21+5	18	4+1	2	1	2	0	0
96	GK	(Armenia) ARM	Henri Avagyan	16	0	10	0	5	0	1	0	0	0
Players away on loan:
6	MF	(Armenia) ARM	Michel Ayvazyan	2	0	0+1	0	0	0	0	0	0+1	0
9	FW	(Armenia) ARM	Artur Serobyan	19	5	12+3	2	0	0	0	0	4	3
Players who left Ararat-Armenia during the season:
7	MF	(Argentina) ARG	Alexis Rodríguez	19	4	6+9	4	0	0	0	0	2+2	0
24	GK	(Armenia) ARM	Arsen Beglaryan	9	0	6+1	0	0	0	0	0	2	0

=== Goal scorers ===
Place	Position	Nation	Number	Name	Premier League	Armenian Cup	Supercup	Conference League	Total
1	FW	(Cameroon)	45	Marius Noubissi	18	2	2	0	22
2	FW	(Nigeria)	15	Tenton Yenne	17	1	1	1	20
3	FW	(Ghana)	33	Eric Ocansey	4	1	0	2	7
4	FW	(Nigeria)	17	Matthew Gbomadu	6	0	0	0	6
4	MF	(Russia)	10	Armen Ambartsumyan	6	0	0	0	6
6	MF	(Armenia)	7	Zhirayr Shaghoyan	5	0	0	0	5
6	MF	(Colombia)	11	Jonathan Duarte	3	0	0	2	5
6	FW	(Armenia)	9	Artur Serobyan	2	0	0	3	5
9	MF	(Argentina)	7	Alexis Rodríguez	4	0	0	0	4
9	MF	(Kenya)	20	Alwyn Tera	3	1	0	0	4
11	MF	(Armenia)	8	Hovhannes Harutyunyan	2	0	0	1	3
12				Own goal	0	1	1	0	2
13	DF	(Portugal)	4	João Queirós	1	0	0	0	1
13	MF	(Armenia)	19	Karen Muradyan	1	0	0	0	1
				Awarded	3	0	0	0	3
				TOTALS	75	6	4	9	94

=== Clean sheets ===
Place	Position	Nation	Number	Name	Premier League	Armenian Cup	Supercup	Conference League	Total
1	GK	(Ukraine)	31	Danylo Kucher	7	0	0	0	7
1	GK	(Armenia)	96	Henri Avagyan	4	2	1	0	7
3	GK	(Armenia)	24	Arsen Beglaryan	3	0	0	1	4
				TOTALS	13	2	1	1	17

Danylo Kucher & Arsen Beglaryan both played in Ararat-Armenia's 3-0 victory over Gandzasar on 14 September 2024

=== Disciplinary record ===
Number	Nation	Position	Name	Premier League		Armenian Cup		Supercup		Conference League		Total	
Number	Nation	Position	Name	Booked	Sent off (straight red)	Booked	Sent off (straight red)	Booked	Sent off (straight red)	Booked	Sent off (straight red)	Booked	Sent off (straight red)
3	(Colombia)	DF	Junior Bueno	5	1	3	1	0	0	0	0	8	2
4	(Portugal)	DF	João Queirós	11	1	1	0	0	0	0	0	12	1
5	(Armenia)	MF	Hakob Hakobyan	1	0	0	0	0	0	0	0	1	0
7	(Armenia)	MF	Zhirayr Shaghoyan	2	0	1	0	0	0	0	0	3	0
8	(Armenia)	MF	Hovhannes Harutyunyan	3	0	0	0	0	0	1	0	4	0
10	(Russia)	MF	Armen Ambartsumyan	3	0	1	0	0	0	1	0	5	0
11	(Colombia)	MF	Jonathan Duarte	5	0	1	0	0	0	2	0	8	0
12	(Kenya)	MF	Amos Nondi	5	1	1	0	0	0	1	1	7	2
13	(Armenia)	DF	Kamo Hovhannisyan	1	0	0	0	0	0	0	0	1	0
15	(Nigeria)	FW	Tenton Yenne	3	0	0	0	0	0	1	0	4	0
16	(Armenia)	DF	Edgar Grigoryan	3	0	2	0	0	0	2	0	7	0
19	(Armenia)	MF	Karen Muradyan	7	0	1	0	0	0	0	0	8	0
20	(Kenya)	MF	Alwyn Tera	2	0	0	0	0	0	0	0	2	0
25	(Belarus)	DF	Aleksandr Pavlovets	4	0	0	0	0	0	0	0	4	0
31	(Ukraine)	GK	Danylo Kucher	1	0	0	0	0	0	0	0	1	0
33	(Ghana)	FW	Eric Ocansey	2	0	0	0	0	0	0	0	2	0
45	(Cameroon)	FW	Marius Noubissi	6	1	1	0	0	0	0	0	7	1
Players away on loan:
9	(Armenia)	FW	Artur Serobyan	1	0	0	0	0	0	0	0	1	0
Players who left Ararat-Armenia during the season:
7	(Argentina)	MF	Alexis Rodríguez	3	0	0	0	0	0	2	0	5	0
			TOTALS	68	4	12	1	0	0	10	1	90	6
