= 2023–24 FC Ararat-Armenia season =

Ararat-Armenia
2023-24 season
- Chairman: Rafik Hayrapetyan
- Manager: Vardan Minasyan
- Stadium: Republican Stadium
- Premier League: 3rd
- Armenian Cup: Winners
- UEFA Europa Conference League: Second qualifying round
- Top goalscorer: League: Mohamed Yattara (18); All: Mohamed Yattara (18)
Home colours	Away colours

The 2023–24 season was FC Ararat-Armenia's 6th season in Armenian Premier League.

== Season overview ==
On 9 June, Ararat-Armenia announced the signing of Arsen Beglaryan from Urartu.

On 17 June, Ararat-Armenia announced the return of Vardan Minasyan as their head coach.

On 1 July, Ararat-Armenia announced the signing of Adriano Castanheira from Paços de Ferreira. The following day 2 July, Ararat-Armenia announced the signing of Cássio Scheid from BG Pathum United.

On 17 July, Ararat-Armenia announced the signing of Leonardo da Silva from Sampaio Corrêa.

On 21 July, Styopa Mkrtchyan joined NK Osijek on a season-long loan deal with an option to make the move permanent.

On 14 August, Ararat-Armenia announced the signing of Mohamed Yattara from Pau.

On 6 September, Ararat-Armenia announced the signing of Nikolai Kipiani from Dinamo Batumi.

On 27 December, Técnico Universitario announced the signing of Carlos Pérez from Ararat-Armenia.

On 9 January, Ararat-Armenia announced the return of Zhirayr Shaghoyan from his loan with CSKA Sofia. The following day, 10 January, Ararat-Armenia announced the return of Artur Serobyan from his loan deal with Casa Pia.

On 12 January, Vsevolod Ermakov left Ararat-Armenia by mutual consent. The following day, 13 January, Narek Alaverdyan returned from a three-and-a-half-year loan deal with BKMA Yerevan, and Ararat-Armenia announced the signing of free agent Damjan Shishkovski.

On 15 January, Ararat-Armenia announced the signing of Petros Avetisyan on loan from Khimki until the end of the season.

On 20 January, Ararat-Armenia announced the signing of Kamo Hovhannisyan, who'd recently left Astana.

On 23 January, NK Osijek announced the permanent signing of Styopa Mkrtchyan.

On 26 January, Ararat-Armenia announced that Matthew Gbomadu had joined Van on loan for the remainder of the season, whilst also confirming the signing of Alexis Rodríguez.

On 15 February, Hakob Hakobyan left the club to sign for Van on loan for the rest of the season.

== Squad ==
As of match played 26 May 2024

Number	Name	Nationality	Position	Date of birth (age)	Signed from	Signed in	Contract ends	Apps.	Goals
Goalkeepers
1	Rafael Manasyan	(Armenia)	GK	22 May 2003 (aged 21)	Academy	2021		0	0
24	Arsen Beglaryan	(Armenia)	GK	18 February 1993 (aged 31)	Urartu	2023		24	0
30	Damjan Shishkovski	(North Macedonia)	GK	18 March 1995 (aged 29)	Unattached	2024		9	0
Defenders
2	Alemão	(Brazil)	DF	7 December 1992 (aged 31)	Oliveirense	2020		119	10
3	Junior Bueno	(Colombia)	DF	3 September 1996 (aged 27)	Once Caldas	2021		93	3
5	Davit Terteryan	(Armenia)	DF	17 December 1997 (aged 26)	Gandzasar Kapan	2021		76	1
14	Leonardo da Silva	(Brazil)	DF	22 April 2000 (aged 24)	Sampaio Corrêa	2023		25	1
16	Edgar Grigoryan	(Armenia)	DF	25 August 1998 (aged 25)	Unattached	2023		45	0
22	Kamo Hovhannisyan	(Armenia)	DF	5 October 1992 (aged 31)	Unattached	2024		17	1
41	Cássio Scheid	(Brazil)	DF	3 January 1994 (aged 30)	BG Pathum United	2023		30	0
Midfielders
8	Alexis Rodríguez	(Argentina)	MF	21 March 1996 (aged 28)	Unattached	2024		16	5
10	Armen Ambartsumyan	(Russia)	MF	11 April 1994 (aged 30)	Fakel Voronezh	2018		180	9
11	Jonathan Duarte	(Colombia)	MF	25 May 1997 (aged 27)	Orsomarso	2022		63	12
12	Amos Nondi	(Kenya)	MF	10 February 1999 (aged 25)	Dila Gori	2023		49	1
13	Nikolai Kipiani	(Russia)	MF	25 January 1997 (aged 27)	Dinamo Batumi	2023		21	1
19	Karen Muradyan	(Armenia)	MF	11 November 1992 (aged 31)	Ararat Yerevan	2021		105	0
20	Alwyn Tera	(Kenya)	MF	18 January 1997 (aged 27)	Saburtalo Tbilisi	2021		100	5
21	Narek Alaverdyan	(Armenia)	MF	19 February 2002 (aged 22)	Youth Team	2019		5	0
23	Zhirayr Shaghoyan	(Armenia)	MF	10 April 2001 (aged 23)	Academy	2017		80	15
34	Erik Smbatyan	(Armenia)	MF	10 February 2003 (aged 21)	Academy	2022		1	0
36	Michel Ayvazyan	(Armenia)	MF	21 June 2005 (aged 18)	Academy	2022		10	1
77	Petros Avetisyan	(Armenia)	MF	7 January 1996 (aged 28)	on loan from Khimki	2024	2024	50	15
Forwards
7	Adriano Castanheira	(Portugal)	FW	7 April 1993 (aged 31)	Paços de Ferreira	2023		34	4
9	Artur Serobyan	(Armenia)	FW	2 July 2003 (aged 20)	Academy	2020		55	13
15	Tenton Yenne	(Nigeria)	FW	7 July 2000 (aged 23)	Noravank	2022		77	27
18	Artyom Avanesyan	(Armenia)	FW	17 July 1999 (aged 24)	Ararat Moscow	2018		119	13
27	Mohamed Yattara	(Guinea)	FW	28 July 1993 (aged 30)	Pau	2023		30	18
Away on loan
17	Matthew Gbomadu	(Nigeria)	FW	16 October 2004 (aged 19)	FDC Vista	2023		17	2
55	Hakob Hakobyan	(Armenia)	MF	29 March 1997 (aged 27)	Urartu	2022		38	2
	Hayk Khachatryan	(Armenia)	GK	27 January 2005 (aged 19)	Academy	2021		0	0
	Wbeymar	(Armenia)	MF	6 March 1992 (aged 32)	Gandzasar Kapan	2020		52	1
	Misak Hakobyan	(Armenia)	FW	11 June 2004 (aged 19)	Academy	2021		0	0
	Agdon Menezes	(Brazil)	FW	26 January 1993 (aged 31)	Varzim	2022		15	4
Left during the season
8	Gevorg Ghazaryan	(Armenia)	MF	5 April 1988 (aged 36)	Pyunik	2022		21	2
17	Hilary Gong	(Nigeria)	FW	10 October 1998 (aged 25)	GBS Academy	2023		10	0
29	Jesse Akila	(Nigeria)	FW	27 December 2001 (aged 22)	Plateau United	2022		17	1
32	Carlos Pérez	(Colombia)	DF	15 June 1995 (aged 28)	Alianza Petrolera	2023		16	1
45	Vsevolod Ermakov	(Russia)	GK	6 January 1996 (aged 28)	Ararat Yerevan	2022		50	0
88	Wilfried Eza	(Ivory Coast)	FW	28 December 1996 (aged 27)	Van	2021		77	27
	Albert Khachumyan	(Armenia)	DF	23 June 1999 (aged 24)	Academy	2017		62	4
	Styopa Mkrtchyan	(Armenia)	DF	17 February 2003 (aged 21)	Academy	2020		10	0

=== Out on loan ===
Note: Flags indicate national team as defined under FIFA eligibility rules; some limited exceptions apply. Players may hold more than one non-FIFA nationality.

No.	Pos.	Nation	Player
—	GK	ARM	Hayk Khachatryan (at BKMA Yerevan)
—	MF	ARM	Wbeymar (at Alashkert)

No.	Pos.	Nation	Player
—	FW	ARM	Misak Hakobyan (at BKMA Yerevan)
—	FW	BRA	Agdon (at Alashkert)

== Transfers ==
=== In ===
Date	Position	Nationality	Name	From	Fee	Ref.
9 June 2023	GK	(Armenia)	Arsen Beglaryan	Urartu	Undisclosed	
1 July 2023	FW	(Portugal)	Adriano Castanheira	Paços de Ferreira	Undisclosed	
2 July 2023	DF	(Brazil)	Cássio Scheid	BG Pathum United	Undisclosed	
17 July 2023	DF	(Brazil)	Leonardo da Silva	Sampaio Corrêa	Undisclosed	
14 August 2023	FW	(Guinea)	Mohamed Yattara	Pau	Undisclosed	
6 September 2023	MF	(Russia)	Nikolai Kipiani	Dinamo Batumi	Undisclosed	
13 January 2024	GK	(North Macedonia)	Damjan Shishkovski	Unattached	Free	
20 January 2024	DF	(Armenia)	Kamo Hovhannisyan	Unattached	Free	
26 January 2024	MF	(Argentina)	Alexis Rodríguez	Unattached	Free	

=== Loans in ===
Date from	Position	Nationality	Name	To	Date to	Ref.
27 February 2023	FW	(Nigeria)	Hilary Gong	GBS Academy	15 July 2023	
15 January 2024	MF	(Armenia)	Petros Avetisyan	Khimki	End of season	

=== Out ===
Date	Position	Nationality	Name	To	Fee	Ref.
1 July 2023	FW	(Armenia)	Armen Nahapetyan	Ararat Yerevan	Undisclosed	
31 August 2023	FW	(Ivory Coast)	Wilfried Eza	SV Ried	Undisclosed	
27 December 2023	DF	(Colombia)	Carlos Pérez	Técnico Universitario	Undisclosed	
23 January 2024	DF	(Armenia)	Styopa Mkrtchyan	NK Osijek	Undisclosed	

=== Loans out ===
Date from	Position	Nationality	Name	To	Date to	Ref.
26 July 2020	MF	(Armenia)	Narek Alaverdyan	BKMA Yerevan	13 January 2024	
20 January 2022	DF	(Armenia)	Albert Khachumyan	BKMA Yerevan	31 December 2023	
6 September 2022	MF	(Armenia)	Zhirayr Shaghoyan	CSKA Sofia	9 January 2024	
21 July 2023	DF	(Armenia)	Styopa Mkrtchyan	NK Osijek	23 January 2024	
1 September 2023	FW	(Armenia)	Artur Serobyan	Casa Pia	10 January 2024	
26 January 2024	FW	(Nigeria)	Matthew Gbomadu	Van	End of season	
15 February 2024	MF	(Armenia)	Hakob Hakobyan	Van	End of season	

=== Released ===
Date	Position	Nationality	Name	Joined	Date	Ref
15 June 2023	DF	(Croatia)	Dragan Lovrić	Oțelul Galați	17 July 2023	
15 June 2023	FW	(Portugal)	Hugo Firmino	Penafiel	3 July 2023	
19 June 2023	MF	(Armenia)	Solomon Udo	Caspiy	22 July 2023	
21 June 2023	FW	(Nigeria)	Taofiq Jibril	Pyunik	29 June 2023	
23 June 2023	MF	(Cape Verde)	Mailson Lima	Aksu	12 August 2023	
28 June 2023	GK	(Russia)	Dmitry Abakumov	Urartu	28 June 2023	
29 July 2023	FW	(Nigeria)	Jesse Akila	AS Trenčín	29 July 2023	
30 August 2023	MF	(Armenia)	Gevorg Ghazaryan	Retired		
31 December 2023	DF	(Armenia)	Albert Khachumyan	Ararat Yerevan	1 January 2024	
12 January 2024	GK	(Russia)	Vsevolod Ermakov	Alashkert	12 January 2024	

== Friendlies ==
30 June 2023	Ararat-Armenia	3–2	(Russia) Vista Gelendzhik	Yerevan
11:00 (UTC+4)	Goal	Report	Goal	Stadium: Yerevan Football Academy Stadium

30 June 2023	Ararat-Armenia	6–0	West Armenia	Yerevan
18:00 (UTC+4)	Goal	Report		Stadium: Yerevan Football Academy Stadium

2 July 2023	Saburtalo Tbilisi (Georgia (country))	1–3	Ararat-Armenia	Tbilisi, Georgia
18:00 (UTC+4)	Goal	Report	Serobyan; Eza	Stadium: Mikheil Meskhi Stadium

7 July 2023	Samgurali Tsqaltubo (Georgia (country))	0–2	Ararat-Armenia	Tsqaltubo, Georgia
11:30 (UTC+4)		Report	Yenne (o.g.)	Stadium: 26 May Stadium

9 September 2023	Ararat-Armenia	2–3	(Russia) Vista Gelendzhik	Yerevan
12:15 (UTC+4)	Scheid; Terteryan	Report	Goal	Stadium: Yerevan Football Academy Stadium

22 February 2024	Ararat-Armenia	3–0	Shirak	Yerevan
(UTC+4)		Report		Stadium: Yerevan Football Academy Stadium

28 January 2024	Ararat-Armenia	3–0	(Serbia) Čukarički	Cyprus
14:00 (UTC+4)	Tera; Duarte	Report

28 January 2024	Ararat-Armenia	2–1	(Serbia) Vojvodina	Cyprus
19:00 (UTC+4)	Tera; Duarte	Report	Goal

3 February 2024	Botev Vratsa (Bulgaria)	2–2	Ararat-Armenia	Cyprus
14:00 (UTC+4)	Traorè 45'; Perea 45'	Report	Yenne; Ambartsumyan

9 February 2024	Vendsyssel (Denmark)	1–0	Ararat-Armenia	Cyprus
13:30 (UTC+4)	Jensen 59'	Report	(red card) 88'

12 February 2024	Ararat-Armenia	0–0	(Lithuania) Kauno Žalgiris	Cyprus
16:30 (UTC+4)		Report

15 February 2024	Ararat-Armenia	3–0	(Serbia) Grafičar Beograd	Cyprus
14:30 (UTC+4)	Yattara; Serobyan; Castanheira	Report

== Competitions ==
=== Overview ===
Competition	First match	Last match	Starting round	Final position	Record							
Competition	First match	Last match	Starting round	Final position	Pld	W	D	L	GF	GA	GD	Win %
Premier League	30 July 2023	26 May 2024	Matchday 1	3rd	36	23	6	7	73	34	+39	63.89
Armenian Cup	24 November 2023	12 May 2024	Second Round	Winners	4	3	1	0	6	3	+3	75.00
UEFA Europa Conference League	13 July 2023	4 August 2023	First qualifying round	Second qualifying round	4	0	3	1	6	7	−1	0.00
Total					44	26	10	8	85	44	+41	59.09

Last updated: 26 May 2024
Source: Competitions

=== Premier League ===
==== Results summary ====
Overall								Home						Away					
Pld	W	D	L	GF	GA	GD	Pts	W	D	L	GF	GA	GD	W	D	L	GF	GA	GD
36	23	6	7	73	34	+39	75	12	1	4	38	18	+20	11	5	3	35	16	+19

Last updated: 26 May 2024.
Source: See Results

==== Results by round ====
Round	1	2	3	4	5	6	7	8	9	10	11	12	13	14	15	16	17	18	19	20	21	22	23	24	25	26	27	28	29	30	31	32	33	34	35	36
Ground	A	A	A (Note: matchday 4)	H (Note: matchday 3)	H	A	H	A	H	H	H	A	H	A	H	A	H	A	A	A	H	A	H	A	H	A	H	H	H	A	A	A	H	A	H	A
Result	W	L	W	L	W	D	W	W	W	W	L	D	W	W	W	L	W	D	W	W	W	D	L	W	L	W	W	W	W	D	W	W	W	L	D	W
Position	2	4	5	6	5	5	4	4	2	2	3	3	3	2	2	3	2	3	3	3	2	3	3	3	3	3	3	3	3	3	3	3	3	3	3	3

Updated to match(es) played on 26 May 2024. Source: See Results
A = Away; H = Home; W = Win; D = Draw; L = Loss

==== Results ====
30 July 2023 1	Ararat Yerevan	1–3	Ararat-Armenia	Yerevan
20:00 (UTC+4)	da Silva 18' (o.g.); Mzoughi (yellow card) 45+1'; Malakyan (yellow card) 88'	Report	Hakobyan (yellow card) 45'; Gbomadu 63'; Bueno (yellow card) 72'; Yenne 82', 90+5'	Stadium: Republican Stadium; Referee: Vardan Manukyan

7 August 2023 2	Urartu	2–1	Ararat-Armenia	Yerevan
20:00 (UTC+4)	Margaryan (yellow card) 6'; Antwi 45+2'; Ghazaryan (yellow card) 75'; Dzhikiya 90+2'	Report	Beglaryan (yellow card) 58'; Avanesyan (yellow card) 60'; Yenne 70'; Serobyan (yellow card) 74'; Nondi (yellow card) 78'	Stadium: Urartu Stadium; Referee: Ashot Ghaltakhchyan

20 August 2023 4	West Armenia	1–4	Ararat-Armenia	Yerevan
17:00 (UTC+4)	Movsisyan 41'; Metoyan (yellow card) 45+4'; Strelnik (yellow card) 56'	Report	Castanheira (yellow card) 37'; Nondi (yellow card) 45+3'; Scheid (yellow card) 45+4'; Avanesyan 53'; Yenne 58', 86'; Eza 79'; Terteryan (yellow card) 82'; Yattara (yellow card) 90+3'	Stadium: Junior Sports Stadium; Referee: Davit Mkrtchyan

23 August 2023 3	Ararat-Armenia	1–2	Pyunik	Yerevan
19:00 (UTC+4)	Yenne 21' (yellow card) 69' (yellow-red card) 73'; Muradyan (yellow card) 69'; Nondi (yellow card) 90+4'	Report	Villela (yellow card) 60'; Dashyan 70' (pen.); Juninho 76'; Buchnev (yellow card) 90+3'	Stadium: FFA Stadium; Referee: Artem Gasparyan
Note: Match original scheduled for 14 August 2023, but postponed on 11 August 2023, due to Pyunik making an emergency landing on the way back from their UEFA Europa Conference League against Bodø/Glimt on 10 August 2023.

27 August 2023 5	Ararat-Armenia	3–0	Van	Yerevan
19:00 (UTC+4)	Serobyan 19', 66' (pen.); Yattara (yellow card) 45+4'; Tera 48'; Terteryan (yellow card) 90+2'	Report	Asoyan (yellow card) 31'; Ojetunde (yellow card) 40'; Boniface (yellow card) 90+1' (yellow-red card) 90+2'; Manoyan (yellow card) 90+2'	Stadium: FFA Stadium; Referee: Ashot Ghaltakhchyan

1 September 2023 6	BKMA Yerevan	1–1	Ararat-Armenia	Yerevan
19:00 (UTC+4)	Khachumyan (yellow card) 45+1'; Tarakhchyan 58'; Alaverdyan (yellow card) 74'	Report	Yattara 14'; Tera (yellow card) 16'; Gbomadu (yellow card) 68'	Stadium: FFA Stadium; Referee: Zaven Hovhannisyan

15 September 2023 7	Ararat-Armenia	4–3	Noah	Yerevan
19:00 (UTC+4)	Yattara 12', 40' (yellow card) 54'; Castanheira 45+1', 70'; Yenne (yellow card) 54' da Silva (yellow card) 75'; Ermakov (yellow card) 90+3'; Nondi (yellow card) 90+7'	Report	Miljković (yellow card) 34'; Varela 51'; Gladon 67'; Muradyan 86'	Stadium: FFA Stadium; Referee: Henrik Nalbandian

19 September 2023 8	Shirak	1–3	Ararat-Armenia	Gyumri
19:00 (UTC+4)	Vidić 55' (yellow card) 90+4'	Report	Tera (yellow card) 15'; Yenne (yellow card) 34'; Yattara 40', 63', 76'; Muradyan (yellow card) 90+4'; Avanesyan (yellow card) 90+4'	Stadium: City Stadium; Referee: Artak Vardanyan

25 September 2023 9	Ararat-Armenia	3–1	Alashkert	Yerevan
18:00 (UTC+4)	Kipiani 12'; Bueno (yellow card) 25'; Yattara 34'; Nondi (yellow card) 56'; Yenne 90+5' (pen.)	Report	Yedigaryan (yellow card) 19' (yellow-red card) 47'; Kutalia (yellow card) 45+1'; Nalbandyan (yellow card) 84' (goal) 90+7'; Flores (yellow card) 90+2'; Agdon (yellow card) 90+4'; Voskanyan (yellow card) 90+5'	Stadium: FFA Stadium; Referee: Ashot Ghaltakhchyan

29 September 2023 10	Ararat-Armenia	2–1	Ararat Yerevan	Yerevan
17:00 (UTC+4)	Yattara 25'; Ambartsumyan (yellow card) 31'; Gbomadu 81'	Report	Moustapha (yellow card) 72'; Nahapetyan 87'	Stadium: FFA Stadium; Referee: Sargis Khachatryan

3 October 2023 11	Ararat-Armenia	1–2	Urartu	Yerevan
17:00 (UTC+4)	Castanheira 11'; Yattara (yellow card) 16'; Bueno (yellow card) 44'; Nondi (yellow card) 52'; Alemão (yellow card) 62'; Grigoryan (yellow card) 81'; Scheid (yellow card) 90'; Ambartsumyan (yellow card) 90+5'	Report	Zotko (yellow card) 19'; Alemão 22' (o.g.); Prudnikov 54'; Tarakhchyan (yellow card) 70'; Salou (yellow card) 86'; Abakumov (yellow card) 89'	Stadium: FFA Stadium; Referee: Henrik Nalbandian

20 October 2023 12	Pyunik	1–1	Ararat-Armenia	Yerevan
18:00 (UTC+4)	Bratkov (yellow card) 24'; Villela 28'; Otubanjo (yellow card) 56'	Report	Ambartsumyan (yellow card) 39'; Muradyan (yellow card) 78'; Tera 90+1'; Alemão (yellow card) 90+6'	Stadium: Junior Sports Stadium; Referee: Henrik Nalbandian

24 October 2023 13	Ararat-Armenia	4–0	West Armenia	Yerevan
16:00 (UTC+4)	Yattara 2', 32'; Kharatyan 19' (o.g.); Alemão (yellow card) 64'; Ayvazyan 87'	Report	Strelnik (yellow card) 28'; Mwijage (yellow card) 47'	Stadium: FFA Stadium; Referee: Ashot Harutyunyan

28 October 2023 14	Van	0–2	Ararat-Armenia	Charentsavan
15:00 (UTC+4)	Asoyan (yellow card) 10'	Report	Yenne (yellow card) 44'; Bueno 56'; Tera (yellow card) 80'; Duarte 86'	Stadium: City Stadium; Referee: Zaven Hovhannisyan

2 November 2023 15	Ararat-Armenia	4–1	BKMA Yerevan	Yerevan
18:00 (UTC+4)	Yenne 20' (pen.); Yattara 51'; Alemão 60'; Avanesyan 62'	Report	Nikoghosyan (yellow card) 47'; G.Petrosyan 71'	Stadium: FFA Stadium; Referee: Davit Mkrtchyan

7 November 2023 16	Noah	1–0	Ararat-Armenia	Abovyan
18:00 (UTC+4)	Movsesyan 18' (yellow card) 77'; Gladon (yellow card) 37'; Muradyan (yellow card) 40'	Report	Muradyan (yellow card) 50'; Nondi (yellow card) 55' (yellow-red card) 72'; Grigoryan (yellow card) 86'; Tera (yellow card) 90'; Castanheira (yellow card) 90'	Stadium: City Stadium; Referee: Henrik Nalbandian

11 November 2023 17	Ararat-Armenia	2–0	Shirak	Yerevan
18:00 (UTC+4)	Muradyan (yellow card) 40' da Silva 62'; Duarte 86'	Report	Misakyan (yellow card) 45+6'; Mnatsakanyan (yellow card) 66'	Stadium: FFA Stadium; Referee: Yura Mahtesyan

30 November 2023 18	Alashkert	1–1	Ararat-Armenia	Yerevan
14:30 (UTC+4)	Agdon 22'; Kocharyan (yellow card) 67'	Report	Ambartsumyan 40' (yellow card) 89'	Stadium: Alashkert Stadium; Referee: Vardan Manukyan

5 December 2023 19	Ararat Yerevan	0–1	Ararat-Armenia	Yerevan
16:00 (UTC+4)	Malakyan (yellow card) 36'	Report	Yattara 4'; Alemão (yellow card) 38'	Stadium: Republican Stadium; Referee: Ashot Harutyunyan

9 December 2023 20	Urartu	1–3	Ararat-Armenia	Yerevan
18:00 (UTC+4)	Polyakov (yellow card) 37'; Piloyan (yellow card) 45+7'; Mirzoyan 90+8'	Report	Yattara 22' (pen.); Yenne 38', 45+6'; Muradyan (yellow card) 90+1'	Stadium: Urartu Stadium; Referee: Ashot Ghaltakhchyan

23 February 2024 21	Ararat-Armenia	3–1	Pyunik	Yerevan
18:00 (UTC+4)	Duarte (yellow card) 28'; Yenne 30', 90+1'; Yattara 41'; Alemão (yellow card) 54'	Report	Villela (yellow card) 62'; Otubanjo 78'	Stadium: FFA Stadium; Referee: Yura Mahtesyan

28 February 2024 22	West Armenia	1–1	Ararat-Armenia	Yerevan
15:00 (UTC+4)	Khomutov (yellow card) 45+5'; Ufuoma (yellow card) 60'; Metoyan 87'	Report	Tera 39'; Kipiani (yellow card) 64'; Yenne (yellow card) 68'; Nondi (yellow card) 90+8'	Stadium: FFA Stadium; Referee: Davit Mkrtchyan

3 March 2024 23	Ararat-Armenia	0–2	Van	Yerevan
15:00 (UTC+4)	Muradyan (red card) 51'; Castanheira (yellow card) 90+3'	Report	Yahaya (yellow card) 39'; Mkrtchyan (yellow card) 49'; Buhari 59'; Yeghiazaryan (yellow card) 63'; Ojetunde 90+9'	Stadium: FFA Stadium; Referee: Yura Mahtesyan

7 March 2024 24	BKMA Yerevan	0–1	Ararat-Armenia	Yerevan
15:00 (UTC+4)	Arakelyan (yellow card) 85'; N.Hovhannisyan (yellow card) 90+5'	Report	Serobyan 90+10'; Shaghoyan (yellow card) 90+11'	Stadium: FFA Stadium; Referee: Ashot Ghaltakhchyan

15 March 2024 25	Ararat-Armenia	0–1	Noah	Yerevan
19:00 (UTC+4)	Hovhannisyan (yellow card) 33'; Scheid (yellow card) 57'; Yenne (yellow card) 80'; Alemão (yellow card) 89'; Yattara (yellow card) 90+5'	Report	Gamboš (yellow card) 30'; Mathieu (yellow card) 70'; Gladon 77'; S.Muradyan (yellow card) 82'; Movsesyan (yellow card) 84'; Minasyan (yellow card) 90+3'; Čančarević (yellow card) 90+5'	Stadium: FFA Stadium; Referee: Henrik Nalbandian

31 March 2024 26	Shirak	0–1	Ararat-Armenia	Gyumri
17:00 (UTC+4)	Darbinyan (yellow card) 53'; Mkoyan (yellow card) 74'	Report	Shaghoyan (yellow card) 51'; Grigoryan (yellow card) 64'; Alemão 90+7'	Stadium: City Stadium; Referee: Vardan Manukyan

4 April 2024 27	Ararat-Armenia	2–1	Alashkert	Yerevan
19:00 (UTC+4)	Bueno (yellow card) 28'; Yattara (yellow card) 44'; Yenne (yellow card) 76' (goal) 81'; Avetisyan 90+8'	Report	Marmentini (yellow card) 67'; Nalbandyan 90+2'	Stadium: FFA Stadium; Referee: Ashot Ghaltakhchyan

12 April 2024 28	Ararat-Armenia	2–1	Ararat Yerevan	Yerevan
19:00 (UTC+4)	Avetisyan (yellow card) 52'; Yattara 59' (pen.); Rodríguez 88'	Report	Moustapha (yellow card) 26'; Grigoryan 45+2'; Mani (yellow card) 54'; Khachumyan (yellow card) 80'; Ransom (yellow card) 90+9'	Stadium: FFA Stadium; Referee: Henrik Nalbandian

17 April 2024 29	Ararat-Armenia	2–0	Urartu	Yerevan
19:00 (UTC+4)	Yenne (yellow card) 27' (goal) 86' (pen.); Yattara 42'	Report	Pešukić (yellow card) 81' (red card) 85'; Salou (yellow card) 85'	Stadium: FFA Stadium; Referee: Ashot Harutyunyan

21 April 2024 30	Pyunik	2–2	Ararat-Armenia	Yerevan
16:00 (UTC+4)	James 23' (yellow card) 90+9'; Villela 59' (pen.); Vakulenko (yellow card) 65'; Gonçalves (yellow card) 84'	Report	Yenne 16'; Grigoryan (yellow card) 56'; Muradyan (yellow card) 61'; Yattara 82' (pen.); Ambartsumyan (yellow card) 87'	Stadium: Junior Sports Stadium; Referee: Yura Mahtesyan

27 April 2024 31	West Armenia	0–1	Ararat-Armenia	Yerevan
16:00 (UTC+4)	Dramé (yellow card) 50'; Crivellaro (yellow card) 87'; Strelnik (yellow card) 90'	Report	Duarte 2'; Avetisyan (yellow card) 87'	Stadium: Junior Sports Stadium; Referee: Vardan Vardumyan

2 May 2024 32	Van	0–5	Ararat-Armenia	Charentsavan
16:00 (UTC+4)	Manucharyan (yellow card) 45+1'	Report	Alemão (yellow card) 21'; Shaghoyan 45+2', 62'; Muradyan (yellow card) 47'; Serobyan 69', 90+1' (pen.); Rodríguez 75'	Stadium: City Stadium; Referee: Zaven Hovhannisyan

7 May 2024 33	Ararat-Armenia	4–1	BKMA Yerevan	Yerevan
19:00 (UTC+4)	Duarte 6'; Rodríguez 23'; Shaghoyan 34'; Yenne 90+1'	Report	A.Petrosyan (yellow card) 48'; Khamoyan 81'; G.Petrosyan (yellow card) 86'; Abrahamyan (yellow card) 88'	Stadium: FFA Stadium; Referee: Henrik Nalbandian

16 May 2024 34	Noah	2–1	Ararat-Armenia	Abovyan
20:00 (UTC+4)	Alhaft 27'; Mathieu 43'	Report	Ambartsumyan (red card) 40'; Yattara 57'; Castanheira (yellow card) 79'	Stadium: City Stadium; Referee: Ashot Ghaltakhchyan

21 May 2024 35	Ararat-Armenia	1–1	Shirak	Yerevan
20:00 (UTC+4)	Kipiani (yellow card) 2'; Avetisyan (yellow card) 43'; Muradyan (yellow card) 45+1'; Shaghoyan 68'	Report	Misakyan 84'; Sadoyan (yellow card) 84'	Stadium: FFA Stadium; Referee: Henrik Nalbandian

26 May 2024 36	Alashkert	1–3	Ararat-Armenia	Yerevan
17:00 (UTC+4)	Wbeymar (yellow card) 15'; Désiré 90'	Report	Hovhannisyan 18'; Rodríguez 55'; Serobyan 71'	Stadium: Alashkert Stadium; Referee: Artur Gdlyan

==== League table ====
Pos	Team	Pld	W	D	L	GF	GA	GD	Pts	Qualification or relegation
1	Pyunik (C)	36	24	10	2	84	28	+56	82	Qualification for the Champions League first qualifying round
2	Noah	36	26	2	8	69	33	+36	80	Qualification for the Conference League first qualifying round
3	Ararat-Armenia	36	23	6	7	73	34	+39	75	Qualification for the Conference League second qualifying round (Note: Ararat-Armenia qualified for the Conference League second qualifying round by winning the 2023–24 Armenian Cup. Since they qualified based on league position, the second Conference League first round spot was passed to the fourth-placed team.)
4	Urartu	36	13	11	12	49	49	0	50	Qualification for the Conference League first qualifying round
5	Alashkert	36	13	6	17	54	56	−2	45	
6	Ararat Yerevan	36	13	6	17	39	50	−11	45	
7	West Armenia	36	11	4	21	43	73	−30	37	
8	Shirak	36	8	9	19	28	46	−18	33	
9	Van	36	8	8	20	32	67	−35	32	
10	BKMA	36	7	6	23	32	67	−35	27	

Source: FFA Soccerway
Rules for classification: 1) Points; 2) Head-to-head points; 3) Head-to-head goal difference; 4) Head-to-head goals scored; 5) Matches won; 6) Goal difference; 7) Less red cards; 8) Less yellow cards; 9) Fair-play ranking 10) Draw
(C) Champions

=== Armenian Cup ===
24 November 2023 Second Round	Ararat-Armenia	1–0	Gandzasar Kapan	Yerevan
18:00 (UTC+4)	Ambartsumyan (yellow card) 27'; Hakobyan (yellow card) 30'; Alemão 85'	Report	Zakaryan (yellow card) 24'; Nasr (yellow card) 27'; Kostic (yellow card) 58'	Stadium: FFA Stadium; Referee: Ashot Ghaltakhchyan

11 March 2024 Quarterfinal	Noah	2–3	Ararat-Armenia	Abovyan
18:00 (UTC+4)	Miranyan 13' (pen.); Mathieu (yellow card) 16'; Gamboš (yellow card) 46'; Alhaft 90'	Report	Tera (yellow card) 30'; Rodríguez 37'; Duarte 62'; Serobyan 82' (pen.); Shishkovski (yellow card) 90+2'	Stadium: City Stadium; Referee: Zaven Hovhannisyan

8 April 2024 Semifinal	Pyunik	0–1	Ararat-Armenia	Yerevan
15:00 (UTC+4)	Gonçalves (yellow card) 45+2'; Villela (yellow card) 90+5'	Report	Serobyan 32'; Muradyan (yellow card) 34'; Yenne (yellow card) 45+2'; Yattara (yellow card) 90+5' (yellow-red card) 90+5'; Beglaryan (yellow card) 90+9'	Stadium: Junior Sports Stadium; Referee: Zaven Hovhannisyan

12 May 2024 Final	Ararat-Armenia	1–1 (5–3 p)	Urartu	Yerevan
18:00 (UTC+4)	Ghazaryan 38' (o.g.); Nondi (yellow card) 88'; Serobyan (yellow card) 90'; Bueno (yellow card) 120+3'	Report	Mirzoyan 31'; Aghasaryan (yellow card) 46'; Tsymbalyuk (yellow card) 65'; Margaryan (yellow card) 90+4'	Stadium: Vazgen Sargsyan Republican Stadium; Referee: Artem Gasparyan
	Penalties
	Yenne (penalty scored); Avanesyan (penalty scored); Duarte (penalty scored); Shaghoyan (penalty scored); Hovhannisyan (penalty scored)		(penalty scored) Simonyan; (penalty missed) Margaryan; (penalty scored) Piloyan; (penalty scored) Melkonyan

=== UEFA Europa Conference League ===
==== Qualifying rounds ====
13 July 2023 First qualifying round 1st leg	Ararat-Armenia	1–1	(Albania) Egnatia	Yerevan, Armenia
19:00 (UTC+4)	Alemão 36'; Serobyan (yellow card) 63'; Hakobyan (yellow card) 72'; Tera (yellow card) 86'	Report	Lila (yellow card) 65'; Aleksi (yellow card) 79'; Dwamena 90+7'	Stadium: Yerevan Football Academy Stadium; Attendance: 1,380; Referee: Trustin Farrugia Cann (Malta)

20 July 2023 First qualifying round 2nd leg	Egnatia (Albania)	4–4 (a.e.t.) (5–5 agg.) (2–4 p)	Ararat-Armenia	Elbasan, Albania
22:00 (UTC+4)	Medeiros 4'; Musta (yellow card) 7'; Kasa 36'; Dwamena 108', 120+4'; Zejnullai (yellow card) 113'	Report	Nondi (yellow card) 7'; Eza 17'; Muradyan (yellow card) 33'; Castanheira 58'; Yenne 110' (yellow card) 113'; Bueno 113'; Ghazaryan (yellow card) 119'	Stadium: Elbasan Arena; Attendance: 1,200; Referee: Dragomir Draganov (Bulgaria)
	Penalties
	Dwamena (penalty scored); Zejnullai (penalty missed); Musta (penalty missed); Aleksi (penalty scored)		(penalty scored) Alemão; (penalty scored) Serobyan; (penalty scored) Castanheira; (penalty scored) Yenne
Note: Match played at the Elbasan Arena in Elbasan, instead of Egnatia's regular stadium, the Arena Egnatia in Rrogozhinë, which did not meet UEFA requirements.

27 July 2023 Second qualifying round 1st leg	Ararat-Armenia	1–1	(Greece) Aris Thessaloniki	Yerevan, Armenia
19:00 (UTC+4)	Eza 11'; Bueno (yellow card) 42'; Avanesyan (yellow card) 84'; Grigoryan (yellow card) 90+4'	Report	Palma 20'; Jules (yellow card) 52'; Morón (yellow card) 81'; Palma (yellow card) 84'; Julián (yellow card) 90+6'	Stadium: Yerevan Football Academy Stadium; Attendance: 1,400; Referee: Bulat Sariyev (Kazakhstan)

4 August 2023 Second qualifying round 2nd leg	Aris Thessaloniki (Greece)	1–0 (2–1 agg.)	Ararat-Armenia	Thessaloniki, Greece
00:15 (UTC+4)	Odubajo (yellow card) 42'; Fabiano 80'	Report	Grigoryan (yellow card) 29'; Scheid (yellow card) 33'; Eza (yellow card) 89'	Stadium: Kleanthis Vikelidis Stadium; Referee: Michael Fabbri (Italy)

== Squad statistics ==
As of match played 26 May 2024

=== Appearances and goals ===
No.	Pos	Nat	Player	Total		Premier League		Armenian Cup		Europa Conference League	
No.	Pos	Nat	Player	Apps	Goals	Apps	Goals	Apps	Goals	Apps	Goals
2	DF	(Brazil) BRA	Alemão	37	4	25+4	2	3+1	1	4	1
3	DF	(Colombia) COL	Junior Bueno	31	2	23+1	1	3	0	4	1
5	DF	(Armenia) ARM	Davit Terteryan	12	0	6+4	0	1	0	0+1	0
7	FW	(Portugal) POR	Adriano Castanheira	34	4	19+10	3	1	0	4	1
8	MF	(Argentina) ARG	Alexis Rodríguez	16	5	7+6	4	2+1	1	0	0
9	FW	(Armenia) ARM	Artur Serobyan	24	8	9+8	6	2+1	2	4	0
10	MF	(Russia) RUS	Armen Ambartsumyan	39	1	18+13	1	4	0	1+3	0
11	MF	(Colombia) COL	Jonathan Duarte	25	5	10+12	4	2+1	1	0	0
12	MF	(Kenya) KEN	Amos Nondi	35	0	17+11	0	0+3	0	3+1	0
13	MF	(Russia) RUS	Nikolai Kipiani	21	1	10+10	1	0+1	0	0	0
14	DF	(Brazil) BRA	Leonardo da Silva	25	1	20+3	1	2	0	0	0
15	FW	(Nigeria) NGR	Tenton Yenne	40	17	29+3	16	2+2	0	4	1
16	DF	(Armenia) ARM	Edgar Grigoryan	36	0	22+6	0	1+3	0	2+2	0
18	FW	(Armenia) ARM	Artyom Avanesyan	31	1	16+9	1	1+1	0	0+4	0
19	MF	(Armenia) ARM	Karen Muradyan	39	0	27+4	0	4	0	3+1	0
20	MF	(Kenya) KEN	Alwyn Tera	39	3	20+11	3	3+1	0	1+3	0
21	MF	(Armenia) ARM	Narek Alaverdyan	3	0	1+2	0	0	0	0	0
22	DF	(Armenia) ARM	Kamo Hovhannisyan	17	1	11+3	1	3	0	0	0
23	MF	(Armenia) ARM	Zhirayr Shaghoyan	16	4	7+7	4	0+2	0	0	0
24	GK	(Armenia) ARM	Arsen Beglaryan	24	0	21	0	3	0	0	0
27	FW	(Guinea) GUI	Mohamed Yattara	30	18	23+5	18	1+1	0	0	0
30	GK	(North Macedonia) MKD	Damjan Shishkovski	9	0	8	0	1	0	0	0
36	MF	(Armenia) ARM	Michel Ayvazyan	9	1	1+8	1	0	0	0	0
41	DF	(Brazil) BRA	Cássio Scheid	30	0	22+1	0	3	0	4	0
77	MF	(Armenia) ARM	Petros Avetisyan	11	1	4+7	1	0	0	0	0
Players away on loan:
17	FW	(Nigeria) NGR	Matthew Gbomadu	17	2	1+14	2	1	0	0+1	0
55	MF	(Armenia) ARM	Hakob Hakobyan	12	0	7+1	0	1	0	2+1	0
Players who left Ararat-Armenia during the season:
32	DF	(Colombia) COL	Carlos Pérez	9	0	2+5	0	0	0	0+2	0
45	GK	(Russia) RUS	Vsevolod Ermakov	11	0	7	0	0	0	4	0
88	FW	(Ivory Coast) CIV	Wilfried Eza	8	3	3+1	1	0	0	4	2

=== Goal scorers ===
Place	Position	Nation	Number	Name	Premier League	Armenian Cup	Europa Conference League	Total
1	FW	(Guinea)	27	Mohamed Yattara	18	0	0	18
2	FW	(Nigeria)	15	Tenton Yenne	16	0	1	17
3	FW	(Armenia)	9	Artur Serobyan	6	2	0	8
4	MF	(Colombia)	11	Jonathan Duarte	4	1	0	5
4	MF	(Argentina)	8	Alexis Rodríguez	4	1	0	5
6	MF	(Armenia)	23	Zhirayr Shaghoyan	4	0	0	4
6	FW	(Portugal)	7	Adriano Castanheira	3	0	1	4
6	DF	(Brazil)	2	Alemão	2	1	1	4
9	MF	(Kenya)	20	Alwyn Tera	3	0	0	3
9	FW	(Ivory Coast)	88	Wilfried Eza	1	0	2	3
11	FW	(Nigeria)	17	Matthew Gbomadu	2	0	0	2
11	FW	(Armenia)	18	Artyom Avanesyan	2	0	0	2
11	DF	(Colombia)	3	Junior Bueno	1	0	1	2
11				Own goal	1	1	0	2
14	MF	(Russia)	13	Nikolai Kipiani	1	0	0	1
14	MF	(Armenia)	36	Michel Ayvazyan	1	0	0	1
14	DF	(Brazil)	14	Leonardo da Silva	1	0	0	1
14	MF	(Russia)	10	Armen Ambartsumyan	1	0	0	1
14	MF	(Armenia)	77	Petros Avetisyan	1	0	0	1
14	DF	(Armenia)	22	Kamo Hovhannisyan	1	0	0	1
				TOTALS	73	6	6	85

=== Clean sheets ===
Place	Position	Nation	Number	Name	Premier League	Armenian Cup	Europa Conference League	Total
1	GK	(Armenia)	24	Arsen Beglaryan	6	2	0	8
2	GK	(North Macedonia)	30	Damjan Shishkovski	3	0	0	3
3	GK	(Russia)	45	Vsevolod Ermakov	1	0	0	1
				TOTALS	10	2	0	12

=== Disciplinary record ===
Number	Nation	Position	Name	Premier League		Armenian Cup		Europa Conference League		Total	
Number	Nation	Position	Name	Booked	Sent off (straight red)	Booked	Sent off (straight red)	Booked	Sent off (straight red)	Booked	Sent off (straight red)
2	(Brazil)	DF	Alemão	7	0	0	0	0	0	7	0
3	(Colombia)	DF	Junior Bueno	4	0	1	0	1	0	6	0
5	(Armenia)	DF	Davit Terteryan	2	0	0	0	0	0	2	0
7	(Portugal)	FW	Adriano Castanheira	4	0	0	0	0	0	4	0
8	(Armenia)	MF	Gevorg Ghazaryan	0	0	0	0	1	0	1	0
9	(Armenia)	FW	Artur Serobyan	1	0	1	0	1	0	3	0
10	(Russia)	MF	Armen Ambartsumyan	5	1	1	0	0	0	6	1
11	(Colombia)	MF	Jonathan Duarte	1	0	0	0	0	0	1	0
12	(Kenya)	MF	Amos Nondi	9	1	1	0	1	0	11	1
13	(Russia)	MF	Nikolai Kipiani	2	0	0	0	0	0	2	0
14	(Brazil)	DF	Leonardo da Silva	1	0	0	0	0	0	1	0
15	(Nigeria)	FW	Tenton Yenne	9	1	1	0	1	0	11	1
16	(Armenia)	DF	Edgar Grigoryan	4	0	0	0	2	0	6	0
18	(Armenia)	FW	Artyom Avanesyan	2	0	0	0	1	0	3	0
19	(Armenia)	MF	Karen Muradyan	9	1	1	0	1	0	11	1
20	(Kenya)	MF	Alwyn Tera	4	0	1	0	1	0	6	0
22	(Armenia)	DF	Kamo Hovhannisyan	1	0	0	0	0	0	1	0
23	(Armenia)	MF	Zhirayr Shaghoyan	2	0	0	0	0	0	2	0
24	(Armenia)	GK	Arsen Beglaryan	1	0	1	0	0	0	2	0
27	(Guinea)	FW	Mohamed Yattara	6	0	2	1	0	0	8	1
30	(North Macedonia)	GK	Damjan Shishkovski	0	0	1	0	0	0	1	0
41	(Brazil)	DF	Cássio Scheid	3	0	0	0	1	0	4	0
77	(Armenia)	MF	Petros Avetisyan	3	0	0	0	0	0	3	0
Players away on loan:
17	(Nigeria)	FW	Matthew Gbomadu	1	0	0	0	0	0	1	0
55	(Armenia)	MF	Hakob Hakobyan	1	0	1	0	1	0	3	0
Players who left Ararat-Armenia during the season:
45	(Russia)	GK	Vsevolod Ermakov	1	0	0	0	0	0	1	0
88	(Ivory Coast)	FW	Wilfried Eza	0	0	0	0	1	0	1	0
			TOTALS	83	4	12	1	13	0	108	5
