= Edgar Grigoryan =

Armenian footballer

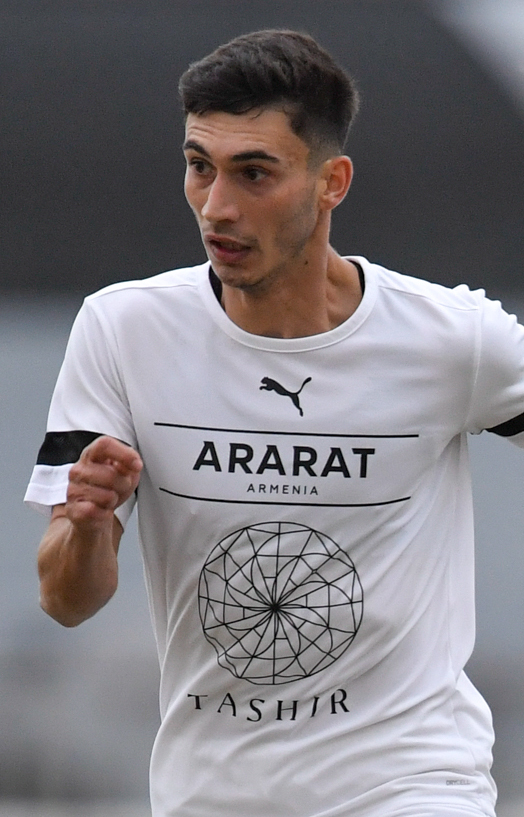

Personal information
- Date of birth: 25 August 1998 (age 28)
- Place of birth: Yerevan, Armenia
- Height: 1.79 m (5 ft 10 in)
- Position: Left-back

Team information
- Current team: Ararat-Armenia
- Number: 16

Youth career
- –2019: Banants

Senior career*
Years	Team	Apps	(Gls)
2017–2019	Banants II	22	(0)
2019–2023	Urartu	49	(0)
2019–2020	→ Noah (loan)	7	(0)
2023–	Ararat-Armenia	88	(0)

International career^{‡}
2014	Armenia U17	5	(0)
2016	Armenia U19	14	(0)
2019–2020	Armenia U21	8	(0)
2024–	Armenia	10	(0)
- * Club domestic league appearances and goals as of 18 August 2026 ‡ National team caps and goals as of 9 June 2026

Edgar Grigoryan (Armenian: Էդգար Գրիգորյան; born 25 August 1998) is an Armenian football player who plays as a left-back for Ararat-Armenia and the Armenia national team.

== Club career ==
Grigoryan is a graduate of the Urartu Football Academy (previously Banants), and began playing football at the age of 6.

At 30 July 2019 he signed a one-year loan deal with Noah. Before the start of the 2020–21 Armenian Premier League season he returned to Urartu.

On 20 December 2022, he terminated contract with his native club by mutual agreement. 12 January 2023, he moved to Ararat-Armenia.

== International career ==
On 15 March 2024, he received his first call-up to the Armenian senior national team for a friendly matches against Kosovo and Czech Republic respectively, replacing Nair Tiknizyan who previously left the squad due to injury.

Grigoryan made his debut for the Armenia national team on 22 March 2024 in a home friendly against Kosovo, coming off the bench. He was withdrawn from the squad for the away friendly match against the Czech Republic due to the absence of a Schengen visa.

== Career statistics ==
=== Club ===
As of match played 15 August 2026

Appearances and goals by club, season and competition
Club	Season	League			National cup		Continental		Other		Total	
Club	Season	Division	Apps	Goals	Apps	Goals	Apps	Goals	Apps	Goals	Apps	Goals
Ararat-Armenia	2022–23	Armenian Premier League	9	0	0	0	0 (Note: Appearances and goals in the UEFA Europa Conference League)	0	—		9	0
Ararat-Armenia	2023–24	Armenian Premier League	28	0	4	0	4	0	—		36	0
Ararat-Armenia	2024–25	Armenian Premier League	26	0	4	0	4	0	1 (Note: Appearance in the Armenian Super Cup)	0	35	0
Ararat-Armenia	2025–26	Armenian Premier League	25	0	3	0	4	0	1	0	33	0
Ararat-Armenia	2026–27	Armenian Premier League	0	0	0	0	5 (Note: Appearances and goals in the UEFA Champions League)	0	0	0	5	0
Ararat-Armenia	Total		88	0	11	0	17	0	2	0	118	0
Career total			88	0	11	0	17	0	2	0	118	0

=== International ===
As of 9 June 2026

Armenia
Year	Apps	Goals
2024	4	0
2025	5	0
2026	1	0
Total	10	0

== Honours ==
Noah

- Armenian Cup (1): 2019–20

Ararat-Armenia

- Armenian Premier League: 2025–26
- Armenian Cup: 2023–24
- Armenian Supercup: 2024

Urartu

- Armenian Premier League: 2022–23
