= Amos Nondi =

Kenyan footballer (born 1999)

Personal information
- Date of birth: 10 February 1999 (age 27)
- Place of birth: Ruiru, Kenya
- Position: Midfielder

Senior career*
Years	Team	Apps	(Gls)
2016–2017	Gor Mahia		
2017–2018	Kolkheti-1913	16	(1)
2018–2023	Dila	128	(0)
2023–2025	Ararat-Armenia	63	(1)
2025–2026	Partizani Tirana	1	(0)

International career^{‡}
2021–	Kenya	17	(1)
- * Club domestic league appearances and goals as of 12 September 2026 ‡ National team caps and goals as of 1 December 2024

Amos Nondi Obiero (born 10 February 1999) is a Kenyan professional footballer who plays as a midfielder.

== Club career ==
Nondi began his career with Gor Mahia, where he was described as a "fixture in the matchday squad".

On 18 January 2023, Ararat-Armenia announced the signing of Nondi from Dila Gori. On 5 July 2025, Ararat-Armenia announced the departure of Nondi by mutual agreement.

== Style of play ==
Nondi mainly operates as a midfielder but also has played as a right-back.

== Personal life ==
Nondi has regarded Kenya international Victor Wanyama as his football idol.

== Career statistics ==
=== Club ===
As of match played 28 May 2025

Appearances and goals by club, season and competition
Club	Season	League			National Cup		Continental		Other		Total	
Club	Season	Division	Apps	Goals	Apps	Goals	Apps	Goals	Apps	Goals	Apps	Goals
Kolkheti-1913 Poti	2017	Erovnuli Liga	16	1	0	0	–		1 (Note: Appearances in the Erovnuli Liga Relegation play-offs)	0	17	1
Dila Gori	2018	Erovnuli Liga	20	0	2	0	–				22	0
Dila Gori	2019	Erovnuli Liga	31	0	0	0	–				31	0
Dila Gori	2020	Erovnuli Liga	14	0	2	0	–				16	0
Dila Gori	2021	Erovnuli Liga	31	0	2	0	1	0	–		34	0
Dila Gori	2022	Erovnuli Liga	32	0	3	0	2	0	–		37	0
Dila Gori	Total		128	0	9	0	3	0	-	-	140	0
Ararat-Armenia	2022–23	Armenian Premier League	14	1	0	0	0 (Note: Appearance in the UEFA Europa Conference League)	0	–		14	1
Ararat-Armenia	2023–24	Armenian Premier League	28	0	3	0	4	0	–		35	0
Ararat-Armenia	2024–25	Armenian Premier League	21	0	3	0	4	0	0 (Note: Appearances in the Armenian Supercup)	0	28	0
Ararat-Armenia	Total		63	1	6	0	8	0	0	0	77	1
Career total			207	2	15	0	11	0	1	0	234	2

=== International ===
As of matches played on 20 November 2023

Kenya national team
Year	Apps	Goals
2021	2	0
2022	0	0
2023	8	1
Total	10	1

=== International goals ===
Scores and results list Kenya's goal tally first.

No	Date	Venue	Opponent	Score	Result	Competition
1.	7 September 2023	Al Janoub Stadium, Al Wakrah, Qatar	Qatar	2–1	2–1	Friendly
