= Alwyn Tera =

Kenyan footballer (born 1997)

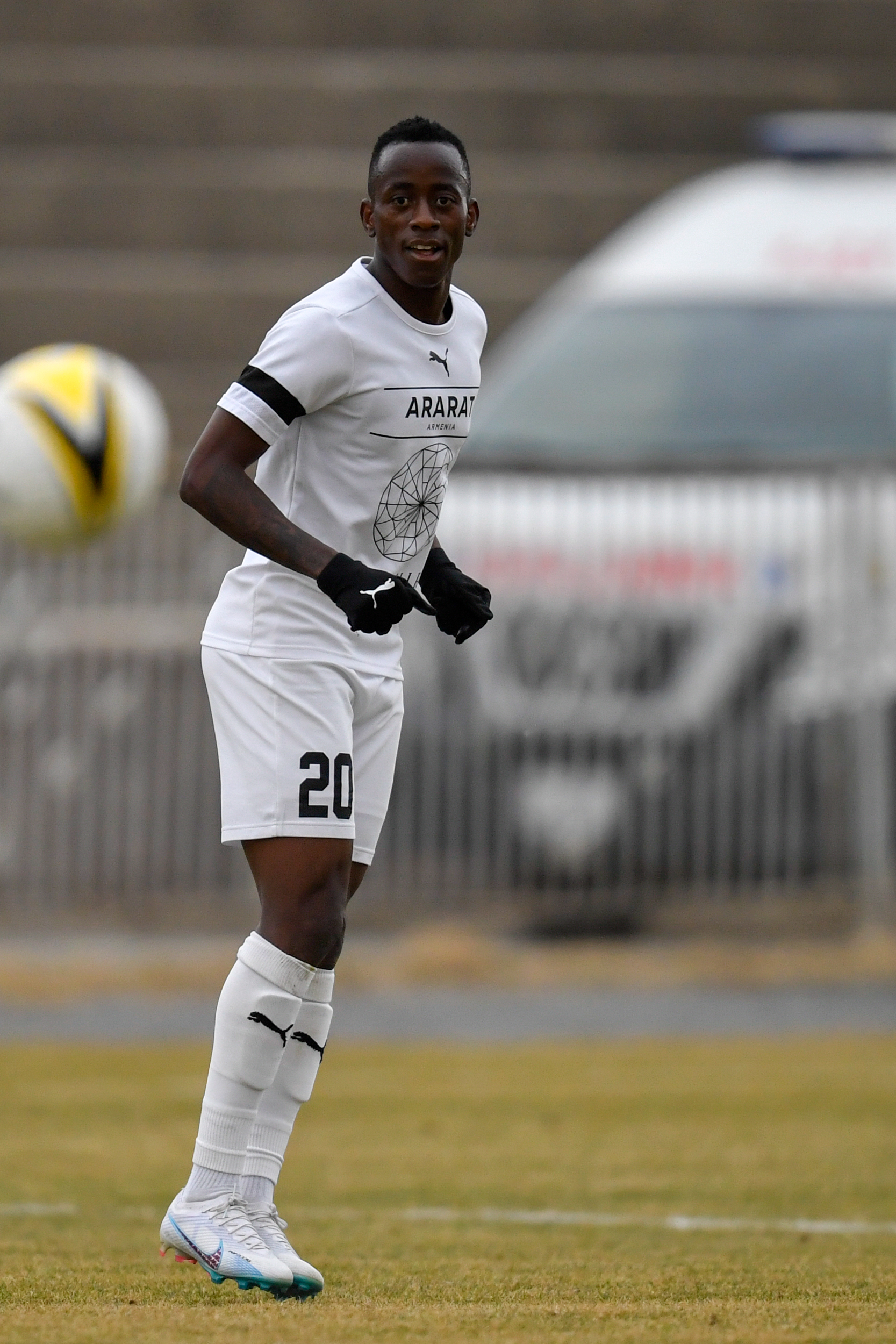

Personal information
- Full name: Alwyn Luheni Tera
- Date of birth: 18 January 1997 (age 29)
- Place of birth: Nairobi, Kenya
- Height: 1.77 m (5 ft 10 in)
- Position: Midfielder

Team information
- Current team: Ararat-Armenia
- Number: 20

Senior career*
Years	Team	Apps	(Gls)
2015–2021	Saburtalo Tbilisi	138	(9)
2021–	Ararat-Armenia	140	(8)

International career^{‡}
2021–	Kenya	2	(0)
- * Club domestic league appearances and goals as of 15 July 2026 ‡ National team caps and goals as of 7 November 2024

Alwyn Luheni Tera (born 18 January 1997) is a Kenyan professional footballer who plays as a midfielder for Armenian Premier League club Ararat-Armenia.

== Club career ==
On 9 July 2021, Tera joined Armenian Premier League club Ararat-Armenia after leaving Georgian club Saburtalo.

== International career ==
Tera made his debut for Kenya national football team on 11 November 2021 in a World Cup qualifier against Uganda.

== Career statistics ==
=== Club ===
As of match played 14 July 2026

Appearances and goals by club, season and competition
Club	Season	League			National Cup		Continental		Other		Total	
Club	Season	Division	Apps	Goals	Apps	Goals	Apps	Goals	Apps	Goals	Apps	Goals
Saburtalo Tbilisi	2015–16	Erovnuli Liga	15	0	0	0	–				15	0
Saburtalo Tbilisi	2016	Erovnuli Liga	13	1	0	0	–				13	1
Saburtalo Tbilisi	2017	Erovnuli Liga	27	2	0	0	–				27	2
Saburtalo Tbilisi	2018	Erovnuli Liga	26	1	0	0	–				26	1
Saburtalo Tbilisi	2019	Erovnuli Liga	22	0	4	0	4 (Note: Two appearances in the UEFA Champions League and two appearances in the UEFA Europa League)	0	1 (Note: Appearance in the Georgian Super Cup)	0	31	0
Saburtalo Tbilisi	2020	Erovnuli Liga	17	4	3	0	1 (Note: Appearance in the UEFA Europa League)	0	1	0	22	4
Saburtalo Tbilisi	2021	Erovnuli Liga	18	1	2	0	–				20	1
Saburtalo Tbilisi	Total		138	9	9	0	5	0	2	0	154	9
Ararat-Armenia	2021–22	Armenian Premier League	29	1	1	0	–				30	1
Ararat-Armenia	2022–23	Armenian Premier League	32	1	0	0	2 (Note: Appearances in the UEFA Conference League)	0	–		34	1
Ararat-Armenia	2023–24	Armenian Premier League	31	3	4	0	4	0	–		39	3
Ararat-Armenia	2024–25	Armenian Premier League	25	3	4	1	4	0	1 (Note: Appearances in the Armenian Supercup)	0	34	4
Ararat-Armenia	2025–26	Armenian Premier League	23	0	3	0	3	0	1	0	30	0
Ararat-Armenia	2026–27	Armenian Premier League	0	0	0	0	2 (Note: Appearances in the UEFA Champions League)	0	0	0	2	0
Ararat-Armenia	Total		140	8	12	1	12	0	2	0	169	9
Career total			278	17	21	1	17	0	4	0	323	18

== Honours ==
Ararat-Armenia

- Armenian Premier League: 2025–26
- Armenian Cup: 2023–24
- Armenian Supercup: 2024
