= Junior Bueno =

Colombian footballer (born 1996)

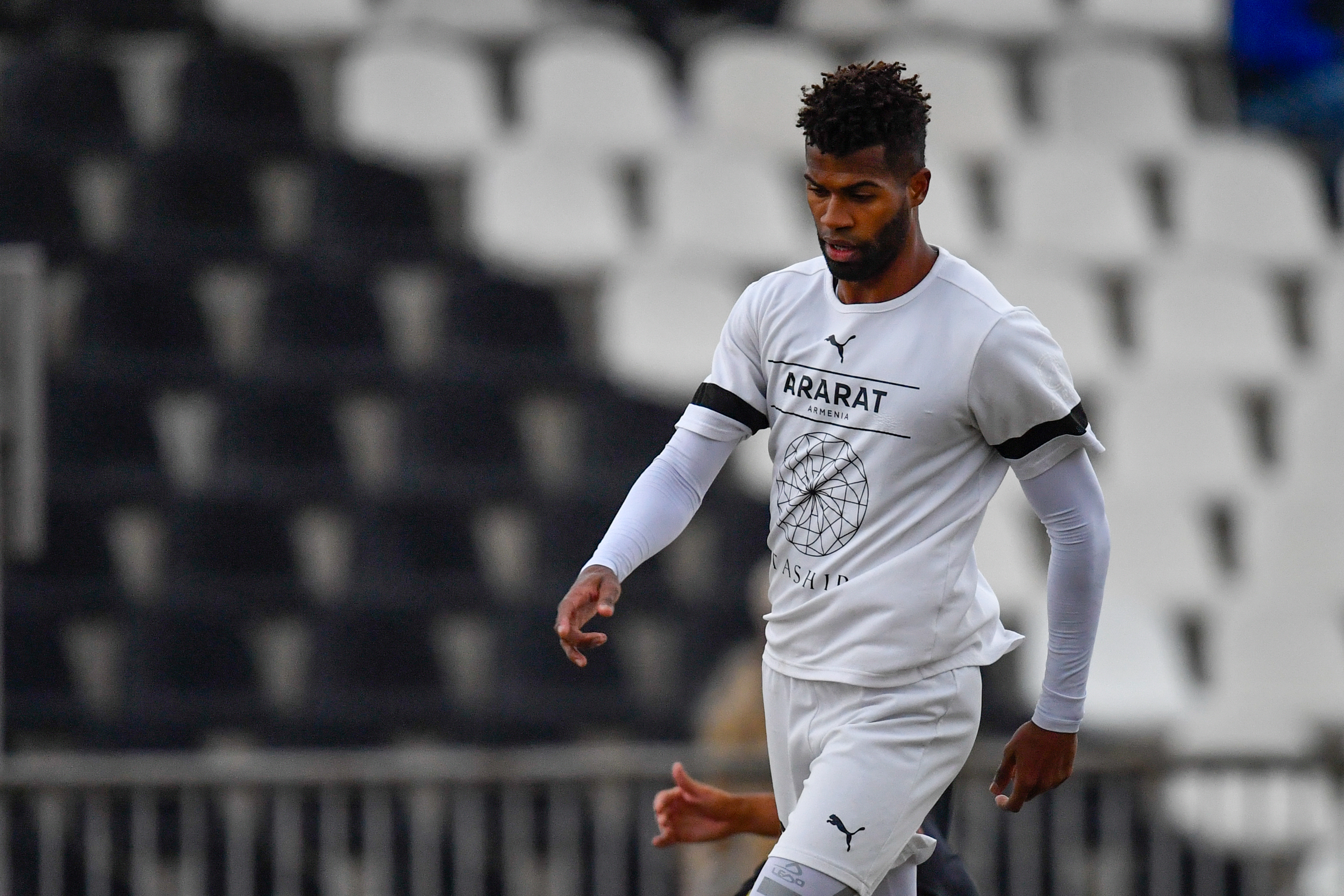

Personal information
- Full name: José Junior Julio Bueno
- Date of birth: 3 September 1996 (age 30)
- Place of birth: Riohacha, Colombia
- Height: 1.90 m (6 ft 3 in)
- Position: Centre-back

Team information
- Current team: Ararat-Armenia
- Number: 3

Youth career
- 2015–2017: Banfield

Senior career*
| Years | Team | Apps | (Gls) |
| 2017–2018 | Defensores de Belgrano | 27 | (0) |
| 2018–2019 | Gimnasia y Esgrima | 6 | (0) |
| 2019–2020 | Once Caldas | 20 | (1) |
| 2021– | Ararat-Armenia | 130 | (4) |

International career^{‡}
| 2026– | Armenia | 4 | (0) |
- * Club domestic league appearances and goals as of 22 September 2026 ‡ National team caps and goals as of 25 September 2026

José Junior Julio Bueno (Armenian: Խոսե Խունիոր Խուլիո Բուենո; born 3 September 1996) is a professional footballer who plays as a centre-back for Armenian Premier League club Ararat-Armenia. Born in Colombia, he represents the Armenia national team.

== Club career ==
Bueno joined Banfield's youth system in 2015. Two years later, Bueno was signed by Primera B Metropolitana side Defensores de Belgrano. He made his professional bow during a defeat away to Platense in September 2017. Defensores de Belgrano won promotion to Primera B Nacional at the conclusion of the 2017–18 campaign via the play-offs, though Bueno didn't feature in them. On 12 July 2018, Bueno moved to Gimnasia y Esgrima of the second tier. His first appearance came in the Copa Argentina later that month against Almagro. Bueno agreed a departure in June 2019 to Once Caldas of Categoría Primera A.

For Once Caldas, Bueno scored his first senior goal on 27 November 2020 during a 5–2 league defeat away to Millonarios. On 23 January 2021, Bueno completed a move to Armenian football with Premier League outfit Ararat-Armenia. He debuted in an Armenian Cup quarter-final first leg on 12 March at home to Van, a week prior to making his league bow against the same opponents away from home.

== International career ==
On 19 March 2026, Bueno was called up to the Armenia national team.

== Career statistics ==
=== Club ===
As of match played 20 September 2026.

Appearances and goals by club, season and competition
| Club | Season | League | | | National cup (Note: Includes Copa Argentina, Copa Colombia, Armenian Cup) | | Continental | | Other | | Total | |
| Club | Season | Division | Apps | Goals | Apps | Goals | Apps | Goals | Apps | Goals | Apps | Goals |
|---|---|---|---|---|---|---|---|---|---|---|---|---|
| Defensores de Belgrano | 2017–18 | Primera B Metropolitana | 27 | 0 | 0 | 0 | — | | 0 | 0 | 27 | 0 |
| Gimnasia y Esgrima | 2018–19 | Primera B Nacional | 6 | 0 | 1 | 0 | — | | 0 | 0 | 7 | 0 |
| Once Caldas | 2019 | Categoría Primera A | 2 | 0 | 0 | 0 | 0 | 0 | 0 | 0 | 2 | 0 |
| Once Caldas | 2020 | Categoría Primera A | 18 | 1 | 2 | 0 | 0 | 0 | 0 | 0 | 20 | 1 |
| Once Caldas | Total | | 20 | 1 | 2 | 0 | 0 | 0 | 0 | 0 | 22 | 1 |
| Ararat-Armenia | 2020–21 | Armenian Premier League | 9 | 1 | 4 | 0 | 0 | 0 | 0 | 0 | 13 | 1 |
| Ararat-Armenia | 2021–22 | Armenian Premier League | 22 | 0 | 1 | 0 | — | | — | | 23 | 0 |
| Ararat-Armenia | 2022–23 | Armenian Premier League | 23 | 0 | 1 | 0 | 2 (Note: Appearances in UEFA Conference League) | 0 | — | | 26 | 0 |
| Ararat-Armenia | 2023–24 | Armenian Premier League | 24 | 1 | 3 | 0 | 4 | 1 | — | | 31 | 2 |
| Ararat-Armenia | 2024–25 | Armenian Premier League | 22 | 0 | 5 | 0 | 4 | 0 | 1 (Note: Appearance in Armenian Super Cup) | 0 | 32 | 0 |
| Ararat-Armenia | 2025–26 | Armenian Premier League | 23 | 0 | 4 | 0 | 4 | 0 | 1 | 0 | 32 | 0 |
| Ararat-Armenia | 2026–27 | Armenian Premier League | 7 | 2 | 0 | 0 | 9 (Note: Six appearances in UEFA Champions League, three appearances in the UEFA Europa League) | 0 | 0 | 0 | 16 | 2 |
| Ararat-Armenia | Total | | 130 | 4 | 18 | 0 | 23 | 1 | 2 | 0 | 173 | 5 |
| Career total | | | 183 | 5 | 21 | 0 | 23 | 1 | 2 | 0 | 229 | 6 |

=== International ===
As of match played 25 September 2026

Appearances and goals by national team and year
| National team | Year | Apps | Goals |
|---|---|---|---|
| Armenia | 2026 | 4 | 0 |
| Total | | 4 | 0 |

== Honours ==
Ararat-Armenia

- Armenian Premier League: 2025–26
- Armenian Cup: 2023–24
- Armenian Supercup: 2024
