= Alexis Rodríguez (footballer) =

Argentinian footballer

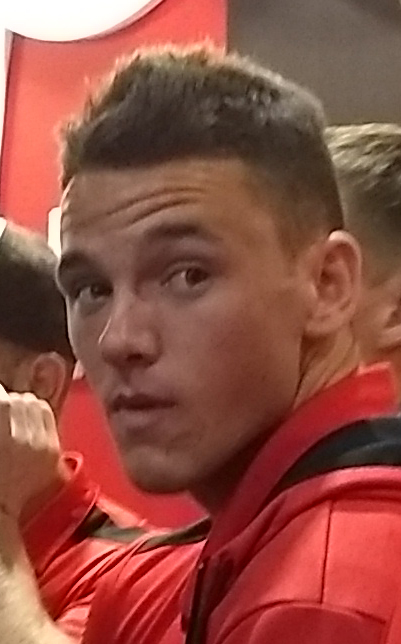
- Rodríguez with Newell's Old Boys in 2018

Personal information
- Full name: Alexis Agustín Rodríguez
- Date of birth: 21 March 1996 (age 30)
- Place of birth: Rosario, Argentina
- Height: 1.70 m (5 ft 7 in)
- Position: Left winger

Team information
- Current team: Atlético de Rafaela
- Number: 19

Youth career
- Newell's Old Boys

Senior career*
Years	Team	Apps	(Gls)
2017–2022	Newell's Old Boys	55	(7)
2021–2022	→ Deportivo Municipal (loan)	42	(13)
2023	Delfín	30	(5)
2024–2025	Ararat-Armenia	28	(8)
2025	Deportivo Cuenca	31	(5)
2026	Deportivo La Guaira	8	(2)
2026–	Atlético de Rafaela	12	(1)
- * Club domestic league appearances and goals as of 6 November 2026

Alexis Agustín Rodríguez (born 21 March 1996) is an Argentine professional footballer who plays as a left winger for Primera Nacional club Atlético de Rafaela.

== Career ==
Born in Rosario, Santa Fe, Rodríguez began in the youth team of hometown club Newell's Old Boys. He was promoted into the first-team when he was an unused substitute for an Argentine Primera División win over Olimpo on 27 May 2017.

Rodríguez's professional debut arrived on 26 November 2017 in a 3–1 win away to River Plate, as an 83rd-minute substitute for Brian Sarmiento. The following 5 May, he scored his first career goal in a 1–0 home win over Defensa y Justicia.

On 26 January 2024, Armenian Premier League club Ararat-Armenia announced the signing of Rodríguez. On 15 January 2025, Ararat-Armenia announced that Rodríguez had left the club after his contract was terminated by mutual agreement.

On 12 February 2025, Deportivo Cuenca announced the signing of Rodríguez for the 2025 season.

== Personal life ==
He is the twin brother of Denis Rodríguez and cousin of Maxi Rodríguez, both of whom were his teammates at Newell's.

== Career statistics ==
As of match played 30 November 2025.

Club statistics
Club	Season	League			Cup (Note: Includes Copa Argentina, Copa Bicentenario, Copa Ecuador and Armenian Cup.)		League Cup (Note: Includes Copa de la Liga Profesional)		Continental		Other		Total	
Club	Season	Division	Apps	Goals	Apps	Goals	Apps	Goals	Apps	Goals	Apps	Goals	Apps	Goals
Newell's Old Boys	2016–17	Liga Profesional de Fútbol	0	0	0	0	—		—		—		0	0
Newell's Old Boys	2017–18	Liga Profesional de Fútbol	8	1	1	1	—		2 (Note: Appearances and goals in the Copa Sudamericana)	0	—		11	2
Newell's Old Boys	2018–19	Liga Profesional de Fútbol	13	4	1	0	2	0	—		—		16	4
Newell's Old Boys	2019–20	Liga Profesional de Fútbol	18	1	0	0	0	0	—		—		18	1
Newell's Old Boys	2020–21	Liga Profesional de Fútbol	6	1	1	0	—		—		—		7	1
Newell's Old Boys	2021	Liga Profesional de Fútbol	10	0	0	0	—		4	1	—		14	1
Newell's Old Boys	2022	Liga Profesional de Fútbol	0	0	0	0	—		—		—		0	0
Newell's Old Boys	Total		55	7	3	1	2	0	6	1	0	0	66	9
Deportivo Municipal	2021	Liga 1	12	4			—		—		—		12	4
Deportivo Municipal	2022	Liga 1	30	9	—		—		—		—		30	9
Deportivo Municipal	Total		42	13			-	-	-	-	-	-	42	13
Delfín	2023	Serie A	30	5	—		—		1	0	—		31	5
Ararat-Armenia	2023–24	Armenian Premier League	13	4	3	1	—		0 (Note: Appearances and goals in the UEFA Europa Conference League)	0	—		16	5
Ararat-Armenia	2024–25	Armenian Premier League	15	4	0	0	—		4	0	—		19	4
Ararat-Armenia	Total		28	8	3	1	-	-	4	0	-	-	35	9
Cuenca	2025	Serie A	29	5	1	0	—		—		—		30	5
Total			184	38	7	2	2	0	11	1	0	0	197	41

== Honours ==
Ararat-Armenia

- Armenian Cup: 2023–24
