= Zhirayr Shaghoyan =

Armenian footballer

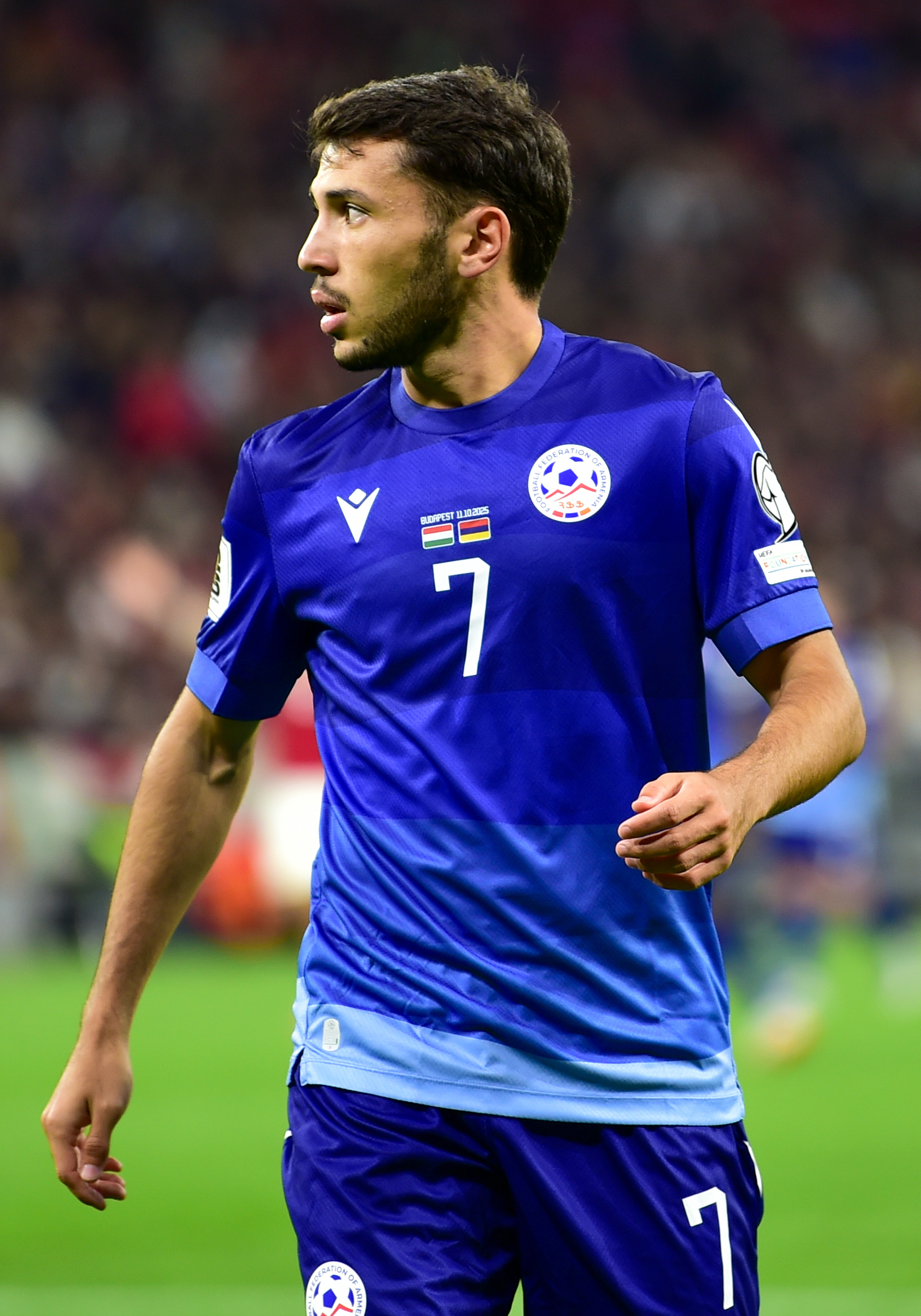
- Shaghoyan with Armenia in 2025

Personal information
- Date of birth: 10 April 2001 (age 25)
- Place of birth: Arinj, Kotayk, Armenia
- Height: 1.75 m (5 ft 9 in)
- Position: Winger

Team information
- Current team: Ararat-Armenia
- Number: 7

Youth career
- –2017: Pyunik

Senior career*
Years	Team	Apps	(Gls)
2017–	Ararat-Armenia	113	(23)
2019–2021	→ BKMA Yerevan (loan)	50	(53)
2022–2024	→ CSKA Sofia (loan)	23	(0)
2024–2025	→ Debrecen (loan)	10	(0)

International career^{‡}
2016–2017	Armenia U17	18	(6)
2018–2019	Armenia U19	20	(5)
2020–2022	Armenia U21	10	(1)
2021–	Armenia	28	(1)
- * Club domestic league appearances and goals as of 18 August 2026 ‡ National team caps and goals as of 15 November 2026

Zhirayr Shaghoyan (Armenian: Ժիրայր Շաղոյան; born 10 April 2001) is an Armenian professional footballer who plays as a winger for Ararat-Armenia and the Armenia national team.

== Club career ==
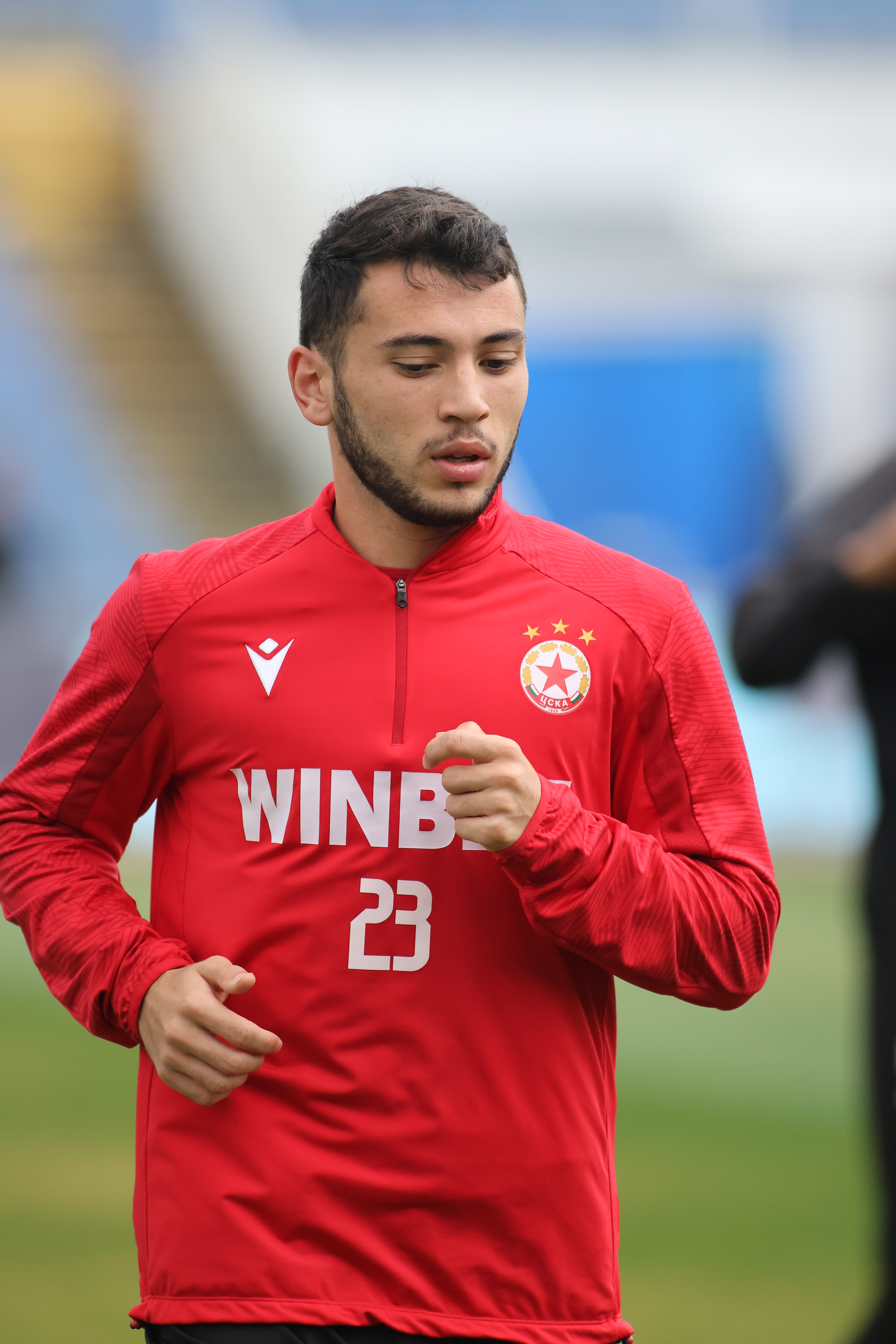
Shaghoyan with CSKA Sofia in 2023

On 6 September 2022, Shaghoyan signed for Bulgarian First League club CSKA Sofia on loan with an option to buy for the season from Ararat-Armenia.

== International career ==
Shaghoyan made his international debut for Armenia on 28 March 2021 in a 2022 FIFA World Cup qualification match against Iceland, which finished as a 2–0 home win.

== Career statistics ==
=== Club ===
As of match played 15 August 2026

Appearances and goals by club, season and competition
Club	Season	League			Cup		Europe		Other		Total	
Club	Season	Division	Apps	Goals	Apps	Goals	Apps	Goals	Apps	Goals	Apps	Goals
Ararat-Armenia	2017–18	Armenian Premier League	19	7	0	0	–		–		19	7
Ararat-Armenia	2018–19	Armenian Premier League	11	0	4	1	–		–		15	1
Ararat-Armenia	2019–20	Armenian Premier League	0	0	0	0	–		–		0	0
Ararat-Armenia	2020–21	Armenian Premier League	0	0	0	0	–		–		0	0
Ararat-Armenia	2021–22	Armenian Premier League	28	3	2	0	–		–		30	3
Ararat-Armenia	2022–23	Armenian Premier League	0	0	0	0	–		–		0	0
Ararat-Armenia	2023–24	Armenian Premier League	14	4	2	0	–		–		16	4
Ararat-Armenia	2024–25	Armenian Premier League	12	5	5	0	0	0	1	0	18	5
Ararat-Armenia	2025–26	Armenian Premier League	26	4	4	0	4	0	1	0	35	4
Ararat-Armenia	2026–27	Armenian Premier League	3	0	0	0	4	1	0	0	7	1
Ararat-Armenia	Total		113	23	17	1	8	1	2	0	140	25
BKMA Yerevan (loan)	2019–20	Armenian First League	20	21	0	0	–		–		20	21
BKMA Yerevan (loan)	2020–21	Armenian First League	24	27	4	1	–		–		28	28
BKMA Yerevan (loan)	2022–23	Armenian Premier League	6	5	0	0	–		–		6	5
BKMA Yerevan (loan)	Total		50	53	4	1	0	0	0	0	54	54
CSKA Sofia (loan)	2022–23	Bulgarian First League	15	0	1	0	0	0	–		16	0
CSKA Sofia (loan)	2023–24	Bulgarian First League	8	0	0	0	2	0	–		10	0
CSKA Sofia (loan)	Total		23	0	1	0	2	0	0	0	26	0
Debrecen (loan)	2024–25	Nemzeti Bajnokság I	10	0	1	0	0	0	–		11	0
Career total			196	76	23	2	10	1	2	0	231	79

=== International ===
As of 15 November 2026

Armenia
Year	Apps	Goals
2021	6	0
2022	4	1
2023	1	0
2024	4	0
2025	8	0
2026	5	0
Total	28	1

Scores and results list Armenia's goal tally first.

List of international goals scored by Zhirayr Shaghoyan
No.	Date	Venue	Opponent	Score	Result	Competition
1.	16 November 2022	Fadil Vokrri Stadium, Pristina, Kosovo	Kosovo	1–0	2–2	Friendly

== Honours ==
Ararat-Armenia

- Armenian Premier League: 2025–26
- Armenian Cup: 2023–24
- Armenian Supercup: 2024
