= Armen Ambartsumyan (footballer, born 1994) =

Armenian-Russian footballer

Personal information
- Full name: Armen Garikovich Ambartsumyan
- Date of birth: 11 April 1994 (age 32)
- Place of birth: Saratov, Russia
- Height: 1.77 m (5 ft 9 1/2 in)
- Positions: Forward; midfielder

Team information
- Current team: Ararat-Armenia
- Number: 10

Youth career
- Konoplyov football academy

Senior career*
Years	Team	Apps	(Gls)
2010–2016	CSKA Moscow	0	(0)
2014–2015	→ Zenit Penza (loan)	24	(1)
2015–2016	→ Torpedo Armavir (loan)	21	(1)
2016–2017	Mordovia Saransk	30	(0)
2017–2018	Fakel Voronezh	29	(1)
2018–	Ararat-Armenia	200	(17)

International career
2009–2010	Russia U16	13	(3)
2010–2011	Russia U17	12	(2)
2012	Russia U18	3	(0)
2012–2013	Russia U19	12	(0)
2013–2015	Russia U21	7	(0)
- * Club domestic league appearances and goals as of 2 November 2026

Armen Garikovich Ambartsumyan (Russian: Армен Гарикович Амбарцумян; Armenian: Արմեն Համբարձումյան; born 11 April 1994) is a Russian-Armenian football player who currently plays for Ararat-Armenia.

== Career ==
=== Club ===
Ambartsumyan made his professional debut in the Russian Professional Football League for FC Zenit Penza on 25 July 2014 in a game against FC Podolye Podolsky district.

He made his Russian Football National League debut for FC Torpedo Armavir on 12 July 2015 in a game against FC Zenit-2 Saint Petersburg.

On 23 June 2016, Ambartsumyan left CSKA Moscow to sign for Mordovia Saransk.

=== International ===
After representing Russia throughout junior levels, Ambartsumyan was called up to the senior Armenia national football team in 2017.

== Career statistics ==
As of match played 1 November 2026

Appearances and goals by club, season and competition
Club	Season	League			National cup (Note: Includes Russian Cup, Armenian Cup)		Continental		Other		Total	
Club	Season	Division	Apps	Goals	Apps	Goals	Apps	Goals	Apps	Goals	Apps	Goals
CSKA Moscow	2010	Russian Premier League	0	0	0	0	0	0	0	0	0	0
CSKA Moscow	2011–12	Russian Premier League	0	0	0	0	0	0	0	0	0	0
CSKA Moscow	2012–13	Russian Premier League	0	0	0	0	0	0	–		0	0
CSKA Moscow	2013–14	Russian Premier League	0	0	1	0	0	0	0	0	1	0
CSKA Moscow	2014–15	Russian Premier League	0	0	0	0	0	0	0	0	0	0
CSKA Moscow	2015–16	Russian Premier League	0	0	0	0	0	0	–		0	0
CSKA Moscow	Total		0	0	1	0	0	0	0	0	1	0
Zenit Penza (loan)	2014–15	Russian Professional Football League	24	1	1	0	–		–		25	1
Torpedo Armavir (loan)	2015–16	Russian Football National League	21	1	1	0	–		–		22	1
Mordovia Saransk	2016–17	Russian Football National League	30	0	2	0	–		–		32	0
Fakel Voronezh	2017–18	Russian Football National League	29	1	1	0	–		–		30	1
Ararat-Armenia	2018–19	Armenian Premier League	23	0	6	0	–		–		29	0
Ararat-Armenia	2019–20	Armenian Premier League	16	3	4	0	6 (Note: Two appearances in UEFA Champions League, four appearances in UEFA Europa League)	0	1 (Note: Appearance in Armenian Supercup)	0	27	3
Ararat-Armenia	2020–21	Armenian Premier League	22	0	4	0	4 (Note: One appearance in UEFA Champions League, three appearances in UEFA Europa League)	0	1	0	31	0
Ararat-Armenia	2021–22	Armenian Premier League	19	2	2	0	–		–		21	2
Ararat-Armenia	2022–23	Armenian Premier League	30	3	2	0	1 (Note: Appearance(s) in UEFA Conference League)	0	–		33	3
Ararat-Armenia	2023–24	Armenian Premier League	31	1	4	0	4	0	–		39	1
Ararat-Armenia	2024–25	Armenian Premier League	29	6	5	0	4	0	1	0	39	6
Ararat-Armenia	2025–26	Armenian Premier League	23	2	3	0	1	0	1	0	29	2
Ararat-Armenia	2026–27	Armenian Premier League	7	0	1	0	4 (Note: Two appearances in UEFA Champions League, three appearances in UEFA Europa League)	0	0	0	12	0
Ararat-Armenia	Total		200	17	31	0	24	0	4	0	259	17
Career total			304	19	37	0	24	0	4	0	369	20

== Honours ==
Ararat-Armenia

- Armenian Premier League: 2018–19, 2019–20, 2025–26
- Armenian Cup: 2023–24
- Armenian Supercup: 2019, 2024
