= Cássio Scheid =

Brazilian footballer (born 1994)

Personal information
- Full name: Cássio Fernando Scheid
- Date of birth: 3 January 1994 (age 32)
- Place of birth: Arroio do Meio, Brazil
- Height: 1.87 m (6 ft 2 in)
- Position: Centre-back

Team information
- Current team: Leça
- Number: 41

Youth career
- 2008–2011: Santo André
- 2011–2014: Juventus-SP

Senior career*
Years	Team	Apps	(Gls)
2014–2015	Juventus-SP	5	(0)
2016	São Carlos	24	(5)
2016–2021	Farense	112	(4)
2021–2022	Varzim	32	(1)
2022–2023	BG Pathum United	18	(0)
2023–2024	Ararat-Armenia	23	(0)
2024	Malut United	14	(1)
2025	SHB Da Nang	10	(1)
2025–2026	Dewa United	11	(0)
2026–	Leça	3	(0)
- * Club domestic league appearances and goals as of 12 September 2026

Cássio Fernando Scheid (born 3 January 1994) is a Brazilian professional footballer who plays as a centre-back for Liga 3 club Leça.

== Professional career ==
Scheid began his career in the amateur division of Brazil, before joining Farense in 2016. Scheid made his professional debut with Farense in a 0-0 Taça da Liga penalty shootout win over Penafiel on 21 July 2018. Scheid captained Farense as they were promoted into the Primeira Liga at the end of the 2019-20 season.

On 2 July 2023, Ararat-Armenia announced the signing of Scheid from BG Pathum United.

== Career statistics ==
=== Club ===
As of match played 1 February 2026

Appearances and goals by club, season and competition
Club	Season	League			National Cup		League Cup		Continental		Other		Total	
Club	Season	Division	Apps	Goals	Apps	Goals	Apps	Goals	Apps	Goals	Apps	Goals	Apps	Goals
Farense	2016–17	Campeonato de Portugal	30	0	0	0	—		—		—		30	0
Farense	2017–18	Campeonato de Portugal	27	1	2	0	—		—		—		29	1
Farense	2018–19	LigaPro	32	1	0	0	2	0	—		—		34	1
Farense	2019–20	LigaPro	12	2	1	0	1	0	—		—		14	2
Farense	2020–21	Primeira Liga	11	0	0	0	0	0	—		—		11	0
Farense	Total		112	4	3	0	3	0	—		—		118	5
Varzim	2021–22	Liga Portugal 2	32	1	2	0	1	0	—		—		35	0
BG Pathum United	2022–23	Thai League 1	18	0	2	1	3	0	—		1 (Note: Appearances and goals in the Thailand Champions Cup)	0	24	1
Ararat-Armenia	2023–24	Armenian Premier League	23	0	1	0	—		4 (Note: Appearances and goals in the UEFA Europa Conference League)	0	—		28	0
Malut United	2024–25	Liga 1	14	1	0	0	—		—		—		14	1
SHB Đà Nẵng	2024–25	V.League 1	10	1	—		—		—		0	0	10	1
Dewa United	2025–26	Super League	11	0	0	0	—		1 (Note: Appearances in AFC Challenge League)	0	—		12	0
Career total			220	7	8	1	7	0	5	0	1	0	241	8

== Honours ==
=== Club ===
BG Pathum United

- Thailand Champions Cup: 2022
- Thai League Cup runners-up: 2022–23
