= Mohamed Yattara =

Guinean footballer

Personal information
- Full name: Mohamed Lamine Yattara
- Date of birth: 28 July 1993 (age 33)
- Place of birth: Conakry, Guinea
- Height: 1.84 m (6 ft 0 in)
- Positions: Striker; attacking midfielder

Senior career*
Years	Team	Apps	(Gls)
2010–2013	Lyon B	28	(5)
2010–2015	Lyon	21	(1)
2012	→ Arles-Avignon (loan)	19	(5)
2012–2013	→ Troyes (loan)	23	(3)
2013	→ Troyes B (loan)	1	(0)
2013–2014	→ Angers (loan)	30	(11)
2015–2017	Standard Liège	12	(1)
2016	→ Angers (loan)	19	(2)
2017	→ Auxerre (loan)	17	(4)
2017–2020	Auxerre	61	(17)
2020–2021	Sichuan Jiuniu	15	(3)
2022–2023	Pau	20	(1)
2023–2024	Ararat-Armenia	28	(18)
2024–2025	Al Dhafra		
2025–2026	Zakho		
2026	Dibba Al-Hisn		

International career^{‡}
2012–	Guinea	38	(12)
- * Club domestic league appearances and goals as of 15:55, 9 December 2025 (UTC) ‡ National team caps and goals as of 08:14, 12 September 2026 (UTC)

Mohamed Lamine Yattara (born 28 July 1993) is a Guinean professional footballer who last played for the Guinea national team as a striker.

== Early and personal life ==
He is brothers of Ibrahim Yattara and Naby Yattara.

== Club career ==
Born in Conakry, Yattara has played club football for Lyon, Arles-Avignon and Troyes. He signed a new two-year contract with Lyon in July 2014.

On 17 July 2015, Yattara was bought by Belgian side Standard Liège for €2 million with a possible future share of profits made from Yattara's sale.

Yattara joined AJ Auxerre on loan in January 2017 for the remainder of the season.

He left Chinese club Sichuan Jiuniu in December 2021.

In August 2022 he signed for Pau FC.

On 14 August 2023, Ararat-Armenia announced the signing of Yattara from Pau. On 3 June 2024, Ararat-Armenia announced that Yattara had left the club after his contract expired.

On 4 August 2025, Iraq Stars League club Zakho SC announced the signing of Yattara. On 7 January 2026, Zakho announced the departure of Yattara from the club.

== International career ==
He made his international debut for Guinea in 2012 and was included in the nation's squad for the 2015 Africa Cup of Nations. In team's opening match, Yattara scored the opening goal as Guinea drew 1–1 with the Ivory Coast. In April 2015, he spoke about the bright future of Guinea in international football.

== Career statistics ==
=== Club ===
As of match played 5 April 2025

Appearances and goals by club, season and competition
Club	Season	League			National Cup		League Cup		Continental		Other		Total	
Club	Season	Division	Apps	Goals	Apps	Goals	Apps	Goals	Apps	Goals	Apps	Goals	Apps	Goals
Lyon B	2010–11	Championnat de France amateur	18	3	—		—		—		—		18	3
Lyon B	2011–12	Championnat de France amateur	10	2	—		—		—		—		10	2
Lyon B	Total		28	5	—		—		—		—		28	5
Lyon	2014–15	Ligue 1	21	1	0	0	0	0	2	2	—		23	3
Arles-Avignon (loan)	2011–12	Ligue 2	19	5	0	0	0	0	—		—		19	5
Troyes (loan)	2012–13	Ligue 1	23	3	4	0	3	1	—		—		30	4
Troyes B (loan)	2012–13	Championnat National 3	1	0	—		—		—		—		1	0
Angers (loan)	2013–14	Ligue 2	30	11	4	3	0	0	—		—		34	14
Standard Liège	2015–16	Belgian Pro League	12	1	0	0	—		4	0	—		16	1
Standard Liège	2016–17	Belgian Pro League	0	0	0	0	—		0	0	1 (Note: Appearances in Belgian Super Cup)	0	1	0
Standard Liège	Total		12	1	0	0	—		4	0	1	0	17	1
Angers (loan)	2015–16	Ligue 1	19	2	1	0	0	0	—		—		20	2
Auxerre (loan)	2016–17	Ligue 2	17	4	2	1	0	0	—		—		19	5
Auxerre	2017–18	Ligue 2	24	10	1	0	0	0	—		—		25	10
Auxerre	2018–19	Ligue 2	26	4	0	0	1	0	—		—		27	4
Auxerre	2019–20	Ligue 2	11	3	1	0	0	0	—		—		12	3
Auxerre	Total		61	17	2	0	1	0	—		—		64	17
Sichuan Jiuniu	2020	China League One	10	3	—		—		—		—		10	3
Sichuan Jiuniu	2021	China League One	5	0	0	0	—		—		—		5	0
Sichuan Jiuniu	Total		15	3	0	0	—		—		—		15	3
Pau	2022–23	Ligue 2	20	1	4	0	0	0	—		—		24	1
Pau II	2022–23	Championnat National 3	2	1	—		—		—		—		2	1
Ararat-Armenia	2023–24	Armenian Premier League	28	18	2	0	—		0	0	—		30	18
Al Dhafra	2024–25	UAE First Division League	20	15	0	0	—		—		—		20	15
Career total			316	87	19	4	4	1	6	2	1	0	346	94

=== International ===
As of matches played on 14 July 2019

Guinea national team
Year	Apps	Goals
2012	3	1
2013	5	3
2014	4	2
2015	9	2
2016	4	1
2017	0	0
2018	2	1
2019	6	2
Total	33	12

=== International goals ===
Scores and results list Guinea's goal tally first.

No	Date	Venue	Opponent	Score	Result	Competition
1.	9 September 2012	Stade du 28 Septembre, Conakry, Guinea	Niger	1–0	1–0	2013 Africa Cup of Nations qualification
2.	9 June 2013	Stade du 28 Septembre, Conakry, Guinea	Mozambique	1–0	6–1	2014 FIFA World Cup qualification
3.	9 June 2013	Stade du 28 Septembre, Conakry, Guinea	Mozambique	6–1	6–1	2014 FIFA World Cup qualification
4.	16 June 2013	Stade du 28 Septembre, Conakry, Guinea	Zimbabwe	1–0	1–0	2014 FIFA World Cup qualification
5.	25 May 2014	Stade Olympique Yves-du-Manoir, Paris, France	Mali	2–1	2–1	Friendly
6.	15 October 2014	Accra Sports Stadium, Accra, Ghana	Ghana	1–1	1–3	2015 Africa Cup of Nations qualification
7.	20 January 2015	Estadio de Malabo, Malabo, Equatorial Guinea	Ivory Coast	1–0	1–1	2015 Africa Cup of Nations
8.	12 October 2015	Stade Adrar, Agadir, Morocco	Morocco	1–0	1–1	Friendly
9.	29 March 2016	Kamuzu Stadium, Blantyre, Malawi	Malawi	1–1	2–1	2017 Africa Cup of Nations qualification
10.	18 November 2018	Stade du 28 Septembre, Conakry, Guinea	Ivory Coast	1–0	1–1	2019 Africa Cup of Nations qualification
11.	30 June 2019	Al Salam Stadium, Cairo, Egypt	Burundi	1–0	2–0	2019 Africa Cup of Nations
12.	30 June 2019	Al Salam Stadium, Cairo, Egypt	Burundi	2–0	2–0	2019 Africa Cup of Nations
