= Adriano Castanheira =

Portuguese footballer

Personal information
- Full name: Adriano Duarte Castanheira
- Date of birth: 7 April 1993 (age 33)
- Place of birth: Neuchâtel, Switzerland
- Height: 1.78 m (5 ft 10 in)
- Positions: Attacking midfielder; winger

Team information
- Current team: Sreenidi Deccan

Youth career
- 2005–2009: Covilhã
- 2009–2012: Porto
- 2010–2011: → Nacional (loan)

Senior career*
Years	Team	Apps	(Gls)
2012–2016	Covilhã	68	(1)
2015–2016	→ Benfica Castelo Branco (loan)	30	(4)
2016–2017	Benfica Castelo Branco	31	(9)
2017–2018	União Leiria	28	(7)
2018–2019	Covilhã	47	(13)
2020–2023	Paços Ferreira	34	(1)
2021–2022	→ Chaves (loan)	26	(4)
2022–2023	→ Penafiel (loan)	28	(1)
2023–2024	Ararat-Armenia	29	(3)
2024–2025	Malut United	33	(2)
2025–2026	Persis Solo	11	(0)
2026	→ Persikad Depok (loan)	9	(2)
2026–	Sreenidi Deccan	0	(0)
- * Club domestic league appearances and goals as of 2 May 2026

Adriano Duarte Castanheira (born 7 April 1993) is a Portuguese professional footballer who plays as an attacking midfielder or winger for Indian Football League club Sreenidi Deccan.

== Club career ==
Born in Neuchâtel, Switzerland to Portuguese parents, Castanheira finished his youth career with Porto. He spent the better part of his first four seasons as a senior with Covilhã of the Segunda Liga, making his debut in the competition on 26 August 2012 in a 0–1 home loss against Penafiel where he came on as a late substitute.

Ahead of the 2016–17 campaign, Castanheira returned to the third division and Sport Benfica e Castelo Branco, whom he had already represented on loan. In the summer of 2017, he signed with Leiria of the same league.

On 8 June 2018, Castanheira re-joined Covilhã. He scored seven goals in 34 matches in the first year in his second spell, helping to a final sixth position in the second tier.

Castanheira agreed to a two-and-a-half-year contract with Paços de Ferreira on 19 December 2019. His maiden appearance in the Primeira Liga took place on 5 January 2020, when he played the entire 1–0 home victory over Moreirense. His only goal came on 1 March, from a penalty kick to close the 3–1 away defeat of bottom-placed Aves.

On 11 August 2021, Castanheira was loaned to second-division club Chaves. Another temporary deal was arranged for him in that league in 2022–23, at Penafiel.

Castanheira spent the following two seasons abroad, with Ararat-Armenia in the Armenian Premier League and Malut United in the Indonesian Super League. He won the 2023–24 domestic cup with the former.
