= Damjan Shishkovski =

Macedonian footballer (born 1995)

Personal information
- Full name: Damjan Shishkovski; Дамјан Шишковски
- Date of birth: 18 March 1995 (age 31)
- Place of birth: Skopje, Macedonia
- Height: 1.95 m (6 ft 5 in)
- Position: Goalkeeper

Team information
- Current team: Borac Banja Luka
- Number: 1

Senior career*
Years	Team	Apps	(Gls)
2010–2018	Rabotnički	75	(0)
2015	→ Gent (loan)	0	(0)
2018	Lahti	15	(0)
2019	RoPS	5	(0)
2019–2020	Rabotnički	23	(0)
2020–2024	Doxa	120	(0)
2024	Ararat-Armenia	8	(0)
2024–	Borac Banja Luka	19	(0)

International career^{‡}
2012	Macedonia U17	9	(0)
2012–2014	Macedonia U19	1	(0)
2014–2017	Macedonia U21	7	(0)
2020–	North Macedonia	12	(0)
- * Club domestic league appearances and goals as of 30 August 2026 ‡ National team caps and goals as of 29 May 2026

Damjan Shishkovski (Macedonian: Дамјан Шишковски; born 18 March 1995) is a Macedonian professional footballer who plays as a goalkeeper for Bosnian Premier League club Borac Banja Luka and North Macedonia national football team.

== Career statistics ==
=== Club ===
As of 30 August 2026

Appearances and goals by club, season and competition
Club	Season	League			Cup (Note: Includes Macedonian Cup, Suomen Cup and Armenian Independence Cup, Bosnian Cup)		Continental		Other		Total	
Club	Season	Division	Apps	Goals	Apps	Goals	Apps	Goals	Apps	Goals	Apps	Goals
Rabotnički	2010–11	Macedonian First League	1	0	0	0	–		–		1	0
Rabotnički	2011–12	Macedonian First League	5	0	2	0	1 (Note: Appearance(s) in UEFA Europa League)	0	–		8	0
Rabotnički	2012–13	Macedonian First League	11	0	0	0	–		–		11	0
Rabotnički	2013–14	Macedonian First League	1	0	0	0	–		–		1	0
Rabotnički	2014–15	Macedonian First League	10	0	2	0	2 (Note: Appearances in UEFA Champions League)	0	–		14	0
Rabotnički	2015–16	Macedonian First League	15	0	5	0	1	0	1 (Note: Appearance in Macedonian Supercup)	0	22	0
Rabotnički	2016–17	Macedonian First League	23	0	0	0	2	0	–		25	0
Rabotnički	2017–18	Macedonian First League	9	0	0	0	4	0	–		13	0
Rabotnički	Total		75	0	9	0	10	0	1	0	95	0
Gent (loan)	2014–15	Belgian First Division A	0	0	0	0	–		–		0	0
Lahti	2018	Veikkausliiga	15	0	4	0	1	0	–		20	0
RoPS	2019	Veikkausliiga	5	0	6	0	0	0	–		11	0
Rabotnički	2019–20	Macedonian First League	23	0	0	0	–		–		23	0
Doxa	2020–21	Cypriot First Division	35	0	0	0	–		–		35	0
Doxa	2021–22	Cypriot First Division	30	0	0	0	–		–		30	0
Doxa	2022–23	Cypriot First Division	40	0	0	0	–		–		40	0
Doxa	2023–24	Cypriot First Division	15	0	0	0	–		–		15	0
Doxa	Total		120	0	0	0	0	0	0	0	120	0
Ararat-Armenia	2023–24	Armenian Premier League	8	0	1	0	–		–		9	0
Borac Banja Luka	2024–25	Bosnian Premier League	13	0	3	0	7 (Note: Four appearances in UEFA Champions League; two appearances in UEFA Europa League; one appearance in UEFA Conference League)	0	–		23	0
Borac Banja Luka	2025–26	Bosnian Premier League	3	0	1	0	1 (Note: Appearance in UEFA Conference League)	0	–		5	0
Borac Banja Luka	2026–27	Bosnian Premier League	3	0	0	0	0	0	–		3	0
Borac Banja Luka	Total		19	0	4	0	8	0	–		31	0
Career total			265	0	24	0	19	0	1	0	309	0

=== International ===
As of match played 29 May 2026

North Macedonia
Year	Apps	Goals
2020	6	0
2021	0	0
2022	2	0
2023	3	0
2026	1	0
Total	12	0
