= Nikolai Kipiani =

Russian footballer

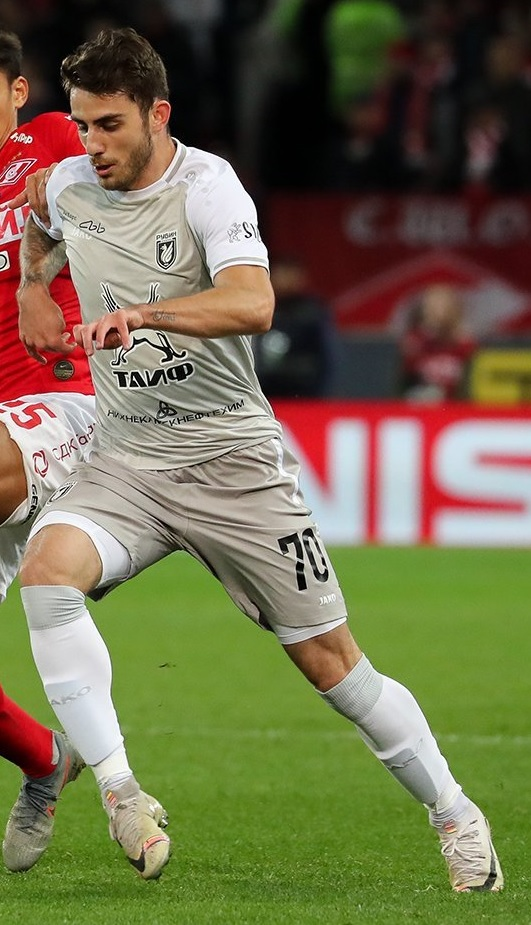
- Kipiani with Rubin Kazan in 2019

Personal information
- Full name: Nikolai Zurabovich Kipiani
- Date of birth: 25 January 1997 (age 29)
- Place of birth: Tbilisi, Georgia
- Height: 1.78 m (5 ft 10 in)
- Position: Forward

Team information
- Current team: Telavi
- Number: 10

Youth career
- Lokomotiv Moscow

Senior career*
Years	Team	Apps	(Gls)
2016–2018	Ethnikos Achna	49	(10)
2018–2019	Omonia	13	(1)
2018–2019	→ Ermis Aradippou (loan)	12	(0)
2019	Rustavi	13	(3)
2019–2020	Rubin Kazan	3	(0)
2020	→ Rotor Volgograd (loan)	0	(0)
2020–2022	Rotor Volgograd	38	(3)
2023	Telavi	15	(1)
2023	Dinamo Batumi	0	(0)
2023–2024	Ararat-Armenia	20	(1)
2024–	Telavi	23	(1)

International career^{‡}
2012	Russia U-15	4	(0)
2012–2013	Russia U-16	7	(1)
2013–2014	Russia U-17	9	(1)
2014–2015	Russia U-18	8	(4)
2015–2016	Russia U-19	10	(0)
- * Club domestic league appearances and goals as of 8 December 2025 ‡ National team caps and goals as of 29 March 2016

Nikolai Zurabovich Kipiani (Russian: Николай Зурабович Кипиани; born 25 January 1997) is a Russian football player of Georgian descent who plays as forward for Georgian club Telavi.

== Club career ==
A distant relative of Soviet footballer David Kipiani, he started playing football at Rinat Dasayev's academy in Moscow.

On 25 July 2019, he signed a one-year contract with Russian Premier League club Rubin Kazan. On 11 February 2020, he joined Rotor Volgograd on loan until the end of the 2019–20 season. On 21 June 2020, he re-signed with Rotor on a permanent basis.

On 6 September 2023, Armenian Premier League club Ararat-Armenia announced the signing of Kipiani from Dinamo Batumi.

== Club statistics ==
As of match played 22 December 2018

Club	Season	League		Cup		Total	
Club	Season	Apps	Goals	Apps	Goals	Apps	Goals
Ethnikos
Ethnikos	2016–17	32	6	2	0	34	6
Ethnikos	2017–18	17	4	1	0	18	4
Ethnikos	Total	49	10	3	0	52	10
Omonia
Omonia	2017–18	13	1	1	0	14	1
Ermis Aradippou
Ermis Aradippou	2018–19	12	0	0	0	12	0
Career total		74	11	4	0	78	11

== Achievements ==
=== Teams ===
FC Rotor

- Winner of the Russian First Football League: 2019/2020

FC Ararat-Armenia

- Armenian Cup winner: 2023/24
