= 2023–24 FC Noah season =

Noah
2023–24 season
- CEO: Artur Sahakyan
- Manager: Robert Arzumanyan (until 29 September); Carlos Inarejos (from 29 September)
- Stadium: Armavir City Stadium
- Premier League: 2nd
- Armenian Cup: Quarterfinal
- Top goalscorer: League: Artur Miranyan (23); All: Artur Miranyan (23)
| Home colours | Away colours | Third colours |

The 2023–24 season was FC Noah's 6th season in Armenian Premier League.

== Season events ==
On 14 September, Noah announced the signing of Gor Manvelyan from Nantes.

On 29 September, Noah announced the departure of Robert Arzumanyan as head coach and the appointment of Carlos Inarejos as his replacement.

On 15 January, Noah announced the signing of Ognjen Čančarević following his release from Alashkert.

On 30 January, Noah announced the signing of free-agent Pablo Santos who'd last played for Al Raed.

On 1 February, Noah announced the signing of free-agent Alfred N'Diaye who'd last played for Málaga.

On 15 February, Noah announced the signing of Logan Rogerson from Haka.

On 29 February, Noah announced the signing of Virgile Pinson, who'd previously played for Botoșani.

== Squad ==
As of match played 25 May 2024

| Number | Name | Nationality | Position | Date of birth (age) | Signed from | Signed in | Contract ends | Apps. | Goals |
Goalkeepers
| 22 | Ognjen Čančarević | (Armenia) | GK | 25 September 1989 (aged 34) | Alashkert | 2024 | | 15 | 0 |
| 77 | Valerio Vimercati | (Italy) | GK | 28 July 1997 (aged 26) | Unattached | 2023 | | 64 | 0 |
| 99 | Harutyun Melkonyan | (Armenia) | GK | 28 June 2001 (aged 22) | on loan from Pyunik | 2022 | | 6 | 0 |
Defenders
| 3 | Sergey Muradyan | (Armenia) | DF | 27 August 2004 (aged 19) | Zenit St.Petersburg | 2023 | | 39 | 1 |
| 4 | Pedro Farrim | (Portugal) | DF | 6 January 2000 (aged 24) | Real | 2023 | | 6 | 0 |
| 5 | Jordy Tutuarima | (Netherlands) | DF | 28 April 1993 (aged 31) | PEC Zwolle | 2023 | | 33 | 0 |
| 19 | Vaspurak Minasyan | (Armenia) | DF | 29 June 1994 (aged 29) | Van | 2023 | | 22 | 0 |
| 26 | Aleksandar Miljković | (Serbia) | DF | 26 February 1990 (aged 34) | Pyunik | 2023 | | 33 | 2 |
| 28 | Pablo Santos | (Brazil) | DF | 18 March 1992 (aged 32) | Unattached | 2024 | | 6 | 2 |
| 31 | Hovhannes Hambardzumyan | (Armenia) | DF | 4 October 1990 (aged 33) | Anorthosis Famagusta | 2023 | | 28 | 1 |
| 55 | David Malembana | (Mozambique) | DF | 11 October 1995 (aged 28) | Lokomotiv 1929 Sofia | 2023 | | 18 | 0 |
| 71 | Artur Danielyan | (Armenia) | DF | 9 February 1998 (aged 26) | Panserraikos | 2022 | | 31 | 0 |
Midfielders
| 6 | Martim Maia | (Portugal) | MF | 24 May 1998 (aged 26) | Santa Clara | 2023 | | 35 | 1 |
| 10 | Nico Varela | (Uruguay) | MF | 19 January 1991 (aged 33) | AEZ Zakakiou | 2023 | | 18 | 1 |
| 11 | Ilias Alhaft | (Netherlands) | MF | 23 February 1997 (aged 27) | Almere City | 2023 | | 34 | 7 |
| 13 | Robert Baghramyan | (Armenia) | MF | 29 June 2002 (aged 21) | Urartu | 202 | | 34 | 1 |
| 17 | Tigran Sargsyan | (Armenia) | MF | 14 August 2003 (aged 20) | Pyunik | 2021 | | 4 | 0 |
| 18 | Karen Galstyan | (Armenia) | MF | 18 June 2003 (aged 20) | BKMA Yerevan | 2024 | | 1 | 0 |
| 20 | Martin Gamboš | (Slovakia) | MF | 23 January 1998 (aged 26) | Västerås SK | 2023 | | 35 | 1 |
| 21 | Haggai Katoh | (Nigeria) | MF | 30 December 1998 (aged 25) | on loan from Plateau United | 2023 | | 39 | 1 |
| 23 | Hayk Ghevondyan | (Armenia) | MF | 1 July 2001 (aged 22) | on loan from Urartu | 2022 | | 24 | 1 |
| 27 | Gor Manvelyan | (Armenia) | MF | 9 April 2002 (aged 22) | Nantes | 2023 | | 23 | 3 |
| 65 | Gor Abrahamyan | (Armenia) | MF | 7 December 2005 (aged 18) | Academy | 2023 | | 6 | 0 |
| 81 | Alfred N'Diaye | (Senegal) | MF | 6 March 1990 (aged 34) | Unattached | 2024 | | 8 | 0 |
| 88 | Justin Mathieu | (Netherlands) | MF | 12 April 1996 (aged 28) | TOP Oss | 2023 | | 35 | 4 |
| 93 | Virgile Pinson | (France) | MF | 22 February 1996 (aged 28) | Unattached | 2024 | | 13 | 1 |
Forwards
| 7 | Edgar Movsesyan | (Armenia) | FW | 9 September 1998 (aged 25) | Van | 2023 | | 48 | 9 |
| 9 | Artur Miranyan | (Armenia) | FW | 27 December 1995 (aged 28) | Alashkert | 2023 | | 38 | 24 |
| 14 | Paul Gladon | (Netherlands) | FW | 18 March 1992 (aged 32) | Fortuna Sittard | 2023 | | 24 | 9 |
| 24 | Logan Rogerson | (New Zealand) | FW | 28 May 1998 (aged 25) | Haka | 2024 | | 7 | 0 |
Noah II
| | Erjanik Ghubasaryan | (Armenia) | MF | 21 February 2001 (aged 23) | BKMA Yerevan | 2023 | | 6 | 0 |
| | Allef | (Brazil) | FW | 4 November 1994 (aged 29) | Volga Ulyanovsk | 2023 | | 2 | 0 |
Players away on loan
| 5 | Norayr Nikoghosyan | (Armenia) | DF | 9 March 2002 (aged 22) | Noravank | 2022 | | 13 | 0 |
Players who left during the season
| 8 | Rumyan Hovsepyan | (Armenia) | MF | 13 November 1991 (aged 32) | Van | 2023 | | 2 | 0 |
| 22 | Christoffer Mafoumbi | (Republic of the Congo) | GK | 3 March 1994 (aged 30) | Differdange 03 | 2023 | | 9 | 0 |
| 25 | Dieumerci Mbokani | (Democratic Republic of the Congo) | FW | 22 November 1985 (aged 38) | Beveren | 2023 | | 10 | 2 |
| 30 | Ahmad Switat | (Israel) | DF | 18 March 2004 (aged 20) | Hapoel Ironi Kiryat Shmona | 2023 | | 0 | 0 |
| 70 | Alexandre Llovet | (France) | FW | 26 November 1997 (aged 26) | Sète 34 | 2023 | | 31 | 8 |
| 78 | Aleksandar Glišić | (Bosnia and Herzegovina) | FW | 3 September 1992 (aged 31) | Ararat Yerevan | 2023 | | 5 | 0 |
| 91 | Goodnews Igbokwe | (Nigeria) | FW | 26 February 2003 (aged 21) | Van | 2022 | | 24 | 6 |

== Transfers ==
=== In ===
| Date | Position | Nationality | Name | From | Fee | Ref. |
|---|---|---|---|---|---|---|
| 12 July 2023 | MF | (Armenia) | Robert Baghramyan | Urartu | Undisclosed | |
| 21 July 2023 | DF | (Netherlands) | Jordy Tutuarima | PEC Zwolle | Undisclosed | |
| 21 July 2023 | MF | (Netherlands) | Justin Mathieu | TOP Oss | Undisclosed | |
| 21 July 2023 | MF | (Portugal) | Martim Maia | Santa Clara | Undisclosed | |
| 21 July 2023 | MF | (Uruguay) | Nico Varela | AEZ Zakakiou | Undisclosed | |
| 21 July 2023 | FW | (Brazil) | Allef | Volga Ulyanovsk | Undisclosed | |
| 23 July 2023 | GK | (Republic of the Congo) | Christoffer Mafoumbi | Differdange 03 | Undisclosed | |
| 23 July 2023 | MF | (Slovakia) | Martin Gamboš | Västerås | Undisclosed | |
| 25 July 2023 | DF | (Armenia) | Vaspurak Minasyan | Van | Undisclosed | |
| 25 July 2023 | MF | (Armenia) | Rumyan Hovsepyan | Van | Undisclosed | |
| 25 July 2023 | FW | (Armenia) | Edgar Movsesyan | Van | Undisclosed | |
| 25 July 2023 | FW | (Armenia) | Artur Miranyan | Alashkert | Undisclosed | |
| 26 July 2023 | DF | (Mozambique) | David Malembana | Lokomotiv 1929 Sofia | Undisclosed | |
| 26 July 2023 | DF | (Portugal) | Pedro Farrim | Real | Undisclosed | |
| 27 July 2023 | GK | (Italy) | Valerio Vimercati | Unattached | Free | |
| 27 July 2023 | FW | (Bosnia and Herzegovina) | Aleksandar Glišić | Ararat Yerevan | Undisclosed | |
| 2 August 2023 | DF | (Israel) | Ahmad Switat | Hapoel Ironi Kiryat Shmona | Undisclosed | |
| 2 August 2023 | DF | (Serbia) | Aleksandar Miljković | Pyunik | Undisclosed | |
| 3 August 2023 | MF | (Netherlands) | Ilias Alhaft | Almere City | Undisclosed | |
| 14 August 2023 | FW | (Democratic Republic of the Congo) | Dieumerci Mbokani | Beveren | Undisclosed | |
| 24 August 2023 | FW | (Netherlands) | Paul Gladon | Fortuna Sittard | Undisclosed | |
| 25 August 2023 | DF | (Armenia) | Hovhannes Hambardzumyan | Anorthosis Famagusta | Undisclosed | |
| 14 September 2023 | FW | (Armenia) | Gor Manvelyan | Nantes | Undisclosed | |
| 15 January 2024 | GK | (Armenia) | Ognjen Čančarević | Unattached | Free | |
| 30 January 2024 | DF | (Brazil) | Pablo Santos | Unattached | Free | |
| 1 February 2024 | MF | (Senegal) | Alfred N'Diaye | Unattached | Free | |
| 15 February 2024 | FW | (New Zealand) | Logan Rogerson | Haka | Undisclosed | |
| 29 February 2024 | MF | (France) | Virgile Pinson | Unattached | Free | |

=== Out ===
| Date | Position | Nationality | Name | To | Fee | Ref. |
|---|---|---|---|---|---|---|
| 4 July 2023 | DF | (Nigeria) | Prince Ebenezer | Arda Kardzhali | Undisclosed | |
| 5 August 2023 | MF | (Nigeria) | Friday Adams | Botoșani | Undisclosed | |
| 7 February 2024 | DF | (Israel) | Ahmad Switat | Hapoel Umm al-Fahm | Undisclosed | |

=== Loans out ===
| Date from | Position | Nationality | Name | To | Date to | Ref. |
|---|---|---|---|---|---|---|
| 30 June 2023 | FW | (Nigeria) | Goodnews Igbokwe | Hapoel Ramat Gan Givatayim | 31 December 2023 | |

=== Released ===
| Date | Position | Nationality | Name | Joined | Date | Ref. |
|---|---|---|---|---|---|---|
| 25 June 2023 | MF | (Belarus) | Hayk Musakhanyan | Haka | 15 August 2023 | |
| 30 June 2023 | GK | (Armenia) | Arman Simonyan | Gandzasar Kapan | | |
| 30 June 2023 | DF | (Armenia) | Arsen Galstyan | Ararat Yerevan | 25 July 2023 | |
| 30 June 2023 | MF | (Ghana) | Israel Opoku | Nikarm | | |
| 31 December 2023 | GK | (Republic of the Congo) | Christoffer Mafoumbi | Floriana | 1 July 2024 | |
| 31 December 2023 | MF | (Armenia) | Rumyan Hovsepyan | Alashkert | | |
| 31 December 2023 | FW | (Bosnia and Herzegovina) | Aleksandar Glišić | Alashkert | | |
| 31 December 2023 | FW | (France) | Alexandre Llovet | Inter Club d'Escaldes | 21 August 2024 | |
| 31 December 2023 | FW | (Nigeria) | Goodnews Igbokwe | Hatta Club | 23 February 2024 | |
| 1 March 2024 | FW | (Democratic Republic of the Congo) | Dieumerci Mbokani | | | |

== Friendlies ==
| 20 January 2024 | Noah | 2–2 | Muaither | Qatar |
| (UTC+4) | Gladon; Movsesyan | Report | Goal |

| 26 January 2024 | Noah | 1–0 | Al Shahaniya | Qatar |
| 18:00 (UTC+4) | Mbokani | Report |

| 29 January 2024 | Noah | 3–0 | Qatar SC | Qatar |
| 12:30 (UTC+4) | Miranyan; Gladon; Miljković | Report |

| 3 February 2024 | Noah | 1–0 | Al-Wakrah | Qatar |
| 12:30 (UTC+4) | Alhaft | Report |

| 6 February 2024 | Noah | 0–0 | Zenit St.Petersburg | Qatar |
| 18:00 (UTC+4) | | Report |

| 8 February 2024 | Noah | 1–1 | Al-Markhiya | Qatar |
| 17:45 (UTC+4) | | Report |

| 9 February 2024 | Noah | 0–0 | Al-Gharafa | Qatar |
| 17:00 (UTC+4) | | Report |

== Competitions ==
=== Overall record ===
| Competition | First match | Last match | Starting round | Final position | Record | | | | | | | |
| Competition | First match | Last match | Starting round | Final position | Pld | W | D | L | GF | GA | GD | Win % |
|---|---|---|---|---|---|---|---|---|---|---|---|---|
| Premier League | 29 July 2023 | 25 May 2024 | Matchday 1 | 2nd | 36 | 26 | 2 | 8 | 69 | 33 | +36 | 72.22 |
| Armenian Cup | 25 November 2023 | 11 March 2024 | Second Round | Quarterfinal | 2 | 0 | 1 | 1 | 2 | 3 | −1 | 0.00 |
| Total | | | | | 38 | 26 | 3 | 9 | 71 | 36 | +35 | 68.42 |

Last updated: 25 May 2024
Source: Competitions

=== Premier League ===
==== Results summary ====
| Overall | | | | | | | | Home | | | | | | Away | | | | | |
| Pld | W | D | L | GF | GA | GD | Pts | W | D | L | GF | GA | GD | W | D | L | GF | GA | GD |
|---|---|---|---|---|---|---|---|---|---|---|---|---|---|---|---|---|---|---|---|
| 36 | 26 | 2 | 8 | 69 | 33 | +36 | 80 | 15 | 2 | 1 | 41 | 13 | +28 | 11 | 0 | 7 | 28 | 20 | +8 |

Last updated: 25 May 2024.
Source: See Results

==== Results by round ====
| Round | 1 | 2 | 3 | 4 | 5 | 6 | 7 | 8 | 9 | 10 | 11 | 12 | 13 | 14 | 15 | 16 | 17 | 18 | 19 | 20 | 21 | 22 | 23 | 24 | 25 | 26 | 27 | 28 | 29 | 30 | 31 | 32 | 33 | 34 | 35 | 36 |
|---|---|---|---|---|---|---|---|---|---|---|---|---|---|---|---|---|---|---|---|---|---|---|---|---|---|---|---|---|---|---|---|---|---|---|---|---|
| Ground | H | A | H | H | A | H | A | H | A | A | H | A | A | H | A | H | A | H | H | A | H | H | A | H | A | H | A | A | H | A | A | H | A | H | A | H |
| Result | W | L | W | W | L | W | L | L | W | W | W | L | W | W | W | W | L | W | W | W | D | W | W | W | W | D | W | W | W | W | L | W | W | W | L | W |
| Position | 5 | 7 | 1 | 1 | 6 | 4 | 5 | 5 | 5 | 5 | 5 | 5 | 5 | 3 | 3 | 2 | 3 | 2 | 2 | 2 | 3 | 2 | 2 | 2 | 2 | 2 | 1 | 1 | 1 | 1 | 1 | 1 | 1 | 1 | 2 | 2 |

Updated to match(es) played on 25 May 2024. Source: See Results
A = Away; H = Home; W = Win; D = Draw; L = Loss; V = Void

==== Results ====
| 29 July 2023 1 | Noah | 1–0 | Van | Armavir |
| 19:00 (UTC+4) | Miranyan 15' (pen.); Tutuarima (yellow card) 90+3' | Report | Buhari (yellow card) 4'; Gaba (yellow card) 20'; Okoronkwo (yellow card) 45+4'; Hovhannisyan (yellow card) 79'; Sholokh (yellow card) 90+3' | Stadium: City Stadium; Referee: Zaven Hovhannisyan |

| 4 August 2023 2 | BKMA Yerevan | 1–0 | Noah | Yerevan |
| 19:00 (UTC+4) | Alaverdyan (yellow card) 45'; Lulukyan (yellow card) 45+2'; Ayvazyan (yellow card) 67'; Khachumyan (yellow card) 71'; Nikoghosyan (yellow card) 71'; Tarakhchyan 90+2' (pen.) | Report | Miljković (yellow card) 49' (yellow-red card) 90+1'; Minasyan (yellow card) 55' | Stadium: FFA Stadium; Referee: Ashot Harutyunyan |

| 13 August 2023 3 | Noah | 2–0 | Urartu | Armavir |
| 19:00 (UTC+4) | Miranyan 45+3'; Vimercati (yellow card) 87'; Maia (yellow card) 90+12'; Baghramyan 90+13' | Report | Marcos Júnior (yellow card) 7'; Sabua (yellow card) 44' | Stadium: City Stadium; Referee: Artem Gasparyan |

| 18 August 2023 4 | Noah | 4–0 | Shirak | Armavir |
| 19:00 (UTC+4) | Miljković (yellow card) 10' (yellow-red card) 87'; Miranyan 33'; Llovet 54'; Alhaft 84'; Gamboš (yellow card) 90+1'; Movsesyan 90+3' | Report | Sadoyan (yellow card) 7'; R.Darbinyan (yellow card) 89'; Mkoyan (yellow card) 90+1' | Stadium: City Stadium; Referee: Ashot Ghaltakhchyan |

| 25 August 2023 5 | Alashkert | 2–1 | Noah | Yerevan |
| 17:00 (UTC+4) | Yedigaryan 7'; William (yellow card) 21'; Kutalia (yellow card) 45' (goal) 60' | Report | Katoh 45+2'; Muradyan (red card) 56'; Glišić (yellow card) 90+2' | Stadium: Alashkert Stadium; Referee: Zaven Hovhannisyan |

| 31 August 2023 6 | Noah | 3–0 | Ararat Yerevan | Armavir |
| 20:00 (UTC+4) | Gladon 2', 70'; Miljković 21' | Report | Galstyan (yellow card) 45+1'; Mzoughi (red card) 59'; Hadji (yellow card) 81' | Stadium: City Stadium; Referee: Yura Mahtesyan |

| 15 September 2023 7 | Ararat-Armenia | 4–3 | Noah | Yerevan |
| 19:00 (UTC+4) | Yattara 12', 40' (yellow card) 54'; Castanheira 45+1', 70'; Yenne (yellow card) 54' da Silva (yellow card) 75'; Ermakov (yellow card) 90+3'; Nondi (yellow card) 90+7' | Report | Miljković (yellow card) 34'; Varela 51'; Gladon 67'; Muradyan 86' | Stadium: FFA Stadium; Referee: Henrik Nalbandian |

| 21 September 2023 8 | Noah | 0–1 | Pyunik | Armavir |
| 19:00 (UTC+4) | Varela (yellow card) 68'; Gladon (yellow card) 85'; Hambardzumyan (yellow card) 86' | Report | Malakyan (red card) 48'; Harutyunyan 87' (pen.); Grigoryan (yellow card) 90+3'; Buchnev (yellow card) 90+4'; Caraballo (yellow card) 90+4' | Stadium: City Stadium; Referee: Ashot Ghaltakhchyan |

| 26 September 2023 9 | West Armenia | 2–4 | Noah | Yerevan |
| 16:00 (UTC+4) | Ufuoma (yellow card) 37'; Movsisyan 53' (yellow card) 60' (yellow-red card) 66'; Dziov (yellow card) 60' (goal) 61' | Report | Miljković 11'; Alhaft 38'; Miranyan 41' (pen.); Gladon 67' (pen.) | Stadium: Junior Sport Stadium; Referee: Vardan Manukyan |

| 30 September 2023 10 | Van | 0–2 | Noah | Charentsavan |
| 15:00 (UTC+4) | Mnatsakanyan (yellow card) 40' | Report | Miljković (yellow card) 21'; Alhaft (yellow card) 26' (goal) 86'; Maia (yellow card) 66'; Vimercati (yellow card) 69'; Mbokani 82' | Stadium: City Stadium; Referee: Yura Mahtesyan |

| 5 October 2023 11 | Noah | 3–0 | BKMA Yerevan | Armavir |
| 15:00 (UTC+4) | Gladon 22', 54'; Miranyan 45'; Muradyan (yellow card) 57'; Katoh (yellow card) 65' | Report | Aghbalyan (yellow card) 24'; Yesayan (yellow card) 29'; Manukyan (red card) 57' | Stadium: City Stadium; Referee: Sargis Khachatryan |

| 21 October 2023 12 | Urartu | 2–1 | Noah | Yerevan |
| 19:00 (UTC+4) | Polyakov (yellow card) 3'; Prudnikov 23'; Piloyan (yellow card) 38'; Aghasaryan (yellow card) 43'; Sanogo (yellow card) 81' | Report | Maia (yellow card) 39' | Stadium: Urartu Stadium; Referee: Artem Gasparyan |

| 26 October 2023 13 | Shirak | 0–2 | Noah | Gyumri |
| 19:00 (UTC+4) | Misakyan (yellow card) 18'; L.Darbinyan (yellow card) 39'; Kodia (yellow card) 88'; Mnatsakanyan (yellow card) 90+4' | Report | Miranyan 16', 34'; Miljković (yellow card) 45'; Muradyan (yellow card) 67'; Maia (yellow card) 76'; Vimercati (yellow card) 80' | Stadium: City Stadium; Referee: Henrik Nalbandian |

| 30 October 2023 14 | Noah | 4–2 | Alashkert | Abovyan |
| 17:00 (UTC+4) | Miranyan (yellow card) 17' (goal) 19'; Mbokani 20'; Alhaft 39' (yellow card) 76'; Varela (yellow card) 70'; Movsesyan 84'; Maia (yellow card) 89'; Gladon (yellow card) 90+6' | Report | Kutalia 7' (pen.); Voskanyan 12' (yellow card) 53'; Wbeymar (yellow card) 48'; Carrillo (yellow card) 70'; Mužek (yellow card) 81'; Cametá (yellow card) 88' | Stadium: City Stadium; Referee: Vardan Manukyan |

| 3 November 2023 15 | Ararat Yerevan | 0–2 | Noah | Yerevan |
| 18:00 (UTC+4) | Mani (yellow card) 36'; Lhernault (yellow card) 39'; Faye (yellow card) 64'; Nahapetyan (yellow card) 74' | Report | Muradyan (yellow card) 19'; Gladon (yellow card) 40'; Gamboš 44'; Llovet 78' (yellow card) 90+1' | Stadium: Republican Stadium; Referee: Zaven Hovhannisyan |

| 7 November 2023 16 | Noah | 1–0 | Ararat-Armenia | Abovyan |
| 18:00 (UTC+4) | Movsesyan 18' (yellow card) 77'; Gladon (yellow card) 37'; Muradyan (yellow card) 40' | Report | Muradyan (yellow card) 50'; Nondi (yellow card) 55' (yellow-red card) 72'; Grigoryan (yellow card) 86'; Tera (yellow card) 90'; Castanheira (yellow card) 90' | Stadium: City Stadium; Referee: Henrik Nalbandian |

| 11 November 2023 17 | Pyunik | 3–1 | Noah | Yerevan |
| 15:00 (UTC+4) | Otubanjo (yellow card) 42'; Harutyunyan 45+1' (pen.), 59'; Gonçalves 47' | Report | Alhaft 3'; Movsesyan (yellow card) 27'; Muradyan (yellow card) 43' | Stadium: Junior Sports Stadium; Referee: Artem Gasparyan |

| 29 November 2023 18 | Noah | 5–1 | West Armenia | Abovyan |
| 16:00 (UTC+4) | Manvelyan 33'; Miranyan 69' (pen.), 71', 90+1'; Mathieu 90+5' | Report | Mensalão 28' (pen.); Khachatryan (yellow card) 44'; Strelnik (yellow card) 45+1'; Kharatyan (yellow card) 68' | Stadium: City Stadium; Referee: Sargis Khachatryan |

| 4 December 2023 19 | Noah | 3–1 | Van | Abovyan |
| 16:00 (UTC+4) | Manvelyan (yellow card) 21'; Miranyan 32', 45+3'; Maia (yellow card) 45'; Gladon 90+7' | Report | Chiloyan (yellow card) 47'; Ojetunde (yellow card) 64'; B.Hovhannisyan (yellow card) 79'; Williams 84' | Stadium: City Stadium; Referee: Zaven Hovhannisyan |

| 8 December 2023 20 | BKMA Yerevan | 0–2 | Noah | Yerevan |
| 18:00 (UTC+4) | Alaverdyan (yellow card) 43' | Report | Miranyan 6'; Movsesyan 74' | Stadium: FFA Stadium; Referee: Artem Gasparyan |

| 22 February 2024 21 | Noah | 1–1 | Urartu | Armavir |
| 18:00 (UTC+4) | Movsesyan 9'; Pablo (red card) 23'; Gamboš (yellow card) 90+4' | Report | Margaryan (yellow card) 30'; Polyakov (yellow card) 43'; Dzhikiya 58' (pen.) | Stadium: City Stadium; Referee: Henrik Nalbandian |

| 26 February 2024 22 | Noah | 1–0 | Shirak | Armavir |
| 18:00 (UTC+4) | Alhaft (yellow card) 49'; Gladon 54' | Report | Mryan (yellow card) 20'; Misakyan (yellow card) 77'; Doh (yellow card) 82' | Stadium: City Stadium; Referee: Yura Mahtesyan |

| 2 March 2024 23 | Alashkert | 0–2 | Noah | Yerevan |
| 15:00 (UTC+4) | Yedigaryan (yellow card) 31'; Kocharyan (yellow card) 45'; Agdon (yellow card) 70' | Report | Malembana (yellow card) 19'; Miranyan 51' (yellow card) 89'; N'Diaye (red card) 73'; Movsesyan (yellow card) 90+7'; Vimercati (yellow card) 90+7' | Stadium: Alashkert Stadium; Referee: Ashot Ghaltakhchyan |

| 7 March 2024 24 | Noah | 4–3 | Ararat Yerevan | Armavir |
| 18:00 (UTC+4) | Maia 7'; Miranyan 26', 35'; Mathieu 29'; Malembana (yellow card) 31'; Alhaft (yellow card) 38' | Report | S.Galstyan 18' (yellow card) 41'; Nahapetyan 72'; Ransom 79'; Dombila (yellow card) 87' | Stadium: City Stadium; Referee: Vardan Manukyan |

| 15 March 2024 25 | Ararat-Armenia | 0–1 | Noah | Yerevan |
| 19:00 (UTC+4) | Hovhannisyan (yellow card) 33'; Scheid (yellow card) 57'; Yenne (yellow card) 80'; Alemão (yellow card) 89'; Yattara (yellow card) 90+5' | Report | Gamboš (yellow card) 30'; Mathieu (yellow card) 70'; Gladon 77'; S. Muradyan (yellow card) 82'; Movsesyan (yellow card) 84'; Minasyan (yellow card) 90+3'; Čančarević (yellow card) 90+5' | Stadium: FFA Stadium; Referee: Henrik Nalbandian |

| 31 March 2024 26 | Noah | 1–1 | Pyunik | Armavir |
| 19:00 (UTC+4) | Minasyan (yellow card) 48'; Manvelyan 83' | Report | Otubanjo 7'; Bravo (yellow card) 38'; Kovalenko (yellow card) 67'; Santos (yellow card) 70' | Stadium: City Stadium; Referee: Yura Mahtesyan |

| 5 April 2024 27 | West Armenia | 2–5 | Noah | Yerevan |
| 15:00 (UTC+4) | Khachatryan (yellow card) 26'; Loretsyan 72'; Oparaocha 90+3' | Report | Manvelyan 35'; Pinson 64'; Movsesyan 81', 89'; Miranyan 86' | Stadium: Junior Sports Stadium; Referee: Zaven Hovhannisyan |

| 11 April 2024 28 | Van | 0–1 | Noah | Charentsavan |
| 16:00 (UTC+4) | Piloyan (yellow card) 79' | Report | Miranyan (yellow card) 36' (goal) 90+1'; Alhaft (yellow card) 90+3'; Mathieu (yellow card) 90+8' | Stadium: City Stadium; Referee: Vardan Manukyan |

| 19 April 2024 29 | Noah | 1–0 | BKMA Yerevan | Armavir |
| 19:00 (UTC+4) | Pablo 32'; Malembana (yellow card) 60' | Report | N.Hovhannisyan (yellow card) 75' | Stadium: City Stadium; Referee: Zaven Hovhannisyan |

| 23 April 2024 30 | Urartu | 0–1 | Noah | Yerevan |
| 19:00 (UTC+4) | Salou (yellow card) 56' | Report | Hambardzumyan 29'; Maia (yellow card) 39'; Miljković (yellow card) 78'; Čančarević (yellow card) 90+2' | Stadium: Urartu Stadium; Referee: Henrik Nalbandian |

| 27 April 2024 31 | Shirak | 1–0 | Noah | Gyumri |
| 19:00 (UTC+4) | Ghukasyan (yellow card) 12'; Kodia (yellow card) 61'; Kone 68'; Doh (yellow card) 90+4'; Manukyan (yellow card) 90+6' | Report | Maia (yellow card) 45+2'; Farrim (yellow card) 45+6'; Čančarević (red card) 90' | Stadium: City Stadium; Referee: Artak Vardanyan |

| 4 May 2024 32 | Noah | 2–1 | Alashkert | Armavir |
| 17:00 (UTC+4) | Pinson (yellow card) 11'; Miranyan 42' (pen.), 53'; Varela (yellow card) 90+3' | Report | Sokhiyev (yellow card) 15'; Wbeymar (yellow card) 40'; Biai (yellow card) 79'; Miljković 87' (o.g.) | Stadium: City Stadium; Referee: Henrik Nalbandian |

| 9 May 2024 33 | Ararat Yerevan | 0–1 | Noah | Yerevan |
| 19:00 (UTC+4) | Donfack (yellow card) 44'; Mani (yellow card) 90+7' | Report | Miranyan 7'; Miljković (yellow card) 78' | Stadium: Republican Stadium; Referee: Zaven Hovhannisyan |

| 16 May 2024 34 | Noah | 2–1 | Ararat-Armenia | Abovyan |
| 20:00 (UTC+4) | Alhaft 27'; Mathieu 43' | Report | Ambartsumyan (red card) 40'; Yattara 57'; Castanheira (yellow card) 79' | Stadium: City Stadium; Referee: Ashot Ghaltakhchyan |

| 21 May 2024 35 | Pyunik | 3–0 | Noah | Yerevan |
| 17:00 (UTC+4) | Juninho (yellow card) 13'; Otubanjo 32'; Harutyunyan 43' (pen.); James (yellow card) 61'; Bratkov 85' | Report | Malembana (yellow card) 13'; Maia (yellow card) 45+1'; Miljković (yellow card) 73' | Stadium: Junior Sports Stadium; Referee: Artem Gasparyan |

| 25 May 2024 36 | Noah | 3–1 | West Armenia | Abovyan |
| 17:30 (UTC+4) | Miranyan 30' (pen.); Pinson (yellow card) 69'; Pablo 79'; Mathieu 90+3' | Report | Dramé 10' (yellow card) 34'; Martirosyan (yellow card) 89' | Stadium: City Stadium; Referee: Zaven Hovhannisyan |

==== Table ====
| Pos | Team | Pld | W | D | L | GF | GA | GD | Pts | Qualification or relegation |
|---|---|---|---|---|---|---|---|---|---|---|
| 1 | Pyunik (C) | 36 | 24 | 10 | 2 | 84 | 28 | +56 | 82 | Qualification for the Champions League first qualifying round |
| 2 | Noah | 36 | 26 | 2 | 8 | 69 | 33 | +36 | 80 | Qualification for the Conference League first qualifying round |
| 3 | Ararat-Armenia | 36 | 23 | 6 | 7 | 73 | 34 | +39 | 75 | Qualification for the Conference League second qualifying round (Note: Ararat-Armenia qualified for the Conference League second qualifying round by winning the 2023–24 Armenian Cup. Since they qualified based on league position, the second Conference League first round spot was passed to the fourth-placed team.) |
| 4 | Urartu | 36 | 13 | 11 | 12 | 49 | 49 | 0 | 50 | Qualification for the Conference League first qualifying round |
| 5 | Alashkert | 36 | 13 | 6 | 17 | 54 | 56 | −2 | 45 | |
| 6 | Ararat Yerevan | 36 | 13 | 6 | 17 | 39 | 50 | −11 | 45 | |
| 7 | West Armenia | 36 | 11 | 4 | 21 | 43 | 73 | −30 | 37 | |
| 8 | Shirak | 36 | 8 | 9 | 19 | 28 | 46 | −18 | 33 | |
| 9 | Van | 36 | 8 | 8 | 20 | 32 | 67 | −35 | 32 | |
| 10 | BKMA | 36 | 7 | 6 | 23 | 32 | 67 | −35 | 27 | |

Source: FFA Soccerway
Rules for classification: 1) Points; 2) Head-to-head points; 3) Head-to-head goal difference; 4) Head-to-head goals scored; 5) Matches won; 6) Goal difference; 7) Less red cards; 8) Less yellow cards; 9) Fair-play ranking 10) Draw
(C) Champions

=== Armenian Cup ===
| 25 November 2023 Second Round | Alashkert | 0–0 (a.e.t.) (8–9 p) | Noah | Yerevan |
| 14:00 (UTC+4) | Agdon (yellow card) 70'; William (yellow card) 90+1' | Report | Gamboš (yellow card) 73'; Llovet (yellow card) 80'; Danielyan (yellow card) 73'; Vimercati (yellow card) FT | Stadium: Alashkert Stadium; Referee: Henrik Nalbandian |
| | Penalties |
| | Kutalia (penalty missed); Voskanyan (penalty scored); Gareginyan (penalty scored); Nalbandyan (penalty scored); Yedigaryan (penalty scored); William (penalty scored); Kocharyan (penalty scored); Carrillo (penalty scored); Racines (penalty scored); Mensah (penalty missed) | | (penalty scored) Hambardzumyan; (penalty scored) Mathieu; (penalty scored) Miranyan; (penalty missed) Varela; (penalty scored) Gladon; (penalty scored) Manvelyan; (penalty scored) Malembana; (penalty scored) Maia; (penalty scored) Danielyan; (penalty scored) Vimercati |

| 11 March 2024 Quarterfinal | Noah | 2–3 | Ararat-Armenia | Abovyan |
| 18:00 (UTC+4) | Miranyan 13' (pen.); Mathieu (yellow card) 16'; Gamboš (yellow card) 46'; Alhaft 90' | Report | Tera (yellow card) 30'; Rodríguez 37'; Duarte 62'; Serobyan 82' (pen.); Shishkovski (yellow card) 90+2' | Stadium: City Stadium; Referee: Zaven Hovhannisyan |

== Statistics ==
As of match played 25 May 2024

=== Appearances and goals ===
| No. | Pos | Nat | Player | Total | | Premier League | | Armenian Cup | |
| No. | Pos | Nat | Player | Apps | Goals | Apps | Goals | Apps | Goals |
|---|---|---|---|---|---|---|---|---|---|
| 3 | DF | (Armenia) ARM | Sergey Muradyan | 25 | 1 | 21+3 | 1 | 0+1 | 0 |
| 4 | DF | (Portugal) POR | Pedro Farrim | 6 | 0 | 2+4 | 0 | 0 | 0 |
| 5 | DF | (Netherlands) NED | Jordy Tutuarima | 33 | 0 | 30+2 | 0 | 1 | 0 |
| 6 | MF | (Portugal) POR | Martim Maia | 35 | 1 | 33 | 1 | 1+1 | 0 |
| 7 | FW | (Armenia) ARM | Edgar Movsesyan | 35 | 8 | 12+21 | 8 | 2 | 0 |
| 9 | FW | (Armenia) ARM | Artur Miranyan | 38 | 24 | 35+1 | 23 | 2 | 1 |
| 10 | MF | (Uruguay) URU | Nico Varela | 18 | 1 | 8+9 | 1 | 0+1 | 0 |
| 11 | MF | (Netherlands) NED | Ilias Alhaft | 34 | 7 | 24+8 | 6 | 1+1 | 1 |
| 13 | MF | (Armenia) ARM | Robert Baghramyan | 5 | 1 | 2+3 | 1 | 0 | 0 |
| 14 | FW | (Netherlands) NED | Paul Gladon | 24 | 9 | 16+6 | 9 | 1+1 | 0 |
| 18 | MF | (Armenia) ARM | Karen Galstyan | 1 | 0 | 0+1 | 0 | 0 | 0 |
| 19 | DF | (Armenia) ARM | Vaspurak Minasyan | 22 | 0 | 15+6 | 0 | 1 | 0 |
| 20 | MF | (Slovakia) SVK | Martin Gamboš | 35 | 1 | 29+4 | 1 | 2 | 0 |
| 21 | MF | (Nigeria) NGR | Haggai Katoh | 26 | 1 | 7+19 | 1 | 0 | 0 |
| 22 | GK | (Armenia) ARM | Ognjen Čančarević | 15 | 0 | 15 | 0 | 0 | 0 |
| 23 | MF | (Armenia) ARM | Hayk Ghevondyan | 1 | 0 | 0+1 | 0 | 0 | 0 |
| 24 | FW | (New Zealand) NZL | Logan Rogerson | 7 | 0 | 1+5 | 0 | 1 | 0 |
| 26 | DF | (Serbia) SRB | Aleksandar Miljković | 33 | 2 | 29+2 | 2 | 2 | 0 |
| 27 | FW | (Armenia) ARM | Gor Manvelyan | 23 | 3 | 13+8 | 3 | 0+2 | 0 |
| 28 | DF | (Brazil) BRA | Pablo Santos | 6 | 2 | 6 | 2 | 0 | 0 |
| 31 | DF | (Armenia) ARM | Hovhannes Hambardzumyan | 28 | 1 | 19+7 | 1 | 1+1 | 0 |
| 55 | DF | (Mozambique) MOZ | David Malembana | 18 | 0 | 13+3 | 0 | 2 | 0 |
| 65 | MF | (Armenia) ARM | Gor Abrahamyan | 2 | 0 | 0+2 | 0 | 0 | 0 |
| 71 | DF | (Armenia) ARM | Artur Danielyan | 10 | 0 | 3+6 | 0 | 1 | 0 |
| 77 | GK | (Italy) ITA | Valerio Vimercati | 14 | 0 | 12 | 0 | 2 | 0 |
| 81 | MF | (Senegal) SEN | Alfred N'Diaye | 8 | 0 | 6+1 | 0 | 1 | 0 |
| 88 | MF | (Netherlands) NED | Justin Mathieu | 35 | 4 | 18+15 | 4 | 1+1 | 0 |
| 93 | MF | (France) FRA | Virgile Pinson | 13 | 1 | 7+5 | 1 | 0+1 | 0 |
Noah II players:
| 11 | FW | (Brazil) BRA | Allef | 2 | 0 | 0+2 | 0 | 0 | 0 |
Players away on loan:
Players who left Noah during the season:
| 8 | MF | (Armenia) ARM | Rumyan Hovsepyan | 2 | 0 | 0+2 | 0 | 0 | 0 |
| 22 | GK | (Republic of the Congo) CGO | Christoffer Mafoumbi | 9 | 0 | 9 | 0 | 0 | 0 |
| 25 | FW | (Democratic Republic of the Congo) COD | Dieumerci Mbokani | 10 | 2 | 3+7 | 2 | 0 | 0 |
| 70 | FW | (France) FRA | Alexandre Llovet | 15 | 2 | 7+7 | 2 | 0+1 | 0 |
| 78 | FW | (Bosnia and Herzegovina) BIH | Aleksandar Glišić | 5 | 0 | 1+4 | 0 | 0 | 0 |

=== Goal scorers ===
| Place | Position | Nation | Number | Name | Premier League | Armenian Cup | Total |
|---|---|---|---|---|---|---|---|
| 1 | FW | (Armenia) | 9 | Artur Miranyan | 23 | 1 | 24 |
| 2 | FW | (Netherlands) | 14 | Paul Gladon | 9 | 0 | 9 |
| 3 | FW | (Armenia) | 7 | Edgar Movsesyan | 8 | 0 | 8 |
| 4 | MF | (Netherlands) | 11 | Ilias Alhaft | 6 | 1 | 7 |
| 5 | MF | (Netherlands) | 88 | Justin Mathieu | 4 | 0 | 4 |
| 6 | FW | (Armenia) | 27 | Gor Manvelyan | 3 | 0 | 3 |
| 7 | DF | (Serbia) | 26 | Aleksandar Miljković | 2 | 0 | 2 |
| 7 | FW | (Democratic Republic of the Congo) | 25 | Dieumerci Mbokani | 2 | 0 | 2 |
| 7 | FW | (France) | 70 | Alexandre Llovet | 2 | 0 | 2 |
| 7 | DF | (Brazil) | 28 | Pablo Santos | 2 | 0 | 2 |
| 11 | MF | (Armenia) | 13 | Robert Baghramyan | 1 | 0 | 1 |
| 11 | MF | (Nigeria) | 21 | Haggai Katoh | 1 | 0 | 1 |
| 11 | MF | (Uruguay) | 10 | Nico Varela | 1 | 0 | 1 |
| 11 | DF | (Armenia) | 3 | Sergey Muradyan | 1 | 0 | 1 |
| 11 | MF | (Slovakia) | 20 | Martin Gamboš | 1 | 0 | 1 |
| 11 | MF | (Portugal) | 6 | Martim Maia | 1 | 0 | 1 |
| 11 | MF | (France) | 93 | Virgile Pinson | 1 | 0 | 1 |
| 11 | DF | (Armenia) | 31 | Hovhannes Hambardzumyan | 1 | 0 | 1 |
| | | | | TOTALS | 67 | 2 | 69 |

=== Clean sheets ===
| Place | Position | Nation | Number | Name | Premier League | Armenian Cup | Total |
|---|---|---|---|---|---|---|---|
| 1 | GK | (Armenia) | 22 | Ognjen Čančarević | 7 | 0 | 7 |
| 1 | GK | (Italy) | 77 | Valerio Vimercati | 6 | 1 | 7 |
| 3 | GK | (Republic of the Congo) | 22 | Christoffer Mafoumbi | 4 | 0 | 4 |
| | | | | TOTALS | 17 | 1 | 18 |

=== Disciplinary record ===
| Number | Nation | Position | Name | Premier League | | Armenian Cup | | Total | |
| Number | Nation | Position | Name | Booked | Sent off (straight red) | Booked | Sent off (straight red) | Booked | Sent off (straight red) |
| 3 | (Armenia) | DF | Sergey Muradyan | 6 | 1 | 0 | 0 | 6 | 1 |
| 4 | (Portugal) | DF | Pedro Farrim | 1 | 0 | 0 | 0 | 1 | 0 |
| 5 | (Netherlands) | DF | Jordy Tutuarima | 1 | 0 | 0 | 0 | 1 | 0 |
| 6 | (Portugal) | MF | Martim Maia | 9 | 0 | 0 | 0 | 9 | 0 |
| 7 | (Armenia) | FW | Edgar Movsesyan | 3 | 0 | 0 | 0 | 3 | 0 |
| 9 | (Armenia) | FW | Artur Miranyan | 3 | 0 | 0 | 0 | 3 | 0 |
| 10 | (Uruguay) | MF | Nico Varela | 3 | 0 | 0 | 0 | 3 | 0 |
| 11 | (Netherlands) | MF | Ilias Alhaft | 5 | 0 | 0 | 0 | 5 | 0 |
| 14 | (Netherlands) | FW | Paul Gladon | 4 | 0 | 0 | 0 | 4 | 0 |
| 19 | (Armenia) | DF | Vaspurak Minasyan | 3 | 0 | 0 | 0 | 3 | 0 |
| 20 | (Slovakia) | MF | Martin Gamboš | 3 | 0 | 2 | 0 | 5 | 0 |
| 21 | (Nigeria) | MF | Haggai Katoh | 1 | 0 | 0 | 0 | 1 | 0 |
| 22 | (Armenia) | GK | Ognjen Čančarević | 2 | 1 | 0 | 0 | 2 | 1 |
| 26 | (Serbia) | DF | Aleksandar Miljković | 10 | 2 | 0 | 0 | 10 | 2 |
| 27 | (Armenia) | FW | Gor Manvelyan | 1 | 0 | 0 | 0 | 1 | 0 |
| 28 | (Brazil) | DF | Pablo Santos | 0 | 1 | 0 | 0 | 0 | 1 |
| 31 | (Armenia) | DF | Hovhannes Hambardzumyan | 1 | 0 | 0 | 0 | 1 | 0 |
| 55 | (Mozambique) | DF | David Malembana | 4 | 0 | 0 | 0 | 4 | 0 |
| 71 | (Armenia) | DF | Artur Danielyan | 0 | 0 | 1 | 0 | 1 | 0 |
| 77 | (Italy) | GK | Valerio Vimercati | 4 | 0 | 1 | 0 | 5 | 0 |
| 81 | (Senegal) | MF | Alfred N'Diaye | 0 | 1 | 0 | 0 | 0 | 1 |
| 88 | (Netherlands) | MF | Justin Mathieu | 2 | 0 | 1 | 0 | 3 | 0 |
| 93 | (France) | MF | Virgile Pinson | 2 | 0 | 0 | 0 | 2 | 0 |
Players away on loan:
Players who left Noah during the season:
| 70 | (France) | FW | Alexandre Llovet | 1 | 0 | 1 | 0 | 2 | 0 |
| 78 | (Bosnia and Herzegovina) | FW | Aleksandar Glišić | 1 | 0 | 0 | 0 | 1 | 0 |
| | | | TOTALS | 70 | 6 | 6 | 0 | 76 | 6 |
