= 2023–24 Armenian Cup =

Tournament details
- Country: Armenia
- Teams: 20

Final positions
- Champions: Ararat-Armenia
- Runners-up: Urartu

Tournament statistics
- Matches played: 19
- Goals scored: 70 (3.68 per match)
- All statistics correct as of 12 May 2024.

The 2023–24 Armenian Cup was the 33rd edition of the football competition in Armenia. The winners qualified for the 2024–25 UEFA Conference League second qualifying round.

Ararat-Armenia won the cup on 12 May 2024 (their first Armenian Cup win), defeating Urartu 5–3 on penalties after a 1–1 draw.

== Teams ==
Round	Clubs remaining	Clubs involved	Winners from previous round	New entries this round	Leagues entering at this round
First round	20	12	None	12	3 Amateur A-League teams 7 Armenian First League teams 2 Armenian Premier League teams
Second round	14	12	6	6	6 Armenian Premier League teams
Quarter-finals	8	8	6	2	2 Armenian Premier League teams (Urartu and Shirak as finalists of 2022-23 Armenian Cup (Urartu also won 2022-23 Armenian Premier League))
Semi-finals	4	4	4	none	none
Final	2	2	2	none	none

== First round ==
On 7 July 2023, the Football Federation of Armenia announced the draw for the first round.

5 October 2023	Gandzasar Kapan	5–1	Onor	Kapan
14:00 (UTC+4)	Kostic 11' (yellow card) 55'; Hagy 17', 56'; Hambardzumyan 51' (pen.); Emmanuel (yellow card) 60'; Nasr 71'; Arshakyan (yellow card) 84'	Report	Yeghiazaryan (yellow card) 37'; Ka.Hovhannisyan (yellow card) 39'; Stepanov (yellow card) 40'; Lyadinsky (yellow card) 50'; Hunanyan (yellow card) 75'; Kirakosyan 90+4'	Stadium: Gandzasar Stadium; Referee: Vardan Manukyan

6 October 2023	Syunik	7–0	Nikarm	Kapan
14:00 (UTC+4)	Sargsyan 22', 40', 45+3' (yellow card) 50'; D.Vardanyan 64' (pen.); Maghakyan 64' (pen.); Avetisyan (yellow card) 70'; Gevorgyan 86' (pen.); Y.Arakelyan 89'	Report	D.Hakobyan (yellow card) 37'; Alikhanyan (yellow card) 62'; S.Martirosyan (yellow card) 77' (red card) 77'	Stadium: Gandzasar Stadium; Referee: Ashot Harutyunyan

7 October 2023	Ecoville	1–4	Mika	Yerevan
19:00 (UTC+4)	Manucharyan 23'; Habetyan (yellow card) 90+8'	Report	Karapetyan 48', 90+7'; N.Martirosyan (yellow card) 49' (goal) 62'; Aleksanyan 90+5'	Stadium: FFA Stadium; Referee: Tigran Eritsyan

8 October 2023	Lernayin Artsakh	0–1	West Armenia	Vayk
14:00 (UTC+4)	Jindoyan (yellow card) 53'; T.Hakobyan (yellow card) 88'	Report	Léo Pará (yellow card) 23'; Mwijage 27'; Movsisyan (red card) 65'; Manukyan (yellow card) 90+1'	Stadium: Arevik Stadium; Referee: Zaven Hovhannisyan

8 October 2023	BKMA Yerevan	6–0	Andranik	Yerevan
19:00 (UTC+4)	S.Hakobyan 31', 84'; Titizyan 33'; Petrosyan 45'; Hovhannisyan (yellow card) 63' (goal) 76'; M.Hakobyan 79'	Report	Abayomi (yellow card) 65'; Piccone (yellow card) 78'; Eyong (yellow card) 83'; Bangura (red card) 90+1'; Tiraturyan (yellow card) 90+5'	Stadium: FFA Stadium; Referee: Artak Vardanyan

10 October 2023	Kilikia	9–1	Falcons	Yerevan
19:00 (UTC+4)	Karapetyan 7', 49', 79', 80'; Poghosyan 30'; Sylla 43', 68'; Isaac 60' (pen.); Yardumyan (yellow card) 65'; Matevosyan 90'	Report	H.Ghazaryan 75'; Aramyan (yellow card) 83'; A.Petrosyan (yellow card) 87'	Stadium: FFA Stadium; Referee: Hovhannes Kalantaryan

== Second round ==
On 23 October 2023, the Football Federation of Armenia announced the draw for the second round.

22 November 2023	Mika	1–2	Kilikia	Yerevan
14:00 (UTC+4)	An. Karapetyan 14'; Martirosyan (yellow card) 20'; Matevosyan (yellow card) 53'; Aleksanyan (yellow card) 90+2'	Report	Al.Karapetyan 4', 41'; Opoku (yellow card) 34'; Ghazaryan (yellow card) 39'; Mansour (yellow card) 45+2'; Olawale (yellow card) 65'; Poghosyan (yellow card) 86'	Stadium: Mika Stadium; Referee: Ashot Harutyunyan

23 November 2023	Van	2–1	West Armenia	Charentsavan
14:00 (UTC+4)	Chiloyan (yellow card) 45+9' (goal) 51'; Okoronkwo (yellow card) 45+14'; Boniface 45+20' (pen.)	Report	Khachatryan 54'	Stadium: City Stadium; Referee: Yura Mahtesyan

24 November 2023	Pyunik	3–1 (a.e.t.)	Ararat Yerevan	Yerevan
14:00 (UTC+4)	Malakyan 44' (pen.); Ravanelli (yellow card) 65'; Harutyunyan 93' (pen.); Hendriks 105+1'	Report	Ransom (yellow card) 21'; Mahmoud 24'; Mani (yellow card) 33'; Hakobyan (yellow card) 58'; Mkrtchyan (yellow card) 65'	Stadium: Junior Sports Stadium; Referee: Zaven Hovhannisyan

24 November 2023	Ararat-Armenia	1–0	Gandzasar Kapan	Yerevan
18:00 (UTC+4)	Ambartsumyan (yellow card) 27'; Hakobyan (yellow card) 30'; Alemão 85'	Report	Zakaryan (yellow card) 24'; Nasr (yellow card) 27'; Kostic (yellow card) 58'	Stadium: FFA Stadium; Referee: Ashot Ghaltakhchyan

25 November 2023	Alashkert	0–0 (a.e.t.) (8–9 p)	Noah	Yerevan
14:00 (UTC+4)	Agdon (yellow card) 70'; William (yellow card) 90+1'	Report	Gamboš (yellow card) 73'; Llovet (yellow card) 80'; Danielyan (yellow card) 73'; Vimercati (yellow card) FT	Stadium: Alashkert Stadium; Referee: Henrik Nalbandian
	Penalties
	Kutalia (penalty missed); Voskanyan (penalty scored); Gareginyan (penalty scored); Nalbandyan (penalty scored); Yedigaryan (penalty scored); William (penalty scored); Kocharyan (penalty scored); Carrillo (penalty scored); Racines (penalty scored); Mensah (penalty missed)		(penalty scored) Hambardzumyan; (penalty scored) Mathieu; (penalty scored) Miranyan; (penalty missed) Varela; (penalty scored) Gladon; (penalty scored) Manvelyan; (penalty scored) Malembana; (penalty scored) Maia; (penalty scored) Danielyan; (penalty scored) Vimercati

26 November 2023	Syunik	0–1	BKMA Yerevan	Kapan
14:00 (UTC+4)	Soghomonyan (yellow card) 30'; Afajanyan (yellow card) 62'; Simonyan (yellow card) 65'	Report	Petrosyan 26' (yellow card) 71'; Yesayan (yellow card) 41'	Stadium: Gandzasar Stadium; Referee: Vardan Manukyan

== Quarter-finals ==
On 12 January 2024, the Football Federation of Armenia announced the draw for the quarter-finals.

10 March 2024	Kilikia	0–1	Shirak	Yerevan
15:00 (UTC+4)	Sylla (yellow card) 37'; Wande (yellow card) 44'; Yardumyan (yellow card) 56'; Bilunga (yellow card) 61'	Report	Koné 45' (pen.); Sadoyan (yellow card) 56'; Misakyan (yellow card) 56'; R.Darbinyan (yellow card) 75'	Stadium: Junior Sports Stadium; Referee: Tiran Yeritsyan

11 March 2024	Noah	2–3	Ararat-Armenia	Abovyan
18:00 (UTC+4)	Miranyan 13' (pen.); Mathieu (yellow card) 16'; Gamboš (yellow card) 46'; Alhaft 90'	Report	Tera (yellow card) 30'; Rodríguez 37'; Duarte 62'; Serobyan 82' (pen.); Shishkovski (yellow card) 90+2'	Stadium: City Stadium; Referee: Zaven Hovhannisyan

12 March 2024	Pyunik	5–3	Van	Yerevan
15:00 (UTC+4)	Bravo 16', 87'; Juričić 29', 67'; Harutyunyan 35'	Report	Touré 3' (pen.); Sani 23'; Boniface 50' (pen.) (yellow card) 75'; Kojčić (yellow card) 83'; Manucharyan (yellow card) 85'	Stadium: Junior Sports Stadium; Referee: Artem Gasparyan

12 March 2024	Urartu	4–0	BKMA Yerevan	Yerevan
18:00 (UTC+4)	Kravchuk 6', 64'; Aghasaryan 11', 70'	Report	Sargsyan (yellow card) 31'	Stadium: Urartu Stadium; Referee: Henrik Nalbandian

== Semi–finals ==
On 13 March 2024, the Football Federation of Armenia announced the draw for the semi-finals.

8 April 2024	Pyunik	0–1	Ararat-Armenia	Yerevan
15:00 (UTC+4)	Gonçalves (yellow card) 45+2'; Villela (yellow card) 90+5'	Report	Serobyan 32'; Muradyan (yellow card) 34'; Yenne (yellow card) 45+2'; Yattara (yellow card) 90+5' (yellow-red card) 90+5'; Beglaryan (yellow card) 90+9'	Stadium: Junior Sports Stadium; Referee: Zaven Hovhannisyan

9 April 2024	Shirak	1–2	Urartu	Gyumri
19:00 (UTC+4)	R.Darbinyan (yellow card) 37'; Mryan 47' (yellow card) 90'; Vidić (yellow card) 71'; Kone (red card) 90'	Report	Kravchuk 7'; Dolgov 19' (yellow card) 90'; Stojanović (yellow card) 30' (yellow-red card) 90'; Veliez (yellow card) 48'; Gilmore (yellow card) 73'; Melikhov (yellow card) 75'	Stadium: City Stadium; Referee: Artem Gasparyan

== Final ==
12 May 2024	Ararat-Armenia	1–1 (a.e.t.) (5–3 p)	Urartu	Yerevan
18:00 (UTC+4)	Ghazaryan 38' (o.g.); Nondi (yellow card) 88'; Serobyan (yellow card) 90'; Bueno (yellow card) 120+3'	Report	Mirzoyan 31'; Aghasaryan (yellow card) 46'; Tsymbalyuk (yellow card) 65'; Margaryan (yellow card) 90+4'	Stadium: Vazgen Sargsyan Republican Stadium; Referee: Artem Gasparyan
	Penalties
	Yenne (penalty scored); Avanesyan (penalty scored); Duarte (penalty scored); Shaghoyan (penalty scored); Hovhannisyan (penalty scored)		(penalty scored) Simonyan; (penalty missed) Margaryan; (penalty scored) Piloyan; (penalty scored) Melkonyan

== Goal scorers ==
As of match played 12 May 2024

6 goals:

- (Armenia) Aleksandr Karapetyan - Kilikia

3 goals:

- (Armenia) Andranik Karapetyan - Mika
- (Armenia) Samvel Sargsyan - Syunik
- (Ukraine) Andriy Kravchuk - Urartu

2 goals:

- Artur Serobyan - Ararat-Armenia
- (Armenia) Samvel Hakobyan - BKMA Yerevan
- (Armenia) Argishti Petrosyan - BKMA Yerevan
- (Guinea) Aboubacar Mukhtar Sylla - Kilikia
- (Egypt) Khalil Hagy - Gandzasar Kapan
- (Armenia) Hovhannes Harutyunyan - Pyunik
- (Bosnia and Herzegovina) Luka Juričić - Pyunik
- (Colombia) Juan Bravo - Pyunik
- (Armenia) Narek Aghasaryan - Urartu
- (Nigeria) Christopher Boniface - Van

1 goals:

- (Argentina) Alexis Rodríguez - Ararat-Armenia
- (Brazil) Alemão - Ararat-Armenia
- (Colombia) Jonathan Duarte - Ararat-Armenia
- (Tunisia) Ayman Mahmoud - Ararat Yerevan
- (Armenia) Misak Hakobyan - BKMA Yerevan
- (Armenia) Karlen Hovhannisyan - BKMA Yerevan
- (Armenia) Serozh Titizyan - BKMA Yerevan
- (Armenia) Raffi Matevosyan - Kilikia
- (Armenia) Frunze Poghosyan - Kilikia
- (Ghana) Abu Isaac - Kilikia
- (Armenia) Sevak Manucharyan - EcoVille
- (Armenia) Orbeli Hambardzumyan - Gandzasar Kapan
- (Egypt) Saleh Nasr - Gandzasar Kapan
- (Serbia) Milan Kostic - Gandzasar Kapan
- (Armenia) Narek Martirosyan - Mika
- (Armenia) Hmayak Aleksanyan - Mika
- (Armenia) Artur Miranyan - Noah
- (Netherlands) Ilias Alhaft - Noah
- (Armenia) Armen Kirakosyan - Onor
- (Armenia) Edgar Malakyan - Pyunik
- (Netherlands) Sam Hendriks - Pyunik
- (Armenia) Lyova Mryan - Shirak
- (Ivory Coast) Mory Kone - Shirak
- (Armenia) Yura Arakelyan - Syunik
- (Armenia) Gagik Gevorgyan - Syunik
- (Armenia) Yuri Maghakyan - Syunik
- (Armenia) Davit Vardanyan - Syunik
- (Armenia) Mikayel Mirzoyan - Urartu
- (Russia) Aleksandr Dolgov - Urartu
- (Armenia) Vrezh Chiloyan - Van
- (Guinea) Momo Touré - Van
- (Nigeria) Buhari Sani - Van
- Arman Khachatryan - West Armenia
- (Tanzania) Edson Erick Mwijage - West Armenia

Own goals:

- Arman Ghazaryan - Ararat-Armenia vs Urartu 12 May 2024

== See also ==
- Football in Armenia
- 2023–24 Armenian Premier League
- 2023–24 Armenian First League
