= Oussama Bouyaghlafen =

Dutch footballer (born 1998)

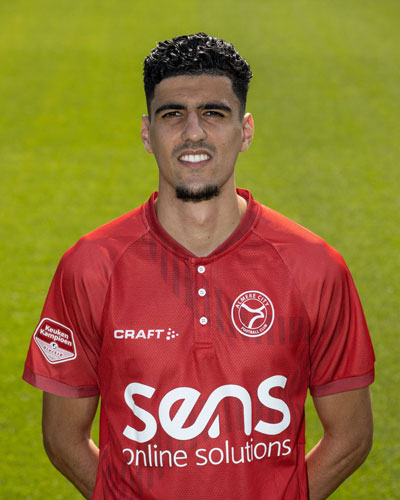
- Bouyaghlafen in 2020

Personal information
- Date of birth: 27 April 1998 (age 28)
- Place of birth: Rotterdam, Netherlands
- Height: 1.87 m (6 ft 2 in)
- Position: Winger

Team information
- Current team: RBC
- Number: 14

Youth career
- 2009–2010: Sparta AV
- 2010–2012: SVV
- 2012–2013: Alexandria '66
- 2013–2014: Willem II
- 2014–2015: Brabant United
- 2015–2016: Den Bosch

Senior career*
Years	Team	Apps	(Gls)
2016–2020	Den Bosch	73	(7)
2020–2022	Almere City	40	(4)
2022–2024	De Treffers	58	(11)
2024–2026	Kozakken Boys	20	(4)
2026–	RBC	10	(3)
- * Club domestic league appearances and goals as of 10:19, 18 November 2026 (UTC)

Oussama Bouyaghlafen (born 27 April 1998) is a Dutch footballer who plays as a winger for Derde Divisie club RBC.

== Club career ==
=== Den Bosch ===
Bouyaghlafen played youth football for Rotterdam clubs Sparta AV, SVV, Alexandria '66, before moving to the youth academy of Willem II in 2013. The following season, he joined the FC Den Bosch youth department.

He made his professional debut in the Eerste Divisie for FC Den Bosch on 21 October 2016 in 3–1 away loss to VVV-Venlo, where he came on as a substitute in the 83rd minute for Stefano Beltrame. He signed a contract extension until June 2020 with Den Bosch in December 2017, with the option of one additional year.

=== Almere City ===
In May 2020, Bouyaghlafen signed a two-year contract with Almere City. He made his debut for the club on 30 August in a 0–0 home draw against MVV, coming on as a substitute for Ilias Alhaft in the 61st minute. Half a month later, on 15 September, Bouyaghlafen scored his first goal for Almere City in a 3–0 home win over TOP Oss. Earlier in the match, he had won a penalty, setting up the 1–0 goal scored by Thomas Verheydt. With Almere City, he reached the play-offs for promotion in his first season, but the team would see themselves defeated by eventual play-off winners NEC in the first round.

After the 2021–22 season, Bouyaghlafen's contract was not extended by Almere City, and he left the club as a free agent.

=== Amateur years ===
On 25 July 2022, Bouyaghlafen joined Tweede Divisie club De Treffers.

On 20 March 2024, Kozakken Boys announced the signing of Bouyaghlafen ahead of the 2024–25 season.

On 1 February 2026, Bouyaghlafen was announced as Derde Divisie club RBC's new signing ahead of the 2026–27 season.

== Personal life ==
Born in the Netherlands, Bouyaghlafen is of Moroccan descent.
