= Aleksandar Miljković (footballer, born 1990) =

Serbian footballer (born 1990)

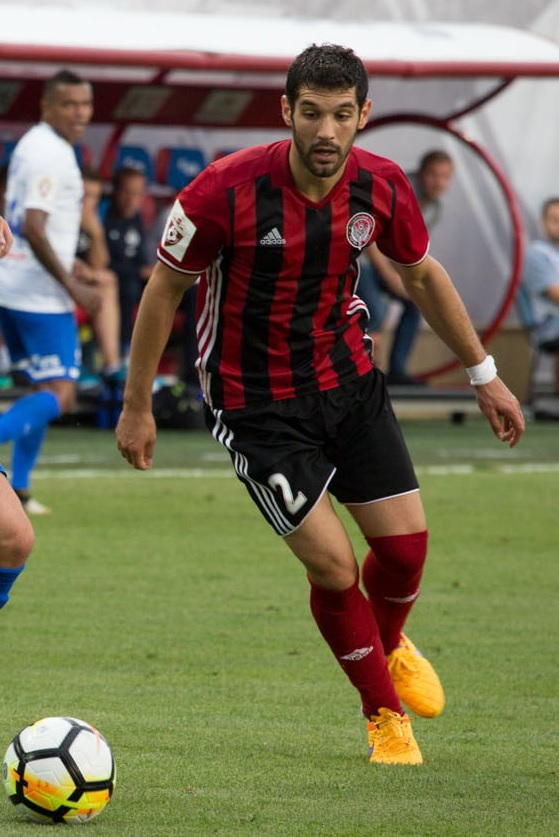
- Miljković with Amkar in 2017

Personal information
- Date of birth: 26 February 1990 (age 36)
- Place of birth: Bor, SFR Yugoslavia
- Height: 1.81 m (5 ft 11 in)
- Position: Defender

Team information
- Current team: Novi Pazar
- Number: 2

Youth career
- Bor
- 2002–2007: Partizan

Senior career*
Years	Team	Apps	(Gls)
2007–2013	Partizan	62	(2)
2007–2008	→ Teleoptik (loan)	10	(0)
2009	→ Teleoptik (loan)	15	(2)
2010	→ Metalac Gornji Milanovac (loan)	5	(1)
2013–2015	Braga	9	(0)
2013–2015	→ Braga B	6	(0)
2015–2016	RNK Split	14	(0)
2016–2018	Amkar Perm	51	(1)
2018–2019	Miedź Legnica	17	(0)
2019–2020	Alashkert	13	(0)
2020–2022	Partizan	43	(1)
2022–2023	Pyunik	26	(2)
2023–2025	Noah	45	(2)
2025–2026	Pyunik	17	(1)
2026–	Novi Pazar	8	(0)

International career
2008–2009	Serbia U19	13	(1)
2011–2012	Serbia U21	4	(0)
- * Club domestic league appearances and goals as of 27 July 2026

Aleksandar Miljković (Serbian Cyrillic: Александар Миљковић, pronounced [aleksǎːndar mǐːʎkoʋitɕ, alěksaːn-]; born 26 February 1990) is a Serbian professional footballer who plays as a defender for Serbian Superliga club Novi Pazar.

== Club career ==
Miljković has passed Partizan's youth academy after which he was transferred to FK Teleoptik to gain experience. He was promoted to Partizan senior squad along with Adem Ljajić during the 2008–09 season. He debuted against FK Čukarički on 26 October 2008. Later on, he was sent back to Teleoptik. In 2010, he was loaned to FK Metalac where he played five games and scored one goal. The next three seasons, Miljković spent as a standard member of Partizan. He also made 14 appearances for Partizan in the UEFA club competitions.

With Partizan, Miljković won four Serbian championship titles and two Serbian Cups.

On 21 June 2013, Miljković signed a four-year deal with Portuguese club Braga.

On 1 November 2018, Miljković joined Ekstraklasa side Miedź Legnica on a two-year deal.

On 28 August 2019, Miljković signed for FC Alashkert. On 27 July, Miljković was released by mutual consent from his contract with Alashkert.

On 13 August 2022, Miljković signed for Pyunik.

== International career ==
Miljković has been a member of the Serbia U19 and Serbia U21 national football teams. He debuted against Germany U19 on 31 March 2009. He made 17 appearances for both selections.

== Career statistics ==
As of match played 28 May 2025

Club	Season	League			Cup		Continental		Other		Total	
Club	Season	Division	Apps	Goals	Apps	Goals	Apps	Goals	Apps	Goals	Apps	Goals
Teleoptik (loan)	2007–08	Serbian League Belgrade	10	0	0	0	—		—		10	0
Teleoptik (loan)	2008–09	Serbian League Belgrade	2	1	—		—		—		2	1
Teleoptik (loan)	2009–10	Serbian First League	13	1	—		—		—		13	1
Teleoptik (loan)	Total		25	2	0	0	—		—		25	2
Metalac Gornji Milanovac (loan)	2009–10	Serbian SuperLiga	5	1	0	0	—		—		5	1
Partizan	2008–09	Serbian SuperLiga	1	0	1	0	2	0	—		4	0
Partizan	2010–11	Serbian SuperLiga	22	2	3	0	3	0	—		28	2
Partizan	2011–12	Serbian SuperLiga	15	0	3	0	1	0	—		19	0
Partizan	2012–13	Serbian SuperLiga	24	0	0	0	8	0	—		32	0
Partizan	Total		62	2	7	0	14	0	—		83	2
Braga	2013–14	Primeira Liga	9	0	2	0	0	0	1 (Note: One appearance in Taça da Liga)	0	12	0
Braga B	2013–14	Segunda Liga	4	0	—		—		—		4	0
Braga B	2014–15	Segunda Liga	2	0	—		—		—		2	0
Braga B	Total		6	0	—		—		—		6	0
RNK Split	2015–16	Croatian First League	14	0	0	0	—		—		14	0
Amkar Perm	2016–17	Russian Premier League	25	1	0	0	—		—		25	1
Amkar Perm	2017–18	Russian Premier League	26	0	1	0	—		1 (Note: One appearance in relegation play-offs)	0	28	0
Amkar Perm	Total		51	1	1	0	—		1	0	53	1
Miedź Legnica	2018–19	Ekstraklasa	17	0	3	0	—		—		20	0
Alashkert	2019–20	Armenian Premier League	13	0	1	0	0	0	0	0	14	0
Partizan	2020–21	Serbian SuperLiga	25	0	5	0	2	0	—		32	0
Partizan	2021–22	Serbian SuperLiga	18	1	5	0	9	0	—		32	1
Partizan	Total		43	1	10	0	11	0	—		64	1
Pyunik	2022–23	Armenian Premier League	26	2	1	0	9	0	0	0	36	2
Noah	2023–24	Armenian Premier League	31	2	2	0	0	0	0	0	33	2
Noah	2024–25	Armenian Premier League	14	0	3	0	12	2	0	0	29	2
Noah	Total		45	2	5	0	12	2	0	0	62	4
Career total			318	11	30	0	46	2	2	0	394	13

== Honours ==
Partizan

- Serbian SuperLiga: 2008–09, 2010–11, 2011–12, 2012–13
- Serbian Cup: 2008–09, 2010–11

Noah

- Armenian Cup: 2024–25
