= 2025–26 Bangkok United F.C. season =

Bangkok United F.C.
2025–26 season
- Chairman: (Thailand) Kajorn Chearavanont
- Manager: (Thailand) Totchtawan Sripan
- Stadium: True BG Stadium
Home colours	Away colours	Third colours

The 2025–26 season is Bangkok United Football Club's 17th in the new era since they took over from Bangkok University Football Club in 2009. It is the 9th season in the Thai League and the club's 15th (12th consecutive) season in the top flight of the Thai football league system since returning in the 2013 season. The team will also play in the qualifying round of the AFC Champion League Elite against Chengdu Rongde from China.

From this season, it is confirmed that they will be sharing the ground with BG Pathum United after a strategic collaboration between BG Pathum United and True Bangkok United, enabling both clubs to utilize the venue for domestic league matches and international competitions.

== Squad ==
=== Thai League 1 Squad ===
As of 17 July 2025.

Squad No.	Name	Nationality	Date of birth (age)	Last club
Goalkeepers
1	Patiwat Khammai	(Thailand)	24 December 1994 (age 31)	(Thailand) Samut Prakan City
29	Phuwadol Pholsongkram	(Thailand)	11 May 2002 (age 24)	(Thailand) Ayutthaya United
38	Chinnapong Raksri	(Thailand)	14 April 1995 (age 31)	(Thailand) Kanchanaburi Power
88	Supanut Sudathip	(Thailand)	22 June 2006 (age 20)	(Thailand) Burapha United
Defenders
3	Everton Gonçalves (C)	(Brazil)	5 February 1990 (age 36)	(Thailand) Chiangrai United
4	Manuel Bihr	(Thailand) (Germany)	17 August 1993 (age 32)	(Germany) Stuttgarter Kickers
5	Philipe Maia	(Brazil)	11 July 1995 (age 31)	(Saudi Arabia) Al-Adalah
6	Nitipong Selanon	(Thailand)	25 May 1993 (age 33)	(Thailand) Chiangrai United
21	Pratama Arhan	(Indonesia)	21 December 2001 (age 24)	(South Korea) Suwon
23	Lee Ki-je	(South Korea)	9 July 1991 (age 35)	(Iran) Mes Rafsanjan
24	Wanchai Jarunongkran	(Thailand)	18 December 1996 (age 29)	(Thailand) Police Tero
26	Suphan Thongsong	(Thailand)	26 August 1994 (age 31)	(Thailand) Suphanburi
36	Jakkapan Praisuwan	(Thailand)	16 August 1994 (age 31)	(Thailand) Muangthong United
43	Surachai Booncharee	(Thailand)	26 April 2007 (age 19)	Youth Team
52	Wichan Inaram	(Thailand) (Nigeria)	20 July 2007 (age 18)	Youth Team
53	Nontapat Ploymee	(Thailand)	6 February 2006 (age 20)	Youth Team
96	Boontawee Theppawong	(Thailand)	2 January 1996 (age 30)	(Thailand) Muangthong United
Midfielders
8	Wisarut Imura	(Thailand)	18 October 1997 (age 28)	(Thailand) Air Force United
11	Rungrath Poomchantuek	(Thailand)	17 May 1992 (age 34)	(Thailand) Ratchaburi
18	Thitiphan Puangchan	(Thailand)	1 September 1993 (age 32)	(Thailand) BG Pathum United
27	Weerathep Pomphan	(Thailand)	19 September 1996 (age 29)	(Thailand) Muangthong United
33	Nebojša Kosović (Note: Kosović registered for ACL2 & Shopee Cup only)	(Montenegro)	24 February 1995 (age 31)	(Saudi Arabia) Al-Tai
37	Picha Autra	(Thailand)	7 January 1996 (age 30)	(Malaysia) Selangor
39	Pokklaw Anan	(Thailand)	4 March 1991 (age 35)	(Thailand) Chonburi
56	Krit Kliangpan	(Thailand)	13 February 2006 (age 20)	Youth Team
57	Aekkarat Sansuwan	(Thailand)	8 June 2006 (age 20)	Youth Team
58	Patchara Wangsawat	(Thailand)	4 September 2007 (age 18)	Youth Team
99	Pichaiya Kongsri	(Thailand)	3 August 2007 (age 18)	Youth Team
Strikers
7	Rivaldinho	(Brazil) (Spain)	29 April 1995 (age 31)	(China) Qingdao Red Lions
10	Teerasil Dangda	(Thailand)	6 June 1988 (age 38)	(Thailand) BG Pathum United
16	Muhsen Al-Ghassani	(Oman)	27 March 1997 (age 29)	(Oman) Al-Seeb Club
17	Seia Kunori	(Japan)	31 March 2001 (age 25)	(Singapore) BG Tampines Rovers
19	Chayawat Srinawong	(Thailand)	12 January 1993 (age 33)	(Thailand) Samut Prakan City
20	Guntapon Keereeleang	(Thailand)	22 January 2001 (age 25)	(Thailand) Rayong
30	Richairo Zivkovic	(Netherlands) (Curaçao)	15 September 1996 (age 29)	(Singapore) Lion City Sailors
32	Narakorn Kangkratok	(Thailand)	1 April 2003 (age 23)	(Thailand) Ayutthaya United
54	Achita Nawathit	(Thailand)	9 March 2007 (age 19)	Youth Team
55	Thanawat Deelert	(Thailand)	1 January 2007 (age 19)	Youth Team
70	Arthur Moura	(Brazil)	22 August 2000 (age 25)	(South Korea) Hwaseong FC
97	Ilias Alhaft	(Netherlands) (Morocco) (Indonesia)	23 February 1997 (age 29)	(Netherlands) SC Cambuur
Players loaned out during season
7	Anon Amornlerdsak	(Thailand)	6 November 1997 (age 28)	(Thailand) Port
35	Passakorn Biaothungoi (M)	(Thailand)	1 April 2000 (age 26)	(Thailand) Ayutthaya United
44	Natcha Promsomboon (M)	(Thailand)	8 February 2001 (age 25)	(Thailand) Ayutthaya United
50	Bhumchanok Kamkla (D)	(Thailand)	16 March 2004 (age 22)	(Thailand) Ayutthaya United
51	Kritsada Nontharat	(Thailand)	16 February 2001 (age 25)	(Thailand) Trat
59	Chukid Wanpraphao	(Thailand)	2 July 2001 (age 25)	(Thailand) Ayutthaya United
90	Philip Bijawat Frey	(Thailand) (Germany)	25 November 2006 (age 19)	Youth Team
Players left during season
7	Luka Adžić	(Serbia)	17 September 1998 (age 27)	(Serbia) FK Čukarički
14	Kyoga Nakamura	(Singapore) (Japan)	25 April 1996 (age 30)	(Singapore) BG Tampines Rovers

=== U21 Squad ===
As of 17 July 2025.

Squad No.	Name	Nationality	Date of birth (age)	Last club
Goalkeepers
25	Naphol Wongboon	(Thailand)	26 April 2004 (age 22)	Youth Team
Defenders
2	Wichan Inaram	(Thailand) (Nigeria)	20 July 2007 (age 18)	Youth Team
3	Siravich Chaiworamukkul	(Thailand)		Youth Team
4	Purich Subhensawang	(Thailand)	1 February 2007 (age 19)	Youth Team
5	Setthaphong Sathorn	(Thailand)		Youth Team
6	Kongpop Sodsong	(Thailand)		Youth Team
15	Warakoan Huatwiset	(Thailand)	28 October 2005 (age 20)	Youth Team
17	Chonlachart Tongjinda	(Thailand)		Youth Team
21	Thanakorn Duangpang	(Thailand)		Youth Team
22	Nontapat Ploymee	(Thailand)	6 February 2006 (age 20)	Youth Team
23	Surachai Booncharee	(Thailand)	26 April 2007 (age 19)	Youth Team
Midfielders
7	Krit Kliangpan	(Thailand)	13 February 2006 (age 20)	Youth Team
8	Sirayos Dansakul	(Thailand)		Youth Team
13	Patchara Wangsawat	(Thailand)	4 September 2007 (age 18)	Youth Team
14	Supakan Binsaha	(Thailand)		Youth Team
16	Pichaiya Kongsri	(Thailand)	3 August 2007 (age 18)	Youth Team
18	Aekkarat Sansuwan	(Thailand)	8 June 2006 (age 20)	Youth Team
19	Mirako Inaram	(Thailand) (Nigeria)		Youth Team
20	Nutthakit Senanorit	(Thailand)		Youth Team
Strikers
9	Thanawat Deelert	(Thailand)	1 January 2007 (age 19)	Youth Team
10	Nopparat Promiem	(Thailand)	1 August 2004 (age 21)	Youth Team
11	Achita Nawathit	(Thailand)	9 March 2007 (age 19)	Youth Team
Players on loan
1	Supanut Sudathip	(Thailand)	22 June 2006 (age 20)	Youth Team
3	Anaphat Nakngam	(Thailand)	9 July 2004 (age 22)	Youth Team
14	Shunta Hasegawa	(Thailand) (Japan)	25 April 2005 (age 21)	Youth Team
16	Philip Bijawat Frey	(Thailand) (Germany)	25 November 2006 (age 19)	Youth Team

== Coaching staff ==
Position	Staff
Team Manager	(Thailand) Suradej Anandapong
Head coach	(Thailand) Totchtawan Sripan
Assistant coach	(Thailand) Panupong Wongsa
Assistant coach	(Thailand) Sarif Sainui
Goalkeeping coach	(Thailand) Peerasit Mahothon
Assistant goalkeeper coach	(Thailand) Kittinan Chockcharoenlarp
Physical & Fitness coaches	(Thailand) Watcharachai Rajphaetyakhom
Physical & Fitness coaches	(Thailand) Tosaphon Doungjai
Head of Medicine	(Brazil) Janilson Quadros da silva
Physiotherapist	(Thailand) Mongkhon Saethao
Interpreter	(Thailand) Nuttapat Lertchanapisit
Team's Staff	(Thailand) Chatchai Phuengthong
Team's Staff	(Thailand) Ayuwat Duangin
Director of academy	(Australia) Danny Invincibile
Under-23s lead coach	(Thailand) Jirawat Lainananukul

== Transfer ==
=== Pre-season transfer ===
==== In ====
Date	Position	Player	Transferred from	Ref
First team
1 June 2025	GK	(Thailand) Phuwadol Pholsongkram	(Thailand) Ayutthaya United	Loan Return
1 June 2025	DF	(Thailand) Bhumchanok Kamkla	(Thailand) Ayutthaya United	Loan Return
1 June 2025	DF	(Thailand) Pakkapol Maimard	(Thailand) Ayutthaya United	Loan Return
1 June 2025	MF	(Thailand) Passakorn Biaothungoi	(Thailand) Ayutthaya United	Loan Return
1 June 2025	MF	(Thailand) Natcha Promsomboon	(Thailand) Ayutthaya United	Loan Return
1 June 2025	FW	(Thailand) Chukid Wanpraphao	(Thailand) Ayutthaya United	Loan Return
1 June 2025	MF	(Thailand) Anon Amornlerdsak	(Thailand) Port	Loan Return
1 June 2025	DF	(Thailand) Putthinan Wannasri	(Thailand) Rayong	Loan Return
1 June 2025	FW	(Thailand) Guntapon Keereeleang	(Thailand) Rayong	Loan Return
6 June 2025	GK	(Thailand) Chinnapong Raksri	(Thailand) Kanchanaburi Power	Free
26 June 2025	DF	(Brazil) Philipe Maia	(Saudi Arabia) Al-Adalah (S2)	Free
27 June 2025	FW	(Japan) Seia Kunori	(Singapore) BG Tampines Rovers (S1)	Free
28 June 2025	FW	(Netherlands) (Morocco) (Indonesia) Ilias Alhaft	(Netherlands) SC Cambuur (N1)	Free
30 June 2025	MF	(Singapore) (Japan) Kyoga Nakamura	(Singapore) BG Tampines Rovers (S1)	Undisclosed
2 July 2025	FW	(Thailand) Teerasil Dangda	(Thailand) BG Pathum United	Free
5 September 2025	MF	(Montenegro) Nebojša Kosović	(Saudi Arabia) Al-Tai (S1)	Free

==== Out ====
Date	Position	Player	Transferred To	Ref
First team
31 May 2025	GK	(Thailand) Warut Mekmusik	(Thailand) Ayutthaya United	Free
31 May 2025	GK	(Thailand) Supanut Suadsong	(Thailand) Burapha United	Free
31 May 2025	DF	(Thailand) Putthinan Wannasri	(Thailand) Chanthaburi	Free
31 May 2025	DF	(Thailand) Peerapat Notchaiya	(Thailand) Kanchanaburi Power	Free
31 May 2025	MF	(Thailand) Thossawat Limwannasathian	(Thailand) Ratchaburi	Free
31 May 2025	MF	(Thailand) Pakkapol Maimard	(Thailand)	Free
31 May 2025	FW	(Palestine) (Sweden) Mahmoud Eid	(Vietnam) Nam Dinh (V1)	Free
17 June 2025	MF	(Lebanon) (Denmark) Bassel Jradi	(Cyprus) AEL Limassol (C1)	Free
30 June 2025	DF	(Thailand) Kritsada Nontharat	(Thailand) Rayong	Season loan
7 July 2025	MF	(Thailand) Anon Amornlerdsak	(Thailand) Rayong	Season loan
7 July 2025	FW	(Thailand) Chukid Wanpraphao	(Thailand) Pattani	Season loan
8 July 2025	DF	(Thailand) Bhumchanok Kamkla	(Thailand) Ayutthaya United	Season loan
8 July 2025	MF	(Thailand) Passakorn Biaothungoi	(Thailand) Ayutthaya United	Season loan
22 July 2025	DF	(Thailand) Anaphat Nakngam	(Thailand) Customs United	Season loan
22 July 2025	MF	(Thailand) (Japan) Shunta Hasegawa	(Thailand) Customs United	Season loan
22 July 2025	FW	(Thailand) (Germany) Philip Bijawat Frey	(Thailand) Bangkok	Season loan
26 July 2025	FW	(Thailand) Kantinan Chanmunti	(Thailand) Mahasarakham SBT (T2)	Free

=== Mid-season transfer ===
==== In ====
Date	Position	Player	Transferred from	Ref
First team
6 January 2026	FW	(Brazil) (Spain) Rivaldinho	(China) Qingdao Red Lions (C3)	Free
8 January 2026	FW	(Brazil) Arthur Moura	(South Korea) Hwaseong FC (K2)	Free
16 January 2026	MF	(Thailand) Picha Autra	(Malaysia) Selangor (M1)	Season loan
13 April 2026	DF	(South Korea) Lee Ki-je	(Iran) Mes Rafsanjan (I1)	Free

==== Out ====
Date	Position	Player	Transferred To	Ref
First team
5 January 2026	FW	(Serbia) Luka Adžić	(Singapore) Lion City Sailors (S1)	Free
6 January 2026	MF	(Singapore) (Japan) Kyoga Nakamura	(Singapore) Lion City Sailors (S1)	Free
6 January 2026	FW	(Thailand) Chonlachart Tongjinda	(Thailand) Nakhon Si United	Season loan
9 January 2026	GK	(Thailand) Chanasorn Kaewyos	(Thailand) BG Pathum United	Free
16 January 2026	MF	(Thailand) Natcha Promsomboon	(Thailand) Ayutthaya United	Season Loan
Academy
12 January 2026	GK	(Thailand) Supanut Sudathip	(Thailand) Burapha United	Season Loan
18 January 2026	DF	(Thailand) Warakoan Huatwiset	(Thailand) Bangkok	Season Loan
18 January 2026	FW	(Thailand) Nopparat Promiem	(Thailand) Bangkok	Season Loan

== Pre-season and friendlies ==
Win Draw Loss

19 July 2025	Bangkok United (Thailand)	–	(Thailand) Ayutthaya United	Pathum Thani
				Stadium: True BG Stadium

== Competitions ==
=== Overview ===
Competition	First match	Last match	Starting round	Final position	Record							
Competition	First match	Last match	Starting round	Final position	Pld	W	D	L	GF	GA	GD	Win %
Thai League 1	17 August 2025		Matchday 1		26	12	9	5	37	27	+10	46.15
Thai FA Cup	30 October 2025	25 February 2026	First round	Quarter-finals	4	3	0	1	14	3	+11	75.00
Thai League Cup	28 December 2025	21 January 2026	First round	Second round	2	1	1	0	5	2	+3	50.00
AFC Champions League Elite	12 August 2025		Qualifying play-offs	Qualifying play-offs	1	0	0	1	0	3	−3	0.00
AFC Champions League Two	18 September 2025	15 April 2026	Group stage	Semi-finals	12	6	3	3	17	15	+2	50.00
ASEAN Club Championship	25 September 2025		Group stage		4	1	1	2	5	11	−6	25.00
Total					49	23	14	12	78	61	+17	46.94

Last updated: 18 April 2026
Source: Competitions

=== Thai League 1 ===
==== Matches ====
Win Draw Loss

17 August 2025 1	Bangkok United	3–2	Rayong	Pathum Thani
	Seia Kunori 69', 71'; Teerasil Dangda 85'; Richairo Zivkovic (yellow card) 90+4'		Stênio Júnior 77', 87'; Mehti Sarakham (yellow card) 39'; Veljko Filipović (yellow card) 79'	Stadium: True BG Stadium; Attendance: 2,032; Referee: Warintorn Sassadee

24 August 2025 2	Kanchanaburi Power	3–3	Bangkok United	Kanchanaburi
	Mohamed Mara 45+7' (yellow card) 11'; Gerson Rodrigues 76'; Chenrop Samphaodi 79'; Ezequiel Agüero (yellow card) 57'; Satsanapong Wattayuchutikul (yellow card) 89'		Richairo Zivkovic 27', 83' (yellow card) 90+6'; Seia Kunori 45'; Rungrath Phumichantuk (yellow card) 24' (yellow-red card) 58'	Stadium: Kanchanaburi Province Stadium; Attendance: 4,095; Referee: Kotchapoom Meesridaecha

30 August 2025 3	Bangkok United	2–1	BG Pathum United	Pathum Thani
	Pokklaw Anan 88'; Ilias Alhaft 90'		Ekanit Panya 65'	Stadium: Thammasat Stadium (Note: Match switch to Thammasat Stadium due to refurbishment of True BG Stadium); Attendance: 4,097; Referee: Torphong Somsing

13 September 2025 4	Chonburi	0–1	Bangkok United	Chonburi
	Jorge Fellipe (yellow card) 37'; Greg Houla (yellow card) 51'; Adisak Kraisorn (yellow card) 90+1'		Muhsen Al-Ghassani 90+17' (pen.); Pokklaw Anan (yellow card) 60'; Thitiphan Puangchan (yellow card) 70'; Teerasil Dangda (penalty missed) 80	Stadium: Chonburi Stadium; Attendance: 6,187; Referee: Akom Charoensuk

21 September 2025 5	Bangkok United	1–2	Buriram United	Pathum Thani
	Richairo Zivkovic 23'; Philipe Maia (yellow card) 90+4'		Supachai Chaided 8'; Fejsal Mulić 45+3'; Pansa Hemviboon (yellow card) 81'; Theerathon Bunmathan (yellow card) 90+4'	Stadium: True BG Stadium; Attendance: 6,329; Referee: Wiwat Jumpaoon

28 September 2025 6	Ratchaburi	0–1	Bangkok United	Ratchaburi
	Gabriel Mutombo Kupa (yellow card) 39'; Jonathan Khemdee (yellow card) 72'		Richairo Živković 19' (yellow card) 47'; Jakkapan Praisuwan (yellow card) 52'; Pokklaw Anan (yellow card) 83'	Stadium: Ratchaburi Stadium; Attendance: 4,159; Referee: Songkran Bunmeekiart

5 October 2025 7	Bangkok United	3–1	Nakhon Ratchasima	Pathum Thani
	Muhsen Al-Ghassani 36'; Nenad Lalić 83' (o.g.); Teerasil Dangda 88'; Everton (yellow card) 80'		Hirotaka Mita 44' (pen.); Anurak Mungdee (yellow card) 56'; Nathaphop Kaewklang (yellow card) 90+6'	Stadium: True BG Stadium; Attendance: 1,279; Referee: Noppadet Mangngam

18 October 2025 8	Muangthong United	0–0	Bangkok United	Nonthaburi
	Tristian Do (yellow card) 55'			Stadium: Thunderdome Stadium; Attendance: 5,178; Referee: Songkran Bunmeekiart

26 October 2025 9	Bangkok United	4–3	Lamphun Warriors	Pathum Thani
	Nuttee Noiwilai 3' (o.g.); Pokklaw Anan 45+4'; Teerasil Dangda 90+4'; Muhsen Al-Ghassani 90+6'		Mohammed Osman 32'; Maung Maung Lwin 47'; Anan Yodsangwal 77'; Akarapong Pumwisat (yellow card) 90+2'	Stadium: True BG Stadium; Attendance: 1,088; Referee: Panumas Phansamo

2 November 2025 10	Bangkok United	1–2	Uthai Thani	Pathum Thani
	Seia Kunori 43'; Muhsen Al-Ghassani (red card) 14'		Bruno Baio 51', 83' (yellow card) 90+3'	Stadium: True BG Stadium; Attendance: 1,211; Referee: Anusorn Nookaew

9 November 2025 11	Port	0–0	Bangkok United	Bangkok
	Suphanan Bureerat (yellow card) 35'; Kaká Mendes (yellow card) 43'; Teerasak Poeiphimai (yellow card) 68'; Chaiyawat Buran (yellow card) 90'		Pokklaw A-nan (yellow card) 31'	Stadium: PAT Stadium; Attendance: 5,711; Referee: Sivakorn Pu-Udom

22 November 2025 12	Bangkok United	4–1	PT Prachuap	Pathum Thani
	Seia Kunori 12'; Guntapon Keereeleang 45+2'; Muhsen Al-Ghassani 64'; Kyoga Nakamura 87'; Everton (yellow card) 67'		Rodrigo 90+6'; Airton (yellow card) 89'	Stadium: True BG Stadium; Attendance: 2,003; Referee: Peerasan Krataithong

30 November 2025 13	Sukhothai	0–0	Bangkok United	Sukhothai
	Ratchanat Arunyapairot (yellow card) 70'; Lursan Theemrat (yellow card) 84'; Chaiyaphon Otton (yellow card) 90+2'		Guntapon Keereeleang (yellow card) 37'; Philipe Maia (yellow card) 57'; Nitipong Selanon (yellow card) 82'	Stadium: Thalay Luang Stadium; Attendance: 4,626; Referee: Woottipong Ketkam

7 December 2025 14	Bangkok United	1–1	Chiangrai United	Pathum Thani
	Teerasil Dangda 82'		Victor Cardozo 90+3'; Piyaphon Phanitchakun (yellow card) 90+7'	Stadium: True BG Stadium; Attendance: 1,123; Referee: Kitisak Pikunngoen

14 December 2025 15	Ayutthaya United	3–1	Bangkok United	Ayutthaya
	Philipe Maia 47' (o.g.); Caíque Lemes 66'; Diego Carioca 90+12' (yellow card) 90+13'; Airfan Doloh (yellow card) 79'; Chakkit Laptrakul (yellow card) 90+10'		Everton Goncalves 42' (yellow card) 20' (yellow-red card) 90+7'; Weerathep Pomphan (yellow card) 45+3'	Stadium: Ayutthaya Province Stadium; Attendance: 3,276; Referee: Wiwat Jumpaoon

10 January 2026 16	Bangkok United	1–1	Kanchanaburi Power	Pathum Thani
	Philipe Maia 55'; Seia Kunori (yellow card) 65'; Nitipong Selanon (yellow card) 69'; Thitipan Puangchan (yellow card) 73'; Pokklaw Anan (yellow card) 90+5'		Chayapipat Supunpasuch 29' (yellow card) 45+1'; Gerson Rodrigues (yellow card) 61'; Ryhan Stewart (yellow card) 62'; Peerapat Notchaiya (yellow card) 75'; Sergio Aguero (red card) 83'	Stadium: True BG Stadium; Attendance: 1,257; Referee: Chaireag Ngam-som

18 January 2026 17	BG Pathum United	0–1	Bangkok United	Pathum Thani
	Warinthon Jamnongwat (red card) 28'; Waris Choolthong (red card) 43'; Chatmongkol Thongkiri (yellow card) 82'		Ilias Alhaft 54' (yellow card) 70'; Wanchai Jarunongkran (yellow card) 45'; Pratama Arhan (yellow card) 68'	Stadium: True BG Stadium; Attendance: 9,307; Referee: Songkran Bunmeekiart

24 January 2026 18	Bangkok United	1–0	Chonburi	Pathum Thani
	Nebojša Kosović 49'; Pokklaw Anan (yellow card) 32'		Rachata Moraksa (yellow card) 29'; Jonathan Bolingi (yellow card) 82'; Richmond Darko (yellow card) 85'; Nattapong Sayriya (yellow card) 86'	Stadium: True BG Stadium; Attendance: 1,622; Referee: Sarayut Jakngoen

1 February 2026 19	Buriram United	0–2	Bangkok United	Buriram
	Guilherme Bissoli (yellow card) 50'; Thanakrit Chotmuangpak (yellow card) 63'		Rivaldinho 8'; Arthur Moura 88'; Picha Autra (yellow card) 27'; Thitipan Puangchan (yellow card) 30'; Philipe Maia (yellow card) 61'; Nebojša Kosović (yellow card) 84'; Rungrath Poomchantuek (yellow card) 90+4'	Stadium: Chang Arena; Attendance: 14,718; Referee: Sivakorn Pu-Udom

18 April 2026 20 (Rescheduled)	Bangkok United	1–4	Ratchaburi	Nonthaburi
	Rivaldinho 62'; Muhsen Al-Ghassani (yellow card) 79'		Njiva Rakotoharimalala 3'; Denílson 15'; Tana 90+2', 90+6' (yellow card) 53'; Adisorn Promrak (red card) 45+6'; Negueba (yellow card) 62'	Stadium: Thunderdome Stadium (Note: Match switch to Thunderdome Stadium due to refurbishment of True BG Stadium); Attendance: 1,505; Referee: Natee Choosuwan

11 April 2026 21 (Rescheduled)	Nakhon Ratchasima	1–0	Bangkok United	Nakhon Ratchasima
	Hirotaka Mita 77'; Sarawut Inpan (yellow card) 22'		Surachai Booncharee (red card) 42'; Nenad Lalić (yellow card) 45+4'; Pichaiya Kongsri (yellow card) 79'; Rivaldinho (yellow card) 89+1'	Stadium: 80th Birthday Stadium; Attendance: 1,592; Referee: Songkran Bunmeekiart

22 February 2026 22	Bangkok United	2–0	Muangthong United	Pathum Thani
	Nebojša Kosović 3', 47'		Willian Popp (yellow card) 27'; Siradanai Phosri (yellow card) 29'	Stadium: True BG Stadium; Attendance: 2,285; Referee: Warintorn Sassadee

28 February 2026 23	Lamphun Warriors	1–1	Bangkok United	Lamphun
	Willen Mota 12'; Wittaya Moonwong (yellow card) 47'		Philipe Maia 90+7'; Everton (yellow card) 4'; Wanchai Jarunongkran (yellow card) 67'; Weerathep Pomphan (yellow card) 75'	Stadium: Lamphun Province Stadium; Attendance: 2,969; Referee: Alongkorn Khonwai

29 April 2026 24 (Rescheduled)	Uthai Thani	1–1	Bangkok United	Uthai Thani
	Marcelo Djaló 43' (yellow card) 10'; Ben Davies (penalty missed) 18; Chirawat Wangthaphan (yellow card) 52'		Philipe Maia 80'	Stadium: Uthai Thani Province Stadium; Attendance: 2,252; Referee: Chaireag Ngam-som

15 March 2026 25	Bangkok United	1–1	Port	Pathum Thani
	Rivaldinho 45+4'; Everton (yellow card) 47'; Wanchai Jarunongkran (yellow card) 60'; Patiwat Khammai (red card) 67'		Matheus Lins 90+4'; Suphanan Bureerat (yellow card) 71'; Irfan Fandi (yellow card) 86'	Stadium: True BG Stadium; Attendance: 2,292; Referee: Warintorn Sassadee

22 March 2026 26	PT Prachuap	0–0	Bangkok United	Prachuap Khiri Khan
	Wanchat Choosong (yellow card) 45+6'; Phon-Ek Maneekorn Jensen (yellow card) 56'; Michel (yellow card) 90+6'		Nitipong Selanon (yellow card) 34'; Wanchai Jarunongkran (yellow card) 60'; Muhsen Al Ghassani (yellow card) 82'; Jakkaphan Praisuwan (yellow card) 90+4'; Everton (yellow card) 90+6'	Stadium: Sam Ao Stadium; Attendance: 3,217; Referee: Woottipong Ketkam

3 April 2026 27 (Rescheduled)	Bangkok United	2–0	Sukhothai	Nonthaburi
	Thitiphan Puangchan 14', 57'; Wisarut Imura (yellow card) 72'			Stadium: Thunderdome Stadium (Note: Match switch to Thunderdome Stadium due to refurbishment of True BG Stadium); Referee: Sivakorn Pu-Udom

25 April 2026 28	Chiangrai United	2–0	Bangkok United	Chiangrai
	Itsuki Enomoto 41', 45+3'; Marco Ballini (red card) 50'		Wanchai Jarunongkran (yellow card) 40'	Stadium: Singha Chiangrai Stadium; Attendance: 4,488; Referee: Wiwat Jumpaoon

2 May 2026 29	Bangkok United	4–1	Ayutthaya United	Pathum Thani
	Arthur Moura 49'; Muhsen Al-Ghassani 58'; Ilias Alhaft 85'; Teerasil Dangda 90+5'		Sanrawat Dechmitr 88' (yellow card) 90'; Diego Carioca (yellow card) 80'	Stadium: True BG Stadium; Referee: Warintorn Sassadee

10 May 2026 30	Rayong	1–1	Bangkok United	Rayong
	Wattanapong Withunat 68'; João Afonso (yellow card) 40'; Peerapat Kaminthong (yellow card) 49'; Weslen Junior (yellow card) 52'; Saharat Pongsuwan (yellow card) 90'		Muhsen Al-Ghassani 45+3'; Pokklaw Anan (yellow card) 52'; Philipe Maia (yellow card) 72'	Stadium: Rayong Province Stadium; Referee: Torphong Somsing

Pos	Team	Pld	W	D	L	GF	GA	GD	Pts	Qualification or relegation
3	Ratchaburi	30	18	5	7	55	30	+25	59	Qualification to the AFC Champions League Elite League stage and ASEAN Club Championship group stage
4	BG Pathum United	30	14	10	6	45	29	+16	52	Qualification for AFC Champions League Two group stage
5	Bangkok United	30	13	11	6	43	32	+11	50	
6	PT Prachuap	30	11	12	7	39	37	+2	45	
7	Chiangrai United	30	9	13	8	36	37	−1	40	

Source: Thai League 1 2025–26
Rules for classification: 1) Points; 2) Goal difference; 3) Goals scored.

=== Thai FA Cup ===
Win Draw Loss

29 October 2025 Rd of 64	Bangkok United	7–0	Samut Sakhon City (T3)	Pathum Thani
	Everton Gonçalves 25'; Pokklaw Anan 35'; Teerasil Dangda 39', 45+1'; Wanchai Jarunongkran 56'; Narakhorn Kangkratok 60'; Guntapon Keereeleang 82'		Nattakan Katrugs (yellow card) 32'; Jeerapat Putthapan (yellow card) 67'; Chaiyut Srirat (yellow card) 72'	Stadium: True BG Stadium; Attendance: 424; Referee: Noppadet Mangngam

21 December 2025 Rd of 32	Port	0–3; Awarded (Note: The match, originally won 2–0 by Port, was forfeited and awarded 3–0 to Bangkok United by the Thai League Disciplinary Committee, as Port fielded more than the allowed number of foreigners)	Bangkok United	Bangkok
	Peeradol Chamratsamee 20'; Teerasak Poeiphimai 42' (yellow card) 72'; Peerawat Akkratum (yellow card) 35'; Chaiyawat Buran (yellow card) 79'; Rebin Sulaka (yellow card) 82'; Brayan Perea (yellow card) 85'		Kaka Mendes (yellow card) 35'; Thitipan Puangchan (yellow card) 65'; Wanchai Jarunongkran (yellow card) 85'	Stadium: PAT Stadium; Attendance: 3,092; Referee: Peerasan Krataithong

14 January 2026 Rd of 16	Bangkok United	3–1	Kanchanaburi Power	Pathum Thani
	Thitiphan Puangchan 24'; Muhsen Al-Ghassani 31'; Everton Goncalves 62'; Weerathep Pomphan (yellow card) 47'		Aboubakar Kamara 50'; Santipap Ratniyom (yellow card) 60'	Stadium: True BG Stadium; Attendance: 1,069; Referee: Mongkolchai Pechsri

25 February 2026 Quarter Final	Lamphun Warriors	2–1 (a.e.t.)	Bangkok United	Lamphun
	Anan Yodsangwal 43'; Peniel Mlapa 103' (yellow card) 120+2'; Jonas Schwabe (yellow card) 21'; Kenshiro Daniels (yellow card) 31'		Rivaldinho 29'; Suphan Thongsong (yellow card) 49'; Muhsen Al Ghassani (yellow card) 111'	Stadium: Lamphun Province Stadium; Attendance: 548; Referee: Peerasan Krataithong

=== Thai League Cup ===
28 December 2025 Rd of 32	(T2) Pattaya United	0–3	Bangkok United	Chonburi
	Nawaphonn Sonkham (yellow card) 90+3'		Teerasil Dangda 58', 90+5'; Ilias Alhaft 78'; Philipe Maia (yellow card) 57'	Stadium: Nong Prue Stadium; Attendance: 1,875; Referee: Chaikrit Inboonsong

21 January 2026 Rd of 16	(T2) Khon Kaen United	2–2 (a.e.t.) (4–3 p)	Bangkok United	Khon Kaen
	Chitsanuphong Choti 76' (yellow card) 75'; Amadou Ouattara 109' (yellow card) 113'; Kittichai Yaidee (yellow card) 119'		Teerasil Dangda 90+3'; Seia Kunori 119'; Pokklaw A-nan (yellow card) 29'	Stadium: Khon Kaen PAO. Stadium; Referee: Natee Choosuwan
	Penalties
	Felipe da Silva Amorim (penalty scored); Jiradet Taichankong (penalty scored); Nopphon Phonkam (penalty missed); Suwit Paipromrat (penalty scored); Amadou Ouattara (penalty scored)		Guntapon Keereeleang (penalty scored); Rivaldo (penalty scored); Everton (penalty missed); Thitipan Puangchan (penalty scored); Wanchai Jarunongkran (penalty missed)

=== AFC Champions League Elite ===
==== Qualifying stage ====
12 August 2025 Playoff	Chengdu Rongcheng (China)	3–0 (a.e.t.) (– p)	(Thailand) Bangkok United	Chengdu, China
	Yang Mingyang 68' (yellow card) 59'; Felipe 71', 83'; Li Yang (yellow card) 59'		Kyoga Nakamura (yellow card) 89'	Stadium: Phoenix Hill Football Stadium; Attendance: 41,713; Referee: Alex King (Australia)

=== AFC Champions League Two ===
==== Group stage ====
Pos	Team	Pld	W	D	L	GF	GA	GD	Pts	Qualification	PSB	BKU	LCS	SEL
1	(Indonesia) Persib	6	4	1	1	11	6	+5	13	Advance to round of 16	—	1–0	1–1	2–0
2	(Thailand) Bangkok United	6	3	1	2	8	7	+1	10 (Note: Head-to-head points: Bangkok United 6, Lion City Sailors 0.)	Advance to round of 16	0–2	—	1–0	1–1
3	(Singapore) Lion City Sailors	6	3	1	2	10	8	+2	10		3–2	1–2	—	4–2
4	(Malaysia) Selangor	6	0	1	5	7	15	−8	1		2–3	2–4	0–1	—

Source: ACL2
Rules for classification: Tiebreakers
Notes:

18 September 2025 1	Selangor (Malaysia)	2–4	(Thailand) Bangkok United	Shah Alam, Malaysia
	Chrigor 23'; Izwan Yuslan 73'; Harith Haiqal (red card) 39'; Richmond Ankrah (yellow card) 87'	Report	Ilias Alhaft 11', 25'; Muhsen Al-Ghassani 15'; Philipe Maia 83' (yellow card) 45+3'; Seia Kunori (yellow card) 67'	Stadium: Shah Alam Stadium; Attendance: 3,497; Referee: Mooud Bonyadifard (Iran)

1 October 2025 2	Bangkok United (Thailand)	0–2	(Indonesia) Persib	Pathum Thani, Thailand
	Pratama Arhan (yellow card) 40'	Report	Andrew Jung 42'; Uilliam Barros 71'; Wiliam Marcílio (yellow card) 85'	Stadium: True BG Stadium; Attendance: 1,427; Referee: Omar Al-Yaqoubi (Oman)

23 October 2025 3	Bangkok United (Thailand)	1–0	(Singapore) Lion City Sailors	Pathum Thani, Thailand
	Muhsen Al-Ghassani 63' (pen.); Richairo Zivkovic (penalty missed) 11	Report	Hariss Harun (red card) 62'; Song Ui-young (yellow card) 79'; Bailey Wright (yellow card) 88'	Stadium: True BG Stadium; Attendance: 1,006; Referee: Casey Reibelt (Australia)

6 November 2025 4	Lion City Sailors (Singapore)	1–2	(Thailand) Bangkok United	Bishan, Singapore
	Lennart Thy 90+1'; Bailey Wright (yellow card) 90+5'	Report	Muhsen Al-Ghassani 45+2'; Luka Adžić 82'	Stadium: Bishan Stadium; Attendance: 2,049; Referee: Ahmad Alaeddin (Lebanon)

26 November 2025 5	Bangkok United (Thailand)	1–1	(Malaysia) Selangor	Pathum Thani, Thailand
	Rungrath Phumichantuk 51'; Kyoga Nakamura (yellow card) 43'; Nebojša Kosović (yellow card) 85'	Report	Chrigor 90+5'; Omid Musawi (yellow card) 70'	Stadium: True BG Stadium; Attendance: 1,091; Referee: Zhang Lei (China)

10 December 2025 6	Persib (Indonesia)	1–0	(Thailand) Bangkok United	Bandung, Indonesia
	Ramon Tanque 45+1'; Uilliam Barros (penalty missed) 10; Teja Paku Alam (yellow card) 90+4'	Report	Philipe Maia (yellow card) 60'	Stadium: Gelora Bandung Lautan Api Stadium; Attendance: 28,216; Referee: Ahmed Faisal Al-Ali (Jordan)

==== Knockout stage ====
12 February 2025 Rd of 16 Leg 1	Bangkok United (Thailand)	2–0	(Australia) Macarthur FC	Pathum Thani, Thailand
	Ilias Alhaft 37'; Arthur de Moura 72'; Philipe Maia (yellow card) 34'; Wanchai Jarunongkran (yellow card) 64'	Report	Callum Talbot (yellow card) 35'; Anthony Caceres (yellow card) 52'; Oliver Randazzo (yellow card) 89'	Stadium: True BG Stadium; Attendance: 1,092; Referee: Shen Yinhao (China)

19 February 2025 Rd of 16 Leg 2	Macarthur FC (Australia)	2–2 (2–4 agg.)	(Thailand) Bangkok United	Sydney, Australia
	Walter Scott 41'; Harry Sawyer 90+2' (yellow card) 55'; Dean Bosnjak (yellow card) 85'	Report	Muhsen Al-Ghassani 2', 33'; Arthur de Moura (yellow card) 49'	Stadium: Campbelltown Sports Stadium; Attendance: 1,666; Referee: Meder Tayçiev (Kyrgyzstan)

5 March 2026 Quarter Final Leg 1	Bangkok United (Thailand)	2–1	(Singapore) BG Tampines Rovers	Pathum Thani, Thailand
	Nebojša Kosović 11'; Picha Autra 18'; Philipe Maia (yellow card) 49' (yellow-red card) 81'; Patiwat Khammai (yellow card) 90+8'	Report	Trent Buhagiar 80'	Stadium: True BG Stadium; Attendance: 1,153; Referee: Ryo Tanimoto (Japan)

12 March 2026 Quarter Final Leg 2	BG Tampines Rovers (Singapore)	2–2 (3–4 agg.)	(Thailand) Bangkok United	Jalan Besar, Singapore
	Trent Buhagiar 39'; Koya Kazama 72'; Irfan Najeeb (yellow card) 31'	Report	Teerasil Dangda 16'; Ilias Alhaft 42'; Everton (yellow card) 20'; Wanchai Jarunongkran (yellow card) 82'; Suphan Thongsong (yellow card) 89'	Stadium: Jalan Besar Stadium; Attendance: 1,350; Referee: Wang Di (China)

8 April 2026 Semi Final Leg 1	Gamba Osaka (Japan)	0–1	(Thailand) Bangkok United	Osaka, Japan
	Shinnosuke Nakatani (red card) 75'	Report	Muhsen Al-Ghassani 15' (pen.); Jakkaphan Praisuwan (yellow card) 80'; Patiwat Khammai (yellow card) 90'	Stadium: Suita City Football Stadium; Attendance: 12,150; Referee: Nazmi Nasaruddin (Malaysia)

15 April 2026 Semi Final Leg 2	Bangkok United (Thailand)	0–3 (1–3 agg.)	(Japan) Gamba Osaka	Bangkok, Thailand
	Teerasil Dangda (yellow card) 39'; Richairo Zivkovic (yellow card) 85'; Arthur de Moura (yellow card) 87'	Report	Ryoya Yamashita 20'; Issam Jebali 40' (penalty missed) 40; Ryotaro Meshino 83'; Shuto Abe (yellow card) 21'; Ryo Hatsuse (yellow card) 57'	Stadium: Rajamangala Stadium (Note: Location changed due to True BG Stadium booked for other event); Attendance: 13,310; Referee: Kim Jong-Hyeok (South Korea)

=== ASEAN Club Championship ===
==== Group stage ====
Pos	Team	Pld	W	D	L	GF	GA	GD	Pts	Qualification	NDI	JDT	PKR	BKU	LCS	SUN
1	(Vietnam) Nam Định	5	4	1	0	13	3	+10	13	Advance to knockout stage	—	1–1	2–1	—	3–0	—
2	(Malaysia) Johor Darul Ta'zim	5	3	2	0	13	4	+9	11	Advance to knockout stage	—	—	—	4–0	3–1	3–0
3	(Cambodia) Preah Khan Reach Svay Rieng	5	2	2	1	9	5	+4	8		—	2–2	—	1–1	—	—
4	(Thailand) Bangkok United	5	1	2	2	6	12	−6	5		1–4	—	—	—	2–2	2–1
5	(Singapore) Lion City Sailors	5	1	1	3	6	12	−6	4		—	—	0–2	—	—	3–2
6	(Myanmar) Shan United	5	0	0	5	3	14	−11	0		0–3	—	0–3	—	—	—

Source: ASEAN United FC
Rules for classification: Tiebreakers

17 December 2025 1 (Rescheduled)	Bangkok United (Thailand)	1–4	(Vietnam) Nam Định	Pathum Thani, Thailand
	Wisarut Imura 85'; Guntapon Keereeleang (yellow card) 75'; Natcha Promsomboon (yellow card) 90+3'	Report	Lucas 44'; Nguyễn Xuân Son 49', 90+6' (yellow card) 90+6'; Trần Ngọc Sơn 59'; Rômulo (yellow card) 11'	Stadium: True BG Stadium; Referee: Yahya Ahmed Al Balushi (Oman)

25 September 2025 2	Johor Darul Ta'zim (Malaysia)	4–0	(Thailand) Bangkok United	Johor, Malaysia
	Bergson 46', 73', 90+2'; João Figueiredo 52'; Afiq Fazail (yellow card) 68'	Report	Philipe Maia (yellow card) 45+3'; Everton (yellow card) 45+3'	Stadium: Sultan Ibrahim Stadium; Referee: Kim Hee-gon (South Korea)

4 December 2025 3	Bangkok United (Thailand)	2–2	(Singapore) Lion City Sailors	Pathum Thani, Thailand
	Jakkaphan Praisuwan 24'; Seia Kunori 76'; Suphan Thongsong (yellow card) 35'; Wanchai Jarunongkran (yellow card) 75'	Report	Maxime Lestienne 11'; Anderson Lopes 20'	Stadium: True BG Stadium; Referee: Meder Tayçiev (Kyrgyzstan)

22 April 2026 4 (Rescheduled)	PKR Svay Rieng (Cambodia)	1–1	(Thailand) Bangkok United	Hanoi, Vietnam
	Saret Krya 45+1'; Soeuy Visal (yellow card) 25'	Report	Rungrath Phumichantuk 16'; Suphan Thongsong (yellow card) 40'; Wichan Inaram (yellow card) 90+4'	Stadium: Hàng Đẫy Stadium (Note: Location changed to neutral due to the Thailand-Cambodia conflict.); Referee: Koji Takasaki (Japan)

5 February 2026 5	Bangkok United (Thailand)	2–1	(Myanmar) Shan United	Pathum Thani, Thailand
	Rungrath Phumichantuk 24'; Nanda Kyaw 69' (o.g.)		Myat Kaung Khant 7'; Feroz Baharudin (yellow card) 86'	Stadium: True BG Stadium; Referee: Faisal Al-Balawi (Saudi Arabia)

== Statistics ==
=== Appearances and goals ===
@ 10 May 26

No.	Pos.	Player	Thai League		FA Cup		League Cup		AFC Champions League Elite		AFC Champions League Two		ASEAN Club Championship		Total	
No.	Pos.	Player	Apps.	Goals	Apps.	Goals	Apps.	Goals	Apps.	Goals	Apps.	Goals	Apps.	Goals	Apps.	Goals
1	GK	(Thailand) Patiwat Khammai	28	0	3	0	0	0	1	0	12	0	2	0	46	0
3	DF	(Brazil) Everton Gonçalves	27+1	1	3+1	2	1+1	0	0	0	11+1	0	1	0	47	3
4	DF	(Thailand) (Germany) Manuel Bihr	3+3	0	2	0	1	0	1	0	2+3	0	1	0	16	0
5	DF	(Brazil) Philipe Maia	23+2	3	2+1	0	1	0	1	0	9	1	2	0	41	4
6	DF	(Thailand) Nitipong Selanon	21+4	0	1+2	0	2	0	1	0	3+3	0	3	0	40	0
7	FW	(Brazil) Rivaldinho	5+8	3	1+1	1	1	0	0	0	1+4	0	0	0	21	4
8	MF	(Thailand) Wisarut Imura	3+4	0	0+1	0	1	0	0+1	0	2+1	0	3	1	16	1
10	FW	(Thailand) Teerasil Dangda	15+8	5	3+1	2	1+1	3	0+1	0	4+6	1	0+1	0	41	11
11	MF	(Thailand) Rungrath Poomchantuek	9+9	0	3+1	0	2	0	0	0	1+2	1	5	2	32	3
16	MF	(Oman) Muhsen Al-Ghassani	17+7	6	1+1	1	0	0	0+1	0	10+1	6	1	0	39	13
17	FW	(Japan) Seia Kunori	14+1	5	1+1	0	1+1	1	1	0	5+2	0	3+1	1	31	7
18	MF	(Thailand) Thitiphan Puangchan	19+2	2	4	1	1+1	0	0	0	9+2	0	0+3	0	41	3
19	FW	(Thailand) Chayawat Srinawong	0+2	0	0	0	0	0	0	0	0	0	0	0	2	0
20	FW	(Thailand) Guntapon Keereeleang	10+7	1	1+1	1	0	0	0	0	2+1	0	3+2	0	27	1
21	DF	(Indonesia) Pratama Arhan	5+4	0	0+1	0	1	0	0	0	1+1	0	2	0	15	0
23	DF	(South Korea) Lee Ki-je	0	0	0	0	0	0	0	0	0+1	0	0	0	1	0
24	DF	(Thailand) Wanchai Jarunongkran	18+4	0	4	1	1+1	0	1	0	10+1	0	2+2	0	44	1
26	DF	(Thailand) Suphan Thongsong	6+8	0	1+1	0	1+1	0	1	0	3+1	0	4+1	0	28	0
27	MF	(Thailand) Weerathep Pomphan	22+3	0	4	0	1+1	0	0	0	7+3	0	0+3	0	44	0
28	MF	(Thailand) Natcha Promsomboon	0+1	0	0+2	0	0+1	0	0	0	0	0	0+1	0	5	0
29	GK	(Thailand) Phuwadol Pholsongkram	2+2	0	1	0	2	0	0	0	0	0	2	0	9	0
30	FW	(Netherlands) (Curaçao) Richairo Zivkovic	7	4	0	0	0	0	1	0	2+2	0	0	0	12	4
32	MF	(Thailand) Narakhorn Kangkratok	0+1	0	0+1	1	1	0	0	0	0	0	2	0	5	1
33	MF	(Montenegro) Nebojša Kosović	9+3	3	0	0	0	0	0	0	7+3	1	3+1	0	26	4
36	DF	(Thailand) Jakkapan Praisuwan	17+8	0	2+1	0	1	0	0+1	0	9+3	0	3	1	45	1
37	MF	(Thailand) Picha Autra	4+3	0	1	0	0	0	0	0	3	1	0	0	11	1
38	GK	(Thailand) Chinnapong Raksri	0	0	0	0	0	0	0	0	0	0	0+1	0	1	0
39	MF	(Thailand) Pokklaw Anan	19+4	2	3	1	1+1	0	1	0	4+6	0	3	0	40	3
43	DF	(Thailand) Surachai Booncharee	1+1	0	0+1	0	0+1	0	0	0	0	0	0+2	0	6	0
51	DF	(Thailand) Phurich Subhensawang	0	0	0	0	0	0	0	0	0	0	0	0	0	0
52	DF	(Thailand) (Nigeria) Wichan Inaram	1+2	0	0	0	0	0	0	0	0	0	2	0	5	0
70	FW	(Brazil) Arthur Moura	4+9	2	1	0	1	0	0	0	1+5	1	2	0	23	3
96	DF	(Thailand) Boontawee Theppawong	0	0	1	0	0	0	0	0	0	0	1+2	0	4	0
97	MF	(Netherlands) (Morocco) (Indonesia) Ilias Alhaft	14+7	3	1+2	0	0+1	1	1	0	8+3	3	0+2	0	39	7
99	MF	(Thailand) Pichaya Kongsri	1+2	0	0	0	0+1	0	0	0	0	0	1+1	0	6	0
Players who have played this season but had left the club on loan to other club
7	MF	(Thailand) Anon Amornlerdsak	0	0	0	0	0	0	0	0	0	0	0	0	0	0
59	FW	(Thailand) Chukid Wanpraphao	0	0	0	0	0	0	0	0	0	0	0	0	0	0
90	FW	(Thailand) (Germany) Philip Bijawat Frey	0	0	0	0	0	0	0	0	0	0	0	0	0	0
Players who have played this season but had left the club permanently
7	FW	(Serbia) Luka Adžić	2+7	0	0	0	0	0	0+1	0	2+3	1	0+2	0	17	1
14	MF	(Singapore) (Japan) Kyoga Nakamura	3+6	1	0	0	0	0	1	0	4	0	3	0	17	1
