= David Malembana =

Mozambican footballer

Personal information
- Full name: David Zeferino Malembana
- Date of birth: 11 October 1995 (age 31)
- Place of birth: Freital, Germany
- Height: 1.95 m (6 ft 5 in)
- Position: Centre-back

Team information
- Current team: Slavia Sofia
- Number: 5

Senior career*
Years	Team	Apps	(Gls)
2013–2015	Dynamo Dresden II	16	(0)
2015–2016	Goslarer SC 08	27	(2)
2016–2019	Berliner FC Dynamo	57	(6)
2019–2021	Lokomotiv Plovdiv	41	(0)
2022–2023	Lokomotiv Sofia	23	(2)
2023–2024	FC Noah	16	(0)
2024–2025	Al Kharaitiyat	14	(0)
2025	Montana	6	(0)
2026–	Slavia Sofia	24	(3)

International career^{‡}
2021–	Mozambique	8	(0)
- * Club domestic league appearances and goals as of 1 November 2026 ‡ National team caps and goals as of 17:42, 11 October 2024 (UTC)

David Zeferino Malembana (born 11 October 1995) is a professional footballer who plays as a centre-back for Bulgarian First League club Slavia Sofia. Born in Germany, he plays for the Mozambique national team.

Formerly of Dynamo Dresden II and Goslarer SC 08, he spent three seasons with Berliner FC Dynamo, before joining Lokomotiv Plovdiv in 2019.

== Club career ==
Malembana began his career at Dynamo Dresden II in 2013 and moved to Goslarer SC 08 two years later. In 2016 he joined Berliner FC Dynamo, where he made 56 appearances in the Regionalliga Nordost, winning two Berlin Cups.

On 12 July 2019, Malembana signed a three-year contract with Bulgarian First League club Lokomotiv Plovdiv, after a successful trial period with the club. He made his debut a week later, coming on as a substitute for Parvizdzhon Umarbayev in second-half stoppage time of the league match against Slavia Sofia, which finished as a 3–2 home win. In February 2022, Malembana joined the other main "railwaymen" club in Bulgaria – Lokomotiv Sofia.

== International career ==
Malembana was born in Germany to a Mozambican Malagasy father and a German mother. He has stated his dream is to play for the Mozambique national team. He was already called up to represent the African country while he was a Berliner FC Dynamo player, but the head coach of the German side prevented him from going. He debuted with Mozambique in a 1–0 2022 FIFA World Cup qualification loss to Cameroon on 11 October 2021. On 22 December 2023, Malembana was included in the country's squad for the 2023 Africa Cup of Nations.

== Honours ==
Berliner FC Dynamo

- Berlin Cup: 2017, 2018

Lokomotiv Plovdiv

- Bulgarian Cup: 2019–20
- Bulgarian Supercup: 2020
