= Martin Gamboš =

Slovak footballer

Personal information
- Date of birth: 23 January 1998 (age 28)
- Place of birth: Žilina, Slovakia
- Height: 1.80 m (5 ft 11 in)
- Position: Midfielder

Team information
- Current team: Rustavi
- Number: 23

Youth career
- Žilina
- 2010–2014: Regensburg
- 2014–2017: Munich 1860

Senior career*
| Years | Team | Apps | (Gls) |
| 2017 | Munich 1860 II | 1 | (0) |
| 2018–2020 | Žilina | 12 | (1) |
| 2019–2020 | → Spartak Trnava (loan) | 21 | (1) |
| 2021 | Senica | 13 | (0) |
| 2021 | ViOn Zlaté Moravce | 15 | (0) |
| 2022 | Viktoria 1889 Berlin | 8 | (0) |
| 2022–2023 | Västerås SK | 24 | (1) |
| 2023–2025 | Noah | 43 | (1) |
| 2025–2026 | Komárno | 21 | (0) |
| 2026– | Rustavi | 2 | (0) |

International career^{‡}
| 2018 | Slovakia U20 | 2 | (1) |
| 2019 | Slovakia U21 | 5 | (1) |
- * Club domestic league appearances and goals as of 1 September 2026 ‡ National team caps and goals as of 18 July 2021

Martin Gamboš (born 23 January 1998) is a Slovak professional footballer who plays as a midfielder for Georgian club Rustavi.

== Club career ==
=== Žilina ===
Gamboš made his Fortuna Liga debut for Žilina against Ružomberok on 4 August 2018.

=== Senica ===
Despite being a local player at Žilina, Gamboš was swapped for Tenton Yenne as he transferred to Senica. Gamboš had signed a two-year contract with a one-year further option with the club. He cited lack of opportunities and interest at MŠK as the main reasons for his transfer.

=== ViOn Zlaté Moravce ===
In June 2021, Gamboš signed a two-year contract with Zlaté Moravce. He made his debut on 23 July in a 4–0 away loss to AS Trenčín, coming on as a first-half substitute for Martin Tóth.

=== Viktoria 1889 Berlin ===
On 1 February 2022, Gamboš joined Viktoria 1889 Berlin in the German 3. Liga.

=== Komárno ===
On 30 August 2025, Komárno announced the signing of Gamboš.
