= Alexandre Llovet =

French-Swiss footballer (born 1997)

Personal information
- Full name: Alexandre Llovet
- Date of birth: 26 November 1997 (age 28)
- Place of birth: Marseille, France
- Height: 1.72 m (5 ft 8 in)
- Position: Forward

Youth career
- 2012–2016: Montpellier

Senior career*
Years	Team	Apps	(Gls)
2016–2017	Montpellier II	24	(3)
2016–2017	Montpellier	2	(0)
2017–2018	Lusitanos	10	(5)
2018–2019	Racing Besançon	9	(2)
2019	AS Saint Rémoise	2	(0)
2019–2021	Marignane Gignac	30	(8)
2021–2022	Six-Fours Le Brusc		
2022–2023	Sète 34	8	(0)
2023	Noah	30	(8)
2024–2025	Inter Club d'Escaldes	18	(9)
2025–2026	Urartu	17	(1)
- * Club domestic league appearances and goals as of 4 June 2026

Alexandre Llovet (born 26 November 1997) is a French professional footballer who plays as a forward, most recently for Urartu.

== Professional career ==
Llovet made his professional debut for Montpellier in a 1–1 Ligue 1 tie with Toulouse FC on 30 November 2016.

17 February 2023, Armenian Premier League club Noah announced the signing of Llovet.

On 9 August 2025, Llovet returned to the Armenian Premier League, signing for Urartu. On 4 June 2026, Urartu announced that Llovet had left the club after his contract had expired.
