= Ilias Alhaft =

Dutch footballer (born 1997)

Personal information
- Full name: Ilias Alhaft
- Date of birth: 23 February 1997 (age 29)
- Place of birth: Rotterdam, Netherlands
- Height: 1.72 m (5 ft 8 in)
- Position: Winger

Team information
- Current team: Vanspor
- Number: 7

Youth career
- 2005–2008: RVVH
- 2008–2016: Sparta Rotterdam

Senior career*
Years	Team	Apps	(Gls)
2015–2019	Sparta Rotterdam	23	(0)
2016–2019	Jong Sparta	53	(15)
2019–2023	Almere City	93	(18)
2020	Jong Almere City	2	(0)
2023–2024	Noah	32	(6)
2024–2025	Cambuur	25	(3)
2025–2026	Bangkok United	21	(3)
2026–	Vanspor	10	(1)

International career
2014	Netherlands U18	5	(0)
2016–2018	Netherlands U20	9	(0)
- * Club domestic league appearances and goals as of 7 November 2026

Ilias Alhaft (born 23 February 1997) is a Dutch professional footballer who plays as a winger for Turkish TFF 1. Lig club Vanspor.

== Career ==
=== Sparta Rotterdam ===
Alhaft was born in on 23 February 1997 in Rotterdam, where he started playing football for RVVH in 2005. Three years later, he joined Sparta Rotterdam's youth academy.

Alhaft made his professional debut for Sparta on 29 April 2016, in a 3–2 home victory over Dordrecht, entering as a substitute for Loris Brogno in the 85th minute. During the 2016–17 season, he also played in the Tweede Divisie with Jong Sparta, the club's reserve team.

=== Almere City ===
In January 2019, Alhaft's contract with Sparta Rotterdam was terminated, and he subsequently joined Almere City, signing a three-and-a-half-year deal. He debuted for Almere City on 26 January 2019 in a home match against Twente. In April 2019, he suffered a torn cruciate ligament, which kept him out of action until February 2020. In 2023, Alhaft helped Almere achieve promotion to the Eredivisie through the play-offs, notably providing two key assists in the return match against Eindhoven in the first round.

=== Noah ===
In the summer of 2023, Alhaft signed with Armenian Premier League club Noah. He made his competitive debut for the club on 4 August, replacing compatriot Justin Mathieu in the 84th minute of a 1–0 away loss to BKMA Yerevan. On 18 August, he scored his first goal for the club, helping Noah to a 4–0 win over Shirak. During his sole season with the club, he scored seven goals across 34 appearances in all competitions.

=== Cambuur ===
On 3 September 2024, Alhaft returned to the Netherlands, where he signed a one-season contract with Eerste Divisie club Cambuur. He made his debut for the club ten days later, replacing Maikel Kieftenbeld in the 75th minute of a 1–0 home loss to Jong Ajax.

=== Bangkok United ===
On 28 June 2025, Alhaft moved to Thailand to join Thai League 1 club Bangkok United.

== Personal life ==
Born in the Netherlands, Alhaft is of Moroccan and Indonesian descent.

== Career statistics ==
As of match played 21 December 2025

Appearances and goals by club, season and competition
Club	Season	League			National cup (Note: Includes KNVB Cup, Armenian Cup)		Other		Total	
Club	Season	Division	Apps	Goals	Apps	Goals	Apps	Goals	Apps	Goals
Sparta Rotterdam	2015–16	Eerste Divisie	1	0	—		—		1	0
Sparta Rotterdam	2016–17	Eredivisie	4	0	0	0	—		4	0
Sparta Rotterdam	2017–18	Eredivisie	8	0	0	0	2 (Note: Appearance(s) in Eredivisie promotion/relegation playoffs)	0	10	0
Sparta Rotterdam	2018–19	Eerste Divisie	10	0	0	0	—		10	0
Sparta Rotterdam	Total		23	0	0	0	2	0	25	0
Jong Sparta	2016–17	Tweede Divisie	27	9	—		—		27	9
Jong Sparta	2017–18	Tweede Divisie	14	3	—		—		30	2
Jong Sparta	2018–19	Tweede Divisie	12	3	—		—		12	3
Jong Sparta	Total		53	15	—		—		53	15
Almere City	2018–19	Eerste Divisie	14	5	0	0	—		14	5
Almere City	2019–20	Eerste Divisie	3	0	0	0	—		3	0
Almere City	2020–21	Eerste Divisie	21	3	0	0	1	0	22	3
Almere City	2021–22	Eerste Divisie	28	8	1	0	—		29	8
Almere City	2022–23	Eerste Divisie	27	2	2	0	4	0	33	2
Almere City	Total		93	18	3	0	5	0	101	18
Jong Almere City	2019–20	Derde Divisie	2	0	—		—		2	0
Noah	2023–24	Armenian Premier League	32	6	2	1	—		34	7
Cambuur	2024–25	Eerste Divisie	25	3	0	0	—		25	3
Bangkok United	2025–26	Thai League 1	12	1	1	0	1	2	14	3
Career total			240	43	6	1	8	2	254	46

== Honours ==
Sparta Rotterdam

- Eerste Divisie: 2015–16
