= Nico Varela =

Uruguayan footballer (born 1991)

Personal information
- Full name: César Nicolás Varela Batista
- Date of birth: 19 January 1991 (age 35)
- Place of birth: Montevideo, Uruguay
- Height: 1.75 m (5 ft 9 in)
- Positions: Right winger; attacking midfielder

Team information
- Current team: Plus Ultra

Youth career
- 1995–1998: Ombu Juniors
- 1998–2002: Cosmos Corinto
- 2003–2004: Progreso
- 2004–2006: Ranero
- 2006–2010: Murcia

Senior career*
Years	Team	Apps	(Gls)
2010–2012	Murcia B	50	(8)
2011–2012	Murcia	6	(0)
2012–2013	Cádiz	6	(0)
2013	→ UCAM Murcia (loan)	17	(1)
2013–2014	Almería B	29	(4)
2014–2015	Zakynthos	22	(5)
2015	Botev Plovdiv	15	(3)
2016–2017	AEL	32	(5)
2017–2019	Wisła Płock	56	(9)
2019–2020	Enosis Neon Paralimni	20	(5)
2020–2021	Nea Salamina	26	(2)
2021–2022	PAEEK	21	(5)
2022–2023	AEZ Zakakiou	20	(5)
2023–2024	Noah	17	(1)
2024–	Plus Ultra	1	(1)
- * Club domestic league appearances and goals as of 5 October 2024

César Nicolás 'Nico' Varela Bautista (born 19 January 1991) is a Uruguayan professional footballer who plays for Tercera Federación club CD Plus Ultra as a right winger.

== Club career ==
=== Spain ===
Born in Montevideo, Varela moved to Spain in 2003, and was spotted by Real Murcia scouts while playing for local Ranero CF, aged 15. He made his senior debuts in 2009–10 season with the reserves, being relegated to Tercera División.

On 28 August 2011 Varela debuts as a professional, playing the last 23 minutes in a 1–3 home loss against Celta de Vigo. On 3 September, in his only second appearance with the first team, he was sent off after the end of the 90 minutes, in a 0–1 away loss against Elche CF.

On 17 March 2012, in a 1–3 away loss against Xerez CD, Varela was again sent off, being suspended for four matches. He finished the season with 6 appearances (111 minutes of action).

In July 2012 Varela signed with Cádiz CF, in Segunda División B. However, after only appearing six times with the Andalusians, he was loaned to UCAM Murcia CF in January 2013.

In July, Varela rescinded with Cádiz.

On 1 August 2013 Varela signed with UD Almería B, also in the third level. He was released in May of the following year, after contributing with four goals and 29 matches, his best input in the category.

=== Zakynthos ===
On 21 August 2014, Varela joined Football League Greece side Zakynthos F.C. He scored five goals in 22 matches, and left the club at the end of the season.

=== Botev Plovdiv ===
Varela joined PFC Botev Plovdiv on 1 July 2015. On 18 July he made an official debut during the 1–1 draw with Levski Sofia.

On 29 August 2015, Varela scored his first goal in A Grupa during the second half of the 2–1 home win over Cherno More Varna. He also scored the winner against PFC Montana and Cherno More.

Varela was released from Botev Plovdiv on 13 January 2016, after contributing with 16 games and three goals.

=== AEL ===
On 28 January 2016, Varela signed a 2 1/2-year contract with Greek club AEL. At the end of season, he celebrated the championship as the club was promoted to the Super League.
