= Martim Maia =

Portuguese footballer

Personal information
- Full name: Martim Malheiro Fabião Maia
- Date of birth: 24 May 1998 (age 28)
- Place of birth: Maia, Portugal
- Height: 1.75 m (5 ft 9 in)
- Position: Defensive midfielder

Team information
- Current team: Ethnikos Achna
- Number: 8

Youth career
- 2007–2008: FC Porto
- 2008–2014: Leixões
- 2014–2017: Rio Ave

Senior career*
Years	Team	Apps	(Gls)
2017–2020	Rio Ave	0	(0)
2017–2019	Rio Ave B	23	(0)
2019–2020	→ Casa Pia (loan)	13	(0)
2020–2021	Zagłębie Sosnowiec	22	(1)
2021–2022	Amora	21	(3)
2022–2024	Santa Clara	0	(0)
2022–2023	→ Trofense (loan)	14	(0)
2023–2024	→ Noah (loan)	33	(1)
2024–2025	Pyunik	7	(0)
2025–	Ethnikos Achna	16	(0)
- * Club domestic league appearances and goals as of 14 June 2026

Martim Malheiro Fabião Maia (born 24 May 1998) is a Portuguese professional footballer who plays as a defensive midfielder for Cypriot First Division club Ethnikos Achna.

== Football career ==
He made his Taça da Liga debut for Casa Pia on 28 July 2019 in a game against Vilafranquense.

On 7 August 2020, Maia signed a two-year contract with Polish club Zagłębie Sosnowiec.

On 6 July 2024, Armenian Premier League club Pyunik announced the signing of Maia.

== Career statistics ==
As of match played 25 May 2024

Appearances and goals by club, season and competition
Club	Season	League			National cup (Note: Includes Taça de Portugal, Polish Cup, Armenian Cup)		League cup (Note: Includes Taça da Liga)		Other		Total	
Club	Season	Division	Apps	Goals	Apps	Goals	Apps	Goals	Apps	Goals	Apps	Goals
Rio Ave	2017–18	Primeira Liga	0	0	0	0	0	0	0	0	0	0
Rio Ave	2018–19	Primeira Liga	0	0	0	0	0	0	0	0	0	0
Rio Ave	2019–20	Primeira Liga	0	0	0	0	0	0	0	0	0	0
Rio Ave	Total		0	0	0	0	0	0	0	0	0	0
Rio Ave B	2017–18	Liga Revelação	21	0	—		—		—		21	0
Rio Ave B	2018–19	Liga Revelação	2	0	—		—		—		2	0
Rio Ave B	Total		23	0	—		—		—		23	0
Casa Pia	2019–20	LigaPro	13	0	0	0	3	0	—		16	0
Zagłębie Sosnowiec	2020–21	I liga	22	0	1	0	—		—		23	0
Amora	2021–22	Primeira Liga	21	3	1	0	—		—		22	3
Trofense (loan)	2022–23	Liga Sabseg	14	0	1	0	1	0	—		16	0
Noah (loan)	2023–24	Armenian Premier League	33	1	2	0	—		—		35	1
Career total			126	4	5	0	4	0	0	0	135	4
