= 2022–23 FC Van season =

Van
2022–23 season
- Owner: Oleg Ghukasov
- Manager: Artur Asoyan; Humberto Viviani; Hayk Hovhannisyan
- Stadium: Charentsavan City Stadium
- Premier League: 5th
- Armenian Cup: Quarterfinal vs Shirak
- Top goalscorer: League: Edgar Movsesyan (9); All: Edgar Movsesyan (9)

The 2022–23 season was FC Van's 3rd season in Armenian Premier League.

== Season events ==
On 24 June, Van announced the season-long loan signing of Pavel Gorelov from Rostov.

On 20 July, Van announced the singings of Hamlet Asoyan from Lernayin Artsakh and Edgar Movsesyan from Pyunik.

On 24 July, Artur Stepanyan returned to Van from BKMA Yerevan.

On 26 July, Van announced the singings of Samur Agamagomedov, Daur Chanba and Alan Tatayev.

On 28 July, Artem Bilyi signed from Metalist Kharkiv and Gegham Harutyunyan joined from Noah.

On 1 August, Van announced the signing of Milan Lalic from Sloboda Novi Grad.

On 13 August, Van announced the signings of Ibrahim Yahaya, Christopher Boniface, Sani Buhari and Goodnews Igbokwe all from the Right2Win Sports Academy.

On 1 September, Van announced the signings of Bohdan Mytsyk from Ida-Virumaa and Mubarak Ahmed from the Right2Win Sports Academy

On 8 September, Gevorg Najaryan joined Van from Pyunik.

On 7 November, Van announced the signing of goalkeeper Yevhen Hrytsenko from Shakhtar Donetsk.

On 26 January, Van announced the signing of Artur Kartashyan after he'd spent the first half of the 2022–23 season at Olympiakos Nicosia, with Arman Mkrtchyan joining the following day from Ararat Yerevan and free-agent goalkeeper Diego Zamora joining of 28 January.

On 29 January, Van announced the signings of Manuel Morello from Central Norte and Renato Bengo from La Nucía.

On 31 January, Van announced the signing of Daniel Cifuentes from Racing de Montevideo.

On 9 February, Yevhen Hrytsenko and David Arshakyan both left the club.

On 11 February, Van announced the signing of Wilson Barrios from Estudiantes de Mérida.

On 15 February, Van announced the signings of Rumyan Hovsepyan from Alashkert and of free-agent Armen Manucharyan.

On 21 February, Gegham Kadimyan joined Van from Neman Grodno, whilst two days later free-agent Bismark Ubah signed.

On 22 February, Van announced the signing of Danil Ankudinov on loan from Sheriff Tiraspol for the remainder of the season.

On 29 March, Van announced the signing of David Manoyan, who'd most recently played for Ararat Yerevan.

== Squad ==
As of match played 4 June 2023

Number	Name	Nationality	Position	Date of birth (age)	Signed from	Signed in	Contract ends	Apps.	Goals
Goalkeepers
1	Samur Agamagomedov	(Russia)	GK	30 November 1998 (aged 24)	Legion Makhachkala	2022			
12	Artur Melkonyan	(Armenia)	GK	13 June 2004 (aged 18)	Unattached	2022		0	0
22	Diego Zamora	(Bolivia)	GK	12 September 1993 (aged 29)	Unattached	2023		12	0
Defenders
2	Vaspurak Minasyan	(Armenia)	DF	29 June 1994 (aged 28)	Pyunik	2022		52	1
3	Artur Kartashyan	(Armenia)	DF	8 January 1997 (aged 26)	Olympiakos Nicosia	2023		9	0
5	Armen Manucharyan	(Armenia)	DF	3 February 1995 (aged 28)	Unattached	2023		13	0
21	Daniel Cifuentes	(Colombia)	DF	21 April 1999 (aged 24)	Racing de Montevideo	2023		10	1
30	Manuel Morello	(Argentina)	DF	20 October 1994 (aged 28)	Central Norte	2022		16	1
33	Hamlet Asoyan	(Armenia)	DF	13 January 1995 (aged 28)	Lernayin Artsakh	2022		35	0
37	Ibrahim Yahaya	(Nigeria)	DF	28 March 2000 (aged 23)	Right2Win Sports Academy	2022		5	0
99	Arman Mkrtchyan	(Armenia)	DF	9 July 1999 (aged 23)	Unattached	2023		12	0
Midfielders
8	Rumyan Hovsepyan	(Armenia)	MF	13 November 1991 (aged 31)	Unattached	2023		12	3
10	David Manoyan	(Armenia)	MF	5 July 1990 (aged 32)	Unattached	2023		10	1
14	Christopher Boniface	(Nigeria)	MF	1 January 2002 (aged 21)	Right2Win Sports Academy	2022		22	2
17	Sani Buhari	(Nigeria)	MF	10 January 2004 (aged 19)	Right2Win Sports Academy	2022		25	3
18	Narek Hovhannisyan	(Armenia)	MF	11 June 2002 (aged 20)	Ararat-Armenia II	2022		41	1
19	Gevorg Najaryan	(Kazakhstan)	MF	6 January 1998 (aged 25)	Pyunik	2022		23	0
23	Pavel Gorelov	(Armenia)	MF	22 January 2003 (aged 20)	on loan from Rostov	2022	2023	36	3
27	Josue Gaba	(Ivory Coast)	MF	12 January 2002 (aged 21)	Unattached	2020			
77	Mohammed Fatau	(Ghana)	MF	24 December 1992 (aged 30)	Spartak Varna	2023		1	0
87	Gegham Kadimyan	(Armenia)	MF	19 October 1992 (aged 30)	Neman Grodno	2023		10	1
	Renato Bengo	(Equatorial Guinea)	MF	25 June 2003 (aged 19)	La Nucía	2023		0	0
Forwards
7	Edgar Movsesyan	(Armenia)	FW	12 January 2002 (aged 21)	Pyunik	2022		38	9
9	Danil Ankudinov	(Kazakhstan)	FW	31 July 2003 (aged 19)	on loan from Sheriff Tiraspol	2023	2023	17	4
70	Wilson Barrios	(Venezuela)	FW	23 August 2000 (aged 22)	Estudiantes de Mérida	2023		8	0
90	Bismark Ubah	(Nigeria)	FW	5 January 1994 (aged 29)	Unattached	2023		2	0
Players away on loan
10	Ipehe Williams	(Ivory Coast)	FW	7 August 2001 (aged 21)	Unattached	2022		34	1
Players who left during the season
4	Bohdan Mytsyk	(Ukraine)	DF	8 March 1998 (aged 25)	Ida-Virumaa Alliance	2022		13	3
6	Daur Chanba	(Russia)	DF	7 July 2000 (aged 22)	Unattached	2022		3	0
8	Shota Gvazava	(Georgia (country))	MF	26 October 1992 (aged 30)	Slutsk	2022		38	0
9	Goodnews Igbokwe	(Nigeria)	FW	26 February 2003 (aged 20)	Right2Win Sports Academy	2022		1	0
11	Eduard Avagyan	(Armenia)	MF	21 March 1996 (aged 27)	Unattached	2022		8	0
13	Emmanuel Mireku	(Ghana)	MF	25 December 1997 (aged 25)	Unattached	2021		34	1
20	Silvio Gutierrez	(Ecuador)	DF	28 February 1993 (aged 30)	Club Deportivo Estudiantes	2022		25	0
21	David Papikyan	(Armenia)	GK	15 February 1999 (aged 24)	Torpedo Yerevan	2021		5	0
22	Gegham Harutyunyan	(Armenia)	FW	23 August 1990 (aged 32)	Noah	2022		18	0
28	Alexander Hovhannisyan	(Armenia)	DF	20 July 1996 (aged 26)	Gandzasar Kapan	2021		28	0
30	Artur Stepanyan	(Armenia)	DF	17 November 1999 (aged 23)	BKMA Yerevan	2022			
33	Alan Tatayev	(Russia)	MF	3 August 1995 (aged 27)	Unattached	2022		14	0
55	Yevhen Hrytsenko	(Ukraine)	GK	5 February 1995 (aged 28)	Shakhtar Donetsk	2022		2	0
77	Milan Lalic	(Serbia)	DF	25 July 1995 (aged 27)	Sloboda Novi Grad	2022		9	0
91	Mubarak Ahmed	(Nigeria)	FW	25 March 2003 (aged 20)	Right2Win Sports Academy	2022		16	2
94	David Arshakyan	(Armenia)	MF	16 August 1994 (aged 28)	FA Šiauliai	2022		1	0
99	Artem Bilyi	(Ukraine)	MF	3 October 1999 (aged 23)	Metalist Kharkiv	2022		18	2

== Transfers ==
=== In ===
Date	Position	Nationality	Name	From	Fee	Ref.
1 July 2022	DF	(Armenia)	Vaspurak Minasyan	Pyunik	Undisclosed	
20 July 2022	DF	(Armenia)	Hamlet Asoyan	Lernayin Artsakh	Undisclosed	
20 July 2022	FW	(Armenia)	Edgar Movsesyan	Pyunik	Undisclosed	
24 July 2022	DF	(Armenia)	Artur Stepanyan	BKMA Yerevan	Undisclosed	
26 July 2022	GK	(Russia)	Samur Agamagomedov	Legion Dynamo Makhachkala	Undisclosed	
26 July 2022	DF	(Russia)	Daur Chanba	Unattached	Free	
26 July 2022	MF	(Russia)	Alan Tatayev	Unattached	Free	
28 July 2022	MF	(Ukraine)	Artem Bilyi	Metalist Kharkiv	Undisclosed	
28 July 2022	FW	(Armenia)	Gegham Harutyunyan	Noah	Undisclosed	
1 August 2022	DF	(Serbia)	Milan Lalic	Sloboda Novi Grad	Undisclosed	
13 August 2022	DF	(Nigeria)	Ibrahim Yahaya	Right2Win Sports Academy	Undisclosed	
13 August 2022	MF	(Nigeria)	Christopher Boniface	Right2Win Sports Academy	Undisclosed	
13 August 2022	MF	(Nigeria)	Sani Buhari	Right2Win Sports Academy	Undisclosed	
13 August 2022	FW	(Nigeria)	Goodnews Igbokwe	Right2Win Sports Academy	Undisclosed	
20 August 2022	DF	(Russia)	Kirill Antropov	Ufa	Undisclosed	
1 September 2022	DF	(Ukraine)	Bohdan Mytsyk	Ida-Virumaa	Undisclosed	
1 September 2022	FW	(Nigeria)	Mubarak Ahmed	Right2Win Sports Academy	Undisclosed	
8 September 2022	MF	(Kazakhstan)	Gevorg Najaryan	Pyunik	Undisclosed	
7 November 2022	GK	(Ukraine)	Yevhen Hrytsenko	Shakhtar Donetsk	Undisclosed	
26 January 2023	DF	(Armenia)	Artur Kartashyan	Olympiakos Nicosia	Undisclosed	
27 January 2023	DF	(Armenia)	Arman Mkrtchyan	Unattached	Free	
28 January 2023	GK	(Bolivia)	Diego Zamora	Unattached	Free	
29 January 2023	DF	(Argentina)	Manuel Morello	Central Norte	Undisclosed	
29 January 2023	MF	(Equatorial Guinea)	Renato Bengo	La Nucía	Undisclosed	
31 January 2023	DF	(Colombia)	Daniel Cifuentes	Racing de Montevideo	Undisclosed	
11 February 2023	FW	(Venezuela)	Wilson Barrios	Estudiantes de Mérida	Undisclosed	
15 February 2023	DF	(Armenia)	Armen Manucharyan	Unattached	Free	
15 February 2023	MF	(Armenia)	Rumyan Hovsepyan	Unattached	Free	
21 February 2023	FW	(Armenia)	Gegham Kadimyan	Neman Grodno	Undisclosed	
23 February 2023	FW	(Nigeria)	Bismark Ubah	Unattached	Free	
29 March 2023	MF	(Armenia)	David Manoyan	Unattached	Free	

=== Loans in ===
Date from	Position	Nationality	Name	From	Date to	Ref.
24 June 2022	MF	(Armenia)	Pavel Gorelov	Rostov	End of season	
22 February 2023	FW	(Kazakhstan)	Danil Ankudinov	Sheriff Tiraspol	End of season	

=== Loans out ===
Date from	Position	Nationality	Name	To	Date to	Ref.
2 March 2023	FW	(Ivory Coast)	Ipehe Williams	Lernayin Artsakh	End of season	

=== Released ===
Date	Position	Nationality	Name	Joined	Date	Ref.
29 December 2022	DF	(Armenia)	Alexander Hovhannisyan			}
29 December 2022	DF	(Ecuador)	Silvio Gutiérrez	Deportivo Cuenca		
29 December 2022	DF	(Russia)	Kirill Antropov	Onor	1 July 2023	
29 December 2022	DF	(Russia)	Daur Chanba			
29 December 2022	DF	(Serbia)	Milan Lalic	Sloga Meridian		
29 December 2022	MF	(Ukraine)	Artem Bilyi	Liepāja	9 January 2023	
16 January 2023	MF	(Georgia (country))	Shota Gvazava	Mash'al Mubarek	11 March 2023	
16 January 2023	MF	(Russia)	Alan Tatayev			
27 January 2023	DF	(Ukraine)	Bohdan Mytsyk	Marijampolė City		
27 January 2023	FW	(Nigeria)	Mubarak Ahmed	Ceahlăul Piatra Neamț		
7 February 2023	GK	(Armenia)	David Papikyan			
7 February 2023	MF	(Ghana)	Emmanuel Mireku	Turkse Rangers		
7 February 2023	FW	(Armenia)	Gegham Harutyunyan			
9 February 2023	GK	(Ukraine)	Yevhen Hrytsenko	Ravshan Kulob		
9 February 2023	FW	(Armenia)	David Arshakyan	BKMA Yerevan		
19 February 2023	DF	(Armenia)	Artur Stepanyan			

== Competitions ==
=== Overall record ===
Competition	First match	Last match	Starting round	Final position	Record							
Competition	First match	Last match	Starting round	Final position	Pld	W	D	L	GF	GA	GD	Win %
Premier League	2 August 2022	4 June 2022	Matchday 1	5th	36	11	7	18	38	59	−21	30.56
Armenian Cup	24 November 2022	26 November 2022	First Round	Quarterfinal	2	1	0	1	3	3	+0	50.00
Total					38	12	7	19	41	62	−21	31.58

Last updated: 4 June 2023
Source: Competitions

=== Premier League ===
==== Results summary ====
Overall								Home						Away					
Pld	W	D	L	GF	GA	GD	Pts	W	D	L	GF	GA	GD	W	D	L	GF	GA	GD
36	11	7	18	38	59	−21	40	5	4	9	21	30	−9	6	3	9	17	29	−12

Last updated: 4 June 2023.
Source: See Results

==== Results by round ====
Round	1	2	3	4	5	6	7	8	9	10	11	12	13	14	15	16	17	18	19	20	21	22	23	24	25	26	27	28	29	30	31	32	33	34	35	36
Ground	A	H	A	A	A	H	A	A	H	H	A	H	H	A	H	H	A	A	H	H	A	H	A	H	A	A	H	H	A	H	A	H	A	H	H	A
Result	W	D	W	W	L	L	D	D	D	D	W	L	L	L	W	W	D	W	L	L	L	L	W	L	L	L	D	W	L	L	L	W	L	W	L	L
Position																																				

Updated to match(es) played on 4 June 2023. Source: See Results
A = Away; H = Home; W = Win; D = Draw; L = Loss; V = Void

==== Results ====
29 July 2022 1	Lernayin Artsakh	0–1	Van	Vayk
17:45 (UTC+4)	Sow (yellow card) 78'; Mkrtchyan (yellow card) 88'; Palacios (yellow card) 90+5'	Report	Movsesyan 90+2' (pen.); Agamagomedov (yellow card) 90+5'	Stadium: Arevik Stadium; Referee: Davit Mkrtchyan

7 August 2022 2	Van	2–2	BKMA Yerevan	Charentsavan
17:30 (UTC+4)	Asoyan (yellow card) 5'; Lalic (yellow card) 50'; Tatayev (yellow card) 56'; Movsesyan 57', 82' (pen.); Bilyi (yellow card) 90+5' (yellow-red card) 90+5'	Report	Aghbalyan 19' (yellow card) 84'; Grigoryan (yellow card) 22'; Shaghoyan 51' (pen.) (yellow card) 78'; Simonyan (yellow card) 81'; A.Petrosyan (yellow card) 85'	Stadium: Charentsavan City Stadium; Referee: Vardan Manukyan

13 August 2022 3	Urartu	0–1	Van	Yerevan
20:30 (UTC+4)	Paramonov (yellow card) 75' (red card) 75'; Nazarov (yellow card) 89'; Beglaryan (yellow card) 90+5'	Report	Williams 8'; Harutyunyan (yellow card) 72'; Gorelov (yellow card) 90+5'	Stadium: Urartu Stadium; Referee: Ashot Ghaltakhchyan

21 August 2022 4	Pyunik	0–1	Van	Yerevan
20:00 (UTC+4)	Mensalao (yellow card) 52'	Report	Asoyan (yellow card) 17'; Gvazava (yellow card) 41'; Tatayev (yellow card) 60'; Harutyunyan (yellow card) 63'; Gorelov 83'	Stadium: Republican Stadium; Referee: Henrik Nalbandian

27 August 2022 5	Ararat Yerevan	1–0	Van	Yerevan
19:00 (UTC+4)	Mkoyan (yellow card) 5'; Arakelyan 28'; R.Mkrtchyan (yellow card) 45+1'; Potapov (yellow card) 90+1'	Report	Buhari (yellow card) 72'; Boniface (yellow card) 84'; Asoyan (yellow card) 90+7'	Stadium: Republican Stadium; Referee: Ashot Ghaltakhchyan

2 September 2022 6	Van	0–4	Ararat-Armenia	Charentsavan
17:00 (UTC+4)		Report	Duarte 33', 73'; Yenne (yellow card) 53'; Eza 60', 62'	Stadium: Charentsavan City Stadium; Referee: Mesrop Ghazaryan

8 September 2022 7	Shirak	1–1	Van	Gyumri
16:00 (UTC+4)	Mikaelyan (yellow card) 59'	Report	Asoyan (yellow card) 71'	Stadium: Gyumri City Stadium; Referee: Sargis Khachatryan

16 September 2022 8	Alashkert	0–0	Van	Yerevan
16:00 (UTC+4)	A.Grigoryan (yellow card) 82'	Report	Boniface (yellow card) 83'; Gaba (yellow card) 84'	Stadium: Alashkert Stadium; Referee: Ashot Ghaltakhchyan

2 October 2022 9	Van	2–2	Noah	Charentsavan
15:00 (UTC+4)	Gutiérrez (yellow card) 16'; Stepanyan (yellow card) 71'; Bilyi 77'; Movsesyan 88'	Report	Vardanyan 42'; Muradyan (yellow card) 77'; Hayrapetyan (yellow card) 79'; Ebenezer (yellow card) 84'; Opoku 90+3' (yellow card) 90+6'	Stadium: Charentsavan City Stadium; Referee: Vardan Manukyan

11 October 2022 10	Van	1–1	Lernayin Artsakh	Charentsavan
15:00 (UTC+4)	Movsesyan 14'; Gutiérrez (yellow card) 58'; Mytsyk (yellow card) 67'; Buhari (yellow card) 84'; Gorelov (yellow card) 90+2'	Report	Jnohope (yellow card) 28'; Kostandyan 45+1'; Kharatyan (yellow card) 69'; Bilunga (yellow card) 78'	Stadium: Charentsavan City Stadium; Referee: Ashot Ghaltakhchyan

15 October 2022 11	BKMA Yerevan	0–3	Van	Yerevan
16:00 (UTC+4)	A.Petrosyan (yellow card) 15'; Mirzoyan (yellow card) 44'; D.Hakobyan (yellow card) 88'	Report	Movsesyan 16' (pen.); Mytsyk 31'; Gorelov 57'; Ahmed (yellow card) 78'	Stadium: FFA Stadium; Referee: Artem Gasparyan

19 October 2022 12	Van	0–1	Urartu	Charentsavan
15:00 (UTC+4)	Gorelov (yellow card) 14'; N.Hovhannisyan (yellow card) 74'	Report	Asoyan 69' (o.g.); N.Grigoryan (yellow card) 72'	Stadium: Charentsavan City Stadium; Referee: Ashot Ghaltakhchyan

29 October 2022 14	Van	0–2	Ararat Yerevan	Charentsavan
15:00 (UTC+4)		Report	Traoré 28' (yellow card) 55'; Dagrou 37'; A.Mkrtchyan (yellow card) 51'	Stadium: Charentsavan City Stadium; Referee: Yura Mahtesyan

3 November 2022 15	Ararat-Armenia	4–0	Van	Yerevan
16:00 (UTC+4)	Yenne 17'; Firmino 20', 86'; Lima 90+1'	Report	Mytsyk (yellow card) 35'	Stadium: FFA Stadium; Referee: Ashot Ghaltakhchyan

9 November 2022 16	Van	2–1	Shirak	Charentsavan
14:00 (UTC+4)	Ahmed (yellow card) 27'; Movsesyan 67'; Asoyan (yellow card) 86'; Hovhannisyan 90+2'	Report	Mikaelyan (yellow card) 20'; Prljević (yellow card) 37'; Kodia 45'; Darbinyan (yellow card) 57'	Stadium: Charentsavan City Stadium; Referee: Yura Mahtesyan

13 November 2022 17	Van	1–0	Alashkert	Charentsavan
14:00 (UTC+4)	N.Hovhannisyan (yellow card) 82'; Ahmed 85'; Gutiérrez (yellow card) 90+2'	Report	Ivanov (yellow card) 79'	Stadium: Charentsavan City Stadium; Referee: Davit Mkrtchyan

20 November 2022 18	Noah	2–2	Van	Armavir
14:00 (UTC+4)	Vardanyan 8' (pen.); Baghramyan (yellow card) 54' (yellow-red card) 59'; Salou (yellow card) 60'; Igbokwe 69'; Ayvazov (yellow card) 90+5'	Report	Agamagomedov (yellow card) 7'; Asoyan (yellow card) 29'; Yahaya (yellow card) 36' (yellow-red card) 72'; Buhari 55'; Movsesyan (yellow card) 90+2'; Mytsyk 90+5'	Stadium: Armavir City Stadium; Referee: Ashot Ghaltakhchyan

28 November 2022 19	Lernayin Artsakh	0–2	Van	Vayk
14:00 (UTC+4)	Palacios (yellow card) 45+2'; Poghosyan (yellow card) 64'	Report	Minasyan 12'; Gvazava (yellow card) 19'; Najaryan (yellow card) 45+2' (red card) 45+2'; Gorelov (yellow card) 73'; Gutiérrez (yellow card) 83'; Hrytsenko (yellow card) 87'; Movsesyan 90+7'	Stadium: Arevik Stadium; Referee: Ashot Ghaltakhchyan

3 December 2022 20	Van	0–1	BKMA Yerevan	Charentsavan
14:00 (UTC+4)	Mytsyk (yellow card) 25'; Buhari (yellow card) 59'	Report	Khamoyan (yellow card) 5'; Mirzoyan 48'; A.Petrosyan (yellow card) 59'; S.Grigoryan (yellow card) 67'	Stadium: Charentsavan City Stadium; Referee: Ashot Ghaltakhchyan

24 February 2023 13	Van	0–3	Pyunik	Charentsavan
15:00 (UTC+4)	Hovsepyan (yellow card) 29'; Williams (yellow card) 74'	Report	Otubanjo 14'; Caraballo 23', 79'; Gareginyan (yellow card) 90+7'	Stadium: Charentsavan City Stadium; Referee: Henrik Nalbandian
Note: Match originally scheduled for 24 October, but postponed on 19 October.

1 March 2022 21	Urartu	2–0	Van	Armavir
15:00 (UTC+4)	Grigoryan 43'; Mayrovich 60'; Aghasaryan (yellow card) 71'; Ghazaryan (yellow card) 89'; Sabua (red card) 90+1'	Report	Barrios (yellow card) 38'; Asoyan (yellow card) 52'	Stadium: Armavir City Stadium; Referee: Zaven Hovhannisyan
Note: Match played at the Armavir City Stadium in Armavir, instead of Urartu's regular Urartu Stadium in Yerevan.

5 March 2023 22	Van	1–3	Pyunik	Charentsavan
14:00 (UTC+4)	Hovhannisyan (yellow card) 29'; Gaba 49'; Hovsepyan (yellow card) 54'; Kartashyan (yellow card) 58' (red card) 58'; Gorelov (yellow card) 75'	Report	Malakyan (yellow card) 75'; Juričić 81', 90+3'; Otubanjo 83'	Stadium: Charentsavan City Stadium; Referee: Ashot Ghaltakhchyan

10 March 2023 23	Ararat Yerevan	1–3	Van	Charentsavan
18:00 (UTC+4)	G.Malakyan (yellow card) 61'; Arzoyan (yellow card) 75' (yellow-red card) 75'; Ra.Hakobyan 90+5'	Report	Moustapha 8' (o.g.); Cifuentes (yellow card) 37'; Hovsepyan 62' (pen.); Gaba (yellow card) 88'; Kadimyan 90+2'	Stadium: Charentsavan City Stadium; Referee: Zaven Hovhannisyan

17 March 2023 24	Van	1–2	Ararat-Armenia	Charentsavan
15:00 (UTC+4)	Najaryan (yellow card) 45'; Gorelov 53'; Manucharyan (yellow card) 76'; Cifuentes (yellow card) 90+8' (red card) 90+8'	Report	Serobyan (yellow card) 35'; Ambartsumyan (yellow card) 56'; Hakobyan (yellow card) 75'; Alemão 89' (pen.), 90+9' (pen.)	Stadium: Charentsavan City Stadium; Referee: Vardan Manukyan

1 April 2023 25	Shirak	1–0	Van	Gyumri
19:00 (UTC+4)	Bakayoko 68'; Torosyan (yellow card) 82'	Report	Gorelov (yellow card) 7'; Najaryan (red card) 54'; Hovsepyan (yellow card) 59'	Stadium: Gyumri City Stadium; Referee: Yura Mahtesyan

9 April 2023 26	Alashkert	3–1	Van	Yerevan
16:00 (UTC+4)	Yedigaryan 9' (pen.) (yellow card) 79'; Ustinov 20' (yellow card) 57'; Rudoselsky (red card) 44'; Kartashyan 68' (o.g.)	Report	Hovsepyan (yellow card) 8'; Asoyan (yellow card) 26'; Movsesyan (yellow card) 45+1'; Morello 90+9'	Stadium: Alashkert Stadium; Referee: Ashot Ghaltakhchyan

17 April 2023 27	Van	1–1	Noah	Charentsavan
16:00 (UTC+4)	Najaryan (yellow card) 55'; Manoyan 62'; Manucharyan (yellow card) 69'; Hovhannisyan (yellow card) 90+5'	Report	Muradyan (yellow card) 22'; Vardanyan (yellow card) 61'; Muradyan (yellow card) 69'; Llovet 80'	Stadium: Charentsavan City Stadium; Referee: Vardan Manukyan

21 April 2023 28	Van	4–0	Lernayin Artsakh	Charentsavan
14:00 (UTC+4)	Ankudinov 19', 54', 66'; Buhari 57'	Report	Sow (yellow card) 72'	Stadium: Charentsavan City Stadium; Referee: Artem Gasparyan

26 April 2023 29	BKMA Yerevan	5–1	Van	Yerevan
17:00 (UTC+4)	Mkrtchyan 16'; Abrahamyan (yellow card) 32'; Lulukyan 76' (pen.); M.Hakobyan (yellow card) 90'; Eloyan (yellow card) 90+5'; Tarakhchyan 90+10'	Report	Buhari (yellow card) 20'; Hovsepyan 32' (pen.) (yellow card) 57' (yellow-red card) 57'; Hovhannisyan (yellow card) 90+4'	Stadium: FFA Stadium; Referee: Davit Mkrtchyan

2 May 2023 30	Van	0–5	Urartu	Charentsavan
16:00 (UTC+4)	Manucharyan (yellow card) 12'; Buhari (yellow card) 45+1'; Cifuentes (yellow card) 81'	Report	Khurtsidze 36'; Khlyobas (yellow card) 61'; Margaryan 70'; Piloyan (yellow card) 73'; Morello 77' (o.g.); Polyakov 82'; Sabua 86'; Carioca (yellow card) 88'	Stadium: Charentsavan City Stadium; Referee: Yura Mahtesyan

7 May 2023 31	Pyunik	4–0	Van	Yerevan
19:00 (UTC+4)	Otubanjo 25'; Malakyan 34'; Miljković 53'; Harutyunyan 58'	Report	Asoyan (yellow card) 38'; Gaba (yellow card) 52'; Movsesyan (yellow card) 87'	Stadium: Republican Stadium; Referee: Sargis Khachatryan

15 May 2023 32	Van	3–1	Ararat Yerevan	Charentsavan
16:00 (UTC+4)	Movsesyan 7'; Gorelov (yellow card) 70'; Hovsepyan 90+2'; Boniface 90+7'	Report	G.Malakyan (yellow card) 45+1'; Glišić 76' (yellow card) 77' (red card) 77'; Mkoyan (yellow card) 80' (red card) 80'	Stadium: Charentsavan City Stadium; Referee: Ashot Ghaltakhchyan

22 May 2023 33	Ararat-Armenia	4–1	Van	Yerevan
16:45 (UTC+4)	Eza 26'; Serobyan 53'; Hakobyan 57' (yellow card) 84'; Jibril 66'	Report	Ankudinov 15'; Cifuentes (yellow card) 84'; Hovsepyan (yellow card) 87'	Stadium: FFA Stadium; Referee: Vardan Manukyan

26 May 2023 34	Van	3–0	Shirak	Charentsavan
17:00 (UTC+4)	Tarloyan 15' (o.g.); Cifuentes 18'; Boniface 69'; Manoyan (red card) 74'; Gaba (yellow card) 79'	Report	Traore (red card) 74'; Papikyan (yellow card) 90+3'	Stadium: Charentsavan City Stadium; Referee: Henrik Nalbandian

31 May 2023 35	Van	0–1	Alashkert	Charentsavan
17:00 (UTC+4)	Gorelov (yellow card) 36'	Report	Ivanov (yellow card) 32' (goal) 40'; Miranyan (yellow card) 80'; Mysak (yellow card) 90+6'	Stadium: Charentsavan City Stadium; Referee: Zaven Hovhannisyan

4 June 2023 36	Noah	1–0	Van	Abovyan
19:00 (UTC+4)	Vardanyan 29'; Igbokwe (yellow card) 31'; Balbarau (yellow card) 61'; Baghramyan (yellow card) 82'; Danielyan (yellow card) 90+4'; S.Muradyan (red card) 90+5'	Report	Asoyan (yellow card) 31'; Gorelov (yellow card) 62'; Najaryan (yellow card) 82'; Barrios (red card) 90+5'; Zamora (yellow card) 90+6'	Stadium: Abovyan City Stadium; Referee: Ashot Ghaltakhchyan

==== Table ====
Pos	Team	Pld	W	D	L	GF	GA	GD	Pts	Qualification or relegation
1	Urartu (C)	36	26	5	5	68	25	+43	83	Qualification for the Champions League first qualifying round
2	Pyunik	36	25	5	6	72	23	+49	80	Qualification for the Europa Conference League first qualifying round (Note: The 2022–23 Armenian Cup winners qualified for the Europa Conference League first qualifying round. Since the cup winners (Urartu) qualified based on league position, the Europa Conference League spot was passed to the fourth-placed team.)
3	Ararat-Armenia	36	23	7	6	70	27	+43	76	Qualification for the Europa Conference League first qualifying round
4	Alashkert	36	20	6	10	58	37	+21	66	Qualification for the Europa Conference League first qualifying round
5	Van	36	11	7	18	38	59	−21	40	
6	Ararat Yerevan	36	10	8	18	29	42	−13	38	
7	Shirak	36	10	6	20	25	55	−30	36	
8	Noah	36	8	8	20	34	66	−32	32 (Note: Games won: Noah 8, BKMA 7.)	
9	BKMA	36	7	11	18	36	53	−17	32	
10	Lernayin Artsakh (R)	36	5	7	24	16	59	−43	22	Relegation to the Armenian First League

Source: FFA Soccerway
Rules for classification: 1) Points; 2) Head-to-head points; 3) Head-to-head goal difference; 4) Head-to-head goals scored; 5) Matches won; 6) Goal difference; 7) Less red cards; 8) Less yellow cards ; 9) Fair-play ranking 10) Draw
(C) Champions; (R) Relegated

=== Armenian Cup ===
6 October 2022 First round	Lernayin Artsakh	1–3	Van	Vayk
15:00 (UTC+4)	Asryan (yellow card) 36'; Ojetunde 81'	Report	Ahmed 14'; Bilyi (yellow card) 34'; Mytsyk 37' (yellow card) 88'; Buhari 86'	Stadium: Arevik Stadium; Referee: Zaven Hovhannisyan

24 November 2022 Quarterfinal	Shirak	2–0	Van	Gyumri
18:00 (UTC+4)	Vardanyan (yellow card) 37'; Doumbia 45+1'; Sadoyan (yellow card) 90+1'; Gevorkyan 90+6'	Report	Asoyan (yellow card) 47'; Harutyunyan (yellow card) 86'; N.Hovhannisyan (red card) 90+5'	Stadium: Gyumri City Stadium; Referee: Artem Gasparyan

== Statistics ==
As of match played 4 June 2023

=== Appearances and goals ===
No.	Pos	Nat	Player	Total		Premier League		Armenian Cup	
No.	Pos	Nat	Player	Apps	Goals	Apps	Goals	Apps	Goals
1	GK	(Russia) RUS	Samur Agamagomedov	24	0	22	0	2	0
2	DF	(Armenia) ARM	Vaspurak Minasyan	37	1	33+2	1	2	0
3	DF	(Armenia) ARM	Artur Kartashyan	9	0	8+1	0	0	0
5	DF	(Armenia) ARM	Armen Manucharyan	13	0	12+1	0	0	0
7	FW	(Armenia) ARM	Edgar Movsesyan	38	9	29+7	9	2	0
8	MF	(Armenia) ARM	Rumyan Hovsepyan	12	3	10+2	3	0	0
9	FW	(Kazakhstan) KAZ	Danil Ankudinov	17	4	12+5	4	0	0
11	MF	(Armenia) ARM	David Manoyan	10	1	9+1	1	0	0
12	GK	(Armenia) ARM	Artur Melkonyan	1	0	0+1	0	0	0
14	MF	(Nigeria) NGA	Christopher Boniface	22	2	9+12	2	0+1	0
17	MF	(Nigeria) NGA	Sani Buhari	25	3	10+13	2	1+1	1
18	MF	(Armenia) ARM	Narek Hovhannisyan	30	1	6+23	1	0+1	0
19	MF	(Kazakhstan) KAZ	Gevorg Najaryan	23	0	15+6	0	2	0
21	DF	(Colombia) COL	Daniel Cifuentes	10	1	10	1	0	0
22	GK	(Bolivia) BOL	Diego Zamora	12	0	12	0	0	0
23	MF	(Armenia) ARM	Pavel Gorelov	36	3	21+13	3	1+1	0
27	MF	(Ivory Coast) CIV	Josue Gaba	27	1	14+12	1	1	0
30	DF	(Argentina) ARG	Manuel Morello	16	1	14+2	1	0	0
33	DF	(Armenia) ARM	Hamlet Asoyan	35	0	28+5	0	2	0
37	DF	(Nigeria) NGA	Ibrahim Yahaya	5	0	1+4	0	0	0
70	FW	(Venezuela) VEN	Wilson Barrios	8	0	5+3	0	0	0
77	MF	(Ghana) GHA	Mohammed Fatau	1	0	0+1	0	0	0
87	MF	(Armenia) ARM	Gegham Kadimyan	10	1	3+7	1	0	0
90	FW	(Nigeria) NGA	Bismark Ubah	2	0	1+1	0	0	0
99	DF	(Armenia) ARM	Arman Mkrtchyan	12	0	8+4	0	0	0
Players away on loan:
10	FW	(Ivory Coast) CIV	Ipehe Williams	17	1	10+6	1	0+1	0
Players who left Van during the season:
4	DF	(Ukraine) UKR	Bohdan Mytsyk	13	3	10+1	2	2	1
6	DF	(Russia) RUS	Daur Chanba	3	0	1+1	0	0+1	0
8	MF	(Georgia (country)) GEO	Shota Gvazava	20	0	19	0	1	0
9	FW	(Nigeria) NGA	Goodnews Igbokwe	1	0	0+1	0	0	0
11	MF	(Armenia) ARM	Eduard Avagyan	3	0	1+2	0	0	0
20	DF	(Ecuador) ECU	Silvio Gutiérrez	14	0	10+4	0	0	0
22	FW	(Armenia) ARM	Gegham Harutyunyan	18	0	10+6	0	0+2	0
28	DF	(Armenia) ARM	Alexander Hovhannisyan	1	0	1	0	0	0
30	DF	(Armenia) ARM	Artur Stepanyan	7	0	1+5	0	0+1	0
33	MF	(Russia) RUS	Alan Tatayev	14	0	13	0	1	0
55	GK	(Ukraine) UKR	Yevhen Hrytsenko	2	0	2	0	0	0
77	DF	(Serbia) SRB	Milan Lalic	9	0	7+1	0	1	0
91	FW	(Nigeria) NGA	Mubarak Ahmed	16	2	5+9	1	2	1
94	FW	(Armenia) ARM	Davit Arshakyan	1	0	0	0	0+1	0
99	MF	(Ukraine) UKR	Artem Bilyi	18	2	14+2	2	2	0

=== Goal scorers ===
Place	Position	Nation	Number	Name	Premier League	Armenian Cup	Total
1	FW	(Armenia)	9	Edgar Movsesyan	9	0	9
2	FW	(Kazakhstan)	9	Danil Ankudinov	4	0	4
3	MF	(Armenia)	8	Rumyan Hovsepyan	3	0	3
3	MF	(Armenia)	23	Pavel Gorelov	3	0	3
3	DF	(Ukraine)	4	Bohdan Mytsyk	2	1	3
3	MF	(Nigeria)	17	Sani Buhari	2	1	3
7	MF	(Ukraine)	99	Artem Bilyi	2	0	2
7	MF	(Nigeria)	14	Christopher Boniface	2	0	2
7	FW	(Nigeria)	91	Mubarak Ahmed	1	1	2
10	DF	(Armenia)	2	Vaspurak Minasyan	1	0	1
10	DF	(Argentina)	30	Manuel Morello	1	0	1
10	DF	(Colombia)	21	Daniel Cifuentes	1	0	1
10	MF	(Ivory Coast)	27	Josue Gaba	1	0	1
10	MF	(Armenia)	11	David Manoyan	1	0	1
10	FW	(Armenia)	87	Gegham Kadimyan	1	0	1
10	MF	(Armenia)	18	Narek Hovhannisyan	1	0	1
10	FW	(Ivory Coast)	10	Ipehe Williams	1	0	1
				TOTALS	38	3	41

=== Clean sheets ===
Place	Position	Nation	Number	Name	Premier League	Armenian Cup	Total
1	GK	(Russia)	1	Samur Agamagomedov	6	0	6
2	GK	(Bolivia)	22	Diego Zamora	2	0	2
3	GK	(Ukraine)	55	Yevhen Hrytsenko	1	0	1
				TOTALS	9	0	9

=== Disciplinary record ===
Number	Nation	Position	Name	Premier League		Armenian Cup		Total	
Number	Nation	Position	Name	Booked	Sent off (straight red)	Booked	Sent off (straight red)	Booked	Sent off (straight red)
1	(Russia)	GK	Samur Agamagomedov	1	0	0	0	1	0
3	(Armenia)	DF	Artur Kartashyan	2	1	0	0	2	1
5	(Armenia)	DF	Armen Manucharyan	3	0	0	0	3	0
7	(Armenia)	FW	Edgar Movsesyan	3	0	0	0	3	0
8	(Armenia)	MF	Rumyan Hovsepyan	7	1	0	0	7	1
11	(Armenia)	MF	David Manoyan	0	1	0	0	0	1
14	(Nigeria)	MF	Christopher Boniface	2	0	0	0	2	0
17	(Nigeria)	MF	Sani Buhari	5	0	0	0	5	0
19	(Kazakhstan)	MF	Gevorg Najaryan	3	2	0	0	3	2
21	(Colombia)	DF	Daniel Cifuentes	5	1	0	0	5	1
22	(Bolivia)	GK	Diego Zamora	1	0	0	0	1	0
23	(Armenia)	MF	Pavel Gorelov	9	0	0	0	9	0
27	(Ivory Coast)	MF	Josue Gaba	4	0	0	0	4	0
33	(Armenia)	DF	Hamlet Asoyan	10	0	1	0	11	0
37	(Nigeria)	DF	Ibrahim Yahaya	2	1	0	0	2	1
70	(Venezuela)	FW	Wilson Barrios	1	1	0	0	1	1
Players away on loan:
10	(Ivory Coast)	FW	Ipehe Williams	1	0	0	0	1	0
Players who left Van during the season:
4	(Ukraine)	DF	Bohdan Mytsyk	3	0	1	0	4	0
8	(Georgia (country))	MF	Shota Gvazava	2	0	0	0	2	0
18	(Armenia)	MF	Narek Hovhannisyan	5	0	0	1	6	1
20	(Ecuador)	DF	Silvio Gutiérrez	4	0	0	0	4	0
22	(Armenia)	FW	Gegham Harutyunyan	2	0	1	0	3	0
30	(Armenia)	DF	Artur Stepanyan	1	0	0	0	1	0
33	(Russia)	MF	Alan Tatayev	2	0	0	0	2	0
55	(Ukraine)	GK	Yevhen Hrytsenko	2	0	0	0	2	0
77	(Serbia)	DF	Milan Lalic	1	0	0	0	1	0
91	(Nigeria)	FW	Mubarak Ahmed	2	0	0	0	2	0
99	(Ukraine)	MF	Artem Bilyi	2	1	1	0	3	1
			TOTALS	85	9	4	1	89	10
