= List of Armenian football transfers winter 2022–23 =

This is a list of Armenian football transfers in the winter transfer window, by club. Only clubs of the 2022–23 Armenian Premier League are included.

== Armenian Premier League 2022-23 ==
=== Alashkert ===
In: Note: Flags indicate national team as defined under FIFA eligibility rules; some limited exceptions apply. Players may hold more than one non-FIFA nationality.

No.	Pos.	Nation	Player
2	DF	ARM	Serob Grigoryan (from (Armenia) BKMA Yerevan)
5	MF	ARM	Wbeymar (on loan from Ararat-Armenia)
7	MF	ARM	Karen Nalbandyan (from (Armenia) Noah)
10	FW	ARM	Artur Miranyan
15	DF	ARM	Arman Khachatryan (from (Armenia) Noah)
27	DF	VEN	Daniel Carrillo (from (Finland) KuPS)
33	DF	RUS	Vitali Ustinov (from (Belarus) Torpedo-BelAZ Zhodino)
70	DF	KAZ	Timur Rudoselsky (from (Kazakhstan) Turan)
71	GK	UKR	Roman Mysak
77	DF	CRO	Mateo Mužek (from (Kazakhstan) Kyzylzhar)
88	MF	ARM	Aram Kocharyan (from (Belarus) Vitebsk)
94	FW	SRB	Uroš Nenadović (from (Armenia) Pyunik)
95	FW	BRA	Agdon (on loan from Ararat-Armenia)
98	MF	CRO	Ivan Pešić (from (Kazakhstan) Caspiy)
99	FW	ECU	Yeison Bossa Racines (from (Armenia) Lernayin Artsakh)

Out: Note: Flags indicate national team as defined under FIFA eligibility rules; some limited exceptions apply. Players may hold more than one non-FIFA nationality.

No.	Pos.	Nation	Player
2	DF	BRA	Tiago Cametá
5	DF	CIV	Didier Kadio (to (Kazakhstan) Zhetysu)
7	MF	NAM	Wangu Gome
12	GK	ARM	Arman Meliksetyan
15	FW	CIV	Béko Fofana
19	DF	NGA	Deou Dosa (to (Armenia) Lernayin Artsakh)
27	MF	BRA	Lucas Ventura (to (Brazil) Anápolis)
33	DF	ARM	Andranik Voskanyan
55	FW	ARM	Sargis Metoyan (to West Armenia)
70	MF	ARM	Benik Hovhannisyan
71	GK	RUS	Sergei Revyakin (to (Armenia) Ararat Yerevan)
77	MF	ARM	Rumyan Hovsepyan (to (Armenia) Van)
85	FW	ARM	Aleksandr Ter-Tovmasyan (to (Armenia) Ararat Yerevan)
88	DF	BRA	James (to (Armenia) Pyunik)
94	FW	ARM	Karapet Manukyan (to West Armenia)
95	FW	COL	Bladimir Díaz
96	FW	SLV	Kevin Reyes (to (El Salvador) FAS)
97	MF	BOL	Ronald Cuéllar
98	DF	ARM	Vahagn Ayvazyan
99	FW	COL	Fáider Burbano

=== Ararat-Armenia ===
In: Note: Flags indicate national team as defined under FIFA eligibility rules; some limited exceptions apply. Players may hold more than one non-FIFA nationality.

No.	Pos.	Nation	Player
9	MF	ARM	Artur Serobyan (loan return from (Armenia) BKMA Yerevan)
12	MF	KEN	Amos Nondi (from (Georgia (country)) Dila Gori)
16	DF	ARM	Edgar Grigoryan (from (Armenia) Urartu)
17	FW	NGA	Hilary Gong (from (Nigeria) GBS Academy)
25	DF	CRO	Dragan Lovrić (from (Ukraine) Kryvbas Kryvyi Rih)
27	FW	NGA	Taofiq Jibril (from (Slovakia) MŠK Žilina)
32	DF	COL	Carlos Pérez (from (Colombia) Alianza Petrolera)

Out: Note: Flags indicate national team as defined under FIFA eligibility rules; some limited exceptions apply. Players may hold more than one non-FIFA nationality.

No.	Pos.	Nation	Player
4	DF	ARM	Arman Hovhannisyan (to (Armenia) Ararat Yerevan)
6	MF	ARM	Wbeymar (on loan to (Armenia) Alashkert)
9	FW	BRA	Agdon (on loan to (Armenia) Alashkert)
23	DF	ARM	Styopa Mkrtchyan (on loan to (Armenia) BKMA Yerevan)
30	DF	BRA	Romércio (to (Brazil) São Bernardo)

=== Ararat Yerevan ===
In: Note: Flags indicate national team as defined under FIFA eligibility rules; some limited exceptions apply. Players may hold more than one non-FIFA nationality.

No.	Pos.	Nation	Player
2	DF	TUN	Ayman Mahmoud (from (Tunisia) Olympique Béja)
4	DF	FRA	Teddy Mézague
7	FW	CIV	Mohamed Kone
11	FW	ARM	Aleksandr Ter-Tovmasyan (from (Armenia) Alashkert)
14	MF	ARM	Petros Afajanyan (from (Armenia) Noah)
22	DF	SRB	Dušan Mijić (from (Serbia) Mladost Novi Sad)
24	FW	CMR	Hadji Issa Moustapha (from (Cameroon) Gazelle FA de Garoua)
30	FW	NGA	Ibeh Ransom (from (Israel) Hapoel Nir Ramat HaSharon)
71	GK	RUS	Sergei Revyakin (from (Armenia) Alashkert)
77	FW	BUL	Georgi Babaliev (from (Bulgaria) Spartak Varna)
81	MF	COM	Kassim Hadji (from (Switzerland) Stade Nyonnais)
96	DF	ARM	Arman Hovhannisyan (from Ararat-Armenia)
—	MF	ARM	Erik Azizyan (from (Armenia) BKMA Yerevan)

Out: Note: Flags indicate national team as defined under FIFA eligibility rules; some limited exceptions apply. Players may hold more than one non-FIFA nationality.

No.	Pos.	Nation	Player
4	DF	ARM	Yuri Maghakyan (to (Armenia) Syunik)
7	MF	NGA	Isah Aliyu
11	MF	ARM	David Manoyan (to (Armenia) Van)
13	GK	ARM	Arman Simonyan (to (Armenia) Noah)
17	MF	RUS	Timur Pukhov (to (Belarus) Naftan Novopolotsk)
18	MF	ARM	Edgar Malakyan (to (Armenia) Pyunik)
22	DF	ARM	Arman Mkrtchyan (to (Armenia) Van)
24	DF	CIV	Dimitri Legbo (to (Finland) Inter Turku)
26	MF	ARM	Alik Arakelyan (to (Armenia) Lernayin Artsakh)
28	GK	RUS	Artyom Potapov (to (Uzbekistan) Surkhon Termez)
44	DF	COL	Juan Bravo (to (Armenia) Pyunik)
54	MF	GAM	Babu Cham (to (Estonia) Paide Linnameeskond)
92	DF	ARM	Gevorg Arabyan
99	DF	ARM	Robert Darbinyan (to (Armenia) Shirak)

=== BKMA Yerevan ===
In: Note: Flags indicate national team as defined under FIFA eligibility rules; some limited exceptions apply. Players may hold more than one non-FIFA nationality.

No.	Pos.	Nation	Player
2	DF	ARM	Norayr Nikoghosyan (on loan from (Armenia) Noah)
14	MF	ARM	Hamlet Sargsyan (on loan from (Armenia) Urartu)
20	MF	ARM	David Arshakyan (from (Armenia) Van)
30	FW	ARM	Grenik Petrosyan (from (Armenia) Pyunik)
—	DF	ARM	Styopa Mkrtchyan (on loan from Ararat-Armenia)

Out: Note: Flags indicate national team as defined under FIFA eligibility rules; some limited exceptions apply. Players may hold more than one non-FIFA nationality.

No.	Pos.	Nation	Player
2	DF	ARM	Serob Grigoryan (to (Armenia) Alashkert)
10	MF	ARM	Edvard Avagyan (to (Armenia) Syunik)
14	MF	ARM	Erik Azizyan (to (Armenia) Ararat Yerevan)
16	GK	ARM	Henri Avagyan (to (Armenia) Pyunik)
19	MF	ARM	Artur Serobyan (loan return to Ararat-Armenia)
20	FW	ARM	Akhmed Jindoyan
23	MF	ARM	Erjanik Ghubasaryan (to (Armenia) Noah)
24	DF	ARM	Arsen Galstyan

=== Lernayin Artsakh ===
In: Note: Flags indicate national team as defined under FIFA eligibility rules; some limited exceptions apply. Players may hold more than one non-FIFA nationality.

No.	Pos.	Nation	Player
4	DF	JPN	Shogo Kagawa
9	FW	BRA	Emmanuel Vieira (from (Bulgaria) Bdin Vidin)
19	MF	COL	Sebastian Diaz
24	DF	NGA	Deou Dosa (from (Armenia) Alashkert)
25	MF	ARM	Davit Nalbandyan (from (Armenia) Mika)
26	MF	ARM	Alik Arakelyan (from (Armenia) Ararat Yerevan)
29	FW	CIV	Ipehe Williams (on loan from (Armenia) Van)
32	MF	ARM	Ruben Karagulyan (from (Russia) Dynamo Stavropol)
95	GK	ARM	Poghos Ayvazyan (from (Armenia) Shirak)

Out: Note: Flags indicate national team as defined under FIFA eligibility rules; some limited exceptions apply. Players may hold more than one non-FIFA nationality.

No.	Pos.	Nation	Player
9	MF	ARM	Arsen Hovhannisyan (to West Armenia)
11	FW	ECU	Yeison Bossa Racines (to (Armenia) Alashkert)
12	DF	GHA	Michael Peprah

=== Noah ===
In: Note: Flags indicate national team as defined under FIFA eligibility rules; some limited exceptions apply. Players may hold more than one non-FIFA nationality.

No.	Pos.	Nation	Player
1	GK	ROU	Raul Balbarau (on loan from (Hungary) Debreceni)
2	DF	ARM	Arsen Galstyan (from (Armenia) BKMA Yerevan)
10	FW	NGA	Peter Olawale (on loan from (Hungary) Debreceni)
20	MF	ARM	Erjanik Ghubasaryan (from (Armenia) BKMA Yerevan)
21	MF	NGA	Haggai Katoh (on loan from (Nigeria) Plateau United)
66	DF	ARM	Sergey Muradyan (from (Russia) Zenit St.Petersburg)
70	FW	FRA	Alexandre Llovet (from (France) Sète 34)
77	GK	ARM	Arman Simonyan (from (Armenia) Ararat Yerevan)

Out: Note: Flags indicate national team as defined under FIFA eligibility rules; some limited exceptions apply. Players may hold more than one non-FIFA nationality.

No.	Pos.	Nation	Player
5	DF	ARM	Norayr Nikoghosyan (on loan to (Armenia) BKMA Yerevan)
7	MF	ARM	Karen Nalbandyan (to (Armenia) Alashkert)
8	DF	BFA	Dramane Salou (to (Armenia) Urartu)
10	MF	ARM	Armen Nahapetyan
20	MF	ARM	Petros Afajanyan (to (Armenia) Ararat Yerevan)
21	MF	ARM	Patvakan Avetisyan
77	GK	ARM	Vardan Shahatuni
94	DF	ARM	Arman Khachatryan (to (Armenia) Alashkert)
96	GK	ARM	Anatoly Ayvazov
97	DF	RUS	Aleksandr Nesterov

=== Pyunik ===
In: Note: Flags indicate national team as defined under FIFA eligibility rules; some limited exceptions apply. Players may hold more than one non-FIFA nationality.

No.	Pos.	Nation	Player
5	DF	BRA	James (from (Armenia) Alashkert)
7	MF	ARM	Edgar Malakyan (from (Armenia) Ararat Yerevan)
8	DF	COL	Juan Bravo (from (Armenia) Ararat Yerevan)
12	FW	HAI	Jonel Désiré (from (Cyprus) Olympiakos Nicosia)
16	GK	ARM	Henri Avagyan (from (Armenia) BKMA Yerevan)
20	MF	BRA	Lucas Villela (from (Latvia) Liepāja)

Out: Note: Flags indicate national team as defined under FIFA eligibility rules; some limited exceptions apply. Players may hold more than one non-FIFA nationality.

No.	Pos.	Nation	Player
1	GK	ARM	David Yurchenko
3	DF	SRB	Boris Varga (to (Serbia) Radnički Niš)
5	DF	SRB	Zoran Gajić
8	MF	BRA	Andre Mensalao (to (Cyprus) Ethnikos Achna)
19	FW	ARM	Grenik Petrosyan (to (Armenia) BKMA Yerevan)
20	MF	SRB	Nemanja Mladenović
23	MF	ARM	Aras Özbiliz (to (Armenia) Urartu)
24	FW	MKD	Marjan Radeski (to (North Macedonia) Struga)
26	MF	VEN	Renzo Zambrano (to (United States) Phoenix Rising)
28	FW	UKR	Robert Hehedosh (loan return to (Ukraine) Peremoha Dnipro)
30	DF	VEN	Alexander González (to (Venezuela) Caracas)
70	FW	SRB	Uroš Nenadović (to (Armenia) Alashkert)
77	FW	SEN	Dame Diop
87	FW	ARM	Aleksandr Karapetyan

=== Shirak ===
In: Note: Flags indicate national team as defined under FIFA eligibility rules; some limited exceptions apply. Players may hold more than one non-FIFA nationality.

No.	Pos.	Nation	Player
1	GK	RUS	Egor Achinov (from (Russia) FDC Vista Gelendzhik)
23	FW	CIV	Vally Cisse
27	FW	CIV	Abdul Samir Koné
99	DF	ARM	Robert Darbinyan (from (Armenia) Ararat Yerevan)

Out: Note: Flags indicate national team as defined under FIFA eligibility rules; some limited exceptions apply. Players may hold more than one non-FIFA nationality.

No.	Pos.	Nation	Player
1	GK	ARM	Poghos Ayvazyan (to (Armenia) Lernayin Artsakh)
7	MF	ARM	Arman Aslanyan
10	FW	RUS	Artyom Gevorkyan (to West Armenia)
11	MF	ARM	Grigor Muradyan (to (Belarus) Volna Pinsk)

=== Urartu ===
In: Note: Flags indicate national team as defined under FIFA eligibility rules; some limited exceptions apply. Players may hold more than one non-FIFA nationality.

No.	Pos.	Nation	Player
23	MF	ARM	Aras Özbiliz (from (Armenia) Pyunik)
25	MF	BFA	Dramane Salou (from (Armenia) Noah)
31	DF	UKR	Ivan Zotko (from (Ukraine) Kryvbas Kryvyi Rih)
35	DF	BRA	Rafael Carioca (from (Brazil) América de Natal)
77	MF	RUS	Temur Dzhikiya (on loan from (Russia) Volga Ulyanovsk)
99	DF	FRA	Yaya Sanogo

Out: Note: Flags indicate national team as defined under FIFA eligibility rules; some limited exceptions apply. Players may hold more than one non-FIFA nationality.

No.	Pos.	Nation	Player
23	MF	ARM	Erik Vardanyan (Retired)
25	DF	ARM	Edgar Grigoryan (to Ararat-Armenia)
29	MF	ARM	Hamlet Sargsyan (on loan to (Armenia) BKMA Yerevan)
30	DF	BRA	Everson
38	FW	BRA	Deividi Buiu (loan return to (Brazil) Noroeste)

=== Van ===
In: Note: Flags indicate national team as defined under FIFA eligibility rules; some limited exceptions apply. Players may hold more than one non-FIFA nationality.

No.	Pos.	Nation	Player
3	DF	ARM	Artur Kartashyan (from (Cyprus) Olympiakos Nicosia)
5	DF	ARM	Armen Manucharyan
8	MF	ARM	Rumyan Hovsepyan (from (Armenia) Alashkert)
9	FW	KAZ	Danil Ankudinov (on loan from (Moldova) Sheriff Tiraspol)
11	MF	ARM	David Manoyan (from (Armenia) Ararat Yerevan)
11	MF	EQG	Renato Bengo (from (Spain) La Nucía)
21	DF	COL	Daniel Cifuentes (from (Uruguay) Racing de Montevideo)
22	GK	BOL	Diego Zamora
30	DF	ARG	Manuel Morello (from (Argentina) Central Norte)
55	GK	UKR	Yevhen Hrytsenko (from (Ukraine) Shakhtar Donetsk)
70	FW	VEN	Wilson Barrios (from (Venezuela) Estudiantes de Mérida)
87	FW	ARM	Gegham Kadimyan (from (Belarus) Neman Grodno)
90	FW	NGA	Bismark Ubah
99	DF	ARM	Arman Mkrtchyan (from (Armenia) Ararat Yerevan)

Out: Note: Flags indicate national team as defined under FIFA eligibility rules; some limited exceptions apply. Players may hold more than one non-FIFA nationality.

No.	Pos.	Nation	Player
4	DF	UKR	Bohdan Mytsyk (to (Lithuania) Marijampolė City)
6	DF	RUS	Daur Chanba
8	MF	GEO	Shota Gvazava (to (Uzbekistan) Mash'al Mubarek)
10	FW	CIV	Ipehe Williams (on loan to (Armenia) Lernayin Artsakh)
13	MF	GHA	Emmanuel Mireku
20	DF	ECU	Silvio Gutiérrez
21	GK	ARM	David Papikyan
22	FW	ARM	Gegham Harutyunyan
28	DF	ARM	Alexander Hovhannisyan
30	DF	ARM	Artur Stepanyan
33	MF	RUS	Alan Tatayev
55	GK	UKR	Yevhen Hrytsenko (to (Tajikistan) Ravshan Kulob)
70	DF	RUS	Kirill Antropov
77	DF	SRB	Milan Lalic (to (Bosnia and Herzegovina) Sloga Meridian)
91	FW	NGA	Mubarak Ahmed (to (Romania) Ceahlăul Piatra Neamț)
94	FW	ARM	David Arshakyan (to (Armenia) BKMA Yerevan)
99	MF	UKR	Artem Bilyi (to (Latvia) Liepāja)
