= Uba (surname) =

Uba is an Igbo name. The Igbo or Ibo are people from Southeastern Nigeria. Notable people with the name include:

- Abdalla Uba Adamu (born 1956), Nigerian academic, educator, publisher, filmmaker, ethnomusicologist, and media scholar
- Bashir Uba Mashema, Nigerian politician
- Emmanuel Nnamdi Uba (born 1958), Nigerian politician
- Garba Umaru Uba Yauri, Nigerian politician
- Kembo Uba Kembo (1947–2007), Congolese football midfielder
- Michael Uba, Nigerian actor, comedian, and radio personality
- Ovwigbo Uba (born 1962), Nigerian boxer
- Pamela Uba, Nigerian-Irish scientist, model, and beauty pageant titleholder
- Reginald Uba (1911–1972), Estonian middle-distance runner
- Salihu Zaway Uba, retired Nigerian Army officer
- Titus Uba (born 1965), Nigerian politician
- Toomas Uba (1943–2000), Estonian sports journalist
- Ugochukwu Uba (born 1949), Nigerian politician

== See also ==
- Uba (given name), Nigerian surname
- Ubah, Nigerian surname
- Janry Ubas (born 1994), Filipino athlete
