= 2023–24 FC Van season =

Van
2023–24 season
- Owner: Oleg Ghukasov
- Manager: Sevada Arzumanyan; Arthur Hovhannisyan (from 14 January)
- Stadium: Charentsavan City Stadium
- Premier League: 8th
- Armenian Cup: Quarter-finals vs Pyunik
- Top goalscorer: League: Christopher Boniface (7); All: Christopher Boniface (9)

The 2023–24 season is FC Van's 4th season in Armenian Premier League.

== Season events ==
On 31 July, Van announced the loan signing of Davit Petrosyan from Ararat-Armenia and the loan signing of Vrezh Chiloyan from Pyunik. On the same day, Van announced the signings of free-agents Benik Hovhannisyan and Arman Meliksetyan.

On 1 August, Van announced the signing of Hovhannes Nazaryan from Ararat Yerevan, Grisha Paronyan from Strogino Moscow, Deou Dosa and Olaoluwa Ojetunde from Lernayin Artsakh, Aram Ter-Minasyan from Pyunik, Arsen Yeghiazaryan from Peresvet Domodedovo, Anton Sholokh from Dynamo St.Petersburg and the singing of free-agent Albert Mnatsakanyan.

On 4 August, Van announced the signing of Ibrahim Suaib from Mecklenburg Schwerin.

On 24 August, Van announced the signings of Kristian Mocic from Budućnost Valjevo and free-agent Chukwuebuka Okoronkwo.

On 31 August, Van announced the signing of Raymond Nsoh from FDC Vista.

On 19 September, Armen Manucharyan re-signed for Van.

On 25 December, Hamlet Asoyan left Van by mutual agreement.

On 14 January, Van announced that appointment of Arthur Hovhannisyan as their new head coach.

On 16 January, Arman Meliksetyan and Kristian Močić both left Van.

On 25 January, Van announced the signing of Serginho, from SSD Casarano, on a contract until the end of the season.

On 26 January, Van announced the signing of Matthew Gbomadu on loan for the remainder of the season from Ararat-Armenia.

On 28 January, Van announced the signing of free-agent Momo Touré on a contract until the end of the season.

On 31 January, Van announced the signing of Aleksey Ploshchadny on a contract until the end of the season from Krasnodar.

On 7 February, Van announced the signing of Nemanja Kojcic on a contract until the end of the season from Novi Pazar.

On 8 February, Van announced the signing of Miloš Čupić on a contract until the end of the season from Inđija.

On 13 February, Van announced the signing of Boah Collins on loan from Dreams for the remainder of the season.

On 15 February, Van announced the signing of Hakob Hakobyan on loan for the remainder of the season from Ararat-Armenia.

On 19 February, Van announced the signing of Jefferson Granado on a contract until the end of the season from Botev Plovdiv.

On 22 February, Van announced the signing of Edgar Piloyan from Krasnodar-2 to a one-year contract.

On 26 February, Van announced the signing of Vardan Shahatuni from Cilicia and Grigor Muradyan from Ararat Yerevan, both on contracts until the end of the season.

== Squad ==
As of match played 24 May 2024

Number	Name	Nationality	Position	Date of birth (age)	Signed from	Signed in	Contract ends	Apps.	Goals
Goalkeepers
1	Miloš Čupić	(Serbia)	GK	24 April 1999 (age 27)	Inđija	2024		9	0
12	Aleksey Ploshchadny	(Russia)	GK	21 April 2004 (age 22)	Krasnodar	2024		8	0
13	Vardan Shahatuni	(Armenia)	GK	13 March 1998 (age 28)	Cilicia	2024	2024	0	0
24	Raymond Nsoh	(Ghana)	GK	18 May 2004 (age 22)	Unattached	2023		10	0
45	Aram Ter-Minasyan	(Armenia)	GK	25 July 2005 (age 21)	Pyunik	2023		0	0
Defenders
2	Hovhannes Nazaryan	(Armenia)	DF	11 March 1998 (age 28)	Ararat Yerevan	2023		20	0
5	Nemanja Kojcic	(Serbia)	DF	22 August 1997 (age 28)	Novi Pazar	2024		14	0
6	Armen Manucharyan	(Armenia)	DF	3 February 1995 (age 31)	Unattached	2023		39	0
8	Jefferson Granado	(Colombia)	DF	9 April 2003 (age 23)	Botev Plovdiv	2024	2024	9	0
28	Arsen Yeghiazaryan	(Armenia)	DF	15 January 2000 (age 26)	Peresvet Domodedovo	2023		35	0
37	Ibrahim Yahaya	(Nigeria)	DF	28 March 2000 (age 26)	Right2Win Sports Academy	2022		22	0
99	Arman Mkrtchyan	(Armenia)	DF	9 July 1999 (age 27)	Unattached	2023		41	1
Midfielders
7	Edgar Piloyan	(Armenia)	MF	11 July 2004 (age 22)	Krasnodar-2	2024	2025	17	0
9	Benik Hovhannisyan	(Armenia)	MF	1 May 1993 (age 33)	Unattached	2023		46	2
14	Christopher Boniface	(Nigeria)	MF	1 January 2002 (age 24)	Right2Win Sports Academy	2022		58	12
17	Sani Buhari	(Nigeria)	MF	10 January 2004 (age 22)	Right2Win Sports Academy	2022		50	7
18	Narek Hovhannisyan	(Armenia)	MF	11 June 2002 (age 24)	Ararat-Armenia II	2022		60	2
23	Albert Mnatsakanyan	(Armenia)	MF	9 September 1999 (age 26)	Unattached	2023		23	0
27	Josue Gaba	(Ivory Coast)	MF	12 January 2002 (age 24)	Unattached	2020			
30	Hayk Ghazaryan	(Armenia)	MF	7 April 2004 (age 22)	Falcons	2024		1	0
55	Hakob Hakobyan	(Armenia)	MF	29 March 1997 (age 29)	on loan from Ararat-Armenia	2024	2024	13	0
87	Boah Collins	(Ghana)	MF	24 December 2005 (age 20)	on loan from Dreams	2024	2024	3	0
88	Serginho	(Portugal)	MF	25 September 1996 (age 29)	SSD Casarano	2024	2024	14	0
Forwards
10	Ipehe Williams	(Ivory Coast)	FW	7 August 2001 (age 25)	Unattached	2022		53	2
11	Matthew Gbomadu	(Nigeria)	FW	16 October 2004 (age 21)	on loan from Ararat-Armenia	2024	2024	15	2
20	Momo Touré	(Guinea)	FW	12 January 2002 (age 24)	Unattached	2024	2024	15	6
33	Grigor Muradyan	(Armenia)	FW	6 August 2002 (age 24)	Ararat Yerevan	2024	2024	3	0
70	Olaoluwa Ojetunde	(Nigeria)	FW	6 November 2002 (age 23)	Lernayin Artsakh	2023		30	4
Players away on loan
Players who left during the season
1	Ibrahim Suaib	(Ukraine)	GK	30 November 1998 (age 27)	Mecklenburg Schwerin	2023		1	0
5	Deou Dosa	(Nigeria)	DF	3 February 1995 (age 31)	Lernayin Artsakh	2023			
7	Davit Petrosyan	(Armenia)	MF	13 November 1991 (age 34)	on loan from Ararat-Armenia	2023		3	0
8	Karen Muradyan	(Armenia)	DF	11 March 1998 (age 28)	on loan from Pyunik	2023		6	0
11	David Manoyan	(Armenia)	MF	5 July 1990 (age 36)	Unattached	2023		17	1
12	Arman Meliksetyan	(Armenia)	GK	21 July 1995 (age 31)	Unattached	2023		28	0
19	Vrezh Chiloyan	(Armenia)	FW	6 April 2002 (age 24)	on loan from Pyunik	2023		18	4
20	Jaisen Clifford	(South Africa)	FW	4 February 1996 (age 30)	Unattached	2023		24	3
21	Daniel Cifuentes	(Colombia)	DF	21 April 1999 (age 27)	Racing de Montevideo	2023		15	1
30	Anton Sholokh	(Russia)	MF	20 January 2001 (age 25)	Dynamo St.Petersburg	2023		15	0
33	Hamlet Asoyan	(Armenia)	DF	13 January 1995 (age 31)	Lernayin Artsakh	2022		46	0
77	Mohammed Fatau	(Ghana)	MF	24 December 1992 (age 33)	Spartak Varna	2023		1	0
87	Grisha Paronyan	(Armenia)	FW	14 July 2003 (age 23)	Strogino Moscow	2023		3	0
88	Kristian Močić	(Serbia)	DF	7 February 2000 (age 26)	Budućnost Valjevo	2023		8	0
94	Chukwuebuka Okoronkwo	(Nigeria)	DF	15 January 2000 (age 26)	Unattached	2023		14	0

== Transfers ==
=== In ===
Date	Position	Nationality	Name	From	Fee	Ref.
31 July 2023	GK	(Armenia)	Arman Meliksetyan	Unattached	Free	
31 July 2023	MF	(Armenia)	Benik Hovhannisyan	Unattached	Free	
1 August 2023	GK	(Armenia)	Aram Ter-Minasyan	Pyunik	Undisclosed	
1 August 2023	DF	(Armenia)	Hovhannes Nazaryan	Ararat Yerevan	Undisclosed	
1 August 2023	DF	(Armenia)	Arsen Yeghiazaryan	Peresvet Domodedovo	Undisclosed	
1 August 2023	DF	(Nigeria)	Deou Dosa	Lernayin Artsakh	Undisclosed	
1 August 2023	MF	(Armenia)	Albert Mnatsakanyan	Unattached	Free	
1 August 2023	MF	(Russia)	Anton Sholokh	Dynamo St.Petersburg	Undisclosed	
1 August 2023	FW	(Armenia)	Grisha Paronyan	Strogino Moscow	Undisclosed	
1 August 2023	FW	(Nigeria)	Olaoluwa Ojetunde	Lernayin Artsakh	Undisclosed	
4 August 2023	GK	(Ukraine)	Ibrahim Suaib	Mecklenburg Schwerin	Undisclosed	
24 August 2023	DF	(Nigeria)	Chukwuebuka Okoronkwo	Unattached	Free	
24 August 2023	DF	(Serbia)	Kristian Mocic	Budućnost Valjevo	Undisclosed	
31 August 2023	GK	(Ghana)	Raymond Nsoh	FDC Vista	Undisclosed	
19 September 2023	DF	(Armenia)	Armen Manucharyan	Unattached	Free	
25 January 2024	MF	(Portugal)	Serginho	SSD Casarano	Undisclosed	
28 January 2024	FW	(Guinea)	Momo Touré	Unattached	Free	
31 January 2024	GK	(Russia)	Aleksey Ploshchadny	Krasnodar	Undisclosed	
7 February 2024	DF	(Serbia)	Nemanja Kojcic	Novi Pazar	Undisclosed	
8 February 2024	GK	(Serbia)	Miloš Čupić	Inđija	Undisclosed	
19 February 2024	DF	(Colombia)	Jefferson Granado	Botev Plovdiv	Undisclosed	
22 February 2024	MF	(Armenia)	Edgar Piloyan	Krasnodar-2	Undisclosed	
26 February 2024	GK	(Armenia)	Vardan Shahatuni	Cilicia	Undisclosed	
26 February 2024	FW	(Armenia)	Grigor Muradyan	Ararat Yerevan	Undisclosed	

=== Loans in ===
Date from	Position	Nationality	Name	From	Date to	Ref.
31 July 2023	MF	(Armenia)	Davit Petrosyan	Ararat-Armenia		
31 July 2023	FW	(Armenia)	Vrezh Chiloyan	Pyunik	1 March 2024	
11 August 2023	DF	(Armenia)	Karen Muradyan	Pyunik	1 March 2024	
26 January 2024	FW	(Nigeria)	Matthew Gbomadu	Ararat-Armenia	End of season	
13 February 2024	MF	(Ghana)	Boah Collins	Dreams	End of season	
15 January 2024	MF	(Armenia)	Hakob Hakobyan	Ararat-Armenia	End of season	

=== Out ===
Date	Position	Nationality	Name	To	Fee	Ref.
1 February 2024	DF	(Nigeria)	Deou Dosa	Lernayin Artsakh	Undisclosed	
15 February 2024	DF	(Colombia)	Daniel Cifuentes	Ferro Carril Oeste	Undisclosed	

=== Released ===
Date	Position	Nationality	Name	Joined	Date	Ref.
30 June 2023	GK	(Bolivia)	Diego Zamora	CD Sur-Car		
30 June 2023	GK	(Russia)	Samur Agamagomedov			
30 June 2023	DF	(Armenia)	Vaspurak Minasyan	Noah	25 July 2023	
30 June 2023	DF	(Armenia)	Artur Kartashyan	Istiklol	13 July 2023	
30 June 2023	DF	(Armenia)	Armen Manucharyan	Van	19 September 2023	
30 June 2023	DF	(Armenia)	Vaspurak Minasyan	Noah	25 July 2023	
30 June 2023	DF	(Argentina)	Manuel Morello	Birkirkara	23 July 2024	
30 June 2023	MF	(Armenia)	Rumyan Hovsepyan	Noah	25 July 2023	
30 June 2023	MF	(Armenia)	Gegham Kadimyan			
30 June 2023	MF	(Equatorial Guinea)	Renato Bengo	San Cataldo		
30 June 2023	MF	(Kazakhstan)	Gevorg Najaryan	Atyrau		
30 June 2023	FW	(Nigeria)	Bismark Ubah	Jorge Wilstermann	4 July 2023	
30 June 2023	FW	(Venezuela)	Wilson Barrios			
25 December 2023	DF	(Armenia)	Hamlet Asoyan	Lernayin Artsakh		
31 December 2023	MF	(Armenia)	David Manoyan	Cilicia		
31 December 2023	MF	(Ghana)	Mohammed Fatau			
31 December 2023	FW	(South Africa)	Jaisen Clifford	Etar Veliko Tarnovo		
16 January 2024	GK	(Armenia)	Arman Meliksetyan			
16 January 2024	DF	(Serbia)	Kristian Močić	Redfox Stará Ľubovňa		
17 February 2024	DF	(Nigeria)	Chukwuebuka Okoronkwo	West Armenia	23 February 2024	
28 February 20204	FW	(Armenia)	Grisha Paronyan	Shirak		
5 June 2024	DF	(Nigeria)	Ibrahim Yahaya	El-Kanemi Warriors		
5 June 2024	MF	(Ivory Coast)	Josue Gaba			
7 June 2024	GK	(Ghana)	Raymond Nsoy			
7 June 2024	GK	(Russia)	Aleksey Ploshchadny	Noah	22 June 2024	
7 June 2024	GK	(Serbia)	Miloš Čupić	Paro		
8 June 2024	DF	(Serbia)	Nemanja Kojčić	Tekstilac Odžaci		
8 June 2024	FW	(Armenia)	Hayk Ghazaryan			
8 June 2024	FW	(Armenia)	Grigor Muradyan	Gandzasar Kapan		
13 June 2024	MF	(Nigeria)	Christopher Boniface	Ararat Yerevan	12 September 2024	
13 June 2024	MF	(Nigeria)	Sani Buhari	Pyunik	3 August 2024	
21 June 2024	DF	(Armenia)	Armen Manucharyan	Alashkert	1 August 2024	
21 June 2024	MF	(Armenia)	Albert Mnatsakanyan			
24 June 2024	MF	(Armenia)	Benik Hovhannisyan	Alashkert	1 August 2024	

== Friendlies ==
19 July 2023	Ararat Yerevan	1–0	Van	Dzoraghbyur
11:30 (UTC+4)	Hadji 51'	Report		Stadium: Dzoraghbyur Training Centre

27 January 2024	Ararat Yerevan	0–1	Van	Dzoraghbyur
13:00 (UTC+4)		Report	Hovhannisyan 45'	Stadium: Dzoraghbyur Training Centre

3 February 2024	Ararat Yerevan	3–0	Van	Dzoraghbyur
(UTC+4)	Ransom 28'; Hadji 54'; Doombia 72'	Report		Stadium: Dzoraghbyur Training Centre

9 February 2024	Van	2–0	Shirak	Yerevan
12:00 (UTC+4)	Touré; Gbomadu	Report		Stadium: Yerevan Football Academy Stadium

9 February 2024	Van	3–1	Lernayin Artsakh	Charentsavan
16:00 (UTC+4)	Muradyan; Sani; Serginho	Report	Goal	Stadium: Charentsavan City Stadium

12 February 2024	Van	2–1	West Armenia	Charentsavan
13:00 (UTC+4)	Hovhannisyan; Touré	Report	Goal	Stadium: Charentsavan City Stadium

16 February 2024	BKMA Yerevan	2–2	Van	Yerevan
13:00 (UTC+4)	Goal	Report	Gbomadu; Sani	Stadium: Yerevan Football Academy Stadium

== Competitions ==
=== Overall record ===
Competition	First match	Last match	Starting round	Final position	Record							
Competition	First match	Last match	Starting round	Final position	Pld	W	D	L	GF	GA	GD	Win %
Premier League	29 July 2023	24 May 2024	Matchday 1	9th	36	8	8	20	32	67	−35	22.22
Armenian Cup	23 November 2023	12 March 2024	Second Round	Quarterfinal	2	1	0	1	5	6	−1	50.00
Total					38	9	8	21	37	73	−36	23.68

Last updated: 24 May 2024
Source: Competitions

=== Premier League ===
==== Results summary ====
Overall								Home						Away					
Pld	W	D	L	GF	GA	GD	Pts	W	D	L	GF	GA	GD	W	D	L	GF	GA	GD
36	8	8	20	32	67	−35	32	6	3	9	22	31	−9	2	5	11	10	36	−26

Last updated: 24 May 2024.
Source: See Results

==== Results by round ====
Round	1	2	3	4	5	6	7	8	9	10	11	12	13	14	15	16	17	18	19	20	21	22	23	24	25	26	27	28	29	30	31	32	33	34	35	36
Ground	A	H	A	H	A	H	A	A	H	H	A	H	A	H	A	H	H	A	A	H	A	H	A	H	A	A	H	H	A	H	A	H	A	H	H	A
Result	L	W	D	L	L	L	L	L	L	L	L	W	L	L	L	W	D	L	L	W	W	L	W	W	L	D	D	L	D	L	D	L	L	W	D	D
Position	7	8	6	8	8	8	8	9	9	9	10	10	10	10	10	9	10	10	10	9	8	9	8	7	8	8	8	8	8	8	9	9	9	9	9	9

Updated to match(es) played on 24 May 2024. Source: See Results
A = Away; H = Home; W = Win; D = Draw; L = Loss; V = Void

==== Results ====
29 July 2023 1	Noah	1–0	Van	Armavir
19:00 (UTC+4)	Miranyan 15' (pen.); Tutuarima (yellow card) 90+3'	Report	Buhari (yellow card) 4'; Gaba (yellow card) 20'; Okoronkwo (yellow card) 45+4'; B.Hovhannisyan (yellow card) 79'; Sholokh (yellow card) 90+3'	Stadium: City Stadium; Referee: Zaven Hovhannisyan

5 August 2023 2	Van	1–0	Shirak	Charentsavan
18:00 (UTC+4)	Boniface 49'; Dosa (yellow card) 78'	Report	Darbinyan (yellow card) 76'	Stadium: City Stadium; Referee: Yura Mahtesyan

14 August 2023 3	Alashkert	0–0	Van	Yerevan
17:00 (UTC+4)	Flores (yellow card) 22'; Voskanyan (yellow card) 90+7'; Mensah (yellow card) 90+8'; Yedigaryan (yellow card) 90+9'	Report	Okoronkwo (yellow card) 55'; Asoyan (yellow card) 90+4'	Stadium: Alashkert Stadium; Referee: Yura Mahtesyan

19 August 2023 4	Van	1–2	Ararat Yerevan	Charentsavan
17:00 (UTC+4)	Cifuentes (yellow card) 53'; Ojetunde (yellow card) 55'; B.Hovhannisyan 86'; Meliksetyan (yellow card) 90'; N.Hovhannisyan (yellow card) 90+5'	Report	Mahmoud 19'; Galstyan (yellow card) 38'; Faye (yellow card) 39'; Hakobyan (yellow card) 61'; Hadji (yellow card) 70' (goal) 74'	Stadium: City Stadium; Referee: Vardan Manukyan

27 August 2023 5	Ararat-Armenia	3–0	Van	Yerevan
19:00 (UTC+4)	Serobyan 19', 66' (pen.); Yattara (yellow card) 45+4'; Tera 48'; Terteryan (yellow card) 90+2'	Report	Asoyan (yellow card) 31'; Ojetunde (yellow card) 40'; Boniface (yellow card) 90+1' (yellow-red card) 90+2'; Manoyan (yellow card) 90+2'	Stadium: FFA Stadium; Referee: Ashot Ghaltakhchyan

2 September 2023 6	Van	0–5	Pyunik	Charentsavan
17:00 (UTC+4)	Cifuentes (yellow card) 87' (yellow-red card) 90+1'	Report	Otubanjo 21', 42', 49' (yellow card) 60'; Malakyan 79'; Régis 90+1'	Stadium: City Stadium; Referee: Henrik Nalbandian

14 September 2023 7	West Armenia	2–0	Van	Yerevan
14:00 (UTC+4)	Tarasenko 45' (yellow card) 55'; Gevorkyan (yellow card) 61'; Movsisyan (yellow card) 65'; Eydison 81'; Makhsudyan (yellow card) 88'	Report	Chiloyan (yellow card) 65'; Gaba (yellow card) 68'	Stadium: Junior Sports Stadium; Referee: Ashot Ghaltakhchyan

19 September 2023 8	Urartu	3–1	Van	Armavir
16:00 (UTC+4)	Salou 12'; Dzhikiya 69' (pen.); Maksimenko 90+4'	Report	Boniface 24' (pen.); Mkrtchyan (yellow card) 38'; Yahaya (yellow card) 61'	Stadium: City Stadium; Referee: Artem Gasparyan

24 September 2023 9	Van	1–2	BKMA Yerevan	Charentsavan
15:00 (UTC+4)	Boniface 67' (pen.); Dosa (yellow card) 47' (yellow-red card) 79'; Yeghiazaryan (yellow card) 90+7'	Report	Titizian 23'; Williams 83' (o.g.)	Stadium: City Stadium; Referee: Vardan Vardumyan

30 September 2023 10	Van	0–2	Noah	Charentsavan
15:00 (UTC+4)	Mnatsakanyan (yellow card) 40'	Report	Miljković (yellow card) 21'; Alhaft (yellow card) 26' (goal) 86'; Maia (yellow card) 66'; Vimercati (yellow card) 69'; Mbokani 82'	Stadium: City Stadium; Referee: Yura Mahtesyan

3 October 2023 11	Shirak	2–0	Van	Gyumri
19:00 (UTC+4)	Manukyan 28'; Doh (yellow card) 56'; Pobulić 62' (pen.); Tsarukyan (yellow card) 90+4'	Report	Mnatsakanyan (yellow card) 17'; Meliksetyan (yellow card) 60'	Stadium: City Stadium; Referee: Ashot Ghaltakhchyan

20 October 2023 12	Van	2–1	Alashkert	Charentsavan
15:00 (UTC+4)	Yeghiazaryan 17'; Nsoh (yellow card) 28'; Boniface (yellow card) 32'; Ojetunde 64'	Report	Nalbandyan 81'	Stadium: City Stadium; Referee: Artak Vardanyan

24 October 2023 13	Ararat Yerevan	2–1	Van	Yerevan
18:00 (UTC+4)	Faye (yellow card) 50'; Hakobyan (yellow card) 52'; S.Galstyan (yellow card) 52'; Mani 62'; Lhernault 68' (yellow card) 82'	Report	Boniface 24' (pen.); Dosa (yellow card) 54' (yellow-red card) 60'	Stadium: Republican Stadium; Referee: Artem Gasparyan

28 October 2023 14	Van	0–2	Ararat-Armenia	Charentsavan
15:00 (UTC+4)	Asoyan (yellow card) 10'	Report	Yenne (yellow card) 44'; Bueno 56'; Tera (yellow card) 80'; Duarte 86'	Stadium: City Stadium; Referee: Zaven Hovhannisyan

2 November 2023 15	Pyunik	6–0	Van	Yerevan
14:00 (UTC+4)	Hendriks 6'; Marmentini 35'; Otubanjo 46', 72'; Harutyunyan 63'; Buchnev (yellow card) 68'; Vardanyan 77'	Report	Dosa (yellow card) 68' Mnatsakanyan (yellow card) 80'	Stadium: Junior Sports Stadium; Referee: Yura Mahtesyan

7 November 2023 16	Van	4–1	West Armenia	Charentsavan
14:30 (UTC+4)	Okoronkwo (yellow card) 29'; Manucharyan (yellow card) 43'; Chiloyan (yellow card) 81' (goal) 85' (pen.), 90+4'; Ojetunde 89'; Boniface 90+8'	Report	Mensalão 4' (pen.); Dziov (yellow card) 45+1'	Stadium: City Stadium; Referee: Ashot Harutyunyan

12 November 2023 17	Van	2–2	Urartu	Charentsavan
14:30 (UTC+4)	Boniface (yellow card) 10' (goal) 55'; Mkrtchyan (yellow card) 60'; Manucharyan (yellow card) 77'; Buhari 90+10'; Okoronkwo (red card) 90+12'	Report	Dzhikiya 43'; Eduardo 86'; Marcos Júnior (red card) 90+2'; Tsymbalyuk (red card) 90+2'	Stadium: City Stadium; Referee: Ashot Ghaltakhchyan

30 November 2023 18	BKMA Yerevan	7–1	Van	Yerevan
18:00 (UTC+4)	Khamoyan (yellow card) 5'; A.Petrosyan 7', 53'; G.Petrosyan 11', 16', 79'; Simonyan 59' (pen.); Nikoghosyan (yellow card) 70'; Lulukyan 90+3'	Report	Chiloyan (yellow card) 58' (goal) 90+2' (pen.)	Stadium: FAA Stadium; Referee: Artem Gasparyan

4 December 2023 19	Noah	3–1	Van	Abovyan
16:00 (UTC+4)	Manvelyan (yellow card) 21'; Miranyan 32', 45+3'; Maia (yellow card) 45'; Gladon 90+7'	Report	Chiloyan (yellow card) 47'; Ojetunde (yellow card) 64'; B.Hovhannisyan (yellow card) 79'; Williams 84'	Stadium: City Stadium; Referee: Zaven Hovhannisyan

9 December 2023 20	Van	4–0	Shirak	Charentsavan
14:00 (UTC+4)	N.Hovhannisyan 52'; Ojetunde 64'; Nazaryan (yellow card) 68'; Mkrtchyan 81'; Urushanyan 90' (o.g.)Urushanyan (yellow card) 90+5'	Report	Misakyan (yellow card) 80'	Stadium: City Stadium; Referee: Henrik Nalbandian

23 February 2024 21	Alashkert	0–1	Van	Yerevan
15:00 (UTC+4)	Désiré (yellow card) 41'	Report	Yahaya (yellow card) 17'; Touré 38'	Stadium: Alashkert Stadium; Referee: Artem Gasparyan

28 February 2024 22	Van	0–2	Ararat Yerevan	Charentsavan
15:00 (UTC+4)	Kojcic (yellow card) 89'; Manucharyan (yellow card) 90+4'	Report	Mkrtchyan 21' (yellow card) 61'; Malakyan (yellow card) 45+3'; Khachumyan (yellow card) 49'; Hadji 80'	Stadium: City Stadium; Referee: Ashot Harutyunyan

3 March 2024 23	Ararat-Armenia	0–2	Van	Yerevan
15:00 (UTC+4)	Muradyan (red card) 51'; Castanheira (yellow card) 90+3'	Report	Yahaya (yellow card) 39'; Mkrtchyan (yellow card) 49'; Buhari 59'; Yeghiazaryan (yellow card) 63'; Ojetunde 90+9'	Stadium: FFA Stadium; Referee: Yura Mahtesyan

8 March 2024 24	Van	1–0	Pyunik	Charentsavan
15:00 (UTC+4)	Touré 15'; Buhari (yellow card) 51'; Kojcic (yellow card) 90+3'; Yeghiazaryan (yellow card) 90+5'	Report	Caraballo (yellow card) 12'; Grigoryan (yellow card) 52'; Otubanjo (yellow card) 89'	Stadium: City Stadium; Referee: Henrik Nalbandian

17 March 2024 25	West Armenia	2–0	Van	Yerevan
16:00 (UTC+4)	Strelnik 45+2' (pen.); Ufuoma (yellow card) 55'; Martirosyan (yellow card) 82'; Tarasenko 85'	Report	Piloyan (yellow card) 65'	Stadium: Junior Sports Stadium; Referee: Sargis Khachatryan

30 March 2024 26	Urartu	1–1	Van	Yerevan
19:00 (UTC+4)	Dzhikiya 22'; Margaryan (yellow card) 64'; Melikhov (yellow card) 76'	Report	Granado (yellow card) 20'; Touré 77' (pen.)	Stadium: Urartu Stadium; Referee: Artak Vardanyan

6 April 2024 27	Van	2–2	BKMA Yerevan	Charentsavan
16:00 (UTC+4)	Hakobyan (yellow card) 54'; Boniface (yellow card) 74' (goal) 90+9' (pen.); Piloyan (yellow card) 80'; Serginho (yellow card) 90+6'; Gbomadu 90+7'	Report	Eloyan 26'; G.Petrosyan (yellow card) 80' (goal) 85'; Sargsyan (yellow card) 90+8'	Stadium: City Stadium; Referee: Vardan Vardumyan

11 April 2024 28	Van	0–1	Noah	Charentsavan
16:00 (UTC+4)	Piloyan (yellow card) 79'	Report	Miranyan (yellow card) 36' (goal) 90+1'; Alhaft (yellow card) 90+3'; Mathieu (yellow card) 90+8'	Stadium: City Stadium; Referee: Vardan Manukyan

18 April 2024 29	Shirak	0–0	Van	Gyumri
19:00 (UTC+4)	Traore (yellow card) 60'; Urushanyan (yellow card) 89'	Report	Touré (yellow card) 56'; Hakobyan (yellow card) 58'; Boniface (yellow card) 72'	Stadium: City Stadium; Referee: Yura Mahtesyan

22 April 2024 30	Van	2–3	Alashkert	Charentsavan
15:00 (UTC+4)	Touré 51' (pen.); Kojcic (yellow card) 67'; Gbomadu 88'	Report	Yedigaryan 34'; Désiré (yellow card) 37'; Khurtsidze 90+3', 90+5'	Stadium: City Stadium; Referee: Hovhannes Kalantaryan

26 April 2024 31	Ararat Yerevan	1–1	Van	Yerevan
19:00 (UTC+4)	Faye (yellow card) 25'; Moustapha 66'	Report	Hovhannisyan 50'; Manucharyan (yellow card) 60'; Kojcic (yellow card) 65'	Stadium: Republican Stadium; Referee: Ashot Ghaltakhchyan

2 May 2024 32	Van	0–5	Ararat-Armenia	Charentsavan
16:00 (UTC+4)	Manucharyan (yellow card) 45+1'	Report	Alemão (yellow card) 21'; Shaghoyan 45+2', 62'; Muradyan (yellow card) 47'; Serobyan 69', 90+1' (pen.); Rodríguez 75'	Stadium: City Stadium; Referee: Zaven Hovhannisyan

9 May 2024 33	Pyunik	3–1	Van	Yerevan
16:00 (UTC+4)	Kovalenko (yellow card) 38'; Gonçalves 43'; Cociuc 73'; Otubanjo 80'	Report	Buhari 15'	Stadium: Junior Sports Stadium; Referee: Ashot Ghaltakhchyan

14 May 2024 34	Van	1–0	West Armenia	Charentsavan
17:00 (UTC+4)	Boniface 8'; B.Hovhannisyan (yellow card) 78'; Hakobyan (yellow card) 80'; Yahaya (yellow card) 77' (yellow-red card) 82'; Touré (yellow card) 88'	Report	Isaac (yellow card) 32'; Hakobyan (yellow card) 76'; Oparaocha (yellow card) 90+4'	Stadium: City Stadium; Referee: Artak Vardanyan

20 May 2024 35	Van	1–1	Urartu	Charentsavan
17:00 (UTC+4)	Touré 16'; Hakobyan (yellow card) 51'; Boniface (yellow card) 80'	Report	Mirzoyan 44'; Aghasaryan (yellow card) 55'; Simonyan (yellow card) 82'; Dzhikiya (yellow card) 83'	Stadium: City Stadium; Referee: Zaven Hovhannisyan

24 May 2024 36	BKMA Yerevan	0–0	Van	Yerevan
17:00 (UTC+4)		Report	Kojcic (yellow card) 52'; Yeghiazaryan (yellow card) 82'; Gbomadu (yellow card) 90+1'	Stadium: FAA Stadium; Referee: Tiran Yeritsyan

==== Table ====
Pos	Team	Pld	W	D	L	GF	GA	GD	Pts	Qualification or relegation
1	Pyunik (C)	36	24	10	2	84	28	+56	82	Qualification for the Champions League first qualifying round
2	Noah	36	26	2	8	69	33	+36	80	Qualification for the Conference League first qualifying round
3	Ararat-Armenia	36	23	6	7	73	34	+39	75	Qualification for the Conference League second qualifying round (Note: Ararat-Armenia qualified for the Conference League second qualifying round by winning the 2023–24 Armenian Cup. Since they qualified based on league position, the second Conference League first round spot was passed to the fourth-placed team.)
4	Urartu	36	13	11	12	49	49	0	50	Qualification for the Conference League first qualifying round
5	Alashkert	36	13	6	17	54	56	−2	45	
6	Ararat Yerevan	36	13	6	17	39	50	−11	45	
7	West Armenia	36	11	4	21	43	73	−30	37	
8	Shirak	36	8	9	19	28	46	−18	33	
9	Van	36	8	8	20	32	67	−35	32	
10	BKMA	36	7	6	23	32	67	−35	27	

Source: FFA Soccerway
Rules for classification: 1) Points; 2) Head-to-head points; 3) Head-to-head goal difference; 4) Head-to-head goals scored; 5) Matches won; 6) Goal difference; 7) Less red cards; 8) Less yellow cards; 9) Fair-play ranking 10) Draw
(C) Champions

=== Armenian Cup ===
23 November 2023 Second Round	Van	2–1	West Armenia	Charentsavan
14:00 (UTC+4)	Chiloyan (yellow card) 45+9' (goal) 51'; Okoronkwo (yellow card) 45+14'; Boniface 45+20' (pen.)	Report	Khachatryan 54'	Stadium: City Stadium; Referee: Yura Mahtesyan

12 March 2024 Quarterfinal	Pyunik	5–3	Van	Yerevan
15:00 (UTC+4)	Bravo 16', 87'; Juričić 29', 67'; Harutyunyan 35'	Report	Touré 3' (pen.); Sani 23'; Boniface 50' (pen.) (yellow card) 75'; Kojčić (yellow card) 83'; Manucharyan (yellow card) 85'	Stadium: Junior Sports Stadium; Referee: Artem Gasparyan

== Statistics ==
As of match played 24 May 2024

=== Appearances and goals ===
No.	Pos	Nat	Player	Total		Premier League		Armenian Cup	
No.	Pos	Nat	Player	Apps	Goals	Apps	Goals	Apps	Goals
1	GK	(Serbia) SRB	Miloš Čupić	9	0	9	0	0	0
2	DF	(Armenia) ARM	Hovhannes Nazaryan	20	0	17+2	0	1	0
5	DF	(Serbia) SRB	Nemanja Kojcic	14	0	11+2	0	1	0
6	DF	(Armenia) ARM	Armen Manucharyan	26	0	19+5	0	2	0
7	MF	(Armenia) ARM	Edgar Piloyan	17	0	15+1	0	1	0
8	DF	(Colombia) COL	Jefferson Granado	9	0	6+3	0	0	0
9	MF	(Armenia) ARM	Benik Hovhannisyan	35	2	21+13	2	1	0
10	FW	(Ivory Coast) CIV	Ipehe Williams	19	1	14+4	1	1	0
11	FW	(Nigeria) NGA	Matthew Gbomadu	15	2	14	2	1	0
12	GK	(Russia) RUS	Aleksey Ploshchadny	8	0	7	0	1	0
14	MF	(Nigeria) NGA	Christopher Boniface	36	10	28+6	8	1+1	2
17	MF	(Nigeria) NGA	Sani Buhari	25	4	11+12	3	1+1	1
18	MF	(Armenia) ARM	Narek Hovhannisyan	19	1	8+11	1	0	0
20	FW	(Guinea) GUI	Momo Touré	15	6	12+2	5	1	1
23	MF	(Armenia) ARM	Albert Mnatsakanyan	23	0	9+13	0	0+1	0
24	GK	(Ghana) GHA	Raymond Nsoy	10	0	9	0	1	0
27	MF	(Ivory Coast) CIV	Josue Gaba	19	0	8+10	0	0+1	0
28	DF	(Armenia) ARM	Arsen Yeghiazaryan	35	1	31+2	1	2	0
30	MF	(Armenia) ARM	Hayk Ghazaryan	1	0	0+1	0	0	0
33	FW	(Armenia) ARM	Grigor Muradyan	3	0	0+3	0	0	0
37	DF	(Nigeria) NGA	Ibrahim Yahaya	17	0	8+7	0	0+2	0
55	MF	(Armenia) ARM	Hakob Hakobyan	13	0	11+1	0	1	0
70	FW	(Nigeria) NGA	Olaoluwa Ojetunde	30	4	12+17	4	0+1	0
87	MF	(Ghana) GHA	Boah Collins	3	0	0+3	0	0	0
88	MF	(Portugal) POR	Serginho	14	0	13	0	1	0
99	DF	(Armenia) ARM	Arman Mkrtchyan	29	1	22+5	1	2	0
Players away on loan:
Players who left Van during the season:
1	GK	(Ukraine) UKR	Ibrahim Suaib	1	0	1	0	0	0
5	DF	(Nigeria) NGA	Deou Dosa	17	0	14+2	0	1	0
7	MF	(Armenia) ARM	Davit Petrosyan	3	0	0+3	0	0	0
8	DF	(Armenia) ARM	Karen Muradyan	6	0	1+4	0	0+1	0
11	MF	(Armenia) ARM	David Manoyan	7	0	5+2	0	0	0
12	GK	(Armenia) ARM	Arman Meliksetyan	10	0	10	0	0	0
19	FW	(Armenia) ARM	Vrezh Chiloyan	18	4	6+11	3	1	1
20	FW	(South Africa) RSA	Jaisen Clifford	8	0	2+6	0	0	0
21	DF	(Colombia) COL	Daniel Cifuentes	5	0	5	0	0	0
30	MF	(Russia) RUS	Anton Sholokh	15	0	9+5	0	0+1	0
33	DF	(Armenia) ARM	Hamlet Asoyan	11	0	11	0	0	0
87	FW	(Armenia) ARM	Grisha Paronyan	3	0	0+3	0	0	0
88	DF	(Serbia) SRB	Kristian Močić	8	0	4+3	0	0+1	0
94	DF	(Nigeria) NGA	Chukwuebuka Okoronkwo	14	0	13	0	1	0

=== Goal scorers ===
Place	Position	Nation	Number	Name	Premier League	Armenian Cup	Total
1	MF	(Nigeria)	14	Christopher Boniface	8	2	10
2	FW	(Guinea)	20	Momo Touré	5	1	6
3	FW	(Nigeria)	70	Olaoluwa Ojetunde	4	0	4
3	FW	(Armenia)	19	Vrezh Chiloyan	3	1	4
3	MF	(Nigeria)	17	Sani Buhari	3	1	4
6	FW	(Nigeria)	11	Matthew Gbomadu	2	0	2
6	MF	(Armenia)	9	Benik Hovhannisyan	2	0	2
8	DF	(Armenia)	28	Arsen Yeghiazaryan	1	0	1
8	FW	(Ivory Coast)	10	Ipehe Williams	1	0	1
8	MF	(Armenia)	18	Narek Hovhannisyan	1	0	1
8	DF	(Armenia)	99	Arman Mkrtchyan	1	0	1
8				Own goal	1	0	1
				TOTALS	32	5	37

=== Clean sheets ===
Place	Position	Nation	Number	Name	Premier League	Armenian Cup	Total
1	GK	(Serbia)	1	Miloš Čupić	4	0	4
2	GK	(Armenia)	12	Arman Meliksetyan	2	0	2
2	GK	(Russia)	12	Aleksey Ploshchadny	2	0	2
4	GK	(Ghana)	24	Raymond Nsoy	1	0	1
				TOTALS	9	0	9

=== Disciplinary record ===
Number	Nation	Position	Name	Premier League		Armenian Cup		Total	
Number	Nation	Position	Name	Booked	Sent off (straight red)	Booked	Sent off (straight red)	Booked	Sent off (straight red)
2	(Armenia)	DF	Hovhannes Nazaryan	1	0	0	0	1	0
5	(Serbia)	DF	Nemanja Kojcic	5	0	1	0	6	0
6	(Armenia)	DF	Armen Manucharyan	5	0	1	0	6	0
7	(Armenia)	MF	Edgar Piloyan	3	0	0	0	3	0
8	(Colombia)	DF	Jefferson Granado	1	0	0	0	1	0
9	(Armenia)	MF	Benik Hovhannisyan	3	0	0	0	3	0
11	(Nigeria)	FW	Matthew Gbomadu	1	0	0	0	1	0
14	(Nigeria)	MF	Christopher Boniface	7	1	1	0	8	1
17	(Nigeria)	MF	Sani Buhari	2	0	0	0	2	0
18	(Armenia)	MF	Narek Hovhannisyan	1	0	0	0	1	0
20	(Guinea)	FW	Momo Touré	2	0	0	0	2	0
23	(Armenia)	MF	Albert Mnatsakanyan	3	0	0	0	3	0
24	(Ghana)	GK	Raymond Nsoy	1	0	0	0	1	0
28	(Armenia)	DF	Arsen Yeghiazaryan	4	0	0	0	4	0
27	(Ivory Coast)	MF	Josue Gaba	2	0	0	0	2	0
30	(Russia)	MF	Anton Sholokh	1	0	0	0	1	0
37	(Nigeria)	DF	Ibrahim Yahaya	4	1	0	0	4	1
55	(Armenia)	MF	Hakob Hakobyan	4	0	0	0	4	0
70	(Nigeria)	FW	Olaoluwa Ojetunde	3	0	0	0	3	0
88	(Portugal)	MF	Serginho	1	0	0	0	1	0
99	(Armenia)	DF	Arman Mkrtchyan	3	0	0	0	3	0
Players away on loan:
Players who left Van during the season:
5	(Nigeria)	DF	Deou Dosa	6	2	0	0	6	2
11	(Armenia)	MF	David Manoyan	1	0	0	0	1	0
12	(Armenia)	GK	Arman Meliksetyan	2	0	0	0	2	0
19	(Armenia)	FW	Vrezh Chiloyan	4	0	1	0	5	0
21	(Colombia)	DF	Daniel Cifuentes	3	1	0	0	3	1
33	(Armenia)	DF	Hamlet Asoyan	3	0	0	0	3	0
94	(Nigeria)	DF	Chukwuebuka Okoronkwo	3	1	1	0	4	1
			TOTALS	77	6	5	0	82	6
