= Uba =

Uba or UBA (and diacritic variations) may refer to:

== Agriculture ==
- Uba, a cultivar of Saccharum sinense

== Places ==
- Ubá, city in the state of Minas Gerais, Brazil
- Uba, Nigeria, part of Askira/Uba Local Government Area in Borno State
- Uba River, in Kazakhstan

== People ==
- Uba (given name)
- Uba (surname)

== Abbreviations ==
- Royal Union of Belgian Radio Amateurs
- Union of Burma Airways, former name of Myanmar National Airlines
- Umweltbundesamt, the German Environment Agency
- Union Byblos Amchit, a former name of Byblos Club, a multi sports club based in Byblos, Lebanon
- United Baloch Army, a Baloch nationalist militant group designated as a terrorist organisation by the Pakistani government
- United Bank for Africa, an International bank with headquarters in Lagos, Nigeria
- United Basketball Alliance of India
  - UBA Pro Basketball League
- Universal Basketball Association, a semi-professional US men's basketball league
- Universidad de Buenos Aires, University of Buenos Aires, Argentina
- User Behavior Analytics
