= Ubah =

Ubah is both a given name and a surname. Notable people with the name include:

== Given name ==
- Ubah Ali (born 1996), social activist and feminist from Somaliland who campaigns against FGM
- Ubah Hassan (born 1983), Somali-Canadian model, businesswoman and television personality

== Surname ==
- Bismark Ubah (born 1994), Nigerian professional footballer
- Calister Ubah (born 1973), Nigerian sprinter
- Ifeanyi Ubah (born 1971), Nigerian businessman, entrepreneur and Senator
- John Ubah, Administrator of Kebbi State in Nigeria from August 1996 to August 1998
- Rufina Ubah (born 1959), former Nigerian sprinter
