= Reginald Uba =

Estonian middle-distance runner

Personal information
- Nationality: Estonian
- Born: 26 July 1911 Kohtla Parish, Governorate of Estonia, Russian Empire
- Died: 15 August 1972 (aged 61) Tallinn, Estonia

Sport
- Sport: Middle-distance running
- Event: 1500 metres

Reginald Uba (26 July 1911 in Kohtla Paish – 15 August 1972 in Tallinn) was an Estonian middle-distance runner. He competed in the men's 1500 metres at the 1936 Summer Olympics.

His son was sports journalist Toomas Uba (1943–2000).
