= Pavel Gorelov =

Russian footballer

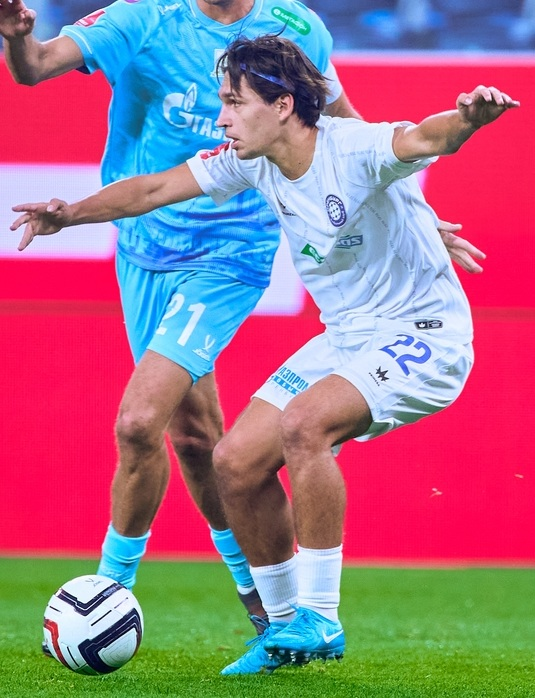
- Gorelov with Orenburg in 2025

Personal information
- Full name: Pavel Vartanovich Gorelov
- Date of birth: 22 January 2003 (age 23)
- Place of birth: Rostov-on-Don, Russia
- Height: 1.76 m (5 ft 9 in)
- Position: Midfielder

Team information
- Current team: Rotor Volgograd
- Number: 21

Senior career*
Years	Team	Apps	(Gls)
2020–2023	Rostov	1	(0)
2022–2023	→ Van (loan)	34	(3)
2023–2025	KAMAZ	52	(6)
2025	Chernomorets Novorossiysk	18	(1)
2025–2026	Orenburg	3	(0)
2026–	Rotor Volgograd	0	(0)

International career^{‡}
2021	Armenia U19	2	(1)
2023	Armenia U21	1	(0)
- * Club domestic league appearances and goals as of 17 May 2026 ‡ National team caps and goals as of 15 June 2023

Pavel Vartanovich Gorelov (Armenian: Պավել Վարդանի Գորելով; Russian: Павел Вартанович Горелов; born 22 January 2003) is an Armenian-Russian football player who plays for Rotor Volgograd.

== Club career ==
He made his debut in the Russian Premier League for FC Rostov on 19 June 2020 in a game against PFC Sochi. FC Rostov was forced to field their Under-18 squad in that game as their main squad was quarantined after six players tested positive for COVID-19.

On 24 June 2022, Gorelov joined Armenian club FC Van on a season-long loan.

On 8 July 2023, Gorelov signed with Russian First League club KAMAZ.

On 5 September 2025, Gorelov joined Orenburg in Russian Premier League.

On 3 July 2026, Gorelov moved to Rotor Volgograd on a three-year contract.

== International career ==
In May 2021, he was called up to the Armenia national under-21 football team.

== Personal life ==
Gorelov's grandfather Norayr Mesropyan is also a former football player, he played almost 400 games in the Soviet Top League with Ararat Yerevan and won the league title in the 1973 season, as well as Soviet Cup twice.

== Career statistics ==
As of match played 17 May 2026

Club	Season	League			Cup		Total	
Club	Season	Division	Apps	Goals	Apps	Goals	Apps	Goals
Rostov	2019–20	Russian Premier League	1	0	0	0	1	0
Rostov	2021–22	Russian Premier League	0	0	1	0	1	0
Rostov	Total		1	0	1	0	2	0
Van (loan)	2022–23	Armenian Premier League	34	3	2	0	36	3
KAMAZ	2023–24	Russian First League	31	2	2	0	33	2
KAMAZ	2024–25	Russian First League	21	4	1	0	22	4
KAMAZ	Total		52	6	3	0	55	6
Chernomorets	2024–25	Russian First League	11	1	–		11	1
Chernomorets	2025–26	Russian First League	7	0	–		7	0
Chernomorets	Total		18	1	0	0	18	1
Orenburg	2025–26	Russian Premier League	3	0	5	0	8	0
Career total			108	10	11	0	119	10
