= Armen Manucharyan =

Armenian footballer (born 1995)

Personal information
- Date of birth: 3 February 1995 (age 31)
- Place of birth: Yerevan, Armenia
- Height: 1.77 m (5 ft 10 in)
- Position: Right back

Team information
- Current team: Alashkert
- Number: 4

Senior career*
Years	Team	Apps	(Gls)
2014–2016	Banants	22	(0)
2016–2020	Pyunik	101	(5)
2020	Rotor Volgograd	7	(0)
2021	Aktobe	11	(0)
2021–2022	Urartu	18	(0)
2023–2024	Van	37	(0)
2024–	Alashkert	24	(0)

International career^{‡}
2017–	Armenia	2	(0)
- * Club domestic league appearances and goals as of 1 June 2025 ‡ National team caps and goals as of 12:43, 27 March 2018 (UTC)

Armen Manucharyan (born 3 February 1995) is an Armenian international footballer who plays as a right back, for Alashkert.

== Club career ==
Born in Yerevan, he has played club football for Banants and Pyunik.

On 10 August 2020, he signed with Russian Premier League club FC Rotor Volgograd.

On 27 February 2021, Manucharyan joined Aktobe in Kazakhstan. On 23 June 2021, after 11 games for Aktobe, Manucharyan left the club by mutual consent.

On 18 August 2021, Manucharyan returned to the Armenian Premier League, signing for Urartu. On 2 June 2022 Manucharyan left Urartu by mutual termination of his contract.

On 15 February 2023, Van announced the signing of Manucharyan.

== International career ==
He made his international debut for Armenia in 2017.

== Career statistics ==
=== Club ===
As of match played 23 May 2021

Appearances and goals by club, season and competition
Club	Season	League			National Cup		Continental		Other		Total	
Club	Season	Division	Apps	Goals	Apps	Goals	Apps	Goals	Apps	Goals	Apps	Goals
Pyunik	2015–16	Armenian Premier League	10	1	0	0	0 (Note: Appearances in the UEFA Champions League)	0	0 (Note: Appearance in the Armenian Supercup)	0	10	1
Pyunik	2016–17	Armenian Premier League	30	2	4	0	2 (Note: Appearances in the UEFA Europa League)	0	—		36	2
Pyunik	2017–18	Armenian Premier League	26	0	2	0	2	0	—		30	0
Pyunik	2018–19	Armenian Premier League	19	0	1	0	0	0	—		20	0
Pyunik	2019–20	Armenian Premier League	16	2	1	0	6	0	—		23	2
Pyunik	Total		101	5	8	0	10	0	0	0	119	5
Rotor Volgograd	2020–21	Russian Premier League	7	0	0	0	—		—		7	0
Aktobe	2021	Kazakhstan Premier League	11	0	0	0	—		—		11	0
Urartu	2021–22	Armenian Premier League	18	0	2	0	0	0	—		20	0
Van	2022–23	Armenian Premier League	13	0	0	0	—		—		13	0
Van	2023–24	Armenian Premier League	24	0	2	0	—		—		26	0
Van	Total		37	0	2	0	-	-	-	-	39	0
Career total			174	5	12	0	10	0	0	0	196	5

=== International ===
As of match played 6 September 2018

Appearances and goals by national team and year
National team	Year	Apps	Goals
Armenia	2017	1	0
Armenia	2018	1	0
Total		2	0
