= Ugochukwu Uba =

Nigerian politician

- Born: 22 May 1949 (age 77)
- Education: University of Nigeria Nsukka; Carleton University; Queen's University
- Occupations: Lecturer; Politician
- Title: Senator
- Political party: People Democratic party (PDP)

Ugochukwu Uba (born 22 May 1949) is a Nigerian politician and former senator of the Anambra South Senatorial Zone. In 2021, he was elected as a governorship candidate of a faction of the People's Democratic Party (PDP) in the Anambra State gubernatorial election. He represented Anambra South Senatorial Zone from 2003 to 2007.

== Early life and education ==
He hails from Umuoru village in Uga, Aguata Local Government Area in Anambra State, Nigeria. Ugochukwu finished his primary at St Cyprian Primary School, Port Harcourt. Then did his secondary school at Stella Maris College, Port Harcourt; Rivers State and Government College, Umuahia, Abia State. He started his degree in Political science at University of Nigeria Nsukka (UNN) from 1971 to 1973 before moving to Carleton University, Ottawa where he completed his Bachelor of Arts (B.A. Hons) First Class in political science. He later got his master's degree in Carleton University and then doctorate degree at the Queen's University, Kingston Canada. He was also the National Secretary of Nigerian Political Science Association from 1982–1984.

== Career ==
He began his career as a lecturer in UNN where he lectured from 1981 to 1998 at the Department of Political Science and Department of Public Administration. He was later secretary of the Academic Staff Union of Universities (ASUU) University of Nigeria, Nsukka Branch. He served Anambra State Government between 1990 and 1996 as Director General Public Utilities and Director General Finance and Commissioner, 1999–2003. In 2003, he became a senator of the Federal Republic of Nigeria and represented Anambra South Senatorial Zone till 2007. In 2021, he was elected as a governorship candidate of a faction of PDP in the Anambra State gubernatorial election. Ugochukwu Uba is also a Knight of the Anglican Communion.

== Others ==
Ugochukwu Uba became chairman Senate, Committee on Transport and later Committee on Marine Transport from 2003 to 2004. During this period, He supported:

- The development of Inland Container Depots ICDs as well as the adoption of a Multi-Modal Transport Document MMT as proposed by UNCITRAL (United Nations Commission for International Trade and Law).
- The facilitation of the passage of contemporary establishment act for the National Maritime Authority NMA (now the Nigerian Maritime Administration and Safety Agency NIMASA) in 2007.
- The facilitation the domestication of several International Maritime Conventions in Nigeria notably, the International Ship and Port Facility Security IPS code and holistic review of the extinct Merchant Shipping Act.

Drawing on his professional experience, he supported reforms in port operations and contributed to the development of guidelines for the Cabotage Act of 2003, which addressed financing mechanisms for Nigerian operators to participate in coastal shipping.
