= Toomas Uba =

Estonian sport journalist

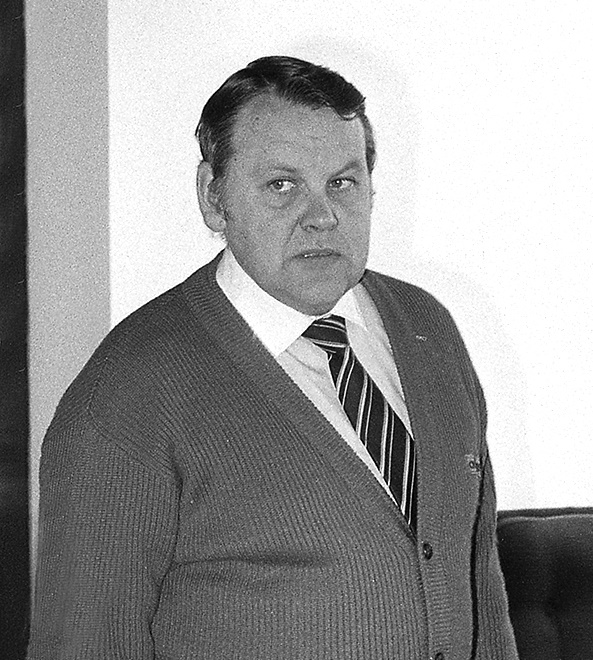
- Toomas Uba in 1989
- Born: 2 November 1943; Tallinn
- Died: 31 December 2000 (aged 57)
- Education: Tartu State University
- Occupation: Sports journalist
- Father: Reginald Uba

Toomas Uba (2 November 1943 – 31 December 2000) was an Estonian sports journalist.

He was born in Tallinn. In 1968, he graduated from Tartu State University with a degree in journalism.

From 1962 until 1972 he worked as a sports reporter for Eesti Raadio. Since 1973 he worked at Eesti Televisioon's (ETV) sport section. Since 1978 he was the chief editor and since 1999 its main producer.

Awards:

- 1988 Merited Journalist of Estonian SSR
- 1998 Valdo Pant's Award
- 1998 annual prize of Cultural Endowment of Estonia
