= Hakob Hakobyan (footballer) =

Armenian footballer

Personal information
- Date of birth: 29 March 1997 (age 29)
- Place of birth: Akhalkalaki, Georgia
- Height: 1.79 m (5 ft 10 in)
- Position: Defensive midfielder

Team information
- Current team: Alashkert

Youth career
- –2013: Banants

Senior career*
Years	Team	Apps	(Gls)
2013–2019	Banants-2	41	(1)
2014–2022	Banants/Urartu	155	(2)
2022–2026	Ararat-Armenia	50	(2)
2024	→ Van (loan)	12	(0)
2026–	Alashkert	0	(0)

International career^{‡}
2013	Armenia U17	3	(0)
2014–2015	Armenia U19	6	(0)
2016–2018	Armenia U21	11	(0)
2020–	Armenia	4	(0)
- * Club domestic league appearances and goals as of 10 December 2025 ‡ National team caps and goals as of 18:14, 16 November 2022 (UTC)

Hakob Hakobyan (Armenian: Հակոբ Հակոբյան; born 29 March 1997) is an Armenian professional footballer who plays as a defensive midfielder for Alashkert and the Armenia national team.

== Club career ==
On 4 July 2022, Urartu announced the departure of Hakobyan, with Ararat-Armenia announcing the signing of Hakobyan on 10 July 2022.

On 11 June 2026, Ararat-Armenia announced that Hakobyan had left the club after his contract had expired, with Alashkert announcing his signature the same day.

== International career ==
Hakobyan made his international debut for Armenia on 18 November 2020 in the UEFA Nations League against North Macedonia.

== Career statistics ==
=== Club ===
As of match played 27 May 2026

Appearances and goals by club, season and competition
Club	Season	League			National cup		Continental		Other		Total	
Club	Season	Division	Apps	Goals	Apps	Goals	Apps	Goals	Apps	Goals	Apps	Goals
Urartu	2013–14	Armenian Premier League	11	0	2	0	–		–		16	0
Urartu	2014–15	Armenian Premier League	1	0	0	0	–		–		1	0
Urartu	2015–16	Armenian Premier League	15	0	5	0	–		–		0	0
Urartu	2016–17	Armenian Premier League	16	0	3	0	2 (Note: Appearances in the UEFA Europa League)	0	1 (Note: Appearances in the Armenian Supercup)	0	22	0
Urartu	2017–18	Armenian Premier League	20	0	3	0	–		–		23	0
Urartu	2018–19	Armenian Premier League	25	0	2	0	0	0	–		27	0
Urartu	2019–20	Armenian Premier League	17	2	3	0	2	0	–		22	2
Urartu	2020–21	Armenian Premier League	21	0	3	0	–		–		24	0
Urartu	2021–22	Armenian Premier League	29	0	2	1	2 (Note: Appearances in the UEFA Europa Conference League/UEFA Conference League)	0	–		33	1
Urartu	Total		155	2	23	1	6	0	1	0	185	3
Ararat-Armenia	2022–23	Armenian Premier League	24	2	1	0	1	0	–		26	2
Ararat-Armenia	2023–24	Armenian Premier League	8	0	1	0	3	0	–		12	0
Ararat-Armenia	2024–25	Armenian Premier League	10	0	1	0	0	0	1	0	12	0
Ararat-Armenia	2025–26	Armenian Premier League	8	0	3	0	0	0	0	0	11	0
Ararat-Armenia	Total		50	2	6	0	4	0	1	0	61	2
Van (loan)	2023–24	Armenian Premier League	12	0	1	0	–		–		13	0
Career total			217	4	30	1	10	0	2	0	259	5

=== International ===
As of match played 16 November 2022

Armenia
Year	Apps	Goals
2020	1	0
2021	2	0
2022	1	0
Total	4	0
