= Uba (given name) =

Uba is a Nigerian given name. Notable people with the name include:

- Uba Charles Nwokoma (born 2002), Nigerian footballer
- Uba Maigari Ahmadu, Nigerian lawyer by profession
- Uba Sani (born 1970), Nigerian engineer and politician

== See also ==
- Uba (surname), Nigerian surname
