= Bohdan Mytsyk =

Ukrainian footballer

Personal information
- Full name: Bohdan Olehovych Mytsyk
- Date of birth: 8 March 1998 (age 28)
- Place of birth: Poltava, Ukraine
- Height: 1.86 m (6 ft 1 in)
- Position: Defender

Team information
- Current team: Broń Radom
- Number: 15

Youth career
- 2011–2012: Vorskla Poltava
- 2013–2015: Metalurh Donetsk

Senior career*
Years	Team	Apps	(Gls)
2015	Metalurh Donetsk	0	(0)
2015–2018	Stal Kamianske	5	(0)
2018	Atlantas Klaipėda	7	(0)
2019	Inhulets Petrove	1	(0)
2020–2021	Codru Lozova	18	(1)
2021–2022	Prykarpattia Ivano-Frankivsk	0	(0)
2022	Alliance	17	(0)
2022–2023	Van	11	(2)
2023	Marijampolė City	6	(0)
2023	Jonava	12	(0)
2024	Legionovia Legionowo	5	(0)
2024–2026	Mazur Karczew	51	(1)
2026–	Broń Radom	5	(0)
- * Club domestic league appearances and goals as of 21:48, 2 September 2026 (UTC)

Bohdan Mytsyk (Ukrainian: Богдан Олегович Мицик; born 8 March 1998) is a Ukrainian professional footballer who plays as a defender for IV liga Masovia club Broń Radom.

== Career ==
Mytsyk is a product of Vorskla Poltava and Metalurh Donetsk youth sportive team systems.

After dissolution of Metalurh in 2015, he was signed by Stal Kamianske and made his debut for the senior team in a win over Zorya Luhansk on 16 July 2017 in the Ukrainian Premier League.

== Honours ==
Mazur Karczew

- V liga Masovia II: 2024–25
