= Shota Gvazava =

Georgian footballer

Personal information
- Date of birth: 26 October 1992 (age 34)
- Place of birth: Georgia
- Height: 1.85 m (6 ft 1 in)
- Position: Midfielder

Team information
- Current team: Kokand 1912
- Number: 7

Senior career*
Years	Team	Apps	(Gls)
2012–2013	STU Tbilisi	25	(5)
2013	Dinamo-2 Tbilisi	2	(0)
2014	STU Tbilisi	13	(2)
2014	Zugdidi	5	(0)
2015	Odishi 1919	17	(4)
2015	Merani Martvili	9	(0)
2016	Odishi 1919	20	(1)
2017	Gagra	22	(0)
2018	Shevardeni-1906 Tbilisi	5	(0)
2019	Vereya	3	(0)
2020	Chikhura Sachkhere	16	(1)
2021	Slutsk	14	(0)
2022–2023	Van	36	(0)
2023	Mash'al Mubarek	9	(0)
2023	MFK Rožňava	1	(0)
2024	Gonio	9	(0)
2024–	Kokand 1912	48	(2)
- * Club domestic league appearances and goals as of 28 July 2026

Shota Gvazava (Georgian: შოთა გვაზავა; born 26 October 1992) is a Georgian professional footballer who plays for Kokand 1912.

== Career ==
On 16 January 2023, Gvazava left Van.

On 11 March 2023, Mash'al Mubarek announced the singing of Gvazava.
