= Artem Bilyi =

Ukrainian footballer (born 1999)

Personal information
- Full name: Artem Kostyantynovych Bilyi
- Date of birth: 3 October 1999 (age 27)
- Place of birth: Novomoskovsk, Ukraine
- Height: 1.82 m (6 ft 0 in)
- Position: Central midfielder

Youth career
- 2009–2011: DYuSSh Novomoskovsk
- 2011–2013: Dnipro Dnipropetrovsk
- 2013–2014: DYuSSh Novomoskovsk
- 2014–2015: Dnipro Dnipropetrovsk
- 2015–2016: DVUFK Dnipropetrovsk

Senior career*
Years	Team	Apps	(Gls)
2016–2017	Zorya Luhansk	0	(0)
2017	Petrykivka	0	(0)
2017	Chornomorets Odesa	0	(0)
2018–2021	Vorskla Poltava	3	(0)
2020–2021	→ VPK-Ahro Shevchenkivka (loan)	9	(0)
2021	Vovchansk	13	(1)
2021–2022	Metalist Kharkiv	3	(0)
2022	Van	16	(2)
2023	Liepāja	0	(0)
2023–2024	Celje	1	(0)
2023–2024	→ Aluminij (loan)	19	(1)
2024	Dainava	13	(1)
- * Club domestic league appearances and goals as of 10 January 2025

Artem Kostyantynovych Bilyi (Ukrainian: Артем Костянтинович Білий; born 3 October 1999) is a Ukrainian professional footballer who plays as a central midfielder.

== Career ==
On 29 December 2022, Van announced that Bilyi had left the club.

On 9 January 2023, Bilyi signed for Liepāja.
