= Danil Ankudinov =

Kazakhstani footballer

Personal information
- Full name: Danil Anatolyevich Ankudinov
- Date of birth: 31 July 2003 (age 23)
- Place of birth: Karagandy, Kazakhstan
- Height: 1.88 m (6 ft 2 in)
- Position: Forward

Team information
- Current team: Ceuta B

Youth career
- Marcet Football University
- Stadium Casablanca

Senior career*
Years	Team	Apps	(Gls)
2021	Rodina-2 Moscow		
2022–2023	Sheriff Tiraspol	7	(0)
2023	→ Van (loan)	17	(4)
2023	→ Džiugas Telšiai (loan)	12	(1)
2024	Dnepr Mogilev	11	(0)
2024–2025	Mensajero	25	(7)
2025–	Ceuta B	10	(4)

International career^{‡}
2019	Kazakhstan U17	3	(0)
2021	Kazakhstan U19	2	(0)
2024	Kazakhstan U21	6	(1)
- * Club domestic league appearances and goals as of 8 November 2025 ‡ National team caps and goals as of 10 October 2024

Danil Anatolyevich Ankudinov (Russian: Данил Анатольевич Анкудинов; born 31 July 2003) is a Kazakh footballer who plays as a forward for Spanish club Ceuta B in the fifth-tier Tercera Federación.

== Career ==
As a youth player, Ankudinov joined the Spanish Marcet Football University. In 2021, he signed for Rodina-2 in the Russian fourth tier. Before the second half of 2021–22, he signed for Moldovan top flight club Sheriff. On 5 March 2022, Ankudinov debuted for Sheriff during a 2–0 win over Sfîntul Gheorghe.

On 22 February 2023, Ankudinov joined Armenian Premier League club Van on loan for the remainder of the season.

== International career ==
Ankudinov represented Kazakhstan at U-17 and U-19 youth levels.
