= Gegham Kadimyan =

Armenian footballer

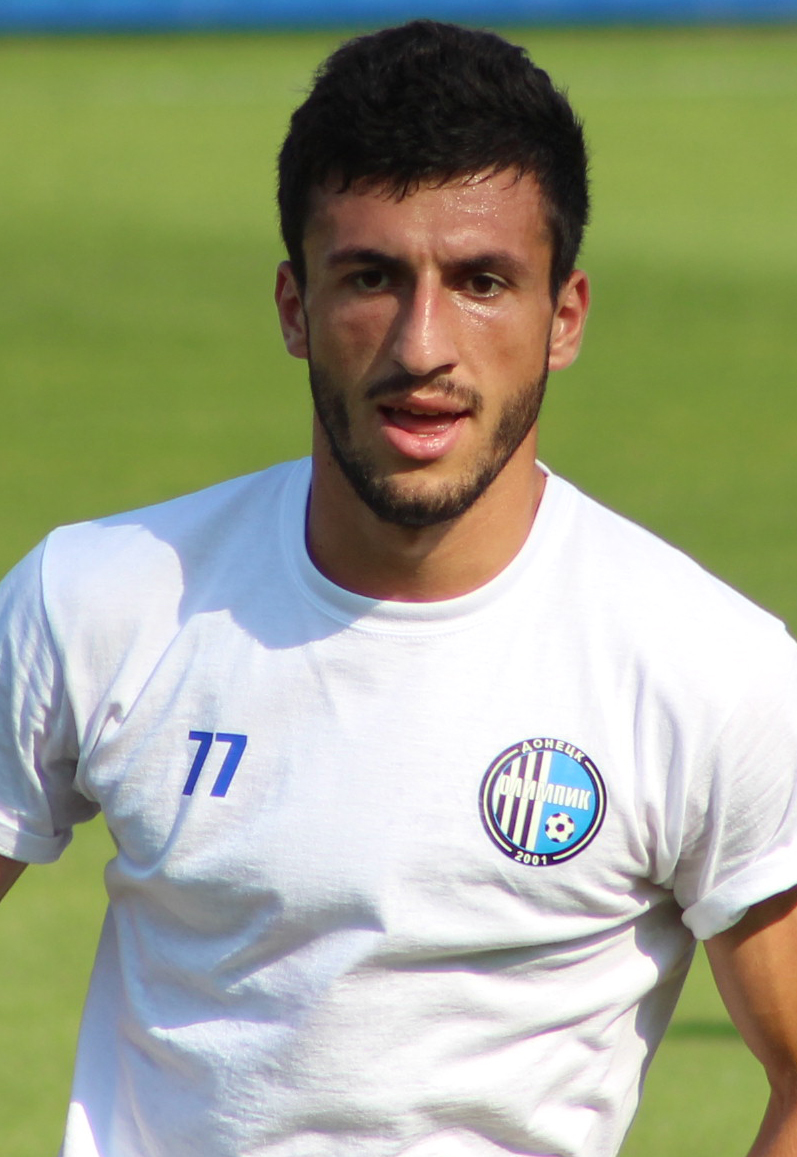

Personal information
- Date of birth: 19 October 1992 (age 34)
- Place of birth: Artashat, Armenia
- Height: 1.83 m (6 ft 0 in)
- Positions: Winger; forward

Youth career
- 1999–2006: Pyunik Yerevan
- 2006–2009: Arsenal Kharkiv

Senior career*
Years	Team	Apps	(Gls)
2009	Arsenal Kharkiv	10	(1)
2009–2013	Tytan Armyansk	58	(3)
2013–2014	Sumy	20	(6)
2014	Hoverla Uzhhorod	1	(0)
2014–2015	Olimpik Donetsk	36	(7)
2016	Karpaty Lviv	15	(0)
2017	Zorya Luhansk	4	(0)
2017–2018	Vorskla Poltava	28	(1)
2019	Arsenal Kyiv	11	(0)
2019	Alashkert	10	(7)
2020	Neman Grodno	29	(12)
2021	Kaisar	22	(0)
2022	Neman Grodno	11	(1)
2023	Van	10	(1)
Total		265	(39)

International career^{‡}
2016–2020	Armenia	15	(2)
- * Club domestic league appearances and goals as of 4 June 2023 ‡ National team caps and goals as of 15 November 2020

Gegham Kadimyan (Armenian: Գեղամ Կադիմյան; born 19 October 1992) is a professional Armenian footballer who plays as a winger or forward.

== Club career ==
Kadimyan is the product of Armenian FC Pyunik Sportive School System where his first trainer was Serzh Sargsyan and FC Arsenal Kharkiv, where he joined in age 14. He spent large part of his career as a player in three clubs of the Ukrainian Second League and the Ukrainian First League.

In January 2014 he signed 2,5 years deal with Ukrainian Premier League's club FC Hoverla Uzhhorod. After one and a half year in Donetsk, he signed for Karpaty Lviv in February 2016. His debut was with an assist against Dynamo Kyiv.

== International career ==
At 23 years old he played his first international FIFA game, representing Armenia against Belarus. The game ended in a goalless draw and Gegham played the last 20 minutes on the left wing.

=== International goals ===
As of match played 1 June 2016. Armenia score listed first, score column indicates score after each Kadimyan goal.

International goals by date, venue, cap, opponent, score, result and competition
No.	Date	Venue	Cap	Opponent	Score	Result	Competition
1	28 May 2016	StubHub Center, Carson, United States	2	Guatemala	3–1	7–1	Friendly
2	1 June 2016	StubHub Center, Carson, United States	3	El Salvador	4–0	4–0	Friendly
