= Daniel Cifuentes =

Colombian footballer (born 1999)

Personal information
- Full name: Juan Daniel Cifuentes Vergara
- Date of birth: 21 April 1999 (age 27)
- Place of birth: Yumbo, Colombia
- Height: 1.80 m (5 ft 11 in)
- Position: Centre-back

Youth career
- América de Cali

Senior career*
Years	Team	Apps	(Gls)
2018–2021	América de Cali	3	(0)
2022–2023	Racing Montevideo	1	(0)
2023	FC Van	15	(1)
2024	Ferro de General Pico	18	(0)
- * Club domestic league appearances and goals as of 19:50, 9 December 2024 (UTC)

Juan Daniel Cifuentes Vergara (born 21 April 1999) is a Colombian footballer who plays as a centre-back.

== Club career ==
=== América de Cali ===
Cifuentes started playing football at the football school, Escuela de Fútbol Carlos Sarmiento Lora, in Candelaria, Valle del Cauca. After leaving the school, Cifuentes wanted to retire from football. However, he was convinces to keep playing and soon after, he started at América de Cali. Cifuentes had formerly played as an attacker and a midfielder, but after joining América, he was moved down to the defence.

19-year old Cifuentes got his official debut on 11 November 2018, when he came in as a substitute for Daniel Buitrago in the 85th minute against La Equidad in the Categoría Primera A. This game was his only appearance in the 2018 season. In the 2019 season, Cifuentes was a regular part of the U-20 team and played no professional games.

In 2020, Cifuentes was noted for two appearances in the Categoría Primera A for América, both in January 2020. He made no further appearances in 2020. In 2021, Cifuentes was not a part of América's first team squad. In March 2022, Cifuentes joined Uruguayan Segunda División side Racing Club de Montevideo.

=== Argentina ===
After a year at Armenian Premier League club FC Van, Cifuentes moved to Argentine Torneo Federal A side Ferro de General Pico in February 2024.
