= Bismark Ubah =

Nigerian footballer

Personal information
- Full name: Bismark Storne Ebuka Ubah
- Date of birth: 5 January 1994 (age 32)
- Place of birth: Nigeria
- Height: 1.85 m (6 ft 1 in)
- Position: Forward

Team information
- Current team: Independiente Petrolero
- Number: 91

Senior career*
Years	Team	Apps	(Gls)
- Enyimba
2016	Tucanes de Amazonas		
2016–2017	Oriente Petrolero		
2018	Real Santa Cruz		
2019	Deportivo FATIC		
2020–2021	Atlético Palmaflor	28	(4)
2021	Real Potosí	19	(5)
2022	Atlético Palmaflor	5	(0)
2023	Van	2	(0)
2023	Wilstermann	11	(1)
2024	Royal Pari	12	(0)
2025–	Independiente Petrolero	13	(3)

International career
- Nigeria U15
- * Club domestic league appearances and goals as of 00:59, 21 December 2025 (UTC)

Bismark Storne Ebuka Ubah (born 5 January 1994) is a Nigerian professional footballer who plays as a forward for Bolivian club Independiente Petrolero. Besides his native Nigeria, he has played in Venezuela, Bolivia and Armenia.

== Career ==
After joining a professional team at the age of 15, Ubah signed for Tucanes de Amazonas in Venezuela, but eventually left due to the crisis there. From there, he signed for Bolivian side Oriente Petrolero, leaving after a change of head coach.

In 2019, he signed for Deportivo FATIC in the Bolivian lower leagues.

In 2020, he signed for Bolivian top flight outfit Club Atlético Palmaflor. In 2021, he signed for Real Potosí.
