= 2022–23 FC Ararat-Armenia season =

Ararat-Armenia
2022–23 season
- Director: Poghos Galstyan
- Manager: Vardan Bichakhchyan
- Stadium: FFA Academy Stadium
- Premier League: 3rd
- Armenian Cup: Quarter Final vs Urartu
- UEFA Europa Conference League: Second qualifying round vs Paide Linnameeskond
- Top goalscorer: League: Wilfried Eza (13); All: Wilfried Eza (16)
| Home colours | Away colours |

The 2022–23 season was FC Ararat-Armenia's 5th season in Armenian Premier League, where they finished the season in third position. Ararat-Armenia also entered the Armenian Cup, reaching the Quarterfinals before being defeated by eventual champions Urartu. In European competition, Ararat-Armenia where knocked out of the 2022–UEFA Europa Conference League by Paide Linnameeskond.

== Season events ==
On 8 June, Ararat-Armenia announced the signing of Gevorg Ghazaryan from Pyunik, with Arman Hovhannisyan joining the following day, also from Pyunik, and Vsevolod Ermakov signing from Ararat Yerevan on 10 June.

On 24 June, Ararat-Armenia announced the signing of Hugo Firmino from Pyunik.

On 1 July, Ararat-Armenia announced that Styopa Mkrtchyan had returned from his loan spell with BKMA Yerevan.

On 4 July, Ararat-Armenia announced the signing of Agdon Menezes from Varzim, whilst Tenton Yenne signed from Noravank on 7 July.

On 10 July, Ararat-Armenia announced the signing of Hakob Hakobyan from Urartu, whilst Miloš Stamenković joined on 14 July from Akzhayik.

On 12 January, Ararat-Armenia announced the signings of Edgar Grigoryan and Taofiq Jibril.

On 16 January, Ararat-Armenia announced that Wbeymar and Agdon had joined Alashkert on loan for the remainder of the season.

On 18 January, Ararat-Armenia announced the signing of Amos Nondi from Dila Gori.

On 19 January, Ararat-Armenia announced that Romércio had left the club after his contract had expired.

On 6 February, Ararat-Armenia announced the signing of Colombian defender Carlos Pérez from Alianza Petrolera.

On 25 February, Ararat-Armenia announced the signing of Croatian defender Dragan Lovrić from Kryvbas Kryvyi Rih.

On 28 February, Styopa Mkrtchyan returned to BKMA Yerevan on loan for the remainder of the season.

On 4 March, Miloš Stamenković left Ararat-Armenia.

== Squad ==
As of match played 5 June 2023

| Number | Name | Nationality | Position | Date of birth (age) | Signed from | Signed in | Contract ends | Apps. | Goals |
Goalkeepers
| 1 | Hayk Khachatryan | (Armenia) | GK | 27 January 2005 (aged 18) | Academy | 2021 | | 0 | 0 |
| 33 | Dmitry Abakumov | (Russia) | GK | 8 July 1989 (aged 33) | Luch Vladivostok | 2018 | | 85 | 0 |
| 45 | Vsevolod Ermakov | (Russia) | GK | 6 January 1996 (aged 27) | Ararat Yerevan | 2022 | | 39 | 0 |
Defenders
| 2 | Alemão | (Brazil) | DF | 7 December 1992 (aged 30) | Oliveirense | 2020 | | 82 | 6 |
| 3 | Junior Bueno | (Colombia) | DF | 3 September 1996 (aged 26) | Once Caldas | 2021 | | 62 | 1 |
| 5 | Davit Terteryan | (Armenia) | DF | 17 December 1997 (aged 25) | Gandzasar Kapan | 2021 | | 64 | 1 |
| 16 | Edgar Grigoryan | (Armenia) | DF | 25 August 1998 (aged 24) | Unattached | 2023 | | 9 | 0 |
| 25 | Dragan Lovrić | (Croatia) | DF | 3 January 1996 (aged 27) | Kryvbas Kryvyi Rih | 2023 | | 9 | 0 |
| 32 | Carlos Pérez | (Colombia) | DF | 15 June 1995 (aged 27) | Alianza Petrolera | 2023 | | 8 | 1 |
Midfielders
| 8 | Gevorg Ghazaryan | (Armenia) | MF | 5 April 1988 (aged 35) | Pyunik | 2022 | | 21 | 2 |
| 10 | Armen Ambartsumyan | (Russia) | MF | 11 April 1994 (aged 29) | Fakel Voronezh | 2018 | | 141 | 8 |
| 11 | Jonathan Duarte | (Colombia) | MF | 25 May 1997 (aged 26) | Orsomarso | 2022 | | 38 | 7 |
| 12 | Amos Nondi | (Kenya) | MF | 10 February 1999 (aged 24) | Dila Gori | 2023 | | 14 | 1 |
| 14 | Mailson Lima | (Cape Verde) | MF | 29 May 1994 (aged 29) | Dibba Al-Hisn | 2021 | | 125 | 41 |
| 19 | Karen Muradyan | (Armenia) | MF | 11 November 1992 (aged 30) | Ararat Yerevan | 2021 | | 66 | 0 |
| 20 | Alwyn Tera | (Kenya) | MF | 18 January 1997 (aged 26) | Saburtalo Tbilisi | 2021 | | 61 | 2 |
| 21 | Solomon Udo | (Armenia) | MF | 15 July 1995 (aged 27) | Shakhter Karagandy | 2022 | | 40 | 0 |
| 34 | Erik Smbatyan | (Armenia) | MF | 10 February 2003 (aged 20) | Academy | 2022 | | 1 | 0 |
| 36 | Michel Ayvazyan | (Armenia) | MF | 21 June 2005 (aged 17) | Academy | 2022 | | 1 | 0 |
| 55 | Hakob Hakobyan | (Armenia) | MF | 29 March 1997 (aged 26) | Urartu | 2022 | | 26 | 2 |
Forwards
| 7 | Hugo Firmino | (Portugal) | FW | 22 December 1988 (aged 34) | Pyunik | 2022 | | 27 | 9 |
| 9 | Artur Serobyan | (Armenia) | FW | 2 July 2003 (aged 19) | Academy | 2020 | | 31 | 5 |
| 15 | Tenton Yenne | (Nigeria) | FW | 7 July 2000 (aged 22) | Noravank | 2022 | | 37 | 10 |
| 17 | Hilary Gong | (Nigeria) | FW | 10 October 1998 (aged 24) | on loan from GBS Academy | 2023 | | 10 | 0 |
| 18 | Artyom Avanesyan | (Armenia) | FW | 17 July 1999 (aged 23) | Ararat Moscow | 2018 | | 88 | 11 |
| 27 | Taofiq Jibril | (Nigeria) | FW | 23 April 1998 (aged 25) | MŠK Žilina | 2023 | | 15 | 4 |
| 29 | Jesse Akila | (Nigeria) | FW | 27 December 2001 (aged 21) | Plateau United | 2022 | | 17 | 1 |
| 88 | Wilfried Eza | (Ivory Coast) | FW | 28 December 1996 (aged 26) | Van | 2021 | | 69 | 24 |
Away on loan
| 6 | Wbeymar | (Armenia) | MF | 6 March 1992 (aged 31) | Gandzasar Kapan | 2020 | | 52 | 1 |
| 9 | Agdon Menezes | (Brazil) | FW | 26 January 1993 (aged 30) | Varzim | 2022 | | 15 | 4 |
| 23 | Styopa Mkrtchyan | (Armenia) | DF | 17 February 2003 (aged 20) | Academy | 2020 | | 10 | 0 |
| | Albert Khachumyan | (Armenia) | DF | 23 June 1999 (aged 23) | Academy | 2017 | | 62 | 4 |
| | Narek Alaverdyan | (Armenia) | MF | 19 February 2002 (aged 21) | Youth Team | 2019 | | 2 | 0 |
| | Zhirayr Shaghoyan | (Armenia) | MF | 10 April 2001 (aged 22) | Academy | 2017 | | 64 | 11 |
Left during the season
| 4 | Arman Hovhannisyan | (Armenia) | DF | 7 July 1993 (aged 29) | Pyunik | 2022 | | 17 | 0 |
| 22 | Miloš Stamenković | (Serbia) | DF | 1 June 1990 (aged 33) | Akzhayik | 2022 | | 5 | 0 |
| 30 | Romércio | (Brazil) | DF | 25 February 1997 (aged 26) | Remo | 2022 | | 31 | 3 |

=== Out on loan ===
Note: Flags indicate national team as defined under FIFA eligibility rules; some limited exceptions apply. Players may hold more than one non-FIFA nationality.

| No. | Pos. | Nation | Player |
|---|---|---|---|
| — | DF | ARM | Albert Khachumyan (at BKMA Yerevan) |
| — | DF | ARM | Styopa Mkrtchyan (at BKMA Yerevan) |
| — | MF | ARM | Zhirayr Shaghoyan (at CSKA Sofia) |
| — | MF | ARM | Wbeymar (at Alashkert) |
| — | FW | ARM | Misak Hakobyan (at BKMA Yerevan) |
| — | FW | BRA | Agdon (at Alashkert) |

== Transfers ==
=== In ===
| Date | Position | Nationality | Name | From | Fee | Ref. |
|---|---|---|---|---|---|---|
| 8 June 2022 | MF | (Armenia) | Gevorg Ghazaryan | Pyunik | Undisclosed | |
| 9 June 2022 | DF | (Armenia) | Arman Hovhannisyan | Pyunik | Undisclosed | |
| 10 June 2022 | GK | (Russia) | Vsevolod Ermakov | Ararat Yerevan | Undisclosed | |
| 24 June 2022 | FW | (Portugal) | Hugo Firmino | Pyunik | Undisclosed | |
| 4 July 2022 | FW | (Brazil) | Agdon Menezes | Varzim | Undisclosed | |
| 7 July 2022 | FW | (Nigeria) | Tenton Yenne | Noravank | Undisclosed | |
| 10 July 2022 | MF | (Armenia) | Hakob Hakobyan | Urartu | Undisclosed | |
| 14 July 2022 | DF | (Serbia) | Miloš Stamenković | Akzhayik | Undisclosed | |
| 15 October 2022 | FW | (Nigeria) | Jesse Akila | Plateau United | Undisclosed | |
| 12 January 2023 | DF | (Armenia) | Edgar Grigoryan | Unattached | Free | |
| 12 January 2023 | FW | (Nigeria) | Taofiq Jibril | MŠK Žilina | Undisclosed | |
| 18 January 2023 | MF | (Kenya) | Amos Nondi | Dila Gori | Undisclosed | |
| 6 February 2023 | DF | (Colombia) | Carlos Pérez | Alianza Petrolera | Undisclosed | |
| 25 February 2023 | DF | (Croatia) | Dragan Lovrić | Kryvbas Kryvyi Rih | Undisclosed | |

=== Loans in ===
| Date from | Position | Nationality | Name | To | Date to | Ref. |
|---|---|---|---|---|---|---|
| 27 February 2023 | FW | (Nigeria) | Hilary Gong | GBS Academy | 15 July 2023 | |

=== Out ===
| Date | Position | Nationality | Name | To | Fee | Ref. |
|---|---|---|---|---|---|---|
| 19 February 2023 | DF | (Armenia) | Arman Hovhannisyan | Ararat Yerevan | Undisclosed | |

=== Loans out ===
| Date from | Position | Nationality | Name | To | Date to | Ref. |
|---|---|---|---|---|---|---|
| 26 July 2020 | MF | (Armenia) | Narek Alaverdyan | BKMA Yerevan | Undisclosed | |
| 23 August 2021 | FW | (Armenia) | Artur Serobyan | BKMA Yerevan | 27 February 2023 | |
| 20 January 2022 | DF | (Armenia) | Albert Khachumyan | BKMA Yerevan | End of season | |
| 29 June 2022 | MF | (Armenia) | Patvakan Avetisyan | Noah | End of season | |
| 19 July 2022 | DF | (Armenia) | Ruben Hovsepyan | Noah | End of season | |
| 29 July 2022 | MF | (Armenia) | Zhirayr Shaghoyan | BKMA Yerevan | 5 September 2022 | |
| 6 September 2022 | MF | (Armenia) | Zhirayr Shaghoyan | CSKA Sofia | | |
| 16 January 2023 | MF | (Armenia) | Wbeymar | Alashkert | 30 June 2023 | |
| 16 January 2023 | FW | (Brazil) | Agdon | Alashkert | 30 June 2023 | |
| 28 February 2023 | DF | (Armenia) | Styopa Mkrtchyan | BKMA Yerevan | 30 June 2023 | |

=== Released ===
| Date | Position | Nationality | Name | Joined | Date | Ref |
|---|---|---|---|---|---|---|
| 19 January 2023 | DF | (Brazil) | Romércio | São Bernardo | | |
| 4 March 2023 | DF | (Serbia) | Miloš Stamenković | Kuban Krasnodar | 16 March 2023 | |

== Friendlies ==
| 23 June 2022 | Ararat-Armenia | 3–0 | Ararat Yerevan |
| (UTC+4) | Muradyan; Ambartsumyan; Lima | Report |

| 30 June 2022 | Alashkert | 0–2 | Ararat-Armenia |
| (UTC+4) | | Report | Avanesyan; Eza |

| 6 July 2022 | Ararat-Armenia | 8–2 | Van |
| (UTC+4) | | Report |

| 13 July 2022 | Torpedo Kutaisi (Georgia (country)) | 0–2 | Ararat-Armenia |
| (UTC+4) | | Report | Firmino 40', 73' |

| 21 January 2023 | Ararat-Armenia | 0–1 | BKMA Yerevan | Yerevan |
| 12:00 (UTC+4) | | Report | G.Tarakhchyan | Stadium: FFA Stadium |

| 28 January 2023 | Ararat-Armenia | 1–0 | Shirak | Yerevan |
| 12:15 (UTC+4) | Goal | Report | | Stadium: FFA Stadium |

| 5 February 2023 | Ural Yekaterinburg (Russia) | 1–1 | Ararat-Armenia | United Arab Emirates |
| 17:00 (UTC+4) | Begić 56' | Report | 62' |

| 10 February 2023 | Zenit St.Petersburg (Russia) | 1–1 | Ararat-Armenia | United Arab Emirates |
| 17:00 (UTC+4) | Cassierra 57' | Report | Akila 78' |

| 13 February 2023 | Emirates Club (United Arab Emirates) | 0–1 | Ararat-Armenia | United Arab Emirates |
| 17:00 (UTC+4) | | Report | Goal |

| 18 February 2023 | Rostov (Russia) | 3–0 | Ararat-Armenia | United Arab Emirates |
| 11:00 (UTC+4) | | Report |

| 18 February 2023 | Ural Yekaterinburg (Russia) | 2–0 | Ararat-Armenia | United Arab Emirates |
| (UTC+4) | | Report |

== Competitions ==
=== Overall record ===
| Competition | First match | Last match | Starting round | Final position | Record | | | | | | | |
| Competition | First match | Last match | Starting round | Final position | Pld | W | D | L | GF | GA | GD | Win % |
|---|---|---|---|---|---|---|---|---|---|---|---|---|
| Premier League | 31 July 2022 | 5 June 2023 | Matchday 1 | 3rd | 36 | 23 | 7 | 6 | 70 | 27 | +43 | 63.89 |
| Armenian Cup | 4 October 2022 | 26 November 2022 | First round | Quarter Final | 2 | 1 | 0 | 1 | 4 | 4 | +0 | 50.00 |
| UEFA Europa Conference League | 21 July 2022 | 28 July 2022 | Second qualifying round | Second qualifying round | 2 | 0 | 2 | 0 | 0 | 0 | +0 | 0.00 |
| Total | | | | | 40 | 24 | 9 | 7 | 74 | 31 | +43 | 60.00 |

Last updated: 5 June 2023
Source: Competitions

=== Premier League ===
==== Results summary ====
| Overall | | | | | | | | Home | | | | | | Away | | | | | |
| Pld | W | D | L | GF | GA | GD | Pts | W | D | L | GF | GA | GD | W | D | L | GF | GA | GD |
|---|---|---|---|---|---|---|---|---|---|---|---|---|---|---|---|---|---|---|---|
| 36 | 23 | 7 | 6 | 70 | 27 | +43 | 76 | 12 | 4 | 2 | 33 | 10 | +23 | 11 | 3 | 4 | 37 | 17 | +20 |

Last updated: 5 June 2023.
Source: See Results

==== Results by round ====
| Round | 1 | 2 | 3 | 4 | 5 | 6 | 7 | 8 | 9 | 10 | 11 | 12 | 13 | 14 | 15 | 16 | 17 | 18 | 19 | 20 | 21 | 22 | 23 | 24 | 25 | 26 | 27 | 28 | 29 | 30 | 31 | 32 | 33 | 34 | 35 | 36 |
|---|---|---|---|---|---|---|---|---|---|---|---|---|---|---|---|---|---|---|---|---|---|---|---|---|---|---|---|---|---|---|---|---|---|---|---|---|
| Ground | A | A (Note: matchday 3) | A (Note: matchday 4) | H (Note: matchday 5) | A (Note: matchday 6) | H (Note: matchday 7) | A (Note: matchday 8) | H (Note: matchday 9) | H (Note: matchday 10) | A (Note: matchday 11) | A (Note: matchday 12) | H (Note: matchday 13) | A (Note: matchday 14) | H (Note: matchday 15) | H (Note: matchday 2) | A | A (Note: matchday 18) | A (Note: matchday 19) | H (Note: matchday 20) | H (Note: matchday 17) | A | A | H | A | H | A | H | H | A | H | H | A | H | A | H | A |
| Result | L | W | D | W | W | W | W | W | L | L | W | W | W | W | D | W | D | W | D | W | W | D | W | W | W | W | W | D | L | W | L | W | W | L | D | W |
| Position | 9 | 4 | 4 | 4 | 2 | 2 | 2 | 2 | 3 | 3 | 3 | 3 | 3 | 3 | 3 | 2 | 2 | 2 | 2 | 2 | 2 | 2 | 2 | 2 | 2 | 2 | 2 | 2 | 3 | 3 | 3 | 3 | 3 | 3 | 3 | 3 |

Updated to match(es) played on 5 June 2023. Source: See Results
A = Away; H = Home; W = Win; D = Draw; L = Loss; P = Postponed; V = Void

==== Results ====
| 31 July 2022 1 | Urartu | 1–0 | Ararat-Armenia | Yerevan |
| 20:30 (UTC+4) | Polyakov 59'; Everson (yellow card) 82' | Report | Ambartsumyan (yellow card) 37'; Lima (yellow card) 53' | Stadium: Urartu Stadium; Referee: Artem Gasparyan |

| 11 August 2022 3 | Ararat Yerevan | 0–2 | Ararat-Armenia | Yerevan |
| 20:00 (UTC+4) | Mkoyan (yellow card) 12' | Report | Firmino 11'; Yenne 39'; Hakobyan (yellow card) 54' | Stadium: Republican Stadium; Referee: Henrik Nalbandian |

| 19 August 2022 4 | Alashkert | 1–1 | Ararat-Armenia | Yerevan |
| 17:00 (UTC+4) | Mensah 52'; Díaz (yellow card) 76'; Gome (yellow card) 83'; Yedigaryan (yellow card) 88' | Report | Alemão 34'; Tera (yellow card) 45+4'; Hovhannisyan (yellow card) 46' | Stadium: Alashkert Stadium; Referee: Artem Gasparyan |

| 28 August 2022 5 | Ararat-Armenia | 3–0 | Shirak | Yerevan |
| 18:00 (UTC+4) | Duarte (yellow card) 27'; Firmino 35'; Agdon 55'; Hakobyan (yellow card) 80'; Avanesyan 88' | Report | Doumbia (yellow card) 64' | Stadium: FFA Stadium; Referee: Zaven Hovhannisyan |

| 2 September 2022 6 | Van | 0–4 | Ararat-Armenia | Charentsavan |
| 17:00 (UTC+4) | | Report | Duarte 33', 73'; Yenne (yellow card) 53'; Eza 60', 62' | Stadium: Charentsavan City Stadium; Referee: Mesrop Ghazaryan |

| 9 September 2022 7 | Ararat-Armenia | 3–0 | Noah | Yerevan |
| 18:00 (UTC+4) | Agdon 18'; Udo (yellow card) 37'; Romércio 63'; Firmino 72' | Report | | Stadium: FFA Stadium; Referee: Henrik Nalbandian |

| 17 September 2022 8 | Lernayin Artsakh | 0–1 | Ararat-Armenia | Vayk |
| 16:00 (UTC+4) | Kharatyan (yellow card) 66'; Asryan (yellow card) 82' | Report | Yenne 48'; Duarte (yellow card) 90+1'; Eza (yellow card) 90+4'; Ambartsumyan (yellow card) 90+5' | Stadium: Arevik Stadium; Referee: Yura Mahtesyan |

| 30 September 2022 9 | Ararat-Armenia | 1–0 | BKMA Yerevan | Yerevan |
| 16:00 (UTC+4) | Lima 8'; Hovhannisyan (yellow card) 33' | Report | Petrosyan (yellow card) 33'; Alaverdyan (yellow card) 84'; Khamoyan (yellow card) 89' | Stadium: FFA Stadium; Referee: Zaven Hovhannisyan |

| 9 October 2022 10 | Ararat-Armenia | 0–1 | Urartu | Yerevan |
| 16:00 (UTC+4) | Tera (yellow card) 31'; S.Mkrtchyan (yellow card) 45+1'; Lima (yellow card) 56'; Wbeymar (yellow card) 70'; Muradyan (yellow card) 88' | Report | N.Grigoryan (yellow card) 27'; Antwi (red card) 34'; Aghasaryan (yellow card) 40'; Sabua 45+1' (pen.); Polyakov (yellow card) 54'; Melikhov (yellow card) 81'; Tsymbalyuk (yellow card) 90+4' | Stadium: FFA Stadium; Referee: Henrik Nalbandian |

| 17 October 2022 11 | Pyunik | 2–1 | Ararat-Armenia | Yerevan |
| 19:00 (UTC+4) | Otubanjo 9' (yellow card) 26'; Harutyunyan 61'; González (yellow card) 81' | Report | Eza 29'; Avanesyan (yellow card) 50'; Bueno (yellow card) 90+1' | Stadium: Republican Stadium; Referee: Zaven Hovhannisyan |

| 21 October 2022 12 | Ararat-Armenia | 2–1 | Ararat Yerevan | Yerevan |
| 18:00 (UTC+4) | Eza 34'; Muradyan (yellow card) 40'; Yenne 89' | Report | R.Mkrtchyan 42'; A.Mkrtchyan (yellow card) 68'; Potapov (yellow card) 75'; Arzoyan (yellow card) 90+2' | Stadium: FFA Stadium; Referee: Vardan Manukyan |

| 26 October 2022 13 | Ararat-Armenia | 4–1 | Alashkert | Yerevan |
| 17:00 (UTC+4) | Yenne 29'; Eza 35'; Ambartsumyan 63'; Firmino 81' (yellow card) 90'; Hakobyan (yellow card) 86' | Report | Mensah (yellow card) 51'; Díaz 66' | Stadium: FFA Stadium; Referee: Ashot Ghaltakhchyan |

| 30 October 2022 14 | Shirak | 0–5 | Ararat-Armenia | Gyumri |
| 15:00 (UTC+4) | D.Kodia (yellow card) 42' | Report | Firmino 1', 47' (yellow card) 51'; Yenne 3'; Muradyan (yellow card) 26'; Ambartsumyan 53'; Duarte (yellow card) 79'; Akila 90+1' | Stadium: Gyumri City Stadium; Referee: Artem Gasparyan |

| 3 November 2022 15 | Ararat-Armenia | 4–0 | Van | Yerevan |
| 16:00 (UTC+4) | Yenne 17'; Firmino 20', 86'; Lima 90+1' | Report | Mytsyk (yellow card) 35' | Stadium: FFA Stadium; Referee: Ashot Ghaltakhchyan |

| 10 November 2022 2 | Ararat-Armenia | 0–0 | Pyunik | Yerevan |
| 17:00 (UTC+4) | Romércio (yellow card) 40'; Duarte (yellow card) 57'; Firmino (yellow card) 60'; Ghazaryan (yellow card) 90+4' | Report | Baranov (yellow card) 65'; Harutyunyan (yellow card) 71'; Kovalenko (yellow card) 71'; Bratkov (yellow card) 90+3' | Stadium: FFA Stadium; Referee: Henrik Nalbandian |

| 13 November 2022 16 | Noah | 1–2 | Ararat-Armenia | Armavir |
| 14:00 (UTC+4) | Salou 29'; Baghramyan (yellow card) 49'; Avetisyan (yellow card) 88'; Friday (yellow card) 90' | Report | Firmino 17'; Yenne 28'; Tera (yellow card) 62' | Stadium: Armavir City Stadium; Referee: Artem Gasparyan |

| 22 November 2022 18 | BKMA Yerevan | 2–2 | Ararat-Armenia | Yerevan |
| 16:00 (UTC+4) | Lulukyan 18'; Serobyan 21'; Simonyan (yellow card) 90+3' | Report | Eza 79'; Terteryan (yellow card) 85'; Agdon 86' | Stadium: FFA Stadium; Referee: Yura Mahtesyan |

| 30 November 2022 19 | Urartu | 0–3 | Ararat-Armenia | Yerevan |
| 19:00 (UTC+4) | Iwu (yellow card) 17'; Khlyobas (yellow card) 37' | Report | Eza 13', 42'; Muradyan (yellow card) 25'; Bueno (yellow card) 31'; Duarte 57'; Ermakov (yellow card) 64'; Udo (yellow card) 75'; Agdon (yellow card) 85' | Stadium: Urartu Stadium; Referee: Henrik Nalbandyan |

| 5 December 2022 20 | Ararat-Armenia | 1–1 | Pyunik | Yerevan |
| 19:00 (UTC+4) | Eza 83'; Bueno (yellow card) 84'; Firmino (yellow card) 90' | Report | Juričić 21'; Dashyan (yellow card) 31'; Miljković (yellow card) 56'; Harutyunyan (yellow card) 64'; Buchnev (yellow card) 81' | Stadium: FFA Stadium; Referee: Artem Gasparyan |

| 9 December 2022 17 | Ararat-Armenia | 1–0 | Lernayin Artsakh | Yerevan |
| 16:00 (UTC+4) | Duarte (yellow card) 19'; Firmino (yellow card) 50'; Udo (red card) 67'; Romércio 76'; Alemão (yellow card) 90+2' | Report | Poghosyan (yellow card) 50'; Ojetunde (yellow card) 88' | Stadium: FFA Stadium; Referee: Ashot Ghaltakhchyan |

| 27 February 2023 21 | Ararat Yerevan | 1–3 | Ararat-Armenia | Charentsavan |
| 15:00 (UTC+4) | Mijić 29'; Babaliev (yellow card) 75' | Report | Pérez 31'; Alemão 37'; Grigoryan (yellow card) 65'; Jibril 78' | Stadium: Charentsavan City Stadium; Referee: Artem Gasparyan |
Note: Match played at the Charentsavan City Stadium, Charentsavan, instead of Ararat Yerevan's regular Republican Stadium in Yerevan.

| 5 March 2023 22 | Alashkert | 0–0 | Ararat-Armenia | Yerevan |
| 16:00 (UTC+4) | Racines (yellow card) 44'; Carrillo (yellow card) 90+2' | Report | Nondi (yellow card) 45+4'; Ambartsumyan (yellow card) 90' | Stadium: Alashkert Stadium; Referee: Zaven Hovhannisyan |

| 12 March 2023 23 | Ararat-Armenia | 1–0 | Shirak | Yerevan |
| 15:00 (UTC+4) | Pérez (yellow card) 15' (yellow-red card) 90+5'; Serobyan (yellow card) 20'; Akila (yellow card) 72'; Vidić 78' (o.g.); Bueno (yellow card) 90+1' | Report | Kodia (yellow card) 6' (yellow-red card) 48'; Doumbia (yellow card) 39'; Sadoyan (yellow card) 86'; Hakobyan (yellow card) 88'; Mikaelyan (red card) 90+5' | Stadium: FFA Stadium; Referee: Henrik Nalbandian |

| 17 March 2023 24 | Van | 1–2 | Ararat-Armenia | Charentsavan |
| 15:00 (UTC+4) | Najaryan (yellow card) 45'; Gorelov 53'; Manucharyan (yellow card) 76'; Cifuentes (yellow card) 90+8' (red card) 90+8' | Report | Serobyan (yellow card) 35'; Ambartsumyan (yellow card) 56'; Hakobyan (yellow card) 75'; Alemão 89' (pen.), 90+9' (pen.) | Stadium: Charentsavan City Stadium; Referee: Vardan Manukyan |

| 2 April 2023 25 | Ararat-Armenia | 3–0 | Noah | Yerevan |
| 19:00 (UTC+4) | Eza 13', 41'; Serobyan 59'; Nondi (yellow card) 61' | Report | | Stadium: FFA Stadium; Referee: Artem Gasparyan |

| 10 April 2023 26 | Lernayin Artsakh | 0–2 | Ararat-Armenia | Vayk |
| 16:00 (UTC+4) | Kostandyan (yellow card) 54' | Report | Muradyan (yellow card) 26'; Alemão 54' (pen.); Jibril 79'; Akila (yellow card) 90+2' | Stadium: Arevik Stadium; Referee: Vardan Manukyan |

| 15 April 2023 27 | Ararat-Armenia | 2–1 | BKMA Yerevan | Yerevan |
| 16:00 (UTC+4) | Yenne 29'; Simonyan 45' (o.g.); Alemão (yellow card) 75'; Udo (yellow card) 83' | Report | Abrahamyan 21'; Khamoyan (yellow card) 33' | Stadium: FFA Stadium; Referee: Zaven Hovhannisyan |

| 22 April 2023 28 | Ararat-Armenia | 2–2 | Urartu | Yerevan |
| 18:00 (UTC+4) | Serobyan 32'; Nondi (yellow card) 37'; Yenne 69'; Ambartsumyan (yellow card) 77'; Avanesyan (yellow card) 82'; Grigoryan (yellow card) 88'; Ermakov (yellow card) 90+4' | Report | Margaryan (yellow card) 30'; Sabua (yellow card) 56'; Paramonov (yellow card) 59'; Özbiliz 86'; Grigoryan 90+4' | Stadium: FFA Stadium; Referee: Henrik Nalbandian |

| 27 April 2023 29 | Pyunik | 4–1 | Ararat-Armenia | Yerevan |
| 20:00 (UTC+4) | Harutyunyan (yellow card) 25'; Malakyan (yellow card) 39'; Juričić 62', 90+4', 90+6' (yellow card) 88'; Dashyan 73'; Bravo (yellow card) 90+1' | Report | Tera (yellow card) 18'; Muradyan (yellow card) 33'; Serobyan 42' (pen.); Ermakov (yellow card) 88'; Terteryan (yellow card) 88' | Stadium: Republican Stadium; Referee: Artem Gasparyan |

| 3 May 2023 30 | Ararat-Armenia | 2–1 | Ararat Yerevan | Yerevan |
| 19:00 (UTC+4) | Ambartsumyan 33'; Jibril 51'; Terteryan (yellow card) 64'; Ghazaryan (yellow card) 90+3' | Report | Mkrtchyan (yellow card) 40'; Ransom 45'; Dagrou (yellow card) 77'; Mézague (yellow card) 82'; Faye (yellow card) 83' | Stadium: FFA Stadium; Referee: Zaven Hovhannisyan |

| 10 May 2023 31 | Ararat-Armenia | 0–1 | Alashkert | Yerevan |
| 19:00 (UTC+4) | Nondi (yellow card) 26'; Terteryan (yellow card) 32'; Serobyan (yellow card) 34'; Yenne (yellow card) 69'; Tera (yellow card) 73'; Ambartsumyan (yellow card) 86'; Lima (yellow card) 90+6' | Report | Shahinyan (yellow card) 21'; Racines 70'; Čančarević (yellow card) 90+3' | Stadium: FFA Stadium; Referee: Henrik Nalbandian |

| 17 May 2023 32 | Shirak | 0–2 | Ararat-Armenia | Gyumri |
| 20:00 (UTC+4) | Kodia (yellow card) 48' | Report | Eza 21'; Nondi (yellow card) 31'; Ambartsumyan (yellow card) 35'; Yenne (yellow card) 64'; Ghazaryan 90+1' | Stadium: Gyumri City Stadium; Referee: Yura Mahtesyan |

| 22 May 2023 33 | Ararat-Armenia | 4–1 | Van | Yerevan |
| 16:45 (UTC+4) | Eza 26'; Serobyan 53'; Hakobyan 57' (yellow card) 84'; Jibril 66' | Report | Ankudinov 15'; Cifuentes (yellow card) 84'; Hovsepyan (yellow card) 87' | Stadium: FFA Stadium; Referee: Vardan Manukyan |

| 27 May 2023 34 | Noah | 2–1 | Ararat-Armenia | Abovyan |
| 20:00 (UTC+4) | Vardanyan 23'; Danielyan (yellow card) 24'; Muradyan (yellow card) 33'; Igbokwe 67'; Balbarau (yellow card) 90+3'; Ebenezer (yellow card) 90+7'; Melkonyan (yellow card) 90+7' | Report | Nondi (yellow card) 17'; Serobyan 30' (pen.); Grigoryan (yellow card) 70' | Stadium: Abovyan City Stadium; Referee: Ashot Ghaltakhchyan |

| 1 June 2023 35 | Ararat-Armenia | 0–0 | Lernayin Artsakh | Yerevan |
| 18:00 (UTC+4) | Lovrić (yellow card) 32'; Serobyan (yellow card) 63'; Ghazaryan (yellow card) 81'; Eza (yellow card) 90+2'; Terteryan (yellow card) 90+5' | Report | Poghosyan (yellow card) 35'; Jnohope (yellow card) 35'; Harutyunyan (yellow card) 85'; Diaz (yellow card) 90+3' | Stadium: FFA Stadium; Referee: Artem Gasparyan |

| 5 June 2023 36 | BKMA Yerevan | 2–5 | Ararat-Armenia | Yerevan |
| 19:00 (UTC+4) | Khachumyan (yellow card) 30'; Avanesyan 36' (o.g.); Eloyan 58' | Report | Nondi 31' (pen.); Yenne 41' (pen.); Hakobyan 45+2'; Tera 47'; Lovrić (yellow card) 50'; Ghazaryan 75' | Stadium: FFA Stadium; Referee: Henrik Nalbandian |

==== Table ====
| Pos | Team | Pld | W | D | L | GF | GA | GD | Pts | Qualification or relegation |
|---|---|---|---|---|---|---|---|---|---|---|
| 1 | Urartu (C) | 36 | 26 | 5 | 5 | 68 | 25 | +43 | 83 | Qualification for the Champions League first qualifying round |
| 2 | Pyunik | 36 | 25 | 5 | 6 | 72 | 23 | +49 | 80 | Qualification for the Europa Conference League first qualifying round (Note: The 2022–23 Armenian Cup winners qualified for the Europa Conference League first qualifying round. Since the cup winners (Urartu) qualified based on league position, the Europa Conference League spot was passed to the fourth-placed team.) |
| 3 | Ararat-Armenia | 36 | 23 | 7 | 6 | 70 | 27 | +43 | 76 | Qualification for the Europa Conference League first qualifying round |
| 4 | Alashkert | 36 | 20 | 6 | 10 | 58 | 37 | +21 | 66 | Qualification for the Europa Conference League first qualifying round |
| 5 | Van | 36 | 11 | 7 | 18 | 38 | 59 | −21 | 40 | |
| 6 | Ararat Yerevan | 36 | 10 | 8 | 18 | 29 | 42 | −13 | 38 | |
| 7 | Shirak | 36 | 10 | 6 | 20 | 25 | 55 | −30 | 36 | |
| 8 | Noah | 36 | 8 | 8 | 20 | 34 | 66 | −32 | 32 (Note: Games won: Noah 8, BKMA 7.) | |
| 9 | BKMA | 36 | 7 | 11 | 18 | 36 | 53 | −17 | 32 | |
| 10 | Lernayin Artsakh (R) | 36 | 5 | 7 | 24 | 16 | 59 | −43 | 22 | Relegation to the Armenian First League |

Source: FFA Soccerway
Rules for classification: 1) Points; 2) Head-to-head points; 3) Head-to-head goal difference; 4) Head-to-head goals scored; 5) Matches won; 6) Goal difference; 7) Less red cards; 8) Less yellow cards; 9) Fair-play ranking 10) Draw
(C) Champions; (R) Relegated

=== Armenian Cup ===
| 4 October 2022 First round | Ararat Yerevan | 0–4 | Ararat-Armenia | Armavir |
| 15:00 (UTC+4) | Mkoyan (yellow card) 36' | Report | Eza 31', 54', 83'; Mkrtchyan (yellow card) 49'; Agdon 89' | Stadium: Armavir City Stadium; Referee: Davit Mkrtchyan |

| 26 November 2022 Quarterfinal | Ararat-Armenia | 0–4 | Urartu | Yerevan |
| 17:00 (UTC+4) | Lima (yellow card) 82'; Alemão (yellow card) 90+5' | Report | Mayrovich 10'; Beglaryan (yellow card) 74'; Khurtsidze 75'; Aghasaryan (yellow card) 77'; Khlyobas 87'; N.Grigoryan 89' | Stadium: FFA Stadium; Referee: Zaven Hovhannisyan |

=== UEFA Europa Conference League ===
==== Qualifying rounds ====
| 21 July 2022 Second qualifying round 1st leg | Ararat-Armenia | 0–0 | (Estonia) Paide Linnameeskond | Yerevan, Armenia |
| 19:00 (UTC+4) | Firmino (yellow card) 44' | Report | Saliste (yellow card) 41'; Mööl (yellow card) 67'; Saarma (yellow card) 85' | Stadium: FFA Stadium; Attendance: 1,400; Referee: Sandi Putros (Denmark) |

| 28 July 2022 Second qualifying round 2nd leg | Paide Linnameeskond (Estonia) | 0–0 (a.e.t.) (0–0 agg.) (5–3 p) | Ararat-Armenia | Pärnu, Estonia |
| 20:00 (UTC+4) | Klavan (yellow card) 33'; Yusif (yellow card) 83'; Simon (yellow card) 120+1' | Report | Tera (yellow card) 39'; Agdon (yellow card) 46'; Duarte (yellow card) 90+4'; Lima (yellow card) 113'; Firmino (yellow card) 120' | Stadium: Pärnu Rannastaadion; Attendance: 1,427; Referee: Damian Sylwestrzak (Poland) |
| | Penalties |
| | Mošnikov (penalty scored); Palumets (penalty scored); Singhateh (penalty scored); Saarma (penalty scored); Tambedou (penalty scored) | | (penalty scored) Alemão; (penalty scored) Lima; (penalty scored) Wbeymar; (penalty missed) Duarte |
Note: Paide Linnameeskond played their home match at the Pärnu Rannastaadion in Pärnu, instead of their regular stadium, the Paide linnastaadion, in Paide, which did not meet UEFA requirements.

== Statistics ==
As of match played 5 June 2023

=== Appearances and goals ===
| No. | Pos | Nat | Player | Total | | Premier League | | Armenian Cup | | UEFA Europa Conference League | |
| No. | Pos | Nat | Player | Apps | Goals | Apps | Goals | Apps | Goals | Apps | Goals |
|---|---|---|---|---|---|---|---|---|---|---|---|
| 2 | DF | (Brazil) BRA | Alemão | 28 | 5 | 24 | 5 | 1+1 | 0 | 2 | 0 |
| 3 | DF | (Colombia) COL | Junior Bueno | 26 | 0 | 23 | 0 | 1 | 0 | 2 | 0 |
| 5 | DF | (Armenia) ARM | Davit Terteryan | 20 | 0 | 15+4 | 0 | 1 | 0 | 0 | 0 |
| 7 | FW | (Portugal) POR | Hugo Firmino | 27 | 9 | 16+7 | 9 | 0+2 | 0 | 2 | 0 |
| 8 | MF | (Armenia) ARM | Gevorg Ghazaryan | 21 | 2 | 1+20 | 2 | 0 | 0 | 0 | 0 |
| 9 | FW | (Armenia) ARM | Artur Serobyan | 15 | 5 | 15 | 5 | 0 | 0 | 0 | 0 |
| 10 | MF | (Russia) RUS | Armen Ambartsumyan | 33 | 3 | 18+12 | 3 | 0+2 | 0 | 0+1 | 0 |
| 11 | MF | (Colombia) COL | Jonathan Duarte | 24 | 3 | 10+10 | 3 | 2 | 0 | 1+1 | 0 |
| 12 | MF | (Kenya) KEN | Amos Nondi | 14 | 1 | 14 | 1 | 0 | 0 | 0 | 0 |
| 14 | MF | (Cape Verde) CPV | Mailson Lima | 23 | 2 | 9+10 | 2 | 2 | 0 | 1+1 | 0 |
| 15 | FW | (Nigeria) NGR | Tenton Yenne | 37 | 10 | 32+2 | 10 | 0+1 | 0 | 1+1 | 0 |
| 16 | DF | (Armenia) ARM | Edgar Grigoryan | 9 | 0 | 9 | 0 | 0 | 0 | 0 | 0 |
| 17 | FW | (Nigeria) NGR | Hilary Gong | 10 | 0 | 0+10 | 0 | 0 | 0 | 0 | 0 |
| 18 | FW | (Armenia) ARM | Artyom Avanesyan | 34 | 1 | 16+14 | 1 | 2 | 0 | 1+1 | 0 |
| 19 | MF | (Armenia) ARM | Karen Muradyan | 38 | 0 | 27+7 | 0 | 2 | 0 | 2 | 0 |
| 20 | MF | (Kenya) KEN | Alwyn Tera | 34 | 1 | 25+7 | 1 | 0 | 0 | 1+1 | 0 |
| 21 | MF | (Armenia) ARM | Solomon Udo | 25 | 0 | 11+11 | 0 | 1 | 0 | 1+1 | 0 |
| 25 | DF | (Croatia) CRO | Dragan Lovrić | 9 | 0 | 8+1 | 0 | 0 | 0 | 0 | 0 |
| 27 | FW | (Nigeria) NGR | Taofiq Jibril | 15 | 4 | 1+14 | 4 | 0 | 0 | 0 | 0 |
| 29 | FW | (Nigeria) NGR | Jesse Akila | 17 | 1 | 0+16 | 1 | 0+1 | 0 | 0 | 0 |
| 32 | DF | (Colombia) COL | Carlos Pérez | 9 | 1 | 9 | 1 | 0 | 0 | 0 | 0 |
| 33 | GK | (Russia) RUS | Dmitry Abakumov | 1 | 0 | 0 | 0 | 1 | 0 | 0 | 0 |
| 34 | MF | (Armenia) ARM | Erik Smbatyan | 1 | 0 | 0+1 | 0 | 0 | 0 | 0 | 0 |
| 36 | MF | (Armenia) ARM | Michel Ayvazyan | 1 | 0 | 0+1 | 0 | 0 | 0 | 0 | 0 |
| 45 | GK | (Russia) RUS | Vsevolod Ermakov | 39 | 0 | 36 | 0 | 1 | 0 | 2 | 0 |
| 55 | MF | (Armenia) ARM | Hakob Hakobyan | 26 | 2 | 20+4 | 2 | 1 | 0 | 1 | 0 |
| 88 | FW | (Ivory Coast) CIV | Wilfried Eza | 37 | 16 | 25+9 | 13 | 1+1 | 3 | 0+1 | 0 |
Players away on loan:
| 6 | MF | (Armenia) ARM | Wbeymar | 9 | 0 | 1+5 | 0 | 2 | 0 | 0+1 | 0 |
| 9 | FW | (Brazil) BRA | Agdon Menezes | 15 | 4 | 6+5 | 3 | 1+1 | 1 | 2 | 0 |
| 23 | DF | (Armenia) ARM | Styopa Mkrtchyan | 10 | 0 | 8 | 0 | 2 | 0 | 0 | 0 |
Players who left Ararat-Armenia during the season:
| 4 | DF | (Armenia) ARM | Arman Hovhannisyan | 7 | 0 | 3+3 | 0 | 0 | 0 | 1 | 0 |
| 22 | DF | (Serbia) SRB | Miloš Stamenković | 5 | 0 | 4 | 0 | 1 | 0 | 0 | 0 |
| 30 | DF | (Brazil) BRA | Romércio | 17 | 2 | 14 | 2 | 0+1 | 0 | 2 | 0 |

=== Goal scorers ===
| Place | Position | Nation | Number | Name | Premier League | Armenian Cup | UEFA Europa Conference League | Total |
|---|---|---|---|---|---|---|---|---|
| 1 | FW | (Ivory Coast) | 88 | Wilfried Eza | 13 | 3 | 0 | 16 |
| 2 | FW | (Nigeria) | 15 | Tenton Yenne | 10 | 0 | 0 | 10 |
| 3 | FW | (Portugal) | 7 | Hugo Firmino | 9 | 0 | 0 | 9 |
| 4 | DF | (Brazil) | 2 | Alemão | 5 | 0 | 0 | 5 |
| 4 | FW | (Armenia) | 9 | Artur Serobyan | 5 | 0 | 0 | 5 |
| 6 | FW | (Nigeria) | 27 | Taofiq Jibril | 4 | 0 | 0 | 4 |
| 6 | FW | (Brazil) | 9 | Agdon Menezes | 3 | 1 | 0 | 4 |
| 8 | MF | (Colombia) | 11 | Jonathan Duarte | 3 | 0 | 0 | 3 |
| 8 | MF | (Russia) | 10 | Armen Ambartsumyan | 3 | 0 | 0 | 3 |
| 10 | MF | (Cape Verde) | 14 | Mailson Lima | 2 | 0 | 0 | 2 |
| 10 | DF | (Brazil) | 30 | Romércio | 2 | 0 | 0 | 2 |
| 10 | MF | (Armenia) | 55 | Hakob Hakobyan | 2 | 0 | 0 | 2 |
| 10 | MF | (Armenia) | 8 | Gevorg Ghazaryan | 2 | 0 | 0 | 2 |
| 10 | | | | Own goal | 2 | 0 | 0 | 2 |
| 15 | FW | (Armenia) | 18 | Artyom Avanesyan | 1 | 0 | 0 | 1 |
| 15 | FW | (Nigeria) | 29 | Jesse Akila | 1 | 0 | 0 | 1 |
| 15 | DF | (Colombia) | 32 | Carlos Pérez | 1 | 0 | 0 | 1 |
| 15 | MF | (Kenya) | 12 | Amos Nondi | 1 | 0 | 0 | 1 |
| 15 | MF | (Kenya) | 20 | Alwyn Tera | 1 | 0 | 0 | 1 |
| | | | | TOTALS | 70 | 4 | 0 | 74 |

=== Clean sheets ===
| Place | Position | Nation | Number | Name | Premier League | Armenian Cup | UEFA Europa Conference League | Total |
|---|---|---|---|---|---|---|---|---|
| 1 | GK | (Russia) | 45 | Vsevolod Ermakov | 17 | 1 | 2 | 20 |
| | | | | TOTALS | 17 | 1 | 2 | 20 |

=== Disciplinary record ===
| Number | Nation | Position | Name | Premier League | | Armenian Cup | | UEFA Europa Conference League | | Total | |
| Number | Nation | Position | Name | Booked | Sent off (straight red) | Booked | Sent off (straight red) | Booked | Sent off (straight red) | Booked | Sent off (straight red) |
| 2 | (Brazil) | DF | Alemão | 2 | 0 | 1 | 0 | 0 | 0 | 3 | 0 |
| 3 | (Colombia) | DF | Junior Bueno | 4 | 0 | 0 | 0 | 0 | 0 | 4 | 0 |
| 5 | (Armenia) | DF | Davit Terteryan | 5 | 0 | 0 | 0 | 0 | 0 | 5 | 0 |
| 7 | (Portugal) | FW | Hugo Firmino | 5 | 0 | 0 | 0 | 2 | 0 | 7 | 0 |
| 8 | (Armenia) | MF | Gevorg Ghazaryan | 3 | 0 | 0 | 0 | 0 | 0 | 3 | 0 |
| 9 | (Armenia) | FW | Artur Serobyan | 4 | 0 | 0 | 0 | 0 | 0 | 4 | 0 |
| 10 | (Russia) | MF | Armen Ambartsumyan | 7 | 0 | 0 | 0 | 0 | 0 | 7 | 0 |
| 11 | (Colombia) | MF | Jonathan Duarte | 5 | 0 | 0 | 0 | 1 | 0 | 6 | 0 |
| 12 | (Kenya) | MF | Amos Nondi | 6 | 0 | 0 | 0 | 0 | 0 | 6 | 0 |
| 14 | (Cape Verde) | MF | Mailson Lima | 3 | 0 | 1 | 0 | 1 | 0 | 5 | 0 |
| 15 | (Nigeria) | FW | Tenton Yenne | 3 | 0 | 0 | 0 | 0 | 0 | 3 | 0 |
| 16 | (Armenia) | DF | Edgar Grigoryan | 3 | 0 | 0 | 0 | 0 | 0 | 3 | 0 |
| 18 | (Armenia) | FW | Artyom Avanesyan | 2 | 0 | 0 | 0 | 0 | 0 | 2 | 0 |
| 19 | (Armenia) | MF | Karen Muradyan | 6 | 0 | 0 | 0 | 0 | 0 | 6 | 0 |
| 20 | (Kenya) | MF | Alwyn Tera | 5 | 0 | 0 | 0 | 1 | 0 | 6 | 0 |
| 21 | (Armenia) | MF | Solomon Udo | 3 | 1 | 0 | 0 | 0 | 0 | 3 | 1 |
| 25 | (Croatia) | DF | Dragan Lovrić | 2 | 0 | 0 | 0 | 0 | 0 | 2 | 0 |
| 29 | (Nigeria) | FW | Jesse Akila | 2 | 0 | 0 | 0 | 0 | 0 | 2 | 0 |
| 32 | (Colombia) | DF | Carlos Pérez | 2 | 1 | 0 | 0 | 0 | 0 | 2 | 1 |
| 45 | (Russia) | GK | Vsevolod Ermakov | 3 | 0 | 0 | 0 | 0 | 0 | 3 | 0 |
| 55 | (Armenia) | MF | Hakob Hakobyan | 5 | 0 | 0 | 0 | 0 | 0 | 5 | 0 |
| 88 | (Ivory Coast) | FW | Wilfried Eza | 2 | 0 | 0 | 0 | 0 | 0 | 2 | 0 |
Players away on loan:
| 6 | (Armenia) | MF | Wbeymar | 1 | 0 | 0 | 0 | 0 | 0 | 1 | 0 |
| 9 | (Brazil) | FW | Agdon Menezes | 1 | 0 | 0 | 0 | 1 | 0 | 2 | 0 |
| 23 | (Armenia) | DF | Styopa Mkrtchyan | 1 | 0 | 1 | 0 | 0 | 0 | 2 | 0 |
Players who left Ararat-Armenia during the season:
| 4 | (Armenia) | DF | Arman Hovhannisyan | 2 | 0 | 0 | 0 | 0 | 0 | 2 | 0 |
| 30 | (Brazil) | DF | Romércio | 1 | 0 | 0 | 0 | 0 | 0 | 1 | 0 |
| | | | TOTALS | 88 | 2 | 3 | 0 | 6 | 0 | 97 | 2 |
