= Styopa Mkrtchyan =

Armenian footballer

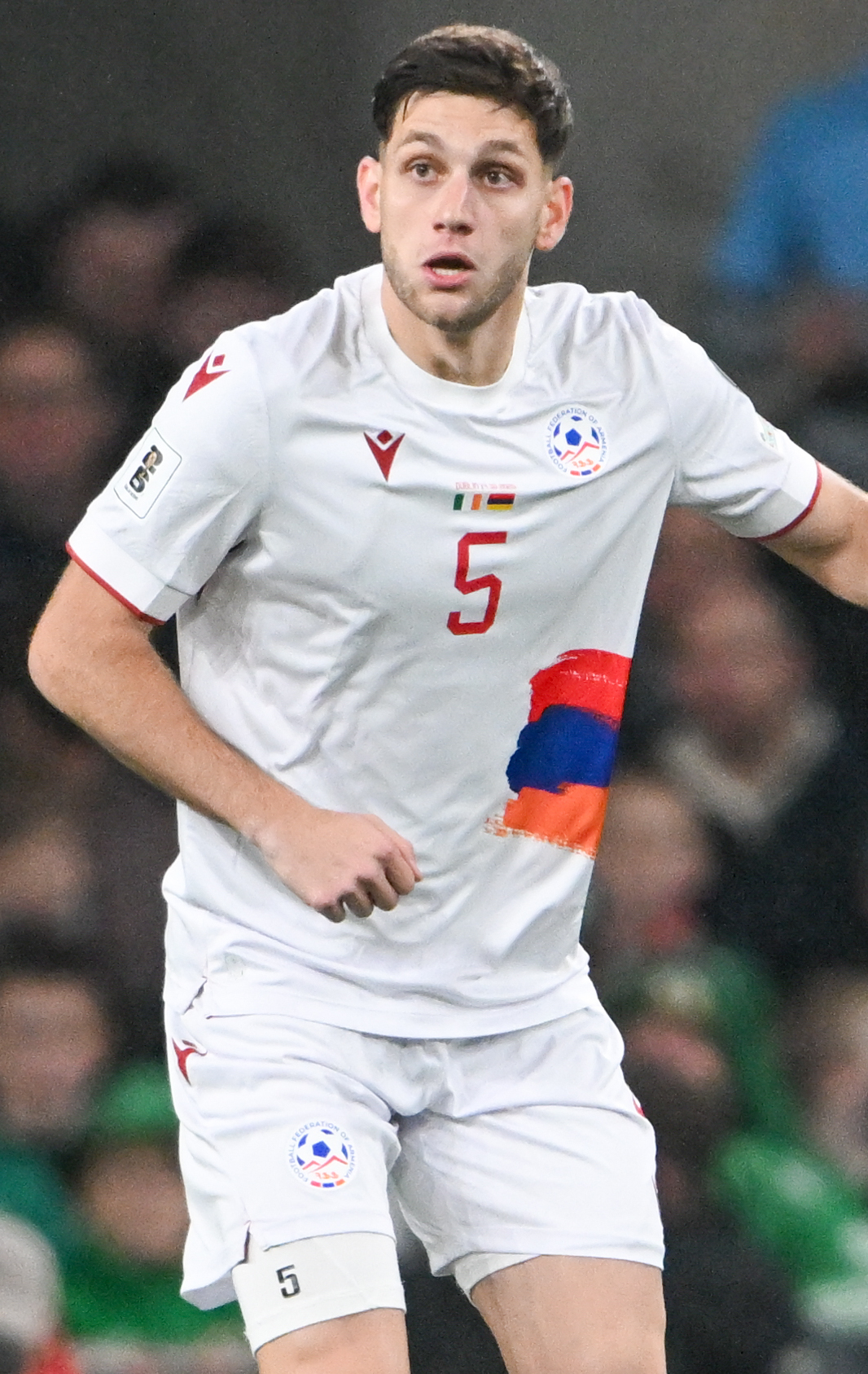
- Mkrtchyan with Armenia in 2025

Personal information
- Date of birth: 17 February 2003 (age 23)
- Place of birth: Yerevan, Armenia
- Height: 1.90 m (6 ft 3 in)
- Position: Centre back

Team information
- Current team: 1. FC Nürnberg
- Number: 5

Senior career*
Years	Team	Apps	(Gls)
2020–2024	Ararat-Armenia	8	(0)
2021–2022	→ BKMA Yerevan (loan)	30	(1)
2023	→ BKMA Yerevan (loan)	9	(2)
2023–2024	→ Osijek (loan)	14	(1)
2024–2026	Osijek	34	(0)
2026–	1. FC Nürnberg	3	(0)

International career^{‡}
2018–2021	Armenia U17	6	(0)
2019–2021	Armenia U19	3	(0)
2021	Armenia U21	4	(0)
2022–	Armenia	26	(0)
- * Club domestic league appearances and goals as of 18 May 2026 ‡ National team caps and goals as of 15 November 2026

Styopa Mkrtchyan (Armenian: Ստոյպա Մկրտչյան; born 17 February 2003) is an Armenian professional footballer who plays as a centre back for 2. Bundesliga club 1. FC Nürnberg and the Armenia national team.

== Club career ==
On 1 July 2022, Ararat-Armenia announced the return of Mkrtchyan from a season loan to BKMA Yerevan. On 28 February 2023, Mkrtchyan returned to BKMA Yerevan on loan for the remainder of the 2022/23 season.

On 21 July 2023, Mkrtchyan joined NK Osijek on a season-long loan deal with an option to make the move permanent. On 23 January 2024, NK Osijek announced the permanent signing of Mkrtchyan on a contract until the summer of 2026.

On 2 February 2026, Mkrtchyan signed a contract with 1. FC Nürnberg in German 2. Bundesliga.

== International career ==
He represented Armenia at the 2019 UEFA European Under-19 Championship.

In March 2022, Mkrtchyan was called up to the senior Armenia national team for the first time. Mkrtchyan made his international debut for Armenia on 24 March 2022 in a friendly match against Montenegro, where he played the full game.

== Personal life ==
Mkrtchyan speaks Armenian, English, and Russian.

== Career statistics ==
=== Club ===
As of match played 8 December 2024

Appearances and goals by club, season and competition
Club	Season	League			National cup (Note: Includes Armenian Cup, Croatian Football Cup)		Europe		Total	
Club	Season	Division	Apps	Goals	Apps	Goals	Apps	Goals	Apps	Goals
Ararat-Armenia	2020–21	Armenian Premier League	0	0	0	0	0	0	0	0
Ararat-Armenia	2021–22	Armenian Premier League	0	0	0	0	–		0	0
Ararat-Armenia	2022–23	Armenian Premier League	8	0	2	0	0	0	10	0
Ararat-Armenia	2023–24	Armenian Premier League	0	0	0	0	0	0	0	0
Ararat-Armenia	Total		8	0	2	0	0	0	10	0
BKMA Yerevan (loan)	2021–22	Armenian Premier League	30	1	1	0	–		31	1
BKMA Yerevan (loan)	2022–23	Armenian Premier League	9	2	0	0	–		9	2
NK Osijek (loan)	2023–24	Croatian Football League	14	1	2	0	4 (Note: Appearances in UEFA Conference League)	0	20	1
NK Osijek	2024–25	Croatian Football League	3	0	0	0	2	0	5	0
Career total			64	4	5	0	6	0	75	4

=== International ===
As of match played 15 November 2026

Armenia
Year	Apps	Goals
2022	7	0
2023	8	0
2024	3	0
2025	5	0
2026	3	0
Total	26	0
