= 2021–22 FC Ararat-Armenia season =

Ararat-Armenia
2021–22 season
- Director: Poghos Galstyan
- Manager: Dmitri Gunko
- Stadium: Republican Stadium; FFA Academy Stadium
- Premier League: 2nd
- Armenian Cup: Quarter-finals vs Noravank
- Top goalscorer: League: Mailson Lima (18); All: Mailson Lima (19)
Home colours	Away colours

The 2021–22 season was FC Ararat-Armenia's 4th season in Armenian Premier League, in which they finished runners-up to Pyunik by one point and where knocked out of the Armenian Cup by eventual winners Noravank.

== Season events ==
On 24 June, Ararat-Armenia announced the signing of Valerio Vimercati from Noah. The following day, 25 June, Ararat-Armenia announced the signing of Wilfried Eza from Van.

On 6 July, Ararat-Armenia announced the return of Mailson Lima from Dibba Al-Hisn, with Alwyn Tera joining from Saburtalo on 9 July.

On 4 August, Ararat-Armenia announced the signing of Karen Muradyan on a free transfer after his contract with Ararat Yerevan had expired.

On 5 August, Ararat-Armenia announced the signing of Diego Barboza from Enosis Neon Paralimni.

On 12 October, Yoan Gouffran announced his retirement from football.

On 9 January, Ararat-Armenia announced that Dan Spătaru had left the club after his contract had expired.

On 25 January, Ararat-Armenia announced the signing of Romércio from Remo.

On 29 January, Ararat-Armenia announced the signings of Thibaut Lesquoy from Almere City and Jonathan Duarte from Orsomarso. The following day, 30 January, Solomon Udo joined from Shakhter Karagandy.

== Squad ==
As of match played 28 May 2022

Number	Name	Nationality	Position	Date of birth (age)	Signed from	Signed in	Contract ends	Apps.	Goals
Goalkeepers
33	Dmitry Abakumov	(Russia)	GK	8 July 1989 (aged 32)	Luch Vladivostok	2018		84	0
77	Valerio Vimercati	(Italy)	GK	4 March 1995 (aged 27)	Noah	2021		30	0
Defenders
2	Alemão	(Brazil)	DF	7 December 1992 (aged 29)	Oliveirense	2020		54	1
3	Junior Bueno	(Colombia)	DF	3 September 1996 (aged 25)	Once Caldas	2021		36	1
5	Davit Terteryan	(Armenia)	DF	17 December 1997 (aged 24)	Gandzasar Kapan	2021		44	1
11	Yehor Klymenchuk	(Ukraine)	DF	11 November 1997 (aged 24)	Lviv	2021		25	0
12	Thibaut Lesquoy	(Belgium)	DF	7 July 1995 (aged 26)	Almere City	2022		7	0
30	Romércio	(Brazil)	DF	25 February 1997 (aged 25)	Remo	2022		14	1
79	Serhiy Vakulenko	(Ukraine)	DF	7 September 1993 (aged 28)	Karpaty Lviv	2020		63	7
81	Diego Barboza	(Uruguay)	DF	9 January 1991 (aged 31)	Enosis Neon Paralimni	2021		5	0
Midfielders
6	Wbeymar	(Armenia)	MF	6 March 1992 (aged 30)	Gandzasar Kapan	2020		43	1
7	Zhirayr Shaghoyan	(Armenia)	MF	10 April 2001 (aged 21)	Youth Team	2017		64	11
8	Jonathan Duarte	(Colombia)	MF	25 May 1997 (aged 25)	Orsomarso	2022		14	4
10	Armen Ambartsumyan	(Russia)	MF	11 April 1994 (aged 28)	Fakel Voronezh	2018		108	5
14	Mailson Lima	(Cape Verde)	MF	29 May 1994 (aged 27)	Dibba Al-Hisn	2021		102	39
19	Karen Muradyan	(Armenia)	MF	11 November 1992 (aged 29)	Ararat Yerevan	2021		28	0
20	Alwyn Tera	(Kenya)	MF	18 January 1997 (aged 25)	Saburtalo Tbilisi	2021		30	1
21	Solomon Udo	(Armenia)	MF	15 July 1995 (aged 26)	Shakhter Karagandy	2022		15	0
25	Davit Nalbandyan	(Armenia)	MF	9 August 1999 (aged 22)	Youth Team	2017		26	0
27	Furdjel Narsingh	(Netherlands)	MF	13 March 1988 (aged 34)	De Graafschap	2019		85	5
Forwards
17	Zakaria Sanogo	(Burkina Faso)	FW	11 December 1996 (aged 25)	Rahimo	2019		92	7
18	Artyom Avanesyan	(Armenia)	FW	17 July 1999 (aged 22)	Ararat Moscow	2018		54	10
24	Yusuf Otubanjo	(Nigeria)	FW	12 September 1992 (aged 29)	LASK	2020		72	29
88	Wilfried Eza	(Ivory Coast)	FW	28 December 1996 (aged 25)	Van	2021		32	8
Away on loan
4	Albert Khachumyan	(Armenia)	DF	23 June 1999 (aged 22)	Youth Team	2017		62	4
5	Sargis Shahinyan	(Armenia)	MF	10 September 1995 (aged 26)	Lori	2020		27	1
9	Artur Serobyan	(Armenia)	FW	2 July 2003 (aged 18)	Youth Team	2020		16	0
	Narek Alaverdyan	(Armenia)	MF	19 February 2002 (aged 20)	Youth Team	2019		2	0
Left during the season
8	Yoan Gouffran	(France)	MF	25 May 1986 (aged 36)	Unattached	2020		50	2
13	Vardan Shahatuni	(Armenia)	GK	13 March 1998 (aged 24)	Lori	2020		0	0
94	Dan Spătaru	(Moldova)	MF	24 May 1994 (aged 28)	Noah	2020		16	0
99	Armen Hovhannisyan	(Armenia)	FW	7 March 2000 (aged 22)	Nitra	2020		34	15

=== Out on loan ===
Note: Flags indicate national team as defined under FIFA eligibility rules; some limited exceptions apply. Players may hold more than one non-FIFA nationality.

No.	Pos.	Nation	Player
4	DF	ARM	Albert Khachumyan (at BKMA Yerevan)
5	MF	ARM	Sargis Shahinyan (at Noah)
9	FW	ARM	Artur Serobyan (at BKMA Yerevan)

== Transfers ==
=== In ===
Date	Position	Nationality	Name	From	Fee	Ref.
24 June 2021	GK	(Italy)	Valerio Vimercati	Noah	Undisclosed	
25 June 2021	FW	(Ivory Coast)	Wilfried Eza	Van	Undisclosed	
6 July 2021	MF	(Cape Verde)	Mailson Lima	Dibba Al-Hisn	Undisclosed	
9 July 2021	MF	(Kenya)	Alwyn Tera	Saburtalo Tbilisi	Undisclosed	
4 August 2021	MF	(Armenia)	Karen Muradyan	Ararat Yerevan	Free	
5 August 2021	DF	(Uruguay)	Diego Barboza	Enosis Neon Paralimni	Free	
25 January 2022	DF	(Brazil)	Romércio	Remo	Undisclosed	
29 January 2022	DF	(Belgium)	Thibaut Lesquoy	Almere City	Undisclosed	
29 January 2022	MF	(Colombia)	Jonathan Duarte	Orsomarso	Undisclosed	
30 January 2022	MF	(Armenia)	Solomon Udo	Shakhter Karagandy	Undisclosed	

=== Out ===
Date	Position	Nationality	Name	To	Fee	Ref.
22 June 2021	FW	(Peru)	Jeisson Martínez	Albacete	Undisclosed	
29 July 2021	MF	(Armenia)	Armen Nahapetyan	BKMA Yerevan	Undisclosed	
7 March 2022	FW	(Armenia)	Armen Hovhannisyan	Zimbru Chișinău	Undisclosed	

=== Loans out ===
Date from	Position	Nationality	Name	To	Date to	Ref.
26 July 2020	MF	(Armenia)	Narek Alaverdyan	BKMA Yerevan	Undisclosed	
1 July 2021	MF	(Armenia)	Sargis Shahinyan	Noah	End of season	
23 August 2021	FW	(Armenia)	Artur Serobyan	BKMA Yerevan	End of season	
20 January 2022	DF	(Armenia)	Albert Khachumyan	BKMA Yerevan	End of season	

=== Released ===
Date	Position	Nationality	Name	Joined	Date	Ref
1 June 2021	DF	(North Macedonia)	Aleksandar Damčevski	Partizani Tirana		
2 June 2021	DF	(Portugal)	Ângelo Meneses	Rio Ave		
3 June 2021	DF	(Spain)	David Bollo	Antequera		
7 June 2021	FW	(Armenia)	Aleksandr Karapetyan	Noah	8 June 2021	
9 June 2021	MF	(Sweden)	Heradi Rashidi	Brommapojkarna	14 February 2022	
2 July 2021	GK	(Serbia)	Nikola Petrić	Proleter Novi Sad		
12 October 2021	MF	(France)	Yoan Gouffran	Retirement		
9 January 2022	MF	(Moldova)	Dan Spătaru	Noah	1 February 2022	
9 January 2022	GK	(Armenia)	Vardan Shahatuni	Noah	9 January 2022	
2 June 2022	FW	(Nigeria)	Yusuf Otubanjo	Pyunik	11 June 2022	
17 June 2022	GK	(Italy)	Valerio Vimercati	Noah	27 July 2023	
30 June 2022	DF	(Belgium)	Thibaut Lesquoy	Willem II	1 July 2022	
30 June 2022	DF	(Ukraine)	Yehor Klymenchuk	Metalist Kharkiv		
30 June 2022	DF	(Ukraine)	Serhiy Vakulenko	Pyunik	3 July 2022	
30 June 2022	DF	(Uruguay)	Diego Barboza	Novelda	18 August 2022	
30 June 2022	MF	(Armenia)	Armen Nahapetyan	Noah	1 July 2022	
30 June 2022	MF	(Armenia)	Sargis Shahinyan	Alashkert	1 July 2022	
30 June 2022	MF	(Netherlands)	Furdjel Narsingh			
30 June 2022	FW	(Burkina Faso)	Zakaria Sanogo	JS Kabylie	1 July 2022	

== Friendlies ==
7 July 2021	Ararat-Armenia	1–1	Sevan	Yerevan
18:30 (UTC+4)	Eza	Report	Goal	Stadium: Avan Academy Stadium

10 July 2021	Ararat-Armenia	1–1	Van	Yerevan
18:30 (UTC+4)	Ambartsumyan	Report	Goal	Stadium: Avan Academy Stadium

16 July 2021	Telavi (Georgia (country))	1–0	Ararat-Armenia	Georgia
(UTC+4)	Goal	Report

19 July 2021	Sioni Bolnisi (Georgia (country))	0–3	Ararat-Armenia	Georgia
(UTC+4)		Report	Otubanjo; Ambartsumyan

25 July 2021	Ararat-Armenia	2–1	Noravank	Yerevan
17:00 (UTC+4)	(o.g.); Eza	Report	Goal	Stadium: Avan Academy Stadium; Attendance: 0

1 February 2022	Ararat-Armenia	2–3	(Slovakia) Slovan Bratislava	Sharjah, United Arab Emirates
16:00 (UTC+4)	Ambartsumyan 32'; Lima 68'	Report	Weiss 60'; Mráz 73'; Zmrhal 75'

7 February 2022	Ararat-Armenia	0–0	(Russia) Rodina Moscow	Sharjah, United Arab Emirates
(UTC+4)		Report

9 February 2022	Ararat-Armenia	2–1	(Russia) Ural Yekaterinburg	Sharjah, United Arab Emirates
(UTC+4)	Avanesyan 4'; Eza 9'	Report	Bicfalvi 75'

== Competitions ==
=== Overall record ===
Competition	First match	Last match	Starting round	Final position	Record							
Competition	First match	Last match	Starting round	Final position	Pld	W	D	L	GF	GA	GD	Win %
Premier League	1 August 2021	28 May 2022	Matchday 1	2nd	32	23	5	4	56	20	+36	71.88
Armenian Cup	16 September 2021	24 November 2021	First round	Quarterfinal	2	1	0	1	3	3	+0	50.00
Total					34	24	5	5	59	23	+36	70.59

Last updated: 28 May 2022
Source: Competitions

=== Premier League ===
==== Results summary ====
Overall								Home						Away					
Pld	W	D	L	GF	GA	GD	Pts	W	D	L	GF	GA	GD	W	D	L	GF	GA	GD
32	23	5	4	56	20	+36	74	10	4	2	30	13	+17	13	1	2	26	7	+19

Last updated: 28 May 2022.
Source: See Results

==== Results by round ====
Round	1	2	3	4	5	6	7	8	9	10	11	12	13	14	15	16	17	18	19	20	21	22	23	24	25	26	27	28	29	30	31	32	33	34	35	36
Ground	A	H	A	A	H	A	H	A	H	H	A	H	H	A	H	A (Note: Between matchday 15 and 16, Sevan were expelled from the league.)	H	A	A	H	A	A	A	A	H	A	H	H	A	H	H	H	H	A	H	A
Result	W	W	W	W	W	W	W	V	W	W	W	L	W	W	W	D	V	W	W	D	L	W	W	L	D	V	W	D	W	D	W	L	W	W	P	W
Position	5	3	2	1	1	1	1	1	1	1	1	1	1	1	1	1	1	1	1	1	1	1	1	1	1	1	1	2	2	2	2	2	2	2	2	2

Updated to match(es) played on 28 May 2022. Source: See Results
A = Away; H = Home; W = Win; D = Draw; L = Loss; P = Postponed; V = Void

==== Results ====
1 August 2021 1	Alashkert	0–3	Ararat-Armenia	Yerevan
17:00 (UTC+4)	Voskanyan (yellow card) 26'; Gome (yellow card) 87'; Kadio (yellow card) 90+4'	Report	Eza 61'; Otubanjo 67'; Wbeymar (yellow card) 73'; A.Avanesyan 75'	Stadium: Alashkert Stadium; Attendance: 500; Referee: Ashot Ghaltakchyan

6 August 2021 2	Ararat-Armenia	3–2	BKMA Yerevan	Yerevan
19:00 (UTC+4)	Lima 22' (pen.), 47'; A.Avanesyan 28'; Wbeymar (yellow card) 66'	Report	G.Petrosyan 54'; N.Alaverdyan (yellow card) 62'; E.Piloyan (yellow card) 72'; M.Mirzoyan 89'; A.Khamoyan (yellow card) 90+3'; D.Aghbalyan (yellow card) 90+4'	Stadium: FFA Academy Stadium; Attendance: 300; Referee: Henrik Nalbandyan

15 August 2021 3	Pyunik	0–3	Ararat-Armenia	Yerevan
19:00 (UTC+4)	Musalov (yellow card) 52'; Buchnev (yellow card) 84'	Report	Otubanjo 22', 45'; Terteryan (yellow card) 41'; Alemão (yellow card) 48'; Vakulenko (yellow card) 49'; A.Tera 71'	Stadium: FFA Academy Stadium; Attendance: 800; Referee: Zaven Hovhannisyan
Note: Match played at the FFA Academy Stadium in Yerevan, instead of Pyunik's regular Republican Stadium in Yerevan.

20 August 2021 4	Noravank	0–2	Ararat-Armenia	Charentsavan
17:00 (UTC+4)	J.Ufuoma (yellow card) 32'; Mustafin (yellow card) 76'	Report	Eza 23', 53'; Lima (yellow card) 32'; Khachumyan (yellow card) 70'	Stadium: Charentsavan City Stadium; Attendance: 250; Referee: Artem Gasparyan

25 August 2021 5	Ararat-Armenia	5–2	Noah	Yerevan
17:00 (UTC+4)	Lima 17', 49' (pen.) (yellow card) 66'; Alemão (yellow card) 32'; Otubanjo (yellow card) 52' (goal) 59'; Narsingh (yellow card) 55'; Eza 85'; Z.Shaghoyan 88' (yellow card) 90'	Report	Karapetyan 10'; Gyasi 41'; S.Gomes (yellow card) 45'; Dedechko (yellow card) 66'; Velemir (yellow card) 85'	Stadium: FFA Academy Stadium; Attendance: 400; Referee: Artem Gasparyan

12 September 2021 6	Van	1–2	Ararat-Armenia	Charentsavan
16:00 (UTC+4)	L.Menezes 34'	Report	Vakulenko (yellow card) 89'; Avanesyan 90+1'; Lima 90+4'; Wbeymar (yellow card) 90+7'; Ambartsumyan (yellow card) 90+7'	Stadium: Charentsavan City Stadium; Attendance: 600; Referee: Ashot Ghaltakchyan

22 September 2021 7	Ararat-Armenia	3–0	Urartu	Yerevan
18:00 (UTC+4)	Lima 47' (pen.), 52'; Shaghoyan 81' (yellow card) 88'	Report		Stadium: FFA Academy Stadium; Attendance: 300; Referee: Zaven Hovhannisyan

29 September 2021 8	Sevan	v	Ararat-Armenia	Yerevan
16:30 (UTC+4)	Danielyan (yellow card) 25'; Rudoselsky (yellow card) 36'; Luiz Matheus (yellow card) 48'; E.Jatta (yellow card) 85' (yellow-red card) 86'; Aleksić (yellow card) 90+5'; M.Sahakyan (yellow card) 90+5'; Kartashyan (yellow card) 90+5'	Report	Eza (yellow card) 44'; Bueno (yellow card) 90+5'; Khachumyan (yellow card) 90+5'; Spătaru (yellow card) 90+5'; Terteryan (red card) 90+5'	Stadium: Alashkert Stadium; Attendance: 800; Referee: Ashot Ghaltakchyan
Note: Match declared void on 1 December 2021.

17 October 2021 9	Ararat-Armenia	3–0	Ararat Yerevan	Yerevan
16:00 (UTC+4)	Lima 61'; Otubanjo 66', 90+6'; Klymenchuk (yellow card) 87'	Report	G.Malakyan (yellow card) 12'; Aliyu (yellow card) 63'; R.Mkrtchyan (yellow card) 89'	Stadium: FFA Academy Stadium; Referee: Zaven Hovhannisyan

24 October 2021 10	Ararat-Armenia	2–1	Alashkert	Yerevan
20:00 (UTC+4)	Ambartsumyan 22'; Lima (yellow card) 33' (goal) 67'; Bueno (yellow card) 42'; Sanogo (yellow card) 90+4'	Report	Embaló 31'; Kadio (yellow card) 43'; James (yellow card) 90'	Stadium: FFA Academy Stadium; Referee: Henrik Nalbandyan

27 October 2021 11	BKMA Yerevan	2–3	Ararat-Armenia	Yerevan
13:30 (UTC+4)	M.Grigoryan 27'; M.Mirzoyan 58'	Report	Lima 11' (pem.); Ambartsumyan (yellow card) 45'; Otubanjo 62', 76'	Stadium: FFA Academy Stadium; Attendance: 150; Referee: Sargis Khachatryan

1 November 2021 12	Ararat-Armenia	1–2	Pyunik	Yerevan
18:00 (UTC+4)	A.Tera (yellow card) 83'; Lima 90'	Report	Caraballo 19'; Šećerović (yellow card) 28'; Musalov (yellow card) 45'; Harutyunyan 57'; Hovhannisyan (yellow card) 69'; Bruno (red card) 72'; Buchnev (yellow card) 80'; Grigoryan (yellow card) 87'	Stadium: FFA Academy Stadium; Attendance: 700; Referee: Henrik Nalbandyan

6 November 2021 13	Ararat-Armenia	2–1	Noravank	Yerevan
16:00 (UTC+4)	Avanesyan 24'; Lima (yellow card) 28'; Muradyan (yellow card) 34'; Eza 54'	Report	Orlov (yellow card) 10' (goal) 48'; J.Ufuoma (yellow card) 13'; Ebert (yellow card) 67'	Stadium: FFA Academy Stadium; Attendance: 350; Referee: Sargis Khachatryan

19 November 2021 14	Noah	0–1	Ararat-Armenia	Yerevan
16:00 (UTC+4)	Gabarayev (yellow card) 80'	Report	Lima 69'; Terteryan (yellow card) 85'	Stadium: FFA Academy Stadium; Attendance: 500; Referee: Zaven Hovhannisyan

28 November 2021 15	Ararat-Armenia	2–0	Van	Yerevan
15:00 (UTC+4)	Bueno (red card) 7'; Muradyan (yellow card) 41'; Eza 86', 90+2'	Report	Bruno (penalty missed) 8'; E.Mireku (yellow card) 9' (yellow-red card) 44'; L.Menezes (yellow card) 18'; V.Ayvazyan (yellow card) 87'; J.Gaba (yellow card) 90+2'	Stadium: FFA Academy Stadium; Attendance: 300; Referee: Shahen Aghayan

3 December 2021 16	Urartu	0–0	Ararat-Armenia	Yerevan
18:30 (UTC+4)		Report	Sanogo (yellow card) 65'	Stadium: Urartu Stadium; Attendance: 700; Referee: Zaven Hovhannisyan

10/12 December 2021 17	Ararat-Armenia	Bye	Sevan	Yerevan
(UTC+4)				Stadium: Republican Stadium
Note: Sevan expelled from the league on 1 December 2021.

19 February 2022 18	Ararat Yerevan	0–1	Ararat-Armenia	Charentsavan
14:00 (UTC+4)		Report	Lima 28'; Terteryan (yellow card) 59'	Stadium: Charentsavan City Stadium; Referee: Henrik Nalbandyan

25 February 2022 19	Alashkert	0–1	Ararat-Armenia	Yerevan
14:00 (UTC+4)	V.Ayvazyan (yellow card) 27'	Report	Terteryan (yellow card) 17'; Romércio (yellow card) 54' (goal) 90+7'	Stadium: Alashkert Stadium; Referee: Henrik Nalbandyan

2 March 2022 20	Ararat-Armenia	0–0	BKMA Yerevan	Yerevan
16:00 (UTC+4)	Lesquoy (yellow card) 76'; Terteryan (yellow card) 85'; Romércio (yellow card) 88'	Report	A.Galstyan (yellow card) 69'; Ishkhanyan (yellow card) 86'	Stadium: Republican Stadium; Referee: Artem Gasparyan

6 March 2022 21	Pyunik	1–0	Ararat-Armenia	Yerevan
17:00 (UTC+4)	Bratkov (yellow card) 8'; Firmino 51'; Dashyan (yellow card) 70'	Report	Lima (yellow card) 8'; Bueno (yellow card) 56'; Udo (yellow card) 90+7'	Stadium: FFA Academy Stadium; Referee: Zaven Hovhannisyan

10 March 2022 22	Noravank	0–2	Ararat-Armenia	Charentsavan
15:00 (UTC+4)	Ebert (yellow card) 48'; Rudoselsky (yellow card) 81'; Bashilov (yellow card) 83'	Report	Sanogo 19'; Otubanjo 28'; Ambartsumyan (yellow card) 77'	Stadium: Charentsavan City Stadium; Referee: Shahen Aghayan

14 March 2022 23	Noah	0–3	Ararat-Armenia	Armavir
15:00 (UTC+4)	Spătaru (yellow card) 50'; Monroy (yellow card) 69'	Report	Wbeymar (yellow card) 27'; J.Duarte 42'; Lima 58'; Sanogo 75'; Udo (yellow card) 82'	Stadium: Armavir City Stadium; Referee: Zaven Hovhannisyan

20 March 2022 24	Van	2–1	Ararat-Armenia	Charentsavan
14:00 (UTC+4)	V.Filippov 71'; Badoyan 75'; N.Hovhannisyan (yellow card) 85'	Report	J.Duarte 17'	Stadium: Charentsavan City Stadium; Referee: Artem Gasparyan

8 April 2022 25	Ararat-Armenia	1–1	Urartu	Yerevan
18:00 (UTC+4)	Mailson 30' (pen.) (yellow card) 77'; Wbeymar (yellow card) 33'; Muradyan (yellow card) 38'; Bueno (yellow card) 77'	Report	Désiré (yellow card) 6'; Miranyan 34'; Beglaryan (yellow card) 80'	Stadium: Republican Stadium; Referee: Henrik Nalbandyan

11 April 2022 26	Sevan	BYE	Ararat-Armenia	Yerevan
(UTC+4)				Stadium: Alashkert Stadium
Note: Sevan expelled from the league on 1 December 2021.

15 April 2022 27	Ararat-Armenia	3–1	Ararat Yerevan	Yerevan
15:00 (UTC+4)	Romércio (yellow card) 22' (yellow-red card) 41'; Alemão 27'; Lima 51'; V.Yermakov 70' (o.g.); Bueno (yellow card) 89'	Report	Ra.Hakobyan 42'; Aliyu (yellow card) 58' (yellow-red card) 63'	Stadium: FFA Academy Stadium; Referee: Vardan Manukyan

19 April 2022 28	Ararat-Armenia	1–1	Alashkert	Yerevan
19:00 (UTC+4)	Vimercati (yellow card) 70'; Alemão (yellow card) 70'; J.Duarte 83'	Report	Kadio (yellow card) 45+1'; Khurtsidze 90'	Stadium: FFA Academy Stadium

25 April 2022 29	BKMA Yerevan	0–1	Ararat-Armenia	Yerevan
15:00 (UTC+4)	A.Khamoyan (yellow card) 22'	Report	Eza 58'	Stadium: FFA Academy Stadium; Referee: Shahen Aghayan

29 April 2022 30	Ararat-Armenia	1–1	Pyunik	Yerevan
20:00 (UTC+4)	Wbeymar (yellow card) 47'; Narsingh 82'; J.Duarte (yellow card) 90+2'	Report	González (yellow card) 54'; Firmino 63'	Stadium: FFA Academy Stadium; Referee: Henrik Nalbandyan

3 May 2022 31	Ararat-Armenia	2–0	Noravank	Yerevan
19:30 (UTC+4)	J.Duarte 26'; Lima 71' (pen.) (yellow card) 89'	Report	Avagyan (yellow card) 69'; J.Ufuoma (yellow card) 87'	Stadium: FFA Academy Stadium

9 May 2022 32	Ararat-Armenia	0–1	Noah	Yerevan
19:30 (UTC+4)		Report	Lavrishchev 3'; S.Shahinyan (yellow card) 7'; A.Oliveira (yellow card) 50'; V.Shahatuni (yellow card) 90+4'; Matviyenko (yellow card) 90+7'	Stadium: FFA Academy Stadium; Referee: Shahen Aghayan

14 May 2022 33	Ararat-Armenia	1–0	Van	Yerevan
19:00 (UTC+4)	Bueno (yellow card) 45+1'; Vakulenko 70'	Report		Stadium: FFA Academy Stadium; Referee: Vardan Manukyan

22 May 2022 34	Urartu	1–2	Ararat-Armenia	Yerevan
16:45 (UTC+4)	S.Hakobyan 73'; A.Ghazaryan (yellow card) 89'	Report	Ambartsumyan 14' (yellow card) 66'; Lima 16'; Wbeymar (yellow card) 36'	Stadium: Urartu Stadium; Referee: Shahen Aghayan

22 May 2022 35	Ararat-Armenia	Bye	Sevan	Yerevan
(UTC+4)				Stadium: Republican Stadium
Note: Sevan expelled from the league on 1 December 2021.

28 May 2022 36	Ararat Yerevan	0–1	Ararat-Armenia	Yerevan
19:00 (UTC+4)	A.Dagrou (yellow card) 88'	Report	Z.Shaghoyan 38'; Terteryan (yellow card) 77'; Romércio (yellow card) 79'	Stadium: Republican Stadium; Referee: Vardan Manukyan

==== Table ====
Pos	Team	Pld	W	D	L	GF	GA	GD	Pts	Qualification or relegation
1	Pyunik (C)	32	23	6	3	52	25	+27	75	Qualification for the Champions League first qualifying round
2	Ararat-Armenia	32	23	5	4	56	20	+36	74	Qualification for the Europa Conference League second qualifying round (Note: The 2021–22 Armenian Cup winners, Noravank, did not obtain an UEFA license and was replaced.)
3	Alashkert	32	14	9	9	38	30	+8	51	Qualification for the Europa Conference League first qualifying round
4	Ararat Yerevan	32	13	7	12	47	36	+11	46	Qualification for the Europa Conference League first qualifying round
5	Urartu	32	9	13	10	37	32	+5	40	
6	Noah	32	9	12	11	38	43	−5	39	
7	Noravank	32	7	7	18	36	55	−19	28	
8	Van	32	6	7	19	19	47	−28	25	
9	BKMA (O)	32	4	6	22	25	60	−35	18	Qualification to the relegation play-offs
10	Sevan (D, R)	0	0	0	0	0	0	0	0	Relegation to the Armenian First League (Note: Sevan was expelled from the league on 1 December 2021.)

Source: FFA Soccerway
Rules for classification: 1) Points; 2) Head-to-head points; 3) Head-to-head goal difference; 4) Head-to-head goals scored; 5) Matches won; 6) Goal difference; 7) Less red cards; 8) Less yellow cards; 9) Fair-play ranking 10) Draw
(C) Champions; (D) Disqualified; (O) Play-off winners; (R) Relegated

=== Armenian Cup ===
16 September 2021 First round	Lernayin Artsakh	1–2	Ararat-Armenia	Sisian
15:30 (UTC+4)	M.Badjie 41'; K.Sow (yellow card) 50'; S.Asryan (yellow card) 74'; S.Metoyan (yellow card) 82'	Report	Avanesyan 18'; Klymenchuk (yellow card) 39'; Lima 86'	Stadium: Sisian City Stadium; Attendance: 100; Referee: Ashot Ghaltakchyan

24 November 2021 Quarter-finals	Noravank	2–1	Ararat-Armenia	Charentsavan
14:00 (UTC+4)	Mustafin 28'; Ebert (yellow card) 46'; Orlov 69' (yellow card) 90'; D.Polyanskiy (yellow card) 88'	Report	Klymenchuk (yellow card) 17'; Otubanjo 71'; Ambartsumyan (yellow card) 88'; Terteryan (yellow card) 90'	Stadium: Charentsavan City Stadium; Attendance: 100; Referee: Ashot Ghaltakchyan

== Statistics ==
As of match played 28 May 2022

=== Appearances and goals ===
No.	Pos	Nat	Player	Total		Premier League		Armenian Cup	
No.	Pos	Nat	Player	Apps	Goals	Apps	Goals	Apps	Goals
2	DF	(Brazil) BRA	Alemão	32	1	30	1	2	0
3	DF	(Colombia) COL	Junior Bueno	23	0	21+1	0	0+1	0
5	DF	(Armenia) ARM	Davit Terteryan	28	0	25+2	0	0+1	0
6	MF	(Armenia) ARM	Wbeymar	29	0	25+2	0	2	0
7	MF	(Armenia) ARM	Zhirayr Shaghoyan	30	3	6+22	3	2	0
8	MF	(Colombia) COL	Jonathan Duarte	14	4	13+1	4	0	0
10	MF	(Russia) RUS	Armen Ambartsumyan	21	2	9+10	2	2	0
11	DF	(Ukraine) UKR	Yehor Klymenchuk	21	0	8+11	0	2	0
12	DF	(Belgium) BEL	Thibaut Lesquoy	6	0	3+3	0	0	0
14	MF	(Cape Verde) CPV	Mailson Lima	33	19	30+2	18	0+1	1
17	FW	(Burkina Faso) BFA	Zakaria Sanogo	24	2	7+15	2	1+1	0
18	FW	(Armenia) ARM	Artyom Avanesyan	33	5	24+7	4	2	1
19	MF	(Armenia) ARM	Karen Muradyan	28	0	14+13	0	0+1	0
20	MF	(Kenya) KEN	Alwyn Tera	30	1	20+9	1	0+1	0
21	MF	(Armenia) ARM	Solomon Udo	15	0	3+12	0	0	0
24	FW	(Nigeria) NGR	Yusuf Otubanjo	26	10	15+9	9	0+2	1
27	MF	(Netherlands) NED	Furdjel Narsingh	26	1	17+9	1	0	0
30	DF	(Brazil) BRA	Romércio	14	1	14	1	0	0
33	GK	(Russia) RUS	Dmitry Abakumov	5	0	3	0	2	0
77	GK	(Italy) ITA	Valerio Vimercati	30	0	30	0	0	0
79	DF	(Ukraine) UKR	Serhiy Vakulenko	27	1	25	1	2	0
81	DF	(Uruguay) URU	Diego Barboza	5	0	2+2	0	1	0
88	FW	(Ivory Coast) CIV	Wilfried Eza	32	8	15+15	8	2	0
Players away on loan:
4	DF	(Armenia) ARM	Albert Khachumyan	4	0	0+3	0	1	0
Players who left Ararat-Armenia during the season:
8	MF	(France) FRA	Yoan Gouffran	4	0	4	0	0	0
94	MF	(Moldova) MDA	Dan Spătaru	5	0	0+4	0	1	0
99	FW	(Armenia) ARM	Armen Hovhannisyan	3	0	0+2	0	0+1	0

=== Goal scorers ===
Place	Position	Nation	Number	Name	Premier League	Armenian Cup	Total
1	MF	(Cape Verde)	14	Mailson Lima	18	1	19
2	FW	(Nigeria)	24	Yusuf Otubanjo	9	1	10
3	FW	(Ivory Coast)	88	Wilfried Eza	8	0	8
4	FW	(Armenia)	18	Artyom Avanesyan	4	1	5
5	MF	(Colombia)	8	Jonathan Duarte	4	0	4
6	MF	(Armenia)	7	Zhirayr Shaghoyan	3	0	3
7	FW	(Burkina Faso)	17	Zakaria Sanogo	2	0	2
7	MF	(Russia)	10	Armen Ambartsumyan	2	0	2
9	MF	(Kenya)	20	Alwyn Tera	1	0	1
9	DF	(Brazil)	30	Romércio	1	0	1
9	DF	(Brazil)	2	Alemão	1	0	1
9	MF	(Netherlands)	27	Furdjel Narsingh	1	0	1
9	DF	(Ukraine)	79	Serhiy Vakulenko	1	0	1
9				Own goal	1	0	1
				TOTALS	56	3	59

=== Clean sheets ===
Place	Position	Nation	Number	Name	Premier League	Armenian Cup	Total
1	GK	(Italy)	77	Valerio Vimercati	15	0	15
2	GK	(Russia)	33	Dmitry Abakumov	2	0	2
				TOTALS	17	0	17

=== Disciplinary record ===
Number	Nation	Position	Name	Premier League		Armenian Cup		Total	
Number	Nation	Position	Name	Yellow card	Red card	Yellow card	Red card	Yellow card	Red card
2	(Brazil)	DF	Alemão	3	0	0	0	3	0
3	(Colombia)	DF	Junior Bueno	6	1	0	0	6	1
5	(Armenia)	DF	Davit Terteryan	6	1	1	0	7	1
6	(Armenia)	MF	Wbeymar	7	0	0	0	7	0
7	(Armenia)	MF	Zhirayr Shaghoyan	2	0	0	0	2	0
8	(Colombia)	MF	Jonathan Duarte	1	0	0	0	1	0
10	(Armenia)	MF	Armen Ambartsumyan	4	0	1	0	5	0
11	(Armenia)	MF	Yehor Klymenchuk	1	0	2	0	3	0
12	(Belgium)	DF	Thibaut Lesquoy	1	0	0	0	1	0
14	(Cape Verde)	MF	Mailson Lima	7	0	0	0	7	0
17	(Burkina Faso)	FW	Zakaria Sanogo	2	0	0	0	2	0
19	(Armenia)	MF	Karen Muradyan	3	0	0	0	3	0
20	(Kenya)	MF	Alwyn Tera	1	0	0	0	1	0
21	(Nigeria)	MF	Solomon Udo	2	0	0	0	2	0
24	(Nigeria)	FW	Yusuf Otubanjo	1	0	0	0	1	0
27	(Netherlands)	MF	Furdjel Narsingh	1	0	0	0	1	0
30	(Brazil)	DF	Romércio	5	1	0	0	5	1
77	(Italy)	GK	Valerio Vimercati	1	0	0	0	1	0
79	(Ukraine)	DF	Serhiy Vakulenko	1	0	0	0	1	0
88	(Ivory Coast)	FW	Wilfried Eza	1	0	0	0	1	0
Players away on loan:
4	(Armenia)	DF	Albert Khachumyan	2	0	0	0	2	0
Players who left Ararat-Armenia during the season:
94	(Moldova)	MF	Dan Spătaru	1	0	0	0	1	0
			TOTALS	59	3	4	0	63	3
