= Artyom Avanesyan =

Armenian footballer

Personal information
- Full name: Artyom Aregovich Avanesyan
- Date of birth: 17 July 1999 (age 27)
- Place of birth: Balashikha, Russia
- Height: 1.77 m (5 ft 10 in)
- Position: Midfielder

Team information
- Current team: Gandzasar
- Number: 18

Youth career
- 2013–2016: Prialit Reutov
- 2016: DYuSSh Olimp-SKOPA Balashikha
- 2016–2017: CSKA Moscow
- 2017: Zenit Penza

Senior career*
Years	Team	Apps	(Gls)
2018	Ararat Moscow	8	(1)
2018–2024	Ararat-Armenia	101	(7)
2020–2021	→ Pyunik (loan)	21	(2)
2024–2026	Noah	22	(1)
2026–	Gandzasar	0	(0)

International career^{‡}
2021–	Armenia	3	(0)
- * Club domestic league appearances and goals as of 28 July 2026 ‡ National team caps and goals as of 29 March 2022

Artyom Aregovich Avanesyan (Armenian: Արտյոմ Ավանեսյան; Russian: Артём Арегович Аванесян; born 17 July 1999) is a professional footballer who plays for Noah. Born in Russia, he plays for the Armenia national team.

== Club career ==
On 5 August 2020, Pyunik announced the season-long loan signing of Avanesyan from Ararat-Armenia.

On 3 June 2024, Ararat-Armenia announced the departure of Avanesyan after six seasons with the club.

On 18 June 2024, Noah announced the signing of Avanesyan. On 5 June 2026, Noah announced that Avanesyan had left the club.

On 27 July 2026, Gandzasar, announced the signing of Avanesyan on a contract until the summer of 2028, and that he would captain the club.

== International career ==
In August 2021, he was invited to represent the Armenia national football team. He made his debut on 5 September 2021 in a World Cup qualifier against Germany, a 0–6 away loss. He substituted Khoren Bayramyan in the 82nd minute.

== Career statistics ==
=== Club ===
As of match played 26 May 2024

Appearances and goals by club, season and competition
Club	Season	League			National Cup		Continental		Other		Total	
Club	Season	Division	Apps	Goals	Apps	Goals	Apps	Goals	Apps	Goals	Apps	Goals
Ararat Moscow	2017–18	Russian Professional Football League	8	1	0	0	–				8	1
Ararat-Armenia	2018–19	Armenian Premier League	10	0	4	0	–				14	0
Ararat-Armenia	2019–20	Armenian Premier League	5	0	2	5	0 (Note: Zero appearances in the UEFA Champions League & zero appearances in the UEFA Europa League)	0	0 (Note: Appearances in the Armenian Supercup)	0	7	5
Ararat-Armenia	2020–21	Armenian Premier League	0	0	0	0	0 (Note: Zero appearances in the UEFA Champions League & zero appearances in the UEFA Europa League)	0	0	0	7	5
Ararat-Armenia	2021–22	Armenian Premier League	31	4	2	1	–				33	5
Ararat-Armenia	2022–23	Armenian Premier League	30	1	2	0	2 (Note: Appearances in the UEFA Conference League)	0	–		34	1
Ararat-Armenia	2023–24	Armenian Premier League	25	1	2	0	4	0	–		31	1
Ararat-Armenia	Total		101	7	12	6	6	0	0	0	119	13
Pyunik (loan)	2020–21	Armenian Premier League	21	2	2	0	–				23	2
Noah	2024–25	Armenian Premier League	15	1	0	0	9	0	–		24	1
Noah	2025–26	Armenian Premier League	7	1	1	1	1 (Note: efn)	0	1	0	10	1
Noah	Total		22	1	1	1	10	0	1	0	34	2
Career total			152	10	15	7	16	0	1	0	184	17

=== International ===
As of match played 29 March 2022

Appearances and goals by national team and year
National team	Year	Apps	Goals
Armenia	2021	1	0
Armenia	2022	2	0
Total		3	0

== Honours ==
=== Club ===
Ararat-Armenia

- Armenian Premier League (2): 2018–19, 2019–20
- Armenian Supercup (1): 2019
- Armenian Cup (1): 2023–24

Noah

- Armenian Cup: 2025–26
- Armenian Supercup: 2025
