= Romércio =

Brazilian footballer

Personal information
- Full name: Romércio Pereira da Conceição
- Date of birth: 25 February 1997 (age 29)
- Place of birth: Santa Maria da Boa Vista, Brazil
- Height: 1.85 m (6 ft 1 in)
- Position: Centre back

Team information
- Current team: Inter de Limeira

Youth career
- 2015: Coritiba

Senior career*
Years	Team	Apps	(Gls)
2016–2020	Coritiba	40	(1)
2020–2021	→ Guarani (loan)	26	(2)
2021	Guarani	10	(0)
2021–2022	Remo	26	(1)
2022–2023	Ararat-Armenia	28	(2)
2023	São Bernardo	11	(0)
2023–2024	Juventude	10	(0)
2024–2025	Botafogo-SP	6	(0)
2025	Ararat-Armenia	4	(0)
2025–	Inter de Limeira	0	(0)
- * Club domestic league appearances and goals as of 4 June 2025

Romércio Pereira da Conceição (born 25 February 1997), simply known as Romércio, is a Brazilian professional footballer who plays as a central defender, for Inter de Limeira.

== Career ==
Romércio came through the youth ranks at Coritiba. He made senior debut for the club on 11 December 2016, the last game of the 2016 Campeonato Brasileiro Série A against Ponte Preta, when Coritiba had already released a number of first team players.

On 25 January 2022, Ararat-Armenia announced the signing of Romércio from Remo. On 19 January 2023, Ararat-Armenia announced that Romércio had left the club after his contract had expired.

On 14 January 2025, Romércio returned to Ararat-Armenia. On 4 June 2025, Ararat-Armenia announced the departure of Romércio after his contract had expired.

On 7 July 2025, Inter de Limeira announced the signing of Romércio.

== Career statistics ==
=== Club ===
As of match played 3 May 2025

Appearances and goals by club, season and competition
Club	Season	League			National Cup		Continental		Other		Total	
Club	Season	Division	Apps	Goals	Apps	Goals	Apps	Goals	Apps	Goals	Apps	Goals
Guarani (loan)	2020	Série B	15	1	0	0	0	0	11 (Note: Appearances and goals in the Campeonato Paulista)	1	26	2
Guarani	2021	Série B	10	0	0	0	0	0	0	0	10	0
Remo	2021	Série B	26	1	2 (Note: One appearance in the Copa do Brasil and One appearance in the Copa Verde)	0	0	0	0 (Note: Appearances in the Campeonato Paraense)	0	28	1
Ararat-Armenia	2021–22	Armenian Premier League	14	1	0	0	-		-		14	1
Ararat-Armenia	2022–23	Armenian Premier League	14	2	1	0	2 (Note: Appearances in the UEFA Europa Conference League)	0	-		17	2
Ararat-Armenia	Total		28	3	1	0	2	0	0	0	31	3
São Bernardo	2023	Série C	0	0	1	0	0	0	11	0	12	0
Juventude	2023	Série B	10	0	0	0	0	0	0 (Note: Appearances in the Campeonato Gaúcho)	0	10	0
Juventude	2024	Série A	0	0	0	0	0	0	0	0	0	0
Juventude	Total		10	0	0	0	0	0	0	0	10	0
Botafogo-SP	2024	Série C	6	0	0	0	0	0	0	0	6	0
Ararat-Armenia	2024–25	Armenian Premier League	4	0	1	0	0	0	-		5	0
Career total			99	5	5	0	2	0	22	1	128	6
