= Wilfried Eza =

Ivorian footballer

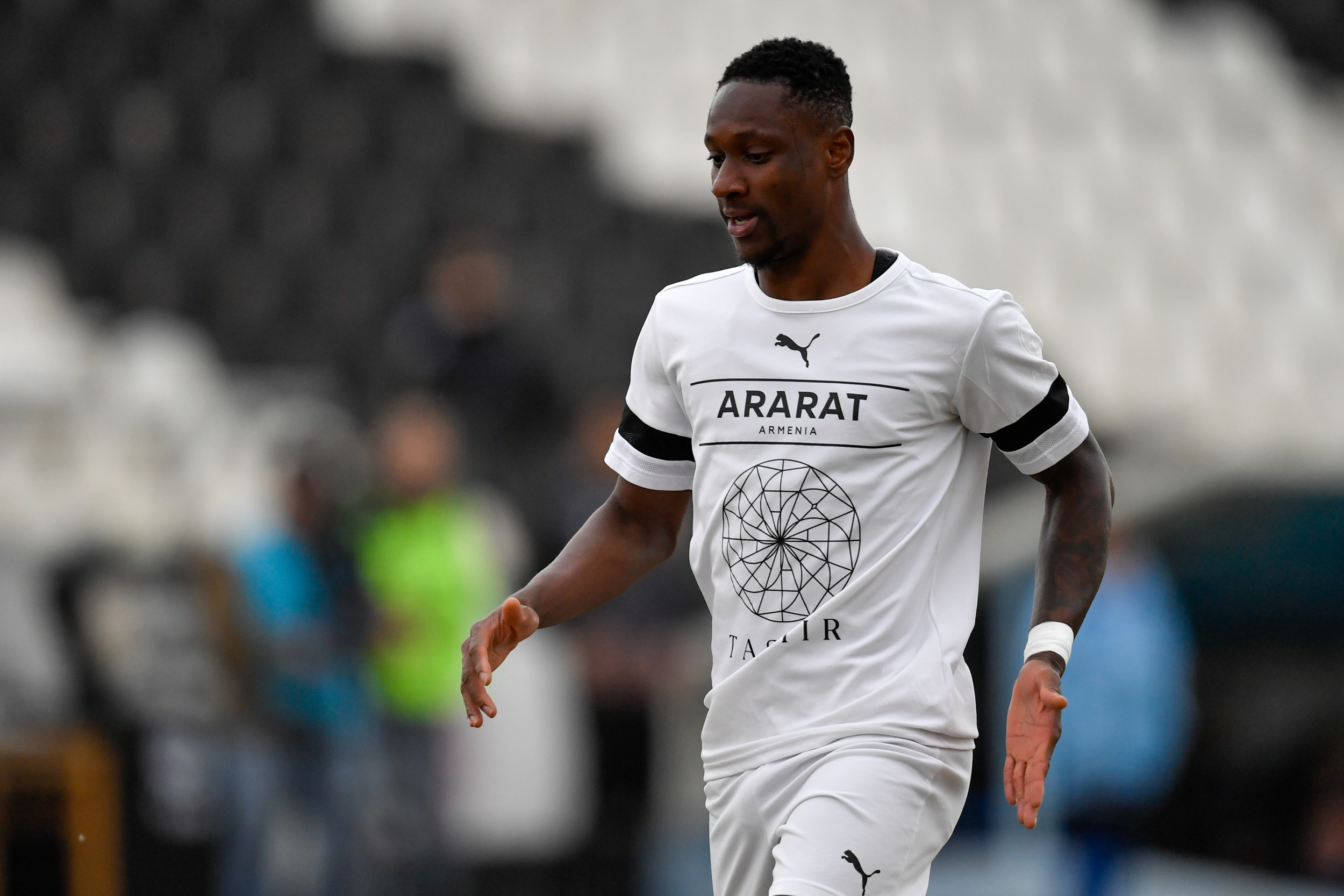
- Eza with Ararat-Armenia in 2023

Personal information
- Full name: Wilfried Kwassi Eza
- Date of birth: 28 December 1996 (age 29)
- Place of birth: Alépé, Ivory Coast
- Height: 1.81 m (5 ft 11 in)
- Position: Forward

Senior career*
Years	Team	Apps	(Gls)
2016–2017	Saxan Gagauz Yeri	16	(5)
2017–2018	Gomel	1	(0)
2019	Artsakh	11	(0)
2019–2021	Van	49	(40)
2021–2023	Ararat-Armenia	68	(22)
2023–2025	SV Ried	45	(23)
2025–2026	Chelyabinsk	25	(4)
2026	Al-Faisaly	1	(0)
- * Club domestic league appearances and goals as of 29 October 2026

Wilfried Kwassi Eza (born 28 December 1996) is an Ivorian professional footballer who most recently played for Jordanian Pro League club Al-Faisaly.

== Career ==
On 4 June 2021, Eza was one of 15 plays to leave FC Van at the end of the 2020–21, signing for Ararat-Armenia on 25 June 2021.

On 31 August 2023, Eza left Ararat-Armenia to sign for Austrian 2. Liga club SV Ried on a two-year contract with the option of a third.

On 15 July 2025, Russian First League club Chelyabinsk, announced the signing of Eza to a two-year contract after his SV Ried contract had expired.

On 23 August 2026, Eza signed for Jordanian Pro League club Al-Faisaly. A couple of weeks later, in early September 2026, Eza injured his Anterior cruciate ligament and agreed to terminate his contract with the club after he was ruled out for several months.

== Career statistics ==
=== Club ===
As of match played 16 May 2026

Appearances and goals by club, season and competition
Club	Season	League			National Cup		Continental		Total	
Club	Season	Division	Apps	Goals	Apps	Goals	Apps	Goals	Apps	Goals
Saxan Gagauz Yeri	2016–17	Divizia Națională	16	5	1	0	–		17	5
Gomel	2018	Belarusian Premier League	1	0	2	0	–		3	0
Artsakh	2018–19	Armenian Premier League	11	0	0	0	–		11	0
Van	2019–20	Armenian First League	27	32	3	1	–		30	33
Van	2020–21	Armenian Premier League	22	8	4	0	–		26	8
Van	Total		49	40	7	1	0	0	56	41
Ararat-Armenia	2021–22	Armenian Premier League	30	8	2	0	–		32	8
Ararat-Armenia	2022–23	Armenian Premier League	34	13	2	3	1 (Note: Appearances in the UEFA Conference League)	0	37	16
Ararat-Armenia	2023–24	Armenian Premier League	4	1	0	0	4	2	8	3
Ararat-Armenia	Total		68	22	4	3	5	2	77	27
SV Ried	2023–24	2. Liga	20	11	1	0	–		21	11
SV Ried	2024–25	2. Liga	25	12	1	0	–		26	12
SV Ried	Total		45	23	2	0	0	0	47	23
Chelyabinsk	2025–26	Russian First League	25	4	0	0	–		25	4
Career total			215	94	16	4	5	2	236	100
