= Alemão (footballer, born 1992) =

Brazilian footballer

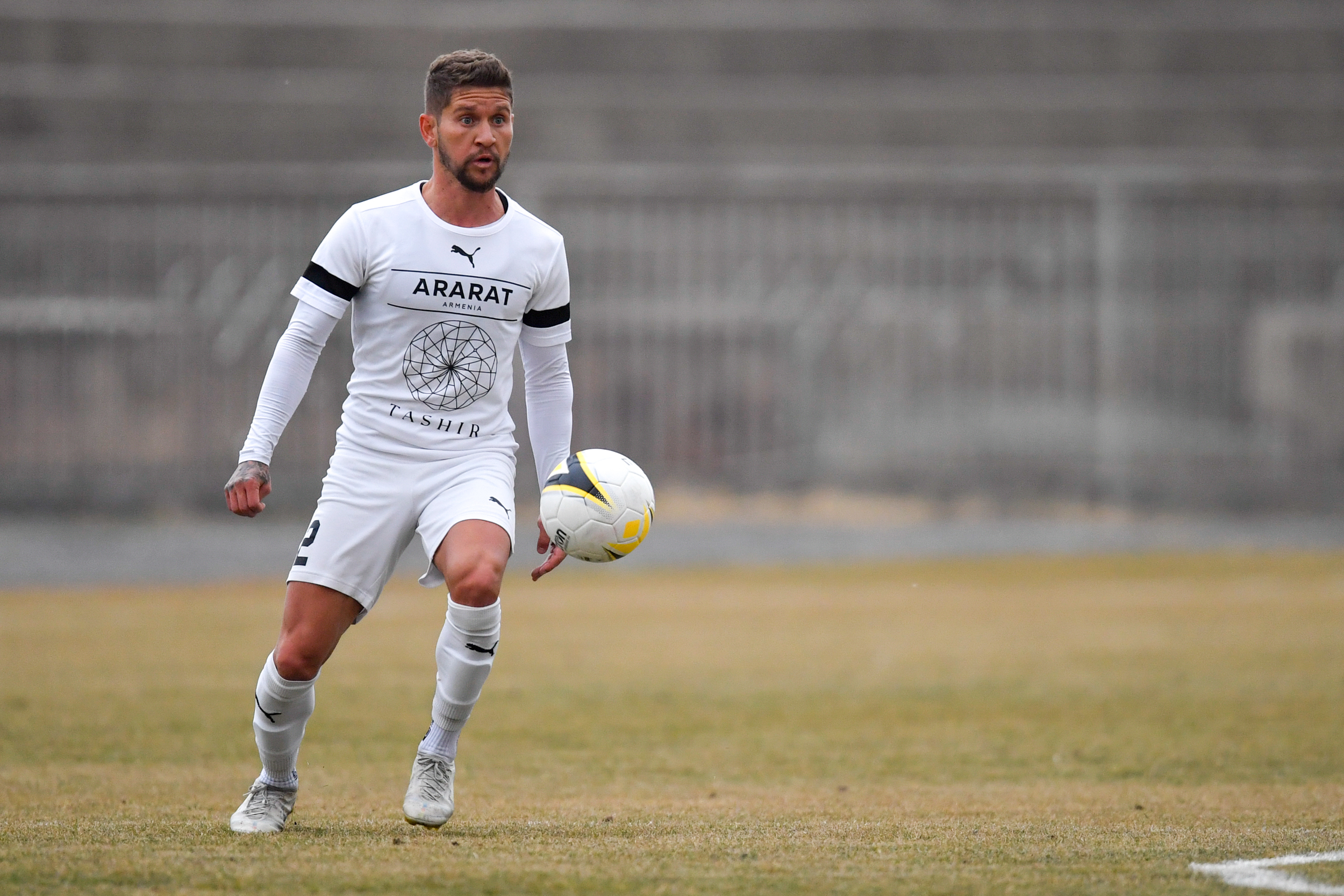
- Alemão in 2023

Personal information
- Full name: Guilherme António de Souza
- Date of birth: 7 December 1992 (age 33)
- Place of birth: Morro Agudo, Brazil
- Height: 1.70 m (5 ft 7 in)
- Position: Defender

Youth career
- 2009–2010: São Carlos

Senior career*
Years	Team	Apps	(Gls)
2011–2013	Tourizense	46	(5)
2013–2014	Marítimo B	21	(0)
2013–2014	Marítimo	1	(0)
2014–2016	Leixões	72	(3)
2016–2020	UD Oliveirense	110	(5)
2020–2024	Ararat-Armenia	97	(8)
2024–2026	Pyunik	42	(1)
2026–	Amarante	2	(0)
- * Club domestic league appearances and goals as of 29 August 2026

Guilherme António de Souza, known as Alemão (born 7 December 1992) is a Brazilian professional footballer who plays as a defender, most recently for Liga Portugal 2 club Amarante.

== Club career ==
=== Tourizense ===
Alemão made his league debut for Tourizense against Pinhalnovense on 4 September 2011. He scored his first goal for the club against Estrela Vendas Novas on 11 December 2011, scoring in the 16th minute.

=== Marítimo ===
Alemão made his professional debut in the Segunda Liga for Marítimo B on 31 August 2013 in a game against Feirense.

Alemão made his Primeira Liga debut for Marítimo on 4 May 2014 as a late substitute in a 1–1 draw against Braga.

=== Leixões ===
Alemão made his league debut for Leixões against Olhanense on 9 August 2014. He scored his first goal for the club against Benfica B on 1 February 2015, scoring in the 82nd minute.

=== Oliveirense ===
Alemão made his league debut for Oliveirense against Sousense on 21 August 2016. He scored his first goal for the club against Estarreja on 6 November 2016, scoring in the 46th minute.

=== Ararat-Armenia ===
On 23 July 2020, Ararat-Armenia announced the signing of Alemão. He made his league debut for the club against Ararat on 25 February 2021. Alemão scored his first league goal for the club against Ararat on 15 April 2022, scoring in the 27th minute.

On 1 June 2024, Ararat-Armenia announced that Alemão had left the club after his contract had expired.

=== Pyunik ===
On 7 July 2024, Armenian Premier League club Pyunik announced the signing of Alemão. On 8 June 2026, Pyunik announced that Alemão had left the club after his contract had expired.

== Career statistics ==
=== Club ===
As of match played 27 May 2026

Appearances and goals by club, season and competition
Club	Season	League			National Cup		League Cup		Continental		Other		Total	
Club	Season	Division	Apps	Goals	Apps	Goals	Apps	Goals	Apps	Goals	Apps	Goals	Apps	Goals
Oliveirense	2016–17	Campeonato de Portugal	32	4	0	0	-		-		-		32	4
Oliveirense	2017–18	LigaPro	35	0	0	0	5	0	-		-		40	0
Oliveirense	2018–19	LigaPro	23	1	0	0	1	0	-		-		24	1
Oliveirense	2019–20	LigaPro	20	0	0	0	2	0	-		-		22	0
Oliveirense	Total		110	5	0	0	8	0	-	-	-	-	118	5
Ararat-Armenia	2020–21	Armenian Premier League	14	0	3	0	-		4 (Note: One appearance in the UEFA Champions League & three appearances in the UEFA Europa League)	0	1 (Note: Appearances in the Armenian Supercup)	0	22	0
Ararat-Armenia	2021–22	Armenian Premier League	30	1	2	0	-		-		-		32	1
Ararat-Armenia	2022–23	Armenian Premier League	24	5	2	0	-		2 (Note: Appearances in the UEFA Europa Conference League)	0	-		28	5
Ararat-Armenia	2023–24	Armenian Premier League	29	2	4	1	-		4	1	-		37	4
Ararat-Armenia	Total		97	8	11	1	-	-	10	1	1	0	119	10
Pyunik	2024–25	Armenian Premier League	23	0	2	0	-		8 (Note: Two appearances in the UEFA Champions League, six appearances in the UEFA Conference League)	0	1	0	34	0
Pyunik	2025–26	Armenian Premier League	19	1	1	0	-		4	0	-		24	1
Pyunik	Total		42	1	3	0	-	-	12	0	1	0	58	1
Career total			249	14	14	1	9	0	22	1	2	0	296	16
