= Dmitry Abakumov =

Russian footballer

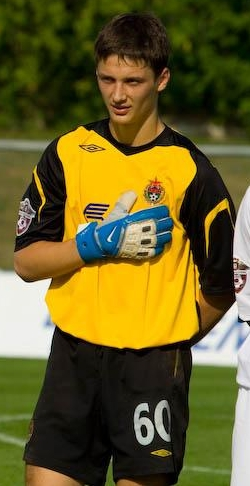

Personal information
- Full name: Dmitry Nikolayevich Abakumov
- Date of birth: 8 July 1989 (age 37)
- Place of birth: Voronezh, Soviet Union
- Height: 1.84 m (6 ft 1/2 in)
- Position: Goalkeeper

Youth career
- Fakel Voronezh

Senior career*
Years	Team	Apps	(Gls)
2007–2008	CSKA Moscow	0	(0)
2009–2012	KAMAZ Naberezhnye Chelny	35	(0)
2012–2013	Mordovia Saransk	15	(0)
2014–2017	Orenburg	85	(0)
2018	Luch Vladivostok	8	(0)
2018–2023	Ararat-Armenia	68	(0)
2023–2024	Urartu	8	(0)

International career
2005	Russia U-16	14	(0)
2006	Russia U-17	6	(0)
2007	Russia U-18	4	(0)
2008	Russia U-19	1	(0)
- * Club domestic league appearances and goals as of 24 May 2024

Dmitry Nikolayevich Abakumov (Russian: Дми́трий Никола́евич Абаку́мов; born 8 July 1989) is a Russian professional association football player.

== Career ==
Abakumov made his professional debut on 30 April 2009 in a Russian First Division game for FC KAMAZ Naberezhnye Chelny against FC Vityaz Podolsk.

On 28 June 2012, Abakumov signed a two-year contract with Russian Premier League club Mordovia Saransk.

In 2014, Abakumov played for FNL side Gazovik Orenburg.

On 13 December 2017, Abakumov left FC Orenburg by mutual consent.

In June 2018, Abakumov joined Armenian Premier League club Ararat-Armenia. On 28 June 2023, Ararat-Armenia announced that Abakumov had left the club, with Urartu announcing his signing the same day.

== Career statistics ==
=== Club ===
As of match played 26 November 2022

Appearances and goals by club, season and competition
Club	Season	League			National Cup		Continental		Other		Total	
Club	Season	Division	Apps	Goals	Apps	Goals	Apps	Goals	Apps	Goals	Apps	Goals
CSKA Moscow	2008	Russian FNL	0	0	0	0	0 (Note: Appearances in the UEFA Cup)	0	—		0	0
KAMAZ	2009	Russian FNL	1	0	0	0	-		-		0	0
KAMAZ	2010	Russian FNL	13	0	0	0	-		-		0	0
KAMAZ	2011–12	Russian FNL	21	0	0	0	-		-		0	0
KAMAZ	Total		35	0	0	0	-	-	-	-	35	0
Mordovia Saransk	2012–13	Russian Premier League	10	0	2	0	-		-		12	0
Mordovia Saransk	2013–14	Russian FNL	5	0	0	0	-		-		5	0
Mordovia Saransk	Total		15	0	2	0	-	-	-	-	17	0
Orenburg	2013–14	Russian FNL	11	0	0	0	-		-		11	0
Orenburg	2014–15	Russian FNL	33	0	5	0	-		-		38	0
Orenburg	2015–16	Russian FNL	31	0	1	0	-		-		32	0
Orenburg	2016–17	Russian Premier League	6	0	0	0	-		0 (Note: Appearances in the Relegation play-offs)	0	6	0
Orenburg	2017–18	Russian FNL	4	0	0	0	-		-		4	0
Orenburg	Total		85	0	6	0	-	-	0	0	91	0
Luch Vladivostok	2017–18	Russian FNL	8	0	0	0	-		-		8	0
Ararat-Armenia	2018–19	Armenian Premier League	28	0	3	0	-		-		31	0
Ararat-Armenia	2019–20	Armenian Premier League	22	0	2	0	5 (Note: Two appearances in the UEFA Champions League & three appearances in the UEFA Europa League)	0	0 (Note: Appearances in the Armenian Supercup)	0	29	0
Ararat-Armenia	2020–21	Armenian Premier League	15	0	4	0	0 (Note: Zero appearances in the UEFA Champions League & zero appearances in the UEFA Europa League)	0	0	0	19	0
Ararat-Armenia	2021–22	Armenian Premier League	3	0	2	0	-		-		5	0
Ararat-Armenia	2022–23	Armenian Premier League	0	0	1	0	-		-		1	0
Ararat-Armenia	Total		68	0	12	0	5	0	0	0	85	0
Career total			186	0	16	0	5	0	0	0	217	0

== Honours ==
=== Club ===
Ararat-Armenia

- Armenian Premier League (2): 2018–19, 2019–20
- Armenian Supercup (1): 2019
