= Davit Terteryan =

Armenian footballer

Personal information
- Date of birth: 17 December 1997 (age 28)
- Place of birth: Yerevan, Armenia
- Height: 1.78 m (5 ft 10 in)
- Position: Right-back

Team information
- Current team: Alashkert
- Number: 5

Youth career
- –2014: Pyunik

Senior career*
Years	Team	Apps	(Gls)
2014–2017	Pyunik II		
2017–2018	Pyunik	9	(0)
2018–2021	Gandzasar Kapan	47	(0)
2021–2024	Ararat-Armenia	69	(0)
2024–2025	Van	27	(2)
2025–	Alashkert	23	(1)

International career^{‡}
2013	Armenia U17	3	(0)
2018	Armenia U21	2	(0)
2021–	Armenia	12	(0)
- * Club domestic league appearances and goals as of 18 June 2026 ‡ National team caps and goals as of 2 October 2026 (UTC)

Davit Terteryan (Armenian: Դավիթ Տերտերյան; born 17 December 1997) is an Armenian professional footballer who plays as a right-back for Alashkert and the Armenia national team.

== Career ==
=== Club ===
On 22 January 2021 Terteryan signed for FC Ararat-Armenia.

=== International ===
Terteryan made his international debut for Armenia on 1 June 2021 in a friendly match against Croatia, coming on as a substitute in the 79th minute for Artak Grigoryan. The away match finished as a 1–1 draw.

== Career statistics ==
=== Club ===
As of match played 1 June 2023

Appearances and goals by club, season and competition
Club	Season	League			National Cup		Continental		Other		Total	
Club	Season	Division	Apps	Goals	Apps	Goals	Apps	Goals	Apps	Goals	Apps	Goals
Pyunik	2017–18	Armenian Premier League	9	0	1	0	—		—		10	0
Gandzasar Kapan	2017–18	Armenian Premier League	12	0	1	0	—		—		10	0
Gandzasar Kapan	2018–19	Armenian Premier League	16	0	1	0	—		—		10	0
Gandzasar Kapan	2019–20	Armenian Premier League	12	0	4	0	—		—		10	0
Gandzasar Kapan	2020–21	Armenian Premier League	7	0	1	0	—		—		10	0
Gandzasar Kapan	Total		47	0	7	0	-	-	-	-	54	0
Ararat-Armenia	2020–21	Armenian Premier League	13	0	3	1	0 (Note: Zero appearances in the UEFA Champions League, zero appearances in the UEFA Europa League)	0	0 (Note: Appearances in the Armenian Supercup)	0	16	1
Ararat-Armenia	2021–22	Armenian Premier League	27	0	1	0	—		—		28	0
Ararat-Armenia	2022–23	Armenian Premier League	19	0	1	0	0 (Note: Appearances in the UEFA Europa Conference League)	0	—		20	0
Ararat-Armenia	Total		59	0	5	1	0	0	0	0	64	1
Career total			115	0	13	1	0	0	0	0	128	1

=== International ===
As of 2 October 2026

Armenia
Year	Apps	Goals
2021	8	0
2022	3	0
2026	1	0
Total	12	0
