= Dragan Lovrić =

Croatian footballer (born 1996)

Personal information
- Date of birth: 3 January 1996 (age 30)
- Place of birth: Split, Croatia
- Height: 1.91 m (6 ft 3 in)
- Position: Defender

Youth career
- –2010: Omladinac Vranjic
- 2010–2011: Adriatic Split
- 2011–2013: RNK Split
- 2013–2014: Gorica
- 2014–2015: Catania
- 2016: → Empoli (loan)

Senior career*
Years	Team	Apps	(Gls)
2015–2019	Catania	5	(0)
2015–2016	→ Akragas (loan)	3	(0)
2016–2017	→ Šibenik (loan)	1	(0)
2018	→ Alessandria (loan)	5	(0)
2020	Dugopolje	3	(0)
2020	Zrinjski Mostar	0	(0)
2020–2021	Mura	21	(0)
2021–2023	Kryvbas Kryvyi Rih	14	(1)
2023	Ararat-Armenia	9	(0)
2023–2024	Oțelul Galați	22	(0)
2024–2025	Gloria Buzău	9	(0)

International career
2015	Croatia U20	1	(0)
- * Club domestic league appearances and goals as of 16 December 2024

Dragan Lovrić (born 3 January 1996) is a Croatian professional footballer who plays as a defender.

== Club career ==
As a youth player, Lovrić joined the youth academy of Italian Serie A side Catania.

In 2015, he was sent on loan to Akragas in the Italian third division.

In 2016, he was sent on loan to Croatian top flight club Šibenik.

Before the second half of 2019/20, Lovrić signed for Dugopolje in the Croatian second division.

In 2020, he signed for Slovenian team Mura from Zrinjski in Bosnia and Herzegovina.

On 25 February 2023, Ararat-Armenia announced the signing of Croatian defender Lovrić from Kryvbas Kryvyi Rih. Lovrić left Ararat-Armenia at the end of his contract on 15 June 2023.

On 17 July 2023, Oțelul Galați announced the signing of Lovrić. He signed a contract for one year, with the possibility of extending the deal.

== Honours ==
Alessandria

- Coppa Italia Serie C: 2017–18

Mura

- Slovenian PrvaLiga: 2020–21

Oțelul Galați

- Cupa României runner-up: 2023–24
