= Thibaut Lesquoy =

Belgian footballer (born 1995)

Personal information
- Date of birth: 7 July 1995 (age 31)
- Place of birth: Saint-Mard, Belgium
- Height: 1.71 m (5 ft 7 in)
- Position: Left-back

Team information
- Current team: Racing Union
- Number: 12

Youth career
- 2005–2013: Virton

Senior career*
Years	Team	Apps	(Gls)
2013–2019	Virton	88	(2)
2019–2020	F91 Dudelange	14	(0)
2020–2022	Almere City	39	(0)
2022	Ararat-Armenia	6	(0)
2022–2023	Willem II	9	(0)
2023–2025	Virton	65	(0)
2025–	Racing Union	17	(0)
- * Club domestic league appearances and goals as of 13 June 2026

Thibaut Lesquoy (born 7 July 1995) is a Belgian professional footballer who plays as a left-back for Luxembourg National Division club Racing Union.

== Club career ==
=== Virton ===
Born in Saint-Mard, a village nearby Virton, Lesquoy began his career at the main club of the city, RE Virton, where he made his first-team debut on 28 February 2014 in the Belgian Second Division matchup against Eendracht Aalst which ended in a 3–0 loss. He was in the starting lineup but was sent off in the 55th minute. In the 2015–16 season, he was a regular starter for Virton. In that season, this club relegated from professional football, as the second tier in Belgium was reduced from seventeen to eight clubs. Because of this, Lesquoy played for three more years in the third-tier Belgian National Division 1, where Virton was able to win promotion in the 2018–19 season.

=== F91 Dudelange ===
After achieving promotion, Lesquoy moved to F91 Dudelange, the defending champions of the Luxembourg National Division. He made his European debut at the club, as he appeared in the UEFA Europa League against APOEL, Sevilla and Qarabağ.

=== Almere City ===
In 2020, Lesquoy signed a two-year contract with Dutch Eerste Divisie club Almere City FC as a free agent. He made his debut for the club on 30 August in a 0–0 home draw against MVV, starting at left back and playing the entire match. In the following match, a 6–4 shootout win over Excelsior, Lesquoy provided an assist to Thomas Verheydt for the opening goal. He suffered a foot injury in September, which sidelined him for a month. He made his return to the pitch in a 7–2 loss to fellow Eerste Divisie title contenders SC Cambuur on 15 November, coming on as a halftime substitute for Delvechio Blackson.

=== Ararat-Armenia ===
Lesquoy signed for Armenian Premier League club Ararat-Armenia on 28 January 2022 on a six-month contract.

=== Willem II ===
On 19 June 2022, Willem II announced the signing of Lesquoy to a two-contract. He made his competitive debut for the club on 19 August, starting at left-back in a 2–1 home win against Telstar.

=== Return to Virton ===
On 31 January 2023, Lesquoy returned to Virton.
