= Diego Barboza =

Uruguayan footballer (born 1991)

Personal information
- Full name: Diego Martín Barboza González
- Date of birth: 9 January 1991 (age 35)
- Place of birth: Montevideo, Uruguay
- Height: 1.82 m (5 ft 11 1/2 in)
- Position: Defender

Team information
- Current team: Budoni

Youth career
- Nacional

Senior career*
Years	Team	Apps	(Gls)
2012–2014	Nacional B	0	(0)
2012–2023	→ Rentistas (loan)	7	(1)
2013–2014	→ Rampla Juniors (loan)	14	(0)
2014–2015	Rampla Juniors	13	(0)
2016	Huracán	4	(1)
2016–2017	Montevideo Wanderers	23	(1)
2017–2019	UAT	26	(0)
2019	Montevideo Wanderers	23	(1)
2020–2021	Enosis Neon Paralimni	44	(1)
2021–2022	Ararat-Armenia	4	(0)
2022–2023	Novelda		
2023	Manfredonia	6	(0)
2023–	Budoni	2	(0)
- * Club domestic league appearances and goals as of 20 December 2023

Diego Martín Barboza González (born 9 January 1991) is a Uruguayan footballer who plays as a defender for Italian Serie D club Budoni.

== Career ==
On 5 August 2021, Ararat-Armenia announced the signing of Barboza from Enosis Neon Paralimni.
