= 2017 FIFA U-17 World Cup squads =

The following is a list of all the squads of the national teams that participated in the 2017 FIFA U-17 World Cup.

Each team had to name a squad of 21 players (three of whom had to be goalkeepers) by the FIFA deadline.

All players of its representative team must have been born on or after 1 January 2000.

Those marked in bold have been capped at full international level.

== Group A ==
=== India ===
Head coach: (Portugal) Luís Norton de Matos

No.	Pos.	Player	Date of birth (age)	Club
1	GK	Dheeraj Singh Moirangthem	4 July 2000 (aged 17)	(All India Football Federation) AIFF Elite Academy
2	DF	Boris Singh Thangjam	3 January 2000 (aged 17)	(All India Football Federation) AIFF Elite Academy
3	DF	Jitendra Singh	13 June 2001 (aged 16)	(All India Football Federation) AIFF Elite Academy
4	DF	**Anwar Ali**	28 August 2000 (aged 17)	(All India Football Federation) Minerva Punjab
5	DF	Sanjeev Stalin	17 January 2001 (aged 16)	(All India Football Federation) AIFF Elite Academy
6	MF	**Suresh Singh Wangjam**	7 August 2000 (aged 17)	(All India Football Federation) AIFF Elite Academy
7	MF	Ninthoinganba Meetei	13 July 2001 (aged 16)	(All India Football Federation) AIFF Elite Academy
8	MF	**Amarjit Singh Kiyam**	6 January 2001 (aged 16)	(All India Football Federation) AIFF Elite Academy
9	FW	**Aniket Jadhav**	13 July 2000 (aged 17)	(All India Football Federation) AIFF Elite Academy
10	MF	Abhijit Sarkar	5 January 2000 (aged 17)	(All India Football Federation) AIFF Elite Academy
11	MF	Komal Thatal	18 September 2000 (aged 17)	(All India Football Federation) AIFF Elite Academy
12	DF	Hendry Antonay	22 May 2000 (aged 17)	(All India Football Federation) AIFF Elite Academy
13	MF	**Lalengmawia**	17 October 2000 (aged 16)	(All India Football Federation) AIFF Elite Academy
14	FW	**Rahim Ali**	21 April 2000 (aged 17)	(All India Football Federation) AIFF Elite Academy
15	MF	**Jeakson Singh Thounaojam**	21 June 2001 (aged 16)	(All India Football Federation) Minerva Punjab
16	MF	Nongdamba Naorem	2 January 2000 (aged 17)	(All India Football Federation) Minerva Punjab
17	MF	**Rahul Kannoly Praveen**	16 March 2000 (aged 17)	(All India Football Federation) AIFF Elite Academy
18	DF	Namit Deshpande	9 June 2000 (aged 17)	(United States Soccer Federation) FC Delco
19	MF	Mohammad Shahjahan	3 October 2000 (aged 17)	(All India Football Federation) Minerva Punjab
20	GK	Prabhsukhan Singh Gill	2 January 2001 (aged 16)	(All India Football Federation) AIFF Elite Academy
21	GK	Sunny Dhaliwal	30 January 2000 (aged 17)	(Canadian Soccer Association) Toronto FC

=== United States ===
Head coach: (United States) John Hackworth

No.	Pos.	Player	Date of birth (age)	Club
1	GK	Justin Garces	23 August 2000 (aged 17)	(United States Soccer Federation) Atlanta United FC
2	DF	Jaylin Lindsey	27 March 2000 (aged 17)	(United States Soccer Federation) Sporting Kansas City
3	DF	Chris Gloster	28 July 2000 (aged 17)	(United States Soccer Federation) New York Red Bulls
4	DF	**James Sands**	6 July 2000 (aged 17)	(United States Soccer Federation) New York City FC
5	DF	Tyler Shaver	13 May 2000 (aged 17)	(United States Soccer Federation) New York City FC
6	DF	Chris Durkin	8 February 2000 (aged 17)	(United States Soccer Federation) D.C. United
7	FW	**Ayo Akinola**	20 January 2000 (aged 17)	(Canadian Soccer Association) Toronto FC II
8	MF	Blaine Ferri	29 September 2000 (aged 17)	(United States Soccer Federation) Solar Chelsea SC
9	FW	**Josh Sargent**	20 February 2000 (aged 17)	(United States Soccer Federation) St. Louis Scott Gallagher
10	FW	**Timothy Weah**	22 February 2000 (aged 17)	(French Football Federation) Paris Saint-Germain
11	MF	Andrew Carleton	22 June 2000 (aged 17)	(United States Soccer Federation) Atlanta United FC
12	GK	**CJ dos Santos**	24 August 2000 (aged 17)	(Portuguese Football Federation) Benfica
13	DF	**Sergiño Dest**	3 November 2000 (aged 16)	(Royal Dutch Football Association) Ajax
14	DF	Akil Watts	4 February 2000 (aged 17)	(United States Soccer Federation) Portland Timbers
15	MF	George Acosta	19 January 2000 (aged 17)	(United States Soccer Federation) North Carolina FC
16	MF	**Taylor Booth**	31 May 2001 (aged 16)	(United States Soccer Federation) Real Salt Lake
17	FW	**Bryan Reynolds**	28 June 2001 (aged 16)	(United States Soccer Federation) FC Dallas
18	MF	Indiana Vassilev	16 February 2001 (aged 16)	(United States Soccer Federation) IMG Academy
19	FW	Jacobo Reyes	11 August 2000 (aged 17)	(Mexican Football Federation) Monterrey
20	MF	Chris Goslin	12 May 2000 (aged 17)	(United States Soccer Federation) Atlanta United FC
21	GK	Alexander Budnik	4 February 2000 (aged 17)	(United States Soccer Federation) Sockers FC

=== Colombia ===
Colombia named their squad on 15 September 2017.

Head coach: (Colombia) Orlando Restrepo

No.	Pos.	Player	Date of birth (age)	Club
1	GK	Nicolás Gómez Londoño	16 August 2000 (aged 17)	(Colombian Football Federation) Deportivo Cali
2	DF	Andrés Balanta	18 January 2000 (aged 17)	(Colombian Football Federation) Deportivo Cali
3	DF	Guillermo Tegue	6 February 2000 (aged 17)	(Colombian Football Federation) Estudiantil
4	DF	Christian Andrade	8 April 2000 (aged 17)	(Colombian Football Federation) Millonarios
5	DF	Thomas Gutiérrez	1 March 2000 (aged 17)	(Colombian Football Federation) Estudiantil
6	MF	**Andrés Perea**	14 November 2000 (aged 16)	(Colombian Football Federation) Atlético Nacional
7	MF	**Jaminton Campaz**	24 May 2000 (aged 17)	(Colombian Football Federation) Deportes Tolima
8	FW	Luis Miguel López	8 November 2000 (aged 16)	(Colombian Football Federation) Santa Fe
9	FW	Santiago Barrero	26 February 2000 (aged 17)	(Colombian Football Federation) Atlético Rionegro 2010
10	MF	Brayan Gómez	29 January 2000 (aged 17)	(Colombian Football Federation) Atlético Nacional
11	FW	Juan Peñaloza	3 May 2000 (aged 17)	(Colombian Football Federation) Estudiantil
12	GK	**Kevin Mier**	18 May 2000 (aged 17)	(Colombian Football Federation) Atlético Nacional
13	DF	Robert Mejía	6 October 2000 (aged 17)	(Colombian Football Federation) Universitario Popayán
14	MF	Yadir Meneses	1 April 2000 (aged 17)	(Colombian Football Federation) Envigado
15	MF	Gustavo Carvajal	17 June 2000 (aged 17)	(Colombian Football Federation) América de Cali
16	MF	Fabián Ángel	10 January 2001 (aged 16)	(Colombian Football Federation) Barranquilla
17	FW	Déiber Caicedo	25 March 2000 (aged 17)	(Colombian Football Federation) Deportivo Cali
18	FW	Deyman Cortés	29 July 2000 (aged 17)	(Colombian Football Federation) Atlético Huila
19	FW	Juan David Vidal	16 September 2000 (aged 17)	(Colombian Football Federation) Barranquilla
20	MF	Etilso Martínez	12 May 2000 (aged 17)	(Colombian Football Federation) Atlético Rionegro 2010
21	GK	Daniel Melo Cabarcas	25 April 2001 (aged 16)	(Colombian Football Federation) Udinese School

=== Ghana ===
Ghana named their squad on 21 September 2017.

Head coach: (Ghana) Paa Kwesi Fabin

No.	Pos.	Player	Date of birth (age)	Club
1	GK	**Ibrahim Danlad**	2 December 2002 (aged 14)	(Ghana Football Association) Asante Kotoko
2	DF	John Otu	12 April 2000 (aged 17)	(Ghana Football Association) Dreams F.C.
3	DF	Gideon Acquah	24 May 2000 (aged 17)	(Ghana Football Association) Bofoakwa Tano
4	DF	Edmund Arko-Mensah	9 September 2001 (aged 16)	(Ghana Football Association) Wa All Stars
5	DF	**Najeeb Yakubu**	1 May 2000 (aged 17)	(Ghana Football Association) New Town Youth
6	FW	Eric Ayiah	6 March 2000 (aged 17)	(Ghana Football Association) Charity Stars
7	MF	Ibrahim Sulley	6 July 2001 (aged 16)	(Ghana Football Association) New Life F.C.
8	MF	**Mohammed Kudus**	2 August 2000 (aged 17)	(Ghana Football Association) Right to Dream
9	FW	Richard Danso	16 September 2000 (aged 17)	(Ghana Football Association) WAFA
10	MF	Emmanuel Toku	10 July 2000 (aged 17)	(Ghana Football Association) Cheetah F.C.
11	FW	Mohammed Aminu	10 August 2000 (aged 17)	(Ghana Football Association) WAFA
12	DF	Abdul Razak Yusif	9 August 2001 (aged 16)	(Ghana Football Association) Koforidua Youth
13	MF	Gabriel Leveh	1 April 2000 (aged 17)	(Ghana Football Association) Tema Youth
14	DF	Bismark Terry Owusu	31 October 2000 (aged 16)	(Ghana Football Association) Mandela Soccer Academy
15	DF	Gideon Mensah	9 October 2000 (aged 16)	(Ghana Football Association) Right to Dream
16	GK	Kwame Aziz	15 June 2002 (aged 15)	(Ghana Football Association) Mandela Soccer Academy
17	DF	Rashid Alhassan	20 June 2000 (aged 17)	(Ghana Football Association) Aduana Stars
18	MF	Mohammed Iddriss	26 July 2000 (aged 17)	(Ghana Football Association) Cheetah F.C.
19	MF	Ibrahim Sadiq	7 May 2000 (aged 17)	(Ghana Football Association) Right to Dream
20	MF	Isaac Gyamfi	9 September 2000 (aged 17)	(Ghana Football Association) New Life F.C.
21	GK	Michael Acquaye	10 August 2000 (aged 17)	(Ghana Football Association) WAFA

== Group B ==
=== Paraguay ===
Head coach: (Paraguay) Gustavo Morínigo

No.	Pos.	Player	Date of birth (age)	Club
1	GK	Diego Huesca	8 August 2000 (aged 17)	(Royal Spanish Football Federation) Valencia
2	DF	Jesus Rolon	4 July 2000 (aged 17)	(Paraguayan Football Association) Olimpia
3	DF	Roberto Fernández	7 June 2000 (aged 17)	(Paraguayan Football Association) Guaraní
4	DF	Pedro Alvarez Benitez	10 February 2001 (aged 16)	(Paraguayan Football Association) Cerro Porteño
5	DF	Alexis Duarte	12 March 2000 (aged 17)	(Paraguayan Football Association) Cerro Porteño
6	MF	**Braian Ojeda**	27 June 2000 (aged 17)	(Paraguayan Football Association) Olimpia
7	FW	Antonio Galeano	22 March 2000 (aged 17)	(Paraguayan Football Association) Rubio Ñu
8	MF	Stevens Gómez	8 January 2000 (aged 17)	(Paraguayan Football Association) Cerro Porteño
9	FW	Fernando Romero	24 April 2000 (aged 17)	(Paraguayan Football Association) Nacional
10	MF	Julio Baez	13 January 2000 (aged 17)	(Paraguayan Football Association) Cerro Porteño
11	FW	Martín Sánchez	27 January 2000 (aged 17)	(Paraguayan Football Association) Olimpia
12	GK	Angel Roa	8 February 2000 (aged 17)	(Paraguayan Football Association) Olimpia
13	DF	Marcelo Rolón Bell	19 February 2000 (aged 17)	(Paraguayan Football Association) Libertad
14	MF	Víctor Villasanti	29 March 2000 (aged 17)	(Paraguayan Football Association) Guaraní
15	DF	**Luis Zárate**	25 February 2000 (aged 17)	(Paraguayan Football Association) Libertad
16	FW	Aníbal Vega	18 March 2000 (aged 17)	(Brazilian Football Confederation) Palmeiras
17	FW	Fernando Cardozo	8 February 2001 (aged 16)	(Paraguayan Football Association) Olimpia
18	FW	Blas Armoa	3 February 2000 (aged 17)	(Paraguayan Football Association) Sportivo Luqueño
19	GK	Jonathan Martínez	12 March 2000 (aged 17)	(Paraguayan Football Association) Olimpia
20	MF	Giovanni Bogado	16 September 2001 (aged 16)	(Paraguayan Football Association) Libertad
21	MF	Alan Rodríguez	15 August 2000 (aged 17)	(Paraguayan Football Association) Cerro Porteño

=== Mali ===
Head coach: (Togo) Jonas Komla

No.	Pos.	Player	Date of birth (age)	Club
1	GK	Alkalifa Coulibaly	23 December 2001 (aged 15)	(Malian Football Federation) Niomi
2	DF	Boubacar Haidara	12 March 2000 (aged 17)	(Malian Football Federation) Bakaridjan
3	MF	Djemoussa Traoré	20 January 2000 (aged 17)	(Malian Football Federation) ALOB
4	DF	Fode Konaté	2 December 2000 (aged 16)	(Malian Football Federation) AS Bamako
5	DF	Mamadi Fofana	11 November 2000 (aged 16)	(Malian Football Federation) Diarra
6	MF	**Mohamed Camara**	6 January 2000 (aged 17)	(Malian Football Federation) Real Bamako
7	FW	Hadji Dramé	10 September 2000 (aged 17)	(Malian Football Federation) Yeelen Olympique
8	MF	Abdoulaye Dabo	20 July 2000 (aged 17)	(Malian Football Federation) Africa Foot
9	FW	Seme Camara	25 November 2000 (aged 16)	(Malian Football Federation) Diarra
10	MF	Salam Giddou	1 February 2000 (aged 17)	(Malian Football Federation) Guidars
11	FW	Mamadou Traoré	3 April 2002 (aged 15)	(Malian Football Federation) Stade Malien
12	FW	Mahamane Touré	13 July 2000 (aged 17)	(Malian Football Federation) Real Bamako
13	DF	Soumaila Doumbia	25 December 2000 (aged 16)	(Malian Football Federation) ASAC
14	MF	Siaka Sidibé	24 January 2001 (aged 16)	(Malian Football Federation) Stade Malien
15	DF	Abdoulaye Diaby	4 July 2000 (aged 17)	(Malian Football Federation) Djoliba
16	GK	Youssouf Koïta	27 August 2000 (aged 17)	(Malian Football Federation) AS Bamako
17	MF	Mamadou Samaké	15 May 2000 (aged 17)	(Malian Football Federation) Yeelen Olympique
18	DF	**Ibrahim Kane**	23 June 2000 (aged 17)	(Malian Football Federation) Black Stars
19	FW	Lassana N'Diaye	3 October 2000 (aged 17)	(Malian Football Federation) Guidars
20	MF	**Cheick Doucouré**	8 January 2000 (aged 17)	(Malian Football Federation) Real Bamako
21	GK	Massiré Gassama	5 April 2000 (aged 17)	(Malian Football Federation) Black Stars

=== New Zealand ===
New Zealand named their squad on 21 September 2017. Liam Moore was called up to as an injury replacement for Jordan Spain.

Head coach: (New Zealand) Danny Hay

No.	Pos.	Player	Date of birth (age)	Club
1	GK	Zac Jones	27 November 2000 (aged 16)	(New Zealand Football) Wellington Olympic
2	DF	Liam Moore	5 May 2000 (aged 17)	(New Zealand Football) Wellington Phoenix
3	DF	Joshua Rogerson	4 January 2000 (aged 17)	(New Zealand Football) Western Suburbs
4	DF	**Liberato Cacace**	27 September 2000 (aged 17)	(New Zealand Football) Wellington Phoenix
5	DF	Boyd Curry	6 March 2001 (aged 16)	(New Zealand Football) Onehunga Sports
6	MF	Leon Van Den Hoven	20 April 2000 (aged 17)	(New Zealand Football) Onehunga Sports
7	MF	**Elijah Just**	1 May 2000 (aged 17)	(New Zealand Football) Western Suburbs
8	MF	Oliver Duncan	30 January 2000 (aged 17)	(Football Australia) Brisbane Roar
9	MF	**Max Mata**	10 July 2000 (aged 17)	(New Zealand Football) Onehunga Sports
10	MF	Willem Ebbinge	6 January 2001 (aged 16)	(New Zealand Football) Wellington Phoenix
11	FW	Matthew Conroy	4 April 2001 (aged 16)	(New Zealand Football) Western Springs
12	GK	Jacob Clark	25 March 2001 (aged 16)	(New Zealand Football) Onehunga Sports
13	DF	Matthew Jones	8 April 2000 (aged 17)	(New Zealand Football) Twenty 11
14	MF	Kingsley Sinclair	25 February 2001 (aged 16)	(New Zealand Football) Onehunga Sports
15	DF	Ben Deeley	11 June 2000 (aged 17)	(New Zealand Football) Auckland Grammar School
16	MF	Oliver Whyte	20 January 2000 (aged 17)	(New Zealand Football) Wellington Phoenix
17	FW	Matthew Palmer	16 February 2000 (aged 17)	(New Zealand Football) Eastern Suburbs
18	FW	Charles Spragg	1 March 2000 (aged 17)	(New Zealand Football) Western Springs
19	MF	Kieran Richards	23 July 2000 (aged 17)	(New Zealand Football) Western Springs
20	DF	Emlyn Wellsmore	3 April 2000 (aged 17)	(Football Australia) Brisbane Roar
21	GK	Nicholas Milner	14 July 2000 (aged 17)	(Football Australia) Brisbane Roar

=== Turkey ===
Turkey named their squad on 16 September 2017.

Head coach: (Turkey) Mehmet Hacıoğlu

No.	Pos.	Player	Date of birth (age)	Club
1	GK	Berke Özer	25 May 2000 (aged 17)	(Turkish Football Federation) Altınordu
2	DF	Emirhan Civelek	5 January 2000 (aged 17)	(Turkish Football Federation) Galatasaray
3	DF	Melih Gökcimen	24 April 2000 (aged 17)	(Turkish Football Federation) Galatasaray
4	DF	Sahan Akyüz	1 January 2000 (aged 17)	(Turkish Football Federation) Altınordu
5	DF	**Ozan Kabak**	25 March 2000 (aged 17)	(Turkish Football Federation) Galatasaray
6	MF	Sefa Akgün	30 June 2000 (aged 17)	(Turkish Football Federation) Trabzonspor
7	FW	**Ahmed Kutucu**	1 March 2000 (aged 17)	(German Football Association) Schalke 04
8	MF	Kerem Atakan Kesgin	5 November 2000 (aged 16)	(Turkish Football Federation) Bucaspor
9	FW	Malik Karaahmet	18 January 2000 (aged 17)	(German Football Association) Karlsruher SC
10	MF	Atalay Babacan	28 June 2000 (aged 17)	(Turkish Football Federation) Galatasaray
11	MF	Recep Gül	5 November 2000 (aged 16)	(Turkish Football Federation) Galatasaray
12	GK	Eren Bilen	2 December 2000 (aged 16)	(Turkish Football Federation) Göztepe
13	DF	İsmail Çokçalış	21 June 2000 (aged 17)	(Turkish Football Federation) Bursaspor
14	MF	Umut Güneş	16 March 2000 (aged 17)	(German Football Association) VfB Stuttgart
15	FW	**Yunus Akgün**	7 July 2000 (aged 17)	(Turkish Football Federation) Galatasaray
16	MF	Sezer Taşkolu	16 May 2000 (aged 17)	(Turkish Football Federation) Göztepe
17	MF	Egehan Gök	27 February 2000 (aged 17)	(Turkish Football Federation) Altınordu
18	DF	Abdussamed Karnuçu	4 February 2000 (aged 17)	(Turkish Football Federation) Galatasaray
19	DF	Berk Çetin	2 February 2000 (aged 17)	(German Football Association) Borussia Mönchengladbach
20	FW	Embiya Ayyıldız	5 July 2000 (aged 17)	(Turkish Football Federation) Altınordu
21	GK	Ozan Oruç	26 May 2000 (aged 17)	(Turkish Football Federation) Altınordu

== Group C ==
=== Iran ===
Head coach: (Iran) Abbas Chamanyan

No.	Pos.	Player	Date of birth (age)	Club
1	GK	Ali Gholamzadeh	13 February 2000 (aged 17)	(Football Federation Islamic Republic of Iran) Foolad
2	DF	Ali Satavi	3 January 2000 (aged 17)	(Football Federation Islamic Republic of Iran) Foolad
3	DF	**Ahmadreza Jalali**	14 August 2001 (aged 16)	(Football Federation Islamic Republic of Iran) Foolad
4	DF	Amir Esmaeilzadeh	25 January 2000 (aged 17)	(Football Federation Islamic Republic of Iran) Paykan
5	DF	Majid Nasiri	14 May 2000 (aged 17)	(Football Federation Islamic Republic of Iran) Saipa
6	DF	Taha Shariati	3 March 2000 (aged 17)	(Football Federation Islamic Republic of Iran) Saipa
7	MF	**Amir Hossein Hosseinzadeh**	30 October 2000 (aged 16)	(Football Federation Islamic Republic of Iran) Moghavemat
8	MF	Mohammad Sharifi	21 March 2000 (aged 17)	(Football Federation Islamic Republic of Iran) Saipa
9	FW	**Allahyar Sayyadmanesh**	29 June 2001 (aged 16)	(Football Federation Islamic Republic of Iran) Saipa
10	MF	Mohammad Reza Ghobishavi	24 January 2000 (aged 17)	(Football Federation Islamic Republic of Iran) Sanat Naft
11	FW	Younes Delfi	2 October 2000 (aged 17)	(Football Federation Islamic Republic of Iran) Esteghlal Khuzestan
12	GK	Mobin Ashayer	9 February 2000 (aged 17)	(Football Federation Islamic Republic of Iran) Malavan
13	GK	Amir Janipour	14 September 2000 (aged 17)	(Football Federation Islamic Republic of Iran) Saipa
14	DF	Ali Davaran	4 September 2000 (aged 17)	(Football Federation Islamic Republic of Iran) Sanat Naft
15	MF	Alireza Koushki	16 February 2000 (aged 17)	(Football Federation Islamic Republic of Iran) Sepahan
16	MF	Vahid Namdari	26 June 2000 (aged 17)	(Football Federation Islamic Republic of Iran) Esteghlal Khuzestan
17	MF	Mohammad Ghaderi	27 February 2000 (aged 17)	(Football Federation Islamic Republic of Iran) Shahrdari Bandar Abbas
18	FW	Saeid Karimi	31 January 2000 (aged 17)	(Football Federation Islamic Republic of Iran) Zob Ahan
19	FW	Mohammad Sardari	3 February 2000 (aged 17)	(Football Federation Islamic Republic of Iran) Esteghlal
20	MF	Sobhan Khaghani	27 January 2000 (aged 17)	(Football Federation Islamic Republic of Iran) Siah Jamegan
21	MF	Amir Hossein Khodamoradi	13 September 2000 (aged 17)	(Football Federation Islamic Republic of Iran) Paykan

=== Guinea ===
Head coach: (Guinea) Souleymane Camara

No.	Pos.	Player	Date of birth (age)	Club
1	GK	Ibrahima Sylla	7 December 2002 (aged 14)	(Guinean Football Federation) Mendy
2	DF	Samuel Conté	13 March 2000 (aged 17)	(Guinean Football Federation) Académie Horoya
3	DF	Ibrahima Soumah	19 November 2001 (aged 15)	(Guinean Football Federation) Académie Horoya
4	DF	Cherif Camara	21 October 2002 (aged 14)	(Guinean Football Federation) Académie Sainte Marie
5	DF	Issiaga Camara	30 December 2002 (aged 14)	(Guinean Football Federation) Académie Hafia FC
6	MF	Sékou Camara	27 July 2001 (aged 16)	(Guinean Football Federation) Académie Sainte Marie
7	FW	Fandjé Touré	1 November 2002 (aged 14)	(Guinean Football Federation) Cefomig
8	FW	Lape Bangoura	31 December 2000 (aged 16)	(Guinean Football Federation) Académie Football de Conakry
9	FW	Doss Soumah	6 February 2000 (aged 17)	(Guinean Football Federation) Cefomig
10	MF	**Aguibou Camara**	20 May 2001 (aged 16)	(Guinean Football Federation) Académie Football de Conakry
11	FW	Djibril Sylla	10 November 2002 (aged 14)	(Guinean Football Federation) Académie Antonio Souaré
12	DF	M'bemba Camara	8 September 2000 (aged 17)	(Guinean Football Federation) Académie AS Kaloum
13	FW	**Seydouba Cissé**	10 February 2001 (aged 16)	(Guinean Football Federation) FC Attouga
14	MF	Salia Bangoura	15 November 2001 (aged 15)	(Guinean Football Federation) Cefomig
15	MF	Blaise Camara	11 March 2000 (aged 17)	(Guinean Football Federation) Esperance Conakry
16	GK	Abdoulaye Doumbouya	1 September 2001 (aged 16)	(Guinean Football Federation) Académie Football de Conakry
17	DF	Ismaël Traoré	10 June 2000 (aged 17)	(Guinean Football Federation) Académie FC Séquence
18	MF	**Elhadj Bah**	22 August 2001 (aged 16)	(Guinean Football Federation) Esperance Conakry
19	FW	Naby Bangoura	24 April 2001 (aged 16)	(Guinean Football Federation) Académie Sainte Marie
20	FW	Aly Soumah	10 January 2000 (aged 17)	(Tunisian Football Federation) Étoile du Sahel
21	GK	**Mohamed Camara**	16 March 2000 (aged 17)	(Guinean Football Federation) Académie Titi Camara

=== Germany ===
Head coach: (Germany) Christian Wück

No.	Pos.	Player	Date of birth (age)	Club
1	GK	Luca Plogmann	10 March 2000 (aged 17)	(German Football Association) Werder Bremen
2	DF	Alexander Nitzl	11 July 2000 (aged 17)	(German Football Association) Bayern Munich
3	DF	Pascal Hackethal	27 January 2000 (aged 17)	(German Football Association) Werder Bremen
4	DF	Dominik Becker	9 January 2000 (aged 17)	(German Football Association) 1. FC Köln
5	DF	Jan Boller	14 March 2000 (aged 17)	(German Football Association) Bayer Leverkusen
6	FW	Noah Awuku	9 January 2000 (aged 17)	(German Football Association) Holstein Kiel
7	MF	Sahverdi Cetin	28 September 2000 (aged 17)	(German Football Association) Eintracht Frankfurt
8	MF	Erik Majetschak	1 March 2000 (aged 17)	(German Football Association) RB Leipzig
9	FW	Jann-Fiete Arp	6 January 2000 (aged 17)	(German Football Association) Hamburger SV
10	MF	Elias Abouchabaka	31 March 2000 (aged 17)	(German Football Association) RB Leipzig
11	FW	Nicolas-Gerrit Kühn	1 January 2000 (aged 17)	(German Football Association) RB Leipzig
12	GK	Luis Klatte	1 March 2000 (aged 17)	(German Football Association) Hertha BSC
13	FW	Dennis Jastrzembski	20 February 2000 (aged 17)	(German Football Association) Hertha BSC
14	MF	Yannik Keitel	15 February 2000 (aged 17)	(German Football Association) SC Freiburg
15	DF	**Josha Vagnoman**	11 December 2000 (aged 16)	(German Football Association) Hamburger SV
16	DF	Lars Lukas Mai	31 March 2000 (aged 17)	(German Football Association) Bayern Munich
17	FW	Maurice Malone	17 August 2000 (aged 17)	(German Football Association) FC Augsburg
18	MF	**John Yeboah**	23 June 2000 (aged 17)	(German Football Association) VfL Wolfsburg
19	FW	Jessic Ngankam	20 July 2000 (aged 17)	(German Football Association) Hertha BSC
20	DF	**Yann Aurel Bisseck**	29 November 2000 (aged 16)	(German Football Association) 1. FC Köln
21	GK	Marian Prinz	7 February 2000 (aged 17)	(German Football Association) Bayer Leverkusen

=== Costa Rica ===
Head coach: (Costa Rica) Camacho Viquez

No.	Pos.	Player	Date of birth (age)	Club
1	GK	Ricardo Montenegro	9 July 2000 (aged 17)	(Costa Rican Football Federation) Saprissa
2	DF	Andres Hernández	1 January 2000 (aged 17)	(Costa Rican Football Federation) Saprissa
3	DF	**Fernán Faerron**	22 August 2000 (aged 17)	(Costa Rican Football Federation) Fútbol Consultants
4	DF	Karin Arce	1 March 2000 (aged 17)	(Costa Rican Football Federation) Alajuelense
5	MF	Amferny Arias	15 January 2000 (aged 17)	(Costa Rican Football Federation) Alajuelense
6	DF	Walter Cortés	5 February 2000 (aged 17)	(Costa Rican Football Federation) Saprissa
7	FW	Mario Mora	5 June 2000 (aged 17)	(Costa Rican Football Federation) Municipal Liberia
8	MF	Christian Muñoz	8 February 2000 (aged 17)	(Costa Rican Football Federation) Saprissa
9	FW	Julen Cordero	3 July 2001 (aged 16)	(Costa Rican Football Federation) Saprissa
10	FW	Greivin Fonseca	7 September 2000 (aged 17)	(Costa Rican Football Federation) Saprissa
11	DF	Felipe Flores	20 September 2000 (aged 17)	(Costa Rican Football Federation) Alajuelense
12	FW	**José Alfaro**	18 March 2000 (aged 17)	(Costa Rican Football Federation) Carmelita
13	GK	Brandon Calvo	15 November 2000 (aged 16)	(Costa Rican Football Federation) Alajuelense
14	MF	Ronnier Bustamante	5 June 2000 (aged 17)	(Costa Rican Football Federation) Herediano
15	MF	Josué Abarca	4 January 2000 (aged 17)	(Costa Rican Football Federation) Universidad de Costa Rica
16	FW	Andrés Gómez	7 May 2000 (aged 17)	(Costa Rican Football Federation) Belén
17	MF	Yecxy Jarquín	22 May 2000 (aged 17)	(Costa Rican Football Federation) Municipal Liberia
18	GK	**Kevin Chamorro**	8 April 2000 (aged 17)	(Costa Rican Football Federation) Carmelita
19	MF	Sebastian Castro	16 August 2000 (aged 17)	(Costa Rican Football Federation) Carmelita
20	DF	Alexander Roman	21 March 2001 (aged 16)	(Costa Rican Football Federation) Alajuelense
21	MF	**Daniel Chacón**	11 April 2001 (aged 16)	(Costa Rican Football Federation) Cartaginés

== Group D ==
=== North Korea ===
Head coach: (North Korea) Kim Yong-su

No.	Pos.	Player	Date of birth (age)	Club
1	GK	Sin Tae-song	30 May 2000 (aged 17)	(DPR Korea Football Association) Ryomyong
2	DF	Ri Hyok-sin	4 July 2000 (aged 17)	(DPR Korea Football Association) Ryomyong
3	DF	**Kim Kyong-sok**	19 February 2000 (aged 17)	(DPR Korea Football Association) Sonbong
4	MF	**Kye Tam**	6 October 2000 (aged 17)	(DPR Korea Football Association) Ryomyong
5	DF	Sin Kwang-sok	3 December 2000 (aged 16)	(DPR Korea Football Association) Ryomyong
6	DF	Han Kyong-hun	27 March 2000 (aged 17)	(DPR Korea Football Association) Ryomyong
7	FW	Kim Hwi-hwang	25 January 2000 (aged 17)	(DPR Korea Football Association) Ryomyong
8	MF	Kim Ju-song	29 June 2001 (aged 16)	(DPR Korea Football Association) Ryongnamsan
9	MF	Kim Chung-jin	26 October 2000 (aged 16)	(DPR Korea Football Association) Ryomyong
10	MF	**Kim Pom-hyok**	15 April 2000 (aged 17)	(DPR Korea Football Association) Ryomyong
11	MF	Kung Jin-song	12 April 2000 (aged 17)	(DPR Korea Football Association) Ryomyong
12	FW	Ri Kang-guk	10 January 2001 (aged 16)	(DPR Korea Football Association) Ryomyong
13	DF	Ri Hyon-il	12 March 2000 (aged 17)	(DPR Korea Football Association) Ryomyong
14	MF	Han Jin-bom	27 March 2001 (aged 16)	(DPR Korea Football Association) Ryomyong
15	DF	Cha Kwang	1 January 2000 (aged 17)	(DPR Korea Football Association) Ryomyong
16	MF	Ri Il-ju	13 October 2000 (aged 16)	(DPR Korea Football Association) Ryomyong
17	MF	Yun Min	3 July 2000 (aged 17)	(DPR Korea Football Association) Ryomyong
18	GK	Jong Ryong-hun	19 April 2000 (aged 17)	(DPR Korea Football Association) Ryomyong
19	FW	Kwon Nam-hyok	30 April 2000 (aged 17)	(DPR Korea Football Association) Ryomyong
20	MF	Paek Kwang-min	30 April 2000 (aged 17)	(DPR Korea Football Association) Ryomyong
21	GK	Kim Chol-jin	6 October 2000 (aged 17)	(DPR Korea Football Association) Ryomyong

=== Niger ===
Head coach: (Niger) Ismaila Tiemoko

No.	Pos.	Player	Date of birth (age)	Club
1	GK	Mousa Laouali	13 December 2000 (aged 16)	(Nigerien Football Federation) GNN
2	MF	Yacine Wa Massamba	9 March 2000 (aged 17)	(Nigerien Football Federation) Nigelec
3	DF	Mahamadou Mahamane	12 October 2001 (aged 15)	(Nigerien Football Federation) Nigelec
4	DF	Nasser Mahaman	24 September 2000 (aged 17)	(Nigerien Football Federation) Air Academie
5	DF	Farouk Idrissa	12 February 2000 (aged 17)	(Nigerien Football Federation) Lazaret
6	MF	Ismael Issaka	1 January 2000 (aged 17)	(Nigerien Football Federation) CBK
7	MF	Moctar Ousmane	15 September 2000 (aged 17)	(Nigerien Football Federation) Mano Dayak
8	MF	Habibou Sofiane	1 January 2000 (aged 17)	(Nigerien Football Federation) Renaissance
9	FW	**Kairou Amoustapha**	1 January 2001 (aged 16)	(Nigerien Football Federation) Nigelec
10	MF	Rachid Alfari	30 December 2000 (aged 16)	(Nigerien Football Federation) Nigelec
11	MF	Karim Tinni	21 January 2001 (aged 16)	(Nigerien Football Federation) Sahel
12	DF	Djibrilla Ibrahim	2 March 2002 (aged 15)	(Nigerien Football Federation) Douanes
13	MF	Yacouba Aboubacar	1 January 2000 (aged 17)	(Nigerien Football Federation) Tahoua
14	MF	Kader Aboubacar	31 December 2000 (aged 16)	(Nigerien Football Federation) Akokana
15	DF	Rachid Soumana	1 January 2000 (aged 17)	(Ghana Football Association) Tudu Mighty Jets
16	GK	Abdoulaye Boubacar	1 January 2001 (aged 16)	(Nigerien Football Federation) APO River
17	FW	**Ibrahim Marou**	1 January 2000 (aged 17)	(Nigerien Football Federation) Soniantcha
18	DF	Ibrahim Namata	10 May 2000 (aged 17)	(Nigerien Football Federation) Soniantcha
19	FW	Salim Abdourahmane	2 September 2001 (aged 16)	(Nigerien Football Federation) Jangorzo
20	FW	Hamid Galissoune	26 January 2000 (aged 17)	(Nigerien Football Federation) SACA Sport
21	GK	Khaled Lawali	15 July 2000 (aged 17)	(Nigerien Football Federation) Sahel

=== Brazil ===
Brazil named their squad on 8 September 2017.

Head coach: (Brazil) Carlos Amadeu

No.	Pos.	Player	Date of birth (age)	Club
1	GK	Gabriel Brazão	5 October 2000 (aged 17)	(Brazilian Football Confederation) Cruzeiro
2	DF	Wesley	13 March 2000 (aged 17)	(Brazilian Football Confederation) Flamengo
3	DF	Vitão	2 February 2000 (aged 17)	(Brazilian Football Confederation) Palmeiras
4	DF	Lucas Halter	2 May 2000 (aged 17)	(Brazilian Football Confederation) Atlético Paranaense
5	MF	Victor Bobsin	12 January 2000 (aged 17)	(Brazilian Football Confederation) Grêmio
6	DF	Weverson	5 July 2000 (aged 17)	(Brazilian Football Confederation) São Paulo
7	FW	**Paulinho**	15 July 2000 (aged 17)	(Brazilian Football Confederation) Vasco da Gama
8	MF	Marcos Antônio	13 June 2000 (aged 17)	(Brazilian Football Confederation) Atlético Paranaense
9	FW	Lincoln	16 December 2000 (aged 16)	(Brazilian Football Confederation) Flamengo
10	MF	Alan Souza	8 March 2000 (aged 17)	(Brazilian Football Confederation) Palmeiras
11	MF	Hélio Junio	25 April 2000 (aged 17)	(Brazilian Football Confederation) São Paulo
12	GK	Lucão	26 February 2001 (aged 16)	(Brazilian Football Confederation) Vasco da Gama
13	DF	Matheus Stockl	14 March 2000 (aged 17)	(Brazilian Football Confederation) Atlético Mineiro
14	DF	Rodrigo Guth	10 November 2000 (aged 16)	(Brazilian Football Confederation) Coritiba
15	DF	Luan Cândido	2 February 2001 (aged 16)	(Brazilian Football Confederation) Palmeiras
16	MF	Victor Yan	9 April 2001 (aged 16)	(Brazilian Football Confederation) Santos
17	MF	Rodrigo Nestor	9 August 2000 (aged 17)	(Brazilian Football Confederation) São Paulo
18	MF	Vitinho	4 January 2000 (aged 17)	(Brazilian Football Confederation) Corinthians
19	FW	**Yuri Alberto**	18 March 2001 (aged 16)	(Brazilian Football Confederation) Santos
20	FW	Brenner	16 January 2000 (aged 17)	(Brazilian Football Confederation) São Paulo
21	GK	Yuri Sena	3 January 2001 (aged 16)	(Brazilian Football Confederation) Vitória

=== Spain ===
Head coach: (Spain) Santiago Denia

No.	Pos.	Player	Date of birth (age)	Club
1	GK	Álvaro Fernández Calvo	10 April 2000 (aged 17)	(Royal Spanish Football Federation) Malaga
2	DF	Mateu Morey	2 March 2000 (aged 17)	(Royal Spanish Football Federation) Barcelona
3	DF	**Juan Miranda**	19 January 2000 (aged 17)	(Royal Spanish Football Federation) Barcelona
4	DF	**Hugo Guillamón**	31 January 2000 (aged 17)	(Royal Spanish Football Federation) Valencia
5	DF	Víctor Chust	5 March 2000 (aged 17)	(Royal Spanish Football Federation) Real Madrid
6	MF	**Antonio Blanco**	23 July 2000 (aged 17)	(Royal Spanish Football Federation) Real Madrid
7	FW	**Ferran Torres**	29 February 2000 (aged 17)	(Royal Spanish Football Federation) Valencia
8	MF	Mohamed Moukhliss	6 February 2000 (aged 17)	(Royal Spanish Football Federation) Real Madrid
9	FW	**Abel Ruiz**	28 January 2000 (aged 17)	(Royal Spanish Football Federation) Barcelona
10	FW	**Sergio Gómez**	4 September 2000 (aged 17)	(Royal Spanish Football Federation) Barcelona
11	FW	Nacho Díaz	27 June 2000 (aged 17)	(Royal Spanish Football Federation) Villarreal
12	FW	Pedro Ruiz	30 March 2000 (aged 17)	(Royal Spanish Football Federation) Real Madrid
13	GK	Marc Vidal	14 February 2000 (aged 17)	(Royal Spanish Football Federation) Villarreal
14	MF	Álvaro García	1 June 2000 (aged 17)	(Royal Spanish Football Federation) Albacete
15	DF	**Eric Garcia**	9 January 2001 (aged 16)	(The Football Association) Manchester City
16	FW	Diego Pampín	15 March 2000 (aged 17)	(Royal Spanish Football Federation) Celta Vigo
17	FW	José Lara	7 March 2000 (aged 17)	(Royal Spanish Football Federation) Sevilla
18	FW	César Gelabert	31 October 2000 (aged 16)	(Royal Spanish Football Federation) Real Madrid
19	MF	Carlos Beitia	15 February 2000 (aged 17)	(Royal Spanish Football Federation) Villarreal
20	DF	Víctor Gómez	1 April 2000 (aged 17)	(Royal Spanish Football Federation) Espanyol
21	GK	Alfonso Pastor	4 October 2000 (aged 17)	(Royal Spanish Football Federation) Sevilla

== Group E ==
=== Honduras ===
Head coach: José Valladares

No.	Pos.	Player	Date of birth (age)	Club
1	GK	Alex Rivera	20 July 2000 (aged 17)	(National Autonomous Federation of Football of Honduras) Motagua
2	DF	Santiago Cabrera	9 February 2000 (aged 17)	(National Autonomous Federation of Football of Honduras) Honduras Progreso
3	DF	Axel Gómez	28 June 2000 (aged 17)	(National Autonomous Federation of Football of Honduras) Olimpia
4	DF	Alexander Bahr	17 February 2001 (aged 16)	(United States Soccer Federation) Atlanta United
5	DF	Cristian Moreira	21 May 2000 (aged 17)	(National Autonomous Federation of Football of Honduras) Vida
6	MF	**Luis Palma**	17 January 2000 (aged 17)	(National Autonomous Federation of Football of Honduras) Vida
7	FW	Jorge Flores	19 September 2000 (aged 17)	(Royal Spanish Football Federation) Orientación Marítima
8	MF	**Gerson Chávez**	31 January 2000 (aged 17)	(National Autonomous Federation of Football of Honduras) Real España
9	FW	Patrick Palacios	29 January 2000 (aged 17)	(National Autonomous Federation of Football of Honduras) Real España
10	MF	Alessandro Castro	26 February 2000 (aged 17)	(United States Soccer Federation) Atlanta United
11	FW	Kenneth Martínez	26 February 2000 (aged 17)	(National Autonomous Federation of Football of Honduras) Motagua
12	GK	Jordy Castro	10 April 2000 (aged 17)	(National Autonomous Federation of Football of Honduras) Real España
13	DF	Gustavo Vallecillo	28 August 2000 (aged 17)	(National Autonomous Federation of Football of Honduras) CARDVA
14	MF	**Carlos Mejía**	19 February 2000 (aged 17)	(National Autonomous Federation of Football of Honduras) Vida
15	MF	David Cardona	8 October 2000 (aged 16)	(National Autonomous Federation of Football of Honduras) Real Juventud
16	FW	Asaf Cacho	27 July 2000 (aged 17)	(National Autonomous Federation of Football of Honduras) Motagua
17	MF	Everson López	3 November 2000 (aged 16)	(National Autonomous Federation of Football of Honduras) Motagua
18	MF	Joshua Canales	20 July 2000 (aged 17)	(National Autonomous Federation of Football of Honduras) Olimpia
19	FW	Reynaldo Bodden	29 September 2000 (aged 17)	(National Autonomous Federation of Football of Honduras) Victoria
20	DF	Emilio Campos	18 April 2000 (aged 17)	(Mexican Football Federation) UdeG
21	GK	Carlos Banegas	9 February 2001 (aged 16)	(National Autonomous Federation of Football of Honduras) Comayagua

=== Japan ===
Japan named their squad on 22 September 2017.

Head coach: (Japan) Yoshiro Moriyama

No.	Pos.	Player	Date of birth (age)	Club
1	GK	**Kosei Tani**	22 November 2000 (aged 16)	(Japan Football Association) Gamba Osaka
2	DF	Nobuki Iketaka	5 April 2000 (aged 17)	(Japan Football Association) Urawa Red Diamonds
3	DF	Yuki Kobayashi	18 July 2000 (aged 17)	(Japan Football Association) Vissel Kobe
4	MF	Rei Hirakawa	20 April 2000 (aged 17)	(Japan Football Association) FC Tokyo
5	DF	**Yukinari Sugawara**	28 June 2000 (aged 17)	(Japan Football Association) Nagoya Grampus
6	MF	Hinata Kida	4 July 2000 (aged 17)	(Japan Football Association) Cerezo Osaka
7	FW	**Takefusa Kubo**	4 June 2001 (aged 16)	(Japan Football Association) FC Tokyo
8	MF	Kohei Okuno	3 April 2000 (aged 17)	(Japan Football Association) Gamba Osaka
9	FW	Hiroto Yamada	7 March 2000 (aged 17)	(Japan Football Association) Cerezo Osaka
10	MF	Shimpei Fukuoka	27 June 2000 (aged 17)	(Japan Football Association) Kyoto Sanga
11	FW	Taisei Miyashiro	26 May 2000 (aged 17)	(Japan Football Association) Kawasaki Frontale
12	GK	**Zion Suzuki**	21 August 2002 (aged 15)	(Japan Football Association) Urawa Red Diamonds
13	FW	**Keito Nakamura**	28 July 2000 (aged 17)	(Japan Football Association) Mitsubishi Yowa
14	MF	Soichiro Kozuki	22 December 2000 (aged 16)	(Japan Football Association) Kyoto Sanga
15	DF	Seiya Baba	24 October 2001 (aged 15)	(Japan Football Association) Tokyo Verdy
16	DF	Taichi Yamasaki	8 January 2001 (aged 16)	(Japan Football Association) Sanfrecce Hiroshima
17	FW	**Koki Saito**	10 August 2001 (aged 16)	(Japan Football Association) Yokohama FC
18	MF	Toichi Suzuki	30 May 2000 (aged 17)	(Japan Football Association) Cerezo Osaka
19	DF	Takumu Kenmotsu	2 June 2000 (aged 17)	(Japan Football Association) Shimizu S-Pulse
20	MF	Naoki Tsubaki	23 June 2000 (aged 17)	(Japan Football Association) Yokohama F. Marinos
21	GK	Togo Umeda	23 July 2000 (aged 17)	(Japan Football Association) Shimizu S-Pulse

=== New Caledonia ===
New Caledonia named their squad on 14 September 2017.

Head coach: Dominique Wacalie

No.	Pos.	Player	Date of birth (age)	Club
1	GK	Unê Kecine	6 May 2001 (aged 16)	(New Caledonian Football Federation) Qanono Sports
2	DF	Raoul Wenisso	20 July 2000 (aged 17)	(New Caledonian Football Federation) Gaïtcha
3	DF	Henry Welepane	19 April 2000 (aged 17)	(New Caledonian Football Federation) Tiga Sports
4	DF	**Kiam Wanesse**	5 November 2001 (aged 15)	(New Caledonian Football Federation) Taramene Sports
5	DF	**Cameron Wadenges**	5 August 2000 (aged 17)	(New Caledonian Football Federation) Magenta
6	MF	Neil Wahiobe	6 January 2000 (aged 17)	(New Caledonian Football Federation) Païta
7	MF	**Jekob Jeno**	22 June 2000 (aged 17)	(New Caledonian Football Federation) Dumbea
8	MF	Pierre Bako	9 August 2001 (aged 16)	(New Caledonian Football Federation) Wetr
9	FW	Théo Bosshard	30 April 2001 (aged 16)	(New Caledonian Football Federation) Baco
10	MF	Cyril Nyipie	11 April 2000 (aged 17)	(New Caledonian Football Federation) Mont-Dore
11	FW	Titouan Richard	4 December 2000 (aged 16)	(New Caledonian Football Federation) Mont-Dore
12	MF	Galé Luewadia	26 February 2001 (aged 16)	(New Caledonian Football Federation) Wetr
13	FW	Vita Longue	25 November 2000 (aged 16)	(New Caledonian Football Federation) Païta
14	DF	Bernard Iwa	16 May 2000 (aged 17)	(New Caledonian Football Federation) Qanono Sports
15	DF	Hnautra Enoka	12 March 2001 (aged 16)	(New Caledonian Football Federation) Magenta
16	GK	Gaizka Ipeze	29 August 2001 (aged 16)	(New Caledonian Football Federation) Mont-Dore
17	MF	Paul Wananije	7 May 2001 (aged 16)	(New Caledonian Football Federation) Taramene Sports
18	DF	Josuah Hlemu	7 December 2000 (aged 16)	(New Caledonian Football Federation) Mont-Dore
19	DF	Jules Omei	14 July 2001 (aged 16)	(New Caledonian Football Federation) Mont-Dore
20	FW	Lionel Thahnaena	19 June 2001 (aged 16)	(New Caledonian Football Federation) Bethel Sport
21	GK	Robin Escorne	15 July 2001 (aged 16)	(New Caledonian Football Federation) Magenta

=== France ===
France named their squad on 21 September 2017.

Head coach: (France) Lionel Rouxel

No.	Pos.	Player	Date of birth (age)	Club
1	GK	**Yahia Fofana**	21 August 2000 (aged 17)	(French Football Federation) Le Havre
2	DF	Vincent Collet	23 March 2000 (aged 17)	(French Football Federation) Metz
3	DF	**Andy Pelmard**	12 March 2000 (aged 17)	(French Football Federation) Nice
4	DF	Oumar Solet	7 February 2000 (aged 17)	(French Football Federation) Laval
5	DF	William Bianda	30 April 2000 (aged 17)	(French Football Federation) Lens
6	MF	Claudio Gomes	23 July 2000 (aged 17)	(French Football Federation) Paris Saint-Germain
7	FW	Yacine Adli	29 July 2000 (aged 17)	(French Football Federation) Paris Saint-Germain
8	MF	**Aurélien Tchouaméni**	27 January 2000 (aged 17)	(French Football Federation) Bordeaux
9	FW	**Amine Gouiri**	16 February 2000 (aged 17)	(French Football Federation) Lyon
10	MF	Maxence Caqueret	15 February 2000 (aged 17)	(French Football Federation) Lyon
11	FW	Willem Geubbels	16 August 2001 (aged 16)	(French Football Federation) Lyon
12	FW	Alan Kerouedan	12 January 2000 (aged 17)	(French Football Federation) Rennes
13	FW	**Wilson Isidor**	27 August 2000 (aged 17)	(French Football Federation) Rennes
14	FW	Alexis Flips	18 January 2000 (aged 17)	(French Football Federation) Lille
15	MF	Mathis Picouleau	8 May 2000 (aged 17)	(French Football Federation) Rennes
16	GK	Brian Bernard	5 May 2000 (aged 17)	(French Football Federation) Lens
17	DF	Batista Mendy	12 January 2000 (aged 17)	(French Football Federation) Nantes
18	FW	Lenny Pintor	5 August 2000 (aged 17)	(French Football Federation) Brest
19	DF	**Maxence Lacroix**	6 April 2000 (aged 17)	(French Football Federation) Sochaux
20	DF	Melvin Bard	6 November 2000 (aged 16)	(French Football Federation) Lyon
21	GK	Illan Meslier	2 March 2000 (aged 17)	(French Football Federation) Lorient

== Group F ==
=== Iraq ===
Head coach: (Iraq) Qahtan Chathir

No.	Pos.	Player	Date of birth (age)	Club
1	GK	Ali Ibadi	16 February 2000 (aged 17)	(Iraq Football Association) Al-Quwa Al-Jawiya
2	MF	Habeeb Mohammed	3 July 2000 (aged 17)	(Iraq Football Association) Al-Talaba
3	DF	Ammar Mohammed	20 May 2000 (aged 17)	(Iraq Football Association) Al-Talaba
4	DF	**Maytham Jabbar**	10 November 2000 (aged 16)	(Iraq Football Association) Al-Shuala
5	DF	Muntadher Abdulsada	3 December 2000 (aged 16)	(Iraq Football Association) Al-Hudood
6	DF	**Muntadher Mohammed**	5 June 2001 (aged 16)	(Iraq Football Association) Al-Kahrabaa
7	FW	**Mohammed Dawood**	22 November 2000 (aged 16)	(Iraq Football Association) Al-Naft
8	MF	Saif Khalid	5 September 2000 (aged 17)	(Iraq Football Association) Al-Talaba
9	FW	Ali Kareem	5 December 2000 (aged 16)	(Iraq Football Association) Amanat Baghdad
10	MF	**Mohammed Ridha Jalil**	17 February 2000 (aged 17)	(Iraq Football Association) Al-Talaba
11	FW	Alaa Adnan	1 August 2000 (aged 17)	(Iraq Football Association) Al-Najda
12	GK	Mustafa Zuhair	15 February 2000 (aged 17)	(Iraq Football Association) Naft Al-Wasat
13	MF	Abbas Ali	1 January 2000 (aged 17)	(Iraq Football Association) Al-Quwa Al-Jawiya
14	MF	**Bassam Shakir**	17 May 2000 (aged 17)	(Iraq Football Association) Al-Karkh
15	DF	Abdulabbas Ayad	18 March 2000 (aged 17)	(Iraq Football Association) Al-Talaba
16	DF	Mohammed Al-Baqer	8 April 2000 (aged 17)	(Iraq Football Association) Al-Sinaa
17	MF	**Mohammed Ali Abbood**	1 October 2000 (aged 17)	(Iraq Football Association) Al-Najda
18	MF	Moamel Kareem	17 November 2000 (aged 16)	(Iraq Football Association) Al-Shorta
19	DF	Ali Raad	28 April 2000 (aged 17)	(Iraq Football Association) Al-Hudood
20	MF	Ahmed Sartip	20 February 2000 (aged 17)	(Iraq Football Association) Ghaz Al-Shamal
21	GK	Abdulazeez Ammar	6 November 2000 (aged 16)	(Iraq Football Association) Al-Shorta

=== Mexico ===
Mexico named their squad on 15 September 2017.

Head coach: (Mexico) Mario Arteaga

No.	Pos.	Player	Date of birth (age)	Club
1	GK	César López	10 June 2000 (aged 17)	(Mexican Football Federation) Guadalajara
2	DF	Adrián Vázquez	9 January 2000 (aged 17)	(Mexican Football Federation) Pachuca
3	DF	Carlos Robles	11 July 2000 (aged 17)	(Mexican Football Federation) Atlas
4	DF	**Luis Olivas**	10 February 2000 (aged 17)	(Mexican Football Federation) Guadalajara
5	DF	Raúl Sandoval	18 January 2000 (aged 17)	(Mexican Football Federation) Tijuana
6	MF	Marco Ruíz	14 March 2000 (aged 17)	(Mexican Football Federation) Atlas
7	FW	**Jairo Torres**	5 July 2000 (aged 17)	(Mexican Football Federation) Atlas
8	MF	Alexis Gutiérrez	26 February 2000 (aged 17)	(Mexican Football Federation) Guadalajara
9	FW	Daniel López	14 March 2000 (aged 17)	(Mexican Football Federation) Tijuana
10	FW	**Roberto de la Rosa**	4 January 2000 (aged 17)	(Mexican Football Federation) Pachuca
11	MF	Jesús Pérez	11 April 2000 (aged 17)	(Mexican Football Federation) Querétaro
12	GK	André Alcaráz	8 January 2000 (aged 17)	(Mexican Football Federation) Guadalajara
13	DF	Sergio Villarreal	10 January 2000 (aged 17)	(Mexican Football Federation) Monterrey
14	DF	**Haret Ortega**	19 May 2000 (aged 17)	(Mexican Football Federation) América
15	DF	Alan Maeda	5 February 2000 (aged 17)	(Mexican Football Federation) Santos
16	MF	Luis Gamíz	4 April 2000 (aged 17)	(Mexican Football Federation) Tijuana
17	MF	Carlos Guerrero	14 February 2000 (aged 17)	(Mexican Football Federation) León
18	MF	Deivoon Magaña	20 January 2000 (aged 17)	(Mexican Football Federation) Guadalajara
19	MF	**Diego Lainez**	9 June 2000 (aged 17)	(Mexican Football Federation) América
20	FW	**César Huerta**	3 December 2000 (aged 16)	(Mexican Football Federation) Guadalajara
21	GK	César Ramos	14 June 2000 (aged 17)	(Mexican Football Federation) Monterrey

=== Chile ===
Head coach: (Chile) Hernán Caputto

No.	Pos.	Player	Date of birth (age)	Club
1	GK	Rodrigo Cancino	9 February 2000 (aged 17)	(Football Federation of Chile) Universidad de Chile
2	DF	Gastón Zúñiga	19 February 2000 (aged 17)	(Football Federation of Chile) O'Higgins
3	DF	Lucas Alarcón	5 March 2000 (aged 17)	(Football Federation of Chile) Universidad de Chile
4	DF	Nicolás Aravena	17 June 2000 (aged 17)	(Football Federation of Chile) Colo-Colo
5	DF	Yerco Oyanedel	19 September 2000 (aged 17)	(Football Federation of Chile) Universidad Católica
6	MF	Martín Lara	28 December 2000 (aged 16)	(Football Federation of Chile) Universidad Católica
7	FW	Ignacio Contreras	11 April 2000 (aged 17)	(Football Federation of Chile) Colo-Colo
8	MF	**Maximiliano Guerrero**	15 January 2000 (aged 17)	(Football Federation of Chile) Universidad de Chile
9	FW	Ignacio Mesías	16 October 2000 (aged 16)	(Football Federation of Chile) Unión San Felipe
10	MF	Branco Provoste	14 April 2000 (aged 17)	(Football Federation of Chile) Colo-Colo
11	FW	Antonio Díaz	26 April 2000 (aged 17)	(Football Federation of Chile) O'Higgins
12	GK	Julio Bórquez	20 April 2000 (aged 17)	(Football Federation of Chile) Deportes Iquique
13	FW	Willian Gama	30 June 2000 (aged 17)	(Football Federation of Chile) Santiago Wanderers
14	FW	**Diego Valencia**	14 January 2000 (aged 17)	(Football Federation of Chile) Universidad Católica
15	DF	Sebastián Valencia	13 February 2000 (aged 17)	(Football Federation of Chile) Colo-Colo
16	MF	Oliver Rojas	11 June 2000 (aged 17)	(Football Federation of Chile) Audax Italiano
17	FW	Pedro Campos	2 June 2000 (aged 17)	(Football Federation of Chile) Universidad Católica
18	DF	Matías Silva	30 June 2000 (aged 17)	(Football Federation of Chile) Unión San Felipe
19	MF	Mauricio Morales	7 January 2000 (aged 17)	(Football Federation of Chile) Universidad de Chile
20	FW	Jairo Vásquez	16 January 2001 (aged 16)	(Argentine Football Association) Estudiantes de La Plata
21	GK	Hugo Araya	28 December 2000 (aged 16)	(Football Federation of Chile) Cobreloa

=== England ===
Head coach: (Wales) Steve Cooper

No.	Pos.	Player	Date of birth (age)	Club
1	GK	Curtis Anderson	27 September 2000 (aged 17)	(The Football Association) Manchester City
2	DF	TJ Eyoma	29 January 2000 (aged 17)	(The Football Association) Tottenham Hotspur
3	DF	Lewis Gibson	19 July 2000 (aged 17)	(The Football Association) Everton
4	MF	George McEachran	30 August 2000 (aged 17)	(The Football Association) Chelsea
5	DF	**Marc Guéhi**	13 July 2000 (aged 17)	(The Football Association) Chelsea
6	DF	Jonathan Panzo	25 October 2000 (aged 16)	(The Football Association) Chelsea
7	MF	**Phil Foden**	28 May 2000 (aged 17)	(The Football Association) Manchester City
8	MF	Tashan Oakley-Boothe	14 February 2000 (aged 17)	(The Football Association) Tottenham Hotspur
9	FW	Rhian Brewster	1 April 2000 (aged 17)	(The Football Association) Liverpool
10	MF	**Angel Gomes**	31 August 2000 (aged 17)	(The Football Association) Manchester United
11	MF	**Jadon Sancho**	25 March 2000 (aged 17)	(German Football Association) Borussia Dortmund
12	MF	Nya Kirby	31 January 2000 (aged 17)	(The Football Association) Crystal Palace
13	GK	Josef Bursik	12 July 2000 (aged 17)	(The Football Association) Stoke City
14	MF	**Callum Hudson-Odoi**	7 November 2000 (aged 16)	(The Football Association) Chelsea
15	DF	**Joel Latibeaudiere**	6 January 2000 (aged 17)	(The Football Association) Manchester City
16	FW	**Danny Loader**	28 August 2000 (aged 17)	(The Football Association) Reading
17	MF	**Emile Smith Rowe**	28 July 2000 (aged 17)	(The Football Association) Arsenal
18	DF	Steven Sessegnon	18 May 2000 (aged 17)	(The Football Association) Fulham
19	MF	**Morgan Gibbs-White**	27 January 2000 (aged 17)	(The Football Association) Wolverhampton Wanderers
20	MF	**Conor Gallagher**	6 February 2000 (aged 17)	(The Football Association) Chelsea
21	GK	Billy Crellin	30 June 2000 (aged 17)	(The Football Association) Fleetwood Town

*Sancho was withdrawn from the squad after the completion of the group stages by his club, Borussia Dortmund.
