= 2024–25 FC West Armenia season =

West Armenia
2024–25 season
- Manager: Patrik Papyan
- Stadium: Junior Sport Stadium
- Premier League: 11th (Relegated)
- Armenian Cup: Quarter-final
- Top goalscorer: League: Zakhar Tarasenko (6); All: Zakhar Tarasenko (6)

The 2024–25 season was FC West Armenia's fifth season playing in the Armenian football system, and their second in the Armenian Premier League.

== Season events ==
On 22 July, West Armenia announced the appointment of Patrik Papyan as their new head coach.

On 1 February, West Armenia announced the signing of Jonel Désiré from Telavi.

On 3 February, West Armenia announced the signing of Marco Sevilla from UGA Ardziv and Mkhitar Umreyan from Urartu.

On 5 February, West Armenia announced the signing of Davit Sargsyan from Mika.

On 6 February, West Armenia announced the signing of Romain Blake from Chicago Fire II.

On 19 February, West Armenia announced the signing of Yeison Racines from Delfín.

On 20 February, West Armenia announced the signing of Magomed Estamirov from Angusht Nazran, and the loan signings of Davit Petrosyan from Ararat-Armenia and Ishkhan Darbinyan from Pyunik.

On 23 February, West Armenia announced the signing of Juan Bravo who'd last played for Pyunik.

On 15 May, the postponed West Armenia versus Ararat-Armenia scheduled for 9 May, was awarded as a 3-0 technical defeat in favour of Ararat-Armenia. Due to this being the second time that West Armenia failed to show up for a match, they were disqualified from the league.

== Squad ==
As of match played 25 May 2024

Number	Name	Nationality	Position	Date of birth (age)	Signed from	Signed in	Contract ends	Apps.	Goals
Goalkeepers
1	Erik Lyansberg	(Armenia)	GK	18 May 2004 (aged 21)	Mika	2024		1	0
88	Andrija Dragojević	(Montenegro)	GK	25 December 1991 (aged 33)	Enosis Neon Paralimni	2024		23	0
91	Mkhitar Umreyan	(Armenia)	GK	23 September 2004 (aged 20)	Urartu	2025		2	0
Defenders
2	Artur Daniyelyan	(Armenia)	DF	9 February 1998 (aged 27)	Noah	2024		21	3
3	Artur Kartashyan	(Armenia)	DF	8 January 1997 (aged 28)	on loan from Alashkert	2024	2025	24	1
4	Erik Smbatyan	(Armenia)	DF	10 February 2003 (aged 22)	Ararat-Armenia	2024		14	0
6	Jefferson Granado	(Colombia)	DF	9 April 2003 (aged 22)	Botev Plovdiv	2024		26	1
10	Tigran Sargsyan	(Armenia)	DF	14 August 2003 (aged 21)	BKMA Yerevan	2024		5	0
14	Aventis Aventisian	(Armenia)	DF	17 August 2002 (aged 22)	Go Ahead Eagles	2024		23	0
17	Tigran Ayunts	(Armenia)	DF	15 March 2000 (aged 25)	Syunik	2024		16	1
18	Arsen Yeghiazaryan	(Armenia)	DF	15 January 2000 (aged 25)	Van	2024		12	1
20	Marco Sevilla	(France)	DF	4 March 1999 (aged 26)	UGA Ardziv	2025		7	0
22	Alex Junior	(Haiti)	DF	5 December 1993 (aged 31)	Unattached	2024		23	0
23	Ishkhan Darbinyan	(Armenia)	DF	10 April 2004 (aged 21)	on loan from Pyunik	2025	2025	6	0
44	Juan Bravo	(Colombia)	DF	1 April 1990 (aged 35)	Unattached	2025		0	0
59	Romain Blake	(Jamaica)	DF	24 July 2005 (aged 19)	Chicago Fire II	2025		8	1
99	Davit Sargsyan	(Armenia)	DF	8 June 2003 (aged 21)	Mika	2025		4	0
Midfielders
8	Aram Kocharyan	(Armenia)	MF	5 March 1996 (aged 29)	Alashkert	2024		23	0
9	Artur Israelyan	(Armenia)	MF	16 January 2004 (aged 21)	on loan from Urartu	2024		23	1
21	Spartak Hayrapetyan	(Armenia)	MF	11 April 2003 (aged 22)	Ararat-Armenia	2024		1	0
27	Davit Petrosyan	(Armenia)	MF	2 March 2005 (aged 20)	on loan from Ararat-Armenia	2025	2025	5	0
32	Nwabueze Uzochukwu Paschal	(Nigeria)	MF	6 October 2004 (aged 20)	Abia Warriors	2024		7	0
36	Vahram Makhsudyan	(Armenia)	MF	22 January 2003 (aged 22)	on loan from Ararat-Armenia	2023		35	0
66	Suleiman Idris	(Nigeria)	MF	19 October 2005 (aged 19)	on loan from Van	2024	2025	12	1
77	Magomed Estamirov	(Russia)	MF	5 July 2004 (aged 20)	Angusht Nazran	2025		4	0
Forwards
7	Martin Grigoryan	(Armenia)	FW	25 September 2000 (aged 24)	Unattached	2024		17	4
11	Jonel Désiré	(Haiti)	FW	12 February 1997 (aged 28)	Telavi	2025		4	0
19	Ibrahim Yusuf	(Nigeria)	FW	24 October 2003 (aged 21)	on loan from Van	2024	2025	11	2
33	Yeison Racines	(Ecuador)	FW	7 October 1998 (aged 26)	Delfín	2025		8	0
80	Izuchukwu Chimezie	(Nigeria)	FW	14 June 2001 (aged 23)	Plateau United	2024		20	0
Players away on loan
Players who left during the season
3	Artak Asatryan	(Armenia)	DF	25 January 2001 (aged 24)	Syunik	2024		5	0
5	Armen Sargsyan	(Armenia)	DF	20 February 2004 (aged 21)	BKMA Yerevan	2024		11	0
7	Hadji Dramé	(Mali)	FW	10 September 2000 (aged 24)	Unattached	2023		32	3
11	Zakhar Tarasenko	(Russia)	FW	12 October 1997 (aged 27)	KAMAZ	2023		48	14
13	Anatoly Ayvazov	(Armenia)	GK	8 June 1996 (aged 28)	Alashkert	2024		2	0
16	Braima Candé	(Portugal)	MF	4 September 1995 (aged 29)	FCB Magpies	2024		6	0
25	Timur Rudoselsky	(Kazakhstan)	DF	21 December 1994 (aged 30)	Ekibastuz	2024		11	1
99	Issa Jibril Traore	(Mali)	MF	21 September 2005 (aged 19)		2024		1	0

== Transfers ==
=== In ===
Date	Position	Nationality	Name	From	Fee	Ref.
5 August 2024	GK	(Armenia)	Anatoly Ayvazov	Alashkert	Undisclosed	
5 August 2024	DF	(Haiti)	Alex Junior	Unattached	Free	
6 August 2024	DF	(Armenia)	Aventis Aventisian	Go Ahead Eagles	Undisclosed	
7 August 2024	MF	(Armenia)	Aram Kocharyan	Alashkert	Undisclosed	
7 August 2024	MF	(Portugal)	Braima Candé	FCB Magpies	Undisclosed	
8 August 2024	DF	(Armenia)	Tigran Ayunts	Syunik	Undisclosed	
8 August 2024	DF	(Armenia)	Artur Danielyan	Noah	Undisclosed	
8 August 2024	DF	(Armenia)	Armen Sargsyan	BKMA Yerevan	Undisclosed	
8 August 2024	DF	(Armenia)	Erik Smbatyan	Ararat-Armenia	Undisclosed	
8 August 2024	DF	(Armenia)	Arsen Yeghiazaryan	Van	Undisclosed	
8 August 2024	DF	(Colombia)	Jefferson Granado	Botev Plovdiv	Undisclosed	
8 August 2024	MF	(Armenia)	Artak Asatryan	Syunik	Undisclosed	
8 August 2024	MF	(Armenia)	Martin Grigoryan	Unattached	Free	
8 August 2024	MF	(Armenia)	Tigran Sargsyan	BKMA Yerevan	Undisclosed	
13 August 2024	GK	(Montenegro)	Andrija Dragojević	Enosis Neon Paralimni	Undisclosed	
14 August 2024	DF	(Kazakhstan)	Timur Rudoselsky	Ekibastuz	Undisclosed	
12 September 2024	MF	(Nigeria)	Nwabueze Uzochukwu Paschal	GBS Academy	Undisclosed	
1 February 2025	FW	(Haiti)	Jonel Désiré	Telavi	Undisclosed	
3 February 2025	DF	(France)	Marco Sevilla	UGA Ardziv	Undisclosed	
3 February 2025	GK	(Armenia)	Mkhitar Umreyan	Urartu	Undisclosed	
5 February 2025	DF	(Armenia)	Davit Sargsyan	Mika	Undisclosed	
6 February 2025	DF	(Jamaica)	Romain Blake	Chicago Fire II	Undisclosed	
19 February 2025	FW	(Ecuador)	Yeison Racines	Delfín	Undisclosed	
20 February 2025	MF	(Russia)	Magomed Estamirov	Angusht Nazran	Undisclosed	
23 February 2025	DF	(Colombia)	Juan Bravo	Unattached	Free	

=== Loans in ===
Date from	Position	Nationality	Name	From	Date to	Ref.
8 August 2024	MF	(Armenia)	Artur Israelyan	Urartu	End of season	
20 August 2024	FW	(Nigeria)	Ibrahim Yusuf	Van	End of season	
22 August 2024	FW	(Nigeria)	Sunday Victor Chimez	GBS Academy	End of season	
23 August 2024	DF	(Armenia)	Artur Kartashyan	Alashkert	End of season	
12 September 2024	MF	(Nigeria)	Suleiman Idris	Van	End of season	
20 February 2025	DF	(Armenia)	Ishkhan Darbinyan	Pyunik	End of season	
20 February 2025	MF	(Armenia)	Davit Petrosyan	Ararat-Armenia	End of season	

=== Released ===
Date	Position	Nationality	Name	Joined	Date	Ref.
31 December 2024	GK	(Armenia)	Anatoly Ayvazov	Van	6 February 2025	
31 December 2024	DF	(Armenia)	Armen Sargsyan	Van	23 February 2025	
31 December 2024	DF	(Kazakhstan)	Timur Rudoselsky	Zhetysu		
31 December 2024	MF	(Mali)	Issa Jibril Traore	Senglea Athletic		
31 December 2024	MF	(Portugal)	Braima Candé	Tarxien Rainbows		
31 December 2024	FW	(Mali)	Hadji Dramé	AP Brera Strumica		
31 December 2024	FW	(Russia)	Zakhar Tarasenko	Pelister		

== Competitions ==
=== Overall record ===
Competition	First match	Last match	Starting round	Final position	Record							
Competition	First match	Last match	Starting round	Final position	Pld	W	D	L	GF	GA	GD	Win %
Premier League	9 August 2024	27 May 2025	Matchday 2	11th	30	7	2	21	22	78	−56	23.33
Armenian Cup	2 October 2024	2 April 2025	Second Round	Quarter-final	3	1	0	2	4	7	−3	33.33
Total					33	8	2	23	26	85	−59	24.24

Last updated: 27 May 2025
Source: Competitions

=== Premier League ===
==== Results summary ====
Overall								Home						Away					
Pld	W	D	L	GF	GA	GD	Pts	W	D	L	GF	GA	GD	W	D	L	GF	GA	GD
30	7	2	21	22	78	−56	23	4	2	9	14	28	−14	3	0	12	8	50	−42

Last updated: 27 May 2025.
Source: See Results

==== Results by round ====
Round	1	3	4	5	6	7	8	9	10	11	12	13	14	15	16	17	18	19	3	20	21	22	23	24	25	26	27	28	29	30	31	32	33
Ground	-	H	H	A	H	A	H	A	H	A	H	A	H	A	H	A	H	A	A	H	H	-	A	A	A	H	-	H	A	H	A	H	A
Result	P	L	L	L	L	L	L	W	W	L	D	W	W	L	D	L	L	W	L	L	W	P	L	L	L	W	P	L	L	L	L	L	L
Position	8	10	11	11	10	10	10	9	9	9	10	10	9	9	8	9	9	8	9	8	8	8	8	9	9	8	9	9	9	9	11	11	11

Updated to match(es) played on 15 May 2025. Source: See Results
A = Away; H = Home; W = Win; D = Draw; L = Loss; P = Bye

==== Results ====
1	Bye
(UTC+4)

9 August 2024 2	West Armenia	2–5	BKMA Yerevan	Yerevan
19:00 (UTC+4)	Tarasenko 16', 90+6' (pen.); Aventisian (yellow card) 83'	Report	Tsarukyan (yellow card) 15'; Yeghiazaryan 20' (o.g.); Eloyan 23'; N.Hovhannisyan 32', 37'; Hakobyan (yellow card) 40'; Abrahamyan (yellow card) 75'; Bashoyan 90+2'; Tsarukyan (yellow card) 15'	Stadium: Junior Sports Stadium; Referee: Henrik Nalbandian

24 August 2024 4	West Armenia	1–2	Ararat Yerevan	Yerevan
17:00 (UTC+4)	Aventisian (red card) 14'; A.Sargsyan (yellow card) 56'; Rudoselsky (yellow card) 71'; Yusuf (yellow card) 73'; Yeghiazaryan 90+10'	Report	Malakyan (yellow card) 45'; Kante (yellow card) 56' (goal) 90+6'; Galstyan 80'; Dombila (yellow card) 90+5'	Stadium: Junior Sports Stadium; Referee: Ashot Ghaltakhchyan

31 August 2024 5	Van	6–0	West Armenia	Charentsavan
17:00 (UTC+4)	Batigi 14', 43', 56' (yellow card) 69'; Rudoselsky 17' (o.g.); Okonkwo (yellow card) 21'; Nalbandyan 45'; Matyukhin (yellow card) 54'; Touré 69' (pen.)	Report	Kartashyan (yellow card) 55'; Candé (yellow card) 64'; A.Sargsyan (red card) 66'	Stadium: City Stadium; Referee: Hovhannes Kalantaryan

13 September 2024 6	West Armenia	1–3	Pyunik	Yerevan
19:00 (UTC+4)	Chimezie (yellow card) 30'; Danielyan (yellow card) 32' (goal) 65'; Dramé (yellow card) 53'; Yusuf (yellow card) 72'; Rudoselsky (yellow card) 78'	Report	Agdon 5'; Vakulenko (yellow card) 32'; Otubanjo 38'; Déblé 87'	Stadium: Junior Sports Stadium; Referee: Zaven Hovhannisyan

18 September 2024 7	Urartu	3–0	West Armenia	Yerevan
19:00 (UTC+4)	Ignatyev (red card) 4'; Margaryan 16'; Simonyan (yellow card) 72'; Aghasaryan (yellow card) 80'	Report	Rudoselsky (yellow card) 4'; Tarasenko 7'; Idris (yellow card) 23'; Granado (yellow card) 24'; Kartashyan (yellow card) 61'; Yusuf 90+7'	Stadium: Urartu Stadium; Referee: David Mkrtchyan
Note: The match original finished as a 2-1 win for West Armenia, however on 30 September, the FFA awarded the match as a 3-0 technical victory to Urartu after West Armenia failed to have at least 3 players training in Armenia on the pitch at the same time.

24 September 2024 8	West Armenia	1–2	Ararat-Armenia	Yerevan
17:00 (UTC+4)	Kocharyan (yellow card) 45+1'; Tarasenko 45+4' (pen.); Rudoselsky (yellow card) 90+15'; Ayunts (yellow card) 90+16'	Report	Duarte (yellow card) 27'; Ocansey 35'; Pavlovets (yellow card) 45+3'; Rodríguez (yellow card) 89'; Grigoryan (yellow card) 90+4'; Serobyan 90+13' (pen.); Queirós (yellow card) 90+15'; Kucher (yellow card) 90+15'	Stadium: Junior Sport Stadium; Referee: Yura Mahtesyan

28 September 2024 9	Alashkert	0–2	West Armenia	Abovyan
16:00 (UTC+4)	Murilo (yellow card) 18'; B.Hovhannisyan (yellow card) 90+3'; Khachatryan (yellow card) 90+4'	Report	Dramé (yellow card) 14'; Junior (yellow card) 21'; Granado (yellow card) 44'; Yusuf 69', 88'; Danielyan (yellow card) 90+3'	Stadium: City Stadium; Referee: Henrik Nalbandian

7 October 2024 10	West Armenia	2–0	Gandzasar Kapan	Yerevan
19:00 (UTC+4)	Danielyan 29'; Kartashyan (yellow card) 35'; Israelyan 90+1'; T.Sargsyan (yellow card) 90+5'	Report	Traore (yellow card) 48' (yellow-red card) 64'	Stadium: Junior Sport Stadium; Referee: Zaven Hovhannisyan

17 October 2024 11	Shirak	2–0	West Armenia	Gyumri
19:00 (UTC+4)	Misakyan 4'; R.Darbinyan (yellow card) 37'; Doh (yellow card) 53'; Vidić (yellow card) 80'; Kodia 90+6'	Report	Junior (yellow card) 31'; Kocharyan (yellow card) 35'; Yusuf (yellow card) 44'; Granado (yellow card) 60'; Makhsudyan (yellow card) 87'; Uzochukwu (yellow card) 90'	Stadium: City Stadium; Referee: Ashot Harutyunyan

21 October 2024 12	West Armenia	2–2	Urartu	Yerevan
19:00 (UTC+4)	Danielyan (yellow card) 20'; Ayunts (yellow card) 45+1' (goal) 53'; Dramé 62'; A.Sargsyan (yellow card) 76'	Report	Ignatyev 14', 90+6'; Abou (yellow card) 33'; Isaac (yellow card) 51'	Stadium: Junior Sport Stadium; Referee: Yura Mahtesyan

27 October 2024 13	Gandzasar Kapan	0–1	West Armenia	Yerevan
15:00 (UTC+4)	Opoku (yellow card) 66'; Shahinyan (yellow card) 85'; Paronyan (yellow card) 90+6'	Report	Junior (yellow card) 7'; Kartashyan (yellow card) 18'; Dramé 53'; Dragojević (yellow card) 82'; Makhsudyan (yellow card) 88'	Stadium: Junior Sport Stadium; Referee: Vardan Vardumyan

31 October 2024 14	West Armenia	2–0	Alashkert	Yerevan
16:00 (UTC+4)	Tarasenko 45+3' (pen.), 57' (yellow card) 83'; Rudoselsky (yellow card) 90+2'	Report	Musakhanyan (red card) 45+2'	Stadium: Junior Sport Stadium; Referee: Sargis Khachatryan

6 November 2024 15	Ararat-Armenia	3–0	West Armenia	Yerevan
17:00 (UTC+4)	Harutyunyan (yellow card) 29'; Gbomadu 37'; Yenne 75'; Rodríguez 81'	Report		Stadium: Yerevan Football Academy Stadium; Referee: Ashot Ghaltakhchyan

9 November 2024 16	West Armenia	0–0	Shirak	Yerevan
19:00 (UTC+4)	Dramé (yellow card) 50'	Report	L.Darbinyan (yellow card) 32'; Urushanyan (yellow card) 60'; Mkrtchyan (yellow card) 90+1'	Stadium: Junior Sport Stadium; Referee: Henrik Nalbandian

21 November 2024 17	Pyunik	3–0	West Armenia	Yerevan
17:00 (UTC+4)		Report		Stadium: Junior Sports Stadium; Referee: Levon Vardapetyan
Note: The match was cancelled on 21 November after West Armenia did not attend due to a protest by their players over late payment of salaries. The match was awarded as a 3-0 technical defeat in favour of Pyunik on 6 December.

26 November 2024 18	West Armenia	0–2	Van	Yerevan
15:00 (UTC+4)	Junior (yellow card) 26'; Danielyan (yellow card) 89'; Makhsudyan (yellow card) 90+2'	Report	Farayola 45+7'; Terteryan (yellow card) 60'; Touré (yellow card) 67'; Akila 87'	Stadium: Junior Sport Stadium; Referee: Ashot Ghaltakhchyan

3 December 2024 19	Ararat Yerevan	2–3	West Armenia	Yerevan
15:00 (UTC+4)	Goore 18', 19' (yellow card) 21'; Malakyan (red card) 90+6'	Report	Grigoryan 12'; Makhsudyan (yellow card) 42'; Idris (yellow card) 45'; Smbatyan (yellow card) 55'; Kartashyan (yellow card) 57' (goal) 77'; Tarasenko 58'; Dragojević (yellow card) 90+6'	Stadium: Republican Stadium; Referee: Vardan Vardumyan

15 December 2024 3	Noah	7–1	West Armenia	Yerevan
17:00 (UTC+4)	Pinson 13'; Gregório 22', 75', 82', 85'; Silva 26'; Omar 62' (yellow card) 62'	Report	Grigoryan 43'	Stadium: Republican Stadium; Referee: Zaven Hovhannisyan

24 February 2025 20	West Armenia	0–4	Noah	Yerevan
16:00 (UTC+4)	Désiré (yellow card) 44'; Blake (yellow card) 46' (yellow-red card) 58'; Granado (yellow card) 83'	Report	Çinari 11', 64'; Pinson (yellow card) 17'; Dashyan 40'; Gregório 59' (pen.); Zolotić (yellow card) 78'	Stadium: Junior Sport Stadium; Referee: Henrik Nalbandian

2 March 2025 21	West Armenia	1–0	BKMA Yerevan	Yerevan
13:00 (UTC+4)	Idris 6' (yellow card) 69'	Report	Vardanyan (red card) 90+7'	Stadium: Junior Sport Stadium; Referee: Artem Gasparyan

22	Bye
(UTC+4)

16 March 2025 23	Van	2–0	West Armenia	Charentsavan
15:00 (UTC+4)	Terteryan 1' (yellow card) 57'; Bationo (yellow card) 10'; Okonkwo 45+6'; Klaidher (yellow card) 70'	Report	Israelyan (yellow card) 45+5'; Makhsudyan (yellow card) 68'; Kartashyan (yellow card) 75'; Racines (yellow card) 75'	Stadium: City Stadium; Referee: Yura Mahtesyan

27 March 2025 24	BKMA Yerevan	3–0	West Armenia	Yerevan
16:00 (UTC+4)	Ha.Sargsyan (yellow card) 13'; M.Hakobyan 34'; D.Hakobyan 59' (pen.); N.Hovhannisyan 62'; Manukyan (yellow card) 70'; Vardanyan (yellow card) 73' (red card) 73'	Report	Danielyan (yellow card) 45+1'; Dragojević (yellow card) 53'; Idris (red card) 54'; Chimezie (yellow card) 55'; Kartashyan (yellow card) 61'; Granado (yellow card) 73'	Stadium: Yerevan Football Academy Stadium; Referee: Ashot Ghaltakhchyan

6 April 2025 25	Noah	5–1	West Armenia	Yerevan
19:00 (UTC+4)	Hambardzumyan 38'; Aiás 50', 90+4'; Makhsudyan 79' (o.g.); Gregório 87'	Report	Israelyan (yellow card) 32'; Grigoryan 77'; Aventisian (yellow card) 90'	Stadium: Republican Stadium; Referee: David Mkrtchyan

14 April 2025 26	West Armenia	2–1	Ararat Yerevan	Yerevan
16:00 (UTC+4)	Granado (yellow card) 45+1' (goal) 53'; Makhsudyan (yellow card) 65'; Blake 78' (yellow card) 85'; Ayunts (yellow card) 90+2'; Danielyan (yellow card) 90+5'	Report	Diabira (red card) 20'; Ayvazyan (yellow card) 65'; Bah 69'; Boniface (yellow card) 83'	Stadium: Junior Sport Stadium; Referee: Artak Vardanyan

27	Bye
(UTC+4)

23 April 2025 28	West Armenia	0–1	Pyunik	Yerevan
16:00 (UTC+4)	Racines (yellow card) 18'; Danielyan (yellow card) 21'; Grigoryan (yellow card) 90+10' (red card) 90+10'	Report	Déblé 11'; Kulikov (yellow card) 65'; Kovalenko (yellow card) 75'; Agdon (yellow card) 84'; Vakulenko (yellow card) 88'; Davidyan (yellow card) 90+1'; Buhari (yellow card) 90+5'	Stadium: Junior Sport Stadium; Referee: Ashot Ghaltakhchyan

3 May 2025 29	Urartu	8–0	West Armenia	Yerevan
19:00 (UTC+4)	Melkonyan 4', 30', 56'; Putsko 15', 44'; Aghasaryan 24'; Ayvazyan 34'; Gunko 76'	Report	Racines (yellow card) 39'	Stadium: Urartu Stadium; Referee: Ashot Ghaltakhchyan

9 May 2025 30	West Armenia	0–3	Ararat-Armenia	Yerevan
16:00 (UTC+4)				Stadium: Junior Sport Stadium
Note: Match postponed on 9 May after West Armenia failed to show up. The match was awarded as a 3-0 technical defeat in favour of Ararat-Armenia on 15 May when West Armenia where disqualified from the league.

16 May 2025 31	Alashkert	3–0	West Armenia	Armavir
(UTC+4)				Stadium: City Stadium
Note: West Armenia disqualified from the league on 15 May.

22 May 2025 32	West Armenia	0–3	Gandzasar Kapan	Yerevan
(UTC+4)				Stadium: Junior Sport Stadium
Note: West Armenia disqualified from the league on 15 May.

27 May 2025 33	Shirak	3–0	West Armenia	Gyumri
(UTC+4)				Stadium: City Stadium
Note: West Armenia disqualified from the league on 15 May.

==== League table ====
Pos	Team	Pld	W	D	L	GF	GA	GD	Pts	Qualification or relegation
1	Noah (C)	30	24	3	3	92	20	+72	75	Qualification for the Champions League first qualifying round
2	Ararat-Armenia	30	21	3	6	75	28	+47	66	Qualification for the Conference League second qualifying round (Note: The 2024–25 Armenian Cup winners qualified for the Conference League second qualifying round. Since the cup winners (Noah) qualified based on league position, the Conference League second round spot was passed to the second-placed team, and the second Conference League first round spot was passed to the fourth-placed team.)
3	Urartu	30	19	5	6	64	31	+33	62	Qualification for the Conference League first qualifying round
4	Pyunik	30	17	2	11	59	37	+22	53	Qualification for the Conference League first qualifying round
5	Van	30	15	7	8	56	36	+20	52	
6	BKMA	30	10	6	14	44	54	−10	36	
7	Shirak	30	10	5	15	30	50	−20	35	
8	Ararat Yerevan	30	9	5	16	36	59	−23	32	
9	Alashkert	30	6	8	16	24	52	−28	26	
10	West Armenia (Note: On 7 May 2025, it was announced that West Armenia were on the verge of expulsion after a no show against Ararat-Armenia. On 17 May 2025, they were officially expelled and all games were awarded 3–0 to their opponents.) (D, R)	30	7	2	21	22	78	−56	23	Relegation to the Armenian First League
11	Gandzasar Kapan	30	2	4	24	16	73	−57	10	Spared from relegation

Source: FFA
Rules for classification: 1) Points; 2) Head-to-head points; 3) Head-to-head goal difference; 4) Head-to-head goals scored; 5) Matches won; 6) Goal difference; 7) Less red cards; 8) Less yellow cards; 9) Fair-play ranking 10) Draw
(C) Champions; (D) Disqualified; (R) Relegated

=== Armenian Cup ===
2 October 2024 Second round	West Armenia	2–1	Syunik	Yerevan
17:00 (UTC+4)	Rudoselsky 12'; Grigoryan (yellow card) 21'; Yusuf (yellow card) 24'; Danielyan 36' (yellow card) 53'; A.Sargsyan (yellow card) 81'	Report	Vardanyan (yellow card) 21'; Arutyunyan 45' (yellow card) 59'; Arakelyan (yellow card) (yellow-red card) 62'; Avetisyan (yellow card) 90+6'	Stadium: Junior Sport Stadium; Referee: Tiran Eritsyann

6 March 2025 Quarter-finals 1st leg	Van	3–0	West Armenia	Charentsavan
15:00 (UTC+4)	Nalbandyan 45' (pen.), 60'; Touré (penalty missed) 57' 58'	Report	Makhsudyan (yellow card) 24'; Désiré (yellow card) 46'	Stadium: City Stadium; Referee: Davit Mkrtchyan

2 April 2025 Quarter-finals 2nd leg	West Armenia	2–3 (2–6 agg.)	Van	Yerevan
16:00 (UTC+4)	Matyukhin 38' (o.g.); Grigoryan 90+3' (pen.)	Report	Okonkwo 17'; Akorede (yellow card) 31'; Gareginyan (yellow card) 34'; Vardanyan 45'; Odeyinka 65'	Stadium: Junior Sport Stadium; Referee: Artem Gasparyan

== Squad statistics ==
As of match played 3 May 2025

=== Appearances and goals ===
No.	Pos	Nat	Player	Total		Premier League		Armenian Cup	
No.	Pos	Nat	Player	Apps	Goals	Apps	Goals	Apps	Goals
1	GK	(Armenia) ARM	Erik Lyansberg	1	0	1	0	0	0
2	DF	(Armenia) ARM	Artur Danielyan	21	3	16+3	2	1+1	1
3	DF	(Armenia) ARM	Artur Kartashyan	24	1	21	1	2+1	0
4	DF	(Armenia) ARM	Erik Smbatyan	14	0	10+3	0	1	0
6	DF	(Colombia) COL	Jefferson Granado	26	1	22+2	1	2	0
7	FW	(Armenia) ARM	Martin Grigoryan	17	4	7+8	3	2	1
8	MF	(Armenia) ARM	Aram Kocharyan	23	0	14+7	0	1+1	0
9	MF	(Armenia) ARM	Artur Israelyan	23	1	12+8	1	1+2	0
10	DF	(Armenia) ARM	Tigran Sargsyan	5	0	3+2	0	0	0
11	FW	(Haiti) HAI	Jonel Désiré	4	0	2+1	0	1	0
14	DF	(Armenia) ARM	Aventis Aventisian	23	0	15+5	0	2+1	0
17	DF	(Armenia) ARM	Tigran Ayunts	16	1	6+8	1	1+1	0
18	DF	(Armenia) ARM	Arsen Yeghiazaryan	12	1	3+9	1	0	0
19	FW	(Nigeria) NGR	Ibrahim Yusuf	11	2	6+4	2	1	0
20	DF	(France) FRA	Marco Sevilla	7	0	4+1	0	1+1	0
21	MF	(Armenia) ARM	Spartak Hayrapetyan	1	0	1	0	0	0
22	DF	(Haiti) HAI	Alex Junior	23	0	20	0	3	0
23	DF	(Armenia) ARM	Ishkhan Darbinyan	6	0	2+2	0	1+1	0
27	MF	(Armenia) ARM	Davit Petrosyan	5	0	1+3	0	0+1	0
32	MF	(Nigeria) NGR	Nwabueze Uzochukwu Paschal	7	0	0+6	0	0+1	0
33	FW	(Ecuador) ECU	Yeison Racines	8	0	5+1	0	1+1	0
36	FW	(Armenia) ARM	Vahram Makhsudyan	22	0	14+5	0	3	0
59	DF	(Jamaica) JAM	Romain Blake	8	1	5+2	1	1	0
66	MF	(Nigeria) NGR	Suleiman Idris	12	1	8+3	1	1	0
77	MF	(Russia) RUS	Magomed Estamirov	4	0	1+3	0	0	0
80	FW	(Nigeria) NGR	Izuchukwu Chimezie	20	0	7+12	0	1	0
88	GK	(Montenegro) MNE	Andrija Dragojević	23	0	20	0	3	0
91	GK	(Armenia) ARM	Mkhitar Umreyan	2	0	2	0	0	0
99	DF	(Armenia) ARM	Davit Sargsyan	4	0	1+1	0	0+2	0
Players away on loan:
Players who left West Armenia during the season:
3	DF	(Armenia) ARM	Artak Asatryan	5	0	1+4	0	0	0
5	DF	(Armenia) ARM	Armen Sargsyan	11	0	8+2	0	1	0
7	FW	(Mali) MLI	Hadji Dramé	18	2	12+5	2	1	0
11	FW	(Russia) RUS	Zakhar Tarasenko	14	6	11+2	6	0+1	0
13	GK	(Armenia) ARM	Anatoly Ayvazov	2	0	2	0	0	0
16	MF	(Portugal) POR	Braima Candé	6	0	3+3	0	0	0
25	DF	(Kazakhstan) KAZ	Timur Rudoselsky	11	1	9+1	0	1	1
99	MF	(Mali) MLI	Issa Jibril Traore	1	0	0+1	0	0	0

=== Goal scorers ===
Place	Position	Nation	Number	Name	Premier League	Armenian Cup	Total
1	FW	(Russia)	11	Zakhar Tarasenko	6	0	6
2	FW	(Armenia)	7	Martin Grigoryan	3	1	4
3	DF	(Armenia)	2	Artur Danielyan	2	1	3
4	FW	(Nigeria)	19	Ibrahim Yusuf	2	0	2
4	FW	(Mali)	7	Hadji Dramé	2	0	2
6	DF	(Armenia)	18	Arsen Yeghiazaryan	1	0	1
6	MF	(Armenia)	9	Artur Israelyan	1	0	1
6	DF	(Armenia)	17	Tigran Ayunts	1	0	1
6	DF	(Armenia)	3	Artur Kartashyan	1	0	1
6	MF	(Nigeria)	66	Suleiman Idris	1	0	1
6	DF	(Colombia)	8	Jefferson Granado	1	0	1
6	DF	(Jamaica)	59	Romain Blake	1	0	1
6	DF	(Kazakhstan)	25	Timur Rudoselsky	0	1	1
6				Own goal	0	1	1
				TOTALS	22	4	26

=== Clean sheets ===
Place	Position	Nation	Number	Name	Premier League	Armenian Cup	Total
1	GK	(Montenegro)	88	Andrija Dragojević	6	0	6
				TOTALS	6	0	6

=== Disciplinary record ===
Number	Nation	Position	Name	Premier League		Armenian Cup		Total	
Number	Nation	Position	Name	Booked	Sent off (straight red)	Booked	Sent off (straight red)	Booked	Sent off (straight red)
2	(Armenia)	DF	Artur Danielyan	7	0	1	0	8	0
3	(Armenia)	DF	Artur Kartashyan	7	0	0	0	7	0
4	(Armenia)	DF	Erik Smbatyan	1	0	0	0	1	0
6	(Colombia)	DF	Jefferson Granado	6	0	0	0	6	0
7	(Armenia)	FW	Martin Grigoryan	1	1	1	0	2	1
8	(Armenia)	MF	Aram Kocharyan	2	0	0	0	2	0
9	(Armenia)	MF	Artur Israelyan	2	0	0	0	2	0
10	(Armenia)	DF	Tigran Sargsyan	1	0	0	0	1	0
11	(Haiti)	FW	Jonel Désiré	1	0	1	0	2	0
14	(Armenia)	DF	Aventis Aventisian	2	1	0	0	2	1
17	(Armenia)	DF	Tigran Ayunts	3	0	0	0	3	0
19	(Nigeria)	FW	Ibrahim Yusuf	3	0	1	0	4	0
22	(Haiti)	DF	Alex Junior	4	0	0	0	4	0
32	(Nigeria)	MF	Nwabueze Uzochukwu Paschal	1	0	0	0	1	0
33	(Ecuador)	FW	Yeison Racines	3	0	0	0	3	0
36	(Armenia)	FW	Vahram Makhsudyan	6	0	1	0	7	0
59	(Jamaica)	DF	Romain Blake	3	1	0	0	3	1
66	(Nigeria)	MF	Suleiman Idris	3	1	0	0	3	1
80	(Nigeria)	FW	Izuchukwu Chimezie	2	0	0	0	2	0
88	(Montenegro)	GK	Andrija Dragojević	3	0	0	0	3	0
Players away on loan:
Players who left West Armenia during the season:
5	(Armenia)	DF	Armen Sargsyan	2	1	1	0	3	1
7	(Mali)	FW	Hadji Dramé	3	0	0	0	3	0
11	(Russia)	FW	Zakhar Tarasenko	1	0	0	0	1	0
16	(Portugal)	DF	Braima Candé	1	0	0	0	1	0
25	(Kazakhstan)	DF	Timur Rudoselsky	5	0	0	0	5	0
			TOTALS	73	5	6	0	79	5
