= Billen =

Billen is a surname. Notable people with the surname include:

- Andrew Billen (born 1957), British journalist and children's author
- Magali Billen, Belgian-born American geophysicist
- Mathieu Billen (born 1953), Belgian association football player for Royal Standard de Liège
- Matthias Billen (1910–1989), German footballer
- Michael Billen (1955–2022), German politician
- Valère Billen (born 1952), Belgian football coach
