= Huesca (disambiguation) =

Huesca is a city in northeastern Spain.

Huesca also may refer to:

== Places ==
- Casbas de Huesca, a municipality in northeastern Spain
- Province of Huesca, a province in northeastern Spain

== People ==
- Abu Taur of Huesca (fl. 8th century), Muslim nobleman
- Carlos Daniel López Huesca (born 1990), or Carlitos, Spanish footballer
- Diego Huesca (born 2000), Paraguayan footballer
- Durand of Huesca (c. 1160–1224), Spanish Waldensian
- Estanislao Medina Huesca (born 1990), Equatorial Guinean writer
- Rubén López Huesca (born 1995), or Rubio, Spanish footballer
- Vincent of Saragossa (died c. 304), or Vincent of Huesca, Spanish saint and martyr
- Rosendo Huesca Pacheco (1932–2017), Mexican Catholic prelate

== Sports ==
- BM Huesca, Spanish handball team
- CB Peñas Huesca, Spanish basketball team
- SD Huesca, Spanish football club

== Transportation ==
- Huesca–Pirineos Airport, also known as Huesca Airport, an airport in the province of Huesca in Spain
- Huesca railway station, a railway station that serves Huesca, Spain

== Other ==
- Huesca, a Spanish Navy destroyer which previously served as the Italian cruiser Alessandro Poerio
- Huesca Cathedral, a Roman Catholic cathedral in Huesca, Spain
- Huesca Offensive, a 1937 military operation of the Spanish Civil War
- Bell of Huesca, an Aragonese legend

== See also ==
- List of municipalities in Huesca
- Rodrigo Huescas (b. 2003), Mexican footballer
