= Bilen (surname) =

Bilen is a surname. Notable people with the surname include:

- Eren Bilen (born 2000), Turkish footballer
- İsmail Bilen (1902–1983), Turkish politician
- Mario Bilen (born 1985), Croatian footballer

== See also ==
- Billen
