= Bilen =

Bilen may refer to:

- Bilen people
- Bilen language
- Bilen (surname)
