= Braima Candé =

Portuguese footballer

Personal information
- Full name: Braima Candé
- Date of birth: 4 September 1995 (age 31)
- Place of birth: Bissau, Guinea-Bissau
- Height: 1.82 m (5 ft 11 1/2 in)
- Position: Right back

Team information
- Current team: West Armenia
- Number: 16

Youth career
- 2011–2014: Sporting

Senior career*
Years	Team	Apps	(Gls)
2014–2016	Porto B	0	(0)
2015	→ Freamunde (loan)	0	(0)
2015–2016	→ Mirandela (loan)	29	(2)
2016	Pedras Salgadas	0	(0)
2017–2019	Kallithea	34	(0)
2019–2020	Inter Leipzig	29	(0)
2021	Kallithea	17	(0)
2021–2022	Irodotos	27	(0)
2023	Džiugas	11	(0)
2023	Knattspyrnufélagið Ægir	7	(0)
2024	FCB Magpies	5	(0)
2024–	West Armenia	6	(0)

International career
2014	Portugal U19	4	(1)
- * Club domestic league appearances and goals as of 11 December 2024

Braima Candé (born 4 September 1995) is a Bissau-Guinean-born Portuguese professional footballer who plays as a right back for Armenian Premier League club West Armenia.

== Club career ==
On 26 March 2017, Candé made his professional debut with Kallithea in a Greece Football League match against OFI.
