= Aram Voskanyan =

Armenian footballer (born 1975)

Personal information
- Date of birth: 26 August 1975 (age 51)
- Place of birth: Sevan, Armenian SSR, Soviet Union
- Height: 1.79 m (5 ft 10 in)
- Position: Forward

Senior career*
Years	Team	Apps	(Gls)
1991–1993	Malatia	57	(17)
1993–1994	Banants	12	(10)
1995–1998	Ararat Yerevan	81	(30)
1999–2000	Lokomotiv St. Petersburg	37	(11)
2000–2001	Baltika Kaliningrad	20	(1)
2001–2002	Pyunik	23	(10)
2002–2003	Baltika Kaliningrad	11	(0)
2003–2004	Mika	10	(8)
2004–2008	Esil Bogatyr	130	(37)
2008–2010	Mika	29	(14)
2010	Lokomotiv Tashkent	12	(3)
2010–2011	Mika	12	(0)

International career
2004–2006	Armenia	10	(0)

Managerial career
- 2012–2013: Mika (assistant)
- 2013–2015: Mika
- 2015: Banants
- 2015–2016: Banants (assistant)
- 2016: Armenia U19
- 2016–2017: Alashkert
- 2017–2018: Banants
- 2018–2019: Alashkert
- 2020–2021: Atyrau
- 2022: Alashkert
- 2022: Ararat Yerevan
- 2023–2025: Syunik
- * Club domestic league appearances and goals

Aram Voskanyan (Armenian: Արամ Ոսկանյան; born 26 August 1975) is an Armenian football manager and former player who manages Ararat Yerevan.

== Playing career ==
A striker, Aram was a member of the Armenia national team, and has participated in 10 international matches since his debut in a home 2006 World Cup qualification match against Romania on 17 November 2004.

== Managerial career ==
On 8 December 2015, Voskanyan was appointed head coach of the Armenia U19 national team.

On 13 January 2022, Alashkert announced Voskanyan as their new head coach.

On 1 June 2022, Ararat Yerevan announced Voskanyan as their new head coach.

On 4 July 2023, Syunik announced Voskanyan as their new head coach.
