= Maksim Khachatryan =

Russian footballer

Personal information
- Full name: Maksim Borisovich Khachatryan
- Date of birth: 30 January 2004 (age 22)
- Place of birth: Saint Petersburg, Russia
- Height: 1.76 m (5 ft 9 in)
- Position: Midfielder

Team information
- Current team: Syunik
- Number: 12

Youth career
- 2011–2012: Zenit Saint Petersburg
- 2012–2015: SDYuSShOR Zenit Saint Petersburg
- 2016–2018: DYuSSh Kolomyagi Saint Petersburg
- 2018–2021: SShOR Zenit Saint Petersburg
- 2021–2022: Sochi

Senior career*
Years	Team	Apps	(Gls)
2022	Tver	19	(1)
2023	Irtysh Omsk	0	(0)
2023	Tver	16	(1)
2024	Zvezda Saint Petersburg	14	(0)
2024	Slavia Mozyr	7	(0)
2025–	Syunik	0	(0)
- * Club domestic league appearances and goals as of 31 July 2025

Maksim Borisovich Khachatryan (Russian: Максим Борисович Хачатрян; born 30 January 2004) is a Russian and Armenian professional footballer who plays as a midfielder for Syunik.

== Career ==
He made his debut in the Russian Second League for Tver on 17 July 2022, in a game against Torpedo-2.

He made his debut in the Belarusian Premier League for Slavia Mozyr on 3 August 2024 in a game against Dnepr Mogilev.
