= Alex Junior Christian =

Haitian footballer (born 1993)

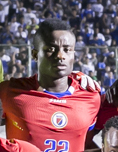
- Christian with Haiti in 2017

Personal information
- Full name: Alex Junior Christian
- Date of birth: 5 December 1993 (age 32)
- Place of birth: Port-au-Prince, Haiti
- Height: 1.83 m (6 ft 0 in)
- Position: Left-back

Team information
- Current team: Araks Ararat FC
- Number: 22

Youth career
- Jacot Football Passion

Senior career*
| Years | Team | Apps | (Gls) |
| 2012–2013 | Violette | 16 | (0) |
| 2014 | Ironbound Soul | 12 | (5) |
| 2014–2015 | Vila Real | 11 | (3) |
| 2015–2017 | Boavista | 0 | (0) |
| 2015–2016 | → Vila Real (loan) | 19 | (1) |
| 2016–2017 | → A.D. Camacha (loan) | 25 | (1) |
| 2017–2019 | Gandzasar Kapan | 41 | (9) |
| 2019–2021 | Ararat-Armenia | 34 | (2) |
| 2021 | Atyrau | 19 | (1) |
| 2022 | Taraz | 21 | (0) |
| 2023 | Telavi | 12 | (0) |
| 2023 | Aksu | 8 | (0) |
| 2024–2025 | West Armenia | 20 | (0) |
| 2025–2026 | Hayk | 28 | (1) |
| 2026– | Araks Ararat FC | 3 | (0) |

International career^{‡}
| 2015 | Haiti U23 | 6 | (1) |
| 2015– | Haiti | 52 | (2) |
- * Club domestic league appearances and goals as of 6 December 2025 ‡ National team caps and goals as of 17 November 2021

Alex Junior Christian (born 5 December 1993) is a Haitian professional footballer who plays as a left-back for Araks Ararat FC and the Haiti national team.

== Club career ==
Alex Christian began his career with Haitian Premier League Side Violette. After a few years with Violette, he moved overseas and joined American semi-pro side Ironbound SC. After a few games with Ironbound, he earned a move to Portugal and was signed by Vila Real.

In January 2015, Christian signed a six-month contract with Vila Real, before joining Boavista in June 2015 until the summer of 2018.

In June 2017, Christian signed for Armenian Premier League club FC Gandzasar Kapan on a one-year contract.

On 11 January 2019, Christian signed for FC Ararat-Armenia. On 21 January 2021, Ararat-Armenia confirmed that Christian had left the club following the expiration of his contract.

On 5 August 2024, Christian return to the Armenian Premier League to sign for West Armenia.

== International career ==
On 16 May 2019, Christian was named in Haiti's 40-man provisional squad for the 2019 CONCACAF Gold Cup. On 23 May 2019, Christian was confirmed in the final squad.

== Career statistics ==
=== Club ===
As of match played 23 April 2025

Appearances and goals by club, season and competition
| Club | Season | League | | | National cup | | League cup | | Continental | | Other | | Total | |
| Club | Season | Division | Apps | Goals | Apps | Goals | Apps | Goals | Apps | Goals | Apps | Goals | Apps | Goals |
|---|---|---|---|---|---|---|---|---|---|---|---|---|---|---|
| Vila Real | 2014–15 | Campeonato de Portugal | 9 | 0 | 0 | 0 | – | | – | | – | | 9 | 0 |
| Boavista | 2015–16 | Primeira Liga | 0 | 0 | 0 | 0 | 0 | 0 | – | | – | | 2 | 0 |
| Boavista | 2016–17 | Primeira Liga | 0 | 0 | 0 | 0 | 0 | 0 | – | | – | | 2 | 0 |
| Boavista | Total | | 0 | 0 | 0 | 0 | 0 | 0 | – | | – | | 0 | 0 |
| Vila Real (loan) | 2015–16 | Campeonato de Portugal | 19 | 0 | 0 | 0 | – | | – | | – | | 19 | 0 |
| AD Camacha (loan) | 2016–17 | Campeonato de Portugal | 23 | 0 | 1 | 0 | – | | – | | – | | 24 | 0 |
| Gandzasar Kapan | 2017–18 | Armenian Premier League | 27 | 8 | 3 | 1 | – | | 2 | 0 | – | | 32 | 9 |
| Gandzasar Kapan | 2018–19 | Armenian Premier League | 14 | 1 | 2 | 0 | – | | 2 | 0 | 1 | 0 | 19 | 1 |
| Gandzasar Kapan | Total | | 41 | 9 | 5 | 1 | – | | 4 | 0 | 1 | 0 | 51 | 10 |
| Ararat-Armenia | 2018–19 | Armenian Premier League | 11 | 0 | 2 | 0 | – | | – | | – | | 13 | 0 |
| Ararat-Armenia | 2019–20 | Armenian Premier League | 19 | 0 | 4 | 0 | – | | 2 | 0 | 1 | 0 | 26 | 0 |
| Ararat-Armenia | 2020–21 | Armenian Premier League | 4 | 0 | 0 | 0 | – | | 1 | 0 | 1 | 0 | 6 | 0 |
| Ararat-Armenia | Total | | 34 | 0 | 4 | 0 | – | | 3 | 0 | 2 | 0 | 45 | 0 |
| Atyrau | 2021 | Kazakhstan Premier League | 19 | 1 | 3 | 0 | - | | - | | - | | 22 | 1 |
| Taraz | 2022 | Kazakhstan Premier League | 21 | 0 | 7 | 1 | - | | - | | - | | 28 | 1 |
| Telavi | 2023 | Erovnuli Liga | 7 | 0 | 0 | 0 | - | | - | | - | | 7 | 0 |
| Aksu | 2023 | Kazakhstan Premier League | 8 | 0 | 0 | 0 | - | | - | | - | | 8 | 0 |
| West Armenia | 2024–25 | Armenia Premier League | 20 | 0 | 3 | 0 | - | | - | | - | | 23 | 0 |
| Career total | | | 201 | 10 | 25 | 1 | 0 | 0 | 7 | 0 | 3 | 0 | 236 | 12 |

=== International ===
As of match played 15 October 2023

Appearances and goals by national team and year
| National team | Year | Apps | Goals |
|---|---|---|---|
| Haiti | 2015 | 3 | 0 |
| Haiti | 2016 | 4 | 0 |
| Haiti | 2017 | 6 | 0 |
| Haiti | 2018 | 4 | 0 |
| Haiti | 2019 | 13 | 0 |
| Haiti | 2020 | 0 | 0 |
| Haiti | 2021 | 7 | 0 |
| Haiti | 2022 | 5 | 1 |
| Haiti | 2023 | 10 | 0 |
| Total | | 52 | 1 |

== Honours ==
Gandzasar

- Armenian Cup: 2017–18

Ararat-Armenia

- Armenian Premier League: 2018–19, 2019–20
- Armenian Supercup: 2019
