= 2022–23 Armenian First League =

Armenian First League
- Season: 2022–23
- Dates: 3 August 2022 – 28 May 2023
- Champions: West Armenia

The 2022–23 Armenian First League season was the 31st since its establishment. The season began 3 August 2022 and finished 28 May 2023.

== Stadiums and locations ==
Locations of the 2022–23 Armenian First League teams

Club	Location	Stadium	Capacity
Alashkert-2	Yerevan (Shengavit)	Alashkert Stadium	6,850
Ararat-Armenia-2	Yerevan	Yerevan Football Academy	n/a
Ararat-Yerevan-2	Yerevan		
BKMA Yerevan-2	Yerevan	Vagharshapat Football Academy	300
Gandzasar	Kapan	Gandzasar Stadium	3,500
Lernayin Artsakh-2	Sisian	Sisian City Stadium	500
Mika	Yerevan		
Pyunik Academy	Yerevan	Pyunik Stadium	780
Shirak-2	Gyumri	Gyumri City Stadium	2,844
Syunik	Kapan		
Urartu-2	Yerevan	Urartu Training Centre	500
West Armenia	Yerevan	Junior Sport Stadium	1,118

== League table ==
Pos	Team	Pld	W	D	L	GF	GA	GD	Pts	Promotion
1	West Armenia	33	23	6	4	85	34	+51	75	Promotion to the Armenian Premier League
2	BKMA Yerevan-2	33	23	3	7	81	30	+51	72	
3	Gandzasar	33	22	4	7	85	33	+52	70	
4	Ararat Yerevan-2	33	19	3	11	65	48	+17	60	
5	Ararat-Armenia-2	33	18	4	11	65	52	+13	58	
6	Urartu-2	33	13	7	13	61	57	+4	46	
7	Pyunik Academy	33	14	3	16	57	55	+2	45	
8	Shirak-2	33	13	5	15	39	38	+1	44	
9	Syunik	33	12	2	19	49	52	−3	38	
10	Mika	33	11	3	19	35	77	−42	36	
11	Alashkert-2	33	8	2	23	47	99	−52	26	
12	Lernayin Artsakh-2	33	0	2	31	18	112	−94	2	

Updated to match(es) played on 28 May 2023. Source:
Rules for classification: 1) Points; 2) Play-off (only if deciding champion); 3) Matches won; 4) Head-to-head points; 5) Head-to-head matches won; 6) Head-to-head goal difference; 7) Head-to-head goals scored; 8) Head-to-head away goals scored; 9) Goal difference; 10) Goals scored.

== Statistics ==
=== Top scorers ===
As of match played 28 May 2023

Rank	Player	Club	Goals
1	(Armenia) Alen Karapetyan	Gandzasar Kapan	24
2	(Armenia) Vrezh Chiloyan	Pyunik Academy	19
3	(Egypt) Saleh Nasr	Gandzasar Kapan	16
4	(Nigeria) Charles Mark Ikechukwu	West Armenia	14
4	(Armenia) Hamlet Minasyan	BKMA Yerevan-2	14
6	(Armenia) Ashot Kocharyan	Ararat Yerevan-2	14
6	(Armenia) Arayik Eloyan	BKMA Yerevan-2	14
8	(Armenia) Yuri Kolozyan	Ararat-Armenia-2	11
8	(Armenia) Aram Loretsyan	West Armenia	11
10	(Ivory Coast) Armand Dagrou	Ararat Yerevan-2	10
