= FC Syunik =

Armenian football club

- Full name: Football Club Syunik
- Founded: 2022; 4 years ago
- Ground: Gandzasar Stadium, Kapan
- Capacity: 3,500
- Manager: Igor Picușceac
- League: Armenian Premier League
- 2025–26: 4th of 13 (Promoted)
Home colours	Away colours

Football Club Syunik, commonly known as Syunik, is an Armenian football club from the Syunik Province.

== History ==
The club was founded on July 1, 2022 in the town of Kapan, under the name Gandzasar (not to be confused with Gandzasar Kapan FC), but changed the name to Syunik before the start of the 2022-23 Armenian First League season, for which they, along with the returning West Armenia, Mika as well as Lernayin Artsakh (the latter of which had just been promoted to the Armenian Premier League, therefore registering a reserve team), had applied and got licensed. In 2025, they were licensed for and achieved promotion to the Armenian Premier League, but decided not to compete and therefore stayed in the First League.

=== Crests ===
The current crest, 2023–

=== Domestic history ===
Season	League									National Cup	Top goalscorer		Manager
Season	Div.	Pos.	Pl.	W	D	L	GS	GA	P	National Cup	Name	Goals	Manager
2022–23	Armenian First League	9th	33	12	2	19	49	52	38	First Round			Aram Voskanyan
2023–24	Armenian First League	2nd	28	20	3	5	62	24	63	Second Round	Hamlet Minasyan	14	Aram Voskanyan
2024–25	Armenian First League	2nd	24	19	4	1	64	13	61	Second Round	Hamlet Minasyan	21	Aram Voskanyan
2025–26	Armenian First League	4th	30	22	1	7	83	26	67	Quarter-final	Armen Hovhannisyan	12	Ashot Manucharyan

== Stadium ==
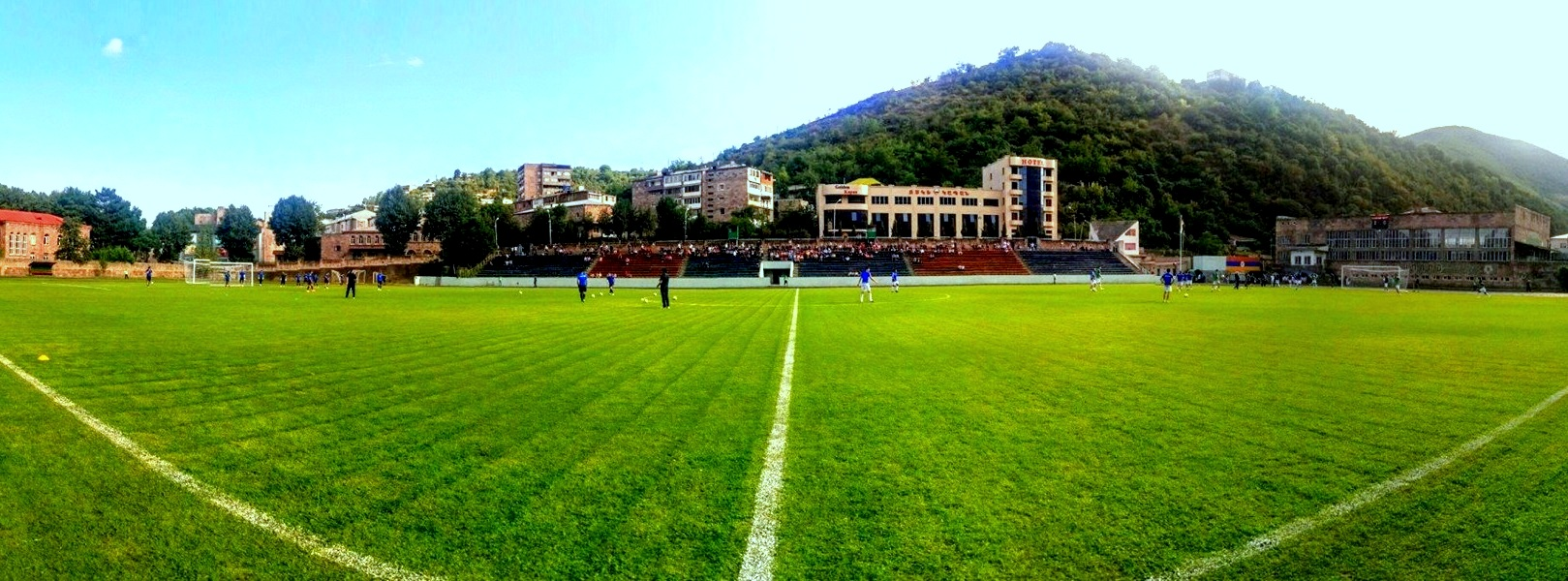
Gandzasar Stadium

The Gandzasar Stadium is the home venue of FC Syunik.

== Players ==
=== Current squad ===
As of 26 August 2026

Note: Flags indicate national team as defined under FIFA eligibility rules; some limited exceptions apply. Players may hold more than one non-FIFA nationality.

No.	Pos.	Nation	Player
1	GK	ARM	Mihran Hovhannisyan
2	DF	ARM	Arsen Galstyan
3	DF	ARM	Gor Arakelyan
4	DF	TUN	Amanallah Souassi
5	MF	ARM	Gagik Gevorgyan
6	MF	ARM	Erik Vardanyan
7	FW	BRA	Kaique Santos
8	MF	ARM	Armen Tsatryan
9	FW	ARM	Armen Hovhannisyan
10	MF	ARM	Suren Arakelyan
11	MF	ARM	Edgar Grigoryan
12	MF	RUS	Maksim Khachatryan
13	DF	ARM	Alen Karapetyan
17	MF	ARM	Erik Soghomonyan
18	MF	ARM	Artyom Avagyan

No.	Pos.	Nation	Player
19	FW	ARM	Samvel Sargsyan
20	DF	ARM	Perch Poghikyan
21	FW	GHA	Rabbi Annor
23	MF	GHA	Kobbie Jones Enning
24	MF	ARM	Davit Barseghyan
27	MF	ARM	Suren Harutyunyan
29	FW	ANG	João Brito
30	FW	NGR	Godwin Kalu
31	FW	NGR	Godswill Odinakachi
33	MF	ARM	Vahagn Hayrapetyan
55	DF	MDA	Artiom Litveacov
72	GK	POR	Diogo Sá
77	DF	POR	Miguel Silva
90	GK	ARM	Arman Ghukasyan
99	MF	ARM	Petros Afajanyan

== Managers ==
- (Armenia) Aram Voskanyan (2022–present)

== See also ==
- Football in Armenia
- Football Federation of Armenia
