= Majid Nasiri =

Iranian footballer

Seyed Majid Nassiri
Personal information
- Date of birth: 14 May 2000 (age 26)
- Place of birth: Kordkuy, Iran
- Height: 1.77 m (5 ft 10 in)
- Position: Defender

Team information
- Current team: Fajr Sepasi
- Number: 5

Senior career*
Years	Team	Apps	(Gls)
2019–2020	Gol Reyhan	7	(0)
2020–2026	Mes Rafsanjan	88	(2)
2026–	Fajr Sepasi	10	(0)

International career^{‡}
2017–2018	Iran U17	4	(0)
2022–2023	Iran U23	5	(0)
- * Club domestic league appearances and goals as of 01:42, 18 October 2023 (UTC) ‡ National team caps and goals as of 01:42, 18 October 2023 (UTC)

Seyed Majid Nassiri (Persian: سید مجید نصیری; born 14 May 2000) is an Iranian footballer who plays as a defender for Persian Gulf Pro League side Fajr Sepasi.

== Club career ==
Nasiri started his career playing in the Azadegan League with Gol Reyhan Alborz F.C. for the 2019–2020 season, after which he signed to play with Mes Rafsanjan F.C. in the Persian Gulf Pro League.

== International career ==
Nasiri played on the Iran national under-17 football team in 2017 and the under-23 team in 2022.

== Career statistics ==
As of 17 October 2023
Club	Season	League		
Club	Season	Division	Apps	Goals
Gol Reyhan	2019-20	Azadegan League	0	0
Mes Rafsanjan	2020-21	Persian Gulf Pro League	3	1
Mes Rafsanjan	2021-22	Persian Gulf Pro League	27	1
Mes Rafsanjan	2022-23	Persian Gulf Pro League	11	0
Mes Rafsanjan	2023-24	Persian Gulf Pro League	3	0
Career total			44	2
