= Magomed Estamirov =

Russian footballer

Personal information
- Full name: Magomed Yunusovich Estamirov
- Date of birth: 5 July 2004 (age 22)
- Place of birth: Ordzhonikidzevskaya, Ingushetia, Russia
- Height: 1.81 m (5 ft 11 in)
- Position: Midfielder

Youth career
- –2020: FSh Magomeda Ozdoyeva

Senior career*
Years	Team	Apps	(Gls)
2021–2023	Angusht Nazran (amateur)		
2024	Angusht Nazran	29	(0)
2025	West Armenia	4	(0)
- * Club domestic league appearances and goals as of 16 May 2025

Magomed Yunusovich Estamirov (Russian: Магомед Юнусович Эстамиров; born 5 July 2004) is a Russian footballer who plays as a midfielder.

== Club career ==
He made his professional debut in the Russian Second League for Angusht Nazran on 6 April 2024 in a game against Rostov-2.

He made his debut in the Armenian Premier League for West Armenia on 24 February 2025 in a game against Noah.
