= Berk Çetin =

Turkish footballer

Personal information
- Date of birth: 2 February 2000 (age 26)
- Place of birth: Würselen, Germany
- Height: 1.83 m (6 ft 0 in)
- Position: Defender

Team information
- Current team: Somaspor
- Number: 7

Youth career
- Alemannia Aachen
- 2013–2019: Borussia Mönchengladbach

Senior career*
Years	Team	Apps	(Gls)
2019–2020	Borussia Mönchengladbach II	1	(0)
2020–2022	Kasımpaşa	0	(0)
2020–2021	→ Helmond Sport (loan)	3	(0)
2021–2022	→ Turgutluspor (loan)	4	(0)
2022	→ Dornbirn (loan)	6	(0)
2022–2023	Olympic Charleroi	0	(0)
2023–2026	Manisaspor		
2026–	Somaspor	4	(0)

International career^{‡}
2015	Germany U16	1	(0)
2016–2017	Turkey U17	13	(0)
2018	Turkey U19	1	(0)
- * Club domestic league appearances and goals as of 1 October 2026 ‡ National team caps and goals as of 22 January 2020

Berk Çetin (born 2 February 2000) is a professional footballer who plays as a defender for Somaspor. He was born in Germany and represented both Germany and Turkey on junior levels.

== Career ==
On 18 January 2020, Çetin signed with Kasımpaşa from Borussia Mönchengladbach. Çetin made his professional debut with Kasımpaşa in a 3–2 Turkish Cup win over Alanyaspor on 22 January 2020.

On 2 October 2020, Çetin joined Dutch Eerste Divisie club Helmond Sport on a season-long loan. He was recalled from the loan early in 2021, but remained on the bench in all remaining 2020–21 Süper Lig games for Kasımpaşa.

On 8 September 2021, he moved on a new loan to Turgutluspor. On 3 February 2022, Çetin joined Dornbirn in Austria on loan.
