= Michael Billen =

German politician (1955–2022)

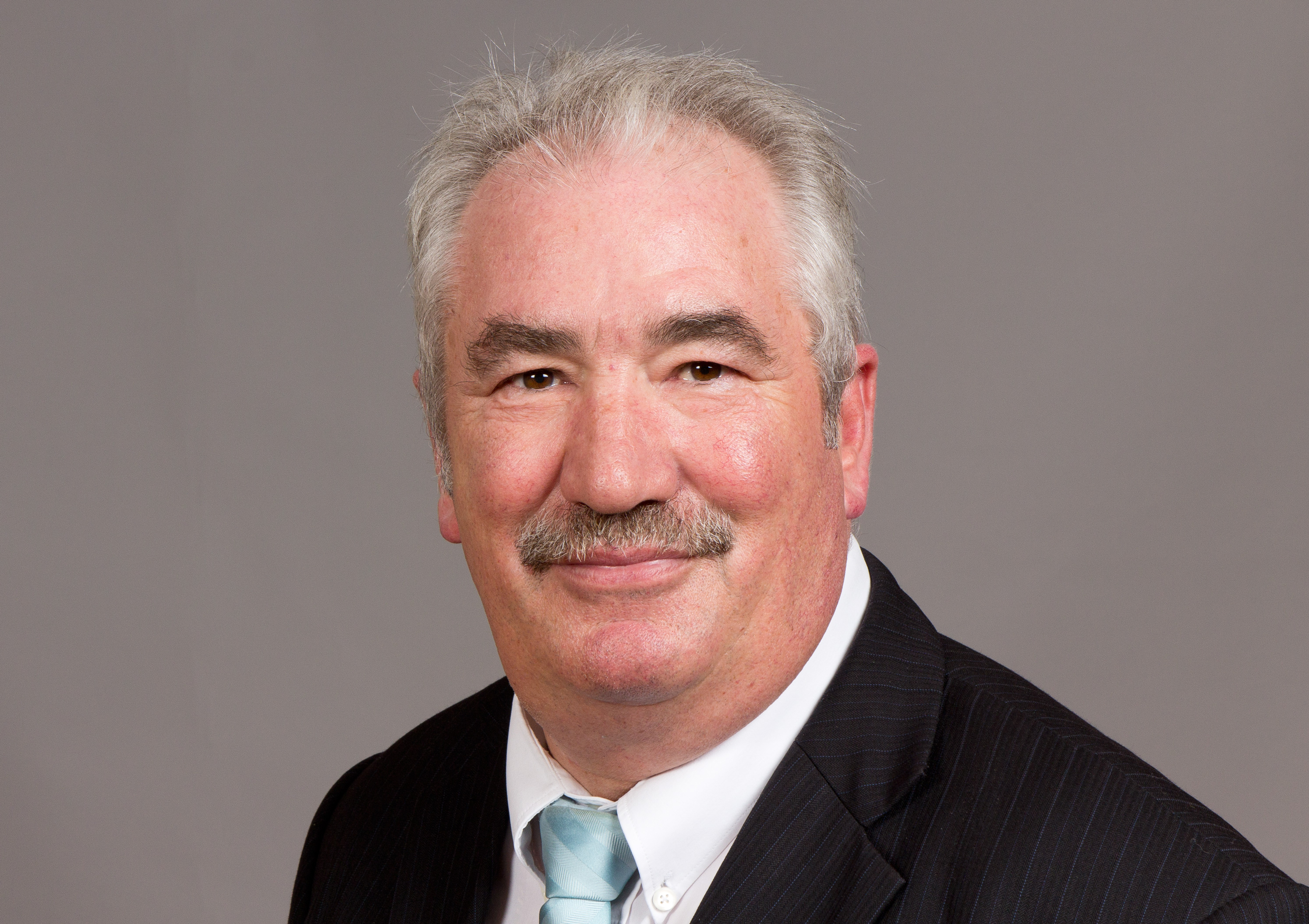
- Billen in 2014

Member of the Landtag of Rhineland-Palatinate
- In office 20 May 1996 – 18 May 2020

Personal details
- Born: 4 October 1955 Trier, Rhineland-Palatinate, West Germany
- Died: 4 January 2022 (aged 66)
- Party: CDU

Michael Billen (4 October 1955 – 4 January 2022) was a German politician. A member of the Christian Democratic Union of Germany, he served in the Landtag of Rhineland-Palatinate from 1996 to 2020. Billen died of leukemia on 4 January 2022, at the age of 66.
