= Hadji Dramé =

Mailan football player

Personal information
- Date of birth: 10 September 2000 (age 26)
- Place of birth: Bamako, Mali
- Height: 1.68 m (5 ft 6 in)
- Position: Forward

Team information
- Current team: AP Brera Strumica
- Number: 77

Senior career*
Years	Team	Apps	(Gls)
2020–2021	Paide Linnameeskond	30	(4)
2021	→ Paide Linnameeskond II	13	(4)
2022	Dila Gori	25	(3)
2023–2025	West Armenia	31	(3)
2025–	AP Brera Strumica	10	(0)

International career
2017	Mali U-17	11	(6)
2019	Mali U-20	8	(1)
- * Club domestic league appearances and goals as of 1 June 2025

Hadji Dramé (born 10 September 2000) is a Malian footballer who plays as a winger or forward for Macedonian First League club AP Brera Strumica.

== Early life ==
Growing up, Dramé idolized Neymar and Cristiano Ronaldo. As a youth player, he won the 2014 audition to join Aspire Academy. However, he did not join Aspire Academy due to family reasons.

== Career ==
=== Club career ===
Dramé started his career at Malian side Yeelen Olympique. After that, he trialed for Olympique Lyonnais in the French Ligue 1. Before the 2020 season, Dramé signed for Estonian club Paide, helping them win the 2022 Estonian Cup, their first major trophy. During the 2020 season, he was unable to play for Paide until the second half of the season due to the coronavirus pandemic. Before the 2022 season, he signed for Dila in Georgia.

On 22 December 2023, Armenian Premier League club West Armenia announced the signing of Dramé.

=== International career ===
Dramé helped Mali win the 2016 U-16 International Dream Cup. He represented Mali at the 2017 FIFA U-17 World Cup, helping them finish fourth. He helped Mali win the 2017 U-17 Africa Cup of Nations.

== Style of play ==
Dramé can operate as a winger or attacker.

== Personal life ==
He is the son of Malian manager Djibril Dramé.
