= Matheus Stockl =

Brazilian footballer (born 2000)

Personal information
- Full name: Matheus Bungenstab Stockl
- Date of birth: 14 March 2000 (age 26)
- Place of birth: Marechal Floriano, Brazil
- Height: 1.87 m (6 ft 2 in)
- Position: Defender

Team information
- Current team: Nova Venécia

Youth career
- –2020: Atlético Mineiro

Senior career*
Years	Team	Apps	(Gls)
2021	CRB	4	(0)
2021–2022	Coimbra	0	(0)
2021–2022	→ Villa Nova (loan)	1	(0)
2022	Vitória de Setúbal	1	(0)
2023	Mixto		
2023–	Nova Venécia		

International career^{‡}
2016–2017	Brazil U17	10	(0)
- * Club domestic league appearances and goals as of 14:27, 3 June 2021 (UTC) ‡ National team caps and goals as of 14:27, 3 June 2021 (UTC)

Matheus Bungenstab Stockl (born 14 March 2000) is a Brazilian footballer who plays as a defender for Nova Venécia.

== Career statistics ==
=== Club ===
As of 3 June 2021.

Club	Season	League			State League		Cup		Other		Total	
Club	Season	Division	Apps	Goals	Apps	Goals	Apps	Goals	Apps	Goals	Apps	Goals
CRB	2021	Série B	0	0	3 (Note: Appearances in the Campeonato Alagoano)	0	0	0	1 (Note: Appearances in the Copa do Nordeste)	0	4	0
Career total			0	0	3	0	0	0	1	0	4	0
