= Magali Billen =

American geophysicist

Magali Isabelle Billen is a Belgian-born American geophysicist. She is an expert on the dynamic processes involved in the subduction of tectonic plates, and has applied that expertise to build a digital twin of the earth's interior. She works as a professor at the University of California, Davis, where she chairs the Department of Earth and Planetary Sciences.

== Education and career ==
Billen was born in Belgium; her name, Magali, is of Hungarian Romani origin but became widely known in the French-speaking world in the 1960s, when her mother was a teenager, through a popular French love song. Her parents moved from Belgium to the United States when she was an infant, and she grew up in San Diego. The 1992 Landers earthquake, when she was a high school student, woke her and woke her interest in geophysics. She entered the University of Puget Sound in Tacoma, Washington, initially intending to study civil engineering, but then switching to physics, and graduating with honors in 1995. She completed her Ph.D. in geophysics in 2001 at the California Institute of Technology, under the supervision of Mike Gurnis.

She became a postdoctoral researcher at the University of Leeds in England in 2001 and 2002, and at the Woods Hole Oceanographic Institution in Woods Hole, Massachusetts in 2002 and 2003. In 2002, she started an assistant professorship in geophysics at the University of California, Davis. She was promoted to associate professor in 2008 and full professor in 2013. In 2024 she was named as the chair of the Department of Earth and Planetary Sciences.

== Recognition ==
Billen was a 2017 recipient of the Friedrich Wilhelm Bessel Research Award.
