= Aventis Aventisian =

Armenian footballer (born 2002)

Personal information
- Date of birth: 17 August 2002 (age 24)
- Place of birth: Thessaloniki, Greece
- Height: 1.72 m (5 ft 8 in)
- Position: Left-back

Team information
- Current team: Chania
- Number: 21

Youth career
- 2009–2021: PAOK

Senior career*
Years	Team	Apps	(Gls)
2021–2022	PAOK B	0	(0)
2022–2024	Go Ahead Eagles	3	(0)
2024	→ Jarun Zagreb (loan)	11	(0)
2024–2025	West Armenia	20	(0)
2026–	Chania	8	(0)

International career^{‡}
2017	Greece U16	4	(0)
2018	Armenia U16	2	(0)
2018–2019	Greece U17	11	(0)
2023–2024	Armenia U21	9	(0)
- * Club domestic league appearances and goals as of 21 April 2026 ‡ National team caps and goals as of 15 October 2024

Aventis Aventisian (Armenian: Ավետիս Ավետիսյան; Greek: Αβεντίς Αβεντισιάν; born 17 August 2002) is a professional footballer who plays as a left-back for Super League Greece 2 club Chania. Born in Greece, he is a youth international for Armenia.

== Club career ==
On 15 February 2024, Aventisian was loaned to Jarun Zagreb in Croatia.

== International career ==
Born in Greece, Aventisian is of Armenian descent. He is a former youth international for Greece, having played for the Greece U17s. He was called up to the senior Armenia national team in November 2022.
