= Embiya Ayyıldız =

Turkish footballer (born 2000)

Personal information
- Date of birth: 5 July 2000 (age 26)
- Place of birth: Selçuklu, Turkey
- Height: 1.90 m (6 ft 3 in)
- Position: Forward

Team information
- Current team: Beyoğlu Yeni Çarşı
- Number: 9

Youth career
- 2013–2016: Konya Kadıköyspor
- 2016–2018: Altınordu

Senior career*
Years	Team	Apps	(Gls)
2018–2020	Altınordu	0	(0)
2019–2020	→ Niğde Anadolu (loan)	14	(3)
2020–2021	Ergene Velimeşe	15	(5)
2021–2022	Ankaragücü	5	(0)
2021–2022	→ Isparta 32 SK (loan)	15	(2)
2022	→ Zonguldak Kömürspor (loan)	16	(4)
2022–2023	Zonguldak Kömürspor	30	(12)
2023–	Beyoğlu Yeni Çarşı	19	(6)

International career^{‡}
2017	Turkey U17	3	(0)
2019	Turkey U19	1	(0)
- * Club domestic league appearances and goals as of 23 March 2024 ‡ National team caps and goals as of 19:27, 11 January 2022 (UTC)

Embiya Ayyıldız (born 5 July 2000) is a Turkish professional footballer who plays as a forward for Beyoğlu Yeni Çarşı.

== Professional career ==
A youth product of Altınordu, Ayyıldız began his senior career on loan with Niğde Anadolu before moving to Ergene Velimeşe in 2020. On 21 January 2021, he signed a professional contract with Ankaragücü for 2.5 years. Ayyıldız made his professional debut with Ankaragücü in a 1–1 Süper Lig tie with Denizlispor on 21 April 2021.
