= Nobuki Iketaka =

Japanese footballer

Personal information
- Date of birth: 5 April 2000 (age 26)
- Place of birth: Hokkaido, Japan
- Height: 1.73 m (5 ft 8 in)
- Position: Midfielder

Team information
- Current team: Giravanz Kitakyushu
- Number: 13

Youth career
- SSS Sapporo
- –2020: Urawa Reds

Senior career*
Years	Team	Apps	(Gls)
2019–2021	Urawa Reds	0	(0)
2020	→ Kataller Toyama (loan)	21	(0)
2021	→ Fukushima United (loan)	24	(1)
2022–	Giravanz Kitakyushu	38	(2)

International career
2017	Japan U17	8	(0)
- * Club domestic league appearances and goals as of 18:26, 5 September 2023 (UTC)

Nobuki Iketaka (池髙 暢希, Iketaka Nobuki; born 5 April 2000) is a Japanese footballer currently playing as a midfielder for Giravanz Kitakyushu.

== Career statistics ==
=== Club ===
As of 10 November 2020.

Club	Season	League			National Cup		League Cup		Other		Total	
Club	Season	Division	Apps	Goals	Apps	Goals	Apps	Goals	Apps	Goals	Apps	Goals
Urawa Red Diamonds	2019	J1 League	0	0	1 (Note: Appearance(s) in Emperor's Cup)	0	0	0	0	0	1	0
Urawa Red Diamonds	2020	J1 League	0	0	0	0	0	0	0	0	0	0
Urawa Red Diamonds	Total		0	0	1	0	0	0	0	0	1	0
Kataller Toyama (loan)	2020	J3 League	17	0	0	0	–		0	0	17	0
Career total			17	0	1	0	0	0	0	0	18	0
