= Axel Gómez =

Honduran footballer (born 2000)

Personal information
- Full name: Axel Daniel Gómez Guzmán
- Date of birth: 28 June 2000 (age 26)
- Place of birth: Tegucigalpa, Honduras
- Height: 1.75 m (5 ft 9 in)
- Position: Left back

Youth career
- –2018: Motagua

Senior career*
Years	Team	Apps	(Gls)
2018–2020	Olimpia	21	(1)

International career^{‡}
2017	Honduras U17	9	(0)
2018–	Honduras U20	13	(0)
- * Club domestic league appearances and goals as of 17:14, 12 July 2020 (UTC) ‡ National team caps and goals as of 17:14, 12 July 2020 (UTC)

Axel Daniel Gómez Guzmán (born 28 June 2000) is a Honduran professional footballer currently playing as a left-back.

== Career statistics ==
=== Club ===
As of 12 July 2020.

Club	Season	League			Cup		Continental		Other		Total	
Club	Season	Division	Apps	Goals	Apps	Goals	Apps	Goals	Apps	Goals	Apps	Goals
Olimpia	2017–18	Liga Salva-Vida	8	0	0	0	–		0	0	8	0
Olimpia	2018–19	Liga Salva-Vida	7	0	0	0	–		0	0	7	0
Olimpia	2019–20	Liga Salva-Vida	6	1	0	0	0	0	0	0	6	1
Career total			21	1	0	0	0	0	0	0	21	1
