= Brayan Gómez =

Colombian footballer (born 2000)

Personal information
- Full name: Brayan Arley Gómez Ramírez
- Date of birth: 29 January 2000 (age 26)
- Place of birth: Medellín, Colombia
- Height: 1.63 m (5 ft 4 in)
- Position: Attacking midfielder

Youth career
- –2019: Atlético Nacional

Senior career*
Years	Team	Apps	(Gls)
2019	Atlético Nacional	0	(0)
2020–2021	Deportivo Pasto	0	(0)
2021	Real Monarchs	3	(0)
2023	Jaguares de Córdoba	0	(0)
2023–2024	Orsomarso	11	(2)

International career^{‡}
2017	Colombia U17	8	(0)
- * Club domestic league appearances and goals as of 7 November 2021 ‡ National team caps and goals as of 13 June 2021

Brayan Arley Gómez Ramírez (born 29 January 2000) is a Colombian professional footballer who plays as an attacking midfielder.

== Club career ==
Gómez began his career with Atlético Nacional, before moving to Deportivo Pasto in search of first team football. In January 2021, it was announced Gómez had joined USL Championship side Real Monarchs SLC, with Deportivo Pasto keeping 50% of the player's rights for any future sale.

== International career ==
Gómez was part of the Colombia under-17 team at the 2017 FIFA U-17 World Cup squad, appearing in all three group stage matches. In the 2017 U-17 South American Championships, he also tallied two assists in five appearances to help Colombia to a fourth-place finish.
