= Matthias Billen =

German footballer

Personal information
- Date of birth: 29 March 1910
- Date of death: 1 July 1989 (aged 79)
- Position: Forward

Senior career*
Years	Team	Apps	(Gls)
1936–1948	VfL Osnabrück		

International career
1936	Germany	1	(0)
- * Club domestic league appearances and goals

Matthias Billen (29 March 1910 – 1 July 1989) was a German international footballer.
