= Diego Huesca =

Paraguayan footballer (born 2000)

Personal information
- Full name: Diego Sebastián Huesca Colmán
- Date of birth: 8 August 2000 (age 26)
- Place of birth: Encarnación, Paraguay
- Height: 1.84 m (6 ft 0 in)
- Position: Goalkeeper

Team information
- Current team: Luqueño

Youth career
- Valencia

Senior career*
Years	Team	Apps	(Gls)
2017–2019	Valencia Mestalla	0	(0)
2019–2021	FC Andorra	0	(0)
2021–	Luqueño	3	(0)
- * Club domestic league appearances and goals

Diego Sebastián Huesca Colmán (born 8 August 2000) is a Paraguayan professional footballer who plays as a goalkeeper for Luqueño.

== Club career ==
Huesca started his career with the reserves of Spanish La Liga side Valencia. In 2019, he signed for FC Andorra in Andorra. In 2021, Huesca signed for Paraguayan club Luqueño. On 23 August 2021, he debuted for Luqueño during a 2–0 win over Olimpia (Asunción).

== International career ==
Huesca represented Paraguay at the 2017 FIFA U-17 World Cup.
