= Eren Bilen =

Turkish footballer

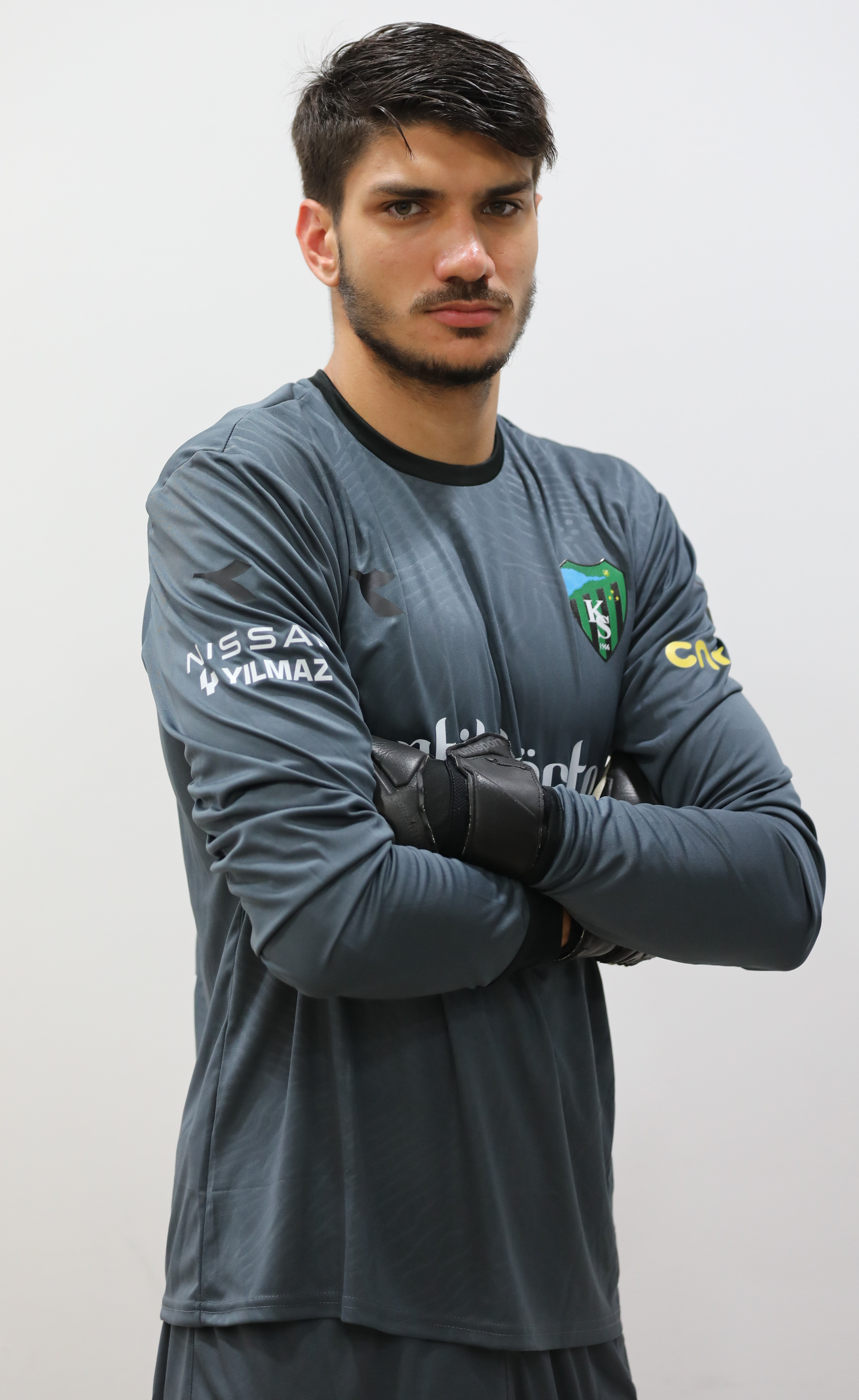

Personal information
- Date of birth: 2 December 2000 (age 25)
- Place of birth: İzmir, Turkey
- Height: 1.86 m (6 ft 1 in)
- Position: Goalkeeper

Team information
- Current team: Darıca Gençlerbirliği

Senior career*
Years	Team	Apps	(Gls)
2018–2022	Göztepe	0	(0)
2020–2021	→ Menemenspor (loan)	0	(0)
2021	→ Nevşehir Belediyespor (loan)	3	(0)
2022–	Kocaelispor	1	(0)
2023–	→ Darıca Gençlerbirliği (loan)	0	(0)

International career^{‡}
2016–2017	Turkey U17	2	(0)
2017–2018	Turkey U18	3	(0)
2019	Turkey U19	1	(0)
- * Club domestic league appearances and goals as of 23 September 2023 ‡ National team caps and goals as of 15:44, 15 December 2019 (UTC)

Eren Bilen (born 2 December 2000) is a Turkish footballer who plays as a goalkeeper for Darıca Gençlerbirliği on loan from Kocaelispor.

== Professional career ==
Bilen made his professional debut with Göztepe in a 3-3 Turkish Cup tie with Antalyaspor on 15 January 2019.

== Career statistics ==
=== Club ===
As of 15 December 2019.

Club	Season	League			Cup		Continental		Other		Total	
Club	Season	Division	Apps	Goals	Apps	Goals	Apps	Goals	Apps	Goals	Apps	Goals
Göztepe	2018–19	Süper Lig	0	0	3 (Note: Appearances in the Turkish Cup)	0	0	0	0	0	3	0
Göztepe	2019–20	Süper Lig	0	0	0	0	0	0	0	0	0	0
Career total			0	0	3	0	0	0	0	0	3	0
