= FC West Armenia =

Armenian football club

West Armenia
- Full name: Football Club West Armenia
- Founded: 2019; 7 years ago
- Dissolved: May 2025; 1 year ago
- Ground: Junior Sport Stadium, Yerevan
- Capacity: 1,188
- Owner: Sirmium Sports
- President: Robert Bassili
- Manager: Patrik Papyan
- 2024–25: Armenian Premier League, 11th (Relegated)
Home colours	Away colours

Football Club West Armenia (Armenian: Ֆուտբոլային Ակումբ Վեստ Արմենիա), was an Armenian football club based in the capital Yerevan.

== History ==
On 13 June 2019, FC West Armenia was officially founded in Yerevan by Vahe Stepanyan. In its first year of foundation, West Armenia took part in the Armenian First League. Mika Stadium was the home ground of West Armenia. On May 31, 2021, the club announced that it will no longer participate in any competition due to financial difficulties. In July 2022, along with SC Mika, Gandzasar Kapan, FC Syunik and Lernayin Artsakh-2, West Armenia were given license to participate in 2022–23 Armenian First League season. At the conclusion of the season, West Armenia were officially declared champions of 2022–23 Armenian First League and therefore promoted to 2023–24 Armenian Premier League. On 19 July 2024, Sirmium Sports acquired FC West Armenia. On 15 May 2025, the team was disqualified and removed from 2024-25 Armenian Premier League, after not showing up for the 27-th matchday fixture against Ararat-Armenia. (this was the second no-show for the club, the earlier being in Round 17 vs Pyunik, which was cancelled after West Armenia did not attend due to a protest by their players over late payment of salaries).

In addition, the “West Armenia FA” NGO was fined 2,000,000 Armenian drams (approx. US$5,155).

=== League and cup ===
Season	League										National Cup	Top goalscorer	
Season	Div.	Pos.	Pl.	W	D	L	GS	GA	GD	P	National Cup	Name	League
2019–20	Armenian First League	3	27	21	3	3	80	37	+43	66	Second round	(Russia) Sergei Orlov	31
2020–21	Armenian First League	4	27	16	2	9	71	36	+35	50	Quarterfinal	(Russia) Sergei Orlov	25
2021–22	No participation												
2022–23	Armenian First League	1	33	23	6	4	85	34	+51	75	First round	(Nigeria) Charles Mark Ikechukwu	14
2023–24	Armenian Premier League	7	36	11	4	21	43	73	-30	37	Second round	(Russia) Zakhar Tarasenko	8
2024–25	Armenian Premier League	11	30	7	2	21	22	78	-56	23	Quarter-final	(Russia) Zakhar Tarasenko	6

== Current squad ==
As of 23 February 2025

Note: Flags indicate national team as defined under FIFA eligibility rules; some limited exceptions apply. Players may hold more than one non-FIFA nationality.

No.	Pos.	Nation	Player
1	GK	ARM	Erik Lyansberg
2	DF	ARM	Artur Danielyan
3	DF	ARM	Artur Kartashyan (on loan from Alashkert)
4	DF	ARM	Erik Smbatyan
6	DF	COL	Jefferson Granado
7	FW	ARM	Martin Grigoryan
8	MF	ARM	Aram Kocharyan (captain)
9	MF	ARM	Artur Israelyan
10	DF	ARM	Tigran Sargsyan
11	FW	HAI	Jonel Désiré
14	DF	ARM	Aventis Aventisian
17	DF	ARM	Tigran Ayunts
18	DF	ARM	Arsen Yeghiazaryan
19	FW	NGA	Ibrahim Yusuf (on loan from Van)

No.	Pos.	Nation	Player
20	DF	FRA	Marco Sevilla
22	DF	HAI	Alex Junior
23	DF	ARM	Ishkhan Darbinyan (on loan from Pyunik)
27	MF	ARM	Davit Petrosyan (on loan from Ararat-Armenia)
33	FW	ECU	Yeison Racines
36	FW	ARM	Vahram Makhsudyan (on loan from Ararat-Armenia)
44	DF	COL	Juan Bravo
59	DF	JAM	Romain Blake
66	MF	NGA	Suleiman Idris
77	MF	RUS	Magomed Estamirov
80	FW	NGA	Izuchukwu Chimezie
88	GK	MNE	Andrija Dragojević
91	GK	ARM	Mkhitar Umreyan
99	DF	ARM	Davit Sargsyan

== Managerial history ==
- (Armenia) Armen Shahgeldyan (13 June 2019 – 8 August 2020)
- (Armenia) Hayk Hovhannisyan (1 December 2020 – 31 May 2021)
- (Armenia) Khoren Veranyan (01 August 2022 – 31 May 2023)
- (Armenia) Patrik Papyan (27 July 2024 – )

== See also ==
- Football in Armenia
- Football Federation of Armenia
