= 2025–26 FC Van season =

Van
2025-26 season
- Chairman: Sergei Ghukasov
- Manager: Edgar Torosyan (until 27 October); Arthur Asoyan (from 27 October)
- Stadium: City Stadium
- Premier League: 6th
- Armenian Cup: Round of 16
- Top goalscorer: League: Eriki (4); All: Eriki (4)
Home colours	Away colours

The 2025–26 season was FC Van's 6th season in Armenian Premier League.

== Season overview ==
On 8 August, Van announced the signing of Denys Dedechko.

On 27 October, after being unable to be present with the team due to personal circumstances, Edgar Torosyan left his role as head coach by mutual termination of his contract. Later the same day, Van announced Arthur Asoyan as their new head coach.

On 2 February, Van announced that Denys Dedechko had left the club after his contract was terminated by mutual agreement.

== Squad ==
As of match played 28 May 2026

Number	Name	Nationality	Position	Date of birth (age)	Signed from	Signed in	Contract ends	Apps.	Goals
Goalkeepers
1	Gor Manukyan	(Armenia)	GK	27 September 1993 (aged 32)	Alashkert	2025		9	0
45	Danila Bokov	(Russia)	GK	9 August 2002 (aged 23)	CSKA Moscow	2025		20	0
59	Hunan Gyurjinyan	(Armenia)	GK	16 January 2005 (aged 21)	Pyunik	2025		0	0
62	Lucas Arceli	(Brazil)	GK	19 April 2004 (aged 22)	Dragon City	2026		0	0
Defenders
2	Javier Torres	(Colombia)	DF	5 March 2000 (aged 26)	Itagüí Leones	2026		9	0
3	Ferreira	(Brazil)	DF	14 June 2004 (aged 21)	Atlético Goianiense	2025		15	1
4	Saba Sidamonidze	(Georgia (country))	DF	5 August 2002 (aged 23)	Unattached	2025		24	1
5	Hrayr Mkoyan	(Armenia)	DF	2 September 1986 (aged 39)	Shirak	2025		26	2
13	Alexsandro Silva	(Brazil)	DF	20 May 2007 (aged 19)	Centro Olímpico	2026		8	0
14	Henry Onwukwe	(Nigeria)	DF	3 August 2007 (aged 18)	Right2Win SA	2026		0	0
17	Nikolozi Sajaia	(Georgia (country))	DF	4 October 2005 (aged 20)	Kolkheti-1913 Poti	2026		1	0
22	Artur Zagorodnikov	(Russia)	DF	19 July 2004 (aged 21)	Krylia Sovetov-2 Samara	2026		1	0
23	Ibrahim Daniel	(Nigeria)	DF	23 March 2005 (aged 21)	Right2Win SA	2026		10	0
26	Andriy Markovych	(Ukraine)	DF	25 June 1995 (aged 30)	Ravshan Kulob	2026		11	0
30	Vahe Muradyan	(Armenia)	DF	28 January 1998 (aged 28)	Gandzasar Kapan	2025		2	0
87	Juan Perrotta	(Argentina)	DF	7 November 2001 (aged 24)	El Porvenir	2026		1	0
Midfielders
7	Petros Avetisyan	(Armenia)	MF	7 January 1996 (aged 30)	Gandzasar Kapan	2026		11	3
8	Hayk Tatosyan	(Armenia)	MF	17 August 2004 (aged 21)	on loan from Pyunik	2026	2026	10	1
10	Benik Hovhannisyan	(Armenia)	MF	1 May 1993 (aged 33)	Alashkert	2025		67	4
19	Emeka Maduka	(Nigeria)	MF	7 August 2006 (aged 19)	Right2Win SA	2026		9	1
24	Arsen Galstyan	(Armenia)	MF	18 May 2002 (aged 24)	Unattached	2026		3	0
25	Emmanuel Nnamani	(Nigeria)	MF	28 December 2005 (aged 20)	Right2Win SA	2026		3	0
29	Tigran Sargsyan	(Armenia)	MF	14 August 2003 (aged 22)	Unattached	2026		2	0
37	Hayk Rechelyan	(Armenia)	MF	9 March 2003 (aged 23)	Mika	2025		1	0
39	Gabriel Yeghiazaryan	(Armenia)	MF	27 July 2004 (aged 21)	Unattached	2025		1	0
70	Narek Manukyan	(Armenia)	MF	19 December 2003 (aged 22)	Alashkert	2025		18	1
Forwards
9	Jonel Désiré	(Haiti)	FW	12 February 1997 (aged 29)	Andranik	2026		6	0
11	Aris Karapetyan	(Armenia)	FW	24 May 2005 (aged 21)	on loan from Pyunik	2026	2026	9	1
18	Samuel Reis	(Brazil)	FW	21 September 2006 (aged 19)	Coimbra	2025		21	0
20	Maurinho	(Brazil)	FW	7 June 2005 (aged 20)	Ibrachina	2026		12	1
77	Davit Krasovski	(Georgia (country))	FW	21 December 2005 (aged 20)	Kolkheti-1913 Poti	2026		9	0
Away on loan
22	Aleks Galstyan	(Armenia)	MF	29 March 2007 (aged 19)	Ararat-Armenia	2025		2	0
Left during the season
2	Artur Daniyelyan	(Armenia)	DF	9 February 1998 (aged 28)	Fratria	2025		6	1
6	Jefferson Granado	(Colombia)	DF	9 April 2003 (aged 23)	West Armenia	2025		18	2
7	Jota	(Brazil)	FW	26 June 2003 (aged 22)	Água Santa	2025		5	1
8	Petros Afajanyan	(Armenia)	MF	31 October 1998 (aged 27)	Syunik	2025		8	2
9	Kevin Pereira	(Brazil)	FW	19 July 2006 (aged 19)	Grêmio	2025		11	0
11	Lucas Café	(Brazil)	MF	3 April 2003 (aged 23)	Novorizontino	2025		12	1
13	David Kirakosyan	(Russia)	MF	13 July 2006 (aged 19)	on loan from Sochi	2025		12	1
14	Eriki	(Brazil)	MF	6 August 2005 (aged 20)	Coimbra	2025		15	4
17	Hamlet Minasyan	(Armenia)	FW	15 January 2003 (aged 23)	Syunik	2025		3	0
19	Ibrahim Yusuf	(Nigeria)	FW	24 October 2003 (aged 22)	West Armenia	2025		9	0
20	Cedric Doh	(Ivory Coast)	FW	3 April 2001 (aged 25)	Shirak	2025		9	0
21	William Ovalle	(Colombia)	MF	26 March 2005 (aged 21)	Santa Fe	2025		0	0
23	Albert Mnatsakanyan	(Armenia)	MF	9 September 1999 (aged 26)	Gonio	2025		4	0
25	Hlib Bukhal	(Ukraine)	DF	12 November 1995 (aged 30)	Resovia	2025		11	0
28	Hollman McCormick	(Colombia)	FW	28 October 2005 (aged 20)	Torreense	2025		2	0
33	Allef	(Brazil)	FW	4 November 1994 (aged 31)	Unattached	2025		5	1
69	Denys Dedechko	(Ukraine)	MF	2 July 1987 (aged 38)	Câmpulung Muscel	2025		8	0
77	Sousa	(Brazil)	FW	9 May 2005 (aged 21)	Nacional	2025		1	0
88	James Santos	(Brazil)	DF	15 July 1995 (aged 30)	Noah	2025		15	0
99	Paulo Vitor	(Brazil)	DF	3 January 2006 (aged 20)	Legião	2025		0	0

== Transfers ==
=== In ===
Date	Position	Nationality	Name	From	Fee	Ref.
10 July 2025	DF	(Armenia)	Hrayr Mkoyan	Shirak	Undisclosed	
27 July 2025	GK	(Armenia)	Gor Manukyan	Alashkert	Undisclosed	
28 July 2025	MF	(Armenia)	Petros Afajanyan	Syunik	Undisclosed	
30 July 2025	GK	(Russia)	Danila Bokov	Unattached	Free	
30 July 2025	MF	(Armenia)	Benik Hovhannisyan	Alashkert	Undisclosed	
31 July 2025	FW	(Armenia)	Hamlet Minasyan	Syunik	Undisclosed	
2 August 2025	MF	(Armenia)	Narek Manukyan	Alashkert	Undisclosed	
3 August 2025	DF	(Brazil)	James Santos	Unattached	Free	
3 August 2025	DF	(Georgia (country))	Saba Sidamonidze	Borjomi	Undisclosed	
4 August 2025	GK	(Armenia)	Hunan Gyurjinyan	Pyunik	Undisclosed	
4 August 2025	MF	(Armenia)	Harutyun Asatryan	Mika	Undisclosed	
4 August 2025	MF	(Armenia)	Aleks Galstyan	Ararat-Armenia	Undisclosed	
4 August 2025	MF	(Armenia)	Arsen Galstyan	Alashkert	Undisclosed	
4 August 2025	FW	(Brazil)	Sousa	Nacional	Undisclosed	
8 August 2025	DF	(Colombia)	Jefferson Granado	West Armenia	Undisclosed	
8 August 2025	MF	(Armenia)	Albert Mnatsakanyan	Gonio	Undisclosed	
8 August 2025	MF	(Brazil)	Eriki	Coimbra	Undisclosed	
8 August 2025	MF	(Ukraine)	Denys Dedechko	Câmpulung Muscel	Undisclosed	
8 August 2025	FW	(Brazil)	Samuel Reis	Coimbra	Undisclosed	
14 August 2025	DF	(Brazil)	Ferreira	Atlético Goianiense	Undisclosed	
14 August 2025	DF	(Brazil)	Paulo Vitor	Legião	Undisclosed	
27 August 2025	FW	(Ivory Coast)	Cedric Doh	Shirak	Undislcosed	
28 August 2025	FW	(Brazil)	Kevin Pereira	Grêmio	Undislcosed	
30 August 2025	FW	(Brazil)	Allef	Unattached	Free	
30 August 2025	FW	(Colombia)	Hollman McCormick	Torreense	Undisclosed	
3 September 2025	DF	(Ukraine)	Hlib Bukhal	Resovia	Undisclosed	
11 September 2025	MF	(Brazil)	Lucas Café	Grêmio Novorizontino	Undisclosed	
19 September 2025	DF	(Armenia)	Artur Daniyelyan	Fratria	Undisclosed	
28 September 2025	MF	(Colombia)	William Ovalle	Santa Fe	Undisclosed	
2 February 2026	MF	(Armenia)	Arsen Galstyan	Unattached	Free	
5 February 2026	FW	(Haiti)	Jonel Désiré	Andranik	Undisclosed	
8 February 2026	DF	(Colombia)	Javier Torres	Itagüí Leones	Undisclosed	
12 February 2026	MF	(Brazil)	Maurinho	Ibrachina	Undisclosed	
20 February 2026	MF	(Armenia)	Petros Avetisyan	Gandzasar Kapan	Undisclosed	
21 February 2026	MF	(Armenia)	Alexsandro Silva	Centro Olímpico	Undisclosed	
23 February 2026	MF	(Nigeria)	Emmanuel Nnamani	Right2Win SA	Undisclosed	
24 February 2026	DF	(Nigeria)	Ibrahim Daniel	Unattached	Free	
24 February 2026	DF	(Nigeria)	Henry Onwukwe	Right2Win	Undisclosed	
24 February 2026	MF	(Nigeria)	Emeka Maduka	Right2Win SA	Undisclosed	
27 February 2026	DF	(Georgia (country))	Nikolozi Sajaia	Kolkheti-1913 Poti	Undisclosed	
27 February 2026	FW	(Georgia (country))	Davit Krasovski	Kolkheti-1913 Poti	Undisclosed	
15 March 2026	DF	(Russia)	Artur Zagorodnikov	Krylia Sovetov-2 Samara	Undisclosed	
15 March 2026	DF	(Ukraine)	Andriy Markovych	Unattached	Free	
16 March 2026	DF	(Argentina)	Juan Perrotta	El Porvenir	Undisclosed	

=== Loans in ===
Date from	Position	Nationality	Name	From	Date to	Ref.
14 August 2025	FW	(Russia)	David Kirakosyan	Sochi	19 February 2026	
18 September 2025	FW	(Brazil)	Jota	EC Água Santa	24 January 2026	
21 January 2026	MF	(Armenia)	Hayk Tatosyan	Pyunik	30 June 2026	
28 February 2026	FW	(Armenia)	Aris Karapetyan	Pyunik	30 June 2026	

=== Out ===
Date	Position	Nationality	Name	To	Fee	Ref.
13 February 2026	DF	(Colombia)	Jefferson Granado	Alashkert	Undisclosed	
18 February 2026	MF	(Brazil)	Eriki	Karpaty Lviv	Undisclosed	

=== Loans out ===
Date from	Position	Nationality	Name	From	Date to	Ref.
2 February 2026	MF	(Armenia)	Arsen Galstyan	BKMA Yerevan	30 June 2026	

=== Released ===
Date	Position	Nationality	Name	Joined	Date	Ref.
8 December 2025	DF	(Brazil)	James Santos	Pyunik	15 January 2026	
10 December 2025	MF	(Armenia)	Arsen Galstyan	Re-signed	2 February 2026	
13 December 2025	MF	(Armenia)	Petros Afajanyan	Syunik		
14 December 2025	DF	(Armenia)	Artur Danielyan			
14 December 2025	MF	(Nigeria)	Ibrahim Yusuf	Rangers International		
14 December 2025	FW	(Ivory Coast)	Cedric Doh			
31 December 2025	DF	(Brazil)	Paulo Vitor			
31 December 2025	DF	(Ukraine)	Hlib Bukhal	Ulytau		
31 December 2025	MF	(Armenia)	Harutyun Asatryan	Ararat Yerevan		
31 December 2025	MF	(Colombia)	William Ovalle			
31 December 2025	FW	(Brazil)	Allef			
31 December 2025	FW	(Brazil)	Kevin Pereira			
31 December 2025	FW	(Brazil)	Sousa			
31 December 2025	FW	(Colombia)	Hollman McCormick			
16 January 2026	MF	(Armenia)	Albert Mnatsakanyan	Luftëtari	17 January 2026	
2 February 2026	MF	(Ukraine)	Denys Dedechko			
16 February 2026	MF	(Brazil)	Lucas Café	Iberia 1999		

== Friendlies ==
	–
(UTC+4)

== Competitions ==
=== Overview ===
Competition	First match	Last match	Starting round	Final position	Record							
Competition	First match	Last match	Starting round	Final position	Pld	W	D	L	GF	GA	GD	Win %
Premier League	4 August 2025	27 May 2026	Matchday 1	6th	27	9	4	14	27	40	−13	33.33
Armenian Cup	28 October 2025	28 October 2025	Round of 16	Round of 16	1	0	0	1	0	4	−4	0.00
Total					28	9	4	15	27	44	−17	32.14

Last updated: 27 May 2026
Source: Competitions

=== Premier League ===
==== Results summary ====
Overall								Home						Away					
Pld	W	D	L	GF	GA	GD	Pts	W	D	L	GF	GA	GD	W	D	L	GF	GA	GD
0	0	0	0	0	0	0	0	0	0	0	0	0	0	0	0	0	0	0	0

Last updated: 27 May 2026.
Source: See Results

==== Results by round ====
Round	1	2	3	4	5	6	7	8	9	10	11	12	13	14	15	17	18	19	20	21	22	23	16	24	25	26	27
Ground	H	A	H	A	A	A	H	H	A	H	A	A	H	H	H	H	A	H	A	H	A	H	A	A	H	H	A
Result	D	W	L	L	D	L	W	L	L	W	L	W	W	W	D	L	L	D	W	L	L	L	L	W	W	L	L
Position																											

Updated to match(es) played on 27 May 2026. Source: See Results
A = Away; H = Home; W = Win; D = Draw; L = Loss; P = Bye

==== Results ====
4 August 2025 1	Van	0–0	Ararat-Armenia	Charentsavan
17:30 (UTC+4)	Afajanyan (yellow card) 23'; James (yellow card) 45+4'; Minasyan (yellow card) 65'; Granado (yellow card) 81'; N.Manukyan (yellow card) 84'; G.Manukyan (yellow card) 90+1'	Report	Eloyan (yellow card) 45+4'	Stadium: City Stadium; Referee: Vardan Manukyan

9 August 2025 2	Ararat Yerevan	0–1	Van	Abovyan
17:00 (UTC+4)	Marcelo (yellow card) 58'; Kante (yellow card) 90+3'	Report	Eriki 47'; Manukyan (yellow card) 79'	Stadium: Vahagn Tumasyan Stadium; Referee: Ashot Ghaltakhchyan

15 August 2025 3	Van	0–2	Urartu	Charentsavan
17:00 (UTC+4)		Report	Vardanyan 14'; Piloyan 80'; Ghazaryan (yellow card) 87'; Llovet (yellow card) 90+5'	Stadium: City Stadium; Referee: Zaven Hovhannisyan

24 September 2025 4	Noah	2–1	Van	Abovyan
19:00 (UTC+4)	Oulad Omar 26' (pen.); Muradyan (yellow card) 55'; Avanesyan (yellow card) 84'; Mulahusejnović 90+2'	Report	Ferreira (yellow card) 24'; Allef 75' (pen.)	Stadium: Vahagn Tumasyan Stadium; Referee: Sargis Khachatryan
Note: Match originally scheduled for 24 August, but postponed on 18 August.

29 August 2025 5	BKMA Yerevan	0–0	Van	Yerevan
16:00 (UTC+4)	Janoyan (yellow card) 31'; Tsarukyan (yellow card) 32'; Sargsyan (red card) 50'; Avetisyan (yellow card) 90+8'; Ghazaryan (yellow card) 90+11'	Report	Reis (yellow card) 29'; Yusuf (yellow card) 55'; Hovhannisyan (yellow card) 89'; Mkoyan (yellow card) 90+9'	Stadium: Academy Stadium; Referee: Yura Mahtesyan

12 September 2025 6	Gandzasar Kapan	1–0	Van	Yerevan
17:00 (UTC+4)	Avetisyan 18'; Petrosyan (yellow card) 33'; Kanda (yellow card) 62'; Karagulyan (yellow card) 90+7'	Report	Afajanyan (yellow card) 65'; Eriki (yellow card) 80'; Sidamonidze (yellow card) 90+8'	Stadium: Junior Stadium; Referee: Henrik Nalbandian

19 September 2025 7	Van	3–2	Shirak	Charentsavan
16:00 (UTC+4)	Danielyan 13'; Dedechko (yellow card) 44'; Café (yellow card) 55'; Sidamonidze 63'; Eriki 71'; Bokov (yellow card) 90+3'; James (yellow card) 90+4'	Report	Tarloyan 39'; Misakyan 43' (pen.) (yellow card) 54'; Tovmasyan (yellow card) 68'; Hakobyan (yellow card) 90'; Darbinyan (yellow card) 90+5'	Stadium: City Stadium; Referee: Ashot Ghaltakhchyan

29 September 2025 8	Van	1–2	Alashkert	Charentsavan
15:30 (UTC+4)	Mkoyan (yellow card) 10'; Bukhal (yellow card) 18'; Café (yellow card) 24'; Kirakosyan 45+2'	Report	Touré 6'; Matyukhin (yellow card) 41'; Macedo (yellow card) 44'; Nalbandyan 90+5' (pen.)	Stadium: City Stadium; Referee: Henrik Nalbandian

4 October 2025 9	Pyunik	5–1	Van	Abovyan
17:00 (UTC+4)	Noubissi 27', 41', 79'; Tarakhchyan 39', 48'; Almeida (yellow card) 73'	Report	Afajanyan 90' (pen.)	Stadium: Vahagn Tumasyan Stadium; Referee: Yura Mahtesyan

18 October 2025 10	Van	2–1	Pyunik	Charentsavan
15:30 (UTC+4)	Kirakosyan (yellow card) 32'; Afajanyan 45+1' (pen.); Eriki 85'	Report	Miljković (yellow card) 41' (yellow-red card) 82'; Agbalyan (yellow card) 43'; Moreno (yellow card) 50'; Noubissi 90+4'; Vakulenko (yellow card) 90+6'	Stadium: City Stadium; Referee: Vardan Manukyan

24 October 2025 11	Alashkert	1–0	Van	Armavir
15:30 (UTC+4)	Touré 2'; Gareginyan (yellow card) 32'	Report	Kirakosyan (yellow card) 32'; Eriki (yellow card) 33'; Yusuf (yellow card) 64'; Mnatsakanyan (yellow card) 69'; Bokov (yellow card) 76'	Stadium: Hakob Tonoyan Stadium; Referee: Ashot Harutyunyan

2 November 2025 12	Shirak	2–3	Van	Gyumri
19:00 (UTC+4)	Akila 22'; Akulyan (yellow card) 31' (goal) 62'; Darbinyan (yellow card) 64'; Darbinyan (yellow card) 83'	Report	Ferreira 57'; Granado 75'; Mkoyan 90+5' (pen.); Kirakosyan (yellow card) 90+5'	Stadium: City Stadium; Referee: Yura Mahtesyan

9 November 2025 13	Van	2–1	Gandzasar Kapan	Charentsavan
15:00 (UTC+4)	Granado 60'; Sidamonidze (yellow card) 61'; Jota 73' (yellow card) 73' (yellow-red card) 81'	Report	Avetisyan 43'; Duffour (yellow card) 62'	Stadium: City Stadium; Referee: Ashot Harutyunyan

23 November 2025 14	Van	3–2	BKMA Yerevan	Charentsavan
15:00 (UTC+4)	Eriki 3' (yellow card) 90+4'; Café 52'; Mkoyan 90+6' (pen.)	Report	Manukyan 28' (yellow card) 90'; G.Petrosyan 66'; Ayvazyan (yellow card) 67'; Avetisyan (yellow card) 90+4'	Stadium: City Stadium; Referee: Artem Gasparyan

2 December 2025 15	Van	0–0	Noah	Charentsavan
15:00 (UTC+4)	Granado (yellow card) 45+1'; Doh (yellow card) 75'	Report	Dashyan (yellow card) 25'; Silva (yellow card) 73'; Hambardzumyan (yellow card) 84'	Stadium: City Stadium; Referee: Hovhannes Kalantarian

7 March 2026 17	Van	1–2	Ararat Yerevan	Charentsavan
15:00 (UTC+4)	Mkoyan (yellow card) 45+1'; Maurinho 76'; Krasovski (yellow card) 90+6'	Report	Aslanyan (yellow card) 44'; Doumbia 85', 90+7' (pen.)	Stadium: City Stadium; Referee: Yura Mahtesyan

16 March 2026 18	Ararat-Armenia	3–0	Van	Abovyan
19:30 (UTC+4)	Banjaqui 15'; Ndour 27' (pen.); Serobyan 56'; Queirós (yellow card) 70'; Eloyan (yellow card) 90+3'	Report	Hovhannisyan (yellow card) 50'; Maurinho (yellow card) 69'	Stadium: Vahagn Tumasyan Stadium; Referee: Ashot Ghaltakhchyan

20 March 2026 19	Van	2–2	Ararat-Armenia	Charentsavan
15:30 (UTC+4)	Avetisyan 26' (pen.); Daniel (yellow card) 54'; Bokov (yellow card) 57'; Karapetyan 90+4'	Report	Daniel 62' (o.g.); Ndour 90+2' (pen.)	Stadium: City Stadium; Referee: Henrik Nalbandian

4 April 2026 20	Ararat Yerevan	1–2	Van	Yerevan
19:00 (UTC+4)	Doumbia 18'	Report	Avetisyan 45+2' (pen.); N.Manukyan 65'; Markovych (yellow card) 90+1'	Stadium: Republican Stadium; Referee: Hovhannes Kalantaryan

10 April 2026 21	Van	1–2	Urartu	Charentsavan
15:30 (UTC+4)	Reis (yellow card) 56'; Hovhannisyan 65'	Report	Ghazaryan (yellow card) 36'; Michel 46', 57' (pen.); Kaloukian (yellow card) 64'; Margaryan (yellow card) 80'; Melkonyan (yellow card) 90'	Stadium: City Stadium; Referee: Sargis Khachatryan

20 April 2026 22	Noah	2–0	Van	Abovyan
16:00 (UTC+4)	Silva 45'; Oshima (yellow card) 63' (goal) 67'	Report	Maurinho (yellow card) 75'	Stadium: Vahagn Tumasyan Stadium; Referee: Tiran Yeritsyan

23 April 2026 23	Van	1–2	BKMA Yerevan	Charentsavan
15:30 (UTC+4)	Reis (yellow card) 24'; Tatosyan 34'; Avetisyan (yellow card) 45+2'; Hovhannisyan (yellow card) 59'; Sidamonidze (yellow card) 73'	Report	G.Petrosyan 1' (yellow card) 86'; Mkoyan 90+3' (o.g.); Davtyan (yellow card) 90+6'	Stadium: City Stadium; Referee: Vardan Manukyan

26 April 2026 16	Urartu	2–0	Van	Yerevan
18:00 (UTC+4)	Kaloukian 11'; Ghazaryan (yellow card) 25'; Polyakov 29'	Report	Sidamonidze (yellow card) 18'; Maduka (yellow card) 32'	Stadium: Urartu Stadium; Referee: Hovhannes Kalantaryan
Note: Match originally scheduled for, and postponed on, 27 February due to adverse weather conditions.

2 May 2026 24	Gandzasar Kapan	0–1	Van	Yerevan
19:00 (UTC+4)	Kanda (yellow card) 59'; Petrosyan (yellow card) 63'; Ntolo (yellow card) 90'	Report	Hovhannisyan 37'; Karapetyan (yellow card) 42'; Silva (yellow card) 50'; Avetisyan (yellow card) 57'; N.Manukyan (yellow card) 59'; Désiré (yellow card) 81'; Bokov (yellow card) 90'	Stadium: Junior Stadium; Referee: Vardan Vardumyan

8 May 2026 25	Van	1–0	Shirak	Charentsavan
15:00 (UTC+4)	Sidamonidze (yellow card) 44'; Maduka 71'	Report	Mkrtchyan (yellow card) 30'	Stadium: City Stadium; Referee: Hovhannes Kalantaryan

16 May 2026 26	Van	0–1	Alashkert	Charentsavan
16:00 (UTC+4)	Maurinho (yellow card) 36'; Torres (yellow card) 56'	Report	Matyukhin (yellow card) 39'; Nalbandyan 57' (pen.); Beglaryan (yellow card) 90+1'	Stadium: City Stadium; Referee: Henrik Nalbandian

27 May 2026 27	Pyunik	2–1	Van	Yerevan
19:00 (UTC+4)	Moreno 22' (pen.); Afyan (yellow card) 79'; Almeida 84'	Report	Avetisyan 3'; Sidamonidze (yellow card) 21'	Stadium: Academy Stadium; Referee: Sargis Khachatryan

==== League table ====
Pos	Team	Pld	W	D	L	GF	GA	GD	Pts	Qualification or relegation
1	Ararat-Armenia (C)	27	18	6	3	50	25	+25	60	Qualification for the Champions League first qualifying round
2	Noah	27	16	8	3	61	19	+42	56	Qualification for the Conference League second qualifying round (Note: The 2025–26 Armenian Cup winners (Noah) qualify for the Conference League second qualifying round.)
3	Pyunik	27	17	4	6	37	18	+19	55	Qualification for the Conference League first qualifying round
4	Alashkert	27	16	5	6	42	23	+19	53	Qualification for the Conference League first qualifying round
5	Urartu	27	14	7	6	43	26	+17	49	
6	Van	27	9	4	14	27	40	−13	31	
7	BKMA	27	4	11	12	30	42	−12	23	
8	Gandzasar Kapan	27	5	6	16	20	41	−21	21	
9	Ararat Yerevan	27	3	4	20	21	63	−42	13 (Note: Matches won: Ararat 3, Shirak 2)	
10	Shirak	27	2	7	18	17	51	−34	13	

Source: FFA
Rules for classification: 1) Points; 2) Head-to-head points; 3) Head-to-head goal difference; 4) Head-to-head goals scored; 5) Matches won; 6) Goal difference; 7) Less red cards; 8) Less yellow cards; 9) Fair-play ranking 10) Draw
(C) Champions

=== Armenian Cup ===
28 October 2025 Round of 16	Urartu	4–0	Van	Yerevan
19:00 (UTC+4)	Mkrtchyan (yellow card) 11'; Vardanyan 45+1'; Polyakov 52'; Agasaryan (yellow card) 54'; Santos (yellow card) 72'; Melkonyan 81', 88'	Report	Mkoyan (yellow card) 43'	Stadium: Urartu Stadium; Referee: Henrik Nalbandian

== Squad statistics ==
As of match played 28 May 2025

=== Appearances and goals ===
No.	Pos	Nat	Player	Total		Premier League		Armenian Cup	
No.	Pos	Nat	Player	Apps	Goals	Apps	Goals	Apps	Goals
1	GK	(Armenia) ARM	Gor Manukyan	9	0	8	0	1	0
2	DF	(Colombia) COL	Javier Torres	9	0	8+1	0	0	0
3	DF	(Brazil) BRA	Ferreira	15	1	12+2	1	1	0
4	DF	(Georgia (country)) GEO	Saba Sidamonidze	24	1	22+1	1	0+1	0
5	DF	(Armenia) ARM	Hrayr Mkoyan	26	2	21+4	2	1	0
7	MF	(Armenia) ARM	Petros Avetisyan	11	3	7+4	3	0	0
8	MF	(Armenia) ARM	Hayk Tatosyan	10	1	10	1	0	0
9	FW	(Haiti) HAI	Jonel Désiré	6	0	0+6	0	0	0
10	MF	(Armenia) ARM	Benik Hovhannisyan	21	2	18+3	2	0	0
11	FW	(Armenia) ARM	Aris Karapetyan	9	1	3+6	1	0	0
13	DF	(Brazil) BRA	Alexsandro Silva	8	0	8	0	0	0
17	DF	(Georgia (country)) GEO	Nikolozi Sajaia	1	0	0+1	0	0	0
18	FW	(Brazil) BRA	Samuel Reis	21	0	12+9	0	0	0
19	MF	(Nigeria) NGR	Emeka Maduka	9	1	5+4	1	0	0
20	FW	(Brazil) BRA	Maurinho	12	1	12	1	0	0
22	DF	(Russia) RUS	Artur Zagorodnikov	1	0	1	0	0	0
23	DF	(Nigeria) NGR	Ibrahim Daniel	10	0	6+4	0	0	0
24	MF	(Armenia) ARM	Arsen Galstyan	3	0	0+3	0	0	0
25	MF	(Nigeria) NGR	Emmanuel Nnamani	3	0	0+3	0	0	0
26	DF	(Ukraine) UKR	Andriy Markovych	11	0	11	0	0	0
29	MF	(Armenia) ARM	Tigran Sargsyan	2	0	0+2	0	0	0
30	DF	(Armenia) ARM	Vahe Muradyan	2	0	1+1	0	0	0
37	MF	(Armenia) ARM	Hayk Rechelyan	1	0	0+1	0	0	0
39	MF	(Armenia) ARM	Gabriel Yeghiazaryan	1	0	0+1	0	0	0
45	GK	(Russia) RUS	Danila Bokov	20	0	20	0	0	0
70	MF	(Armenia) ARM	Narek Manukyan	18	1	10+8	1	0	0
77	FW	(Georgia (country)) GEO	Davit Krasovski	9	0	2+7	0	0	0
87	DF	(Argentina) ARG	Juan Perrotta	1	0	0+1	0	0	0
Players away on loan:
22	MF	(Armenia) ARM	Aleks Galstyan	2	0	0+2	0	0	0
Players who left Van during the season:
2	DF	(Armenia) ARM	Artur Daniyelyan	6	1	4+1	1	1	0
6	DF	(Colombia) COL	Jefferson Granado	9	2	8	2	1	0
8	MF	(Armenia) ARM	Petros Afajanyan	8	2	6+2	2	0	0
7	FW	(Brazil) BRA	Jota	5	1	2+3	1	0	0
9	FW	(Brazil) BRA	Kevin Pereira	11	0	8+2	0	1	0
11	MF	(Brazil) BRA	Lucas Café	12	1	10+1	1	1	0
13	MF	(Russia) RUS	David Kirakosyan	12	1	10+1	1	1	0
14	MF	(Brazil) BRA	Eriki	15	4	13+1	4	1	0
17	FW	(Armenia) ARM	Hamlet Minasyan	3	0	2+1	0	0	0
19	FW	(Nigeria) NGR	Ibrahim Yusuf	9	0	4+4	0	0+1	0
20	FW	(Ivory Coast) CIV	Cedric Doh	9	0	2+6	0	0+1	0
23	MF	(Armenia) ARM	Albert Mnatsakanyan	4	0	1+2	0	1	0
25	DF	(Ukraine) UKR	Hlib Bukhal	11	0	9+1	0	1	0
28	FW	(Colombia) COL	Hollman McCormick	2	0	0+2	0	0	0
33	FW	(Brazil) BRA	Allef	5	1	0+4	1	0+1	0
69	MF	(Ukraine) UKR	Denys Dedechko	8	0	7+1	0	0	0
77	FW	(Brazil) BRA	Sousa	1	0	1	0	0	0
88	DF	(Brazil) BRA	James Santos	15	0	14	0	1	0

=== Goal scorers ===
Place	Position	Nation	Number	Name	Premier League	Armenian Cup	Total
1	MF	(Brazil)	14	Eriki	4	0	4
2	MF	(Armenia)	7	Petros Avetisyan	3	0	3
3	MF	(Armenia)	8	Petros Afajanyan	2	0	2
3	DF	(Colombia)	6	Jefferson Granado	2	0	2
3	DF	(Armenia)	5	Hrayr Mkoyan	2	0	2
3	MF	(Armenia)	10	Benik Hovhannisyan	2	0	2
7	FW	(Brazil)	33	Allef	1	0	1
7	DF	(Armenia)	2	Artur Daniyelyan	1	0	1
7	DF	(Georgia (country))	4	Saba Sidamonidze	1	0	1
7	MF	(Russia)	13	David Kirakosyan	1	0	1
7	DF	(Brazil)	3	Ferreira	1	0	1
7	FW	(Brazil)	7	Jota	1	0	1
7	MF	(Brazil)	11	Lucas Café	1	0	1
7	FW	(Brazil)	20	Maurinho	1	0	1
7	FW	(Armenia)	11	Aris Karapetyan	1	0	1
7	MF	(Armenia)	70	Narek Manukyan	1	0	1
7	MF	(Armenia)	8	Hayk Tatosyan	1	0	1
7	MF	(Nigeria)	19	Emeka Maduka	1	0	1
				TOTALS	27	0	27

=== Clean sheets ===
Place	Position	Nation	Number	Name	Premier League	Armenian Cup	Total
1	GK	(Russia)	45	Danila Bokov	4	0	4
2	GK	(Armenia)	1	Gor Manukyan	2	0	2
				TOTALS	6	0	6

=== Disciplinary record ===
Number	Nation	Position	Name	Premier League		Armenian Cup		Total	
Number	Nation	Position	Name	Yellow card	Red card	Yellow card	Red card	Yellow card	Red card
1	(Armenia)	GK	Gor Manukyan	1	0	0	0	1	0
2	(Colombia)	DF	Javier Torres	1	0	0	0	1	0
3	(Brazil)	DF	Ferreira	1	0	0	0	1	0
4	(Georgia (country))	DF	Saba Sidamonidze	6	0	0	0	6	0
5	(Armenia)	DF	Hrayr Mkoyan	3	0	1	0	4	0
7	(Armenia)	MF	Petros Avetisyan	2	0	0	0	2	0
9	(Haiti)	FW	Jonel Désiré	1	0	0	0	1	0
10	(Armenia)	MF	Benik Hovhannisyan	3	0	0	0	3	0
11	(Armenia)	FW	Aris Karapetyan	1	0	0	0	1	0
13	(Brazil)	MF	Alexsandro Silva	1	0	0	0	1	0
18	(Brazil)	FW	Samuel Reis	3	0	0	0	3	0
19	(Nigeria)	MF	Emeka Maduka	1	0	0	0	1	0
20	(Brazil)	FW	Maurinho	3	0	0	0	3	0
23	(Nigeria)	DF	Ibrahim Daniel	1	0	0	0	1	0
26	(Ukraine)	DF	Andriy Markovych	1	0	0	0	1	0
45	(Russia)	GK	Danila Bokov	4	0	0	0	4	0
70	(Armenia)	MF	Narek Manukyan	3	0	0	0	3	0
77	(Georgia (country))	FW	Davit Krasovski	1	0	0	0	1	0
Players away on loan:
Players who left Van during the season:
6	(Colombia)	DF	Jefferson Granado	2	0	0	0	2	0
7	(Brazil)	FW	Jota	2	1	0	0	2	1
8	(Armenia)	MF	Petros Afajanyan	2	0	0	0	2	0
11	(Brazil)	MF	Lucas Café	2	0	0	0	2	0
13	(Russia)	MF	David Kirakosyan	3	0	0	0	3	0
14	(Brazil)	MF	Eriki	3	0	0	0	3	0
17	(Armenia)	FW	Hamlet Minasyan	1	0	0	0	1	0
19	(Nigeria)	FW	Ibrahim Yusuf	2	0	0	0	2	0
20	(Ivory Coast)	FW	Cedric Doh	1	0	0	0	1	0
23	(Armenia)	MF	Albert Mnatsakanyan	1	0	0	0	1	0
25	(Ukraine)	DF	Hlib Bukhal	1	0	0	0	1	0
69	(Ukraine)	MF	Denys Dedechko	1	0	0	0	1	0
88	(Brazil)	DF	James Santos	2	0	0	0	2	0
			TOTALS	60	1	1	0	61	1
