= List of Armenian football transfers winter 2025–26 =

This is a list of Armenian football transfers in the winter transfer window, by club. Only clubs of the 2025–26 Armenian Premier League are included.

== Armenian Premier League 2025-26 ==
=== Alashkert ===
In: Note: Flags indicate national team as defined under FIFA eligibility rules; some limited exceptions apply. Players may hold more than one non-FIFA nationality.

No.	Pos.	Nation	Player
1	GK	ARM	Vlad Chatunts (from (Armenia) Lernayin Artsakh)
9	FW	NGA	Ahmad Khalil Sammani (from (Nigeria) Mailantarki Care)
17	MF	ZAM	Joseph Sabobo (from (Israel) Hapoel Be'er Sheva)
21	DF	COL	Jefferson Granado (from (Armenia) Van)
28	FW	NGA	Usman Ajibona (loan return from (Armenia) Gandzasar Kapan)
73	MF	RUS	David Kirakosyan (from (Russia) Sochi)
88	MF	BRA	Rafael Jesus (from (Brazil) Sport Recife)

Out: Note: Flags indicate national team as defined under FIFA eligibility rules; some limited exceptions apply. Players may hold more than one non-FIFA nationality.

No.	Pos.	Nation	Player
20	FW	NGA	Obi Chima (on loan to (Armenia) Andranik)
30	MF	NGA	Dennis Mse (loan return to (Ghana) International Allies)
45	FW	NGA	Malik Odeyinka (to (Albania) Elbasani)
99	GK	SLE	Ibrahim Sesay (on loan to (Armenia) Andranik)

=== Ararat-Armenia ===
In: Note: Flags indicate national team as defined under FIFA eligibility rules; some limited exceptions apply. Players may hold more than one non-FIFA nationality.

No.	Pos.	Nation	Player
11	MF	GNB	Zidane Banjaqui (from (Greece) Panserraikos)
25	FW	SEN	Alioune Ndour (from (Belgium) Zulte Waregem)
33	DF	MAR	Bouchaib Arrassi (on loan from (Morocco) Raja CA)

Out: Note: Flags indicate national team as defined under FIFA eligibility rules; some limited exceptions apply. Players may hold more than one non-FIFA nationality.

No.	Pos.	Nation	Player
11	FW	COL	Jonathan Duarte
17	FW	NGA	Matthew Gbomadu (to (Portugal) Estrela da Amadora)
22	FW	ARM	Misak Hakobyan (on loan to (Armenia) Noah)
99	MF	BRA	João Lima (on loan to (Portugal) Feirense)

=== Ararat Yerevan ===
In: Note: Flags indicate national team as defined under FIFA eligibility rules; some limited exceptions apply. Players may hold more than one non-FIFA nationality.

No.	Pos.	Nation	Player
6	MF	NGA	Okechukwu Precious Chukwu (from (Nigeria) Golden Boot)
14	FW	NGA	Prince Emmanuel Obinna (from (Nigeria) Golden Boot)
19	DF	MLI	Souleymane Touré (from (Mali) Motema Pembe)
21	MF	NGA	Ayomide Enialafia (from (Nigeria) Golden Boot)
32	DF	NGA	Divine Ukadike (from (Nigeria) Golden Boot)
90	DF	NGA	Handsome Alexander (from (Nigeria) Golden Boot)

Out: Note: Flags indicate national team as defined under FIFA eligibility rules; some limited exceptions apply. Players may hold more than one non-FIFA nationality.

No.	Pos.	Nation	Player
6	MF	SEN	Alassane Faye
13	GK	ARM	Poghos Ayvazyan
14	MF	BEL	Zakaria Makhnoun
19	FW	NGA	James Johna
21	MF	ARM	Tigran Sargsyan
54	DF	BRA	Marcelo
64	MF	GUI	Alseny Touré (to (Tunisia) ES Zarzis)
—	FW	SEN	Moussa Kante (to (Luxembourg) Racing-Union)

=== BKMA Yerevan ===
In: Note: Flags indicate national team as defined under FIFA eligibility rules; some limited exceptions apply. Players may hold more than one non-FIFA nationality.

No.	Pos.	Nation	Player
—	DF	ARM	Arman Isayan (on loan from (Armenia) Urartu)
—	MF	ARM	Sedrak Movsisyan (on loan from (Armenia) Pyunik)
—	MF	ARM	Artak Galstyan (on loan from (Armenia) Pyunik)
—	MF	ARM	Davit Harutyunyan (on loan from (Armenia) Urartu)

Out: Note: Flags indicate national team as defined under FIFA eligibility rules; some limited exceptions apply. Players may hold more than one non-FIFA nationality.

No.	Pos.	Nation	Player
8	FW	ARM	Narek Janoyan (loan return to (Armenia) Shirak)
11	FW	ARM	Vyacheslav Afyan (loan return to (Armenia) Pyunik)
18	MF	ARM	Levon Bashoyan (loan return to (Armenia) Urartu)
19	MF	ARM	Suren Tsarukyan (loan return to (Armenia) Shirak)
26	MF	ARM	Garnik Minasyan (loan return to (Armenia) Urartu)

=== Gandzasar Kapan ===
In: Note: Flags indicate national team as defined under FIFA eligibility rules; some limited exceptions apply. Players may hold more than one non-FIFA nationality.

No.	Pos.	Nation	Player
6	MF	BEN	Mariano Ahouangbo (on loan from (Slovenia) Olimpija Ljubljana)
12	GK	ARM	Rafael Manasyan (from (Lithuania) Nevėžis)
17	MF	ARM	Davit Davtyan (on loan from (Armenia) Noah)
19	MF	NGA	Haggai Katoh
21	FW	COL	Ethan Lizalda (from (Kyrgyzstan) Uzgen)
23	MF	LUX	Lucca (from (Slovakia) Slovan Duslo Šaľa)
70	DF	UKR	Danylo Malov (on loan from (Slovenia) Olimpija Ljubljana)
79	MF	POR	João Nóbrega (from (China) Qingdao Red Lions)
88	FW	IRN	Arwin Kalmarzy

Out: Note: Flags indicate national team as defined under FIFA eligibility rules; some limited exceptions apply. Players may hold more than one non-FIFA nationality.

No.	Pos.	Nation	Player
6	DF	ARM	Vaspurak Minasyan (to (Armenia) Hayk)
22	DF	BLR	Yevgeniy Guletskiy
28	FW	NGA	Usman Ajibona (loan return to (Armenia) Alashkert)
29	FW	CIV	Yevgeniy Guletskiy
37	DF	ARM	Ruben Karagulyan (to (Armenia) Shirak)
96	MF	ARM	Petros Avetisyan (to (Armenia) Van)

=== Noah ===
In: Note: Flags indicate national team as defined under FIFA eligibility rules; some limited exceptions apply. Players may hold more than one non-FIFA nationality.

No.	Pos.	Nation	Player
4	DF	BEL	Rob Nizet (from (Turkey) Gaziantep)
20	MF	ROU	Valentin Costache (from (Romania) UTA Arad)
22	FW	ARM	Misak Hakobyan (on loan from Ararat-Armenia)

Out: Note: Flags indicate national team as defined under FIFA eligibility rules; some limited exceptions apply. Players may hold more than one non-FIFA nationality.

No.	Pos.	Nation	Player
4	DF	ISL	Guðmundur Þórarinsson (to (Iceland) ÍA)
10	MF	ARM	Artak Dashyan (to (Armenia) Pyunik)
22	GK	ARM	Ognjen Čančarević (to (Serbia) IMT)

=== Pyunik ===
In: Note: Flags indicate national team as defined under FIFA eligibility rules; some limited exceptions apply. Players may hold more than one non-FIFA nationality.

No.	Pos.	Nation	Player
5	DF	BRA	James Santos (from (Armenia) Van)
17	FW	ARM	Vyacheslav Afyan (loan return from (Armenia) BKMA Yerevan)
88	DF	ARM	Robert Darbinyan (from (Armenia) Shirak)
90	FW	GUI	Momo Yansané (from (Cyprus) Omonia Aradippou)
—	DF	POR	Gonçalo Miguel (on loan from (Russia) Ural Yekaterinburg)
—	MF	ARM	Artak Dashyan (from (Armenia) Noah)

Out: Note: Flags indicate national team as defined under FIFA eligibility rules; some limited exceptions apply. Players may hold more than one non-FIFA nationality.

No.	Pos.	Nation	Player
11	DF	COD	Joël Bopesu (to (Lithuania) Panevėžys)
21	MF	ARM	Serob Galstyan (to (Armenia) Sardarapat)
23	MF	BRA	Vagner Gonçalves (to (Albania) Teuta)
30	GK	RUS	Daniil Polyansky (to (Kyrgyzstan) Asiagoal Bishkek)
44	MF	ARM	Hayk Tatosyan (on loan to (Armenia) Van)
77	FW	NGA	Sani Buhari
89	FW	ARM	Aris Karapetyan (on loan to (Armenia) Van)
—	DF	ARM	Norayr Nikoghosyan
—	MF	ARM	Sedrak Movsisyan (on loan to (Armenia) BKMA Yerevan)
—	MF	ARM	Artak Galstyan (on loan to (Armenia) BKMA Yerevan)

=== Shirak ===
In: Note: Flags indicate national team as defined under FIFA eligibility rules; some limited exceptions apply. Players may hold more than one non-FIFA nationality.

No.	Pos.	Nation	Player
—	DF	ARM	Ruben Karagulyan (from (Armenia) Gandzasar Kapan)
—	MF	ARM	Suren Tsarukyan (loan return from (Armenia) BKMA Yerevan)
—	FW	ARM	Narek Janoyan (loan return from (Armenia) BKMA Yerevan)

Out: Note: Flags indicate national team as defined under FIFA eligibility rules; some limited exceptions apply. Players may hold more than one non-FIFA nationality.

No.	Pos.	Nation	Player
7	DF	ARM	Seryozha Urushanyan
10	FW	ARM	Razmik Hakobyan
99	DF	ARM	Robert Darbinyan (to (Armenia) Pyunik)

=== Urartu ===
In: Note: Flags indicate national team as defined under FIFA eligibility rules; some limited exceptions apply. Players may hold more than one non-FIFA nationality.

No.	Pos.	Nation	Player
24	MF	ARM	Levon Bashoyan (loan return from (Armenia) BKMA Yerevan)
27	FW	POR	Miguel Velosa (from (Portugal) Caldas)
—	MF	ARM	Garnik Minasyan (loan return from (Armenia) BKMA Yerevan)

Out: Note: Flags indicate national team as defined under FIFA eligibility rules; some limited exceptions apply. Players may hold more than one non-FIFA nationality.

No.	Pos.	Nation	Player
53	MF	ARM	Davit Harutyunyan (on loan to (Armenia) BKMA Yerevan)
—	DF	ARM	Arman Isayan (on loan to (Armenia) BKMA Yerevan)

=== Van ===
In: Note: Flags indicate national team as defined under FIFA eligibility rules; some limited exceptions apply. Players may hold more than one non-FIFA nationality.

No.	Pos.	Nation	Player
2	DF	COL	Javier Torres (from (Colombia) Itagüí Leones)
7	MF	ARM	Petros Avetisyan (from (Armenia) Gandzasar Kapan)
8	MF	ARM	Hayk Tatosyan (on loan from (Armenia) Pyunik)
9	FW	HAI	Jonel Désiré (from (Armenia) Andranik)
11	FW	ARM	Aris Karapetyan (on loan from (Armenia) Pyunik)
13	MF	BRA	Alexsandro Silva (from (Brazil) Centro Olímpico)
14	DF	NGA	Henry Onwukwe (from (Nigeria) Right2Win)
17	DF	GEO	Nikolozi Sajaia (from (Georgia (country)) Kolkheti-1913 Poti)
19	MF	NGA	Emeka Maduka (from (Nigeria) Right2Win SA)
20	MF	BRA	Maurinho (from (Brazil) Ibrachina)
22	DF	RUS	Artur Zagorodnikov (from (Russia) Krylia Sovetov-2 Samara)
23	DF	NGA	Ibrahim Daniel
25	MF	NGA	Emmanuel Nnamani (from (Nigeria) Right2Win SA)
26	DF	UKR	Andriy Markovych
77	FW	GEO	Davit Krasovski (from (Georgia (country)) Kolkheti-1913 Poti)
87	DF	ARG	Juan Perrotta (from (Argentina) El Porvenir)

Out: Note: Flags indicate national team as defined under FIFA eligibility rules; some limited exceptions apply. Players may hold more than one non-FIFA nationality.

No.	Pos.	Nation	Player
2	DF	ARM	Artur Danielyan
6	DF	COL	Jefferson Granado (to (Armenia) Alashkert)
7	FW	BRA	Jota (loan return to (Brazil) EC Água Santa)
8	MF	ARM	Petros Afajanyan (to (Armenia) Syunik)
9	FW	BRA	Kevin Pereira
11	MF	BRA	Lucas Café (to (Georgia (country)) Iberia 1999)
13	MF	RUS	David Kirakosyan (loan return to (Russia) Sochi)
14	DF	BRA	Eriki (to (Ukraine) Karpaty Lviv)
19	FW	NGA	Ibrahim Yusuf (to (Nigeria) Rangers International)
20	FW	CIV	Cedric Doh
21	MF	COL	William Ovalle
23	MF	ARM	Albert Mnatsakanyan (to (Albania) Luftëtari)
24	DF	ARM	Arsen Galstyan (on loan to (Armenia) BKMA Yerevan)
25	DF	UKR	Hlib Bukhal (to (Kazakhstan) Ulytau)
28	FW	COL	Hollman McCormick
29	MF	ARM	Harutyun Asatryan (to (Armenia) Ararat Yerevan)
33	FW	BRA	Allef
69	MF	UKR	Denys Dedechko
77	FW	BRA	Sousa
88	DF	BRA	James Santos (to (Armenia) Pyunik)
99	DF	BRA	Paulo Vitor
