= 2024–25 FC Van season =

Van
2024-25 season
- Chairman: Sergei Ghukasov
- Manager: Vahe Gevorgyan
- Stadium: City Stadium
- Premier League: 5th
- Armenian Cup: Semi-final
- Top goalscorer: League: Momo Touré (12); All: Momo Touré (15)
Home colours	Away colours

The 2024–25 season was FC Van's 5th season in Armenian Premier League.

== Season overview ==
On 2 July, Vahe Gevorgyan was announced as the new Head Coach of Van.

== Squad ==
As of match played 28 May 2025

Number	Name	Nationality	Position	Date of birth (age)	Signed from	Signed in	Contract ends	Apps.	Goals
Goalkeepers
13	Narek Voskanyan	(Armenia)	GK	29 January 2000 (aged 25)	Gandzasar Kapan	2024	2025	0	0
24	Arsen Beglaryan	(Armenia)	GK	18 February 1993 (aged 32)	Ararat-Armenia	2025		13	0
31	Anatoly Ayvazov	(Armenia)	GK	8 June 1996 (aged 28)	West Armenia	2025		5	0
96	Amir Idrisov	(Russia)	GK	25 December 2005 (aged 19)	Vista Gelendzhik	2024	2026	0	0
Defenders
2	Serob Grigoryan	(Armenia)	DF	4 February 1995 (aged 30)	Alashkert	2024	2025	26	0
3	Emmanuel John	(Nigeria)	DF	1 August 2005 (aged 19)	on loan from Botev Plovdiv	2024	2025	31	1
4	Norayr Nikoghosyan	(Armenia)	DF	9 March 2002 (aged 23)	Noah	2024	2025	3	0
5	Davit Terteryan	(Armenia)	DF	9 March 2002 (aged 23)	Ararat-Armenia	2024	2025	31	2
6	Yaroslav Matyukhin	(Russia)	DF	19 September 2005 (aged 19)	Vista Gelendzhik	2024	2026	24	0
15	Arsen Sadoyan	(Armenia)	DF	16 March 1999 (aged 26)	Shirak	2024	2025	30	0
22	Robert Hakobyan	(Armenia)	DF	22 October 1996 (aged 28)	West Armenia	2024	2025	28	1
23	Clever Ime Sampson	(Nigeria)	DF	30 March 2006 (aged 19)	Dakkada	2024	2026	0	0
27	Julien Eymard Bationo	(Ivory Coast)	DF	12 October 2005 (aged 19)	Vista Gelendzhik	2025		17	2
33	Armen Sargsyan	(Armenia)	DF	20 February 2004 (aged 21)	West Armenia	2025		2	0
44	Klaidher Macedo	(Brazil)	DF	18 January 1999 (aged 26)	Krumovgrad	2024	2025	34	1
Midfielders
7	Karen Nalbandyan	(Armenia)	MF	14 April 2002 (aged 23)	Alashkert	2024	2025	33	9
8	Yuri Gareginyan	(Armenia)	MF	3 February 1994 (aged 31)	Alashkert	2024	2025	27	0
14	Izuchukwu Okonkwo	(Nigeria)	MF	5 April 2006 (aged 19)	on loan from Botev Plovdiv	2024	2025	32	8
19	Aliun Junior Dosso	(Ivory Coast)	MF	19 April 2005 (aged 20)	Stars Olympic	2024	2025	4	0
Forwards
9	Jesse Akila	(Nigeria)	FW	27 December 2001 (aged 23)	AS Trenčín	2024	2025	25	5
10	Olawale Farayola	(Nigeria)	FW	10 October 2002 (aged 22)	Unattached	2024	2025	31	3
11	Momo Touré	(Guinea)	FW	1 May 2006 (aged 19)	Unattached	2024		46	21
17	Levon Vardanyan	(Armenia)	FW	2 November 2003 (aged 21)	Pyunik	2024	2026	19	3
28	Usman Ajibona Akorede	(Nigeria)	FW	23 February 2007 (aged 18)	Vista Gelendzhik	2025		14	2
45	Malik Odeyinka	(Nigeria)	FW	1 May 2006 (aged 19)	on loan from Botev Plovdiv	2025	2025	14	2
77	Kajally Drammeh	(The Gambia)	FW	10 October 2003 (aged 21)	Cape Town City	2024	2026	29	5
Away on loan
	Suleiman Idris	(Nigeria)	MF	19 October 2005 (aged 19)	GBS Academy	2024		0	0
	Ibrahim Yusuf	(Nigeria)	FW	24 October 2003 (aged 21)	Sunshine Stars	2024		0	0
Left during the season
10	John Batigi	(Ghana)	FW	24 June 2006 (aged 18)	on loan from Botev Plovdiv	2024	2025	19	7
27	Citta Bah	(Sierra Leone)	DF	27 April 2006 (aged 19)	Vista Gelendzhik	2024	2025	1	0
31	Daniil Polyanski	(Russia)	GK	18 February 2001 (aged 24)	Sibir Novosibirsk	2024	2025	19	0
99	Mamadou Diallo	(Guinea)	FW	31 October 1997 (aged 27)	Unattached	2024	2025	14	2

== Transfers ==
=== In ===
Date	Position	Nationality	Name	From	Fee	Ref.
2 July 2024	DF	(Armenia)	Davit Terteryan	Ararat-Armenia	Undisclosed	
2 July 2024	MF	(Armenia)	Yuri Gareginyan	Alashkert	Undisclosed	
3 July 2024	DF	(Armenia)	Robert Hakobyan	West Armenia	Undisclosed	
3 July 2024	DF	(Armenia)	Arsen Sadoyan	Shirak	Undisclosed	
4 July 2024	DF	(Armenia)	Norayr Nikoghosyan	Noah	Undisclosed	
5 July 2024	DF	(Armenia)	Serob Grigoryan	Alashkert	Undisclosed	
6 July 2024	MF	(Armenia)	Karen Nalbandyan	Alashkert	Undisclosed	
12 July 2024	GK	(Armenia)	Narek Voskanyan	Gandzasar Kapan	Undisclosed	
16 July 2024	FW	(Nigeria)	Jesse Akila	AS Trenčín	Undisclosed	
28 July 2024	DF	(Russia)	Yaroslav Matyukhin	Vista Gelendzhik	Undisclosed	
30 July 2024	GK	(Russia)	Daniil Polyanski	Sibir Novosibirsk	Undisclosed	
1 August 2024	FW	(Nigeria)	Olawale Farayola	Unattached	Free	
3 August 2024	DF	(Nigeria)	Clever Ime Sampson	Dakkada	Undisclosed	
3 August 2024	FW	(Guinea)	Mamadou Diallo	Unattached	Free	
3 August 2024	FW	(Nigeria)	Levon Vardanyan	Pyunik	Undisclosed	
4 August 2024	DF	(Brazil)	Klaidher Macedo	Krumovgrad	Undisclosed	
8 August 2024	MF	(Ivory Coast)	Aliun Junior Dosso	Stars Olympic	Undisclosed	
9 August 2024	DF	(Sierra Leone)	Citta Bah	Vista Gelendzhik	Undisclosed	
19 August 2024	FW	(The Gambia)	Kajally Drammeh	Cape Town City	Undisclosed	
19 August 2024	FW	(Nigeria)	Ibrahim Yusuf	Sunshine Stars	Undisclosed	
12 September 2024	GK	(Russia)	Amir Idrisov	Vista Gelendzhik	Undisclosed	
12 September 2024	MF	(Nigeria)	Suleiman Idris	GBS Academy	Undisclosed	
13 January 2025	GK	(Armenia)	Arsen Beglaryan	Ararat-Armenia	Free	
6 February 2025	GK	(Armenia)	Anatoly Ayvazov	West Armenia	Undisclosed	
21 February 2025	DF	(Ivory Coast)	Julien Eymard Bationo	Vista Gelendzhik	Undisclosed	
23 February 2025	DF	(Armenia)	Armen Sargsyan	West Armenia	Undisclosed	
23 February 2025	FW	(Nigeria)	Usman Ajibona Akorede	Vista Gelendzhik	Undisclosed	

=== Loans in ===
Date from	Position	Nationality	Name	From	Date to	Ref.
23 July 2024	MF	(Nigeria)	Izuchukwu Okonkwo	Botev Plovdiv	End of season	
23 July 2024	FW	(Ghana)	John Batigi	Botev Plovdiv	31 December 2024	
3 August 2024	DF	(Nigeria)	Emmanuel John	Botev Plovdiv	End of season	
16 January 2025	FW	(Nigeria)	Malik Odeyinka	Botev Plovdiv	End of season	

=== Out ===
Date	Position	Nationality	Name	To	Fee	Ref.
23 July 2024	DF	(Armenia)	Edgar Piloyan	Botev Plovdiv	Undisclosed	
21 February 2025	FW	(Guinea)	Mamadou Diallo	Syunik	Undisclosed	

=== Loans out ===
Date from	Position	Nationality	Name	To	Date to	Ref.
20 August 2024	FW	(Nigeria)	Ibrahim Yusuf	West Armenia	End of season	
12 September 2024	MF	(Nigeria)	Suleiman Idris	West Armenia	End of season	

=== Released ===
Date	Position	Nationality	Name	Joined	Date	Ref.
3 July 2024	DF	(Armenia)	Arman Mkrtchyan	Syunik		
3 July 2024	DF	(Armenia)	Hovhannes Nazaryan			
3 July 2024	DF	(Armenia)	Arsen Yeghiazaryan	West Armenia		
3 July 2024	MF	(Armenia)	Narek Hovhannisyan	Alashkert	1 August 2024	
3 July 2024	FW	(Nigeria)	Olaoluwa Ojetunde	Telavi	16 July 2024	
8 July 2024	GK	(Armenia)	Vardan Shahatuni	Cilicia		
8 July 2024	MF	(Portugal)	Serginho	Sliema Wanderers		
12 January 2025	GK	(Russia)	Daniil Polyanski	Arsenal Dzerzhinsk		
26 February 2025	DF	(Sierra Leone)	Citta Bah	Star Sport		

== Friendlies ==
	–
(UTC+4)

== Competitions ==
=== Overview ===
Competition	First match	Last match	Starting round	Final position	Record							
Competition	First match	Last match	Starting round	Final position	Pld	W	D	L	GF	GA	GD	Win %
Premier League	4 August 2024	28 May 2025	Matchday 1	5th	30	15	7	8	56	36	+20	50.00
Armenian Cup	21 August 2024	30 April 2025	First Round	Semi-Final	6	5	0	1	13	4	+9	83.33
Total					36	20	7	9	69	40	+29	55.56

Last updated: 28 May 2025
Source: Competitions

=== Premier League ===
==== Results summary ====
Overall								Home						Away					
Pld	W	D	L	GF	GA	GD	Pts	W	D	L	GF	GA	GD	W	D	L	GF	GA	GD
30	15	7	8	56	36	+20	52	8	3	4	36	19	+17	7	4	4	20	17	+3

Last updated: 28 May 2025.
Source: See Results

==== Results by round ====
Round	1	2	3	4	5	6	7	8	9	10	11	12	13	14	15	16	17	18	19	21	22	23	24	25	26	27	28	29	30	20	31	32	33
Ground	H	A	H	A	H	A	H	A	-	H	A	A	A	-	H	H	H	A	H	H	A	H	A	H	A	H	A	H	A	A	-	H	A
Result	L	D	W	W	W	W	D	W	P	L	L	L	L	P	W	W	L	W	W	D	D	W	D	W	W	L	D	D	L	W	P	W	W
Position	9	9	4	3	2	1	3	1	2	5	5	5	5	5	5	5	5	5	5	5	5	5	5	5	5	5	5	5	5	5	5	5	5

Updated to match(es) played on 28 May 2025. Source: See Results
A = Away; H = Home; W = Win; D = Draw; L = Loss; P = Bye

==== Results ====
4 August 2024 1	Van	0–2	Ararat-Armenia	Charentsavan
17:00 (UTC+4)	Okonkwo (yellow card) 82'; Akila (yellow card) 90+5'	Report	Duarte 32'; Pavlovets (yellow card) 34'; Rodríguez 68' (pen.)	Stadium: City Stadium; Referee: Henrik Nalbandian

9 August 2024 2	Alashkert	1–1	Van	Abovyan
17:00 (UTC+4)	Kartashyan (yellow card) 33'; Embaló 69' (pen.); Khachatryan (yellow card) 82'	Report	Akila 8'	Stadium: City Stadium; Referee: Artak Vardanyan

16 August 2024 3	Van	6–1	Gandzasar Kapan	Charentsavan
17:00 (UTC+4)	Nalbandyan 4', 78' (pen.); Akila 17'; Batigi 25', 40'; Diallo 53'	Report	Opoku (yellow card) 10'; Muradyan 30'; Mustafaev (yellow card) 59'	Stadium: City Stadium; Referee: Ashot Ghaltakhchyan

26 August 2024 4	Shirak	0–2	Van	Gyumri
17:00 (UTC+4)		Report	Diallo (yellow card) 27'; Terteryan (yellow card) 45+1'; Touré 50' (yellow card) 58'; Hakobyan (yellow card) 76'; Polyanski (yellow card) 84'; Nikoghosyan (yellow card) 86'; Batigi 90+1'	Stadium: City Stadium; Referee: Yura Mahtesyan

31 August 2024 5	Van	6–0	West Armenia	Charentsavan
17:00 (UTC+4)	Batigi 14', 43', 56' (yellow card) 69'; Rudoselsky 17' (o.g.); Okonkwo (yellow card) 21'; Nalbandyan 45'; Matyukhin (yellow card) 54'; Touré 69' (pen.)	Report	Kartashyan (yellow card) 55'; Candé (yellow card) 64'; Sargsyan (red card) 66'	Stadium: City Stadium; Referee: Hovhannes Kalantaryan

13 September 2024 6	BKMA Yerevan	0–1	Van	Yerevan
17:00 (UTC+4)	Avetisyan (yellow card) 20'; Hovhannisyan (yellow card) 52'; Eloyan (yellow card) 67'	Report	Touré 31'; Drammeh (yellow card) 74'; Sadoyan (yellow card) 81'	Stadium: Yerevan Football Academy Stadium; Referee: Ashot Ghaltakhchyan

19 September 2024 7	Van	1–1	Noah	Charentsavan
16:00 (UTC+4)	Gareginyan (yellow card) 44'; Farayola 59'; Matyukhin (red card) 63'; Polyanski (yellow card) 89'; Akila (yellow card) 90+6'	Report	Oulad Omar 28'	Stadium: City Stadium; Referee: Zaven Hovhannisyan

23 September 2024 8	Ararat Yerevan	0–3	Van	Yerevan
17:00 (UTC+4)	Khachumyan (yellow card) 36'; Trémoulet (yellow card) 68'; Malakyan (yellow card) 79'	Report	Gareginyan (yellow card) 15'; Touré 21', 57'; Nalbandyan 45'; Klaidher (yellow card) 65'	Stadium: Republican Stadium; Referee: Hovhannes Kalantaryan

9	Bye
(UTC+4)

6 October 2024 10	Van	1–3	Pyunik	Charentsavan
14:30 (UTC+4)	Touré (yellow card) 42'; Drammeh 86'	Report	Agdon (yellow card) 31' (goal) 33'; Caraballo 45'; Kovalenko (yellow card) 47'; Otubanjo (yellow card) 50'; James 77'	Stadium: City Stadium; Referee: Ashot Ghaltakhchyan

16 October 2024 11	Urartu	3–1	Van	Yerevan
19:00 (UTC+4)	S.Mkrtchyan 15'; Putsko (yellow card) 25'; Ignatyev 59' (pen.); Piloyan (yellow card) 84'; Polyarus 87'	Report	Klaidher (yellow card) 9'; Touré (yellow card) 28' (yellow-red card) 34'; Okonkwo 42' (yellow card) 90+6'; Gareginyan (yellow card) 42'; Nalbandyan (yellow card) 80'	Stadium: Urartu Stadium; Referee: Vardan Manukyan

20 October 2024 12	Noah	5–0	Van	Abovyan
19:00 (UTC+4)	Gregório 9'; Oulad Omar 45+2'; Þórarinsson 74'; Aiás 77'; Çinari 90+3'	Report	Klaidher (yellow card) 30'; John (yellow card) 45'	Stadium: City Stadium; Referee: Zaven Hovhannisyan

28 October 2024 13	Pyunik	1–0	Van	Yerevan
17:00 (UTC+4)	James 13'; Malakyan (yellow card) 88'	Report	Okonkwo (yellow card) 36'; John (yellow card) 53'; Matyukhin (yellow card) 70'	Stadium: Junior Sports Stadium; Referee: Artem Gasparyan

14	Bye
(UTC+4)

5 November 2024 15	Van	4–0	Ararat Yerevan	Charentsavan
15:00 (UTC+4)	Touré 26' (yellow card) 45+1'; Nalbandyan 37'; Drammeh 47'; Vardanyan 88'	Report		Stadium: City Stadium; Referee: Vardan Manukyan

11 November 2024 16	Van	3–1	Urartu	Charentsavan
15:00 (UTC+4)	John (yellow card) 5'; Touré 17', 70'; Matyukhin (yellow card) 37'; Akila (yellow card) 78' (goal) 85'; Hakobyan (yellow card) 81'	Report	Kilin 12'; Gilmore (yellow card) 77'	Stadium: City Stadium; Referee: Zaven Hovhannisyan

22 November 2024 17	Van	2–3	BKMA Yerevan	Charentsavan
15:00 (UTC+4)	Gareginyan (yellow card) 25'; Touré 58'; Okonkwo 68'; Batigi (yellow card) 90+1'; Polyanski (yellow card) 90+5'	Report	Arakelyan 26' (yellow card) 37'; Eloyan 45+1', 90+5' (pen.); Avetisyan (yellow card) 47'; Hovhannisyan (yellow card) 67'; Petrosyan (yellow card) 90+3'	Stadium: City Stadium; Referee: Yura Mahtesyan

26 November 2024 18	West Armenia	0–2	Van	Yerevan
15:00 (UTC+4)	Junior (yellow card) 26'; Danielyan (yellow card) 89'; Makhsudyan (yellow card) 90+2'	Report	Farayola 45+7'; Terteryan (yellow card) 60'; Touré (yellow card) 67'; Akila 87'	Stadium: Junior Sport Stadium; Referee: Ashot Ghaltakhchyan

2 December 2024 19	Van	1–0	Shirak	Charentsavan
14:00 (UTC+4)	John (yellow card) 29'; Batigi 47'; Grigoryan (yellow card) 90+6'	Report	L.Darbinyan (yellow card) 18'; Vidić (yellow card) 45+4'; Kodia (yellow card) 58'; Mnatsakanyan (yellow card) 67'	Stadium: City Stadium; Referee: Vardan Manukyan

1 March 2025 21	Van	1–1	Alashkert	Charentsavan
15:00 (UTC+4)	Touré 8'; Bationo (yellow card) 67'; Nalbandyan (yellow card) 73'	Report	Manucharyan 63'; Vimercati (yellow card) 88'	Stadium: City Stadium; Referee: Vardan Manukyan

10 March 2025 22	Ararat-Armenia	1–1	Van	Yerevan
18:00 (UTC+4)	Tera 9'; Queirós (yellow card) 36' (yellow-red card) 86'; Noubissi (yellow card) 52'; Nondi (yellow card) 88'	Report	Drammeh (yellow card) 53'; John (yellow card) 57'; Hakobyan (yellow card) 88' (goal) 90+5'; Terteryan (yellow card) 90+5'	Stadium: Yerevan Football Academy Stadium; Referee: Ashot Ghaltakhchyan

16 March 2025 23	Van	2–0	West Armenia	Charentsavan
15:00 (UTC+4)	Terteryan 1' (yellow card) 57'; Bationo (yellow card) 10'; Okonkwo 45+6'; Klaidher (yellow card) 70'	Report	Israelyan (yellow card) 45+5'; Makhsudyan (yellow card) 68'; Kartashyan (yellow card) 75'; Racines (yellow card) 75'	Stadium: City Stadium; Referee: Yura Mahtesyan

29 March 2025 24	Alashkert	2–2	Van	Charentsavan
16:00 (UTC+4)	Khachatryan (yellow card) 45'; Metoyan 83'; Mensah 89'	Report	Touré (yellow card) 26'; Okonkwo 43' (yellow card) 81'; Bationo (yellow card) 56'; Odeyinka 80'	Stadium: City Stadium; Referee: Zaven Hovhannisyan

6 April 2025 25	Van	2–0	Gandzasar Kapan	Charentsavan
16:00 (UTC+4)	John (red card) 4'; Nalbandyan 39'; Terteryan (yellow card) 45' (goal) 90+4'	Report	Mani (yellow card) 27'; Opoku (yellow card) 37'; Obonde (yellow card) 55' (yellow-red card) 69'	Stadium: City Stadium; Referee: Zaven Hovhannisyan

12 April 2025 26	Shirak	0–1	Van	Gyumri
19:00 (UTC+4)	R.Darbinyan (yellow card) 17'; Misakyan (yellow card) 31'; Doh (yellow card) 81'	Report	Touré (yellow card) 13'; Dosso (yellow card) 52'; Gareginyan (yellow card) 52'; Drammeh (yellow card) 59'; Bationo 72'; Macedo (yellow card) 87'; Hakobyan (yellow card) 90+6'	Stadium: City Stadium; Referee: Ashot Harutyunyan

20 April 2025 27	Van	2–3	Ararat-Armenia	Charentsavan
16:00 (UTC+4)	Okonkwo 8'; Bationo 45+8'	Report	Duarte (yellow card) 12'; Noubissi 15'; Shaghoyan 45', 48'; Queirós (yellow card) 45+5'	Stadium: City Stadium; Referee: Ashot Ghaltakhchyan

26 April 2025 28	BKMA Yerevan	1–1	Van	Yerevan
16:00 (UTC+4)	D.Hakobyan 45+3'; Ha.Sargsyan (yellow card) 62'; Bashoyan (yellow card) 84'; Ayvazyan (yellow card) 90+6' (red card) 90+6'	Report	Akila 90+5'; Odeyinka (yellow card) 90+7'	Stadium: Yerevan Football Academy Stadium; Referee: Zaven Hovhannisyan

4 May 2025 29	Van	2–2	Noah	Charentsavan
16:00 (UTC+4)	Akorede (yellow card) 1'; Nalbandyan 24'; Touré 66'; Grigoryan (yellow card) 90+1'; Ayvazov (yellow card) 90+2'; Dosso (red card) 90+8'	Report	Miljković (yellow card) 40'; Çinari (yellow card) 45+1'; Zolotić (yellow card) 54'; Ferreira 55'; Čančarević (yellow card) 67'; Silva 90+3'; Manvelyan (yellow card) 90+7'; Gregório (red card) 90+8'	Stadium: City Stadium; Referee: Henrik Nalbandian

8 May 2025 30	Ararat Yerevan	2–1	Van	Yerevan
16:00 (UTC+4)	Doumbia 7'; Kante 90+1' (yellow card) 90+7'	Report	Drammeh 16'; Okonkwo (yellow card) 55'; Nalbandyan (yellow card) 74'	Stadium: Republican Stadium; Referee: Artem Gasparyan

12 May 2025 20	Gandzasar Kapan	1–2	Van	Yerevan
16:00 (UTC+4)	Obonde (yellow card) 33'; Faye 35'; Opoku (yellow card) 67'; Ge.Matevosyan (yellow card) 90+1'	Report	Akorede 17'; Drammeh 40'; Touré (yellow card) 70'	Stadium: Junior Sport Stadium
Note: Match originally scheduled for 24 February 2025.

31	Bye
(UTC+4)

23 May 2025 32	Van	3–2	Pyunik	Charentsavan
16:00 (UTC+4)	Touré 33'; Akorede 35' (yellow card) 56'; Macedo 51'	Report	Voskanyan 45'; Haroyan (yellow card) 48'; Kovalenko (yellow card) 75' (goal) 90+8'	Stadium: City Stadium; Referee: Henrik Nalbandian

28 May 2025 33	Urartu	0–2	Van	Yerevan
16:00 (UTC+4)	Santos (yellow card) 46'	Report	Okonkwo 4'; Touré (yellow card) 29'; Drammeh 55'	Stadium: Urartu Stadium; Referee: Ashot Harutyunyan

==== League table ====
Pos	Team	Pld	W	D	L	GF	GA	GD	Pts	Qualification or relegation
1	Noah (C)	30	24	3	3	92	20	+72	75	Qualification for the Champions League first qualifying round
2	Ararat-Armenia	30	21	3	6	75	28	+47	66	Qualification for the Conference League second qualifying round (Note: The 2024–25 Armenian Cup winners qualified for the Conference League second qualifying round. Since the cup winners (Noah) qualified based on league position, the Conference League second round spot was passed to the second-placed team, and the second Conference League first round spot was passed to the fourth-placed team.)
3	Urartu	30	19	5	6	64	31	+33	62	Qualification for the Conference League first qualifying round
4	Pyunik	30	17	2	11	59	37	+22	53	Qualification for the Conference League first qualifying round
5	Van	30	15	7	8	56	36	+20	52	
6	BKMA	30	10	6	14	44	54	−10	36	
7	Shirak	30	10	5	15	30	50	−20	35	
8	Ararat Yerevan	30	9	5	16	36	59	−23	32	
9	Alashkert	30	6	8	16	24	52	−28	26	
10	West Armenia (Note: On 7 May 2025, it was announced that West Armenia were on the verge of expulsion after a no show against Ararat-Armenia. On 17 May 2025, they were officially expelled and all games were awarded 3–0 to their opponents.) (D, R)	30	7	2	21	22	78	−56	23	Relegation to the Armenian First League
11	Gandzasar Kapan	30	2	4	24	16	73	−57	10	Spared from relegation

Source: FFA
Rules for classification: 1) Points; 2) Head-to-head points; 3) Head-to-head goal difference; 4) Head-to-head goals scored; 5) Matches won; 6) Goal difference; 7) Less red cards; 8) Less yellow cards ; 9) Fair-play ranking 10) Draw
(C) Champions; (D) Disqualified; (R) Relegated

=== Armenian Cup ===
21 August 2024 First round	Andranik	0–3	Van	Charentsavan
16:30 (UTC+4)	Oublal (red card) 54'; Gamboa (yellow card) 87'; Melkonyan (yellow card) 90+3'	Report	John 21'; Farayola 39'; Bah (yellow card) 45+2'; Touré (yellow card) 90+1'; Diallo 90+3'	Stadium: City Stadium; Referee: Samvel Hovsepyan

1 October 2024 Second round	Shirak	0–3	Van	Gyumri
19:00 (UTC+4)	Doh (yellow card) 47'; Misakyan (yellow card) 48'; Mnatsakanyan (yellow card) (yellow-red card) 77'	Report	Touré 16', 45'; Batigi (yellow card) 48'; Okonkwo 63'; Drammeh (yellow card) 67'	Stadium: City Stadium; Referee: Vardan Manukyan

6 March 2025 Quarter-finals 1st leg	Van	3–0	West Armenia	Charentsavan
15:00 (UTC+4)	Nalbandyan 45' (pen.), 60'; Touré (penalty missed) 57' 58'	Report	Makhsudyan (yellow card) 24'; Désiré (yellow card) 46'	Stadium: City Stadium; Referee: Davit Mkrtchyan

2 April 2025 Quarter-finals 2nd leg	West Armenia	2–3 (2–6 agg.)	Van	Yerevan
16:00 (UTC+4)	Matyukhin 38' (o.g.); Grigoryan 90+3' (pen.)	Report	Okonkwo 17'; Akorede (yellow card) 31'; Gareginyan (yellow card) 34'; Vardanyan 45'; Odeyinka 65'	Stadium: Junior Sport Stadium; Referee: Artem Gasparyan

16 April 2025 Semi-final 1st leg	Noah	2–0	Van	Abovyan
18:30 (UTC+4)	Aiás 36'; Hambardzumyan (yellow card) 45+10'; Almeida (yellow card) 53'; Manvelyan (yellow card) 65'; Omar 89'	Report	Sargsyan (yellow card) 45+8'; Beglaryan (red card) 45+16'; Grigoryan (yellow card) 50'	Stadium: City Stadium; Referee: Yura Mahtesyan

30 April 2025 Semi-final 2nd leg	Van	1–0 (1–2 agg.)	Noah	Charentsavan
15:00 (UTC+4)	Odeyinka (yellow card) 25'; Akorede (yellow card) 33'; Bationo (yellow card) 57' (yellow-red card) 90'; Vardanyan 86'	Report	Eteki (yellow card) 26'; Čančarević (yellow card) 33'; Manvelyan (yellow card) 57'; Khudaverdyan (yellow card) 90+6'	Stadium: Charentsavan City Stadium; Referee: Ashot Harutyunyan

== Squad statistics ==
As of match played 28 May 2025

=== Appearances and goals ===
No.	Pos	Nat	Player	Total		Premier League		Armenian Cup	
No.	Pos	Nat	Player	Apps	Goals	Apps	Goals	Apps	Goals
2	DF	(Armenia) ARM	Serob Grigoryan	26	0	13+10	0	3	0
3	DF	(Nigeria) NGA	Emmanuel John	31	1	20+6	0	4+1	1
4	DF	(Armenia) ARM	Norayr Nikoghosyan	3	0	0+2	0	0+1	0
5	DF	(Armenia) ARM	Davit Terteryan	31	2	25+2	2	3+1	0
6	DF	(Russia) RUS	Yaroslav Matyukhin	24	0	15+5	0	4	0
7	MF	(Armenia) ARM	Karen Nalbandyan	33	9	28	7	5	2
8	MF	(Armenia) ARM	Yuri Gareginyan	27	0	15+7	0	4+1	0
9	FW	(Nigeria) NGA	Jesse Akila	24	5	5+16	5	0+3	0
10	FW	(Nigeria) NGA	Olawale Farayola	31	3	22+3	2	5+1	1
11	FW	(Guinea) GUI	Momo Touré	31	15	21+5	12	3+2	3
14	MF	(Nigeria) NGA	Izuchukwu Okonkwo	32	8	28	6	4	2
15	DF	(Armenia) ARM	Arsen Sadoyan	29	0	17+6	0	3+3	0
17	FW	(Armenia) ARM	Levon Vardanyan	18	3	1+14	1	1+2	2
19	MF	(Ivory Coast) CIV	Aliun Junior Dosso	4	0	1+1	0	0+2	0
22	DF	(Armenia) ARM	Robert Hakobyan	27	1	5+17	1	3+2	0
24	GK	(Armenia) ARM	Arsen Beglaryan	13	0	11	0	2	0
27	DF	(Ivory Coast) CIV	Julien Eymard Bationo	17	2	13	2	3+1	0
28	FW	(Nigeria) NGA	Usman Ajibona Akorede	13	2	6+4	2	2+1	0
31	GK	(Armenia) ARM	Anatoly Ayvazov	5	0	2	0	2+1	0
33	DF	(Armenia) ARM	Armen Sargsyan	2	0	0+1	0	0+1	0
44	DF	(Brazil) BRA	Klaidher Macedo	34	1	29	1	4+1	0
45	FW	(Nigeria) NGA	Malik Odeyinka	14	2	3+7	1	2+2	1
77	FW	(The Gambia) GAM	Kajally Drammeh	29	5	16+8	5	3+2	0
Players away on loan:
Players who left Van during the season:
10	FW	(Ghana) GHA	John Batigi	19	7	16+1	7	2	0
27	DF	(Sierra Leone) SLE	Citta Bah	1	0	0	0	1	0
31	GK	(Russia) RUS	Daniil Polyanski	19	0	17	0	2	0
99	FW	(Guinea) GUI	Mamadou Diallo	14	2	1+12	1	1	1

=== Goal scorers ===
Place	Position	Nation	Number	Name	Premier League	Armenian Cup	Total
1	FW	(Guinea)	11	Momo Touré	12	3	15
2	MF	(Armenia)	7	Karen Nalbandyan	7	2	9
3	MF	(Nigeria)	14	Izuchukwu Okonkwo	6	2	8
4	FW	(Ghana)	10	John Batigi	7	0	7
5	FW	(Nigeria)	9	Jesse Akila	5	0	5
6	FW	(The Gambia)	77	Kajally Drammeh	4	0	4
7	FW	(Nigeria)	10	Olawale Farayola	2	1	3
7	FW	(Armenia)	17	Levon Vardanyan	1	2	3
9	DF	(Armenia)	5	Davit Terteryan	2	0	2
9	DF	(Ivory Coast)	27	Julien Eymard Bationo	2	0	2
9	FW	(Nigeria)	28	Usman Ajibona Akorede	2	0	2
9	FW	(Guinea)	99	Mamadou Diallo	1	1	2
9	FW	(Nigeria)	45	Malik Odeyinka	1	1	2
14	DF	(Armenia)	22	Robert Hakobyan	1	0	1
14	DF	(Brazil)	44	Klaidher Macedo	1	0	1
14	DF	(Nigeria)	3	Emmanuel John	0	1	1
14				Own goal	1	0	1
				TOTALS	57	13	70'

=== Clean sheets ===
Place	Position	Nation	Number	Name	Premier League	Armenian Cup	Total
1	GK	(Russia)	31	Daniil Polyanski	7	2	9
2	GK	(Armenia)	24	Arsen Beglaryan	4	1	5
3	GK	(Armenia)	31	Anatoly Ayvazov	0	1	1
				TOTALS	11	4	15

=== Disciplinary record ===
Number	Nation	Position	Name	Premier League		Armenian Cup		Total	
Number	Nation	Position	Name	Booked	Sent off (straight red)	Booked	Sent off (straight red)	Booked	Sent off (straight red)
2	(Armenia)	DF	Serob Grigoryan	2	0	1	0	3	0
3	(Nigeria)	DF	Emmanuel John	4	1	0	0	4	1
4	(Armenia)	DF	Norayr Nikoghosyan	1	0	0	0	1	0
5	(Armenia)	DF	Davit Terteryan	4	0	0	0	4	0
6	(Russia)	DF	Yaroslav Matyukhin	3	1	0	0	3	1
7	(Armenia)	MF	Karen Nalbandyan	3	0	0	0	3	0
8	(Armenia)	MF	Yuri Gareginyan	5	0	1	0	6	0
9	(Nigeria)	FW	Jesse Akila	3	0	0	0	3	0
11	(Guinea)	FW	Momo Touré	9	1	1	0	10	1
14	(Nigeria)	MF	Izuchukwu Okonkwo	6	0	0	0	6	0
15	(Armenia)	DF	Arsen Sadoyan	1	0	0	0	1	0
19	(Ivory Coast)	MF	Aliun Junior Dosso	1	1	0	0	1	1
22	(Armenia)	DF	Robert Hakobyan	4	0	0	0	4	0
24	(Armenia)	GK	Arsen Beglaryan	0	0	0	1	0	1
27	(Ivory Coast)	DF	Julien Eymard Bationo	3	0	2	1	5	1
28	(Nigeria)	FW	Usman Ajibona Akorede	3	0	1	0	4	0
31	(Armenia)	GK	Anatoly Ayvazov	1	0	0	0	1	0
33	(Armenia)	MF	Armen Sargsyan	0	0	1	0	1	0
44	(Brazil)	DF	Klaidher Macedo	5	0	0	0	5	0
45	(Nigeria)	FW	Malik Odeyinka	1	0	1	0	2	0
77	(The Gambia)	FW	Kajally Drammeh	3	0	1	0	4	0
Players away on loan:
Players who left Van during the season:
10	(Ghana)	FW	John Batigi	2	0	1	0	3	0
27	(Sierra Leone)	DF	Citta Bah	0	0	1	0	1	0
31	(Russia)	GK	Daniil Polyanski	3	0	0	0	3	0
99	(Guinea)	FW	Mamadou Diallo	1	0	0	0	1	0
			TOTALS	67	4	12	2	79	6
