= Mamadou Diallo (footballer, born 1997) =

Guinean footballer

Personal information
- Full name: Adama Mamadou Diallo
- Date of birth: 31 October 1997 (age 29)
- Place of birth: Conakry, Guinea
- Position: Forward

Senior career*
Years	Team	Apps	(Gls)
–2021	Eléphant de Coléah		
2021–2022	Energetik-BGU Minsk	18	(4)
2022	→ Kaisar (loan)	25	(19)
2023	Turan	23	(16)
2024–2025	Van	13	(1)
2025	Syunik	10	(4)
- * Club domestic league appearances and goals as of 28 March 2025

Mamadou Diallo (born 31 October 1997) is a Guinean professional footballer and is currently a free agent.

== Career ==
On 3 August 2024, Armenian Premier League club Van announced the signing of Diallo to a one-year contract.

On 21 February 2025, Armenian First League club Syunik announced the signing of Diallo on a contract until the end of the season.
