= Daniil Polyansky =

Russian footballer

Personal information
- Full name: Daniil Sergeyevich Polyansky
- Date of birth: 18 February 2001 (age 25)
- Place of birth: Belgorod, Russia
- Height: 1.90 m (6 ft 3 in)
- Position: Goalkeeper

Team information
- Current team: Alashkert
- Number: 31

Youth career
- 2011–2017: Chertanovo Moscow
- 2018–2019: Energomash Shebekino

Senior career*
Years	Team	Apps	(Gls)
2019	Salyut Belgorod	0	(0)
2020	Volna Kovernino (amateur)		
2020–2021	Noravank	28	(0)
2022	Chita	9	(0)
2022–2023	Forte Taganrog	6	(0)
2023–2024	Novosibirsk	1	(0)
2024	Van	17	(0)
2025	Arsenal Dzerzhinsk	0	(0)
2025	Pyunik	0	(0)
2026	Asiagoal Bishkek	7	(0)
2026–	Alashkert	0	(0)
- * Club domestic league appearances and goals as of 28 October 2026

Daniil Sergeyevich Polyansky (Russian: Даниил Сергеевич Полянский; born 18 February 2001) is a Russian footballer who plays as a goalkeeper for Armenian Premier League club Alashkert.

== Club career ==
Polyansky made his debut in the Armenian First League for Noravank on 16 August 2020 in a game against BKMA Yerevan.

Polyansky made his debut in the Armenian Premier League for Noravank on 1 August 2021 in a game against Urartu.

Polyansky made his debut in the Russian Second League for Chita on 3 April 2022 in a game against Znamya Truda Orekhovo-Zuyevo.

On 20 June 2025, Armenian Premier League club Pyunik announced the signing of Polyansky from Arsenal Dzerzhinsk. On 14 December 2025, Pyunik announced the departure of Polyansky.

On 17 February 2026, Kyrgyz Premier League club Asiagoal Bishkek announced the signing of Polyansky.
