= Albert Mnatsakanyan =

Armenian and Russian footballer

Personal information
- Full name: Albert Grachayevich Mnatsakanyan
- Date of birth: 9 September 1999 (age 27)
- Place of birth: Vagharshapat, Armenia
- Height: 1.83 m (6 ft 0 in)
- Position: Midfielder

Team information
- Current team: Van
- Number: 23

Youth career
- –2013: PFC CSKA Moscow
- 2013–2017: FC Spartak Moscow

Senior career*
Years	Team	Apps	(Gls)
2017	FC Ararat-2 Moscow		
2018–2019	Yerevan	10	(1)
2019	FC Ararat-2 Moscow		
2019–2020	Ararat Yerevan	1	(0)
2020–2021	Tekstilshchik Ivanovo	24	(0)
2022	Alashkert	3	(1)
2022	Kuban-Holding Pavlovskaya	13	(0)
2023–2024	Van	22	(0)
2025	Gonio	1	(0)
2025–	Van	3	(0)

International career^{‡}
2016	Armenia U-17	5	(1)
2016	Armenia U-19	7	(0)
- * Club domestic league appearances and goals as of 11 December 2025 ‡ National team caps and goals as of 12 November 2016

Albert Grachayevich Mnatsakanyan (Russian: Альберт Грачаевич Мнацаканян; born 9 September 1999) is an Armenian and Russian football player who plays for Armenian club Van.

== Club career ==
He made his debut in the Russian Football National League for FC Tekstilshchik Ivanovo on 24 October 2020 in a game against FC Shinnik Yaroslavl.
