= Andriy Markovych =

Ukrainian footballer

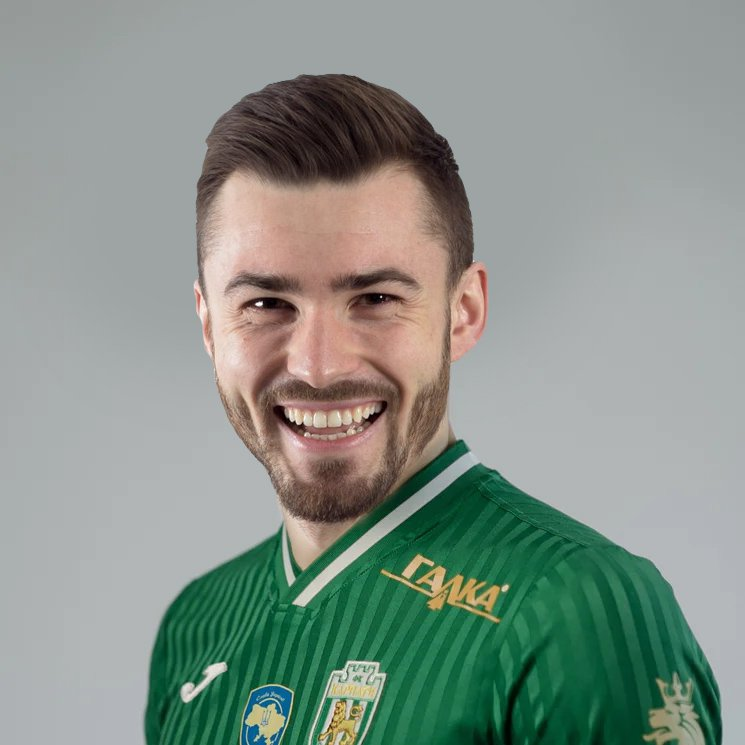

Personal information
- Full name: Andriy Mykhaylovych Markovych
- Date of birth: 25 June 1995 (age 31)
- Place of birth: Melnych, Lviv Oblast, Ukraine
- Height: 1.75 m (5 ft 9 in)
- Position: Defender

Team information
- Current team: Van
- Number: 26

Youth career
- Youth Sport School Zhydachiv
- 2008–2012: Karpaty Lviv

Senior career*
Years	Team	Apps	(Gls)
2012–2018	Karpaty Lviv	6	(0)
2017	→ Naftan Novopolotsk (loan)	13	(0)
2017	→ Rukh Vynnyky (loan)	9	(0)
2018	→ Nõmme Kalju (loan)	32	(1)
2019–2021	Nõmme Kalju	89	(3)
2022	Karpaty Lviv	0	(0)
2022	→ Nõmme Kalju (loan)	12	(0)
2023–2024	FC Santa Coloma	29	(2)
2024–2025	Ravshan Kulob	30	(2)
2026–	Van	11	(0)

International career^{‡}
2011	Ukraine U16	3	(0)
2011	Ukraine U17	1	(0)
2013–2014	Ukraine U19	8	(0)
2015	Ukraine U20	2	(0)
- * Club domestic league appearances and goals as of 18 June 2026 ‡ National team caps and goals as of 14 November 2018

Andriy Mykhaylovych Markovych (Ukrainian: Андрій Михайлович Маркович; born 25 June 1995) is a Ukrainian professional footballer who plays as a defender for Armenian Premier League club Van.

== Club career ==
Markovych is a product of the Zhydachiv and UFK Karpaty Lviv Youth School Systems. He made his debut for FC Karpaty entering as a second-half substitute against FC Chornomorets Odesa on 10 May 2015 in Ukrainian Premier League.

=== Nõmme Kalju ===
On 22 February 2018, Markovych joined Estonian Meistriliiga club Nõmme Kalju on a one-year loan contract.

In January 2019, he signed a two-year contract with the team.

== International career ==
He also plays for different youth Ukrainian national football representations.

== Honours ==
Nõmme Kalju

- Meistriliiga: 2018
- Estonian Supercup: 2019
