= David Kirakosyan =

Russian footballer (born 2006)

Personal information
- Full name: David Vaganovich Kirakosyan
- Date of birth: 13 July 2006 (age 20)
- Place of birth: Shebekino, Russia
- Height: 1.84 m (6 ft 0 in)
- Position: Attacking midfielder

Team information
- Current team: Spartak Kostroma
- Number: 73

Youth career
- Torpedo Shebekino
- –2018: DYuSSh №6 Belgorod
- 2019–2021: Zenit Saint Petersburg
- 2022: Akron–Konoplyov football academy
- 2023: Sochi

Senior career*
| Years | Team | Apps | (Gls) |
| 2023–2026 | Sochi | 0 | (0) |
| 2024 | → Avangard Kursk (loan) | 17 | (0) |
| 2025 | → Sochi-2 | 14 | (1) |
| 2025–2026 | → Van | 11 | (1) |
| 2026 | Alashkert | 3 | (0) |
| 2026– | Spartak Kostroma | 6 | (0) |

International career^{‡}
| 2024 | Armenia U-19 | 1 | (0) |
| 2025– | Armenia U-21 | 6 | (0) |
- * Club domestic league appearances and goals as of 18 September 2026 ‡ National team caps and goals as of 5 October 2026

David Vaganovich Kirakosyan (Armenian: Դավիթ Կիրակոսյան; Russian: Давид Ваганович Киракосян; born 13 July 2006) is a football player who plays as an attacking midfielder for Spartak Kostroma. Born in Russia, he represents Armenia internationally.

== Career ==
Kirakosyan made his debut for Sochi on 9 August 2023 in a Russian Cup game against Orenburg.

He made his Russian Second League debut for Avangard Kursk on 21 July 2024 in a game against Kuban Krasnodar.

He made his Armenian Premier League debut for Van on 15 August 2025 in a game against Urartu.

== Career statistics ==
As of 25 May 2024

| Club | Season | League | | | Cup | | Continental | | Total | |
| Club | Season | Division | Apps | Goals | Apps | Goals | Apps | Goals | Apps | Goals |
|---|---|---|---|---|---|---|---|---|---|---|
| Sochi | 2023–24 | Russian Premier League | 0 | 0 | 1 | 0 | – | | 1 | 0 |
| Career total | | | 0 | 0 | 1 | 0 | 0 | 0 | 1 | 0 |
