= Allef (footballer, born 1994) =

Brazilian footballer

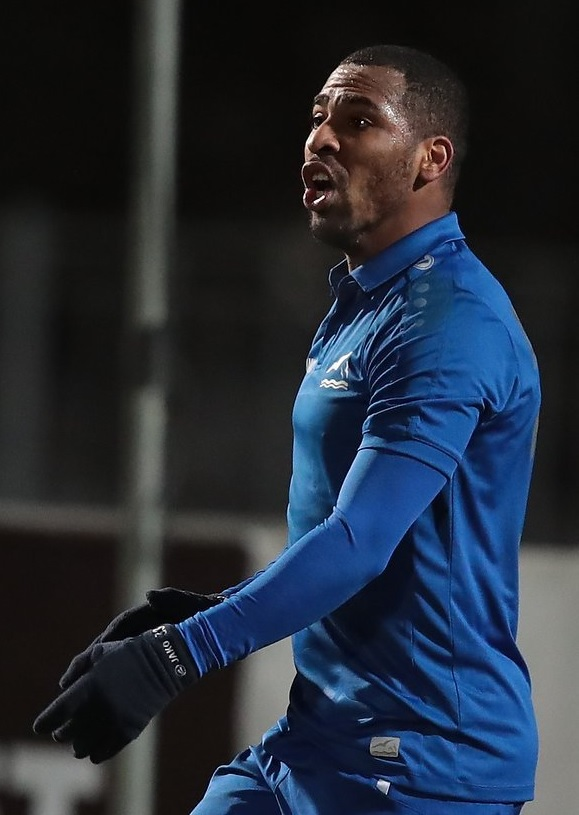
- Allef with Baltika Kaliningrad in 2019

Personal information
- Full name: Allef de Andrade Rodrigues
- Date of birth: 4 November 1994 (age 32)
- Place of birth: Sento Sé, Brazil
- Height: 1.74 m (5 ft 9 in)
- Position: Forward

Senior career*
Years	Team	Apps	(Gls)
2012	Confiança		
2013	Petrolina		
2013	Santa Cruz		
2014	FF Sport		
2014	Petrolina		
2015–2016	1º de Dezembro	12	(4)
2016	Mafra	16	(8)
2017	Real	13	(4)
2017–2019	Vitória de Setúbal	14	(1)
2019–2021	Baltika Kaliningrad	43	(15)
2021–2022	Atyrau	3	(1)
2023	Volga Ulyanovsk	8	(0)
2023–2024	Noah	3	(0)
2025–2026	Van	4	(1)
- * Club domestic league appearances and goals as of 4 June 2026

Allef de Andrade Rodrigues (born 4 November 1994) is a Brazilian footballer who last played for Van.

== Career ==
On 24 July 2021, Atyrau announced the signing of Allef.

On 21 July 2023, Allef was announced as a new signing for Armenian Premier League club FC Noah, alongside Nico Varela and Martim Maia.

On 30 August 2025, Armenian Premier League club Van announced the signing of Allef after he'd come on as a substitute in Van's 0–0 draw with BKMA Yerevan on 29 August 2025.
