= Hollman McCormick =

Colombian footballer (born 2005)

Personal information
- Full name: Hollman Camilo McCormick Pinzón
- Date of birth: October 28, 2005 (age 21)
- Place of birth: Bogotá, Colombia
- Position: Forward

Team information
- Current team: Van
- Number: 28

Youth career
- –2020: Independiente Santa Fe

Senior career*
Years	Team	Apps	(Gls)
2020–2024	Independiente Santa Fe	2	(0)
2022	→ Tigres (loan)	5	(0)
2024–2025	Torreense	0	(0)
2025–	Van	2	(0)
- * Club domestic league appearances and goals as of 11 December 2025

Hollman Camilo McCormick Pinzón (born 28 October 2005) is a Colombian professional footballer who plays as a forward for Van.

== Club career ==
On 22 October 2020, just six days before his 15th birthday, McCormick made his professional debut with Independiente Santa Fe in a 3–1 Copa Colombia win against Patriotas Boyacá. On 12 May 2021 he made his Copa Libertadores debut in 2021 Copa Libertadores loss to Fluminense, becoming, at the age of 15 years, six months, and 14 days, the second-youngest player ever to appear in the Copa Libertadores, only behind Diego Suárez, who set the record in 2017 at the age of 14.

In February 2024, he joined Portuguese side Torreense on a permanent deal, initially linking up with their under–23 team.

On 29 August 2025, McCormick joined Armenian Premier League side Van.

== International career ==
He received his first call-up to the Colombia under-17 team in November 2020. In 2021, the Football Association of Ireland investigated whether the 15-year-old McCormick was eligible to play for the Republic of Ireland national team, which he is since his grandfather was of Irish heritage.
