= Danila Bokov =

Russian footballer

Personal information
- Full name: Danila Maksimovich Bokov
- Date of birth: 9 August 2002 (age 24)
- Place of birth: Moscow, Russia
- Height: 1.85 m (6 ft 1 in)
- Position: Goalkeeper

Team information
- Current team: Van
- Number: 45

Youth career
- –2021: Khimki
- 2011–2021: CSKA Moscow

Senior career*
Years	Team	Apps	(Gls)
2021–2025	CSKA Moscow	0	(0)
2023	→ Salyut Belgorod (loan)	10	(0)
2023–2024	→ Chayka Peschanokopskoye (loan)	23	(0)
2025–	Van	20	(0)
- * Club domestic league appearances and goals as of 8 June 2026

Danila Maksimovich Bokov (Russian: Данила Максимович Боков; born 9 August 2002) is a Russian football player who plays as a goalkeeper for Armenian club Van.

== Club career ==
He was first included in the matchday squads of CSKA Moscow as a back-up goalkeeper in February 2021. He made his debut for the main squad of CSKA Moscow on 26 October 2021 in a Russian Cup game against Metallurg Lipetsk. He substituted Vladislav Torop in the 73rd minute after Torop was injured, as first-choice goalkeeper Igor Akinfeev was given rest for this game.

On 30 December 2021, he extended his contract with CSKA until the end of the 2022–23 season.

On 17 February 2023, Bokov was loaned by Salyut Belgorod. He made his debut in the Russian Second League for Salyut Belgorod on 2 April 2023, in a game against Rodina-2 Moscow.

On 12 July 2023, he moved on a new loan to Chayka Peschanokopskoye.

Bokov left CSKA on 30 June 2025.

On 30 July 2025, Armenian Premier League club Van announced the signing of Bokov. He made his debut in the Armenian Premier League for Van on 29 August 2025 in a game against BKMA Yerevan.

== Personal life ==
His father Maksim Bokov is a former Russian international defender who is best known for playing for FC Zenit Saint Petersburg and PFC CSKA Moscow.

== Career statistics ==
As of 26 November 2022

Club	Season	League			Cup		Continental		Other		Total	
Club	Season	Division	Apps	Goals	Apps	Goals	Apps	Goals	Apps	Goals	Apps	Goals
CSKA Moscow	2020–21	RPL	0	0	0	0	–		–		0	0
CSKA Moscow	2021–22	RPL	0	0	1	0	–		–		1	0
CSKA Moscow	2022–23	RPL	0	0	0	0	–		–		0	0
Career total			0	0	1	0	0	0	0	0	1	0
