= Charentsavan =

City in Kotayk, Armenia

Charentsavan Չարենցավան
- Town
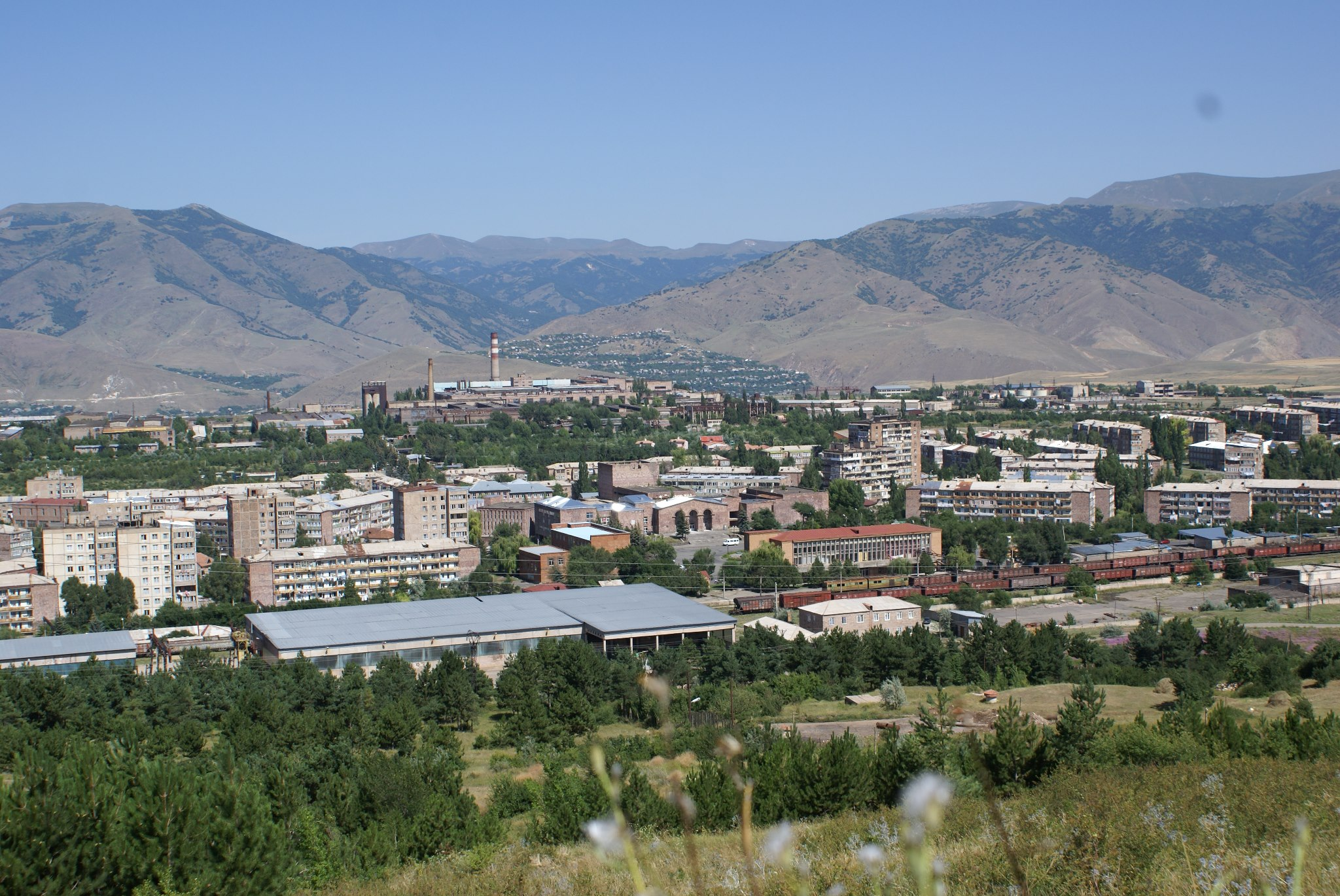
- Charentsavan

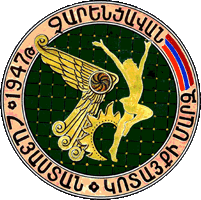
- Coat of arms

- Location within Armenia
- Coordinates: 40°24′35″N 44°38′35″E
- Country: Armenia
- Marz (Province): Kotayk
- Founded: 1948

Government
  - Mayor: Hakob Shahgeltyan

Area
  - Total: 5 km^{2} (1.9 sq mi)
- Elevation: 1,660 m (5,450 ft)

Population (2022 census)
  - Total: 22,071
  - Density: 4,400/km^{2} (11,000/sq mi)
- Time zone: UTC+4
- Area code: +374 (226)
- Website: Sources: Population

Charentsavan (Armenian: Չարենցավան), is a town and urban municipal community in the Kotayk Province of Armenia. It was founded in 1947 as Lusavan, and renamed in 1967 after the Armenian poet Yeghishe Charents. According to the 2022 census, Charentsavan had a population of 22,071.

== Etymology ==
The town was known as Lusavan until September 1967, when, on the recommendation of Anastas Mikoyan, it was renamed Charentsavan, after Yeghishe Charents. Charentsavan is composed of two words: Charents (Armenian: Չարենց) and avan (Armenian: ավան), literally meaning the "town of Charents".

== History ==
Charentsavan was founded by the Soviet government in 1948 as Lusavan within the Akhta raion (later renamed Hrazdan raion in 1959) to accommodate the employees of the nearby hydroelectric power plant of Gyumush. With the completion of the power plant in 1953, the town became home to many industrial firms and turned into one of the vital industrial centres of the Armenian SSR.

Around 2/3rd of the town's economy was based on mechanical industries. In 1958, the reinforced concrete plant of Charentsavan was opened, followed by the machine-tools plant in 1959. In 1966, the "Kentronadzul" metal casting plant was opened to become the largest industrial firm of the town. 4 more factories were opened in the 1970s, including the "Lizin" chemicals plant in 1974, the "ArmAuto" metal structures and goods plant and "Bjni" water bottling plant in 1977, and the knitting plant in 1978.

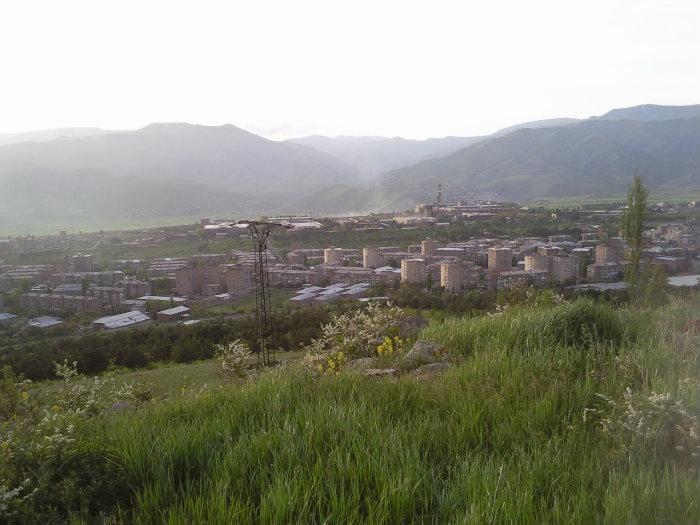
Charentsavan landscape

Several products of Charentsavan were delivered to the republics of the Soviet Union.

With the industrial growth of the town, the population had grown as well to reach up to 25,000 by the end of the 1970s.

The major urban plan of the town designed by architects Avetik Mirijanyan and M. Safrastyan, was approved in 1971. It was envisaged to expand the town to accommodate a population of 65,000 by the end of the 20th century. The population of Charentsavan was in its peak in 1989 with around 33,000.

However, with the dissolution of the Soviet Union in 1991, many of the industrial plants were privatized and forced to reduce their capacities due to the economic recession. The population of the town dropped to 25,000 by the end of the 20th century. As per the 1995 administrative reforms, the Soviet raions were dissolved and the administrative provinces of Armenia were formed. Thus, Charentsavan became part of the newly-founded Kotayk Province.

The town is roughly divided into 4 residential districts as well as a large industrial zone. The industrial district occupies around 70% of the entire area of Charentsavan. A large public park is situated between the industrial zone and the residential area.

The town and the region are served by the state-owned Charentsavan Medical Center, operating since 1967 with a capacity of 300 beds.

== Geography and climate ==
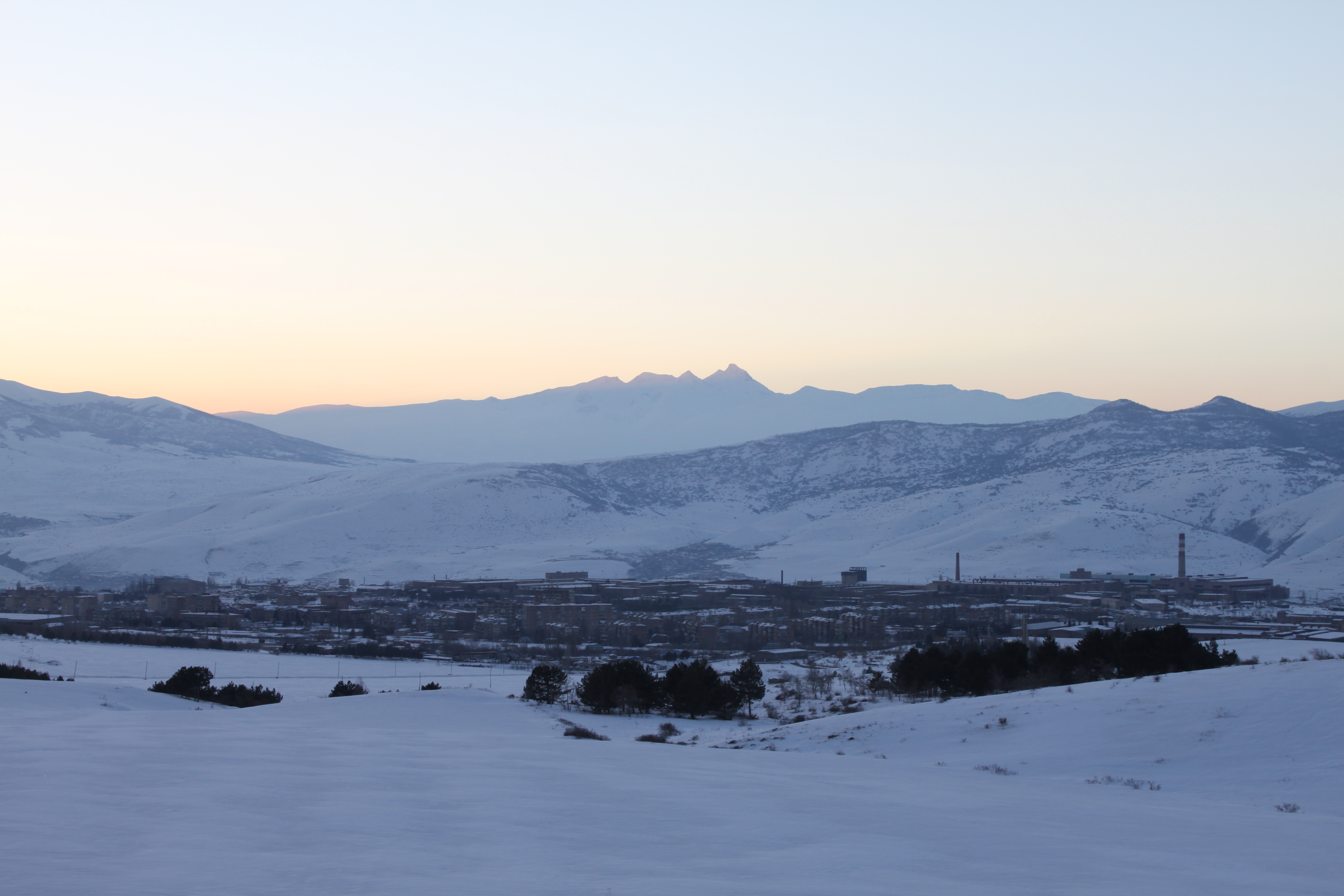
Charentsavan in winter

Charentsavan is located around 38 km north of the capital Yerevan on the left side of Hrazdan River, at a height ranging between 1600 and 1700 meters above sea level. It is bordered by the village of Alapars from the northwest.

The area of modern-day Charentsavan was part of the "Mazaz" canton within the Ayrarat province of Ancient Armenia.

The climate of Charentsavan is characterized with cold and severe winters and mild summers and classified as a warm summer humid continental (Köppen Dfb). In winters, the town usually experiences very cold weather reaching down to -25. Snow sticks on the ground from December until March. However, the snow season usually extends from October through May.

Summer in Charentsavan is warm with brisk and cool nights.

Climate data for Charentsavan
Month	Jan	Feb	Mar	Apr	May	Jun	Jul	Aug	Sep	Oct	Nov	Dec	Year
Mean daily maximum °F (°C)	32 (0)	33 (1)	41 (5)	53 (12)	62 (17)	70 (21)	77 (25)	77 (25)	71 (22)	60 (16)	47 (8)	36 (2)	55 (13)
Mean daily minimum °F (°C)	15 (−9)	16 (−9)	24 (−4)	32 (0)	40 (4)	46 (8)	52 (11)	53 (12)	45 (7)	37 (3)	29 (−2)	21 (−6)	34 (1)
Average precipitation inches (mm)	0.71 (18)	0.91 (23)	1.26 (32)	2.61 (66)	3.27 (83)	2.68 (68)	1.57 (40)	1.30 (33)	1.06 (27)	1.50 (38)	1.14 (29)	0.75 (19)	18.76 (476)
Source: http://en.climate-data.org/location/21593/

== Demographics ==
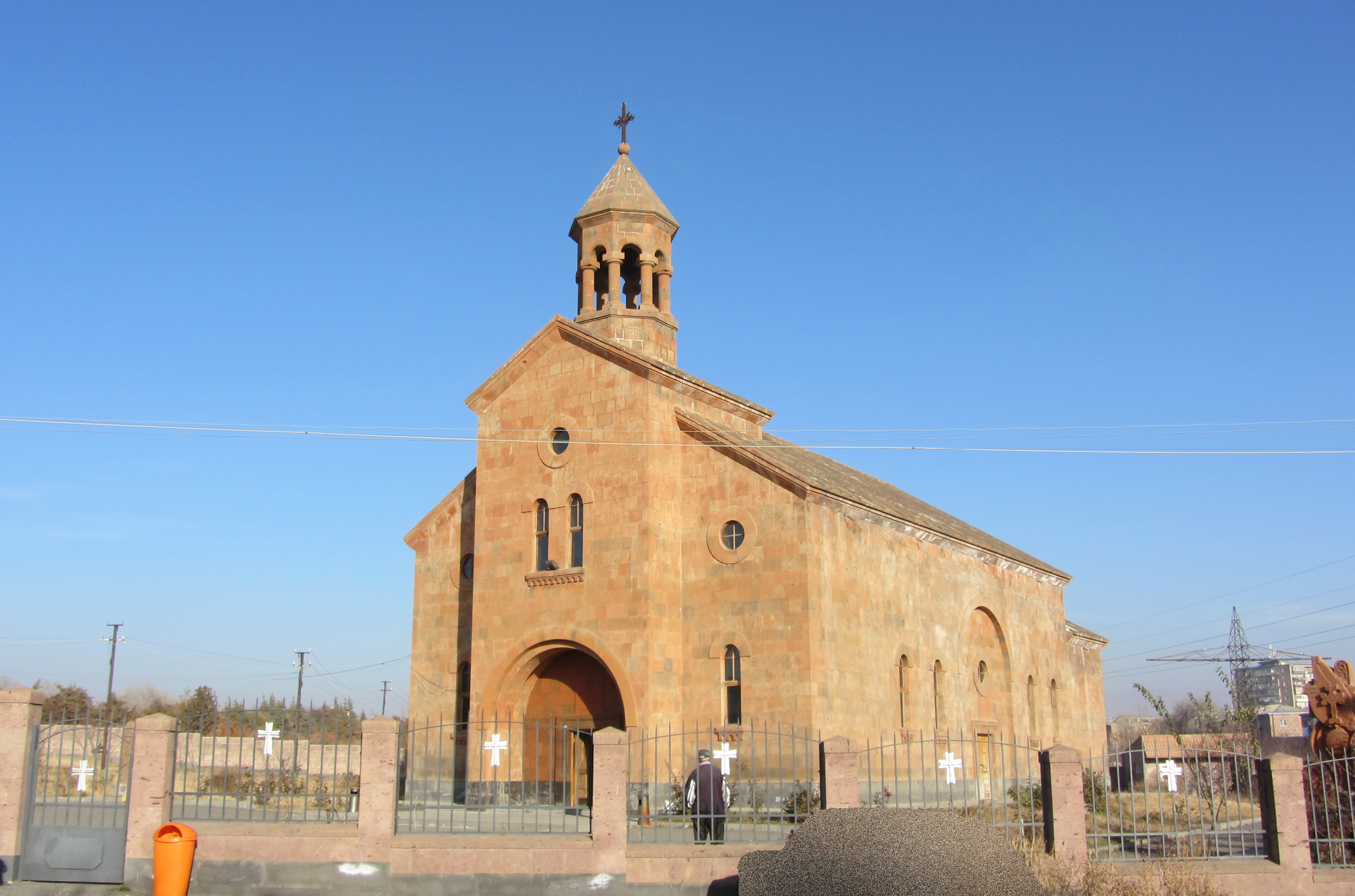
The Holy Saviour's Church

Historical population
Year	Pop.	±% p.a.
1979	24,590	—
1989	32,229	+2.74%
2001	25,039	−2.08%
2011	20,363	−2.05%
2022	22,071	+0.73%
2024	22,763	+1.56%

== Culture ==
Charentsavan has a palace of culture located at the central Karen Demirchyan Square. The town is also home to a public library with an American corner, entirely renovated in 2010 with the financial assistance of the US Embassy in Yerevan. The town has also a school of art named after Jean Carzou, serving more than 600 children.

The entrance to Charentsavan is decorated with the statue of the "curly-haired boy of Charents", erected in 1980.

The statue of Yeghishe Charents was erected in October 2013 in front of the palace of culture.

The Soviet-era cinema theatre of Charentsavan is currently out of service.

== Transportation ==
The M-4 motorway that crosses the republic from north to south passes through the eastern vicinity of Charentsavan.

The town is also served by a railway station connected with Yerevan and Gyumri.

Taxi service companies are also available in the town.

== Economy ==
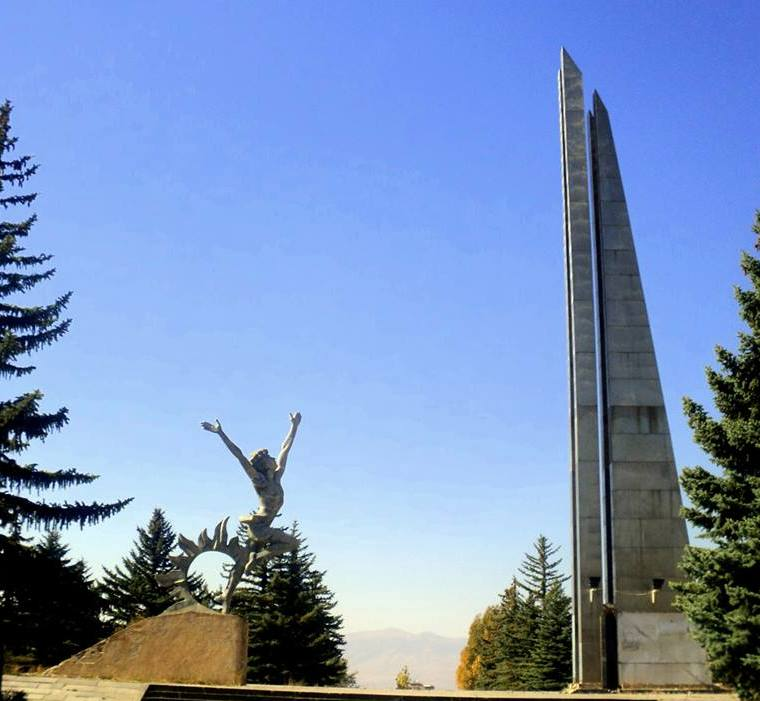
The entrance to the town and the statue of the curly-haired boy

Charentsavan used to be one of the major industrial centres of Soviet Armenia. With the dissolution of the Soviet Union, many of the industrial plants were forced to reduce their capacity or even shut their doors.

However, with the economic revival of Armenia during the end of the 1990s and beginning of the 2000s, many of the industrial plants of Charentsavan have been reopened as private companies. Thus, the "ArmAuto" metal structures plant was reopened in 1992 as "ArmAuto" Open joint-stock company, the "Lizin" chemicals plant was reopened in 1994 as "Lizin" OJSC, the "Kentronadzul" metal casting plant was reopened in 1997 as "Dzulakentron" OJSC. and the "Bjni" mineral waters factory reopened in 2010 as "RRR" mineral waters plant. The Charentsavan machine-tools plants is still operating as a state-owned enterprise.

New industrial plants were also opened in tho town such as the "Khorda" Hydroturbines Manufacturing Enterprise founded in 2006, the "ASCE Group" steel casting enterprise opened in 2013 and the "Lubawa Armenia" Armenian-Polish enterprise for safety and military equipments products founded in 2014.

The Chamber of commerce and industry of Kotayk Province opened in 2002, is based Charentsavan.

== Education ==
As of 2017, Charentsavan is home to 6 public education school as well as the State College of Charentsavan, which is an intermediate education institute operating since 1964. The college allows its graduates to continue their study in other universities of Armenia.

== Sport ==
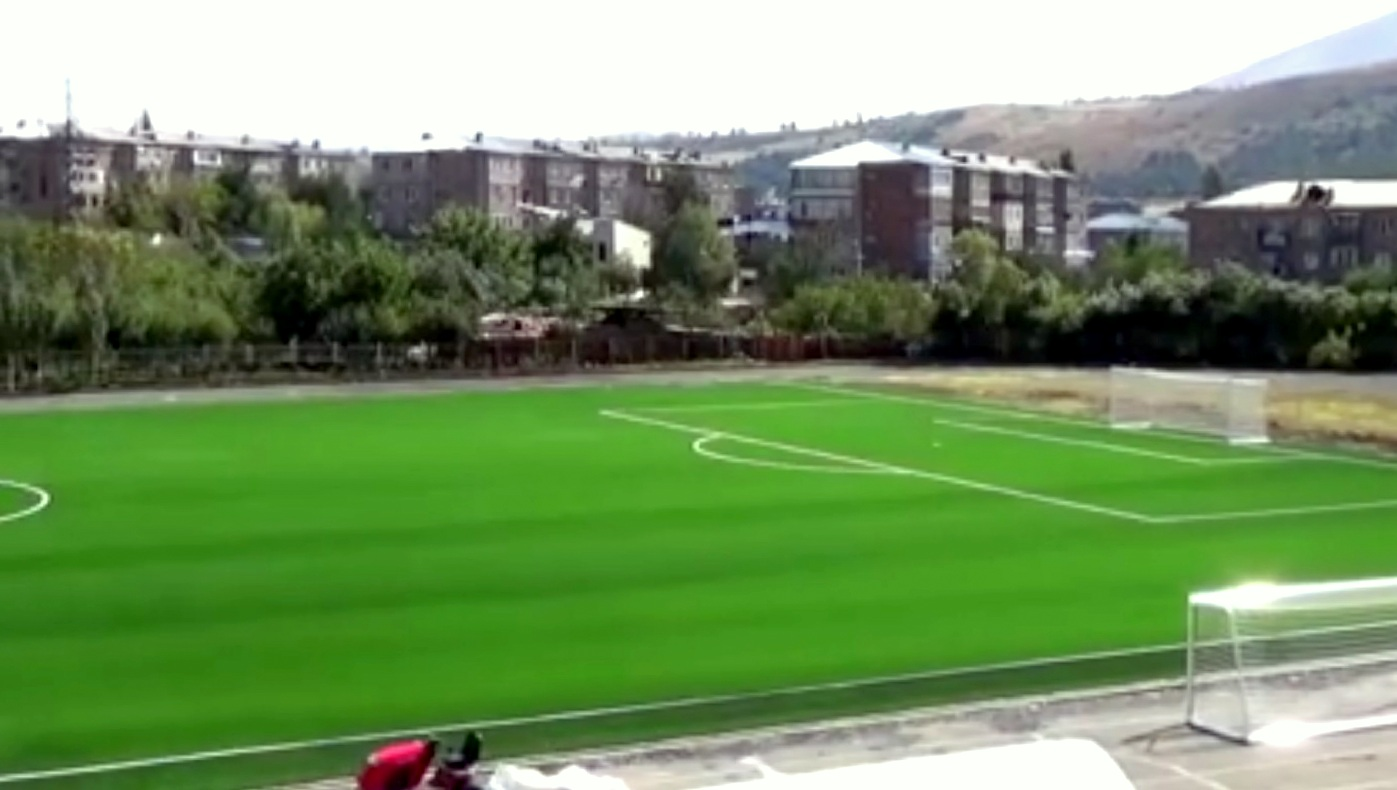
Charentsavan City Stadium

FC Moush Charentsavan was a football club representing the town of Charentsavan. They used to play their games at the Charentsavan City Stadium, opened in 1970. However, the club was dissolved in 1994 and is currently inactive from professional football. In 2019, FC Van was founded to represent the town in domestic football competitions.

The playing field of the Charentsavan City Stadium was modernized by the end of 2016, when the natural pitch was replaced with an artificial turf.

== See also ==
- Yeghishe Charents
