= Artur Daniyelyan =

Armenian footballer

Personal information
- Full name: Artur Hehamovych Daniyelyan
- Date of birth: 9 February 1998 (age 28)
- Place of birth: Taverivka, Poltava Oblast, Ukraine
- Height: 1.82 m (6 ft 0 in)
- Position: Defender

Youth career
- 2012–2013: Molod Poltava
- 2013–2015: Metalurh Donetsk

Senior career*
Years	Team	Apps	(Gls)
2015–2018	Stal Kamianske	20	(0)
2018–2021	Ararat-Armenia	32	(1)
2021	Ararat Yerevan	5	(0)
2021–2022	Sevan FC	12	(0)
2022	Panserraikos	3	(0)
2022–2024	Noah	29	(0)
2024–2025	West Armenia	20	(2)
2025	Fratria	4	(0)
2025	Van	5	(1)

International career^{‡}
2014	Armenia U17	1	(0)
2016	Armenia U19	2	(0)
2019–2020	Armenia U21	6	(1)
- * Club domestic league appearances and goals as of 13:14, 15 December 2025 (UTC) ‡ National team caps and goals as of 28 June 2023

Artur Hehamovych Daniyelyan (Armenian: Արթուր Դանիելյան; Ukrainian: Артур Гегамович Данієлян; born 9 February 1998) is a professional footballer who plays as a defender. Born in Ukraine, he has represented Armenia at youth level.

== Club career ==
Daniyelyan is the product of the FC Molod Poltava sportive school system. He spent a large part of his career as a player in two clubs of the Ukrainian Premier League Reserves.

He made his debut in the Ukrainian Premier League, playing as a substituted player in the main-squad team in a match of FC Stal against FC Chornomorets Odesa on 14 May 2016. In November 2017, at only 19 years old, he was elected Man Of The Match in a game against Shakhtar Donetsk that ended with a 1–1 draw. Profootball.ua wrote: "One of the main contributors to Stal's success was Artur Daniyelyan. He stood out with a selfless and sacrificed performance, making no mistake against the champions, that helped his team draw one point from the game."

On 7 January 2021, Daniyelyan left Ararat-Armenia mutual consent.

On 18 July 2025, he moved to Bulgaria to join Second League team Fratria. He was released just 3 months later, after playing in 4 games.

On 19 September 2025, Danielyan returned to the Armenian Premier League, signing for FC Van. On 14 December 2025, Van announced the departure of Danielyan.

== International career ==
He was called up to the Armenia national under-17 football team and made his debut in the match against Belarus national under-17 football team on 25 June 2014. He's also had a few call ups and two caps for the Armenia national under-19 football team.

== Honours ==
=== Club ===
Ararat-Armenia

- Armenian Premier League (2): 2018–19, 2019–20
- Armenian Supercup (1): 2019
