= FC Van =

Armenian football club

Van
- Full name: Football Club Van
- Founded: 2019; 7 years ago
- Ground: Charentsavan City Stadium
- Capacity: 5,000
- Owner: Oleg Ghukasov
- President: Sergei Ghukasov
- Manager: Artur Asoyan
- League: Armenian Premier League
- 2025–26: Armenian Premier League, 6th
- Website: van-fc.am
Home colours	Away colours

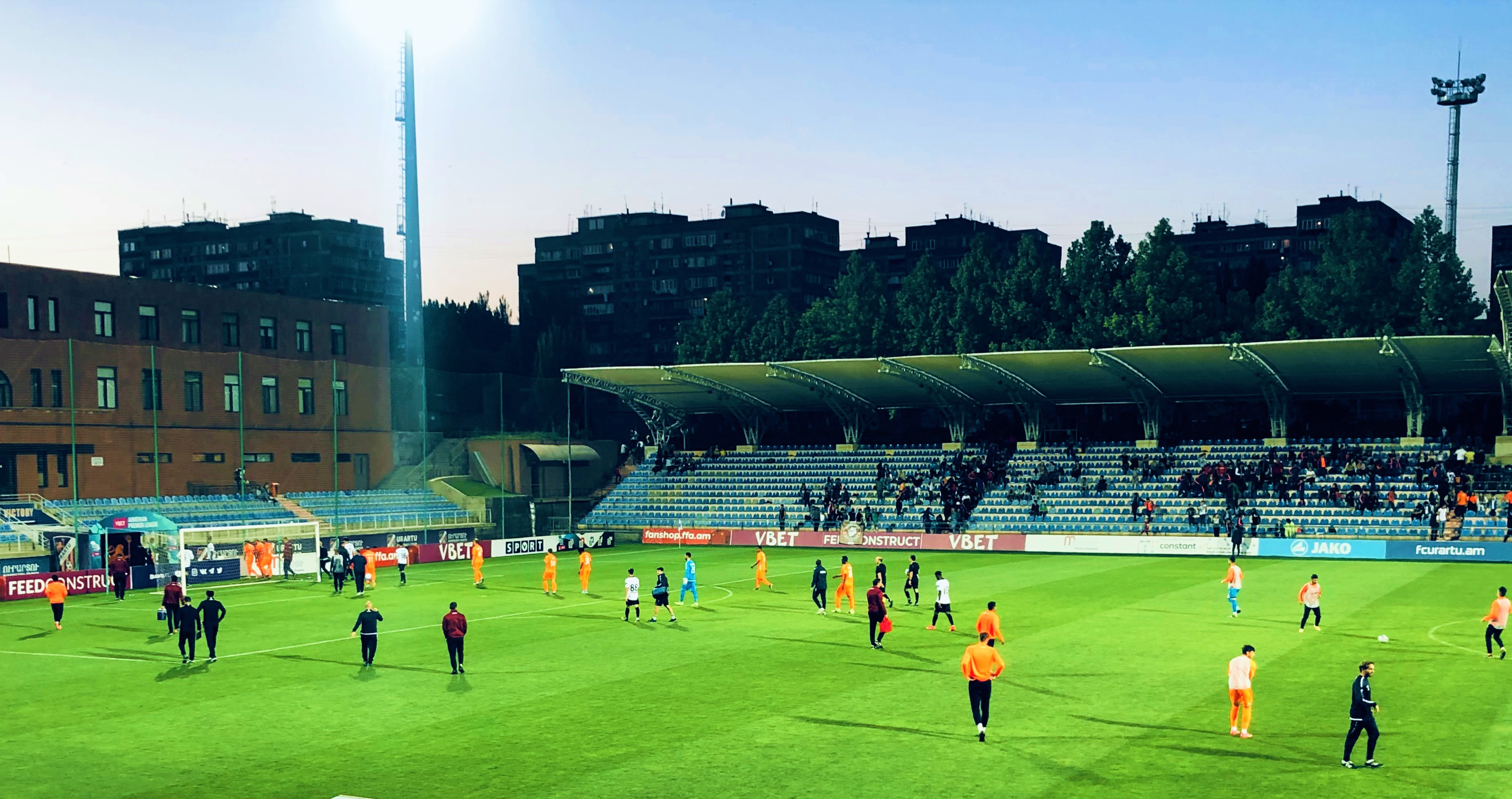
Van playing against Urartu Yerevan (Armenian Premier League, 11 May 2021)

Football Club Van (Armenian: Ֆուտբոլային Ակումբ Վան) is an Armenian semi-professional football village club based in Charentsavan, Kotayk Province.

== History ==
FC Van was founded on 31 May 2019 in the town of Charentsavan, Kotayk Province, by Armenian-Russian businessman Oleg Ghukasov. The club will take part in the 2019–20 Armenian First League season.

On 30 July 2020, it was announced that Van had been given a license to compete in the Armenian Premier League for the 2020–21 season. On 31 August 2026 club admitted its semi-professional status.

=== Supporter ===
The club is known to have only one supporter.

=== Domestic ===
Season	League									National Cup	Top goalscorer		Manager
Season	Div.	Pos.	Pl.	W	D	L	GS	GA	P	National Cup	Name	Goals	Manager
2019–20	Armenian First League	1	28	22	4	2	90	18	70	Quarterfinal	(Ivory Coast) Wilfried Eza	32	(Armenia) Karen Barseghyan
2020–21	Armenian Premier League	6	24	9	4	11	25	30	31	Quarterfinal	(Ivory Coast) Wilfried Eza	8	(Armenia) Sevada Arzumanyan (Armenia) Artur Asoyan
2021–22	Armenian Premier League	8	32	6	7	19	19	47	25	Semifinal	(Armenia) Zaven Badoyan	4	(Armenia) Artur Asoyan (Armenia) Sevada Arzumanyan
2022–23	Armenian Premier League	5	36	11	7	18	38	59	40	Quarterfinal	(Armenia) Edgar Movsesyan	9	(Armenia) Artur Asoyan (Bolivia) Humberto Viviani
2023–24	Armenian Premier League	9	36	8	7	20	32	67	32	Quarterfinal	(Nigeria) Christopher Boniface	8	(Armenia) Sevada Arzumanyan (Armenia) Arthur Hovhannisyan
2024–25	Armenian Premier League	5	30	15	7	8	56	36	52	Semi-final	(Guinea) Momo Touré	12	(Armenia) Vahe Gevorgyan
2025–26	Armenian Premier League	6	27	9	4	14	27	40	31	Round of 16	(Brazil) Eriki	4	(Armenia) Edgar Torosyan (Armenia) Arthur Asoyan

== Current squad ==
As of 19 October 2026

Note: Flags indicate national team as defined under FIFA eligibility rules; some limited exceptions apply. Players may hold more than one non-FIFA nationality.

No.	Pos.	Nation	Player
2	DF	COL	Javier Torres
3	DF	ARM	Artur Kartashyan
5	DF	ARM	Hovhannes Gevorgyan
6	MF	ARM	Gabriel Yeghiazaryan
7	MF	ARM	Petros Avetisyan
9	MF	ARM	Tigran Sargsyan
10	MF	ARM	Narek Manukyan
11	FW	ARM	Aris Karapetyan (on loan from Pyunik)
12	GK	ARM	Poghos Ayvazyan
13	MF	BRA	Alex Silva
14	FW	NGR	Prince Obinna
15	DF	NGR	Adebayo Akanni
17	FW	NGR	Khalil Sammani (on loan from Alashkert)
19	DF	ARM	Vaspurak Minasyan
20	MF	BRA	Iago Viana

No.	Pos.	Nation	Player
21	MF	ZAM	Chimuka Lweendo
22	DF	ARM	Yuri Martirosyan
23	DF	NGR	Ibrahim Daniel
25	DF	GHA	Enoch Nkrumah
27	DF	CIV	Josue Gaba
28	FW	CIV	Kone Boukari
33	DF	ARM	Taron Voskanyan
36	MF	ARM	Vahram Makhsudyan (on loan from Ararat-Armenia)
38	MF	ARM	Tigran Gevorgyan (on loan from Pyunik)
45	GK	RUS	Danila Bokov
50	DF	BEL	Sargis Gaboyan
59	GK	ARM	Hunan Gyurjinyan
77	FW	BRA	Brayann Santiago
99	MF	BRA	Nascimento

For recent transfers, see Transfers summer 2026 and Transfers winter 2026–27.

=== Out on loan ===
Note: Flags indicate national team as defined under FIFA eligibility rules; some limited exceptions apply. Players may hold more than one non-FIFA nationality.

No.	Pos.	Nation	Player

== Personnel ==
=== Management ===
Position	Name
President	(Turkey) Sergei Ghukasov
Vice-president	(Armenia) Karen Barseghyan
General Manager	(Armenia) Sevada Arzumanyan
Executive Director	(Armenia) Gagik Galstyan
Press Secretary	(Armenia) Arsen Antikyan

=== Technical staff ===
Position	Name
Head coach	(Turkmenistan) Artur Asoyan
Assistant coach	(Armenia) Arshak Mkrtchyan
Assistant coach	(France) Michael Gaudriller
Goalkeepers Coach	(Armenia) Slavik Sukiasyan
Fitness coach	(Armenia) Georgi Ghazaryan

== Managerial history ==
As of match played 20 March 2026

Name	Nat.	From	To	P	W	D	L	GS	GA	%W	Honours	Notes
Karen Barseghyan	Armenia	31 May 2019	31 July 2020	28	22	4	2	90	18	78.57	Armenian First League (1)	
Sevada Arzumanyan	Armenia	31 July 2020	2 February 2021	13	4	2	7	9	11	30.77		
Artur Asoyan	Armenia	2 February 2021	18 February 2022	32	10	7	15	31	40	31.25		
Sevada Arzumanyan	Armenia	19 February 2022	13 January 2024	21	5	2	14	21	47	23.81		
Artur Hovhannisyan	Armenia	14 January 2024	30 June 2024	17	4	6	7	16	26	23.53		
Vahe Gevorgyan	Armenia	1 July 2024	30 June 2025	36	20	7	9	69	40	55.56		
Edgar Torosyan	Armenia	1 July 2025	27 October 2025	11	3	2	6	9	16	27.27		
Artur Asoyan	Armenia	28 October 2025		8	3	2	3	11	16	37.50		

== See also ==
- Football in Armenia
- Football Federation of Armenia
