= List of Armenian football transfers summer 2025 =

This is a list of Armenian football transfers in the summer transfer window, by club. Only clubs of the 2025–26 Armenian Premier League are included.

== Armenian Premier League 2025-26 ==
=== Alashkert ===
In: Note: Flags indicate national team as defined under FIFA eligibility rules; some limited exceptions apply. Players may hold more than one non-FIFA nationality.

| No. | Pos. | Nation | Player |
|---|---|---|---|
| 6 | DF | ARM | Edgar Piloyan (from (Bulgaria) Botev Plovdiv) |
| 16 | FW | NGR | Isah Yahaya Buhari (from (Russia) FDC Vista) |
| 18 | MF | NGR | Ifeanyi David Nduka (from (Russia) Krasnodar) |
| 20 | FW | NGR | Obi Chima (from (Russia) FDC Vista) |
| 25 | FW | BRA | Caio Henrique (on loan from (Brazil) Audax) |
| 26 | MF | GHA | Kofi Duffour (from (Russia) FDC Vista) |
| 77 | MF | VEN | Juan Campos (from (Venezuela) Nueva Esparta) |
| 99 | GK | SLE | Ibrahim Sesay (from (Sierra Leone) Bo Rangers) |

Out: Note: Flags indicate national team as defined under FIFA eligibility rules; some limited exceptions apply. Players may hold more than one non-FIFA nationality.

| No. | Pos. | Nation | Player |
|---|---|---|---|
| 3 | DF | ARM | Artur Kartashyan (to Ararat Yerevan, previously on loan to West Armenia) |
| 4 | DF | ARM | Armen Manucharyan (to (Armenia) Lernayin Artsakh) |
| 5 | MF | ARM | Rumyan Hovsepyan (to (Armenia) Lernayin Artsakh) |
| 7 | MF | ARM | Robert Potinyan (to (Armenia) Sardarapat) |
| 9 | MF | ARM | Benik Hovhannisyan (to (Armenia) Van) |
| 10 | FW | ARM | Gevorg Tarakhchyan (to (Armenia) Pyunik) |
| 11 | FW | BIH | Aleksandar Glišić |
| 15 | DF | ARM | Arman Khachatryan (to (Armenia) Gandzasar Kapan) |
| 16 | DF | ARM | Arsen Galstyan (to (Armenia) Van) |
| 19 | DF | FRA | Hayk Musakhanyan (to (Belarus) BATE Borisov) |
| 20 | MF | ARM | Narek Manukyan (to (Armenia) Van) |
| 21 | DF | ARM | Arman Ghazaryan (loan return to (Armenia) Urartu) |
| 22 | GK | ARM | Gor Manukyan (to (Armenia) Van) |
| 23 | MF | ARM | Petros Avetisyan (to (Armenia) Gandzasar Kapan) |
| 27 | DF | CIV | Julien Bationo (to (Slovakia) DAC 1904) |
| 27 | MF | GHA | Annan Mensah (to (Armenia) Gandzasar Kapan) |
| 33 | DF | ARM | Robert Navoyan |
| 55 | FW | ARM | Sargis Metoyan (to (Armenia) Pyunik) |
| 70 | MF | NGR | Haggai Katoh |
| 71 | GK | ITA | Valerio Vimercati |
| 77 | FW | GRE | Christos Kountouriotis (to (Greece) Kavala) |
| 88 | FW | ARM | Armen Hovhannisyan (to (Armenia) Syunik) |
| 95 | FW | RUS | Pavel Kireyenko (to (Russia) Sokol Saratov) |
| — | MF | ARM | Michael Ayvazyan |

=== Ararat-Armenia ===
In: Note: Flags indicate national team as defined under FIFA eligibility rules; some limited exceptions apply. Players may hold more than one non-FIFA nationality.

| No. | Pos. | Nation | Player |
|---|---|---|---|
| 1 | GK | ARM | Arman Nersesyan (loan return from (Armenia) BKMA Yerevan) |
| 2 | DF | POR | Hugo Oliveira (from (Portugal) Vizela) |
| 8 | MF | COL | Juan Balanta (from (Portugal) SCU Torreense) |
| 9 | FW | ARM | Arayik Eloyan (loan return from (Armenia) BKMA Yerevan) |
| 22 | FW | ARM | Misak Hakobyan (loan return from (Albania) Egnatia Rrogozhinë) |
| 24 | GK | POR | Bruno Pinto (from (Portugal) Felgueiras) |
| 30 | FW | POR | Rodrigo Ramos (from (Portugal) Estoril Praia) |
| 47 | DF | GRE | Alexandros Malis (from (Greece) AEK Athens B) |
| 88 | MF | BRA | Welton (from (Portugal) Berço) |
| 90 | FW | GHA | Paul Ayongo (from (Portugal) Chaves) |
| 99 | FW | BRA | João Lima (from (Portugal) Santa Clara) |
| — | FW | ARM | Artur Serobyan (loan return from (Moldova) Sheriff Tiraspol) |

Out: Note: Flags indicate national team as defined under FIFA eligibility rules; some limited exceptions apply. Players may hold more than one non-FIFA nationality.

| No. | Pos. | Nation | Player |
|---|---|---|---|
| 1 | GK | ARM | Rafael Manasyan (to (Lithuania) Nevėžis) |
| 8 | MF | ARM | Hovhannes Harutyunyan (loan return to (Russia) Sochi) |
| 12 | MF | KEN | Amos Nondi (to (Albania) Partizani Tirana) |
| 15 | FW | NGR | Tenton Yenne (to (Russia) Baltika Kaliningrad) |
| 25 | DF | BLR | Aleksandr Pavlovets (to (Belarus) Dynamo Brest) |
| 31 | GK | UKR | Danylo Kucher (to (Ukraine) Concordia Chiajna) |
| 33 | FW | GHA | Eric Ocansey (to (Armenia) Pyunik) |
| 34 | DF | BRA | Romércio (to (Brazil) Inter de Limeira) |
| 45 | FW | CMR | Marius Noubissi (to (Armenia) Pyunik) |
| 96 | GK | ARM | Henri Avagyan (to (Armenia) Pyunik) |
| — | FW | ARM | Misak Hakobyan (on loan to (Albania) Egnatia Rrogozhinë) |
| — | MF | ARM | Aleks Galstyan (to (Armenia) Van) |

=== Ararat Yerevan ===
In: Note: Flags indicate national team as defined under FIFA eligibility rules; some limited exceptions apply. Players may hold more than one non-FIFA nationality.

| No. | Pos. | Nation | Player |
|---|---|---|---|
| 1 | DF | COM | Adel Anzimati-Aboudou (from (France) Martigues) |
| 2 | DF | ARM | Arman Hovhannisyan (from (Armenia) Pyunik) |
| 5 | DF | ARM | Artur Kartashyan (from (Armenia) Alashkert) |
| 7 | FW | CMR | Patrick Victoire Handzongo (from (Cameroon) Colombe Sportive du Dja) |
| 8 | MF | MLI | Abdoul Karim Djire (from (Mali) JMG Academy) |
| 10 | MF | ARM | Artur Grigoryan (from (Armenia) Pyunik) |
| 11 | FW | CIV | Yaya Sogodogo (from (Ivory Coast) Zoman) |
| 14 | MF | BEL | Zakaria Maknoun (from (Saudi Arabia) Al-Washm) |
| 20 | FW | CIV | Adama Meite (from (Ivory Coast) JMG Djekanou Academy) |
| 21 | MF | ARM | Tigran Sargsyan (from West Armenia) |
| 24 | DF | CMR | Hadji Issa Moustapha (loan return from (Belgium) Beveren) |
| 25 | MF | CIV | Aboubacar Ouattara (from (Ivory Coast) Leader Foot Academie) |
| 42 | MF | CIV | Mohamed Lamin Fofana (from (Ivory Coast) Zoman) |
| 55 | DF | SEN | Guy Felix Lima (from (Senegal) United Académie) |

Out: Note: Flags indicate national team as defined under FIFA eligibility rules; some limited exceptions apply. Players may hold more than one non-FIFA nationality.

| No. | Pos. | Nation | Player |
|---|---|---|---|
| 5 | MF | TUN | Rayane Mzoughi |
| 8 | MF | NGR | Christopher Boniface (to (Qatar) Al Kharaitiyat) |
| 11 | MF | ARM | Armen Nahapetyan (to (Armenia) Hayk) |
| 14 | FW | MLI | Badem Diabira |
| 21 | MF | ARM | Serob Galstyan (to (Armenia) Pyunik) |
| 23 | MF | ARM | Gor Malakyan (Retired) |
| 39 | FW | CIV | Keasse Paul Henri Bah (to (Switzerland) Stade Lausanne Ouchy) |
| 63 | DF | SUI | Marc Tsoungui |
| 82 | GK | BRA | Tiago Gomes (to (Kosovo) Drenica) |
| 92 | DF | FRA | Marvin Evouna |

=== BKMA Yerevan ===
In: Note: Flags indicate national team as defined under FIFA eligibility rules; some limited exceptions apply. Players may hold more than one non-FIFA nationality.

| No. | Pos. | Nation | Player |
|---|---|---|---|
| — | DF | ARM | Sergey Harutyunyan (on loan from (Armenia) Pyunik) |
| — | DF | ARM | Karen Hovakimyan (on loan from (Armenia) Pyunik) |
| — | FW | ARM | Grenik Petrosyan (from (Armenia) Noah) |

Out: Note: Flags indicate national team as defined under FIFA eligibility rules; some limited exceptions apply. Players may hold more than one non-FIFA nationality.

| No. | Pos. | Nation | Player |
|---|---|---|---|
| 1 | GK | ARM | Arman Nersesyan (loan return to Ararat-Armenia) |
| 9 | FW | ARM | Arayik Eloyan (loan return to Ararat-Armenia) |
| 10 | MF | ARM | Daniyel Agbalyan (to (Armenia) Pyunik) |
| 11 | FW | ARM | Edik Vardanyan (loan return to (Armenia) Urartu) |
| 17 | MF | ARM | Aram Khamoyan (to (Armenia) Noah) |
| 22 | MF | ARM | Mher Tarloyan (loan return to (Armenia) Shirak) |
| 24 | MF | ARM | Karlen Hovhannisyan (loan return to (Armenia) Pyunik) |

=== Gandzasar Kapan ===
In: Note: Flags indicate national team as defined under FIFA eligibility rules; some limited exceptions apply. Players may hold more than one non-FIFA nationality.

| No. | Pos. | Nation | Player |
|---|---|---|---|
| 2 | DF | ARM | Petros Manukyan (from (Armenia) Noah) |
| 4 | DF | ARM | Taron Voskanyan (from (Armenia) Pyunik) |
| 9 | MF | ARM | Patvakan Avetisyan (from (Armenia) Syunik) |
| 10 | FW | ARM | Levon Petrosyan (on loan from (Armenia) Pyunik) |
| 11 | MF | ARM | Narek Alaverdyan (on loan from Ararat-Armenia) |
| 15 | DF | GHA | Annan Mensah (from (Armenia) Alashkert) |
| 22 | DF | BLR | Yevgeniy Guletskiy |
| 31 | GK | RUS | Nikita Lobusov |
| 77 | DF | ARM | Arman Khachatryan (from (Armenia) Alashkert) |
| 80 | FW | ARM | Martin Grigoryan (from West Armenia) |
| 96 | MF | ARM | Petros Avetisyan (from (Armenia) Alashkert) |

Out: Note: Flags indicate national team as defined under FIFA eligibility rules; some limited exceptions apply. Players may hold more than one non-FIFA nationality.

| No. | Pos. | Nation | Player |
|---|---|---|---|
| 1 | GK | ARM | Harutyun Melkonyan |
| 4 | DF | ARM | Vahe Muradyan (to (Armenia) Van) |
| 8 | MF | ARM | Sargis Shahinyan |
| 9 | MF | ARM | Karen Davtyan (loan return to (Armenia) Urartu) |
| 10 | MF | ARM | Alen Tatintsyan |
| 11 | MF | ARM | Erik Soghomonyan (to (Armenia) Syunik) |
| 12 | MF | NGR | Michael Ndidi (to (Armenia) Bentonit) |
| 15 | DF | USA | Amin Mizyed |
| 17 | MF | ARM | Artak Yedigaryan (Retired) |
| 19 | MF | ARM | Gevorg Matevosyan |
| 22 | GK | ARM | Tigran Vopanyan |
| 23 | MF | ENG | Abiodun Adeyemi |
| 26 | DF | SEN | Ousmane Faye |
| 28 | MF | ARM | Armen Kirakosyan (to (Armenia) Bentonit) |
| 29 | DF | ARM | Suren Zakaryan |
| 30 | FW | ARM | Ashot Kocharyan (to (Armenia) Hayk) |
| 31 | FW | NGR | Auwal Adamu Mohammed |
| 88 | MF | ARM | Davit Barseghyan (loan return to Ararat-Armenia) |
| — | FW | GHA | Edwin Gyasi |

=== Noah ===
In: Note: Flags indicate national team as defined under FIFA eligibility rules; some limited exceptions apply. Players may hold more than one non-FIFA nationality.

| No. | Pos. | Nation | Player |
|---|---|---|---|
| 6 | DF | GHA | Eric Boakye (from (Cyprus) Aris Limassol) |
| 14 | MF | JPN | Takuto Oshima (from (Romania) Universitatea Craiova) |
| 16 | GK | COD | Timothy Fayulu (on loan from (Switzerland) Sion) |
| 23 | MF | ARM | Aram Khamoyan (from (Armenia) BKMA Yerevan) |
| 32 | FW | BIH | Nardin Mulahusejnović (from (Bosnia and Herzegovina) Zrinjski Mostar) |
| 33 | DF | POR | David Sualehe (from (Slovenia) Olimpija Ljubljana) |
| 39 | DF | GLP | Nathanaël Saintini (from (Switzerland) Sion) |
| 47 | FW | CRO | Marin Jakoliš (from (Australia) Macarthur FC) |
| 57 | FW | ARM | Albert Gareginyan (from (Armenia) Shirak) |
| 77 | DF | CRO | Alen Grgić (from (Croatia) Slaven Belupo) |
| 99 | MF | ARM | Hovhannes Harutyunyan (from (Russia) Sochi) |

Out: Note: Flags indicate national team as defined under FIFA eligibility rules; some limited exceptions apply. Players may hold more than one non-FIFA nationality.

| No. | Pos. | Nation | Player |
|---|---|---|---|
| 5 | DF | BRA | James Santos (to (Armenia) Van) |
| 6 | DF | BRA | Marcos Pedro |
| 11 | FW | ALB | Eraldo Çinari |
| 14 | DF | ARG | Bryan Mendoza |
| 20 | MF | SVK | Martin Gamboš (to (Slovakia) Komárno) |
| 21 | MF | POR | Bruno Almeida (loan return to (Portugal) Santa Clara) |
| 26 | DF | SRB | Aleksandar Miljković (to (Armenia) Pyunik) |
| 30 | FW | ARM | Grenik Petrosyan (to (Armenia) BKMA Yerevan) |

=== Pyunik ===
In: Note: Flags indicate national team as defined under FIFA eligibility rules; some limited exceptions apply. Players may hold more than one non-FIFA nationality.

| No. | Pos. | Nation | Player |
|---|---|---|---|
| 3 | DF | GRE | Nikos Kenourgios (from (Greece) Athens Kallithea) |
| 8 | FW | ARM | Gevorg Tarakhchyan (from (Armenia) Alashkert) |
| 10 | MF | ESP | Javi Moreno (from (Spain) Hércules) |
| 13 | MF | ARM | Daniyel Agbalyan (from (Armenia) BKMA Yerevan) |
| 16 | GK | ARM | Henri Avagyan (from Ararat-Armenia) |
| 18 | MF | ARM | Karlen Hovhannisyan (loan return from (Armenia) BKMA Yerevan) |
| 19 | FW | ARM | Sargis Metoyan (from (Armenia) Alashkert) |
| 21 | MF | ARM | Serob Galstyan (from (Armenia) Ararat Yerevan) |
| 22 | MF | SRB | Sead Islamović (from (Serbia) Novi Pazar) |
| 26 | DF | SRB | Aleksandar Miljković (from (Armenia) Noah) |
| 30 | GK | RUS | Daniil Polyanski (from (Belarus) Arsenal Dzerzhinsk) |
| 33 | FW | GHA | Eric Ocansey (from Ararat-Armenia) |
| 76 | DF | POR | Filipe Almeida (from (Portugal) Feirense) |
| 99 | FW | CMR | Marius Noubissi (from Ararat-Armenia) |

Out: Note: Flags indicate national team as defined under FIFA eligibility rules; some limited exceptions apply. Players may hold more than one non-FIFA nationality.

| No. | Pos. | Nation | Player |
|---|---|---|---|
| 3 | DF | ARM | Arman Hovhannisyan (to (Armenia) Ararat Yerevan) |
| 4 | MF | ARM | Solomon Udo (to (Saudi Arabia) Al-Arabi) |
| 5 | DF | ARM | Varazdat Haroyan (to (Hungary) Kazincbarcikai) |
| 6 | DF | BRA | Juninho |
| 8 | FW | CIV | Serges Déblé (to (France) USSA Vertou) |
| 10 | MF | ARM | Artur Grigoryan (to (Armenia) Ararat Yerevan) |
| 14 | FW | NGR | Yusuf Otubanjo (to (Uzbekistan) Nasaf) |
| 21 | FW | BRA | Agdon Menezes |
| 24 | MF | GBS | Mimito Biai (to (Portugal) Lusitânia) |
| 32 | GK | ARM | Sergey Mikaelyan |
| 33 | DF | ARM | Taron Voskanyan (to (Armenia) Gandzasar Kapan) |
| 66 | MF | POR | Martim Maia (to (Greece) Ethnikos Achna) |
| 92 | MF | HAI | Bryan Alceus |
| 95 | DF | UKR | Anton Bratkov (to (Armenia) Urartu) |
| 97 | MF | ARM | David Davidyan (to (Russia) Rotor Volgograd) |
| 98 | GK | RUS | Nikita Alekseyev (loan return to (Russia) Ural Yekaterinburg) |
| 99 | FW | RUS | Temur Dzhikiya (to (Russia) Amkal Moscow) |
| — | GK | ARM | Hunan Gyurjinyan (to (Armenia) Van) |
| — | DF | ARM | Ishkhan Darbinyan (on loan to (Armenia) Sardarapat) |
| — | DF | ARM | Sergey Harutyunyan (on loan to (Armenia) BKMA Yerevan) |
| — | DF | ARM | Karen Hovakimyan (on loan to (Armenia) BKMA Yerevan) |
| — | MF | ARM | Hamlet Aleksanyan (on loan to (Armenia) Shirak) |
| — | FW | ARM | Narek Baroyan |
| — | FW | ARM | Levon Petrosyan (on loan to (Armenia) Gandzasar Kapan) |

=== Shirak ===
In: Note: Flags indicate national team as defined under FIFA eligibility rules; some limited exceptions apply. Players may hold more than one non-FIFA nationality.

| No. | Pos. | Nation | Player |
|---|---|---|---|
| 22 | MF | ARM | Mher Tarloyan (loan return from (Armenia) BKMA Yerevan) |
| 28 | FW | NGR | Jesse Akila (from (Armenia) Van) |
| — | MF | ARM | Hamlet Aleksanyan (on loan from (Armenia) Pyunik) |

Out: Note: Flags indicate national team as defined under FIFA eligibility rules; some limited exceptions apply. Players may hold more than one non-FIFA nationality.

| No. | Pos. | Nation | Player |
|---|---|---|---|
| 1 | GK | SRB | Darko Vukašinović |
| 5 | DF | ARM | Hrayr Mkoyan (to (Armenia) Van) |
| 15 | FW | CIV | Aly Namory Coulibaly |
| 19 | MF | CIV | Junior Magico Traore (to (Israel) Hapoel Rishon LeZion) |
| 57 | FW | ARM | Albert Gareginyan (to (Armenia) Noah) |
| 77 | FW | CIV | Mory Kone |
| 97 | FW | CIV | Cedric Doh |

=== Urartu ===
In: Note: Flags indicate national team as defined under FIFA eligibility rules; some limited exceptions apply. Players may hold more than one non-FIFA nationality.

| No. | Pos. | Nation | Player |
|---|---|---|---|
| 4 | DF | ARM | Arman Ghazaryan (loan return from (Armenia) Alashkert) |
| 9 | FW | FRA | Alexandre Llovet (from (Andorra) Inter Club d'Escaldes) |
| 11 | DF | NGR | Okezie Ebenezer |
| 18 | DF | UKR | Anton Bratkov (from (Armenia) Pyunik) |
| 21 | FW | ARM | Edik Vardanyan (loan return from (Armenia) BKMA Yerevan) |
| 33 | GK | MNE | Andrija Dragojević (from West Armenia) |
| 44 | DF | UKR | Yevhen Tsymbalyuk (from (Romania) Concordia Chiajna) |

Out: Note: Flags indicate national team as defined under FIFA eligibility rules; some limited exceptions apply. Players may hold more than one non-FIFA nationality.

| No. | Pos. | Nation | Player |
|---|---|---|---|
| 5 | DF | RUS | Aleksandr Putsko (to (Russia) Arsenal Tula) |
| 9 | MF | RUS | Maksim Paliyenko (to (Russia) KDV Tomsk) |
| 11 | FW | RUS | Vladislav Yakovlev (loan return to (Russia) CSKA Moscow) |
| 16 | DF | NGR | Barry Isaac (to (Lithuania) Hegelmann) |
| 42 | GK | RUS | Aleksandr Melikhov (to (Russia) Arsenal Tula) |
| 60 | DF | RUS | Dmitry Tikhy (to (Turkey) Serik Belediyespor) |
| 77 | FW | ARM | Edgar Movsesyan (to (Cyprus) PAC Omonia 29M) |

=== Van ===
In: Note: Flags indicate national team as defined under FIFA eligibility rules; some limited exceptions apply. Players may hold more than one non-FIFA nationality.

| No. | Pos. | Nation | Player |
|---|---|---|---|
| 1 | GK | ARM | Gor Manukyan (from (Armenia) Alashkert) |
| 3 | DF | BRA | Ferreira (from (Brazil) Atlético Goianiense) |
| 4 | DF | GEO | Saba Sidamonidze (from (Georgia (country)) Borjomi) |
| 5 | DF | ARM | Hrayr Mkoyan (from (Armenia) Shirak) |
| 6 | DF | COL | Jefferson Granado (from West Armenia) |
| 8 | MF | ARM | Petros Afajanyan (from (Armenia) Syunik) |
| 10 | MF | ARM | Benik Hovhannisyan (from (Armenia) Alashkert) |
| 14 | MF | BRA | Eriki (from (Brazil) Coimbra) |
| 17 | FW | ARM | Hamlet Minasyan (from (Armenia) Syunik) |
| 18 | FW | BRA | Samuel Reis (from (Brazil) Coimbra) |
| 22 | MF | ARM | Aleks Galstyan (from Ararat-Armenia) |
| 23 | MF | ARM | Albert Mnatsakanyan (from (Georgia (country)) Gonio) |
| 24 | DF | ARM | Arsen Galstyan (from (Armenia) Alashkert) |
| 25 | DF | UKR | Hlib Bukhal (from (Poland) Resovia) |
| 28 | FW | COL | Hollman McCormick (from (Portugal) Torreense) |
| 29 | MF | ARM | Harutyun Asatryan (from (Armenia) Mika) |
| 33 | FW | BRA | Allef |
| 45 | GK | RUS | Danila Bokov (from (Russia) CSKA Moscow) |
| 59 | GK | ARM | Hunan Gyurjinyan (from (Armenia) Pyunik) |
| 69 | MF | UKR | Denys Dedechko (from (Romania) Câmpulung Muscel) |
| 70 | MF | ARM | Narek Manukyan (from (Armenia) Alashkert) |
| 77 | FW | BRA | Sousa (from (Brazil) Nacional) |
| 88 | DF | BRA | James Santos (from (Armenia) Noah) |

Out: Note: Flags indicate national team as defined under FIFA eligibility rules; some limited exceptions apply. Players may hold more than one non-FIFA nationality.

| No. | Pos. | Nation | Player |
|---|---|---|---|
| 9 | FW | NGR | Jesse Akila (to (Armenia) Shirak) |
