= 2025–26 FC Pyunik season =

Pyunik
2025-26 season
- Chairman: Rafik Hayrapetyan
- Manager: Yegishe Melikyan (until 6 August); Artak Oseyan (from 12 August)
- Stadium: Vahagn Tumasyan Stadium; Academy Stadium
- Premier League: 3rd
- Armenian Cup: Quarter-final vs Noah
- UEFA Conference League: Second qualifying round vs Győri
- Top goalscorer: League: Marius Noubissi (7); Momo Yansané (7); All: Marius Noubissi (10)
Home colours	Away colours

The 2025–26 season was FC Pyunik's 32nd season in Armenian Premier League.

== Season overview ==
On 9 June, Pyunik announced the signing of Gevorg Tarakhchyan from Alashkert.

On 10 June, Pyunik announced the signing of Sead Islamović from Novi Pazar.

On 11 June, Pyunik announced the signing of Serob Galstyan from Ararat Yerevan.

On 12 June, Pyunik announced the signing of Sargis Metoyan from Alashkert.

On 15 June, Pyunik announced the signing of Filipe Almeida from Feirense.

On 17 June, Pyunik announced the return of Aleksandar Miljković after he'd left Noah.

On 20 June, Pyunik announced the signing of Daniil Polyansky from Arsenal Dzerzhinsk.

On 23 June, Pyunik announced the signing of Daniyel Agbalyan from BKMA Yerevan.

On 26 June, Pyunik announced the signing of Javi Moreno from Hércules.

On 2 July, Pyunik announced the signing of Marius Noubissi after he'd left Ararat-Armenia.

On 4 July, Pyunik announced the signing of Henri Avagyan from Ararat-Armenia.

On 6 July, Pyunik announced the signing of Nikos Kenourgios from Athens Kallithea.

On 15 July, Pyunik announced the signing of Eric Ocansey after he'd left Ararat-Armenia.

On 6 August, Pyunik announced the departure of head coach Yegishe Melikyan.

On 8 August, Pyunik announced that Solomon Udo had left the club.

On 12 August, Pyunik announced the appointment of Artak Oseyan as their new head coach.

On 14 December, Pyunik announced the departure of Serob Galstyan and Daniil Polyansky, whilst Vagner Gonçalves left the club the following day.

On 13 January, Pyunik announced the signing of Artak Dashyan following his release from Noah

On 13 January, Pyunik announced the signing of James Santos following his release from Van

On 16 January, Pyunik announced that they had extended their contract with Henri Avagyan until 2029.

On 21 January, Pyunik announced the signing of Robert Darbinyan following his release from Shirak.

On 26 January, Pyunik announced the signing of Momo Yansané from Omonia Aradippou.

On 24 February, Pyunik announced the signing of Gonçalo Miguel on loan for the remainder of the season from Ural Yekaterinburg.

On 25 February, Pyunik announced that they would play the home matches at the Academy Stadium in Yerevan for the remainder of the season.

On 28 February, Pyunik announced that Aris Karapetyan had joined Van on loan for the remainder of the season.

On 20 March, Pyunik announced that Matas Vareika had left the club to join Žalgiris on loan for the remainder of the year.

== Squad ==
As of match played 27 May 2026

Number	Name	Nationality	Position	Date of birth (age)	Signed from	Signed in	Contract ends	Apps.	Goals
Goalkeepers
16	Henri Avagyan	(Armenia)	GK	16 January 1996 (aged 30)	Ararat-Armenia	2025	2029	61	0
71	Stanislav Buchnev	(Armenia)	GK	17 July 1990 (aged 35)	Fakel Voronezh	2020		127	0
Defenders
2	Alemão	(Brazil)	DF	7 December 1992 (aged 33)	Unattached	2024		58	2
3	Nikos Kenourgios	(Greece)	DF	8 September 1998 (aged 27)	Athens Kallithea	2025		17	0
5	James Santos	(Brazil)	DF	15 July 1995 (aged 30)	Unattached	2026		85	9
15	Mikhail Kovalenko	(Russia)	DF	25 January 1995 (aged 31)	Olimp-Dolgoprudny	2022		137	10
26	Aleksandar Miljković	(Serbia)	DF	8 September 1998 (aged 27)	Unattached	2025		60	4
76	Filipe Almeida	(Portugal)	DF	5 July 1997 (aged 28)	Feirense	2025		31	1
77	Gonçalo Miguel	(Portugal)	DF	6 May 2003 (aged 23)	on loan from Ural Yekaterinburg	2026	2026	0	0
79	Serhiy Vakulenko	(Ukraine)	DF	7 September 1993 (aged 32)	Ararat-Armenia	2022		90	2
88	Robert Darbinyan	(Armenia)	DF	4 October 1995 (aged 30)	Unattached	2026		8	0
Midfielders
7	Edgar Malakyan	(Armenia)	MF	22 September 1990 (aged 35)	Unattached	2023			
10	Javi Moreno	(Spain)	MF	20 June 1997 (aged 28)	Hércules	2025		33	6
11	Artak Dashyan	(Armenia)	MF	20 November 1989 (aged 36)	Unattached	2026		107	15
13	Daniyel Agbalyan	(Armenia)	MF	12 March 1999 (aged 27)	BKMA Yerevan	2025		18	0
17	Vyacheslav Afyan	(Armenia)	MF	28 October 2005 (aged 20)	Academy	2022		6	0
18	Karlen Hovhannisyan	(Armenia)	MF	26 April 2005 (aged 21)	Academy	2023		29	1
20	Lucas Villela	(Brazil)	MF	24 March 1994 (aged 32)	Unattached	2023		75	7
22	Sead Islamović	(Armenia)	MF	24 September 1999 (aged 26)	Novi Pazar	2025		27	0
25	Daniil Kulikov	(Russia)	MF	24 June 1998 (aged 27)	Dinamo Minsk	2025		46	6
35	Petros Alekyan	(Armenia)	MF	25 December 2005 (aged 20)	Academy	2024		2	1
41	Zhirayr Ashikyan	(Armenia)	MF	7 November 2008 (aged 17)	Academy	2024		1	0
Forwards
8	Gevorg Tarakhchyan	(Armenia)	FW	15 March 2002 (aged 24)	Alashkert	2025		29	3
19	Sargis Metoyan	(Armenia)	FW	6 September 1997 (aged 28)	Alashkert	2025		15	0
33	Eric Ocansey	(Ghana)	FW	22 August 1997 (aged 28)	Unattached	2025		25	3
90	Momo Yansané	(Guinea)	FW	29 July 1997 (aged 28)	Omonia Aradippou	2026		15	7
99	Marius Noubissi	(Cameroon)	FW	28 November 1996 (aged 29)	Unattached	2025		31	10
Players away on loan
9	Matas Vareika	(Lithuania)	FW	27 January 2000 (aged 26)	Hegelmann	2025		33	8
	Ishkhan Darbinyan	(Armenia)	DF	10 April 2004 (aged 22)	Academy	2021		1	0
	Hamlet Aleksanyan	(Armenia)	MF	3 September 2006 (aged 19)	Academy	2022		1	0
	Levon Petrosyan	(Armenia)	MF	24 March 2004 (aged 22)	Academy	2020		12	2
	Aris Karapetyan	(Armenia)	FW	24 May 2005 (aged 21)	Academy	2022		0	0
Players who left during the season
4	Solomon Udo	(Armenia)	MF	14 December 1997 (aged 28)	Unattached	2024		47	0
11	Joël Bopesu	(Democratic Republic of the Congo)	DF	25 January 1995 (aged 31)	Žalgiris	2025		14	3
21	Serob Galstyan	(Armenia)	MF	23 September 2002 (aged 23)	Ararat Yerevan	2025		3	0
23	Vagner Gonçalves	(Brazil)	MF	27 April 1996 (aged 30)	Dinamo Tbilisi	2024		59	8
30	Daniil Polyansky	(Russia)	GK	18 February 2001 (aged 25)	Arsenal Dzerzhinsk	2025		0	0
77	Sani Buhari	(Nigeria)	FW	10 January 2004 (aged 22)	Van	2024		30	4

== Transfers ==
=== In ===
Date	Position	Nationality	Name	From	Fee	Ref.
9 June 2025	FW	(Armenia)	Gevorg Tarakhchyan	Alashkert	Undisclosed	
10 June 2025	MF	(Serbia)	Sead Islamović	Novi Pazar	Undisclosed	
11 June 2025	MF	(Armenia)	Serob Galstyan	Ararat Yerevan	Undisclosed	
12 June 2025	FW	(Armenia)	Sargis Metoyan	Alashkert	Undisclosed	
15 June 2025	DF	(Portugal)	Filipe Almeida	Feirense	Undisclosed	
17 June 2025	DF	(Serbia)	Aleksandar Miljković	Unattached	Free	
20 June 2025	GK	(Russia)	Daniil Polyansky	Arsenal Dzerzhinsk	Undisclosed	
23 June 2025	MF	(Armenia)	Daniyel Agbalyan	BKMA Yerevan	Undisclosed	
26 June 2025	MF	(Spain)	Javi Moreno	Hércules	Undisclosed	
2 July 2025	FW	(Cameroon)	Marius Noubissi	Unattached	Free	
4 July 2025	GK	(Armenia)	Henri Avagyan	Ararat-Armenia	Free	
17 June 2025	DF	(Greece)	Nikos Kenourgios	Athens Kallithea	Undisclosed	
15 July 2025	FW	(Ghana)	Eric Ocansey	Unattached	Free	
13 January 2026	MF	(Armenia)	Artak Dashyan	Unattached	Free	
21 January 2026	DF	(Armenia)	Robert Darbinyan	Unattached	Free	
26 January 2026	FW	(Guinea)	Momo Yansané	Omonia Aradippou	Undisclosed	

=== Loans in ===
Date from	Position	Nationality	Name	From	Date to	Ref.
24 February 2026	DF	(Portugal)	Gonçalo Miguel	Ural Yekaterinburg	End of season	

=== Out ===
Date	Position	Nationality	Name	To	Fee	Ref.
29 July 2025	FW	(Nigeria)	Yusuf Otubanjo	Nasaf	Undisclosed	
4 August 2025	GK	(Armenia)	Hunan Gyurjinyan	Van	Undisclosed	
21 January 2026	MF	(Armenia)	Hayk Tatosyan	Van	Undisclosed	

=== Loans out ===
Date from	Position	Nationality	Name	To	Date to	Ref.
26 June 2025	DF	(Armenia)	Sergey Harutyunyan	BKMA Yerevan	End of Season	
26 June 2025	DF	(Armenia)	Karen Hovakimyan	BKMA Yerevan	End of Season	
2 July 2025	DF	(Armenia)	Ishkhan Darbinyan	Sardarapat	End of Season	
23 July 2025	MF	(Armenia)	Hamlet Aleksanyan	Shirak	End of Season	
29 July 2025	FW	(Armenia)	Levon Petrosyan	Gandzasar Kapan	End of Season	
28 February 2026	FW	(Armenia)	Aris Karapetyan	Van	End of Season	
20 March 2026	FW	(Lithuania)	Matas Vareika	Žalgiris	31 December 2026	

=== Released ===
Date	Position	Nationality	Name	Joined	Date	Ref
3 June 2025	DF	(Armenia)	Taron Voskanyan	Gandzasar Kapan		
4 June 2025	DF	(Ukraine)	Anton Bratkov	Urartu	28 June 2025	
4 June 2025	FW	(Brazil)	Agdon Menezes	Crato	23 February 2026	
4 June 2025	FW	(Ivory Coast)	Serges Déblé	USSA Vertou	8 July 2025	
4 June 2025	FW	(Russia)	Temur Dzhikiya	Amkal Moscow		
9 June 2025	MF	(Guinea-Bissau)	Mimito Biai	Lusitânia		
9 June 2025	MF	(Haiti)	Bryan Alceus	Politehnica Iași	22 September 2025	
14 June 2025	DF	(Armenia)	Arman Hovhannisyan	Ararat Yerevan	9 July 2025	
21 June 2025	MF	(Armenia)	David Davidyan	Rotor Volgograd	23 June 2025	
30 June 2025	MF	(Portugal)	Martim Maia	Ethnikos Achna	12 August 2025	
10 July 2025	DF	(Armenia)	Varazdat Haroyan	Kazincbarcikai	10 July 2025	
15 July 2025	GK	(Armenia)	Sergey Mikaelyan	Sardarapat		
16 July 2025	FW	(Armenia)	Narek Baroyan	Ararati Araks		
2 August 2025	DF	(Brazil)	Juninho	Falcon	22 July 2026	
8 August 2025	MF	(Armenia)	Solomon Udo	Al-Arabi	8 August 2025	
14 December 2025	GK	(Russia)	Daniil Polyansky	Asiagoal Bishkek	17 February 2026	
14 December 2025	MF	(Armenia)	Serob Galstyan	Sardarapat	24 January 2026	
15 December 2025	MF	(Brazil)	Vagner Gonçalves	Teuta	6 February 2026	
14 January 2026	DF	(Democratic Republic of the Congo)	Joël Bopesu	Panevėžys	29 January 2026	
10 February 2026	FW	(Nigeria)	Sani Buhari	Real Valladolid Promesas	12 March 2026	

== Friendlies ==
20 January 2026	Pyunik	5–0	United Sport	Al Ain, United Arab Emirates
(UTC+4)	Vareika; Metoyan; Dashyan	Report

23 January 2026	Pyunik	2–3	Ural Yekaterinburg	Al Ain, United Arab Emirates
17:00 (UTC+4)	Almeida; Vareika	Report	Goal

27 January 2026	Riga	1–1	Pyunik	Al Ain, United Arab Emirates
11:00 (UTC+4)		Report	Yansané

27 January 2026	Pyunik	1–0	Al-Ittifaq	Al Ain, United Arab Emirates
19:00 (UTC+4)	Almeida	Report

3 February 2026	Pyunik	1–0	Yunnan Yukun	Al Ain, United Arab Emirates
10:30 (UTC+4)	Villela	Report

3 February 2026	Spartak Moscow	2–0	Pyunik	Al Ain, United Arab Emirates
17:30 (UTC+4)	Goal	Report

11 February 2026	Pyunik	1–1	Qingdao West Coast	Al Ain, United Arab Emirates
11:30 (UTC+4)	Goal	Report	Goal

11 February 2026	Pyunik	0–3	Dinamo Samarqand	Al Ain, United Arab Emirates
16:30 (UTC+4)		Report	Goal

14 February 2026	Lokomotiv Moscow	1–1	Pyunik	Al Ain, United Arab Emirates
(UTC+4)	Goal	Report	Kulikov (pen.)

18 February 2026	Pyunik	2–1	Rodina-2 Moscow	Al Ain, United Arab Emirates
17:00 (UTC+4)	Goal	Report	Goal

== Competitions ==
=== Overview ===
Competition	First match	Last match	Starting round	Final position	Record							
Competition	First match	Last match	Starting round	Final position	Pld	W	D	L	GF	GA	GD	Win %
Premier League	4 August 2025	27 May 2026	Matchday 1	3rd	27	17	4	6	37	18	+19	62.96
Armenian Cup	29 October 2025	1 April 2026	Round of 16	Quarter-final	3	1	1	1	6	4	+2	33.33
UEFA Conference League	10 July 2025	31 July 2025	First qualifying round	Second qualifying round	4	2	0	2	8	5	+3	50.00
Total					34	20	5	9	51	27	+24	58.82

Last updated: 27 May 2026
Source: Competitions

=== Premier League ===
==== Results summary ====
Overall								Home						Away					
Pld	W	D	L	GF	GA	GD	Pts	W	D	L	GF	GA	GD	W	D	L	GF	GA	GD
27	17	4	6	37	18	+19	55	10	1	2	23	8	+15	7	3	4	14	10	+4

Last updated: 27 May 2026.
Source: See Results

==== Results by round ====
Round	1	2	4	5	6	7	8	9	10	11	12	14	3	15	17	18	19	20	21	22	23	24	16	25	26	13	27
Ground	A	A	A	H	A	H	A	H	A	H	A	A	H	H	H	H	A	A	H	A	H	A	A	H	A	H	H
Result	W	D	W	L	L	W	W	W	L	W	W	W	W	W	W	W	W	W	L	L	W	D	L	W	W	D	W
Position	2	2	1	4	5	5	5	5	5	5	4	4	4	3	2	2	1	1	3	5	3	3	4	3	3	3	3

Updated to match(es) played on 27 May 2026. Source: See Results
A = Away; H = Home; W = Win; D = Draw; L = Loss; P = Bye

==== Results ====
4 August 2025 1	Alashkert	1–2	Pyunik	Abovyan
17:30 (UTC+4)	Bationo (yellow card) 35' (goal) 41'; Sadoyan (yellow card) 56'	Report	Bationo 46' (o.g.); Ocansey (yellow card) 58'; Kulikov 78'	Stadium: Vahagn Tumasyan Stadium; Referee: Zaven Hovhannisyan

11 August 2025 2	Shirak	0–0	Pyunik	Gyumri
20:00 (UTC+4)	R.Darbinyan (yellow card) 75'; Ghumashyan (yellow card) 76'	Report		Stadium: City Stadium; Referee: Henrik Nalbandian

22 August 2025 4	Ararat Yerevan	0–2	Pyunik	Yerevan
18:00 (UTC+4)	Meite (yellow card) 30'	Report	Moreno (yellow card) 44'; Ocansey 51'; Hovhannisyan (yellow card) 65'; Miljković (yellow card) 71'; Gonçalves 90+5'	Stadium: Republican Stadium; Referee: Ashot Harutyunyan

29 August 2025 5	Pyunik	1–2	Urartu	Abovyan
19:00 (UTC+4)	Agbalyan (yellow card) 14'; Miljković (yellow card) 57'; Moreno 58'	Report	Polyakov 3' (yellow card) 41'; Aghasaryan (yellow card) 47'; Mkrtchyan (yellow card) 80'; Gunko 90+2'	Stadium: Vahagn Tumasyan Stadium; Referee: Artem Gasparyan

14 September 2025 6	Noah	3–1	Pyunik	Abovyan
19:00 (UTC+4)	Jakoliš 3'; Čančarević (yellow card) 41'; Ferreira 65'; Oshima (yellow card) 69'; Agbalyan 78' (o.g.)	Report	Islamović (yellow card) 36'; Malakyan (yellow card) 39'; Miljković (yellow card) 46'; Tarakhchyan 62'; Almeida (yellow card) 75'	Stadium: Vahagn Tumasyan Stadium; Referee: Artak Vardanyan

20 September 2025 7	Pyunik	2–1	BKMA Yerevan	Abovyan
18:00 (UTC+4)	Kulikov 8'; Miljković 26'; Metoyan (yellow card) 88'	Report	Askaryan 64'; Petrosyan (yellow card) 87'	Stadium: Vahagn Tumasyan Stadium; Referee: Zaven Hovhannisyan

27 September 2025 8	Gandzasar Kapan	0–1	Pyunik	Yerevan
19:00 (UTC+4)	Emmanuel (yellow card) 61'; Voskanyan (yellow card) 64'; Hayrapetyan (yellow card) 88'	Report	Ocansey (yellow card) 56'; Kovalenko (yellow card) 60'; Kulikov 63'; Malakyan (yellow card) 90'	Stadium: Junior Stadium; Referee: Artak Vardanyan

4 October 2025 9	Pyunik	5–1	Van	Abovyan
17:00 (UTC+4)	Noubissi 27', 41', 79'; Tarakhchyan 39', 48'; Almeida (yellow card) 73'	Report	Afajanyan 90' (pen.)	Stadium: Vahagn Tumasyan Stadium; Referee: Yura Mahtesyan

18 October 2025 10	Van	2–1	Pyunik	Charentsavan
15:30 (UTC+4)	Kirakosyan (yellow card) 32'; Afajanyan 45+1' (pen.); Eriki 85'	Report	Miljković (yellow card) 41' (yellow-red card) 82'; Agbalyan (yellow card) 43'; Moreno (yellow card) 50'; Noubissi 90+4'; Vakulenko (yellow card) 90+6'	Stadium: City Stadium; Referee: Vardan Manukyan

25 October 2025 11	Pyunik	2–0	Gandzasar Kapan	Abovyan
17:00 (UTC+4)	Almeida (yellow card) 7'; Alemão 31'; Ocansey (yellow card) 58'; Kulikov (yellow card) 68'; Kovalenko 87'	Report	Mani (yellow card) 38'; Obonde (yellow card) 50'; Grigoryan (yellow card) 68'	Stadium: Vahagn Tumasyan Stadium; Referee: Hovhannes Kalantaryan

2 November 2025 12	BKMA Yerevan	1–2	Pyunik	Yerevan
17:00 (UTC+4)	Askaryan 57'; Arakelyan (yellow card) 79'	Report	Ocansey 12'; Agbalyan (yellow card) 18'; Vakulenko (yellow card) 46'; Moreno 65' (pen.); Kovalenko (yellow card) 89'	Stadium: Yerevan Football Academy Stadium; Referee: Vardan Manukyan

21 November 2025 14	Urartu	1–1	Pyunik	Yerevan
19:00 (UTC+4)	Polyakov (yellow card) 13'; Santos (yellow card) 36'; Michel 45'; Kaloukian (yellow card) 63' (red card) 67'; Mishiyev (yellow card) 89'; Ghazaryan (yellow card) 90+4'	Report	Agbalyan (yellow card) 36'; Noubissi (yellow card) 53'; Miljković (yellow card) 57'; Hovhannisyan (yellow card) 90+2'; Vakulenko 90+5'	Stadium: Urartu Stadium; Referee: Ashot Harutyunyan

25 November 2025 3	Pyunik	1–0	Ararat-Armenia	Abovyan
18:00 (UTC+4)	Moreno 18'; Almeida (yellow card) 27'; Avagyan (yellow card) 78'; Kenourgios (yellow card) 80'; Kulikov (yellow card) 90'	Report	Malis (yellow card) 30'; Muradyan (yellow card) 45+3'; Queirós (yellow card) 45+4'	Stadium: Vahagn Tumasyan Stadium; Referee: Ashot Ghaltakhchyan
Note: Match originally scheduled to be played on 17 August at the Vahagn Tumasyan Sports Complex in Abovyan, but postponed on 12 August to accommodate Noah playing Gandzasar Kapan at the same stadium.

30 November 2025 15	Pyunik	2–0	Ararat Yerevan	Abovyan
19:00 (UTC+4)	Kulikov (yellow card) 28'; Kovalenko (yellow card) 52'; Noubissi 66', 90+3'	Report	Doumbia (yellow card) 55'	Stadium: Vahagn Tumasyan Stadium; Referee: Zaven Hovhannisyan

9 March 2026 17	Pyunik	3–0	Shirak	Yerevan
15:00 (UTC+4)	Yansané 7', 39'; Malakyan 63'; Afyan (yellow card) 90+2'	Report	Janoyan (yellow card) 43'; L.Darbinyan (yellow card) 49'; Pahlevanyan (yellow card) 81'	Stadium: Yerevan Football Academy Stadium; Referee: Ashot Ghaltakhchyan

15 March 2026 18	Pyunik	1–0	Alashkert	Yerevan
15:30 (UTC+4)	Yansané 20'; Islamović (yellow card) 24'; Avagyan (yellow card) 90+2'	Report	Macedo (yellow card) 85'; Kirakosyan (yellow card) 90+3'	Stadium: Yerevan Football Academy Stadium; Referee: Artem Gasparyan

21 March 2026 19	Alashkert	0–1	Pyunik	Armavir
15:30 (UTC+4)	Granado (yellow card) 52'; Terteryan (yellow card) 63'; Sammani (yellow card) 90+1'; Matyukhin (yellow card) 90+7'	Report	Yansané 43'; Kovalenko (yellow card) 45+3'; Alemão (yellow card) 76'; Villela (yellow card) 90+3'	Stadium: Hakob Tonoyan Stadium; Referee: Ashot Ghaltakhchyan

6 April 2026 20	Shirak	0–1	Pyunik	Gyumri
17:00 (UTC+4)	Tarloyan (yellow card) 47'; Karapetyan (yellow card) 74'; L.Darbinyan (yellow card) 81'	Report	Ocansey (yellow card) 40'; Villela 75'; R.Darbinyan (yellow card) 90+2'	Stadium: City Stadium; Referee: Zaven Hovhannisyan

11 April 2026 21	Pyunik	0–2	Ararat-Armenia	Yerevan
17:30 (UTC+4)	Yansané (yellow card) 90+5'; Santos (yellow card) 90+6'	Report	Balanta 24' (pen.); Hovhannisyan (yellow card) 74'; Pinto (yellow card) 82'; Muradyan (yellow card) 86'; Oliveira (yellow card) 90' (goal) 90+2'; Ndour (yellow card) 90+6'	Stadium: Academy Stadium; Referee: Artem Gasparyan

18 April 2026 22	Ararat Yerevan	1–0	Pyunik	Yerevan
18:00 (UTC+4)	Fofana (yellow card) 26'; Berte (yellow card) 41'; Anzimati (yellow card) 86'; Doumbia 90+4' (yellow card) 90+5'; Obinna (yellow card) 90+5'	Report	Hovhannisyan (yellow card) 6'; Santos (yellow card) 15'; Islamović (yellow card) 54'; Avagyan (yellow card) 67'; Noubissi (yellow card) 90+7'; Kulikov (yellow card) 90+8'	Stadium: Republican Stadium; Referee: Vardan Vardumyan

23 April 2026 23	Pyunik	2–1	Urartu	Yerevan
18:00 (UTC+4)	Yansané 4'; Islamović (yellow card) 11'; Vakulenko 64'	Report	Velosa (yellow card) 33'; Melkonyan (yellow card) 41'; Kaloukian 90+2' (pen.)	Stadium: Academy Stadium; Referee: Artem Gasparyan

3 May 2026 24	Noah	0–0	Pyunik	Abovyan
16:00 (UTC+4)	Khamoyan (yellow card) 40'; Hambardzumyan (yellow card) 60'; Ferreira (yellow card) 85'; Zolotić (yellow card) 90+10'	Report	Yansané (yellow card) 45+1'; Dashyan (yellow card) 70'; Kovalenko (yellow card) 82'; Almeida (yellow card) 85'; Hovhannisyan (yellow card) 90+2'; Noubissi (yellow card) 90+3'	Stadium: Vahagn Tumasyan Stadium; Referee: Henrik Nalbandian

6 May 2026 16	Ararat-Armenia	1–0	Pyunik	Abovyan
16:30 (UTC+4)	Banjaqui 9'	Report	Hovhannisyan (yellow card) 59'	Stadium: Vahagn Tumasyan Stadium; Referee: Artem Gasparyan
Note: Match originally scheduled for 28 February 2026, but postponed on 27 February due to adverse weather conditions.

9 May 2026 25	Pyunik	2–0	BKMA Yerevan	Yerevan
19:00 (UTC+4)	Moreno (yellow card) 37'; Noubissi 41' (pen.); Almeida (yellow card) 80'; Yansané 89' (pen.); Malakyan (yellow card) 90+1'	Report	Ar.Petrosyan (yellow card) 42'	Stadium: Academy Stadium; Referee: Ashot Ghaltakhchyan

18 May 2026 26	Gandzasar Kapan	0–2	Pyunik	Yerevan
19:00 (UTC+4)	Khachatryan (yellow card) 63'	Report	Moreno 16'; Yansané 65'	Stadium: Junior Stadium; Referee: Zaven Hovhannisyan

23 May 2026 13	Pyunik	0–0	Noah	Abovyan
19:00 (UTC+4)	Tarakhchyan (yellow card) 19'; Kulikov (yellow card) 30'	Report	Khamoyan (yellow card) 70'; Saintini (yellow card) 90+5'; Zolotić (yellow card) 90+5'	Stadium: Vahagn Tumasyan Stadium
Note: Match originally scheduled for 8 November 2025, but postponed.

27 May 2026 27	Pyunik	2–1	Van	Yerevan
19:00 (UTC+4)	Moreno 22' (pen.); Afyan (yellow card) 79'; Almeida 84'	Report	Avetisyan 3'; Sidamonidze (yellow card) 21'	Stadium: Academy Stadium; Referee: Sargis Khachatryan

==== League table ====
Pos	Team	Pld	W	D	L	GF	GA	GD	Pts	Qualification or relegation
1	Ararat-Armenia (C)	27	18	6	3	50	25	+25	60	Qualification for the Champions League first qualifying round
2	Noah	27	16	8	3	61	19	+42	56	Qualification for the Conference League second qualifying round (Note: The 2025–26 Armenian Cup winners (Noah) qualify for the Conference League second qualifying round.)
3	Pyunik	27	17	4	6	37	18	+19	55	Qualification for the Conference League first qualifying round
4	Alashkert	27	16	5	6	42	23	+19	53	Qualification for the Conference League first qualifying round
5	Urartu	27	14	7	6	43	26	+17	49	
6	Van	27	9	4	14	27	40	−13	31	
7	BKMA	27	4	11	12	30	42	−12	23	
8	Gandzasar Kapan	27	5	6	16	20	41	−21	21	
9	Ararat Yerevan	27	3	4	20	21	63	−42	13 (Note: Matches won: Ararat 3, Shirak 2)	
10	Shirak	27	2	7	18	17	51	−34	13	

Source: FFA
Rules for classification: 1) Points; 2) Head-to-head points; 3) Head-to-head goal difference; 4) Head-to-head goals scored; 5) Matches won; 6) Goal difference; 7) Less red cards; 8) Less yellow cards; 9) Fair-play ranking 10) Draw
(C) Champions

=== Armenian Cup ===
29 October 2025 Round of 16	Pyunik	3–0	Gandzasar Kapan	Abovyan
19:00 (UTC+4)	Hovhannisyan (yellow card) 28'; Noubissi 52'; Kulikov 61'; Kovalenko 82'	Report	Duffour (yellow card) 3'	Stadium: Vahagn Tumasyan Stadium; Referee: Artem Gasparyan

5 March 2026 Quarter-final 1st leg	Pyunik	1–2	Noah	Yerevan
15:00 (UTC+4)	Vakulenko (yellow card) 49'; Moreno 58' (pen.); Ocansey (red card) 90+5'	Report	Costache 49'; Hambardzumyan 67'	Stadium: Junior Sport Stadium; Referee: Henrik Nalbandian

1 April 2026 Quarter-final 2nd leg	Noah	2–2 (4–3 agg.)	Pyunik	Abovyan
16:00 (UTC+4)	Khamoyan 31' (yellow card) 80'; Sualehe (yellow card) 45+6'; Eteki (yellow card) 58'; Saintini (yellow card) 68'; Jakoliš 86'	Report	Miljković 37'; Hovhannisyan (yellow card) 45+1' (goal) 45+6'; Kovalenko (yellow card) 45+6'; Islamović (yellow card) 53'; Tarakhchyan (yellow card) 90+3'	Stadium: Vahagn Tumasyan Stadium; Referee: Ashot Harutyunyan

=== UEFA Conference League ===
==== Qualifying rounds ====
10 July 2025 First qualifying round 1st leg	Tre Fiori (San Marino)	1–0	Ararat-Armenia	Serravalle, San Marino
23:00 (UTC+4)	Prandelli (yellow card) 6'; Manfroni (yellow card) 35' (goal) 63'; Ferri (yellow card) 42'; Pini (yellow card) 70'	Report	Metoyan (yellow card) 24'; Malakyan (yellow card) 88'	Stadium: San Marino Stadium; Attendance: 305; Referee: Igor Bosca (Moldova)

17 July 2025 First qualifying round 2nd leg	Ararat-Armenia	5–0 (5–1 agg.)	(San Marino) Tre Fiori	Yerevan, Armenia
20:00 (UTC+4)	Otubanjo 14' (pen.), 85'; Alemão 24'; Noubissi 40' (pen.); Udo (yellow card) 78'; Metoyan (yellow card) 89'; Manfroni 89' (o.g.)	Report	Prandelli (yellow card) 19' (penalty missed) 55'; Matteoni (yellow card) 32'; Censoni (yellow card) 39'	Stadium: Republican Stadium; Attendance: 5,650; Referee: Florian Lata (Albania)

24 July 2025 Second qualifying round 1st leg	Pyunik (Armenia)	2–1	(Hungary) Győr	Yerevan, Armenia
20:00 (UTC+4)	Noubissi (yellow card) 8' (goal) 22' (pen.); Vakulenko (yellow card) 33'; Islamović (yellow card) 57'; Kulikov 66'; Almeida (yellow card) 85'	Report	Miljković 78' (o.g.)	Stadium: Republican Stadium; Attendance: 7,150; Referee: Jasmin Sabotic (Luxembourg)

31 July 2025 Second qualifying round 2nd leg	Győr (Hungary)	3–1 (4–3 agg.)	(Armenia) Pyunik	Yerevan, Armenia
20:00 (UTC+4)	Krpić (yellow card) 13'; Benbouali 16', 69'; Tóth (yellow card) 34'; Štefulj 90' (yellow card) 90'; Boldor (yellow card) 90+5'	Report	Islamović (yellow card) 75'; Ocansey 84'; Miljković (yellow card) 90+5'	Stadium: Yerevan Football Academy Stadium; Attendance: 5,055; Referee: Mervan Bejtullahu (Kosovo)

== Squad statistics ==
As of match played 27 May 2026

=== Appearances and goals ===
No.	Pos	Nat	Player	Total		Premier League		Armenian Cup		Conference League	
No.	Pos	Nat	Player	Apps	Goals	Apps	Goals	Apps	Goals	Apps	Goals
2	DF	(Brazil) BRA	Alemão	24	2	17+2	1	0+1	0	4	1
3	DF	(Greece) GRE	Nikos Kenourgios	17	0	4+8	0	0+1	0	3+1	0
5	DF	(Brazil) BRA	James Santos	13	0	5+6	0	0+2	0	0	0
7	MF	(Armenia) ARM	Edgar Malakyan	19	1	2+15	1	0+1	0	0+1	0
8	FW	(Armenia) ARM	Gevorg Tarakhchyan	29	3	19+4	3	3	0	2+1	0
10	MF	(Spain) ESP	Javi Moreno	33	6	27	5	2	1	3+1	0
11	MF	(Armenia) ARM	Artak Dashyan	9	0	7+1	0	0+1	0	0	0
13	MF	(Armenia) ARM	Daniyel Agbalyan	19	0	10+5	0	0+1	0	1+2	0
15	DF	(Russia) RUS	Mikhail Kovalenko	25	2	17+3	1	3	1	0+2	0
16	GK	(Armenia) ARM	Henri Avagyan	32	0	26	0	2	0	4	0
17	MF	(Armenia) ARM	Vyacheslav Afyan	5	0	0+5	0	0	0	0	0
18	MF	(Armenia) ARM	Karlen Hovhannisyan	28	1	18+6	0	3	1	0+1	0
19	FW	(Armenia) ARM	Sargis Metoyan	15	0	0+11	0	0+1	0	1+2	0
20	MF	(Brazil) BRA	Lucas Villela	17	1	3+11	1	0+3	0	0	0
22	MF	(Serbia) SRB	Sead Islamović	27	0	16+4	0	3	0	4	0
25	MF	(Russia) RUS	Daniil Kulikov	31	5	15+9	3	3	1	3+1	1
26	DF	(Serbia) SRB	Aleksandar Miljković	24	2	15+2	1	3	1	3+1	0
33	FW	(Ghana) GHA	Eric Ocansey	25	3	22+1	2	0+1	0	0+1	1
41	MF	(Armenia) ARM	Zhirayr Ashikyan	1	0	0+1	0	0	0	0	0
71	GK	(Armenia) ARM	Stanislav Buchnev	2	0	1	0	1	0	0	0
76	DF	(Portugal) POR	Filipe Almeida	31	1	20+4	1	3	0	4	0
79	DF	(Ukraine) UKR	Serhiy Vakulenko	29	2	20+2	2	3	0	4	0
88	DF	(Armenia) ARM	Robert Darbinyan	8	0	1+7	0	0	0	0	0
90	FW	(Guinea) GUI	Momo Yansané	15	7	12+1	7	2	0	0	0
99	FW	(Cameroon) CMR	Marius Noubissi	31	10	14+10	7	1+2	1	3+1	2
Players away on loan:
9	FW	(Lithuania) LTU	Matas Vareika	17	0	3+10	0	1	0	2+1	0
Players who left Pyunik during the season:
4	MF	(Armenia) ARM	Solomon Udo	1	0	0	0	0	0	0+1	0
11	DF	(Democratic Republic of the Congo) COD	Joël Bopesu	2	0	1+1	0	0	0	0	0
14	FW	(Nigeria) NGR	Yusuf Otubanjo	3	2	0	0	0	0	2+1	2
21	MF	(Armenia) ARM	Serob Galstyan	3	0	1+2	0	0	0	0	0
23	MF	(Brazil) BRA	Vagner Gonçalves	8	1	1+3	1	0+1	0	1+2	0

=== Goal scorers ===
Place	Position	Nation	Number	Name	Premier League	Armenian Cup	Conference League	Total
1	FW	(Cameroon)	99	Marius Noubissi	7	1	2	10
2	FW	(Guinea)	90	Momo Yansané	7	0	0	7
3	MF	(Spain)	10	Javi Moreno	5	1	0	6
4	MF	(Russia)	25	Daniil Kulikov	3	1	1	5
5	FW	(Armenia)	8	Gevorg Tarakhchyan	3	0	0	3
5	FW	(Ghana)	33	Eric Ocansey	2	0	1	3
7	DF	(Ukraine)	79	Serhiy Vakulenko	2	0	0	2
7	DF	(Brazil)	2	Alemão	1	0	1	2
7	DF	(Russia)	15	Mikhail Kovalenko	1	1	0	2
7	DF	(Serbia)	26	Aleksandar Miljković	1	1	0	2
7	FW	(Nigeria)	14	Yusuf Otubanjo	0	0	2	2
7				Own goal	1	0	1	2
13	MF	(Brazil)	23	Vagner Gonçalves	1	0	0	1
13	MF	(Armenia)	7	Edgar Malakyan	1	0	0	1
13	MF	(Brazil)	20	Lucas Villela	1	0	0	1
13	DF	(Portugal)	76	Filipe Almeida	1	0	0	1
13	MF	(Armenia)	18	Karlen Hovhannisyan	0	1	0	1
				TOTALS	37	6	8	51

=== Clean sheets ===
Place	Position	Nation	Number	Name	Premier League	Armenian Cup	Conference League	Total
1	GK	(Armenia)	16	Henri Avagyan	14	0	1	15
2	GK	(Armenia)	71	Stanislav Buchnev	0	1	0	1
				TOTALS	14	1	1	16

=== Disciplinary record ===
Number	Nation	Position	Name	Premier League		Armenian Cup		Conference League		Total	
Number	Nation	Position	Name	Yellow card	Red card	Yellow card	Red card	Yellow card	Red card	Yellow card	Red card
2	(Brazil)	DF	Alemão	1	0	0	0	0	0	1	0
3	(Greece)	DF	Nikos Kenourgios	1	0	0	0	0	0	1	0
5	(Brazil)	DF	James Santos	2	0	0	0	0	0	2	0
7	(Armenia)	MF	Edgar Malakyan	3	0	0	0	1	0	4	0
8	(Armenia)	FW	Gevorg Tarakhchyan	1	0	1	0	0	0	2	0
10	(Spain)	MF	Javi Moreno	3	0	0	0	0	0	3	0
11	(Armenia)	MF	Artak Dashyan	1	0	0	0	0	0	1	0
13	(Armenia)	MF	Daniyel Agbalyan	4	0	0	0	0	0	4	0
15	(Russia)	DF	Mikhail Kovalenko	5	0	1	0	0	0	6	0
16	(Armenia)	GK	Henri Avagyan	3	0	0	0	0	0	3	0
17	(Armenia)	MF	Vyacheslav Afyan	2	0	0	0	0	0	2	0
18	(Armenia)	MF	Karlen Hovhannisyan	5	0	2	0	0	0	7	0
19	(Armenia)	FW	Sargis Metoyan	1	0	0	0	2	0	3	0
20	(Brazil)	MF	Lucas Villela	1	0	0	0	0	0	1	0
22	(Serbia)	MF	Sead Islamović	4	0	1	0	2	0	7	0
25	(Russia)	MF	Daniil Kulikov	5	0	0	0	0	0	5	0
26	(Serbia)	DF	Aleksandar Miljković	6	1	0	0	1	0	7	1
33	(Ghana)	FW	Eric Ocansey	4	0	0	1	0	0	4	1
76	(Portugal)	DF	Filipe Almeida	6	0	0	0	1	0	7	0
79	(Ukraine)	DF	Serhiy Vakulenko	2	0	1	0	1	0	4	0
88	(Armenia)	DF	Robert Darbinyan	1	0	0	0	0	0	1	0
90	(Guinea)	FW	Momo Yansané	2	0	0	0	0	0	2	0
99	(Cameroon)	FW	Marius Noubissi	3	0	0	0	1	0	4	0
Players away on loan:
Players who left Pyunik during the season:
4	(Armenia)	MF	Solomon Udo	0	0	0	0	1	0	1	0
			TOTALS	66	1	6	1	11	0	83	2
