= 2026–27 FC Pyunik season =

Pyunik
2026-27 season
- Chairman: Rafik Hayrapetyan
- Manager: Artak Oseyan (until 7 September); Aram Gyulbudaghyants (Caretaker) (7 September - 1 October); Dmitri Gunko (from 1 October)
- Stadium: Vahagn Tumasyan Stadium; Academy Stadium
- Premier League: 5th
- Armenian Cup: Preseason
- UEFA Conference League: Second qualifying round vs Debrecen
| Home colours | Away colours |

The 2026–27 season is FC Pyunik's 33rd season in Armenian Premier League.

== Season overview ==
On 6 June, Pyunik announced the signing of Hovhannes Harutyunyan from Noah.

On 13 June, Pyunik announced the signing of Erik Simonyan from Urartu.

On 15 June, Pyunik announced the signing of Iasonas Pikis from Olympiakos Nicosia.

On 1 July, Pyunik announced the signing of Iman Griffith from Roda.

On 22 July, Pyunik announced the signing of Witi from Nacional.

On 16 August, Pyunik's home match against Sardarapat, scheduled for later that day, was postponed due to technical issues at the Academy Stadium.

On 7 September, Pyunik announced that Artak Oseyan had left his role as head coach of the club, with Aram Gyulbudaghyants being put in temporary charge.

On 11 September, Pyunik announced the signing of Tinde Teribe from AEL Limassol.

On 16 September. Pyunik announced the signing of Davit Hakobyan from Zeleziarne Podbrezova.

On 17 September, Pyunik announced the signing of Alisher Rakhimov from Ravshan Kulob.

On 1 October, Pyunik announced the appointment of Dmitri Gunko as their new permanent head coach.

== Squad ==
As of match played 6 November 2026

| Number | Name | Nationality | Position | Date of birth (age) | Signed from | Signed in | Contract ends | Apps. | Goals |
Goalkeepers
| 16 | Henri Avagyan | (Armenia) | GK | 16 January 1996 (age 30) | Ararat-Armenia | 2025 | 2029 | 70 | 0 |
| 71 | Stanislav Buchnev | (Armenia) | GK | 17 July 1990 (age 36) | Fakel Voronezh | 2020 | | 136 | 0 |
Defenders
| 3 | Nikos Kenourgios | (Greece) | DF | 8 September 1998 (age 28) | Athens Kallithea | 2025 | | 30 | 0 |
| 4 | Erik Simonyan | (Armenia) | DF | 12 June 2003 (age 23) | Urartu | 2026 | | 9 | 0 |
| 5 | James Santos | (Brazil) | DF | 15 July 1995 (age 31) | Unattached | 2026 | | 100 | 9 |
| 12 | Tinde Teribe | (Burkina Faso) | DF | 4 June 2007 (age 19) | AEL Limassol | 2026 | | 0 | 0 |
| 15 | Mikhail Kovalenko | (Russia) | DF | 25 January 1995 (age 31) | Olimp-Dolgoprudny | 2022 | | 153 | 13 |
| 76 | Filipe Almeida | (Portugal) | DF | 5 July 1997 (age 29) | Feirense | 2025 | | 45 | 1 |
| 79 | Serhiy Vakulenko | (Ukraine) | DF | 7 September 1993 (age 33) | Ararat-Armenia | 2022 | | 104 | 3 |
| 88 | Robert Darbinyan | (Armenia) | DF | 4 October 1995 (age 31) | Unattached | 2026 | | 21 | 0 |
Midfielders
| 7 | Edgar Malakyan | (Armenia) | MF | 22 September 1990 (age 36) | Unattached | 2023 | | | |
| 9 | Artak Dashyan | (Armenia) | MF | 20 November 1989 (age 36) | Unattached | 2026 | | 119 | 16 |
| 10 | Iman Griffith | (Netherlands) | MF | 2 December 2001 (age 24) | Roda | 2026 | | 13 | 3 |
| 11 | Hovhannes Harutyunyan | (Armenia) | MF | 25 May 1999 (age 27) | Noah | 2026 | | 172 | 27 |
| 17 | Vyacheslav Afyan | (Armenia) | MF | 28 October 2005 (age 21) | Academy | 2022 | | 13 | 1 |
| 20 | Davit Hakobyan | (Armenia) | MF | 9 August 2005 (age 21) | Zeleziarne Podbrezova | 2026 | | 4 | 0 |
| 22 | Sead Islamović | (Armenia) | MF | 24 September 1999 (age 27) | Novi Pazar | 2025 | | 45 | 2 |
| 25 | Daniil Kulikov | (Russia) | MF | 24 June 1998 (age 28) | Dinamo Minsk | 2025 | | 61 | 13 |
| 37 | Ashot Grigoryan | (Armenia) | MF | 2 September 2007 (age 19) | Academy | 2026 | | 1 | 0 |
| 44 | Hayk Tatosyan | (Armenia) | MF | 17 August 2004 (age 22) | Academy | 2020 | | 7 | 0 |
| 67 | Vardan Melikyan | (Armenia) | MF | 12 February 2008 (age 18) | Academy | 2026 | | 1 | 0 |
| 99 | Alisher Rakhimov | (Tajikistan) | MF | 8 April 2002 (age 24) | Ravshan Kulob | 2026 | | 0 | 0 |
| | Mohamed Bamba | (Ivory Coast) | MF | 22 May 2005 (age 21) | Torpedo-BelAZ Zhodino | 2026 | | 0 | 0 |
Forwards
| 8 | Gevorg Tarakhchyan | (Armenia) | FW | 15 March 2002 (age 24) | Alashkert | 2025 | | 44 | 9 |
| 14 | Steven Alfred | (Nigeria) | FW | 11 October 1997 (age 29) | Torpedo-BelAZ Zhodino | 2026 | | 22 | 2 |
| 19 | Sargis Metoyan | (Armenia) | FW | 6 September 1997 (age 29) | Alashkert | 2025 | | 22 | 0 |
| 23 | Witi | (Mozambique) | FW | 26 August 1996 (age 30) | Nacional | 2026 | | 14 | 1 |
| 29 | Iasonas Pikis | (Cyprus) | FW | 11 November 2000 (age 25) | Olympiakos Nicosia | 2026 | | 17 | 12 |
Players away on loan
| | Zhirayr Ashikyan | (Armenia) | MF | 7 November 2008 (age 18) | Academy | 2024 | | 1 | 0 |
| | Aris Karapetyan | (Armenia) | FW | 24 May 2005 (age 21) | Academy | 2022 | | 0 | 0 |
| | Matas Vareika | (Lithuania) | FW | 27 January 2000 (age 26) | Hegelmann | 2025 | | 33 | 8 |
Players who left during the season
| 18 | Karlen Hovhannisyan | (Armenia) | MF | 26 April 2005 (age 21) | Academy | 2023 | | 36 | 2 |
| 77 | Gonçalo Miguel | (Portugal) | DF | 6 May 2003 (age 23) | on loan from Ural Yekaterinburg | 2026 | | 0 | 0 |
| 95 | Momo Yansané | (Guinea) | FW | 29 July 1997 (age 29) | Omonia Aradippou | 2026 | | 22 | 8 |

== Transfers ==
=== In ===
| Date | Position | Nationality | Name | From | Fee | Ref. |
|---|---|---|---|---|---|---|
| 6 June 2026 | MF | (Armenia) | Hovhannes Harutyunyan | Noah | Undisclosed | |
| 13 June 2026 | MF | (Armenia) | Erik Simonyan | Urartu | Undisclosed | |
| 15 June 2026 | FW | (Cyprus) | Iasonas Pikis | Olympiakos Nicosia | Undisclosed | |
| 1 July 2026 | MF | (Netherlands) | Iman Griffith | Roda | Undisclosed | |
| 22 July 2026 | FW | (Mozambique) | Witi | Nacional | Undisclosed | |
| 11 September 2026 | DF | (Burkina Faso) | Tinde Teribe | AEL Limassol | Undisclosed | |
| 16 September 2026 | MF | (Armenia) | Davit Hakobyan | Zeleziarne Podbrezova | Undisclosed | |
| 17 September 2026 | MF | (Tajikistan) | Alisher Rakhimov | Ravshan Kulob | Undisclosed | |
| 23 September 2026 | MF | (Ivory Coast) | Mohamed Bamba | Torpedo-BelAZ Zhodino | Undisclosed | |
| 23 September 2026 | FW | (Nigeria) | Steven Alfred | Torpedo-BelAZ Zhodino | Undisclosed | |

=== Loans in ===
| Date from | Position | Nationality | Name | From | Date to | Ref. |
|---|---|---|---|---|---|---|
| 24 February 2026 | DF | (Portugal) | Gonçalo Miguel | Ural Yekaterinburg | 31 August 2026 | |

=== Out ===
| Date | Position | Nationality | Name | To | Fee | Ref. |
|---|---|---|---|---|---|---|
| 2 August 2026 | DF | (Armenia) | Ishkhan Darbinyan | Andranik | Undisclosed | |
| 1 September 2026 | MF | (Armenia) | Karlen Hovhannisyan | Akron Tolyatti | Undisclosed | |

=== Loans out ===
| Date from | Position | Nationality | Name | To | Date to | Ref. |
|---|---|---|---|---|---|---|
| 20 March 2026 | FW | (Lithuania) | Matas Vareika | Žalgiris | 31 December 2026 | |

=== Released ===
| Date | Position | Nationality | Name | Joined | Date | Ref |
|---|---|---|---|---|---|---|
| 28 August 2026 | FW | (Guinea) | Momo Yansané | Kerala Blasters | 8 October 2026 | |

== Competitions ==
=== Overview ===
| Competition | First match | Last match | Starting round | Final position | Record | | | | | | | |
| Competition | First match | Last match | Starting round | Final position | Pld | W | D | L | GF | GA | GD | Win % |
|---|---|---|---|---|---|---|---|---|---|---|---|---|
| Premier League | 2 August 2026 | 2027 | Matchday 1 | | 13 | 9 | 4 | 0 | 31 | 9 | +22 | 69.23 |
| Armenian Cup | 27 October 2026 | | Round of 16 | | 1 | 1 | 0 | 0 | 6 | 2 | +4 | 100.00 |
| UEFA Conference League | 9 July 2026 | 30 July 2026 | First qualifying round | Second qualifying round | 4 | 2 | 1 | 1 | 4 | 1 | +3 | 50.00 |
| Total | | | | | 18 | 12 | 5 | 1 | 41 | 12 | +29 | 66.67 |

Last updated: 6 November 2026
Source: Competitions

=== Premier League ===
==== Results summary ====
| Overall | | | | | | | | Home | | | | | | Away | | | | | |
| Pld | W | D | L | GF | GA | GD | Pts | W | D | L | GF | GA | GD | W | D | L | GF | GA | GD |
|---|---|---|---|---|---|---|---|---|---|---|---|---|---|---|---|---|---|---|---|
| 13 | 9 | 4 | 0 | 31 | 9 | +22 | 31 | 6 | 0 | 0 | 16 | 1 | +15 | 3 | 4 | 0 | 15 | 8 | +7 |

Last updated: 6 November 2026.
Source: See Results

==== Results by round ====
| Round | 1 | 2 | 4 | 5 | 6 | 3 | 7 | 8 | 9 | 10 | 11 | 12 | 13 |
|---|---|---|---|---|---|---|---|---|---|---|---|---|---|
| Ground | H | A | A | H | A | A | H | A | H | A | H | H | A |
| Result | D | W | W | W | D | W | W | D | W | D | W | W | W |
| Position | 5 | 5 | 3 | 5 | 4 | 2 | 2 | 3 | 2 | 3 | 3 | 3 | 2 |

Updated to match(es) played on 7 November 2026. Source: See Results
A = Away; H = Home; W = Win; D = Draw; L = Loss; P = Bye

==== Results ====
| 2 August 2026 1 | Urartu | 2–2 | Pyunik | Yerevan |
| 21:00 (UTC+4) | Velosa (yellow card) 75'; Mirzoyan 90+2'; Kenourgios 90+4' (o.g.) | Report | Griffith 8'; Tarakhchyan 69'; Darbinyan (yellow card) 74'; Kovalenko (yellow card) 90' (yellow-red card) 90' | Stadium: Urartu Stadium; Referee: Hovhannes Kalantaryan |

| 9 August 2026 2 | Pyunik | 3–0 | Van | Yerevan |
| 17:00 (UTC+4) | Pikis 13'; Hovhannisyan 40'; Tarakhchyan 70' | Report | Muradyan (yellow card) 31' | Stadium: Academy Stadium; Referee: Tiran Yeritsyan |

| 21 August 2026 4 | Ararat Yerevan | 0–2 | Pyunik | Yerevan |
| 19:00 (UTC+4) | Aslanyan (yellow card) 45+1'; Haroyan (red card) 55'; Berte (yellow card) 90'; Chukwu (yellow card) 90+8'; Alaverdyan (yellow card) 90+9' | Report | Hovhannisyan (yellow card) 24'; Pikis (yellow card) 55'; Harutyunyan (yellow card) 79'; Tarakhchyan 90+3'; Afyan 90+12' | Stadium: Republican Stadium; Referee: Vardan Vardumyan |

| 31 August 2026 5 | Pyunik | 2–1 | Ararat-Armenia | Yerevan |
| 20:00 (UTC+4) | Kulikov 16'; Tarakhchyan 32'; Kovalenko (yellow card) 77'; Islamović (yellow card) 77' | Report | Bueno (yellow card) 56'; França 67'; Pereira (yellow card) 88' | Stadium: Academy Stadium; Referee: Vardan Manukyan |

| 4 September 2026 6 | Syunik | 0–0 | Pyunik | Sisian |
| 16:00 (UTC+4) | Okiki (yellow card) 23'; Enning (red card) 64' | Report | | Stadium: City Stadium; Referee: Artem Gasparyan |

| 9 September 2026 3 | Sardarapat | 2–4 | Pyunik | Gyumri |
| 16:00 (UTC+4) | Minasyan 35'; Hakobyan 83' | Report | Islamović (yellow card) 15'; Kulikov 21'; Pikis 55', 70'; Vakulenko 81' | Stadium: City Stadium; Referee: Zaven Hovhannisyan |
Note: Match postponed on 16 August due to technical issues at the Football Academy Stadium.

| 13 September 2026 7 | Pyunik | 2–0 | Shirak | Yerevan |
| 19:00 (UTC+4) | Darbinyan (yellow card) 26'; Tarakhchyan (yellow card) 60'; Kulikov 69' (pen.); Pikis 81' | Report | Mnatsakanyan (yellow card) 51'; Sargsyan (yellow card) 55' | Stadium: Academy Stadium; Referee: Hovhannes Kalantaryan |

| 19 September 2026 8 | Alashkert | 3–3 | Pyunik | Armavir |
| 16:00 (UTC+4) | Hakobyan (yellow card) 35'; Farayola (yellow card) 37'; Adebayo 43'; Nalbandyan 75' (pen.); Massoumou 84' | Report | Pikis 5', 90+6'; Witi 21'; Vakulenko (yellow card) 29'; Tarakhchyan (yellow card) 53'; Santos (yellow card) 65'; Simonyan (yellow card) 73' | Stadium: Hakob Tonoyan Stadium; Referee: Vardan Manukyan |

| 12 October 2026 9 | Pyunik | 5–0 | BKMA Yerevan | Yerevan |
| 19:00 (UTC+4) | Tarakhchyan 1'; Islamović 24'; Kovalenko 29'; Kulikov 53' (pen.); Pikis 62'; James (yellow card) 84' | Report | Askaryan (red card) 23' | Stadium: Academy Stadium; Referee: Ashot Ghaltakhchyan |

| 18 October 2026 10 | Noah | 1–1 | Pyunik | Abovyan |
| 20:00 (UTC+4) | Dombila (yellow card) 29'; Lazetić 51'; Hambardzumyan (yellow card) 72' | Report | Kulikov (yellow card) 20' (goal) 31' | Stadium: Vahagn Tumasyan Stadium; Referee: Artem Gasparyan |

| 23 October 2026 11 | Pyunik | 3–0 | Gandzasar | Yerevan |
| 19:00 (UTC+4) | Islamović 59'; Pikis 76'; Davtyan 83' (o.g.) | Report | | Stadium: Freedom Arena; Referee: Tiran Yeritsyan |

| 30 October 2026 12 | Pyunik | 1–0 | Urartu | Yerevan |
| 19:00 (UTC+4) | Pikis (yellow card) 5'; Kulikov (yellow card) 45'; Dashyan (yellow card) 58'; Darbinyan (yellow card) 81'; Kovalenko 87' | Report | Piloyan (yellow card) 7'; Mkrtchyan (yellow card) 90+4' | Stadium: Freedom Arena; Referee: Ashot Ghaltakhchyan |

| 6 November 2026 13 | Van | 0–3 | Pyunik | Charentsavan |
| 15:00 (UTC+4) | Bokov (yellow card) 11'; Lweendo (yellow card) 37' | Report | Darbinyan (yellow card) 3'; Kulikov 13' (pen.); Pikis 66'; Griffith 73'; Tatosyan (yellow card) 83' | Stadium: City Stadium; Referee: Vardan Vardumyan |

| 22 November 2026 14 | Pyunik | – | Sardarapat | Yerevan |
| 17:00 (UTC+4) | | Report | | Stadium: Freedom Arena |

==== League table ====
| Pos | Team | Pld | W | D | L | GF | GA | GD | Pts | Qualification or relegation |
|---|---|---|---|---|---|---|---|---|---|---|
| 1 | Noah | 13 | 11 | 1 | 1 | 32 | 10 | +22 | 34 | Qualification for the Champions League first qualifying round |
| 2 | Pyunik | 13 | 9 | 4 | 0 | 31 | 9 | +22 | 31 | Qualification for the Conference League second qualifying round |
| 3 | Ararat-Armenia | 12 | 9 | 2 | 1 | 24 | 10 | +14 | 29 | Qualification for the Conference League first qualifying round |
| 4 | Alashkert | 13 | 7 | 4 | 2 | 28 | 12 | +16 | 25 | |
| 5 | Sardarapat | 13 | 5 | 5 | 3 | 20 | 20 | 0 | 20 | |
| 6 | Urartu | 12 | 4 | 4 | 4 | 19 | 15 | +4 | 16 | |
| 7 | Shirak | 13 | 4 | 2 | 7 | 14 | 16 | −2 | 14 | |
| 8 | Van | 13 | 3 | 2 | 8 | 12 | 32 | −20 | 11 | |
| 9 | Ararat Yerevan | 13 | 3 | 2 | 8 | 10 | 21 | −11 | 11 | |
| 10 | BKMA | 13 | 3 | 2 | 8 | 14 | 23 | −9 | 11 | |
| 11 | Syunik | 12 | 2 | 2 | 8 | 11 | 26 | −15 | 8 | |
| 12 | Gandzasar Kapan | 12 | 1 | 0 | 11 | 9 | 30 | −21 | 3 | Relegation to the Armenian First League |

Updated to match(es) played on 7 November 2026. Source: FFA
Rules for classification: 1) Points; 2) Head-to-head points; 3) Head-to-head goal difference; 4) Head-to-head goals scored; 5) Matches won; 6) Goal difference; 7) Less red cards; 8) Less yellow cards ; 9) Fair-play ranking 10) Draw

=== Armenian Cup ===
| 27 October 2026 Round of 16 | Pyunik | 6–2 | Ararat Yerevan | Yerevan |
| 19:00 (UTC+4) | Griffith 5' (yellow card) 47'; Pikis 20', 32', 57'; Kenourgios (yellow card) 44'; Tarakhchyan 55'; Malakyan 70' | Report | Ukadike (yellow card) 40' (goal) 63'; Handzongo 81' | Stadium: Freedom Arena; Referee: Hovhannes Kalantaryan |

| | – |
| (UTC+4) |

=== UEFA Conference League ===
==== Qualifying rounds ====
| 9 July 2026 First qualifying round 1st leg | Marsaxlokk (Malta) | 0–3 | (Armenia) Pyunik | Ta' Qali, Malta |
| 21:00 (UTC+4) | Corbalan (yellow card) 40'; Muscat (yellow card) 90+3' | Report | Yansané 41' (pen.); Dashyan 51'; Kovalenko 87' | Stadium: Centenary Stadium; Attendance: 396; Referee: Miloš Gigović (Bosnia and Herzegovina) |

| 16 July 2026 First qualifying round 2nd leg | Pyunik (Armenia) | 1–0 (4–0 agg.) | (Malta) Marsaxlokk | Yerevan, Armenia |
| 20:00 (UTC+4) | Islamović (yellow card) 21'; Kulikov 80' (pen.); Metoyan (yellow card) 85' | Report | Arias (yellow card) 8'; Mafoumbi (red card) 10'; Weder (yellow card) 59'; Corbalan (yellow card) 80' | Stadium: Republican Stadium; Attendance: 2,350; Referee: Aaron O'Dowd (Republic of Ireland) |

| 23 July 2026 Second qualifying round 1st leg | Debrecen (Hungary) | 1–0 | (Armenia) Pyunik | Debrecen, Hungary |
| 20:00 (UTC+4) | Cibla 55'; Bošković (yellow card) 90+4' | Report | James (yellow card) 33'; Witi (yellow card) 82'; Kovalenko (yellow card) 88' | Stadium: Nagyerdei Stadion; Attendance: 8,523; Referee: Jacob Karlsen (Denmark) |

| 30 July 2026 Second qualifying round 2nd leg | Pyunik (Armenia) | 0–0 (0–1 agg.) | (Hungary) Debrecen | Yerevan, Armenia |
| 20:00 (UTC+4) | Witi (yellow card) 69' | Report | Lang (yellow card) 65'; Szendrei (yellow card) 90+5' | Stadium: Republican Stadium; Attendance: 3,895; Referee: Igor Stojchevski (North Macedonia) |

== Squad statistics ==
As of match played 6 November 2026

=== Appearances and goals ===
| No. | Pos | Nat | Player | Total | | Premier League | | Armenian Cup | | Conference League | |
| No. | Pos | Nat | Player | Apps | Goals | Apps | Goals | Apps | Goals | Apps | Goals |
|---|---|---|---|---|---|---|---|---|---|---|---|
| 3 | DF | (Greece) GRE | Nikos Kenourgios | 13 | 0 | 5+3 | 0 | 1 | 0 | 3+1 | 0 |
| 4 | DF | (Armenia) ARM | Erik Simonyan | 9 | 0 | 6+1 | 0 | 0 | 0 | 1+1 | 0 |
| 5 | DF | (Brazil) BRA | James Santos | 15 | 0 | 12+1 | 0 | 0 | 0 | 2 | 0 |
| 7 | MF | (Armenia) ARM | Edgar Malakyan | 11 | 1 | 0+8 | 0 | 0+1 | 1 | 0+2 | 0 |
| 8 | FW | (Armenia) ARM | Gevorg Tarakhchyan | 15 | 6 | 8+5 | 5 | 0+1 | 1 | 0+1 | 0 |
| 9 | MF | (Armenia) ARM | Artak Dashyan | 12 | 1 | 6+3 | 0 | 0 | 0 | 3 | 1 |
| 10 | MF | (Netherlands) NED | Iman Griffith | 13 | 3 | 7+2 | 2 | 1 | 1 | 0+3 | 0 |
| 11 | MF | (Armenia) ARM | Hovhannes Harutyunyan | 16 | 0 | 5+6 | 0 | 1 | 0 | 4 | 0 |
| 14 | FW | (Nigeria) NGR | Steven Alfred | 1 | 0 | 0+1 | 0 | 0 | 0 | 0 | 0 |
| 15 | DF | (Russia) RUS | Mikhail Kovalenko | 16 | 3 | 6+5 | 2 | 1 | 0 | 4 | 1 |
| 16 | GK | (Armenia) ARM | Henri Avagyan | 9 | 0 | 5 | 0 | 0 | 0 | 4 | 0 |
| 17 | MF | (Armenia) ARM | Vyacheslav Afyan | 7 | 1 | 1+4 | 1 | 0+1 | 0 | 0+1 | 0 |
| 19 | FW | (Armenia) ARM | Sargis Metoyan | 7 | 0 | 0+5 | 0 | 0 | 0 | 0+2 | 0 |
| 20 | MF | (Armenia) ARM | Davit Hakobyan | 4 | 0 | 3 | 0 | 1 | 0 | 0 | 0 |
| 22 | MF | (Serbia) SRB | Sead Islamović | 17 | 2 | 12 | 2 | 1 | 0 | 4 | 0 |
| 23 | FW | (Mozambique) MOZ | Witi | 15 | 1 | 10+2 | 1 | 1 | 0 | 0+2 | 0 |
| 25 | MF | (Russia) RUS | Daniil Kulikov | 15 | 7 | 10+1 | 6 | 0 | 0 | 4 | 1 |
| 29 | FW | (Cyprus) CYP | Iasonas Pikis | 18 | 12 | 12+1 | 9 | 1 | 3 | 2+2 | 0 |
| 37 | MF | (Armenia) ARM | Ashot Grigoryan | 1 | 0 | 0+1 | 0 | 0 | 0 | 0 | 0 |
| 44 | MF | (Armenia) ARM | Hayk Tatosyan | 7 | 0 | 0+6 | 0 | 0+1 | 0 | 0 | 0 |
| 67 | MF | (Armenia) ARM | Vardan Melikyan | 1 | 0 | 0+1 | 0 | 0 | 0 | 0 | 0 |
| 71 | GK | (Armenia) ARM | Stanislav Buchnev | 9 | 0 | 8 | 0 | 1 | 0 | 0 | 0 |
| 76 | DF | (Portugal) POR | Filipe Almeida | 14 | 0 | 10 | 0 | 1 | 0 | 3 | 0 |
| 79 | DF | (Ukraine) UKR | Serhiy Vakulenko | 14 | 1 | 9 | 1 | 0+1 | 0 | 4 | 0 |
| 88 | DF | (Armenia) ARM | Robert Darbinyan | 13 | 0 | 4+5 | 0 | 1 | 0 | 0+3 | 0 |
Players away on loan:
Players who left Pyunik during the season:
| 18 | MF | (Armenia) ARM | Karlen Hovhannisyan | 7 | 1 | 3 | 1 | 0 | 0 | 4 | 0 |
| 95 | FW | (Guinea) GUI | Momo Yansané | 7 | 1 | 1+2 | 0 | 0 | 0 | 2+2 | 1 |

=== Goal scorers ===
| Place | Position | Nation | Number | Name | Premier League | Armenian Cup | Conference League | Total |
|---|---|---|---|---|---|---|---|---|
| 1 | FW | (Cyprus) | 29 | Iasonas Pikis | 9 | 3 | 0 | 12 |
| 2 | MF | (Russia) | 25 | Daniil Kulikov | 6 | 0 | 1 | 7 |
| 3 | FW | (Armenia) | 8 | Gevorg Tarakhchyan | 5 | 1 | 0 | 6 |
| 4 | MF | (Netherlands) | 10 | Iman Griffith | 2 | 1 | 0 | 3 |
| 4 | DF | (Russia) | 15 | Mikhail Kovalenko | 2 | 0 | 1 | 3 |
| 6 | MF | (Serbia) | 22 | Sead Islamović | 2 | 0 | 0 | 2 |
| 7 | MF | (Armenia) | 18 | Karlen Hovhannisyan | 1 | 0 | 0 | 1 |
| 7 | MF | (Armenia) | 17 | Vyacheslav Afyan | 1 | 0 | 0 | 1 |
| 7 | DF | (Ukraine) | 79 | Serhiy Vakulenko | 1 | 0 | 0 | 1 |
| 7 | FW | (Mozambique) | 23 | Witi | 1 | 0 | 0 | 1 |
| 7 | MF | (Armenia) | 7 | Edgar Malakyan | 0 | 1 | 0 | 1 |
| 7 | FW | (Guinea) | 95 | Momo Yansané | 0 | 0 | 1 | 1 |
| 7 | MF | (Armenia) | 9 | Artak Dashyan | 0 | 0 | 1 | 1 |
| 7 | | | | Own goal | 1 | 0 | 0 | 1 |
| | | | | TOTALS | 31 | 6 | 4 | 41 |

=== Clean sheets ===
| Place | Position | Nation | Number | Name | Premier League | Armenian Cup | Conference League | Total |
|---|---|---|---|---|---|---|---|---|
| 1 | GK | (Armenia) | 16 | Henri Avagyan | 3 | 0 | 3 | 6 |
| 2 | GK | (Armenia) | 71 | Stanislav Buchnev | 5 | 0 | 0 | 5 |
| | | | | TOTALS | 8 | 0 | 3 | 11 |

=== Disciplinary record ===
| Number | Nation | Position | Name | Premier League | | Armenian Cup | | Conference League | | Total | |
| Number | Nation | Position | Name | Yellow card | Red card | Yellow card | Red card | Yellow card | Red card | Yellow card | Red card |
| 3 | (Greece) | DF | Nikos Kenourgios | 0 | 0 | 1 | 0 | 0 | 0 | 1 | 0 |
| 4 | (Armenia) | DF | Erik Simonyan | 1 | 0 | 0 | 0 | 0 | 0 | 1 | 0 |
| 5 | (Brazil) | DF | James Santos | 2 | 0 | 0 | 0 | 1 | 0 | 3 | 0 |
| 8 | (Armenia) | FW | Gevorg Tarakhchyan | 2 | 0 | 0 | 0 | 0 | 0 | 2 | 0 |
| 9 | (Armenia) | MF | Artak Dashyan | 1 | 0 | 0 | 0 | 0 | 0 | 1 | 0 |
| 10 | (Netherlands) | MF | Iman Griffith | 0 | 0 | 1 | 0 | 0 | 0 | 1 | 0 |
| 11 | (Armenia) | MF | Hovhannes Harutyunyan | 1 | 0 | 0 | 0 | 0 | 0 | 1 | 0 |
| 15 | (Russia) | DF | Mikhail Kovalenko | 3 | 1 | 0 | 0 | 1 | 0 | 4 | 1 |
| 19 | (Armenia) | FW | Sargis Metoyan | 0 | 0 | 0 | 0 | 1 | 0 | 1 | 0 |
| 22 | (Serbia) | MF | Sead Islamović | 2 | 0 | 0 | 0 | 1 | 0 | 3 | 0 |
| 23 | (Mozambique) | FW | Witi | 0 | 0 | 0 | 0 | 2 | 0 | 2 | 0 |
| 25 | (Russia) | MF | Daniil Kulikov | 2 | 0 | 0 | 0 | 0 | 0 | 2 | 0 |
| 29 | (Cyprus) | FW | Iasonas Pikis | 2 | 0 | 0 | 0 | 0 | 0 | 2 | 0 |
| 44 | (Armenia) | MF | Hayk Tatosyan | 1 | 0 | 0 | 0 | 0 | 0 | 1 | 0 |
| 79 | (Ukraine) | DF | Serhiy Vakulenko | 1 | 0 | 0 | 0 | 0 | 0 | 1 | 0 |
| 88 | (Armenia) | DF | Robert Darbinyan | 4 | 0 | 0 | 0 | 0 | 0 | 4 | 0 |
Players away on loan:
Players who left Pyunik during the season:
| 18 | (Armenia) | MF | Karlen Hovhannisyan | 1 | 0 | 0 | 0 | 0 | 0 | 1 | 0 |
| | | | TOTALS | 23 | 1 | 2 | 0 | 6 | 0 | 31 | 1 |
