= Steven Alfred =

Nigerian footballer (born 1997)

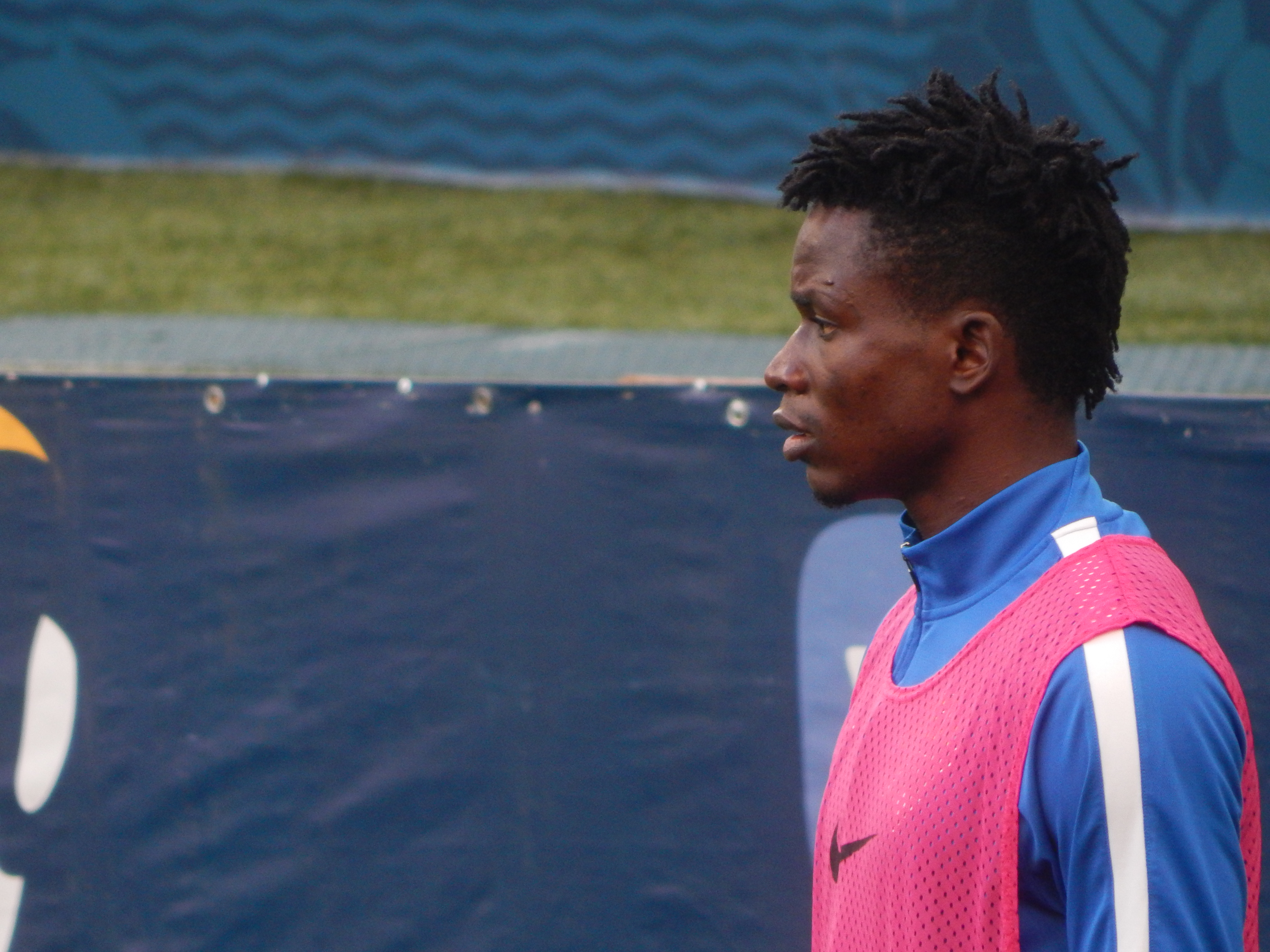

Personal information
- Date of birth: 11 October 1997 (age 29)
- Place of birth: Nigeria
- Height: 1.78 m (5 ft 10 in)
- Position: Forward

Team information
- Current team: Pyunik
- Number: 14

Senior career*
Years	Team	Apps	(Gls)
2018	Kwara United	22	(9)
2018	Saxan	5	(11)
2019–2020	Sochi	7	(0)
2019–2020	→ Pyunik (loan)	9	(1)
2020	Pyunik	8	(1)
2021	Slutsk	24	(9)
2022–2023	Hapoel Hadera	38	(7)
2023–2024	Maccabi Herzliya	26	(4)
2024	Dinamo Minsk	12	(4)
2025	Shinnik Yaroslavl	8	(0)
2025–2026	Torpedo-BelAZ Zhodino	9	(2)
2026–	Pyunik	1	(0)
- * Club domestic league appearances and goals as of 19 October 2026

Steven Alfred (born 11 October 1997) is a Nigerian professional footballer who plays for Armenian club Pyunik.

== Club career ==
Alfred made his debut in the Russian Football National League for Sochi on 16 March 2019 in a game against Krasnodar-2.

On 5 July 2019, Alfred joined Pyunik on loan. On 26 January 2021, Alfred left Pyunik by mutual consent.

On 27 June 2025, Alfred returned to Belarus and signed with Torpedo-BelAZ Zhodino.

In September 2026, Alfred returned to Pyunik.

== Career statistics ==
=== Club ===
As of match played 18 October 2026

Appearances and goals by club, season and competition
Club	Season	League			National Cup		League Cup		Continental		Other		Total	
Club	Season	Division	Apps	Goals	Apps	Goals	Apps	Goals	Apps	Goals	Apps	Goals	Apps	Goals
Kwara United	2018	NPFL	22	9	0	0	–		–		–		22	9
Saxan	2018	Divizia A	5	11	0	0	–		–		–		5	11
Sochi	2018–19	FNL	7	0	0	0	–		–		–		7	0
Sochi	2019–20	Russian Premier League	0	0	0	0	–		–		–		0	0
Sochi	Total		7	0	0	0	-	-	-	-	-	-	7	0
Pyunik (loan)	2019–20	Armenian Premier League	9	1	0	0	–		4	0	–		13	1
Pyunik	2020–21	Armenian Premier League	8	1	0	0	–		–		–		8	1
Slutsk	2021	Belarusian Premier League	24	9	0	0	–		–		–		24	9
Hapoel Hadera	2021–22	Israeli Premier League	12	2	2	1	0	0	–		–		14	3
Hapoel Hadera	2022–23	Israeli Premier League	26	5	1	0	2	0	–		–		29	5
Hapoel Hadera	Total		38	7	3	1	2	0	-	-	-	-	43	8
Maccabi Herzliya	2023–24	Liga Leumit	26	4	0	0	0	0	–		–		26	4
Dinamo Minsk	2024	Belarusian Premier League	12	4	0	0	–		11	2	–		23	6
Shinnik Yaroslavl	2024–25	Russian First League	8	0	0	0	–		–		–		8	0
Torpedo-BelAZ Zhodino	2025	Belarusian Premier League	6	2	1	0	–		4	2	–		11	4
Torpedo-BelAZ Zhodino	2026	Belarusian Premier League	3	0	0	0	–		–		–		3	0
Torpedo-BelAZ Zhodino	Total		9	2	1	0	-	-	4	2	-	-	14	4
Pyunik	2026–27	Armenian Premier League	1	0	0	0	–		0	0	–		1	0
Career total			169	48	4	1	2	0	19	4	-	-	194	53
