= Eric Ocansey =

Ghanaian footballer

Personal information
- Date of birth: 22 August 1997 (age 29)
- Place of birth: Tema, Ghana
- Height: 1.73 m (5 ft 8 in)
- Position: Winger

Team information
- Current team: Javor Ivanjica
- Number: 28

Youth career
- Aspire Academy

Senior career*
Years	Team	Apps	(Gls)
2015–2019	Eupen	115	(16)
2019–2023	Kortrijk	58	(4)
2022	→ Waasland-Beveren (loan)	9	(0)
2023–2024	Lierse	27	(6)
2024–2025	Ararat-Armenia	25	(4)
2025–2026	Pyunik	23	(2)
2026–	Javor Ivanjica	0	(0)
- * Club domestic league appearances and goals as of 29 June 2026

Eric Ocansey (born 22 August 1997) is a Ghanaian professional footballer who plays as a winger for Serbian club Javor Ivanjica.

== Career ==
Ocansey made his professional debut with Belgian club Eupen in 2015.

On 31 January 2022, he joined Waasland-Beveren on loan until the end of the 2021–22 season.

On 9 May 2023, Ocansey signed a contract with Lierse for the 2023–24 season.

On 20 June 2024, Armenian Premier League club Ararat-Armenia announced the signing of Ocansey. On 6 June 2025, Ararat-Armenia announced the departure of Ocansey.

On 15 July 2025, Pyunik announced the signing of Ocansey. On 29 June 2026, Pyunik announced that Ocansey had left the club.

== Career statistics ==
As of match played 27 May 2026

Club	Season	League			National cup (Note: Includes Belgian Cup and Armenian Cup.)		League cup		Continental		Other		Total	
Club	Season	Division	Apps	Goals	Apps	Goals	Apps	Goals	Apps	Goals	Apps	Goals	Apps	Goals
Eupen	2015–16	Belgian Second Division	23	3	0	0	—		—		—		0	0
Eupen	2016–17	Belgian Pro League	19	4	2	0	—		—		5 (Note: Appearances and goals in the Europa League play-offs)	1	26	5
Eupen	2017–18	Belgian Pro League	28	6	1	0	—		—		9	0	38	6
Eupen	2018–19	Belgian Pro League	22	2	1	0	—		—		9	0	32	2
Eupen	Total		92	15	4	0	—		—		23	1	119	16
Kortrijk	2019–20	Belgian Pro League	22	2	3	0	—		—		—		25	2
Kortrijk	2020–21	Belgian Pro League	31	1	2	0	—		—		—		33	1
Kortrijk	2021–22	Belgian Pro League	5	1	1	0	—		—		—		6	1
Kortrijk	2022–23	Belgian Pro League	0	0	0	0	—		—		—		0	0
Kortrijk	Total		58	4	6	0	—		—		—		64	4
Waasland-Beveren (loan)	2021–22	Belgian First Division B	9	0	0	0	—		—		—		9	0
Lierse	2023–24	Challenger Pro League	27	6	2	0	—		—		—		29	6
Ararat-Armenia	2024–25	Armenian Premier League	25	4	5	1	—		4 (Note: Appearances and goals in the UEFA Europa Conference League)	2	1 (Note: Includes Armenian Supercup)	0	35	7
Pyunik	2025–26	Armenian Premier League	23	2	1	0	—		1	1	—		25	3
Total			234	31	18	1	0	0	5	3	24	1	281	38
