= Momo Yansané =

Guinean footballer (born 1997)

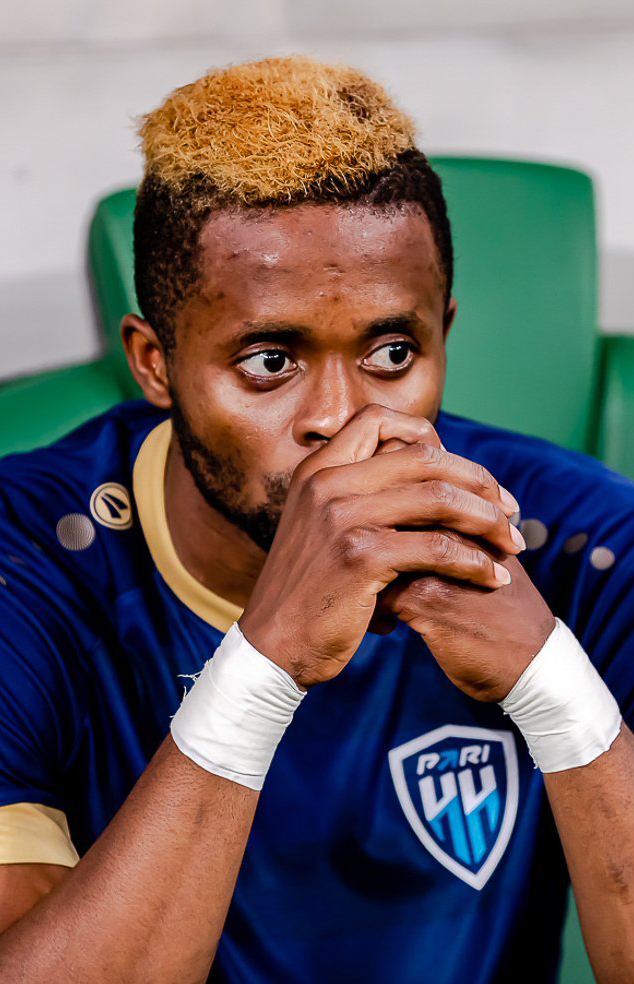
- Yansané during his loan spell at Nizhny Novgorod

Personal information
- Date of birth: 29 July 1997 (age 29)
- Place of birth: Fria, Guinea
- Height: 1.83 m (6 ft 0 in)
- Position: Forward

Team information
- Current team: Kerala Blasters

Senior career*
Years	Team	Apps	(Gls)
2016–2017	Hafia		(14)
2017–2019	FUS Rabat	9	(1)
2019	→ Isloch Minsk Raion (loan)	28	(11)
2020	Isloch Minsk Raion	23	(8)
2020–2021	Black Stars		
2021	→ Nizhny Novgorod (loan)	16	(6)
2021–2023	Sheriff Tiraspol	20	(12)
2022–2023	→ Nizhny Novgorod (loan)	16	(0)
2023–2024	Rijeka	9	(0)
2024–2025	Torpedo Kutaisi	11	(3)
2025	Sumgayit	14	(1)
2025–2026	Omonia Aradippou	13	(1)
2026	Pyunik	16	(7)
2026–	Kerala Blasters	4	(1)

International career
2016–2017	Guinea U20	5	(0)
2021	Guinea	1	(0)
- * Club domestic league appearances and goals as of 11 October 2026

Momo Yansané (born 29 July 1997) is a Guinean professional footballer who plays as a forward for Indian Super League club Kerala Blasters FC.

== Club career ==
On 29 January 2021, Nizhny Novgorod announced the signing of Yansané.

On 1 July 2021, Sheriff Tiraspol announced the signing of Yansané. On 8 September 2022, Yansané returned to Nizhny Novgorod on a season-long loan with an option to buy. He left Nizhny Novgorod at the end of the 2022–23 season.

On 9 September 2023, HNK Rijeka announced the signing of free-agent Yansané to a two-year contract.

On 12 July 2024, the player joined Erovnuli Liga club Torpedo Kutaisi on a two-year deal.

On 21 January 2025, Azerbaijan Premier League club Sumgayit announced the signing of Yansané.

On 25 January 2025, Armenian Premier League club Pyunik announced the signing of Yansané. On 28 August 2026, Yansané left Pyunik by mutual agreement.

Yansané was signed by the Indian Super League club Kerala Blasters in October 2026. He made his debut for the club on 11 October 2026 against Inter Kashi FC by coming as a substitute in a 2–0 victory.

== International career ==
Yansané played for Guinea at 2017 Africa U-20 Cup of Nations and 2017 FIFA U-20 World Cup. He debuted with the senior Guinea national team in a 1–1 2022 FIFA World Cup qualification tie with Sudan on 6 October 2021.

== Career statistics ==
=== Club ===
As of match played 11 October 2026

Appearances and goals by club, season and competition
Club	Season	League			National cup		Continental		Other		Total	
Club	Season	Division	Apps	Goals	Apps	Goals	Apps	Goals	Apps	Goals	Apps	Goals
FUS Rabat	2017–18	Botola	9	1	—		5 (Note: Two appearances in the CAF Confederation Cup, three appearances in the Arab Club Championship)	0	—		14	1
Isloch Minsk Raion	2019	Belarusian Premier League	28	11	4	2	—		—		32	13
Isloch Minsk Raion	2020	Belarusian Premier League	23	8	2	2	—		—		25	10
Isloch Minsk Raion	Total		51	19	6	4	0	0	0	0	57	23
Nizhny Novgorod (loan)	2020–21	FNL Division	16	6	0	0	—		—		16	6
Sheriff Tiraspol	2021–22	Divizia Națională	16	11	2	0	12 (Note: 10 appearances and one goal in the UEFA Champions League, two appearances and zero goals in the UEFA Europa League)	1	0 (Note: Appearances in the Moldovan Super Cup)	0	30	12
Sheriff Tiraspol	2022–23	Divizia Națională	1	0	0	0	4 (Note: Appearances and goals in the UEFA Champions League)	1	0	0	5	1
Sheriff Tiraspol	2023–24	Divizia Națională	3	1	0	0	3 (Note: Zero Appearances and goals in the UEFA Champions League, three Appearances and two goals in the UEFA Europa League)	2	0	0	6	3
Sheriff Tiraspol	Total		20	12	2	0	19	4	0	0	41	16
Nizhny Novgorod (loan)	2022–23	RPL	16	0	5	0	—		0 (Note: Appearances in the Relegation Playoffs)	0	21	0
HNK Rijeka	2023–24	Croatian Football League	9	0	2	2	—		—		11	2
Torpedo Kutaisi	2024	Erovnuli Liga	11	3	0	0	2 (Note: Appearances and goals in the UEFA Conference League)	2	—		13	5
Sumgayit	2024–25	Azerbaijan Premier League	14	1	2	0	0	0	—		16	1
Omonia Aradippou	2025–26	Cypriot First Division	13	1	1	2	—		—		14	3
Pyunik	2025–26	Armenian Premier League	13	7	2	0	0	0	—		15	7
Pyunik	2026–27	Armenian Premier League	3	0	0	0	4	1	—		7	1
Pyunik	Total		16	7	2	0	4	1	0	0	22	8
Kerala Blasters	2026–27	Indian Super League	1	0	0	0	—		—		1	0
Career total			176	50	20	8	30	7	0	0	226	65

== Honours ==
Sheriff Tiraspol

- Divizia Națională: 2021–22
- Moldovan Cup: 2021–22
