= Karlen Hovhannisyan =

Armenian footballer (born 2005)

Personal information
- Full name: Karlen Karenovich Hovhannisyan
- Date of birth: 26 April 2005 (age 21)
- Place of birth: Ashtarak, Armenia
- Height: 1.73 m (5 ft 8 in)
- Position: Central midfielder

Team information
- Current team: Akron Tolyatti
- Number: 6

Youth career
- Pyunik

Senior career*
| Years | Team | Apps | (Gls) |
| 2021–2023 | Pyunik-2 | 37 | (2) |
| 2022–2026 | Pyunik | 30 | (1) |
| 2023–2025 | → BKMA Yerevan (loan) | 50 | (2) |
| 2023–2025 | → BKMA Yerevan-2 (loan) | 9 | (1) |
| 2026– | Akron Tolyatti | 8 | (1) |

International career^{‡}
| 2021 | Armenia U16 | 1 | (0) |
| 2021 | Armenia U17 | 4 | (0) |
| 2022–2023 | Armenia U19 | 9 | (1) |
| 2024– | Armenia U21 | 11 | (1) |
| 2026– | Armenia | 8 | (0) |
- * Club domestic league appearances and goals as of 8 November 2026 ‡ National team caps and goals as of 15 November 2026

Karlen Hovhannisyan (Armenian: Կառլեն Հովհաննիսյան; born 26 April 2005) is an Armenian football player who plays as a central midfielder for Russian Premier League club Akron Tolyatti and the Armenia national team.

== Club career ==
On 1 September 2026, Hovhannisyan signed a five-year contract with Russian Premier League club Akron Tolyatti. He made his RPL debut for Akron on 6 September 2026 in a game against Orenburg.

== International career ==
Hovhannisyan made his debut for Armenia national team on 29 March 2026 in a friendly against Belarus.

== Career statistics ==
As of 8 November 2026

| Club | Season | League | | | Cup | | Continental | | Total | |
| Club | Season | Division | Apps | Goals | Apps | Goals | Apps | Goals | Apps | Goals |
|---|---|---|---|---|---|---|---|---|---|---|
| Pyunik-2 | 2020–21 | Armenian First League | 1 | 0 | — | | — | | 1 | 0 |
| Pyunik-2 | 2021–22 | Armenian First League | 16 | 1 | — | | — | | 16 | 1 |
| Pyunik-2 | 2022–23 | Armenian First League | 20 | 1 | — | | — | | 20 | 1 |
| Pyunik-2 | Total | | 37 | 2 | 0 | 0 | 0 | 0 | 37 | 2 |
| Pyunik | 2021–22 | Armenian Premier League | 1 | 0 | — | | — | | 1 | 0 |
| Pyunik | 2022–23 | Armenian Premier League | 2 | 0 | 0 | 0 | 0 | 0 | 2 | 0 |
| Pyunik | 2025–26 | Armenian Premier League | 24 | 0 | 3 | 1 | 1 (Note: Appearances in UEFA Conference League) | 0 | 28 | 1 |
| Pyunik | 2026–27 | Armenian Premier League | 3 | 1 | — | | 4 | 0 | 7 | 1 |
| Pyunik | Total | | 30 | 1 | 3 | 1 | 5 | 0 | 38 | 2 |
| BKMA Yerevan (loan) | 2023–24 | Armenian Premier League | 23 | 0 | 1 | 1 | — | | 24 | 1 |
| BKMA Yerevan (loan) | 2024–25 | Armenian Premier League | 27 | 2 | 2 | 1 | — | | 29 | 3 |
| BKMA Yerevan (loan) | Total | | 50 | 2 | 3 | 2 | 0 | 0 | 53 | 4 |
| BKMA Yerevan-2 (loan) | 2023–24 | Armenian First League | 9 | 1 | — | | — | | 9 | 1 |
| Akron Tolyatti | 2026–27 | Russian Premier League | 8 | 1 | 1 | 0 | — | | 9 | 1 |
| Career total | | | 134 | 7 | 7 | 3 | 5 | 0 | 146 | 10 |

=== International ===
As of 15 November 2026

Armenia
| Year | Apps | Goals |
|---|---|---|
| 2026 | 8 | 0 |
| Total | 8 | 0 |

== Honours ==
Pyunik

- Armenian Premier League: 2021–22
