= Mikhail Kovalenko =

Russian footballer

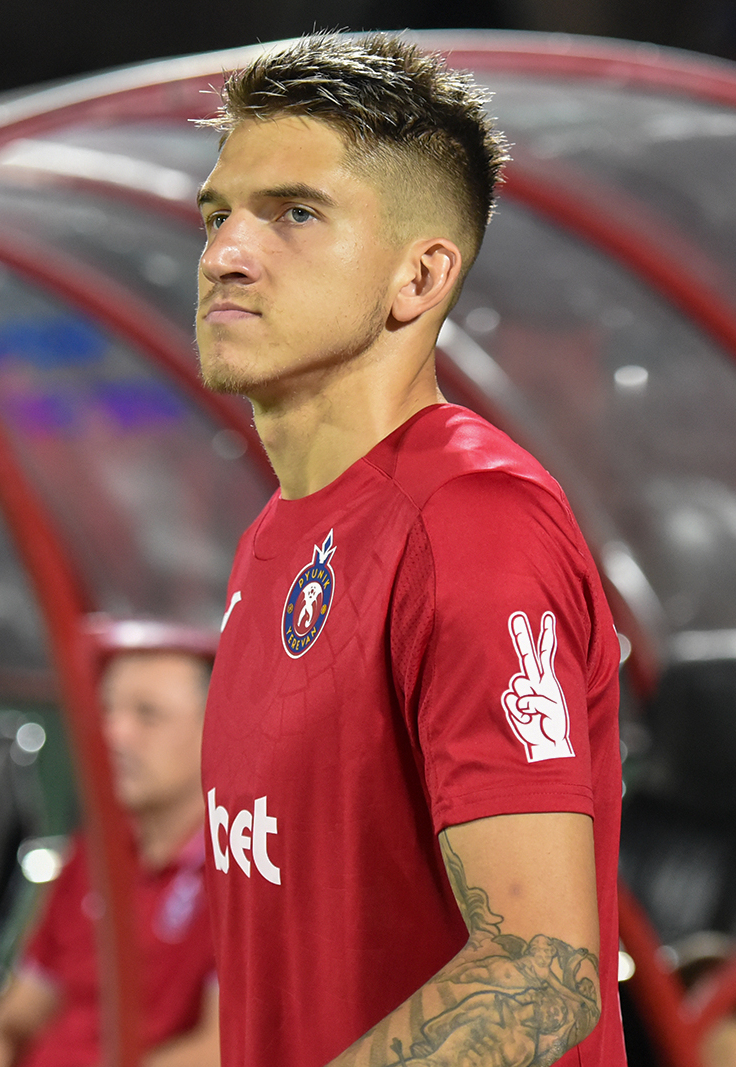
- Kovalenko with Pyunik in 2022

Personal information
- Full name: Mikhail Vadimovich Kovalenko
- Date of birth: 25 January 1995 (age 31)
- Place of birth: Saint Petersburg, Russia
- Height: 1.81 m (5 ft 11 1/2 in)
- Position: Defender

Team information
- Current team: Pyunik
- Number: 15

Youth career
- –2013: Zenit St.Petersburg

Senior career*
Years	Team	Apps	(Gls)
2014–2015	Zenit-2 St.Petersburg	0	(0)
2015–2018	Dynamo St.Petersburg	62	(2)
2017–2018	→ Dynamo-2 St.Petersburg	8	(1)
2018	Sochi	1	(0)
2018–2019	Tyumen	23	(0)
2019–2021	Noah	14	(2)
2022	Olimp-Dolgoprudny	12	(0)
2022–	Pyunik	100	(8)
- * Club domestic league appearances and goals as of 18 June 2026

Mikhail Vadimovich Kovalenko (Russian: Михаил Вадимович Коваленко; born 25 January 1995) is a Russian professional footballer who plays as a defender for Armenian Premier League club Pyunik.

== Club career ==
Kovalenko made his debut in the Russian Professional Football League for FC Dynamo Saint Petersburg on 20 July 2015 in a game against FC Khimki. He made his Russian Football National League debut for Dynamo Saint Petersburg on 19 August 2017 in a game against FC Tom Tomsk.

== Honours ==
Pyunik

- Armenian Premier League: 2023–24

Noah

- Armenian Cup: 2019–20
