= Daniyel Agbalyan =

Armenian footballer (born 1999)

Personal information
- Full name: Daniyel Melikovich Agbalyan
- Date of birth: 12 March 1999 (age 27)
- Place of birth: Stary Oskol, Russia
- Height: 1.72 m (5 ft 8 in)
- Position: Central midfielder

Team information
- Current team: Alashkert
- Number: 77

Senior career*
Years	Team	Apps	(Gls)
2019–2021	Pyunik	4	(0)
2019	→ FC Ani Yerevan (loan)	7	(1)
2020–2021	→ Pyunik-2 (loan)	30	(4)
2021–2025	BKMA Yerevan	123	(12)
2025–2026	Pyunik	15	(0)
2026–	Alashkert	4	(0)

International career^{‡}
2025–	Armenia	1	(0)
- * Club domestic league appearances and goals as of 28 August 2026 ‡ National team caps and goals as of 9 June 2025

Daniyel Melikovich Agbalyan (Armenian: Դանիել Աղբալյան; Russian: Даниел Меликович Агбалян; born 12 March 1999) is a professional footballer who plays as a central midfielder for Armenian Premier League club Alashkert. Born in Russia, he plays for the Armenia national football team.

== Club career ==
Agbalyan started playing football in the junior team of the local club Metallurg-Oskol. Later, he played for Russian amateur teams such as Metallurg-OEMK (Stary Oskol) and FC Olimpik (Novaya Usman).

At 9 June 2020, Agbalyan made his debut for Pyunik in the Armenian Premier League in a game against Urartu.

At June 2021 Agbalyan left Pyunik and joined BKMA in July of the same year.

On 23 June 2025, Agbalyan rejoined Pyunik.

== International career ==
In May 2025, he received his first call-up to the Armenia national team for a friendly matches against Kosovo and Montenegro.

Agbalyan made his debut for the Armenia national team on 6 June 2025 in a friendly match against the Montenegro.

== Career statistics ==
=== International ===
As of 9 June 2025

Armenia
Year	Apps	Goals
2025	1	0
Total	1	0
