= Javi Moreno (footballer, born 1997) =

Spanish footballer

Personal information
- Full name: Javier Moreno Sánchez
- Date of birth: 20 June 1997 (age 29)
- Place of birth: Almería, Spain
- Height: 1.75 m (5 ft 9 in)
- Position: Winger

Team information
- Current team: Pyunik
- Number: 10

Youth career
- 2010–2011: Oriente
- 2011–2012: Los Molinos
- 2012–2014: La Cañada
- 2014–2015: Los Molinos
- 2015–2016: Almería

Senior career*
Years	Team	Apps	(Gls)
2014–2015	Los Molinos	3	(0)
2015–2019	Almería B	69	(5)
2019–2021	UCAM Murcia	38	(4)
2021–2022	ŁKS Łódź	31	(0)
2022	ŁKS Łódź II	9	(4)
2023	UCAM Murcia	20	(2)
2023	Atlético Baleares	9	(0)
2024–2025	Hércules	52	(7)
2025–	Pyunik	27	(5)
- * Club domestic league appearances and goals as of 18 June 2026

Javier "Javi" Moreno Sánchez (born 20 June 1997) is a Spanish professional footballer who plays as a left winger for Armenian Premier League club Pyunik.

== Club career ==
Born in Almería, Andalusia, Moreno started his career with CD Oriente, and subsequently represented Los Molinos CF and La Cañada Atlético CF. In July 2014 he returned to Los Molinos, and made his first-team debut on 23 August by starting in a 0–1 Tercera División home loss against UD San Pedro.

In January 2015, after three appearances with the main squad, Moreno signed for UD Almería and returned to youth football. He first appeared with the reserves on 20 December 2015, coming on as a half-time substitute for Kiu in a 1–3 away loss against Real Betis B in the Segunda División B.

On 28 August 2016 Moreno scored his first senior goal, netting his team's second in a 4–1 home routing of CD Alhaurino. The following 29 March, he suffered a serious knee injury and remained sidelined for seven months.

On 21 August 2019, Moreno signed for UCAM Murcia CF in the third level. On 8 June 2021, he moved abroad for the first time in his career after agreeing to a contract with Polish I liga side ŁKS Łódź.

On 26 June 2025, Moreno signed a contract with Pyunik.
