= Gevorg Tarakhchyan =

Armenian footballer

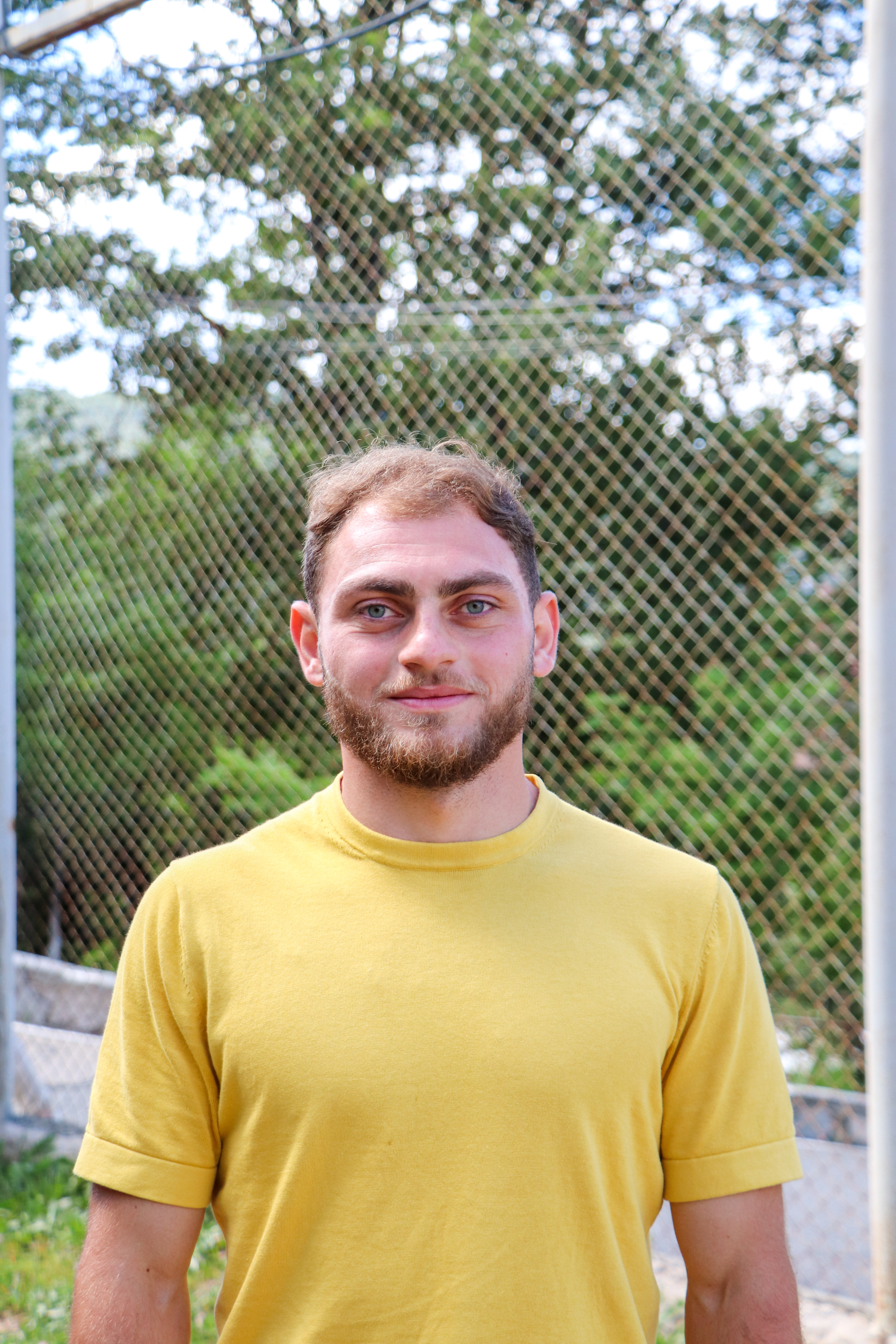
- Tarakhchyan in 2023

Personal information
- Date of birth: 15 March 2002 (age 24)
- Place of birth: Yerevan, Armenia
- Height: 1.70 m (5 ft 7 in)
- Position: Left winger

Team information
- Current team: Pyunik
- Number: 8

Youth career
- Banants

Senior career*
Years	Team	Apps	(Gls)
2018–2021	Banants II	28	(7)
2020–2021	Urartu	20	(0)
2021	Sevan	9	(1)
2022	Noah	9	(0)
2022–2023	BKMA Yerevan	41	(6)
2023–2024	Urartu	29	(2)
2025	Alashkert	12	(0)
2025–	Pyunik	23	(3)

International career^{‡}
2018	Armenia U16	2	(1)
2018	Armenia U17	5	(0)
2019	Armenia U18	5	(0)
2019	Armenia U19	4	(1)
2020–2024	Armenia U21	17	(1)
2024–	Armenia	1	(0)
- * Club domestic league appearances and goals as of 18 June 2026 ‡ National team caps and goals as of 4 June 2024

Gevorg Tarakhchyan (Armenian: Գևորգ Տարախչյան; born 15 March 2002) is an Armenian football player who plays as a left winger for Pyunik and the Armenia national team.

== International career ==
Tarakhchyan made his debut for the Armenia national team on 4 June 2024 in a friendly against Slovenia.
