= 2026–27 FC Alashkert season =

Alashkert
2026–27 season
- Chairman: Bagrat Navoyan
- Manager: Vahe Gevorgyan
- Stadium: Alashkert Stadium
- Premier League: 4th
- Armenian Cup: Quarter-final
- UEFA Conference League: Second Qualifying Round vs CFR Cluj
- Top goalscorer: League: Domi Massoumou (9); All: Domi Massoumou (9)
Home colours	Away colours

The 2026–27 season was Alashkert's fifteenth season in the Armenian Premier League and twentieth overall.

== Season overview ==
On 9 June, Alashkert announced the signing of Hakob Hakobyan from Ararat-Armenia.

On 13 June, Alashkert announced the signing of Cézar, who'd most recently played for Şamaxı in the Azerbaijan Premier League.

On 15 June, Alashkert announced the signing of Philip Ejike from Montana.

On 21 June, Alashkert announced the signing of Domi Massoumou, who'd most recently played for Qabala in the Azerbaijan Premier League.

On 23 June, Alashkert announced the signing of Daouda Togola from FDC Vista.

On 8 July, Alashkert announced the signing of Hussein Muiz Adebayo from FDC Vista, and the signing of Daniyel Agbalyan from Pyunik.

On 24 July, Juan Campos left Alashkert to join Al Wasl on loan for the season.

== Squad ==
As of match played 6 November 2026

Number	Name	Nationality	Position	Date of birth (age)	Signed from	Signed in	Contract ends	Apps.	Goals
Goalkeepers
1	Vlad Chatunts	(Armenia)	GK	19 September 2002 (age 24)	Lernayin Artsakh	2026		1	0
24	Arsen Beglaryan	(Armenia)	GK	18 February 1993 (age 33)	Van	2025		86	0
31	Daniil Polyansky	(Russia)	GK	18 February 2001 (age 25)	Unattached	2026		0	0
99	Ibrahim Sesay	(Sierra Leone)	GK	18 October 2004 (age 22)	Bo Rangers	2025		2	0
Defenders
3	Cézar	(Brazil)	DF	22 January 2000 (age 26)	Şamaxı	2026		17	1
4	Yaroslav Matyukhin	(Russia)	DF	19 September 2005 (age 21)	Van	2025		39	1
5	Davit Terteryan	(Armenia)	DF	17 December 1997 (age 28)	Van	2025		40	2
8	Edgar Piloyan	(Armenia)	DF	7 November 2004 (age 22)	Botev Plovdiv	2025		44	3
15	Arsen Sadoyan	(Armenia)	DF	16 March 1999 (age 27)	Van	2025		37	0
22	Robert Hakobyan	(Armenia)	DF	22 October 1996 (age 30)	Van	2025		31	1
23	Stepan Gigolyan	(Armenia)	DF	20 January 2006 (age 20)	Sochi	2026		4	0
55	Hakob Hakobyan	(Armenia)	DF	29 March 1997 (age 29)	Ararat-Armenia	2026		18	1
Midfielders
6	Hussein Muiz Adebayo	(Nigeria)	DF	7 July 2008 (age 18)	FDC Vista	2026		7	1
7	Karen Nalbandyan	(Armenia)	MF	14 April 2002 (age 24)	Van	2025		89	28
17	Joseph Banda	(Zambia)	MF	17 December 2005 (age 20)	Hapoel Be'er Sheva	2026		25	2
18	Ifeanyi Nduka	(Nigeria)	MF	2 December 2003 (age 22)	Krasnodar	2025		28	0
20	Daouda Togola	(Mali)	MF	2 April 2008 (age 18)	FDC Vista	2026		12	3
77	Daniyel Agbalyan	(Armenia)	MF	21 March 1999 (age 27)	Pyunik	2026		8	0
88	Rafael Jesus	(Brazil)	MF	31 May 2007 (age 19)	Sport Recife	2026		30	2
Forwards
10	Olawale Farayola	(Nigeria)	FW	10 October 2002 (age 24)	Van	2025		43	4
11	Momo Touré	(Guinea)	FW	12 January 2002 (age 24)	Van	2025		45	15
14	Domi Massoumou	(Republic of the Congo)	FW	4 June 2003 (age 23)	Qabala	2026		18	9
16	Isah Buhari	(Nigeria)	FW	22 March 2007 (age 19)	FDC Vista	2025		1	0
19	Philip Ejike	(Nigeria)	FW	18 April 2002 (age 24)	Montana	2026		14	3
21	Jefferson Granado	(Colombia)	FW	9 April 2003 (age 23)	Van	2026		20	1
	Obi Chima	(Nigeria)	FW	7 March 2007 (age 19)	FDC Vista	2025		8	0
Away on loan
9	Ahmad Khalil Sammani	(Nigeria)	FW	20 January 2008 (age 18)	Mailantarki Care	2026		10	0
28	Usman Ajibona	(Nigeria)	FW	23 February 2007 (age 19)	Van	2025		0	0
77	Juan Campos	(Venezuela)	MF	26 July 2007 (age 19)	Nueva Esparta	2025		8	1
Left during the season

== Transfers ==
=== In ===
Date	Position	Nationality	Name	From	Fee	Ref.
9 June 2026	DF	(Armenia)	Hakob Hakobyan	Ararat-Armenia	Free	
13 June 2026	DF	(Brazil)	Cézar	Şamaxı	Undisclosed	
15 June 2026	FW	(Nigeria)	Philip Ejike	Montana	Undisclosed	
21 June 2026	FW	(Republic of the Congo)	Domi Massoumou	Qabala	Undisclosed	
23 June 2026	MF	(Mali)	Daouda Togola	FDC Vista	Undisclosed	
8 July 2026	MF	(Nigeria)	Hussein Muiz Adebayo	FDC Vista	Undisclosed	
8 July 2026	MF	(Armenia)	Daniyel Agbalyan	Pyunik	Undisclosed	
1 October 2026	GK	(Russia)	Daniil Polyansky	Unattached	Free	

=== Loans out ===
Date from	Position	Nationality	Name	To	Date to	Ref.
11 July 2026	FW	(Nigeria)	Usman Ajibona	Torpedo Moscow	30 June 2027	
24 July 2026	MF	(Venezuela)	Juan Campos	Al Wasl	30 June 2027	
27 August 2026	FW	(Nigeria)	Khalil Ahmad Sammani	Van	30 June 2027	

== Friendlies ==
24 June 2026	OFK Beograd	2–4	Alashkert	Serbia
(UTC+4)	Goal	Report	Jesus; Massoumou; Ejike

27 June 2026	Spartak Subotica	4–3	Alashkert	Serbia
(UTC+4)	Goal	Report	Touré; Sammani

30 June 2026	Alashkert	0–1	Maccabi Tel Aviv	Serbia
(UTC+4)		Report

1 July 2026	Alashkert	2–0	Loznica	Serbia
(UTC+4)	(o.g.); Ejike	Report

26 September 2026	Alashkert	1–2	Van
(UTC+4)		Report

3 October 2026	Alashkert	3–0	Sardarapat
(UTC+4)		Report

15 November 2026	Alashkert	2–2	Andranik
(UTC+4)		Report

== Competitions ==
=== Overview ===
Competition	First match	Last match	Starting round	Final position	Record							
Competition	First match	Last match	Starting round	Final position	Pld	W	D	L	GF	GA	GD	Win %
Premier League	3 August 2026		Matchday 1		13	7	4	2	28	12	+16	53.85
Armenian Cup	28 October 2026		Round of 16		1	1	0	0	4	0	+4	100.00
Conference League	9 July 2026	30 July 2026	First qualifying round	Second qualifying round	4	0	3	1	4	7	−3	0.00
Total					18	8	7	3	36	19	+17	44.44

Last updated: 6 November 2026
Source: Competitions

=== Premier League ===
==== Results summary ====
Overall								Home						Away					
Pld	W	D	L	GF	GA	GD	Pts	W	D	L	GF	GA	GD	W	D	L	GF	GA	GD
13	7	4	2	28	12	+16	25	5	1	0	21	4	+17	2	3	2	7	8	−1

Last updated: 6 November 2026.
Source: See Results

==== Results by round ====
Round	1	2	3	4	5	6	7	8	9	10	11	12	13
Ground	H	H	A	H	A	H	A	H	A	H	A	A	A
Result	W	W	L	W	D	W	D	D	D	W	W	W	L
Position	2	1	3	3	2	2	4	4	4	4	4	4	4

Updated to match(es) played on 7 November 2026. Source: See Results
A = Away; H = Home; W = Win; D = Draw; L = Loss; P = Bye

==== Results ====
3 August 2026 1	Alashkert	3–0	Ararat Yerevan	Yerevan
20:00 (UTC+4)	Ejike (yellow card) 35'; Nalbandyan 54' (pen.); Rafael (yellow card) 72'; Massoumou 75', 78'; Agbalyan (yellow card) 90'	Report	Chukwu (yellow card) 24'; Fofana (yellow card) 31'; Berte (yellow card) 53'; Khachumyan (yellow card) 90+3'	Stadium: Academy Stadium; Referee: Yura Mahtesyan

10 August 2026 2	Alashkert	3–0	BKMA Yerevan	Yerevan
20:00 (UTC+4)	Farayola 3'; Nalbandyan 15'; H.Hakobyan 90+2'	Report		Stadium: Academy Stadium; Referee: Sargis Khachatryan

17 August 2026 3	Noah	1–0	Alashkert	Abovyan
20:00 (UTC+4)	Muradyan (yellow card) 25'; Sualehe (yellow card) 53'; Lazetić 60'; Oshima (yellow card) 70'; Khamoyan (yellow card) 90+1'	Report	Cézar (yellow card) 35'; Massoumou (yellow card) 38'; Terteryan (yellow card) 81'	Stadium: Vahagn Tumasyan Stadium; Referee: Artem Gasparyan

21 August 2026 4	Alashkert	3–0	Gandzasar	Armavir
16:00 (UTC+4)	Cézar 28'; Nalbandyan 53'; Terteryan (yellow card) 73'; Piloyan 74'	Report	Asatryan (yellow card) 41'; Mani (yellow card) 43'	Stadium: Hakob Tonoyan Stadium; Referee: Tiran Yeritsyan

28 August 2026 5	Urartu	1–1	Alashkert	Yerevan
20:00 (UTC+4)	Rajani 14' (yellow card) 78'; Veremeev (yellow card) 45+1'	Report	Touré (yellow card) 48' (goal) 80'; Terteryan (yellow card) 78'; Banda (yellow card) 90+2'	Stadium: Urartu Stadium; Referee: Zaven Hovhannisyan

3 September 2026 6	Alashkert	4–0	Van	Yerevan
20:00 (UTC+4)	Massoumou 8', 39', 62'; Rafael (yellow card) 70'; Matyukhin (yellow card) 80'; Ejike 90+4'	Report	Boukari (yellow card) 79'	Stadium: Academy Stadium; Referee: Vardan Vardumyan

13 September 2026 7	Sardarapat	1–1	Alashkert	Armavir
16:00 (UTC+4)	Kochkanyan 27'	Report	Touré (yellow card) 30'; Terteryan (yellow card) 36'; Sarkissian 50' (o.g.)	Stadium: Hakob Tonoyan Stadium; Referee: Sargis Khachatryan

19 September 2026 8	Alashkert	3–3	Pyunik	Armavir
16:00 (UTC+4)	Hakobyan (yellow card) 35'; Farayola (yellow card) 37'; Adebayo 43'; Nalbandyan 75' (pen.); Massoumou 84'	Report	Pikis 5', 90+6'; Witi 21'; Vakulenko (yellow card) 29'; Tarakhchyan (yellow card) 53'; Santos (yellow card) 65'; Simonyan (yellow card) 73'	Stadium: Hakob Tonoyan Stadium; Referee: Vardan Manukyan

10 October 2026 9	Ararat-Armenia	1–1	Alashkert	Abovyan
19:00 (UTC+4)	Banjaqui (yellow card) 10'; Serobyan 27' (yellow card) 58'; Lima (yellow card) 90'	Report	Terteryan (yellow card) 6'; Massoumou 33'; Cézar (yellow card) 47'; Piloyan (yellow card) 50'; Sadoyan (yellow card) 90'	Stadium: Vahagn Tumasyan Stadium; Referee: Zaven Hovhannisyan

16 October 2026 10	Alashkert	5–1	Syunik	Yerevan
17:00 (UTC+4)	Cézar (yellow card) 8'; Nalbandyan 29', 68'; Massoumou 37'; Touré 45'; Ejike 85'	Report	Soghomonyan (yellow card) 4'; Godswill Odinakachi (yellow card) 23'; Souassi (yellow card) 28'; Karapetyan (yellow card) 75'; Enning 86'; Silva (yellow card) 90+1'	Stadium: Academy Stadium; Referee: Hovhannes Kalantaryan

24 October 2026 11	Shirak	0–1	Alashkert	Gyumri
19:00 (UTC+4)	Tarloyan (yellow card) 45+4'; Kodia (yellow card) 67'	Report	Rafael (yellow card) 44'; Ejike 86'; Piloyan (yellow card) 90'	Stadium: City Stadium; Referee: Yura Mahtesyan

31 October 2026 12	Ararat Yerevan	0–2	Alashkert	Yerevan
20:00 (UTC+4)	Handzongo (yellow card) 51'; Haroyan (yellow card) 53'; Anzimati (yellow card) 58'; Chukwu (yellow card) 61'	Report	Rafael 63'; Massoumou 90+3'; Piloyan (yellow card) 90+5'	Stadium: Republican Stadium; Referee: Henrik Nalbandian

6 November 2026 13	BKMA Yerevan	1–4	Alashkert	Yerevan
19:00 (UTC+4)	Sargsyan 26', 56'; Askaryan (yellow card) 30'; Harutyunyan 59'; Davtyan 90+5' (pen.)	Report	Touré 17'; Matyukhin (yellow card) 86'	Stadium: Academy Stadium; Referee: Artem Gasparyan

22 November 2026 14	Alashkert	–	Noah	Yerevan
20:00 (UTC+4)		Report		Stadium: Academy Stadium

==== League table ====
Pos	Team	Pld	W	D	L	GF	GA	GD	Pts	Qualification or relegation
1	Noah	13	11	1	1	32	10	+22	34	Qualification for the Champions League first qualifying round
2	Pyunik	13	9	4	0	31	9	+22	31	Qualification for the Conference League second qualifying round
3	Ararat-Armenia	12	9	2	1	24	10	+14	29	Qualification for the Conference League first qualifying round
4	Alashkert	13	7	4	2	28	12	+16	25	
5	Sardarapat	13	5	5	3	20	20	0	20	
6	Urartu	12	4	4	4	19	15	+4	16	
7	Shirak	13	4	2	7	14	16	−2	14	
8	Van	13	3	2	8	12	32	−20	11	
9	Ararat Yerevan	13	3	2	8	10	21	−11	11	
10	Syunik	13	3	2	8	13	27	−14	11	
11	BKMA	13	3	2	8	14	23	−9	11	
12	Gandzasar Kapan	13	1	0	12	10	32	−22	3	Relegation to the Armenian First League

Updated to match(es) played on 8 November 2026. Source: FFA
Rules for classification: 1) Points; 2) Head-to-head points; 3) Head-to-head goal difference; 4) Head-to-head goals scored; 5) Matches won; 6) Goal difference; 7) Less red cards; 8) Less yellow cards ; 9) Fair-play ranking 10) Draw

=== Armenian Cup ===
28 October 2026 Round of 16	Alashkert	4–0	BKMA Yerevan	Yerevan
18:00 (UTC+4)	Togola 24', 33', 60'; Banda 38'; Adebayo (yellow card) 65'	Report	Yedigaryan (yellow card) 23'	Stadium: Academy Stadium; Referee: Zaven Hovhannisyan

Quarter-final	–
(UTC+4)

=== UEFA Conference League ===
==== Qualifying rounds ====
9 July 2026 First qualifying round 1st leg	Alashkert (Armenia)	1–1	(Kazakhstan) Yelimay	Yerevan, Armenia
20:00 (UTC+4)	Piloyan (yellow card) 45+4'; Nalbandyan (yellow card) 45+4'; Terteryan 86'	Report	Tanasijević (yellow card) 45+4'; Bakhtiyarov (yellow card) 55'; Ashirbek 60'; Ilić (yellow card) 72'; Payruz (yellow card) 90+11'	Stadium: Academy Stadium; Attendance: 1,264; Referee: Vlatko Ilioski (North Macedonia)
Note: Alashkert played their home matches at Yerevan Football Academy Stadium instead of their own stadium, Alashkert Stadium, which does not fulfill UEFA requirements.

16 July 2026 First qualifying round 2nd leg	Yelimay (Kazakhstan)	2–2 (a.e.t.) (3–3 agg.) (5–6 p)	(Armenia) Alashkert	Semey, Kazakhstan
19:00 (UTC+4)	Bakhtiyarov 11'; Tyulyubay (yellow card) 37'; Tanasijević (yellow card) 56'; Ilić (yellow card) 86' (goal) 96' (pen.)	Report	Touré 4'; Rafael (yellow card) 73'; Piloyan (yellow card) 80'; Massoumou (yellow card) 110'; Gabriel 120+1' (o.g.)	Stadium: Spartak Stadium; Attendance: 7,900; Referee: Aleko Aptsiauri (Georgia)
	Penalties
	Payruz (penalty scored); Ilić (penalty scored); Belančić (penalty scored); Sviridov (penalty missed); Ashirbek (penalty scored); Murillo (penalty scored); Palacio (penalty missed)		(penalty scored) Piloyan; (penalty scored) Massoumou; (penalty scored) Cézar; (penalty missed) Beglaryan; (penalty scored) Granado; (penalty scored) Togola; (penalty scored) Sadoyan

23 July 2026 Second qualifying round 1st leg	Alashkert (Armenia)	1–1	(Romania) CFR Cluj	Yerevan, Armenia
19:00 (UTC+4)	Banda (yellow card) 29'; Rafael 35'; Nalbandyan (yellow card) 45+2'; Terteryan (yellow card) 84'	Report	Muhar (yellow card) 37'; Pantalon (yellow card) 40'; Sfait 47'; Biliboc (yellow card) 67'	Stadium: Academy Stadium; Attendance: 1,152; Referee: Eldorjan Hamiti (Albania)
Note: Alashkert played their home matches at Yerevan Football Academy Stadium instead of their own stadium, Alashkert Stadium, which does not fulfill UEFA requirements.

30 July 2026 Second qualifying round 2nd leg	CFR Cluj (Romania)	3–0 (4–1 agg.)	(Armenia) Alashkert	Cluj-Napoca, Romania
22:30 (UTC+4)	Muhar 3'; Korenica 45'; Đoković (yellow card) 49'; Fica 77'	Report	Cézar (red card) 12'; Terteryan (yellow card) 80'	Stadium: Stadionul Dr. Constantin Rădulescu; Attendance: 5,465; Referee: Vilhjalmur Thorarinsson (Iceland)

== Squad statistics ==
As of match played 6 November 2026

=== Appearances and goals ===
No.	Pos	Nat	Player	Total		Premier League		Armenian Cup		Conference League	
No.	Pos	Nat	Player	Apps	Goals	Apps	Goals	Apps	Goals	Apps	Goals
3	DF	(Brazil) BRA	Cézar	17	1	13	1	0	0	4	0
4	DF	(Russia) RUS	Yaroslav Matyukhin	18	0	13	0	1	0	4	0
5	DF	(Armenia) ARM	Davit Terteryan	16	1	11+1	0	0	0	3+1	1
6	MF	(Nigeria) NGR	Hussein Muiz Adebayo	7	1	2+2	1	0+1	0	0+2	0
7	MF	(Armenia) ARM	Karen Nalbandyan	17	6	13	6	0	0	4	0
8	DF	(Armenia) ARM	Edgar Piloyan	17	1	13	1	0	0	4	0
10	FW	(Nigeria) NGR	Olawale Farayola	15	1	10+1	1	0	0	4	0
11	FW	(Guinea) GUI	Momo Touré	18	4	11+2	3	1	0	4	1
14	FW	(Republic of the Congo) CGO	Domi Massoumou	18	9	13	9	1	0	1+3	0
15	DF	(Armenia) ARM	Arsen Sadoyan	13	0	1+7	0	1	0	1+3	0
17	MF	(Zambia) ZAM	Joseph Banda	13	1	3+5	0	1	1	3+1	0
18	MF	(Nigeria) NGR	Ifeanyi Nduka	3	0	0+1	0	0+1	0	0+1	0
19	FW	(Nigeria) NGR	Philip Ejike	14	3	2+7	3	0+1	0	0+4	0
20	MF	(Mali) MLI	Daouda Togola	12	3	0+9	0	1	3	0+2	0
21	FW	(Colombia) COL	Jefferson Granado	12	0	0+9	0	0+1	0	0+2	0
22	DF	(Armenia) ARM	Robert Hakobyan	10	0	2+5	0	1	0	1+1	0
23	DF	(Armenia) ARM	Stepan Gigolyan	4	0	0+3	0	1	0	0	0
24	GK	(Armenia) ARM	Arsen Beglaryan	16	0	12	0	0	0	4	0
55	DF	(Armenia) ARM	Hakob Hakobyan	18	1	12+1	1	0+1	0	3+1	0
77	MF	(Armenia) ARM	Daniyel Agbalyan	8	0	0+7	0	1	0	0	0
88	MF	(Brazil) BRA	Rafael Jesus	18	2	11+2	1	1	0	4	1
99	GK	(Sierra Leone) SLE	Ibrahim Sesay	2	0	1	0	1	0	0	0
Players away on loan:
9	FW	(Nigeria) NGR	Ahmad Khalil Sammani	2	0	0+2	0	0	0	0	0
Players who left Ararat-Armenia during the season:

=== Goal scorers ===
Place	Position	Nation	Number	Name	Premier League	Armenian Cup	Conference League	Total
1	FW	(Republic of the Congo)	14	Domi Massoumou	9	0	0	9
2	MF	(Armenia)	7	Karen Nalbandyan	6	0	0	6
3	FW	(Guinea)	11	Momo Touré	3	0	1	4
4	FW	(Nigeria)	19	Philip Ejike	3	0	0	3
4	MF	(Mali)	20	Daouda Togola	0	0	3	3
6	MF	(Brazil)	88	Rafael Jesus	1	0	1	2
6				Own goal	1	0	1	2
8	FW	(Nigeria)	10	Olawale Farayola	1	0	0	1
8	DF	(Armenia)	55	Hakob Hakobyan	1	0	0	1
8	DF	(Brazil)	3	Cézar	1	0	0	1
8	DF	(Armenia)	8	Edgar Piloyan	1	0	0	1
8	MF	(Nigeria)	6	Hussein Muiz Adebayo	1	0	0	1
8	MF	(Zambia)	17	Joseph Banda	0	1	0	1
8	DF	(Armenia)	5	Davit Terteryan	0	0	1	1
				TOTALS	28	4	4	36

=== Clean sheets ===
Place	Position	Nation	Number	Name	Premier League	Armenian Cup	Conference League	Total
1	GK	(Armenia)	24	Arsen Beglaryan	6	0	0	6
2	GK	(Sierra Leone)	99	Ibrahim Sesay	0	1	0	1
				TOTALS	6	1	0	7

=== Disciplinary record ===
Number	Nation	Position	Name	Premier League		Armenian Cup		Conference League		Total	
Number	Nation	Position	Name	Yellow card	Red card	Yellow card	Red card	Yellow card	Red card	Yellow card	Red card
3	(Brazil)	DF	Cézar	3	0	0	0	0	1	3	1
4	(Russia)	DF	Yaroslav Matyukhin	2	0	0	0	0	0	2	0
5	(Armenia)	DF	Davit Terteryan	5	0	0	0	2	0	7	0
6	(Nigeria)	MF	Hussein Muiz Adebayo	0	0	1	0	0	0	1	0
7	(Armenia)	MF	Karen Nalbandyan	0	0	0	0	3	0	3	0
8	(Armenia)	DF	Edgar Piloyan	3	0	0	0	1	0	4	0
10	(Nigeria)	FW	Olawale Farayola	1	0	0	0	0	0	1	0
11	(Guinea)	FW	Momo Touré	2	0	0	0	0	0	2	0
14	(Republic of the Congo)	FW	Domi Massoumou	1	0	0	0	1	0	2	0
15	(Armenia)	DF	Arsen Sadoyan	1	0	0	0	0	0	1	0
17	(Zambia)	MF	Joseph Banda	1	0	0	0	1	0	2	0
19	(Nigeria)	FW	Philip Ejike	1	0	0	0	0	0	1	0
22	(Armenia)	DF	Robert Hakobyan	1	0	0	0	0	0	1	0
77	(Armenia)	MF	Daniyel Agbalyan	1	0	0	0	0	0	1	0
88	(Brazil)	MF	Rafael Jesus	3	0	0	0	1	0	4	0
Players away on loan:
Players who left Alashkert during the season:
			TOTALS	25	0	1	0	9	1	35	1
