= 2025–26 FC Alashkert season =

Alashkert
2025–26 season
- Chairman: Bagrat Navoyan
- Manager: Vahe Gevorgyan
- Stadium: Alashkert Stadium
- Premier League: 4th
- Armenian Cup: Preliminary round
- Top goalscorer: League: Karen Nalbandyan (14); All: Karen Nalbandyan (14)
Home colours	Away colours

The 2025–26 season was Alashkert's fourteenth season in the Armenian Premier League and nineteenth overall.

== Season overview ==
On 30 June, Alashkert announced the signing of Edgar Piloyan from Botev Plovdiv.

On 1 July, Alashkert announced the signing of Isah Buhari and Obi Chima, both from FDC Vista.

On 2 July, Alashkert announced the signing of Kofi Duffour from FDC Vista.

On 4 July, Alashkert announced the signing of Ibrahim Sesay from Bo Rangers.

On 6 July, Alashkert announced the loan signing of Caio Henrique from GO Audax for the season.

On 25 July, Alashkert announced the signing of Ifeanyi Nduka from Krasnodar.

On 27 July, Alashkert announced the signing of Juan Campos from Nueva Esparta.

On 4 August, Alashkert announced the signing of Mher Kankanyan from BKMA Yerevan.

On 6 September, Alashkert announced the departure of Julien Bationo to DAC 1904, and the signing of Samuel Segun from FDC Vista.

On 15 September, Alashkert announced the loan signing of Dennis Mse from International Allies for the season.

On 16 January, Alashkert announced the signing of Vlad Chatunts from Lernayin Artsakh.

On 20 January, Alashkert announced that Dennis Mse had left the club and returned to International Allies.

On 2 February, Alashkert announced the signing of Joseph Sabobo from Hapoel Be'er Sheva.

On 3 February, Alashkert announced the signing of Ahmad Khalil Sammani from Mailantarki Care.

On 4 February, Alashkert announced the signing of Rafael Jesus from Sport Recife.

On 25 February, Alashkert announced the signing of David Kirakosyan from Sochi.

== Squad ==
As of match played 26 May 2026

Number	Name	Nationality	Position	Date of birth (age)	Signed from	Signed in	Contract ends	Apps.	Goals
Goalkeepers
1	Vlad Chatunts	(Armenia)	GK	19 September 2002 (aged 23)	Lernayin Artsakh	2026		1	0
13	Anatoliy Ayvazov	(Armenia)	GK	8 June 1996 (aged 29)	Academy	2025		9	0
24	Arsen Beglaryan	(Armenia)	GK	18 February 1993 (aged 33)	Van	2025		70	0
Defenders
2	Serob Grigoryan	(Armenia)	DF	4 February 1995 (aged 31)	Van	2025		37	1
3	Samuel Segun	(Nigeria)	DF	5 September 2007 (aged 18)	FDC Vista	2025		1	0
4	Yaroslav Matyukhin	(Russia)	DF	19 September 2005 (aged 20)	Van	2025		21	1
5	Davit Terteryan	(Armenia)	DF	17 December 1997 (aged 28)	Van	2025		24	1
6	Edgar Piloyan	(Armenia)	DF	7 November 2004 (aged 21)	Botev Plovdiv	2025		27	2
15	Arsen Sadoyan	(Armenia)	DF	16 March 1999 (aged 27)	Van	2025		24	0
21	Jefferson Granado	(Colombia)	DF	9 April 2003 (aged 23)	Van	2026		8	1
22	Robert Hakobyan	(Armenia)	DF	22 October 1996 (aged 29)	Van	2025		21	1
44	Klaidher Macedo	(Brazil)	DF	18 January 1999 (aged 27)	Van	2025		27	0
66	Mher Kankanyan	(Armenia)	DF	19 March 2004 (aged 22)	BKMA Yerevan	2025		2	0
Midfielders
7	Karen Nalbandyan	(Armenia)	MF	14 April 2002 (aged 24)	Van	2025		72	22
8	Yuri Gareginyan	(Armenia)	MF	4 July 1993 (aged 32)	Van	2025		50	0
17	Joseph Sabobo	(Zambia)	MF	17 December 2005 (aged 20)	Hapoel Be'er Sheva	2026		10	1
18	Ifeanyi Nduka	(Nigeria)	MF	2 December 2003 (aged 22)	Krasnodar	2025		25	0
73	David Kirakosyan	(Russia)	MF	13 July 2006 (aged 19)	Sochi	2026		3	0
77	Juan Campos	(Venezuela)	MF	26 July 2007 (aged 18)	Nueva Esparta	2025		8	1
88	Rafael Jesus	(Brazil)	MF	31 May 2007 (aged 18)	Sport Recife	2026		12	0
Forwards
9	Ahmad Khalil Sammani	(Nigeria)	FW	20 January 2008 (aged 18)	Mailantarki Care	2026		8	0
10	Olawale Farayola	(Nigeria)	FW	10 October 2002 (aged 23)	Van	2025		28	3
11	Momo Touré	(Guinea)	FW	12 January 2002 (aged 24)	Van	2025		27	11
16	Isah Buhari	(Nigeria)	FW	22 March 2007 (aged 19)	FDC Vista	2025		1	0
19	Kajally Drammeh	(The Gambia)	FW	10 October 2003 (aged 22)	Van	2025		18	1
25	Caio Henrique	(Brazil)	FW	12 January 2005 (aged 21)	on loan from GO Audax	2025		25	3
28	Usman Ajibona	(Nigeria)	FW	23 February 2007 (aged 19)	Van	2025		0	0
Away on loan
20	Obi Chima	(Nigeria)	FW	7 March 2007 (aged 19)	FDC Vista	2025		8	0
99	Ibrahim Sesay	(Sierra Leone)	GK	18 October 2004 (aged 21)	Bo Rangers	2025		0	0
	Yuri Martirosyan	(Armenia)	DF	8 June 2003 (aged 22)	West Armenia	2024		28	0
	Kofi Duffour	(Ghana)	MF	26 April 2007 (aged 19)	FDC Vista	2025		0	0
Left during the season
27	Julien Bationo	(Ivory Coast)	DF	10 December 2005 (aged 20)	Van	2025		4	1
30	Dennis Mse	(Nigeria)	MF	10 January 2007 (aged 19)	on loan from International Allies	2025		2	0
45	Malik Odeyinka	(Nigeria)	FW	1 May 2006 (aged 20)	Botev Plovdiv	2025		13	0

== Transfers ==
=== In ===
Date	Position	Nationality	Name	From	Fee	Ref.
30 June 2025	DF	(Armenia)	Edgar Piloyan	Botev Plovdiv	Undisclosed	
1 July 2025	FW	(Nigeria)	Isah Buhari	FDC Vista	Undisclosed	
1 July 2025	FW	(Nigeria)	Obi Chima	FDC Vista	Undisclosed	
2 July 2025	MF	(Ghana)	Kofi Duffour	FDC Vista	Undisclosed	
4 July 2025	GK	(Sierra Leone)	Ibrahim Sesay	Bo Rangers	Undisclosed	
25 July 2025	MF	(Nigeria)	Ifeanyi Nduka	Krasnodar	Undisclosed	
27 July 2025	MF	(Venezuela)	Juan Campos	Nueva Esparta	Undisclosed	
4 August 2025	DF	(Armenia)	Mher Kankanyan	BKMA Yerevan	Undisclosed	
6 September 2025	DF	(Nigeria)	Samuel Segun	FDC Vista	Undisclosed	
16 January 2026	GK	(Armenia)	Vlad Chatunts	Lernayin Artsakh	Undisclosed	
2 February 2026	MF	(Zambia)	Joseph Sabobo	Hapoel Be'er Sheva	Undisclosed	
3 February 2026	FW	(Nigeria)	Ahmad Khalil Sammani	Mailantarki Care	Undisclosed	
4 February 2026	MF	(Brazil)	Rafael Jesus	Sport Recife	Undisclosed	
25 February 2026	MF	(Russia)	David Kirakosyan	Sochi	Undisclosed	
13 February 2026	DF	(Colombia)	Jefferson Granado	Van	Undisclosed	

=== Loans in ===
Date from	Position	Nationality	Name	From	Date to	Ref.
6 July 2025	FW	(Brazil)	Caio Henrique	GO Audax	End of season	
15 September 2025	MF	(Nigeria)	Dennis Mse	International Allies	20 January 2026	

=== Out ===
Date from	Position	Nationality	Name	To	Fee	Ref.
1 August 2025	FW	(Armenia)	Levon Vardanyan	Sardarapat	Undisclosed	
6 September 2025	MF	(Ivory Coast)	Julien Bationo	DAC 1904	Undisclosed	
6 February 2026	FW	(Nigeria)	Malik Odeyinka	Elbasani	Undisclosed	

=== Loans out ===
Date from	Position	Nationality	Name	To	Date to	Ref.
29 August 2025	DF	(Armenia)	Yuri Martirosyan	Gandzasar Kapan	End of season	
3 March 2026	GK	(Sierra Leone)	Ibrahim Sesay	Andranik	End of season	
3 March 2026	FW	(Nigeria)	Obi Chima	Andranik	End of season	

=== Released ===
Date	Position	Nationality	Name	Joined	Date	Ref
9 June 2025	FW	(Armenia)	Gevorg Tarakhchyan	Pyunik	9 June 2025	
12 June 2025	FW	(Armenia)	Sargis Metoyan			
24 June 2025	GK	(Armenia)	Gor Manukyan	Van	27 July 2025	
24 June 2025	GK	(Italy)	Valerio Vimercati			
24 June 2025	DF	(Armenia)	Arsen Galstyan	Van		
24 June 2025	DF	(Armenia)	Arman Khachatryan	Gandzasar Kapan		
24 June 2025	DF	(Armenia)	Armen Manucharyan	Lernayin Artsakh	5 August 2025	
24 June 2025	DF	(Armenia)	Robert Navoyan			
24 June 2025	DF	(France)	Hayk Musakhanyan	BATE Borisov		
24 June 2025	MF	(Armenia)	Narek Manukyan	Van	2 August 2025	
24 June 2025	MF	(Armenia)	Petros Avetisyan	Gandzasar Kapan		
24 June 2025	MF	(Ghana)	Annan Mensah	Gandzasar Kapan		
24 June 2025	MF	(Armenia)	Michael Ayvazyan			
24 June 2025	MF	(Armenia)	Rumyan Hovsepyan	Lernayin Artsakh	5 August 2025	
24 June 2025	MF	(Armenia)	Robert Potinyan	Sardarapat		
24 June 2025	MF	(Nigeria)	Haggai Katoh	Gandzasar Kapan		
24 June 2025	FW	(Armenia)	Armen Hovhannisyan	Syunik		
24 June 2025	FW	(Bosnia and Herzegovina)	Aleksandar Glišić	Hayk		
24 June 2025	FW	(Greece)	Christos Kountouriotis	Kavala	9 August 2025	
24 June 2025	FW	(Russia)	Pavel Kireyenko	Sokol Saratov	23 June 2025	

== Friendlies ==
30 January 2026	Alashkert	2–0	Dobrudzha Dobrich	Antalya, Turkey
(UTC+4)	Campos; Touré	Report

2 February 2026	Alashkert	3–0	Vardar	Antalya, Turkey
(UTC+4)	Gareginyan; Trialist; Touré	Report

5 February 2026	Alashkert	0–0	Kaisar	Antalya, Turkey
16:00 (UTC+4)		Report

9 February 2026	Alashkert	1–3	Samgurali Tskaltubo	Antalya, Turkey
(UTC+4)	Goal	Report	Goal

9 February 2026	Alashkert	1–2	Ordabasy	Antalya, Turkey
(UTC+4)	Matyukhin	Report	Goal

13 February 2026	Orenburg	2–1	Alashkert	Antalya, Turkey
11:00 (UTC+4)		Report

13 February 2026	Alashkert	3–2	Surkhon	Antalya, Turkey
17:00 (UTC+4)		Report

20 February 2026	Gandzasar Kapan	1–0	Alashkert	Yerevan
12:00 (UTC+4)		Report		Stadium: Junior Stadium

== Competitions ==
=== Overview ===
Competition	First match	Last match	Starting round	Final position	Record							
Competition	First match	Last match	Starting round	Final position	Pld	W	D	L	GF	GA	GD	Win %
Premier League	4 August 2025	26 May 2026	Matchday 1		27	16	5	6	42	23	+19	59.26
Armenian Cup	17 September 2025	17 September 2025	Preliminary round	Preliminary round	1	0	0	1	1	2	−1	0.00
Total					28	16	5	7	43	25	+18	57.14

Last updated: 26 May 2026
Source: Competitions

=== Premier League ===
==== Results summary ====
Overall								Home						Away					
Pld	W	D	L	GF	GA	GD	Pts	W	D	L	GF	GA	GD	W	D	L	GF	GA	GD
27	16	5	6	42	23	+19	53	9	2	3	21	8	+13	7	3	3	21	15	+6

Last updated: 26 May 2026.
Source: See Results

==== Results by round ====
Round	1	3	4	5	6	7	2	8	9	10	11	12	13	14	15	17	18	19	20	16	21	22	23	24	25	26	27
Ground	H	H	A	H	A	H	A	A	H	A	H	A	H	A	H	H	A	H	A	A	H	A	H	A	H	A	H
Result	L	W	W	W	W	W	L	W	D	W	W	L	W	D	L	W	L	L	D	W	W	W	D	D	W	W	W
Position	9	7	9	5	3	1	1	1	1	1	1	1	1	2	4	3	4	5	5	4	4	3	4	4	5	4	4

Updated to match(es) played on 27 May 2026. Source: See Results
A = Away; H = Home; W = Win; D = Draw; L = Loss; P = Bye

==== Results ====
4 August 2025 1	Alashkert	1–2	Pyunik	Abovyan
17:30 (UTC+4)	Bationo (yellow card) 35' (goal) 41'; Sadoyan (yellow card) 56'	Report	Bationo 46' (o.g.); Ocansey (yellow card) 58'; Kulikov 78'	Stadium: Vahagn Tumasyan Stadium; Referee: Zaven Hovhannisyan

16 August 2025 3	Alashkert	3–0	Ararat Yerevan	Armavir
17:00 (UTC+4)	Nalbandyan 5', 45+3'; Drammeh (yellow card) 63'; Touré 70' (pen.)	Report	Moustapha (red card) 11'; Khachumyan (yellow card) 37'; Kante (yellow card) 47' (yellow-red card) 79'	Stadium: Hakob Tonoyan Stadium; Referee: Ashot Ghaltakhchyan

22 August 2025 4	Urartu	0–1	Alashkert	Yerevan
20:00 (UTC+4)	Agasaryan (yellow card) 14'; Tsymbalyuk (yellow card) 59'	Report	Nalbandyan (yellow card) 28'; Piloyan 58'; Klaidher (yellow card) 79'	Stadium: Urartu Stadium; Referee: Henrik Nalbandian

31 August 2025 5	Alashkert	2–0	Noah	Armavir
16:00 (UTC+4)	Farayola 11'; Touré 41'; Nalbandyan (yellow card) 73'; Nduka (yellow card) 90+7'	Report	Manvelyan (yellow card) 23'; Þórarinsson (yellow card) 35'; Zolotić (yellow card) 80'	Stadium: Hakob Tonoyan Stadium; Referee: Zaven Hovhannisyan

13 September 2025 6	BKMA Yerevan	1–3	Alashkert	Yerevan
18:00 (UTC+4)	Janoyan (yellow card) 23'; Ayvazyan (yellow card) 49'; Petrosyan (yellow card) 72'; N.Hovhannisyan 88' (pen.)	Report	Henrique 8'; Touré 27'; Nalbandyan 65' (pen.); Terteryan (yellow card) 86'	Stadium: Yerevan Football Academy Stadium; Referee: Ashot Harutyunyan

21 September 2025 7	Alashkert	2–0	Gandzasar Kapan	Armavir
16:00 (UTC+4)	Nalbandyan 15'; Piloyan 78'	Report	Karagulyan (yellow card) 26'; Voskanyan (yellow card) 70'; Mani (yellow card) 73'; Mensah (yellow card) 86'	Stadium: Hakob Tonoyan Stadium; Referee: Yura Mahtesyan

25 September 2025 2	Ararat-Armenia	2–1	Alashkert	Yerevan
19:00 (UTC+4)	Eloyan 32'; Oliveira 56'; Malis (yellow card) 74'; Ramos (yellow card) 77'; Ayongo (yellow card) 85'	Report	Piloyan (yellow card) 39'; Nalbandyan 90+5' (pen.)	Stadium: Yerevan Football Academy Stadium; Referee: Ashot Ghaltakhchyan
Note: Match originally scheduled for 11 August.

29 September 2025 8	Van	1–2	Alashkert	Charentsavan
15:30 (UTC+4)	Mkoyan (yellow card) 10'; Bukhal (yellow card) 18'; Lucas Café (yellow card) 24'; Kirakosyan 45+2'	Report	Touré 6'; Matyukhin (yellow card) 41'; Macedo (yellow card) 44'; Nalbandyan 90+5' (pen.)	Stadium: City Stadium; Referee: Henrik Nalbandian

3 October 2025 9	Alashkert	1–1	Shirak	Armavir
15:30 (UTC+4)	Nalbandyan 52' (pen.); Macedo (yellow card) 65'; Sadoyan (yellow card) 76'	Report	Sumbulyan 20'; Mnatsakanyan (yellow card) 47'	Stadium: Hakob Tonoyan Stadium; Referee: Sargis Khachatryan

17 October 2025 10	Shirak	1–2	Alashkert	Gyumri
19:00 (UTC+4)	Mnatsakanyan (yellow card) 29'; Misakyan 64' (pen.); Kodia (red card) 90'	Report	Touré 3'; Henrique 23' (yellow card) 70'; Nalbandyan (yellow card) 45'; Terteryan (yellow card) 59'	Stadium: City Stadium; Referee: Artem Gasparyan

24 October 2025 11	Alashkert	1–0	Van	Armavir
15:30 (UTC+4)	Touré 2'; Gareginyan (yellow card) 32'	Report	Kirakosyan (yellow card) 32'; Eriki (yellow card) 33'; Yusuf (yellow card) 64'; Mnatsakanyan (yellow card) 69'; Bokov (yellow card) 76'	Stadium: Hakob Tonoyan Stadium; Referee: Ashot Harutyunyan

3 November 2025 12	Gandzasar Kapan	1–0	Alashkert	Yerevan
17:00 (UTC+4)	Alaverdyan (yellow card) 22'; Petrosyan 47'; Emmanuel (yellow card) 63'; Kanda (yellow card) 65'; Hayrapetyan (yellow card) 69'	Report	Piloyan (yellow card) 32'; Henrique (yellow card) 37'; Gareginyan (yellow card) 73'; Touré (red card) 80'	Stadium: Junior Stadium; Referee: Ashot Ghaltakhchyan

8 November 2025 13	Alashkert	2–0	BKMA Yerevan	Armavir
15:00 (UTC+4)	Nduka (yellow card) 50'; Drammeh 58'; Farayola 74'; Chima (yellow card) 76'	Report	Bashoyan (yellow card) 22'	Stadium: Hakob Tonoyan Stadium; Referee: Hovhannes Kalantaryan

22 November 2025 14	Noah	2–2	Alashkert	Abovyan
18:00 (UTC+4)	Saintini (yellow card) 8'; Manvelyan 14' (pen.); Silva (yellow card) 18'; Sualehe (red card) 21'; Hambardzumyan 38' (yellow card) 40'; Khamoyan (yellow card) 53'; Fofana (yellow card) 64'; Sangaré (yellow card) 88'	Report	Sadoyan (yellow card) 12'; Nalbandyan 25' (pen.); Nduka (yellow card) 58'; Touré 78' (yellow card) 90+6'; Piloyan (yellow card) 90+9'	Stadium: Vahagn Tumasyan Stadium; Referee: Yura Mahtesyan

29 November 2025 15	Alashkert	0–2	Urartu	Armavir
15:00 (UTC+4)		Report	Polyakov (yellow card) 15'; Melkonyan 28'; Santos (yellow card) 37'; Michel 44'; Piloyan (yellow card) 47'	Stadium: Hakob Tonoyan Stadium; Referee: Vardan Manukyan

7 March 2026 17	Alashkert	1–0	Ararat-Armenia	Yerevan
18:00 (UTC+4)	Nalbandyan (yellow card) 28'; Touré 57'; Piloyan (yellow card) 90+9'	Report	Bueno (yellow card) 16'; Eloyan (yellow card) 59'	Stadium: Republican Stadium; Referee: Artem Gasparyan

15 March 2026 18	Pyunik	1–0	Alashkert	Yerevan
15:30 (UTC+4)	Yansané 20'; Islamović (yellow card) 24'; Avagyan (yellow card) 90+2'	Report	Macedo (yellow card) 85'; Kirakosyan (yellow card) 90+3'	Stadium: Yerevan Football Academy Stadium; Referee: Artem Gasparyan

21 March 2026 19	Alashkert	0–1	Pyunik	Armavir
15:30 (UTC+4)	Granado (yellow card) 52'; Terteryan (yellow card) 63'; Sammani (yellow card) 90+1'; Matyukhin (yellow card) 90+7'	Report	Yansané 43'; Kovalenko (yellow card) 45+3'; Alemão (yellow card) 76'; Villela (yellow card) 90+3'	Stadium: Hakob Tonoyan Stadium; Referee: Ashot Ghaltakhchyan

6 April 2026 20	Ararat-Armenia	1–1	Alashkert	Abovyan
19:00 (UTC+4)	Welton (yellow card) 51'; Ayongo 62'; Banjaqui (yellow card) 82'	Report	Matyukhin (yellow card) 33'; Terteryan 64'; Nalbandyan (yellow card) 67'	Stadium: Vahagn Tumasyan Stadium; Referee: Ashot Harutyunyan

11 April 2026 16	Ararat Yerevan	2–3	Alashkert	Yerevan
15:00 (UTC+4)	Ouattara 35'; Ukadike (yellow card) 45+5'; Lulukyan (yellow card) 54'; Khachumyan (yellow card) 81'; Doumbia 86' (pen.)	Report	Touré 28' (pen.); Sabobo 29'; Macedo (yellow card) 38'; Farayola 45+1' (pen.); Henrique (yellow card) 55'; Piloyan (yellow card) 62'	Stadium: Republican Stadium; Referee: Yura Mahtesyan
Note: Match originally scheduled for and postponed on 27 February, due to adverse weather conditions.

14 April 2026 21	Alashkert	2–0	Ararat Yerevan	Armavir
15:00 (UTC+4)	Hakobyan 44'; Kartashyan 72' (o.g.); Gareginyan (yellow card) 76'; Drammeh (yellow card) 81'	Report	Lima (yellow card) 45'	Stadium: Hakob Tonoyan Stadium; Referee: Vardan Manukyan

19 April 2026 22	Urartu	1–3	Alashkert	Yerevan
19:00 (UTC+4)	Mishiyev (red card) 41'; Velosa 45+2'; Er.Piloyan (yellow card) 69'; Agasaryan (yellow card) 85' (yellow-red card) 90+4'; Santos (yellow card) 88'; Tsymbalyuk (yellow card) 90+7'	Report	Nalbandyan 10' (pen.), 59'; Klaidher (yellow card) 45'; Ed.Piloyan (yellow card) 90+5'; Granado 90+9'	Stadium: Urartu Stadium; Referee: Henrik Nalbandian

25 April 2026 23	Alashkert	1–1	Noah	Armavir
15:30 (UTC+4)	Piloyan (yellow card) 31'; Touré 80'; Farayola (yellow card) 87'; Beglaryan (yellow card) 90+5'	Report	Coneglian (yellow card) 73'; Sualehe (yellow card) 73'; Sangaré (yellow card) 82'; Oulad Omar 89'	Stadium: Hakob Tonoyan Stadium; Referee: Ashot Harutyunyan

2 May 2026 24	BKMA Yerevan	2–2	Alashkert	Yerevan
16:00 (UTC+4)	Kirakosyan 79'; H.Manukyan 81'; Sargsyan (yellow card) 90+1'	Report	Nalbandyan 4' (yellow card) 36'; Hakobyan (yellow card) 16' (yellow-red card) 63'; Touré 57'; Piloyan (yellow card) 90+3'	Stadium: Yerevan Football Academy Stadium; Referee: Ashot Ghaltakhchyan

9 May 2026 25	Alashkert	3–1	Gandzasar Kapan	Armavir
15:00 (UTC+4)	Nalbandyan 14' (pen.), 44' (pen.); Beglaryan (yellow card) 48'; Sabobo (yellow card) 69'; Henrique 90'	Report	Mani 47'; Alaverdyan (yellow card) 48'; Chibuike (yellow card) 61'	Stadium: Hakob Tonoyan Stadium; Referee: Vardan Manukyan

16 May 2026 26	Van	0–1	Alashkert	Charentsavan
16:00 (UTC+4)	Maurinho (yellow card) 36'; Torres (yellow card) 56'	Report	Matyukhin (yellow card) 39'; Nalbandyan 57' (pen.); Beglaryan (yellow card) 90+1'	Stadium: City Stadium; Referee: Henrik Nalbandian

26 May 2026 27	Alashkert	2–0	Shirak	Armavir
19:00 (UTC+4)	Vidić 5' (o.g.); Matyukhin 24'; Piloyan (yellow card) 58'; Sammani (yellow card) 88'; Gareginyan (yellow card) 90+3'	Report	Sargsyan (yellow card) 55'	Stadium: Hakob Tonoyan Stadium; Referee: Ashot Harutyunyan

==== League table ====
Pos	Team	Pld	W	D	L	GF	GA	GD	Pts	Qualification or relegation
1	Ararat-Armenia (C)	27	18	6	3	50	25	+25	60	Qualification for the Champions League first qualifying round
2	Noah	27	16	8	3	61	19	+42	56	Qualification for the Conference League second qualifying round (Note: The 2025–26 Armenian Cup winners (Noah) qualify for the Conference League second qualifying round.)
3	Pyunik	27	17	4	6	37	18	+19	55	Qualification for the Conference League first qualifying round
4	Alashkert	27	16	5	6	42	23	+19	53	Qualification for the Conference League first qualifying round
5	Urartu	27	14	7	6	43	26	+17	49	
6	Van	27	9	4	14	27	40	−13	31	
7	BKMA	27	4	11	12	30	42	−12	23	
8	Gandzasar Kapan	27	5	6	16	20	41	−21	21	
9	Ararat Yerevan	27	3	4	20	21	63	−42	13 (Note: Matches won: Ararat 3, Shirak 2)	
10	Shirak	27	2	7	18	17	51	−34	13	

Source: FFA
Rules for classification: 1) Points; 2) Head-to-head points; 3) Head-to-head goal difference; 4) Head-to-head goals scored; 5) Matches won; 6) Goal difference; 7) Less red cards; 8) Less yellow cards; 9) Fair-play ranking 10) Draw
(C) Champions

=== Armenian Cup ===
17 September 2025 Preliminary round	Gandzasar Kapan	2–1	Alashkert	Yerevan
17:00 (UTC+4)	Karagulyan (yellow card) 11'; Mani 27'; Hayrapetyan (yellow card) 29'; Ismail (yellow card) 65'; Alaverdyan 84' (yellow card) 85'; Matevosyan (yellow card) 88'; Emmanuel (yellow card) 90'; Avetisyan (yellow card) 90+5'	Report	Nduka (yellow card) 48'; Campos 54' (yellow card) 54'	Stadium: Junior Stadium; Referee: Sargis Khachatryan

== Squad statistics ==
As of match played 26 May 2026

=== Appearances and goals ===
No.	Pos	Nat	Player	Total		Premier League		Armenian Cup	
No.	Pos	Nat	Player	Apps	Goals	Apps	Goals	Apps	Goals
2	DF	(Armenia) ARM	Serob Grigoryan	17	0	5+11	0	1	0
3	DF	(Nigeria) NGR	Samuel Segun	1	0	0	0	1	0
4	DF	(Russia) RUS	Yaroslav Matyukhin	21	1	18+3	1	0	0
5	DF	(Armenia) ARM	Davit Terteryan	24	1	22+2	1	0	0
6	DF	(Armenia) ARM	Edgar Piloyan	27	2	25+1	2	0+1	0
7	MF	(Armenia) ARM	Karen Nalbandyan	26	14	25	14	0+1	0
8	MF	(Armenia) ARM	Yuri Gareginyan	26	0	19+6	0	1	0
9	FW	(Nigeria) NGR	Ahmad Khalil Sammani	8	0	0+8	0	0	0
10	FW	(Nigeria) NGR	Olawale Farayola	28	3	27	3	0+1	0
11	FW	(Guinea) GUI	Momo Touré	27	11	26	11	0+1	0
13	GK	(Armenia) ARM	Anatoliy Ayvazov	1	0	0	0	1	0
15	DF	(Armenia) ARM	Arsen Sadoyan	24	0	22+2	0	0	0
16	FW	(Nigeria) NGR	Isah Buhari	1	0	0+1	0	0	0
17	MF	(Zambia) ZAM	Joseph Sabobo	10	1	6+4	1	0	0
18	MF	(Nigeria) NGR	Ifeanyi Nduka	25	0	6+18	0	1	0
19	FW	(The Gambia) GAM	Kajally Drammeh	18	1	7+10	1	1	0
21	DF	(Colombia) COL	Jefferson Granado	8	1	1+7	1	0	0
22	DF	(Armenia) ARM	Robert Hakobyan	21	1	5+15	1	1	0
24	GK	(Armenia) ARM	Arsen Beglaryan	27	0	27	0	0	0
25	FW	(Brazil) BRA	Caio Henrique	25	3	15+9	3	0+1	0
44	DF	(Brazil) BRA	Klaidher Macedo	27	0	26	0	1	0
66	DF	(Armenia) ARM	Mher Kankanyan	2	0	0+2	0	0	0
73	MF	(Russia) RUS	David Kirakosyan	3	0	0+3	0	0	0
77	MF	(Venezuela) VEN	Juan Campos	8	1	0+7	0	1	1
88	MF	(Brazil) BRA	Rafael Jesus	12	0	10+2	0	0	0
Players away on loan:
20	FW	(Nigeria) NGR	Obi Chima	8	0	0+7	0	1	0
Players who left Ararat-Armenia during the season:
27	DF	(Ivory Coast) CIV	Julien Bationo	4	1	4	1	0	0
30	MF	(Nigeria) NGR	Dennis Mse	2	0	0+2	0	0	0
45	FW	(Nigeria) NGR	Malik Odeyinka	13	0	1+11	0	1	0

=== Goal scorers ===
Place	Position	Nation	Number	Name	Premier League	Armenian Cup	Total
1	MF	(Armenia)	7	Karen Nalbandyan	14	0	14
2	FW	(Guinea)	11	Momo Touré	11	0	11
3	FW	(Brazil)	25	Caio Henrique	3	0	3
3	FW	(Nigeria)	10	Olawale Farayola	3	0	3
5	DF	(Armenia)	6	Edgar Piloyan	2	0	2
5				Own goal	2	0	2
7	DF	(Ivory Coast)	27	Julien Bationo	1	0	1
7	FW	(The Gambia)	19	Kajally Drammeh	1	0	1
7	DF	(Armenia)	5	Davit Terteryan	1	0	1
7	DF	(Armenia)	22	Robert Hakobyan	1	0	1
7	DF	(Colombia)	21	Jefferson Granado	1	0	1
7	MF	(Zambia)	17	Joseph Sabobo	1	0	1
7	DF	(Russia)	4	Yaroslav Matyukhin	1	0	1
7	MF	(Venezuela)	77	Juan Campos	0	1	1
				TOTALS	42	1	43

=== Clean sheets ===
Place	Position	Nation	Number	Name	Premier League	Armenian Cup	Total
1	GK	(Armenia)	24	Arsen Beglaryan	10	0	10
				TOTALS	10	0	10

=== Disciplinary record ===
Number	Nation	Position	Name	Premier League		Armenian Cup		Total	
Number	Nation	Position	Name	Yellow card	Red card	Yellow card	Red card	Yellow card	Red card
4	(Russia)	DF	Yaroslav Matyukhin	4	0	0	0	4	0
5	(Armenia)	DF	Davit Terteryan	4	0	0	0	4	0
6	(Armenia)	DF	Edgar Piloyan	9	0	0	0	9	0
7	(Armenia)	MF	Karen Nalbandyan	6	0	0	0	6	0
8	(Armenia)	MF	Yuri Gareginyan	4	0	0	0	4	0
9	(Nigeria)	FW	Ahmad Khalil Sammani	2	0	0	0	2	0
10	(Nigeria)	FW	Olawale Farayola	1	0	0	0	1	0
11	(Guinea)	FW	Momo Touré	1	1	0	0	1	1
15	(Armenia)	DF	Arsen Sadoyan	3	0	0	0	3	0
17	(Zambia)	MF	Joseph Sabobo	1	0	0	0	1	0
18	(Nigeria)	MF	Ifeanyi Nduka	3	0	1	0	4	0
19	(The Gambia)	FW	Kajally Drammeh	2	0	0	0	2	0
21	(Colombia)	DF	Jefferson Granado	1	0	0	0	1	0
22	(Armenia)	DF	Robert Hakobyan	2	1	0	0	2	1
24	(Armenia)	GK	Arsen Beglaryan	3	0	0	0	3	0
25	(Brazil)	FW	Caio Henrique	3	0	0	0	3	0
44	(Brazil)	DF	Klaidher Macedo	6	0	0	0	6	0
73	(Russia)	MF	David Kirakosyan	1	0	0	0	1	0
77	(Venezuela)	MF	Juan Campos	0	0	1	0	1	0
Players away on loan:
20	(Nigeria)	FW	Obi Chima	1	0	0	0	1	0
Players who left Ararat-Armenia during the season:
27	(Ivory Coast)	DF	Julien Bationo	1	0	0	0	1	0
			TOTALS	58	2	2	0	60	2
