= Domi Massoumou =

Congolese footballer (born 1982)

Personal information
- Full name: Domi Jaurès Massoumou
- Date of birth: June 4, 2003 (age 23)
- Place of birth: Brazzaville, Republic of the Congo
- Height: 1.77 m (5 ft 10 in)
- Position: Forward

Team information
- Current team: Alashkert
- Number: 14

Senior career*
| Years | Team | Apps | (Gls) |
| 2015–2019 | Pénarol Brazzaville | | |
| 2019–2021 | Kondzo | | |
| 2021–2022 | Otohô | | |
| 2022–2024 | Diables Noirs | | |
| 2024–2026 | Qabala | 60 | (25) |
| 2026– | Alashkert | 12 | (9) |

International career^{‡}
| 2023– | Congo | 5 | (0) |
- * Club domestic league appearances and goals as of 3 November 2026 ‡ National team caps and goals as of 1 October 2026

Domi Jaurès Massoumou (born 4 June 2003) is a football player who currently plays for Alashkert in the Armenian Premier League and the Congo national football team.

== Club career ==
On 20 August 2024, Azerbaijan Premier League club Qabala announced the signing of Massoumou from Diables Noirs, to a two-year contract.

On 21 June 2026, Armenian Premier League club Alashkert announced the signing of Massoumou.

== Career statistics ==
=== Club ===
As of match played 31 October 2026

Appearances and goals by club, season and competition
| Club | Season | League | | | National cup (Note: Includes Azerbaijan Cup, Armenian Cup) | | Continental | | Other | | Total | |
| Club | Season | Division | Apps | Goals | Apps | Goals | Apps | Goals | Apps | Goals | Apps | Goals |
|---|---|---|---|---|---|---|---|---|---|---|---|---|
| Qabala | 2024–25 | Azerbaijan First League | 27 | 16 | 2 | 2 | — | | — | | 29 | 18 |
| Qabala | 2025–26 | Azerbaijan Premier League | 33 | 9 | 4 | 1 | — | | 1 (Note: Appearance in the Azerbaijan Premier League Relegation Play-off) | 0 | 38 | 10 |
| Qabala | Total | | 60 | 25 | 6 | 3 | - | - | 1 | 0 | 67 | 28 |
| Alashkert | 2026–27 | Armenian Premier League | 12 | 9 | 1 | 0 | 4 (Note: Appearance(s) in the UEFA Conference League) | 0 | — | | 17 | 9 |
| Career total | | | 72 | 34 | 7 | 3 | 4 | 0 | 1 | 0 | 84 | 37 |

=== International ===
As of match played 29 September 2026

Appearances and goals by national team and year
| National team | Year | Apps | Goals |
|---|---|---|---|
| Congo | 2023 | 3 | 0 |
| Congo | 2026 | 2 | 0 |
| Total | | 5 | 0 |
