= Philip Ejike =

Nigerian footballer (born 2000)

Personal information
- Full name: Philip Chinemerem Ejike
- Date of birth: 18 April 2002 (age 24)
- Place of birth: Karmo, Nigeria
- Height: 1.80 m (5 ft 11 in)
- Position: Centre-forward

Team information
- Current team: Alashkert
- Number: 19

Senior career*
Years	Team	Apps	(Gls)
2020–2022	Mavlon FC		
2022–2026	Montana	92	(24)
2025	→ Eupen (loan)	10	(0)
2026–	Alashkert	7	(3)
- * Club domestic league appearances and goals as of 26 October 2026

Philip Ejike (born 18 April 2002) is a Nigerian professional footballer who plays as a centre-forward for Armenian Premier League club Alashkert.

== Career ==
Ejike began his career at Mavlon FC, before moving to Bulgarian club Montana in November 2022.

On 26 January 2025, Ejike was loaned to Belgian Challenger Pro League club Eupen until the end of the season. On 1 February, he made his debut for the club, as a substitute, in a 3–2 win against Lommel in the league. He returned to Montana at the end of the season having made 10 appearances in Belgium.

On 15 June 2026, Armenian Premier League club Alashkert announced the signing of Ejike from Montana.

== Career statistics ==
=== Club ===
As of match played 24 October 2026

Appearances and goals by club, season and competition
Club	Season	League			National cup (Note: Includes Armenian Cup)		Continental		Other		Total	
Club	Season	Division	Apps	Goals	Apps	Goals	Apps	Goals	Apps	Goals	Apps	Goals
Alashkert	2026–27	Armenian Premier League	7	3	0	0	4 (Note: Appearance(s) in the UEFA Conference League)	0	—		11	3
Career total			7	3	0	0	4	0	0	0	11	3
