= FC Alashkert =

Association football club in Armenia

Alashkert
- Full name: Football Club Alashkert
- Nickname: Դեղինները (The Yellows)
- Founded: 1990; 36 years ago
- Ground: Alashkert Stadium
- Capacity: 6,850
- Owner(s): Bagrat Navoyan & Anton Zingarevich
- Manager: Vahe Gevorgyan
- League: Armenian Premier League
- 2025–26: 4th of 10
- Website: fcalashkert.com
Home colours	Away colours	Third colours

Football Club Alashkert (Armenian: Ֆուտբոլային Ակումբ Ալաշկերտ, romanized: Futbolayin Akumb Alashkert), commonly known as Alashkert, is an Armenian football club based in the capital Yerevan, founded in 1990 in Martuni and after folding in 2000 re-founded in 2011. They currently play in the Armenian Premier League. The home stadium of the team is the Alashkert Stadium in Yerevan. The club headquarters are located on Saryan street 25, Yerevan. Although based in Yerevan they are in fact named after the historic town of Alashkert in the Western Armenia, now Eleşkirt.

Alashkert have won the Armenian Premier League title on four occasions and the Armenian Cup once. The club has also won the Armenian Supercup three times.

They are owned by Bagrat Navoyan, a businessman and founder of Bagretour LLC, and have a cooperation agreement with the Brazilian club Botafogo since August 2017.

In 2021, Alashkert qualified for the 2021-22 UEFA Europa Conference League, become the first club from Armenia to qualify for a UEFA organsied club competition.

== History ==
Club logo between 2012 and 2017

Football Club Alashkert was founded in 1990 in the town of Martuni of Gegharkunik Province. In 1992, the team played in the Premier League representing Martuni and using the City Stadium of the town as their home venue. However, at the end of the season the team finished last in the table, being relegated to the First League. As a result, the club withdrew from the competition.

In 1998, FC Alashkert returned to professional football and participated in the First League finishing the table in 6th position. In 1999, they did not participate in the First League competition and later in early 2000, the club was dissolved.

=== Revival in 2011 ===
In late 2011, FC Alashkert were re-founded by Bagrat Navoyan, a businessman native of Martuni. They entered the 2012–13 Armenian First League competition and won the championship, booking their place in the Armenian Premier League for the 2013–14 season. In 2012–2013, the team was managed by the former Armenian player Albert Sarkisyan.

=== Relocation to Yerevan in 2013 ===
In February 2013, the club purchased the Nairi Stadium in Yerevan, to become the official venue of their home games. As a result, the club was officially relocated from Martuni to Yerevan starting from the 2013–14 season.

=== 2013/14 Season-Present ===
In the 2013/14 season, Alashkert finished bottom of the table. However, they weren't relegated.

In the 2014/15 Alashkert secured a 4th placed finish and a spot in the Europa League Qualifiers.

The 2015/16 season saw Alashkert have a superb performance in the Armenian Premier League, winning the title after a tough battle with runners-up Shirak SC.

The 2016/17 season saw Alashkert win the Armenian league title for the second consecutive season.

The 2017/18 season marked a zenith for Alashkert as they clinched the title for the third consecutive time, establishing their dominance in Armenian football. This achievement underscored the club's strategic prowess and the skillful execution of their players on the field.

Facing the challenge of sustaining peak performance, Alashkert secured a fourth-place finish in the 2018/19 season.

However, the subsequent season, 2019/20, demonstrated the team's ability to recalibrate and maintain a competitive edge, resulting in a commendable third-place finish.

The narrative took an exhilarating turn in the 2020/21 season when Alashkert, fueled by a renewed sense of purpose, once again secured the title, adding another chapter to their storied legacy. Alashkert also finished runners-up in the Armenian Cup, losing 3-1 in the final to Ararat. In 2021 Alashkert also won the Armenian Supercup, defeating Ararat 1-0 to secure the trophy.

In the 2021/22 season, Alashkert maintained a competitive stance, securing a third-place finish.

The recent 2022/23 season saw the club finish in fourth place, inviting strategic reflection and a renewed commitment to future seasons.

In December 2017, Alashkert entered into partnerships with Brazilian clubs Botafogo and Fluminense.

== Domestic record ==
League records of Alashkert FC:

Season	League									National Cup	Europe	Top goalscorer		Manager
Season	Division	Pos.	Pl.	W	D	L	GS	GA	P	National Cup	Europe	Name	League	Manager
1990	Soviet Lower Second League	17	18	7	5	6	29	37	19					
1991	Soviet Lower Second League	17	38	12	4	22	51	79	28					
1992	Armenian Premier League	24	22	5	2	15	38	58	12	Quarter-final				(Armenia) Albert Ohanyan
1993–97	No Participation													
1998	Armenian First League	6	24	9	8	7	30	25	30	Preliminary round				
1999	Armenian First League	10	–	–	–	–	–	–	–	First round				
2000–11	No Participation													
2012–13	Armenian First League	1	36	24	6	6	80	31	78	Quarter-final		(Armenia) Vardan Petrosyan	15	(Armenia) Albert Sarkisyan
2013–14	Armenian Premier League	8	28	6	6	16	38	69	24	Quarter-final		(Armenia) Mihran Manasyan	17	(Armenia) Armen Sanamyan (Armenia) Armen Gyulbudaghyants
2014–15	Armenian Premier League	4	28	10	8	10	32	35	38	Semi-final		(Armenia) Mihran Manasyan	9	(Armenia) Abraham Khashmanyan
2015–16	Armenian Premier League	1	28	16	7	5	50	24	55	Semi-final	UEL 2Q	(Armenia) Mihran Manasyan (Brazil) Héber	16	(Armenia) Abraham Khashmanyan
2016–17	Armenian Premier League	1	30	19	7	4	59	26	64	Quarter-final	UCL 2Q	(Armenia) Mihran Manasyan (Armenia) Artak Yedigaryan	13	(Armenia) Abraham Khashmanyan
2017–18	Armenian Premier League	1	30	14	8	8	44	31	50	Runners Up	UCL 2Q	(Armenia) Artak Yedigaryan	13	(Armenia) Abraham Khashmanyan (Armenia) Varuzhan Sukiasyan
2018–19	Armenian Premier League	4	32	15	6	11	37	27	51	Winner	UEL 3Q	(Serbia) Uroš Nenadović	6	(Armenia) Varuzhan Sukiasyan (Armenia) Aram Voskanyan (Armenia) Abraham Khashmanyan
2019–20	Armenian Premier League	3	28	14	5	9	51	31	47	Quarter-final	UEL 2Q	(Bosnia and Herzegovina) Aleksandar Glišić	11	(Armenia) Abraham Khashmanyan (Armenia) Armen Adamyan (Caretaker) (Armenia) Yegishe Melikyan
2020–21	Armenian Premier League	1	24	13	7	4	25	15	46	Runners Up	UEL 1Q	(Russia) David Davidyan	5	(Armenia) Yegishe Melikyan (Armenia) Abraham Khashmanyan (Armenia) Aleksandr Grigoryan
2021–22	Armenian Premier League	3	32	14	9	9	38	30	51	Quarter-final	UECL GS	(Guinea-Bissau) José Embaló	7	(Armenia) Aleksandr Grigoryan (Serbia) Milan Milanović (Armenia) Aram Voskanyan
2022–23	Armenian Premier League	4	36	20	6	10	58	37	66	Quarter-final	UECL 1QR	(Colombia) Bladimir Díaz	11	(Armenia) Karen Barseghyan (Armenia) Vahe Gevorgyan
2023–24	Armenian Premier League	5	36	13	6	17	54	56	45	Second Round	UECL 2QR	(Georgia (country)) Levan Kutalia	12	(Armenia) Vahe Gevorgyan
2024–25	Armenian Premier League	9	30	6	8	16	24	52	26	Second Round	-	(Armenia) Sargis Metoyan	8	(Armenia) Abraham Khashmanyan (Armenia) Edgar Torosyan (Armenia) Albert Safaryan
2025–26	Armenian Premier League	4	27	16	5	6	42	23	53	Preliminary Round	-	(Armenia) Karen Nalbandyan	14	(Armenia) Vahe Gevorgyan

=== Records ===
- Seasons in top division – 10 (1992–present)
- Lowest league position – 24 (1992)
- Biggest 'undefeated' streak in the league – 11 matches (10/05/15 – 19/09/15)
- Win record for season – 24 (2012–13) (First League)
- Loss record for season – 22 (1991) (Soviet Lower Second League)
- Most points in a season – 78 (2012–2013) (First League)
- Most league goals in a season (club) – 80 (2012–2013) (First League)
- All time League goals – 834 (since 1990)
- Most goals in a season (player) – 17, (Armenia) Mihran Manasyan, 2013–14
- Biggest win – 6–0 vs (Armenia) FC Artsakh, 2018
- Biggest defeat – 9–2 vs (Armenia) Gandzasar Kapan, 2013
- Biggest home win – 6–0 vs (Armenia) FC Artsakh, 2018
- Biggest home defeat – 5–0 vs (Armenia) FC Pyunik, 2013
- Biggest away win – 4–0 vs (Armenia) Gandzasar Kapan, 2018
- Biggest away defeat – 9–2 vs (Armenia) Gandzasar Kapan, 2013
- Highest attendance ever – 59.047 vs (Scotland) Celtic, 2018
- Highest attendance home game – 9.000 vs (Romania) CFR Cluj, 2018
- Highest attendance away game – 59.047 vs (Scotland) Celtic, 2018
- Highest attendance in league or cup – 4.000 vs (Armenia) Ararat, 2021 and vs (Armenia) Lori Vanadzor, 2019
- All-time most appearances – (Armenia) Artak Grigoryan, 198
- All-time top scorer – (Armenia) Mihran Manasyan, 76

== Europe ==
Alashkert first qualified for the Europa League 2015–16 qualification round 1, after gaining 4th place in the Armenian Premier League 2014–2015. In the first round Alashkert drew the Scottish club St Johnstone. Despite the fact that St Johnstone were considered as the favourites, Alashkert were victorious after the two games and were able to create a sensation. In the second round, Alashkert had to meet the Kazakh side Kairat. In the first game Alashkert were defeated 3–0. In the second game, Alashkert were able to achieve victory as a result of a last-minute winner scored by Heber Araujo, 2–1. However this was not enough to qualify for the third round.

Alashkert were the first ever Armenian side to play in a European group stage after defeating Kairat 3–2 on 12 August 2021. They played Rangers in the play-off for the Europa League, but lost 1–0 on aggregate. As a result, they dropped into the Europa Conference League group stage, where they were drawn in a group alongside Maccabi Tel Aviv, HJK Helsinki and LASK. After losing their first five matches, Alashkert managed to draw 1–1 against Maccabi Tel Aviv on matchday six, which was the first ever point earned by an Armenian side in any UEFA group stage.

=== European record ===

The squad for the first match for an Armenian side in group stage history for the UEFA Conference League match against Maccabi Tel-Aviv on 14 September 2021

As of match played 30 July 2026

Competition	Pld	W	D	L	GF	GA	GD
UEFA Champions League	14	3	5	6	12	20	–8
UEFA Europa League	17	7	3	7	17	23	–6
UEFA Conference League	16	3	5	8	19	30	–11
Total	47	13	13	21	48	73	–25

Season	Competition	Round	Opponent	Home	Away	Aggregate	Note
2015–16	UEFA Europa League	1Q	(Scotland) St Johnstone	1–0	1–2	2–2 (a)	
2015–16	UEFA Europa League	2Q	(Kazakhstan) Kairat	2–1	0–3	2–4	
2016–17	UEFA Champions League	1Q	(Andorra) Santa Coloma	3–0	0–0	3–0	
2016–17	UEFA Champions League	2Q	(Georgia (country)) Dinamo Tbilisi	1–1	0–2	1–3	
2017–18	UEFA Champions League	1Q	(Andorra) Santa Coloma	1–0	1–1	2–1	
2017–18	UEFA Champions League	2Q	(Belarus) BATE Borisov	1–3	1–1	2–4	
2018–19	UEFA Champions League	1Q	(Scotland) Celtic	0–3	0–3	0–6	
2018–19	UEFA Europa League	2Q	(Montenegro) Sutjeska Nikšić	0–0	1–0	1–0	
2018–19	UEFA Europa League	3Q	(Romania) CFR Cluj	0−2	0–5	0–7	
2019–20	UEFA Europa League	1Q	(North Macedonia) Makedonija GP	3–1	3–0	6–1	
2019–20	UEFA Europa League	2Q	(Romania) FCSB	0−3	3–2	3–5	
2020–21	UEFA Europa League	1Q	(North Macedonia) Renova	0−1	—N/a	0–1	
2021–22	UEFA Champions League	1Q	(Wales) Connah's Quay Nomads	1–0 (a.e.t.)	2–2	3–2	
2021–22	UEFA Champions League	2Q	(Moldova) Sheriff Tiraspol	0−1	1−3	1–4	
2021–22	UEFA Europa League	3Q	(Kazakhstan) Kairat	3–2 (a.e.t.)	0–0	3−2	
2021–22	UEFA Europa League	PO	(Scotland) Rangers	0–0	0–1	0–1	
2021–22	UEFA Europa Conference League	GS	(Austria) LASK	0–3	0–2	4th place	
2021–22	UEFA Europa Conference League	GS	(Israel) Maccabi Tel Aviv	1–1	1–4	4th place	
2021–22	UEFA Europa Conference League	GS	(Finland) HJK	2–4	0–1	4th place	
2022–23	UEFA Europa Conference League	1Q	(Malta) Ħamrun Spartans	1–0	1–4	2–4	
2023–24	UEFA Europa Conference League	1Q	(Montenegro) Arsenal Tivat	1–1	6–1	7–2	
2023–24	UEFA Europa Conference League	2Q	(Hungary) Debrecen	0–1	2–1 (a.e.t.)	2–2 (1–3 p)	
2026–27	UEFA Conference League	1Q	(Kazakhstan) Yelimay	1–1	2–2	3–3 (5–6 p)	
2026–27	UEFA Conference League	2Q	(Romania) CFR Cluj	1–1	0–3	1–4	

- Biggest win in UEFA competitions: 3–0 vs (Andorra) FC Santa Coloma (5 July 2016) and vs (North Macedonia) Makedonija GP (18 July 2019)
- Biggest defeat in UEFA competitions: 0–5 vs (Romania) CFR Cluj (16 August 2018)
- Club appearances in UEFA competitions: 7
- Highest attendance – 59.047 vs (Scotland) Celtic, 2018
- Player with most UEFA appearances: (Armenia) Artak Grigoryan – 29 appearances
- Top scorer in UEFA competitions: (Serbia) Uros Nenadovic – 4 goals
- Goalkeeper with most clean sheets in UEFA competitions: (Serbia) Ognjen Cancarevic – 5 matches

=== UEFA coefficient ===
Last update: 12 August 2021

The following list ranks the current position of Alashkert in UEFA club ranking:

Rank	Team	Points
138	(Netherlands) Vitesse Arnhem	8.500
139	(Estonia) Flora Tallinn	8.250
140	(Armenia) Alashkert	8.000
141	(Kazakhstan) Kairat	8.000
142	(Croatia) Hajduk Split	8.000

=== List of opponents by nation ===
Nat.	Pld1	W1	D1	L1	GF1	GA1	GD
Andorra	4	2	2	0	5	1	+4
Austria	2	0	0	2	0	5	–5
Belarus	2	0	1	1	2	4	–2
Finland	2	0	0	2	2	5	–3
(Georgia (country)) Georgia	2	0	1	1	1	3	−2
Israel	2	0	1	1	2	5	–3
Kazakhstan	4	2	1	1	5	6	–1
Malta	1	1	0	0	1	0	+1
Moldova	2	0	0	2	1	4	–3
Montenegro	2	1	1	0	1	0	+1
North Macedonia	3	2	0	1	6	2	+4
Romania	4	1	0	3	3	12	–9
Scotland	6	1	1	4	2	9	–7
Wales	2	1	1	0	3	2	+1

=== List of opponents by club ===
Club	Pld	W	D	L	GF	GA	GD
(Andorra) FC Santa Coloma	4	2	2	0	5	1	+4
(Austria) LASK	2	0	0	2	0	5	–5
(Belarus) BATE Borisov	2	0	1	1	2	4	–2
(Finland) HJK	2	0	0	2	2	5	–3
(Georgia (country)) Dinamo Tbilisi	2	0	1	1	1	3	–2
(Israel) Maccabi Tel Aviv	2	0	1	1	2	5	–3
(Kazakhstan) Kairat	4	2	1	1	5	6	–1
(Malta) Ħamrun Spartans	1	1	0	0	1	0	+1
(Moldova) Sheriff Tiraspol	2	0	0	2	1	4	–3
(Montenegro) Sutjeska Nikšić	2	1	1	0	1	0	+1
(North Macedonia) Makedonija GP	2	2	0	0	6	1	+5
(North Macedonia) Renova	1	0	0	1	0	1	–1
(Romania) CFR Cluj	2	0	0	2	0	7	–7
(Romania) FCSB	2	1	0	1	3	5	–2
(Scotland) Celtic	2	0	0	2	0	6	–6
(Scotland) Rangers	2	0	1	1	0	1	–1
(Scotland) St Johnstone	2	1	0	1	2	2	0
(Wales) Connah's Quay Nomads	2	1	1	0	3	2	+1

== Stadiums ==
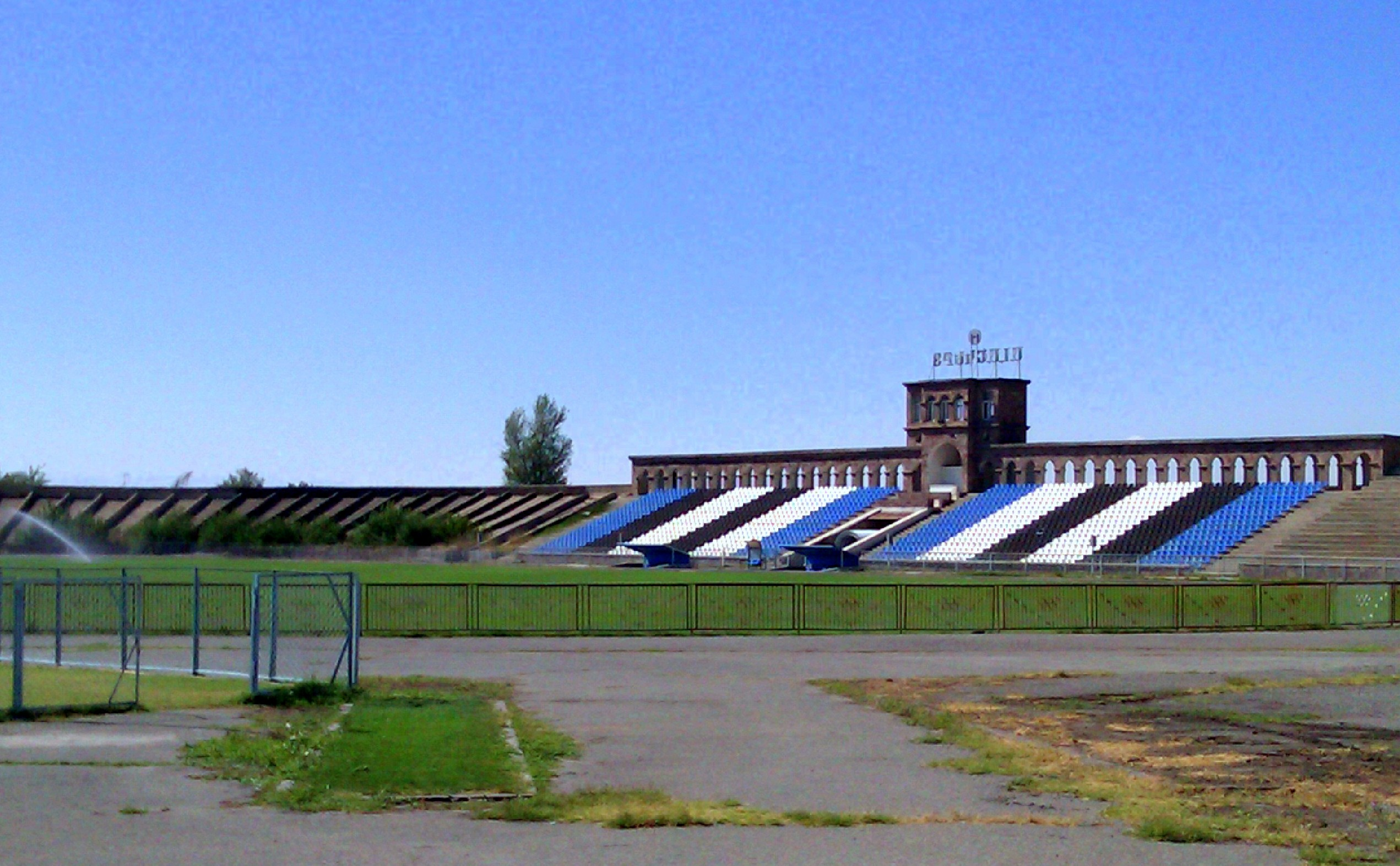
Alashkert Stadium

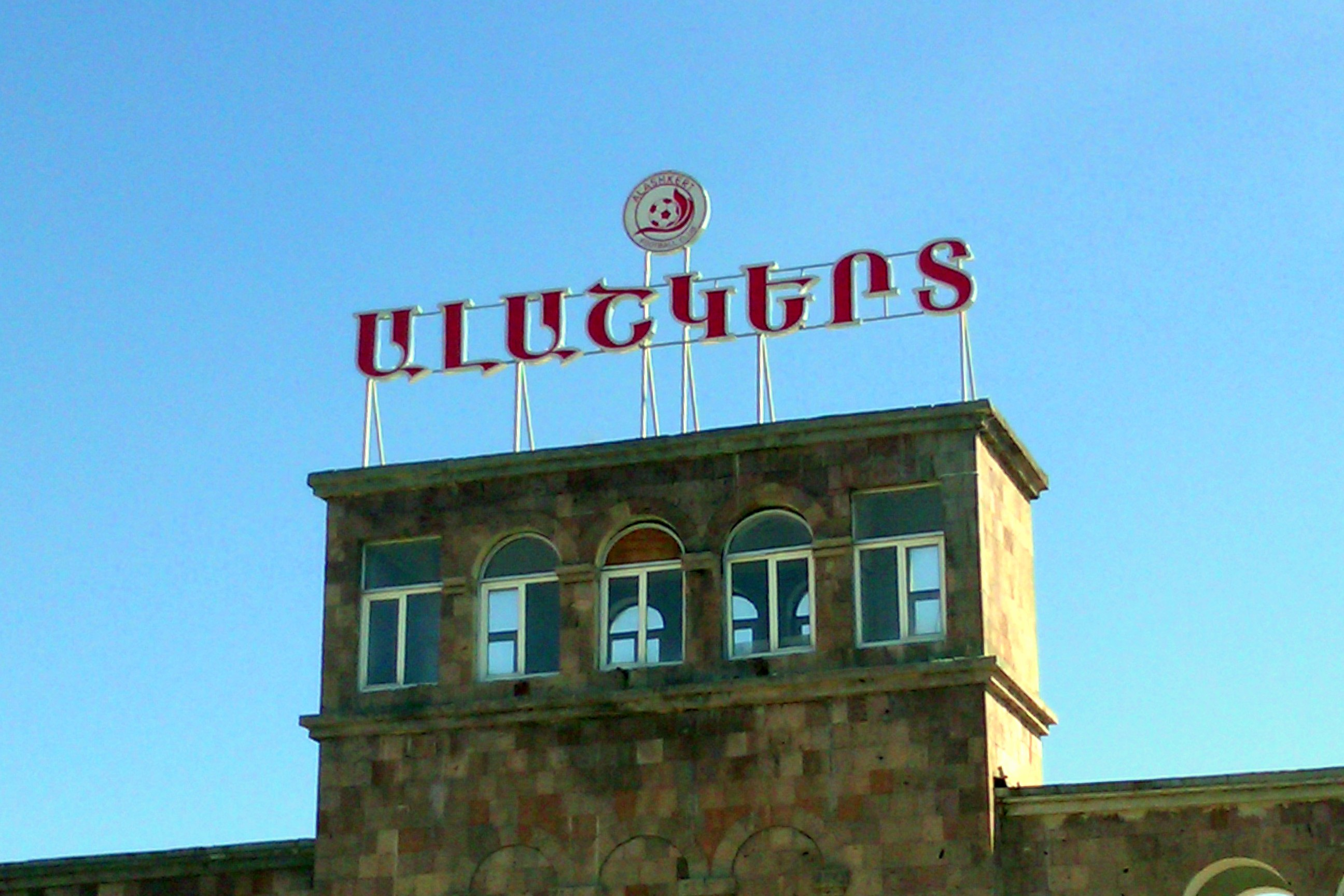
Alashkert logo at the main entrance of the stadium

Between 1990 and 2000, the club was based in the Martuni City Stadium in the town of Martuni, near the shores of Lake Sevan.

After the revival of the club in 2011, they were relocated to Yerevan, playing their home games in different stadiums of the capital city, mainly at the Nairi Stadium. However, Nairi Stadium – later renamed Alashkert Stadium – was purchased by the owners of FC Alashkert in February 2013.

Due to the large-scale renovation works at the Alashkert Stadium, Alashkert used the Vazgen Sargsyan Republican Stadium and Hrazdan Stadium during the 2013–14 Armenian Premier League season. Alashkert continue to use the Vazgen Sargsyan Republican Stadium to host European matches, due to Alashkert Stadium not meeting UEFA stadium category requirements.

The club returned to their own Alashkert Stadium during the 2014–15 Armenian Premier League season.

== Honours ==
- Armenian Premier League:
  - Winner (4): 2015–16, 2016–17, 2017–18, 2020–21
- Armenian Cup:
  - Winner (1): 2018–19
- Armenian First League:
  - Winner (1): 2012–13
- Armenian Supercup:
  - Winner (3): 2016, 2018, 2021

== Current squad ==
As of 1 October 2026

Note: Flags indicate national team as defined under FIFA eligibility rules; some limited exceptions apply. Players may hold more than one non-FIFA nationality.

No.	Pos.	Nation	Player
1	GK	ARM	Vlad Chatunts
3	DF	BRA	Cézar
4	DF	RUS	Yaroslav Matyukhin
5	DF	ARM	Davit Terteryan
6	MF	NGR	Hussein Muiz Adebayo
7	MF	ARM	Karen Nalbandyan
8	DF	ARM	Edgar Piloyan
10	FW	NGR	Olawale Farayola
11	FW	GUI	Momo Touré
14	FW	CGO	Domi Massoumou
15	DF	ARM	Arsen Sadoyan
16	FW	NGR	Isah Yahaya Buhari
17	FW	ZAM	Joseph Sabobo Banda
18	MF	NGR	Ifeanyi David Nduka

No.	Pos.	Nation	Player
19	FW	NGR	Philip Ejike
20	MF	MLI	Daouda Togola
21	FW	COL	Jefferson Granado
22	DF	ARM	Robert Hakobyan
23	DF	ARM	Stepan Gigolyan
24	GK	ARM	Arsen Beglaryan
31	GK	RUS	Daniil Polyansky
55	DF	ARM	Hakob Hakobyan
73	MF	ARM	David Kirakosyan
77	MF	ARM	Daniyel Agbalyan
88	MF	BRA	Rafael Jesus
99	GK	SLE	Ibrahim Sesay
—	FW	NGR	Obi Chima

=== Out on loan ===
Note: Flags indicate national team as defined under FIFA eligibility rules; some limited exceptions apply. Players may hold more than one non-FIFA nationality.

No.	Pos.	Nation	Player
9	FW	NGR	Khalil Ahmad Sammani (at Van)
28	MF	NGR	Usman Ajibona (at Torpedo Moscow)

No.	Pos.	Nation	Player
77	MF	VEN	Juan Campos (at Al Wasl)

== Alashkert-2 ==
Alashkert-2
- Founded: 2013; 13 years ago
- Ground: Alashkert Stadium, Yerevan
- Capacity: 6,850
- Owner: Bagratour LLC
- President: Bagrat Navoyan
- League: Armenian First League
- 2023–24: 9th of 15
- Website: http://fcalashkert.am/
Home colours	Away colours

The club's reserve squad plays as Alashkert-2 in the Armenian First League. They also play their home games at the Alashkert Stadium.

=== Youth teams ===
Alashkert run a small football school for youth teams on training pitches adjacent to the Alashkert Stadium in Yerevan. They also run a football school in the town of Masis in Ararat Province.

== Personnel ==
=== Technical staff ===
Position	Name
Head coach	(Armenia) Vahe Gevorgyan
Assistant coach	(Armenia) Artur Hovhannisyan
Assistant coach	(Belarus) Sergey Zenevich
Goalkeeping coach	(Armenia) Hayk Kirakosyan
Fitness Coach	(Armenia) Hayk Voskanyan
Head Doctor	(Armenia) Arman Hakobyan
Team Manager	(Armenia) Garik Mnatsakanyan

=== Management ===
Position	Name
Owner/President	(Armenia) Bagrat Navoyan & (Russia) Anton Zingarevich
Vice President	(Armenia) Tigran Mkrtchyan
Chief Executive Officer	(Russia) Alexey Balyberdin
Sports Director	(Russia) Fyodor Burdykin
Head of Media	(Armenia) Yervand Hakobyan
Head of PR & Marketing	(Armenia) Aghasi Gharagyozyan

== Managerial history ==
Managers of FC Alashkert since the club revived in late 2011:

- (Armenia) Albert Sarkisyan (1 January 2012 – 30 April 2013)
- (Armenia) Armen Sanamyan (30 April 2013 – 23 October 2013)
- (Armenia) Armen Gyulbudaghyants (2 November 2013 – 30 August 2014)
- (Armenia) Abraham Khashmanyan (31 August 2014 – 1 April 2018)
- (Armenia) Varuzhan Sukiasyan (1 April 2018 – 21 September 2018)
- (Armenia) Aram Voskanyan (25 September 2018 – 14 April 2019)
- (Armenia) Abraham Khashmanyan (15 April 2019 – 20 May 2021)
- (Armenia) (Russia) Aleksandr Grigoryan (20 May 2021 –20 September 2021 )
- (Serbia) Milan Milanović (26 September 2021 – 13 January 2022)
- (Armenia) Aram Voskanyan (13 January 2022 – 28 April 2022)
- (Armenia) Armen Petrosyan (28 April 2022 – 17 June 2022)
- (Armenia) Karen Barseghyan (1 July 2022 – 24 December 2022)
- (Armenia) Vahe Gevorgyan (24 December 2022 – 17 June 2024)
- (Armenia) Abraham Khashmanyan (1 July 2024 – 22 January 2025)
- (Armenia) Edgar Torosyan (19 February 2025 – 18 April 2025)
- (Armenia) Albert Safaryan (19 April 2025 – 25 June 2025)
- (Armenia) Vahe Gevorgyan (1 July 2025 –

== See also ==
- Football in Armenia
- Football Federation of Armenia
