= Ibrahim Sesay (footballer) =

Sierra Leonean footballer

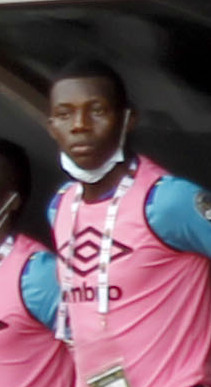

Personal information
- Full name: Ibrahim Sesay
- Date of birth: 18 October 2004 (age 22)
- Place of birth: Freetown, Sierra Leone
- Position: Goalkeeper

Team information
- Current team: Alashkert
- Number: 99

Senior career*
Years	Team	Apps	(Gls)
2020–2021	East End Lions		
2021–2025	Bo Rangers		
2025–	Alashkert	1	(0)
2026–	→ Andranik (loan)	6	(0)

International career^{‡}
2021–	Sierra Leone	1	(0)
- * Club domestic league appearances and goals as of 08:45, 12 October 2026 (UTC) ‡ National team caps and goals as of 18:26, 9 January 2022 (UTC)

Ibrahim Sesay (born 18 October 2004) is a Sierra Leonean professional footballer who plays as a goalkeeper for the Armenian club Andranik on loan from Alashkert, and the Sierra Leone national team.

== Career ==
Sesay began his senior career with the East End Lions, and transferred to Bo Rangers on 13 October 2021.

On 4 July 2025, Armenian Premier League club Alashkert announced the signing of Sesay.

== International career ==
Sesay made his international debut with the Sierra Leone national team in a 2–1 friendly win over The Gambia on 9 October 2021. He was part of the Sierra Leone squad the 2021 Africa Cup of Nations. At 17, he was the youngest player called up to the tournament.
