= Karen Nalbandyan =

Armenian footballer (born 2002)

Personal information
- Date of birth: 14 April 2002 (age 24)
- Place of birth: Yerevan, Armenia
- Height: 1.68 m (5 ft 6 in)
- Position: Attacking midfielder

Team information
- Current team: Alashkert
- Number: 7

Youth career
- –2018: Urartu
- 2018–2019: Lokomotiv Yerevan U-18

Senior career*
Years	Team	Apps	(Gls)
2018	Lokomotiv Yerevan	7	(0)
2019–2020	FDC Vista Gelendzhik		
2020–2022	Noravank	52	(5)
2022–2023	Noah	13	(0)
2023–2024	Alashkert	43	(8)
2024–2025	Van	28	(7)
2025–	Alashkert	25	(14)

International career^{‡}
2018	Armenia U17	5	(0)
2022–2024	Armenia U21	10	(0)
2025–	Armenia	3	(0)
- * Club domestic league appearances and goals as of 18 June 2026 ‡ National team caps and goals as of 2 October 2026 (UTC)

Karen Nalbandyan (Armenian: Կարեն Նալբանդյան; born 14 April 2002) is an Armenian professional footballer who plays as a attacking midfielder for Armenian Premier League club Alashkert and the Armenia national team.

== Club ==
On 25 June 2022, Noah signed a contract with Nalbandyan. On 4 January 2023, his contract was terminated by mutual agreement.

On 24 January 2023, Nalbandyan moved to Alashkert.

On 29 June 2025, Nalbandyan joined to Alashkert again, along with a group of other Van players.

== International ==
On 27 August 2025, Nalbandyan received his first call-up to the Armenian senior national team for a 2026 FIFA World Cup qualification matches against Portugal and Republic of Ireland respectively.

On 13 November 2025, he made his debut for Armenia in a home 2026 FIFA World Cup qualification match against Hungary, coming on as a substitute.

== Career statistics ==
=== International ===
As of match played 2 October 2026

Appearances and goals by national team and year
National team	Year	Apps	Goals
Armenia	2025	1	0
Armenia	2026	2	0
Total		3	0

== Honours ==
=== Club ===
Noravank

- Armenian Cup: 2021–22
